= 2019 Presidential Tour of Turkey =

Cycling race

2019 UCI World Tour, race 17 of 38

Race details
- Dates: 16–21 April 2019
- Stages: 6
- Distance: 993.4 km (617.3 mi)
- Winning time: 24h 53' 58"

Results
Jersey awarded to the overall winner	Winner	Felix Großschartner (AUT)	(Bora–Hansgrohe)
	Second	Valerio Conti (ITA)	(UAE Team Emirates)
	Third	Merhawi Kudus (ERI)	(Astana)
Jersey awarded to the mountains classification winner	Mountains	Thimo Willems (BEL)	(Sport Vlaanderen–Baloise)
Jersey awarded to the youth classification winner	Youth	Feritcan Şamlı (TUR)	(Salcano–Sakarya BB Team)
Jersey awarded to the sprints classification winner	Sprints	Sam Bennett (IRL)	(Bora–Hansgrohe)
	Team	Team Manzana Postobón	

The 2019 Presidential Tour of Turkey was a road cycling stage race, that took place between 16 and 21 April 2019 in Turkey. It was the 55th edition of the Presidential Tour of Turkey and the 17th race of the 2019 UCI World Tour.

== Teams ==
Seventeen teams started the race. Each team had a maximum of seven riders:

UCI WorldTeams

- Astana
- Bora–Hansgrohe
- Deceuninck–Quick-Step
- Lotto–Soudal
- Team Dimension Data
- UAE Team Emirates

UCI Professional Continental teams

- Burgos BH
- Caja Rural–Seguros RGA
- Delko–Marseille Provence
- Euskadi–Murias
- Team Manzana Postobón
- Neri Sottoli–Selle Italia–KTM
- Nippo–Vini Fantini–Faizanè
- Rally UHC Cycling
- Sport Vlaanderen–Baloise
- W52 / FC Porto

National teams

- Turkey

== Route ==
Stage characteristics and winners
Stage	Date	Course	Distance	Type	Stage winner
1	16 April	Istanbul to Tekirdağ	156.7 km (97.4 mi)	Flat stage	Sam Bennett (IRL)
2	17 April	Tekirdağ to Eceabat	183.3 km (113.9 mi)	Flat stage	Sam Bennett (IRL)
3	18 April	Çanakkale to Edremit	122.6 km (76.2 mi)	Flat stage	Fabio Jakobsen (NED)
4	19 April	Balıkesir to Bursa	194.3 km (120.7 mi)	Flat stage	Caleb Ewan (AUS)
5	20 April	Bursa to Kartepe	164.1 km (102.0 mi)	Mountain stage	Felix Großschartner (AUT)
6	21 April	Sakarya to Istanbul	172.4 km (107.1 mi)	Flat stage	Caleb Ewan (AUS)

== Stages ==
=== Stage 1 ===
16 April 2019 — Istanbul to Tekirdağ, 156.7 km (97 mi)

Result of Stage 1
Rank	Rider	Team	Time
1	Sam Bennett (IRL)	Bora–Hansgrohe	3h 32' 34"
2	Fabio Jakobsen (NED)	Deceuninck–Quick-Step	+ 0"
3	Caleb Ewan (AUS)	Lotto–Soudal	+ 0"
4	Eduard-Michael Grosu (ROM)	Delko–Marseille Provence	+ 0"
5	Simone Consonni (ITA)	UAE Team Emirates	+ 0"
6	Luca Pacioni (ITA)	Neri Sottoli–Selle Italia–KTM	+ 0"
7	Imerio Cima (ITA)	Nippo–Vini Fantini–Faizanè	+ 0"
8	Christophe Noppe (BEL)	Sport Vlaanderen–Baloise	+ 0"
9	Giovanni Lonardi (ITA)	Nippo–Vini Fantini–Faizanè	+ 0"
10	Álvaro Hodeg (COL)	Deceuninck–Quick-Step	+ 0"

General classification after Stage 1
Rank	Rider	Team	Time
1	Sam Bennett (IRL)	Bora–Hansgrohe	3h 32' 34"
2	Fabio Jakobsen (NED)	Deceuninck–Quick-Step	+ 4"
3	Caleb Ewan (AUS)	Lotto–Soudal	+ 6"
4	Lorenzo Fortunato (ITA)	Neri Sottoli–Selle Italia–KTM	+ 7"
5	Álvaro Robredo (ESP)	Burgos BH	+ 8"
6	Lindsay De Vylder (BEL)	Sport Vlaanderen–Baloise	+ 9"
7	Eduard-Michael Grosu (ROM)	Delko–Marseille Provence	+ 10"
8	Simone Consonni (ITA)	UAE Team Emirates	+ 10"
9	Luca Pacioni (ITA)	Neri Sottoli–Selle Italia–KTM	+ 10"
10	Imerio Cima (ITA)	Nippo–Vini Fantini–Faizanè	+ 10"

=== Stage 2 ===
17 April 2019 — Tekirdağ to Eceabat, 183.3 km (114 mi)

Result of Stage 2
Rank	Rider	Team	Time
1	Sam Bennett (IRL)	Bora–Hansgrohe	4h 41' 48"
2	Felix Großschartner (AUT)	Bora–Hansgrohe	+ 0"
3	Jhonatan Restrepo (COL)	Team Manzana Postobón	+ 0"
4	Gonzalo Serrano (ESP)	Caja Rural–Seguros RGA	+ 0"
5	Jan Polanc (SLO)	UAE Team Emirates	+ 0"
6	Mauro Finetto (ITA)	Delko–Marseille Provence	+ 0"
7	Valerio Conti (ITA)	UAE Team Emirates	+ 0"
8	Edgar Pinto (POR)	W52 / FC Porto	+ 3"
9	Sebastian Schönberger (AUT)	Neri Sottoli–Selle Italia–KTM	+ 4"
10	Cyril Barthe (FRA)	Euskadi–Murias	+ 4"

General classification after Stage 2
Rank	Rider	Team	Time
1	Sam Bennett (IRL)	Bora–Hansgrohe	8h 14' 02"
2	Felix Großschartner (AUT)	Bora–Hansgrohe	+ 14"
3	Jhonatan Restrepo (COL)	Team Manzana Postobón	+ 16"
4	Jan Polanc (SLO)	UAE Team Emirates	+ 20"
5	Valerio Conti (ITA)	UAE Team Emirates	+ 20"
6	Mauro Finetto (ITA)	Delko–Marseille Provence	+ 20"
7	Gonzalo Serrano (ESP)	Caja Rural–Seguros RGA	+ 20"
8	Edgar Pinto (POR)	W52 / FC Porto	+ 23"
9	Christophe Noppe (BEL)	Sport Vlaanderen–Baloise	+ 24"
10	Cyril Barthe (FRA)	Euskadi–Murias	+ 24"

=== Stage 3 ===
18 April 2019 — Çanakkale to Edremit, 122.6 km (76 mi)

Result of Stage 3
Rank	Rider	Team	Time
1	Fabio Jakobsen (NED)	Deceuninck–Quick-Step	2h 50' 12"
2	Sam Bennett (IRL)	Bora–Hansgrohe	+ 0"
3	Mark Cavendish (GBR)	Team Dimension Data	+ 0"
4	Caleb Ewan (AUS)	Lotto–Soudal	+ 0"
5	Christophe Noppe (BEL)	Sport Vlaanderen–Baloise	+ 0"
6	Matteo Malucelli (ITA)	Caja Rural–Seguros RGA	+ 0"
7	Matthew Gibson (GBR)	Burgos BH	+ 0"
8	Luca Pacioni (ITA)	Neri Sottoli–Selle Italia–KTM	+ 0"
9	Jordan Parra (COL)	Team Manzana Postobón	+ 0"
10	Yevgeniy Gidich (KAZ)	Astana	+ 0"

General classification after Stage 3
Rank	Rider	Team	Time
1	Sam Bennett (IRL)	Bora–Hansgrohe	11h 04' 08"
2	Felix Großschartner (AUT)	Bora–Hansgrohe	+ 20"
3	Jhonatan Restrepo (COL)	Team Manzana Postobón	+ 22"
4	Jan Polanc (SLO)	UAE Team Emirates	+ 26"
5	Gonzalo Serrano (ESP)	Caja Rural–Seguros RGA	+ 26"
6	Valerio Conti (ITA)	UAE Team Emirates	+ 26"
7	Mauro Finetto (ITA)	Delko–Marseille Provence	+ 26"
8	Edgar Pinto (POR)	W52 / FC Porto	+ 29"
9	Christophe Noppe (BEL)	Sport Vlaanderen–Baloise	+ 30"
10	Merhawi Kudus (ERI)	Astana	+ 30"

=== Stage 4 ===
19 April 2019 — Balıkesir to Bursa, 194.3 km (121 mi)

Result of Stage 4
Rank	Rider	Team	Time
1	Caleb Ewan (AUS)	Lotto–Soudal	5h 21' 38"
2	Juan José Lobato (ESP)	Nippo–Vini Fantini–Faizanè	+ 0"
3	Sam Bennett (IRL)	Bora–Hansgrohe	+ 0"
4	Simone Consonni (ITA)	UAE Team Emirates	+ 0"
5	Fabio Jakobsen (NED)	Deceuninck–Quick-Step	+ 0"
6	Juan Sebastián Molano (COL)	UAE Team Emirates	+ 0"
7	Jon Aberasturi (ESP)	Caja Rural–Seguros RGA	+ 0"
8	Enrique Sanz (ESP)	Euskadi–Murias	+ 0"
9	Giovanni Lonardi (ITA)	Nippo–Vini Fantini–Faizanè	+ 0"
10	Gonzalo Serrano (ESP)	Caja Rural–Seguros RGA	+ 0"

General classification after Stage 4
Rank	Rider	Team	Time
1	Sam Bennett (IRL)	Bora–Hansgrohe	16h 25' 42"
2	Felix Großschartner (AUT)	Bora–Hansgrohe	+ 24"
3	Jhonatan Restrepo (COL)	Team Manzana Postobón	+ 26"
4	Jan Polanc (SLO)	UAE Team Emirates	+ 30"
5	Gonzalo Serrano (ESP)	Caja Rural–Seguros RGA	+ 30"
6	Valerio Conti (ITA)	UAE Team Emirates	+ 30"
7	Mauro Finetto (ITA)	Delko–Marseille Provence	+ 30"
8	Edgar Pinto (POR)	W52 / FC Porto	+ 33"
9	Christophe Noppe (BEL)	Sport Vlaanderen–Baloise	+ 34"
10	Sebastian Schönberger (AUT)	Neri Sottoli–Selle Italia–KTM	+ 34"

=== Stage 5 ===
20 April 2019 — Bursa to Kartepe, 164.1 km (102 mi)

Result of Stage 5
Rank	Rider	Team	Time
1	Felix Großschartner (AUT)	Bora–Hansgrohe	4h 17' 13"
2	Valerio Conti (ITA)	UAE Team Emirates	+ 9"
3	Merhawi Kudus (ERI)	Astana	+ 9"
4	Remco Evenepoel (BEL)	Deceuninck–Quick-Step	+ 16"
5	Edgar Pinto (POR)	W52 / FC Porto	+ 40"
6	Jan Polanc (SLO)	UAE Team Emirates	+ 51"
7	Kyle Murphy (USA)	Rally UHC Cycling	+ 58"
8	Mauro Finetto (ITA)	Delko–Marseille Provence	+ 1' 03"
9	Etienne van Empel (NED)	Neri Sottoli–Selle Italia–KTM	+ 1' 08"
10	Rob Britton (CAN)	Rally UHC Cycling	+ 1' 08"

General classification after Stage 5
Rank	Rider	Team	Time
1	Felix Großschartner (AUT)	Bora–Hansgrohe	20h 43' 09"
2	Valerio Conti (ITA)	UAE Team Emirates	+ 19"
3	Merhawi Kudus (ERI)	Astana	+ 25"
4	Remco Evenepoel (BEL)	Deceuninck–Quick-Step	+ 41"
5	Edgar Pinto (POR)	W52 / FC Porto	+ 59"
6	Jan Polanc (SLO)	UAE Team Emirates	+ 1' 07"
7	Mauro Finetto (ITA)	Delko–Marseille Provence	+ 1' 19"
8	Jhonatan Restrepo (COL)	Team Manzana Postobón	+ 1' 26"
9	Gonzalo Serrano (ESP)	Caja Rural–Seguros RGA	+ 1' 29"
10	Kyle Murphy (USA)	Rally UHC Cycling	+ 1' 30"

=== Stage 6 ===
21 April 2019 — Sakarya to Istanbul, 172.4 km (107 mi)

Result of Stage 6
Rank	Rider	Team	Time
1	Caleb Ewan (AUS)	Lotto–Soudal	4h 10' 41"
2	Fabio Jakobsen (NED)	Deceuninck–Quick-Step	+ 1"
3	Sam Bennett (IRL)	Bora–Hansgrohe	+ 4"
4	Simone Consonni (ITA)	UAE Team Emirates	+ 4"
5	Jon Aberasturi (ESP)	Caja Rural–Seguros RGA	+ 7"
6	Enrique Sanz (ESP)	Euskadi–Murias	+ 7"
7	Christophe Noppe (BEL)	Sport Vlaanderen–Baloise	+ 7"
8	Felix Großschartner (AUT)	Bora–Hansgrohe	+ 7"
9	Imerio Cima (ITA)	Nippo–Vini Fantini–Faizanè	+ 7"
10	Eduard-Michael Grosu (ROU)	Delko–Marseille Provence	+ 7"

== Classification leadership table ==
Stage	Winner	General classification	Points classification	Mountains classification	Turkish Beauties classification	Team classification
1	Sam Bennett	Sam Bennett	Sam Bennett	Lindsay De Vylder	Feritcan Şamlı	Caja Rural–Seguros RGA
2	Sam Bennett	Sam Bennett	Sam Bennett	Thimo Willems	Feritcan Şamlı	Bora–Hansgrohe
3	Fabio Jakobsen	Sam Bennett	Sam Bennett	Thimo Willems	Feritcan Şamlı	Bora–Hansgrohe
4	Caleb Ewan	Sam Bennett	Sam Bennett	Thimo Willems	Feritcan Şamlı	Bora–Hansgrohe
5	Felix Großschartner	Felix Großschartner	Sam Bennett	Felix Großschartner	Feritcan Şamlı	Team Manzana Postobón
6	Caleb Ewan	Felix Großschartner	Sam Bennett	Thimo Willems	Feritcan Şamlı	Team Manzana Postobón
Final		Felix Großschartner	Sam Bennett	Thimo Willems	Feritcan Şamlı	Team Manzana Postobón

== Final classification standings ==
Legend
Denotes the leader of the general classification
Denotes the leader of the points classification
Denotes the leader of the mountains classification

=== General classification ===
Final general classification (1-10)
Rank	Rider	Team	Time
1	Felix Großschartner (AUT)	Bora–Hansgrohe	24h 53' 58"
2	Valerio Conti (ITA)	UAE Team Emirates	+ 19"
3	Merhawi Kudus (ERI)	Astana	+ 25"
4	Remco Evenepoel (BEL)	Deceuninck–Quick-Step	+ 53"
5	Edgar Pinto (POR)	W52 / FC Porto	+ 59"
6	Jan Polanc (SLO)	UAE Team Emirates	+ 1' 12"
7	Gonzalo Serrano (ESP)	Caja Rural–Seguros RGA	+ 1' 29"
8	Mauro Finetto (ITA)	Delko–Marseille Provence	+ 1' 31"
9	Kyle Murphy (USA)	Rally UHC Cycling	+ 1' 42"
10	Etienne van Empel (NED)	Neri Sottoli–Selle Italia–KTM	+ 1' 48"

=== Points classification ===
Final points classification (1-10)
Rank	Rider	Team	Points
1	Sam Bennett (IRL)	Bora–Hansgrohe	70
2	Caleb Ewan (AUS)	Lotto–Soudal	55
3	Fabio Jakobsen (NED)	Deceuninck–Quick-Step	54
4	Felix Großschartner (AUT)	Bora–Hansgrohe	40
5	Simone Consonni (ITA)	UAE Team Emirates	40
6	Christophe Noppe (BEL)	Sport Vlaanderen–Baloise	32
7	Valerio Conti (ITA)	UAE Team Emirates	27
8	Gonzalo Serrano (ESP)	Caja Rural–Seguros RGA	24
9	Jan Polanc (SLO)	UAE Team Emirates	22
10	Enrique Sanz (ESP)	Euskadi–Murias	22

=== Mountains classification ===
Final mountains classification (1-10)
Rank	Rider	Team	Points
1	Thimo Willems (BEL)	Sport Vlaanderen–Baloise	16
2	Felix Großschartner (AUT)	Bora–Hansgrohe	15
3	Valerio Conti (ITA)	UAE Team Emirates	13
4	Merhawi Kudus (ERI)	Astana	8
5	Lindsay De Vylder (BEL)	Sport Vlaanderen–Baloise	5
6	Remco Evenepoel (BEL)	Deceuninck–Quick-Step	5
7	Lucas De Rossi (FRA)	Delko–Marseille Provence	5
8	Mauricio Moreira (URU)	Caja Rural–Seguros RGA	4
9	Umberto Marengo (ITA)	Neri Sottoli–Selle Italia–KTM	3
10	Ramūnas Navardauskas (LTU)	Delko–Marseille Provence	3

=== Teams classification ===
Final teams classification (1-10)
Rank	Team	Time
1	Team Manzana Postobón	74h 47' 35"
2	Delko–Marseille Provence	+ 1' 21"
3	Astana	+ 1' 25"
4	Neri Sottoli–Selle Italia–KTM	+ 2' 07"
5	W52 / FC Porto	+ 2' 54"
6	Rally UHC Cycling	+ 5' 52"
7	Team Dimension Data	+ 7' 27"
8	Bora–Hansgrohe	+ 8' 30"
9	Deceuninck–Quick-Step	+ 8' 35"
10	Nippo–Vini Fantini–Faizanè	+ 10' 49"
