= 2021 Benelux Tour =

2021 UCI World Tour, race 26 of 29

Race details
- Dates: 30 August – 5 September 2021
- Stages: 7
- Distance: 1,091.6 km (678.3 mi)
- Winning time: 24h 14' 29"

Results
Jersey awarded to the overall winner	Winner	Sonny Colbrelli (ITA)	(Team Bahrain Victorious)
	Second	Matej Mohorič (SLO)	(Team Bahrain Victorious)
	Third	Victor Campenaerts (BEL)	(Team Qhubeka NextHash)
Jersey awarded to the points classification winner	Points	Danny van Poppel (NED)	(Intermarché–Wanty–Gobert Matériaux)
Jersey awarded to the combativity classification winner	Combativity	Arjen Livyns (BEL)	(Bingoal Pauwels Sauces WB)
	Team	Team Bahrain Victorious	

The 2021 Benelux Tour is a road cycling stage race that took place from 30 August to 5 September 2021 in Belgium and the Netherlands. It was the first edition of the newly rebranded Benelux Tour and the 17th edition overall. The race was the 26th event on the 2021 UCI World Tour calendar.

== Teams ==
All nineteen UCI WorldTeams and three UCI ProTeams made up the twenty-two teams that participated in the race.AG2R Citroën Team and Team BikeExchange, with six riders each, were the only teams to not field a full squad of seven riders; Astana–Premier Tech was also reduced to six riders after a late non-starter. Of the 151 riders who started the race, 93 finished.

UCI WorldTeams

- AG2R Citroën Team
- Astana–Premier Tech
- Bora–Hansgrohe
- Cofidis
- Deceuninck–Quick-Step
- EF Education–Nippo
- Groupama–FDJ
- Ineos Grenadiers
- Intermarché–Wanty–Gobert Matériaux
- Israel Start-Up Nation
- Lotto–Soudal
- Movistar Team
- Team Bahrain Victorious
- Team BikeExchange
- Team DSM
- Team Jumbo–Visma
- Team Qhubeka NextHash
- Trek–Segafredo
- UAE Team Emirates

UCI ProTeams

- Alpecin–Fenix
- Bingoal Pauwels Sauces WB
- Sport Vlaanderen–Baloise

== Route ==
Stage characteristics and winners
Stage	Date	Course	Distance	Type	Stage winner
1	30 August	(Netherlands) Surhuisterveen to (Netherlands) Dokkum	169.6 km (105.4 mi)	Flat stage	Tim Merlier (BEL)
2	31 August	(Netherlands) Lelystad to (Netherlands) Lelystad	11.1 km (6.9 mi)	Individual time trial	Stefan Bissegger (SUI)
3	1 September	(Belgium) Essen to (Netherlands) Hoogerheide	168.3 km (104.6 mi)	Flat stage	Taco van der Hoorn (NED)
4	2 September	(Belgium) Aalter to (Belgium) Ardooie	166.1 km (103.2 mi)	Flat stage	Tim Merlier (BEL)
5	3 September	(Belgium) Riemst to (Belgium) Bilzen	188.0 km (116.8 mi)	Hilly stage	Caleb Ewan (AUS)
6	4 September	(Belgium) Ottignies-Louvain-la-Neuve to (Belgium) Houffalize	207.6 km (129.0 mi)	Hilly stage	Sonny Colbrelli (ITA)
7	5 September	(Belgium) Namur to (Belgium) Geraardsbergen	180.9 km (112.4 mi)	Hilly stage	Matej Mohorič (SLO)
Total			1,091.6 km (678.3 mi)		

== Stages ==
=== Stage 1 ===
30 August 2021 – Surhuisterveen to Dokkum, 169.6 km (105.4 mi)

Stage 1 Result
Rank	Rider	Team	Time
1	Tim Merlier (BEL)	Alpecin–Fenix	3h 32' 20"
2	Phil Bauhaus (GER)	Team Bahrain Victorious	+ 0"
3	Álvaro Hodeg (COL)	Deceuninck–Quick-Step	+ 0"
4	Fernando Gaviria (COL)	UAE Team Emirates	+ 0"
5	Danny van Poppel (NED)	Intermarché–Wanty–Gobert Matériaux	+ 0"
6	Mads Pedersen (DEN)	Trek–Segafredo	+ 0"
7	Max Walscheid (GER)	Team Qhubeka NextHash	+ 0"
8	Stanisław Aniołkowski (POL)	Bingoal Pauwels Sauces WB	+ 0"
9	Mike Teunissen (NED)	Team Jumbo–Visma	+ 0"
10	Christophe Laporte (FRA)	Cofidis	+ 0"

General classification after Stage 1
Rank	Rider	Team	Time
1	Tim Merlier (BEL)	Alpecin–Fenix	3h 32' 10"
2	Phil Bauhaus (GER)	Team Bahrain Victorious	+ 4"
3	Álvaro Hodeg (COL)	Deceuninck–Quick-Step	+ 6"
4	Mike Teunissen (NED)	Team Jumbo–Visma	+ 6"
5	Matej Mohorič (SLO)	Team Bahrain Victorious	+ 6"
6	Tiesj Benoot (BEL)	Team DSM	+ 7"
7	Lukas Pöstlberger (AUT)	Bora–Hansgrohe	+ 7"
8	Sonny Colbrelli (ITA)	Team Bahrain Victorious	+ 8"
9	Kasper Asgreen (DEN)	Deceuninck–Quick-Step	+ 8"
10	Fernando Gaviria (COL)	UAE Team Emirates	+ 10"

=== Stage 2 ===
31 August 2021 – Lelystad to Lelystad, 11.1 km (6.9 mi) (ITT)

Stage 2 Result
Rank	Rider	Team	Time
1	Stefan Bissegger (SUI)	EF Education–Nippo	12' 08"
2	Edoardo Affini (ITA)	Team Jumbo–Visma	+ 15"
3	Stefan Küng (SUI)	Groupama–FDJ	+ 20"
4	Kasper Asgreen (DEN)	Deceuninck–Quick-Step	+ 21"
5	Max Walscheid (GER)	Team Qhubeka NextHash	+ 22"
6	Tom Dumoulin (NED)	Team Jumbo–Visma	+ 23"
7	Søren Kragh Andersen (DEN)	Team DSM	+ 24"
8	Victor Campenaerts (BEL)	Team Qhubeka NextHash	+ 26"
9	Christophe Laporte (FRA)	Cofidis	+ 29"
10	Brandon McNulty (USA)	UAE Team Emirates	+ 31"

General classification after Stage 2
Rank	Rider	Team	Time
1	Stefan Bissegger (SUI)	EF Education–Nippo	3h 44' 28"
2	Kasper Asgreen (DEN)	Deceuninck–Quick-Step	+ 19"
3	Stefan Küng (SUI)	Groupama–FDJ	+ 20"
4	Max Walscheid (GER)	Team Qhubeka NextHash	+ 22"
5	Victor Campenaerts (BEL)	Team Qhubeka NextHash	+ 26"
6	Christophe Laporte (FRA)	Cofidis	+ 29"
7	Matej Mohorič (SLO)	Team Bahrain Victorious	+ 36"
8	Luke Durbridge (AUS)	Team BikeExchange	+ 39"
9	Sonny Colbrelli (ITA)	Team Bahrain Victorious	+ 42"
10	Tim Wellens (BEL)	Lotto–Soudal	+ 46"

=== Stage 3 ===
1 September 2021 – Essen to Hoogerheide, 168.3 km (104.6 mi)

Stage 3 Result
Rank	Rider	Team	Time
1	Taco van der Hoorn (NED)	Intermarché–Wanty–Gobert Matériaux	3h 40' 23"
2	Mathias Norsgaard (DEN)	Movistar Team	+ 0"
3	Luke Durbridge (AUS)	Team BikeExchange	+ 0"
4	Samuele Battistella (ITA)	Astana–Premier Tech	+ 0"
5	Thimo Willems (BEL)	Sport Vlaanderen–Baloise	+ 0"
6	Peter Sagan (SVK)	Bora–Hansgrohe	+ 4"
7	Phil Bauhaus (GER)	Team Bahrain Victorious	+ 4"
8	Danny van Poppel (NED)	Intermarché–Wanty–Gobert Matériaux	+ 4"
9	Caleb Ewan (AUS)	Lotto–Soudal	+ 4"
10	Mads Pedersen (DEN)	Trek–Segafredo	+ 4"

General classification after Stage 3
Rank	Rider	Team	Time
1	Stefan Bissegger (SUI)	EF Education–Nippo	7h 24' 55"
2	Kasper Asgreen (DEN)	Deceuninck–Quick-Step	+ 19"
3	Stefan Küng (SUI)	Groupama–FDJ	+ 20"
4	Luke Durbridge (AUS)	Team BikeExchange	+ 22"
5	Max Walscheid (GER)	Team Qhubeka NextHash	+ 22"
6	Victor Campenaerts (BEL)	Team Qhubeka NextHash	+ 26"
7	Christophe Laporte (FRA)	Cofidis	+ 29"
8	Matej Mohorič (SLO)	Team Bahrain Victorious	+ 36"
9	Sonny Colbrelli (ITA)	Team Bahrain Victorious	+ 42"
10	Tim Wellens (BEL)	Lotto–Soudal	+ 46"

=== Stage 4 ===
2 September 2021 – Aalter to Ardooie, 166.1 km (103.2 mi)

Stage 4 Result
Rank	Rider	Team	Time
1	Tim Merlier (BEL)	Alpecin–Fenix	3h 36' 29"
2	Mads Pedersen (DEN)	Trek–Segafredo	+ 0"
3	Danny van Poppel (NED)	Intermarché–Wanty–Gobert Matériaux	+ 0"
4	Peter Sagan (SVK)	Bora–Hansgrohe	+ 0"
5	Christophe Laporte (FRA)	Cofidis	+ 0"
6	Phil Bauhaus (GER)	Team Bahrain Victorious	+ 0"
7	Fernando Gaviria (COL)	UAE Team Emirates	+ 0"
8	Max Walscheid (GER)	Team Qhubeka NextHash	+ 0"
9	Dylan Groenewegen (NED)	Team Jumbo–Visma	+ 0"
10	Fabian Lienhard (SUI)	Groupama–FDJ	+ 0"

General classification after Stage 4
Rank	Rider	Team	Time
1	Stefan Bissegger (SUI)	EF Education–Nippo	11h 01' 24"
2	Kasper Asgreen (DEN)	Deceuninck–Quick-Step	+ 13"
3	Luke Durbridge (AUS)	Team BikeExchange	+ 20"
4	Stefan Küng (SUI)	Groupama–FDJ	+ 20"
5	Max Walscheid (GER)	Team Qhubeka NextHash	+ 22"
6	Christophe Laporte (FRA)	Cofidis	+ 26"
7	Victor Campenaerts (BEL)	Team Qhubeka NextHash	+ 26"
8	Matej Mohorič (SLO)	Team Bahrain Victorious	+ 36"
9	Tim Merlier (BEL)	Alpecin–Fenix	+ 40"
10	Sonny Colbrelli (ITA)	Team Bahrain Victorious	+ 40"

=== Stage 5 ===
3 September 2021 – Riemst to Bilzen, 188.0 km (116.8 mi)

Stage 5 Result
Rank	Rider	Team	Time
1	Caleb Ewan (AUS)	Lotto–Soudal	4h 26' 24"
2	Sonny Colbrelli (ITA)	Team Bahrain Victorious	+ 0"
3	Danny van Poppel (NED)	Intermarché–Wanty–Gobert Matériaux	+ 0"
4	Peter Sagan (SVK)	Bora–Hansgrohe	+ 0"
5	Jasper Stuyven (BEL)	Trek–Segafredo	+ 0"
6	Tim Merlier (BEL)	Alpecin–Fenix	+ 0"
7	Mike Teunissen (NED)	Team Jumbo–Visma	+ 0"
8	Matej Mohorič (SLO)	Team Bahrain Victorious	+ 0"
9	Christophe Laporte (FRA)	Cofidis	+ 0"
10	Oliver Naesen (BEL)	Groupama–FDJ	+ 0"

General classification after Stage 5
Rank	Rider	Team	Time
1	Stefan Küng (SUI)	Groupama–FDJ	15h 28' 08"
2	Luke Durbridge (AUS)	Team BikeExchange	+ 2"
3	Christophe Laporte (FRA)	Cofidis	+ 6"
4	Victor Campenaerts (BEL)	Team Qhubeka NextHash	+ 6"
5	Sonny Colbrelli (ITA)	Team Bahrain Victorious	+ 14"
6	Matej Mohorič (SLO)	Team Bahrain Victorious	+ 16"
7	Tim Merlier (BEL)	Alpecin–Fenix	+ 20"
8	Tim Wellens (BEL)	Lotto–Soudal	+ 25"
9	Tiesj Benoot (BEL)	Team DSM	+ 26"
10	Lukas Pöstlberger (AUT)	Bora–Hansgrohe	+ 28"

=== Stage 6 ===
4 September 2021 – Ottignies-Louvain-la-Neuve to Houffalize, 207.6 km (129.0 mi)

Stage 6 Result
Rank	Rider	Team	Time
1	Sonny Colbrelli (ITA)	Team Bahrain Victorious	4h 55' 27"
2	Matej Mohorič (SLO)	Team Bahrain Victorious	+ 42"
3	Jasper Stuyven (BEL)	Trek–Segafredo	+ 42"
4	Tiesj Benoot (BEL)	Team DSM	+ 42"
5	Victor Campenaerts (BEL)	Team Qhubeka NextHash	+ 42"
6	Tim Wellens (BEL)	Lotto–Soudal	+ 42"
7	Marc Hirschi (SUI)	UAE Team Emirates	+ 42"
8	Tom Dumoulin (NED)	Team Jumbo–Visma	+ 42"
9	Nikias Arndt (GER)	Team DSM	+ 1' 02"
10	Gianni Vermeersch (BEL)	Alpecin–Fenix	+ 1' 02"

General classification after Stage 6
Rank	Rider	Team	Time
1	Sonny Colbrelli (ITA)	Team Bahrain Victorious	20h 23' 30"
2	Matej Mohorič (SLO)	Team Bahrain Victorious	+ 51"
3	Victor Campenaerts (BEL)	Team Qhubeka NextHash	+ 53"
4	Stefan Küng (SUI)	Groupama–FDJ	+ 1' 07"
5	Luke Durbridge (AUS)	Team BikeExchange	+ 1' 09"
6	Tim Wellens (BEL)	Lotto–Soudal	+ 1' 09"
7	Jasper Stuyven (BEL)	Trek–Segafredo	+ 1' 16"
8	Tiesj Benoot (BEL)	Team DSM	+ 1' 33"
9	Mike Teunissen (NED)	Team Jumbo–Visma	+ 1' 40"
10	Kasper Asgreen (DEN)	Deceuninck–Quick-Step	+ 1' 42"

=== Stage 7 ===
5 September 2021 – Namur to Geraardsbergen, 180.9 km (112.4 mi)

Stage 7 Result
Rank	Rider	Team	Time
1	Matej Mohorič (SLO)	Team Bahrain Victorious	3h 50' 56"
2	Sonny Colbrelli (ITA)	Team Bahrain Victorious	+ 11"
3	Tom Dumoulin (NED)	Team Jumbo–Visma	+ 15"
4	Christophe Laporte (FRA)	Cofidis	+ 22"
5	Fred Wright (GBR)	Team Bahrain Victorious	+ 22"
6	Danny van Poppel (NED)	Intermarché–Wanty–Gobert Matériaux	+ 24"
7	Tom Van Asbroeck (BEL)	Israel Start-Up Nation	+ 24"
8	Greg Van Avermaet (BEL)	AG2R Citroën Team	+ 24"
9	Tiesj Benoot (BEL)	Team DSM	+ 24"
10	Peter Sagan (SVK)	Bora–Hansgrohe	+ 24"

General classification after Stage 7
Rank	Rider	Team	Time
1	Sonny Colbrelli (ITA)	Team Bahrain Victorious	24h 14' 29"
2	Matej Mohorič (SLO)	Team Bahrain Victorious	+ 29"
3	Victor Campenaerts (BEL)	Team Qhubeka NextHash	+ 1' 14"
4	Tim Wellens (BEL)	Lotto–Soudal	+ 1' 26"
5	Stefan Küng (SUI)	Groupama–FDJ	+ 1' 28"
6	Luke Durbridge (AUS)	Team BikeExchange	+ 1' 30"
7	Jasper Stuyven (BEL)	Trek–Segafredo	+ 1' 37"
8	Tiesj Benoot (BEL)	Team DSM	+ 1' 54"
9	Tom Dumoulin (NED)	Team Jumbo–Visma	+ 1' 55"
10	Mike Teunissen (NED)	Team Jumbo–Visma	+ 2' 01"

== Classification leadership table ==
Classification leadership by stage
Stage	Winner	General classification	Points classification	Combativity classification	Team classification
1	Tim Merlier	Tim Merlier	Tim Merlier	Arjen Livyns	Team Bahrain Victorious
2	Stefan Bissegger	Stefan Bissegger	Stefan Bissegger	Arjen Livyns	Team Qhubeka NextHash
3	Taco van der Hoorn	Stefan Bissegger	Phil Bauhaus	Luke Durbridge	Team Qhubeka NextHash
4	Tim Merlier	Stefan Bissegger	Tim Merlier	Arjen Livyns	Team Qhubeka NextHash
5	Caleb Ewan	Stefan Küng	Tim Merlier	Arjen Livyns	Team Qhubeka NextHash
6	Sonny Colbrelli	Sonny Colbrelli	Tim Merlier	Arjen Livyns	Team Bahrain Victorious
7	Matej Mohorič	Sonny Colbrelli	Danny van Poppel	Arjen Livyns	Team Bahrain Victorious
Final		Sonny Colbrelli	Danny van Poppel	Arjen Livyns	Team Bahrain Victorious

- On stage 2, Phil Bauhaus, who was second in the points classification, wore the teal jersey, because first-placed Tim Merlier wore the blue jersey as the leader of the general classification. For the same reason, Tim Merlier wore the teal jersey on stage 3 with Stefan Bissegger as the leader of the general classification.

== Final classification standings ==
Legend
Denotes the winner of the general classification
Denotes the winner of the points classification
Denotes the winner of the combativity classification

=== General classification ===
Final general classification (1–10)
Rank	Rider	Team	Time
1	Sonny Colbrelli (ITA)	Team Bahrain Victorious	24h 14' 29"
2	Matej Mohorič (SLO)	Team Bahrain Victorious	+ 29"
3	Victor Campenaerts (BEL)	Team Qhubeka NextHash	+ 1' 14"
4	Tim Wellens (BEL)	Lotto–Soudal	+ 1' 26"
5	Stefan Küng (SUI)	Groupama–FDJ	+ 1' 28"
6	Luke Durbridge (AUS)	Team BikeExchange	+ 1' 30"
7	Jasper Stuyven (BEL)	Trek–Segafredo	+ 1' 37"
8	Tiesj Benoot (BEL)	Team DSM	+ 1' 54"
9	Tom Dumoulin (NED)	Team Jumbo–Visma	+ 1' 55"
10	Mike Teunissen (NED)	Team Jumbo–Visma	+ 2' 01"

=== Points classification ===
Final points classification (1–10)
Rank	Rider	Team	Points
1	Danny van Poppel (NED)	Intermarché–Wanty–Gobert Matériaux	88
2	Sonny Colbrelli (ITA)	Team Bahrain Victorious	80
3	Tim Merlier (BEL)	Alpecin–Fenix	75
4	Christophe Laporte (FRA)	Cofidis	68
5	Matej Mohorič (SLO)	Team Bahrain Victorious	67
6	Peter Sagan (SVK)	Bora–Hansgrohe	63
7	Phil Bauhaus (GER)	Team Bahrain Victorious	53
8	Tom Dumoulin (NED)	Team Jumbo–Visma	49
9	Jasper Stuyven (BEL)	Trek–Segafredo	39
10	Stefan Bissegger (SUI)	EF Education–Nippo	30

=== Combativity classification ===
Final combativity classification (1–10)
Rank	Rider	Team	Points
1	Arjen Livyns (BEL)	Bingoal Pauwels Sauces WB	56
2	Luke Durbridge (AUS)	Team BikeExchange	35
3	Thomas Sprengers (BEL)	Sport Vlaanderen–Baloise	27
4	Matej Mohorič (SLO)	Team Bahrain Victorious	20
5	Jack Bauer (NZL)	Team BikeExchange	20
6	Hugo Houle (CAN)	Astana–Premier Tech	20
7	Kasper Asgreen (DEN)	Deceuninck–Quick-Step	18
8	Marc Hirschi (SUI)	UAE Team Emirates	14
9	Samuele Battistella (ITA)	Astana–Premier Tech	14
10	Mathias Norsgaard (DEN)	Movistar Team	10

=== Team classification ===
Final team classification (1–10)
Rank	Team	Time
1	Team Bahrain Victorious	72h 47' 35"
2	Alpecin–Fenix	+ 9' 00"
3	Team Jumbo–Visma	+ 10' 15"
4	Ineos Grenadiers	+ 11' 41"
5	Israel Start-Up Nation	+ 14' 02"
6	UAE Team Emirates	+ 17' 51"
7	Lotto–Soudal	+ 19' 28"
8	Groupama–FDJ	+ 27' 42"
9	Intermarché–Wanty–Gobert Matériaux	+ 29' 08"
10	Team Qhubeka NextHash	+ 31' 30"
