= 2017 Vuelta a Burgos =

2017 UCI Europe Tour

Race details
- Dates: 1 August – 5 August
- Stages: 5
- Distance: 760 km (472.2 mi)
- Winning time: 18h 12' 47"

Results
Jersey awarded to the overall winner	Winner	Mikel Landa (ESP)	(Team Sky)
	Second	Enric Mas (ESP)	(Quick-Step Floors)
	Third	David de la Cruz (ESP)	(Quick-Step Floors)
Jersey awarded to the points classification winner	Points	Mikel Landa (ESP)	(Team Sky)
Jersey awarded to the mountains classification winner	Mountains	Mikel Landa (ESP)	(Team Sky)
Jersey awarded to the youth classification winner	Youth	Enric Mas (ESP)	(Quick-Step Floors)
	Team	(Kazakhstan) Astana	

The 2017 Vuelta a Burgos was a men's road bicycle race which was held from 1 August to 5 August 2017. It is the 39th edition of the Vuelta a Burgos stage race, which was established in 1946. The race was rated as a 2.HC event and forms part of the 2017 UCI Europe Tour. The race was made up of five stages.

== Teams ==
Eighteen teams entered the race. Each team had a maximum of eight riders:

UCI WorldTeams

- Movistar Team
- Team Sky
- Astana
- Quick-Step Floors
- Team Dimension Data

UCI Professional Continental teams

- Caja Rural–Seguros RGA
- Cofidis
- Sport Vlaanderen–Baloise
- Gazprom–RusVelo
- Direct Énergie
- Team Manzana Postobón
- Delko–Marseille Provence KTM
- Roompot–Nederlandse Loterij
- Aqua Blue Sport
- Nippo–Vini Fantini
- Fortuneo–Oscaro

UCI Continental teams

- Burgos BH
- Euskadi Basque Country–Murias

== Route ==
Stage characteristics and winners
Stage	Date	Course	Distance	Type	Winner
1	2 August	Burgos to Burgos	151 km (93.8 mi)	Flat stage	Mikel Landa (ESP)
2	3 August	Oña to Belorado	153 km (95.1 mi)	Flat stage	Matteo Trentin (ITA)
3	4 August	Ojo Guareña to Picón Blanco	173 km (107.5 mi)	Mountain stage	Mikel Landa (ESP)
4	5 August	Bodegas Nabal to Clunia	147 km (91.3 mi)	Flat stage	Carlos Barbero (ESP)
5	6 August	Comunero de Revenga to Lagunas de Neila	136 km (84.5 mi)	Mountain stage	Miguel Ángel López (COL)

== Stages ==
=== Stage 1 ===
Stage 1 result & General classification after Stage 1
Rank	Rider	Team	Time
1	Mikel Landa (ESP)	Team Sky	3h 25' 58"
2	Sergei Chernetckii (RUS)	Astana	+ 2"
3	Julian Alaphilippe (FRA)	Quick-Step Floors	+ 3"
4	Enric Mas (ESP)	Quick-Step Floors	+ 5"
5	Daniel Moreno (ESP)	Movistar Team	+ 7"
6	Carlos Barbero (ESP)	Movistar Team	+ 7"
7	Jetse Bol (NED)	Team Manzana Postobón	+ 7"
8	Sjoerd van Ginneken (NED)	Roompot–Nederlandse Loterij	+ 7"
9	Garikoitz Bravo (ESP)	Euskadi Basque Country–Murias	+ 7"
10	Mauro Finetto (ITA)	Delko–Marseille Provence KTM	+ 7"

=== Stage 2 ===
Stage 2 result
Rank	Rider	Team	Time
1	Matteo Trentin (ITA)	Quick-Step Floors	3h 38' 54"
2	Adam Blythe (GBR)	Aqua Blue Sport	s.t.
3	Tim Ariesen (NED)	Roompot–Nederlandse Loterij	s.t.
4	Romain Cardis (FRA)	Direct Énergie	s.t.
5	Pier Paolo De Negri (ITA)	Nippo–Vini Fantini	s.t.
6	Raymond Kreder (NED)	Roompot–Nederlandse Loterij	s.t.
7	Armindo Fonseca (FRA)	Fortuneo–Oscaro	s.t.
8	Eduard Prades (ESP)	Caja Rural–Seguros RGA	s.t.
9	Christophe Noppe (BEL)	Sport Vlaanderen–Baloise	s.t.
10	Aaron Gate (NZL)	Aqua Blue Sport	s.t.

General classification after Stage 2
Rank	Rider	Team	Time
1	Mikel Landa (ESP)	Team Sky	7h 04' 52"
2	Sergei Chernetckii (RUS)	Astana	+ 2"
3	Julian Alaphilippe (FRA)	Quick-Step Floors	+ 3"
4	Enric Mas (ESP)	Quick-Step Floors	+ 5"
5	Pier Paolo De Negri (ITA)	Nippo–Vini Fantini	+ 7"
6	Jetse Bol (NED)	Team Manzana Postobón	+ 7"
7	Jonas van Genechten (NED)	Cofidis	+ 7"
8	Carlos Barbero (ESP)	Movistar Team	+ 7"
9	Fabien Grellier (FRA)	Direct Énergie	+ 7"
10	Merhawi Kudus (ERI)	Team Dimension Data	+ 7"

=== Stage 3 ===
Stage 3 result
Rank	Rider	Team	Time
1	Mikel Landa (ESP)	Team Sky	4h 36' 40"
2	David de la Cruz (ESP)	Quick-Step Floors	+ 9"
3	Enric Mas (ESP)	Quick-Step Floors	+ 41"
4	Jaime Roson (ESP)	Caja Rural–Seguros RGA	+ 47"
5	Miguel Ángel López (COL)	Astana	+ 56"
6	Igor Anton (ESP)	Team Dimension Data	+ 1' 06"
7	Merhawi Kudus (ERI)	Team Dimension Data	+ 1' 24"
8	Gianni Moscon (ITA)	Team Sky	+ 1' 27"
9	Jetse Bol (NED)	Team Manzana Postobón	+ 1' 33"
10	Sergio Pardilla (ESP)	Caja Rural–Seguros RGA	+ 1' 34"

General classification after Stage 3
Rank	Rider	Team	Time
1	Mikel Landa (ESP)	Team Sky	11h 41' 32"
2	David de la Cruz (ESP)	Quick-Step Floors	+ 27"
3	Enric Mas (ESP)	Quick-Step Floors	+ 46"
4	Jaime Roson (ESP)	Caja Rural–Seguros RGA	+ 54"
5	Miguel Ángel López (COL)	Astana	+ 1' 02"
6	Igor Anton (ESP)	Team Dimension Data	+ 1' 13"
7	Merhawi Kudus (ERI)	Team Dimension Data	+ 1' 31"
8	Gianni Moscon (ITA)	Team Sky	+ 1' 34"
9	Jetse Bol (NED)	Team Manzana Postobón	+ 1' 40"
10	Sergei Chernetckii (RUS)	Astana	+ 1' 42"

=== Stage 4 ===
Stage 4 result
Rank	Rider	Team	Time
1	Carlos Barbero (ESP)	Movistar Team	3h 19' 19"
2	Gianni Moscon (ITA)	Team Sky	s.t.
3	Julian Alaphilippe (FRA)	Quick-Step Floors	s.t.
4	Mauro Finetto (ITA)	Delko–Marseille Provence KTM	+ 3"
5	Merhawi Kudus (ERI)	Team Dimension Data	+ 3"
6	Matteo Trentin (ITA)	Quick-Step Floors	+ 3"
7	Jonas van Genechten (BEL)	Cofidis	+ 3"
8	Eduard Prades (ESP)	Caja Rural–Seguros RGA	+ 3"
9	Eliot Lietaer (BEL)	Sport Vlaanderen–Baloise	+ 3"
10	Daniel Moreno (ESP)	Movistar Team	+ 3"

General classification after Stage 4
Rank	Rider	Team	Time
1	Mikel Landa (ESP)	Team Sky	15h 00' 54"
2	David de la Cruz (ESP)	Quick-Step Floors	+ 27"
3	Enric Mas (ESP)	Quick-Step Floors	+ 46"
4	Jaime Roson (ESP)	Caja Rural–Seguros RGA	+ 54"
5	Miguel Ángel López (COL)	Astana	+ 1' 02"
6	Igor Anton (ESP)	Team Dimension Data	+ 1' 13"
7	Merhawi Kudus (ERI)	Team Dimension Data	+ 1' 31"
8	Gianni Moscon (ITA)	Team Sky	+ 1' 31"
9	Jetse Bol (NED)	Team Manzana Postobón	+ 1' 40"
10	Sergei Chernetckii (RUS)	Astana	+ 1' 42"

=== Stage 5 ===
Stage 5 result
Rank	Rider	Team	Time
1	Miguel Ángel López (COL)	Astana	3h 11' 42"
2	Enric Mas (ESP)	Quick-Step Floors	+ 5"
3	Mikel Landa (ESP)	Team Sky	+ 11"
4	David de la Cruz (ESP)	Quick-Step Floors	+ 30"
5	Jaime Roson (ESP)	Caja Rural–Seguros RGA	+ 35"
6	Igor Anton (ESP)	Team Dimension Data	+ 35"
7	Daniel Moreno (ESP)	Movistar Team	+ 37"
8	Sergei Chernetckii (RUS)	Astana	+ 48"
9	Ángel Madrazo (ESP)	Delko–Marseille Provence KTM	+ 1' 01"
9	Eliot Lietaer (BEL)	Sport Vlaanderen–Baloise	+ 1' 01"

Final general classification after Stage 5
Rank	Rider	Team	Time
1	Mikel Landa (ESP)	Team Sky	18h 12' 47"
2	Enric Mas (ESP)	Quick-Step Floors	+ 40"
3	David de la Cruz (ESP)	Quick-Step Floors	+ 46"
4	Miguel Ángel López (COL)	Astana	+ 51"
5	Jaime Roson (ESP)	Caja Rural–Seguros RGA	+ 1' 18"
6	Igor Anton (ESP)	Team Dimension Data	+ 1' 37"
7	Daniel Moreno (ESP)	Movistar Team	+ 2' 13"
8	Sergei Chernetckii (RUS)	Astana	+ 2' 19"
9	Merhawi Kudus (ERI)	Team Dimension Data	+ 2' 40"
10	Jetse Bol (NED)	Team Manzana Postobón	+ 2' 49"

== Classification leadership ==
Stage	Winner	General classification	Points classification	Mountains classification	Young rider classification	Sprints classification "Meta Volantes"	Burgos rider classification	Castilla y León rider classification	Spanish rider classification	Team classification
1	Mikel Landa	Mikel Landa	Mikel Landa	Mikel Landa	Enric Mas	Ben King	Carlos Barbero	Jaime Roson	Mikel Landa	Team Sky
2	Matteo Trentin	Mikel Landa	Mikel Landa	Daniel Diaz	Enric Mas	Ben King	Carlos Barbero	Jaime Roson	Mikel Landa	Team Sky
3	Mikel Landa	Mikel Landa	Mikel Landa	Mikel Landa	Enric Mas	Ben King	Carlos Barbero	Jaime Roson	Mikel Landa	Astana
4	Carlos Barbero	Mikel Landa	Mikel Landa	Mikel Landa	Enric Mas	Ben King	Carlos Barbero	Jaime Roson	Mikel Landa	Astana
5	Miguel Ángel López	Mikel Landa	Mikel Landa	Mikel Landa	Enric Mas	Ben King	Carlos Barbero	Jaime Roson	Mikel Landa	Astana
Final		Mikel Landa	Mikel Landa	Mikel Landa	Enric Mas	Ben King	Carlos Barbero	Jaime Roson	Mikel Landa	Astana
