= Taco van der Hoorn =

Dutch cyclist (born 1993)

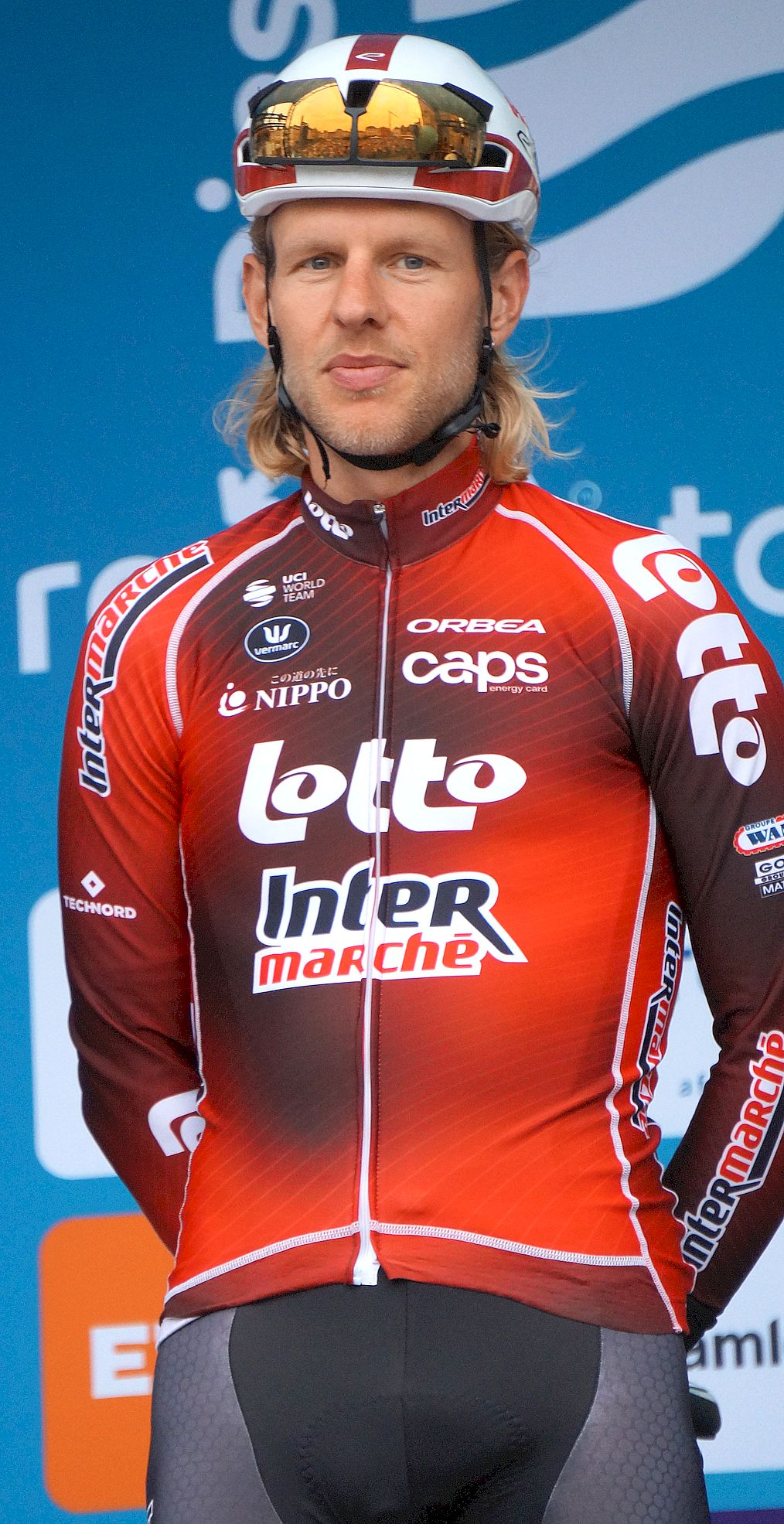
- Taco van der Hoorn in 2026

Personal information
- Full name: Taco van der Hoorn
- Born: 4 December 1993 (age 32) Rotterdam, Netherlands
- Height: 1.87 m (6 ft 2 in)
- Weight: 75 kg (165 lb)

Cycling career
- Sport: Cycling
- Current team: Lotto–Intermarché
- Discipline: Road
- Role: Rider
- Rider type: Classics specialist

Amateur team
- 2014: Belkin–De Jonge Renner

Professional teams
- 2015–2016: Cyclingteam de Rijke
- 2017–2018: Roompot–Nederlandse Loterij
- 2019–2020: Team Jumbo–Visma
- 2021–2025: Intermarché–Wanty–Gobert Matériaux
- 2026–: Lotto–Intermarché

Major wins
- Grand Tours Giro d'Italia 1 individual stage (2021) One-day races and Classics Brussels Cycling Classic (2022) Primus Classic (2018)

Taco van der Hoorn (born 4 December 1993) is a Dutch cyclist who currently rides for UCI WorldTeam Lotto–Intermarché.

== Career ==
For the 2021 season, van der Hoorn initially announced a contract with the BEAT Cycling, but the following month, he signed a deal with the Intermarché–Wanty–Gobert Matériaux team. He won stage 3 of the 2021 Giro d'Italia, during his first Grand Tour.

Taco van der Hoorn came second during 'mini Paris-Roubaix' cobble stage from Lille Métropole to Arenberg in the 2022 Tour de France. He lost by a tire-width margin from Australian cyclist Simon Clarke.

== Major results ==
2011
1st Guido Reybrouck Classic
2014
7th Zuid Oost Drenthe Classic I
2016
2nd ZODC Zuidenveld Tour
8th Overall An Post Rás

1st Stage 1

9th Schaal Sels-Merksem
10th Gooikse Pijl
2017 (1 pro win)
1st Schaal Sels
2nd Dwars door het Hageland
2nd Tacx Pro Classic
4th Slag om Norg
8th Grote Prijs Jean-Pierre Monseré
9th Famenne Ardenne Classic
2018 (2)
1st Primus Classic
1st Nationale Sluitingprijs
1st Stage 3 BinckBank Tour
3rd Antwerp Port Epic
4th Binche–Chimay–Binche
5th Druivenkoers Overijse
9th Paris–Tours
10th Slag om Norg
2019
3rd Omloop van het Houtland
2021 (3)
1st Omloop van het Houtland
1st Stage 3 Giro d'Italia
1st Stage 3 Benelux Tour
1st Active rider classification, Tour de Pologne
2nd Antwerp Port Epic
2022 (1)
1st Brussels Cycling Classic
3rd Road race, National Road Championships
10th Kuurne–Brussels–Kuurne
2023
4th Kuurne–Brussels–Kuurne
8th Grand Prix de Denain
2024 (1)
1st Elfstedenrace

=== Grand Tour general classification results timeline ===
Grand Tour	2021	2022	2023	2024	2025
Giro d'Italia	107	—	—	—	155
Tour de France	—	125	—	—	—
Vuelta a España	—	—	—	—	—

Legend
—	Did not compete
DNF	Did not finish
