= 2019 Grote Prijs Jef Scherens =

2019 UCI Europe Tour

Race details
- Dates: 1 September 2018
- Stages: 1
- Distance: 185.7 km (115.4 mi)

Results
	Winner	Niccolò Bonifazio (ITA)	(Total Direct Énergie)
	Second	Hugo Hofstetter (FRA)	(Cofidis)
	Third	Timothy Dupont (BEL)	(Wanty–Gobert)

The 2019 Grote Prijs Jef Scherens was the 53rd edition of the Grote Prijs Jef Scherens road cycling one day race in and around Leuven. It was held on 16 August 2018 as a 1.1 categorised race and was part of the 2018 UCI Europe Tour and the 2018 Belgian Road Cycling Cup.

The race ended in a bunch sprint of roughly 50 riders, with Niccolò Bonifazio taking the victory ahead of Hugo Hofstetter. Timothy Dupont took third place, thereby managing to end on the podium for the third year running, after also becoming third in the 2018 Grote Prijs Jef Scherens and winning the 2017 edition. Defending champion Jasper Stuyven did not take part this year.

== Teams ==
Twenty-three teams were invited to take part in the race. These included eleven UCI Professional Continental teams and twelve UCI Continental teams.

UCI Professional Continental Teams

- Cofidis
- Corendon–Circus
- Hagens Berman Axeon
- Israel Cycling Academy
- Roompot–Charles
- Riwal Readynez
- Sport Vlaanderen–Baloise
- Vital Concept–B&B Hotels
- Wallonie Bruxelles
- Wanty–Gobert
- Total Direct Énergie

UCI Continental Teams

- BEAT Cycling Club
- Cibel–Cebon
- Development Team Sunweb
- EvoPro Racing
- IAM–Excelsior
- Leopard Pro Cycling
- Monkey Town–à Bloc
- Tarteletto–Isorex
- Team ColoQuick
- Team Coop
- Team Differdange–Geba
- Wibatech Merx 7R

== Result ==
Result
Rank	Rider	Team	Time
1	Niccolò Bonifazio (ITA)	Total Direct Énergie	4h 16' 50"
2	Hugo Hofstetter (FRA)	Cofidis	s.t.
3	Timothy Dupont (BEL)	Wanty–Gobert	s.t.
4	Christophe Noppe (BEL)	Sport Vlaanderen–Baloise	s.t.
5	Gianni Vermeersch (BEL)	Corendon–Circus	s.t.
6	Amaury Capiot (BEL)	Sport Vlaanderen–Baloise	s.t.
7	Sjoerd van Ginneken (NED)	Roompot–Charles	s.t.
8	Tom Van Asbroeck (BEL)	Israel Cycling Academy	s.t.
9	André Carvalho (POR)	Hagens Berman Axeon	s.t.
10	Piotr Havik (NED)	Canyon dhb p/b Bloor Homes	s.t.
