= Felix Großschartner =

Austrian cyclist (born 1993)

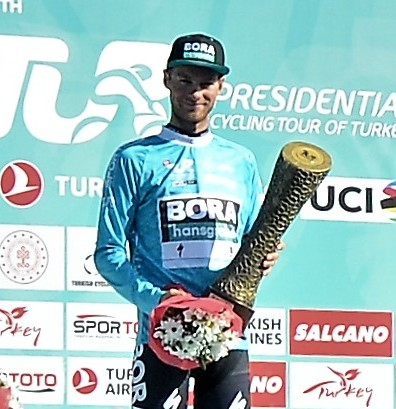
- Großschartner in 2019

Personal information
- Born: 23 December 1993 (age 32) Wels, Austria
- Height: 1.84 m (6 ft 0 in)
- Weight: 64 kg (141 lb)

Cycling career
- Sport: Cycling
- Current team: UAE Team Emirates XRG
- Discipline: Road
- Role: Rider
- Rider type: Climber

Amateur team
- 2011: Oberösterreich

Professional teams
- 2012–2015: RC Arbö–Wels–Gourmetfein
- 2015: Tinkoff–Saxo (stagiaire)
- 2016–2017: CCC–Sprandi–Polkowice
- 2018–2022: Bora–Hansgrohe
- 2023–: UAE Team Emirates

Major wins
- Grand Tours Vuelta a España 1 TTT stage (2025) Stage races Tour of Turkey (2019) One-day races and Classics National Road Race Championships (2022) National Time Trial Championships (2022, 2024)

Felix Großschartner (born 23 December 1993) is an Austrian cyclist, who currently rides for UCI WorldTeam UAE Team Emirates XRG.

== Career ==
Großschartner was born on 23 December 1999, in Wels. He turned professional in 2012 with RC Arbö–Wels–Gourmetfein. In 2016, he joined UCI Professional Continental team CCC–Sprandi–Polkowice. With this team, he competed in his first Grand Tour: the 2017 Giro d'Italia.

=== Bora–Hansgrohe (2018–2022) ===
In September 2017, Großschartner signed a contract to ride for the Bora–Hansgrohe team in the 2018 season. In April 2019, Großschartner took his first overall stage race victory at the Presidential Tour of Turkey, having won the summit finish to the ski resort south of Kartepe. In August 2019, he was named in the start list for the Vuelta a España.

In August 2020, Großschartner was named in the start list for the Tour de France. He achieved his best result in a Grand Tour later that season, by finishing the Vuelta a España in ninth place overall. He was again selected by Bora–Hansgrohe as their primary general classification contender for the 2021 Vuelta a España, and he finished in tenth place overall.

In 2022, Großschartner took his first senior national championship titles, winning both the Austrian National Road Race Championships and the Austrian National Time Trial Championships.

=== UAE Team Emirates (2023–present) ===
In August 2022, Großschartner signed a two-year contract with UAE Team Emirates starting in 2023. In his first year with the team, he finished second overall at the Deutschland Tour and third in the Bretagne Classic.

== Major results ==
2012
1st Stage 1 (TTT) Tour of Szeklerland
2013
10th Overall Circuit des Ardennes
10th Overall Course de la Paix U23
2014
3rd Overall Istrian Spring Trophy
5th Trofeo Banca Popolare di Vicenza
2015
1st Trofeo Banca Popolare di Vicenza
1st Mountains classification, Tour of Austria
3rd Road race, National Under-23 Road Championships
4th Raiffeisen Grand Prix
5th Overall Oberösterreich Rundfahrt
7th Giro del Belvedere
8th Overall Rhône-Alpes Isère Tour
8th Overall Giro della Regione Friuli Venezia Giulia

1st Stage 2

9th Overall Istrian Spring Trophy
10th GP Izola
2016
4th Overall Tour of Croatia
7th Overall Czech Cycling Tour
2017
3rd Overall Tour of Austria
4th Overall Tour of Croatia
10th Overall Czech Cycling Tour
2018
National Road Championships

2nd Road race
3rd Time trial

2nd Overall Tour of Guangxi
7th Grand Prix of Aargau Canton
9th Overall Volta ao Algarve
10th Overall Paris–Nice
10th Trofeo Serra de Tramuntana
2019 (2 pro wins)
1st Overall Tour of Turkey

1st Stage 5

4th Overall Tour de Romandie
4th Overall Czech Cycling Tour
5th Overall Tour of Guangxi
5th Overall Vuelta a San Juan
8th Overall Tour of California
2020 (1)
1st Stage 1 Vuelta a Burgos
9th Overall Vuelta a España
9th Overall Paris–Nice
2021 (1)
1st Stage 5 Tour of the Alps
4th Overall Settimana Ciclistica Italiana
10th Overall Vuelta a España
2022 (2)
National Road Championships

1st Road race
1st Time trial

7th Overall Tour de Suisse
2023
1st Championnats d'Europe des Grimpeurs
2nd Overall Deutschland Tour
3rd Bretagne Classic
3rd Giro della Toscana
4th Overall Saudi Tour
6th GP Industria & Artigianato di Larciano
7th Overall Tour de Luxembourg
9th Overall Tour of Guangxi
2024 (1)
National Road Championships

1st Time trial
3rd Road race

1st Stage 3 (TTT) Paris–Nice
4th Overall Tour of Austria
7th Overall Volta a la Comunitat Valenciana
2025
1st Stage 5 (TTT) Vuelta a España
2nd Road race, National Road Championships
2nd Overall Tour of Slovenia
7th GP Miguel Induráin
10th Overall Tour of Austria
2026
6th Trofeo Serra Tramuntana
8th Figueira Champions Classic

=== General classification results timeline ===
Grand Tour general classification results
Grand Tour	2016	2017	2018	2019	2020	2021	2022	2023	2024
Giro d'Italia	—	78	27	—	—	42	—	—	31
Tour de France	—	—	—	—	63	—	53	23	
Vuelta a España	—	—	—	36	9	10	—	—	
Major stage race general classification results
Race	2016	2017	2018	2019	2020	2021	2022	2023	2024
Paris–Nice	—	—	10	12	9	73	DNF	54	30
Tirreno–Adriatico	Has not contested during his career								
Volta a Catalunya	92	18	—	—	NH	—	—	—	130
Tour of the Basque Country	—	—	46	—	NH	—	OTL	DNF	—
Tour de Romandie	—	—	—	4	NH	—	28	—	62
Critérium du Dauphiné	—	—	—	53	61	—	—	—	21
Tour de Suisse	28	DNF	—	—	NH	—	7	—	—

Legend
—	Did not compete
DNF	Did not finish
OTL	Outside time limit
NH	Not held
IP	In progress
