= 2023 Giro di Toscana =

2023 Giro della Toscana
- 2023 UCI Europe Tour

Race details
- Dates: 13 September 2023
- Stages: 1
- Distance: 191.55 km (119.0 mi)
- Winning time: 4h 25' 57"

Results
	Winner	Pavel Sivakov (FRA)	(Ineos Grenadiers)
	Second	Richard Carapaz (ECU)	(EF Education–EasyPost)
	Third	Felix Großschartner (AUT)	(UAE Team Emirates)

The 2023 Giro della Toscana was the 95th edition of the Giro di Toscana road cycling one-day race that was held on 13 September 2023. It was held as a 1.1 event on the UCI Europe Tour calendar. The race was won by Pavel Sivakov of Ineos Grenadiers.

== Teams ==
Seven UCI WorldTeams, six UCI ProTeams, four UCI Continental teams and one regional team made up the eighteen teams that participated in the race.

UCI WorldTeams

- Astana Qazaqstan Team
- Cofidis
- EF Education–EasyPost
- Ineos Grenadiers
- Intermarché–Circus–Wanty
- Team Jayco–AlUla
- UAE Team Emirates

UCI ProTeams

- Eolo–Kometa
- Euskaltel–Euskadi
- Green Project–Bardiani–CSF–Faizanè
- Q36.5 Pro Cycling Team
- Team TotalEnergies
- Team Corratec–Selle Italia

UCI Continental Teams

- Electro Hiper Europa
- GW Shimano–Sidermec
- MG.K vis Colors for Peace
- Work Service–Vitalcare–Dynatek

Regional Team

- Emilia-Romagna

== Result ==
Result
Rank	Rider	Team	Time
1	Pavel Sivakov (FRA)	Ineos Grenadiers	4h 25' 57"
2	Richard Carapaz (ECU)	EF Education–EasyPost	+ 4"
3	Felix Großschartner (AUT)	UAE Team Emirates	+ 45"
4	Tadej Pogačar (SLO)	UAE Team Emirates	+ 1' 28"
5	Filippo Zana (ITA)	Team Jayco–AlUla	+ 1' 28"
6	Davide Formolo (ITA)	UAE Team Emirates	+ 1' 33"
7	Ethan Hayter (GBR)	Ineos Grenadiers	+ 1' 58"
8	Vincenzo Albanese (ITA)	Eolo–Kometa	+ 1' 58"
9	Gianluca Brambilla (ITA)	Q36.5 Pro Cycling Team	+ 1' 58"
10	Georg Zimmermann (GER)	Intermarché–Circus–Wanty	+ 1' 58"
