= 2022 Brussels Cycling Classic =

2022 UCI ProSeries
- Event poster with previous winner Remco Evenepoel

Race details
- Dates: 5 June 2022
- Stages: 1
- Distance: 203.9 km (126.7 mi)
- Winning time: 4h 45' 03"

Results
	Winner	Taco van der Hoorn (NED)	(Intermarché–Wanty–Gobert Matériaux)
	Second	Thimo Willems (BEL)	(Minerva Cycling Team)
	Third	Tobias Bayer (AUT)	(Alpecin–Fenix)

The 2022 Brussels Cycling Classic was the 102nd edition of the Brussels Cycling Classic road cycling one day race, which was held on 5 June 2022 as part of the 2022 UCI ProSeries calendar.

== Teams ==
Eleven UCI WorldTeams, seven UCI ProTeams, and two UCI Continental teams make up the twenty teams that participate in the race.

UCI WorldTeams

- AG2R Citroën Team
- Bora–Hansgrohe
- Cofidis
- Groupama–FDJ
- Ineos Grenadiers
- Intermarché–Wanty–Gobert Matériaux
- Israel–Premier Tech
- Lotto–Soudal
- Quick-Step Alpha Vinyl Team
- Team BikeExchange–Jayco
- UAE Team Emirates

UCI ProTeams

- Alpecin–Fenix
- Arkéa–Samsic
- B&B Hotels–KTM
- Bingoal Pauwels Sauces WB
- Burgos BH
- Sport Vlaanderen–Baloise
- Uno-X Pro Cycling Team

UCI Continental Teams

- Minerva Cycling Team
- Tarteletto–Isorex

== Result ==
Result
Rank	Rider	Team	Time
1	Taco van der Hoorn (NED)	Intermarché–Wanty–Gobert Matériaux	4h 45' 03"
2	Thimo Willems (BEL)	Minerva Cycling Team	+ 0"
3	Tobias Bayer (AUT)	Alpecin–Fenix	+ 0"
4	Rune Herregodts (BEL)	Sport Vlaanderen–Baloise	+ 7"
5	Gilles De Wilde (BEL)	Sport Vlaanderen–Baloise	+ 7"
6	Arjen Livyns (BEL)	Bingoal Pauwels Sauces WB	+ 7"
7	Bram Welten (NED)	Groupama–FDJ	+ 7"
8	Gianni Marchand (BEL)	Tarteletto–Isorex	+ 10"
9	Alexander Kristoff (NOR)	Intermarché–Wanty–Gobert Matériaux	+ 23"
10	Laurenz Rex (BEL)	Bingoal Pauwels Sauces WB	+ 23"
