= Nicola Bagioli =

Italian cyclist (born 1995)

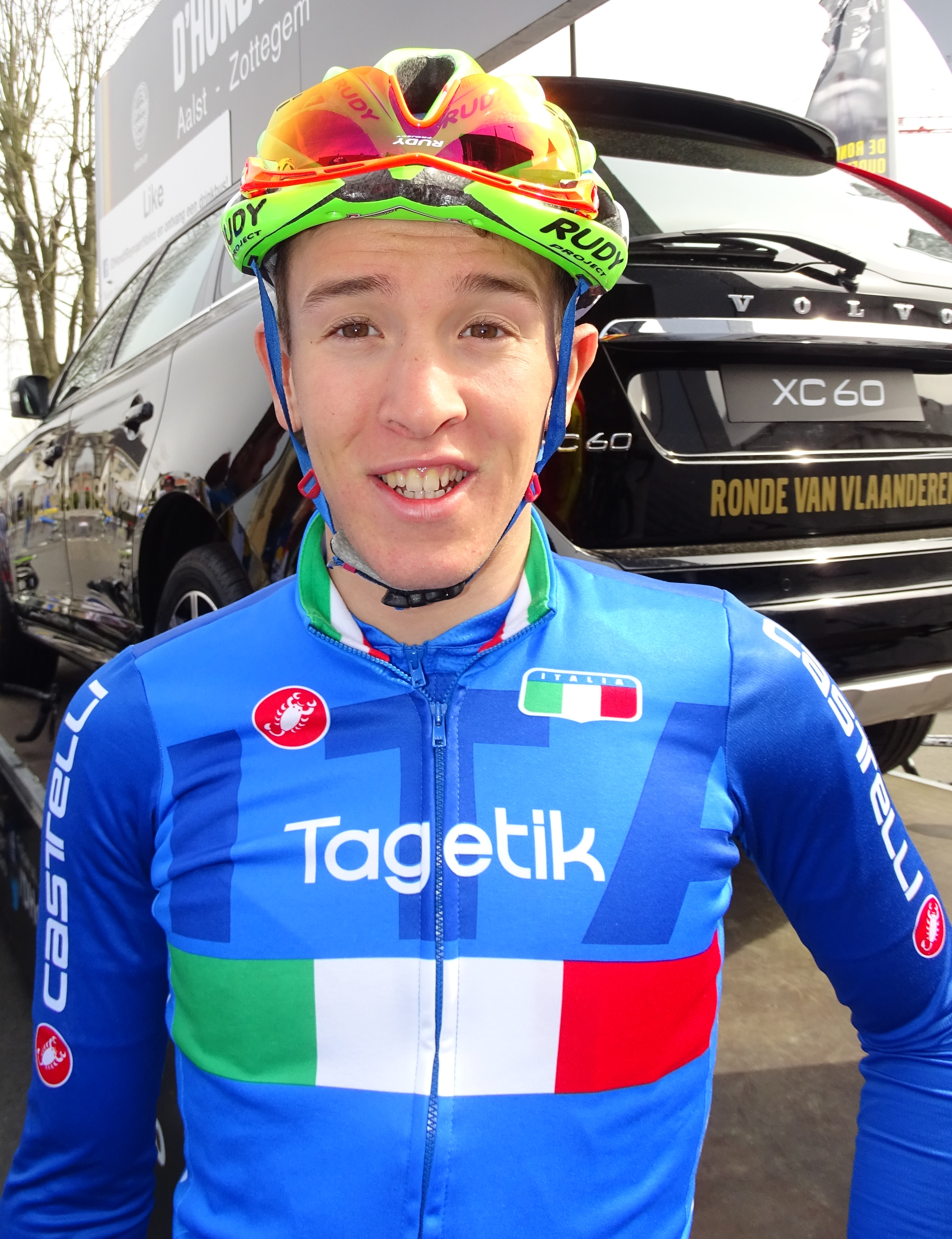
- Bagioli in 2016.

Personal information
- Full name: Nicola Bagioli
- Born: 19 February 1995 (age 31) Sondrio, Italy
- Height: 1.68 m (5 ft 6 in)
- Weight: 64 kg (141 lb)

Cycling career
- Sport: Cycling
- Current team: Retired
- Discipline: Road
- Role: Rider

Amateur teams
- 2014: Delio Gallina Colosio Eurofeed
- 2015–2016: Zalf–Euromobil–Désirée–Fior
- 2016: Nippo–Vini Fantini (stagiaire)

Professional teams
- 2017–2019: Nippo–Vini Fantini
- 2020: Androni Giocattoli–Sidermec
- 2021: B&B Hotels p/b KTM

Nicola Bagioli (born 19 February 1995 in Sondrio) is an Italian former cyclist, who competed as a professional from 2017 to 2021. He is the older brother of fellow racing cyclist Andrea Bagioli. Bagioli began cycling at the age of nine with Alpin Bike Sondrio. He initially focused on mountain biking before switching to road cycling as a junior. He retired from the sport at the end of the 2021 season, at the age of 26, a year before the end of his contract with the B&B Hotels–KTM team. He now runs a soapstone processing company.

In May 2019, he was named in the startlist for the 2019 Giro d'Italia.

== Major results ==
2016
2nd Giro del Belvedere
3rd Trofeo Città di San Vendemiano
2018
1st Mountains classification, Tirreno–Adriatico
7th Overall Tour du Haut Var
2019
2nd Trofeo Laigueglia
3rd Ronde van Drenthe
2020
7th Gran Trittico Lombardo

=== Grand Tour general classification results timeline ===
| Grand Tour | 2019 |
|---|---|
| Giro d'Italia | DNF |
| Tour de France | — |
| Vuelta a España | — |
