= 2017 Tour of Croatia =

2017 UCI Europe Tour
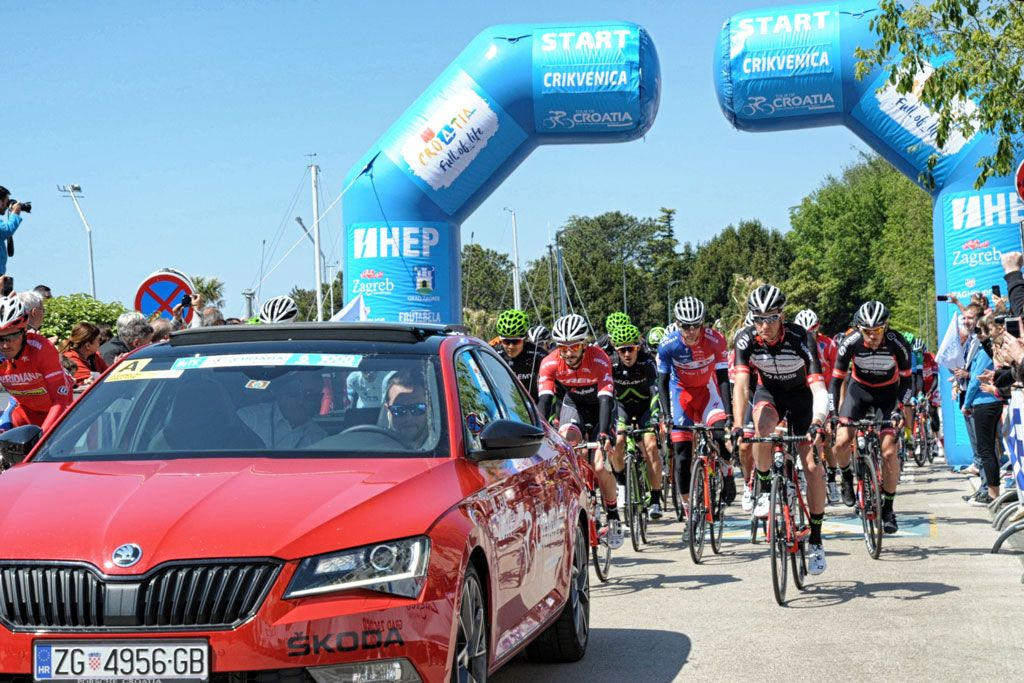
- Start of stage 4 in Crikvenica

Race details
- Dates: 18–23 April 2017
- Stages: 6
- Distance: 1,030.7 km (640.4 mi)
- Winning time: 25h 12' 10"

Results
Jersey awarded to the overall winner	Winner	Vincenzo Nibali (ITA)	(Bahrain–Merida)
	Second	Jaime Rosón (ESP)	(Caja Rural–Seguros RGA)
	Third	Jan Hirt (CZE)	(CCC–Sprandi–Polkowice)
Jersey awarded to the points classification winner	Points	Nicola Ruffoni (ITA)	(Bardiani–CSF)
Jersey awarded to the mountains classification winner	Mountains	Jaime Rosón (ESP)	(Caja Rural–Seguros RGA)
Jersey awarded to the young rider classification winner	Young rider	Michal Schlegel (CZE)	(CCC–Sprandi–Polkowice)
	Team	(Poland) CCC–Sprandi–Polkowice	

The 2017 Tour of Croatia was a road cycling stage race that took place in Croatia between 18 and 23 April 2017. It was the third edition of the Tour of Croatia since its revival in 2015 and was rated a 2.1 event as part of the UCI Europe Tour.

The race was won by Bahrain–Merida's Vincenzo Nibali.

== Teams ==
Twenty teams were invited to start the race. These included four UCI WorldTeams, seven UCI Professional Continental teams and nine UCI Continental teams.

UCI WorldTeams

- Astana
- Bahrain–Merida
- Trek–Segafredo
- UAE Team Emirates

UCI Professional Continental teams

- Bardiani–CSF
- Caja Rural–Seguros RGA
- CCC–Sprandi–Polkowice
- Gazprom–RusVelo
- Israel Cycling Academy
- Nippo–Vini Fantini
- Team Novo Nordisk

UCI Continental teams

- Adria Mobil
- Bicicletas Strongman
- Team Felbermayr–Simplon Wels
- GM Europa Ovini
- Kolss Cycling Team
- Meridiana–Kamen
- Roth–Akros
- Torku Şekerspor
- WIGGINS

== Schedule ==
The second stage of the race was scheduled for 123 kilometres (76 miles), but was shortened due to poor weather conditions.

Stage schedule
Stage	Date	Route	Distance	Type	Winner
1	18 April	Osijek to Koprivnica	227 km (141.1 mi)	Flat stage	Sacha Modolo (ITA)
2	19 April	Trogir to Biokovo	107.7 km (66.9 mi) (Note: Stage reduced from 123 km (76 mi), due to poor weather.)	Mountain stage	Kristijan Đurasek (CRO)
3	20 April	Imotski to Zadar	237 km (147.3 mi)	Hilly stage	Nicola Ruffoni (ITA)
4	21 April	Crikvenica to Umag	171 km (106.3 mi)	Hilly stage	Nicola Ruffoni (ITA)
5	22 April	Poreč to Učka	141 km (87.6 mi)	Mountain stage	Jaime Rosón (ESP)
6	23 April	Samobor to Zagreb	147 km (91.3 mi)	Flat stage	Sacha Modolo (ITA)

== Stages ==
=== Stage 1 ===
18 April 2017 – Osijek to Koprivnica, 227 km (141.1 mi)

Stage 1 result
Rank	Rider	Team	Time
1	Sacha Modolo (ITA)	UAE Team Emirates	5h 24' 19"
2	Eduard-Michael Grosu (ROU)	Nippo–Vini Fantini	+ 0"
3	Nicolas Marini (ITA)	Nippo–Vini Fantini	+ 0"
4	Dylan Page (SUI)	Caja Rural–Seguros RGA	+ 0"
5	Giacomo Nizzolo (ITA)	Trek–Segafredo	+ 0"
6	Riccardo Minali (ITA)	Astana	+ 0"
7	Marco Canola (ITA)	Nippo–Vini Fantini	+ 0"
8	Ivan Savitskiy (RUS)	Gazprom–RusVelo	+ 0"
9	Martijn Verschoor (NED)	Team Novo Nordisk	+ 0"
10	Dušan Rajović (SRB)	Adria Mobil	+ 0"

General classification after Stage 1
Rank	Rider	Team	Time
1	Sacha Modolo (ITA)	UAE Team Emirates	5h 24' 09"
2	Eduard-Michael Grosu (ROU)	Nippo–Vini Fantini	+ 2"
3	Nicolas Marini (ITA)	Nippo–Vini Fantini	+ 6"
4	Riccardo Minali (ITA)	Astana	+ 7"
5	Nikolay Trusov (RUS)	Gazprom–RusVelo	+ 7"
6	Jannik Steimle (GER)	Team Felbermayr–Simplon Wels	+ 7"
7	Michael O'Loughlin (IRL)	WIGGINS	+ 7"
8	Dylan Page (SUI)	Caja Rural–Seguros RGA	+ 10"
9	Giacomo Nizzolo (ITA)	Trek–Segafredo	+ 10"
10	Marco Canola (ITA)	Nippo–Vini Fantini	+ 10"

=== Stage 2 ===
19 April 2017 – Trogir to Biokovo, 107.7 km (66.9 mi)

Stage 2 result
Rank	Rider	Team	Time
1	Kristijan Đurasek (CRO)	UAE Team Emirates	2h 43' 38"
2	Jaime Rosón (ESP)	Caja Rural–Seguros RGA	+ 0"
3	Vincenzo Nibali (ITA)	Bahrain–Merida	+ 3"
4	Jan Hirt (CZE)	CCC–Sprandi–Polkowice	+ 3"
5	Felix Großschartner (AUT)	CCC–Sprandi–Polkowice	+ 9"
6	Kanstantsin Sivtsov (BLR)	Bahrain–Merida	+ 14"
7	Przemysław Niemiec (POL)	UAE Team Emirates	+ 21"
8	Jan Polanc (SLO)	UAE Team Emirates	+ 21"
9	Branislau Samoilau (BLR)	CCC–Sprandi–Polkowice	+ 26"
10	James Knox (GBR)	WIGGINS	+ 26"

General classification after Stage 2
Rank	Rider	Team	Time
1	Kristijan Đurasek (CRO)	UAE Team Emirates	8h 07' 47"
2	Jaime Rosón (ESP)	Caja Rural–Seguros RGA	+ 4"
3	Vincenzo Nibali (ITA)	Bahrain–Merida	+ 9"
4	Jan Hirt (CZE)	CCC–Sprandi–Polkowice	+ 13"
5	Felix Großschartner (AUT)	CCC–Sprandi–Polkowice	+ 19"
6	Kanstantsin Sivtsov (BLR)	Bahrain–Merida	+ 24"
7	Jan Polanc (SLO)	UAE Team Emirates	+ 31"
8	Przemysław Niemiec (POL)	UAE Team Emirates	+ 31"
9	Óscar Eduardo Sánchez (COL)	Bicicletas Strongman	+ 36"
10	Michal Schlegel (CZE)	CCC–Sprandi–Polkowice	+ 36"

=== Stage 3 ===
20 April 2017 – Imotski to Zadar, 237 km (147.3 mi)

Stage 3 result
Rank	Rider	Team	Time
1	Nicola Ruffoni (ITA)	Bardiani–CSF	5h 55' 27"
2	Giacomo Nizzolo (ITA)	Trek–Segafredo	+ 0"
3	Riccardo Minali (ITA)	Astana	+ 0"
4	Ahmet Örken (TUR)	Torku Şekerspor	+ 0"
5	Eduard-Michael Grosu (ROU)	Nippo–Vini Fantini	+ 0"
6	Roberto Ferrari (ITA)	UAE Team Emirates	+ 0"
7	Marco Canola (ITA)	Nippo–Vini Fantini	+ 0"
8	Daniel Auer (AUT)	Team Felbermayr–Simplon Wels	+ 0"
9	Ivan Savitskiy (RUS)	Gazprom–RusVelo	+ 0"
10	Nicolas Marini (ITA)	Nippo–Vini Fantini	+ 0"

General classification after Stage 3
Rank	Rider	Team	Time
1	Jaime Rosón (ESP)	Caja Rural–Seguros RGA	14h 03' 18"
2	Vincenzo Nibali (ITA)	Bahrain–Merida	+ 5"
3	Jan Hirt (CZE)	CCC–Sprandi–Polkowice	+ 9"
4	Felix Großschartner (AUT)	CCC–Sprandi–Polkowice	+ 15"
5	Kanstantsin Sivtsov (BLR)	Bahrain–Merida	+ 20"
6	Jan Polanc (SLO)	UAE Team Emirates	+ 27"
7	Óscar Eduardo Sánchez (COL)	Bicicletas Strongman	+ 32"
8	James Knox (GBR)	WIGGINS	+ 32"
9	Branislau Samoilau (BLR)	CCC–Sprandi–Polkowice	+ 32"
10	Carlos Becerra (COL)	Bicicletas Strongman	+ 32"

=== Stage 4 ===
21 April 2017 – Crikvenica to Umag, 171 km (106.3 mi)

Stage 4 result
Rank	Rider	Team	Time
1	Nicola Ruffoni (ITA)	Bardiani–CSF	4h 10' 15"
2	Riccardo Minali (ITA)	Astana	+ 0"
3	Ivan Savitskiy (RUS)	Gazprom–RusVelo	+ 0"
4	Marco Canola (ITA)	Nippo–Vini Fantini	+ 0"
5	Dušan Rajović (SRB)	Adria Mobil	+ 0"
6	Alan Marangoni (ITA)	Nippo–Vini Fantini	+ 0"
7	Daniel Auer (AUT)	Team Felbermayr–Simplon Wels	+ 0"
8	Giacomo Nizzolo (ITA)	Trek–Segafredo	+ 0"
9	Eduard-Michael Grosu (ROU)	Nippo–Vini Fantini	+ 0"
10	Gašper Katrašnik (SLO)	Adria Mobil	+ 0"

General classification after Stage 4
Rank	Rider	Team	Time
1	Vincenzo Nibali (ITA)	Bahrain–Merida	18h 13' 38"
2	Jaime Rosón (ESP)	Caja Rural–Seguros RGA	+ 2"
3	Jan Hirt (CZE)	CCC–Sprandi–Polkowice	+ 11"
4	Kanstantsin Sivtsov (BLR)	Bahrain–Merida	+ 15"
5	Felix Großschartner (AUT)	CCC–Sprandi–Polkowice	+ 17"
6	Óscar Eduardo Sánchez (COL)	Bicicletas Strongman	+ 27"
7	Jan Polanc (SLO)	UAE Team Emirates	+ 29"
8	James Knox (GBR)	WIGGINS	+ 34"
9	Branislau Samoilau (BLR)	CCC–Sprandi–Polkowice	+ 34"
10	Michal Schlegel (CZE)	CCC–Sprandi–Polkowice	+ 34"

=== Stage 5 ===
22 April 2017 – Poreč to Učka, 141 km (87.6 mi)

Stage 5 result
Rank	Rider	Team	Time
1	Jaime Rosón (ESP)	Caja Rural–Seguros RGA	3h 41' 47"
2	Vincenzo Nibali (ITA)	Bahrain–Merida	+ 0"
3	Jan Hirt (CZE)	CCC–Sprandi–Polkowice	+ 0"
4	Felix Großschartner (AUT)	CCC–Sprandi–Polkowice	+ 5"
5	Jan Polanc (SLO)	UAE Team Emirates	+ 8"
6	Franco Pellizotti (ITA)	Bahrain–Merida	+ 20"
7	Jesper Hansen (DEN)	Astana	+ 20"
8	Michal Schlegel (CZE)	CCC–Sprandi–Polkowice	+ 23"
9	Kanstantsin Sivtsov (BLR)	Bahrain–Merida	+ 23"
10	Edward Ravasi (ITA)	UAE Team Emirates	+ 29"

General classification after Stage 5
Rank	Rider	Team	Time
1	Jaime Rosón (ESP)	Caja Rural–Seguros RGA	21h 55' 17"
2	Vincenzo Nibali (ITA)	Bahrain–Merida	+ 2"
3	Jan Hirt (CZE)	CCC–Sprandi–Polkowice	+ 15"
4	Felix Großschartner (AUT)	CCC–Sprandi–Polkowice	+ 30"
5	Jan Polanc (SLO)	UAE Team Emirates	+ 45"
6	Kanstantsin Sivtsov (BLR)	Bahrain–Merida	+ 46"
7	Michal Schlegel (CZE)	CCC–Sprandi–Polkowice	+ 1' 05"
8	Jesper Hansen (DEN)	Astana	+ 1' 20"
9	James Knox (GBR)	WIGGINS	+ 1' 22"
10	Óscar Eduardo Sánchez (COL)	Bicicletas Strongman	+ 1' 27"

=== Stage 6 ===
23 April 2017 – Samobor to Zagreb, 147 km (91.3 mi)

Stage 6 result
Rank	Rider	Team	Time
1	Sacha Modolo (ITA)	UAE Team Emirates	3h 16' 52"
2	Jan Polanc (SLO)	UAE Team Emirates	+ 2"
3	Boy van Poppel (NED)	Trek–Segafredo	+ 2"
4	Vincenzo Nibali (ITA)	Bahrain–Merida	+ 2"
5	Marco Canola (ITA)	Nippo–Vini Fantini	+ 6"
6	Felix Großschartner (AUT)	CCC–Sprandi–Polkowice	+ 6"
7	Nicola Boem (ITA)	Bardiani–CSF	+ 6"
8	Daniel Auer (AUT)	Team Felbermayr–Simplon Wels	+ 6"
9	James Knox (GBR)	WIGGINS	+ 6"
10	Jan Hirt (CZE)	CCC–Sprandi–Polkowice	+ 9"

Final general classification
Rank	Rider	Team	Time
1	Vincenzo Nibali (ITA)	Bahrain–Merida	25h 12' 10"
2	Jaime Rosón (ESP)	Caja Rural–Seguros RGA	+ 8"
3	Jan Hirt (CZE)	CCC–Sprandi–Polkowice	+ 23"
4	Felix Großschartner (AUT)	CCC–Sprandi–Polkowice	+ 35"
5	Jan Polanc (SLO)	UAE Team Emirates	+ 40"
6	Kanstantsin Sivtsov (BLR)	Bahrain–Merida	+ 59"
7	Michal Schlegel (CZE)	CCC–Sprandi–Polkowice	+ 1' 23"
8	James Knox (GBR)	WIGGINS	+ 1' 27"
9	Jesper Hansen (DEN)	Astana	+ 1' 38"
10	Óscar Eduardo Sánchez (COL)	Bicicletas Strongman	+ 1' 45"

== Classification leadership table ==
In the 2017 Tour of Croatia, four different jerseys were awarded. The general classification was calculated by adding each cyclist's finishing times on each stage, and allowing time bonuses for the first three finishers at intermediate sprints (three seconds to first, two seconds to second and one second to third) and at the finish of mass-start stages; these were awarded to the first three finishers on all stages: the stage winner won a ten-second bonus, with six and four seconds for the second and third riders respectively. The leader of the classification received a red jersey; it was considered the most important of the 2017 Tour of Croatia, and the winner of the classification was considered the winner of the race.

Points for the mountains classification
Position	1	2	3	4	5	6	7	8
Points for Hors-category	20	15	10	8	6	4	3	2
Points for Category 2	6	4	2	0				
Points for Category 3	3	2	1	0				

Additionally, there was a points classification, which awarded a blue jersey. In the points classification, cyclists received points for finishing in the top 15 in a stage. For winning a stage, a rider earned 25 points, with 20 for second, 16 for third, 14 for fourth, 12 for fifth, 10 for sixth and a point fewer per place down to 1 point for 15th place. Points towards the classification could also be accrued – awarded on a 5–3–1 scale – at intermediate sprint points during each stage; these intermediate sprints also offered bonus seconds towards the general classification as noted above.

There was also a mountains classification, the leadership of which was marked by a green jersey. In the mountains classification, points towards the classification were won by reaching the top of a climb before other cyclists. Each climb was categorised as either hors, second, or third-category, with more points available for the higher-categorised climbs. The fourth and final jersey represented the classification for young riders, marked by a white jersey. This was decided the same way as the general classification, but only riders born after 1 January 1995 were eligible to be ranked in the classification. There was also a classification for teams, in which the times of the best three cyclists per team on each stage were added together; the leading team at the end of the race was the team with the lowest total time.

Classification leadership by stage
Stage	Winner	General classification	Points classification	Mountains classification	Young rider classification	Team classification
1	Sacha Modolo	Sacha Modolo	Sacha Modolo	Nikolay Trusov	Riccardo Minali	Nippo–Vini Fantini
2	Kristijan Đurasek	Kristijan Đurasek	Kristijan Đurasek	Kristijan Đurasek	Michal Schlegel	CCC–Sprandi–Polkowice
3	Nicola Ruffoni	Jaime Rosón	Eduard-Michael Grosu	Kristijan Đurasek	James Knox	CCC–Sprandi–Polkowice
4	Nicola Ruffoni	Vincenzo Nibali	Nicola Ruffoni	Jaime Rosón	James Knox	CCC–Sprandi–Polkowice
5	Jaime Rosón	Jaime Rosón	Nicola Ruffoni	Jaime Rosón	Michal Schlegel	CCC–Sprandi–Polkowice
6	Sacha Modolo	Vincenzo Nibali	Nicola Ruffoni	Jaime Rosón	Michal Schlegel	CCC–Sprandi–Polkowice
Final		Vincenzo Nibali	Nicola Ruffoni	Jaime Rosón	Michal Schlegel	CCC–Sprandi–Polkowice

== Final standings ==
Legend
Red jersey	Denotes the leader of the General classification
Blue jersey	Denotes the leader of the Points classification
Green jersey	Denotes the leader of the Mountains classification
White jersey	Denotes the leader of the Young rider classification

=== General classification ===
Result
Rank	Rider	Team	Time
1	Vincenzo Nibali (ITA)	Bahrain–Merida	25h 12' 10"
2	Jaime Rosón (ESP)	Caja Rural–Seguros RGA	+ 8"
3	Jan Hirt (CZE)	CCC–Sprandi–Polkowice	+ 23"
4	Felix Großschartner (AUT)	CCC–Sprandi–Polkowice	+ 35"
5	Jan Polanc (SLO)	UAE Team Emirates	+ 40"
6	Kanstantsin Sivtsov (BLR)	Bahrain–Merida	+ 59"
7	Michal Schlegel (CZE)	CCC–Sprandi–Polkowice	+ 1' 23"
8	James Knox (GBR)	WIGGINS	+ 1' 27"
9	Jesper Hansen (DEN)	Astana	+ 1' 38"
10	Óscar Eduardo Sánchez (COL)	Bicicletas Strongman	+ 1' 45"

=== Points classification ===
Result
Rank	Rider	Team	Points
1	Nicola Ruffoni (ITA)	Bardiani–CSF	56
2	Vincenzo Nibali (ITA)	Bahrain–Merida	55
3	Sacha Modolo (ITA)	UAE Team Emirates	51
4	Riccardo Minali (ITA)	Astana	51
5	Jaime Rosón (ESP)	Caja Rural–Seguros RGA	50
6	Eduard-Michael Grosu (ROU)	Nippo–Vini Fantini	47
7	Marco Canola (ITA)	Nippo–Vini Fantini	44
8	Giacomo Nizzolo (ITA)	Trek–Segafredo	44
9	Jan Polanc (SLO)	UAE Team Emirates	40
10	Jan Hirt (CZE)	CCC–Sprandi–Polkowice	36

=== Mountains classification ===
Result
Rank	Rider	Team	Points
1	Jaime Rosón (ESP)	Caja Rural–Seguros RGA	45
2	Vincenzo Nibali (ITA)	Bahrain–Merida	25
3	Lluís Mas (ESP)	Caja Rural–Seguros RGA	23
4	Jan Hirt (CZE)	CCC–Sprandi–Polkowice	18
5	Łukasz Owsian (POL)	CCC–Sprandi–Polkowice	17
6	Felix Großschartner (AUT)	CCC–Sprandi–Polkowice	14
7	Antonino Parrinello (ITA)	GM Europa Ovini	11
8	Oleksandr Polivoda (UKR)	Kolss Cycling Team	9
9	Jan Polanc (SLO)	UAE Team Emirates	8
10	Daniel Turek (CZE)	Israel Cycling Academy	8

=== Young rider classification ===
Result
Rank	Rider	Team	Time
1	Michal Schlegel (CZE)	CCC–Sprandi–Polkowice	25h 13' 33"
2	James Knox (GBR)	WIGGINS	+ 4"
3	Artem Nych (RUS)	Gazprom–RusVelo	+ 1' 38"
4	José Manuel Díaz (ESP)	Israel Cycling Academy	+ 2' 54"
5	Alex Aranburu (ESP)	Caja Rural–Seguros RGA	+ 9' 18"
6	Francesco Canepa (ITA)	GM Europa Ovini	+ 16' 36"
7	Michael O'Loughlin (IRL)	WIGGINS	+ 18' 09"
8	Lorenzo Rota (ITA)	Bardiani–CSF	+ 19' 27"
9	Damian Lüscher (SUI)	Roth–Akros	+ 21' 40"
10	Johannes Schinnagel (GER)	Team Felbermayr–Simplon Wels	+ 31' 58"

=== Teams classification ===
Result
Rank	Team	Time
1	CCC–Sprandi–Polkowice	75h 38' 55"
2	Bahrain–Merida	+ 3' 46"
3	Caja Rural–Seguros RGA	+ 8' 29"
4	Gazprom–RusVelo	+ 9' 01"
5	Roth–Akros	+ 10' 49"
6	Team Felbermayr–Simplon Wels	+ 11' 12"
7	Bicicletas Strongman	+ 19' 46"
8	Meridiana–Kamen	+ 21' 10"
9	Astana	+ 21' 19"
10	Kolss Cycling Team	+ 22' 36"
