= Arjen Livyns =

Belgian cyclist

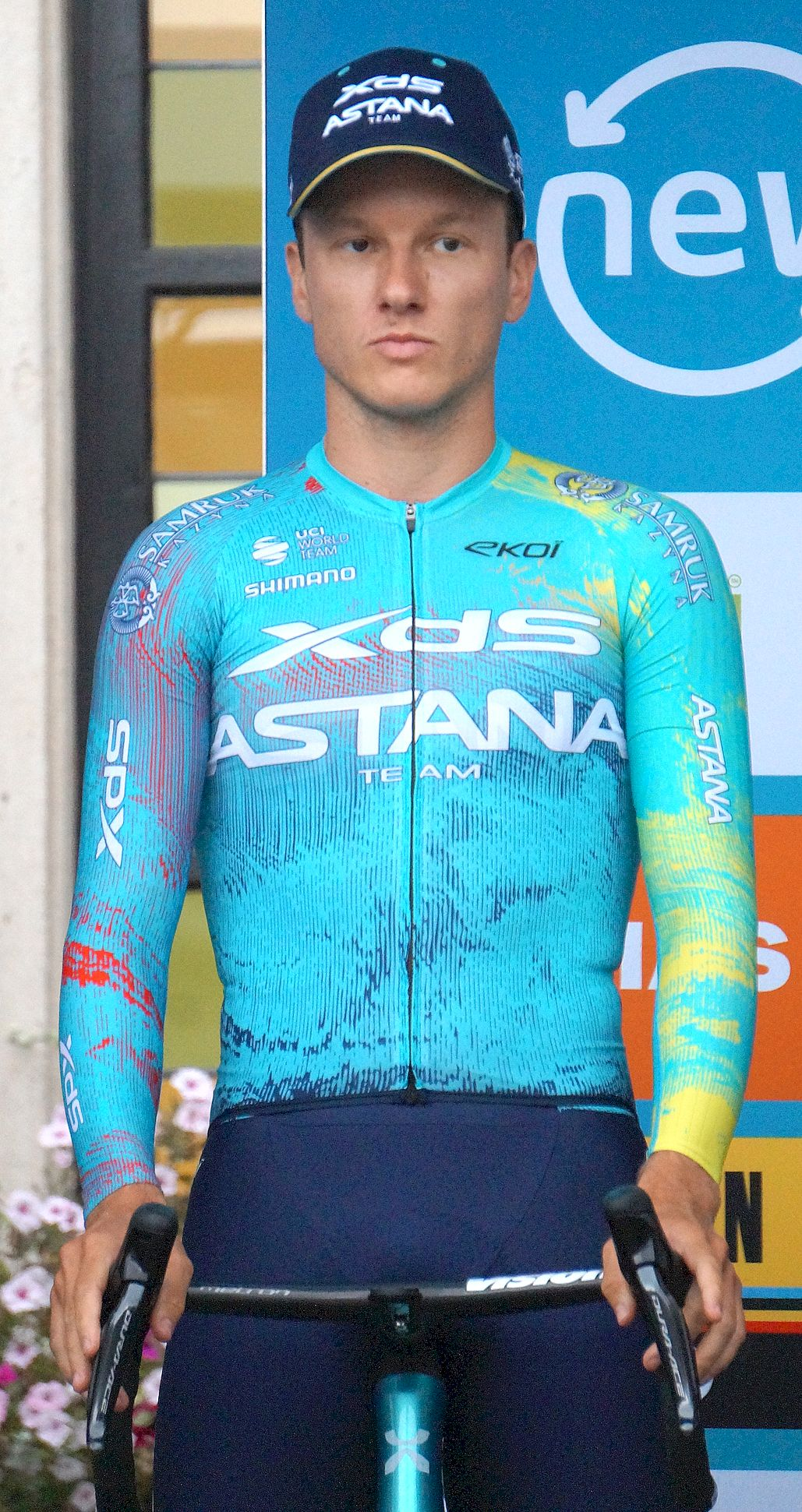
- Livyns in 2026

Personal information
- Full name: Arjen Livyns
- Born: 1 September 1994 (age 32) Waregem, Belgium
- Height: 1.70 m (5 ft 7 in)
- Weight: 58 kg (128 lb)

Cycling career
- Sport: Cycling
- Current team: Lotto–Intermarché
- Discipline: Road
- Role: Rider

Amateur teams
- 2013–2014: Prorace
- 2015–2016: VL Technics–Experza–Abutriek
- 2016: Verandas Willems (stagiaire)
- 2017: Pauwels Sauzen–Vastgoedservice
- 2017: Vérandas Willems–Crelan (stagiaire)
- 2018: BEAT Cycling Club

Professional teams
- 2018: Vérandas Willems–Crelan
- 2019: Roompot–Charles
- 2020–2022: Bingoal–Wallonie Bruxelles
- 2023–2025: Lotto–Dstny
- 2026–: XDS Astana Team

Arjen Livyns (born 1 September 1994) is a Belgian cyclist, who currently rides for UCI WorldTeam XDS Astana Team.

== Major results ==
2016
7th Grote Prijs Jef Scherens
2017
2nd Grand Prix Criquielion
3rd Antwerpse Havenpijl
4th Flèche Ardennaise
2019
7th Grand Prix de Wallonie
9th Circuit de Wallonie
2020
2nd Grand Prix de la Ville de Lillers
6th Trofeo Matteotti
2021
1st Combativity classification, Benelux Tour
5th Grand Prix La Marseillaise
2022
6th Brussels Cycling Classic
2023
7th Egmont Cycling Race
9th Tour of Leuven
2024
8th Muscat Classic
2025
4th Road race, National Road Championships
8th Dwars door Vlaanderen
