= 2018 Tirreno–Adriatico =

Cycling race

2018 UCI World Tour, race 7 of 37

Race details
- Dates: 7–13 March 2018
- Stages: 7
- Distance: 992.5 km (616.7 mi)
- Winning time: 25h 32' 56"

Results
Jersey awarded to the overall winner	Winner	Michał Kwiatkowski (POL)	(Team Sky)
	Second	Damiano Caruso (ITA)	(BMC Racing Team)
	Third	Geraint Thomas (GBR)	(Team Sky)
Jersey awarded to the points classification winner	Points	Jacopo Mosca (ITA)	(Wilier Triestina–Selle Italia)
Jersey awarded to the mountains classification winner	Mountains	Nicola Bagioli (ITA)	(Nippo–Vini Fantini–Europa Ovini)
Jersey awarded to the youth classification winner	Youth	Tiesj Benoot (BEL)	(Lotto–Soudal)
	Team	Astana	

The 2018 Tirreno–Adriatico NAMEDSPORT was a road cycling stage race that took place between 7 and 13 March 2018 in Italy. It was the 53rd edition of the Tirreno–Adriatico and the seventh event of the 2018 UCI World Tour.

A Polish rider won the race for the first time, as Team Sky's Michał Kwiatkowski took the overall victory; Kwiatkowski took the race lead after gaining bonus seconds on the fifth stage, and maintained the lead to the end of the race. Kwiatkowski finished 24 seconds clear of Damiano Caruso (BMC Racing Team), while the podium was completed by another Team Sky rider, Geraint Thomas, a further 8 seconds behind Caruso. In the other classifications, Jacopo Mosca (Wilier Triestina–Selle Italia) won the orange jersey as points classification winner, while Nicola Bagioli (Nippo–Vini Fantini–Europa Ovini) won the mountains classification and its accompanying green jersey. The young rider classification and the white jersey was won by Lotto–Soudal's Tiesj Benoot, in fourth place overall, while the teams classification was won by Astana.

== Teams ==
As Tirreno–Adriatico was a UCI World Tour event, all eighteen UCI WorldTeams were invited automatically and obliged to enter a team in the race. Four UCI Professional Continental teams competed, completing the 22-team peloton.

UCI WorldTeams

- AG2R La Mondiale
- Astana
- Bahrain–Merida
- BMC Racing Team
- Bora–Hansgrohe
- Team Dimension Data
- EF Education First–Drapac p/b Cannondale
- Team Katusha–Alpecin
- LottoNL–Jumbo
- Lotto–Soudal
- Mitchelton–Scott
- Movistar Team
- Quick-Step Floors
- Team Sky
- Team Sunweb
- Trek–Segafredo
- UAE Team Emirates
- Groupama–FDJ

UCI Professional Continental teams

- Gazprom–RusVelo
- Israel Cycling Academy
- Nippo–Vini Fantini–Europa Ovini
- Wilier Triestina–Selle Italia

== Route ==
The route of the 2018 Tirreno–Adriatico was announced on 12 January 2018. As part of the route, a stage finish in Filottrano was scheduled in honour of Michele Scarponi, who died the previous April.

Stage schedule
Stage	Date	Route	Distance	Type	Winner
1	7 March	Lido di Camaiore to Lido di Camaiore	21.5 km (13 mi)	Team time trial	BMC Racing Team
2	8 March	Camaiore to Follonica	172 km (107 mi)	Flat stage	Marcel Kittel (GER)
3	9 March	Follonica to Trevi	239 km (149 mi)	Hilly stage	Primož Roglič (SLO)
4	10 March	Foligno to Sarnano–Sassotetto	219 km (136 mi)	Mountain stage	Mikel Landa (ESP)
5	11 March	Castelraimondo to Filottrano	178 km (111 mi)	Hilly stage	Adam Yates (GBR)
6	12 March	Numana to Fano	153 km (95 mi)	Hilly stage	Marcel Kittel (GER)
7	13 March	San Benedetto del Tronto to San Benedetto del Tronto	10 km (6 mi)	Individual time trial	Rohan Dennis (AUS)

== Stages ==
=== Stage 1 ===
7 March 2018 — Lido di Camaiore to Lido di Camaiore, 21.5 km (13 mi), team time trial (TTT)

Result of Stage 1
Rank	Team	Time
1	BMC Racing Team	22' 19"
2	Mitchelton–Scott	+ 4"
3	Team Sky	+ 9"
4	Quick-Step Floors	+ 15"
5	Team Sunweb	+ 25"
6	Team Katusha–Alpecin	+ 28"
7	Bora–Hansgrohe	+ 30"
8	Trek–Segafredo	+ 39"
9	UAE Team Emirates	+ 45"
10	EF Education First–Drapac p/b Cannondale	+ 45"

General classification after Stage 1
Rank	Rider	Team	Time
1	Damiano Caruso (ITA)	BMC Racing Team	22' 19"
2	Rohan Dennis (AUS)	BMC Racing Team	+ 0"
3	Patrick Bevin (NZL)	BMC Racing Team	+ 0"
4	Greg Van Avermaet (BEL)	BMC Racing Team	+ 0"
5	Luke Durbridge (AUS)	Mitchelton–Scott	+ 4"
6	Daryl Impey (RSA)	Mitchelton–Scott	+ 4"
7	Adam Yates (GBR)	Mitchelton–Scott	+ 4"
8	Michael Hepburn (AUS)	Mitchelton–Scott	+ 4"
9	Geraint Thomas (GBR)	Team Sky	+ 9"
10	Jonathan Castroviejo (ESP)	Team Sky	+ 9"

=== Stage 2 ===
8 March 2018 – Camaiore to Follonica, 172 km (107 mi)

Result of Stage 2
Rank	Rider	Team	Time
1	Marcel Kittel (GER)	Team Katusha–Alpecin	4h 12' 24"
2	Peter Sagan (SVK)	Bora–Hansgrohe	+ 0"
3	Giacomo Nizzolo (ITA)	Trek–Segafredo	+ 0"
4	Michał Kwiatkowski (POL)	Team Sky	+ 0"
5	Patrick Bevin (NZL)	BMC Racing Team	+ 0"
6	Jakub Mareczko (ITA)	Wilier Triestina–Selle Italia	+ 0"
7	Fernando Gaviria (COL)	Quick-Step Floors	+ 0"
8	Danny van Poppel (NED)	LottoNL–Jumbo	+ 0"
9	Eduard-Michael Grosu (ROU)	Nippo–Vini Fantini–Europa Ovini	+ 0"
10	Simone Consonni (ITA)	UAE Team Emirates	+ 0"

General classification after Stage 2
Rank	Rider	Team	Time
1	Patrick Bevin (NZL)	BMC Racing Team	4h 34' 43"
2	Damiano Caruso (ITA)	BMC Racing Team	+ 0"
3	Greg Van Avermaet (BEL)	BMC Racing Team	+ 0"
4	Rohan Dennis (AUS)	BMC Racing Team	+ 0"
5	Daryl Impey (RSA)	Mitchelton–Scott	+ 4"
6	Michał Kwiatkowski (POL)	Team Sky	+ 9"
7	Geraint Thomas (GBR)	Team Sky	+ 9"
8	Salvatore Puccio (ITA)	Team Sky	+ 9"
9	Chris Froome (GBR)	Team Sky	+ 9"
10	Jonathan Castroviejo (ESP)	Team Sky	+ 9"

=== Stage 3 ===
9 March 2018 – Follonica to Trevi, 239 km (149 mi)

Result of Stage 3
Rank	Rider	Team	Time
1	Primož Roglič (SLO)	LottoNL–Jumbo	6h 17' 23"
2	Adam Yates (GBR)	Mitchelton–Scott	+ 3"
3	Tiesj Benoot (BEL)	Lotto–Soudal	+ 6"
4	Geraint Thomas (GBR)	Team Sky	+ 7"
5	Rigoberto Urán (COL)	EF Education First–Drapac p/b Cannondale	+ 10"
6	Mikel Landa (ESP)	Movistar Team	+ 10"
7	Gianni Moscon (ITA)	Team Sky	+ 10"
8	Romain Bardet (FRA)	AG2R La Mondiale	+ 10"
9	Wilco Kelderman (NED)	Team Sunweb	+ 10"
10	Bob Jungels (LUX)	Quick-Step Floors	+ 10"

General classification after Stage 3
Rank	Rider	Team	Time
1	Geraint Thomas (GBR)	Team Sky	10h 52' 22"
2	Greg Van Avermaet (BEL)	BMC Racing Team	+ 0"
3	Chris Froome (GBR)	Team Sky	+ 3"
4	Damiano Caruso (ITA)	BMC Racing Team	+ 8"
5	Michał Kwiatkowski (POL)	Team Sky	+ 9"
6	Bob Jungels (LUX)	Quick-Step Floors	+ 9"
7	Wilco Kelderman (NED)	Team Sunweb	+ 19"
8	Davide Formolo (ITA)	Bora–Hansgrohe	+ 30"
9	Tom Dumoulin (NED)	Team Sunweb	+ 33"
10	Rigoberto Urán (COL)	EF Education First–Drapac p/b Cannondale	+ 39"

=== Stage 4 ===
10 March 2018 — Foligno to Sarnano–Sassotetto, 219 km (136 mi)

Result of Stage 4
Rank	Rider	Team	Time
1	Mikel Landa (ESP)	Movistar Team	6h 22' 13"
2	Rafał Majka (POL)	Bora–Hansgrohe	+ 0"
3	George Bennett (NZL)	LottoNL–Jumbo	+ 0"
4	Fabio Aru (ITA)	UAE Team Emirates	+ 6"
5	Ben Hermans (BEL)	Israel Cycling Academy	+ 6"
6	Tiesj Benoot (BEL)	Lotto–Soudal	+ 6"
7	Romain Bardet (FRA)	AG2R La Mondiale	+ 6"
8	Wilco Kelderman (NED)	Team Sunweb	+ 6"
9	Adam Yates (GBR)	Mitchelton–Scott	+ 6"
10	Rigoberto Urán (COL)	EF Education First–Drapac p/b Cannondale	+ 6"

General classification after Stage 4
Rank	Rider	Team	Time
1	Damiano Caruso (ITA)	BMC Racing Team	17h 14' 49"
2	Michał Kwiatkowski (POL)	Team Sky	+ 1"
3	Wilco Kelderman (NED)	Team Sunweb	+ 11"
4	Mikel Landa (ESP)	Movistar Team	+ 20"
5	Geraint Thomas (GBR)	Team Sky	+ 26"
6	Rigoberto Urán (COL)	EF Education First–Drapac p/b Cannondale	+ 31"
7	George Bennett (NZL)	LottoNL–Jumbo	+ 33"
8	Davide Formolo (ITA)	Bora–Hansgrohe	+ 34"
9	Tiesj Benoot (BEL)	Lotto–Soudal	+ 36"
10	Domenico Pozzovivo (ITA)	Bahrain–Merida	+ 41"

=== Stage 5 ===
11 March 2018 — Castelraimondo to Filottrano, 178 km (111 mi)

Result of Stage 5
Rank	Rider	Team	Time
1	Adam Yates (GBR)	Mitchelton–Scott	4h 16' 35"
2	Peter Sagan (SVK)	Bora–Hansgrohe	+ 7"
3	Michał Kwiatkowski (POL)	Team Sky	+ 7"
4	Tiesj Benoot (BEL)	Lotto–Soudal	+ 7"
5	Rigoberto Urán (COL)	EF Education First–Drapac p/b Cannondale	+ 7"
6	Geraint Thomas (GBR)	Team Sky	+ 7"
7	Mikel Landa (ESP)	Movistar Team	+ 7"
8	Jaime Rosón (ESP)	Movistar Team	+ 7"
9	Romain Bardet (FRA)	AG2R La Mondiale	+ 7"
10	Damiano Caruso (ITA)	BMC Racing Team	+ 7"

General classification after Stage 5
Rank	Rider	Team	Time
1	Michał Kwiatkowski (POL)	Team Sky	21h 31' 28"
2	Damiano Caruso (ITA)	BMC Racing Team	+ 3"
3	Mikel Landa (ESP)	Movistar Team	+ 23"
4	Geraint Thomas (GBR)	Team Sky	+ 29"
5	Rigoberto Urán (COL)	EF Education First–Drapac p/b Cannondale	+ 34"
6	Adam Yates (GBR)	Mitchelton–Scott	+ 36"
7	Davide Formolo (ITA)	Bora–Hansgrohe	+ 37"
8	Tiesj Benoot (BEL)	Lotto–Soudal	+ 39"
9	George Bennett (NZL)	LottoNL–Jumbo	+ 41"
10	Jaime Rosón (ESP)	Movistar Team	+ 47"

=== Stage 6 ===
12 March 2018 — Numana to Fano, 153 km (95 mi)

Result of Stage 6
Rank	Rider	Team	Time
1	Marcel Kittel (GER)	Team Katusha–Alpecin	3h 49' 54"
2	Peter Sagan (SVK)	Bora–Hansgrohe	+ 0"
3	Maximiliano Richeze (ARG)	Quick-Step Floors	+ 0"
4	Sacha Modolo (ITA)	EF Education First–Drapac p/b Cannondale	+ 0"
5	Zdeněk Štybar (CZE)	Quick-Step Floors	+ 0"
6	Jens Debusschere (BEL)	Lotto–Soudal	+ 0"
7	Marco Canola (ITA)	Nippo–Vini Fantini–Europa Ovini	+ 0"
8	Simone Consonni (ITA)	UAE Team Emirates	+ 0"
9	Eduard-Michael Grosu (ROM)	Nippo–Vini Fantini–Europa Ovini	+ 0"
10	Rick Zabel (GER)	Team Katusha–Alpecin	+ 0"

General classification after Stage 6
Rank	Rider	Team	Time
1	Michał Kwiatkowski (POL)	Team Sky	25h 21' 22"
2	Damiano Caruso (ITA)	BMC Racing Team	+ 3"
3	Mikel Landa (ESP)	Movistar Team	+ 23"
4	Geraint Thomas (GBR)	Team Sky	+ 29"
5	Rigoberto Urán (COL)	EF Education First–Drapac p/b Cannondale	+ 34"
6	Adam Yates (GBR)	Mitchelton–Scott	+ 36"
7	Davide Formolo (ITA)	Bora–Hansgrohe	+ 37"
8	Tiesj Benoot (BEL)	Lotto–Soudal	+ 39"
9	George Bennett (NZL)	LottoNL–Jumbo	+ 41"
10	Jaime Rosón (ESP)	Movistar Team	+ 47"

=== Stage 7 ===
13 March 2018 — San Benedetto del Tronto to San Benedetto del Tronto, 10 km (6 mi), individual time trial (ITT)

Result of Stage 7
Rank	Rider	Team	Time
1	Rohan Dennis (AUS)	BMC Racing Team	11' 14"
2	Jos van Emden (NED)	LottoNL–Jumbo	+ 4"
3	Jonathan Castroviejo (ESP)	Team Sky	+ 8"
4	Mads Pedersen (DEN)	Trek–Segafredo	+ 8"
5	Gianni Moscon (ITA)	Team Sky	+ 12"
6	Michael Hepburn (AUS)	Mitchelton–Scott	+ 13"
7	Jack Bauer (NZL)	Mitchelton–Scott	+ 13"
8	Luke Durbridge (AUS)	Mitchelton–Scott	+ 17"
9	Primož Roglič (SLO)	LottoNL–Jumbo	+ 18"
10	Vasil Kiryienka (BLR)	Team Sky	+ 18"

Final general classification
Rank	Rider	Team	Time
1	Michał Kwiatkowski (POL)	Team Sky	25h 32' 56"
2	Damiano Caruso (ITA)	BMC Racing Team	+ 24"
3	Geraint Thomas (GBR)	Team Sky	+ 32"
4	Tiesj Benoot (BEL)	Lotto–Soudal	+ 1' 06"
5	Adam Yates (GBR)	Mitchelton–Scott	+ 1' 10"
6	Mikel Landa (ESP)	Movistar Team	+ 1' 13"
7	Davide Formolo (ITA)	Bora–Hansgrohe	+ 1' 15"
8	Jaime Rosón (ESP)	Movistar Team	+ 1' 15"
9	George Bennett (NZL)	LottoNL–Jumbo	+ 1' 16"
10	Rigoberto Urán (COL)	EF Education First–Drapac p/b Cannondale	+ 1' 22"

== Classification leadership table ==
In the 2018 Tirreno–Adriatico, four jerseys were awarded. The general classification was calculated by adding each cyclist's finishing times on each stage. Time bonuses were awarded to the first three finishers on all stages except for the time trials: the stage winner won a ten-second bonus, with six and four seconds for the second and third riders respectively. Bonus seconds were also awarded to the first three riders at intermediate sprints; three seconds for the winner of the sprint, two seconds for the rider in second and one second for the rider in third. The leader of the general classification received a blue jersey. This classification was considered the most important of the 2018 Tirreno–Adriatico, and the winner of the classification was considered the winner of the race.

Points for stage victory
Position	1	2	3	4	5	6	7	8	9	10
Points awarded	12	10	8	7	6	5	4	3	2	1

The second classification was the points classification. Riders were awarded points for finishing in the top ten in a stage. Unlike in the points classification in the Tour de France, the winners of all stages – with the exception of the team time trial, which awarded no points towards the classification – were awarded the same number of points. Points were also won in intermediate sprints; five points for crossing the sprint line first, three points for second place, two for third and one for fourth. The leader of the points classification was awarded an orange jersey, a change from the red jersey awarded in 2017.

Points for the mountains classification
Position	1	2	3	4	5	6	7
Points for Superior	15	10	7	5	3	2	1
Points for single category	5	3	2	1	0		

There was also a mountains classification, for which points were awarded for reaching the top of a climb before other riders. Each of the sixteen climbs was categorised as either Superior-, or single-category, with more points available for the more difficult, Superior-category climb to Sassotetto. For this climb, the top seven riders earned points; on the other climbs, only the top four riders earned points. The leadership of the mountains classification was marked by a green jersey.

The fourth jersey represented the young rider classification, marked by a white jersey. Only riders born after 1 January 1993 were eligible; the young rider best placed in the general classification was the leader of the young rider classification. There was also a classification for teams, in which the times of the best three cyclists in a team on each stage were added together; the leading team at the end of the race was the team with the lowest cumulative time.

Stage	Winner	General classification	Points classification	Mountains classification	Young rider classification	Teams classification
1	BMC Racing Team	Damiano Caruso	Not awarded	Not awarded	Fernando Gaviria	BMC Racing Team
2	Marcel Kittel	Patrick Bevin	Marcel Kittel	Nicola Bagioli	Fernando Gaviria	BMC Racing Team
3	Primož Roglič	Geraint Thomas	Jacopo Mosca	Nicola Bagioli	Jaime Rosón	Team Sky
4	Mikel Landa	Damiano Caruso	Jacopo Mosca	Nicola Bagioli	Tiesj Benoot	Team Sky
5	Adam Yates	Michał Kwiatkowski	Jacopo Mosca	Nicola Bagioli	Tiesj Benoot	Astana
6	Marcel Kittel	Michał Kwiatkowski	Jacopo Mosca	Nicola Bagioli	Tiesj Benoot	Astana
7	Rohan Dennis	Michał Kwiatkowski	Jacopo Mosca	Nicola Bagioli	Tiesj Benoot	Astana
Final		Michał Kwiatkowski	Jacopo Mosca	Nicola Bagioli	Tiesj Benoot	Astana
