= 2018 Volta ao Algarve =

2018 UCI Europe Tour

Race details
- Dates: 14–18 February 2018
- Stages: 5
- Distance: 773.5 km (480.6 mi)
- Winning time: 18h 54' 11"

Results
	Winner	Michał Kwiatkowski (POL)
	Second	Geraint Thomas (GBR)
	Third	Tejay van Garderen (USA)
	Points	Michał Kwiatkowski (POL)
	Mountains	Benjamin King (USA)
	Youth	Sam Oomen (NED)
	Team	Team Sky

The 2018 Volta ao Algarve was a road cycling stage race that took place in the Algarve region of Portugal between 14 and 18 February 2018. It was the 44th edition of the Volta ao Algarve and was rated as a 2.HC event as part of the UCI Europe Tour.

== Teams ==
Twenty-five teams participated in the race: 13 UCI WorldTeams, 3 UCI Professional Continental teams and 9 UCI Continental teams, forming a field of 173 riders. Each team had a maximum of seven riders:

UCI WorldTeams

- BMC Racing Team
- Bora–Hansgrohe
- Lotto–Soudal
- LottoNL–Jumbo
- Quick-Step Floors
- Team Dimension Data
- Team Katusha–Alpecin
- Team Sunweb
- UAE Team Emirates
- Trek–Segafredo
- Team Sky
- Movistar Team
- Groupama–FDJ

UCI Professional teams

- Cofidis
- Caja Rural–Seguros RGA
- Wanty–Groupe Gobert

UCI Continental teams

- Efapel
- Liberty Seguros–Carglass
- Aviludo–Louletano
- Vito–Feirense–BlackJack
- W52 / FC Porto
- LA Alumínios
- Miranda–Mortágua
- Rádio Popular–Boavista
- Sporting / Tavira

== Route ==
Stage characteristics and winners
Stage	Date	Course	Distance	Type	Stage winner
1	14 February	Albufeira to Lagos	192.6 km (119.7 mi)	Flat stage	Dylan Groenewegen (NED)
2	15 February	Sagres (Vila do Bispo) to Fóia (mountain)	187.9 km (116.8 mi)	Mountain stage	Michał Kwiatkowski (POL)
3	16 February	Lagoa to Lagoa	20.3 km (12.6 mi)	Individual time trial	Geraint Thomas (GBR)
4	17 February	Almodôvar to Tavira	199.2 km (123.8 mi)	Flat stage	Dylan Groenewegen (NED)
5	18 February	Faro to Alto do Malhão	173.5 km (107.8 mi)	Medium mountain stage	Michał Kwiatkowski (POL)

== Stages ==
=== Stage 1 ===
Stage 1 result

Rank	Rider	Team	Time
1	Dylan Groenewegen (NED)	LottoNL–Jumbo	4h 47' 58"
2	Arnaud Démare (FRA)	FDJ	s.t.
3	Hugo Hofstetter (FRA)	Cofidis	s.t.
4	Timothy Dupont (BEL)	Wanty–Groupe Gobert	s.t.
5	Jürgen Roelandts (BEL)	BMC Racing Team	s.t.
6	John Degenkolb (GER)	Trek–Segafredo	s.t.
7	Jens Keukeleire (BEL)	Lotto–Soudal	s.t.
8	Matteo Pelucchi (ITA)	Wanty–Groupe Gobert	s.t.
9	Yves Lampaert (BEL)	Quick-Step Floors	s.t.
10	Luís Mendonça (POR)	Aviludo–Louletano	s.t.

General classification after Stage 1

Rank	Rider	Team	Time
1	Dylan Groenewegen (NED)	LottoNL–Jumbo	4h 47' 58"
2	Arnaud Démare (FRA)	FDJ	s.t.
3	Hugo Hofstetter (FRA)	Cofidis	s.t.
4	Timothy Dupont (BEL)	Wanty–Groupe Gobert	s.t.
5	Jürgen Roelandts (BEL)	BMC Racing Team	s.t.
6	John Degenkolb (GER)	Trek–Segafredo	s.t.
7	Jens Keukeleire (BEL)	Lotto–Soudal	s.t.
8	Matteo Pelucchi (ITA)	Wanty–Groupe Gobert	s.t.
9	Yves Lampaert (BEL)	Quick-Step Floors	s.t.
10	Luís Mendonça (POR)	Aviludo–Louletano	s.t.

=== Stage 2 ===
Stage 2 result

Rank	Rider	Team	Time
1	Michał Kwiatkowski (POL)	Team Sky	4h 49' 51"
2	Bauke Mollema (NED)	Trek–Segafredo	s.t.
3	Geraint Thomas (GBR)	Team Sky	s.t.
4	Dan Martin (IRL)	UAE Team Emirates	s.t.
DSQ	~~Jaime Rosón (ESP)~~	~~Movistar Team~~	~~s.t.~~
6	Patrick Konrad (AUT)	Bora–Hansgrohe	+ 3"
7	Bob Jungels (LUX)	Quick-Step Floors	s.t.
8	Pieter Serry (BEL)	Quick-Step Floors	s.t.
9	Vicente García de Mateos (ESP)	Aviludo–Louletano	s.t.
10	Richie Porte (AUS)	BMC Racing Team	s.t.

General classification after Stage 2

Rank	Rider	Team	Time
1	Geraint Thomas (GBR)	Team Sky	9h 37' 49"
DSQ	~~Jaime Rosón (ESP)~~	~~Movistar Team~~	~~s.t.~~
3	Michał Kwiatkowski (POL)	Team Sky	s.t.
4	Dan Martin (IRL)	UAE Team Emirates	s.t.
5	Bauke Mollema (NED)	Trek–Segafredo	s.t.
6	Patrick Konrad (AUT)	Bora–Hansgrohe	+ 3"
7	Bob Jungels (LUX)	Quick-Step Floors	s.t.
8	Pieter Serry (BEL)	Quick-Step Floors	s.t.
9	Vicente García de Mateos (ESP)	Aviludo–Louletano	s.t.
10	Louis Meintjes (RSA)	Team Dimension Data	s.t.

=== Stage 3 ===
Stage 3 result

Rank	Rider	Team	Time
1	Geraint Thomas (GBR)	Team Sky	24' 09"
2	Victor Campenaerts (BEL)	Lotto–Soudal	+ 11"
3	Stefan Küng (SUI)	BMC Racing Team	+ 19"
4	Michał Kwiatkowski (POL)	Team Sky	+ 22"
5	Nelson Oliveira (POR)	Movistar Team	s.t.
6	Tony Martin (GER)	Team Katusha–Alpecin	+ 27"
7	Tejay van Garderen (USA)	BMC Racing Team	+ 47"
8	Bob Jungels (LUX)	Quick-Step Floors	+ 49"
9	Vasil Kiryienka (BLR)	Team Sky	+ 50"
10	Łukasz Wiśniowski (POL)	Team Sky	+ 51"

General classification after Stage 3

Rank	Rider	Team	Time
1	Geraint Thomas (GBR)	Team Sky	10h 01' 58"
2	Michał Kwiatkowski (POL)	Team Sky	+ 22"
3	Nelson Oliveira (POR)	Movistar Team	+ 32"
4	Bob Jungels (LUX)	Quick-Step Floors	+ 52"
5	Tejay van Garderen (USA)	BMC Racing Team	+ 53"
6	Bauke Mollema (NED)	Trek–Segafredo	+ 1' 01"
DSQ	~~Jaime Rosón (ESP)~~	~~Movistar Team~~	~~+ 1' 18"~~
8	Maximilian Schachmann (GER)	Quick-Step Floors	+ 1' 19"
9	Felix Großschartner (AUT)	Bora–Hansgrohe	+ 1' 20"
10	Vasil Kiryienka (BLR)	Team Sky	+ 1' 24"

=== Stage 4 ===
Stage 4 result

Rank	Rider	Team	Time
1	Dylan Groenewegen (NED)	LottoNL–Jumbo	4h 33' 49"
2	Matteo Pelucchi (ITA)	Bora–Hansgrohe	s.t.
3	John Degenkolb (GER)	Trek–Segafredo	s.t.
4	Florian Sénéchal (FRA)	Quick-Step Floors	s.t.
5	Jürgen Roelandts (BEL)	BMC Racing Team	s.t.
6	Timothy Dupont (BEL)	Wanty–Groupe Gobert	s.t.
7	Hugo Hofstetter (FRA)	Cofidis	s.t.
8	Jasper De Buyst (BEL)	Lotto–Soudal	s.t.
9	Loïc Vliegen (BEL)	BMC Racing Team	s.t.
10	Michał Kwiatkowski (POL)	Team Sky	s.t.

General classification after Stage 4

Rank	Rider	Team	Time
1	Geraint Thomas (GBR)	Team Sky	14h 35' 50"
2	Michał Kwiatkowski (POL)	Team Sky	+ 19"
3	Nelson Oliveira (POR)	Movistar Team	+ 32"
4	Bob Jungels (LUX)	Quick-Step Floors	+ 52"
5	Tejay van Garderen (USA)	BMC Racing Team	+ 53"
6	Bauke Mollema (NED)	Trek–Segafredo	+ 1' 01"
DSQ	~~Jaime Rosón (ESP)~~	~~Movistar Team~~	~~+ 1' 18"~~
8	Maximilian Schachmann (GER)	Quick-Step Floors	+ 1' 19"
9	Felix Großschartner (AUT)	Bora–Hansgrohe	+ 1' 20"
10	Vasil Kiryienka (BLR)	Team Sky	+ 1' 24"

=== Stage 5 ===
Stage 5 result

Rank	Rider	Team	Time
1	Michał Kwiatkowski (POL)	Team Sky	4h 18' 02"
2	Ruben Guerreiro (POR)	Trek–Segafredo	+ 4"
3	Serge Pauwels (BEL)	Team Dimension Data	+ 8"
4	Stefan Küng (SUI)	BMC Racing Team	+ 13"
5	Cesare Benedetti (ITA)	Bora–Hansgrohe	+ 15"
6	Dion Smith (NZL)	Wanty–Groupe Gobert	+ 17"
7	Simon Geschke (GER)	Team Sunweb	s.t.
8	Julen Amezqueta (ESP)	Caja Rural–Seguros RGA	+ 23"
9	Ben Swift (GBR)	UAE Team Emirates	+ 29"
10	Frederik Backaert (BEL)	Wanty–Groupe Gobert	+ 35"

General classification after Stage 5

Rank	Rider	Team	Time
1	Michał Kwiatkowski (POL)	Team Sky	18h 54' 11"
2	Geraint Thomas (GBR)	Team Sky	+ 1' 31"
3	Tejay van Garderen (USA)	BMC Racing Team	+ 2' 16"
4	Bauke Mollema (NED)	Trek–Segafredo	+ 2' 22"
5	Bob Jungels (LUX)	Quick-Step Floors	+ 2' 33"
DSQ	~~Jaime Rosón (ESP)~~	~~Movistar Team~~	~~+ 2' 49"~~
7	Maximilian Schachmann (GER)	Quick-Step Floors	+ 2' 50"
8	Serge Pauwels (BEL)	Team Dimension Data	s.t.
9	Felix Großschartner (AUT)	Bora–Hansgrohe	+ 2' 51"
10	Nelson Oliveira (POR)	Movistar Team	+ 2' 54"

== Classification leadership table ==
In the 2018 Volta ao Algarve, four different jerseys were awarded. For the general classification, calculated by adding each cyclist's finishing times on each stage, and allowing time bonuses for the first three finishers at intermediate sprints and at the finish of mass-start stages, the leader received a yellow jersey. This classification was considered the most important of the 2018 Volta ao Algarve, and the winner of the classification was considered the winner of the race.

Additionally, there was a points classification, which awarded a red jersey. In the points classification, cyclists received points for finishing in the top 10 in a mass-start stage. For winning a stage, a rider earned 25 points, with 20 for second, 16 for third, 13 for fourth, 10 for fifth, 8 for sixth, 6 for seventh, 4 for eighth, 2 for ninth and 1 for tenth place. Points towards the classification could also be accrued at intermediate sprint points during each stage; these intermediate sprints also offered bonus seconds towards the general classification. There was also a mountains classification, the leadership of which was marked by a blue jersey. In the mountains classification, points were won by reaching the top of a climb before other cyclists, with more points available for the higher-categorised climbs.

The fourth jersey represented the young rider classification, marked by a white jersey. This was decided in the same way as the general classification, but only riders born after 1 January 1995 were eligible to be ranked in the classification. There was also a classification for teams, in which the times of the best three cyclists per team on each stage were added together; the leading team at the end of the race was the team with the lowest total time.

Étape	Vainqueur	General classification	Mountains classification	Points classification	Young rider classification	Team classification
1	Dylan Groenewegen	Dylan Groenewegen	João Rodrigues	Dylan Groenewegen	Sam Oomen	Quick-Step Floors
2	Michał Kwiatkowski	Geraint Thomas	Benjamin King	Michał Kwiatkowski	Sam Oomen	Quick-Step Floors
3	Geraint Thomas	Geraint Thomas	Benjamin King	Michał Kwiatkowski	Sam Oomen	Team Sky
4	Dylan Groenewegen					
5	Michał Kwiatkowski					
Final						
