= Jaime Rosón =

Spanish cyclist

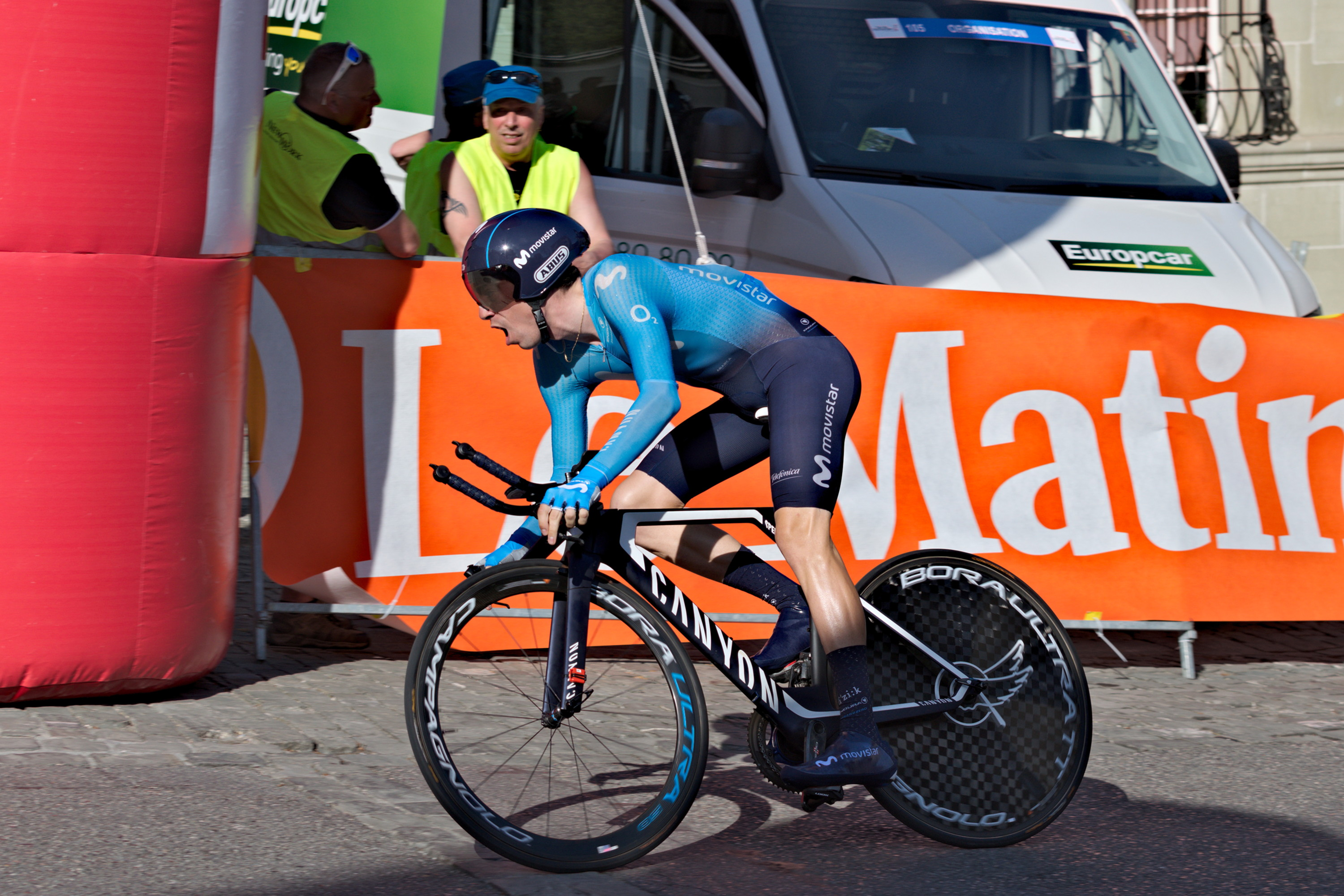

Personal information
- Full name: Jaime Rosón García
- Born: 13 January 1993 (age 33) Zamora, Spain
- Height: 1.79 m (5 ft 10 in)
- Weight: 62 kg (137 lb)

Cycling career
- Sport: Cycling
- Current team: Suspended
- Discipline: Road
- Role: Rider

Professional teams
- 2015: Team Ecuador
- 2015: Caja Rural–Seguros RGA (stagiaire)
- 2016–2017: Caja Rural–Seguros RGA
- 2018: Movistar Team

Jaime Rosón García (born 13 January 1993 in Madrid) is a Spanish road cyclist, suspended from the sport following an adverse analytical finding in his biological passport. He was named in the startlist for the 2016 Vuelta a España.

== Career achievements ==
=== Major results ===
2015
1st Road race, National Under-23 Road Championships
2016
5th Overall Vuelta a Castilla y León
9th Overall Tour of Turkey

1st Stage 6

Combativity award Stage 17 Vuelta a España
2017
2nd Overall Tour of Croatia

1st Mountains classification
1st Stage 5

2nd Overall Vuelta a Castilla y León
3rd Overall Settimana Internazionale Coppi e Bartali
5th Overall Vuelta a Burgos
2018
1st Overall Vuelta a Aragón
4th Overall Vuelta Ciclista Comunidad de Madrid

1st Mountains classification

6th Overall Volta ao Algarve
8th Overall Tirreno–Adriatico

=== Grand Tour general classification results timeline ===
Grand Tour	2016	2017
Giro d'Italia	—	—
Tour de France	—	—
Vuelta a España	73	26

Legend
—	Did not compete
DNF	Did not finish
