= Imerio Cima =

Italian cyclist (born 1997)

Personal information
- Full name: Imerio Cima
- Born: 29 October 1997 (age 28) Brescia, Italy

Cycling career
- Sport: Cycling
- Current team: Gazprom–RusVelo
- Discipline: Road
- Role: Rider
- Rider type: Sprinter

Amateur team
- 2016–2017: Viris Maserati Sisal Matchpoint

Professional teams
- 2018–2019: Nippo–Vini Fantini–Europa Ovini
- 2020–: Gazprom–RusVelo

Imerio Cima (born 29 October 1997) is an Italian cyclist, who currently rides for UCI ProTeam Gazprom–RusVelo. His older brother Damiano Cima is also a cyclist, and is also part of the Gazprom–RusVelo squad.

== Major results ==
2017
1st Circuito del Porto
4th ZLM Tour
7th Road race, UEC European Under-23 Road Championships
2018
9th Overall Tour of Taihu Lake

1st Young rider classification

2019
3rd Coppa Bernocchi
6th Overall Tour of Taihu Lake

1st Young rider classification

7th Grand Prix de Fourmies
2020
7th Paris–Chauny
10th Giro della Toscana
