= Christophe Noppe =

Belgian cyclist

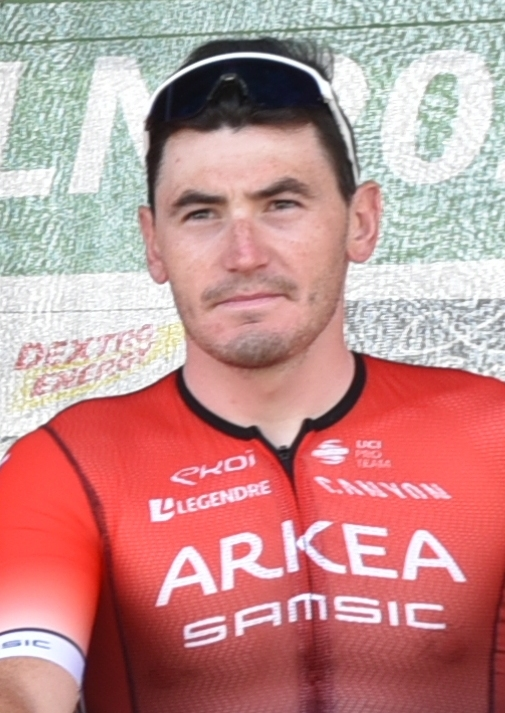
- Noppe in 2022.

Personal information
- Full name: Christophe Noppe
- Born: November 29, 1994 (age 31) Ypres, Belgium
- Height: 1.76 m (5 ft 9 in)
- Weight: 73 kg (161 lb)

Cycling career
- Sport: Cycling
- Discipline: Road
- Role: Rider

Amateur teams
- 2012: DJ–Matic Kortrijk
- 2013: Morgan Blue
- 2014–2016: EFC–Omega Pharma–Quick-Step

Professional teams
- 2017–2019: Sport Vlaanderen–Baloise
- 2020–2022: Arkéa–Samsic
- 2023–2024: Cofidis

Christophe Noppe (born 29 November 1994 in Oudenaarde) is a Belgian cyclist, who last rode for UCI WorldTeam Cofidis.

== Major results ==
2014
9th Omloop van het Waasland
2015
7th Kattekoers
2016
3rd Rund um den Finanzplatz Eschborn-Frankfurt U23
7th Paris–Troyes
8th Grand Prix de la ville de Pérenchies
2017
1st De Kustpijl
4th Circuit de Wallonie
6th Grand Prix de la Ville de Lillers
9th Tacx Pro Classic
9th Nationale Sluitingsprijs
2018
3rd Schaal Sels
8th Dwars door West–Vlaanderen
2019
3rd Grote Prijs Stad Zottegem
4th Trofeo Palma
4th Antwerpse Havenpijl
4th Grote Prijs Jef Scherens
5th Tacx Pro Classic
5th Omloop Mandel-Leie-Schelde
7th Münsterland Giro
8th Schaal Sels
9th Famenne Ardenne Classic
10th Grote Prijs Marcel Kint
2020
8th Grote Prijs Jean-Pierre Monseré
2021
3rd Trofeo Alcúdia–Port d'Alcúdia
4th Egmont Cycling Race
6th Binche–Chimay–Binche
2022
5th Memorial Rik Van Steenbergen
10th Elfstedenronde
2023
9th Nokere Koerse
