= Thimo Willems =

Belgian cyclist

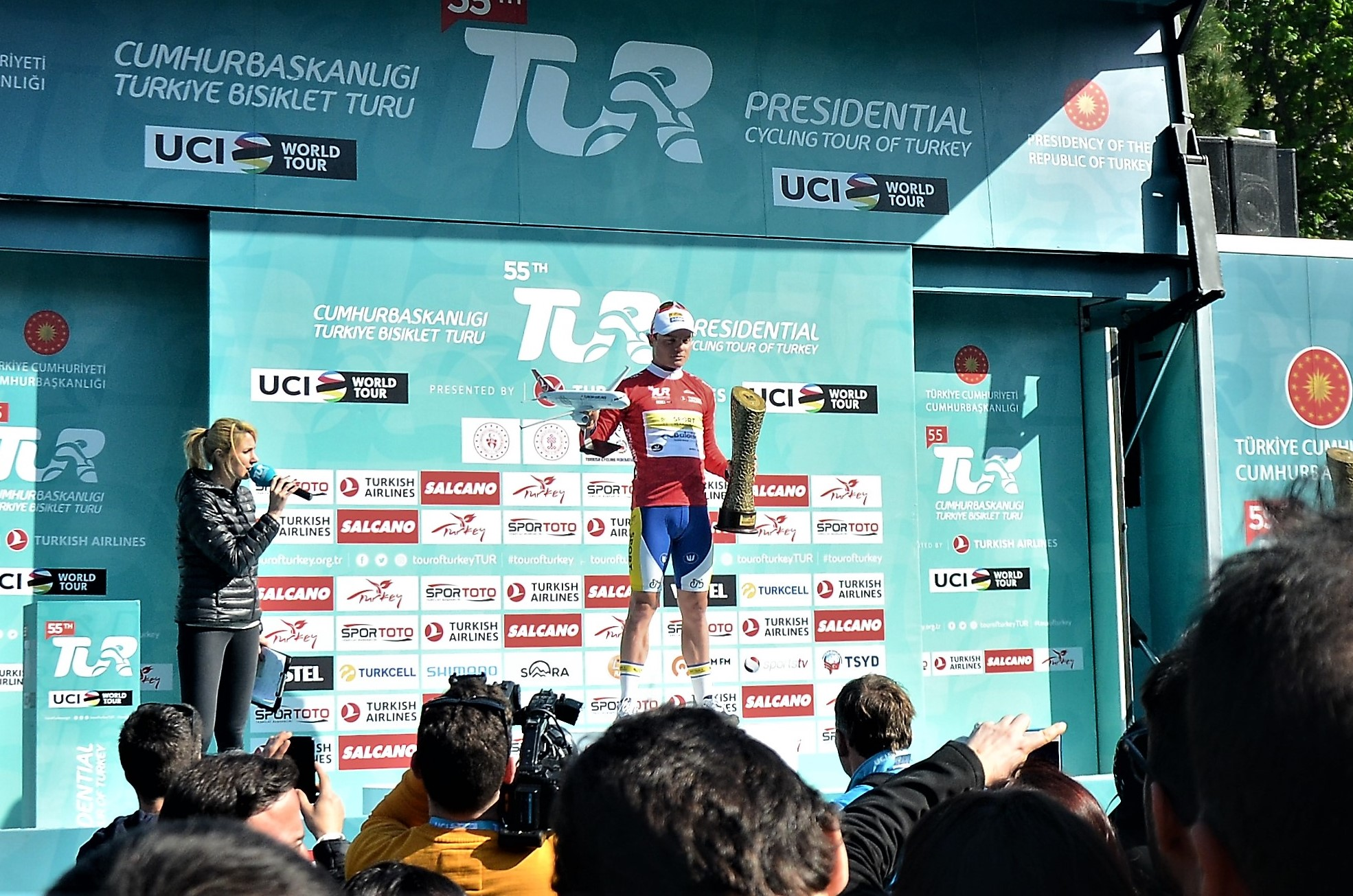
- Willems at the 2019 Tour of Turkey award ceremony.

Personal information
- Full name: Thimo Willems
- Born: 9 February 1996 (age 30) Jette, Belgium
- Height: 1.75 m (5 ft 9 in)
- Weight: 67 kg (148 lb)

Cycling career
- Sport: Cycling
- Current team: VolkerWessels Cycling Team
- Discipline: Road
- Role: Rider

Amateur teams
- 2013: Cube Spie–Douterloigne
- 2014: APT–Spie–Douterloigne
- 2015: BCV Works–Soenens Jielker Geldhof
- 2016: Prorace Cycling Team
- 2017–2018: EFC–L&R–Vulsteke

Professional teams
- 2019–2021: Sport Vlaanderen–Baloise
- 2022: Minerva Cycling Team
- 2023–: VolkerWessels Cycling Team

Thimo Willems (born 9 February 1996) is a Belgian racing cyclist, who currently rides for UCI Continental team VolkerWessels Cycling Team. In April 2019, he won the mountains classification at the 2019 Presidential Tour of Turkey.

== Major results ==
2013
2nd Overall Keizer der Juniores
5th Overall Driedaagse van Axel

1st Young rider classification

2014
6th Overall Driedaagse van Axel

1st Stage 3

2018
2nd Grand Prix des Marbriers
2019
1st Mountains classification, Tour of Turkey
2021
7th Ronde van Drenthe
2022
2nd Brussels Cycling Classic
3rd Grand Prix Criquielion
2023
1st Midden-Brabant Poort Omloop
6th Egmont Cycling Race
