= Tacx Pro Classic =

Road bicycle race in the Netherlands

Race details
- Date: October
- Region: Zeeland, Netherlands
- English name: Tacx Pro Classic
- Local name: Ronde van Zeeland (in Dutch)
- Discipline: Road
- Competition: UCI Europe Tour
- Type: One-day race
- Organiser: Stichting Zeeuws Wielerweekend

History
- First edition: 2017
- Editions: 3 (as of 2019)
- First winner: Timo Roosen (NED)
- Most wins: No repeat winners
- Most recent: Dylan Groenewegen (NED)

Tacx Pro Classic is a professional road bicycle race in the Netherlands. The event is part of the UCI Europe Tour calendar of events with a ranking of 1.1. While considered a new event, it can be seen, as a successor to the Delta Tour Zeeland and Ronde van Zeeland Seaports.

== Winners ==
Year	Country	Rider	Team
2017	Netherlands	Timo Roosen	LottoNL–Jumbo
2018	Netherlands	Peter Schulting	Monkey Town Continental Team
2019	Netherlands	Dylan Groenewegen	Team Jumbo–Visma
