= 2016 Belgian Road Cycling Cup =

The 2016 Belgian Road Cycling Cup (known as the Napoleon Games Cycling Cup for sponsorship reasons) was the inaugural edition of the Belgian Road Cycling Cup and was won by Timothy Dupont.

== Events ==
Date	Event	Winner	Team	Series leader	Leading Team
2 March	Le Samyn	Niki Terpstra (NED)	Etixx–Quick-Step	Niki Terpstra (NED)	LottoNL–Jumbo
18 March	Handzame Classic	Erik Baška (SVK)	Tinkoff	Niki Terpstra (NED)	LottoNL–Jumbo
4 June	Heistse Pijl	Dylan Groenewegen (NED)	LottoNL–Jumbo	Dylan Groenewegen (NED)	LottoNL–Jumbo
22 June	Halle–Ingooigem	Dries De Bondt (BEL)	Verandas Willems	Dylan Groenewegen (NED)	Etixx–Quick-Step
5 August	Dwars door het Hageland	Niki Terpstra (NED)	Etixx–Quick-Step	Niki Terpstra (NED)	Etixx–Quick-Step
21 August	Grote Prijs Jef Scherens	Dimitri Claeys (BEL)	Wanty–Groupe Gobert	Niki Terpstra (NED)	Lotto–Soudal
16 September	Kampioenschap van Vlaanderen	Timothy Dupont (BEL)	Verandas Willems	Dries De Bondt (BEL)	Wanty–Groupe Gobert
2 October	Eurométropole	Dylan Groenewegen (NED)	LottoNL–Jumbo	Dylan Groenewegen (NED)	LottoNL–Jumbo
4 October	Binche–Chimay–Binche	Arnaud Démare (FRA)	FDJ	Dylan Groenewegen (NED)	Lotto–Soudal
11 November	Nationale Sluitingsprijs	Roy Jans (BEL)	Wanty–Groupe Gobert	Timothy Dupont (BEL)	Lotto–Soudal

== Race results ==
In each race, the top 20 riders scored points for the general classification.

=== Le Samyn ===
Result
Rank	Rider	Team	Time
1	Niki Terpstra (NED)	Etixx–Quick-Step	4h 52' 52"
2	Scott Thwaites (GBR)	Bora–Argon 18	+ 19"
3	Florian Sénéchal (FRA)	Cofidis	+ 37"
4	Loïc Vliegen (BEL)	BMC Racing Team	+ 37"
5	Nils Politt (GER)	Team Katusha	+ 37"
6	Dylan Groenewegen (NED)	LottoNL–Jumbo	+ 44"
7	Sven Erik Bystrøm (NOR)	Team Katusha	+ 44"
8	Tim Declercq (BEL)	Topsport Vlaanderen–Baloise	+ 46"
9	Maarten Wynants (BEL)	LottoNL–Jumbo	+ 48"
10	Tony Hurel (FRA)	Direct Énergie	+ 1' 00"
11	Maxime Daniel (FRA)	AG2R La Mondiale	+ 3' 39"
12	Daniel McLay (GBR)	Fortuneo–Vital Concept	+ 4' 21"
13	Sean De Bie (BEL)	Lotto–Soudal	+ 5' 58"
14	Floris De Tier (BEL)	Topsport Vlaanderen–Baloise	+ 5' 59"
15	Gediminas Bagdonas (LTU)	AG2R La Mondiale	+ 6' 06"
16	Olivier Pardini (BEL)	Wallonie-Bruxelles–Group Protect	+ 6' 15"
17	Sander Helven (BEL)	Topsport Vlaanderen–Baloise	+ 6' 15"
18	Twan Castelijns (NED)	LottoNL–Jumbo	+ 6' 15"
19	Ralf Matzka (GER)	Bora–Argon 18	+ 6' 15"
20	Davide Martinelli (ITA)	Etixx–Quick-Step	+ 6' 15"

=== Handzame Classic ===
Result
Rank	Rider	Team	Time
1	Erik Baška (SVK)	Tinkoff	4h 40' 12"
2	Dylan Groenewegen (NED)	LottoNL–Jumbo	+ 0"
3	Gianni Meersman (BEL)	Etixx–Quick-Step	+ 0"
4	Bert Van Lerberghe (BEL)	Topsport Vlaanderen–Baloise	+ 0"
5	André Looij (NED)	Roompot–Oranje Peloton	+ 0"
6	Ivan Savitskiy (RUS)	Gazprom–RusVelo	+ 0"
7	Timothy Dupont (BEL)	Verandas Willems	+ 0"
8	Mamyr Stash (RUS)	Gazprom–RusVelo	+ 0"
9	Jelle Mannaerts (BEL)	Superano Ham–Isorex	+ 0"
10	Phil Bauhaus (GER)	Bora–Argon 18	+ 0"
11	Eduard-Michael Grosu (ROM)	Nippo–Vini Fantini	+ 0"
12	Gerry Druyts (BEL)	Crelan–Vastgoedservice	+ 0"
13	Kristoffer Halvorsen (NOR)	Team Joker	+ 0"
14	Scott Thwaites (GBR)	Bora–Argon 18	+ 0"
15	Amaury Capiot (BEL)	Topsport Vlaanderen–Baloise	+ 0"
16	Kevin Suarez (BEL)	Superano Ham–Isorex	+ 0"
17	Roy Jans (BEL)	Wanty–Groupe Gobert	+ 0"
18	Mads Pedersen (DEN)	Stölting Service Group	+ 0"
19	Aidis Kruopis (LTU)	Verandas Willems	+ 0"
20	Daniele Colli (ITA)	Nippo–Vini Fantini	+ 0"

=== Heistse Pijl ===
Result
Rank	Rider	Team	Time
1	Dylan Groenewegen (NED)	LottoNL–Jumbo	4h 03' 55"
2	Wouter Wippert (NED)	Cannondale	+ 0"
3	Aidis Kruopis (LTU)	Verandas Willems	+ 0"
4	Kenny Dehaes (BEL)	Wanty–Groupe Gobert	+ 0"
5	Sean De Bie (BEL)	Lotto–Soudal	+ 0"
6	Matti Breschel (DEN)	Cannondale	+ 0"
7	Maciej Paterski (POL)	CCC–Sprandi–Polkowice	+ 0"
8	Dries De Bondt (BEL)	Verandas Willems	+ 0"
9	Tiesj Benoot (BEL)	Lotto–Soudal	+ 0"
10	Bert Van Lerberghe (BEL)	Topsport Vlaanderen–Baloise	+ 0"
11	Michel Kreder (NED)	Roompot–Oranje Peloton	+ 0"
12	Julien Vermote (BEL)	Etixx–Quick-Step	+ 0"
13	Tom Van Asbroeck (BEL)	LottoNL–Jumbo	+ 0"
14	Jürgen Roelandts (BEL)	Lotto–Soudal	+ 0"
15	Timo Roosen (NED)	LottoNL–Jumbo	+ 0"
16	Paul Martens (GER)	LottoNL–Jumbo	+ 0"
17	Pim Ligthart (NED)	Lotto–Soudal	+ 0"
18	Maarten Wynants (BEL)	LottoNL–Jumbo	+ 0"
19	Joeri Stallaert (BEL)	Cibel–Cebon	+ 3"
20	Timothy Stevens (BEL)	Crelan–Vastgoedservice	+ 3"

=== Halle–Ingooigem ===
Result
Rank	Rider	Team	Time
1	Dries De Bondt (BEL)	Verandas Willems	4h 45' 22"
2	Jens Keukeleire (BEL)	Belgium	+ 0"
3	Edward Theuns (BEL)	Belgium	+ 13"
4	Nikolas Maes (BEL)	Etixx–Quick-Step	+ 13"
5	Jelle Vanendert (BEL)	Lotto–Soudal	+ 13"
6	Dimitri Claeys (BEL)	Wanty–Groupe Gobert	+ 13"
7	Fernando Gaviria (COL)	Etixx–Quick-Step	+ 17"
8	Arnaud Démare (FRA)	FDJ	+ 17"
9	Tim Merlier (BEL)	Crelan–Vastgoedservice	+ 17"
10	Timothy Dupont (BEL)	Verandas Willems	+ 17"
11	Baptiste Planckaert (BEL)	Wallonie-Bruxelles–Group Protect	+ 17"
12	Jelle Mannaerts (BEL)	Superano Ham–Isorex	+ 17"
13	Pieter Vanspeybrouck (BEL)	Topsport Vlaanderen–Baloise	+ 17"
14	Gijs Van Hoecke (BEL)	Topsport Vlaanderen–Baloise	+ 17"
15	Kenny Dehaes (BEL)	Wanty–Groupe Gobert	+ 17"
16	Laurens Sweeck (BEL)	ERA–Murprotec	+ 17"
17	Yoann Offredo (FRA)	FDJ	+ 17"
18	Dennis Coenen (BEL)	Crelan–Vastgoedservice	+ 17"
19	Adam Phelan (AUS)	Drapac Professional Cycling	+ 17"
20	Xandro Meurisse (BEL)	Crelan–Vastgoedservice	+ 17"

=== Dwars door het Hageland ===
Result
Rank	Rider	Team	Time
1	Niki Terpstra (NED)	Etixx–Quick-Step	4h 27' 08"
2	Wout van Aert (BEL)	Crelan–Vastgoedservice	+ 1"
3	Florian Sénéchal (FRA)	Cofidis	+ 1"
4	Jelle Wallays (BEL)	Lotto–Soudal	+ 1"
5	Marco Marcato (ITA)	Wanty–Groupe Gobert	+ 8"
6	Liam Bertazzo (ITA)	Wilier Triestina–Southeast	+ 8"
7	Tim Declercq (BEL)	Topsport Vlaanderen–Baloise	+ 11"
8	Tom Stewart (GBR)	Madison Genesis	+ 21"
9	Sean De Bie (BEL)	Lotto–Soudal	+ 21"
10	Timothy Dupont (BEL)	Verandas Willems	+ 21"
11	Hugo Hofstetter (FRA)	Cofidis	+ 21"
12	Stijn Steels (BEL)	Topsport Vlaanderen–Baloise	+ 33"
13	Baptiste Planckaert (BEL)	Wallonie-Bruxelles–Group Protect	+ 46"
14	Jenthe Biermans (BEL)	Wanty–Groupe Gobert	+ 1' 01"
15	Tim Kerkhof (NED)	Roompot–Oranje Peloton	+ 1' 04"
16	Jérôme Baugnies (BEL)	Wanty–Groupe Gobert	+ 1' 06"
17	Michel Kreder (NED)	Roompot–Oranje Peloton	+ 1' 10"
18	Daniel Turek (CZE)	Cycling Academy	+ 1' 13"
19	Dimitri Claeys (BEL)	Wanty–Groupe Gobert	+ 1' 21"
20	Mark McNally (GBR)	Wanty–Groupe Gobert	+ 1' 24"

=== Grote Prijs Jef Scherens ===
Result
Rank	Rider	Team	Time
1	Dimitri Claeys (BEL)	Wanty–Groupe Gobert	4h 19' 34"
2	Pim Ligthart (NED)	Lotto–Soudal	+ 4"
3	Roman Maikin (RUS)	Gazprom–RusVelo	+ 8"
4	Boris Vallée (BEL)	Fortuneo–Vital Concept	+ 8"
5	Dion Smith (NZL)	ONE Pro Cycling	+ 8"
6	Sean De Bie (BEL)	Lotto–Soudal	+ 8"
7	Arjen Livyns (BEL)	Verandas Willems	+ 8"
8	Dries De Bondt (BEL)	Verandas Willems	+ 8"
9	Joeri Stallaert (BEL)	Cibel–Cebon	+ 8"
10	Gianni Vermeersch (BEL)	Verandas Willems	+ 8"
11	Amaury Capiot (BEL)	Topsport Vlaanderen–Baloise	+ 8"
12	Mihkel Räim (EST)	Cycling Academy	+ 8"
13	Jesper Asselman (NED)	Roompot–Oranje Peloton	+ 8"
14	Tim Wellens (BEL)	Lotto–Soudal	+ 8"
15	Antoine Warnier (BEL)	Wallonie-Bruxelles–Group Protect	+ 8"
16	Oscar Riesebeek (NED)	Metec–TKH	+ 8"
17	Huub Duyn (NED)	Roompot–Oranje Peloton	+ 8"
18	Sébastien Delfosse (BEL)	Wallonie-Bruxelles–Group Protect	+ 8"
19	Jari Verstraeten (BEL)	Verandas Willems	+ 8"
20	Vegard Breen (NOR)	Fortuneo–Vital Concept	+ 8"

=== Kampioenschap van Vlaanderen ===
Result
Rank	Rider	Team	Time
1	Timothy Dupont (BEL)	Verandas Willems	4h 14' 03"
2	Fernando Gaviria (COL)	Etixx–Quick-Step	+ 0"
3	Raymond Kreder (NED)	Roompot–Oranje Peloton	+ 0"
4	Kenny Dehaes (BEL)	Wanty–Groupe Gobert	+ 0"
5	Kris Boeckmans (BEL)	Lotto–Soudal	+ 0"
6	Bert Van Lerberghe (BEL)	Topsport Vlaanderen–Baloise	+ 0"
7	Amaury Capiot (BEL)	Topsport Vlaanderen–Baloise	+ 0"
8	Roy Jans (BEL)	Wanty–Groupe Gobert	+ 0"
9	Joeri Stallaert (BEL)	Cibel–Cebon	+ 0"
10	Emiel Vermeulen (BEL)	Team3M	+ 0"
11	Tom Van Asbroeck (BEL)	LottoNL–Jumbo	+ 0"
12	Daniel McLay (GBR)	Fortuneo–Vital Concept	+ 0"
13	Mirko Tedeschi (ITA)	Wilier Triestina–Southeast	+ 0"
14	Julien Stassen (BEL)	Wallonie-Bruxelles–Group Protect	+ 0"
15	Emiel Wastyn (BEL)	An Post–Chain Reaction	+ 0"
16	Mike Teunissen (NED)	LottoNL–Jumbo	+ 0"
17	Justin Jules (FRA)	Veranclassic–Ago	+ 0"
18	Jelle Mannaerts (BEL)	Superano Ham–Isorex	+ 0"
19	Dion Smith (NZL)	ONE Pro Cycling	+ 0"
20	Anders Skaarseth (NOR)	Team Joker Byggtorget	+ 0"

=== Eurométropole ===
Result
Rank	Rider	Team	Time
1	Dylan Groenewegen (NED)	LottoNL–Jumbo	4h 21' 55"
2	Oliver Naesen (BEL)	IAM Cycling	+ 0"
3	Tom Boonen (BEL)	Etixx–Quick-Step	+ 0"
4	Amaury Capiot (BEL)	Topsport Vlaanderen–Baloise	+ 0"
5	Florian Sénéchal (FRA)	Cofidis	+ 0"
6	Nils Politt (GER)	Team Katusha	+ 0"
7	Joeri Calleeuw (BEL)	Verandas Willems	+ 0"
8	Jens Debusschere (BEL)	Lotto–Soudal	+ 0"
9	Maarten Wynants (BEL)	LottoNL–Jumbo	+ 0"
10	Jürgen Roelandts (BEL)	Lotto–Soudal	+ 0"
11	Kenneth Vanbilsen (BEL)	Cofidis	+ 0"
12	Nikolas Maes (BEL)	Etixx–Quick-Step	+ 0"
13	Julien Vermote (BEL)	Etixx–Quick-Step	+ 4"
14	Yves Lampaert (BEL)	Etixx–Quick-Step	+ 4"
15	Jelle Wallays (BEL)	Lotto–Soudal	+ 1' 38"
16	Fernando Gaviria (COL)	Etixx–Quick-Step	+ 1' 38"
17	Anton Vorobyev (RUS)	Team Katusha	+ 1' 38"
18	Mike Teunissen (NED)	LottoNL–Jumbo	+ 6' 36"
19	Pim Ligthart (NED)	Lotto–Soudal	+ 7' 28"
20	Dimitri Peyskens (BEL)	Veranclassic–Ago	+ 7' 30"

=== Binche–Chimay–Binche ===
Result
Rank	Rider	Team	Time
1	Arnaud Démare (FRA)	FDJ	4h 32' 28"
2	Zdeněk Štybar (CZE)	Etixx–Quick-Step	+ 0"
3	Jürgen Roelandts (BEL)	Lotto–Soudal	+ 2"
4	Greg Van Avermaet (BEL)	BMC Racing Team	+ 2"
5	Amaury Capiot (BEL)	Topsport Vlaanderen–Baloise	+ 4"
6	Timothy Dupont (BEL)	Verandas Willems	+ 4"
7	Jens Debusschere (BEL)	Lotto–Soudal	+ 4"
8	Adrien Petit (FRA)	Direct Énergie	+ 4"
9	Jonas van Genechten (BEL)	IAM Cycling	+ 4"
10	Oliver Naesen (BEL)	IAM Cycling	+ 4"
11	Baptiste Planckaert (BEL)	Wallonie-Bruxelles–Group Protect	+ 4"
12	Aksel Nõmmela (EST)	Leopard Pro Cycling	+ 4"
13	Alexander Krieger (GER)	Leopard Pro Cycling	+ 4"
14	Florian Sénéchal (FRA)	Cofidis	+ 4"
15	Rick Zabel (GER)	BMC Racing Team	+ 4"
16	Jesper Asselman (NED)	Roompot–Oranje Peloton	+ 4"
17	Mike Teunissen (NED)	LottoNL–Jumbo	+ 4"
18	Borut Božič (SLO)	Cofidis	+ 4"
19	Tom Boonen (BEL)	Etixx–Quick-Step	+ 4"
20	Tiesj Benoot (BEL)	Lotto–Soudal	+ 10"

=== Nationale Sluitingsprijs ===
Result
Rank	Rider	Team	Time
1	Roy Jans (BEL)	Wanty–Groupe Gobert	3h 54' 01"
2	Timothy Dupont (BEL)	Verandas Willems	+ 0"
3	Moreno Hofland (NED)	LottoNL–Jumbo	+ 0"
4	Arvid de Kleijn (NED)	Cyclingteam Jo Piels	+ 0"
5	Timothy Stevens (BEL)	Crelan–Vastgoedservice	+ 0"
6	Amaury Capiot (BEL)	Topsport Vlaanderen–Baloise	+ 0"
7	Baptiste Planckaert (BEL)	Wallonie-Bruxelles–Group Protect	+ 0"
8	Jasper De Buyst (BEL)	Lotto–Soudal	+ 0"
9	Michael Goolaerts (BEL)	Lotto–Soudal	+ 0"
10	Tosh Van der Sande (BEL)	Lotto–Soudal	+ 0"
11	Kevin Deltombe (BEL)	Lotto–Soudal	+ 0"
12	Reinier Honig (NED)	Roompot–Oranje Peloton	+ 0"
13	Gianni Marchand (BEL)	Cibel–Cebon	+ 0"
14	Christophe Masson (FRA)	Veranclassic–Ago	+ 0"
15	Matthias Legley (BEL)	Veranclassic–Ago	+ 0"
16	Joey Van Rhee (NED)	Cyclingteam Jo Piels	+ 0"
17	Stephan Bakker (NED)	Cyclingteam Jo Piels	+ 0"
18	Gediminas Kaupas (LTU)	Differdange–Losch	+ 0"
19	Stéphane Rossetto (FRA)	Cofidis	+ 0"
20	Boris Dron (BEL)	Wanty–Groupe Gobert	+ 0"

== Final standings ==
=== Individual ===
Pos.	Rider	Team	Points
1	Timothy Dupont (BEL)	Verandas Willems	373
2	Dylan Groenewegen (NED)	LottoNL–Jumbo	330
3	Dries De Bondt (BEL)	Verandas Willems	264
4	Amaury Capiot (BEL)	Topsport Vlaanderen–Baloise	248
5	Florian Sénéchal (FRA)	Cofidis	244
6	Niki Terpstra (NED)	Etixx–Quick-Step	234
7	Dimitri Claeys (BEL)	Wanty–Groupe Gobert	183
8	Sean De Bie (BEL)	Lotto–Soudal	178
9	Roy Jans (BEL)	Wanty–Groupe Gobert	151
10	Fernando Gaviria (COL)	Etixx–Quick-Step	143

=== Young rider classification ===
Pos.	Rider	Team	Points
1	Fernando Gaviria (COL)	Etixx–Quick-Step	378
2	Nils Politt (GER)	Team Katusha	225
3	Arjen Livyns (BEL)	Verandas Willems	213
4	Jimmy Duquennoy (BEL)	Wallonie-Bruxelles–Group Protect	194
5	Tiesj Benoot (BEL)	Lotto–Soudal	185
6	Wout van Aert (BEL)	Crelan–Vastgoedservice	175
7	Aksel Nõmmela (EST)	Leopard Pro Cycling	172
8	Franck Bonnamour (FRA)	Fortuneo–Vital Concept	135
9	Rayane Bouhanni (FRA)	Cofidis	124
10	Alexander Geuens (BEL)	Crelan–Vastgoedservice	122

=== Teams ===
Pos.	Team	Points
1	Lotto–Soudal	69
2	LottoNL–Jumbo	58
3	Wanty–Groupe Gobert	50
4	Etixx–Quick-Step	46
5	Verandas Willems	39
6	Crelan–Vastgoedservice	29
7	Topsport Vlaanderen–Baloise	28
8	Wallonie-Bruxelles–Group Protect	26
9	Roompot–Oranje Peloton	24
10	Cofidis	24
