= 2017 Belgian Road Cycling Cup =

The 2017 Belgian Road Cycling Cup (known as the Napoleon Games Cycling Cup for sponsorship reasons) was the second edition of the Belgian Road Cycling Cup. It was won by Jasper De Buyst who overtook Kenny Dehaes in the standings by winning the final race, Binche–Chimay–Binche. Timothy Dupont was the defending champion.

== Events ==
Compared to the initial season, Dwars door West-Vlaanderen was added to the calendar, replacing the Nationale Sluitingsprijs.

Date	Event	Winner	Team	Series leader	Leading Team
1 March	Le Samyn	Guillaume Van Keirsbulck (BEL)	Wanty–Groupe Gobert	Guillaume Van Keirsbulck (BEL)	Quick-Step Floors
5 March	Dwars door West-Vlaanderen	Jos van Emden (NED)	LottoNL–Jumbo	Guillaume Van Keirsbulck (BEL)	Quick-Step Floors
17 March	Handzame Classic	Kristoffer Halvorsen (NOR)	Joker Icopal	Guillaume Van Keirsbulck (BEL)	Roompot–Nederlandse Loterij
3 June	Heistse Pijl	Jasper De Buyst (BEL)	Lotto–Soudal	Jasper De Buyst (BEL)	Roompot–Nederlandse Loterij
21 June	Halle–Ingooigem	Arnaud Démare (FRA)	FDJ	Kenny Dehaes (BEL)	Lotto–Soudal
4 August	Dwars door het Hageland	Mathieu van der Poel (NED)	Beobank–Corendon	Kenny Dehaes (BEL)	Roompot–Nederlandse Loterij
20 August	Grote Prijs Jef Scherens	Timothy Dupont (BEL)	Vérandas Willems–Crelan	Kenny Dehaes (BEL)	Roompot–Nederlandse Loterij
15 September	Kampioenschap van Vlaanderen	Fernando Gaviria (COL)	Quick-Step Floors	Kenny Dehaes (BEL)	Roompot–Nederlandse Loterij
1 October	Eurométropole	Daniel McLay (GBR)	Fortuneo–Oscaro	Kenny Dehaes (BEL)	Roompot–Nederlandse Loterij
3 October	Binche–Chimay–Binche	Jasper De Buyst (BEL)	Lotto–Soudal	Jasper De Buyst (BEL)	LottoNL–Jumbo

== Race results ==
As opposed to the top 20 riders in 2016, the top 15 riders score points for the general classification.

=== Le Samyn ===
Result
Rank	Rider	Team	Time
1	Guillaume Van Keirsbulck (BEL)	Wanty–Groupe Gobert	4h 53' 55"
2	Alex Kirsch (LUX)	WB Veranclassic Aqua Protect	+ 0"
3	Iljo Keisse (BEL)	Quick-Step Floors	+ 11"
4	Florian Sénéchal (FRA)	Cofidis	+ 11"
5	Frederik Backaert (BEL)	Wanty–Groupe Gobert	+ 11"
6	Jesper Asselman (NED)	Roompot–Nederlandse Loterij	+ 11"
7	Frederik Frison (BEL)	Lotto–Soudal	+ 11"
8	Jos van Emden (NED)	LottoNL–Jumbo	+ 13"
9	Bert Van Lerberghe (BEL)	Sport Vlaanderen–Baloise	+ 35"
10	Maximilian Schachmann (GER)	Quick-Step Floors	+ 52"
11	Hugo Hofstetter (FRA)	Cofidis	+ 52"
12	Jelle Mannaerts (BEL)	Tarteletto–Isorex	+ 52"
13	Olivier Pardini (BEL)	WB Veranclassic Aqua Protect	+ 52"
14	Rémi Cavagna (FRA)	Quick-Step Floors	+ 52"
15	Benoît Jarrier (FRA)	Fortuneo–Vital Concept	+ 52"

=== Dwars door West-Vlaanderen ===
Result
Rank	Rider	Team	Time
1	Jos van Emden (NED)	LottoNL–Jumbo	4h 55' 38"
2	Silvan Dillier (SUI)	BMC Racing Team	+ 0"
3	Lasse Norman Hansen (DEN)	Aqua Blue Sport	+ 11"
4	Jasper De Buyst (BEL)	Lotto–Soudal	+ 33"
5	Guillaume Van Keirsbulck (BEL)	Wanty–Groupe Gobert	+ 33"
6	Jesper Asselman (NED)	Roompot–Nederlandse Loterij	+ 33"
7	Jens Debusschere (BEL)	Lotto–Soudal	+ 43"
8	Elmar Reinders (NED)	Roompot–Nederlandse Loterij	+ 43"
9	Twan Castelijns (NED)	LottoNL–Jumbo	+ 47"
10	Iljo Keisse (BEL)	Quick-Step Floors	+ 1' 16"
11	Taco van der Hoorn (NED)	Roompot–Nederlandse Loterij	+ 1' 16"
12	Brecht Dhaene (BEL)	Pauwels Sauzen–Vastgoedservice	+ 1' 37"
13	Amund Grøndahl Jansen (NOR)	LottoNL–Jumbo	+ 1' 44"
14	Florian Vachon (FRA)	Fortuneo–Vital Concept	+ 1' 44"
15	Roy Jans (BEL)	WB Veranclassic Aqua Protect	+ 1' 44"

=== Handzame Classic ===
Result
Rank	Rider	Team	Time
1	Kristoffer Halvorsen (NOR)	Joker Icopal	4h 15' 31"
2	Adam Blythe (GBR)	Aqua Blue Sport	+ 0"
3	Kenny Dehaes (BEL)	Wanty–Groupe Gobert	+ 0"
4	Baptiste Planckaert (BEL)	Team Katusha–Alpecin	+ 0"
5	Coen Vermeltfoort (NED)	Roompot–Nederlandse Loterij	+ 0"
6	André Looij (NED)	Roompot–Nederlandse Loterij	+ 0"
7	Roy Jans (BEL)	WB Veranclassic Aqua Protect	+ 0"
8	Timothy Dupont (BEL)	Vérandas Willems–Crelan	+ 0"
9	Jelle Mannaerts (BEL)	Tarteletto–Isorex	+ 0"
10	Davide Martinelli (ITA)	Quick-Step Floors	+ 0"
11	Alan Banaszek (POL)	CCC–Sprandi–Polkowice	+ 0"
12	Erik Baška (SVK)	Bora–Hansgrohe	+ 0"
13	Riccardo Stacchiotti (ITA)	Nippo–Vini Fantini	+ 0"
14	Louis Verhelst (BEL)	Pauwels Sauzen–Vastgoedservice	+ 0"
15	Aidis Kruopis (LTU)	Vérandas Willems–Crelan	+ 0"

=== Heistse Pijl ===
Result
Rank	Rider	Team	Time
1	Jasper De Buyst (BEL)	Lotto–Soudal	4h 08' 59"
2	Kenny Dehaes (BEL)	Wanty–Groupe Gobert	+ 0"
3	Joeri Stallaert (BEL)	Cibel–Cebon	+ 0"
4	Corné van Kessel (NED)	Telenet–Fidea Lions	+ 0"
5	Lawrence Naesen (BEL)	WB Veranclassic Aqua Protect	+ 0"
6	Liam Bertazzo (ITA)	Wilier Triestina–Selle Italia	+ 0"
7	Wietse Bosmans (BEL)	ERA–Circus	+ 0"
8	Lars van der Haar (NED)	Telenet–Fidea Lions	+ 0"
9	August Jensen (NOR)	Team Coop	+ 0"
10	Laurens Sweeck (BEL)	ERA–Circus	+ 0"
11	Wout van Aert (BEL)	Vérandas Willems–Crelan	+ 0"
12	Mark McNally (GBR)	Wanty–Groupe Gobert	+ 0"
13	Nikolas Maes (BEL)	Lotto–Soudal	+ 0"
14	Quinten Hermans (BEL)	Telenet–Fidea Lions	+ 8"
15	Jimmy Janssens (BEL)	Cibel–Cebon	+ 14"

=== Halle–Ingooigem ===
Result
Rank	Rider	Team	Time
1	Arnaud Démare (FRA)	FDJ	4h 39' 52"
2	Edward Theuns (BEL)	Belgium (national team)	+ 0"
3	Iljo Keisse (BEL)	Quick-Step Floors	+ 0"
4	Maxime Daniel (FRA)	Fortuneo–Vital Concept	+ 0"
5	Coen Vermeltfoort (NED)	Roompot–Nederlandse Loterij	+ 0"
6	Yorben Van Tichelt (BEL)	ERA–Circus	+ 0"
7	Timothy Dupont (BEL)	Vérandas Willems–Crelan	+ 0"
8	Jens Debusschere (BEL)	Lotto–Soudal	+ 0"
9	Roy Jans (BEL)	WB Veranclassic Aqua Protect	+ 0"
10	Joeri Stallaert (BEL)	Cibel–Cebon	+ 0"
11	Jonas van Genechten (BEL)	Cofidis	+ 0"
12	Dries Van Gestel (BEL)	Sport Vlaanderen–Baloise	+ 0"
13	Kenny Dehaes (BEL)	Wanty–Groupe Gobert	+ 0"
14	Jelle Mannaerts (BEL)	Tarteletto–Isorex	+ 0"
15	David van der Poel (NED)	Beobank–Corendon	+ 0"

=== Dwars door het Hageland ===
Result
Rank	Rider	Team	Time
1	Mathieu van der Poel (NED)	Beobank–Corendon	4h 39' 25"
2	Taco van der Hoorn (NED)	Roompot–Nederlandse Loterij	+ 0"
3	Wout van Aert (BEL)	Vérandas Willems–Crelan	+ 2"
4	Olivier Pardini (BEL)	WB Veranclassic Aqua Protect	+ 3"
5	Dimitri Claeys (BEL)	Cofidis	+ 14"
6	Florian Sénéchal (FRA)	Cofidis	+ 14"
7	Tim Merlier (BEL)	Vérandas Willems–Crelan	+ 16"
8	Kenneth Vanbilsen (BEL)	Cofidis	+ 16"
9	Benjamin Declercq (BEL)	Sport Vlaanderen–Baloise	+ 18"
10	Jimmy Janssens (BEL)	Cibel–Cebon	+ 20"
11	Frederik Backaert (BEL)	Wanty–Groupe Gobert	+ 23"
12	Pim Ligthart (NED)	Roompot–Nederlandse Loterij	+ 45"
13	Jesper Asselman (NED)	Roompot–Nederlandse Loterij	+ 45"
14	Krister Hagen (NOR)	Team Coop	+ 47"
15	Jarl Salomein (BEL)	Sport Vlaanderen–Baloise	+ 49"

== Final championship standings ==
=== Individual ===
Pos.	Rider	Team	Points
1	Jasper De Buyst (BEL)	Lotto–Soudal	86
2	Kenny Dehaes (BEL)	Wanty–Groupe Gobert	68
3	Guillaume Van Keirsbulck (BEL)	Wanty–Groupe Gobert	44
4	Timothy Dupont (BEL)	Vérandas Willems–Crelan	40
5	Iljo Keisse (BEL)	Quick-Step Floors	32
6	August Jensen (NOR)	Team Coop	31
7	Jos van Emden (NED)	LottoNL–Jumbo	30
8	Joeri Stallaert (BEL)	Cibel–Cebon	30
9	Amund Grøndahl Jansen (NOR)	LottoNL–Jumbo	27
10	Jesper Asselman (NED)	Roompot–Nederlandse Loterij	27

=== Teams ===
LottoNL–Jumbo won the teams classification by winning two of the races, whereas Roompot–Nederlandse Loterij won only one.

Pos.	Team	Points
1	LottoNL–Jumbo	52
2	Roompot–Nederlandse Loterij	52
3	WB Veranclassic Aqua Protect	51
4	Wanty–Groupe Gobert	48
5	Quick-Step Floors	43
6	Lotto–Soudal	42
7	Sport Vlaanderen–Baloise	41
8	Vérandas Willems–Crelan	35
9	Cofidis	27
10	ERA–Circus	21
