= 2018 Belgian Road Cycling Cup =

The 2018 Belgian Road Cycling Cup (known as the Napoleon Games Cycling Cup for sponsorship reasons) was the third edition of the Belgian Road Cycling Cup. Jasper De Buyst was the defending champion.

Despite not winning any of the events, Timothy Dupont won his second title after already winning the 2016 edition.

== Events ==
Compared to the previous season, the Grote Prijs Marcel Kint was added to the calendar, replacing the Handzame Classic.

Date	Event	Winner	Team	Series leader
27 February	Le Samyn	Niki Terpstra (NED)	Quick-Step Floors	Philippe Gilbert (BEL)
4 March	Dwars door West-Vlaanderen	Rémi Cavagna (FRA)	Quick-Step Floors	Florian Sénéchal (FRA)
20 May	Grote Prijs Marcel Kint	Nacer Bouhanni (FRA)	Cofidis	Florian Sénéchal (FRA)
2 June	Heistse Pijl	Emils Liepins (LAT)	ONE Pro Cycling	Cees Bol (NED)
15 June	Dwars door het Hageland	Krists Neilands (LAT)	Israel Cycling Academy	Cees Bol (NED)
19 June	Halle–Ingooigem	Danny van Poppel (NED)	LottoNL–Jumbo	Cees Bol (NED)
14 September	Kampioenschap van Vlaanderen	Dylan Groenewegen (NED)	LottoNL–Jumbo	Sean De Bie (BEL)
16 September	Grote Prijs Jef Scherens	Jasper Stuyven (BEL)	Trek–Segafredo	Sean De Bie (BEL)
22 September	Eurométropole	Mads Pedersen (DEN)	Trek–Segafredo	Sean De Bie (BEL)
2 October	Binche–Chimay–Binche	Danny van Poppel (NED)	LottoNL–Jumbo	Timothy Dupont (BEL)

== Race results ==
Since 2017, only the top 15 riders score points for the general classification. Three intermediate sprints during each race award points to the top three riders.

=== Le Samyn ===
Result
Rank	Rider	Team	Time
1	Niki Terpstra (NED)	Quick-Step Floors	4h 47' 48"
2	Philippe Gilbert (BEL)	Quick-Step Floors	+ 24"
3	Damien Gaudin (FRA)	Direct Énergie	+ 46"
4	Adrien Petit (FRA)	Direct Énergie	+ 1' 18"
5	Gediminas Bagdonas (LTU)	AG2R La Mondiale	+ 1' 18"
6	Alex Kirsch (LUX)	WB Aqua Protect Veranclassic	+ 1' 21"
7	Benoît Jarrier (FRA)	Fortuneo–Samsic	+ 1' 59"
8	Nico Denz (GER)	AG2R La Mondiale	+ 1' 59"
9	Frederik Backaert (BEL)	Wanty–Groupe Gobert	+ 1' 59"
10	Alexandre Pichot (FRA)	Direct Énergie	+ 2' 02"
11	Amaury Capiot (BEL)	Sport Vlaanderen–Baloise	+ 2' 08"
12	Guillaume Van Keirsbulck (BEL)	Wanty–Groupe Gobert	+ 2' 08"
13	Fabio Jakobsen (NED)	Quick-Step Floors	+ 2' 19"
14	Jelle Mannaerts (BEL)	Tarteletto–Isorex	+ 2' 19"
15	Tanner Putt (USA)	UnitedHealthcare	+ 2' 19"

=== Dwars door West-Vlaanderen ===
Result
Rank	Rider	Team	Time
1	Rémi Cavagna (FRA)	Quick-Step Floors	4h 28' 29"
2	Florian Sénéchal (FRA)	Quick-Step Floors	+ 3"
3	Frederik Frison (BEL)	Lotto–Soudal	+ 10"
4	Fabio Jakobsen (NED)	Quick-Step Floors	+ 55"
5	Anthony Turgis (FRA)	Cofidis	+ 55"
6	Guillaume Van Keirsbulck (BEL)	Wanty–Groupe Gobert	+ 55"
7	Jhonatan Narváez (ECU)	Quick-Step Floors	+ 55"
8	Christophe Noppe (BEL)	Sport Vlaanderen–Baloise	+ 59"
9	Michael Goolaerts (BEL)	Vérandas Willems–Crelan	+ 59"
10	Jimmy Duquennoy (BEL)	WB Aqua Protect Veranclassic	+ 59"
11	Tanner Putt (USA)	UnitedHealthcare	+ 59"
12	Pim Ligthart (NED)	Roompot–Nederlandse Loterij	+ 59"
13	Adrien Petit (FRA)	Direct Énergie	+ 59"
14	Kamil Gradek (POL)	CCC–Sprandi–Polkowice	+ 59"
15	Davide Martinelli (ITA)	Quick-Step Floors	+ 59"

=== GP Marcel Kint ===
Result
Rank	Rider	Team	Time
1	Nacer Bouhanni (FRA)	Cofidis	3h 54' 01"
2	Cees Bol (NED)	SEG Racing Academy	+ 0"
3	Dries De Bondt (BEL)	Vérandas Willems–Crelan	+ 0"
4	Edward Planckaert (BEL)	Sport Vlaanderen–Baloise	+ 0"
5	Tim Merlier (BEL)	Vérandas Willems–Crelan	+ 0"
6	Jan-Willem van Schip (NED)	Roompot–Nederlandse Loterij	+ 0"
7	Jelle Mannaerts (BEL)	Tarteletto–Isorex	+ 0"
8	Jens Adams (BEL)	Pauwels Sauzen–Vastgoedservice	+ 0"
9	Alexander Krieger (GER)	Leopard Pro Cycling	+ 0"
10	Kenneth Van Rooy (BEL)	Sport Vlaanderen–Baloise	+ 0"
11	Dennis van der Horst (NED)	Metec–TKH	+ 0"
12	Jelle Donders (BEL)	Differdange–Losch	+ 0"
13	Bert Van Lerberghe (BEL)	Cofidis	+ 0"
14	Jonas Rickaert (BEL)	Sport Vlaanderen–Baloise	+ 0"
15	Mario Spengler (SUI)	Leopard Pro Cycling	+ 0"

=== Heistse Pijl ===
Result
Rank	Rider	Team	Time
1	Emils Liepins (LAT)	ONE Pro Cycling	4h 07' 47"
2	Wouter Wippert (NED)	Roompot–Nederlandse Loterij	+ 0"
3	Aksel Nõmmela (EST)	Canyon Eisberg	+ 0"
4	Jens Adams (BEL)	Pauwels Sauzen–Vastgoedservice	+ 0"
5	Cees Bol (NED)	SEG Racing Academy	+ 2"
6	Tom Pidcock (GBR)	WIGGINS	+ 7"
7	Marcel Sieberg (GER)	Lotto–Soudal	+ 7"
8	Jelle Mannaerts (BEL)	Tarteletto–Isorex	+ 7"
9	Gustav Höög (EST)	Team Coop	+ 7"
10	Gerry Druyts (BEL)	Pauwels Sauzen–Vastgoedservice	+ 7"
11	Christopher Latham (GBR)	ONE Pro Cycling	+ 7"
12	Tosh van der Sande (BEL)	Lotto–Soudal	+ 7"
13	Kevin Deltombe (BEL)	Sport Vlaanderen–Baloise	+ 7"
14	Lennert Teugels (BEL)	Cibel–Cebon	+ 7"
15	Christophe Noppe (BEL)	Sport Vlaanderen–Baloise	+ 7"

== Championship standings ==
After Dwars door West-Vlaanderen

=== Individual ===
Pos.	Rider	Team	Points
1	Florian Sénéchal (FRA)	Quick-Step Floors	22
2	Rémi Cavagna (FRA)	Quick-Step Floors	20
3	Philippe Gilbert (BEL)	Quick-Step Floors	20
4	Niki Terpstra (NED)	Quick-Step Floors	19
5	Frederik Frison (BEL)	Lotto–Soudal	19
6	Damien Gaudin (FRA)	Direct Énergie	16
7	Adrien Petit (FRA)	Direct Énergie	15
8	Fabio Jakobsen (NED)	Quick-Step Floors	15
9	Guillaume Van Keirsbulck (BEL)	Wanty–Groupe Gobert	14
10	Alex Kirsch (LUX)	WB Aqua Protect Veranclassic	14

Classification (11–27)
Pos.	Rider	Team	Points
11	Anthony Turgis (FRA)	Cofidis	11
12	Gediminas Bagdonas (LTU)	AG2R La Mondiale	11
13	Jhonatan Narváez (ECU)	Quick-Step Floors	9
14	Benoît Jarrier (FRA)	Fortuneo–Samsic	9
15	Nico Denz (GER)	AG2R La Mondiale	8
16	Christophe Noppe (BEL)	Sport Vlaanderen–Baloise	8
17	Frederik Backaert (BEL)	Wanty–Groupe Gobert	7
18	Michael Goolaerts (BEL)	Vérandas Willems–Crelan	7
19	Jimmy Duquennoy (BEL)	WB Aqua Protect Veranclassic	6
20	Alexandre Pichot (FRA)	Direct Énergie	6
21	Tanner Putt (USA)	UnitedHealthcare	6
22	Amaury Capiot (BEL)	Sport Vlaanderen–Baloise	5
23	Pim Ligthart (NED)	Roompot–Nederlandse Loterij	4
24	Jelle Mannaerts (BEL)	Tarteletto–Isorex	2
25	Kamil Gradek (POL)	CCC–Sprandi–Polkowice	2
26	Tosh Van der Sande (BEL)	Lotto–Soudal	2
27	Davide Martinelli (ITA)	Quick-Step Floors	1

=== Teams ===
Pos.	Team	Points
1	Quick-Step Floors	24
2	Direct Énergie	14
3	Sport Vlaanderen–Baloise	14
4	Wanty–Groupe Gobert	13
5	Lotto–Soudal	11
6	Cofidis	11
7	AG2R La Mondiale	8
8	WB Aqua Protect Veranclassic	6
9	Roompot–Nederlandse Loterij	4
10	Cibel–Cebon	3

Classification (11–14)
Pos.	Team	Points
11	Vérandas Willems–Crelan	2
12	Vital Concept	2
13	AGO–Aqua Service	1
14	SEG Racing Academy	1
