= 2017 Grote Prijs Jef Scherens =

2017 UCI Europe Tour

Race details
- Dates: 20 August 2017
- Stages: 1
- Distance: 185.7 km (115.4 mi)

Results
| | Winner | Timothy Dupont (BEL) | (Vérandas Willems–Crelan) |
| | Second | Kenny Dehaes (BEL) | (Wanty–Groupe Gobert) |
| | Third | Justin Jules (FRA) | (WB Veranclassic Aqua Protect) |

The 2017 Grote Prijs Jef Scherens was the 51st edition of the Grote Prijs Jef Scherens road cycling one day race in and around Leuven It was held on 20 August 2017 as a 1.1 categorised race and was part of the 2017 UCI Europe Tour and the 2017 Belgian Road Cycling Cup.

Timothy Dupont won the race in a bunch sprint. Defending champion Dimitri Claeys was not present as his team Cofidis did not take part.

== Teams ==
Twenty teams were invited to take part in the race. These included three UCI WorldTeams, seven UCI Professional Continental teams and twelve UCI Continental teams.

UCI WorldTeams

- LottoNL–Jumbo
- Lotto–Soudal
- Quick-Step Floors

UCI Professional Continental Teams

- An Post–Chain Reaction
- Roompot–Nederlandse Loterij
- Sport Vlaanderen–Baloise
- Vérandas Willems–Crelan
- Wanty–Groupe Gobert
- WB Veranclassic Aqua Protect
- Fortuneo–Oscaro

UCI Continental Teams

- Bike Channel–Canyon
- Cibel–Cebon
- ERA–Circus
- Joker Icopal
- Leopard Pro Cycling
- Metec–TKH
- Pauwels Sauzen–Vastgoedservice
- Riwal Platform
- Tarteletto–Isorex
- Team Coop

== Result ==
Result
| Rank | Rider | Team | Time |
|---|---|---|---|
| 1 | Timothy Dupont (BEL) | Vérandas Willems–Crelan | 4h 20' 37" |
| 2 | Kenny Dehaes (BEL) | Wanty–Groupe Gobert | s.t. |
| 3 | Justin Jules (FRA) | WB Veranclassic Aqua Protect | s.t. |
| 4 | August Jensen (NOR) | Team Coop | s.t. |
| 5 | Joeri Stallaert (BEL) | Cibel–Cebon | s.t. |
| 6 | Erwann Corbel (FRA) | Fortuneo–Oscaro | s.t. |
| 7 | Braam Merlier (BEL) | ERA–Circus | s.t. |
| 8 | Alexander Krieger (GER) | Trek–Segafredo | s.t. |
| 9 | Tim Wellens (BEL) | Lotto–Soudal | s.t. |
| 10 | Davide Martinelli (ITA) | Quick-Step Floors | s.t. |
