= 2017 Nokere Koerse =

2017 UCI Europe Tour

Race details
- Dates: 15 March 2017
- Stages: 1
- Distance: 192.3 km (119.5 mi)
- Winning time: 4h 07' 31"

Results
	Winner	Nacer Bouhanni (FRA)
	Second	Adam Blythe (GBR)
	Third	Joeri Stallaert (BEL)

The 2017 Nokere Koerse was the 72nd edition of the Nokere Koerse road cycling one day race. It was held on 15 March 2017 as part of the UCI Europe Tour in category 1.HC.

The race was won by Nacer Bouhanni of Cofidis, ahead of Adam Blythe and Joeri Stallaert.

== Teams ==
Twenty-three teams of up to eight riders started the race:

UCI WorldTeams

- BMC Racing Team
- Team Katusha–Alpecin
- Lotto–Soudal
- Bora–Hansgrohe
- LottoNL–Jumbo
- Team Sunweb

UCI Professional Continental teams

- Aqua Blue Sport
- Cofidis
- Israel Cycling Academy
- Roompot–Nederlandse Loterij
- Vérandas Willems–Crelan
- WB Veranclassic Aqua Protect
- CCC–Sprandi–Polkowice
- Direct Énergie
- Gazprom–RusVelo
- Nippo–Vini Fantini
- Sport Vlaanderen–Baloise
- Wanty–Groupe Gobert
- Fortuneo–Vital Concept

UCI Continental teams

- Cibel–Cebon
- Pauwels Sauzen–Vastgoedservice
- Joker Icopal
- Tarteletto–Isorex

== Result ==
Final general classification

Rank	Rider	Team	Time
1	Nacer Bouhanni (FRA)	Cofidis	4h 07' 31"
2	Adam Blythe (GBR)	Aqua Blue Sport	s.t.
3	Joeri Stallaert (BEL)	Cibel–Cebon	s.t.
4	Phil Bauhaus (GER)	Team Sunweb	s.t.
5	Bert Van Lerberghe (BEL)	Sport Vlaanderen–Baloise	s.t.
6	Coen Vermeltfoort (NED)	Roompot–Nederlandse Loterij	s.t.
7	Rüdiger Selig (GER)	Bora–Hansgrohe	s.t.
8	André Looij (NED)	Roompot–Nederlandse Loterij	s.t.
9	Alan Banaszek (POL)	CCC–Sprandi–Polkowice	s.t.
10	Mathias De Witte (BEL)	Cibel–Cebon	s.t.
