= 2016 Tour of Belgium =

2016 UCI Europe Tour

Race details
- Dates: 25 May – 29 May
- Stages: 4 + prologue
- Distance: 555.6 km (345.2 mi)
- Winning time: 12h 27' 30"

Results
Jersey awarded to the overall winner	Winner	Dries Devenyns (BEL)	(IAM Cycling)
	Second	Reto Hollenstein (SUI)	(IAM Cycling)
	Third	Stijn Vandenbergh (BEL)	(Etixx–Quick-Step)
Jersey awarded to the points classification winner	Points	Baptiste Planckaert (BEL)	(Wallonie-Bruxelles–Group Protect)
Jersey awarded to the combativity classification winner	Combativity	Amaury Capiot (BEL)	(Topsport Vlaanderen–Baloise)
	Team	IAM Cycling	

The 2016 Tour of Belgium was the 86th edition of the Tour of Belgium cycling stage race. It took place from 25 to 29 May 2016 in Belgium as part of the 2016 UCI Europe Tour and was won by Dries Devenyns. Defending champion Greg Van Avermaet did not take part in the race.

On 28 May 2016, during the Stage 3, a crash of two motorcycles into the peloton injured 19 riders. The stage was cancelled that day and several riders abandoned the race and did not start on Stage 4. Stig Broeckx was reported to suffer severe injuries and was in a coma and vegetative (succumbing) state in the hospital in Gent.

== Teams ==
UCI WorldTeams

- Astana
- Etixx–Quick-Step
- IAM Cycling
- Lotto–Soudal
- Team Giant–Alpecin
- Team Katusha
- Trek–Segafredo
- Cannondale

UCI Professional Continental teams

- Androni Giocattoli–Sidermec
- Bora–Argon 18
- Cofidis
- Direct Énergie
- Fortuneo–Vital Concept
- Roompot–Oranje Peloton
- Topsport Vlaanderen–Baloise
- Wanty–Groupe Gobert

UCI Continental teams

- Cibel–Cebon
- Crelan–Vastgoedservice
- Team3M
- Verandas Willems
- Wallonie-Bruxelles–Group Protect
- Telenet–Fidea

== Schedule ==
Stage	Date	Course	Distance	Type	Winner	Ref
P	25 May	Beveren to Beveren	6 km (3.7 mi)	Individual time trial	Wout van Aert (BEL)	
1	26 May	Buggenhout to Knokke-Heist	174.5 km (108.4 mi)	Flat stage	Edward Theuns (BEL)	
2	27 May	Knokke-Heist to Herzele	200.9 km (124.8 mi)	Flat stage	Dries Devenyns (BEL)	
3	28 May	Verviers to Verviers	203.0 km (126.1 mi)	Intermediate stage	stage cancelled	
4	29 May	Tremelo to Tongeren	174.2 km (108.2 mi)	Intermediate stage	Zico Waeytens (BEL)	
Total		758.6 km (471.4 mi)				

== Stages ==
=== Prologue ===
25 May 2016 – Beveren to Beveren, 6 km (3.7 mi)

Result and General classification after prologue
Rank	Rider	Team	Time
1	Wout van Aert (BEL)	Crelan–Vastgoedservice	6' 52"
2	Tony Martin (GER)	Etixx–Quick-Step	+ 2"
3	Reto Hollenstein (SUI)	IAM Cycling	+ 4"
4	Niki Terpstra (NED)	Etixx–Quick-Step	+ 4"
5	Yves Lampaert (BEL)	Etixx–Quick-Step	+ 5"
6	Martin Elmiger (SUI)	IAM Cycling	+ 6"
7	Lars Boom (NED)	Astana	+ 7"
8	David Boucher (BEL)	Crelan–Vastgoedservice	+ 10"
9	Gijs Van Hoecke (BEL)	Topsport Vlaanderen–Baloise	+ 11"
10	Sylvain Chavanel (FRA)	Direct Énergie	+ 11"

=== Stage 1 ===
26 May 2016 – Buggenhout to Knokke-Heist, 174.5 km (108.4 mi)

Result of stage 1
Rank	Rider	Team	Time
1	Edward Theuns (BEL)	Trek–Segafredo	4h 14' 03"
2	Daniel McLay (GBR)	Fortuneo–Vital Concept	s.t.
3	Kenny Dehaes (BEL)	Wanty–Groupe Gobert	s.t.
4	Baptiste Planckaert (BEL)	Wallonie-Bruxelles–Group Protect	s.t.
5	Timothy Dupont (BEL)	Verandas Willems	s.t.
6	Jonas van Genechten (BEL)	IAM Cycling	s.t.
7	Jonas Ahlstrand (SWE)	Cofidis	s.t.
8	Reto Hollenstein (SUI)	IAM Cycling	s.t.
9	Francesco Chicchi (ITA)	Androni Giocattoli–Sidermec	s.t.
10	Pieter Vanspeybrouck (BEL)	Topsport Vlaanderen–Baloise	s.t.

General classification after stage 1
Rank	Rider	Team	Time
1	Wout van Aert (BEL)	Crelan–Vastgoedservice	4h 20' 55"
2	Tony Martin (GER)	Etixx–Quick-Step	+ 2"
3	Yves Lampaert (BEL)	Etixx–Quick-Step	+ 4"
4	Reto Hollenstein (SUI)	IAM Cycling	+ 4"
5	Niki Terpstra (NED)	Etixx–Quick-Step	+ 4"
6	Edward Theuns (BEL)	Trek–Segafredo	+ 5"
7	Martin Elmiger (SUI)	IAM Cycling	+ 6"
8	Lars Boom (NED)	Astana	+ 7"
9	David Boucher (BEL)	Crelan–Vastgoedservice	+ 10"
10	Daniel McLay (GBR)	Fortuneo–Vital Concept	+ 10"

=== Stage 2 ===
27 May 2016 – Knokke-Heist to Herzele, 200.9 km (124.8 mi)

Result of stage 2
Rank	Rider	Team	Time
1	Dries Devenyns (BEL)	IAM Cycling	4h 32' 26"
2	Baptiste Planckaert (BEL)	Wallonie-Bruxelles–Group Protect	+ 1"
3	Stijn Vandenbergh (BEL)	Etixx–Quick-Step	+ 1"
4	Tiesj Benoot (BEL)	Lotto–Soudal	+ 1"
5	Pieter Vanspeybrouck (BEL)	Topsport Vlaanderen–Baloise	+ 1"
6	Sergey Chernetskiy (RUS)	Team Katusha	+ 1"
7	Enrico Gasparotto (ITA)	Wanty–Groupe Gobert	+ 1"
8	Reto Hollenstein (SUI)	IAM Cycling	+ 1"
9	Floris De Tier (BEL)	Topsport Vlaanderen–Baloise	+ 1"
10	Edward Theuns (BEL)	Trek–Segafredo	+ 40"

General classification after stage 2
Rank	Rider	Team	Time
1	Dries Devenyns (BEL)	IAM Cycling	8h 53' 22"
2	Reto Hollenstein (SUI)	IAM Cycling	+ 4"
3	Stijn Vandenbergh (BEL)	Etixx–Quick-Step	+ 7"
4	Sergey Chernetskiy (RUS)	Team Katusha	+ 16"
5	Baptiste Planckaert (BEL)	Wallonie-Bruxelles–Group Protect	+ 18"
6	Enrico Gasparotto (ITA)	Wanty–Groupe Gobert	+ 20"
7	Tiesj Benoot (BEL)	Lotto–Soudal	+ 23"
8	Pieter Vanspeybrouck (BEL)	Topsport Vlaanderen–Baloise	+ 23"
9	Wout van Aert (BEL)	Crelan–Vastgoedservice	+ 39"
10	Yves Lampaert (BEL)	Etixx–Quick-Step	+ 43"

=== Stage 3 ===
28 May 2016 – Verviers to Verviers, 203.0 km (126.1 mi)

Two motorbikes crashed and fell into the peloton at high speeds about 65 km into the stage. 19 riders were involved into the crash, with Stig Broeckx, Fredrik Ludvigsson, Jesper Asselman, Andrea Guardini, Kristoffer Skjerping and Pieter Jacobs all transported to the hospital because of injuries. Broeckx, who had just recovered from injury after already being hit by a motorbike during the 2016 Kuurne–Brussels–Kuurne race two months earlier, was in worst shape as he immediately went unconscious and was later diagnosed to have two intracranial hemorrhages and a broken eye socket. Race direction and riders decided not to continue the race. A closed peloton rode to the finish in Verviers as the stage was cancelled.

=== Stage 4 ===
29 May 2016 – Tremelo to Tongeren, 174.2 km (108.2 mi)

Several riders did not start the race, most notably the entire team of Stig Broeckx, Lotto–Soudal.

Result of stage 4
Rank	Rider	Team	Time
1	Zico Waeytens (BEL)	Team Giant–Alpecin	3h 34' 08"
2	Daniel McLay (GBR)	Fortuneo–Vital Concept	s.t.
3	Timothy Dupont (BEL)	Verandas Willems	s.t.
4	Baptiste Planckaert (BEL)	Wallonie-Bruxelles–Group Protect	s.t.
5	Shane Archbold (NZL)	Bora–Argon 18	s.t.
6	Enrico Gasparotto (ITA)	Wanty–Groupe Gobert	s.t.
7	Niki Terpstra (NED)	Etixx–Quick-Step	s.t.
8	Michel Kreder (NED)	Roompot–Oranje Peloton	s.t.
9	Pieter Vanspeybrouck (BEL)	Topsport Vlaanderen–Baloise	s.t.
10	Julien Vermote (BEL)	Etixx–Quick-Step	s.t.

Final general classification
Rank	Rider	Team	Time
1	Dries Devenyns (BEL)	IAM Cycling	12h 27' 30"
2	Reto Hollenstein (SUI)	IAM Cycling	+ 4"
3	Stijn Vandenbergh (BEL)	Etixx–Quick-Step	+ 4"
4	Sergey Chernetskiy (RUS)	Team Katusha	+ 16"
5	Baptiste Planckaert (BEL)	Wallonie-Bruxelles–Group Protect	+ 18"
6	Enrico Gasparotto (ITA)	Wanty–Groupe Gobert	+ 20"
7	Pieter Vanspeybrouck (BEL)	Topsport Vlaanderen–Baloise	+ 23"
8	Wout van Aert (BEL)	Crelan–Vastgoedservice	+ 39"
9	Yves Lampaert (BEL)	Etixx–Quick-Step	+ 43"
10	Niki Terpstra (NED)	Etixx–Quick-Step	+ 43"

== Classification leadership table ==
Stage	Winner	General classification Algemeen klassement	Points classification Puntenklassement	Combativity classification Prijs van de strijdlust	Teams classification Ploegenklassement
P	Wout van Aert	Wout van Aert	Wout van Aert	Not awarded	Etixx–Quick-Step
1	Edward Theuns	Wout van Aert	Edward Theuns	Ludwig De Winter	Etixx–Quick-Step
2	Dries Devenyns	Dries Devenyns	Baptiste Planckaert	Amaury Capiot	IAM Cycling
3	stage cancelled	Dries Devenyns	Baptiste Planckaert	Amaury Capiot	IAM Cycling
4	Zico Waeytens	Dries Devenyns	Baptiste Planckaert	Amaury Capiot	IAM Cycling
Final		Dries Devenyns	Baptiste Planckaert	Amaury Capiot	IAM Cycling

== Standings ==
Legend
Red jersey	Denotes the leader of the General classification	Blue jersey	Denotes the leader of the Points classification	Black jersey	Denotes the leader of the Combativity classification

=== General classification ===
Final
Rank	Rider	Team	Time
1	Dries Devenyns (BEL)	IAM Cycling	12h 27' 30"
2	Reto Hollenstein (SUI)	IAM Cycling	+ 4"
3	Stijn Vandenbergh (BEL)	Etixx–Quick-Step	+ 4"
4	Sergey Chernetskiy (RUS)	Team Katusha	+ 16"
5	Baptiste Planckaert (BEL)	Wallonie-Bruxelles–Group Protect	+ 18"
6	Enrico Gasparotto (ITA)	Wanty–Groupe Gobert	+ 20"
7	Pieter Vanspeybrouck (BEL)	Topsport Vlaanderen–Baloise	+ 23"
8	Wout van Aert (BEL)	Crelan–Vastgoedservice	+ 39"
9	Yves Lampaert (BEL)	Etixx–Quick-Step	+ 43"
10	Niki Terpstra (NED)	Etixx–Quick-Step	+ 43"

=== Points classification ===
Final
Rank	Rider	Team	Time
1	Baptiste Planckaert (BEL)	Wallonie-Bruxelles–Group Protect	63
2	Daniel McLay (GBR)	Fortuneo–Vital Concept	50
3	Edward Theuns (BEL)	Trek–Segafredo	40
4	Reto Hollenstein (SUI)	IAM Cycling	40
5	Timothy Dupont (BEL)	Verandas Willems	39
6	Pieter Vanspeybrouck (BEL)	Topsport Vlaanderen–Baloise	38
7	Dries Devenyns (BEL)	IAM Cycling	30
8	Zico Waeytens (BEL)	Team Giant–Alpecin	30
9	Enrico Gasparotto (ITA)	Wanty–Groupe Gobert	28
10	Niki Terpstra (NED)	Etixx–Quick-Step	27

=== Combativity classification ===
Final
Rank	Rider	Team	Time
1	Amaury Capiot (BEL)	Topsport Vlaanderen–Baloise	48
2	Brian Van Goethem (NED)	Roompot–Oranje Peloton	21
3	Lawrence Naesen (BEL)	Cibel–Cebon	18
4	Guillaume Van Keirsbulck (BEL)	Etixx–Quick-Step	16
5	Benjamin Verraes (BEL)	Cibel–Cebon	12
6	Christophe Prémont (BEL)	Verandas Willems	12
7	Stijn Vandenbergh (BEL)	Etixx–Quick-Step	10
8	Dries Devenyns (BEL)	IAM Cycling	8
9	Pieter Vanspeybrouck (BEL)	Topsport Vlaanderen–Baloise	8
10	Toon Aerts (BEL)	Telenet–Fidea	8

=== Team classification ===
	Team	Points
1	IAM Cycling	37h 23' 29"
2	Etixx–Quick-Step	+ 30"
3	Topsport Vlaanderen–Baloise	+ 40"
4	Team Katusha	+ 1' 07"
5	Wanty–Groupe Gobert	+ 1' 35"
6	Wallonie-Bruxelles–Group Protect	+ 1' 37"
7	Cannondale	+ 1' 50"
8	Direct Énergie	+ 1' 52"
9	Roompot–Oranje Peloton	+ 1' 55"
10	Verandas Willems	+ 1' 57"
