= Dennis Coenen =

Belgian cyclist

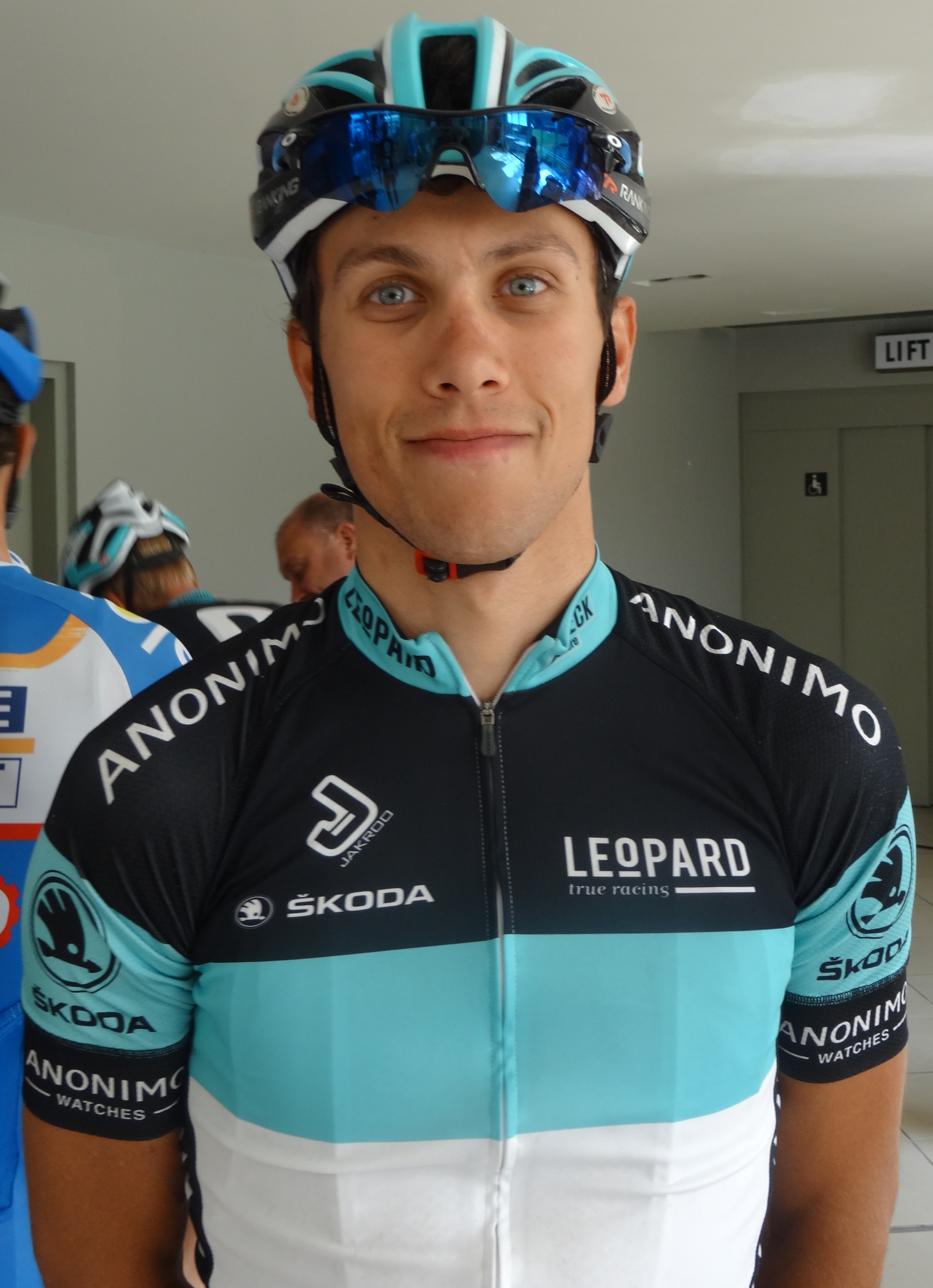
- Coenen in 2014

Personal information
- Full name: Dennis Coenen
- Born: 11 November 1991 (age 34) Genk, Belgium
- Height: 1.79 m (5 ft 10 in)
- Weight: 69 kg (152 lb)

Cycling career
- Sport: Cycling
- Current team: Retired
- Discipline: Road
- Role: Rider

Amateur teams
- 2013: Bofrost–Prorace
- 2020: Acrog–Tormans
- 2021: VP Consulting–Prorace

Professional teams
- 2014: Leopard Development Team
- 2015–2016: Vastgoedservice–Golden Palace
- 2017–2019: Cibel–Cebon

Dennis Coenen (born 11 November 1991) is a Belgian former professional cyclist.

== Major results ==
2009
1st Overall Sint-Martinusprijs Kontich

1st Stage 4

6th Trofee Der Vlaamse Ardennen
10th Omloop Het Nieuwsblad Juniors
2014
1st Ronde van Overijssel
1st Stadsprijs Geraardsbergen
5th Antwerpse Havenpijl
8th Baronie Breda Classic
8th Ronde Pévéloise
10th Münsterland Giro
2015
8th Nationale Sluitingsprijs
2016
3rd Omloop Het Nieuwsblad Beloften
2017
10th Kernen Omloop Echt-Susteren
2018
3rd De Kustpijl
8th Internationale Wielertrofee Jong Maar Moedig
2019
10th Midden–Brabant Poort Omloop
