= Joeri Stallaert =

Belgian cyclist (born 1991)

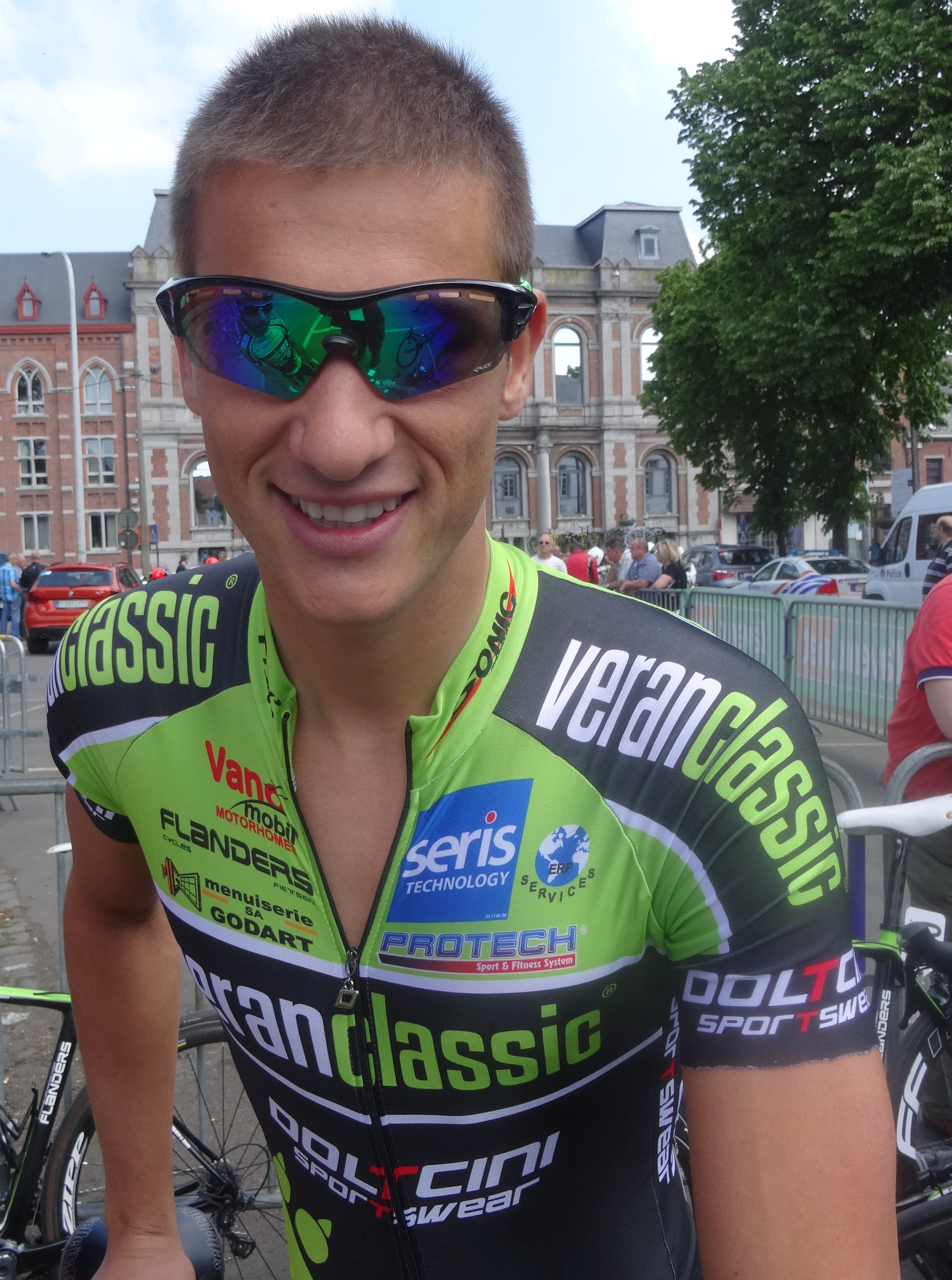
- Stallaert in 2014.

Personal information
- Full name: Joeri Stallaert
- Born: 25 January 1991 (age 35) Denderbelle, Belgium
- Height: 1.81 m (5 ft 11 in)
- Weight: 70 kg (154 lb)

Cycling career
- Sport: Cycling
- Current team: Retired
- Discipline: Road
- Role: Rider

Amateur teams
- 2010: Jong Vlaanderen–Bauknecht (stagiaire)
- 2020–2021: Hubo–Titan Cargo CT

Professional teams
- 2011–2013: Landbouwkrediet
- 2014: Veranclassic–Doltcini
- 2015–2017: Cibel
- 2018: Team Vorarlberg Santic
- 2019: Corendon–Circus
- 2020: Team Vorarlberg Santic

Joeri Stallaert (born 25 January 1991 in Denderbelle) is a Belgian former professional cyclist, who rode professionally between 2011 and 2020 for five different teams.

== Major results ==
2009
1st Gent–Menen
1st Ronde van Vlaanderen Junioren
3rd Omloop Mandel-Leie-Schelde Juniors
2010
3rd Dwars door de Antwerpse Kempen
7th Paris–Tours Espoirs
2011
2nd Nationale Sluitingsprijs
4th Grote Prijs Stad Geel
8th Dwars door de Antwerpse Kempen
9th Kampioenschap van Vlaanderen
10th De Vlaamse Pijl
2012
1st Antwerpse Havenpijl
4th Omloop van het Houtland
7th Münsterland Giro
8th De Kustpijl
9th Schaal Sels
2014
4th Nationale Sluitingsprijs
4th Kernen Omloop Echt-Susteren
5th Ronde Pévéloise
7th Kampioenschap van Vlaanderen
7th Top Compétition
7th Grand Prix de la ville de Pérenchies
8th De Kustpijl
8th Grand Prix Pino Cerami
9th Grand Prix Criquielion
10th Handzame Classic
2015
2nd Omloop van het Waasland
4th De Kustpijl
5th Antwerpse Havenpijl
6th Grote Prijs Stad Zottegem
7th Handzame Classic
9th Grand Prix Criquielion
10th Dwars door de Vlaamse Ardennen
10th Schaal Sels
2016
2nd Ronde van Overijssel
4th Dwars door de Vlaamse Ardennen
5th Gooikse Pijl
8th Schaal Sels
9th Grote Prijs Jef Scherens
9th De Kustpijl
9th Kampioenschap van Vlaanderen
10th Grote Prijs Stad Sint-Niklaas
2017
1st Stage 1 Kreiz Breizh Elites
2nd Overall Paris–Arras Tour
2nd Internationale Wielertrofee Jong Maar Moedig
2nd Grote Prijs Stad Zottegem
3rd Nokere Koerse
3rd Heistse Pijl
4th Gooikse Pijl
5th Grote Prijs Jef Scherens
6th Ronde van Limburg
8th Omloop van het Houtland
10th Halle–Ingooigem
2018
7th Poreč Trophy
9th Omloop Mandel-Leie-Schelde
2019
4th Grote Prijs Stad Zottegem
7th Gooikse Pijl
