= Jimmy Janssens =

Belgian bicycle racer

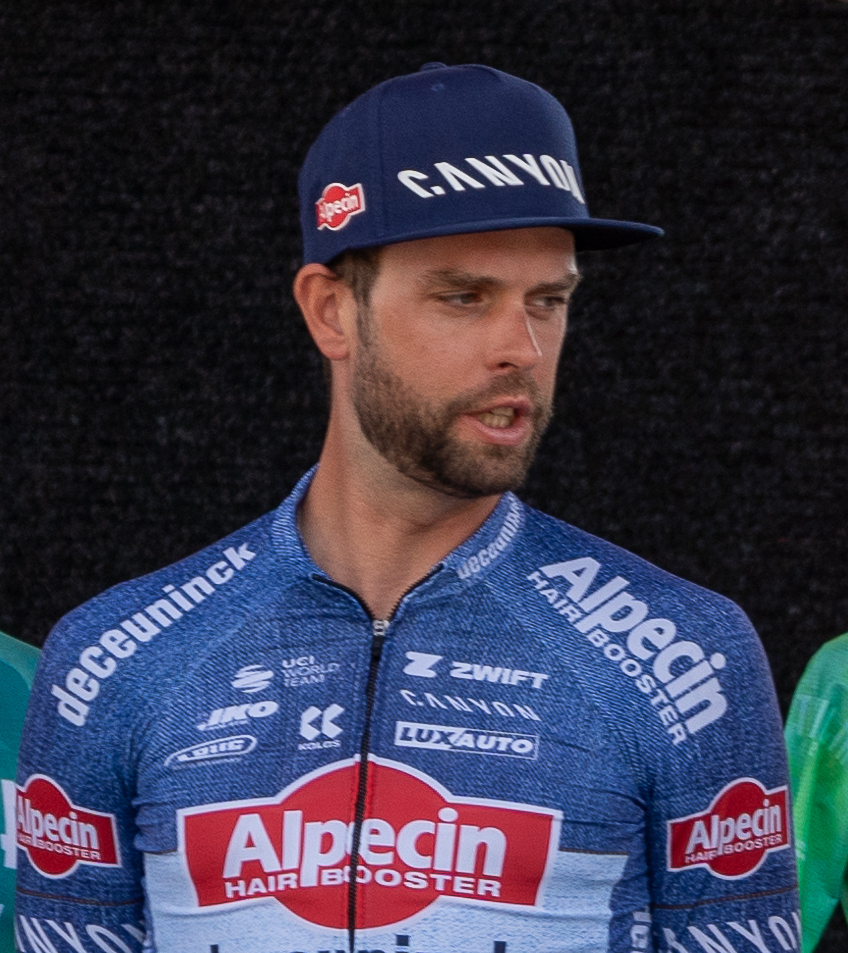
- Janssens at the 2024 Tour of the Basque Country

Personal information
- Full name: Jimmy Janssens
- Born: 30 May 1989 (age 37) Herentals, Belgium
- Height: 1.83 m (6 ft 0 in)
- Weight: 70 kg (154 lb)

Cycling career
- Sport: Cycling
- Discipline: Road
- Role: Rider

Amateur teams
- 2007: Dgm Voselaar
- 2008: Davo
- 2010: Bianchi–Nieuwe Hoop Tielen
- 2010: Palmans–Cras (stagiaire)
- 2011–2012: Omega Pharma–Lotto Davo

Professional teams
- 2013–2016: Team3M
- 2017–2018: Cibel–Cebon
- 2019–2025: Corendon–Circus

Jimmy Janssens (born 30 May 1989) is a former Belgian professional cyclist.

== Major results ==
2011
2nd Overall Vuelta a la Comunidad de Madrid Sub 23
5th Overall Cinturó de l'Empordà
2012
2nd Flèche Ardennaise
4th Overall Vuelta Ciclista a León
2014
4th Circuit de Wallonie
2015
5th Internationale Wielertrofee Jong Maar Moedig
2016
1st Mountains classification, Flèche du Sud
1st Mountains classification, Ronde de l'Oise
1st Mountains classification, Ster ZLM Toer
2017
4th Overall Tour de Savoie Mont-Blanc

1st Stage 1

8th Duo Normand (with Gianni Marchand)
9th Overall Kreiz Breizh Elites
10th Dwars door het Hageland
2018
2nd Flèche Ardennaise
3rd Overall Flèche du Sud

1st Stage 4

3rd Overall Tour de Taiwan

1st Mountains classification

3rd Volta Limburg Classic
3rd Druivenkoers Overijse
4th Tour de Vendée
5th Overall Kreiz Breizh Elites

1st Stage 3

5th Tour du Finistère
5th Duo Normand (with Gianni Marchand)
2019
2nd Memorial Rik Van Steenbergen
3rd Overall Étoile de Bessèges
3rd Overall Tour Alsace
6th Heistse Pijl
9th Overall Tour de la Provence
2020
9th Overall Étoile de Bessèges
2022
5th Paris–Camembert
2024
1st Mountains classification, Tour de Wallonie

=== Grand Tour general classification results timeline ===
Grand Tour	2021	2022	2023	2024
Giro d'Italia	65	—	—	84
Tour de France	—	—	—	
Vuelta a España	—	107	112	

Legend
—	Did not compete
DNF	Did not finish
