= Timothy Stevens (cyclist) =

Belgian cyclist

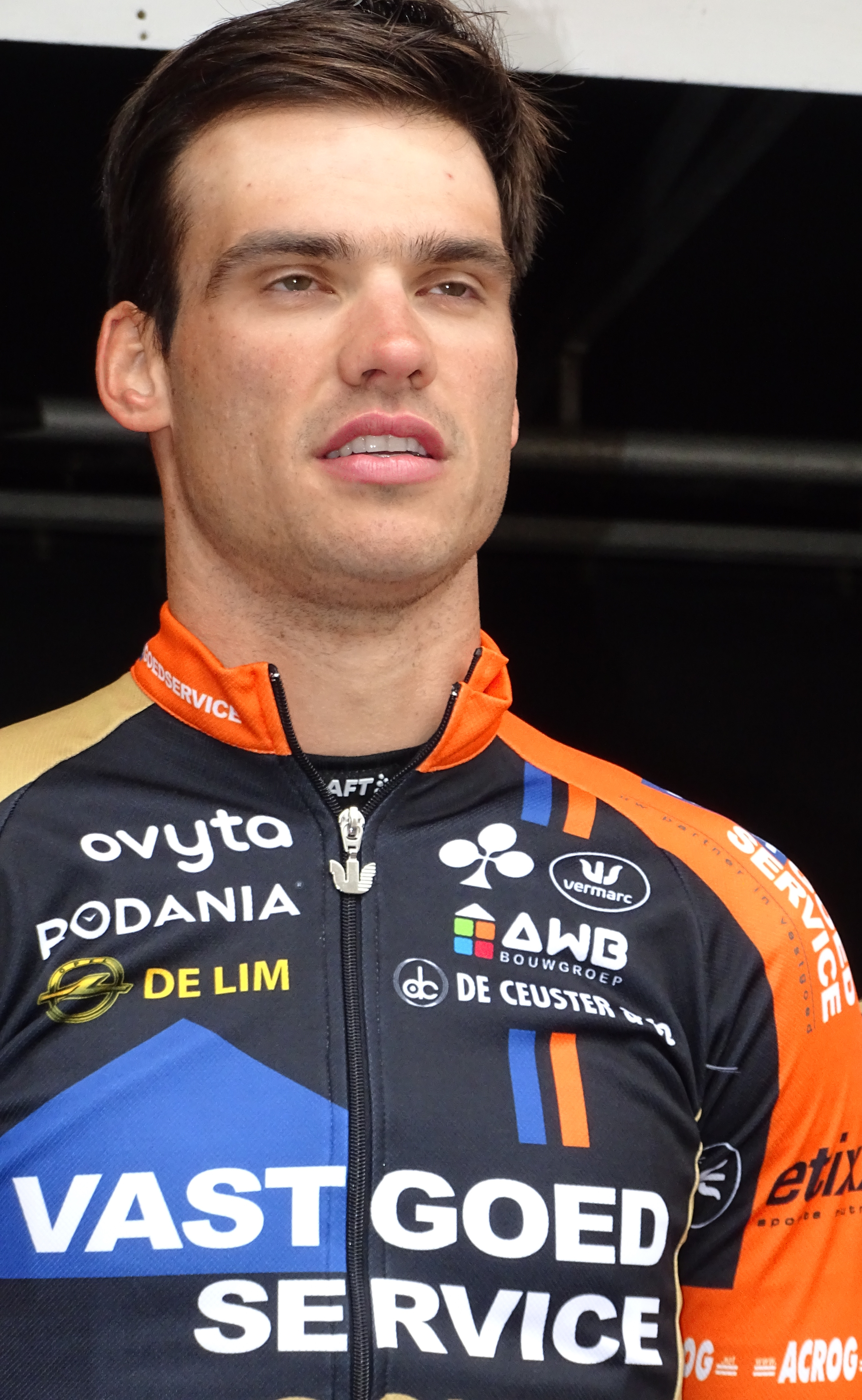
- Stevens in 2015

Personal information
- Born: 26 March 1989 (age 37) Sint-Truiden, Belgium

Cycling career
- Sport: Cycling
- Current team: ODB Cycling Team
- Discipline: Road
- Role: Rider

Amateur teams
- 2010–2012: PWS Eijssen
- 2010: Vacansoleil (stagiaire)
- 2012: Accent.jobs–Willems Veranda's (stagiaire)
- 2020–2021: Acrog–Tormans
- 2022–: ODB Cycling Team

Professional teams
- 2013–2014: Team3M
- 2015–2017: Vastgoedservice–Golden Palace
- 2018–2019: Cibel–Cebon

Timothy Stevens (born 26 March 1989 in Sint-Truiden) is a Belgian cyclist, who currently rides for Belgian amateur team ODB Cycling Team.

== Major results ==
2010
9th Dwars door het Hageland
2012
1st Dwars door het Hageland
9th Grote Prijs Stad Geel
2013
9th Gooikse Pijl
2014
6th Dorpenomloop Rucphen
2015
3rd Memorial Van Coningsloo
9th Ronde van Overijssel
9th Kernen Omloop Echt-Susteren
2016
2nd Grand Prix Criquielion
3rd Ronde van Overijssel
5th Nationale Sluitingsprijs
2017
1st Arno Wallaard Memorial
3rd Duo Normand (with David Boucher)
10th Grote Prijs Jean-Pierre Monseré
2018
1st De Kustpijl
2019
5th Grand Prix de la ville de Pérenchies
2022
6th GP Potterie Tienen
2023
7th Zepperen
7th Kortessem
