= Mathias De Witte =

Belgian cyclist

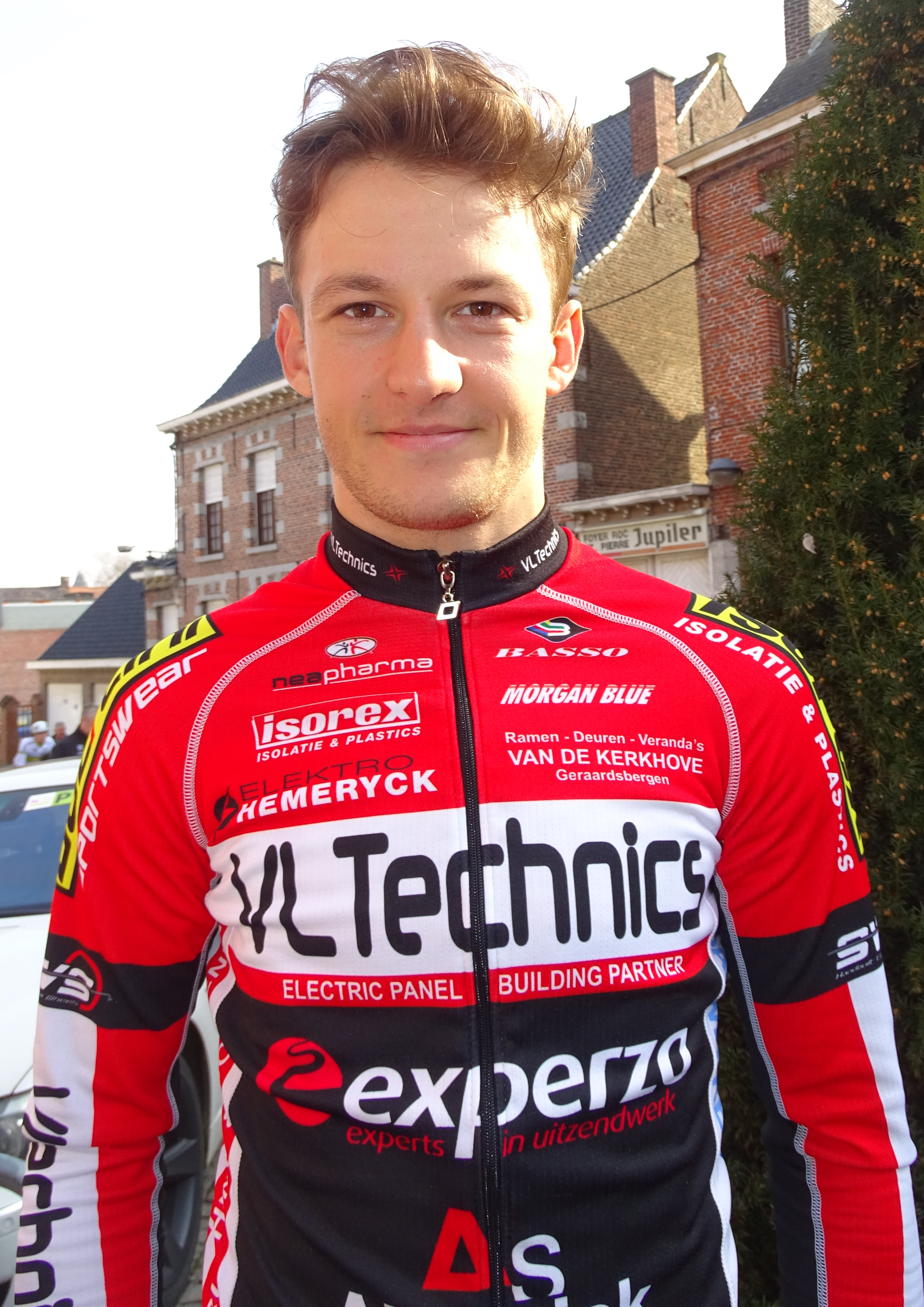
- De Witte in 2016.

Personal information
- Full name: Mathias De Witte
- Born: 29 March 1993 (age 33) Bruges, Belgium
- Height: 1.78 m (5 ft 10 in)
- Weight: 61 kg (134 lb)

Cycling career
- Sport: Cycling
- Current team: Van Rysel–Roubaix
- Discipline: Road
- Role: Rider

Amateur teams
- 2014: FCP–Glascentra
- 2015–2016: VL Technics–Experza–Abutriek

Professional teams
- 2017: Cibel–Cebon
- 2018: Vérandas Willems–Crelan
- 2019: Roompot–Charles
- 2020–: Natura4Ever–Roubaix–Lille Métropole

Mathias De Witte (born 29 March 1993 in Bruges) is a Belgian cyclist, who currently rides for UCI Continental team Van Rysel–Roubaix.

== Major results ==
2017
6th Tro-Bro Léon
6th Flèche Ardennaise
10th Nokere Koerse
2018
7th Ronde van Zeeland
