= 2016 Grote Prijs Jef Scherens =

Race details
- Dates: 21 August 2016
- Stages: 1
- Distance: 185.7 km (115.4 mi)
- Winning time: 4h 19' 34"

Results
| | Winner | Dimitri Claeys (BEL) |
| | Second | Pim Ligthart (NED) |
| | Third | Roman Maikin (RUS) |

The 2016 Grote Prijs Jef Scherens was the 50th edition of the Grote Prijs Jef Scherens cycle race and was held on 21 August 2016. The race started and finished in Leuven. The race was won by Dimitri Claeys.

== General classification ==
Final general classification

| Rank | Rider | Time |
|---|---|---|
| 1 | Dimitri Claeys (BEL) | 4h 19' 34" |
| 2 | Pim Ligthart (NED) | + 4" |
| 3 | Roman Maikin (RUS) | + 8" |
| 4 | Boris Vallée (BEL) | + 8" |
| 5 | Dion Smith (NZL) | + 8" |
| 6 | Sean De Bie (BEL) | + 8" |
| 7 | Arjen Livyns (BEL) | + 8" |
| 8 | Dries De Bondt (BEL) | + 8" |
| 9 | Joeri Stallaert (BEL) | + 8" |
| 10 | Gianni Vermeersch (BEL) | + 8" |
