= Dries De Bondt =

Belgian cyclist

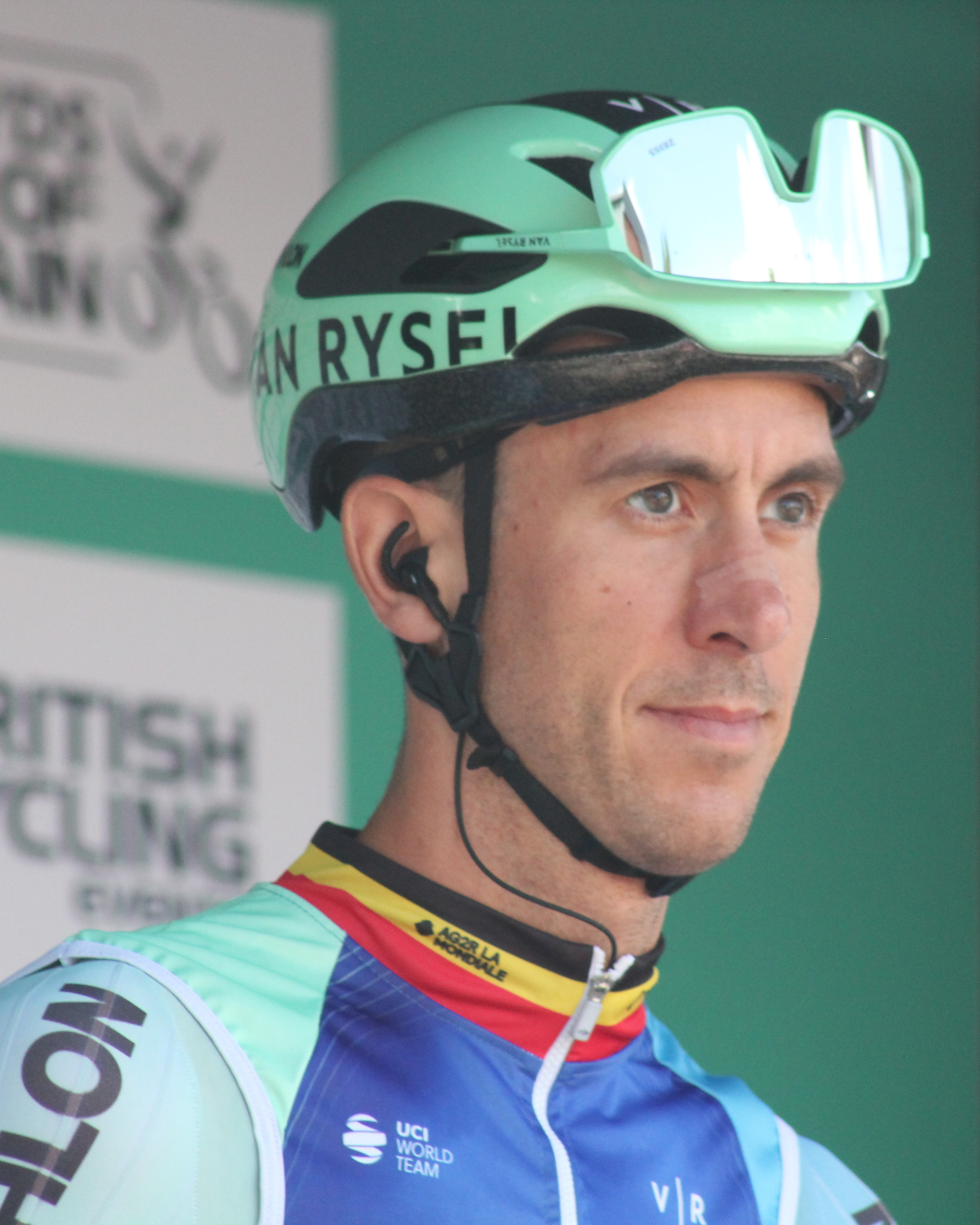
- De Bondt in 2025.

Personal information
- Full name: Dries De Bondt
- Born: 4 July 1991 (age 35) Bornem, Belgium
- Height: 1.84 m (6 ft 0 in)
- Weight: 72 kg (159 lb)

Cycling career
- Sport: Cycling
- Current team: Team Jayco–AlUla
- Discipline: Road
- Role: Rider
- Rider type: Rouleur, Breakaway specialist

Amateur team
- 2012–2013: Van Eyck Sport

Professional teams
- 2014: Josan–To Win
- 2015–2018: Verandas Willems
- 2019–2023: Corendon–Circus
- 2024–2025: Decathlon–AG2R La Mondiale
- 2026–: Team Jayco–AlUla

Major wins
- Grand Tours Giro d'Italia 1 individual stage (2022) One-day races and Classics National Road Race Championships (2020)

Dries De Bondt (born 4 July 1991, in Bornem) is a Belgian cyclist, who currently rides for UCI WorldTeam Team Jayco–AlUla.

== Major results ==
2014
5th Gooikse Pijl
2015
1st Grote Prijs Stad Sint-Niklaas
1st Stage 1 (TTT) Ronde van Midden-Nederland
4th Gooikse Pijl
8th Grand Prix Criquielion
9th Handzame Classic
2016 (1 pro win)
1st Road race, National Amateur Road Championships
1st Halle–Ingooigem
3rd Overall Belgian Road Cycling Cup
8th Overall Ronde de l'Oise

1st Stage 2

8th Heistse Pijl
8th Grote Prijs Jef Scherens
10th Ronde van Drenthe
10th Internationale Wielertrofee Jong Maar Moedig
2017
7th Grote Prijs Jean-Pierre Monseré
10th Famenne Ardenne Classic
2018
2nd Ronde van Drenthe
2nd Tacx Pro Classic
3rd Grote Prijs Marcel Kint
10th Schaal Sels
2019 (2)
1st Memorial Rik Van Steenbergen
1st Halle–Ingooigem
1st Grote Prijs Beeckman-De Caluwé
2nd Omloop van het Houtland
3rd Overall Tour de Wallonie
4th Heistse Pijl
4th Slag om Norg
8th Tour de l'Eurométropole
2020 (2)
1st Road race, National Road Championships
1st Mountains classification, Volta ao Algarve
1st Sprints classification, Tour de Wallonie
1st Stage 3 Étoile de Bessèges
2nd Druivenkoers Overijse
2021
Giro d'Italia

1st Sprints classification
1st Combativity classification

1st Sprints classification, Tour de Wallonie
9th Antwerp Port Epic
2022 (2)
Giro d'Italia

1st Stage 18
Combativity award Stage 11

1st Textielprijs Vichte
2nd Grand Prix de Denain
2nd Grote Prijs Jean-Pierre Monseré
3rd Le Samyn
6th Overall Tour of Belgium
7th Volta Limburg Classic
8th Ronde van Drenthe
9th Primus Classic
9th Egmont Cycling Race
2023 (2)
1st Antwerp Port Epic
1st Points classification, Tour of Guangxi
1st Textielprijs Vichte
8th Druivenkoers Overijse
2024
5th Dwars door Vlaanderen
2025
1st Nationale Sluitingsprijs
3rd Grand Prix de Denain
7th Overall Renewi Tour
7th Dwars door Vlaanderen

=== Grand Tour general classification results timeline ===
Grand Tour	2021	2022
Giro d'Italia	91	109
Tour de France	—	—
Vuelta a España	—	—

Legend
—	Did not compete
DNF	Did not finish
IP	In progress
