= Dwars door de Vlaamse Ardennen =

Race details
- Region: East Flanders
- English name: Through the Flemish Ardennes
- Discipline: Road
- Competition: UCI Europe Tour
- Type: One-day race
- Web site: www.dwarsdoordevlaamseardennen.be

History
- First edition: 2014
- Editions: 5 (as of 2018)
- First winner: Dimitri Claeys (BEL)
- Most wins: No repeat winners
- Most recent: Robby Cobbaert (BEL)

The Dwars door de Vlaamse Ardennen is a cycling race held annually in the province of East Flanders, Belgium. It is part of the UCI Europe Tour in category 1.2.

== Winners ==
| Year | Country | Rider | Team |
|---|---|---|---|
| 2014 | Belgium | Dimitri Claeys | VL Technics-Abutriek |
| 2015 | Belgium | Stijn Steels | Topsport Vlaanderen–Baloise |
| 2016 | Belgium | Timothy Dupont | Verandas Willems |
| 2017 | Australia | Cameron Meyer | Australia (national team) |
| 2018 | Belgium | Robby Cobbaert | Cibel-Cebon |
