= Baptiste Planckaert =

Belgian cyclist (born 1988)

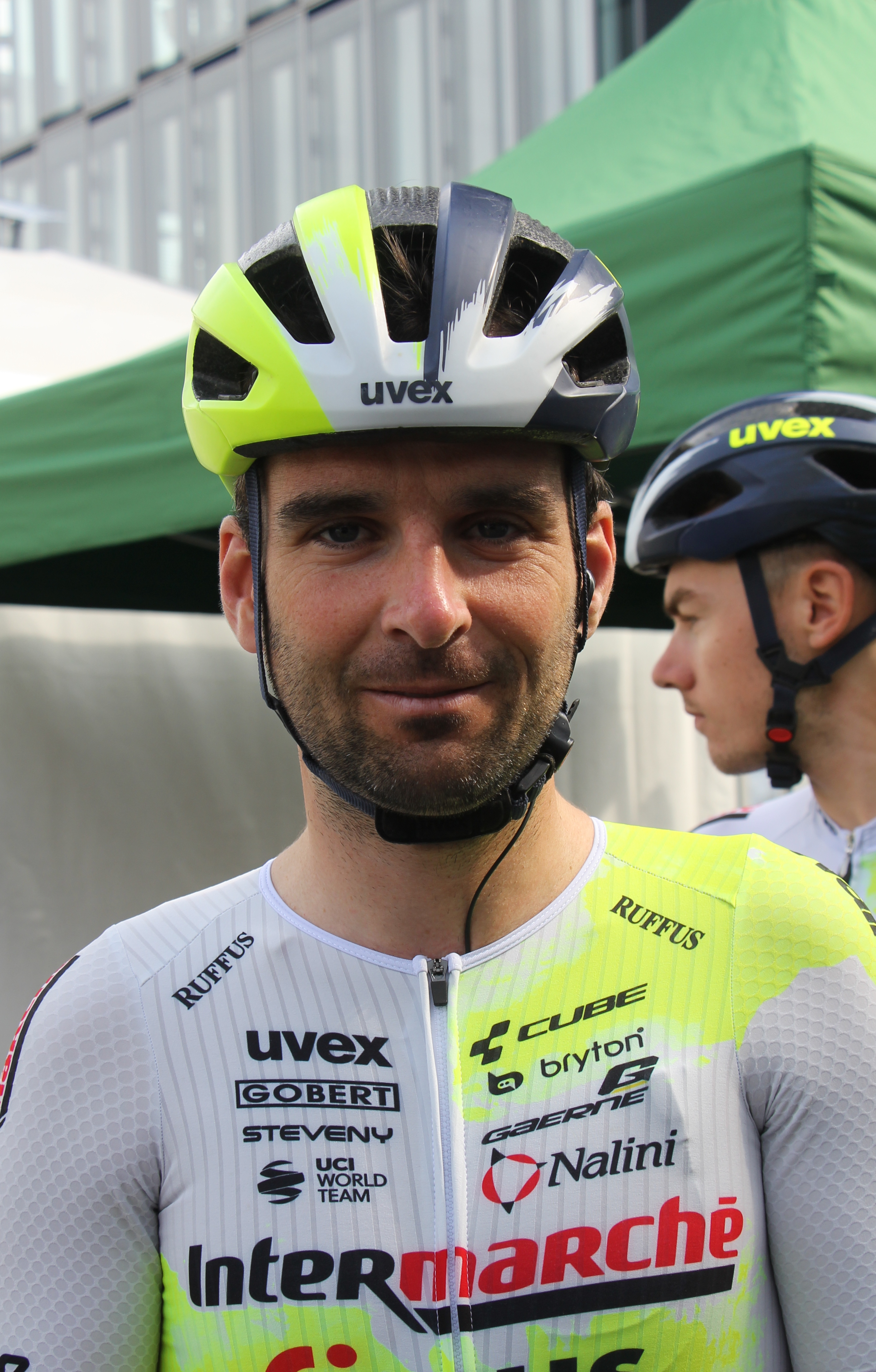
- Planckaert, Rund um Köln, 2023

Personal information
- Full name: Baptiste Planckaert
- Born: 28 September 1988 (age 38) Kortrijk, Belgium
- Height: 1.76 m (5 ft 9 in)
- Weight: 66 kg (146 lb)

Cycling career
- Sport: Cycling
- Current team: Van Rysel–Roubaix
- Discipline: Road
- Role: Rider

Amateur team
- 2009: Landbouwkrediet–Colnago (stagiaire)

Professional teams
- 2010–2013: Landbouwkrediet
- 2014–2015: Roubaix–Lille Métropole
- 2016: Wallonie-Bruxelles–Group Protect
- 2017–2018: Team Katusha–Alpecin
- 2019–2020: Wallonie Bruxelles
- 2021–2024: Intermarché–Wanty–Gobert Matériaux
- 2025–: Van Rysel–Roubaix

Baptiste Planckaert (born 28 September 1988) is a Belgian cyclist, who currently rides for UCI Continental team Van Rysel–Roubaix. In May 2018, he was named in the startlist for the Giro d'Italia, where he finished 116th overall.

== Personal life ==
Planckaert, along with his brothers Edward Planckaert and Emiel Planckaert, are all professional cyclists.

== Major results ==
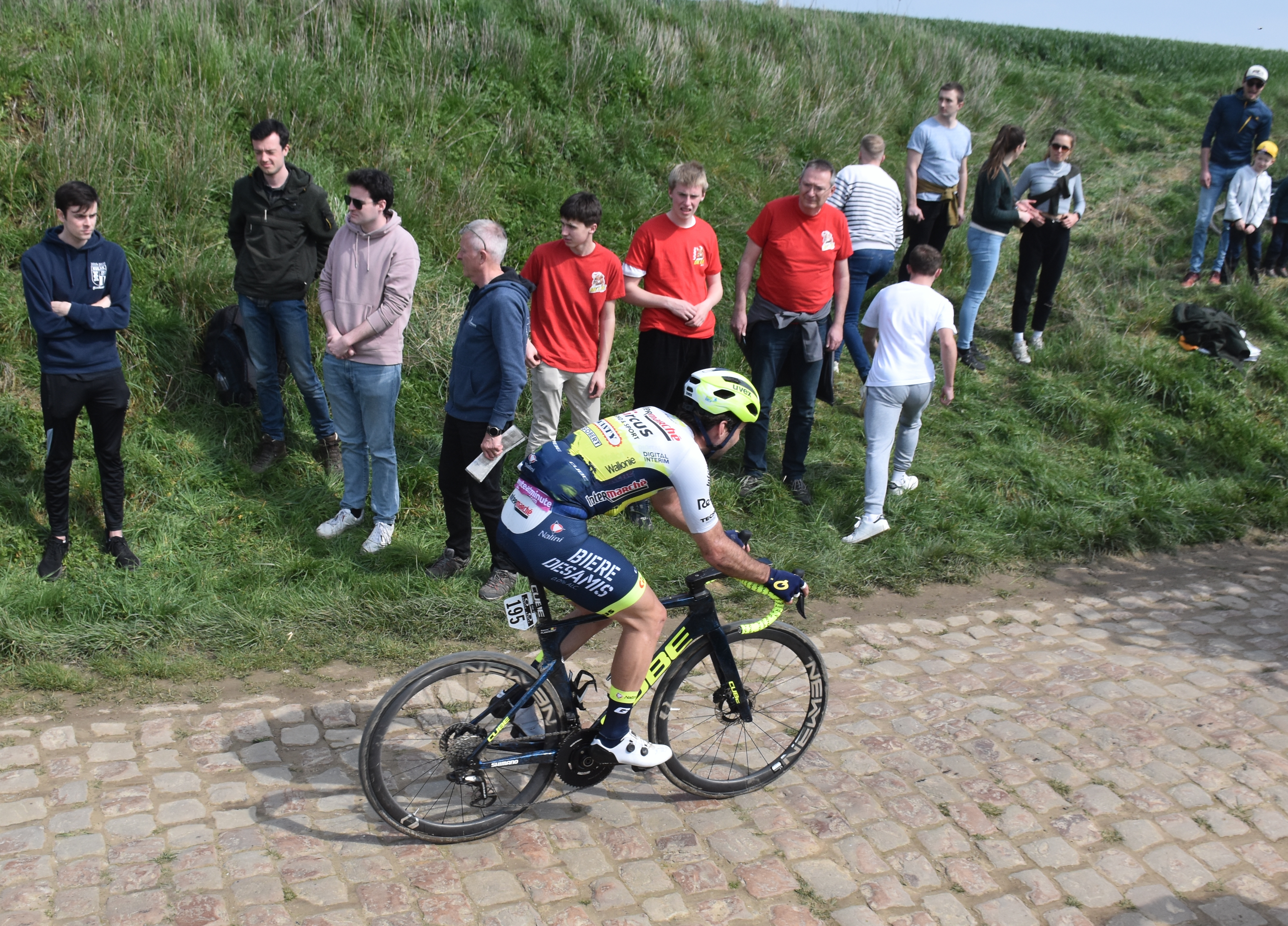
Paris-Roubaix 2023 - Secteur pavé de Quiévy à Saint-Python - N° 195 Baptiste Planckaert.

2005
4th Paris–Roubaix Juniors
2006
10th Paris–Roubaix Juniors
2009
1st Stage 3 Le Triptyque des Monts et Châteaux
2nd Kattekoers
3rd Brussels-Opwijk
4th Grand Prix Criquielion
7th Grote 1-MeiPrijs
8th De Vlaamse Pijl
9th La Côte Picarde
2010
2nd Omloop van het Waasland
3rd De Vlaamse Pijl
5th Tour de Vendée
2011
8th Grote Prijs Stad Zottegem
2012
3rd Grote 1-MeiPrijs
3rd Grote Prijs Jean-Pierre Monseré
4th Grand Prix de Fourmies
8th Châteauroux Classic
10th Nokere Koerse
2013
2nd Kampioenschap van Vlaanderen
3rd Schaal Sels
6th Gooikse Pijl
6th De Kustpijl
2014
2nd Grand Prix d'Ouverture La Marseillaise
2nd Ronde Pévéloise
4th Paris–Bourges
5th Halle–Ingooigem
6th Grand Prix de Fourmies
7th Châteauroux Classic
8th Ronde van Limburg
10th Grand Prix de la ville de Pérenchies
10th Grand Prix d'Isbergues
2015
1st Kattekoers
1st Points classification Tour du Limousin
3rd Cholet-Pays de Loire
4th Grand Prix de Fourmies
4th Grand Prix d'Isbergues
4th Grand Prix d'Ouverture La Marseillaise
4th La Roue Tourangelle
5th Overall Tour du Haut Var
5th Overall Circuit des Ardennes

1st Points classification

5th Tour de Vendée
5th Nokere Koerse
5th Boucles de l'Aulne
7th Polynormande
7th Route Adélie
9th Le Samyn
2016
1st Overall UCI Europe Tour
1st Overall Tour de Normandie

1st Stage 5

1st Tour du Finistère
1st Polynormande
1st Stage 4 Czech Cycling Tour
1st Mountains classification Tour de Wallonie
2nd Overall Circuit des Ardennes

1st Points classification

2nd Tour du Doubs
2nd Cholet-Pays de Loire
2nd Paris–Troyes
3rd Grand Prix d'Isbergues
3rd Grand Prix d'Ouverture La Marseillaise
4th Grand Prix de Denain
4th Nokere Koerse
4th Grand Prix de la Somme
4th Internationale Wielertrofee Jong Maar Moedig
4th Omloop Mandel-Leie-Schelde
4th Schaal Sels
5th Overall Tour of Belgium

1st Points classification

5th Paris–Camembert
5th La Roue Tourangelle
5th Tour de Vendée
6th Ronde van Limburg
6th Grote Prijs Stad Zottegem
7th Tro-Bro Léon
7th Route Adélie
7th Grand Prix de Wallonie
7th Nationale Sluitingsprijs
10th Grand Prix de Fourmies
2017
4th Handzame Classic
5th Vuelta a Murcia
6th Clásica de Almería
6th Grand Prix of Aargau Canton
6th Omloop Eurometropool
8th Down Under Classic
9th Tour de l'Eurométropole
10th Kuurne–Brussels–Kuurne
2018
4th Three Days of Bruges–De Panne
6th Nokere Koerse
7th Kampioenschap van Vlaanderen
2019
1st Rund um Köln
1st Combativity classification BinckBank Tour
2nd Tro-Bro Léon
2nd Circuit de Wallonie
2nd Famenne Ardenne Classic
3rd Tour du Finistère
4th Grote Prijs Marcel Kint
5th Elfstedenronde
6th Overall Tour de Luxembourg
6th Eschborn–Frankfurt
7th La Roue Tourangelle
8th Memorial Rik Van Steenbergen
9th Brussels Cycling Classic
10th Kampioenschap van Vlaanderen
2020
1st Mountains classification Tour de Luxembourg
3rd Antwerp Port Epic
9th Tour du Doubs
2021
3rd Tro-Bro Léon
5th Tour du Finistère
6th Kampioenschap van Vlaanderen
8th Grand Prix de Denain
10th Grand Prix de Fourmies
2022
5th Overall Four Days of Dunkirk
6th Heistse Pijl

=== Grand Tour general classification results timeline ===
Grand Tour	2018
Giro d'Italia	116
Tour de France	—
Vuelta a España	—

Legend
—	Did not compete
DNF	Did not finish
