= Sean De Bie =

Belgian cyclist

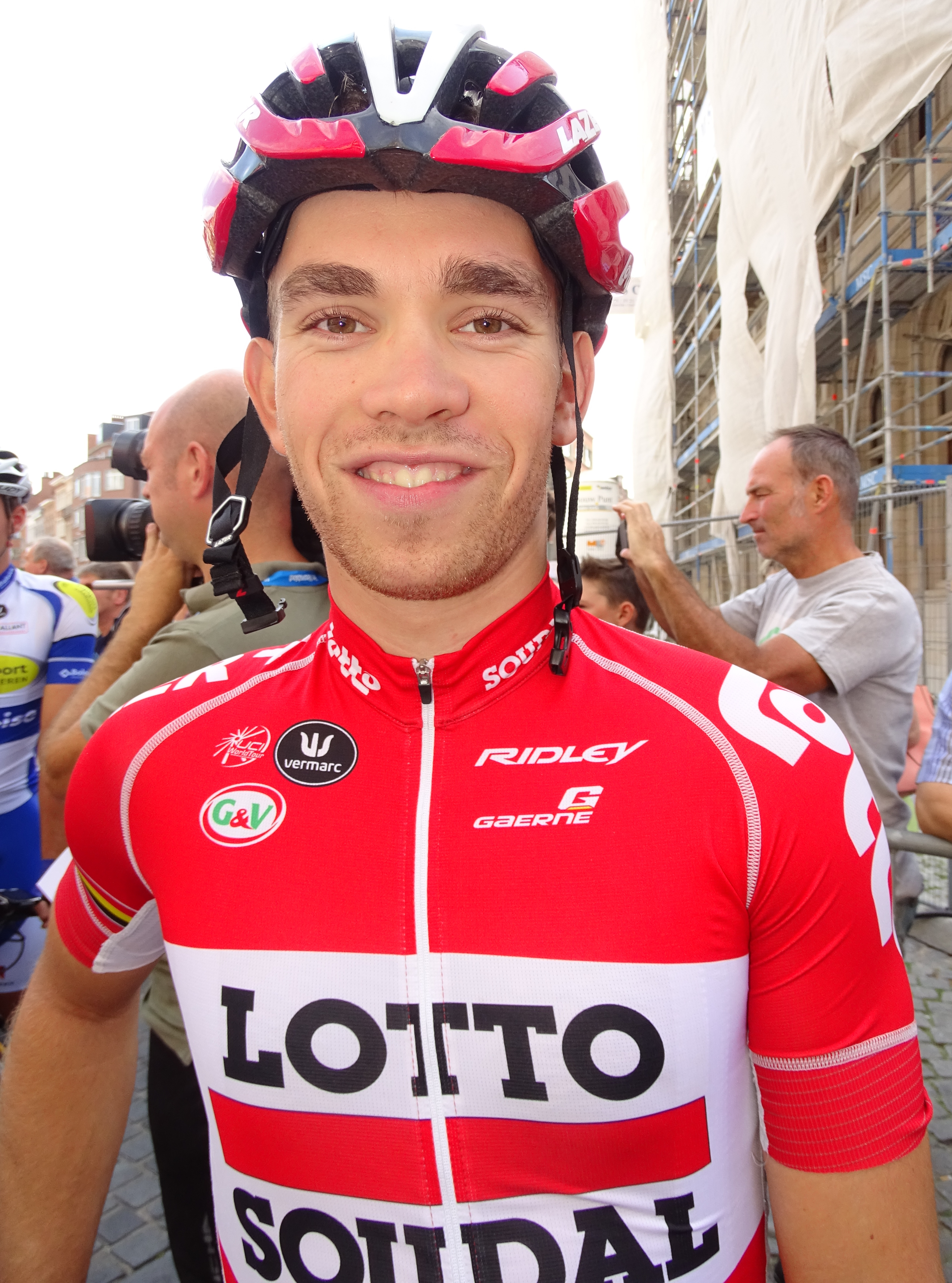
- De Bie in 2015.

Personal information
- Full name: Sean De Bie
- Born: 3 October 1991 (age 35) Bonheiden, Belgium
- Height: 1.73 m (5 ft 8 in)
- Weight: 65 kg (143 lb; 10.2 st)

Cycling career
- Sport: Cycling
- Current team: Retired
- Disciplines: Road; Cyclo-cross
- Role: Rider

Amateur team
- 2010–2012: PWS Eijssen

Professional teams
- 2013: Leopard–Trek Continental Team
- 2014–2017: Lotto–Belisol
- 2018: Vérandas Willems–Crelan
- 2019: Roompot–Charles
- 2020–2021: Bingoal–Wallonie Bruxelles

Major wins
- Stage races Driedaagse van West-Vlaanderen (2016) One-day races and Classics GP Impanis-Van Petegem (2015)
Medal record
Representing Belgium
Men's road bicycle racing
European Championships
Gold medal – first place	2013 Olomouc	Under-23 road race

Sean De Bie (born 3 October 1991 in Bonheiden) is a Belgian former racing cyclist, who rode professionally between 2013 and 2021 for five different teams. De Bie is the son of former cyclist Eddy De Bie and a nephew of former cyclist Danny De Bie, and was named in the start list for the 2016 Giro d'Italia.

== Major results ==
2009
1st Stage 1 Liège–La Gleize
1st Stage 2 3 Giorni Orobica
3rd Road race, National Junior Road Championships
4th Paris–Roubaix Juniors
6th Road race, UCI Juniors World Championships
10th Chrono des Nations Juniors
2010
4th Omloop Het Nieuwsblad U23
2011
1st Stage 1 Toscana-Terra di Ciclismo
2nd Grand Prix de Waregem
3rd De Vlaamse Pijl
4th Ronde van Midden-Nederland
2012
2nd Ronde Van Vlaanderen Beloften
4th La Côte Picarde
5th Overall Le Triptyque des Monts et Châteaux

1st Stage 1

5th Kattekoers
8th De Vlaamse Pijl
2013
1st Road race, UEC European Under-23 Road Championships
1st Stage 1 (TTT) Czech Cycling Tour
2nd La Côte Picarde
2nd Ronde Pévéloise
3rd Arno Wallaard Memorial
4th Ronde Van Vlaanderen Beloften
2014
6th Overall Danmark Rundt
2015
1st Grand Prix Impanis-Van Petegem
1st Stage 4 Tour de Luxembourg
3rd Druivenkoers Overijse
5th Road race, National Road Championships
5th Overall Three Days of De Panne
5th Grote Prijs Stad Zottegem
2016
1st Overall Driedaagse van West-Vlaanderen

1st Young rider classification

2nd Overall Ster ZLM Toer
5th Heistse Pijl
6th Grote Prijs Jef Scherens
9th Dwars door het Hageland
2018
3rd Halle–Ingooigem
4th GP Industria & Artigianato di Larciano
4th Grand Prix of Aargau Canton
5th Eschborn–Frankfurt
5th Dwars door het Hageland
8th Overall Étoile de Bessèges

1st Stage 4

8th Nokere Koerse
9th Kampioenschap van Vlaanderen
10th Rund um Köln
10th Grote Prijs Jef Scherens
2020
5th Druivenkoers Overijse
2021
2nd Tour du Finistère

=== Grand Tour general classification results timeline ===
Grand Tour	2016	2017
Giro d'Italia	108	DNF
Tour de France	—	—
Vuelta a España	—	—

Legend
—	Did not compete
DNF	Did not finish
