= Jelle Mannaerts =

Belgian cyclist

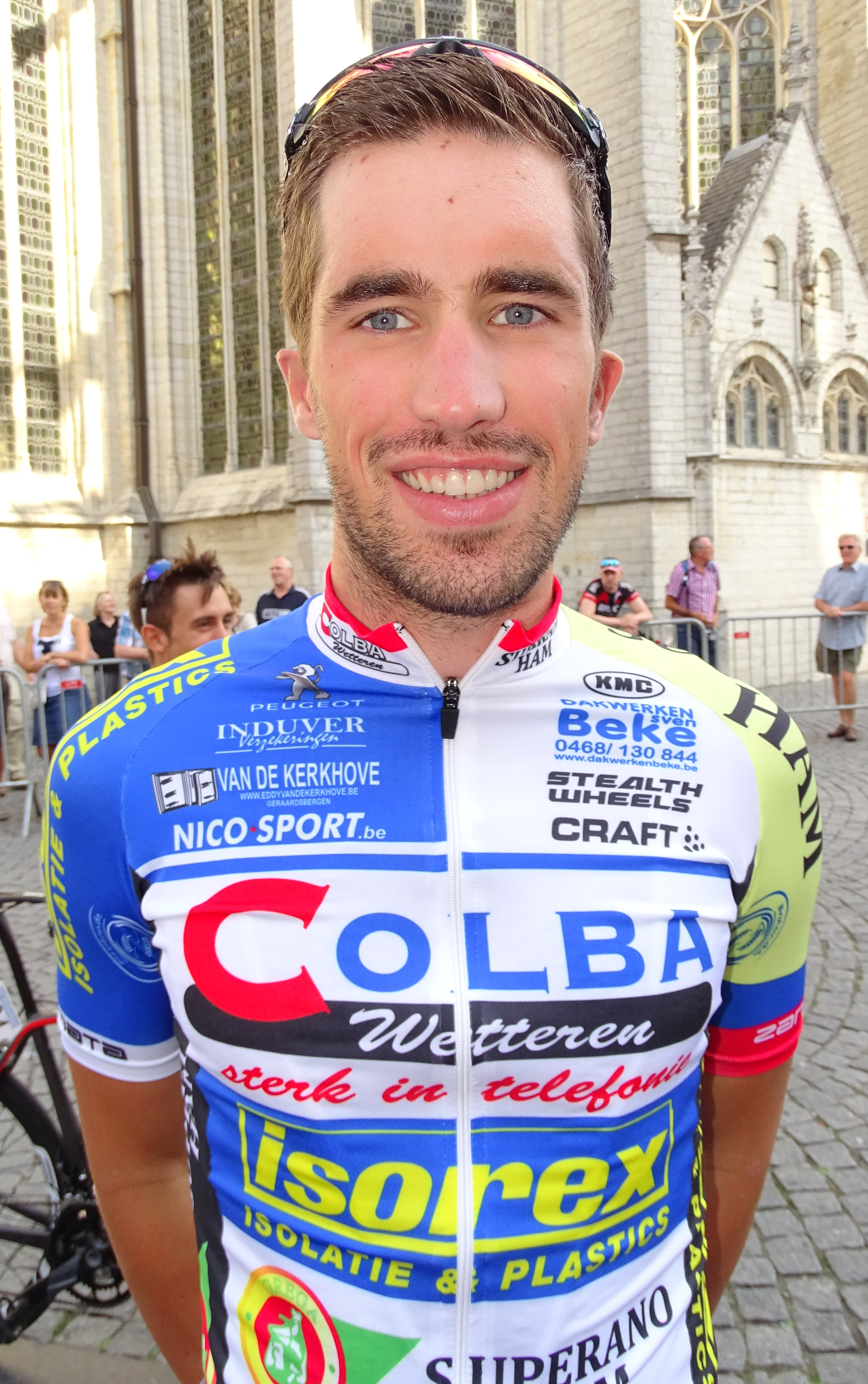
- Mannaerts in 2015

Personal information
- Full name: Jelle Mannaerts
- Born: 14 October 1991 (age 35) Lommel, Belgium
- Height: 1.83 m (6 ft 0 in)
- Weight: 73 kg (161 lb)

Cycling career
- Sport: Cycling
- Current team: Hubo–Titan Cargo
- Discipline: Road
- Role: Rider
- Rider type: Sprinter

Amateur teams
- 2010: Davo–Lotto–Davitamon
- 2011–2013: Rock Werchter
- 2019–: Hubo–Titan Cargo

Professional teams
- 2014: Verandas Willems
- 2015–2019: Colba–Superano Ham

Jelle Mannaerts (born 14 October 1991 in Lommel) is a Belgian cyclist, who currently rides for Belgian amateur team Hubo–Titan Cargo.

== Major results ==
2014
7th Handzame Classic
2015
6th Nationale Sluitingsprijs
2016
9th Handzame Classic
2017
2nd De Kustpijl
6th Nationale Sluitingsprijs
9th Handzame Classic
9th Omloop van het Houtland
2018
3rd Tro-Bro Léon
2019
7th Overall Tour de Normandie
