= Dimitri Claeys =

Belgian road cyclist

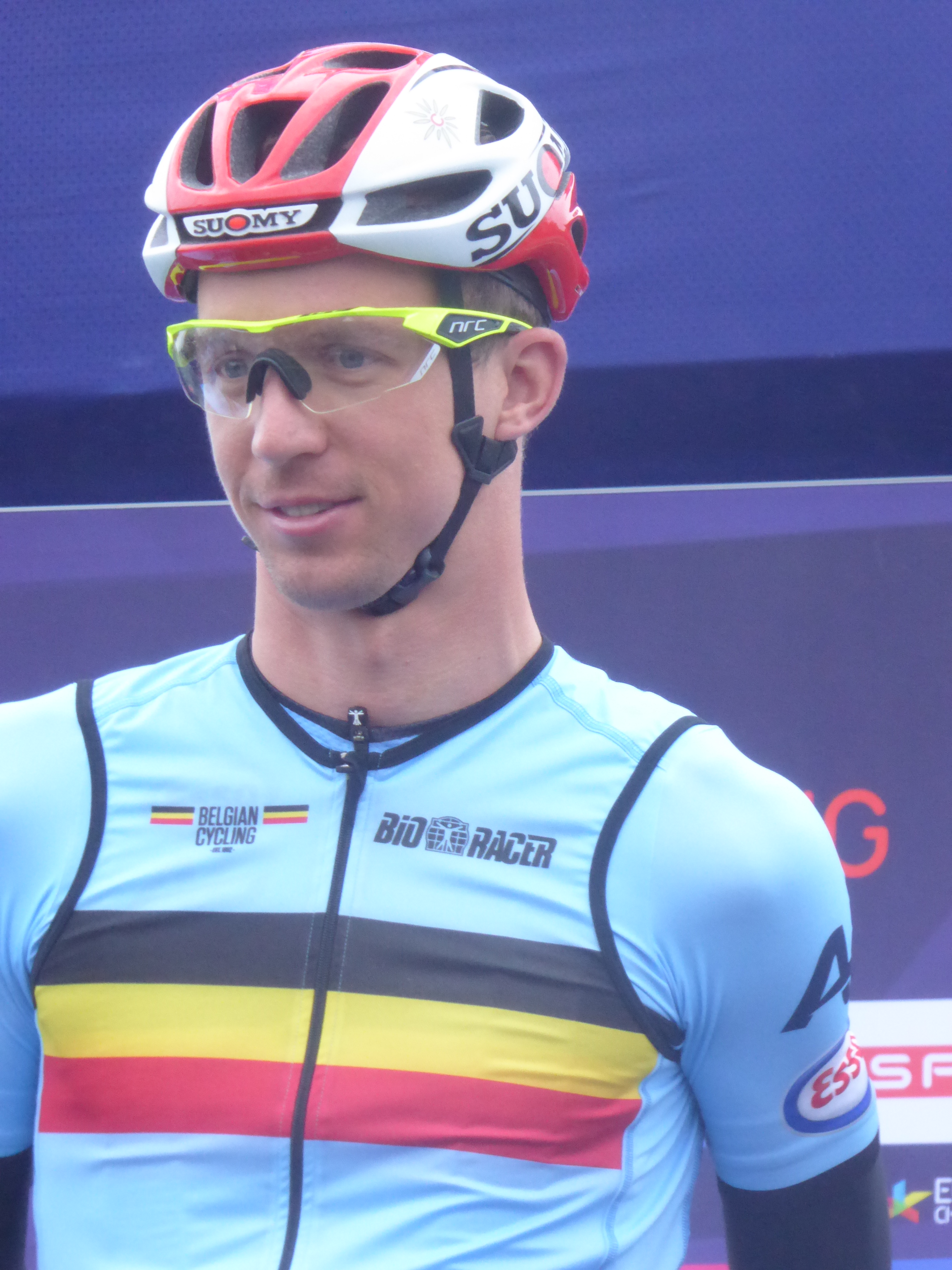
- Claeys at the 2018 European Road Cycling Championships

Personal information
- Full name: Dimitri Claeys
- Born: 18 June 1987 (age 39) Sint-Amandsberg, Belgium
- Height: 1.89 m (6 ft 2 1/2 in)
- Weight: 77 kg (170 lb; 12 st 2 lb)

Cycling career
- Sport: Cycling
- Current team: Intermarché–Wanty
- Discipline: Road
- Role: Rider (retired); Directeur sportif
- Rider type: Classics rider; Domestique

Amateur teams
- 2006: Unibet–Davo
- 2012: Geofco–Ville d'Alger
- 2012: Van Der Vurst–Hiko
- 2013–2014: VL Technics–Abutriek

Professional teams
- 2007–2009: Davitamon–Win for Life–Jong Vlaanderen
- 2010–2011: Team NetApp
- 2015: Verandas Willems
- 2016: Wanty–Groupe Gobert
- 2017–2020: Cofidis
- 2021: Team Qhubeka Assos
- 2022: Intermarché–Wanty–Gobert Matériaux

Managerial team
- 2023–: Intermarché–Circus–Wanty

Major wins
- Stage races Four Days of Dunkirk (2018)

Dimitri Claeys (born 18 June 1987) is a Belgian former cyclist, who competed as a professional from 2007 to 2022 for six different teams. During his professional career, Claeys took five victories – including the general classification at the 2018 Four Days of Dunkirk, as well as the 2016 Grote Prijs Jef Scherens and 2019 Famenne Ardenne Classic one-day races.

Following his retirement as a rider, Claeys now works as a directeur sportif for UCI WorldTeam Intermarché–Wanty.

== Major results ==
2007
1st Stage 5 (TTT) Volta a Lleida
5th Overall Giro delle Regioni
8th Liège–Bastogne–Liège U23
2008
1st Road race, National Under-23 Road Championships
7th Grand Prix des Marbriers
2009
1st Road race, National Under-23 Road Championships
9th Flèche Ardennaise
2010
3rd Grand Prix des Marbriers
7th Ronde Pévéloise
9th Overall Szlakiem Grodów Piastowskich
9th Overall Okolo Slovenska
2012
3rd Omloop Het Nieuwsblad U23
6th Circuit de Wallonie
8th Zellik–Galmaarden
2013
1st Omloop Het Nieuwsblad U23
3rd Flèche Ardennaise
2014
1st Dwars door de Vlaamse Ardennen
1st Omloop Het Nieuwsblad U23
2nd Circuit de Wallonie
2015
1st Overall Tour de Normandie

1st Points classification
1st Stage 2

1st Internationale Wielertrofee Jong Maar Moedig
1st Grand Prix de la ville de Pérenchies
1st Stage 4 Tour of Croatia
2nd Grand Prix Impanis-Van Petegem
2nd Ster van Zwolle
2nd Ronde van Limburg
2nd Dwars door de Vlaamse Ardennen
2nd Grote Prijs Jef Scherens
2nd Omloop Het Nieuwsblad U23
2nd Duo Normand (with Olivier Pardini)
4th Overall Paris–Arras Tour

1st Stage 1 (TTT)

4th Kattekoers
5th Circuit de Wallonie
7th Overall Circuit des Ardennes
7th Flèche Ardennaise
2016
1st Grote Prijs Jef Scherens
1st Stage 3 Tour de Wallonie
2nd Internationale Wielertrofee Jong Maar Moedig
4th Grand Prix La Marseillaise
4th Druivenkoers Overijse
6th Halle–Ingooigem
8th Tro-Bro Léon
9th Tour of Flanders
9th Polynormande
10th Grand Prix Pino Cerami
2017
5th Dwars door het Hageland
5th Tacx Pro Classic
7th Polynormande
2018
1st Overall Four Days of Dunkirk
2nd Grand Prix de Wallonie
5th Tacx Pro Classic
10th Grand Prix La Marseillaise
2019
1st Famenne Ardenne Classic
8th Overall Four Days of Dunkirk
9th Polynormande
2020
6th Tour of Flanders
2021
8th Le Samyn
10th Grand Prix de Wallonie

=== Grand Tour general classification results timeline ===
Claeys rode a Grand Tour for the first time, when he was named in the start list for the 2017 Tour de France.

Grand Tour	2017	2018	2019	2020	2021
Giro d'Italia	—	—	—	—	—
Tour de France	163	130	—	—	—
Vuelta a España	—	—	—	—	105

Legend
—	Did not compete
DNF	Did not finish
