= Jesper Asselman =

Dutch cyclist (born 1990)

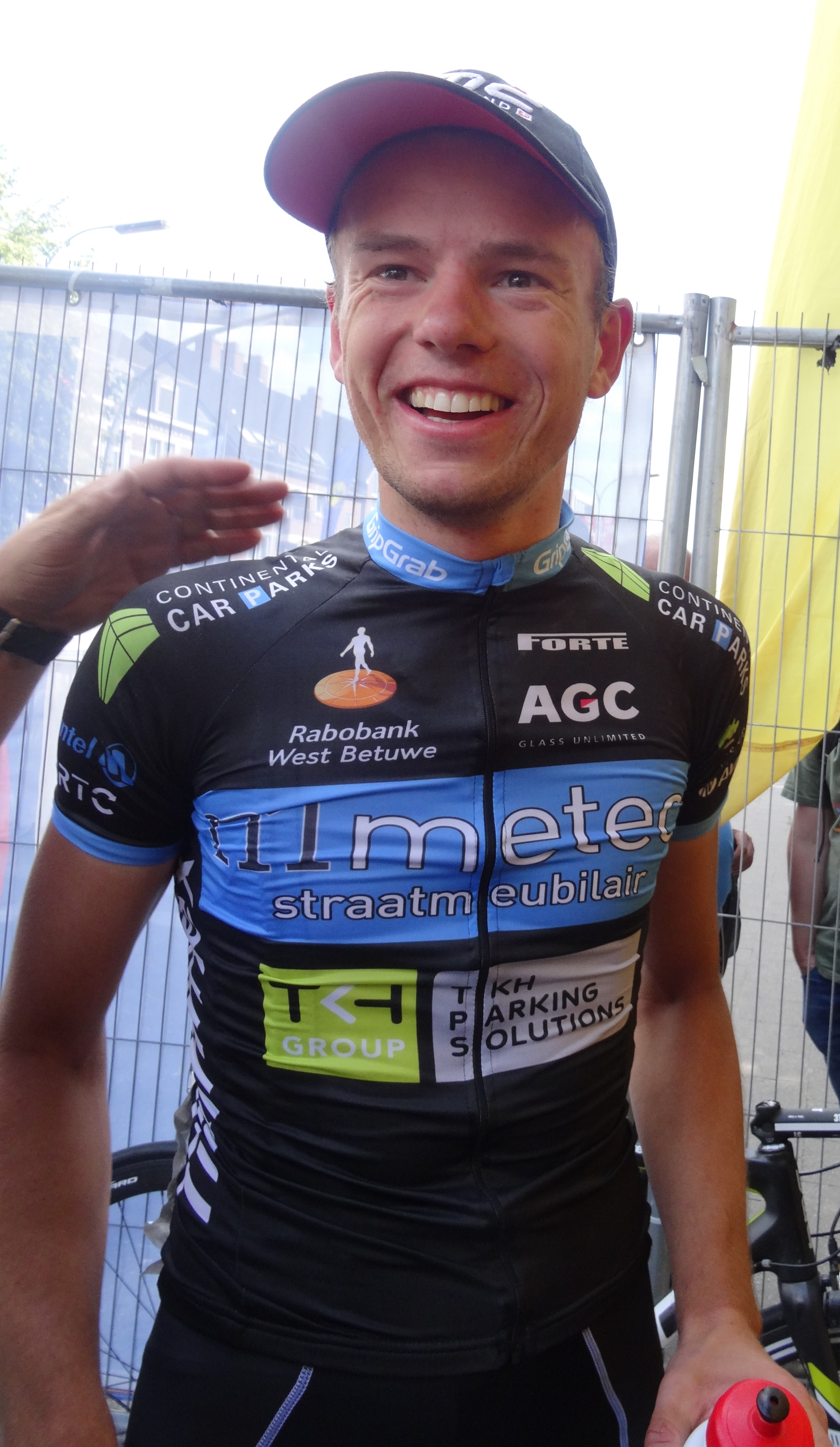
- Asselman in 2014

Personal information
- Full name: Jesper Asselman
- Born: 12 March 1990 (age 36) Delft, Netherlands
- Height: 1.84 m (6 ft 0 in)
- Weight: 69 kg (152 lb)

Cycling career
- Sport: Cycling
- Current team: Retired
- Discipline: Road
- Role: Rider
- Rider type: Classics rider

Professional teams
- 2009–2010: Van Vliet–EBH Elshof
- 2011: Rabobank Continental Team
- 2012: Team Raiko–Stölting
- 2013–2014: Metec–TKH
- 2015–2019: Team Roompot
- 2020: Metec–TKH

Jesper Asselman (born 12 March 1990) is a Dutch former professional racing cyclist, who rode professionally between 2009 and 2020, for the Van Vliet–EBH Elshof, Rabobank Continental Team, Team Raiko–Stölting, Roompot–Charles and Metec–TKH teams. During the 2015 Eneco Tour, and after spending two consecutive days in the breakaway and winning bonus seconds, Asselman moved into the overall lead of the race.

== Major results ==
2010
7th Dwars door het Hageland
2011
1st Stage 2b (TTT) Vuelta Ciclista a León
2nd Ronde van Overijssel
5th Ronde van Midden-Nederland
9th Münsterland Giro
2012
2nd Arno Wallaard Memorial
7th Eschborn–Frankfurt Under–23
2013
1st Scratch, National Track Championships
5th Ronde van Midden-Nederland
7th Ronde van Limburg
2014
3rd Overall Olympia's Tour
6th Overall World Ports Classic
6th Overall Okolo Slovenska

1st Stage 1 (TTT)

6th Kernen Omloop Echt-Susteren
7th Grote Prijs Stad Zottegem
8th Grand Prix Südkärnten
2015
4th Ronde van Drenthe
4th Ronde van Limburg
2016
1st Ronde van Drenthe
2017
2nd Slag om Norg
6th Le Samyn
6th Dwars door West-Vlaanderen
2019
1st Stage 1 Tour de Yorkshire
9th Le Samyn
9th Elfstedenronde
10th Veenendaal–Veenendaal Classic
10th Antwerp Port Epic
