= Pauwels Sauzen–Vastgoedservice =

Team information
- UCI code: PSV
- Registered: Belgium
- Founded: 2014
- Discipline: Road
- Status: UCI Continental

Team name history
- 2014–2015 2016 2017–2019: Vastgoedservice–Golden Palace; Crelan–Vastgoedservice; Pauwels Sauzen–Vastgoedservice
Pauwels Sauzen–Vastgoedservice jersey
Jersey

Pauwels Sauzen–Vastgoedservice was a Belgian UCI Continental team founded in 2014, which disbanded after the 2019 season after merging with Pauwels Sauzen–Bingoal. It participated in UCI Continental Circuits races.

== Team roster ==
Rider	Date of birth
Jens Adams (BEL)	5 June 1992 (age 34)
Michael Boroš (CZE)	9 August 1992 (age 34)
Jelle Camps (BEL)	5 April 1999 (age 27)
Johan Jacobs (SWI)	1 March 1997 (age 29)
Lander Loockx (BEL)	25 April 1997 (age 29)

Rider	Date of birth
Yannick Peeters (BEL)	15 November 1996 (age 29)
Seppe Rombouts (BEL)	14 May 1998 (age 28)
Jelle Schuermans (BEL)	3 December 1996 (age 29)
Florian Vermeersch (BEL)	12 March 1999 (age 27)
Sieben Wouters (NED)	23 June 1996 (age 30)

== Major wins ==
2014
Grand Prix Criquielion, Kevin Peeters
Memorial Philippe Van Coningsloo, Rob Ruijgh
