= Team Metalced =

Belgian cycling team

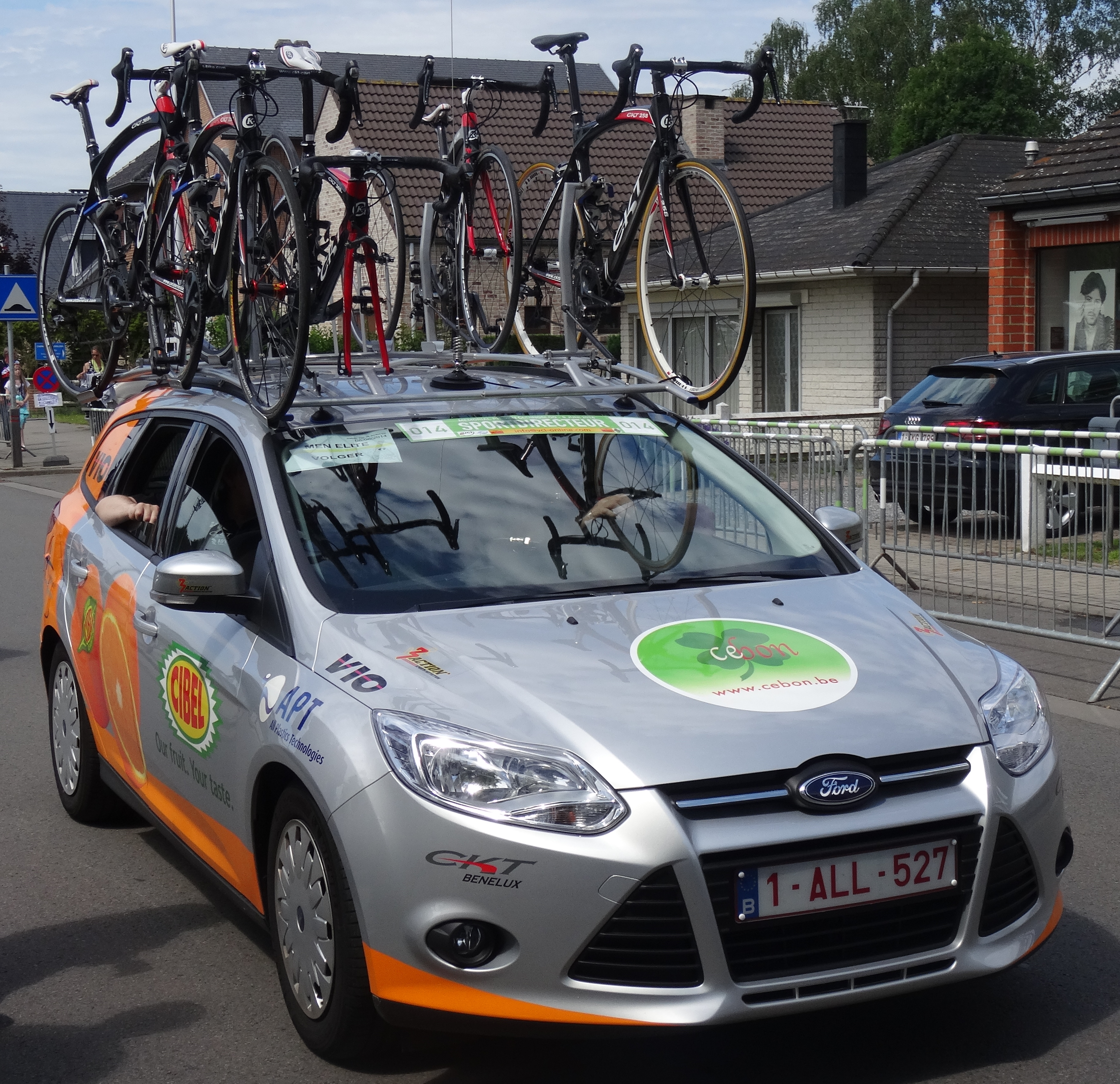

Team information
- UCI code: CIB (until 2019)
- Registered: Belgium
- Founded: 2009
- Discipline: Road
- Status: UCI Continental (2014–2019); Amateur (2020–present)
- Bicycles: CKT
- Website: Team home page

Key personnel
- General manager: Gaspard Van Petegem

Team name history
- 2009 2010–2011 2012 2013 2014–2015 2016–2019 2020–2021 2022–: PWC Jan Snel; PWC Aliplast; Aliplast; Cibel–Aliplast; Cibel; Cibel–Cebon; Anarto–SVK; Team Metalced
Team Metalced jersey
Jersey

Team Metalced is a Belgian cycling team founded in 2009, which competed at UCI Continental team level, primarily with sponsorship from Cibel between 2014 and 2019.

== Team roster ==
As of 23 August 2021.

Rider	Date of birth
Jérôme Baugnies (BEL)	1 April 1987 (age 39)
Lenny Callebaut (BEL)	31 July 2002 (age 24)
Jelle Cant (BEL)	19 June 1992 (age 34)
Jorre Debaele (BEL)	7 September 2001 (age 24)
Kenny Goossens (BEL)	4 March 1991 (age 35)

Rider	Date of birth
Rokas Kmieliauskas (LTU)	22 August 2000 (age 26)
Gauthier Ronsse (BEL)	13 November 1996 (age 29)
Kevin Verwaest (BEL)	6 January 1989 (age 37)
Jesper Westelinck (NED)	26 January 2000 (age 26)

== Major wins ==
2014
Grand Prix des commerçants de Templeuve, Oliver Naesen

2017
Stage 1 Le Tour de Savoie Mont Blanc, Jimmy Janssens
Stage 3 Le Tour de Savoie Mont Blanc, Kevin de Jonghe
Stage 1 Kreiz Breizh Elites, Joeri Stallaert

2018
Stage 2 Circuit des Ardennes International, Roy Jans
Paris–Mantes-en-Yvelines, Gianni Marchand
Overall Flèche du Sud, Gianni Marchand
Stage 4 Flèche du Sud, Jimmy Janssens
Dwars door de Vlaamse Ardennen, Robby Cobbaert
Stage 3 Kreiz Breizh Elites, Jimmy Janssens
De Kustpijl, Timothy Stevens
