= Heistse Pijl =

Bicycle race in Heist-op-den-Berg, Belgium

Race details
- Date: Late June
- Region: Antwerp, Belgium
- English name: Heistse Pijl
- Local name: Heistse Pijl (in Dutch)
- Discipline: Road
- Competition: UCI Europe Tour
- Type: Single-day
- Web site: www.heistsepijl.be

History
- First edition: 1947
- Editions: 56 (as of 2026)
- First winner: Constant Verschuren (BEL)
- Most wins: Victor Van Schil (BEL) (3 wins)
- Most recent: Noah Hobbs (GBR)

The Heistse Pijl is a single-day road bicycle race held annually in June around the municipality of Heist-op-den-Berg, Belgium. Since 2016, the race is organized as a 1.1 event on the UCI Europe Tour.

Victor van Schil holds the record of 3 victories.

== Winners ==
Year	Country	Rider	Team
1947	Belgium	Constant Verschuren	
1948	Belgium	Victor Jacobs	
1949	Belgium	Charles Vandormael	Alcyon Thomann
1950	Belgium	Josephus Van Staeyen	Erkat Rochet Bury
1951	Belgium	Charles Vandormael	Alcyon Thomann
1952	Belgium	René Janssens	L’ Express
1953	Belgium	Rik Van Looy	L’ Avenir - Gitane
1954	Belgium	Willy Vannitsen	Peugeot
1955	Belgium	Jozef Mariën	Libertas - Huret
1956	Belgium	Emiel Severyns	Elvé - Peugeot
1957	Belgium	Jan Van Gompel	Libertas
1958	Belgium	André Vlayen	Elvé - Marven
1959	Belgium	Leopold Schaeken	Ghigi - Ganna
1960	Belgium	Willy Vanden Berghen	Mercier - BP
1961	Belgium	Louis Troonbeeckx	Dr. Mann
1962	Belgium	Jean-Baptiste Claes	Wiel’s Groene Leeuw
1963	Belgium	Victor Van Schil	Mercier - BP
1964	Belgium	Alfons Hermans	Dr. Mann
1965	Belgium	Michel Jacquemin	Mercier - BP
1966	Belgium	Victor Van Schil	Mercier - BP
1967	Belgium	Paul In 't Ven	Mann - Grundig
1968	Belgium	Victor Van Schil	Faema
1969	Belgium	Rik Van Looy	Willem II - Gazelle
1970	Belgium	Herman Van Springel	Mann - Grundig
1971	Belgium	Frans Verbeeck	Watney
1972	Belgium	Louis Verreydt	Goldor - IJsboerke
1973	Belgium	Willy Scheers	IJsboerke - Bertin
1974	No race		
1975	Belgium	Roger Swerts	IJsboerke - Colner
1976	Belgium	Marcel Laurens	IJsboerke - Colner
1977	Belgium	Frans Verbeeck	Ijsboerke - Colnago
1978	Belgium	Jozef Gysemans	Zoppas - Zeus
1979	Belgium	Eddy Verstraeten	Miniflat
1980	Belgium	Marcel Laurens	Marc - Carlos
1981	Belgium	Daniel Willems	Capri Sonne
1982	Belgium	Marcel Laurens	Daf Trucks
1983	Belgium	Wim Van Eynde	Arnoudt - Rossin
1984– 2007	No race		
2008	Belgium	Geert Omloop	Mitsubishi–Jartazi
2009	Belgium	Greg Van Avermaet	Silence–Lotto
2010	Lithuania	Aidis Kruopis	Palmans-Cras
2011	Belgium	Björn Leukemans	Vacansoleil–DCM
2012	Belgium	Maxime Vantomme	Team Katusha
2013	Belgium	Tom Boonen	Omega Pharma–Quick-Step
2014	Belgium	Tom Boonen	Omega Pharma–Quick-Step
2015	Belgium	Sander Armée	Lotto–Soudal
2016	Netherlands	Dylan Groenewegen	LottoNL–Jumbo
2017	Belgium	Jasper De Buyst	Lotto–Soudal
2018	Latvia	Emīls Liepiņš	ONE Pro Cycling
2019	Colombia	Álvaro Hodeg	Deceuninck–Quick-Step
2020	Belgium	Sasha Weemaes	Sport Vlaanderen–Baloise
2021	Netherlands	Pascal Eenkhoorn	Team Jumbo–Visma
2022	Belgium	Arnaud De Lie	Lotto–Soudal
2023	Netherlands	Olav Kooij	Team Jumbo–Visma
2024	Norway	Alexander Kristoff	Uno-X Mobility
2025	France	Paul Magnier	Soudal–Quick-Step
2026	Great Britain	Noah Hobbs	EF Education–EasyPost
