= 2021 Belgian Road Cycling Cup =

The 2021 Belgian Road Cycling Cup (known as the Bingoal Cycling Cup for sponsorship reasons) was the sixth edition of the Belgian Road Cycling Cup. As no overall winner was declared during the 2020 edition, there was no defending champion.

After leading the standings after every round, Tim Merlier (Alpecin–Fenix) won the cup, having secured two victories and top-ten finishes in all but two of the other races.

== Events ==
With respect to the previous season, the Antwerp Port Epic was added, and both Le Samyn and the Grote Prijs Jef Scherens returned after last appearing during the 2018 edition. As a result, the number of events increased to eleven. In the end, only eight events remained, as Halle–Ingooigem, the Schaal Sels, and the Memorial Rik Van Steenbergen were all eventually cancelled.

Date	Event	Winner	Team	Series leader
2 March	Le Samyn	Tim Merlier (BEL)	Alpecin–Fenix	Tim Merlier (BEL)
7 March	Grote Prijs Jean-Pierre Monseré	Tim Merlier (BEL)	Alpecin–Fenix	Tim Merlier (BEL)
13 May	Circuit de Wallonie	Christophe Laporte (FRA)	Cofidis	Tim Merlier (BEL)
5 June	Dwars door het Hageland	Rasmus Tiller (NOR)	Uno-X Pro Cycling Team	Tim Merlier (BEL)
16 June	Halle–Ingooigem	Race cancelled		Tim Merlier (BEL)
15 August	Grote Prijs Jef Scherens	Niccolò Bonifazio (ITA)	Team TotalEnergies	Tim Merlier (BEL)
20 August	Grote Prijs Marcel Kint	Álvaro Hodeg (COL)	Deceuninck–Quick-Step	Tim Merlier (BEL)
22 August	Schaal Sels	Race cancelled		Tim Merlier (BEL)
12 September	Antwerp Port Epic	Mathieu van der Poel (NED)	Alpecin–Fenix	Tim Merlier (BEL)
17 September	Kampioenschap van Vlaanderen	Jasper Philipsen (BEL)	Alpecin–Fenix	Tim Merlier (BEL)
10 October	Memorial Rik Van Steenbergen	Race cancelled		Tim Merlier (BEL)

== Race results ==
=== Le Samyn ===
Result
Rank	Rider	Team	Time
1	Tim Merlier (BEL)	Alpecin–Fenix	4h 34' 29"
2	Rasmus Tiller (NOR)	Uno-X Pro Cycling Team	+ 0"
3	Andrea Pasqualon (ITA)	Intermarché–Wanty–Gobert Matériaux	+ 0"
4	Sep Vanmarcke (BEL)	Israel Start-Up Nation	+ 0"
5	Hugo Hofstetter (FRA)	Israel Start-Up Nation	+ 0"
6	Amaury Capiot (BEL)	Arkéa–Samsic	+ 0"
7	John Degenkolb (GER)	Lotto–Soudal	+ 0"
8	Dimitri Claeys (BEL)	Team Qhubeka Assos	+ 0"
9	Timothy Dupont (BEL)	Bingoal WB	+ 0"
10	Milan Menten (BEL)	Bingoal WB	+ 0"
11	Jordi Warlop (BEL)	Sport Vlaanderen–Baloise	+ 0"
12	Damien Touzé (FRA)	AG2R Citroën Team	+ 0"
13	Łukasz Wiśniowski (POL)	Team Qhubeka Assos	+ 0"
14	Jempy Drucker (LUX)	Cofidis	+ 0"
15	Fabio Van den Bossche (BEL)	Sport Vlaanderen–Baloise	+ 0"

=== Grote Prijs Jean-Pierre Monseré ===
Result
Rank	Rider	Team	Time
1	Tim Merlier (BEL)	Alpecin–Fenix	4h 34' 44"
2	Mark Cavendish (GBR)	Deceuninck–Quick-Step	+ 0"
3	Timothy Dupont (BEL)	Bingoal WB	+ 0"
4	Pierre Barbier (FRA)	Delko	+ 0"
5	Riccardo Minali (ITA)	Intermarché–Wanty–Gobert Matériaux	+ 0"
6	Thomas Boudat (FRA)	Arkéa–Samsic	+ 0"
7	Jordi Warlop (BEL)	Sport Vlaanderen–Baloise	+ 0"
8	Emiel Vermeulen (BEL)	Xelliss–Roubaix–Lille Métropole	+ 0"
9	Arne Marit (BEL)	Sport Vlaanderen–Baloise	+ 0"
10	Rait Ärm (EST)	Groupama–FDJ Continental Team	+ 0"
11	Jan-Willem van Schip (NED)	BEAT Cycling	+ 0"
12	Jesper Rasch (NED)	SEG Racing Academy	+ 0"
13	Thimo Willems (BEL)	Sport Vlaanderen–Baloise	+ 0"
14	Luca Mozzato (ITA)	B&B Hotels p/b KTM	+ 0"
15	Szymon Sajnok (POL)	Cofidis	+ 0"

=== Circuit de Wallonie ===
Result
Rank	Rider	Team	Time
1	Christophe Laporte (FRA)	Cofidis	4h 18' 42"
2	Marc Sarreau (FRA)	AG2R Citroën Team	+ 0"
3	Laurence Pithie (NZL)	Groupama–FDJ Continental Team	+ 0"
4	Stanisław Aniołkowski (POL)	Bingoal Pauwels Sauces WB	+ 0"
5	Søren Wærenskjold (NOR)	Uno-X Pro Cycling Team	+ 0"
6	Martijn Budding (NED)	BEAT Cycling	+ 0"
7	Stan van Tricht (BEL)	SEG Racing Academy	+ 0"
8	Florian Vermeersch (BEL)	Lotto–Soudal	+ 0"
9	Daniel McLay (GBR)	Arkéa–Samsic	+ 0"
10	Matthew Bostock (GBR)	Canyon dhb SunGod	+ 0"
11	Lukáš Kubiš (SVK)	Dukla Banská Bystrica	+ 0"
12	Baptiste Planckaert (BEL)	Intermarché–Wanty–Gobert Matériaux	+ 0"
13	Marcel Meisen (GER)	Alpecin–Fenix	+ 0"
14	Ben Turner (GBR)	Trinity Racing	+ 0"
15	Timo Roosen (NED)	Jumbo–Visma Development Team	+ 0"

=== Dwars door het Hageland ===
Result
Rank	Rider	Team	Time
1	Rasmus Tiller (NOR)	Uno-X Pro Cycling Team	3h 58' 27"
2	Danny van Poppel (NED)	Intermarché–Wanty–Gobert Matériaux	+ 1"
3	Yves Lampaert (BEL)	Deceuninck–Quick-Step	+ 2"
4	Jonas Rickaert (BEL)	Alpecin–Fenix	+ 2"
5	Piet Allegaert (BEL)	Cofidis	+ 2"
6	Connor Swift (GBR)	Arkéa–Samsic	+ 5"
7	Boy van Poppel (NED)	Intermarché–Wanty–Gobert Matériaux	+ 16"
8	Dries Van Gestel (BEL)	Total Direct Énergie	+ 47"
9	Tim Merlier (BEL)	Alpecin–Fenix	+ 51"
10	Kristoffer Halvorsen (NOR)	Uno-X Pro Cycling Team	+ 51"
11	Toon Aerts (BEL)	Baloise–Trek Lions	+ 51"
12	Milan Menten (BEL)	Bingoal Pauwels Sauces WB	+ 51"
13	Thibau Nys (BEL)	Baloise–Trek Lions	+ 53"
14	Amaury Capiot (BEL)	Arkéa–Samsic	+ 53"
15	Corné van Kessel (NED)	Intermarché–Wanty–Gobert Matériaux	+ 53"

=== Grote Prijs Jef Scherens ===
Result
Rank	Rider	Team	Time
1	Niccolò Bonifazio (ITA)	Team TotalEnergies	4h 28' 12"
2	Nacer Bouhanni (FRA)	Arkéa–Samsic	+ 0"
3	Gianni Vermeersch (BEL)	Alpecin–Fenix	+ 0"
4	Tom Devriendt (BEL)	Intermarché–Wanty–Gobert Matériaux	+ 0"
5	Arne Marit (BEL)	Sport Vlaanderen–Baloise	+ 0"
6	Bram Welten (NED)	Arkéa–Samsic	+ 0"
7	Tim Merlier (BEL)	Alpecin–Fenix	+ 0"
8	Tom Paquot (BEL)	Bingoal Pauwels Sauces WB	+ 0"
9	Jens Reynders (BEL)	Sport Vlaanderen–Baloise	+ 0"
10	Cédric Beullens (BEL)	Sport Vlaanderen–Baloise	+ 0"
11	Joshua Huppertz (GER)	Team Lotto–Kern Haus	+ 0"
12	Bryan Coquard (FRA)	B&B Hotels p/b KTM	+ 4"
13	Dries De Pooter (BEL)	SEG Racing Academy	+ 4"
14	Bert De Backer (BEL)	B&B Hotels p/b KTM	+ 4"
15	Hartthijs de Vries (NED)	Metec–Solarwatt p/b Mantel	+ 4"

=== Grote Prijs Marcel Kint ===
Result
Rank	Rider	Team	Time
1	Álvaro Hodeg (COL)	Deceuninck–Quick-Step	4h 23' 39"
2	Tim Merlier (BEL)	Alpecin–Fenix	+ 0"
3	Danny van Poppel (NED)	Intermarché–Wanty–Gobert Matériaux	+ 0"
4	Bram Welten (NED)	Arkéa–Samsic	+ 0"
5	Jens Reynders (BEL)	Sport Vlaanderen–Baloise	+ 0"
6	Luca Mozzato (ITA)	B&B Hotels p/b KTM	+ 0"
7	Jules Hesters (BEL)	BEAT Cycling	+ 0"
8	Jordi Warlop (BEL)	Sport Vlaanderen–Baloise	+ 0"
9	Shane Archbold (NZL)	Deceuninck–Quick-Step	+ 3"
10	Marius Mayrhofer (GER)	Development Team DSM	+ 5"
11	Victor Broex (NED)	Metec–Solarwatt p/b Mantel	+ 5"
12	Sean Flynn (GBR)	SEG Racing Academy	+ 5"
13	Rasmus Tiller (NOR)	Uno-X Pro Cycling Team	+ 5"
14	Ryan Christensen (NZL)	Canyon dhb SunGod	+ 5"
15	Bas van der Kooij (NED)	VolkerWessels Cycling Team	+ 5"

=== Antwerp Port Epic ===
Result
Rank	Rider	Team	Time
1	Mathieu van der Poel (NED)	Alpecin–Fenix	4h 12' 03"
2	Taco van der Hoorn (NED)	Intermarché–Wanty–Gobert Matériaux	+ 1"
3	Tim Merlier (BEL)	Alpecin–Fenix	+ 1' 14"
4	Danny van Poppel (NED)	Intermarché–Wanty–Gobert Matériaux	+ 1' 14"
5	Rasmus Tiller (NOR)	Uno-X Pro Cycling Team	+ 1' 14"
6	Piotr Havik (NED)	BEAT Cycling	+ 1' 14"
7	Ludovic Robeet (BEL)	Bingoal Pauwels Sauces WB	+ 1' 14"
8	Thomas Joseph (BEL)	Tarteletto–Isorex	+ 1' 14"
9	Dries De Bondt (BEL)	Alpecin–Fenix	+ 1' 19"
10	Tiesj Benoot (BEL)	Team DSM	+ 1' 30"
11	Kenneth Van Rooy (BEL)	Sport Vlaanderen–Baloise	+ 1' 30"
12	Bert De Backer (BEL)	B&B Hotels p/b KTM	+ 1' 30"
13	Jonas Rickaert (BEL)	Alpecin–Fenix	+ 1' 43"
14	Casper van Uden (NED)	Team DSM	+ 2' 50"
15	Campbell Stewart (NZL)	Black Spoke Pro Cycling	+ 2' 50"

=== Kampioenschap van Vlaanderen ===
Result
Rank	Rider	Team	Time
1	Jasper Philipsen (BEL)	Alpecin–Fenix	4h 11' 14"
2	Dylan Groenewegen (NED)	Team Jumbo–Visma	+ 0"
3	Martin Laas (EST)	Bora–Hansgrohe	+ 0"
4	Matteo Moschetti (ITA)	Trek–Segafredo	+ 0"
5	Niccolò Bonifazio (ITA)	Team TotalEnergies	+ 0"
6	Baptiste Planckaert (BEL)	Intermarché–Wanty–Gobert Matériaux	+ 0"
7	Wessel Krul (NED)	SEG Racing Academy	+ 0"
8	Mārtiņš Pluto (LAT)	Abloc CT	+ 0"
9	Nathan Vandepitte (BEL)	Bingoal Pauwels Sauces WB	+ 0"
10	Stanisław Aniołkowski (POL)	Bingoal Pauwels Sauces WB	+ 0"
11	Olav Kooij (NED)	Team Jumbo–Visma	+ 0"
12	Maximilien Picoux (BEL)	Xelliss–Roubaix–Lille Métropole	+ 0"
13	Campbell Stewart (NZL)	Black Spoke Pro Cycling	+ 0"
14	Lionel Taminiaux (BEL)	Alpecin–Fenix	+ 0"
15	Michael Van Staeyen (BEL)	EvoPro Racing	+ 0"

== Final cup standings ==
As of 17 September 2021, after the Kampioenschap van Vlaanderen

Pos.	Rider	Team	Points
1	Tim Merlier (BEL)	Alpecin–Fenix	76
2	Rasmus Tiller (NOR)	Uno-X Pro Cycling Team	44
3	Danny van Poppel (NED)	Intermarché–Wanty–Gobert Matériaux	44
4	Niccolò Bonifazio (ITA)	Team TotalEnergies	27
5	Mathieu van der Poel (NED)	Alpecin–Fenix	24
6	Jens Reynders (BEL)	Sport Vlaanderen–Baloise	24
7	Bram Welten (FRA)	Arkéa–Samsic	22
8	Jordi Warlop (BEL)	Sport Vlaanderen–Baloise	22
9	Timothy Dupont (BEL)	Bingoal Pauwels Sauces WB	21
10	Taco van der Hoorn (NED)	Intermarché–Wanty–Gobert Matériaux	18
