= 2022 Belgian Road Cycling Cup =

Belgian cycling competition

The 2022 Belgian Road Cycling Cup (known as the Exterioo Cycling Cup for sponsorship reasons) is the seventh edition of the Belgian Road Cycling Cup. With the inclusion of the Dutch races Ronde van Drenthe and Veenendaal–Veenendaal, this marks the first season in which the Belgian Road Cycling Cup includes races outside of Belgium.

The defending champion is Tim Merlier of Alpecin–Fenix.

== Events ==
The event schedule was revealed on 9 February 2022. With respect to the previous season, the Grote Prijs Jef Scherens, Halle–Ingooigem, the Schaal Sels, and the Memorial Rik Van Steenbergen were removed, the last three of which were not held in 2021 for various reasons, resulting in the 2021 season only having eight races. These four races were replaced with the Ronde van Drenthe, the Veenendaal–Veenendaal Classic, the Elfstedenronde, and the Circuit Franco–Belge to keep the total number of races at eleven, all of which are also part of the 2022 UCI Europe Tour.

Date	Event	Winner	Team	Series leader	Ref.
1 March	Le Samyn	Matteo Trentin (ITA)	UAE Team Emirates	Matteo Trentin (ITA)	
6 March	Grote Prijs Jean-Pierre Monseré	Arnaud De Lie (BEL)	Lotto–Soudal	Dries De Bondt (BEL)	
13 March	Ronde van Drenthe	Dries Van Gestel (BEL)	Team TotalEnergies	Hugo Hofstetter (FRA)	
21 May	Veenendaal–Veenendaal Classic	Dylan Groenewegen (NED)	Team BikeExchange–Jayco	Hugo Hofstetter (FRA)	
22 May	Antwerp Port Epic	Florian Vermeersch (BEL)	Lotto–Soudal	Arnaud De Lie (BEL)	
26 May	Circuit de Wallonie	Andrea Pasqualon (ITA)	Intermarché–Wanty–Gobert Matériaux	Arnaud De Lie (BEL)	
29 May	Grote Prijs Marcel Kint	Arnaud De Lie (BEL)	Lotto–Soudal	Arnaud De Lie (BEL)	
11 June	Dwars door het Hageland	Oscar Riesebeek (NED)	Alpecin–Fenix	Arnaud De Lie (BEL)	
12 June	Elfstedenronde	Fabio Jakobsen (NED)	Quick-Step Alpha Vinyl Team	Arnaud De Lie (BEL)	
10 August	Circuit Franco–Belge	Alexander Kristoff (NOR)	Intermarché–Wanty–Gobert Matériaux	Arnaud De Lie (BEL)	
16 September	Kampioenschap van Vlaanderen	Fabio Jakobsen (NED)	Quick-Step Alpha Vinyl Team	Arnaud De Lie (BEL)	

== Race results ==
=== Le Samyn ===
Result
Rank	Rider	Team	Time
1	Matteo Trentin (ITA)	UAE Team Emirates	4h 49' 29"
2	Hugo Hofstetter (FRA)	Arkéa–Samsic	+ 0"
3	Dries De Bondt (BEL)	Alpecin–Fenix	+ 0"
4	Stan Dewulf (BEL)	AG2R Citroën Team	+ 0"
5	Loïc Vliegen (BEL)	Intermarché–Wanty–Gobert Matériaux	+ 0"
6	Victor Campenaerts (BEL)	Lotto–Soudal	+ 0"
7	Dries Van Gestel (BEL)	Team TotalEnergies	+ 0"
8	Bert Van Lerberghe (BEL)	Quick-Step Alpha Vinyl Team	+ 0"
9	Rasmus Tiller (NOR)	Uno-X Pro Cycling Team	+ 4"
10	Arnaud De Lie (BEL)	Lotto–Soudal	+ 4"
11	Andrea Pasqualon (ITA)	Intermarché–Wanty–Gobert Matériaux	+ 4"
12	Oliver Naesen (BEL)	AG2R Citroën Team	+ 4"
13	Amaury Capiot (BEL)	Arkéa–Samsic	+ 4"
14	Luca Mozzato (ITA)	B&B Hotels–KTM	+ 4"
15	Timothy Dupont (BEL)	Bingoal Pauwels Sauces WB	+ 4"

=== Grote Prijs Jean-Pierre Monseré ===
Result
Rank	Rider	Team	Time
1	Arnaud De Lie (BEL)	Lotto–Soudal	4h 45' 03"
2	Dries De Bondt (BEL)	Alpecin–Fenix	+ 0"
3	Hugo Hofstetter (FRA)	Arkéa–Samsic	+ 0"
4	Gerben Thijssen (BEL)	Intermarché–Wanty–Gobert Matériaux	+ 0"
5	Ethan Vernon (GBR)	Quick-Step Alpha Vinyl Team	+ 0"
6	Pierre Barbier (FRA)	B&B Hotels–KTM	+ 0"
7	Donavan Grondin (FRA)	Arkéa–Samsic	+ 0"
8	Laurence Pithie (NZL)	Groupama–FDJ Continental Team	+ 0"
9	Jensen Plowright (AUS)	Groupama–FDJ Continental Team	+ 0"
10	Stanisław Aniołkowski (POL)	Bingoal Pauwels Sauces WB	+ 0"
11	Sandy Dujardin (FRA)	Team TotalEnergies	+ 0"
12	Kenneth Van Rooy (BEL)	Sport Vlaanderen–Baloise	+ 0"
13	Oliver Wood (GBR)	WiV SunGod	+ 0"
14	Axel Zingle (FRA)	Cofidis	+ 0"
15	Vito Braet (BEL)	Sport Vlaanderen–Baloise	+ 0"

=== Ronde van Drenthe ===
Result
Rank	Rider	Team	Time
1	Dries Van Gestel (BEL)	Team TotalEnergies	5h 08' 47"
2	Barnabás Peák (HUN)	Intermarché–Wanty–Gobert Matériaux	+ 5"
3	Hugo Hofstetter (FRA)	Arkéa–Samsic	+ 5"
4	Timo Roosen (NED)	Team Jumbo–Visma	+ 5"
5	Joren Bloem (NED)	Abloc CT	+ 5"
6	Mick van Dijke (NED)	Team Jumbo–Visma	+ 5"
7	Kévin Vauquelin (FRA)	Arkéa–Samsic	+ 23"
8	Dries De Bondt (BEL)	Alpecin–Fenix	+ 27"
9	Rick Ottema (NED)	Metec–Solarwatt p/b Mantel	+ 27"
10	Rick Pluimers (NED)	Team Jumbo–Visma	+ 27"
11	Casper van Uden (NED)	Development Team DSM	+ 27"
12	Benjamin Declercq (BEL)	Arkéa–Samsic	+ 29"
13	Pascal Eenkhoorn (NED)	Team Jumbo–Visma	+ 31"
14	Tomáš Kopecký (CZE)	Abloc CT	+ 32"
15	Gerben Thijssen (BEL)	Intermarché–Wanty–Gobert Matériaux	+ 1' 14"

=== Veenendaal–Veenendaal Classic ===
Result
Rank	Rider	Team	Time
1	Dylan Groenewegen (NED)	Team BikeExchange–Jayco	4h 32' 40"
2	Gerben Thijssen (BEL)	Intermarché–Wanty–Gobert Matériaux	+ 0"
3	Arnaud De Lie (BEL)	Lotto–Soudal	+ 0"
4	Jakub Mareczko (ITA)	Alpecin–Fenix	+ 0"
5	Timothy Dupont (BEL)	Bingoal Pauwels Sauces WB	+ 0"
6	Sasha Weemaes (BEL)	Sport Vlaanderen–Baloise	+ 0"
7	Pierre Barbier (FRA)	B&B Hotels–KTM	+ 0"
8	Lionel Taminiaux (BEL)	Alpecin–Fenix	+ 0"
9	Arvid de Kleijn (NED)	Human Powered Health	+ 0"
10	Jordi Warlop (BEL)	B&B Hotels–KTM	+ 0"
11	Casper van Uden (NED)	Team DSM	+ 0"
12	Thimo Willems (BEL)	Minerva Cycling Team	+ 0"
13	Tim van Dijke (NED)	Team Jumbo–Visma	+ 0"
14	Loe van Belle (NED)	Team Jumbo–Visma	+ 0"
15	Coen Vermeltfoort (NED)	VolkerWessels Cycling Team	+ 0"

=== Antwerp Port Epic ===
Result
Rank	Rider	Team	Time
1	Florian Vermeersch (BEL)	Lotto–Soudal	4h 17' 22"
2	Gianni Vermeersch (BEL)	Alpecin–Fenix	+ 5"
3	Thibau Nys (BEL)	Baloise–Trek Lions	+ 13"
4	Jens Reynders (BEL)	Sport Vlaanderen–Baloise	+ 17"
5	Adrien Petit (FRA)	Team TotalEnergies	+ 17"
6	Timo Kielich (BEL)	Alpecin–Fenix	+ 26"
7	Gerben Thijssen (BEL)	Intermarché–Wanty–Gobert Matériaux	+ 3' 19"
8	Arnaud De Lie (BEL)	Lotto–Soudal	+ 3' 19"
9	Milan Menten (BEL)	Bingoal Pauwels Sauces WB	+ 3' 19"
10	Andrea Pasqualon (ITA)	Intermarché–Wanty–Gobert Matériaux	+ 3' 19"
11	Ward Vanhoof (BEL)	Sport Vlaanderen–Baloise	+ 3' 19"
12	Toon Vandebosch (BEL)	Alpecin–Fenix	+ 3' 19"
13	Niels Vandeputte (BEL)	Alpecin–Fenix	+ 3' 19"
14	Coen Vermeltfoort (NED)	VolkerWessels Cycling Team	+ 3' 19"
15	Jules Hesters (BEL)	Sport Vlaanderen–Baloise	+ 3' 19"

=== Circuit de Wallonie ===
Result
Rank	Rider	Team	Time
1	Andrea Pasqualon (ITA)	Intermarché–Wanty–Gobert Matériaux	4h 22' 39"
2	Axel Zingle (FRA)	Cofidis	+ 0"
3	Philippe Gilbert (BEL)	Lotto–Soudal	+ 3"
4	Niccolò Bonifazio (ITA)	Team TotalEnergies	+ 3"
5	Piet Allegaert (BEL)	Cofidis	+ 3"
6	Maxim Van Gils (BEL)	Lotto–Soudal	+ 3"
7	Milan Menten (BEL)	Bingoal Pauwels Sauces WB	+ 3"
8	Lionel Taminiaux (BEL)	Alpecin–Fenix	+ 3"
9	Lennert Teugels (BEL)	Tarteletto–Isorex	+ 3"
10	Sandy Dujardin (FRA)	Team TotalEnergies	+ 3"
11	Aaron Gate (NZL)	Bolton Equities Black Spoke Pro Cycling	+ 3"
12	Arnaud De Lie (BEL)	Lotto–Soudal	+ 3"
13	Maurice Ballerstedt (GER)	Alpecin–Fenix	+ 3"
14	Jordi Warlop (BEL)	B&B Hotels–KTM	+ 3"
15	Obie Vidts (BEL)	Elevate p/b Home Solution–Soenens	+ 3"

=== Grote Prijs Marcel Kint ===
Result
Rank	Rider	Team	Time
1	Arnaud De Lie (BEL)	Lotto–Soudal	4h 38' 49"
2	Luca Mozzato (ITA)	B&B Hotels–KTM	+ 0"
3	Gerben Thijssen (BEL)	Intermarché–Wanty–Gobert Matériaux	+ 0"
4	Chris Lawless (GBR)	Team TotalEnergies	+ 0"
5	Piet Allegaert (BEL)	Cofidis	+ 0"
6	Pierre Barbier (FRA)	B&B Hotels–KTM	+ 0"
7	Lionel Taminiaux (BEL)	Alpecin–Fenix	+ 0"
8	Sep Vanmarcke (BEL)	Israel–Premier Tech	+ 0"
9	Niccolò Bonifazio (ITA)	Team TotalEnergies	+ 0"
10	Axel Zingle (FRA)	Cofidis	+ 0"
11	Maxime De Poorter (BEL)	Tarteletto–Isorex	+ 0"
12	Clément Russo (FRA)	Arkéa–Samsic	+ 0"
13	Timothy Dupont (BEL)	Bingoal Pauwels Sauces WB	+ 0"
14	Joren Bloem (NED)	Abloc CT	+ 0"
15	Daniel McLay (GBR)	Arkéa–Samsic	+ 0"

== Finalcup standings ==
As of 14 October 2022

Pos.	Rider	Team	Points
1	Arnaud De Lie (BEL)	Lotto–Soudal	83
2	Gerben Thijssen (BEL)	Intermarché–Wanty–Gobert Matériaux	58
3	Hugo Hofstetter (FRA)	Arkéa–Samsic	40
4	Dries Van Gestel (BEL)	Team TotalEnergies	39
5	Pierre Barbier (FRA)	B&B Hotels–KTM	36
6	Dries De Bondt (BEL)	Alpecin–Fenix	35
7	Fabio Jakobsen (NED)	Quick-Step Alpha Vinyl Team	32
8	Piet Allegaert (BEL)	Cofidis	32
9	Dylan Groenewegen (NED)	Team BikeExchange–Jayco	29
10	Caleb Ewan (AUS)	Lotto–Soudal	28
