= Belgian Road Cycling Cup =

- Current season, competition or edition: 2024 Belgian Road Cycling Cup
- Sport: Road bicycle racing
- Founded: 2016
- Country: Belgium & Netherlands
- Most recent champion: Caleb Ewan (AUS)
- Most titles: Timothy Dupont (2 wins)

The Belgian Road Cycling Cup (also known as Lotto Cycling Cup after its sponsor) is a road bicycle racing competition established in 2016 and consists of a number of standalone one-day races, mostly in Belgium but since 2022 some are held as well in the Netherlands. In each race, the top 15 riders score points and the rider scoring the most points in total is crowned the Belgian Cycling Cup champion. A separate classification was kept for the best youngster and best team, but these have been cancelled since 2017 and 2018 respectively.

The lead sponsor changed regularly throughout the years, causing the official name to change often as well: from 2016 to 2018 it was known as the Napoleon Games Cycling Cup, from 2019 to 2021 as the Bingoal Cycling Cup, in 2022 as the Exterioo Cycling Cup, and since 2023 as the Lotto Cycling Cup.

== Points distribution ==
For the individual rankings, points are awarded to all eligible riders each race according to the following table:

Points distribution
Position	1	2	3	4	5	6	7	8	9	10	11	12	13	14	15
Points	16	14	13	12	11	10	9	8	7	6	5	4	3	2	1

Additionally, during each race there are three intermediate sprints for which the top three riders receive three, two and one point respectively.

Until 2018, the positions of the first three riders of each team were added together to give the team position with only riders finishing in the top 50 taken into account. The team with the lowest team position was the winner of the team competition for that race. E.g.: a team having their first three riders all on the podium will have a team position score of 1+2+3=6 and since no other team will have a lower team position, this team won 12 points for the team standings. Note that first all teams with three (or more) riders finishing in the top 50 were ranked, then the teams with only two riders, then teams with only one rider. Finally, each race the team of the winning rider received two bonus points.

Team points distribution
Position	1	2	3	4	5	6	7	8	9	10
Points	12	9	8	7	6	5	4	3	2	1

== Winners ==
Year	Individual Champion		Young Rider Champion		Teams' Champion
Year	Winner	Team	Winner	Team	Teams' Champion
2016	Timothy Dupont (BEL)	Verandas Willems	Fernando Gaviria (COL)	Etixx–Quick-Step	Lotto–Soudal
2017	Jasper De Buyst (BEL)	Lotto–Soudal	Not awarded		LottoNL–Jumbo
2018	Timothy Dupont (BEL)	Wanty–Groupe Gobert	Not awarded		
2019	Baptiste Planckaert (BEL)	Wallonie Bruxelles	Not awarded		
2020	Not awarded (Note: Due to the COVID-19 pandemic, several scheduled races were cancelled, reducing the list of remaining events to just two. The organisation decided not to determine an overall winner and kept the two remaining races as entirely separate events.)				
2021	Tim Merlier (BEL)	Alpecin–Fenix	Not awarded		
2022	Arnaud De Lie (BEL)	Lotto–Soudal	Not awarded		
2023	Caleb Ewan (AUS)	Lotto–Dstny	Not awarded		
2024	Emilien Jeannière (FRA)	Team TotalEnergies	Not awarded		

== Statistics ==
As of 3 October 2024, after the 2024 Belgian Road Cycling Cup

=== Most event wins (individual) ===
Rank	Cyclist	# Events	Events
1	Dylan Groenewegen (NED)	5	Heistse Pijl (2016), Tour de l'Eurométropole (2016), Kampioenschap van Vlaanderen (2018), Arnhem–Veenendaal Classic (2022 & 2023)
2	Dries De Bondt (BEL)	4	Halle–Ingooigem (2016 & 2019) & Memorial Rik Van Steenbergen (2019), Antwerp Port Epic (2023)
2	Arnaud De Lie (BEL)	4	Grote Prijs Jean-Pierre Monseré (2022), Grote Prijs Marcel Kint (2022), Grote Prijs Jef Scherens (2023) & Circuit de Wallonie (2024)
4	Fabio Jakobsen (NED)	3	Grote Prijs Jean-Pierre Monseré (2020), Elfstedenronde (2022) & Kampioenschap van Vlaanderen (2022)
4	Alexander Kristoff (NOR)	3	Circuit Franco-Belge (2022), Elfstedenronde (2024) & Antwerp Port Epic (2024)
4	Tim Merlier (BEL)	3	Le Samyn (2021), Grote Prijs Jean-Pierre Monseré (2021) & Kampioenschap van Vlaanderen (2024)
4	Jasper Philipsen (BEL)	3	Kampioenschap van Vlaanderen (2021 & 2023) & Elfstedenronde (2023)
4	Niki Terpstra (NED)	3	Le Samyn (2016 & 2018) & Dwars door het Hageland (2016)
9	Jasper De Buyst (BEL)	2	Heistse Pijl (2017) & Binche–Chimay–Binche (2017)
9	Arnaud Démare (FRA)	2	Binche–Chimay–Binche (2016) & Halle–Ingooigem (2017)
9	Timothy Dupont (BEL)	2	Kampioenschap van Vlaanderen (2016) & Grote Prijs Jef Scherens (2017)
9	Rasmus Tiller (NOR)	2	Dwars door het Hageland (2021 & 2023)
9	Mathieu van der Poel (NED)	2	Dwars door het Hageland (2017) & Antwerp Port Epic (2021)
9	Danny van Poppel (NED)	2	Halle–Ingooigem (2018) & Binche–Chimay–Binche (2018)
11	37 riders	1	

=== Most event wins (nation) ===
Rank	Country	# Events	Most recent winner	Most recent event	Different winners
1	Belgium	32	Tim Merlier	2024 Kampioenschap van Vlaanderen	20
2	Netherlands	17	Dylan Groenewegen	2023 Arnhem–Veenendaal Classic	7
3	France	7	Christophe Laporte	2021 Circuit de Wallonie	6
3	Norway	7	Markus Hoelgaard	2024 Tour of Leuven	4
5	Italy	4	Andrea Pasqualon	2022 Circuit de Wallonie	4
6	Colombia	2	Álvaro Hodeg	2021 Grote Prijs Marcel Kint	2
6	Latvia	2	Krists Neilands	2018 Dwars door het Hageland	2
8	Australia	1	Caleb Ewan	2023 Grote Prijs Marcel Kint	1
8	Denmark	1	Mads Pedersen	2018 Tour de l'Eurométropole	1
8	Eritrea	1	Biniam Girmay	2024 Circuit Franco-Belge	1
8	Germany	1	Jannik Steimle	2019 Kampioenschap van Vlaanderen	1
8	Great Britain	1	Daniel McLay	2017 Tour de l'Eurométropole	1
8	Slovakia	1	Erik Baška	2016 Handzame Classic	1

=== Most event wins (team) ===
Defunct teams in italics

Rank	Team	# Events	Most recent winner	Most recent event
1	Alpecin–Deceuninck (Note: Includes 1 win as Beobank–Corendon, 2 as Corendon–Circus and 6 as Alpecin–Fenix.)	13	Gianni Vermeersch (BEL)	2024 Dwars door het Hageland
2	Soudal–Quick-Step (Note: Includes 2 wins as Etixx–Quick-Step, 3 as Quick-Step Floors, 3 as Deceuninck–Quick-Step and 2 as Quick-Step Alpha Vinyl Team.)	11	Tim Merlier (BEL)	2024 Kampioenschap van Vlaanderen
3	Lotto–Dstny (Note: Includes 5 wins as Lotto–Soudal.)	10	Arnaud De Lie (BEL)	2024 Circuit de Wallonie
4	Intermarché–Wanty (Note: Includes 3 wins under the name Wanty–Groupe Gobert, 2 as Intermarché–Wanty–Gobert Matériaux and 1 as Intermarché–Circus–Wanty.)	8	Biniam Girmay (ERI)	2024 Circuit Franco-Belge
5	Visma–Lease a Bike (Note: All 6 wins under the name LottoNL–Jumbo.)	6	Dylan Groenewegen (NED)	2018 Kampioenschap van Vlaanderen
6	Uno-X Mobility (Note: Includes 2 wins as Uno-X Pro Cycling Team.)	5	Markus Hoelgaard (NOR)	2024 Tour of Leuven
7	Cofidis	4	Christophe Laporte (FRA)	2021 Circuit de Wallonie
8	Team TotalEnergies (Note: Includes 1 win as Total Direct Énergie.)	3	Dries Van Gestel (BEL)	2022 Ronde van Drenthe
8	Vérandas Willems–Crelan (Note: Includes 2 wins as Verandas Willems.)	3	Timothy Dupont (BEL)	2017 Grote Prijs Jef Scherens
10	Groupama–FDJ (Note: Both wins as FDJ.)	2	Arnaud Démare (FRA)	2017 Halle–Ingooigem
10	Team Jayco–AlUla (Note: Includes one win as Team BikeExchange–Jayco.)	2	Dylan Groenewegen (NED)	2023 Arnhem–Veenendaal Classic
10	Lidl–Trek (Note: Both wins as Trek–Segafredo.)	2	Mads Pedersen (DEN)	2018 Tour de l'Eurométropole
13	Arkéa–B&B Hotels (Note: Won as Fortuneo–Oscaro.)	1	Daniel McLay (GBR)	2017 Tour de l'Eurométropole
13	B&B Hotels–KTM (Note: Won as Vital Concept–B&B Hotels.)	1	Bryan Coquard (FRA)	2019 Grote Prijs Marcel Kint
13	Bora–Hansgrohe	1	Jordi Meeus (BEL)	2023 Circuit de Wallonie
13	Israel–Premier Tech (Note: Won as Israel Cycling Academy.)	1	Krists Neilands (LAT)	2018 Dwars door het Hageland
13	Joker Fuel of Norway (Note: Won as Joker Icopal.)	1	Kristoffer Halvorsen (NOR)	2017 Handzame Classic
13	ONE Pro Cycling	1	Emīls Liepiņš (LAT)	2018 Heistse Pijl
13	Tinkoff	1	Erik Baška (SVK)	2016 Handzame Classic
13	UAE Team Emirates	1	Matteo Trentin (ITA)	2022 Le Samyn

== See also ==
- French Road Cycling Cup
- Italian Road Cycling Cup
