= 2023 Belgian Road Cycling Cup =

Belgian cycling competition

The 2023 Belgian Road Cycling Cup (known as the Lotto Cycling Cup for sponsorship reasons) was the eighth edition of the Belgian Road Cycling Cup. The defending champion was Arnaud De Lie of Lotto–Soudal, he was succeeded by his teammate Caleb Ewan.

== Events ==
The event schedule was revealed in February 2023 and involves the same races as the previous season, with the only exception the Ronde van Drenthe which dropped out. Later throughout the season the Circuit Franco–Belge was removed and replaced by the returning Grote Prijs Jef Scherens, which was already part of the cup from 2016 to 2018.

Date	Event	Winner	Team	Series leader	Ref.
28 February	Le Samyn	Milan Menten (BEL)	Lotto–Dstny	Milan Menten (BEL)	
5 March	Grote Prijs Jean-Pierre Monseré	Gerben Thijssen (BEL)	Intermarché–Circus–Wanty	Hugo Hofstetter (FRA)	
18 May	Circuit de Wallonie	Jordi Meeus (BEL)	Bora–Hansgrohe	Hugo Hofstetter (FRA)	
20 May	Veenendaal–Veenendaal Classic	Dylan Groenewegen (NED)	Team Jayco–AlUla	Hugo Hofstetter (FRA)	
21 May	Antwerp Port Epic	Dries De Bondt (BEL)	Alpecin–Deceuninck	Hugo Hofstetter (FRA)	
27 May	Grote Prijs Marcel Kint	Caleb Ewan (AUS)	Lotto–Dstny	Caleb Ewan (AUS)	
10 June	Dwars door het Hageland	Rasmus Tiller (NOR)	Uno-X Pro Cycling Team	Caleb Ewan (AUS)	
11 June	Elfstedenronde	Jasper Philipsen (BEL)	Alpecin–Deceuninck	Caleb Ewan (AUS)	
15 August	Grote Prijs Jef Scherens	Arnaud De Lie (BEL)	Lotto–Dstny	Caleb Ewan (AUS)	
15 September	Kampioenschap van Vlaanderen	Jasper Philipsen (BEL)	Alpecin–Deceuninck	Caleb Ewan (AUS)	

== Race results ==
=== Le Samyn ===
Result
Rank	Rider	Team	Time
1	Milan Menten (BEL)	Lotto–Dstny	4h 49' 28"
2	Hugo Hofstetter (FRA)	Arkéa–Samsic	+ 0"
3	Edward Theuns (BEL)	Trek–Segafredo	+ 0"
4	Alberto Dainese (ITA)	Team DSM	+ 0"
5	Luca Mozzato (ITA)	Arkéa–Samsic	+ 0"
6	Søren Kragh Andersen (DEN)	Alpecin–Deceuninck	+ 0"
7	Pierre Gautherat (FRA)	AG2R Citroën Team	+ 0"
8	Mike Teunissen (NED)	Intermarché–Circus–Wanty	+ 0"
9	Vito Braet (BEL)	Team Flanders–Baloise	+ 0"
10	Andreas Stokbro (DEN)	Leopard TOGT Pro Cycling	+ 0"

=== Grote Prijs Jean-Pierre Monseré ===
Result
Rank	Rider	Team	Time
1	Gerben Thijssen (BEL)	Intermarché–Circus–Wanty	4h 35' 25"
2	Caleb Ewan (AUS)	Lotto–Dstny	+ 0"
3	Sam Welsford (AUS)	Team DSM	+ 0"
4	Hugo Hofstetter (FRA)	Arkéa–Samsic	+ 0"
5	Piet Allegaert (BEL)	Cofidis	+ 0"
6	Jordi Warlop (BEL)	Soudal–Quick-Step	+ 0"
7	Matteo Malucelli (ITA)	Bingoal WB	+ 0"
8	Vito Braet (BEL)	Team Flanders–Baloise	+ 0"
9	Itamar Einhorn (ISR)	Israel–Premier Tech	+ 0"
10	Timothy Dupont (BEL)	Tarteletto–Isorex	+ 0"

== Final standings ==
Pos.	Rider	Team	Points
1	Caleb Ewan (AUS)	Lotto–Dstny	44
2	Giacomo Nizzolo (ITA)	Israel–Premier Tech	42
3	Gerben Thijssen (BEL)	Intermarché–Circus–Wanty	40
4	Timothy Dupont (BEL)	Tarteletto–Isorex	33
5	Jasper Philipsen (BEL)	Alpecin–Deceuninck	32
6	Timo Kielich (BEL)	Alpecin–Deceuninck	32
7	Hugo Hofstetter (FRA)	Arkéa–Samsic	32
8	Dylan Groenewegen (NED)	Team Jayco–AlUla	30
9	Milan Menten (BEL)	Lotto–Dstny	28
10	Fabio Jakobsen (NED)	Soudal–Quick-Step	26
