= 2020 Belgian Road Cycling Cup =

The 2020 Belgian Road Cycling Cup (known as the Bingoal Cycling Cup for sponsorship reasons) was the fifth edition of the Belgian Road Cycling Cup. Baptiste Planckaert was the defending champion. He was not succeeded as the organisers decided not to keep the overall standings due to the large number of cancelled races as a result of the COVID-19 pandemic.

== Events ==
With respect to the previous season the event in Halle–Ingooigem was dropped due to the organisers of this race focusing on the organisation of the 2020 Belgian National Road race championships. As a result the number of events dropped from eight to seven, although the late cancellation of the Grote Prijs Jean-Pierre Monseré due to storms in 2019 resulted in just seven races to be held that year as well. Eventually only two races were held as only the Grote Prijs Jean-Pierre Monseré was completed before the COVID-19 pandemic in Belgium, thereafter all other races got cancelled with the exception of Dwars door het Hageland which was rescheduled from 17 June 2020 to 15 August 2020.

Date	Event	Winner	Team	Series leader
8 March	Grote Prijs Jean-Pierre Monseré	Fabio Jakobsen (NED)	Deceuninck–Quick-Step	Fabio Jakobsen (NED) (Note: Jakobsen was the series leader after the first race, however several months later with many other races now cancelled, it was decided not to award an overall winner and the overall standings were determined void.)
21 May	Circuit de Wallonie	cancelled		
24 May	Grote Prijs Marcel Kint	cancelled		
15 August (Note: Was originally scheduled for June 17th.)	Dwars door het Hageland	Jonas Rickaert (BEL)	Alpecin–Fenix	not awarded
23 August	Schaal Sels	cancelled		
18 September	Kampioenschap van Vlaanderen	cancelled		
11 October	Memorial Rik Van Steenbergen	cancelled		

== Race results ==
=== Grote Prijs Jean-Pierre Monseré ===
Result
Rank	Rider	Team	Time
1	Fabio Jakobsen (NED)	Deceuninck–Quick-Step	4h 41' 27"
2	Timothy Dupont (BEL)	Circus–Wanty Gobert	+ 0"
3	Alfdan De Decker (BEL)	Circus–Wanty Gobert	+ 0"
4	Luca Mozzato (ITA)	B&B Hotels–Vital Concept	+ 0"
5	Thomas Boudat (FRA)	Arkéa–Samsic	+ 0"
6	Boris Vallée (BEL)	Bingoal–Wallonie Bruxelles	+ 0"
7	Florian Sénéchal (FRA)	Deceuninck–Quick-Step	+ 0"
8	Christophe Noppe (BEL)	Arkéa–Samsic	+ 0"
9	Oscar Gatto (ITA)	Bora–Hansgrohe	+ 0"
10	Enzo Wouters (BEL)	Tarteletto–Isorex	+ 0"
11	Aaron Grosser (GER)	Bike Aid	+ 0"
12	Emiel Vermeulen (BEL)	Natura4Ever–Roubaix–Lille Métropole	+ 0"
13	Stanislaw Aniolkowski (POL)	CCC Development Team	+ 0"
14	Nikolas Maes (BEL)	Lotto–Soudal	+ 0"
15	Jesper Asselman (NED)	Metec–TKH	+ 0"

=== Dwars door het Hageland ===
Result
Rank	Rider	Team	Time
1	Jonas Rickaert (BEL)	Alpecin–Fenix	4h 20' 20"
2	Nils Eekhoff (NED)	Team Sunweb	+ 7"
3	Gianni Vermeersch (BEL)	Alpecin–Fenix	+ 16"
4	Florian Sénéchal (FRA)	Deceuninck–Quick-Step	+ 16"
5	Tim Merlier (BEL)	Alpecin–Fenix	+ 19"
6	Benjamin Declercq (BEL)	Arkéa–Samsic	+ 23"
7	Timo Roosen (NED)	Team Jumbo–Visma	+ 23"
8	Bert-Jan Lindeman (NED)	Team Jumbo–Visma	+ 25"
9	Toon Aerts (BEL)	Telenet–Baloise Lions	+ 26"
10	Bert De Backer (BEL)	B&B Hotels–Vital Concept	+ 26"
11	Taco van der Hoorn (NED)	Team Jumbo–Visma	+ 29"
12	Dries Van Gestel (BEL)	Total Direct Énergie	+ 29"
13	Aksel Nõmmela (EST)	Bingoal–Wallonie Bruxelles	+ 31"
14	Yves Coolen (BEL)	BEAT Cycling Club	+ 33"
15	Bram Welten (NED)	Arkéa–Samsic	+ 35"
