= 2019 Belgian Road Cycling Cup =

The 2019 Belgian Road Cycling Cup (known as the Bingoal Cycling Cup for sponsorship reasons) is the fourth edition of the Belgian Road Cycling Cup. Timothy Dupont is the defending champion.

== Events ==
Several changes were made to the calendar compared to the previous season: Le Samyn, Dwars door West–Vlaanderen, the Heistse Pijl, the Grote Prijs Jef Scherens, the Eurométropole and Binche–Chimay–Binche no longer took part and were replaced by the Grote Prijs Jean-Pierre Monseré, the Circuit de Wallonie, the Schaal Sels and the Memorial Rik Van Steenbergen. As a result, the total number of races dropped from ten to eight.

Date	Event	Winner	Team	Series leader
10 March	Grote Prijs Jean-Pierre Monseré	Race cancelled due to storm		
26 May	Grote Prijs Marcel Kint	Bryan Coquard (FRA)	Vital Concept–B&B Hotels	Bryan Coquard (FRA)
30 May	Circuit de Wallonie	Thomas Boudat (FRA)	Total Direct Énergie	Baptiste Planckaert (BEL)
21 June	Dwars door het Hageland	Kenneth Vanbilsen (BEL)	Cofidis	Niki Terpstra (NED)
26 June	Halle–Ingooigem	Dries De Bondt (BEL)	Corendon–Circus	Niki Terpstra (NED)
25 August	Schaal Sels	Attilio Viviani (ITA)	Cofidis	Niki Terpstra (NED)
20 September	Kampioenschap van Vlaanderen	Jannik Steimle (GER)	Deceuninck–Quick-Step	Baptiste Planckaert (BEL)
13 October	Memorial Rik Van Steenbergen	Dries De Bondt (BEL)	Corendon–Circus	Baptiste Planckaert (BEL)

== Race results ==
=== Grote Prijs Jean-Pierre Monseré ===
Race cancelled due to storm.

=== Grote Prijs Marcel Kint ===
Result
Rank	Rider	Team	Time
1	Bryan Coquard (FRA)	Vital Concept–B&B Hotels	4h 05' 23"
2	Nacer Bouhanni (FRA)	Cofidis	+ 0"
3	Alfdan De Decker (BEL)	Wanty–Gobert	+ 0"
4	Baptiste Planckaert (BEL)	Wallonie Bruxelles	+ 0"
5	Andreas Stokbro (DEN)	Riwal Readynez	+ 0"
6	Michael Van Staeyen (BEL)	Roompot–Charles	+ 0"
7	Alexander Krieger (GER)	Trek–Segafredo	+ 0"
8	Matteo Pelucchi (ITA)	Androni Giocattoli–Sidermec	+ 0"
9	Hugo Hofstetter (FRA)	Cofidis	+ 0"
10	Christophe Noppe (BEL)	Sport Vlaanderen–Baloise	+ 0"
11	Thomas Boudat (FRA)	Total Direct Énergie	+ 0"
12	Rob McCarthy (IRL)	Canyon dhb p/b Bloor Homes	+ 0"
13	Roy Jans (BEL)	Corendon–Circus	+ 0"
14	Arvid De Kleijn (NED)	Metec–TKH	+ 0"
15	Ryan Christensen (NZL)	Canyon dhb p/b Bloor Homes	+ 0"

=== Circuit de Wallonie ===
Result
Rank	Rider	Team	Time
1	Thomas Boudat (FRA)	Total Direct Énergie	4h 20' 18"
2	Baptiste Planckaert (BEL)	Wallonie Bruxelles	+ 0"
3	Niki Terpstra (NED)	Total Direct Énergie	+ 0"
4	Oscar Riesebeek (NED)	Roompot–Charles	+ 1"
5	Anthony Turgis (FRA)	Total Direct Énergie	+ 6"
6	Lars Oreel (NED)	Dauner–Akkon	+ 40"
7	Martijn Budding (NED)	Canyon dhb p/b Bloor Homes	+ 40"
8	Tom Stewart (GBR)	Canyon dhb p/b Bloor Homes	+ 40"
9	Arjen Livyns (BEL)	Roompot–Charles	+ 40"
10	Emīls Liepiņš (LAT)	Wallonie Bruxelles	+ 40"
11	Otto Vergaerde (BEL)	Corendon–Circus	+ 40"
12	Jérôme Baugnies (BEL)	Wanty–Gobert	+ 40"
13	Kévin Reza (FRA)	Vital Concept–B&B Hotels	+ 40"
14	Yves Coolen (BEL)	Canyon dhb p/b Bloor Homes	+ 40"
15	Simone Velasco (ITA)	Neri Sottoli–Selle Italia–KTM	+ 40"

=== Dwars door het Hageland ===
Result
Rank	Rider	Team	Time
1	Kenneth Vanbilsen (BEL)	Cofidis	4h 35' 38"
2	Niki Terpstra (NED)	Total Direct Énergie	+ 5"
3	Quinten Hermans (BEL)	Telenet–Fidea Lions	+ 5"
4	Loïc Vliegen (BEL)	Wanty–Gobert	+ 9"
5	Jasper Philipsen (BEL)	UAE Team Emirates	+ 9"
6	Tim Merlier (BEL)	Corendon–Circus	+ 17"
7	Jan-Willem van Schip (NED)	Roompot–Charles	+ 21"
8	Lionel Taminiaux (BEL)	Wallonie Bruxelles	+ 31"
9	Gianni Vermeersch (BEL)	Corendon–Circus	+ 1' 33"
10	Timothy Dupont (BEL)	Wanty–Gobert	+ 1' 33"
11	Corné van Kessel (NED)	Telenet–Fidea Lions	+ 1' 33"
12	Bert De Backer (BEL)	Vital Concept–B&B Hotels	+ 1' 33"
13	Oliviero Troia (ITA)	UAE Team Emirates	+ 1' 33"
14	Jesper Asselman (NED)	Roompot–Charles	+ 1' 33"
15	Piotr Havik (NED)	Canyon dhb p/b Bloor Homes	+ 1' 33"

=== Halle–Ingooigem ===
Result
Rank	Rider	Team	Time
1	Dries De Bondt (BEL)	Corendon–Circus	4h 34' 01"
2	Piotr Havik (NED)	Canyon dhb p/b Bloor Homes	+ 0"
3	Philippe Gilbert (BEL)	Deceuninck–Quick-Step	+ 3"
4	Hugo Hofstetter (FRA)	Cofidis	+ 3"
5	Boris Vallée (BEL)	Wanty–Gobert	+ 3"
6	Lionel Taminiaux (BEL)	Wallonie Bruxelles	+ 3"
7	Jonas Koch (GER)	CCC Team	+ 3"
8	Piet Allegaert (BEL)	Sport Vlaanderen–Baloise	+ 3"
9	Michael Freiberg (AUS)	Pro Racing Sunshine Coast	+ 3"
10	Kelland O'Brien (AUS)	Pro Racing Sunshine Coast	+ 3"
11	Pieter Vanspeybrouck (BEL)	Wanty–Gobert	+ 3"
12	Boy van Poppel (NED)	Roompot–Charles	+ 3"
13	Dennis Coenen (BEL)	Cibel–Cebon	+ 3"
14	Amaury Capiot (BEL)	Sport Vlaanderen–Baloise	+ 3"
15	Wouter Wippert (NED)	EvoPro Racing	+ 3"

== Cup standings ==
Standings complete until after the Schaal Sels.

Pos.	Rider	Team	Points
1	Niki Terpstra (NED)	Total Direct Énergie	33
2	Baptiste Planckaert (BEL)	Wallonie Bruxelles	32
3	Michael Van Staeyen (BEL)	Roompot–Charles	26
4	Thomas Boudat (FRA)	Total Direct Énergie	21
5	Timothy Dupont (BEL)	Wanty–Gobert	20
6	Dries De Bondt (BEL)	Corendon–Circus	19
7	Hugo Hofstetter (FRA)	Cofidis	19
8	Oscar Riesebeek (NED)	Roompot–Charles	18
9	Lionel Taminiaux (BEL)	Wallonie Bruxelles	18
10	Piotr Havik (NED)	Canyon dhb p/b Bloor Homes	17
