= 2017 BinckBank Tour =

Cycling race

2017 UCI World Tour, race 29 of 37

Race details
- Dates: 7–13 August 2017
- Stages: 7
- Distance: 1,090.7 km (677.7 mi)
- Winning time: 24h 34' 33"

Results
| Jersey awarded to the overall winner | Winner | Tom Dumoulin (NED) | (Team Sunweb) |
| | Second | Tim Wellens (BEL) | (Lotto–Soudal) |
| | Third | Jasper Stuyven (BEL) | (Trek–Segafredo) |
| Jersey awarded to the sprints classification winner | Sprints | Peter Sagan (SVK) | (Bora–Hansgrohe) |
| Jersey awarded to the combativity classification winner | Combativity | Piet Allegaert (BEL) | (Sport Vlaanderen–Baloise) |
| | Team | Trek–Segafredo | |

The 2017 BinckBank Tour was a road cycling stage race that took place between 7 and 13 August in the Netherlands and Belgium. It was a continuation of the Eneco Tour but was renamed following a change in title sponsor. As such, it was the 13th edition, the first one under the name BinckBank Tour. It was also the 29th event of the 2017 UCI World Tour. It was won by Tom Dumoulin.

== Teams ==
All UCI WorldTeam were invited as the race is part of the UCI World Tour. The race organisation also gave out wildcards to four UCI Professional Continental teams.

UCI World Tour teams

- AG2R La Mondiale
- Astana
- Bahrain–Merida
- BMC Racing Team
- Bora–Hansgrohe
- Cannondale–Drapac
- Team Dimension Data
- FDJ
- Team Katusha–Alpecin
- LottoNL–Jumbo
- Lotto–Soudal
- Movistar Team
- Orica–Scott
- Quick-Step Floors
- Team Sky
- Team Sunweb
- Trek–Segafredo
- UAE Team Emirates

Professional Continental teams

- Roompot–Nederlandse Loterij
- Sport Vlaanderen–Baloise
- Vérandas Willems–Crelan
- Wanty–Groupe Gobert

== Schedule ==
The course for the race was announced in May 2017.

| Stage | Date | Route | Distance | Type | Winner |
|---|---|---|---|---|---|
| 1 | 7 August | Breda (Netherlands) to Venray (Netherlands) | 169.8 km (106 mi) | Flat stage | Peter Sagan (SVK) |
| 2 | 8 August | Voorburg (Netherlands) to Voorburg (Netherlands) | 9 km (6 mi) | Individual time trial | Stefan Küng (SUI) |
| 3 | 9 August | Blankenberge (Belgium) to Ardooie (Belgium) | 185 km (115 mi) | Flat stage | Peter Sagan (SVK) |
| 4 | 10 August | Lanaken (Belgium) to Lanaken (Belgium) | 154.2 km (96 mi) | Flat stage | Edward Theuns (BEL) |
| 5 | 11 August | Sittard-Geleen (Netherlands) to Sittard-Geleen (Netherlands) | 167.3 km (104 mi) | Hilly stage | Lars Boom (NED) |
| 6 | 12 August | Riemst (Belgium) to Houffalize (Belgium) | 203.7 km (127 mi) | Hilly stage | Tim Wellens (BEL) |
| 7 | 13 August | Essen (Belgium) to Geraardsbergen (Belgium) | 191.3 km (119 mi) | Hilly stage | Jasper Stuyven (BEL) |

== Stages ==
=== Stage 1 ===
7 August 2017 – Breda to Venray, 169.8 km (105.5 mi)

Stage 1 result
| Rank | Rider | Team | Time |
|---|---|---|---|
| 1 | Peter Sagan (SVK) | Bora–Hansgrohe | 3h 50' 09" |
| 2 | Phil Bauhaus (GER) | Team Sunweb | + 0" |
| 3 | Magnus Cort (DEN) | Orica–Scott | + 0" |
| 4 | Dylan Groenewegen (NED) | LottoNL–Jumbo | + 0" |
| 5 | Boy van Poppel (NED) | Trek–Segafredo | + 0" |
| 6 | Rick Zabel (GER) | Team Katusha–Alpecin | + 0" |
| 7 | Wouter Wippert (NED) | Cannondale–Drapac | + 0" |
| 8 | Jonas Rickaert (BEL) | Sport Vlaanderen–Baloise | + 0" |
| 9 | André Greipel (GER) | Lotto–Soudal | + 0" |
| 10 | Edward Planckaert (BEL) | Sport Vlaanderen–Baloise | + 0" |

General classification after Stage 1
| Rank | Rider | Team | Time |
|---|---|---|---|
| 1 | Peter Sagan (SVK) | Bora–Hansgrohe | 3h 49' 59" |
| 2 | Laurens De Vreese (BEL) | Astana | + 1" |
| 3 | Phil Bauhaus (GER) | Team Sunweb | + 4" |
| 4 | Elmar Reinders (NED) | Roompot–Nederlandse Loterij | + 5" |
| 5 | Magnus Cort (DEN) | Orica–Scott | + 6" |
| 6 | Mark McNally (GBR) | Wanty–Groupe Gobert | + 6" |
| 7 | Dylan Groenewegen (NED) | LottoNL–Jumbo | + 10" |
| 8 | Boy van Poppel (NED) | Trek–Segafredo | + 10" |
| 9 | Rick Zabel (GER) | Team Katusha–Alpecin | + 10" |
| 10 | Wouter Wippert (NED) | Cannondale–Drapac | + 10" |

=== Stage 2 ===
8 August 2017 – Voorburg, 9 km (5.6 mi), individual time trial (ITT)

Stage 2 result
| Rank | Rider | Team | Time |
|---|---|---|---|
| 1 | Stefan Küng (SUI) | BMC Racing Team | 10' 58" |
| 2 | Maciej Bodnar (POL) | Bora–Hansgrohe | + 4" |
| 3 | Tom Dumoulin (NED) | Team Sunweb | + 5" |
| 4 | Søren Kragh Andersen (DEN) | Team Sunweb | + 8" |
| 5 | Lars Boom (NED) | LottoNL–Jumbo | + 10" |
| 6 | Yves Lampaert (BEL) | Quick-Step Floors | + 12" |
| 7 | Matthias Brändle (AUT) | Trek–Segafredo | + 14" |
| 8 | Miles Scotson (AUS) | BMC Racing Team | + 15" |
| 9 | Tim Wellens (BEL) | Lotto–Soudal | + 17" |
| 10 | Jos van Emden (NED) | LottoNL–Jumbo | + 17" |

General classification after Stage 2
| Rank | Rider | Team | Time |
|---|---|---|---|
| 1 | Stefan Küng (SUI) | BMC Racing Team | 4h 01' 07" |
| 2 | Maciej Bodnar (POL) | Bora–Hansgrohe | + 4" |
| 3 | Tom Dumoulin (NED) | Team Sunweb | + 5" |
| 4 | Søren Kragh Andersen (DEN) | Team Sunweb | + 8" |
| 5 | Lars Boom (NED) | LottoNL–Jumbo | + 10" |
| 6 | Yves Lampaert (BEL) | Quick-Step Floors | + 12" |
| 7 | Matthias Brändle (AUT) | Trek–Segafredo | + 14" |
| 8 | Peter Sagan (SVK) | Bora–Hansgrohe | + 15" |
| 9 | Miles Scotson (AUS) | BMC Racing Team | + 15" |
| 10 | Tim Wellens (BEL) | Lotto–Soudal | + 17" |

=== Stage 3 ===
9 August 2017 – Blankenberge to Ardooie, 185 km (115.0 mi)

Stage 3 result
| Rank | Rider | Team | Time |
|---|---|---|---|
| 1 | Peter Sagan (SVK) | Bora–Hansgrohe | 4h 14' 01" |
| 2 | Edward Theuns (BEL) | Trek–Segafredo | + 0" |
| 3 | Rudy Barbier (FRA) | AG2R La Mondiale | + 0" |
| 4 | Dylan Groenewegen (NED) | LottoNL–Jumbo | + 0" |
| 5 | Loïc Vliegen (BEL) | BMC Racing Team | + 0" |
| 6 | Magnus Cort (DEN) | Orica–Scott | + 0" |
| 7 | Jonas Rickaert (BEL) | Sport Vlaanderen–Baloise | + 0" |
| 8 | Simone Consonni (ITA) | UAE Team Emirates | + 0" |
| 9 | Bert Van Lerberghe (BEL) | Sport Vlaanderen–Baloise | + 0" |
| 10 | Phil Bauhaus (GER) | Team Sunweb | + 0" |

General classification after Stage 3
| Rank | Rider | Team | Time |
|---|---|---|---|
| 1 | Stefan Küng (SUI) | BMC Racing Team | 8h 15' 08" |
| 2 | Maciej Bodnar (POL) | Bora–Hansgrohe | + 4" |
| 3 | Tom Dumoulin (NED) | Team Sunweb | + 5" |
| 4 | Peter Sagan (SVK) | Bora–Hansgrohe | + 5" |
| 5 | Søren Kragh Andersen (DEN) | Team Sunweb | + 8" |
| 6 | Lars Boom (NED) | LottoNL–Jumbo | + 10" |
| 7 | Yves Lampaert (BEL) | Quick-Step Floors | + 12" |
| 8 | Matthias Brändle (AUT) | Trek–Segafredo | + 14" |
| 9 | Miles Scotson (AUS) | BMC Racing Team | + 15" |
| 10 | Tim Wellens (BEL) | Lotto–Soudal | + 17" |

=== Stage 4 ===
10 August 2017 – Lanaken to Lanaken, 154.2 km (95.8 mi)

Stage 4 result
| Rank | Rider | Team | Time |
|---|---|---|---|
| 1 | Edward Theuns (BEL) | Trek–Segafredo | 3h 24' 23" |
| 2 | Marko Kump (SLO) | UAE Team Emirates | + 0" |
| 3 | Tim Merlier (BEL) | Vérandas Willems–Crelan | + 0" |
| 4 | Peter Sagan (SVK) | Bora–Hansgrohe | + 0" |
| 5 | Dylan Groenewegen (NED) | LottoNL–Jumbo | + 0" |
| 6 | Danny van Poppel (NED) | Team Sky | + 0" |
| 7 | Magnus Cort (DEN) | Orica–Scott | + 0" |
| 8 | Marc Sarreau (FRA) | FDJ | + 0" |
| 9 | Phil Bauhaus (GER) | Team Sunweb | + 0" |
| 10 | Sep Vanmarcke (BEL) | Cannondale–Drapac | + 0" |

General classification after Stage 4
| Rank | Rider | Team | Time |
|---|---|---|---|
| 1 | Stefan Küng (SUI) | BMC Racing Team | 11h 39' 31" |
| 2 | Maciej Bodnar (POL) | Bora–Hansgrohe | + 4" |
| 3 | Tom Dumoulin (NED) | Team Sunweb | + 5" |
| 4 | Peter Sagan (SVK) | Bora–Hansgrohe | + 5" |
| 5 | Søren Kragh Andersen (DEN) | Team Sunweb | + 8" |
| 6 | Lars Boom (NED) | LottoNL–Jumbo | + 10" |
| 7 | Yves Lampaert (BEL) | Quick-Step Floors | + 12" |
| 8 | Matthias Brändle (AUT) | Trek–Segafredo | + 14" |
| 9 | Edward Theuns (BEL) | Trek–Segafredo | + 17" |
| 10 | Tim Wellens (BEL) | Lotto–Soudal | + 17" |

=== Stage 5 ===
11 August 2017 – Sittard-Geleen to Sittard-Geleen, 167.3 km (104.0 mi)

Stage 5 result
| Rank | Rider | Team | Time |
|---|---|---|---|
| 1 | Lars Boom (NED) | LottoNL–Jumbo | 3h 43' 46" |
| 2 | Peter Sagan (SVK) | Bora–Hansgrohe | + 3" |
| 3 | Greg Van Avermaet (BEL) | BMC Racing Team | + 3" |
| 4 | Oliver Naesen (BEL) | AG2R La Mondiale | + 3" |
| 5 | Jasper Stuyven (BEL) | Trek–Segafredo | + 3" |
| 6 | Philippe Gilbert (BEL) | Quick-Step Floors | + 3" |
| 7 | Sep Vanmarcke (BEL) | Cannondale–Drapac | + 3" |
| 8 | Tim Wellens (BEL) | Lotto–Soudal | + 3" |
| 9 | Danny van Poppel (NED) | Team Sky | + 3" |
| 10 | Jasha Sütterlin (GER) | Movistar Team | + 3" |

General classification after Stage 5
| Rank | Rider | Team | Time |
|---|---|---|---|
| 1 | Lars Boom (NED) | LottoNL–Jumbo | 15h 23' 17" |
| 2 | Peter Sagan (SVK) | Bora–Hansgrohe | + 2" |
| 3 | Tom Dumoulin (NED) | Team Sunweb | + 8" |
| 4 | Tim Wellens (BEL) | Lotto–Soudal | + 19" |
| 5 | Jasha Sütterlin (GER) | Movistar Team | + 27" |
| 6 | Greg Van Avermaet (BEL) | BMC Racing Team | + 27" |
| 7 | Philippe Gilbert (BEL) | Quick-Step Floors | + 29" |
| 8 | Petr Vakoč (CZE) | Quick-Step Floors | + 32" |
| 9 | Jens Keukeleire (BEL) | Orica–Scott | + 35" |
| 10 | Jasper Stuyven (BEL) | Trek–Segafredo | + 36" |

=== Stage 6 ===
12 August 2017 – Riemst to Houffalize, 203.7 km (126.6 mi)

Stage 6 result
| Rank | Rider | Team | Time |
|---|---|---|---|
| 1 | Tim Wellens (BEL) | Lotto–Soudal | 5h 04' 36" |
| 2 | Tom Dumoulin (NED) | Team Sunweb | + 0" |
| 3 | Jasper Stuyven (BEL) | Trek–Segafredo | + 17" |
| 4 | Greg Van Avermaet (BEL) | BMC Racing Team | + 17" |
| 5 | Tiesj Benoot (BEL) | Lotto–Soudal | + 17" |
| 6 | Michael Valgren (DEN) | Astana | + 20" |
| 7 | Oliver Naesen (BEL) | AG2R La Mondiale | + 20" |
| 8 | Nils Politt (GER) | Team Katusha–Alpecin | + 1' 42" |
| 9 | Sep Vanmarcke (BEL) | Cannondale–Drapac | + 1' 42" |
| 10 | Dion Smith (NZL) | Wanty–Groupe Gobert | + 1' 42" |

General classification after Stage 6
| Rank | Rider | Team | Time |
|---|---|---|---|
| 1 | Tom Dumoulin (NED) | Team Sunweb | 20h 27' 49" |
| 2 | Tim Wellens (BEL) | Lotto–Soudal | + 4" |
| 3 | Greg Van Avermaet (BEL) | BMC Racing Team | + 46" |
| 4 | Jasper Stuyven (BEL) | Trek–Segafredo | + 52" |
| 5 | Michael Valgren (DEN) | Astana | + 1' 02" |
| 6 | Oliver Naesen (BEL) | AG2R La Mondiale | + 1' 09" |
| 7 | Lars Boom (NED) | LottoNL–Jumbo | + 1' 46" |
| 8 | Peter Sagan (SVK) | Bora–Hansgrohe | + 1' 48" |
| 9 | Jasha Sütterlin (GER) | Movistar Team | + 2' 13" |
| 10 | Philippe Gilbert (BEL) | Quick-Step Floors | + 2' 15" |

=== Stage 7 ===
13 August 2017 – Essen to Geraardsbergen, 191.3 km (118.9 mi)

Stage 6 result
| Rank | Rider | Team | Time |
|---|---|---|---|
| 1 | Jasper Stuyven (BEL) | Trek–Segafredo | 4h 06' 48" |
| 2 | Philippe Gilbert (BEL) | Quick-Step Floors | + 1" |
| 3 | Tom Dumoulin (NED) | Team Sunweb | + 1" |
| 4 | Peter Sagan (SVK) | Bora–Hansgrohe | + 1" |
| 5 | Tiesj Benoot (BEL) | Lotto–Soudal | + 1" |
| 6 | Oliver Naesen (BEL) | AG2R La Mondiale | + 1" |
| 7 | Greg Van Avermaet (BEL) | BMC Racing Team | + 1" |
| 8 | Matthieu Ladagnous (FRA) | FDJ | + 1" |
| 9 | Dion Smith (NZL) | Wanty–Groupe Gobert | + 1" |
| 10 | Dylan van Baarle (NED) | Cannondale–Drapac | + 1" |

Final general classification
| Rank | Rider | Team | Time |
|---|---|---|---|
| 1 | Tom Dumoulin (NED) | Team Sunweb | 24h 34' 33" |
| 2 | Tim Wellens (BEL) | Lotto–Soudal | + 17" |
| 3 | Jasper Stuyven (BEL) | Trek–Segafredo | + 46" |
| 4 | Greg Van Avermaet (BEL) | BMC Racing Team | + 51" |
| 5 | Oliver Naesen (BEL) | AG2R La Mondiale | + 1' 14" |
| 6 | Michael Valgren (DEN) | Astana | + 1' 15" |
| 7 | Peter Sagan (SVK) | Bora–Hansgrohe | + 1' 53" |
| 8 | Lars Boom (NED) | LottoNL–Jumbo | + 1' 59" |
| 9 | Philippe Gilbert (BEL) | Quick-Step Floors | + 2' 12" |
| 10 | Petr Vakoč (CZE) | Quick-Step Floors | + 2' 23" |

== Classification leadership table ==
There are four principal classifications in the race. The first of these is the general classification, calculated by adding up the time each rider took to ride each stage. Time bonuses are applied for winning stages (10, 6 and 4 seconds to the first three riders) and for the three "golden kilometre" sprints on each stage. At each of these sprints, the first three riders are given 3-, 2- and 1-second bonuses respectively. The rider with the lowest cumulative time is the winner of the general classification. The rider leading the classification wins a green jersey.

There is also a points classification. On each road stage the riders are awarded points for finishing in the top 10 places, with other points awarded for intermediate sprints. The rider with the most accumulated points is the leader of the classification and wins the blue jersey. The combativity classification is based solely on points won at the intermediate sprints; the leading rider wins the black jersey. The final classification is a team classification: on each stage the times of the best three riders on each team are added up. The team with the lowest cumulative time over the seven stages wins the team classification.

| Stage | Winner | General classification | Points classification | Combativity classification | Team classification |
|---|---|---|---|---|---|
| 1 | Peter Sagan | Peter Sagan | Peter Sagan | Piet Allegaert | Sport Vlaanderen–Baloise |
| 2 | Stefan Küng | Stefan Küng | Stefan Küng | Piet Allegaert | BMC Racing Team |
| 3 | Peter Sagan | Stefan Küng | Peter Sagan | Piet Allegaert | BMC Racing Team |
| 4 | Edward Theuns | Stefan Küng | Peter Sagan | Piet Allegaert | BMC Racing Team |
| 5 | Lars Boom | Lars Boom | Peter Sagan | Piet Allegaert | Quick-Step Floors |
| 6 | Tim Wellens | Tom Dumoulin | Peter Sagan | Piet Allegaert | Lotto–Soudal |
| 7 | Jasper Stuyven | Tom Dumoulin | Peter Sagan | Piet Allegaert | Trek–Segafredo |
| Final | | Tom Dumoulin | Peter Sagan | Piet Allegaert | Trek–Segafredo |
