= 2021 Dwars door het Hageland =

Cycling race

2021 UCI Europe Tour 2021 UCI ProSeries
- Event poster with previous winner Jonas Rickaert centered

Race details
- Dates: 5 June 2021
- Stages: 1
- Distance: 180 km (111.8 mi)
- Winning time: 3h 58' 27"

Results
	Winner	Rasmus Tiller (NOR)	(Uno-X Pro Cycling Team)
	Second	Danny van Poppel (NED)	(Intermarché–Wanty–Gobert Matériaux)
	Third	Yves Lampaert (BEL)	(Deceuninck–Quick-Step)

The 2021 Dwars door het Hageland was the 16th edition of the Dwars door het Hageland road cycling one-day race, which was held on 5 June 2021 in the Belgian province of Flemish Brabant. It was a 1.Pro event on the 2021 UCI Europe Tour and the 2021 UCI ProSeries calendars, and the fourth event of the 2021 Belgian Road Cycling Cup. The race was 180 kilometres (110 mi) long, starting in Aarschot and finishing in Diest, and featured 14 cobbled sectors and short, steep climbs each.

== Teams ==
Four of the nineteen UCI WorldTeams, eight UCI ProTeams, and eight UCI Continental teams made up the twenty teams that participated in the race. Cofidis, Deceuninck–Quick-Step, and Riwal Cycling Team were the only teams to not field a full squad of seven riders; they each entered six riders. Israel Start-Up Nation were originally invited, but they withdrew due to a COVID-19 outbreak among their staff members. Of the 137 riders to start the race, 75 finished.

UCI WorldTeams

- Cofidis
- Deceuninck–Quick-Step
- Intermarché–Wanty–Gobert Matériaux
- ~~Israel Start-Up Nation~~ (Withdrawn)
- Team DSM

UCI ProTeams

- Alpecin–Fenix
- Arkéa–Samsic
- B&B Hotels p/b KTM
- Bingoal Pauwels Sauces WB
- Sport Vlaanderen–Baloise
- Team Novo Nordisk
- Total Direct Énergie
- Uno-X Pro Cycling Team

UCI Continental Teams

- Baloise–Trek Lions
- BEAT Cycling
- Lviv Cycling Team
- Pauwels Sauzen–Bingoal
- Riwal Cycling Team
- Tarteletto–Isorex
- VolkerWessels Cycling Team
- Xelliss–Roubaix–Lille Métropole

== Result ==
Result
Rank	Rider	Team	Time
1	Rasmus Tiller (NOR)	Uno-X Pro Cycling Team	3h 58' 27"
2	Danny van Poppel (NED)	Intermarché–Wanty–Gobert Matériaux	+ 1"
3	Yves Lampaert (BEL)	Deceuninck–Quick-Step	+ 2"
4	Jonas Rickaert (BEL)	Alpecin–Fenix	+ 2"
5	Piet Allegaert (BEL)	Cofidis	+ 2"
6	Connor Swift (GBR)	Arkéa–Samsic	+ 5"
7	Boy van Poppel (NED)	Intermarché–Wanty–Gobert Matériaux	+ 16"
8	Dries Van Gestel (BEL)	Total Direct Énergie	+ 47"
9	Tim Merlier (BEL)	Alpecin–Fenix	+ 51"
10	Kristoffer Halvorsen (NOR)	Uno-X Pro Cycling Team	+ 51"
