= 2021 Grote Prijs Jef Scherens =

2021 UCI Europe Tour

Race details
- Dates: 15 August 2021
- Stages: 1
- Distance: 190 km (120 mi)

Results
	Winner	Niccolò Bonifazio (ITA)	(Team TotalEnergies)
	Second	Nacer Bouhanni (FRA)	(Arkéa–Samsic)
	Third	Gianni Vermeersch (BEL)	(Alpecin–Fenix)

The 2021 Grote Prijs Jef Scherens was the 54th edition of the Grote Prijs Jef Scherens road cycling one day race in and around Leuven. It was held on 15 August 2021 as a 1.1 categorised race and was part of the 2021 UCI Europe Tour and the 2021 Belgian Road Cycling Cup. The race course overlapped much of that of the 2021 UCI Road World Championships, which were held a few weeks later.

The defending champion was sprinter Niccolò Bonifazio, who won the 2019 edition. (There was no race in 2020 due to the COVID-19 pandemic.) Besides Bonifazio (Team TotalEnergies), other sprinters present included Tim Merlier (Alpecin–Fenix), Baptiste Planckaert (Intermarché–Wanty–Gobert Matériaux), Nacer Bouhanni (Arkéa–Samsic) and Bryan Coquard (B&B Hotels p/b KTM). It was won by the defending champion Bonifazio in the sprint.

== Teams ==
Twenty-two teams were invited to take part in the race. These included one UCI World Tour team, six UCI Professional Continental teams, and fifteen UCI Continental teams.

UCI World Tour

- Intermarché–Wanty–Gobert Matériaux

UCI Professional Continental Teams

- Alpecin–Fenix
- Arkéa–Samsic
- B&B Hotels p/b KTM
- Sport Vlaanderen–Baloise
- Bingoal Pauwels Sauces WB
- Team TotalEnergies

UCI Continental Teams

- Abloc CT
- Baloise–Trek Lions
- BEAT Cycling
- EvoPro Racing
- Hagens Berman Axeon
- Team Lotto–Kern Haus
- Lviv Cycling Team
- Massi Vivo–Conecta
- Metec–Solarwatt p/b Mantel
- SEG Racing Academy
- Tarteletto–Isorex
- Team SKS Sauerland NRW
- Trinity Racing
- VolkerWessels Cycling Team
- Yoeleo Test Team p/b 4Mind

== Result ==
Result
Rank	Rider	Team	Time
1	Niccolò Bonifazio (ITA)	Team TotalEnergies	4h 28' 12"
2	Nacer Bouhanni (FRA)	Arkéa–Samsic	+ 0"
3	Gianni Vermeersch (BEL)	Alpecin–Fenix	+ 0"
4	Tom Devriendt (BEL)	Intermarché–Wanty–Gobert Matériaux	+ 0"
5	Arne Marit (BEL)	Sport Vlaanderen–Baloise	+ 0"
6	Bram Welten (NED)	Arkéa–Samsic	+ 0"
7	Tim Merlier (BEL)	Alpecin–Fenix	+ 0"
8	Tom Paquot (BEL)	Bingoal Pauwels Sauces WB	+ 0"
9	Jens Reynders (BEL)	Sport Vlaanderen–Baloise	+ 0"
10	Cédric Beullens (BEL)	Sport Vlaanderen–Baloise	+ 0"
