= Bram Welten =

Dutch cyclist (born 1997)

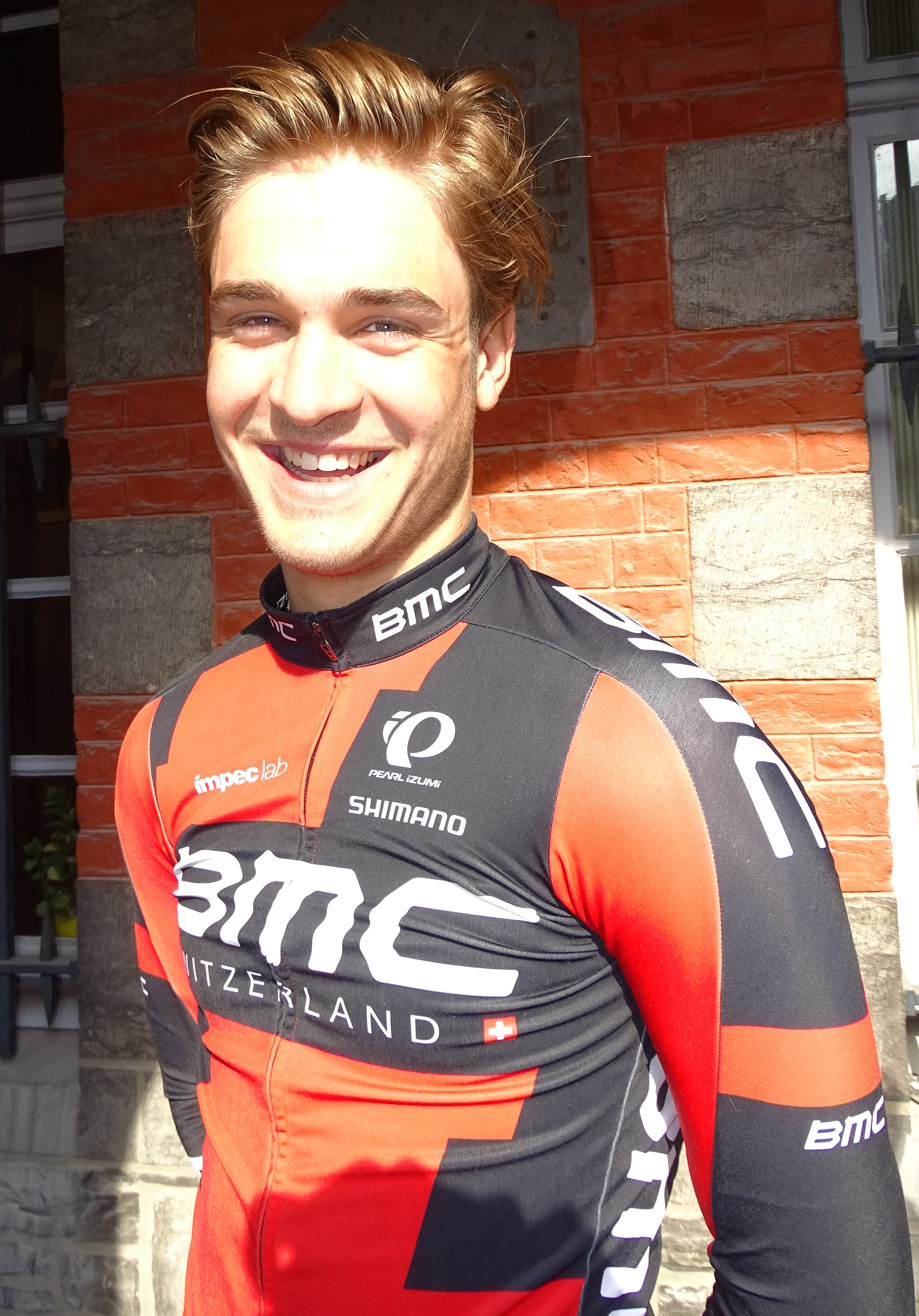
- Welten in 2016.

Personal information
- Full name: Bram Welten
- Born: 29 March 1997 (age 29) Tilburg, Netherlands
- Height: 1.88 m (6 ft 2 in)
- Weight: 81 kg (179 lb)

Cycling career
- Sport: Cycling
- Current team: Team Picnic–PostNL
- Discipline: Road
- Role: Rider

Amateur teams
- 2016–2017: BMC Development Team
- 2017: BMC Racing Team (stagiaire)

Professional teams
- 2018–2021: Fortuneo–Samsic
- 2022–2023: Groupama–FDJ
- 2024–: Team dsm–firmenich PostNL

Bram Welten (born 29 March 1997 in Tilburg) is a Dutch cyclist, who currently rides for UCI WorldTeam Team Picnic–PostNL.

== Major results ==
2014
3rd Overall Driedaagse van Axel

1st Points classification
1st Young rider classification

8th Road race, UEC European Junior Road Championships
2015
1st Paris–Roubaix Juniors
1st Guido Reybrouck Classic
1st Omloop der Vlaamse Regions
1st Stage 3 Driedaagse van Axel
3rd Menen-Kemmel-Menen
4th GP André Noyelle
2016
1st Stage 1 Le Triptyque des Monts et Châteaux
10th Paris–Chauny
2017
1st Grand Prix Criquielion
1st Stage 1 Tour de Bretagne
2nd Tour de Berne
3rd Grand Prix de la ville de Pérenchies
9th Road race, UEC European Under-23 Road Championships
2018
4th Paris–Bourges
5th Grand Prix de Denain
5th Kampioenschap van Vlaanderen
5th Omloop van het Houtland
6th Paris–Troyes
9th Scheldeprijs
2019
2nd Route Adélie
4th Cholet-Pays de Loire
8th Nokere Koerse
8th Grand Prix de Denain
2020
6th Antwerp Port Epic
2021
1st Tour de Vendée
4th La Roue Tourangelle
4th Grand Prix d'Isbergues
4th Grote Prijs Marcel Kint
5th Ronde van Limburg
5th Druivenkoers Overijse
6th Grote Prijs Jef Scherens
8th Bredene Koksijde Classic
8th Tro-Bro Léon
2022
5th Nokere Koerse
6th La Roue Tourangelle
7th Brussels Cycling Classic
8th Egmont Cycling Race
10th Grand Prix de Denain
2023
8th Tour de Vendée

=== Grand Tour general classification results timeline ===
Grand Tour	2024	2025
Giro d'Italia	DNF	DNF
Tour de France	DNF	—
Vuelta a España	—	—

Legend
—	Did not compete
DNF	Did not finish
