= 2020 Dwars door het Hageland =

Cycling race

2020 UCI ProSeries
- Event poster with previous winner Kenneth Vanbilsen

Race details
- Dates: 15 August 2020
- Stages: 1
- Distance: 180 km (111.8 mi)
- Winning time: 4h 20' 20"

Results
	Winner	Jonas Rickaert (BEL)	(Alpecin–Fenix)
	Second	Nils Eekhoff (NED)	(Team Sunweb)
	Third	Gianni Vermeersch (BEL)	(Alpecin–Fenix)

The 2020 Dwars door het Hageland was the 15th edition of the Dwars door het Hageland road cycling one-day race, which was held on 15 August 2020 in the Belgian province of Flemish Brabant. It was a 1.Pro event on the 2020 UCI ProSeries calendar.

== Teams ==
Four of the eighteen UCI WorldTeams, eight UCI ProTeams, and five UCI Continental teams made up the seventeen teams that participated in the race.

UCI WorldTeams

- Deceuninck–Quick-Step
- Team Jumbo–Visma
- Team Sunweb
- Trek–Segafredo

UCI ProTeams

- Alpecin–Fenix
- Arkéa–Samsic
- Bingoal–Wallonie Bruxelles
- B&B Hotels–Vital Concept
- Circus–Wanty Gobert
- Sport Vlaanderen–Baloise
- Riwal Readynez
- Total Direct Énergie

UCI Continental Teams

- à Bloc
- BEAT Cycling Club
- Pauwels Sauzen–Bingoal
- Tarteletto–Isorex
- Telenet–Baloise Lions

== Result ==
Result
Rank	Rider	Team	Time
1	Jonas Rickaert (BEL)	Alpecin–Fenix	4h 20' 20"
2	Nils Eekhoff (NED)	Team Sunweb	+ 7"
3	Gianni Vermeersch (BEL)	Alpecin–Fenix	+ 16"
4	Florian Sénéchal (FRA)	Deceuninck–Quick-Step	+ 16"
5	Tim Merlier (BEL)	Alpecin–Fenix	+ 19"
6	Benjamin Declercq (BEL)	Arkéa–Samsic	+ 23"
7	Timo Roosen (NED)	Team Jumbo–Visma	+ 23"
8	Bert-Jan Lindeman (BEL)	Team Jumbo–Visma	+ 25"
9	Toon Aerts (BEL)	Telenet–Baloise Lions	+ 26"
10	Bert De Backer (BEL)	B&B Hotels–Vital Concept	+ 26"
