= 2021 Le Samyn =

2021 UCI Europe Tour
- Poster with previous winners Hofstetter and van den Broek-Blaak

Race details
- Dates: 2 March 2021
- Stages: 1
- Distance: 205.4 km (127.6 mi)
- Winning time: 4h 34' 29"

Results
	Winner	Tim Merlier (BEL)	(Alpecin–Fenix)
	Second	Rasmus Tiller (NOR)	(Uno-X Pro Cycling Team)
	Third	Andrea Pasqualon (ITA)	(Intermarché–Wanty–Gobert Matériaux)

The 2021 Le Samyn was the 53rd edition of the Le Samyn road cycling one day race in Belgium. It was a 1.1-rated event on the 2021 UCI Europe Tour and the first event in the 2021 Belgian Road Cycling Cup. The 205.4 kilometres (127.6 mi) long race started in Quaregnon and finished in Dour, with almost four laps of a finishing circuit that featured several cobbled sections and climbs.

== Teams ==
Seven UCI WorldTeams, nine UCI ProTeams, and nine UCI Continental teams made up the twenty-five teams that participated in the race. All but five teams entered the maximum squad of seven riders; these five teams are Arkéa–Samsic, Cofidis, Delko, Leopard Pro Cycling, and Rally Cycling, each entering six riders. 125 of 170 riders finished the race.

UCI WorldTeams

- AG2R Citroën Team
- Cofidis
- Deceuninck–Quick-Step
- Intermarché–Wanty–Gobert Matériaux
- Israel Start-Up Nation
- Lotto–Soudal
- Team Qhubeka Assos

UCI ProTeams

- Alpecin–Fenix
- Arkéa–Samsic
- B&B Hotels p/b KTM
- Bingoal WB
- Delko
- Rally Cycling
- Sport Vlaanderen–Baloise
- Total Direct Énergie
- Uno-X Pro Cycling Team

UCI Continental Teams

- BEAT Cycling
- Canyon dhb SunGod
- Development Team DSM
- Équipe Continentale Groupama–FDJ
- Jumbo–Visma Development Team
- Leopard Pro Cycling
- Lviv Cycling Team
- SEG Racing Academy
- Tarteletto–Isorex

== Result ==
Result
Rank	Rider	Team	Time
1	Tim Merlier (BEL)	Alpecin–Fenix	4h 34' 29"
2	Rasmus Tiller (NOR)	Uno-X Pro Cycling Team	+ 0"
3	Andrea Pasqualon (ITA)	Intermarché–Wanty–Gobert Matériaux	+ 0"
4	Sep Vanmarcke (BEL)	Israel Start-Up Nation	+ 0"
5	Hugo Hofstetter (FRA)	Israel Start-Up Nation	+ 0"
6	Amaury Capiot (BEL)	Arkéa–Samsic	+ 0"
7	John Degenkolb (GER)	Lotto–Soudal	+ 0"
8	Dimitri Claeys (BEL)	Team Qhubeka Assos	+ 0"
9	Timothy Dupont (BEL)	Bingoal WB	+ 0"
10	Milan Menten (BEL)	Bingoal WB	+ 0"
