= Niccolò Bonifazio =

Italian cyclist (born 1993)

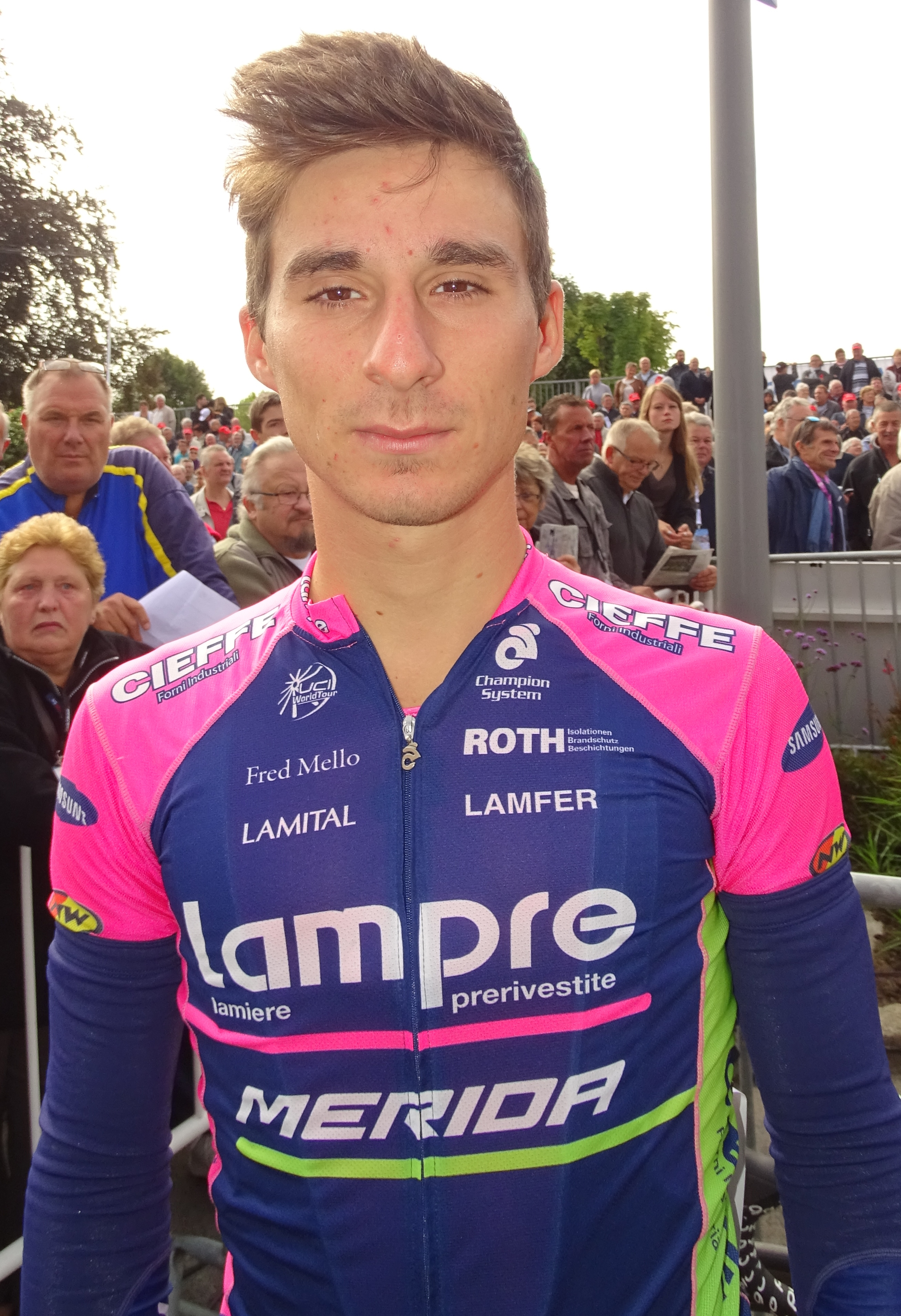
- Bonifazio in 2015

Personal information
- Full name: Niccolò Bonifazio
- Born: 9 October 1993 (age 33) Cuneo, Italy
- Height: 1.72 m (5 ft 8 in)
- Weight: 68 kg (150 lb; 10.7 st)

Cycling career
- Sport: Cycling
- Current team: Retired
- Discipline: Road
- Role: Rider
- Rider type: Sprinter

Amateur teams
- 2012–2013: GSC Viris Maserati A.S.D
- 2013: Lampre–Merida (stagiaire)

Professional teams
- 2014–2015: Lampre–Merida
- 2016: Trek–Segafredo
- 2017–2018: Bahrain–Merida
- 2019–2022: Direct Énergie
- 2023: Intermarché–Circus–Wanty
- 2024: Team Corratec–Vini Fantini

Major wins
- One-day races and Classics Gran Premio di Lugano (2015)

Niccolò Bonifazio (born 9 October 1993) is an Italian retired cyclist, who last rode for UCI ProTeam Team Corratec–Vini Fantini.

== Career ==
=== Early career ===
Bonifazio was born in Cuneo.

Bonifazio's professional career began in 2013 when he rode as a stagiaire for UCI WorldTeam Lampre–Merida. He joined the Lampre–Merida team the following year as a regular rider. In September 2014, Bonifazio took the biggest victory of his career so far by winning the Coppa Agostoni in a bunch sprint. In addition to this, he won a stage of the Tour of Japan and three stages and 2nd place of the Tour of Hainan.

In 2015, he booked another victory, the Gran Premio di Lugano, also in a sprint. Bonifazio placed 3rd in the Coppa Ugo Agostoni, which he won the preceding year. Bonifazio placed fifth in Milan–San Remo.

In August 2015 it was announced that Bonifazio would join Trek–Segafredo for the 2016 season. Bonifazio took multiple top 10 finishes, including 5th place in the Scheldeprijs, 3rd in the Cadel Evans Great Ocean Road Race and 6th in Kuurne–Brussels–Kuurne. He was named in the startlist for the Vuelta a España, but he abandoned on stage 7.

=== 2018 onwards: Grand Tours ===
In May 2018, he was named in the startlist for the Giro d'Italia. In July 2019, he was named in the startlist for the 2019 Tour de France.

== Major results ==
2010
7th Trofeo San Rocco
10th Piccola Tre Valli Varesine
2011
1st GP dell'Arno
1st Stage 3 Tour d'Istrie
2012
9th Road race, UEC European Under-23 Road Championships
2013
1st Stage 2 Coupe des nations Ville Saguenay
2014
1st Coppa Ugo Agostoni
1st Stage 6 Tour of Japan
2nd Overall Tour of Hainan

1st Points classification
1st Stages 2, 6 & 8

6th Gran Premio Bruno Beghelli
8th Coppa Sabatini
2015
1st Gran Premio di Lugano
1st Stage 7 Tour of Japan
3rd Gran Premio della Costa Etruschi
3rd Coppa Ugo Agostoni
4th Grand Prix of Aargau Canton
5th Milan–San Remo
8th Coppa Bernocchi
9th Vattenfall Cyclassics
2016
1st Stage 3 Tour de Pologne
3rd Cadel Evans Great Ocean Road Race
5th Scheldeprijs
6th Kuurne–Brussels–Kuurne
2017
3rd Grand Prix of Aargau Canton
4th Down Under Classic
2018
1st Stage 1 Tour of Croatia
9th EuroEyes Cyclassics
2019
1st Overall La Tropicale Amissa Bongo

1st Points classification
1st Stages 1, 2 & 5

1st Grote Prijs Jef Scherens
1st Omloop Mandel-Leie-Schelde
Vuelta a la Comunidad de Madrid

1st Points classification
1st Stage 1

10th Münsterland Giro
2020
1st Stage 5 Paris–Nice
1st Stage 2 Saudi Tour
2nd Scheldeprijs
2021
1st Grote Prijs Jef Scherens
2nd Egmont Cycling Race
3rd Paris–Bourges
5th Kampioenschap van Vlaanderen
7th Overall Boucles de la Mayenne
9th Coppa Bernocchi
2022
1st Stage 4 Route d'Occitanie
4th Circuit de Wallonie
9th Grote Prijs Marcel Kint
2023
1st Stage 2 Giro di Sicilia
6th Grand Prix de Fourmies

=== Grand Tour general classification results timeline ===
Grand Tour	2016	2017	2018	2019	2020	2021	2022	2023
Giro d'Italia	—	—	113	—	—	—	—	DNF
Tour de France	—	—	—	137	141	—	—	—
Vuelta a España	DNF	—	—	—	—	—	—	—

Legend
—	Did not compete
DNF	Did not finish
