= 2022 Dwars door het Hageland =

Cycling race

2022 UCI ProSeries
- Event poster with previous winners Rasmus Tiller and Chantal van den Broek-Blaak

Race details
- Dates: 11 June 2022
- Stages: 1
- Distance: 177 km (110.0 mi)
- Winning time: 4h 06' 59"

Results
	Winner	Oscar Riesebeek (NED)	(Alpecin–Fenix)
	Second	Gianni Vermeersch (BEL)	(Alpecin–Fenix)
	Third	Florian Sénéchal (FRA)	(Quick-Step Alpha Vinyl Team)

The 2022 Dwars door het Hageland was the 17th edition of the Dwars door het Hageland road cycling one-day race, which was held on 11 June 2022 in the Belgian province of Flemish Brabant. It was a 1.Pro event on the 2022 UCI ProSeries calendar.

== Teams ==
Seven of the eighteen UCI WorldTeams, six UCI ProTeams, and five UCI Continental teams made up the eighteen teams that participated in the race.

UCI WorldTeams

- Cofidis
- Intermarché–Wanty–Gobert Matériaux
- Israel–Premier Tech
- Lotto–Soudal
- Quick-Step Alpha Vinyl Team
- Team BikeExchange–Jayco
- UAE Team Emirates

UCI ProTeams

- Alpecin–Fenix
- Arkéa–Samsic
- Bingoal Pauwels Sauces WB
- B&B Hotels–KTM
- Sport Vlaanderen–Baloise
- Uno-X Pro Cycling Team

UCI Continental Teams

- Baloise–Trek Lions
- Geofco–Doltcini Matériel-vélo.com
- Minerva Cycling Team
- Pauwels Sauzen–Bingoal
- Tarteletto–Isorex

== Result ==
Result
Rank	Rider	Team	Time
1	Oscar Riesebeek (NED)	Alpecin–Fenix	4h 06' 59"
2	Gianni Vermeersch (BEL)	Alpecin–Fenix	+ 1"
3	Florian Sénéchal (FRA)	Quick-Step Alpha Vinyl Team	+ 3"
4	Stan Van Tricht (BEL)	Quick-Step Alpha Vinyl Team	+ 6"
5	Loïc Vliegen (BEL)	Intermarché–Wanty–Gobert Matériaux	+ 6"
6	Arnaud De Lie (BEL)	Lotto–Soudal	+ 6"
7	Tom Devriendt (BEL)	Intermarché–Wanty–Gobert Matériaux	+ 6"
8	Piet Allegaert (BEL)	Cofidis	+ 6"
9	Clément Russo (FRA)	Arkéa–Samsic	+ 9"
10	Rasmus Tiller (NOR)	Uno-X Pro Cycling Team	+ 9"
