= Rasmus Tiller =

Norwegian cyclist

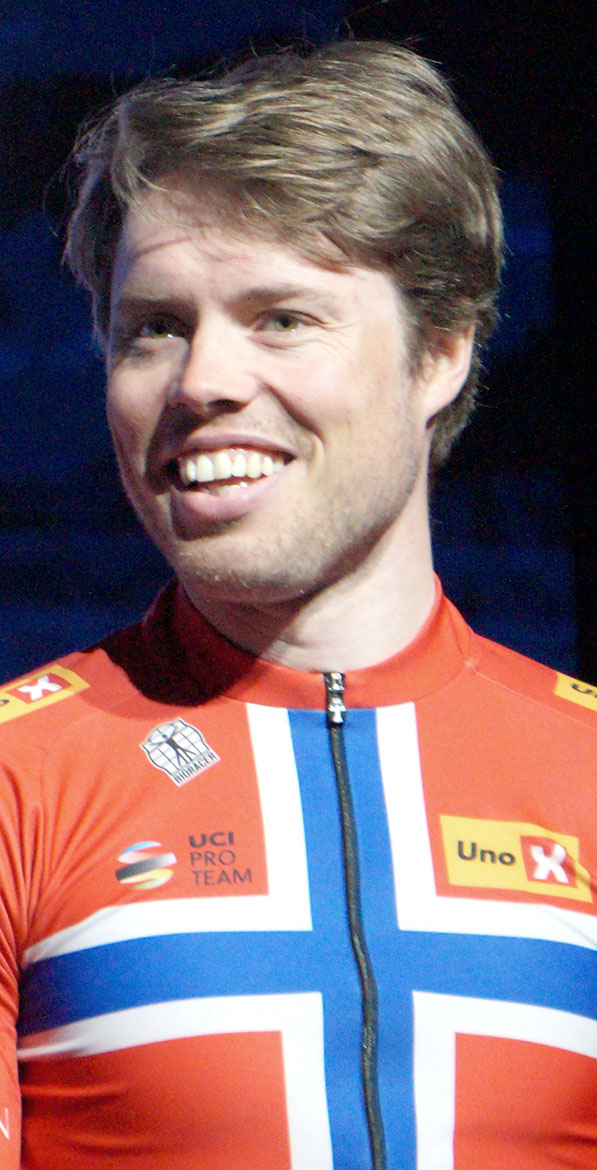
- Tiller in 2023

Personal information
- Full name: Rasmus Fossum Tiller
- Born: 28 July 1996 (age 30) Trondheim, Norway
- Height: 1.87 m (6 ft 2 in)
- Weight: 84 kg (185 lb)

Cycling career
- Sport: Cycling
- Current team: Uno-X Mobility
- Discipline: Road
- Role: Rider

Amateur team
- 2016: Team Ringeriks–Kraft (stagiaire)

Professional teams
- 2017–2018: Joker Icopal
- 2019–2020: Team Dimension Data
- 2021–: Uno-X Pro Cycling Team

Major wins
- One-day races and Classics National Road Race Championships (2017, 2022) Dwars door het Hageland (2021, 2023)

Rasmus Fossum Tiller (born 28 July 1996) is a Norwegian cyclist, who currently rides for UCI ProTeam Uno-X Mobility. In August 2019, he was named in the startlist for the 2019 Vuelta a España.

He is the son of former Norwegian professional cyclist Tone Fossum.

== Major results ==
2016
5th Road race, National Under-23 Road Championships
2017 (1 pro win)
1st Road race, National Road Championships
3rd Kattekoers
3rd Road race, National Under-23 Road Championships
5th Grote Prijs Marcel Kint
2018
1st Prologue Grand Prix Priessnitz spa
2nd Road race, National Road Championships
5th Tro-Bro Léon
2019
4th Road race, National Road Championships
2021 (1)
1st Dwars door het Hageland
2nd Le Samyn
2nd Binche–Chimay–Binche
3rd Tour du Finistère
5th Tro-Bro Léon
5th Antwerp Port Epic
6th Grand Prix de Wallonie
2022 (1)
1st Road race, National Road Championships
2nd Binche–Chimay–Binche
6th Omloop Het Nieuwsblad
6th Nokere Koerse
9th Le Samyn
10th Dwars door het Hageland
2023 (2)
1st Dwars door het Hageland
1st Stage 7 Tour of Britain
2nd Circuit Franco-Belge
2nd Druivenkoers Overijse
3rd Grand Prix du Morbihan
5th Road race, National Road Championships
5th Tro-Bro Léon
6th Road race, UEC European Road Championships
7th Overall Deutschland Tour
8th Egmont Cycling Race
2024
3rd Road race, National Road Championships
4th Dwars door het Hageland
4th Le Samyn
2025
2nd Dwars door het Hageland
4th Road race, National Road Championships
6th Muur Classic Geraardsbergen
7th Tro-Bro Léon
2026 (1)
3rd Overall Four Days of Dunkirk

1st Stage 3

5th Tro-Bro Léon
6th Muscat Classic

=== Grand Tour general classification results timeline ===
Grand Tour	2019	2020	2021	2022	2023	2024
Giro d'Italia	—	—	—	—	—	—
Tour de France	—	—	—	—	108	105
Vuelta a España	130	—	—	—	—	—

Legend
—	Did not compete
DNF	Did not finish
