= Timothy Dupont =

Belgian cyclist (born 1987)

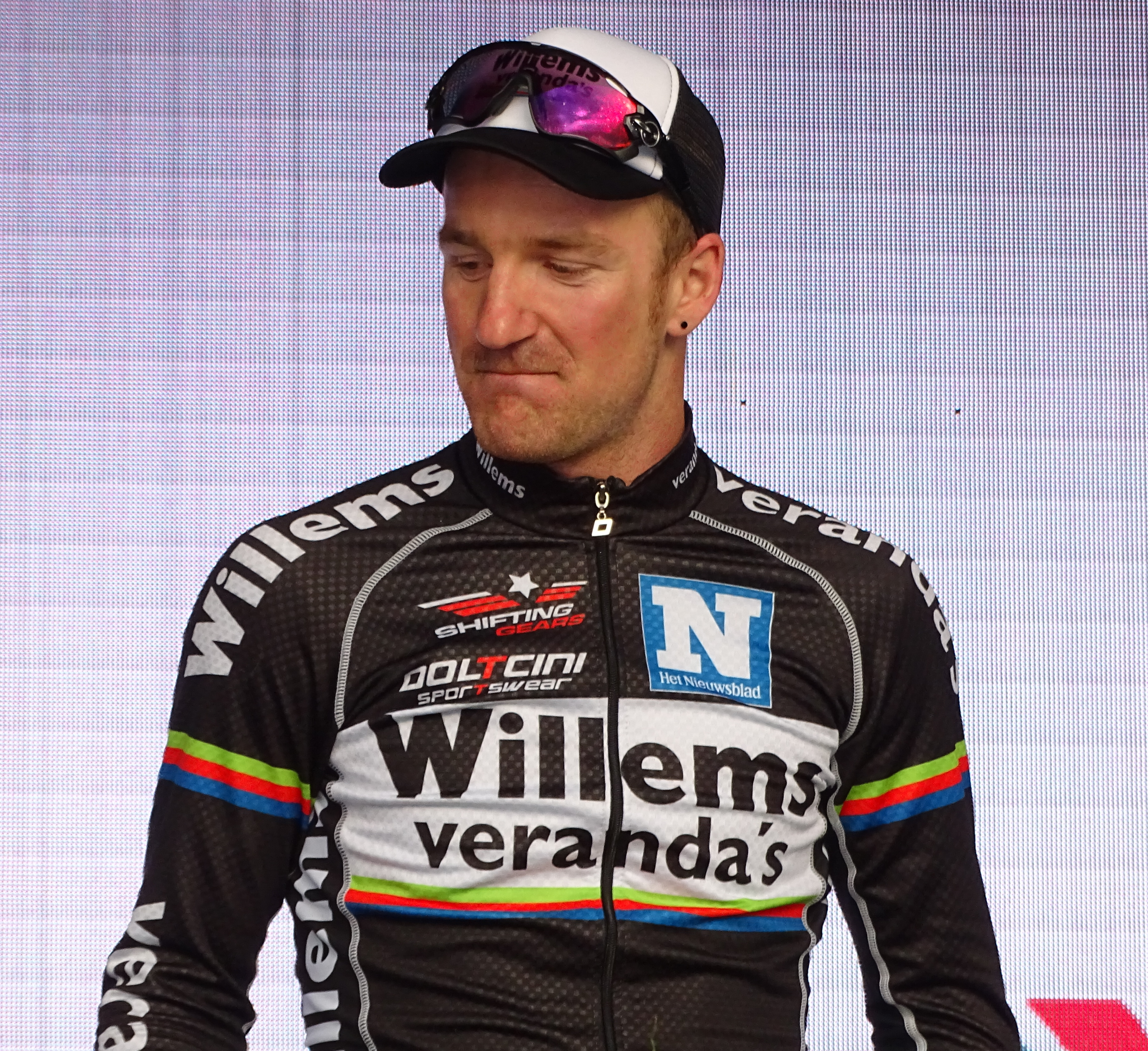
- Dupont in 2016.

Personal information
- Full name: Timothy Dupont
- Born: 1 November 1987 (age 38) Ghent, Belgium
- Height: 1.79 m (5 ft 10 1/2 in)
- Weight: 71 kg (157 lb; 11 st 3 lb)

Cycling career
- Sport: Cycling
- Current team: Tarteletto–Isorex
- Discipline: Road
- Role: Rider
- Rider type: Sprinter

Professional teams
- 2009: Jong Vlaanderen–Bauknecht (stagiair)
- 2010–2013: Jong Vlaanderen–Bauknecht
- 2014–2015: Roubaix–Lille Métropole
- 2016–2017: Verandas Willems
- 2018–2020: Wanty–Groupe Gobert
- 2021–2022: Bingoal WB
- 2023–: Tarteletto–Isorex

Major wins
- Single-day races and Classics Nokere Koerse (2016)

Timothy Dupont (born 1 November 1987 in Ghent) is a Belgian cyclist, who currently rides for UCI Continental team Tarteletto–Isorex.

== Major results ==
2010
1st Grote Prijs Stad Geel
5th Dwars door het Hageland
6th Beverbeek Classic
6th Dwars door de Antwerpse Kempen
7th Val d'Ille Classic
7th Nationale Sluitingsprijs
10th Omloop van het Houtland
10th Kampioenschap van Vlaanderen
2011
2nd Gooikse Pijl
3rd Omloop van het Waasland
6th Grote Prijs Stad Geel
9th Schaal Sels
2012
1st Road race, National Amateur Road Championships
1st Stage 4 Tour de Liège
3rd Omloop van het Houtland
5th Gooikse Pijl
5th Antwerpse Havenpijl
6th Binche–Tournai–Binche
6th Ronde van Limburg
8th Dorpenomloop Rucphen
8th Grote Prijs Stad Geel
9th Nationale Sluitingsprijs
2013
1st Overall Tweedaagse van Gaverstreek

1st Stage 2

Tour de Bretagne

1st Points classification
1st Stages 3 & 5

2nd Overall Tour du Loir-et-Cher

1st Points classification

2nd Nationale Sluitingsprijs
6th Kampioenschap van Vlaanderen
7th Druivenkoers Overijse
7th Gooikse Pijl
7th Grand Prix Criquielion
7th De Kustpijl
10th Omloop van het Houtland
10th Antwerpse Havenpijl
2014
4th Grote Prijs Jean-Pierre Monseré
2015
Tour Alsace

1st Points classification
1st Stages 2 & 4

2nd Omloop van het Houtland
3rd Route Adélie
7th Classic Loire Atlantique
8th Overall Ronde de l'Oise
9th Grand Prix de Denain
9th Halle–Ingooigem
10th Kampioenschap van Vlaanderen
2016 (3 pro wins)
1st Nokere Koerse
1st Dwars door de Vlaamse Ardennen
1st Grand Prix Criquielion
1st Grand Prix de la ville de Pérenchies
1st Antwerpse Havenpijl
1st De Kustpijl
1st Kampioenschap van Vlaanderen
1st Memorial Van Coningsloo
Tour Alsace

1st Points classification
1st Stages 1, 2 & 4

2nd Nationale Sluitingsprijs
2nd Grote Prijs Stad Zottegem
2nd Grand Prix Impanis-Van Petegem
2nd Schaal Sels
3rd Ronde van Limburg
3rd Gooikse Pijl
3rd Grote Prijs Jean-Pierre Monseré
5th Overall Tour de Normandie

1st Points classification
1st Stages 1, 3 & 6

5th Brussels Cycling Classic
6th Overall Driedaagse van West-Vlaanderen

1st Points classification
1st Stage 2

6th Binche–Chimay–Binche
7th Handzame Classic
8th Overall Paris–Arras Tour
10th Halle–Ingooigem
10th Dwars door het Hageland
2017 (1)
1st Grote Prijs Jef Scherens
3rd Nationale Sluitingsprijs
4th Grote Prijs Stad Zottegem
5th Grand Prix Pino Cerami
6th Arnhem–Veenendaal Classic
7th Halle–Ingooigem
8th Paris–Bourges
8th Handzame Classic
9th Omloop Eurometropool
9th Kampioenschap van Vlaanderen
10th Omloop van het Houtland
2018 (1)
1st Schaal Sels
3rd Clásica de Almería
3rd Grote Prijs Jef Scherens
3rd Omloop van het Houtland
6th Halle–Ingooigem
6th Primus Classic
7th Scheldeprijs
7th Elfstedenronde
8th Overall Four Days of Dunkirk

1st Points classification

8th Omloop Mandel-Leie-Schelde
8th Binche–Chimay–Binche
9th Brussels Cycling Classic
10th Kuurne–Brussels–Kuurne
10th Dwars door het Hageland
2019 (1)
1st Stage 1 Tour de Wallonie
2nd Beach race, UEC European Mountain Bike Championships
2nd Road race, National Road Championships
2nd Trofeo Palma
2nd Schaal Sels
2nd Omloop Mandel-Leie-Schelde
3rd Grand Prix de Denain
3rd Grote Prijs Jef Scherens
3rd Antwerp Port Epic
3rd Gooikse Pijl
4th Grand Prix Pino Cerami
4th Elfstedenronde
5th Bredene Koksijde Classic
5th Druivenkoers Overijse
5th Primus Classic
10th Dwars door het Hageland
2020
2nd Grote Prijs Jean-Pierre Monseré
3rd Grand Prix d'Isbergues
8th Paris–Chauny
2021 (1)
1st Stage 2 Étoile de Bessèges
3rd Grote Prijs Jean-Pierre Monseré
4th Omloop van het Houtland
5th Clásica de Almería
5th Classic Brugge–De Panne
7th Egmont Cycling Race
9th Le Samyn
2022 (1)
1st Stage 4 ZLM Toer
3rd Dorpenomloop Rucphen
5th Veenendaal–Veenendaal Classic
5th Kampioenschap van Vlaanderen
5th GP Briek Schotte
6th Bredene Koksijde Classic
2023 (3)
Tour of Qinghai Lake

1st Stages 1 & 8

3rd Gullegem Koerse
4th Arno Wallaard Memorial
4th Van Merksteijn Fences Classic
4th Omloop Mandel-Leie-Schelde
5th Overall Tour of Istanbul

1st Points classification
1st Stage 4

6th La Roue Tourangelle
7th Veenendaal–Veenendaal Classic
8th Ronde van Limburg
10th Grote Prijs Jean-Pierre Monseré
10th Overall International Tour of Hellas

1st Stage 2

10th Elfstedenronde
2024 (1)
1st Stage 1 Tour of Antalya
2nd Grote Prijs Jean-Pierre Monseré
6th Heistse Pijl
8th Bredene Koksijde Classic
9th Cholet-Pays de la Loire
2025
1st Heusden Koers
2nd Izegem Koers
3rd Omloop van het Waasland
4th Omloop van het Houtland
10th Ronde van Limburg
2026
1st Dorpenomloop Rucphen
2nd GP Vermarc

=== Grand Tour general classification results timeline ===
Grand Tour	2018
Giro d'Italia	—
Tour de France	131
Vuelta a España	—

Legend
—	Did not compete
DNF	Did not finish
