= Piet Allegaert =

Belgian cyclist

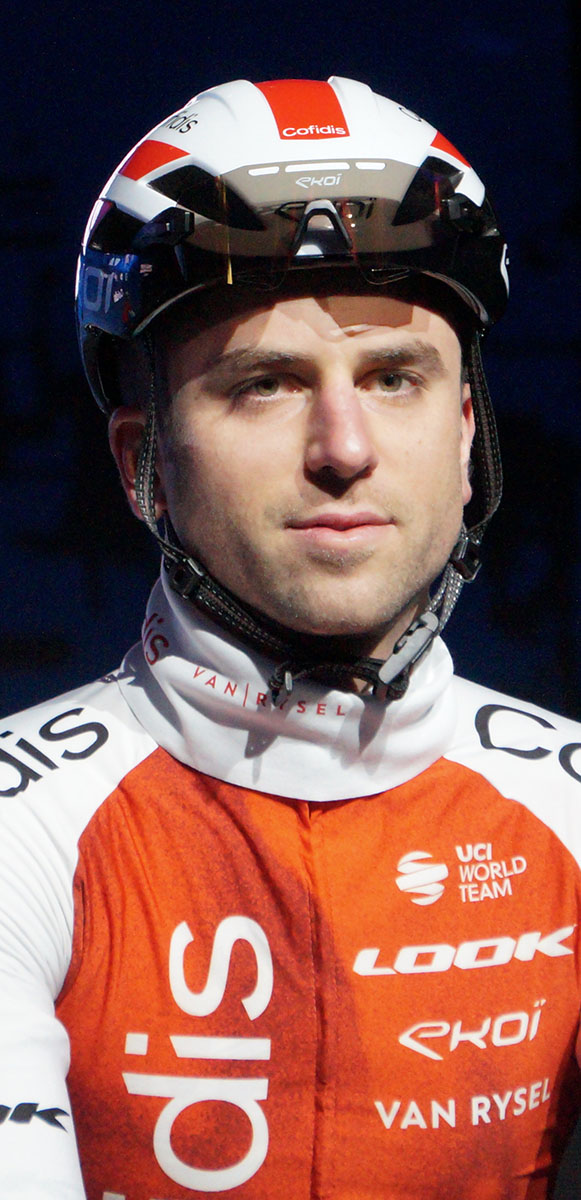
- Allegaert in 2023

Personal information
- Full name: Piet Allegaert
- Born: 20 January 1995 (age 31) Moorslede, Belgium
- Height: 1.81 m (5 ft 11 in)
- Weight: 70 kg (150 lb; 11 st)

Cycling career
- Sport: Cycling
- Current team: Cofidis
- Discipline: Road
- Role: Rider

Amateur teams
- 2010–2012: Jonge Renners Roeselare
- 2013: Avia–Crabbé
- 2014–2016: EFC–Omega Pharma–Quick-Step

Professional teams
- 2016: Trek–Segafredo (stagiaire)
- 2017–2019: Sport Vlaanderen–Baloise
- 2020–: Cofidis

Major wins
- One-day races and Classics Tour de l'Eurométropole (2019)

Piet Allegaert (born 20 January 1995) is a Belgian cyclist, who currently rides for UCI WorldTeam Cofidis.

== Career ==
Born in Moorslede, Allegaert signed with UCI Professional Continental team Sport Vlaanderen–Baloise in 2017, after riding with UCI WorldTeam Trek–Segafredo as a stagiaire the previous season. He finished in 17th place in Paris–Roubaix, his debut classic. That year, he also won the combativity classification in the BinckBank Tour.

== Major results ==
2016
7th Paris–Roubaix Espoirs
2017
1st Combativity classification, BinckBank Tour
1st Mountains classification, Three Days of De Panne
2019
1st Tour de l'Eurométropole
8th Münsterland Giro
8th Halle–Ingooigem
10th Gooikse Pijl
2020
5th Grand Prix d'Isbergues
2021
2nd Tro-Bro Léon
4th Paris–Bourges
5th Dwars door het Hageland
9th Grand Prix de Denain
2022
3rd Cholet-Pays de la Loire
4th Gooikse Pijl
5th Grote Prijs Marcel Kint
6th Memorial Rik Van Steenbergen
7th Trofeo Alcúdia – Port d'Alcúdia
7th Heistse Pijl
7th Ronde van Limburg
8th Dwars door het Hageland
9th Eschborn–Frankfurt
10th Egmont Cycling Race
2024
8th Surf Coast Classic
8th Grand Prix d'Isbergues
2025
6th Nokere Koerse
7th Omloop Het Nieuwsblad
2026
6th Kampioenschap van Vlaanderen
7th Grand Prix d'Isbergues

=== Grand Tour general classification results timeline ===
Grand Tour	2021	2022	2023	2024	2025	2026
Giro d'Italia	—	—	—	—	—	—
Tour de France	—	—	—	114	—	153
Vuelta a España	123	—	—	—	—	

Legend
—	Did not compete
DNF	Did not finish
