= Dries Van Gestel =

Belgian cyclist

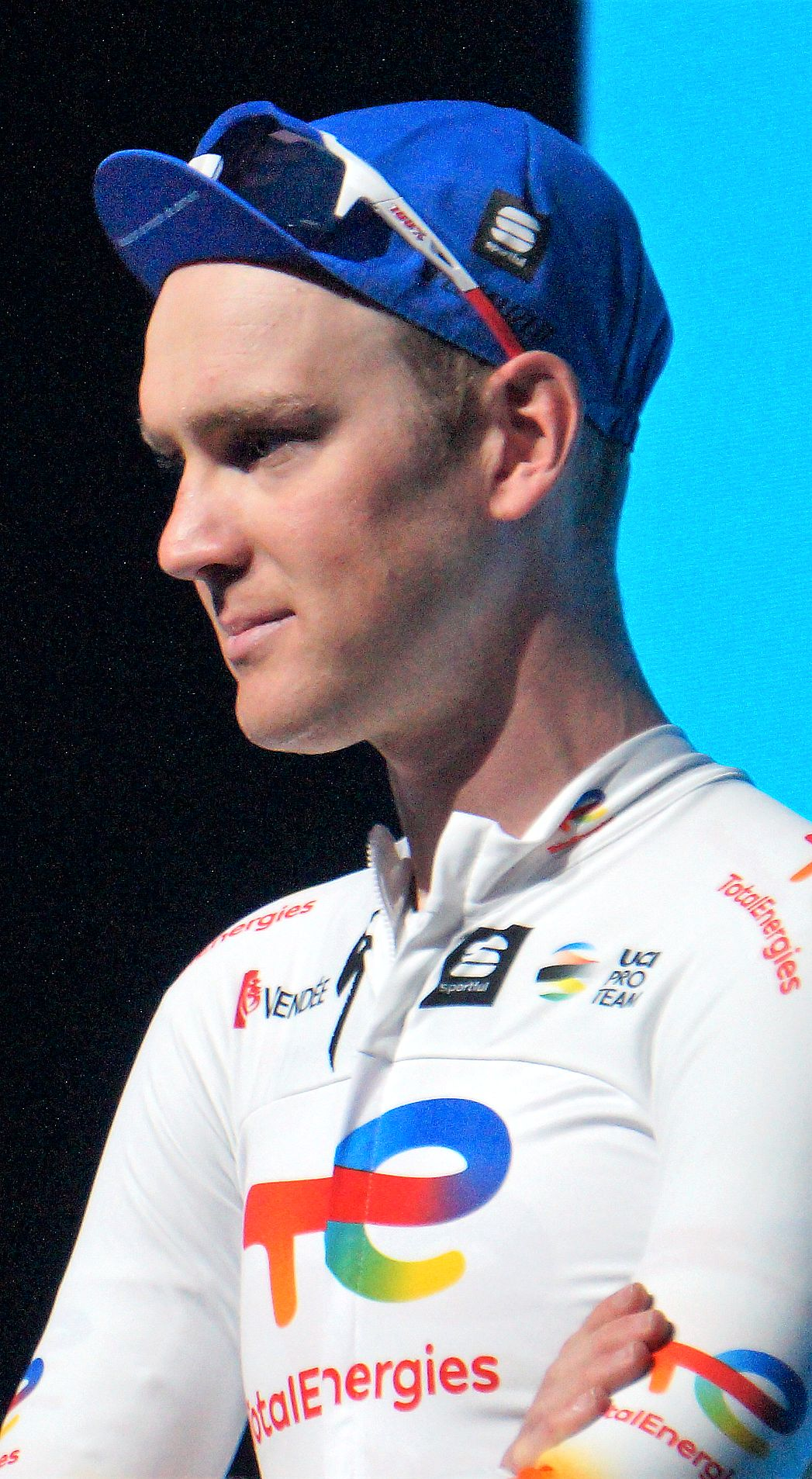
- Dries Van Gestel, 2022 Omloop Het Nieuwsblad

Personal information
- Full name: Dries Van Gestel
- Born: 30 September 1994 (age 32) Arendonk, Belgium
- Height: 1.87 m (6 ft 2 in)
- Weight: 71 kg (157 lb)

Cycling career
- Sport: Cycling
- Current team: Soudal–Quick-Step
- Discipline: Road
- Role: Rider

Amateur teams
- 2009: WSC Hand in Hand Baal
- 2012: Balen BC
- 2013–2015: Lotto–Belisol U23

Professional teams
- 2015: Lotto–Soudal (stagiaire)
- 2016–2019: Topsport Vlaanderen–Baloise
- 2020–2024: Total Direct Énergie
- 2025–: Soudal–Quick-Step

Dries Van Gestel (born 30 September 1994) is a Belgian cyclist, who currently rides for UCI WorldTeam Soudal–Quick-Step.

== Major results ==
2012
National Junior Road Championships

1st Road race
2nd Time trial

1st Remouchamps–Ferrières–Remouchamps
4th Overall Tour du Valromey
5th Overall Keizer der Juniores
8th Overall Peace Race Juniors
2014
5th Overall Course de la Paix U23
9th Overall Okolo Jižních Čech
2015
2nd Gooikse Pijl
3rd Overall Carpathian Couriers Race

1st Points classification
1st Stage 2

4th Road race, National Under-23 Road Championships
4th Paris–Tours Espoirs
4th Flèche Ardennaise
7th Memorial Van Coningsloo
2017 (1 pro win)
2nd Overall Tour des Fjords

1st Young rider classification
1st Stage 1

8th Tour de l'Eurométropole
9th Omloop Mandel-Leie-Schelde
2020
9th Kuurne–Brussels–Kuurne
10th Le Samyn
2021
8th Dwars door het Hageland
10th Scheldeprijs
2022 (1)
1st Ronde van Drenthe
1st Sprints classification, Tour de Wallonie
2nd Circuit Franco-Belge
3rd Gent–Wevelgem
3rd Druivenkoers Overijse
4th Egmont Cycling Race
5th Omloop van het Houtland
6th Kuurne–Brussels–Kuurne
6th Paris–Tours
6th Tour of Leuven
7th Le Samyn
7th Schaal Sels
7th Binche–Chimay–Binche
2023
5th Brussels Cycling Classic
5th Binche–Chimay–Binche
7th Famenne Ardenne Classic
9th Circuit de Wallonie
10th Antwerp Port Epic
2024
3rd Grand Prix de Denain
10th Bredene Koksijde Classic

=== Grand Tour general classification results timeline ===
| Grand Tour | 2023 |
|---|---|
| Giro d'Italia | — |
| Tour de France | — |
| Vuelta a España | 107 |

Legend
| — | Did not compete |
| DNF | Did not finish |
