= Jonas Rickaert =

Belgian bicycle rider

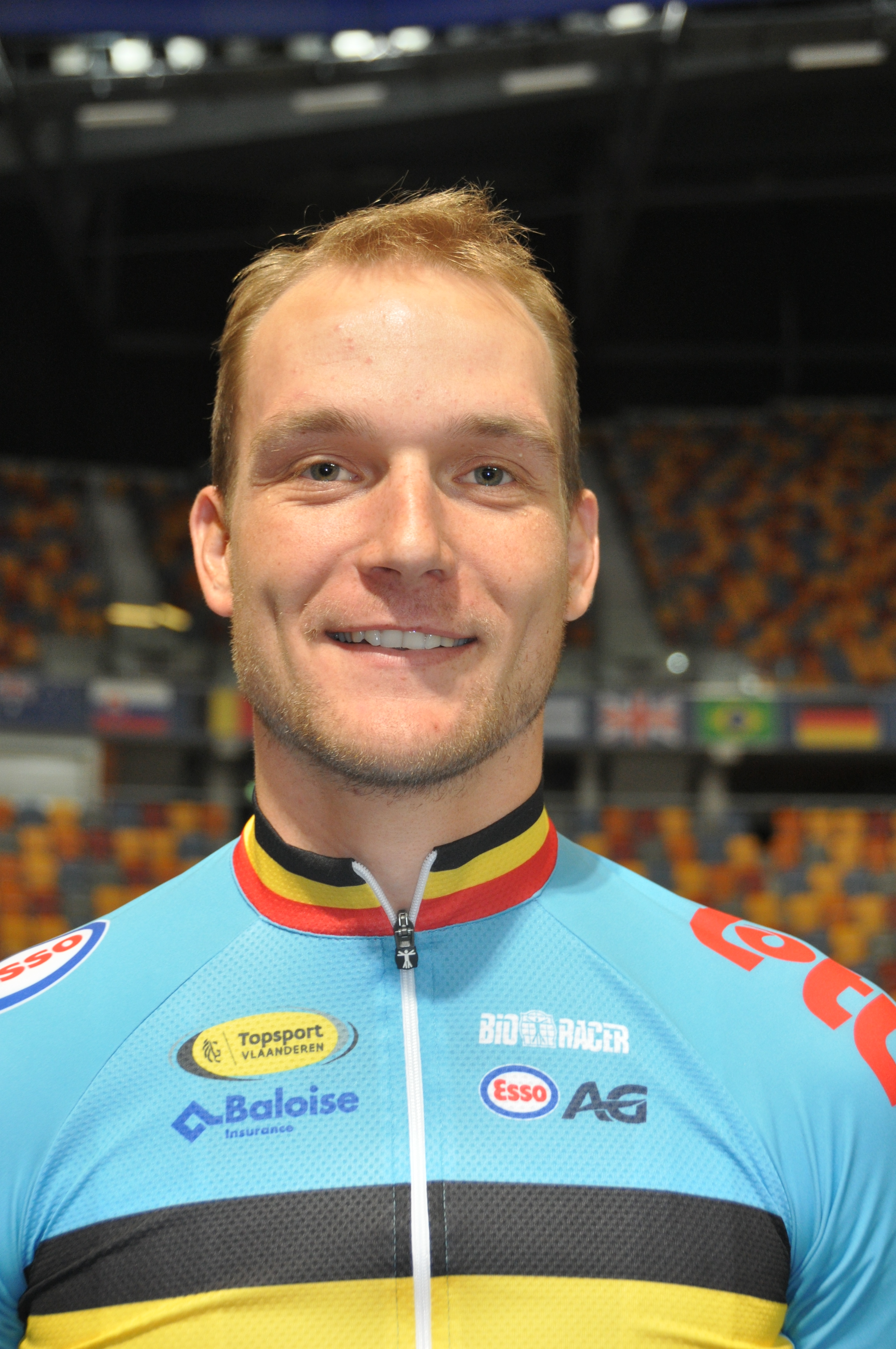
- Rickaert in 2016

Personal information
- Full name: Jonas Rickaert
- Born: 7 February 1994 (age 32) Waregem, Belgium
- Height: 1.87 m (6 ft 2 in)
- Weight: 83.5 kg (184 lb)

Cycling career
- Sport: Cycling
- Current team: Alpecin–Premier Tech
- Disciplines: Road; Track
- Role: Rider

Amateur teams
- 2011–2012: Balen BC
- 2013: Ovyta–Eijssen–Acrog
- 2014: Royal Ligue Velocipedique

Professional teams
- 2014–2018: Topsport Vlaanderen–Baloise
- 2019–: Corendon–Circus

Major wins
- One-day races and Classics Dwars door het Hageland (2020)

Jonas Rickaert (born 7 February 1994 in Waregem) is a Belgian cyclist, who currently rides for UCI WorldTeam Alpecin–Premier Tech.

Rickaert won the combativity award on Stage 9 of the 2025 Tour de France, after attacking from the start alongside team-mate Mathieu van der Poel; Rickaert was dropped with six kilometres to go and van der Poel was caught inside the final kilometre.

== Major results ==
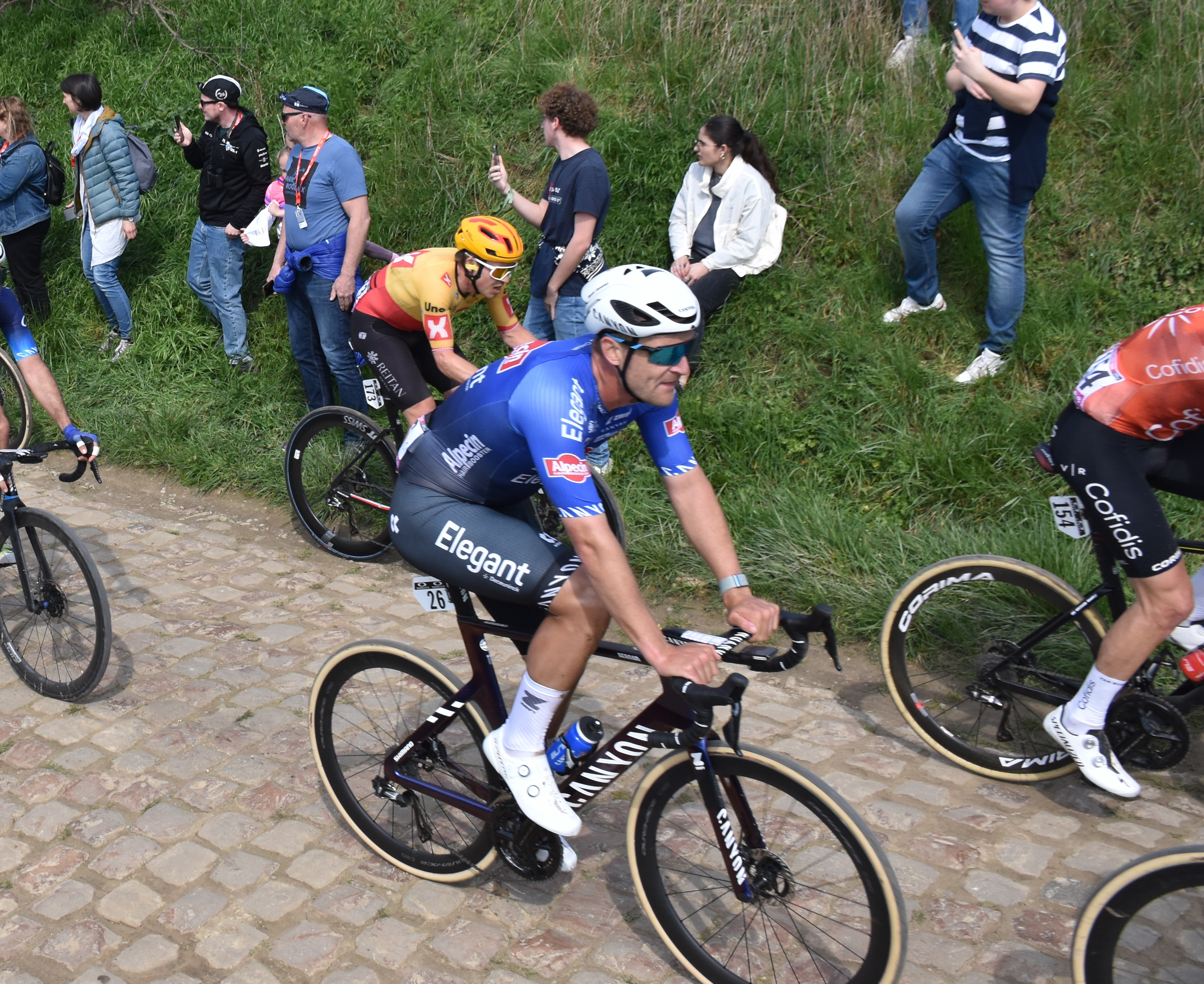
Paris-Roubaix 2023 - Secteur pavé de Quiévy à Saint-Python - N° 26 Jonas Rickaert.

2011
1st Stage 4 Coupe du Président de la Ville de Grudziadz
2012
1st Overall Coupe du Président de la Ville de Grudziadz

1st Stage 1b

2nd Overall Keizer der Juniores

1st Stage 2a (ITT)

2013
10th GP Briek Schotte
2014
3rd Overall Tour de Gironde
2017
1st Grote Prijs Marcel Kint
9th Primus Classic
2018
5th Gooikse Pijl
6th Tour de l'Eurométropole
8th Scheldeprijs
8th Tro-Bro Léon
10th Overall Danmark Rundt
10th Chrono des Nations
2020 (1 pro win)
1st Dwars door het Hageland
10th Three Days of Bruges–De Panne
2021
1st Grote Prijs Raf Jonckheere
1st Paarl Boxing Day Track Challenge
3rd Heistse Pijl
4th Dwars door het Hageland
1st 2021 Paarl Boxing Day Track Challenge
2023
1st GP Briek Schotte
1st Paarl Boxing Day Track Challenge
6th Classic Brugge–De Panne
10th Egmont Cycling Race
2025
Combativity award Stage 9 Tour de France
2026
2nd Road race, National Road Championships

=== Grand Tour general classification results timeline ===
Grand Tour	2021	2022	2023	2024	2025
Giro d'Italia	—	—	—	—	—
Tour de France	95	—	114	DNF	98
Vuelta a España	—	—	—	—	106

Legend
—	Did not compete
DNF	Did not finish
