= Dwars door het Hageland =

One day cycling race in Belgium

Race details
- Region: Flemish Brabant
- Discipline: Road
- Competition: UCI Europe Tour; UCI ProSeries
- Type: One-day race
- Web site: dwarsdoorhethageland.be

History (men)
- First edition: 2001
- Editions: 20 (as of 2025)
- First winner: Jan Claes (BEL)
- Most wins: Rasmus Tiller (NOR) (2 wins)
- Most recent: Paul Magnier (FRA)

History (women)
- First edition: 2021
- Editions: 5 (as of 2025)
- First winner: Chantal van den Broek-Blaak (NED)
- Most wins: No repeat winners
- Most recent: Lorena Wiebes (NED)

Dwars door het Hageland is a cycling race held annually in Belgium. Up until 2019, it was a part of the UCI Europe Tour as a category 1.1 event, though between 2010 and 2012, it was a category 1.2 event. In 2020, the race was promoted to the newly created UCI ProSeries as a category 1.Pro event.

In 2026, after being demoted from ProSeries, it was reported in March that the race will be absorbed into Baloise Belgium Tour as one of the stages, with alteration to its current route; however in April it was announced that the plan were vetoed by UCI and the future of the race is uncertain. It was finally included as stage 4 of the Belgium Tour after further revisions, mainly removing the iconic gravel sections of the route, and ending the stage in Aarschot which was originally the start location of the race.

In 2021 a women's race was added as a category 1.2 event, but in 2022 it was already upgraded to a category 1.1 event.

== Winners ==
=== Men's race ===
Year	Country	Rider	Team
2001	Belgium	Jan Claes	
2002	Belgium	Frank Verjans	
2003	New Zealand	Gordon McCauley	Giant Asia Racing Team
2004–2005	No race		
2006	Lithuania	Gediminas Bagdonas	Team Klaipeda
2007	Belgium	Dave Bruylandts	Klaipeda-Splendid Cyclingteam
2008	Belgium	Bert Scheirlinckx	Landbouwkrediet–Tönissteiner
2009	Belgium	Geert Omloop	Palmans-Cras
2010	Belgium	Frédéric Amorison	Landbouwkrediet
2011	Belgium	Grégory Habeaux	Veranda's Willems–Accent
2012	Belgium	Timothy Stevens	Ovyta–Eijssen–Acrog
2013–2015	No race		
2016	Netherlands	Niki Terpstra	Etixx–Quick-Step
2017	Netherlands	Mathieu van der Poel	Beobank–Corendon
2018	Latvia	Krists Neilands	Israel Cycling Academy
2019	Belgium	Kenneth Vanbilsen	Cofidis
2020	Belgium	Jonas Rickaert	Alpecin–Fenix
2021	Norway	Rasmus Tiller	Uno-X Pro Cycling Team
2022	Netherlands	Oscar Riesebeek	Alpecin–Fenix
2023	Norway	Rasmus Tiller	Uno-X Pro Cycling Team
2024	Belgium	Gianni Vermeersch	Alpecin–Deceuninck
2025	France	Paul Magnier	Soudal–Quick-Step
2026	No race		

==== Wins per country ====
Wins	Country
13	Belgium
3	Netherlands
2	Norway
1	France; Latvia; Lithuania; New Zealand

=== Women's race ===
Year	Country	Rider	Team
2021	Netherlands	Chantal van den Broek-Blaak	SD Worx
2022	Italy	Ilaria Sanguineti	Valcar–Travel & Service
2023	Belgium	Lotte Kopecky	SD Worx
2024	Netherlands	Lucinda Brand	Lidl–Trek
2025	Netherlands	Lorena Wiebes	Team SD Worx–Protime

==== Wins per country ====
Wins	Country
3	Netherlands
1	Belgium; Italy
