= Antwerp Port Epic =

Belgian annual cycling race

Race details
- Date: September
- Region: Belgium
- Discipline: Road
- Competition: UCI Europe Tour; UCI Women's ProSeries
- Type: One-day race
- Web site: www.selstrophy.be/en/

History (men)
- First edition: 2018
- Editions: 9 (as of 2026)
- First winner: Guillaume Van Keirsbulck (BEL)
- Most wins: No repeat winners
- Most recent: Per Strand Hagenes (NOR)

History (women)
- First edition: 2023
- Editions: 4 (as of 2026)
- First winner: Marthe Truyen (BEL)
- Most wins: No repeat winners
- Most recent: Femke Markus (NED)

Antwerp Port Epic is a cycling race held annually in Belgium. It was created in 2018 and is part of UCI Europe Tour in category 1.1. A women's edition has also been held since 2023, becoming part of the UCI Women's ProSeries from 2025.

== Winners ==
=== Men ===
Year	Country	Rider	Team
2018	Belgium	Guillaume Van Keirsbulck	Wanty–Groupe Gobert
2019	Belgium	Aimé De Gendt	Wanty–Gobert
2020	Belgium	Gianni Vermeersch	Alpecin–Fenix
2021	Netherlands	Mathieu van der Poel	Alpecin–Fenix
2022	Belgium	Florian Vermeersch	Lotto–Soudal
2023	Belgium	Dries De Bondt	Alpecin–Deceuninck
2024	Norway	Alexander Kristoff	Uno-X Mobility
2025	Belgium	Timo Kielich	Alpecin–Deceuninck
2026	Norway	Per Strand Hagenes	Visma–Lease a Bike

=== Women ===
Year	Country	Rider	Team
2023	Belgium	Marthe Truyen	Fenix–Deceuninck
2024	Ireland	Lara Gillespie	UAE Development Team
2025	Norway	Susanne Andersen	Uno-X Mobility
2026	Netherlands	Femke Markus	Team SD Worx–Protime
