= Van Merksteijn Fences Classic =

Cycling race

Race details
- Date: May
- Region: Zwevegem, Belgium
- Local name(s): Zwevegem Koerse
- Discipline: Road
- Competition: UCI Europe Tour
- Type: One-day race

History
- First edition: 1930
- Editions: 80 (as of 2023)
- First winner: Adolf Van Bruaene (BEL)
- Most wins: Jef Planckaert (BEL) (4 wins)
- Most recent: Caleb Ewan (AUS)

The Van Merksteijn Fences Classic, known as the Grote Prijs Marcel Kint until 2023, is a cycling race held annually in Belgium (Zwevegem & Kortrijk). It is part of UCI Europe Tour in category 1.1.

Jef Planckaert holds the record of 4 victories.

== Winners ==
Year	Country	Rider	Team
1930	Belgium	Adolf Van Bruaene	
1935	Belgium	Marcel Kint	
1936	Belgium	Michel D'Hooghe	Van Hauwaert
1937	Belgium	Albert Beirnaert	
1938	Belgium	Frans Binnemans	
1942	Belgium	Jef Vande Weghe	
1947	Belgium	Albert Paepe	
1948	Belgium	Roger Cnockaert	
1949	Belgium	Valère Ollivier	
1950	Belgium	Valère Ollivier	
1951	Belgium	Basiel Wambeke	
1952	Belgium	Willem Lebaere	
1953	Belgium	Willy Geers	
1954	Australia	Russell Mockridge	
1955	Belgium	Georges Decraeye	
1956	Belgium	Jef Planckaert	
1957	Belgium	Staf Van Vaerenbergh	
1958	Belgium	Jef Planckaert	
1959	Belgium	Gilbert Desmet	
1960	Belgium	Arthur Decabooter	
1961	Belgium	Jef Planckaert	
1962	Belgium	Jef Planckaert	
1963	Belgium	Norbert Kerckhove	
1964	Belgium	Frans Melckenbeeck	
1965	Belgium	Ward Sals	
1966	Belgium	Roland Van De Rijse	
1967	Belgium	Noël Van Clooster	
1968	No race due to not held		
1969	Belgium	André Dierickx	
1970	Belgium	Willy Van Neste	
1971	Belgium	Guido Reybrouck	
1972	Belgium	Christian Callens	
1973	Belgium	Frans Verbeeck (cyclist) Frans	
1974	Belgium	Willy Van Neste	
1975	Belgium	Roland De Witte	
1976	Belgium	José Vanackere	
1977	Belgium	Willy Planckaert	
1978	Belgium	Alain Desaever	
1979	Belgium	Lieven Malfait	
1980	Belgium	Patrick Devos	
1981	Belgium	Willy Teirlinck	
1982	Belgium	Dirk Heirweg	
1983	Belgium	Luc Meersman	
1984	Belgium	Eddy Planckaert	
1985	Belgium	Franky Van Oyen	
1986	Belgium	Roger Ilegems	
1987	Netherlands	Frank Pirard	
1988	Belgium	Franky Pattyn	
1989	Belgium	Ludo Giesberts	
1990	Belgium	Ludo Giesberts	
1991	Belgium	Marnix Lameire	
1992	Belgium	Ferdi Dierickx	
1993	Belgium	Michel Vermote	
1994	Belgium	Wim Omloop	
1995	Sweden	Anders Eklundh	
1996	Belgium	Danny Daelman	
1997	Belgium	Peter Van Petegem	TVM–Farm Frites
1998	Belgium	Bart Heirewegh	
1999	Netherlands	Adrie van der Poel	Rabobank
2000	Belgium	Eric De Clercq	Collstrop
2001	Netherlands	Jan van Velzen	Batavus–Bankgiroloterij
2002	New Zealand	Gordon McCauley	RDM-Flanders
2003	Lithuania	Aivaras Baranauskas	
2004	Belgium	Frank Vandenbroucke	Fassa Bortolo
2005	Belgium	Frank Vandenbroucke	MrBookmaker.com–SportsTech
2006	Belgium	Kevin Van der Slagmolen	
2007	Belgium	Geert Omloop	Jartazi–Promo Fashion
2008	Belgium	Niko Eeckhout	Topsport Vlaanderen
2009	Belgium	David Geldhof	
2010	No race due to not held		
2011	Belgium	Baptiste Planckaert	Landbouwkrediet
2012	Lithuania	Ramūnas Navardauskas	Chipotle–First Solar Development Team
2013	Belgium	Iljo Keisse	Omega Pharma–Quick-Step
2014	Netherlands	Brian van Goethem	Metec–TKH
2015	Belgium	Baptiste Planckaert	Roubaix–Lille Métropole
2016	Netherlands	Jan-Willem van Schip	Cyclingteam Join-S–De Rijke
2017	Belgium	Jonas Rickaert	Sport Vlaanderen–Baloise
2018	France	Nacer Bouhanni	Cofidis
2019	France	Bryan Coquard	Vital Concept–B&B Hotels
2020	No race due to COVID-19 pandemic in Belgium		
2021	Colombia	Álvaro Hodeg	Deceuninck–Quick-Step
2022	Belgium	Arnaud De Lie	Lotto–Soudal
2023	Australia	Caleb Ewan	Lotto–Dstny
