= 2014 Topsport Vlaanderen–Baloise season =

Belgian cycling team season

2014 Topsport Vlaanderen–Baloise season
Manager	Christophe Sercu
One-day victories	8
Stage race overall victories	–
Stage race stage victories	3
Previous season • Next season

The 2014 season for the Topsport Vlaanderen–Baloise cycling team began in February at the Grand Prix d'Ouverture La Marseillaise. The team participated in UCI Continental Circuits and UCI World Tour events when given a wildcard invitation.

== 2014 roster ==
As of 6 February 2014.

Rider	Date of birth
Victor Campenaerts (BEL)	28 October 1991 (age 34)
Jasper De Buyst (BEL)	24 November 1993 (age 32)
Kevin De Jonghe (BEL)	4 December 1991 (age 34)
Kenny De Ketele (BEL)	5 June 1985 (age 40)
Moreno De Pauw (BEL)	12 August 1991 (age 34)
Tim Declercq (BEL)	21 March 1989 (age 37)
Sander Helven (BEL)	30 May 1990 (age 35)
Pieter Jacobs (BEL)	6 June 1986 (age 39)
Yves Lampaert (BEL)	10 April 1991 (age 35)
Eliot Lietaer (BEL)	15 August 1990 (age 35)
Jonas Rickaert (BEL)	7 February 1994 (age 32)
Jarl Salomein (BEL)	27 January 1989 (age 37)
Thomas Sprengers (BEL)	5 February 1990 (age 36)

Rider	Date of birth
Stijn Steels (BEL)	21 August 1989 (age 36)
Edward Theuns (BEL)	30 April 1991 (age 34)
Tom Van Asbroeck (BEL)	19 April 1990 (age 36)
Preben Van Hecke (BEL)	9 July 1982 (age 43)
Gijs Van Hoecke (BEL)	12 November 1991 (age 34)
Michael Van Staeyen (BEL)	13 August 1988 (age 37)
Kenneth Vanbilsen (BEL)	1 June 1990 (age 35)
Arthur Vanoverberghe (BEL)	7 February 1990 (age 36)
Pieter Vanspeybrouck (BEL)	10 February 1987 (age 39)
Otto Vergaerde (BEL)	15 July 1994 (age 31)
Zico Waeytens (BEL)	29 September 1991 (age 34)
Jelle Wallays (BEL)	11 May 1989 (age 36)

Riders who joined the team for the 2014 season

Rider	2013 team
Victor Campenaerts	neo-pro (Lotto-Belisol U23)
Moreno De Pauw	neo-pro (Rock Werchter)
Jonas Rickaert	neo-pro (Ovyta-PWS Eijssen)
Stijn Steels	Crelan–Euphony
Edward Theuns	neo-pro (VL Technics)
Otto Vergaerde	neo-pro (Ovyta-PWS Eijssen)

Riders who left the team during or after the 2013 season

Rider	2014 team
Sander Armée	Lotto–Belisol
Dominique Cornu	Sunweb-Napoleon Games
Laurens De Vreese	Wanty–Groupe Gobert
Tim Mertens	Retired
Stijn Neirynck	Retired
Sven Vandousselaere	Vastgoedservice–Golden Palace

== Season victories ==
Date	Race	Competition	Rider	Country	Location
2 February	Grand Prix d'Ouverture La Marseillaise	UCI Europe Tour	Kenneth Vanbilsen (BEL)	France	Marseille
5 February	Étoile de Bessèges, Stage 1	UCI Europe Tour	Sander Helven (BEL)	France	Beaucaire
23 February	Vuelta a Andalucía, Mountains classification	UCI Europe Tour	Tom Van Asbroeck (BEL)	Spain	
23 March	Cholet-Pays de Loire	UCI Europe Tour	Tom Van Asbroeck (BEL)	France	Cholet
1 April	Three Days of De Panne, Sprints classification	UCI Europe Tour	Stijn Steels (BEL)	Belgium	
11 April	Circuit de la Sarthe, Mountains classification	UCI Europe Tour	Thomas Sprengers (BEL)	France	
1 June	Tour of Belgium, Combativity classification	UCI Europe Tour	Yves Lampaert (BEL)	Belgium	
7 June	Boucles de la Mayenne, Stage 2	UCI Europe Tour	Eliot Lietaer (BEL)	France	Hambers
8 June	Boucles de la Mayenne, Points classification	UCI Europe Tour	Tom Van Asbroeck (BEL)	France	
25 June	Internationale Wielertrofee Jong Maar Moedig	UCI Europe Tour	Gijs Van Hoecke (BEL)	Belgium	Oetingen
29 July	Tour de Wallonie, Stage 4	UCI Europe Tour	Tom Van Asbroeck (BEL)	Belgium	Waremme
30 July	Tour de Wallonie, Sprints classification	UCI Europe Tour	Zico Waeytens (BEL)	Belgium	
30 July	Tour de Wallonie, Teams classification	UCI Europe Tour	(Note: The riders on the squad were Tom Van Asbroeck, Thomas Sprengers, Gijs Van Hoecke, Yves Lampaert, Jelle Wallays, Pieter Jacobs and Zico Waeytens)	Belgium	
17 August	Eneco Tour, Combativity classification	UCI World Tour	Kenneth Vanbilsen (BEL)	(Note: Race held in Belgium and the Netherlands.)	
19 August	Grote Prijs Stad Zottegem	UCI Europe Tour	Edward Theuns (BEL)	Belgium	Zottegem
22 August	Arnhem–Veenendaal Classic	UCI Europe Tour	Yves Lampaert (BEL)	Netherlands	Veenendaal
13 September	De Kustpijl	UCI Europe Tour	Michael Van Staeyen (BEL)	Belgium	Knokke-Heist
24 September	Omloop van het Houtland	UCI Europe Tour	Jelle Wallays (BEL)	Belgium	Lichtervelde
12 October	Paris–Tours	UCI Europe Tour	Jelle Wallays (BEL)	France	Tours
