= 2015 Topsport Vlaanderen–Baloise season =

Topsport Vlaanderen–Baloise
- 2015 season
- UCI code: TSV
- Status: UCI Professional Continental
- Manager: Christophe Sercu
- Main sponsor(s): Topsport Vlaanderen & Baloise Insurance
- Based: Belgium
- Bicycles: Eddy Merckx

Season victories
- One-day races: 6
- Stage race overall: -
- Stage race stages: 2
- National Championships: 1

The 2015 season for the Topsport Vlaanderen–Baloise cycling team began in February at the Tour of Qatar. The team participated in UCI Continental Circuits and UCI World Tour events when given a wildcard invitation.

== 2015 roster ==
Rider	Date of birth
Victor Campenaerts (BEL)	28 October 1991 (age 33)
Amaury Capiot (BEL)	25 June 1993 (age 31)
Kenny De Ketele (BEL)	5 June 1985 (age 39)
Moreno De Pauw (BEL)	12 August 1991 (age 33)
Floris De Tier (BEL)	20 January 1992 (age 33)
Tim Declercq (BEL)	21 March 1989 (age 35)
Sander Helven (BEL)	30 May 1990 (age 34)
Pieter Jacobs (BEL)	6 June 1986 (age 38)
Eliot Lietaer (BEL)	15 August 1990 (age 34)
Oliver Naesen (BEL)	16 September 1990 (age 34)
Jonas Rickaert (BEL)	7 February 1994 (age 31)
Jarl Salomein (BEL)	27 January 1989 (age 36)

Rider	Date of birth
Thomas Sprengers (BEL)	5 February 1990 (age 35)
Stijn Steels (BEL)	21 August 1989 (age 35)
Edward Theuns (BEL)	30 April 1991 (age 33)
Preben Van Hecke (BEL)	9 July 1982 (age 42)
Gijs Van Hoecke (BEL)	12 November 1991 (age 33)
Bert Van Lerberghe (BEL)	29 September 1992 (age 32)
Jef Van Meirhaeghe (BEL)	23 January 1992 (age 33)
Arthur Vanoverberghe (BEL)	7 February 1990 (age 35)
Pieter Vanspeybrouck (BEL)	10 February 1987 (age 38)
Otto Vergaerde (BEL)	15 July 1994 (age 30)
Jelle Wallays (BEL)	11 May 1989 (age 35)
Jens Wallays (BEL)	15 September 1992 (age 32)

Riders who joined the team for the 2015 season

Rider	2014 team
Amaury Capiot	neo-pro (Lotto-Belisol U23)
Floris De Tier	neo-pro (EFC-OmegaPharma-Quick Step)
Oliver Naesen	neo-pro (Cibel)
Bert Van Lerberghe	neo-pro (EFC-OmegaPharma-Quick Step)
Jef Van Meirhaeghe	neo-pro (Lotto-Belisol U23)
Jens Wallays	neo-pro (EFC-OmegaPharma-Quick Step)

Riders who left the team during or after the 2014 season

Rider	2015 team
Jasper De Buyst	Lotto–Soudal
Kevin De Jonghe	Cibel
Yves Lampaert	Etixx–Quick-Step
Tom Van Asbroeck	LottoNL–Jumbo
Kenneth Vanbilsen	Cofidis
Michael Van Staeyen	Cofidis
Zico Waeytens	Team Giant–Alpecin

== Season victories ==
Date	Race	Competition	Rider	Country	Location
8 February	Étoile de Bessèges, Points classification	UCI Europe Tour	Edward Theuns (BEL)	France	
22 February	Tour of Oman, Combativity classification	UCI Asia Tour	Jef Van Meirhaeghe (BEL)	Oman	
14 March	Ronde van Drenthe	UCI Europe Tour	Edward Theuns (BEL)	Netherlands	Hoogeveen
25 March	Dwars door Vlaanderen	UCI Europe Tour	Jelle Wallays (BEL)	Belgium	Waregem
2 April	Three Days of De Panne, Mountains classification	UCI Europe Tour	Jarl Salomein (BEL)	Belgium	
10 May	Four Days of Dunkirk, Stage 5	UCI Europe Tour	Edward Theuns (BEL)	France	Dunkirk
17 May	Grand Prix Criquielion	UCI Europe Tour	Jelle Wallays (BEL)	Belgium	Deux-Acren
7 June	Tour de Luxembourg, Young rider classification	UCI Europe Tour	Oliver Naesen (BEL)	Luxembourg	
29 July	Tour de Wallonie, Young rider classification	UCI Europe Tour	Victor Campenaerts (BEL)	Belgium	
29 July	Tour de Wallonie, Teams classification	UCI Europe Tour	(Note: The riders on the squad were Victor Campenaerts, Oliver Naesen, Edward Theuns, Jelle Wallays, Pieter Vanspeybrouck, Thomas Sprengers and Gijs Van Hoecke)	Belgium	
2 August	Polynormande	UCI Europe Tour	Oliver Naesen (BEL)	France	Saint-Martin-de-Landelles
27 September	Gooikse Pijl	UCI Europe Tour	Oliver Naesen (BEL)	Belgium	Gooik
27 September	Duo Normand	UCI Europe Tour	Victor Campenaerts (BEL); Jelle Wallays (BEL)	France	Marigny
3 October	Tour de l'Eurométropole, Stage 3	UCI Europe Tour	Edward Theuns (BEL)	Belgium	Nieuwpoort

== National, Continental and World champions 2015 ==
Date	Discipline	Jersey	Rider	Country	Location
28 June	Belgian National Road Race Champion		Preben Van Hecke (BEL)	Belgium	Tervuren
