= 2014 Tour de Wallonie =

2014 UCI Europe Tour

Race details
- Dates: 26–30 July 2014
- Stages: 5
- Distance: 888 km (551.8 mi)
- Winning time: 22h 17' 11"

Results
Jersey awarded to the overall winner	Winner	Gianni Meersman (BEL)	(Omega Pharma–Quick-Step)
	Second	Juan José Lobato (ESP)	(Movistar Team)
	Third	Silvan Dillier (SUI)	(BMC Racing Team)
	Points	Gianni Meersman (BEL)	(Omega Pharma–Quick-Step)
Jersey awarded to the mountains classification winner	Mountains	Kevin Van Melsen (BEL)	(Wanty–Groupe Gobert)
Jersey awarded to the youth classification winner	Youth	Silvan Dillier (SUI)	(BMC Racing Team)
Jersey awarded to the sprints classification winner	Sprints	Zico Waeytens (BEL)	(Topsport Vlaanderen–Baloise)
	Combativity	Maxime Anciaux (BEL)	(Wallonie-Bruxelles)
	Team	Topsport Vlaanderen–Baloise	

The 2014 Tour de Wallonie was the 41st edition of the Tour de Wallonie cycle race and was held on 26–30 July 2014. The race started in Frasnes-lez-Anvaing and finished in Ans. The race was won by Gianni Meersman.

== Teams ==
Seventeen teams competed in the 2014 Tour de Wallonie. These included eleven UCI ProTeams, four UCI Professional Continental and two UCI Continental teams.

The teams that participated in the race were:

- Ag2r–La Mondiale
- Belkin Pro Cycling
- BMC Racing Team
- Bretagne–Séché Environnement
- Cofidis
- Color Code–Biowanze
- Team Europcar
- FDJ.fr
- Team Katusha
- Lotto–Belisol
- Movistar Team
- Omega Pharma–Quick-Step
- Tinkoff–Saxo
- Topsport Vlaanderen–Baloise
- Trek Factory Racing
- Wallonie-Bruxelles
- Wanty–Groupe Gobert

== Route ==
Stage characteristics and winners
Stage	Date	Course	Distance	Type	Winner
1	26 July	Frasnes-lez-Anvaing to Tournai	147.9 km (92 mi)	Flat stage	Jens Debusschere (BEL)
2	27 July	Péronnes-lez-Antoing to Perwez	196.2 km (122 mi)	Flat stage	Giacomo Nizzolo (ITA)
3	28 July	Somme-Leuze to Neufchâteau	180.9 km (112 mi)	Flat stage	Juan José Lobato (ESP)
4	29 July	Herve to Waremme	179.5 km (112 mi)	Hilly stage	Tom Van Asbroeck (BEL)
5	30 July	Malmedy to Ans	183.5 km (114 mi)	Hilly stage	Gianni Meersman (BEL)

== Stages ==
=== Stage 1 ===
26 July 2014 — Frasnes-lez-Anvaing to Tournai, 147.9 km (92 mi)

Stage 1 result
Rank	Rider	Team	Time
1	Jens Debusschere (BEL)	Lotto–Belisol	3h 39' 18"
2	Gianni Meersman (BEL)	Omega Pharma–Quick-Step	+ 0"
3	Juan José Lobato (ESP)	Movistar Team	+ 0"
4	Giacomo Nizzolo (ITA)	Trek Factory Racing	+ 0"
5	Marko Kump (SLO)	Tinkoff–Saxo	+ 0"
6	Yauheni Hutarovich (BLR)	Ag2r–La Mondiale	+ 0"
7	Louis Verhelst (BEL)	Cofidis	+ 0"
8	Tom Van Asbroeck (BEL)	Topsport Vlaanderen–Baloise	+ 0"
9	Theo Bos (NED)	Belkin Pro Cycling	+ 0"
10	Vyacheslav Kuznetsov (RUS)	Team Katusha	+ 0"

General classification after stage 1
Rank	Rider	Team	Time
1	Jens Debusschere (BEL)	Lotto–Belisol	3h 39' 08"
2	Zico Waeytens (BEL)	Topsport Vlaanderen–Baloise	+ 1"
3	Gianni Meersman (BEL)	Omega Pharma–Quick-Step	+ 4"
4	Juan José Lobato (ESP)	Movistar Team	+ 6"
5	Giacomo Nizzolo (ITA)	Trek Factory Racing	+ 10"
6	Marko Kump (SLO)	Tinkoff–Saxo	+ 10"
7	Yauheni Hutarovich (BLR)	Ag2r–La Mondiale	+ 10"
8	Louis Verhelst (BEL)	Cofidis	+ 10"
9	Tom Van Asbroeck (BEL)	Topsport Vlaanderen–Baloise	+ 10"
10	Theo Bos (NED)	Belkin Pro Cycling	+ 10"

=== Stage 2 ===
27 July 2014 — Péronnes-lez-Antoing to Perwez, 196.2 km (122 mi)

Stage 2 result
Rank	Rider	Team	Time
1	Giacomo Nizzolo (ITA)	Trek Factory Racing	4h 51' 35"
2	Gianni Meersman (BEL)	Omega Pharma–Quick-Step	+ 0"
3	Silvan Dillier (SUI)	BMC Racing Team	+ 0"
4	Yauheni Hutarovich (BLR)	Ag2r–La Mondiale	+ 0"
5	Jens Debusschere (BEL)	Lotto–Belisol	+ 0"
6	Marko Kump (SLO)	Tinkoff–Saxo	+ 0"
7	Christophe Laporte (FRA)	Cofidis	+ 0"
8	Tom Van Asbroeck (BEL)	Topsport Vlaanderen–Baloise	+ 0"
9	Nick van der Lijke (NED)	Belkin Pro Cycling	+ 0"
10	Antoine Demoitié (BEL)	Wallonie-Bruxelles	+ 0"

General classification after stage 2
Rank	Rider	Team	Time
1	Gianni Meersman (BEL)	Omega Pharma–Quick-Step	8h 30' 38"
2	Giacomo Nizzolo (ITA)	Trek Factory Racing	+ 5"
3	Jens Debusschere (BEL)	Lotto–Belisol	+ 5"
4	Zico Waeytens (BEL)	Topsport Vlaanderen–Baloise	+ 6"
5	Sebastian Lander (DNK)	BMC Racing Team	+ 10"
6	Silvan Dillier (SUI)	BMC Racing Team	+ 11"
7	Juan José Lobato (ESP)	Movistar Team	+ 12"
8	Pieter Jacobs (BEL)	Topsport Vlaanderen–Baloise	+ 12"
9	Matti Breschel (DNK)	Tinkoff–Saxo	+ 14"
10	Yauheni Hutarovich (BLR)	Ag2r–La Mondiale	+ 15"

=== Stage 3 ===
28 July 2014 — Somme-Leuze to Neufchâteau, 180.9 km (112 mi)

Stage 3 result
Rank	Rider	Team	Time
1	Juan José Lobato (ESP)	Movistar Team	4h 35' 20"
2	Gianni Meersman (BEL)	Omega Pharma–Quick-Step	+ 0"
3	Silvan Dillier (SUI)	BMC Racing Team	+ 0"
4	Anthony Roux (FRA)	FDJ.fr	+ 0"
5	Christophe Laporte (FRA)	Cofidis	+ 0"
6	Pim Ligthart (NED)	Lotto–Belisol	+ 0"
7	Lloyd Mondory (FRA)	Ag2r–La Mondiale	+ 0"
8	Laurent Évrard (BEL)	Wallonie-Bruxelles	+ 0"
9	Matti Breschel (DNK)	Tinkoff–Saxo	+ 0"
10	Thomas Sprengers (BEL)	Topsport Vlaanderen–Baloise	+ 0"

General classification after stage 3
Rank	Rider	Team	Time
1	Gianni Meersman (BEL)	Omega Pharma–Quick-Step	13h 05' 49"
2	Juan José Lobato (ESP)	Movistar Team	+ 11"
3	Zico Waeytens (BEL)	Topsport Vlaanderen–Baloise	+ 15"
4	Silvan Dillier (SUI)	BMC Racing Team	+ 16"
5	Christopher Juul-Jensen (DNK)	Tinkoff–Saxo	+ 19"
6	Sebastian Lander (DNK)	BMC Racing Team	+ 19"
7	Pieter Jacobs (BEL)	Topsport Vlaanderen–Baloise	+ 21"
8	Lloyd Mondory (FRA)	Ag2r–La Mondiale	+ 22"
9	Matti Breschel (DNK)	Tinkoff–Saxo	+ 23"
10	Sébastien Turgot (FRA)	Team Europcar	+ 23"

=== Stage 4 ===
29 July 2014 — Herve to Waremme, 179.5 km (112 mi)

Stage 4 result
Rank	Rider	Team	Time
1	Tom Van Asbroeck (BEL)	Topsport Vlaanderen–Baloise	4h 38' 41"
2	Gianni Meersman (BEL)	Omega Pharma–Quick-Step	+ 0"
3	Vyacheslav Kuznetsov (RUS)	Team Katusha	+ 0"
4	Silvan Dillier (SUI)	BMC Racing Team	+ 0"
5	Nick van der Lijke (NED)	Belkin Pro Cycling	+ 0"
6	Matti Breschel (DNK)	Tinkoff–Saxo	+ 0"
7	Anthony Roux (FRA)	FDJ.fr	+ 0"
8	Francisco Ventoso (ESP)	Movistar Team	+ 0"
9	Juan José Lobato (ESP)	Movistar Team	+ 0"
10	Lloyd Mondory (FRA)	Ag2r–La Mondiale	+ 0"

General classification after stage 4
Rank	Rider	Team	Time
1	Gianni Meersman (BEL)	Omega Pharma–Quick-Step	17h 44' 21"
2	Juan José Lobato (ESP)	Movistar Team	+ 20"
3	Silvan Dillier (SUI)	BMC Racing Team	+ 23"
4	Tom Van Asbroeck (BEL)	Topsport Vlaanderen–Baloise	+ 23"
5	Zico Waeytens (BEL)	Topsport Vlaanderen–Baloise	+ 24"
6	Christopher Juul-Jensen (DNK)	Tinkoff–Saxo	+ 28"
7	Vyacheslav Kuznetsov (RUS)	Team Katusha	+ 30"
8	Pieter Jacobs (BEL)	Topsport Vlaanderen–Baloise	+ 30"
9	Lloyd Mondory (FRA)	Ag2r–La Mondiale	+ 31"
10	Pim Ligthart (NED)	Lotto–Belisol	+ 31"

=== Stage 5 ===
30 July 2014 — Malmedy to Ans, 183.5 km (114 mi)

Stage 5 result
Rank	Rider	Team	Time
1	Gianni Meersman (BEL)	Omega Pharma–Quick-Step	4h 33' 00"
2	Yves Lampaert (BEL)	Topsport Vlaanderen–Baloise	+ 0"
3	Jasper Stuyven (BEL)	Trek Factory Racing	+ 0"
4	Lloyd Mondory (FRA)	Ag2r–La Mondiale	+ 0"
5	Christophe Laporte (FRA)	Cofidis	+ 0"
6	Silvan Dillier (SUI)	BMC Racing Team	+ 0"
7	Anthony Roux (FRA)	FDJ.fr	+ 0"
8	Pablo Lastras (ESP)	Movistar Team	+ 0"
9	Vyacheslav Kuznetsov (RUS)	Team Katusha	+ 0"
10	Zdeněk Štybar (CZE)	Omega Pharma–Quick-Step	+ 0"

Final general classification
Rank	Rider	Team	Time
1	Gianni Meersman (BEL)	Omega Pharma–Quick-Step	22h 17' 11"
2	Juan José Lobato (ESP)	Movistar Team	+ 30"
3	Silvan Dillier (SUI)	BMC Racing Team	+ 33"
4	Tom Van Asbroeck (BEL)	Topsport Vlaanderen–Baloise	+ 33"
5	Zico Waeytens (BEL)	Topsport Vlaanderen–Baloise	+ 34"
6	Christopher Juul-Jensen (DNK)	Tinkoff–Saxo	+ 38"
7	Vyacheslav Kuznetsov (RUS)	Team Katusha	+ 40"
8	Lloyd Mondory (FRA)	Ag2r–La Mondiale	+ 41"
9	Pim Ligthart (NED)	Lotto–Belisol	+ 41"
10	Pavel Kochetkov (RUS)	Team Katusha	+ 42"

== Classification leadership table ==
Stage	Winner	General classification	Mountains classification	Young rider classification	Sprints classification	Points classification	Combativity classification	Teams classification
1	Jens Debusschere	Jens Debusschere	Julien Stassen	Louis Verhelst	Zico Waeytens	Jens Debusschere	Thomas Wertz	Team Katusha
2	Giacomo Nizzolo	Gianni Meersman	Julien Stassen	Silvan Dillier	Zico Waeytens	Gianni Meersman	Sebastian Lander	Ag2r–La Mondiale
3	Juan José Lobato	Gianni Meersman	Christopher Juul-Jensen	Silvan Dillier	Zico Waeytens	Gianni Meersman	Sebastian Lander	Topsport Vlaanderen–Baloise
4	Tom Van Asbroeck	Gianni Meersman	Kevin Van Melsen	Tom Van Asbroeck	Zico Waeytens	Gianni Meersman	Sébastien Turgot	Topsport Vlaanderen–Baloise
5	Gianni Meersman	Gianni Meersman	Kevin Van Melsen	Silvan Dillier	Zico Waeytens	Gianni Meersman	Maxime Anciaux	Topsport Vlaanderen–Baloise
Final		Gianni Meersman	Kevin Van Melsen	Silvan Dillier	Zico Waeytens	Gianni Meersman	Maxime Anciaux	Topsport Vlaanderen–Baloise
