= 2015 Three Days of De Panne =

2015 UCI Europe Tour

Race details
- Dates: 31 March – 2 April 2015
- Stages: 4
- Distance: 531.9 km (330.5 mi)
- Winning time: 12h 19' 10"

Results
Jersey awarded to the overall winner	Winner	Alexander Kristoff (NOR)	(Team Katusha)
	Second	Stijn Devolder (BEL)	(Trek Factory Racing)
	Third	Bradley Wiggins (GBR)	(Team Sky)
Jersey awarded to the points classification winner	Points	Alexander Kristoff (NOR)	(Team Katusha)
Jersey awarded to the mountains classification winner	Mountains	Jarl Salomein (BEL)	(Topsport Vlaanderen–Baloise)
Jersey awarded to the sprints classification winner	Sprints	Michael Vingerling (NED)	(Team3M)
	Team	Lotto–Soudal	

The 2015 Three Days of De Panne (Dutch: Driedaagse De Panne–Koksijde) was the 39th edition of the Three Days of De Panne cycling stage race. It took place around De Panne in West Flanders in the week between Gent–Wevelgem and the Tour of Flanders, beginning on 31 March and ending on 2 April. The race included four stages, two of which took place on the final day. It was rated as a 2.1 event in the 2015 UCI Europe Tour. The defending champion was Guillaume Van Keirsbulck (Etixx–Quick-Step), who won the 2014 edition by seven seconds.

The 2015 edition was won by Alexander Kristoff (Team Katusha), who won the first three stages and came third in the final time trial. He also won the points classification. In second place was Stijn Devolder (Trek Factory Racing). Third was Bradley Wiggins (Team Sky), who won the individual time trial on the final day.

== Teams ==
25 teams were selected to take part in the 2015 Three Days of De Panne. 11 of these were UCI WorldTeams, 11 were UCI Professional Continental teams and the remaining 3 were Belgian UCI Continental teams.

UCI WorldTeams

- Etixx–Quick-Step
- Team Sky
- Lotto–Soudal
- Astana
- FDJ
- Lampre–Merida
- Orica–GreenEDGE
- BMC Racing Team
- Team Katusha
- Trek Factory Racing
- Movistar Team

UCI Professional Continental teams

- Team Europcar
- MTN–Qhubeka
- Cult Energy Pro Cycling
- Topsport Vlaanderen–Baloise
- Bora–Argon 18
- Wanty–Groupe Gobert
- Bardiani–CSF
- Nippo–Vini Fantini
- Southeast Pro Cycling
- Team Roompot
- Androni Giocattoli

UCI Continental teams

- Team3M
- Vastgoedservice–Golden Palace
- Wallonie-Bruxelles

== Route ==
The race included four stages: the first three of these were road stages, while the fourth was an individual time trial.

Stage	Date	Course	Distance	Type	Winner
1	31 March	De Panne to Zottegem	189.1 km (117.5 mi)	Medium-mountain stage	Alexander Kristoff (NOR)
2	1 April	Zottegem to Koksijde	217.2 km (135.0 mi)	Hilly stage	Alexander Kristoff (NOR)
3a	2 April	De Panne to De Panne	111.4 km (69.2 mi)	Flat stage	Alexander Kristoff (NOR)
3b	2 April	De Panne to Koksijde to De Panne	14.2 km (9 mi)	Individual time trial	Bradley Wiggins (GBR)
Total		531.9 km (330.5 mi)			

== Stages ==
=== Stage 1 ===
31 March 2015 — De Panne to Zottegem, 189.1 km (117.5 mi)

Stage 1 result
Rank	Rider	Team	Time
1	Alexander Kristoff (NOR)	Team Katusha	3h 59' 31"
2	Jens Debusschere (BEL)	Lotto–Soudal	+ 0"
3	Stijn Devolder (BEL)	Trek Factory Racing	+ 0"
4	Sean De Bie (BEL)	Lotto–Soudal	+ 0"
5	Lars Bak (DEN)	Lotto–Soudal	+ 0"
6	Sven Erik Bystrøm (NOR)	Team Katusha	+ 6"
7	Stefan Küng (SUI)	BMC Racing Team	+ 32"
8	Arnaud Démare (FRA)	FDJ	+ 34"
9	Sacha Modolo (ITA)	Lampre–Merida	+ 34"
10	Kristian Sbaragli (ITA)	MTN–Qhubeka	+ 34"

General classification after Stage 1
Rank	Rider	Team	Time
1	Alexander Kristoff (NOR)	Team Katusha	3h 59' 21"
2	Jens Debusschere (BEL)	Lotto–Soudal	+ 2"
3	Stijn Devolder (BEL)	Trek Factory Racing	+ 6"
4	Lars Bak (DEN)	Lotto–Soudal	+ 7"
5	Sean De Bie (BEL)	Lotto–Soudal	+ 10"
6	Sven Erik Bystrøm (NOR)	Team Katusha	+ 16"
7	Stefan Küng (SUI)	BMC Racing Team	+ 42"
8	Arnaud Démare (FRA)	FDJ	+ 44"
9	Sacha Modolo (ITA)	Lampre–Merida	+ 44"
10	Kristian Sbaragli (ITA)	MTN–Qhubeka	+ 44"

=== Stage 2 ===
1 April 2015 — Zottegem to Koksijde, 217.2 km (135.0 mi)

Stage 2 result
Rank	Rider	Team	Time
1	Alexander Kristoff (NOR)	Team Katusha	5h 33' 32"
2	Elia Viviani (ITA)	Team Sky	+ 0"
3	Shane Archbold (NZL)	Bora–Argon 18	+ 0"
4	Antoine Demoitié (BEL)	Wallonie-Bruxelles	+ 0"
5	Sacha Modolo (ITA)	Lampre–Merida	+ 0"
6	Kristian Sbaragli (ITA)	MTN–Qhubeka	+ 0"
7	Raymond Kreder (NED)	Team Roompot	+ 0"
8	Mark Renshaw (AUS)	Etixx–Quick-Step	+ 0"
9	Magnus Cort (DEN)	Orica–GreenEDGE	+ 0"
10	Rafael Andriato (BRA)	Southeast Pro Cycling	+ 0"

General classification after Stage 2
Rank	Rider	Team	Time
1	Alexander Kristoff (NOR)	Team Katusha	9h 32' 43"
2	Stijn Devolder (BEL)	Trek Factory Racing	+ 16"
3	Lars Bak (DEN)	Lotto–Soudal	+ 17"
4	Sean De Bie (BEL)	Lotto–Soudal	+ 20"
5	Sven Erik Bystrøm (NOR)	Team Katusha	+ 26"
6	Elia Viviani (ITA)	Team Sky	+ 48"
7	Gerry Druyts (BEL)	Vastgoedservice–Golden Palace	+ 50"
8	Stefan Küng (SUI)	BMC Racing Team	+ 52"
9	Sacha Modolo (ITA)	Lampre–Merida	+ 54"
10	Kristian Sbaragli (ITA)	MTN–Qhubeka	+ 54"

=== Stage 3a ===
2 April 2015 — De Panne to De Panne, 114.4 km (71.1 mi)

Stage 3a result
Rank	Rider	Team	Time
1	Alexander Kristoff (NOR)	Team Katusha	2h 28' 26"
2	André Greipel (GER)	Lotto–Soudal	+ 0"
3	Sacha Modolo (ITA)	Lampre–Merida	+ 0"
4	Andrea Guardini (ITA)	Astana	+ 0"
5	Jakub Mareczko (ITA)	Southeast Pro Cycling	+ 0"
6	Raymond Kreder (NED)	Team Roompot	+ 0"
7	Dylan Groenewegen (NED)	Team Roompot	+ 0"
8	Marc Sarreau (FRA)	FDJ	+ 0"
9	Enrique Sanz (ESP)	Movistar Team	+ 0"
10	Antoine Demoitié (BEL)	Wallonie-Bruxelles	+ 0"

General classification after Stage 3a
Rank	Rider	Team	Time
1	Alexander Kristoff (NOR)	Team Katusha	12h 01' 03"
2	Stijn Devolder (BEL)	Trek Factory Racing	+ 22"
3	Lars Bak (DEN)	Lotto–Soudal	+ 23"
4	Sean De Bie (BEL)	Lotto–Soudal	+ 26"
5	Sven Erik Bystrøm (NOR)	Team Katusha	+ 32"
6	Elia Viviani (ITA)	Team Sky	+ 54"
7	André Greipel (GER)	Lotto–Soudal	+ 56"
8	Gerry Druyts (BEL)	Vastgoedservice–Golden Palace	+ 56"
9	Sacha Modolo (ITA)	Lampre–Merida	+ 58"
10	Stefan Küng (SUI)	BMC Racing Team	+ 58"

=== Stage 3b ===
2 April 2015 — De Panne to Koksijde to De Panne, 14.2 km (8.8 mi), individual time trial (ITT)

Stage 3b result
Rank	Rider	Team	Time
1	Bradley Wiggins (GBR)	Team Sky	17' 49"
2	Stefan Küng (SUI)	BMC Racing Team	+ 10"
3	Alexander Kristoff (NOR)	Team Katusha	+ 18"
4	Guillaume Van Keirsbulck (BEL)	Etixx–Quick-Step	+ 18"
5	Stijn Devolder (BEL)	Trek Factory Racing	+ 19"
6	Jesse Sergent (NZL)	Trek Factory Racing	+ 28"
7	Luke Durbridge (AUS)	Orica–GreenEDGE	+ 31"
8	Julien Vermote (BEL)	Etixx–Quick-Step	+ 34"
9	Yves Lampaert (BEL)	Etixx–Quick-Step	+ 35"
10	Jens Mouris (NED)	Orica–GreenEDGE	+ 41"

Final general classification
Rank	Rider	Team	Time
1	Alexander Kristoff (NOR)	Team Katusha	12h 19' 10"
2	Stijn Devolder (BEL)	Trek Factory Racing	+ 23"
3	Bradley Wiggins (GBR)	Team Sky	+ 42"
4	Stefan Küng (SUI)	BMC Racing Team	+ 50"
5	Sean De Bie (BEL)	Lotto–Soudal	+ 58"
6	Lars Bak (DEN)	Lotto–Soudal	+ 59"
7	Luke Durbridge (AUS)	Orica–GreenEDGE	+ 1' 13"
8	Julien Vermote (BEL)	Etixx–Quick-Step	+ 1' 16"
9	Yves Lampaert (BEL)	Etixx–Quick-Step	+ 1' 17"
10	André Greipel (GER)	Lotto–Soudal	+ 1' 20"

== Classification leadership table ==
Stage	Winner	General classification	Points classification	Mountains classification	Sprints classification	Team classification	Combativity award
1	Alexander Kristoff	Alexander Kristoff	Alexander Kristoff	Jarl Salomein	Lars Bak	Lotto–Soudal	Jens Debusschere
2	Alexander Kristoff	Alexander Kristoff	Alexander Kristoff	Jarl Salomein	Michael Vingerling	Lotto–Soudal	Gerry Druyts
3a	Alexander Kristoff	Alexander Kristoff	Alexander Kristoff	Jarl Salomein	Michael Vingerling	Lotto–Soudal	Kevin Van Melsen
3b	Bradley Wiggins	Alexander Kristoff	Alexander Kristoff	Jarl Salomein	Michael Vingerling	Lotto–Soudal	Not awarded
Final		Alexander Kristoff	Alexander Kristoff	Jarl Salomein	Michael Vingerling	Lotto–Soudal	Not awarded
