= Grand Prix de Waregem =

Grand Prix Waregem
Race details
- Date: March
- Region: Belgium
- Discipline: Road
- Competition: UCI Europe Tour
- Type: One-day race

History
- First edition: 1980
- Editions: 32
- Final edition: 2011
- First winner: Noël Segers (BEL)
- Most wins: Stijn Devolder (BEL) (2 wins)
- Final winner: Daniel McLay (GBR)

The Grand Prix Waregem was a cycling race held annually in Belgium. It was part of UCI Europe Tour in category 1.2U from 2005 to 2007. The race was considered to be the Under 23 version of Dwars door Vlaanderen.

== Winners ==
Year	Winner	Second	Third
1980	(Belgium) Noël Segers	(Belgium) Eddy Planckaert	(Belgium) Luc Colijn
1981	(Belgium) Dirk Demol	(Belgium) Geert Dhondt	(Belgium) Jean-Pierre Valepijn
1982	(Belgium) Etienne De Wilde	(Belgium) Alain Lippens	(Belgium) Robert Hendrickx
1983	(Belgium) Johan Delathouwer	(Belgium) Rudy Roels	(Belgium) Danny Lippens
1984	(Netherlands) Nico Verhoeven	(Belgium) Gino Lauwereys	(Netherlands) Cornelis Heeren
1985	(Belgium) Yves Verlinden	(Belgium) Marc Assez	(Netherlands) Jos van de Horst
1986	(Belgium) Patrick Verplancke	(Belgium) Paul Beirnaert	(Belgium) Wilfried Peeters
1987	(Netherlands) Stephan Räkers	(Netherlands) Patrick Tolhoek	(Belgium) Frank Francken
1988	(West Germany) Marcel Wüst	(Belgium) Jan Vervecken	(Netherlands) Pierre van Est
1989	(East Germany) Mario Kummer	(East Germany) Olaf Ludwig	(East Germany) Uwe Raab
1990	(Netherlands) Martin Van Steen	(Netherlands) Raymond Meijs	(Netherlands) Dennis Overgaag
1991	(Netherlands) John den Braber	(Belgium) Frank Francken	(Denmark) Jan Erik Østergaard
1992	(Netherlands) Léon van Bon	(Belgium) Erwin Thijs	(Belgium) Eddy Vancraeynest
1993	(Belgium) Yoeri Wandels	(Belgium) Wim Vansevenant	(Japan) Ken Hashikawa
1994	(Netherlands) Marcel Vegt	(Norway) Lars Kristian Johnsen	(Belgium) Eddy Vancraeynest
1995	(Netherlands) Steven de Jongh	(Netherlands) Pascal Appeldoorn	(Netherlands) Gerard Kemper
1996	(Netherlands) Peter van der Velden	(Belgium) Christoph Roodhooft	(Belgium) Goswin Laplasse
1997	(Netherlands) Johan Bruinsma	(Netherlands) Daniël van Elven	(Netherlands) Angelo van Melis
1998	(France) Nicolas L'Hôte	(Netherlands) Stefan van Dijk	(Belgium) Geoffrey Demeyere
1999	(Belgium) Cedric Flasse	(Belgium) Tom Serlet	(Germany) Torsten Nitsche
2000	(Belgium) Stijn Devolder	(Belgium) Roy Sentjens	(Germany) Rene Weissinger
2001	(Belgium) Stijn Devolder	(Belgium) Roy Sentjens	(Belgium) Tom Boonen
2002	(Netherlands) Hans Dekkers	(Germany) Eric Baumann	(Italy) Giairo Ermeti
2003	(Germany) André Greipel	(Italy) Maurizio Biondo	(Germany) Moritz Veit
2004	(Belgium) Wouter Weylandt	(France) Sebastien Minard	(Belgium) Benjamin Vanherzeele
2005	(France) Romain Fondard	(United States) Tyler Farrar	(France) Alexandre Pichot
2006	(Belgium) Jelle Vanendert	(France) Renaud Pioline	(Netherlands) Huub Duyn
2007	(Italy) Enrico Montanari	(Switzerland) Danilo Wyss	(Netherlands) Coen Vermeltfoort
2008	(Belgium) Thomas De Gendt	(Belgium) Jan Bakelants	(Lithuania) Marius Bernatonis
2009	(United States) Cole House	(Belgium) Jens Debusschere	(Belgium) Jens Keukeleire
2010	(Belgium) Thomas Chamon	(Belgium) Arthur Vanoverberghe	(Belgium) Zico Waeytens
2011	(United Kingdom) Daniel McLay	(Belgium) Sean De Bie	(Belgium) Tom Van Asbroeck
