= 2021 Vuelta a Andalucía =

2021 UCI Europe Tour 2021 UCI ProSeries

Race details
- Dates: 18–22 May 2021 (Note: The race was originally scheduled for 17 to 21 February, but due to the COVID-19 pandemic, it had to be postponed and rescheduled.)
- Stages: 5
- Distance: 807.6 km (501.8 mi)
- Winning time: 21h 06' 55"

Results
Jersey awarded to the overall winner	Winner	Miguel Ángel López (COL)	(Movistar Team)
	Second	Antwan Tolhoek (NED)	(Team Jumbo–Visma)
	Third	Julen Amezqueta (ESP)	(Caja Rural–Seguros RGA)
Jersey awarded to the points classification winner	Points	Ethan Hayter (GBR)	(Ineos Grenadiers)
Jersey awarded to the mountains classification winner	Mountains	Luis Ángel Maté (ESP)	(Euskaltel–Euskadi)
Jersey awarded to the sprints classification winner	Sprints	Thomas Sprengers (BEL)	(Sport Vlaanderen–Baloise)
	Team	Movistar Team	

The 2021 Vuelta a Andalucía Ruta del Sol was a road cycling stage race that took place in the Andalusia region of southern Spain between 18 and 22 May 2021. It was the 67th edition of the Vuelta a Andalucía, and was rated as a category-2.Pro event on the 2021 UCI Europe Tour and the 2021 UCI ProSeries calendars.

The race was originally scheduled for 17 to 21 February, but due to the COVID-19 pandemic, it had to be postponed to mid-May.

== Teams ==
Nine UCI WorldTeams and seven UCI ProTeams made up the sixteen teams that participated in the race. UAE Team Emirates, with six riders, was the only team to not enter the maximum of seven riders. 111 riders started the race, of which 104 finished.

UCI WorldTeams

- Astana–Premier Tech
- Deceuninck–Quick-Step
- Ineos Grenadiers
- Israel Start-Up Nation
- Movistar Team
- Team BikeExchange
- Team Jumbo–Visma
- Trek–Segafredo
- UAE Team Emirates

UCI ProTeams

- Alpecin–Fenix
- Burgos BH
- Caja Rural–Seguros RGA
- Equipo Kern Pharma
- Euskaltel–Euskadi
- Gazprom–RusVelo
- Sport Vlaanderen–Baloise

== Route ==
Stage characteristics and winners
Stage	Date	Course	Distance	Type	Stage winner
1	18 May	La Cala de Mijas to Zahara de la Sierra	152.1 km (94.5 mi)	Hilly stage	Gonzalo Serrano (ESP)
2	19 May	Iznájar to Alcalá la Real	183 km (114 mi)	Intermediate stage	Ethan Hayter (GBR)
3	20 May	Beas de Segura to Villarrodrigo	175.1 km (108.8 mi)	Mountain stage	Miguel Ángel López (COL)
4	21 May	Baza to Cúllar Vega	182.9 km (113.6 mi)	Flat stage	André Greipel (GER)
5	22 May	Vera to Pulpí	114.5 km (71.1 mi)	Hilly stage	Ethan Hayter (GBR)
Total			807.6 km (501.8 mi)		

== Stages ==
=== Stage 1 ===
18 May 2021 – La Cala de Mijas to Zahara de la Sierra, 152.1 km (94.5 mi)

Stage 1 Result
Rank	Rider	Team	Time
1	Gonzalo Serrano (ESP)	Movistar Team	3h 54' 25"
2	Orluis Aular (VEN)	Caja Rural–Seguros RGA	+ 0"
3	Daryl Impey (RSA)	Israel Start-Up Nation	+ 0"
4	Ethan Hayter (GBR)	Ineos Grenadiers	+ 0"
5	Robert Stannard (AUS)	Team BikeExchange	+ 3"
6	Marco Canola (ITA)	Gazprom–RusVelo	+ 3"
7	Jefferson Alveiro Cepeda (ECU)	Caja Rural–Seguros RGA	+ 3"
8	Toms Skujiņš (LAT)	Trek–Segafredo	+ 3"
9	Miguel Ángel López (COL)	Movistar Team	+ 3"
10	Antwan Tolhoek (NED)	Team Jumbo–Visma	+ 3"

General classification after Stage 1
Rank	Rider	Team	Time
1	Gonzalo Serrano (ESP)	Movistar Team	3h 54' 25"
2	Orluis Aular (VEN)	Caja Rural–Seguros RGA	+ 0"
3	Daryl Impey (RSA)	Israel Start-Up Nation	+ 0"
4	Ethan Hayter (GBR)	Ineos Grenadiers	+ 0"
5	Robert Stannard (AUS)	Team BikeExchange	+ 3"
6	Marco Canola (ITA)	Gazprom–RusVelo	+ 3"
7	Jefferson Alveiro Cepeda (ECU)	Caja Rural–Seguros RGA	+ 3"
8	Toms Skujiņš (LAT)	Trek–Segafredo	+ 3"
9	Miguel Ángel López (COL)	Movistar Team	+ 3"
10	Antwan Tolhoek (NED)	Team Jumbo–Visma	+ 3"

=== Stage 2 ===
19 May 2021 – Iznájar to Alcalá la Real, 183 km (114 mi)

Stage 2 Result
Rank	Rider	Team	Time
1	Ethan Hayter (GBR)	Ineos Grenadiers	5h 04' 30"
2	Miguel Ángel López (COL)	Movistar Team	+ 7"
3	Sven Erik Bystrøm (NOR)	UAE Team Emirates	+ 10"
4	Carlos Rodríguez (ESP)	Ineos Grenadiers	+ 14"
5	Julen Amezqueta (ESP)	Caja Rural–Seguros RGA	+ 14"
6	Jonathan Lastra (ESP)	Caja Rural–Seguros RGA	+ 17"
7	Robert Stannard (AUS)	Team BikeExchange	+ 18"
8	Óscar Rodríguez (ESP)	Astana–Premier Tech	+ 23"
9	Toms Skujiņš (LAT)	Trek–Segafredo	+ 25"
10	Roger Adrià (ESP)	Equipo Kern Pharma	+ 25"

General classification after Stage 2
Rank	Rider	Team	Time
1	Ethan Hayter (GBR)	Ineos Grenadiers	8h 58' 55"
2	Miguel Ángel López (COL)	Movistar Team	+ 10"
3	Sven Erik Bystrøm (NOR)	UAE Team Emirates	+ 13"
4	Jonathan Lastra (ESP)	Caja Rural–Seguros RGA	+ 20"
5	Robert Stannard (AUS)	Team BikeExchange	+ 21"
6	Carlos Rodríguez (ESP)	Ineos Grenadiers	+ 21"
7	Gonzalo Serrano (ESP)	Movistar Team	+ 25"
8	Toms Skujiņš (LAT)	Trek–Segafredo	+ 28"
9	Antwan Tolhoek (NED)	Team Jumbo–Visma	+ 28"
10	Daryl Impey (RSA)	Israel Start-Up Nation	+ 31"

=== Stage 3 ===
20 May 2021 – Beas de Segura to Villarrodrigo, 175.1 km (108.8 mi)

Stage 3 Result
Rank	Rider	Team	Time
1	Miguel Ángel López (COL)	Movistar Team	5h 03' 26"
2	Antwan Tolhoek (NED)	Team Jumbo–Visma	+ 2"
3	James Piccoli (CAN)	Israel Start-Up Nation	+ 6"
4	Julen Amezqueta (ESP)	Caja Rural–Seguros RGA	+ 17"
5	Mikel Bizkarra (ESP)	Euskaltel–Euskadi	+ 28"
6	Héctor Carretero (ESP)	Movistar Team	+ 1' 25"
7	Carlos Rodríguez (ESP)	Ineos Grenadiers	+ 1' 29"
8	Toms Skujiņš (LAT)	Trek–Segafredo	+ 1' 29"
9	Jonathan Lastra (ESP)	Caja Rural–Seguros RGA	+ 1' 41"
10	Óscar Rodríguez (ESP)	Astana–Premier Tech	+ 2' 07"

General classification after Stage 3
Rank	Rider	Team	Time
1	Miguel Ángel López (COL)	Movistar Team	14h 02' 31"
2	Antwan Tolhoek (NED)	Team Jumbo–Visma	+ 20"
3	Julen Amezqueta (ESP)	Caja Rural–Seguros RGA	+ 55"
4	Carlos Rodríguez (ESP)	Ineos Grenadiers	+ 1' 40"
5	Toms Skujiņš (LAT)	Trek–Segafredo	+ 1' 47"
6	James Piccoli (CAN)	Israel Start-Up Nation	+ 1' 50"
7	Jonathan Lastra (ESP)	Caja Rural–Seguros RGA	+ 1' 51"
8	Mikel Bizkarra (ESP)	Euskaltel–Euskadi	+ 1' 52"
9	Ethan Hayter (GBR)	Ineos Grenadiers	+ 2' 13"
10	Óscar Rodríguez (ESP)	Astana–Premier Tech	+ 2' 40"

=== Stage 4 ===
21 May 2021 – Baza to Cúllar Vega, 182.9 km (113.6 mi)

Stage 4 Result
Rank	Rider	Team	Time
1	André Greipel (GER)	Israel Start-Up Nation	4h 37' 12"
2	Álvaro José Hodeg (COL)	Deceuninck–Quick-Step	+ 0"
3	Mads Pedersen (DEN)	Trek–Segafredo	+ 0"
4	Alexander Kristoff (NOR)	UAE Team Emirates	+ 0"
5	Alex Kirsch (LUX)	Trek–Segafredo	+ 0"
6	Rick Zabel (GER)	Israel Start-Up Nation	+ 0"
7	Enrique Sanz (ESP)	Equipo Kern Pharma	+ 0"
8	Ethan Hayter (GBR)	Ineos Grenadiers	+ 0"
9	Alexander Konychev (ITA)	Team BikeExchange	+ 0"
10	Tobias Bayer (AUT)	Alpecin–Fenix	+ 0"

General classification after Stage 4
Rank	Rider	Team	Time
1	Miguel Ángel López (COL)	Movistar Team	18h 39' 43"
2	Antwan Tolhoek (NED)	Team Jumbo–Visma	+ 20"
3	Julen Amezqueta (ESP)	Caja Rural–Seguros RGA	+ 55"
4	Carlos Rodríguez (ESP)	Ineos Grenadiers	+ 1' 40"
5	Toms Skujiņš (LAT)	Trek–Segafredo	+ 1' 47"
6	Jonathan Lastra (ESP)	Caja Rural–Seguros RGA	+ 1' 51"
7	James Piccoli (CAN)	Israel Start-Up Nation	+ 1' 58"
8	Ethan Hayter (GBR)	Ineos Grenadiers	+ 2' 13"
9	Mikel Bizkarra (ESP)	Euskaltel–Euskadi	+ 2' 20"
10	Óscar Rodríguez (ESP)	Astana–Premier Tech	+ 2' 48"

=== Stage 5 ===
22 May 2021 – Vera to Pulpí, 114.5 km (71.1 mi)

Stage 5 Result
Rank	Rider	Team	Time
1	Ethan Hayter (GBR)	Ineos Grenadiers	2h 27' 12"
2	Philipp Walsleben (GER)	Alpecin–Fenix	+ 0"
3	Toms Skujiņš (LAT)	Trek–Segafredo	+ 0"
4	Miguel Ángel López (COL)	Movistar Team	+ 0"
5	Sven Erik Bystrøm (NOR)	UAE Team Emirates	+ 0"
6	Gonzalo Serrano (ESP)	Movistar Team	+ 0"
7	Óscar Rodríguez (ESP)	Astana–Premier Tech	+ 0"
8	Antwan Tolhoek (NED)	Team Jumbo–Visma	+ 0"
9	Tsgabu Grmay (ETH)	Team BikeExchange	+ 0"
10	Carlos Rodríguez (ESP)	Ineos Grenadiers	+ 3"

General classification after Stage 5
Rank	Rider	Team	Time
1	Miguel Ángel López (COL)	Movistar Team	21h 06' 55"
2	Antwan Tolhoek (NED)	Team Jumbo–Visma	+ 20"
3	Julen Amezqueta (ESP)	Caja Rural–Seguros RGA	+ 1' 10"
4	Carlos Rodríguez (ESP)	Ineos Grenadiers	+ 1' 43"
5	Toms Skujiņš (LAT)	Trek–Segafredo	+ 1' 47"
6	Jonathan Lastra (ESP)	Caja Rural–Seguros RGA	+ 2' 06"
7	Ethan Hayter (GBR)	Ineos Grenadiers	+ 2' 13"
8	James Piccoli (CAN)	Israel Start-Up Nation	+ 2' 24"
9	Mikel Bizkarra (ESP)	Euskaltel–Euskadi	+ 2' 44"
10	Óscar Rodríguez (ESP)	Astana–Premier Tech	+ 2' 48"

== Classification leadership table ==
Classification leadership by stage
Stage	Winner	General classification	Points classification	Mountains classification	Sprints classification	Andalusian rider classification	Spanish rider classification	Combination classification	Team classification
1	Gonzalo Serrano	Gonzalo Serrano	Gonzalo Serrano	Rui Oliveira	Thomas Sprengers	Luis Ángel Maté	Gonzalo Serrano	Gonzalo Serrano	Caja Rural–Seguros RGA
2	Ethan Hayter	Ethan Hayter	Ethan Hayter	Rui Oliveira	Aaron Van Poucke	Carlos Rodríguez	Jonathan Lastra	Ethan Hayter	Caja Rural–Seguros RGA
3	Miguel Ángel López	Miguel Ángel López	Miguel Ángel López	Luis Ángel Maté	Thomas Sprengers	Carlos Rodríguez	Julen Amezqueta	Miguel Ángel López	Caja Rural–Seguros RGA
4	André Greipel	Miguel Ángel López	Miguel Ángel López	Luis Ángel Maté	Thomas Sprengers	Carlos Rodríguez	Julen Amezqueta	Miguel Ángel López	Caja Rural–Seguros RGA
5	Ethan Hayter	Miguel Ángel López	Ethan Hayter	Luis Ángel Maté	Thomas Sprengers	Carlos Rodríguez	Julen Amezqueta	Miguel Ángel López	Movistar Team
Final		Miguel Ángel López	Ethan Hayter	Luis Ángel Maté	Thomas Sprengers	Carlos Rodríguez	Julen Amezqueta	Miguel Ángel López	Movistar Team

- On stage 2, Orluis Aular, who was second in the points classification, wore the green jersey, because first placed Gonzalo Serrano wore the yellow jersey as the leader of the general classification.
- On stage 3, Gonzalo Serrano, who was second in the points classification, wore the green jersey, because first placed Ethan Hayter wore the yellow jersey as the leader of the general classification.
- On stages 4 and 5, Ethan Hayter, who was second in the points classification, wore the green jersey, because first placed Miguel Ángel López wore the yellow jersey as the leader of the general classification.

== Final classification standings ==
Legend
Denotes the winner of the general classification	Denotes the winner of the sprints classification
Denotes the winner of the points classification	Denotes the winner of the Andalusian rider classification
Denotes the winner of the mountains classification	Denotes the winner of the Spanish rider classification

=== General classification ===
Final general classification (1–10)
Rank	Rider	Team	Time
1	Miguel Ángel López (COL)	Movistar Team	21h 06' 55"
2	Antwan Tolhoek (NED)	Team Jumbo–Visma	+ 20"
3	Julen Amezqueta (ESP)	Caja Rural–Seguros RGA	+ 1' 10"
4	Carlos Rodríguez (ESP)	Ineos Grenadiers	+ 1' 43"
5	Toms Skujiņš (LAT)	Trek–Segafredo	+ 1' 47"
6	Jonathan Lastra (ESP)	Caja Rural–Seguros RGA	+ 2' 06"
7	Ethan Hayter (GBR)	Ineos Grenadiers	+ 2' 13"
8	James Piccoli (CAN)	Israel Start-Up Nation	+ 2' 24"
9	Mikel Bizkarra (ESP)	Euskaltel–Euskadi	+ 2' 44"
10	Óscar Rodríguez (ESP)	Astana–Premier Tech	+ 2' 48"

=== Points classification ===
Final points classification (1–10)
Rank	Rider	Team	Points
1	Ethan Hayter (GBR)	Ineos Grenadiers	76
2	Miguel Ángel López (COL)	Movistar Team	66
3	Gonzalo Serrano (ESP)	Movistar Team	40
4	Toms Skujiņš (LAT)	Trek–Segafredo	39
5	Antwan Tolhoek (NED)	Team Jumbo–Visma	38
6	Sven Erik Bystrøm (NOR)	UAE Team Emirates	33
7	Carlos Rodríguez (ESP)	Ineos Grenadiers	29
8	Julen Amezqueta (ESP)	Caja Rural–Seguros RGA	26
9	André Greipel (GER)	Israel Start-Up Nation	25
10	Óscar Rodríguez (ESP)	Astana–Premier Tech	23

=== Mountains classification ===
Final mountains classification (1–10)
Rank	Rider	Team	Points
1	Luis Ángel Maté (ESP)	Euskaltel–Euskadi	33
2	Rui Oliveira (POR)	UAE Team Emirates	27
3	Thomas Sprengers (BEL)	Sport Vlaanderen–Baloise	15
4	Héctor Carretero (ESP)	Movistar Team	12
5	Álvaro Cuadros (ESP)	Caja Rural–Seguros RGA	11
6	Miguel Ángel López (COL)	Movistar Team	10
7	Urko Berrade (ESP)	Equipo Kern Pharma	8
8	Nikita Stalnov (KAZ)	Astana–Premier Tech	8
9	Antonio Jesús Soto (ESP)	Euskaltel–Euskadi	8
10	Julen Amezqueta (ESP)	Caja Rural–Seguros RGA	7

=== Sprints classification ===
Final sprints classification (1–10)
Rank	Rider	Team	Points
1	Thomas Sprengers (BEL)	Sport Vlaanderen–Baloise	9
2	Julian Mertens (BEL)	Sport Vlaanderen–Baloise	6
3	Aaron Van Poucke (BEL)	Sport Vlaanderen–Baloise	6
4	Ander Okamika (ESP)	Burgos BH	4
5	Luis Ángel Maté (ESP)	Euskaltel–Euskadi	4
6	Antonio Jesús Soto (ESP)	Euskaltel–Euskadi	3
7	Timo Roosen (NED)	Team Jumbo–Visma	2
8	Unai Cuadrado (ESP)	Euskaltel–Euskadi	2
9	Robbe Ghys (BEL)	Sport Vlaanderen–Baloise	2
10	Mikel Bizkarra (ESP)	Euskaltel–Euskadi	1

=== Andalusian rider classification ===
Final Andalusian rider classification (1–4)
Rank	Rider	Team	Time
1	Carlos Rodríguez (ESP)	Ineos Grenadiers	21h 08' 38"
2	Luis Ángel Maté (ESP)	Euskaltel–Euskadi	+ 12' 30"
3	Álvaro Cuadros (ESP)	Caja Rural–Seguros RGA	+ 26' 05"
4	Juan José Lobato (ESP)	Euskaltel–Euskadi	+ 47' 23"

=== Spanish rider classification ===
Final Spanish rider classification (1–10)
Rank	Rider	Team	Time
1	Julen Amezqueta (ESP)	Caja Rural–Seguros RGA	21h 08' 05"
2	Carlos Rodríguez (ESP)	Ineos Grenadiers	+ 33"
3	Jonathan Lastra (ESP)	Caja Rural–Seguros RGA	+ 56"
4	Mikel Bizkarra (ESP)	Euskaltel–Euskadi	+ 1' 34"
5	Óscar Rodríguez (ESP)	Astana–Premier Tech	+ 1' 38"
6	Gonzalo Serrano (ESP)	Movistar Team	+ 2' 40"
7	José Joaquín Rojas (ESP)	Movistar Team	+ 3' 59"
8	Roger Adrià (ESP)	Equipo Kern Pharma	+ 4' 07"
9	Ángel Madrazo (ESP)	Burgos BH	+ 4' 48"
10	Gotzon Martín (ESP)	Euskaltel–Euskadi	+ 9' 39"

=== Combination classification ===
Final combination classification (1–10)
Rank	Rider	Team	Points
1	Miguel Ángel López (COL)	Movistar Team	9
2	Julen Amezqueta (ESP)	Caja Rural–Seguros RGA	21
3	Toms Skujiņš (LAT)	Trek–Segafredo	21
4	Ethan Hayter (GBR)	Ineos Grenadiers	26
5	Antwan Tolhoek (NED)	Team Jumbo–Visma	29
6	Gonzalo Serrano (ESP)	Movistar Team	37
7	Mikel Bizkarra (ESP)	Euskaltel–Euskadi	38
8	James Piccoli (CAN)	Israel Start-Up Nation	44
9	Robert Stannard (AUS)	Team BikeExchange	46
10	Sven Erik Bystrøm (NOR)	UAE Team Emirates	50

=== Team classification ===
Final team classification (1–10)
Rank	Team	Time
1	Movistar Team	63h 26' 58"
2	Caja Rural–Seguros RGA	+ 23"
3	Trek–Segafredo	+ 6' 22"
4	Team BikeExchange	+ 6' 43"
5	Ineos Grenadiers	+ 7' 31"
6	Team Jumbo–Visma	+ 8' 44"
7	Astana–Premier Tech	+ 9' 51"
8	Euskaltel–Euskadi	+ 13' 34"
9	Burgos BH	+ 16' 28"
10	Israel Start-Up Nation	+ 17' 33"
