= Sercu =

Sercu is a surname. Notable people with the surname include:

- Albert Sercu (1918–1978), Belgian cyclist
- Christophe Sercu (born 1970), Belgian cycling manager
- Patrick Sercu (1944–2019), Belgian cyclist

== See also ==
- Sercus, a commune in Nord, France
