= Antwan Tolhoek =

Dutch cyclist

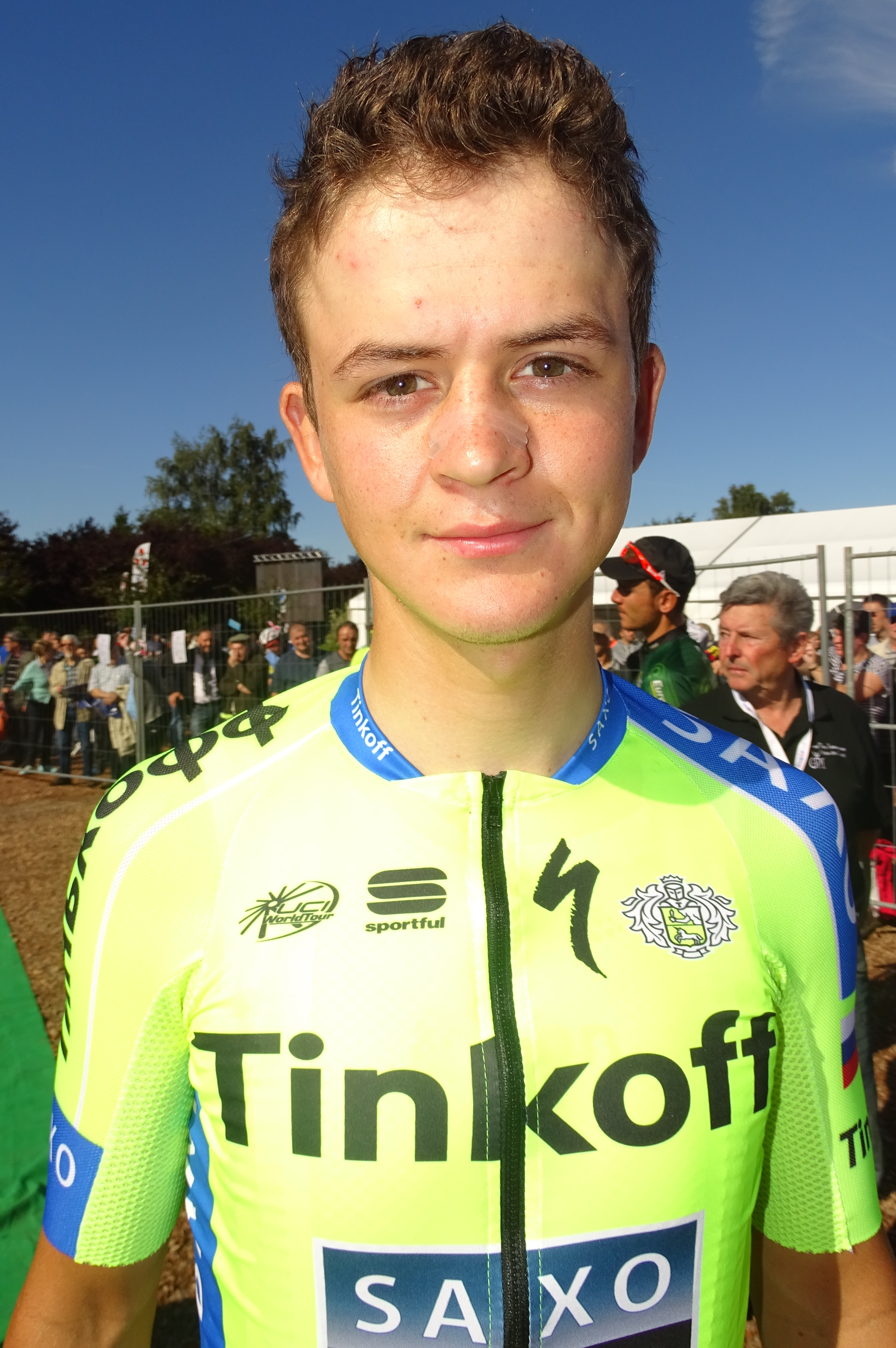
- Tolhoek in 2015.

Personal information
- Born: 29 April 1994 (age 32) Yerseke, Netherlands
- Height: 1.78 m (5 ft 10 in)
- Weight: 61 kg (134 lb; 9 st 8 lb)

Cycling career
- Sport: Cycling
- Discipline: Road
- Role: Rider
- Rider type: Climber

Amateur team
- 2014: WV De Jonge Renner

Professional teams
- 2015: Rabobank Development Team
- 2015: Tinkoff–Saxo (stagiaire)
- 2016: Roompot–Oranje Peloton
- 2017–2021: LottoNL–Jumbo
- 2022–2023: Trek–Segafredo
- 2024: Sabgal–Anicolor

Antwan Tolhoek (born 29 April 1994) is a Dutch cyclist, who last rode for UCI Continental team Sabgal–Anicolor.

== Life and career ==
Born in Yerseke, Tolhoek was named as part of the LottoNL–Jumbo squad in the startlist for the 2017 Vuelta a España. In December 2017, he was suspended for 2 months by his team, for possession of sleeping pills during a pre-season training camp – violating the team's internal rules. In July 2018, he was named in the start list for the 2018 Tour de France. In May 2019, he was named in the startlist for the 2019 Giro d'Italia.

His father Patrick Tolhoek was also a professional cyclist.

On July 16, 2025, the Union Cycliste Internationale (UCI) announced that Tolhoek had been found guilty of an anti-doping rule violation following the detection of Anabolic Androgenic Steroids (AAS) in his system. As a result, Tolhoek was handed a four-year period of ineligibility, rendering him unable to compete in any UCI-sanctioned events until February 6, 2028. In accordance with anti-doping regulations, Tolhoek retains the right to appeal the decision through the Court of Arbitration for Sport (CAS).

== Major results ==
2015
1st Mountains classification, Tour de Bretagne
2016
1st Mountains classification, Tour de Suisse
2017
4th Japan Cup
2018
2nd Japan Cup
10th Clásica de San Sebastián
2019
1st Stage 6 Tour de Suisse
4th Overall Tour of Guangxi
2021
2nd Overall Vuelta a Andalucía

=== Grand Tour general classification results timeline ===
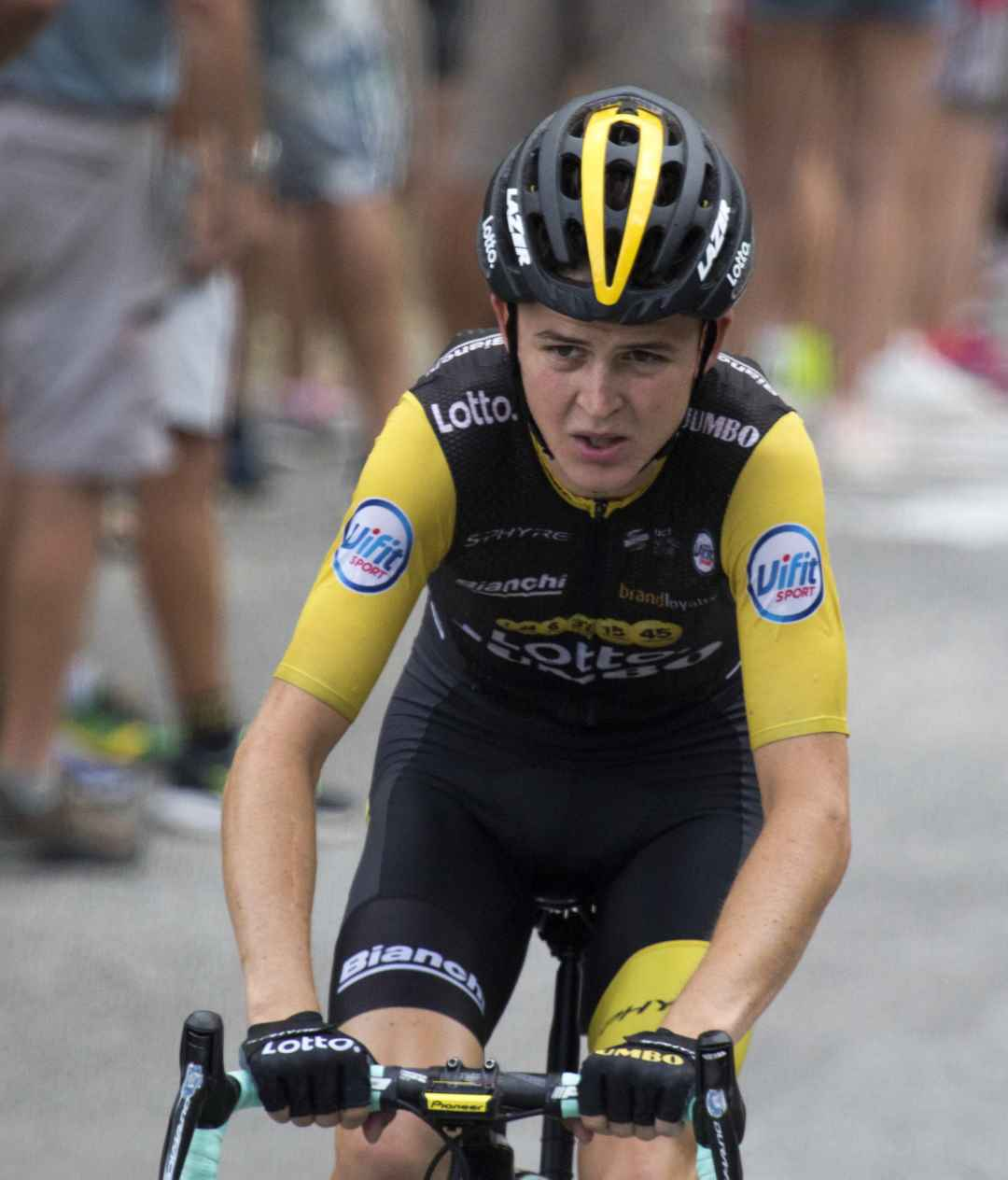
Tolhoek at the 2018 Tour de France

Grand Tour	2017	2018	2019	2020	2021
Giro d'Italia	—	—	65	DNF	—
Tour de France	—	37	—	—	—
Vuelta a España	28	—	—	—	—

Legend
—	Did not compete
DNF	Did not finish
