= Julen Amezqueta =

Spanish cyclist (born 1993)

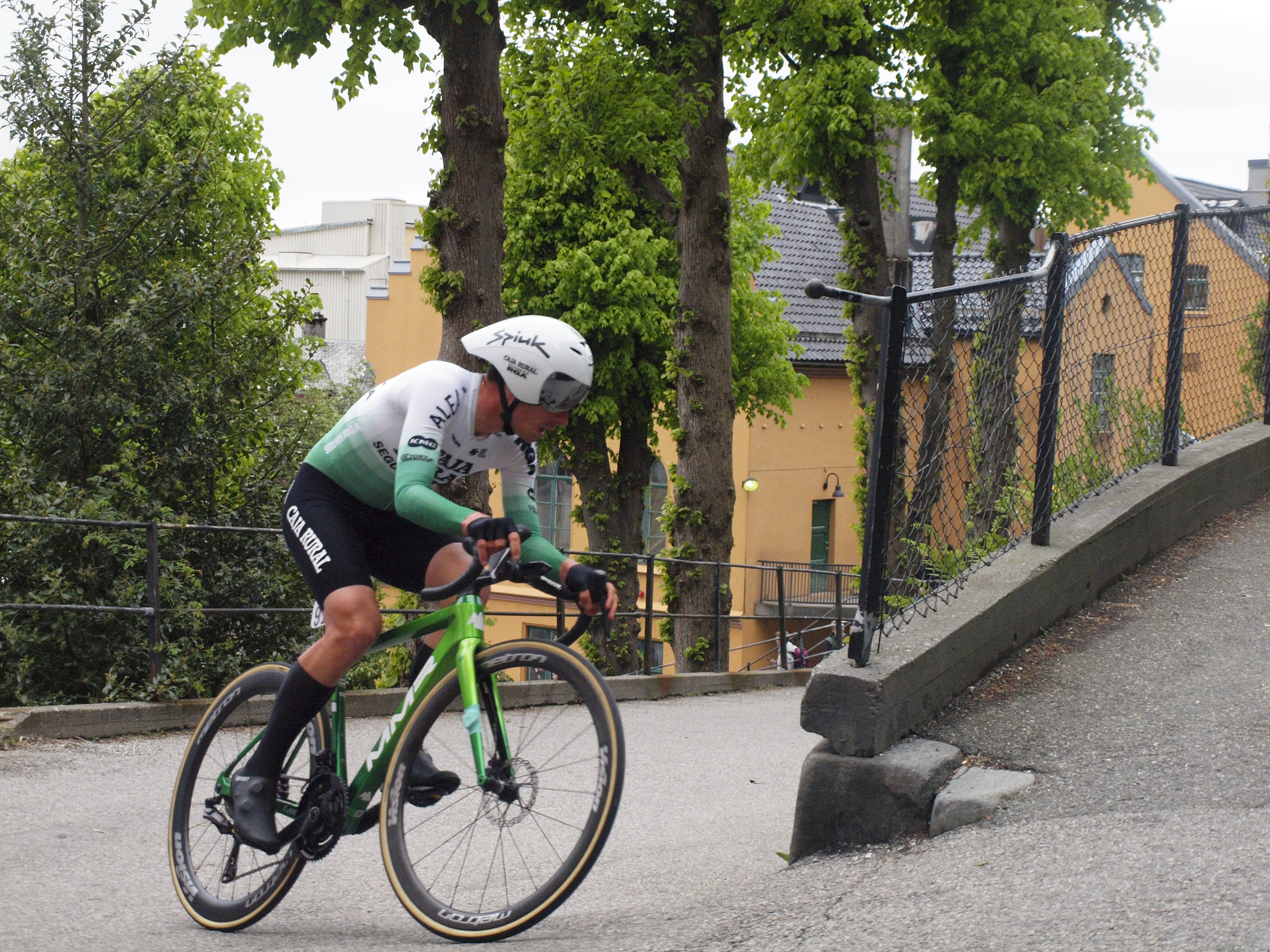
- Amezqueta at the 2023 Tour of Norway

Personal information
- Full name: Julen Amezqueta Moreno
- Born: 12 August 1993 (age 33) Estella, Spain
- Height: 1.74 m (5 ft 9 in)
- Weight: 63 kg (139 lb)

Cycling career
- Sport: Cycling
- Current team: Illes Balears Arabay
- Discipline: Road
- Role: Rider
- Rider type: Climber

Amateur teams
- 2012–2014: Seguros Bilbao
- 2015: Café Baqué–Conservas Campos

Professional teams
- 2015: Southeast Pro Cycling (stagiaire)
- 2016–2017: Southeast–Venezuela
- 2018–2023: Caja Rural–Seguros RGA
- 2024–: Illes Balears Arabay Cycling

Julen Amezqueta Moreno (born 12 August 1993 in Estella) is a Spanish cyclist, who currently rides for UCI Continental team Illes Balears Arabay.

He was named in the start list for the 2016 Giro d'Italia. In October 2020, he was named in the startlist for the 2020 Vuelta a España.

== Major results ==
2015
1st Overall Volta a Portugal do Futuro

1st Points classification
1st Stage 2

2019
6th Overall Rhône-Alpes Isère Tour
7th Classica da Arrabida
2020
1st Mountains classification Settimana Internazionale di Coppi e Bartali
2021
3rd Overall Vuelta a Andalucía
6th Vuelta a Castilla y León
7th Overall Route d'Occitanie
10th Overall Vuelta Asturias
Combativity award Stages 3, 9 & 12 Vuelta a España

=== Grand Tour general classification results timeline ===
Grand Tour	2016	2017	2018	2019	2020	2021
Giro d'Italia	112	99	—	—	—	—
Tour de France	—	—	—	—	—	—
Vuelta a España	—	—	—	—	50	43

Legend
—	Did not compete
DNF	Did not finish
