= Illes Balears Arabay Cycling =

Spanish cycling team

Team information
- UCI code: IBA
- Registered: Spain
- Founded: 2024
- Discipline: Road
- Status: UCI Continental
- Bicycles: Ridley

Key personnel
- General manager: Lluís Mas
- Team managers: Daniel Navarro; Marc Buades

Team name history
- 2024–: Illes Balears Arabay Cycling

Illes Balears Arabay Cycling is a Spanish UCI Continental cycling team founded in 2024.

== Team roster ==
As of 10 February 2024.

Rider	Date of birth
Julen Amezqueta (ESP)	12 August 1993 (age 33)
Gonzalo Ariño (ESP)	24 November 1999 (age 26)
Edgar Curto (ESP)	28 June 1999 (age 27)
Sergi Darder (ESP)	30 June 2003 (age 23)
Unai Esparza (ESP)	2 June 2000 (age 26)
José María García (ESP)	17 November 1998 (age 27)

Rider	Date of birth
Arnau Gilabert (ESP)	24 August 2002 (age 24)
Asier Pablo Gonzalez (ESP)	14 September 1999 (age 26)
Pau Llaneras (ESP)	26 January 1999 (age 27)
Alex Molenaar (NED)	13 July 1999 (age 27)
Joan Albert Riera (ESP)	23 October 2000 (age 25)
Andrew Vollmer (USA)	5 September 2000 (age 26)
