= Gianni Meersman =

Belgian road bicycle racer

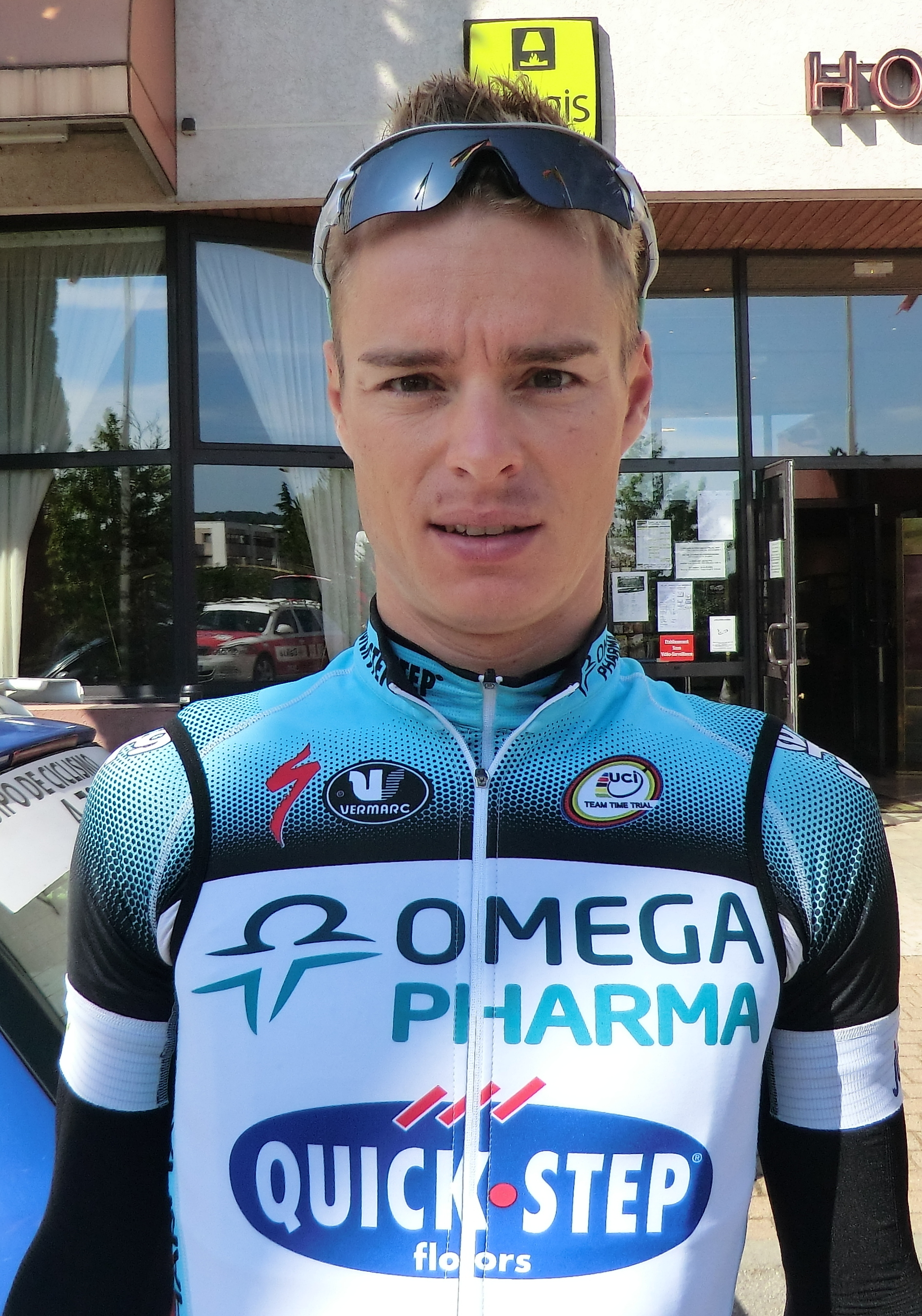
- Meersman at the 2013 Tour de l'Ain.

Personal information
- Full name: Gianni Meersman
- Nickname: Merrie
- Born: 5 December 1985 (age 40) Meulebeke, West Flanders, Belgium
- Height: 1.77 m (5 ft 10 in)
- Weight: 63 kg (139 lb)

Cycling career
- Sport: Cycling
- Current team: Pauwels Sauzen–Altez Industriebouw Cycling Team
- Disciplines: Road; Track
- Role: Rider (retired); Directeur sportif
- Rider type: Attacker; Stage hunter

Professional teams
- 2007: Discovery Channel
- 2008–2011: Française des Jeux
- 2012: Lotto–Belisol
- 2013–2016: Omega Pharma–Quick-Step

Managerial team
- 2017–: Marlux–Napoleon Games (directeur sportif)

Major wins
- Grand Tours Vuelta a España 2 individual stages (2016) Stage races Tour de Wallonie (2014) One-day races and Classics Great Ocean Road Race (2015) Handzame Classic (2015)

Gianni Meersman (born 5 December 1985) is a Belgian former professional track and road bicycle racer, who rode professionally between 2007 and 2016 for the Discovery Channel, FDJ, Lotto–Belisol and Etixx–Quick-Step teams. He currently works as a directeur sportif for the Pauwels Sauzen–Altez Industriebouw Cycling Team team.

After stage 3 of the 2007 Tour de Georgia, Meersman was forced to abandon the race due to a severe case of patella tendinitis. He treated the riders of the Grand Peloton, a charity fundraiser ride, to his presence as the Peloton Captain of the "Blue Peloton". Meersman finally came to Grand Tour prominence, after 10 years as a professional racer, at the 2016 Vuelta a España winning two stages in bunch sprints. During the race, Fortuneo–Vital Concept announced that Meersman had agreed a one-year contract with the team for 2017. However, a diagnosis of cardiac arrhythmia and scar tissue on his heart forced Meersman to announce his retirement on 30 December 2016. On 11 October 2017, Meersman was confirmed as the new sporting director for cyclo-cross team Marlux–Napoleon Games.

== Major results ==
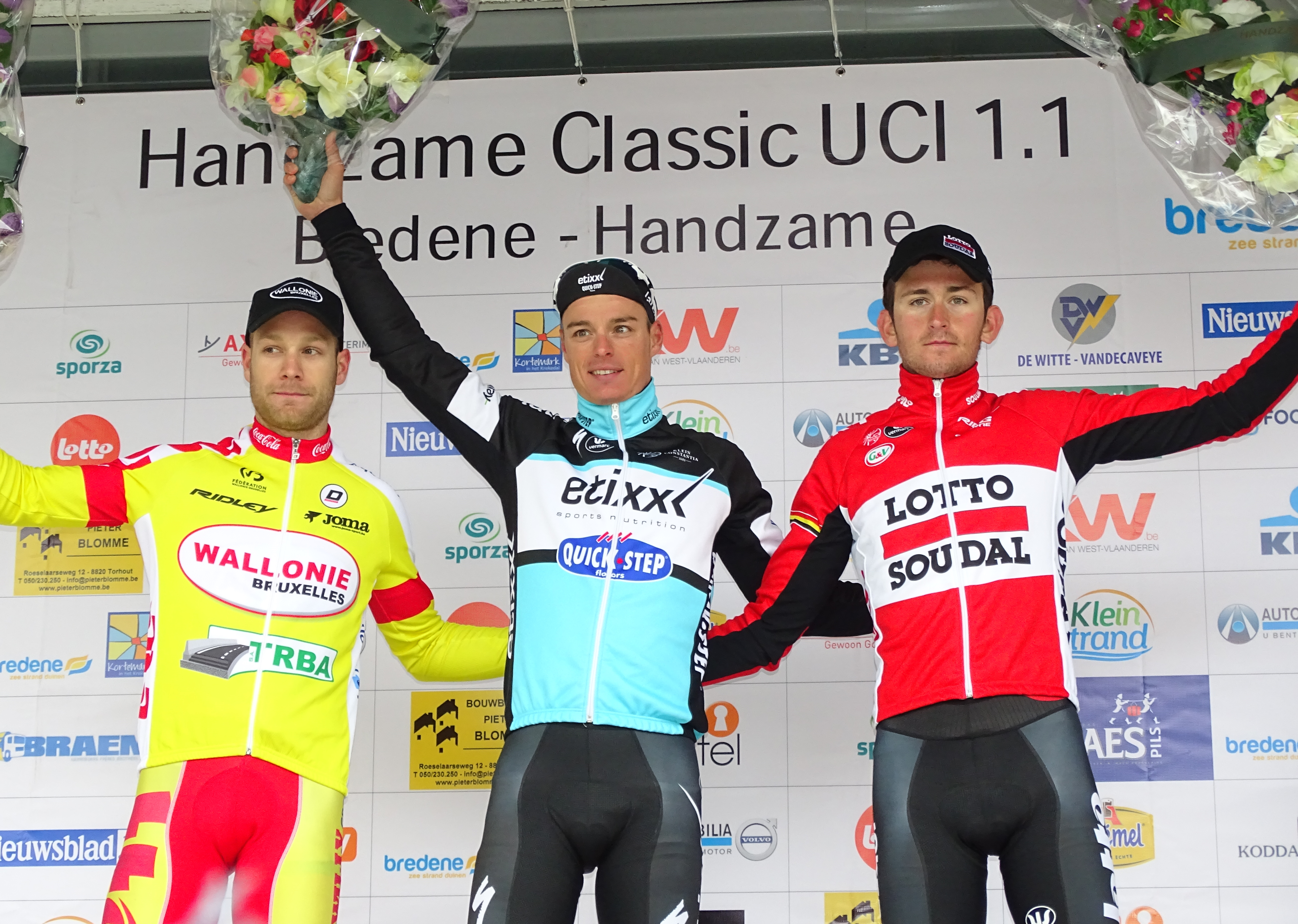
Meersman (centre) on the podium after winning the 2015 Handzame Classic. Also pictured are Antoine Demoitié (left) and Tiesj Benoot (right).

2002
2nd Time trial, National Junior Road Championships
2004
1st Circuit de Wallonie
10th Grand Prix Criquielion
2005
1st Stage 1 Ronde de l'Isard
3rd Flèche Ardennaise
7th Road race, UCI Under-23 Road World Championships
8th Overall Le Triptyque des Monts et Châteaux
2006
2nd Zellik–Galmaarden
6th Overall Circuit des Ardennes
2007
1st Stage 5 Tour of Austria
1st Stage 3 Tour de Georgia
7th Overall Tour of Belgium
8th Overall Driedaagse van West-Vlaanderen
2008
1st Stage 4 Tour de Wallonie
2nd Overall Étoile de Bessèges
3rd Trophée des Grimpeurs
3rd Grand Prix de Plumelec-Morbihan
6th Overall Four Days of Dunkirk
9th Overall Circuit de Lorraine
2010
2nd Overall Paris–Corrèze
2011
1st Overall Circuit des Ardennes

1st Points classification
1st Stage 2

2nd Road race, National Road Championships
2nd Paris–Troyes
2nd Route Adélie
3rd Halle–Ingooigem
4th Flèche d'Emeraude
7th Overall Settimana Internazionale di Coppi e Bartali
8th Brabantse Pijl
10th Overall Ster ZLM Toer
2012
1st Stage 4 Paris–Nice
2nd Overall Tour de Wallonie
3rd Clásica de San Sebastián
10th Overall Volta ao Algarve

1st Stage 1

2013
Volta a Catalunya

1st Stages 1 & 2

Tour de Romandie

1st Stages 1 & 3

1st Prologue Tour de l'Ain
1st Points classification, Critérium du Dauphiné
2nd Road race, National Road Championships
6th Les Boucles du Sud Ardèche
6th Eschborn-Frankfurt City Loop
7th Trofeo Platja de Muro
2014
1st Overall Tour de Wallonie

1st Points classification
1st Stage 5

1st Trofeo Muro-Port d'Alcúdia
Tour de l'Ain

1st Prologue & Stage 2

3rd Overall Ster ZLM Toer
3rd Trofeo Ses Salines
3rd La Drôme Classic
4th Overall Tour de Picardie
4th Trofeo Palma
6th Grand Prix Cycliste de Québec
7th Grand Prix Impanis-Van Petegem
9th Classic Sud-Ardèche
2015
1st Cadel Evans Great Ocean Road Race
1st Handzame Classic
1st Stage 1 Volta ao Algarve
2nd Le Samyn
6th Down Under Classic
2016
Vuelta a España

1st Stages 2 & 5
Held after Stages 2 & 5–9

2nd Overall Tour de Wallonie
3rd Handzame Classic
8th Münsterland Giro

=== Grand Tour general classification results timeline ===
Grand Tour	2008	2009	2010	2011	2012	2013	2014	2015	2016
Giro d'Italia	—	—	—	—	DNF	—	—	DNF	—
Tour de France	—	—	—	77	—	—	—	—	—
Vuelta a España	DNF	—	98	—	57	58	—	—	111

Legend
—	Did not compete
DNF	Did not finish
