= Jarl Salomein =

Belgian road cyclist

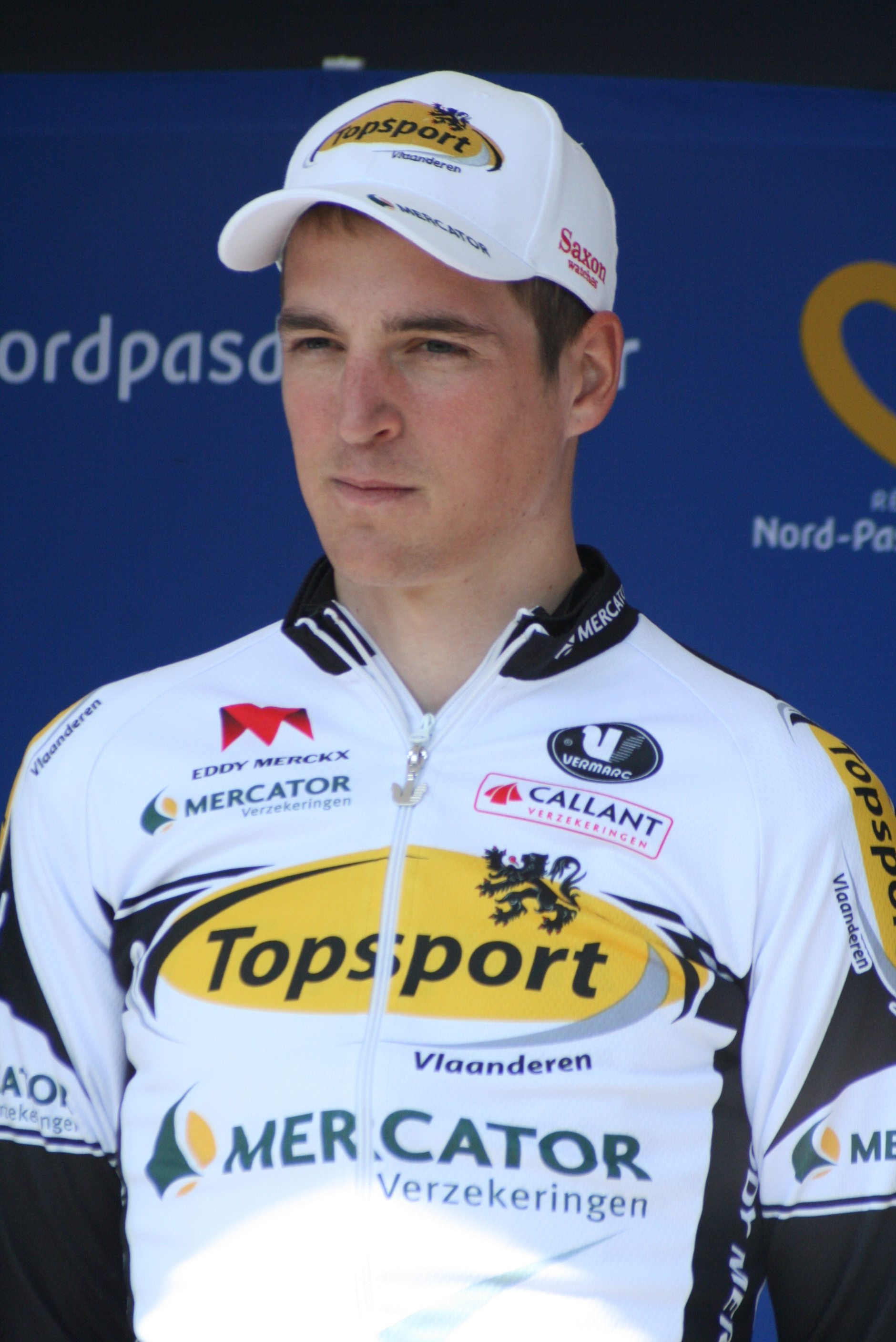
- Salomein in 2011

Personal information
- Full name: Jarl Salomein
- Born: 27 January 1989 (age 37) Ghent, Belgium
- Height: 193 cm (6 ft 4 in)
- Weight: 80 kg (176 lb)

Cycling career
- Sport: Cycling
- Current team: Retired
- Discipline: Road
- Role: Rider

Professional team
- 2011–2017: Topsport Vlaanderen–Mercator

Jarl Salomein (born 27 January 1989 in Ghent) is a Belgian former professional cyclist, who competed professionally for Sport Vlaanderen–Baloise between 2011 and 2017.

== Major results ==
2007
1st Overall Route de l'Avenir
2nd Road race, National Junior Road Championships
7th Paris–Roubaix Juniors
2009
10th Memorial Van Coningsloo
2010
1st Omloop Het Nieuwsblad U23
1st Stage 1 Ronde de l'Oise
2nd Grand Prix Criquielion
7th Dwars door de Antwerpse Kempen
8th Paris–Tours Espoirs
9th Ronde van Vlaanderen U23
10th Beverbeek Classic
2013
9th Nationale Sluitingsprijs
2015
1st Mountains classification Three Days of De Panne
5th Omloop van het Waasland
5th Velothon Berlin
8th Handzame Classic
9th Internationale Wielertrofee Jong Maar Moedig
2016
9th Antwerpse Havenpijl
2017
8th Internationale Wielertrofee Jong Maar Moedig
8th Grand Prix de Fourmies
10th Nationale Sluitingsprijs
