= Frank Francken =

Belgian cyclist

Personal information
- Born: 22 May 1964 (age 62) Essen, Belgium

Cycling career
- Sport: Cycling

Frank Francken (born 22 May 1964) is a Belgian former cyclist. He competed in the road race at the 1988 Summer Olympics.
