= Neufchâteau, Liège =

District of Dalhem, Liège Province, Wallonia, Belgium

Coordinates: 50.7200°N 5.7764°E

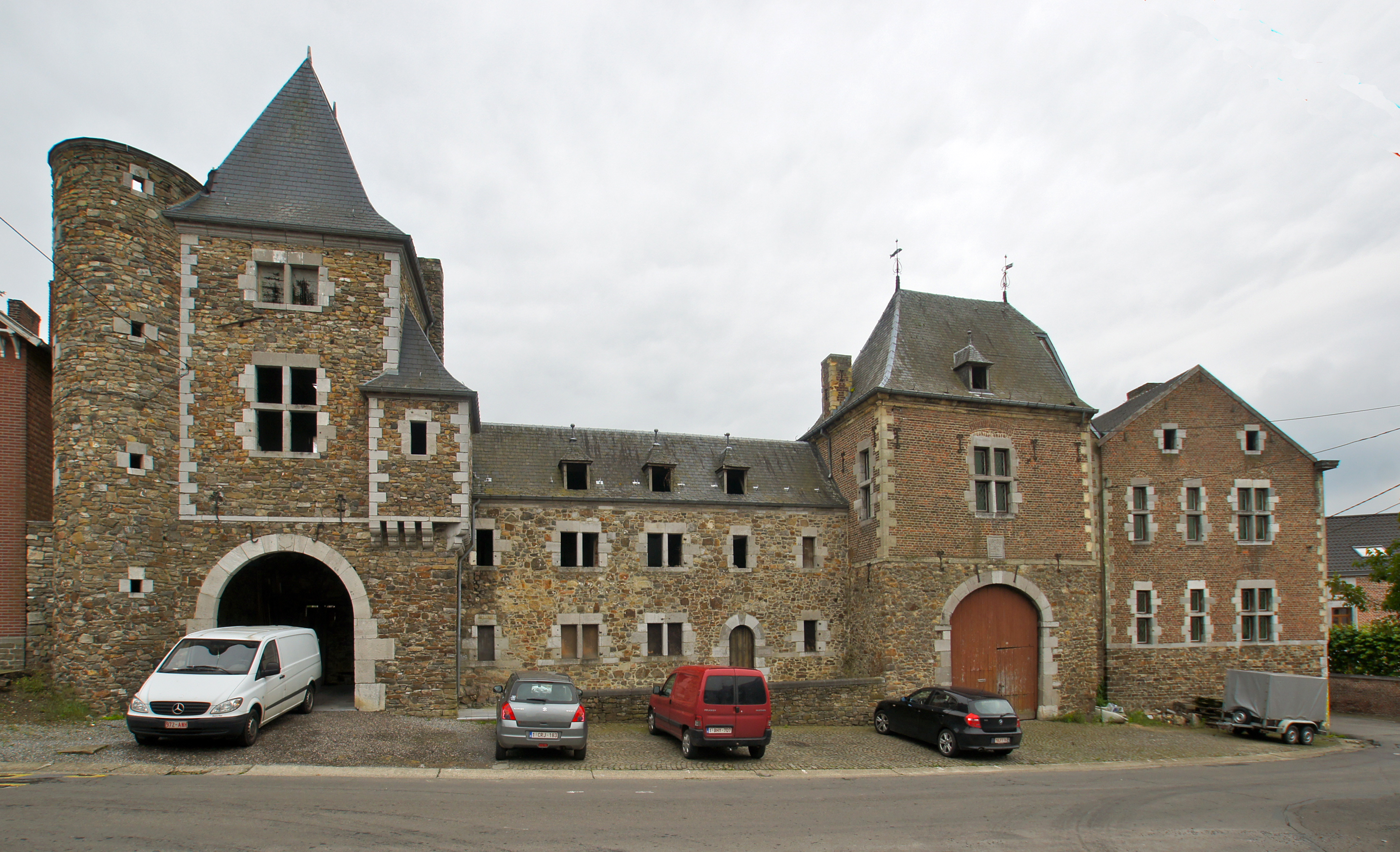
A Castle in Neufchâteau, Liège

Neufchâteau (Walloon: Noû Tchestê) is a village of Wallonia and a district of the municipality of Dalhem, located in the province of Liège, Belgium.

Prior to 1977 Neufchâteau was a municipality of its own. As of 2005, it has 854 inhabitants.
