= Zico Waeytens =

Belgian cyclist

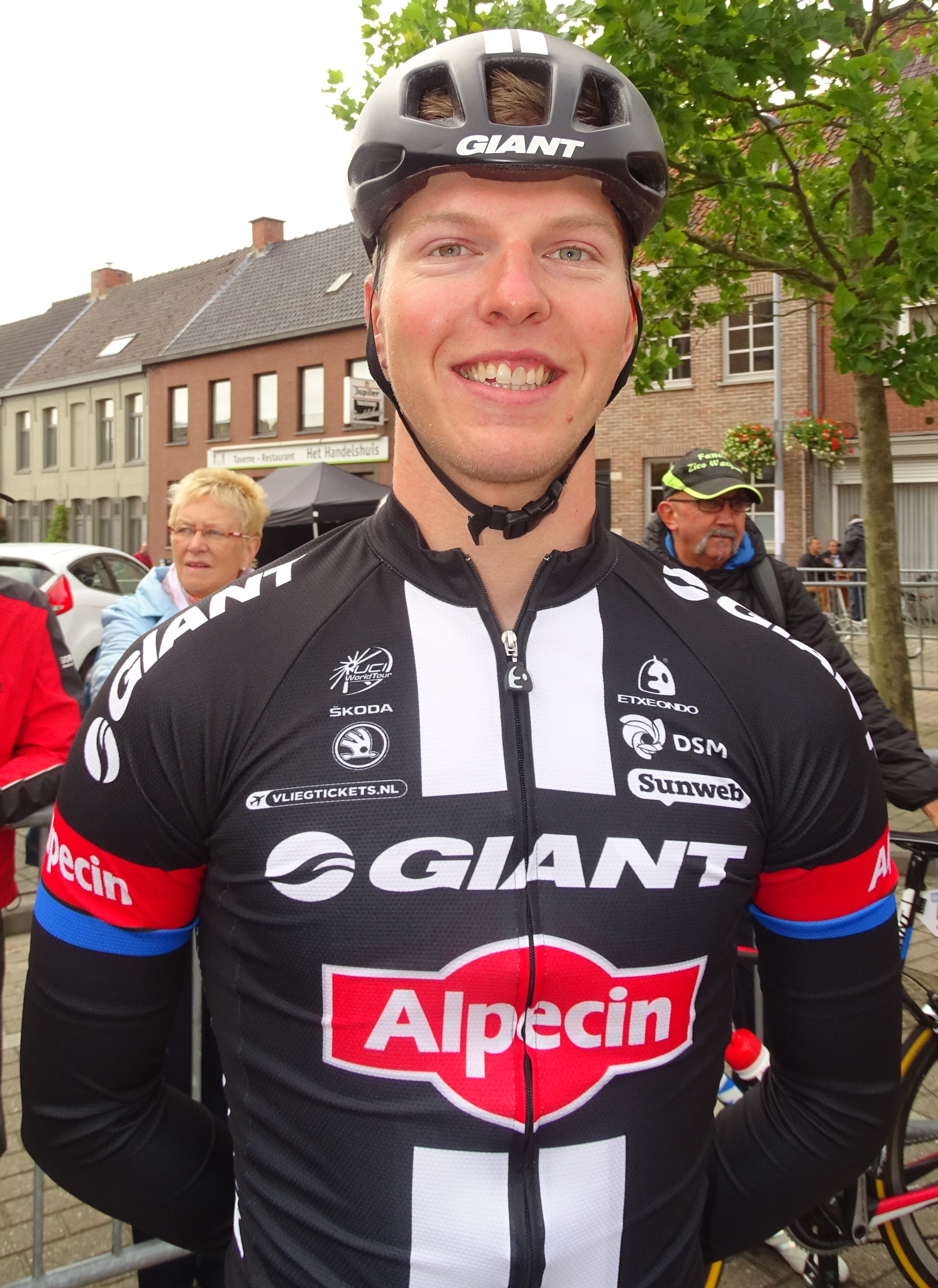
- Waeytens in 2015

Personal information
- Full name: Zico Waeytens
- Born: 29 September 1991 (age 35) Ledegem, Belgium
- Height: 1.80 m (5 ft 11 in)
- Weight: 67 kg (148 lb)

Cycling career
- Sport: Cycling
- Current team: Retired
- Discipline: Road
- Role: Rider

Amateur teams
- 2010–2011: Davo–Lotto
- 2011: Topsport Vlaanderen–Mercator (stagiaire)

Professional teams
- 2012–2014: Topsport Vlaanderen–Mercator
- 2015–2017: Team Giant–Alpecin
- 2018: Vérandas Willems–Crelan
- 2019: Cofidis

Zico Waeytens (born 29 September 1991 in Ledegem) is a Belgian former professional cyclist, who rode professionally between 2012 and 2019 for the Topsport Vlaanderen–Baloise, Team Sunweb, Vérandas Willems–Crelan and Cofidis teams. He was named in the start list for the 2015 Vuelta a España.

Waeytens retired from cycling at the end of the 2019 season to pursue a career in boxing.

== Major results ==
2008
3rd Road race, National Junior Road Championships
2009
1st Overall Tour d'Istria

1st Stage 2

1st Overall Liège–La Gleize
4th Remouchamps–Ferrières–Remouchamps
10th Road race, UEC European Junior Road Championships
2010
3rd Grand Prix de Waregem
10th Overall Oberösterreich Rundfahrt
2011
1st Flèche Ardennaise
5th De Vlaamse Pijl
9th Overall Danmark Rundt
2012
6th Omloop van het Waasland
7th Schaal Sels
2013
3rd Overall Tour des Fjords
7th Grand Prix de Wallonie
2014
3rd Grote Prijs Stad Zottegem
5th Overall Tour de Wallonie

1st Sprints classification

9th Le Samyn
9th Kattekoers
9th Internationale Wielertrofee Jong Maar Moedig
2015
3rd Velothon Berlin
6th Overall Ster ZLM Toer
2016
1st Stage 4 Tour of Belgium
2018
10th Great War Remembrance Race
2019
5th Grand Prix La Marseillaise
10th Tacx Pro Classic

=== Grand Tour general classification results timeline ===
Grand Tour	2015	2016
Giro d'Italia	—	—
Tour de France	—	—
Vuelta a España	157	DNF

Legend
—	Did not compete
DNF	Did not finish
