= Sander Helven =

Belgian road cyclist

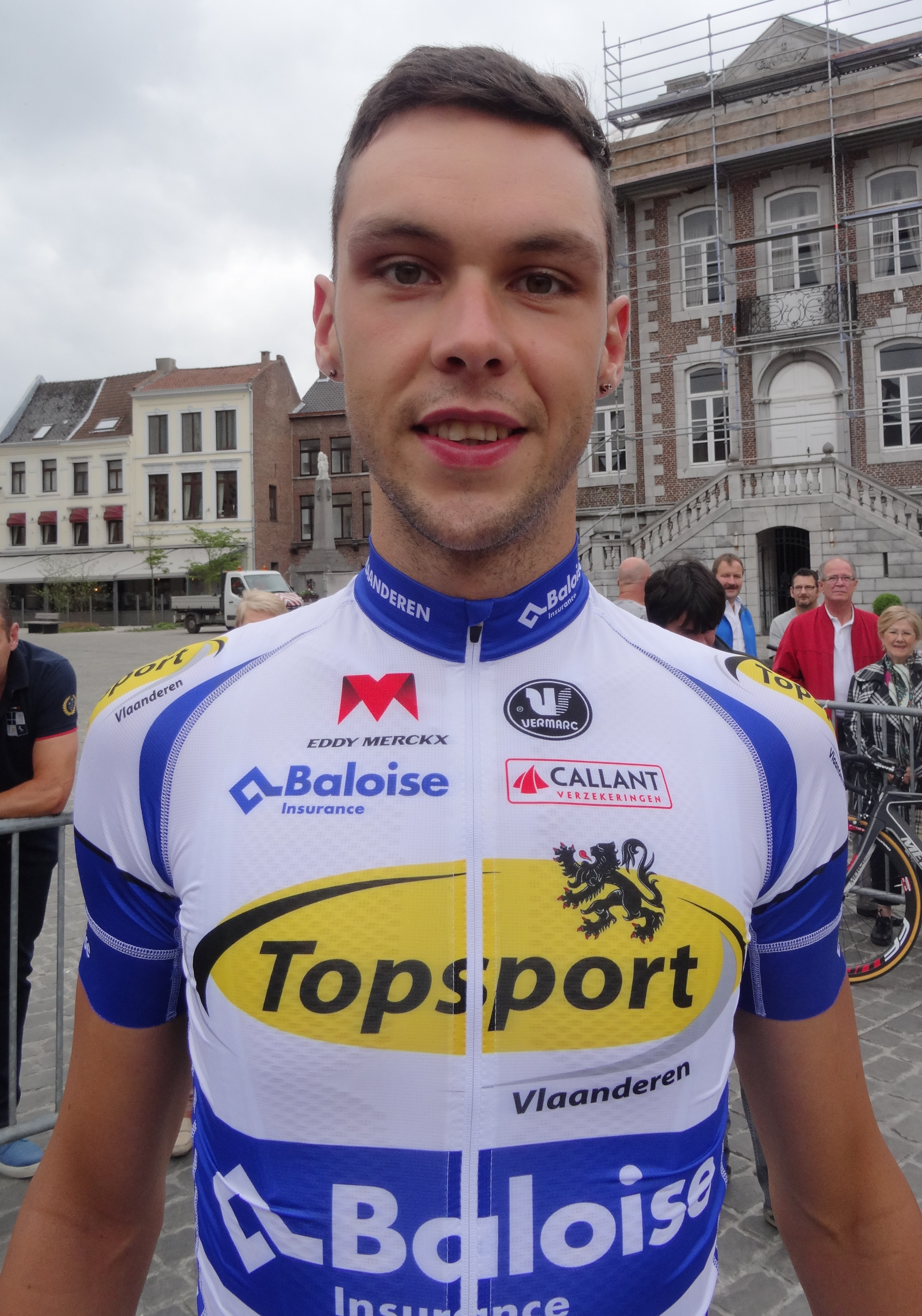
- Helven in 2014

Personal information
- Full name: Sander Helven
- Born: 30 May 1990 (age 36) Hasselt
- Height: 197 cm (6 ft 6 in)
- Weight: 74 kg (163 lb)

Cycling career
- Sport: Cycling
- Current team: Retired
- Discipline: Road
- Role: Rider

Amateur teams
- 2009–2010: Lotto–Belisol U23
- 2012: Ovyta–Eijssen–Acrog
- 2017: Balen BC

Professional teams
- 2011: Donckers Koffie–Jelly Belly
- 2013–2016: Topsport Vlaanderen–Baloise

Sander Helven (born 30 May 1990 in Hasselt) is a Belgian former cyclist, who rode professionally between 2011 and 2016 for the Donckers Koffie–Jelly Belly and Topsport Vlaanderen–Baloise teams.

== Major results ==
2011
2nd National Under-23 Road Race Championships
2012
1st Omloop Het Nieuwsblad U23
3rd Flèche Ardennaise
2013
3rd GP Briek Schotte
2014
1st Stage 1 Étoile de Bessèges
2016
1st Mountains classification Tour du Poitou Charentes
