= Arthur Vanoverberghe =

Belgian cyclist

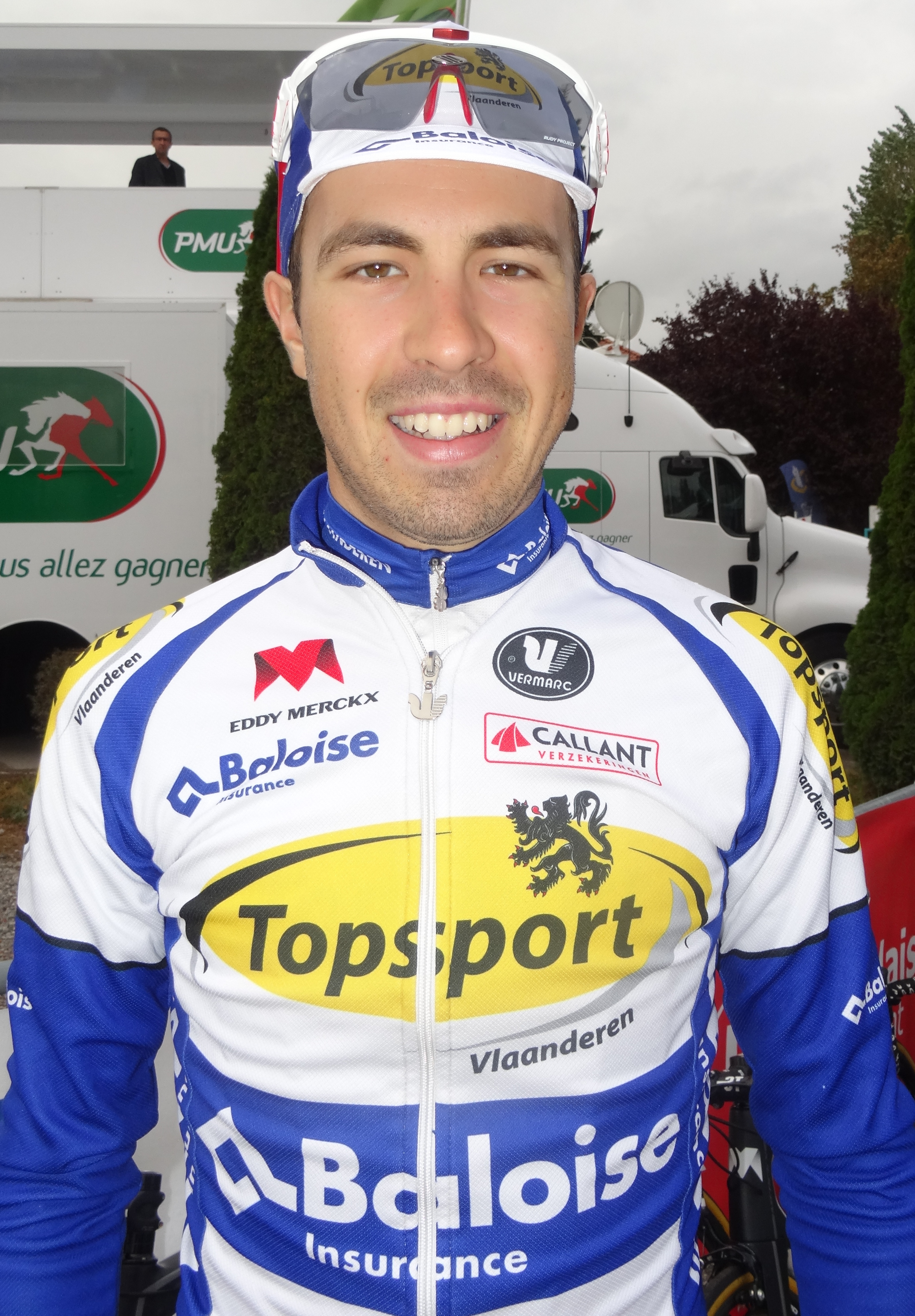
- Arthur Vanoverberghe in 2014

Personal information
- Born: 7 February 1990 (age 36) Menen, Belgium
- Height: 1.81 m (5 ft 11 in)
- Weight: 65 kg (143 lb)

Cycling career
- Sport: Cycling
- Current team: Retired
- Discipline: Road
- Role: Rider

Amateur team
- 2011: Ovyta–Eijssen–Acrog

Professional team
- 2012–2015: Topsport Vlaanderen–Mercator

Arthur Vanoverberghe (born 7 February 1990) is a Belgian former racing cyclist. He rode at the 2013 UCI Road World Championships.

== Major results ==
2007
1st Stage 3a (TTT) Sint-Martinusprijs Kontich
2008
National Junior Road Championships

1st Road race
1st Time trial

1st Omloop Mandel-Leie-Schelde Juniors
2010
2nd Grand Prix de Waregem
3rd Overall Tour de Liège
2011
3rd Time trial, National Under-23 Road Championships
2015
5th De Kustpijl
