= Kévin Van Melsen =

Belgian road cyclist

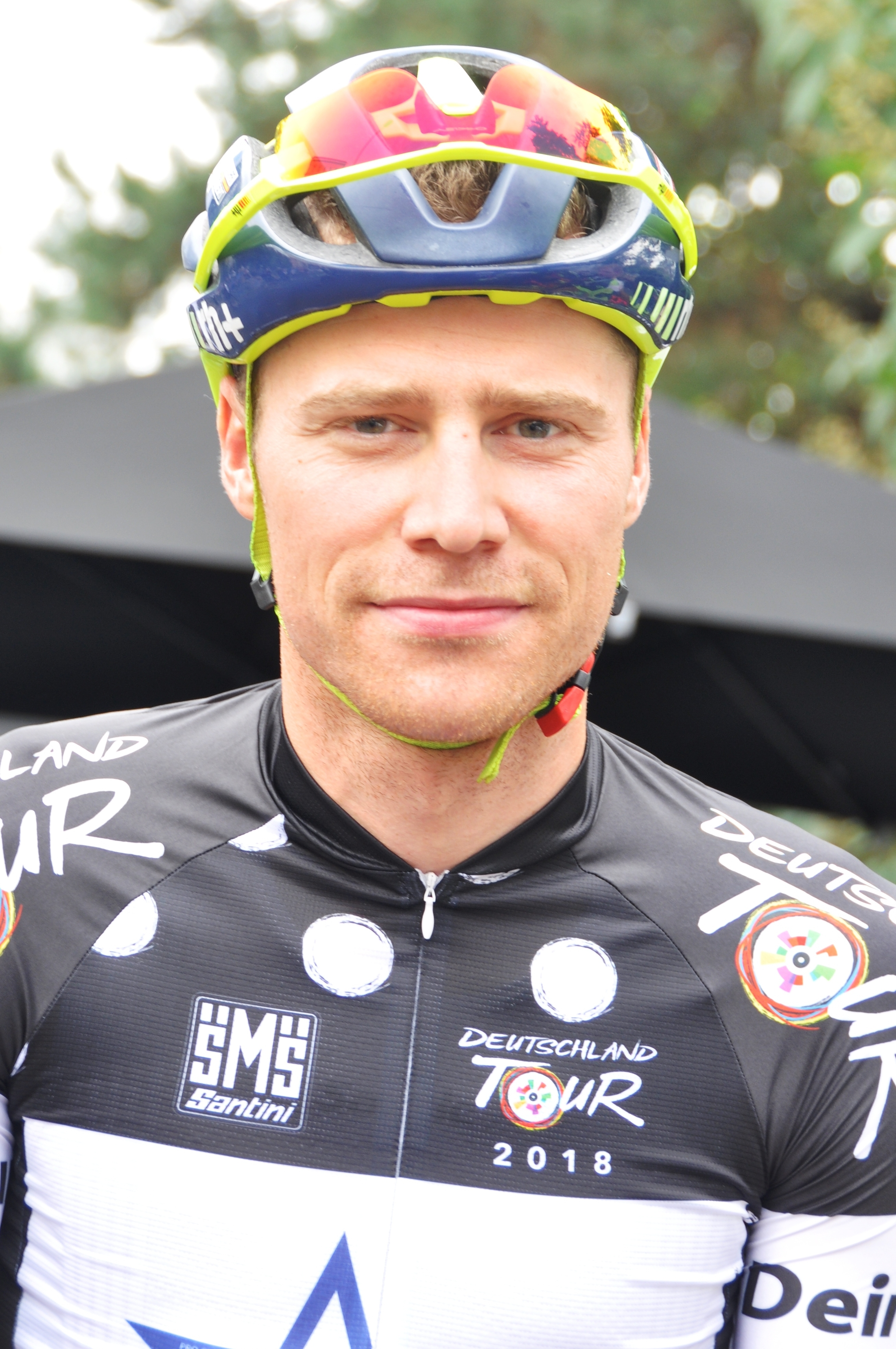
- Van Melsen in 2018

Personal information
- Full name: Kevin Van Melsen
- Born: 1 April 1987 (age 39) Verviers, Belgium
- Height: 1.85 m (6 ft 1 in)
- Weight: 78 kg (172 lb)

Cycling career
- Sport: Cycling
- Current team: Wanty–Nippo–ReUz
- Discipline: Road
- Role: Rider; Directeur sportif

Amateur team
- 2007–2008: Pôle Continental Wallon–Bodysol–Euromillions

Professional teams
- 2009–2020: Verandas Willems
- 2021–2022: Intermarché–Wanty–Gobert Matériaux

Managerial team
- 2023–: Circus–ReUz–Technord

Kévin Van Melsen (born 1 April 1987) is a Belgian former racing cyclist, who competed as a professional from 2009 to 2022. He now works as a directeur sportif for UCI Continental team Wanty–Nippo–ReUz. He rode at the 2014 UCI Road World Championships. In July 2019, he was named in the startlist for the 2019 Tour de France.

== Major results ==
2005
1st Road race, National Junior Road Championships
6th Overall GP Général Patton
7th Ronde van Vlaanderen Juniores
8th Circuit de la Région Wallonne
9th Chrono des Nations juniors
2009
5th Grand Prix Criquielion
2010
3rd Memorial Van Coningsloo
2014
1st Mountains classification Tour de Wallonie
1st Mountains classification Tour du Poitou-Charentes
2018
7th Polynormande
8th Grand Prix de la Ville de Lillers

=== Grand Tour general classification results timeline ===
Grand Tour	2019	2020	2021
Giro d'Italia	—	—	—
Tour de France	138	—	—
Vuelta a España	—	—	126

Legend
—	Did not compete
DNF	Did not finish
