= Thomas Sprengers =

Belgian cyclist (born 1990)

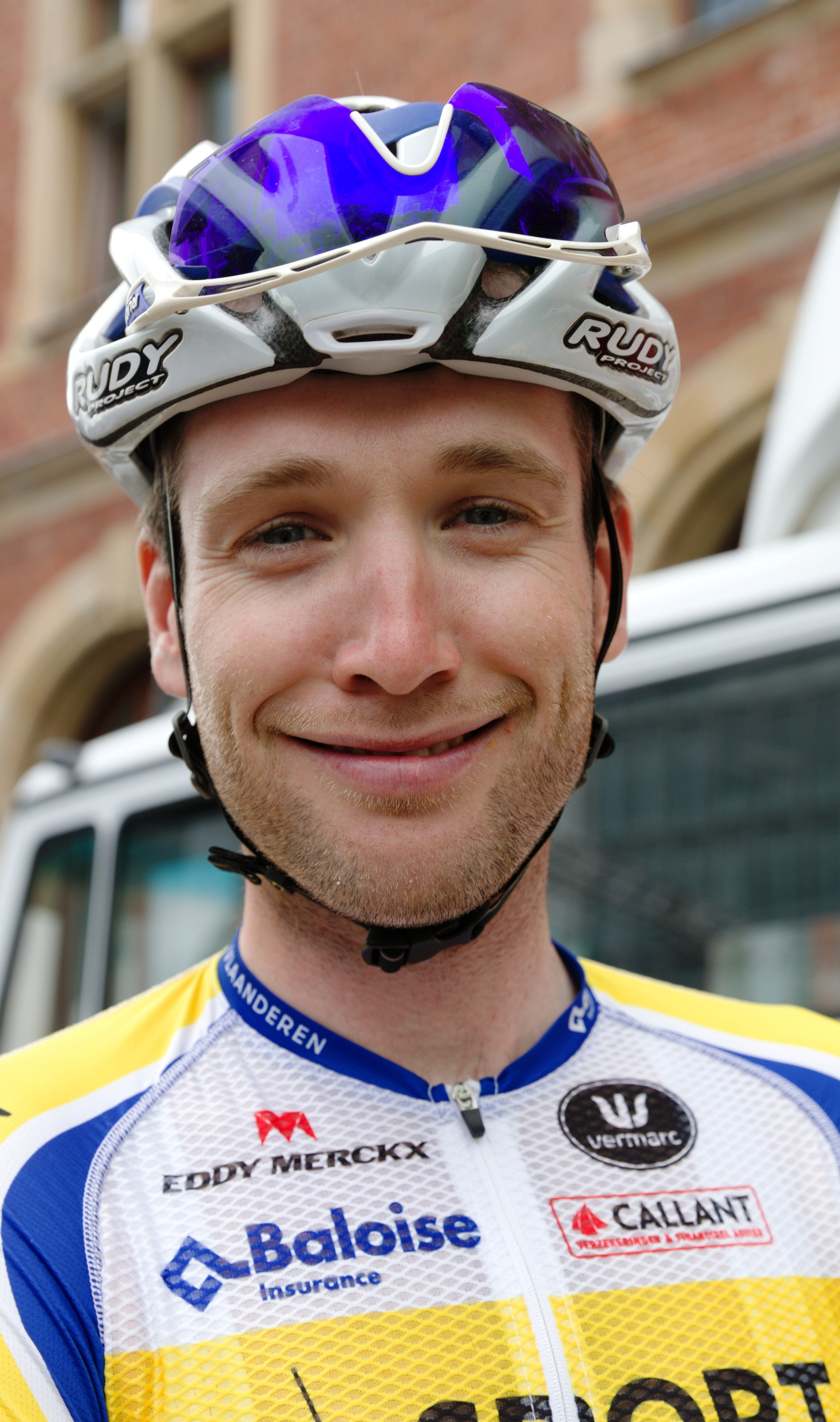
- Sprengers in 2018

Personal information
- Full name: Thomas Sprengers
- Born: 5 February 1990 (age 36) Leuven, Belgium
- Height: 177 cm (5 ft 10 in)
- Weight: 60 kg (132 lb)

Cycling career
- Sport: Cycling
- Current team: Retired
- Discipline: Road
- Role: Rider

Amateur teams
- 2008: Avia
- 2009–2010: Beveren 2000
- 2011–2012: Omega Pharma–Lotto Davo

Professional teams
- 2012: Lotto–Belisol (stagiaire)
- 2013–2021: Topsport Vlaanderen–Baloise

Thomas Sprengers (born 5 February 1990) is a Belgian former professional cyclist, who competed as a professional from 2013 to 2021 for Topsport Vlaanderen–Baloise.

== Major results ==
2008
1st Team pursuit, National Junior Track Championships (with Tosh Van der Sande, Alphonse Vermote & Simon Verhamme)
3rd Grand Prix Général Patton
2011
1st Mountains classification Tour de Liège
2012
1st Overall Tour de Liège
1st Stage 3 Tour de Moselle
3rd Overall Tour d'Eure-et-Loir

1st Stage 4

7th Circuit de Wallonie
2014
1st Mountains classification Circuit de la Sarthe
5th Rund um den Finanzplatz Eschborn-Frankfurt
10th Cholet-Pays de Loire
10th Coppa Ugo Agostoni
2015
3rd Tour de Vendée
8th Overall Tour du Limousin
10th Overall Tour du Gévaudan Languedoc-Roussillon
2016
9th Overall Tour du Limousin
2017
5th Circuito de Getxo
9th Rund um Köln
10th Overall Tour de Wallonie
2018
8th Overall Tour de Luxembourg
9th Brabantse Pijl
10th Grand Prix d'Isbergues
2020
6th Paris–Chauny
7th Trofeo Serra de Tramuntana
2021
1st Sprints classification Vuelta a Andalucía
