= Pieter Jacobs =

Belgian road bicycle racer

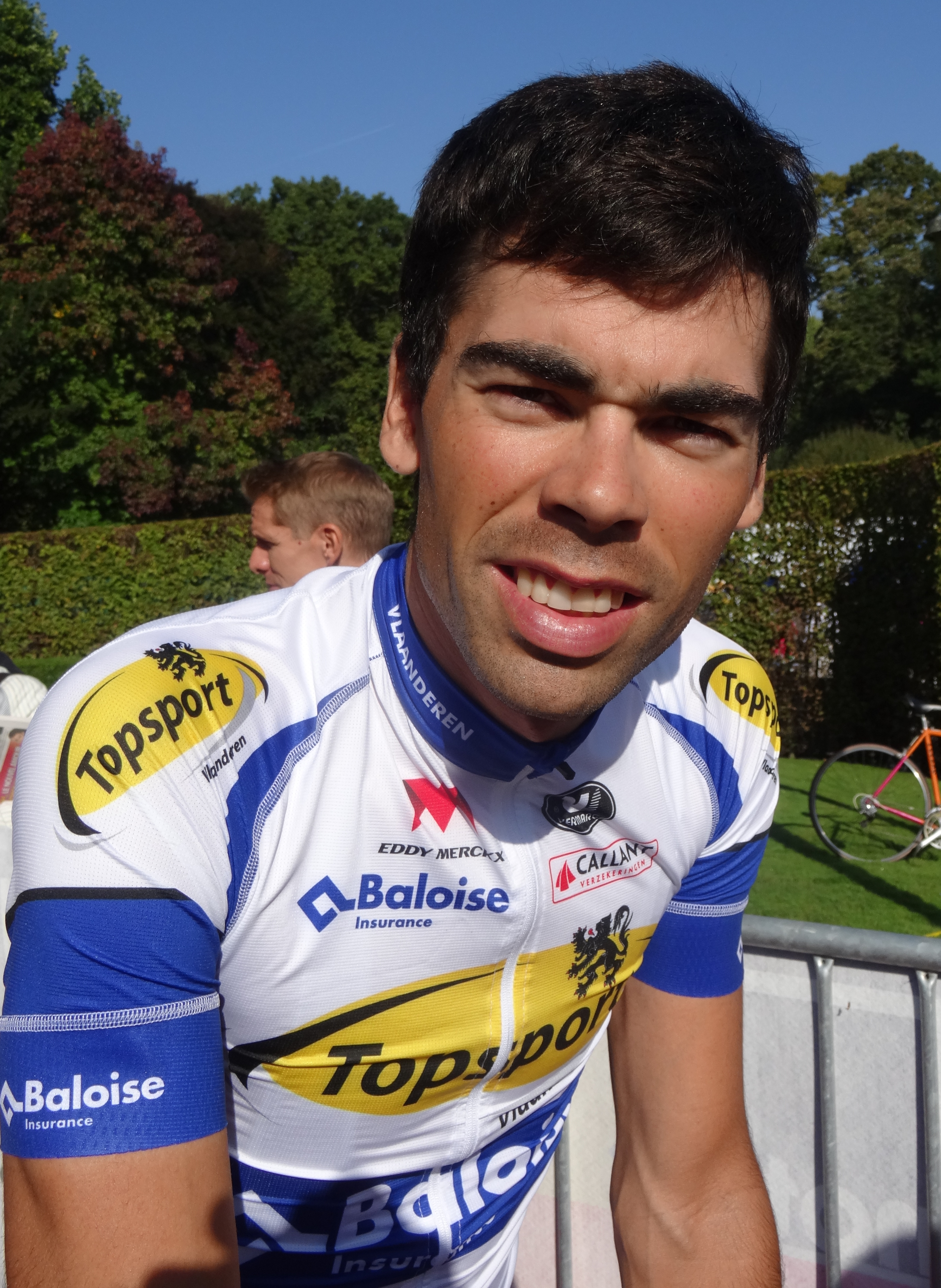
- Jacobs in 2014.

Personal information
- Full name: Pieter Jacobs
- Born: 6 June 1986 (age 40) Brasschaat, Belgium

Cycling career
- Sport: Cycling
- Current team: Retired
- Discipline: Road
- Role: Rider

Amateur teams
- 2005–2006: Davo CT
- 2006: Unibet.com (stagiaire)
- 2017–2019: Hubo Aerts Action Bike CT

Professional teams
- 2007: Unibet.com
- 2008–2009: Silence–Lotto
- 2010–2015: Topsport Vlaanderen–Mercator
- 2016: Crelan–Vastgoedservice

Pieter Jacobs (born 6 June 1986 in Brasschaat) is a Belgian former professional road bicycle racer, who competed professionally between 2007 and 2016 for the Unibet.com, Silence–Lotto, Topsport Vlaanderen–Baloise and Crelan–Vastgoedservice teams.

== Major results ==
2002
1st National Under-17 Road Race Championships
2004
1st, Classique des Alpes – U19 version
2007
5th, Tour of Ireland
2008
4th, GP Kanton Aargau - Gippingen
3rd, Presidential Cycling Tour of Turkey
3rd, Hel van het Mergelland
2011
2nd, Halle–Ingooigem
2013
1st, Omloop van het Waasland
1st, Schaal Sels-Merksem
2nd, Rund um Köln
7th, Cholet-Pays de Loire
9th, Classic Loire Atlantique
2014
4th, Eschborn-Frankfurt City Loop
7th Overall, Four Days of Dunkirk
