= Christophe Sercu =

Belgian cycling team manager

Personal information
- Born: 16 October 1970 (age 55)

Cycling career
- Sport: Cycling
- Current team: Team Flanders–Baloise
- Discipline: Road
- Role: Team manager

Managerial teams
- 2000–2004: Lotto–Adecco
- 2004–: Vlaanderen–T Interim

Christophe Sercu (born 16 October 1970) is a Belgian cycling manager, who currently works as the general manager of UCI ProTeam Team Flanders–Baloise.

He is the son of former cycling champion Patrick Sercu. He is involved in organizing some cycling races.

From 2000 until 2004, he was General Manager of the Lotto–Adecco cycling teams.
