= Team Flanders–Baloise =

Belgian cycling team

Team information
- UCI code: TFB
- Registered: Belgium
- Founded: 1994
- Discipline: Road
- Status: UCI ProTeam
- Bicycles: Eddy Merckx
- Website: Team home page

Key personnel
- General manager: Christophe Sercu

Team name history
- 1994–2000 2001–2004 2005 2006–2007 2008 2009–2012 2013–2016 2017–2022 2023–: Vlaanderen 2002; Vlaanderen–T-Interim; Chocolade Jacques–T-Interim; Chocolade Jacques–Topsport Vlaanderen; Topsport Vlaanderen; Topsport Vlaanderen–Mercator; Topsport Vlaanderen–Baloise; Sport Vlaanderen–Baloise; Team Flanders–Baloise
Team Flanders–Baloise jersey
Jersey

Team Flanders–Baloise (UCI team code: TFB) is a professional cycling team based in Belgium that participates in UCI Continental Circuits races and when selected as a wildcard to UCI World Tour events. The team is managed by Christophe Sercu, with Roger Swerts, Walter Planckaert and Jean-Pierre Heynderickx assisting as a directeur sportif.

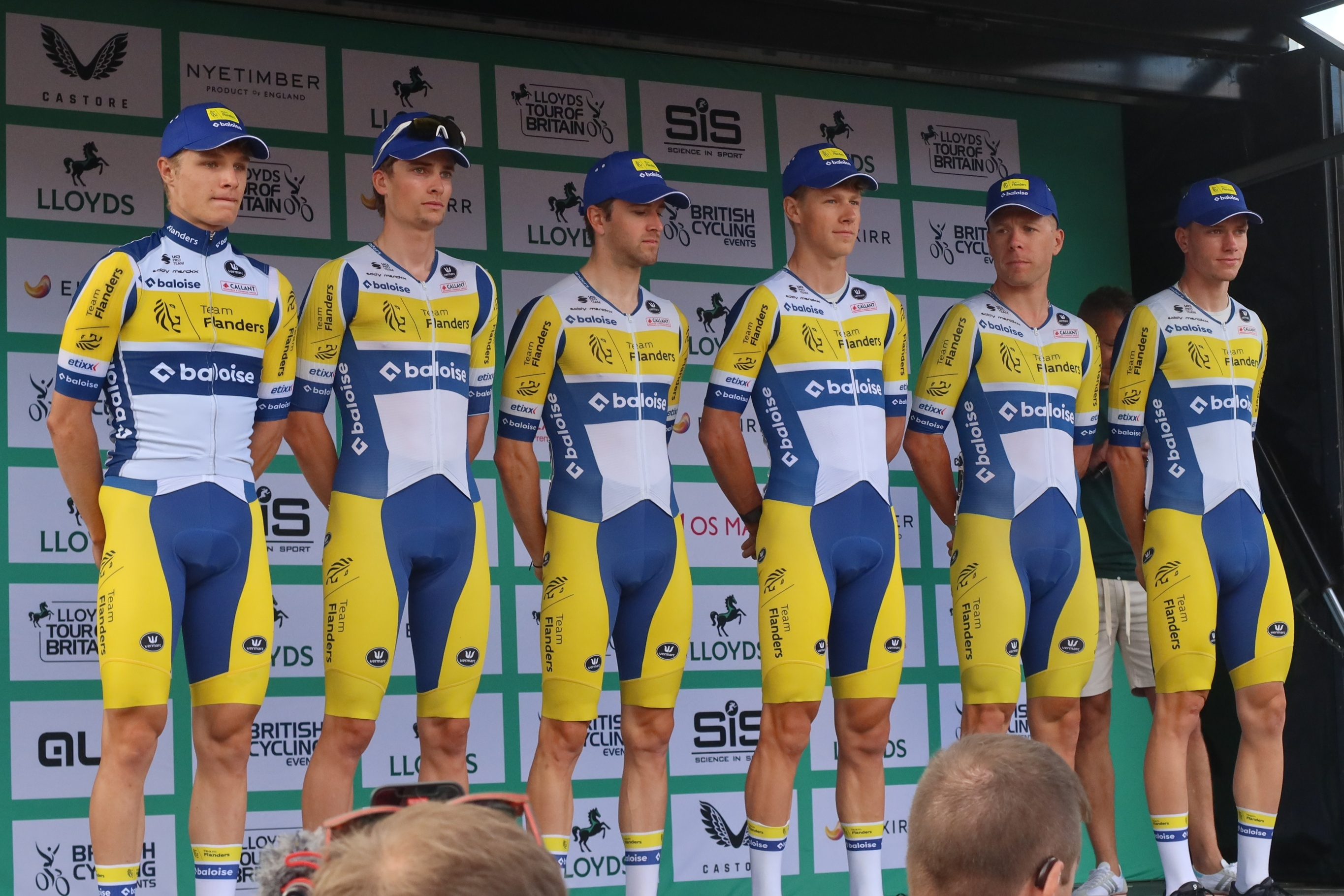
Team Flanders-Baloise at the 2025 Tour of Britain

== Team roster ==
As of 16 August 2026.

Rider	Date of birth
Tom Crabbe (BEL)	2 June 2005 (age 21)
Brem Deman (BEL)	16 May 2002 (age 24)
Tuur Dens (BEL)	26 June 2000 (age 26)
Siebe Deweirdt (BEL)	8 May 2002 (age 24)
Ferre Geeraerts (BEL)	11 January 2003 (age 23)
Jules Hesters (BEL)	11 November 1998 (age 27)
Nolan Huysmans (BEL)	7 January 2006 (age 20)
Michiel Lambrecht (BEL)	10 February 2003 (age 23)
Milan Lanhove (BEL)	1 November 2003 (age 22)
Elias Maris (BEL)	5 October 1999 (age 26)

Rider	Date of birth
Senne Thonnon (BEL)	19 March 2003 (age 23)
Artuur Torney (BEL)	1 September 2003 (age 23)
Milan Van den Haute (BEL)	14 October 2005 (age 20)
Leander Van Hautegem (BEL)	9 March 2003 (age 23)
Vincent Van Hemelen (BEL)	2 November 2000 (age 25)
Henri Vandenabeele (BEL)	15 April 2000 (age 26)
Noah Vandenbranden (BEL)	29 July 2002 (age 24)
Dylan Vandenstorme (BEL)	19 April 2002 (age 24)
Ward Vanhoof (BEL)	18 April 1999 (age 27)
Victor Vercouillie (BEL)	3 November 2002 (age 23)

== National champions ==
2006
Belgium Road Race Championships, Niko Eeckhout
2015
Belgium Road Race Championships, Preben Van Hecke

== Bike sponsor ==
Since 1994, Topsport Vlaanderen and its predecessors are sponsored by Eddy Merckx Cycles. They currently ride with the company's flagship bike, the EMX-525.
