= 2016 E3 Harelbeke =

2016 cycling race in Belgium

2016 UCI World Tour, race 6 of 28
- Actor Wim Opbrouck portrayed on the official poster

Race details
- Dates: 25 March 2016
- Stages: 1
- Distance: 206.4 km (128.3 mi)
- Winning time: 4h 49' 34"

Results
	Winner	Michał Kwiatkowski (POL)	(Team Sky)
	Second	Peter Sagan (SVK)	(Tinkoff)
	Third	Ian Stannard (GBR)	(Team Sky)

The 2016 E3 Harelbeke (officially the Record Bank E3 Harelbeke) was a one-day cycling classic that took place on Friday 25 March 2016. It was the 59th edition of the E3 Harelbeke; it was the second one-day race of the 2016 UCI World Tour and the first of the cobbled classics.

The race started and finished in Harelbeke, covering a distance of 206.4 kilometres (128.3 mi). The principal difficulty in the race came from the fifteen climbs of hills in the Flemish Ardennes. These mainly came in the second half of the race. The principal favourites for victory were Peter Sagan (Tinkoff) and Fabian Cancellara (Trek–Segafredo).

The race was won by Michał Kwiatkowski (Team Sky). He formed a breakaway 30 kilometres (19 mi) from the finish with Sagan and, despite hard work from the Etixx–Quick-Step team and from Cancellara, they came to the finish together. Kwiatkowski comfortably won the sprint and Sagan took second place. Kwiatkowski's teammate Ian Stannard won the group sprint for third place, eleven seconds behind.

== Route ==
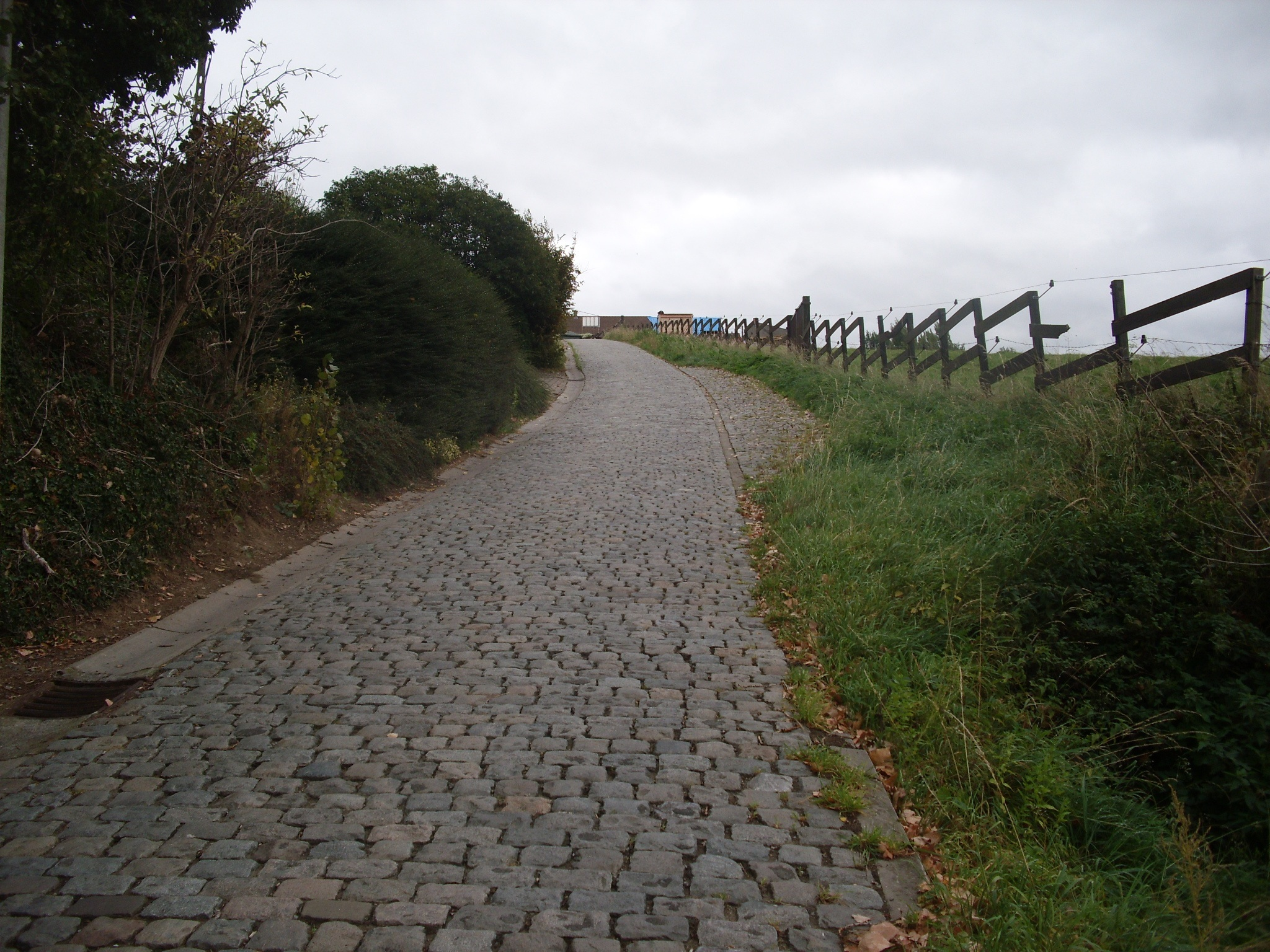
The cobbled climb of the Paterberg, the steepest hill in the race

The E3 Harelbeke starts and finishes in the city of Harelbeke in West Flanders. The principal difficulty in the race comes from the climbs – many of them cobbled – that appear in the 205-kilometre (127 mi) route; many of these climbs also appear in the Tour of Flanders, including the Oude Kwaremont and Paterberg. In 2016, there were several changes to the route from previous years, with a shorter distance and fewer climbs; Cycling Weekly suggested that these could make the race slightly easier than previous editions.

The route left Harelbeke to the southeast, crossing the Scheldt river at Kluisbergen and proceeding through the outskirts of Oudenaarde. The first climb was the Katteberg after 30 kilometres (19 mi); there was then a flat section of cobbled road – the Paddestraat – before the roads turned to the east. The route passed to the north-east of Zottegem, then further east as far as Ninove with 65 kilometres (40 mi) completed. Here the roads turned back to the west into the Flemish Ardennes. The second climb of the day was La Houppe, which came after 115 kilometres (71 mi); the riders then continued into Ronse, the half-way point of the race, for the cobbled climb of the Oude Kruisberg. There were then seven climbs in the following 35 kilometres (22 mi): the Knokteberg, the Hotondberg, the Kortekeer, the Taaienberg (cobbled), the Boigneberg, the Eikenberg (cobbled) and the Stationsberg (cobbled). At this point there were 57 kilometres (35 mi) and five classified climbs remaining.

The next climb, the Kapelberg came 10 kilometres (6.2 mi) later and was immediately followed by the Paterberg, the steepest climb of the day with 700 metres (770 yd) of cobbled road at an average gradient of 12% and sections of 20%. This was then followed after 4 kilometres (2.5 mi) by the partially cobbled, 2.2-kilometre (1.4 mi) climb of the Oude Kwaremont. The penultimate climb of the day was the Karnemelkbeekstraat, 30 kilometres (19 mi) from the finish. At this point, the route crossed back over the Scheldt and returned north-west towards Harelbeke. The final climb, the Tiegemberg, came with 18 kilometres (11 mi) remaining. The last part of the race was flat, with the final 3 kilometres (1.9 mi) a final loop through Harelbeke to the finish line.

Categorized climbs in the 2016 E3 Harelbeke
Number	Name	Distance from finish (km)	Road surface	Length (m)	Average gradient (%)	Maximum gradient (%)
1	Katteberg	176	asphalt	600	6.7%	8%
2	La Houppe	112	asphalt	3440	3.3%	10%
3	Oude Kruisberg	98	cobbles	800	4.8%	9%
4	Knokteberg	89	asphalt	1530	5.3%	13.3%
5	Hotondberg	86	asphalt	1200	4%	8%
6	Kortekeer	79	asphalt	1000	6.4%	17%
7	Taaienberg	74	cobbles	650	9.5%	18%
8	Boigneberg	66	asphalt	2180	5.8%	15%
9	Eikenberg	63	cobbles	1200	5.5%	11%
10	Stationsberg	58	cobbles	460	3.2%	5.7%
11	Kapelberg	47	asphalt	900	4%	7%
12	Paterberg	42	cobbles	700	12%	20%
13	Oude Kwaremont	37	asphalt/cobbles	2200	4.2%	11%
14	Karnemelkbeekstraat	31	asphalt	1530	4.9%	7.3%
15	Tiegemberg	19	asphalt	1000	6.5%	9%

== Participating teams ==
There were 25 teams selected to start the race. All 18 UCI WorldTeams were automatically invited; the race organisers also gave wildcard invitations to seven UCI Professional Continental teams. These included two Belgian teams (Wanty–Groupe Gobert and Topsport Vlaanderen–Baloise), two French teams (Fortuneo–Vital Concept and Direct Énergie), an Italian team (Southeast–Venezuela), a Dutch team (Roompot–Oranje Peloton) and a German team (Bora–Argon 18). Each team was permitted to enter eight riders. Orica–GreenEDGE and Team Dimension Data each entered seven riders and BMC Racing Team's Greg Van Avermaet withdrew through illness, so 197 riders started the race.

UCI WorldTeams

- AG2R La Mondiale
- Astana
- BMC Racing Team
- Team Dimension Data
- Etixx–Quick-Step
- FDJ
- IAM Cycling
- Lampre–Merida
- Lotto–Soudal
- Movistar Team
- Team Giant–Alpecin
- Team Katusha
- LottoNL–Jumbo
- Team Sky
- Tinkoff
- Trek–Segafredo
- Cannondale
- Orica–GreenEDGE

UCI Professional Continental teams

- Bora–Argon 18
- Direct Énergie
- Fortuneo–Vital Concept
- Roompot–Oranje Peloton
- Topsport Vlaanderen–Baloise
- Wanty–Groupe Gobert
- Southeast–Venezuela

== Pre-race favourites ==
The 2015 champion, Team Sky's Geraint Thomas, was not present to defend his title; he was riding the 2016 Volta a Catalunya instead. Peter Sagan (Tinkoff), who won the 2014 race, did start, as did Fabian Cancellara (Trek–Segafredo), who had won the race on three occasions in the past, and Tom Boonen (Etixx–Quick-Step), who held the record for the most victories with five. Cancellara was riding the race for the final time, having announced that the 2016 season would be his last as a professional, and was in strong form with victories in the Strade Bianche and a time-trial stage of the 2016 Tirreno–Adriatico. Sagan, the reigning world champion, had also been performing strongly, but did not have any victories so far in 2016. Boonen had not demonstrated any strong form.

Although Boonen had not shown strong form, he came to the race with a strong team. His teammates included Niki Terpstra, Zdeněk Štybar, Stijn Vandenbergh and Matteo Trentin, all of whom were possible winners of the race. Despite Thomas's absence, Sky also brought a strong team: they had Ian Stannard, Luke Rowe and the former world champion Michał Kwiatkowski. Other possible victors included Sep Vanmarcke (LottoNL–Jumbo), Alexander Kristoff (Team Katusha), Edvald Boasson Hagen (Dimension Data), Jürgen Roelandts (Lotto–Soudal) and Lars Boom (Astana). Greg Van Avermaet would also have been among the favourites, but he was ruled out of the race due to illness.

== Race summary ==
After 40 kilometres (25 mi) of racing, an eight-man breakaway formed. The riders involved were Bert De Backer (Team Giant–Alpecin), Antoine Demoitié (Wanty–Groupe Gobert), Nico Denz (AG2R La Mondiale), Tony Hurel (Direct Energie), Sjoerd van Ginneken (Roompot–Oranje Peloton), Reto Hollenstein (IAM Cycling), Jay Thomson (Dimension Data), and Wouter Wippert (Cannondale). They extended their lead to five minutes with 55 kilometres (34 mi) completed, but their advantage was reduced to less than four minutes by the efforts of Etixx–Quick-Step in the peloton. It was reduced to less than two minutes by the time the riders reached the Taaienberg with 73 kilometres (45 mi) remaining, as Trek put an effort into bringing the lead group back.

On the Taaienberg, Tiesj Benoot (Lotto–Soudal) led the peloton, with Boonen right behind him. A ten-rider group broke away from the peloton over the climb, with Benoot and Boonen joined by Roelandts, Cancellara, Boom, Vanmarcke, Daniel Oss (BMC) and three other Etixx–Quick-Step riders (Terpstra, Štybar and Trentin). On the next climb, the Boigneberg, Cancellara's rear derailleur failed and it took more than a minute for his team to bring him a replacement bike, putting him a long way behind the other favourites. Shortly afterwards, the breakaway was caught by the chasing group; the combined group was then caught by another group that contained Sagan and Kwiatkowski to create a 20-man lead group, although Štybar soon suffered a puncture and fell out of the group. Cancellara, meanwhile, was in a group led by his teammates Yaroslav Popovych and Markel Irizar around two minutes behind.

By the time the race reached the Paterberg, the gap was around half a minute. On the climb, Cancellara attacked from the chasing group, with Štybar on his wheel; meanwhile, a ten-man group broke away from the leaders. After the Paterberg and the subsequent Oude Kwaremont, Cancellara and Štybar eventually reached this group. On the next hill, the Karnemelkbeekstraat, Sagan and Kwiatkowski attacked; over the next 5 kilometres (3.1 mi) they extended their lead to over 20 seconds. This extended to 30 seconds on the Tiegemberg and reached 36 seconds on the final stretch to Harelbeke. The Etixx–Quick-Step riders were forced to do all the work in the chasing group, as none of the other riders in the group would collaborate with them.

After a long effort from Terpstra, Boonen took up the effort on the front of the chasing group and the gap to Sagan and Kwiatkowski began to reduce. The gap fell to under 11 seconds with 1 kilometre (0.62 mi) remaining, but the leading pair were not caught. After going under the flamme rouge, Kwiatkowski manoeuvred Sagan to the front and surprised him by opening up his sprint with 300 metres (330 yd) remaining. Sagan was unable to respond and Kwiatkowski took the race victory, with Sagan four seconds behind. The chasing group finished 11 seconds behind, with Stannard beating Cancellara in the sprint for third place.

== Results ==
Result (top 10 of 106 finishers)
Rank	Rider	Team	Time
1	Michał Kwiatkowski (POL)	Team Sky	4hr 49' 34"
2	Peter Sagan (SVK)	Tinkoff	+ 4"
3	Ian Stannard (GBR)	Team Sky	+ 11"
4	Fabian Cancellara (SUI)	Trek–Segafredo	+ 11"
5	Jasper Stuyven (BEL)	Trek–Segafredo	+ 11"
6	Lars Boom (NED)	Astana	+ 11"
7	Tiesj Benoot (BEL)	Lotto–Soudal	+ 11"
8	Sep Vanmarcke (BEL)	LottoNL–Jumbo	+ 11"
9	Jempy Drucker (LUX)	BMC Racing Team	+ 11"
10	Daniel Oss (ITA)	BMC Racing Team	+ 11"

== Post-race analysis ==
=== Reactions ===
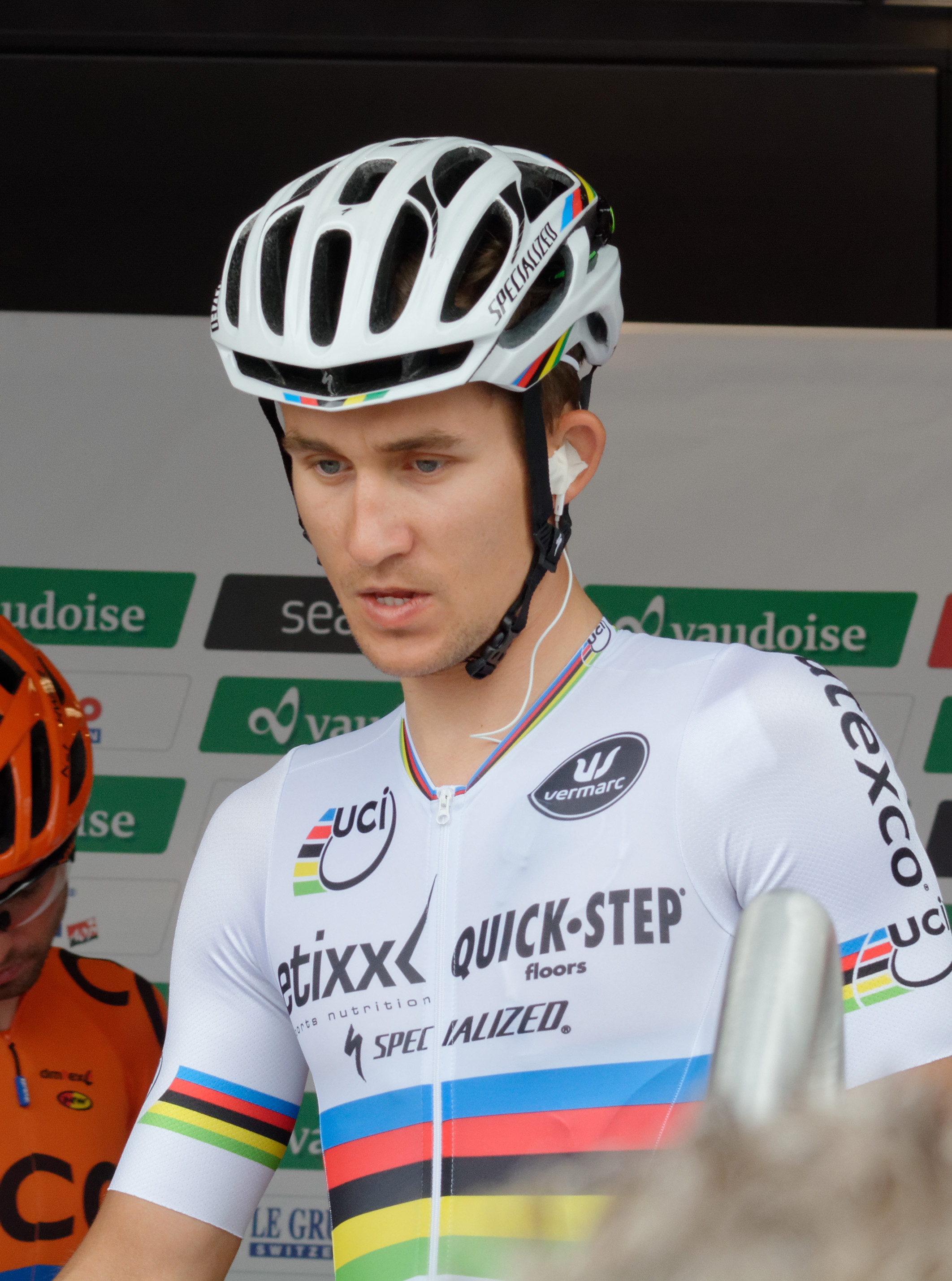
Michał Kwiatkowski (pictured in 2015) won the race.

Kwiatkowski's victory was his first since joining Team Sky at the beginning of 2016. He said after the race that his main target was still the Ardennes classics rather than the remainder of the cobbled classics season, but that there was no reason why he could not succeed in both. He pointed out that he was glad to have escaped with Sagan as they worked well together – they had arrived at the finish of the 2014 Strade Bianche in a similar situation, with Kwiatkowski the winner there as well. He said that he thought he had surprised Sagan by sprinting first, rather than waiting for Sagan's sprint. He also acknowledged that he knew from his own experience a year before that it was "very difficult" to race with the pressure of the world champion's rainbow jersey.

Sagan revealed that he had been told on the radio that he had to ride hard to stay away from the chasing group, but that he had no power left in the final part of the race as he had done the majority of the work in the breakaway. Nevertheless, he said that he was happy with the race. Cancellara, meanwhile, said that, although he was disappointed with the result in itself, he had pride in the way he had performed in coming back from his mechanical failure. After his long pursuit, with the help of several teammates in different groups, he had barely been able to follow the other riders in the group on the Tiegemberg.

=== UCI World Tour standings ===
In the season-long UCI World Tour competition, Kwiatkowski moved into the top ten thanks to the points won in the race. Sagan, meanwhile, moved from seventh to third, just ten points behind the leader, BMC's Richie Porte. Poland moved into the top ten of the nations' rankings, while Sky remained top in the teams' rankings.

UCI World Tour standings on 25 March 2016
Rank	Rider	Team	Points
1	Richie Porte (AUS)	BMC Racing Team	159
2	Greg Van Avermaet (BEL)	BMC Racing Team	156
3	Peter Sagan (SVK)	Tinkoff	149
4	Sergio Henao (COL)	Team Sky	115
5	Simon Gerrans (AUS)	Orica–GreenEDGE	112
6	Sep Vanmarcke (BEL)	LottoNL–Jumbo	141
7	Geraint Thomas (GBR)	Team Sky	104
8	Michał Kwiatkowski (POL)	Team Sky	102
9	Ben Swift (GBR)	Team Sky	88
10	Alberto Contador (ESP)	Tinkoff	86
