= Sep Vanmarcke =

Belgian racing cyclist

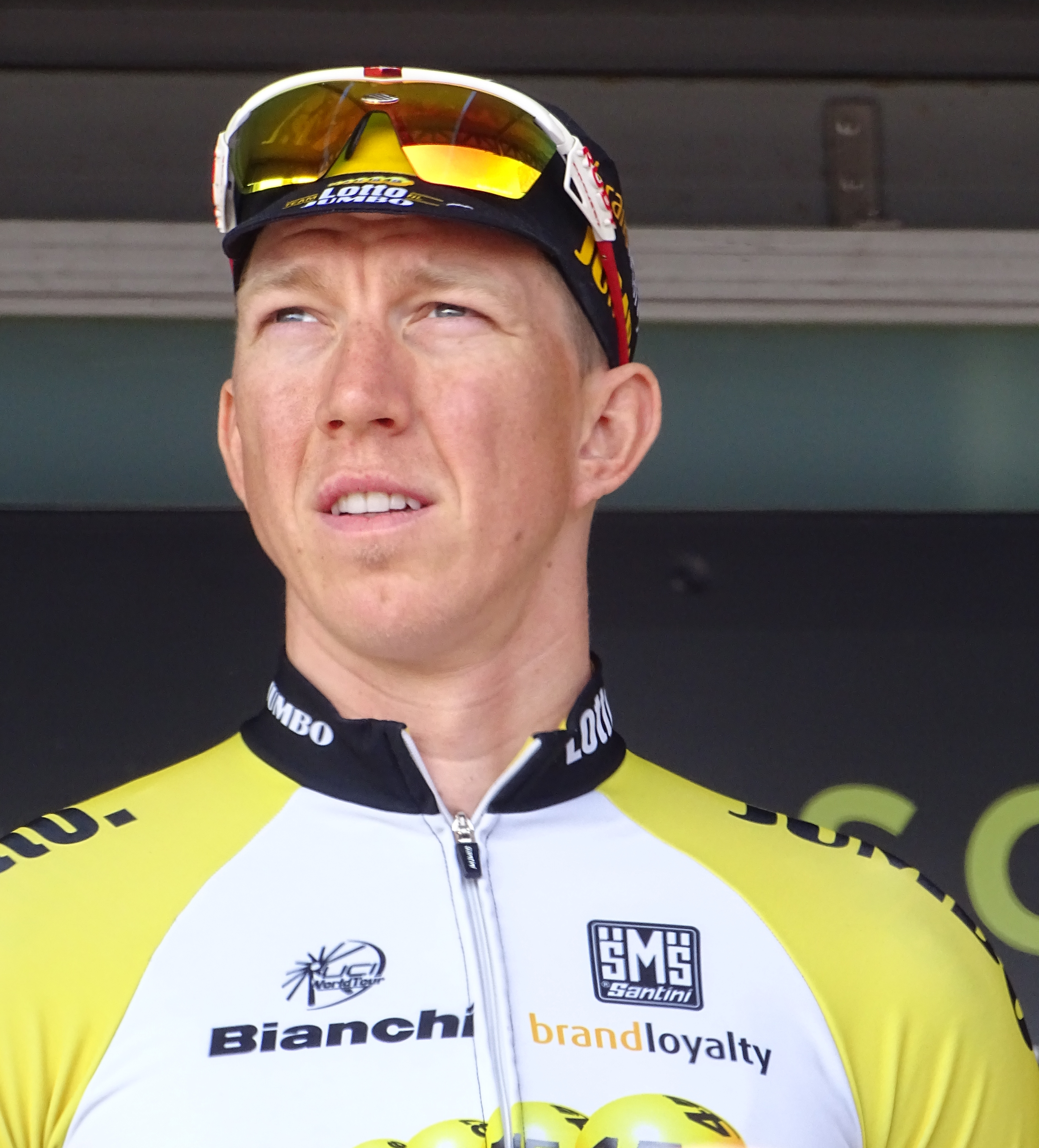
- Vanmarcke in 2015

Personal information
- Full name: Sep Vanmarcke
- Born: 28 July 1988 (age 38) Kortrijk, Flanders, Belgium
- Height: 1.90 m (6 ft 3 in)
- Weight: 77 kg (170 lb; 12 st 2 lb)

Cycling career
- Sport: Cycling
- Current team: NSN Cycling Team
- Discipline: Road
- Role: Rider (retired); Directeur sportif
- Rider type: Classics specialist

Professional teams
- 2008–2009: Davitamon–Lotto–Jong Vlaanderen
- 2009–2010: Topsport Vlaanderen–Mercator
- 2011–2012: Garmin–Cervélo
- 2013–2016: Blanco Pro Cycling
- 2017–2020: Cannondale–Drapac
- 2021–2023: Israel Start-Up Nation

Managerial team
- 2024–: Israel–Premier Tech (directeur sportif)

Major wins
- Stage races Ster ZLM Toer (2016) One-day races and Classics Omloop Het Nieuwsblad (2012) Bretagne Classic (2019) Maryland Cycling Classic (2022)

Sep Vanmarcke (born 27 July 1988) is a Belgian former professional road racing cyclist, who rode professionally between 2008 and 2023 for Jong Vlaanderen–Bauknecht, Topsport Vlaanderen–Mercator, LottoNL–Jumbo, EF Pro Cycling (over two spells), and Israel–Premier Tech, before being forced to retire from the sport for medical reasons. During his professional career, Vanmarcke took nine victories, including the 2012 Omloop Het Nieuwsblad, the 2019 Bretagne Classic Ouest-France and the 2022 Maryland Cycling Classic one-day races.

Following his retirement, Vanmarcke moved into a directeur sportif role with his final professional team, NSN Cycling Team.

== Career ==
Vanmarcke was born in Kortrijk, and started his career at Davitamon–Lotto–Jong Vlaanderen in 2008. He finished on the podium at the Kattekoers in consecutive years, finishing second in 2008 – behind his brother Ken – and third in 2009, and he also won a stage of the 2009 Tour du Haut-Anjou.

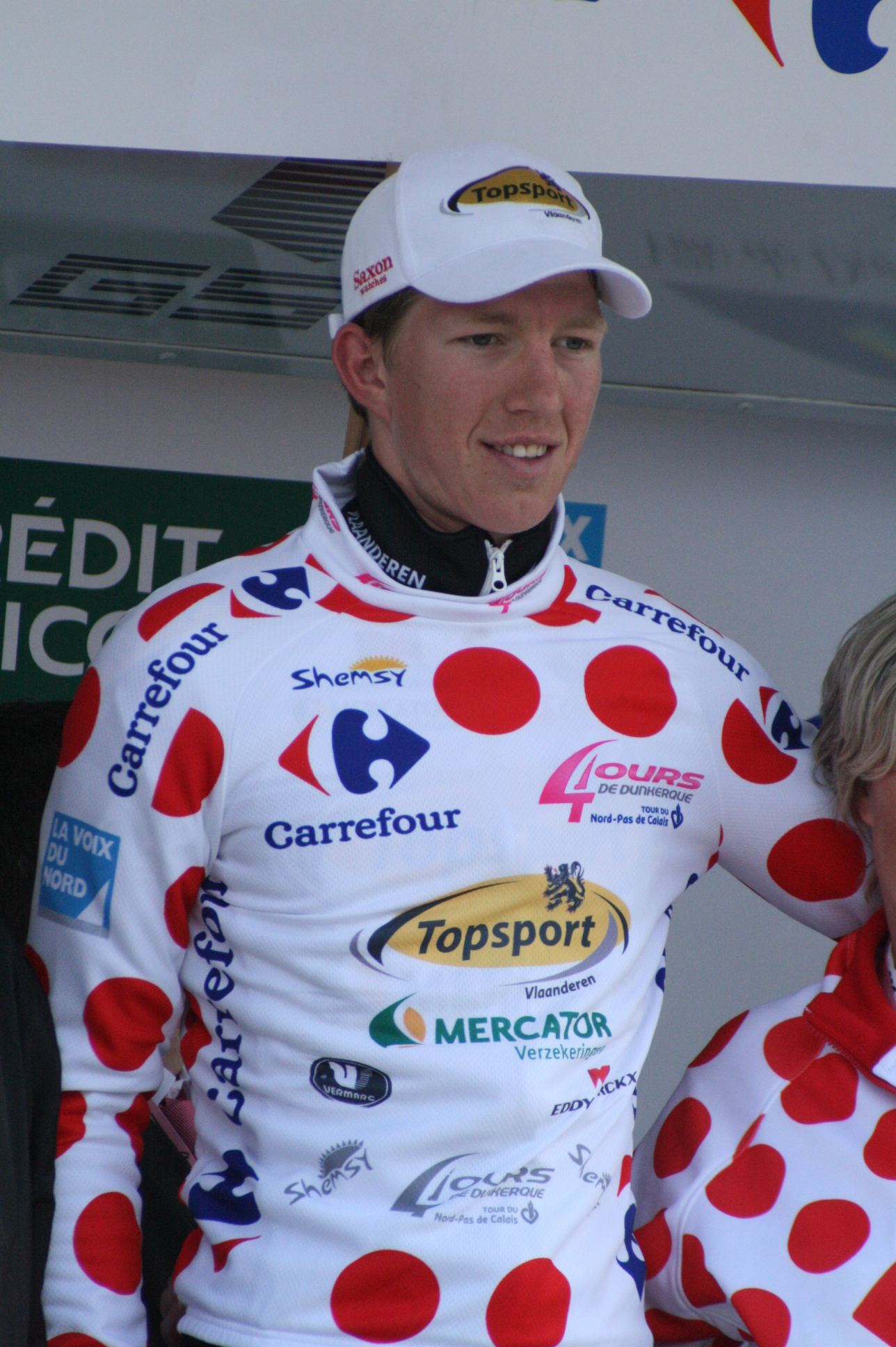
Vanmarcke won the mountains classification at the 2010 Four Days of Dunkirk

Vanmarcke moved to Topsport Vlaanderen–Mercator midway through the 2009 season, recording top-ten finishes at the Sparkassen Giro Bochum – eighth on his début with the team – and the Kampioenschap van Vlaanderen (sixth). In 2010, Vanmarcke won the mountains classification at the Four Days of Dunkirk, and recorded second-place finishes at Gent–Wevelgem, and the Circuit Franco-Belge.

=== Garmin–Cervélo (2011–2012) ===
Having moved to Garmin–Cervélo for the 2011 season, Vanmarcke took the biggest win of his career to that point at the 2012 Omloop Het Nieuwsblad, attacking fiercely twice. The first attack came on the Molenberg climb with 37 kilometres (23 miles) remaining, thinning the field, and he attacked again on the 'Lange Munte' cobbled section to reduce the lead group to only two competitors, Juan Antonio Flecha (Team Sky) and Tom Boonen (Omega Pharma–Quick-Step); he outsprinted them to claim the victory. Also in the first half of the year, Vanmarcke recorded further top-ten finishes at Dwars door Vlaanderen (seventh), E3 Harelbeke (fifth), and the Rogaland GP (third).

=== Blanco Pro Cycling (2013–2016) ===
In August 2012, Vanmarcke announced his departure from Garmin–Sharp, Having been linked with both Lotto–Belisol and RadioShack–Nissan during the season, Vanmarcke joined the former Rabobank team in October 2012, which was later renamed as Blanco Pro Cycling.

==== 2013 ====
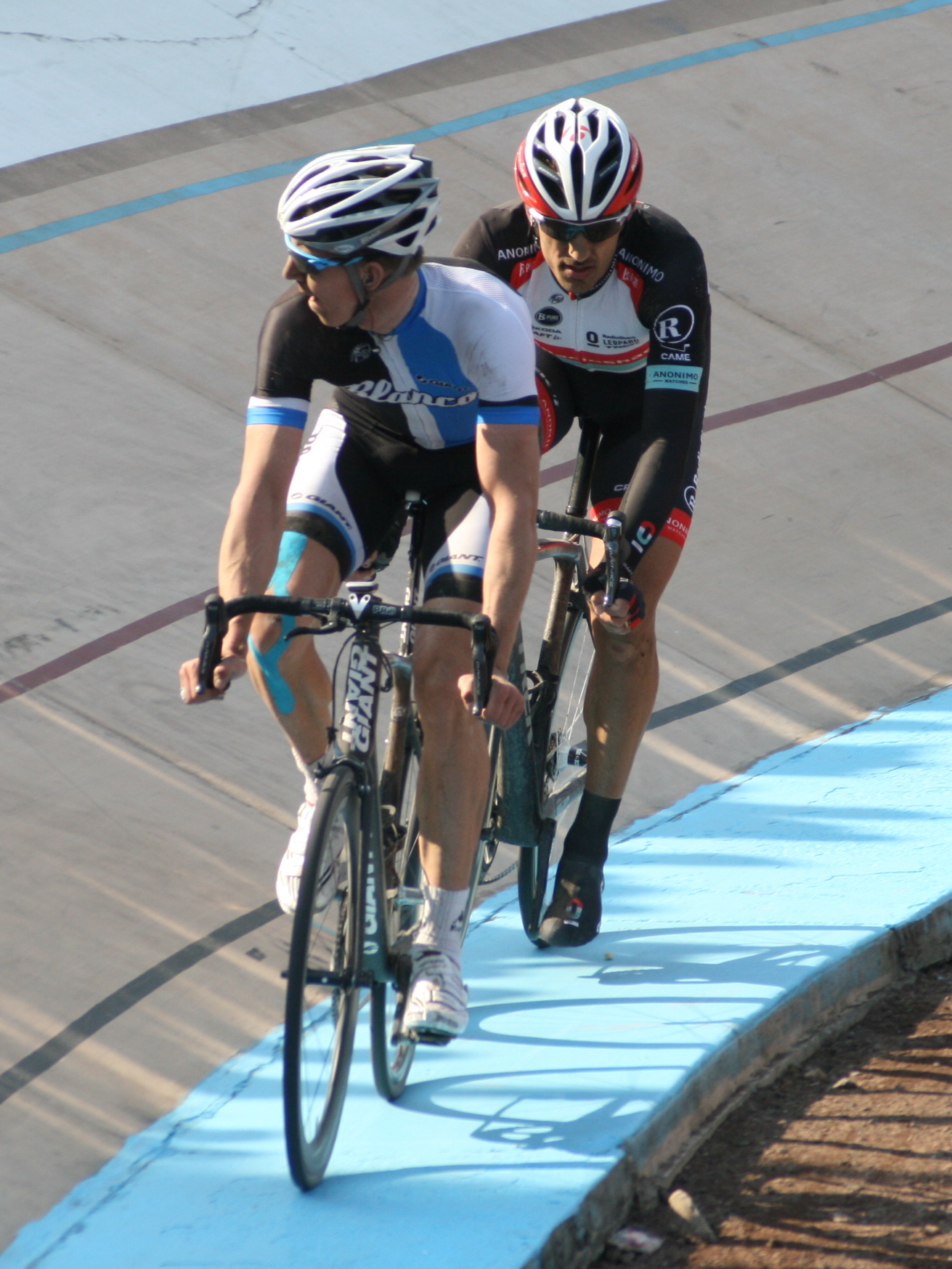
Vanmarcke leading Fabian Cancellara in the climax of the 2013 Paris–Roubaix. Cancellara out-sprinted Vanmarcke for the victory at the Roubaix Velodrome.

In the first part of 2013, Vanmarcke put his focus on the Classics, but he injured his knee in a crash at Tirreno–Adriatico, which effected his preparation for the first important one-day races of the season. He nonetheless participated in the Tour of Flanders, finishing 3 minutes in arrears of race winner Fabian Cancellara. A week later, he finished second to Cancellara in Paris–Roubaix; having escaped with Stijn Vandenbergh with around 30 kilometres (19 miles) remaining, they were joined later on by Cancellara and Zdeněk Štybar. On the Carrefour de l'Arbre cobbled section, Štybar and Vandenbergh were dispatched one-by-one as they collided with spectators. Vanmarcke lost the 2-man sprint contested at the Roubaix Velodrome and was emotional afterwards, since he had come so close to victory. Vanmarcke took his first win for the team at September's Grand Prix Impanis-Van Petegem, beating Pieter Weening in a two-up finish in Haacht; the week prior, Vanmarcke had lost out to Bert De Backer in a three-up finish at the Grote Prijs Jef Scherens in Leuven.

==== 2014 ====
Vanmarcke placed highly in the 2014 season-opening Belgian cycling races with fourth place in Omloop Het Nieuwsblad and third in Kuurne–Brussels–Kuurne the following day, before further top-five finishes in E3 Harelbeke (fifth) and Gent–Wevelgem (fourth). In the Tour of Flanders, Vanmarcke was the only rider able to follow Fabian Cancellara's attack on the final climb of the Oude Kwaremont. The pair caught up with the two earlier escapees, Stijn Vandenbergh and Greg Van Avermaet, and the race came down to a sprint between the four, with Cancellara taking the win ahead of Van Avermaet and Vanmarcke. The following weekend, Vanmarcke was again amongst the lead group at Paris–Roubaix, finishing fourth behind solo winner Niki Terpstra. Later in the season, he added stage victories at the Tour of Norway and the Tour of Alberta, finishing ninth overall at the latter race.

==== 2015–2016 ====
Vanmarcke failed to score a top-ten finish at any of the cycling monuments in the 2015 season but placed highly at February's Omloop Het Nieuwsblad – finishing fifth despite two punctures – and the March races Strade Bianche (fourth), E3 Harelbeke (fifth), and Gent–Wevelgem (sixth). He took further fourth-place finishes later in the season, at both the RideLondon–Surrey Classic and the Tour du Poitou-Charentes.

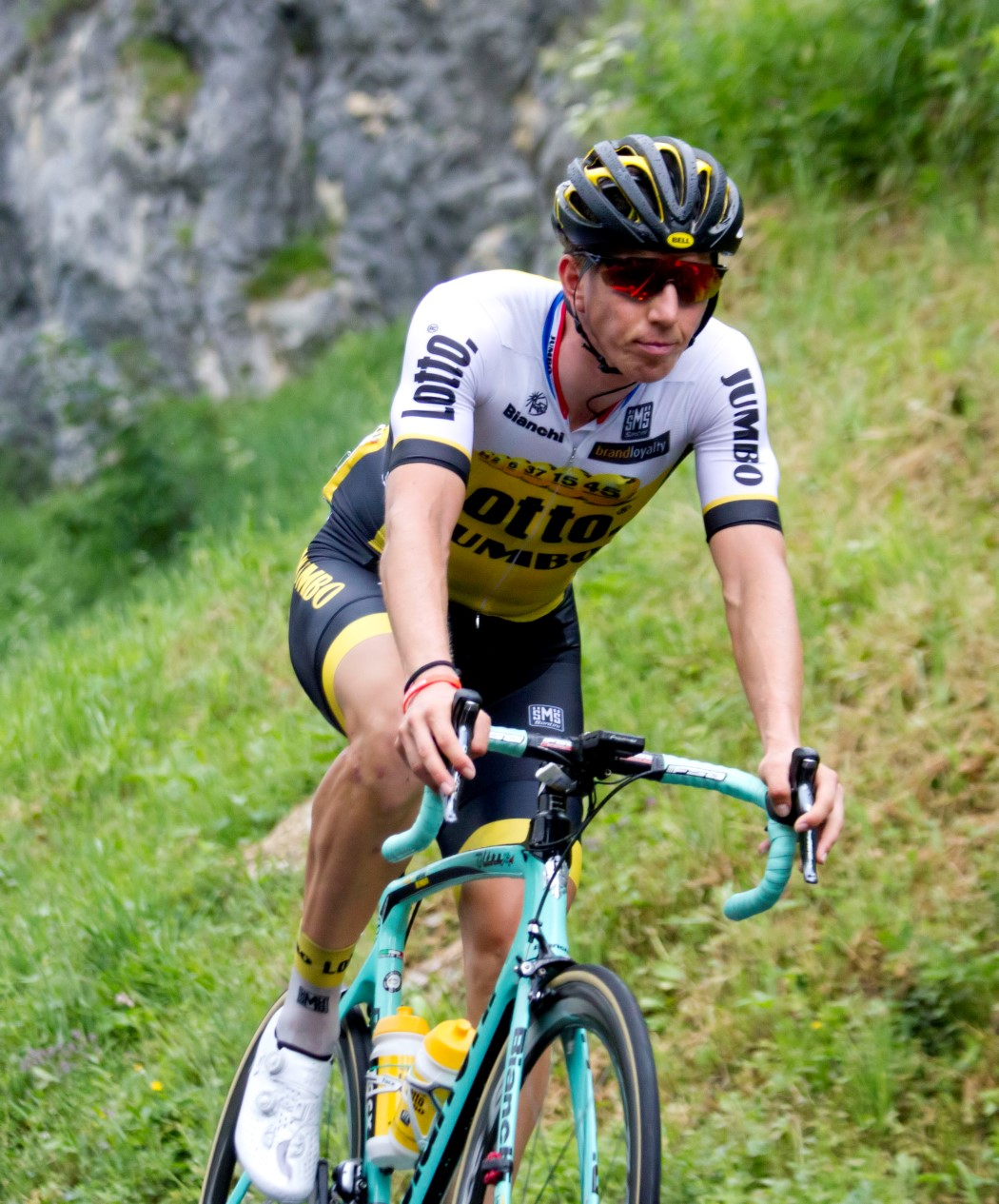
Vanmarcke at the 2016 Tour de France

Having finished eighth at the 2016 E3 Harelbeke, Vanmarcke took a runner-up finish at Gent–Wevelgem for the second time in his career; he attacked with Peter Sagan and Fabian Cancellara on the Kemmelberg, and having caught the leader Vyacheslav Kuznetsov, the quartet contested the honours in a sprint finish – Sagan and Vanmarcke ultimately got the better of Kuznetsov, with Vanmarcke being "pleased" with his result. Over the following two weekends, Vanmarcke finished third at the Tour of Flanders – being beaten by Sagan and Cancellara, after suffering from cramps on the Paterberg – and fourth at Paris–Roubaix, having featured in the race-defining breaks at both races. He later won June's Ster ZLM Toer for his first stage race victory; he won the penultimate stage of the race into La Gileppe in a two-up sprint against Wout van Aert to take the race lead, and ultimately won the race by six seconds ahead of Sean De Bie.

=== Cannondale–Drapac (2017–2020) ===
In August 2016, it was announced that Vanmarcke was to rejoin Cannondale–Drapac on an initial two-year contract from the 2017 season, having rode for the team in 2011 and 2012 when it was known as Garmin–Cervélo. Having started his 2017 season in Iberia with appearances at the Volta a la Comunitat Valenciana – where he crashed twice – and the Volta ao Algarve, Vanmarcke finished third at Omloop Het Nieuwsblad, losing out in a sprint finish against Greg Van Avermaet and Peter Sagan, having forced the lead move on the final ascent of the Molenberg climb. He then endured crashes at both Strade Bianche and the Tour of Flanders, suffering a broken finger at the latter. During the summer, Vanmarcke finished second to Oliver Naesen at the Belgian National Road Race Championships, won the points classification at the Tour of Austria – while also leading the race overall for three days – and finished fourth at the RideLondon–Surrey Classic. Later in the season, he finished fourth at the Bretagne Classic Ouest-France, and took top-ten finishes in both Laurentian classics, with eighth in the Grand Prix Cycliste de Québec and tenth in the Grand Prix Cycliste de Montréal.

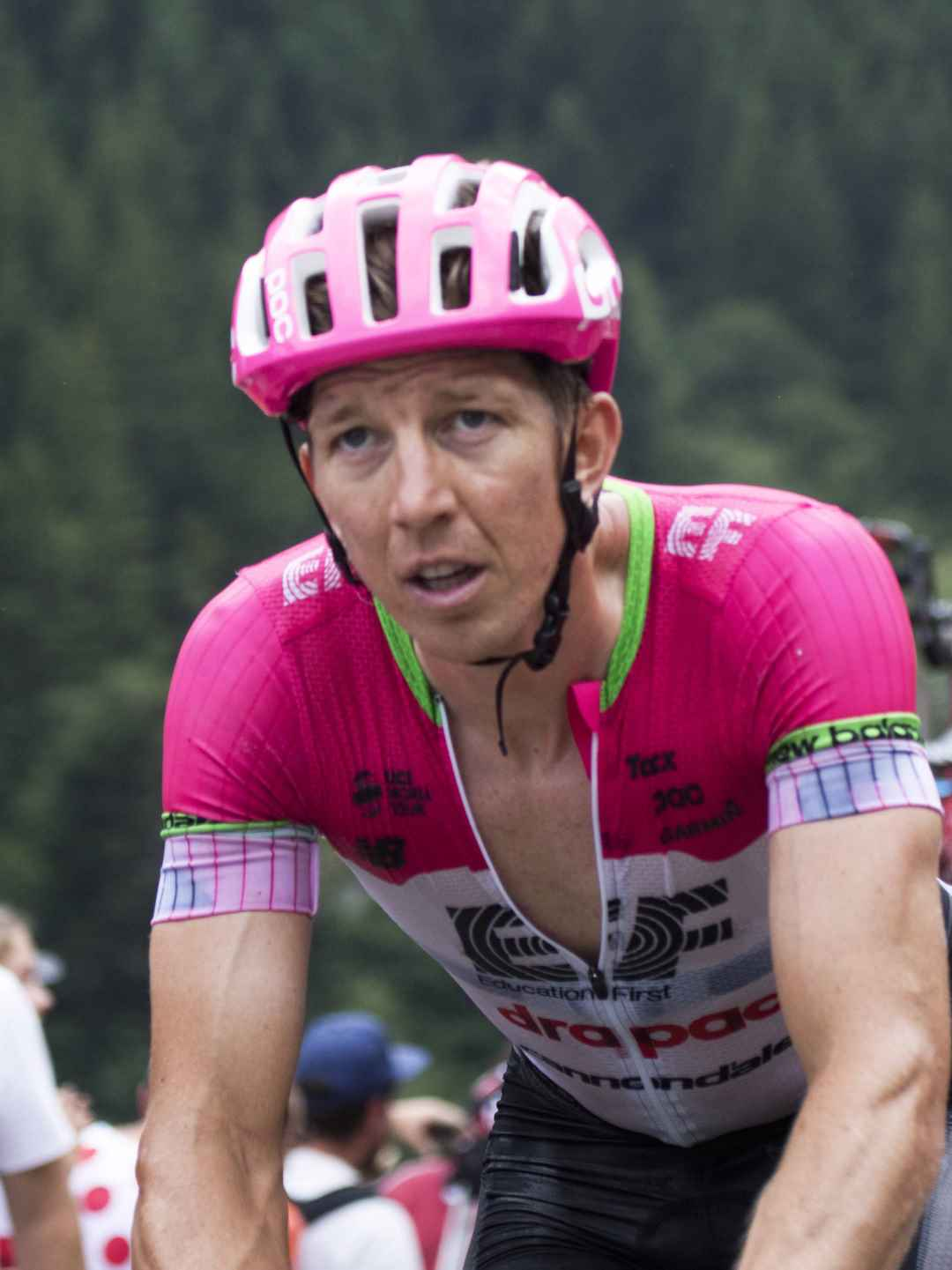
Vanmarcke at the 2018 Tour de France

Just as was the case in 2017, Vanmarcke's first podium of the 2018 season came with a third-place finish at Omloop Het Nieuwsblad; he had been part of a small group in the closing kilometres, unsuccessfully tried to chase down the race-winning solo attack by Michael Valgren, and was out-sprinted for second place by Łukasz Wiśniowski. Later in the spring, Vanmarcke finished in seventh place at E3 Harelbeke – despite crashing in the first half of the race – and another third-place finish, coming at a wet Dwars door Vlaanderen. These results led Vanmarcke to believe that he was a contender for the Tour of Flanders, to be held the following weekend; however, he finished outside the top ten due to several crashes and a puncture. In between, he extended his contract with EF Education First–Drapac p/b Cannondale until the end of the 2020 season. Over the remainder of the season, Vanmarcke took only one further top-five result, with a fifth-place finish coming at the Belgian National Road Race Championships in June.

Vanmarcke started the 2019 season with a block of racing in France, finishing fifth overall at the Étoile de Bessèges, before winning the opening stage of the Tour du Haut Var, recording his first victory since 2016. Vanmarcke's best result from the spring classics was a fourth-place finish at Paris–Roubaix, and he did not reach the podium again until his victory at September's Bretagne Classic Ouest-France, where he was part of a lead group – along with Tiesj Benoot and Jack Haig – that formed with 21 kilometres (13 miles) remaining, before Vanmarcke made a solo attack in the final kilometre for his first UCI World Tour victory. He finished his season with two further top-ten finishes at the Trofeo Matteotti (sixth) and the Gran Premio Bruno Beghelli (ninth). The following year, and in a season disrupted by the COVID-19 pandemic, Vanmarcke failed to record any top-ten overall finishes.

=== Israel Start-Up Nation (2021–2023) ===
Despite being offered a new contract by EF Pro Cycling, Vanmarcke elected to leave the team and signed a three-year contract, from 2021, with Israel Start-Up Nation in October 2020.

For the third time in five years, Vanmarcke finished in third place at the 2021 Omloop Het Nieuwsblad in February, losing out in the sprint finish to Davide Ballerini and Jake Stewart. Over the following couple of months, Vanmarcke finished fourth at Le Samyn (again as part of the lead group), and then finished fifth at the Tour of Flanders. In July, Vanmarcke finished second overall to Diego Ulissi at the Settimana Ciclistica Italiana held on Sardinia; he finished third on three of the race's five stages. At the 2022 Tour de la Provence, Vanmarcke finished second on the second stage, only being beaten by Elia Viviani in the group sprint in Saintes-Maries-de-la-Mer. Later in the season, Vanmarcke won the inaugural Maryland Cycling Classic from a group of five riders in Baltimore, his first victory in three years. In 2023, Vanmarcke recorded top-ten finishes at Omloop Het Nieuwsblad (tenth) and the Nokere Koerse (sixth), before a third-place finish at Gent–Wevelgem – where he led home a small group of riders almost two minutes down on the top two in the race, Christophe Laporte and Wout van Aert.

=== Retirement, directeur sportif ===
On 7 July 2023, Vanmarcke announced his retirement from cycling with immediate effect, due to cardiac issues. The following month, Israel–Premier Tech announced that Vanmarcke would join the team's staff as a directeur sportif from the 2024 season.

== Major results ==
2006
4th Road race, National Junior Road Championships
2007
3rd Ronde Van Vlaanderen Beloften
6th Circuit de Wallonie
2008
2nd Kattekoers
6th La Côte Picarde
8th Ronde Van Vlaanderen Beloften
2009
3rd Kattekoers
3rd La Côte Picarde
4th Overall Tour du Haut-Anjou

1st Stage 1

5th Ronde Van Vlaanderen Beloften
6th Kampioenschap van Vlaanderen
8th Sparkassen Giro Bochum
2010
1st Mountains classification, Four Days of Dunkirk
2nd Overall Circuit Franco-Belge
2nd Gent–Wevelgem
3rd Ronde van het Groene Hart
8th Grand Prix de Wallonie
9th Paris–Camembert
2011
4th E3 Prijs Vlaanderen
2012
1st Omloop Het Nieuwsblad
3rd Rogaland GP
5th E3 Harelbeke
7th Dwars door Vlaanderen
2013
1st Grand Prix Impanis-Van Petegem
1st Grote Prijs Wase Polders
2nd Paris–Roubaix
2nd Grote Prijs Jef Scherens
5th Road race, National Road Championships
5th Overall Tour des Fjords
5th Rund um Köln
2014
1st Stage 3 Tour of Norway
3rd Kuurne–Brussels–Kuurne
3rd Tour of Flanders
4th Omloop Het Nieuwsblad
4th Gent–Wevelgem
4th Paris–Roubaix
5th E3 Harelbeke
5th Binche–Chimay–Binche
7th Grand Prix Cycliste de Québec
9th Overall Tour of Alberta

1st Stage 3

2015
4th Overall Tour du Poitou-Charentes
4th Strade Bianche
4th London–Surrey Classic
5th Omloop Het Nieuwsblad
5th E3 Harelbeke
6th Gent–Wevelgem
7th Münsterland Giro
2016
1st Overall Ster ZLM Toer

1st Stage 4

2nd Gent–Wevelgem
3rd Tour of Flanders
4th Paris–Roubaix
5th Time trial, National Road Championships
8th E3 Harelbeke
9th Overall Tour du Poitou Charentes
2017
1st Points classification, Tour of Austria
2nd Road race, National Road Championships
3rd Omloop Het Nieuwsblad
4th Bretagne Classic Ouest-France
4th London–Surrey Classic
8th Grand Prix Cycliste de Québec
10th Grand Prix Cycliste de Montréal
2018
3rd Omloop Het Nieuwsblad
3rd Dwars door Vlaanderen
5th Road race, National Road Championships
6th Paris–Roubaix
7th E3 Harelbeke
7th Paris–Tours
2019
1st Bretagne Classic Ouest-France
1st Stage 1 Tour du Haut Var
4th Paris–Roubaix
5th Overall Étoile de Bessèges
6th Trofeo Matteotti
9th Gran Premio Bruno Beghelli
2021
2nd Overall Settimana Ciclistica Italiana
3rd Omloop Het Nieuwsblad
4th Le Samyn
5th Tour of Flanders
2022
1st Maryland Cycling Classic
8th Grote Prijs Marcel Kint
2023
3rd Gent–Wevelgem
6th Nokere Koerse
10th Omloop Het Nieuwsblad

=== Grand Tour general classification results timeline ===
Grand Tour	2011	2012	2013	2014	2015	2016	2017	2018	2019	2020	2021
Giro d'Italia	Did not contest during his career										
Tour de France	—	—	131	106	104	104	—	115	—	—	—
Vuelta a España	139	—	—	—	—	—	—	—	—	—	DNF

=== Classics results timeline ===
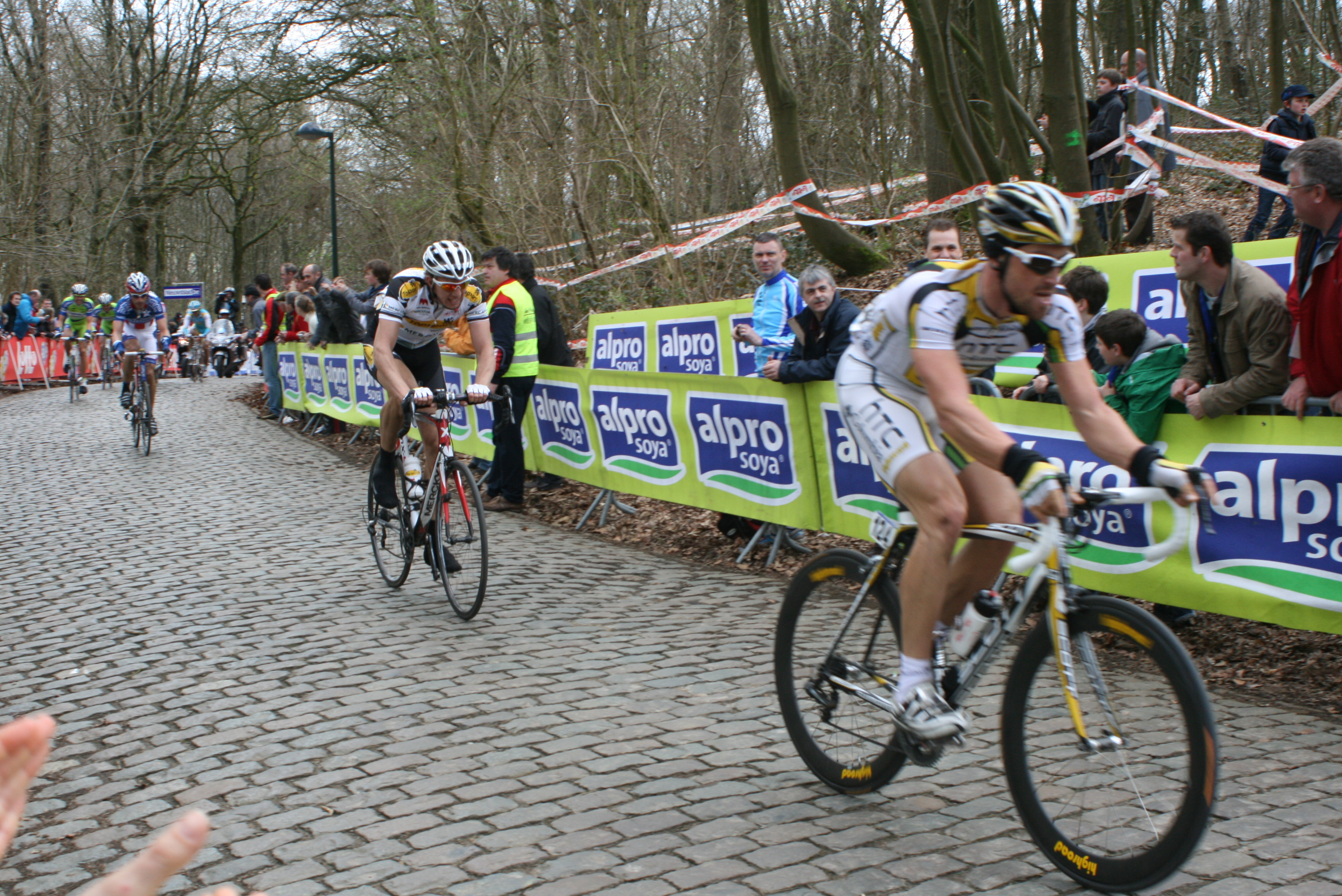
Vanmarcke chasing Bernhard Eisel at the 2010 Gent–Wevelgem; Vanmarcke ultimately finished the race in second, behind Eisel.

Monument	2010	2011	2012	2013	2014	2015	2016	2017	2018	2019	2020	2021	2022	2023
Milan–San Remo	—	—	—	—	—	—	24	—	—	—	—	—	—	46
Tour of Flanders	62	DNF	48	29	3	53	3	DNF	13	25	17	5	—	24
Paris–Roubaix	—	20	84	2	4	11	4	—	6	4	NH	23	—	16
Liège–Bastogne–Liège	Did not contest during his career													
Giro di Lombardia	—	DNF	—	—	—	—	—	61	—	108	—	—	—	—
Classic	2010	2011	2012	2013	2014	2015	2016	2017	2018	2019	2020	2021	2022	2023
Omloop Het Nieuwsblad	34	—	1	74	4	5	—	3	3	92	23	3	DNS	10
Kuurne–Brussels–Kuurne	—	—	—	NH	3	81	—	—	61	—	59	DNF	—	16
Strade Bianche	—	—	—	DNF	—	4	—	DNF	41	—	—	—	—	—
E3 Saxo Bank Classic	—	4	5	51	5	5	8	23	7	DNF	NH	30	DNF	17
Gent–Wevelgem	2	142	—	DNF	4	6	2	—	21	—	17	DNF	77	3
Dwars door Vlaanderen	18	39	7	—	—	—	—	28	3	—	NH	—	101	DNF
Bretagne Classic	—	—	41	DNF	—	40	97	4	39	1	28	—	—	—
Grand Prix Cycliste de Québec	—	—	—	—	7	29	—	8	13	40	Not held		30	—
Grand Prix Cycliste de Montréal	—	—	—	—	16	DNF	—	10	DNF	61	Not held		15	—
Paris–Tours	15	28	—	76	40	DNF	105	—	7	—	—	77	24	—

Legend
—	Did not compete
DNF	Did not finish
DNS	Did not start
NH	Not held
