= 2015 E3 Harelbeke =

Cycling race

2015 UCI World Tour, race 6 of 28
- Reworked poster

Race details
- Dates: 27 March 2015
- Distance: 215.3 km (133.8 mi)
- Winning time: 5h 15' 00"

Results
	Winner	Geraint Thomas (GBR)	(Team Sky)
	Second	Zdeněk Štybar (CZE)	(Etixx–Quick-Step)
	Third	Matteo Trentin (ITA)	(Etixx–Quick-Step)

The 2015 E3 Harelbeke was the 58th edition of the E3 Harelbeke cycling race, which took place on 27 March and was the sixth race of the 2015 UCI World Tour. The defending champion was Peter Sagan (Tinkoff–Saxo), who won the 2014 edition in a four-man sprint. The race, while important in its own right as part of the spring classics season, was seen as an important part of riders' preparation for the 2015 Tour of Flanders, one of the cycling monuments that took place on many of the same roads the following week.

E3 Harelbeke took place on roads in Flanders, starting and ending in the town of Harelbeke. The primary difficulty in the race was the series of short climbs known as hellingen, some of which were cobbled; most of these came in the middle part of the race, with a fairly flat final part.

The key move of the race was made on the Oude Kwaremont by Geraint Thomas (Team Sky), Zdeněk Štybar (Etixx–Quick-Step) and Sagan. The three riders rode together for over 30 kilometres (19 miles), maintaining a gap to the chasing peloton. With approximately 4 kilometres (2.5 miles) remaining, Thomas attacked and was able to take a solo victory, and became the first British rider to win the race. Štybar chased and was able to take second place, but Sagan was caught by the main peloton. Štybar's teammate Matteo Trentin won the bunch sprint for third place.

The other major feature of the race was a succession of crashes. Sep Vanmarcke (LottoNL–Jumbo) slipped on the Paterberg, though this resulted in nothing worse than a broken shoe; however, a major crash early in the race caused significant problems for a number of riders. The worst affected was Fabian Cancellara (Trek Factory Racing), one of the major favourites for victory; he broke two vertebrae, ruling him out of the remainder of the classics season.

== Poster controversy ==
The controversial poster issued before the race

About a month before the race took place, in February 2015, the race organisers published a publicity poster for the race. This poster showed a woman, with her dress raised and underwear with the race logo visible. A cyclist's gloved hand was reaching out apparently to pinch the woman's bottom. The poster bore the caption Wie knijpt ze in Harelbeke? (English: Who squeezes them in Harelbeke?). This was a reference to Peter Sagan's actions after the 2013 Tour of Flanders, when he pinched the bottom of Maja Leye during the podium ceremony after the race.

The poster caused significant controversy, especially as the 2011 race had also featured a poster viewed as sexist. The 2015 poster was described as "demeaning" and "misogynistic". The poster was criticised by the Union Cycliste Internationale (UCI) and by the Belgian Jury of Advertising Ethics. In March, a few weeks before the race was held, the poster was withdrawn and replaced.

== Route ==
The 2015 edition of E3 Harelbeke was 215.3 kilometres (133.8 miles) in length. It started in the Belgian municipality of Harelbeke, where there was a 2.8-kilometre (1.7-mile) neutral zone before the official start. Initially, the route headed north, but after a short distance it turned south-east to reach the town of Avelgem after 12.8 kilometres (8.0 miles). The route then turned north-east through Oudenaarde and reached the first climb, the Katteberg, after 32 kilometres (20 miles). The route briefly went south-east again to reach the second climb, the Leberg, 10 kilometres (6.2 miles) later. Between the Katteberg and the Leberg, there were two flat sections of cobbles, the Holleweg and the Haaghoek. The race then entered a long loop without any significant climbs, though it did include the Paddestraat, another flat section of cobbles. This loop first went north-east, reaching Burst after 62.5 kilometres (38.8 miles), then south to Appelterre-Eichem. The loop turned west at this point, travelling through Geraardsbergen after 86 kilometres (53 miles).

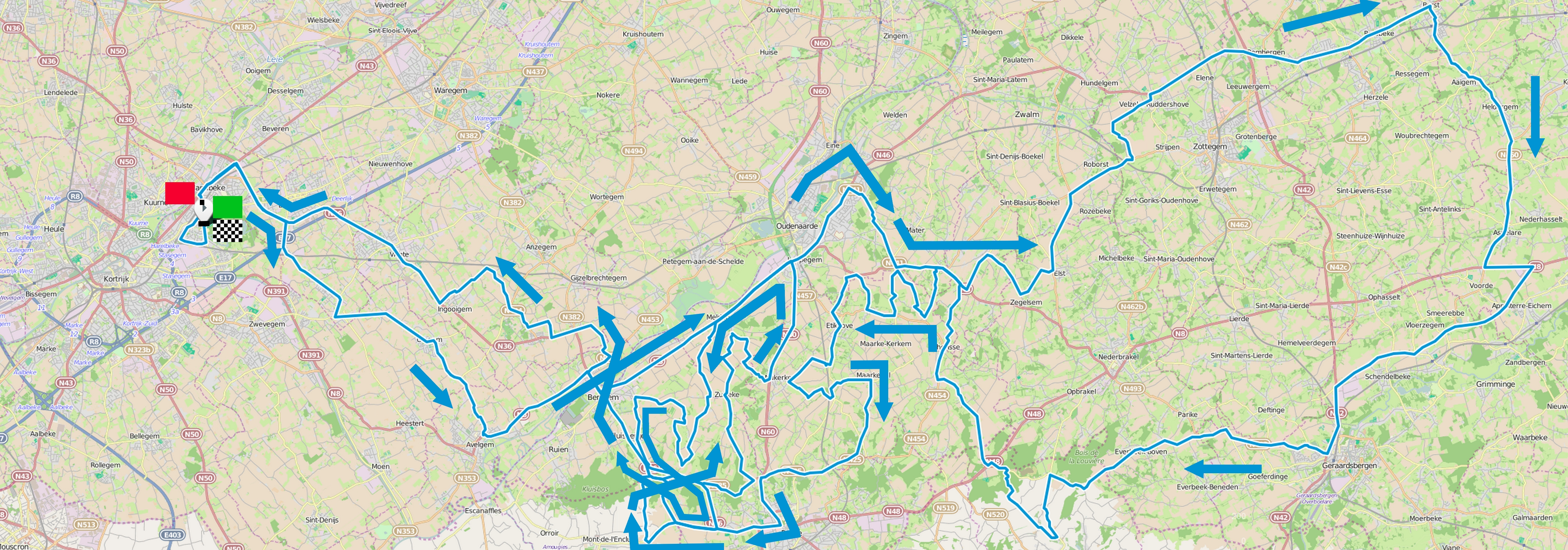
Route of the 2015 E3 Harelbeke

The third climb came after 99.9 kilometres (62.1 miles) at La Houppe. This was the longest climb of the day at 3.4 kilometres (2.1 miles) in length. The course then turned north to reach the Berg Stene climb after 108.5 kilometres (67.4 miles). The next four climbs came in quick succession over the next 18 kilometres (11 miles): the Boigneberg, the Eikenberg (the first of the cobbled climbs), the Stationberg and the Taaienberg. A 15-kilometre (9.3-mile) flat section followed, as the course travelled south-west through Ronse, before a turn to the north to tackle the next climb. This was the Knokteberg, which came after 142.6 kilometres (88.6 miles), and it was followed by another turn to the east and the climb of the Hotondberg after 146.6 kilometres (91.1 miles). The Rotelenberg (after 155 kilometres (96 miles)) and the Kortekeer (after 156.6 kilometres (97.3 miles)) were the next two climbs as the route again approached Oudenaarde.

After turning south at Leupegem, there were 53 kilometres (33 miles) remaining. With 46.2 kilometres (28.7 miles) remaining, the riders climbed the Kapelberg. The next section was expected to be the key part of the race: the climbs of the Paterberg and the Oude Kwaremont. The Oude Kwaremont was the final cobbled climb of the day; at the top of the climb there were 37.7 kilometres (23.4 miles) left to the end of the race. In past editions of the race this was the section where a decisive breakaway was formed; the combination of the two climbs was also a major feature of the Tour of Flanders.

The route continued south to the penultimate climb of the day, the Karnemelkbeekstraat, with 29.7 kilometres (18.5 miles) remaining, then turned north-west for the final part of the race. This section was mostly flat; the only climb was the Tiegemberg with 18.7 kilometres (11.6 miles) to the finish line. It was expected that riders dropped in the hilly section of the course would try to regain contact on this section. The route continued west and finished where it had started in Harelbeke.

== Teams ==
As E3 Harelbeke was a UCI World Tour event, all 17 UCI WorldTeams were invited automatically and were obliged to send a squad. Seven Professional Continental teams received wildcard invitations.

UCI WorldTeams

- AG2R La Mondiale
- Astana
- BMC Racing Team
- Etixx–Quick-Step
- FDJ
- IAM Cycling
- Lampre–Merida
- Lotto–Soudal
- Movistar Team
- Orica–GreenEDGE
- Cannondale–Garmin
- Team Giant–Alpecin
- Team Katusha
- LottoNL–Jumbo
- Team Sky
- Tinkoff–Saxo
- Trek Factory Racing

UCI Professional Continental teams

- Topsport Vlaanderen–Baloise
- Wanty–Groupe Gobert
- Team Europcar
- MTN–Qhubeka
- Team Roompot
- Southeast Pro Cycling
- Androni Giocattoli

== Pre-race favourites ==
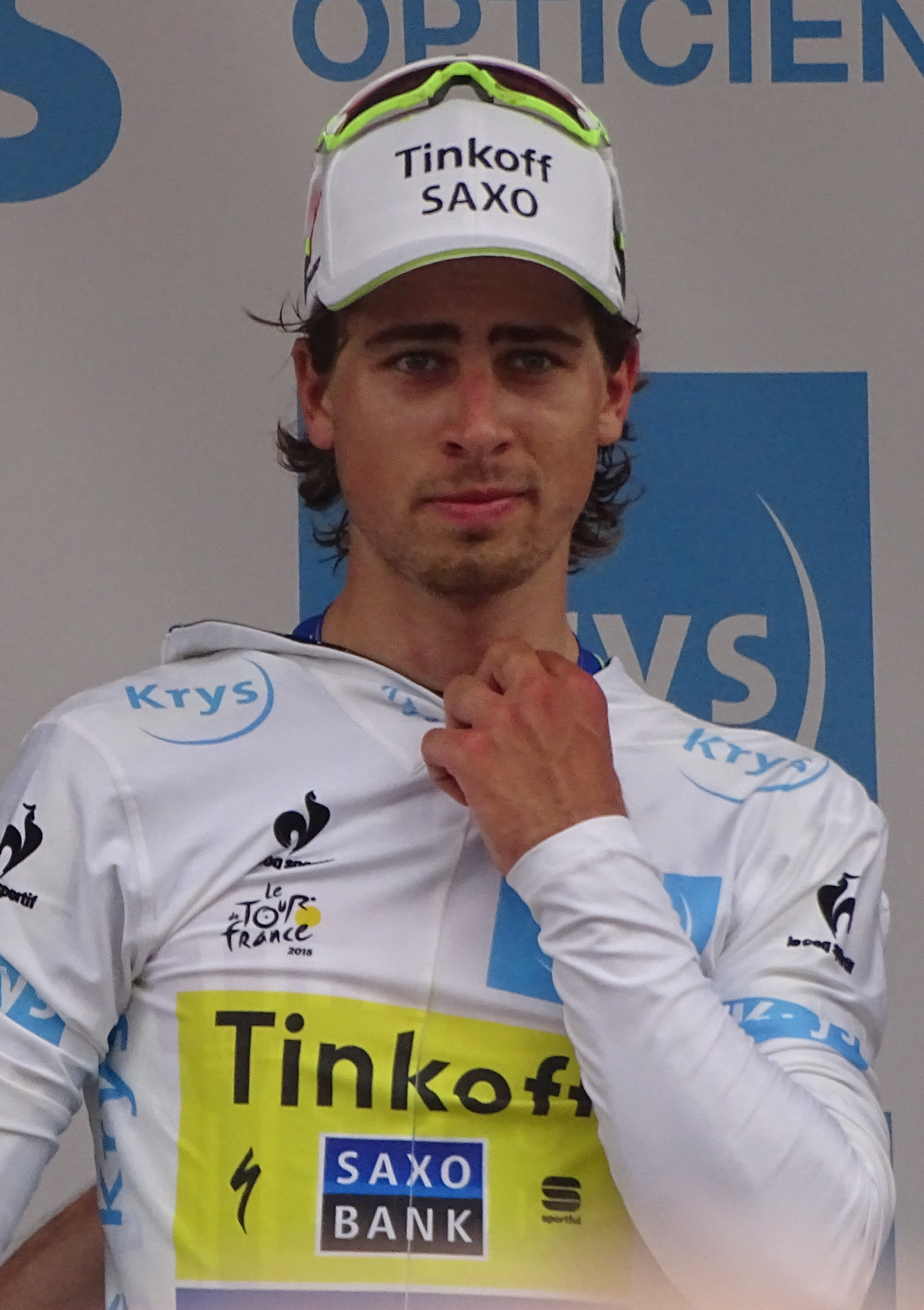
Tinkoff–Saxo's Peter Sagan (pictured at the 2015 Tour de France) was a leading contender to win the race.

E3 Harelbeke was part of the spring classics season. It was therefore suited to the riders who rode in the several other similar races through the early part of the season, such as Omloop Het Nieuwsblad, the Tour of Flanders and Dwars door Vlaanderen, which were often raced over the same roads.

The winner of the 2014 E3 Harelbeke, Peter Sagan (Tinkoff–Saxo) was one of the major pre-race favourites, although his early-season form had been mixed and he had won just one race in 2015 to that point. The team's preparation for the race was also affected by the suspension of the team manager, Bjarne Riis, by the owner Oleg Tinkov, following the team's poor results.

The other principal favourite was Fabian Cancellara (Trek Factory Racing), who won the race in 2010, 2011 and 2013. Although he too had had a relatively unsuccessful Milan–San Remo, finishing seventh, he had shown good form in other races in the season. However, one of his most important teammates, Stijn Devolder, crashed in Dwars door Vlaanderen earlier in the week, potentially affecting Cancellara's chances.

The Etixx–Quick-Step team was also expected to feature in the race. Although Tom Boonen, the leader of the team and a five-time winner of the race, had crashed at Paris–Nice and was absent with injury, the team had several other riders who could compete for the win. These included Niki Terpstra, who was second in 2014, Zdeněk Štybar and Stijn Vandenbergh.

Other favourites included Greg Van Avermaet (BMC Racing Team), Sep Vanmarcke (LottoNL–Jumbo), Alexander Kristoff (Team Katusha), Ian Stannard and Geraint Thomas (both Team Sky). Nairo Quintana (Movistar Team) also entered the race as he had in Dwars door Vlaanderen; he was preparing for cobbled stages at the Tour de France rather than competing for the win.

== Race report ==
=== Early stages ===
The race started without Filippo Pozzato (Lampre–Merida), the 2009 champion, who missed the race due to illness. Shortly after the start, a breakaway was formed by six riders. These were Sjoerd van Ginneken (Team Roompot), Sean De Bie (Lotto–Soudal), Dries Devenyns (IAM Cycling), Sébastien Turgot (AG2R La Mondiale), Kristian Sbaragli (MTN–Qhubeka) and Andrea Dal Col (Southeast Pro Cycling). The first significant event took place on the Haaghoek cobbles after about 40 kilometres (25 miles). A water bottle came loose and caused a large crash in the main peloton. A large number of riders crashed, including Fabian Cancellara (Trek Factory Racing), Sebastian Langeveld (Cannondale–Garmin), Robert Wagner (LottoNL–Jumbo), Lars Boom (Astana) and John Degenkolb (Team Giant–Alpecin). Most of the riders were able to continue, but Cancellara, one of the favourites to win the race, was forced to abandon it in significant pain. It was immediately clear that he would miss Gent–Wevelgem; soon afterwards it was announced that he had two broken vertebrae and would miss the rest of the spring classics season.

Over the next 70 kilometres (43 miles), the breakaway continued to build their lead over the peloton; with 100 kilometres (62 miles) to race, they had a lead of around six minutes, although Dal Col was dropped. Shortly afterwards, the peloton climbed the Taaienberg, where Daniel Oss (BMC Racing Team), Matteo Trentin (Etixx–Quick-Step) and Matti Breschel (Tinkoff–Saxo) attacked and were soon joined by Tiesj Benoot (Lotto–Soudal). This breakaway was soon brought back by Team Katusha. Nairo Quintana was dropped during this period of racing and abandoned the race. Tinkoff–Saxo, along with Team Sky, took up the chase in earnest and reduced the breakaway's lead to under two and a half minutes with 67 kilometres (42 miles) left. BMC Racing Team joined in the chase and halved the lead over the next 20 kilometres (12 miles). Van Ginneken was dropped, leaving three riders in the leading group.

=== Paterberg−Oude Kwaremont ===
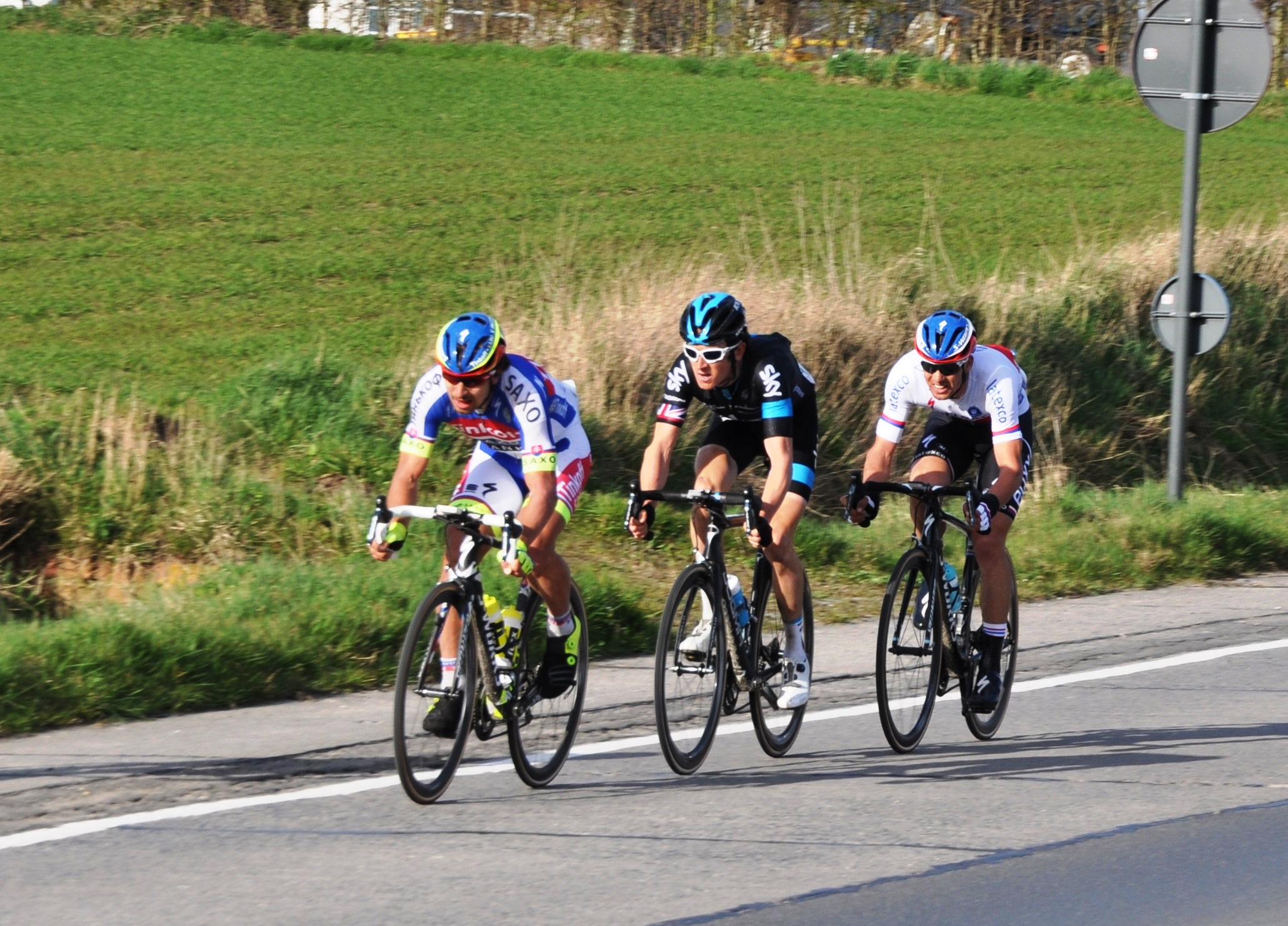
Peter Sagan, Geraint Thomas and Zdeněk Štybar led the race from the Oude Kwaremont climb until Thomas' attack 4 kilometres (2.5 miles) from the finish.

The riders then entered the crucial section of the Paterberg and Oude Kwaremont. Devenyns attacked alone from the breakaway group, while Sep Vanmarcke (LottoNL–Jumbo) attacked the peloton. Vanmarcke was riding the climb in the gutter to one side of the road. He slipped in the mud and had to put a foot down on the cobblestones; this damaged his shoe and left him unable to clip into his pedal, reducing his ability to apply power on the climbs. He continued with the broken shoe over the Paterberg and Oude Kwaremont until he was able to change it on a flat section of road. Vanmarcke was in a small group of riders that earned a gap on the Paterberg, but they were caught soon afterwards. At this point there was a chase group of around 30 riders, half a minute behind Devenyns as they entered the Oude Kwaremont.

Marcus Burghardt (BMC Racing Team) led the peloton on the first part of the climb, until he was attacked by Geraint Thomas (Team Sky), who was followed by Zdeněk Štybar (Etixx–Quick-Step). After a brief period, Peter Sagan (Tinkoff–Saxo) bridged across to Thomas and Štybar; the three riders then caught and dropped Devenyns. The gap between the leading three and the peloton quickly reached 25 seconds, then was reduced to 15 seconds by BMC.

=== Final stages ===
The gap expanded again to 45 seconds at the foot of the final climb, the Tiegemberg; on the climb, BMC's pressure reduced the lead by 20 seconds and dropped several riders from the chasing group. At the top, with 17 kilometres (11 miles) left, Oss was leading the group, while Greg Van Avermaet, BMC's team leader, was a couple of places further back. Van Avermaet was riding on the wheel of Alexandr Kolobnev (Team Katusha), who missed a corner and was forced to brake. Van Avermaet also braked; this action caused him to somersault over his handlebars and crash, injuring him and taking him out of contention for the rest of the race.

With Van Avermaet injured, BMC were no longer riding at the front of the group and the breakaway's lead quickly grew to 50 seconds, with only Team Katusha's Luca Paolini leading the chase. The gap was reduced slightly to 40 seconds as the riders entered the last 5 kilometres (3.1 miles). With 4 kilometres (2.5 miles) left, Thomas attacked the lead group and Štybar waited for Sagan to respond. Sagan, however, was unable to chase Thomas, who built a gap ahead of the other two. Štybar eventually gave chase, but he was unable to catch Thomas. After the race, he attributed his loss to two seconds' hesitation. Thomas continued alone to win the race ahead of Štybar by 25 seconds. Sagan, meanwhile, was both caught and left behind by the main chase group and finished 30th, over a minute behind Thomas. In the main peloton, Matteo Trentin was led out by his teammates Stijn Vandenbergh and Yves Lampaert. Another teammate, Niki Terpstra, was able to block Alexander Kristoff as he attempted the sprint and Trentin took the third podium place, 38 seconds behind Thomas and 13 seconds behind Štybar.

== Result ==
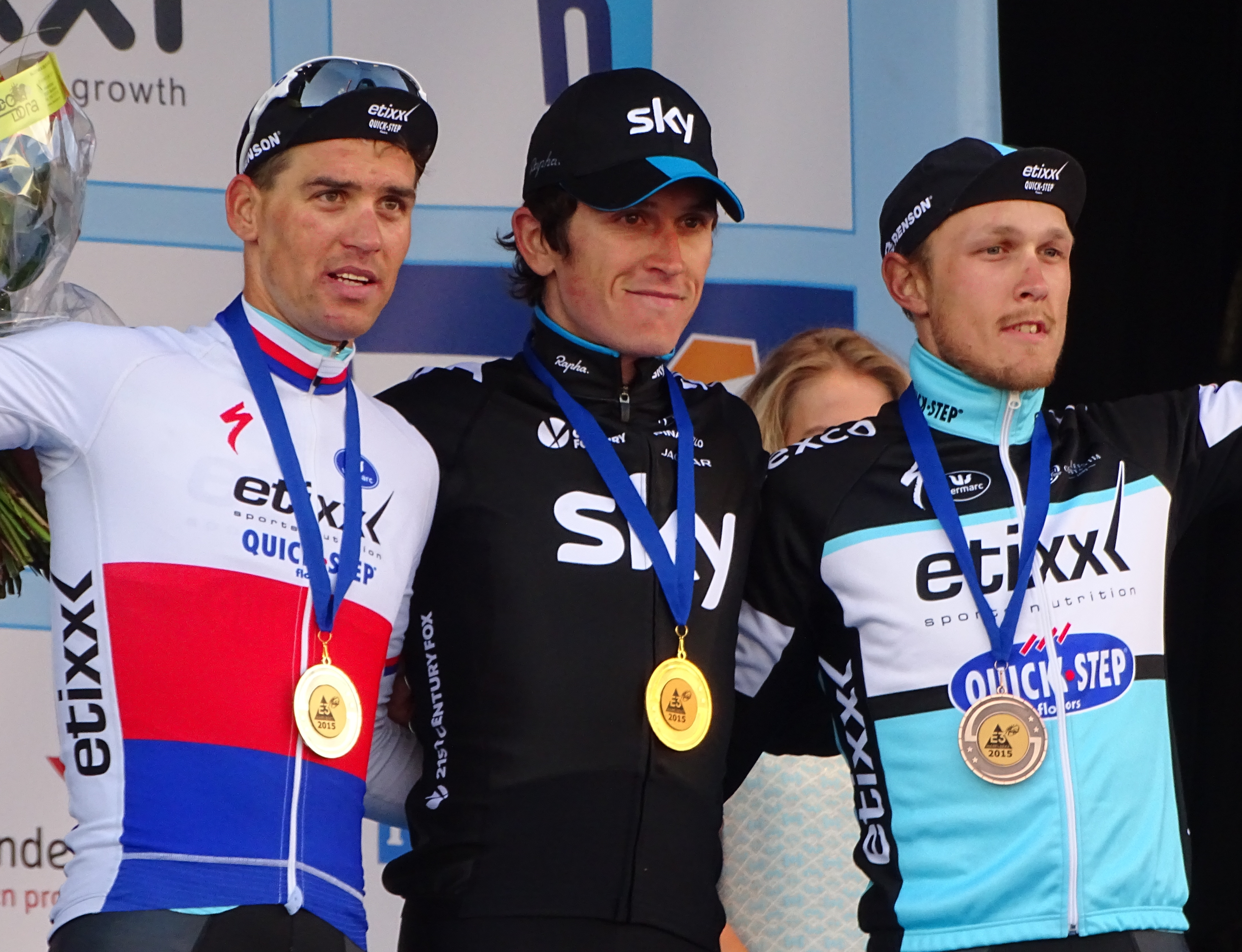
Zdeněk Štybar (2nd), Geraint Thomas (1st) and Matteo Trentin (3rd)

Result (1–10)
Rank	Rider	Team	Time
1	Geraint Thomas (GBR)	Team Sky	5h 15' 00"
2	Zdeněk Štybar (CZE)	Etixx–Quick-Step	+ 25"
3	Matteo Trentin (ITA)	Etixx–Quick-Step	+ 38"
4	Alexander Kristoff (NOR)	Team Katusha	+ 38"
5	Sep Vanmarcke (BEL)	LottoNL–Jumbo	+ 38"
6	Matti Breschel (DEN)	Tinkoff–Saxo	+ 38"
7	Jürgen Roelandts (BEL)	Lotto–Soudal	+ 38"
8	Jack Bauer (NZL)	Cannondale–Garmin	+ 38"
9	Jens Keukeleire (BEL)	Orica–GreenEDGE	+ 38"
10	Daniel Oss (ITA)	BMC Racing Team	+ 38"
