= 2013 Grote Prijs Jef Scherens =

Race details
- Dates: 15 September 2013
- Stages: 1
- Distance: 197 km (122.4 mi)
- Winning time: 4h 45' 33"

Results
	Winner	Bert De Backer (BEL)
	Second	Sep Vanmarcke (BEL)
	Third	Jasper Stuyven (BEL)

The 2013 Grote Prijs Jef Scherens was the 47th edition of the Grote Prijs Jef Scherens cycle race and was held on 15 September 2013. The race started and finished in Leuven. The race was won by Bert De Backer.

== General classification ==
Final general classification

Rank	Rider	Time
1	Bert De Backer (BEL)	4h 45' 33"
2	Sep Vanmarcke (BEL)	+ 0"
3	Jasper Stuyven (BEL)	+ 3"
4	Marcel Sieberg (GER)	+ 11"
5	Roy Curvers (NED)	+ 11"
6	Jurgen Van Goolen (BEL)	+ 11"
7	Jelle Wallays (BEL)	+ 11"
8	Gaëtan Bille (BEL)	+ 15"
9	André Greipel (GER)	+ 32"
10	Tom Leezer (NED)	+ 32"
