= 2019 Bretagne Classic Ouest-France =

Cycling race

2019 Bretagne Classic Ouest–France
2019 UCI World Tour, race 34 of 38

Race details
- Dates: 1 September 2019
- Stages: 1
- Distance: 248.1 km (154.2 mi)
- Winning time: 6h 12' 23"

Results
	Winner	Sep Vanmarcke (BEL)	(EF Education First)
	Second	Tiesj Benoot (BEL)	(Lotto–Soudal)
	Third	Jack Haig (AUS)	(Mitchelton–Scott)

The 2019 Bretagne Classic Ouest–France was a road cycling one-day race that took place on 1 September 2019 in France. It was the 83rd edition of Bretagne Classic Ouest–France and the 34th event of the 2019 UCI World Tour. It was won by Sep Vanmarcke.

== Teams ==
Twenty-five teams, including all 18 UCI WorldTour teams and seven UCI Professional Continental teams, participated in the race. Each team could enter a maximum of seven riders, but Astana, Bahrain–Merida, and Team Katusha–Alpecin each submitted six riders, meaning the race began with a peloton of 172 riders. Of those riders, only 90 finished the race.

UCI WorldTeams

- AG2R La Mondiale
- Astana
- Bahrain–Merida
- Bora–Hansgrohe
- CCC Team
- Deceuninck–Quick-Step
- EF Education First
- Groupama–FDJ
- Lotto–Soudal
- Mitchelton–Scott
- Movistar Team
- Team Dimension Data
- Team Ineos
- Team Jumbo–Visma
- Team Katusha–Alpecin
- Team Sunweb
- Trek–Segafredo
- UAE Team Emirates

UCI Professional Continental teams

- Arkéa–Samsic
- Cofidis
- Delko–Marseille Provence
- Israel Cycling Academy
- Total Direct Énergie
- Vital Concept–B&B Hotels
- Wanty–Gobert

== Results ==
Result
Rank	Rider	Team	Time
1	Sep Vanmarcke (BEL)	EF Education First	6h 12' 23"
2	Tiesj Benoot (BEL)	Lotto–Soudal	+ 3"
3	Jack Haig (AUS)	Mitchelton–Scott	+ 3"
4	Michael Valgren (DEN)	Team Dimension Data	+ 20"
5	Amund Grøndahl Jansen (NOR)	Team Jumbo–Visma	+ 20"
6	Benoît Cosnefroy (FRA)	AG2R La Mondiale	+ 20"
7	Greg Van Avermaet (BEL)	CCC Team	+ 20"
8	Tim Wellens (BEL)	Lotto–Soudal	+ 22"
9	Florian Sénéchal (FRA)	Deceuninck–Quick-Step	+ 28"
10	Eduard Prades (ESP)	Movistar Team	+ 28"
