= 2015 Gent–Wevelgem =

2015 UCI World Tour, race 7 of 28
- Event poster with previous winner John Degenkolb

Race details
- Dates: 29 March 2015
- Distance: 239 km (149 mi)
- Winning time: 6h 20' 55"

Results
	Winner	Luca Paolini (ITA)	(Team Katusha)
	Second	Niki Terpstra (NED)	(Etixx–Quick-Step)
	Third	Geraint Thomas (GBR)	(Team Sky)

The 2015 Gent–Wevelgem was a one-day cycling classic that took place in Belgium and France on 29 March 2015 over 239 kilometres between Deinze and Wevelgem. It was the 77th edition of the Gent–Wevelgem race, and the seventh race of the 2015 UCI World Tour. The winner was Italy's Luca Paolini of Team Katusha.

Gent–Wevelgem was part of the spring classics, denoted as the "sprinter's classic", because its terrain was less challenging than most of the other classics. The 2015 edition followed a 239-kilometre (149-mile) route that started in Deinze and ended in Wevelgem. The race took place in difficult weather conditions with heavy wind and rain; as a result, only 39 riders finished the race of the 200 who had started. The race was won by Luca Paolini (Team Katusha), who attacked a small group in the final 6 kilometres (3.7 miles) and took a solo victory. Niki Terpstra (Etixx–Quick-Step) sprinted to second place, ahead of Geraint Thomas (Team Sky).

== Route ==
The 2015 Gent–Wevelgem was 239 kilometres (149 miles) in length, starting in the Belgian city of Deinze, west of the city of Ghent, and finishing in Wevelgem. Most of the spring classics centred around Oudenaarde and the many small hills in the nearby region. Gent–Wevelgem, however, travelled west into West Flanders and France and had fewer hills, making it more suitable for sprinters.

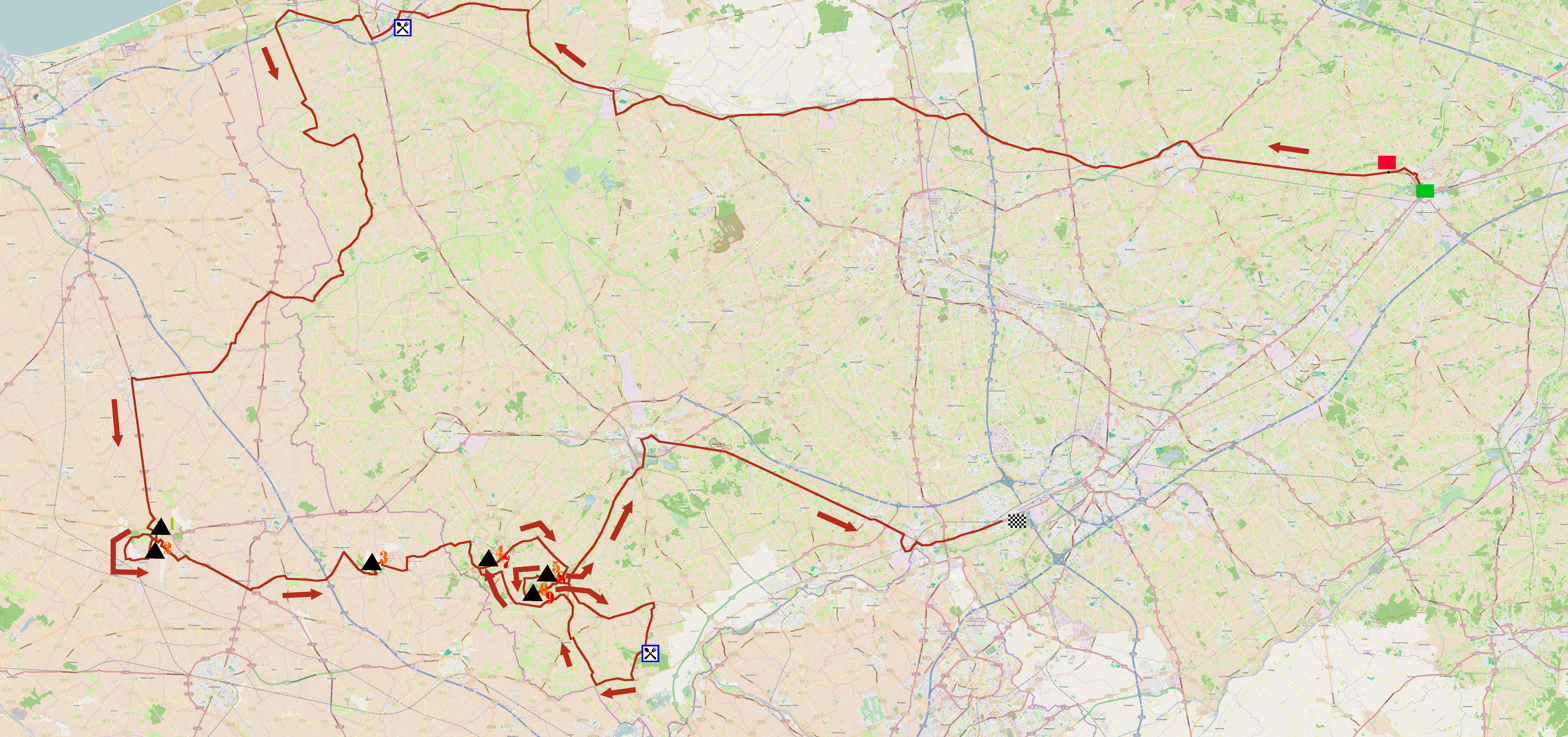
Route of the 2015 Gent–Wevelgem

After the race began in the Grote Markt in Deinze, the route took the riders west towards the coast; after 73 kilometres (45 miles) of flat roads, they reached Adinkerke, southwest of Nieuwpoort, where the route turned south. They travelled another 23 kilometres (14 miles) before reaching Roesbrugge and, after 97.8 kilometres (60.8 miles), entered the Nord department of France. The first 12 kilometres (7.5 miles) of French roads took them west, before they turned south at Wormhout. The first climb of the day came another 10 kilometres (6.2 miles) later, as the riders climbed the Casselberg. A 6-kilometre (3.7-mile) loop brought them round to climb the Casselberg a second time, though from a different direction.

The route then turned east; the final French climb was the Catsberg, which came after 143 kilometres (89 miles). The riders continued east after this and, after 148.2 kilometres (92.1 miles), re-entered Belgium at Westouter, on the outskirts of Heuvelland, to enter the key section of the race. This began with the climb of the Baneberg, 152 kilometres (94 miles) from the start. 8 kilometres (5.0 miles) later, they climbed the Kemmelberg in the town of Kemmel. 4 kilometres (2.5 miles) after that, they climbed the Monteberg. This succession of climbs was interspersed with steep descents, including the difficult descent of the Kemmelberg. A flat, 29-kilometre (18-mile) section of road followed, as the route went east towards Mesen, then gradually looped back west through Nieuwkerke. After this flat section, the riders returned to the same roads that they had ridden previously and repeated the Baneberg–Kemmelberg–Monteberg sequence of climbs.

At the top of the second climb of the Monteberg, 34.6 kilometres (21.5 miles) remained, mostly on flat roads. The route turned north-east out of Kemmel to Ypres, where several cobbled roads were used. After Ypres, the route turned east through Menen and into Wevelgem.

== Teams ==
As Gent–Wevelgem was a UCI World Tour event, all 17 UCI WorldTeams were invited automatically and were obliged to send a squad. Eight Professional Continental teams received wildcard invitations. With eight riders on each team, the peloton at the beginning of the race was made up of 200 riders.

UCI WorldTeams

- AG2R La Mondiale
- Astana
- BMC Racing Team
- Etixx–Quick-Step
- FDJ
- IAM Cycling
- Lampre–Merida
- Lotto–Soudal
- Movistar Team
- Orica–GreenEDGE
- Cannondale–Garmin
- Team Giant–Alpecin
- Team Katusha
- LottoNL–Jumbo
- Team Sky
- Tinkoff–Saxo
- Trek Factory Racing

UCI Professional Continental teams

- Cofidis
- Team Europcar
- Team Roompot
- MTN–Qhubeka
- Southeast Pro Cycling
- Bora–Argon 18
- Topsport Vlaanderen–Baloise
- Wanty–Groupe Gobert

== Pre-race favourites ==
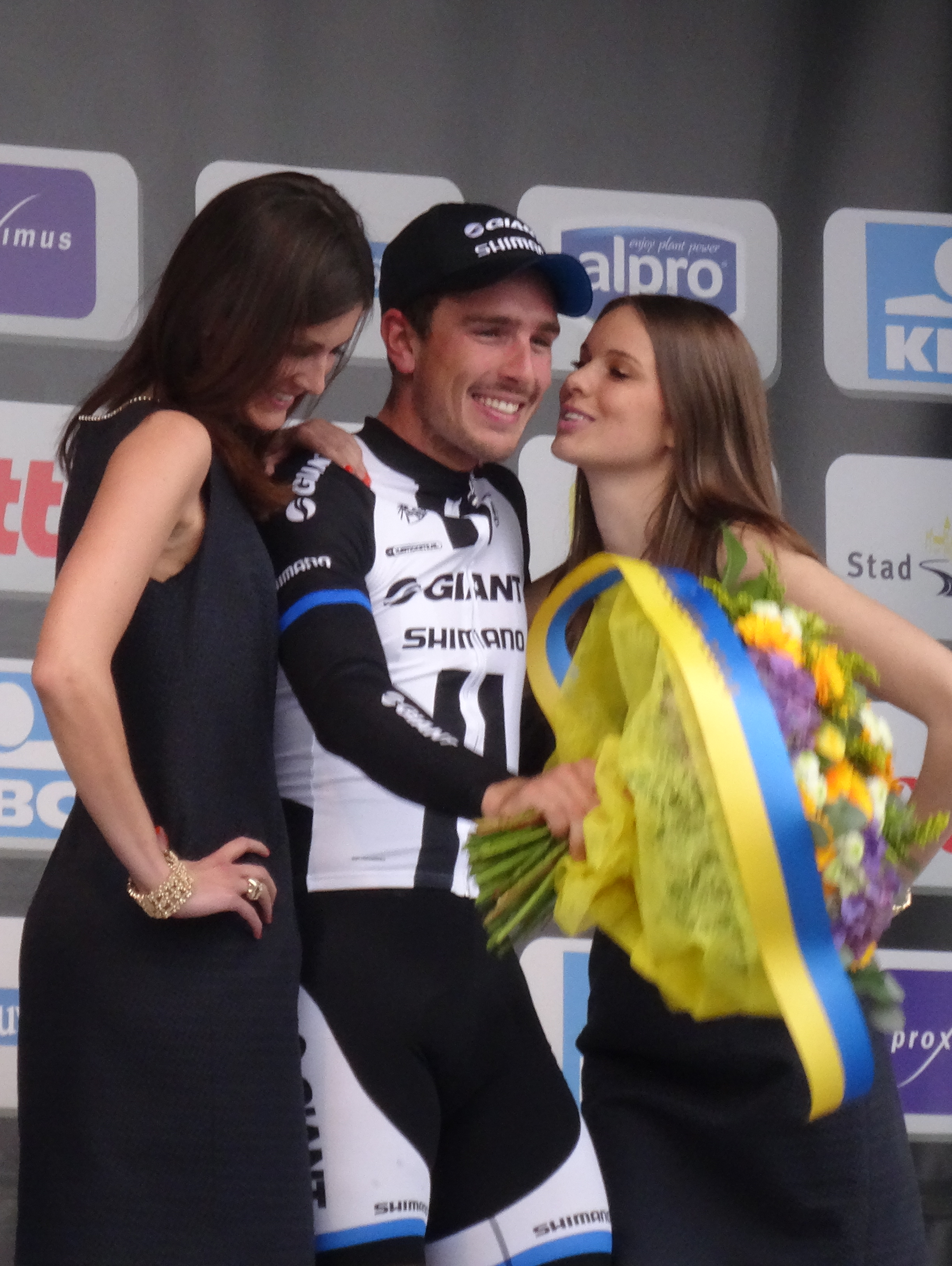
John Degenkolb (Team Giant–Alpecin) won the 2014 Gent–Wevelgem (podium ceremony photographed) and was among the favourites for the 2015 race.

The 2015 Gent–Wevelgem was without two of the main classics riders, Tom Boonen (Etixx–Quick-Step) and Fabian Cancellara (Trek Factory Racing), both of whom had been injured in races earlier in the spring. However, their absence was not expected to affect the race as much as it would other races in the classics season, such as the Tour of Flanders the following weekend, as Gent–Wevelgem was particularly suited to sprinters. This was because it had fewer climbs than the other spring classics; difficulty often came from crosswinds on the exposed parts of West Flanders.

The defending champion, John Degenkolb (Team Giant–Alpecin), was the principal favourite for victory before the race. He had won Milan–San Remo the week before and was in good form. A sprinter, Degenkolb had good ability at getting over short climbs, having had no difficulty on the Kemmelberg in the 2014 Gent–Wevelgem.

Alexander Kristoff (Team Katusha), who was second in Milan–San Remo and fourth a few days earlier at E3 Harelbeke, was also among the favourites, especially in the bad weather expected for Gent–Wevelgem. Peter Sagan (Tinkoff–Saxo), the 2013 champion, was also in form following E3 Harelbeke, and was expected to be able to win either from a bunch sprint or from an attack.

The Etixx–Quick-Step team was also expected to feature strongly in the race, even in Boonen's absence. They were led by Mark Cavendish, one of the strongest sprinters, who had already won Kuurne–Brussels–Kuurne, which was similar to Gent–Wevelgem. Other options for the team included Zdeněk Štybar, second in E3 Harelbeke. Team Sky also brought a strong squad. Their team included Geraint Thomas, the winner of E3 Harelbeke, Ian Stannard, the winner of Omloop Het Nieuwsblad, and Bradley Wiggins, but they were expected to support sprinter Elia Viviani.

There were many other riders considered to have a chance of victory in the race. These included classics riders such as Sep Vanmarcke (LottoNL–Jumbo), Daniel Oss and Greg Van Avermaet (both BMC Racing Team) and sprinters such as André Greipel (Lotto–Soudal), Arnaud Démare (FDJ), Nacer Bouhanni (Cofidis), Sam Bennett (Bora–Argon 18), Heinrich Haussler (IAM Cycling), Sacha Modolo (Lampre–Merida), Adam Blythe (Orica–GreenEDGE), Tyler Farrar and Edvald Boasson Hagen (both MTN–Qhubeka). Moreno Hofland (LottoNL–Jumbo) was also expected to be among the favourites, but he withdrew the day before the race with an illness.

== Race report ==
The race took place in very wet and windy conditions. This included a headwind in the early stages of the race, which delayed the formation of a breakaway. When the breakaway did form, it included seven riders, who built up a nine-minute lead within the first hour of racing. These riders were Tim Kerkhof (Team Roompot), Alexis Gougeard (AG2R La Mondiale), Albert Timmer (Team Giant–Alpecin), Alex Dowsett (Movistar Team), Pavel Brutt (Tinkoff–Saxo), Jesse Sergent (Trek Factory Racing) and Mirko Tedeschi (Southeast Pro Cycling). Soon afterwards the peloton was split into groups as riders began to withdraw from the race. The principal difficulty throughout the race was the wind: Cyclingnews.com described the riders as "constantly balancing on their bike, leaning into the wind, trying not to be blown off the road".

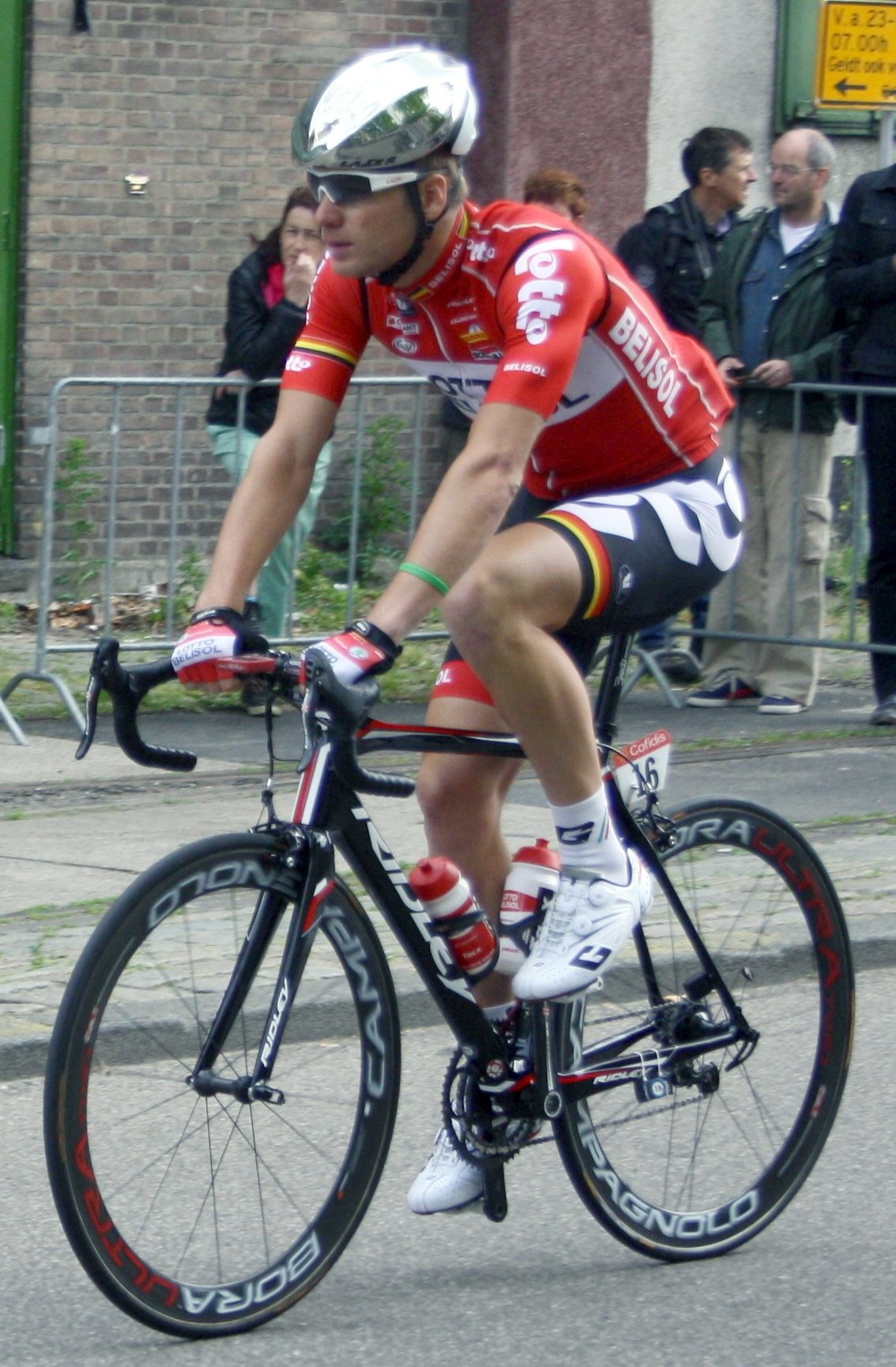
Jürgen Roelandts (Lotto–Soudal) spent more than 50 kilometres (31 miles) in a solo breakaway and eventually finished seventh.

As the riders entered the flat lands near the Belgian coast, the winds became more problematic. Around three-quarters of the peloton had been dropped or had withdrawn from the race by the time the riders turned back inland. Gert Steegmans (Trek Factory Racing) was blown sideways into a ditch; the wind knocked several other riders over and caused Martin Velits (Etixx–Quick-Step) and Lars Bak (Lotto–Soudal) to withdraw from the race. Mark Cavendish crashed and was forced to chase to attempt to rejoin the leading riders. The conditions were so severe that some team officials called for the race to be neutralised to ensure the riders' safety. Shortly afterwards, two large groups came back together. The main peloton was therefore made up of around 100 riders and was approximately two minutes behind the breakaway. The breakaway was caught soon afterwards.

Around Cassel, the peloton was again split into small groups by the strong winds. The front group was reduced to 25 riders. Bradley Wiggins was left behind and withdrew from the race, along with Edvald Boasson Hagen (MTN–Qhubeka), who had hit a pole by the side of the road and had broken his clavicle. The front group included Vanmarcke, Thomas, Kristoff and Sagan, with Démare, Greipel, Matti Breschel and Van Avermaet joining soon afterwards. On the Catsberg, Maarten Tjallingii (LottoNL–Jumbo) attacked alone and gained a one-minute lead over the main group. Several riders attacked the group but no one was able to get away and they came to the Kemmelberg together.

Jürgen Roelandts (Lotto–Soudal) attacked after the summit of the Kemmelberg. He initially built a small lead over the chasing group, which was led by riders from Etixx–Quick-Step. They stopped chasing, however, after Zdeněk Štybar suffered a puncture. This allowed riders to attack the group. Stijn Vandenbergh (Etixx–Quick-Step) was the first to attack; he was then joined first by Daniel Oss (BMC Racing Team) and Thomas, and then also by Jens Debusschere (Lotto–Soudal) and Vanmarcke. Despite their superior numbers, Roelandts was able to maintain his lead; the peloton, meanwhile, quickly fell a long way behind. Riders continued to crash during this period, including Sylvain Chavanel (IAM Cycling) and Mathew Hayman (Orica–GreenEDGE). Jack Bauer (Cannondale–Garmin) suffered a crash when another rider's rain jacket got caught in the spokes of his wheels; he picked up his bike and threw it into a ditch. With many of the team cars full, some riders asked for directions so that they could ride directly to their team hotels rather than completing the race.

Luca Paolini (Team Katusha) attacked from the main group and caught the five chasers, with Niki Terpstra (Etixx–Quick-Step) doing the same shortly afterwards. While Paolini and Terpstra were chasing, Geraint Thomas was blown violently from his bike, landing on his left shoulder. He landed on the grass and was able to rejoin the group, although he appeared to be shaken by the crash. As the riders approached the Kemmelberg for the final time, Roelandts had a lead of around two minutes. Vandenbergh led up the climb, with Thomas following closely and the other riders struggling. Vanmarcke and Terpstra soon caught up, with Debusschere quickly following. Paolini eventually returned to the group, but Oss was unable to do so. As they crossed the final climb of the day with 30 kilometres (19 miles) remaining, Roelandts had a one-minute lead ahead of the six-man group.

By this point, Roelandts had led solo for around 50 kilometres (31 miles) and was beginning to struggle. He was caught with around 20 kilometres (12 miles) remaining. As he was caught, Terpstra suffered a puncture. He quickly returned to the group and immediately attacked, with Paolini joining him. Thomas led the chase, with Vanmarcke and Debusschere looking tired. The six riders therefore came into the final 10 kilometres (6.2 miles) together. With around 6 kilometres (3.7 miles) remaining, Paolini attacked and was chased down by the other riders; he then attacked again and built a gap, which he was able to maintain to the finish. Terpstra beat Thomas to second place, followed by Vandenbergh, Debusschere, and Vanmarcke within a minute and Roelandts and Oss further behind. The main peloton came in more than five minutes behind Paolini, with Kristoff winning the sprint for ninth place ahead of Sagan. Only 39 riders finished the race.

== Results ==
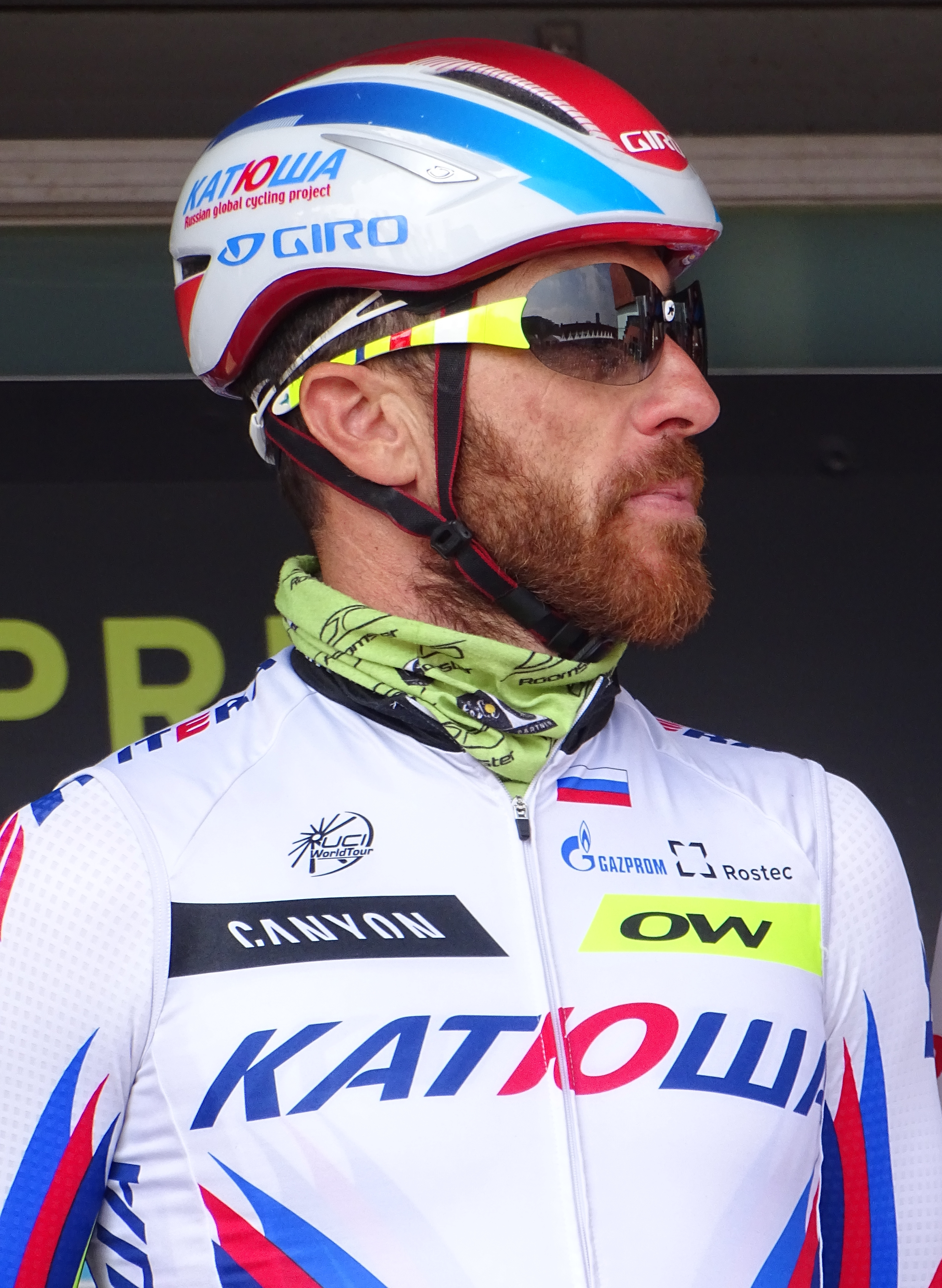
Luca Paolini (Team Katusha) attacked in the final kilometres to win a solo victory.

Result (1–10)
Rank	Rider	Team	Time
1	Luca Paolini (ITA)	Team Katusha	6h 20' 55"
2	Niki Terpstra (NED)	Etixx–Quick-Step	+ 11"
3	Geraint Thomas (GBR)	Team Sky	+ 11"
4	Stijn Vandenbergh (BEL)	Etixx–Quick-Step	+ 18"
5	Jens Debusschere (BEL)	Lotto–Soudal	+ 26"
6	Sep Vanmarcke (BEL)	LottoNL–Jumbo	+ 40"
7	Jürgen Roelandts (BEL)	Lotto–Soudal	+ 1' 51"
8	Daniel Oss (ITA)	BMC Racing Team	+ 4' 15"
9	Alexander Kristoff (NOR)	Team Katusha	+ 6' 54"
10	Peter Sagan (SVK)	Tinkoff–Saxo	+ 6' 54"

== Post-race analysis ==
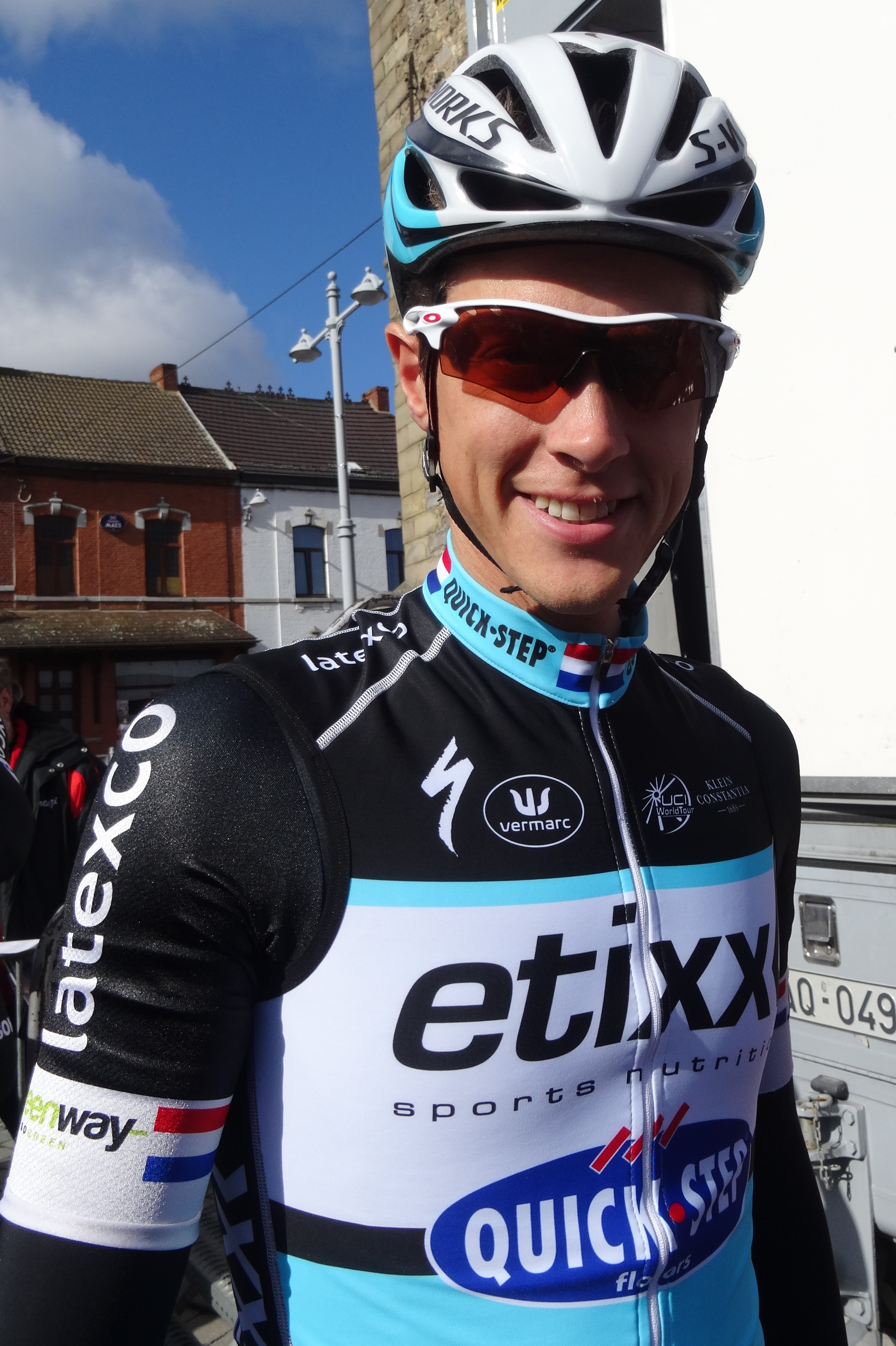
Niki Terpstra (Etixx–Quick-Step) finished second after several crashes for his teammates (pictured at the 2015 Le Samyn).

There was widespread comment in the media after the race about the weather conditions. Cyclingnews.com described it as "mayhem" and "one of the wildest [races] in recent years". Paolini said that he had crashed twice on the way to victory and had used a total of three bikes, but also that he had been lucky later in the race. He said "we're up in the north and this is real cycling". Paolini pointed at his head and heart as he crossed the finish line – the same gesture that he had performed when winning a stage in the 2013 Giro d'Italia – and explained the gesture as indicating that such wins required "head and heart as much as legs".

Patrick Lefevere, the Etixx–Quick-Step team manager, afterwards described the team's "bad luck" throughout the race, which included crashes for Cavendish and Martin Velits and punctures for Terpstra and Štybar. Lefevere pointed to the absence of Tom Boonen as a reason for his riders' nervousness. Geraint Thomas felt that the other riders had been looking at him in particular to chase Paolini because of his win in the E3 Harelbeke; he said that he "didn't have much left" in the sprint at the end of the race.

VeloNews wrote that the riders had come close to calling for the neutralisation of the race because of the extreme weather conditions. The winds reached approximately 70 to 80 km/h (40–50 mph) and were so strong that the riders were even unable to form into echelons. However the website also quoted Brian Cookson, the president of the Union Cycliste Internationale (UCI), who described the conditions as "very difficult, but not impossible" and the race as "a real classic".
