= 2012 Omloop Het Nieuwsblad =

- Event poster with previous winner Sebastian Langeveld

Race details
- Dates: 25 February 2012
- Stages: 1
- Distance: 200 km (120 mi)
- Winning time: 4h 52' 34"

Results
	Winner	Sep Vanmarcke (Belgium)	(Garmin–Barracuda)
	Second	Tom Boonen (Belgium)	(Omega Pharma–Quick-Step)
	Third	Juan Antonio Flecha (Spain)	(Team Sky)

The 2012 Omloop Het Nieuwsblad took place on 25 February 2012. It was the 67th edition of the international classic Omloop Het Nieuwsblad. This year's Omloop started and ended at St. Peter's Square in Ghent, Belgium and spanned 200 km (124.3 mi) in the province of East Flanders. The race was the first 1.HC event in the 2012 UCI Europe Tour.

The race was won by Belgium's Sep Vanmarcke of the Garmin–Barracuda team, taking his first professional victory in a three-man sprint finish in Ghent. Vanmarcke out-sprinted Omega Pharma–Quick-Step's Tom Boonen and Team Sky's Juan Antonio Flecha, the 2010 winner, to the line.

== Teams ==
As this was a UCI 1.HC event, the organizers, the Flanders Classics Federation, were allowed to invite UCI ProTeams (maximum 70% of the total field), UCI Professional Continental teams, and UCI Continental teams.

Non ProTeams teams are indicated by an asterisk below. Each of the 25 teams were permitted up to eight riders, for a total of 196 riders.

- Accent.jobs–Willems Veranda's*
- Ag2r–La Mondiale
- BMC Racing Team
- Bretagne–Schuller*
- Champion System*
- Cofidis*
- Farnese Vini–Selle Italia*
- FDJ–BigMat
- Garmin–Barracuda
- GreenEDGE
- Landbouwkrediet–Euphony*
- Lotto–Belisol
- Omega Pharma–Quick-Step
- Project 1t4i*
- Rabobank
- RusVelo*
- Saur–Sojasun*
- SpiderTech–C10*
- Team Europcar*
- Team Katusha
- Team NetApp*
- Team Sky
- Team Type 1–Sanofi*
- Topsport Vlaanderen–Mercator*
- Vacansoleil–DCM

== Pre-race favourites ==
Pre-race favourites included:

- Tom Boonen (BEL) – 2005 UCI World Road Race Champion, 3 time Paris–Roubaix Champion, 2 time Tour of Flanders Champion
- Philippe Gilbert (BEL) – 2 time Giro di Lombardia Champion, 2010 Amstel Gold Race Champion, 2 time Omloop Het Nieuwsblad Champion
- Juan Antonio Flecha (ESP) – 2010 Omloop Het Nieuwsblad Champion, 2011 Omloop Het Nieuwsblad Runner-up
- Greg Van Avermaet (BEL)
- Matti Breschel (DEN)
- Heinrich Haussler (AUS)

== Results ==
Result
Rank	Rider	Team	Time
1	Sep Vanmarcke (BEL)	Garmin–Barracuda	4h 52' 34"
2	Tom Boonen (BEL)	Omega Pharma–Quick-Step	+ 0"
3	Juan Antonio Flecha (ESP)	Team Sky	+ 0"
4	Heinrich Haussler (AUS)	Garmin–Barracuda	+ 25"
5	Greg Van Avermaet (BEL)	BMC Racing Team	+ 25"
6	Marco Marcato (ITA)	Vacansoleil–DCM	+ 25"
7	Lloyd Mondory (FRA)	Ag2r–La Mondiale	+ 25"
8	Matthieu Ladagnous (FRA)	FDJ–BigMat	+ 25"
9	Alexandre Pichot (FRA)	Team Europcar	+ 25"
10	Staf Scheirlinckx (BEL)	Accent.jobs–Willems Veranda's	+ 25"
