= 2014 Tour of Flanders =

2014 UCI World Tour, race 8 of 29

Race details
- Dates: 6 April 2014
- Stages: 1
- Distance: 259 km (161 mi)
- Winning time: 6h 15' 18"

Results
	Winner	Fabian Cancellara (SUI)	(Trek Factory Racing)
	Second	Greg Van Avermaet (BEL)	(BMC Racing Team)
	Third	Sep Vanmarcke (BEL)	(Belkin Pro Cycling)

The 2014 Tour of Flanders was the 98th edition of the Tour of Flanders single-day Monument classics. It was held on 6 April 2014 over a distance of 259 kilometres (160.9 miles) from Bruges to Oudenaarde. In a four-rider sprint finish, Swiss rider Fabian Cancellara won the race for a record-equalling third time – and for the second year in succession – ahead of Belgian trio Greg Van Avermaet, Sep Vanmarcke and Stijn Vandenbergh.

== Route ==
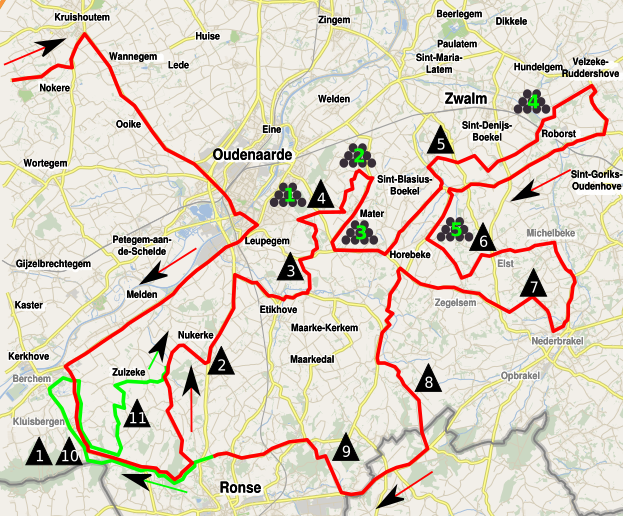
First lap of the circuit (red) and transition to the second lap (green).

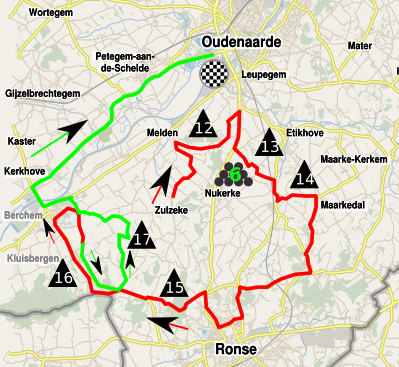
Second lap of the circuit (red) and final (green)

== Teams ==
As the Tour of Flanders was a UCI World Tour event, all 18 UCI ProTeams were invited automatically and obligated to send a squad. Seven other squads were given wildcard places, thus completing the 25-team peloton.

The 25 teams that competed in the race were:

- Ag2r–La Mondiale
- Androni Giocattoli–Venezuela
- Astana
- Belkin Pro Cycling
- BMC Racing Team
- Cannondale
- Cofidis
- Team Europcar
- FDJ.fr
- Garmin–Sharp
- Giant–Shimano
- IAM Cycling
- Team Katusha
- Lampre–Merida
- Lotto–Belisol
- Movistar Team
- MTN–Qhubeka
- NetApp–Endura
- Omega Pharma–Quick-Step
- Orica–GreenEDGE
- Team Sky
- Tinkoff–Saxo
- Topsport Vlaanderen–Baloise
- Trek Factory Racing
- Wanty–Groupe Gobert

== Results ==
	Cyclist	Team	Time	UCI World Tour Points
1	Fabian Cancellara (SUI)	Trek Factory Racing	6h 15' 18"	100
2	Greg Van Avermaet (BEL)	BMC Racing Team	s.t.	80
3	Sep Vanmarcke (BEL)	Belkin Pro Cycling	s.t.	70
4	Stijn Vandenbergh (BEL)	Omega Pharma–Quick-Step	s.t.	60
5	Alexander Kristoff (NOR)	Team Katusha	+ 8"	50
6	Niki Terpstra (NED)	Omega Pharma–Quick-Step	+ 18"	40
7	Tom Boonen (BEL)	Omega Pharma–Quick-Step	+ 35"	30
8	Geraint Thomas (GBR)	Team Sky	+ 37"	20
9	Björn Leukemans (BEL)	Wanty–Groupe Gobert	+ 41"	–
10	Sebastian Langeveld (NED)	Garmin–Sharp	+ 43"	4
