= 2014 E3 Harelbeke =

2014 UCI World Tour, race 6 of 28

Race details
- Dates: 28 March 2014
- Stages: 1
- Distance: 212 km (132 mi)
- Winning time: 4h 56' 31"

Results
	Winner	Peter Sagan (Slovakia)	(Cannondale)
	Second	Niki Terpstra (Netherlands)	(Omega Pharma–Quick-Step)
	Third	Geraint Thomas (Great Britain)	(Team Sky)

The 2014 E3 Harelbeke was the 57th running of the E3 Harelbeke single-day cycling race. It was held on 28 March 2014, over a distance of 212 kilometres (131.7 miles) and was the sixth race of the 2014 UCI World Tour season. The race is often seen as a preparation race for the Tour of Flanders. The race was won by Peter Sagan in a four-man sprint finish.

== Teams ==
As E3 Harelbeke was a UCI World Tour event, all 18 UCI ProTeams were invited automatically and obligated to send a squad. Seven other squads were given wildcard places, thus completing the 25-team peloton.

The 25 teams that competed in the race were:

- Ag2r–La Mondiale
- Androni Giocattoli–Venezuela
- Astana
- Belkin Pro Cycling
- BMC Racing Team
- Cannondale
- Cofidis
- Team Europcar
- FDJ.fr
- Garmin–Sharp
- Giant–Shimano
- IAM Cycling
- Team Katusha
- Lampre–Merida
- Lotto–Belisol
- Movistar Team
- MTN–Qhubeka
- Omega Pharma–Quick-Step
- Orica–GreenEDGE
- Team Sky
- Tinkoff–Saxo
- Trek Factory Racing
- Topsport Vlaanderen–Baloise
- UnitedHealthcare
- Wanty–Groupe Gobert

== Pre-race favourites ==
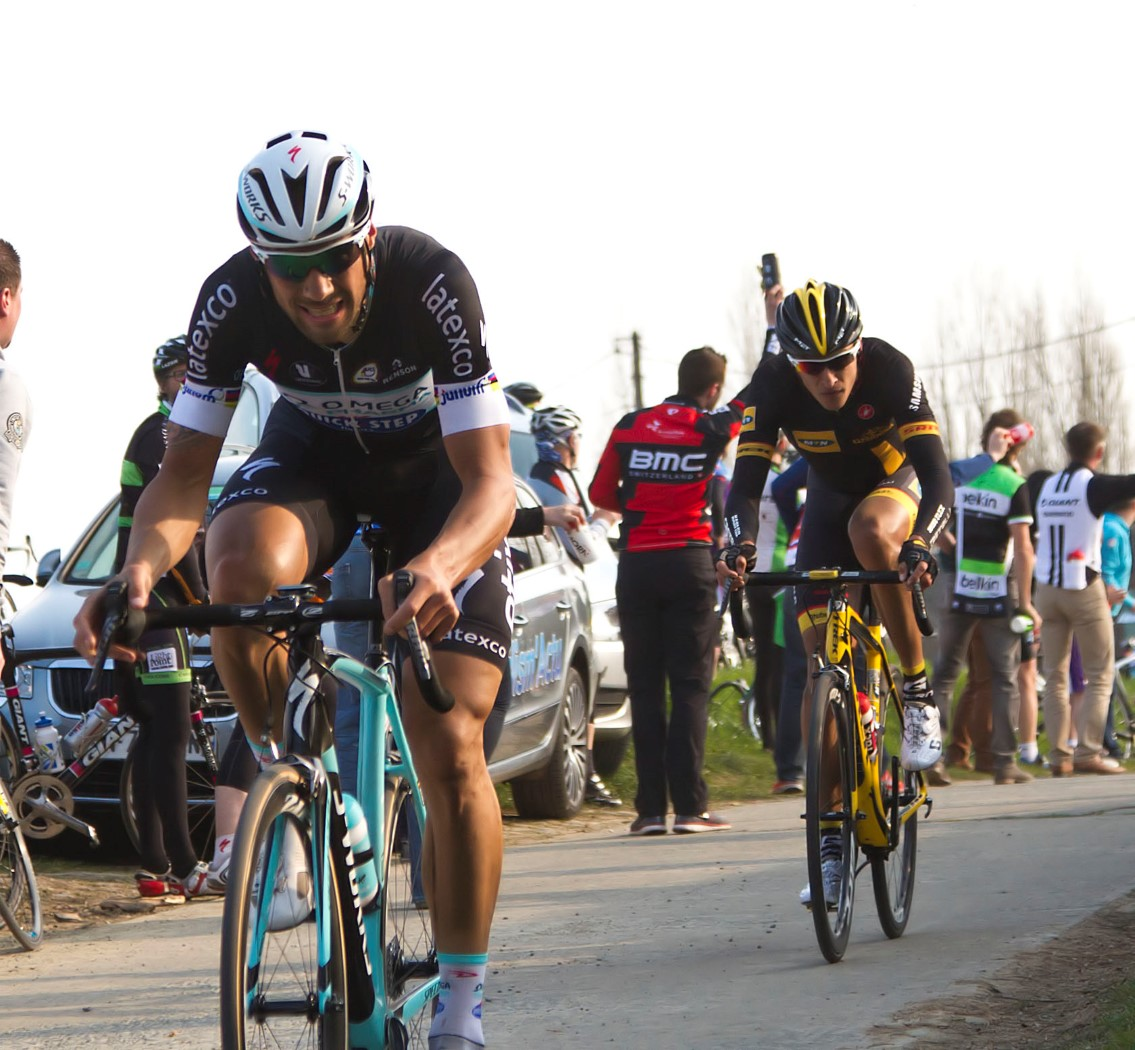
Tom Boonen during the race

E3 Harelbeke comes early in the year so riders who have performed well already in the season are considered highly. Peter Sagan (Cannondale) returned to E3 after a podium finish in 2013 he was considered one of the three main contenders along with Fabian Cancellara (Trek Factory Racing) and Tom Boonen (Omega Pharma–Quick-Step). Other riders expected to do well included Filippo Pozzato (Lampre–Merida), Greg Van Avermaet (BMC Racing Team), Sep Vanmarcke (Belkin Pro Cycling), Edvald Boasson Hagen (Team Sky) and Alejandro Valverde (Movistar Team). Matteo Trentin and Mark Renshaw both from Omega Pharma–Quick-Step were expected to finish highly in the race but pulled out of the race following a tough Milan–San Remo.

== Race report ==
The 212 km day started with high paced racing where many riders tried to form a break but were caught by the peloton again. About an hour into the race the first real break was established with five riders. They were: Maxime Daniel (Ag2r–La Mondiale), Jérôme Cousin (Team Europcar), Florian Sénéchal (Cofidis), Jay Thomson (MTN–Qhubeka) and Laurens De Vreese (Wanty–Groupe Gobert). The group worked well together gaining a maximum advantage of seven minutes over the peloton. The race had many crashes with Svein Tuft (Orica–GreenEDGE) the first to abandon.

With 45km to go Thor Hushovd (BMC Racing Team) was part of a high-speed crash involving Michel Kreder (Garmin–Sharp) where they both abandoned. Up next was the Kapelberg, a stretch of road before the decisive Paterberg and Oude Kwaremont. The break's gap had been reduced to one minute and a half with teams working hard to catch them. Cancellara was caught out by a major crash on the Kapelberg forcing him to chase.

Vanmarcke led the front group over the Paterberg while Geraint Thomas (Team Sky) led them over the Oude Kwaremont these efforts blew the peloton apart forming an eight-man group at the front followed by a fourteen-man chase bunch. Over the Karnemelkbeekstraat Sagan attacked with Thomas, Niki Terpstra and Stijn Vandenbergh (both Omega Pharma–Quick-Step) the only riders able to follow. With 10km to go the quartet had 45 seconds lead on the chase bunch. Since Omega Pharma–Quick-Step had two riders in the front bunch Terpstra stopped contributing to the pace making. Vandenbergh tried to attack multiple times in the final kilometeres but each time Thomas or Sagan would close him down. This led to a four-man sprint where Sagan took victory with Terpstra second and Thomas in third.

== Results ==
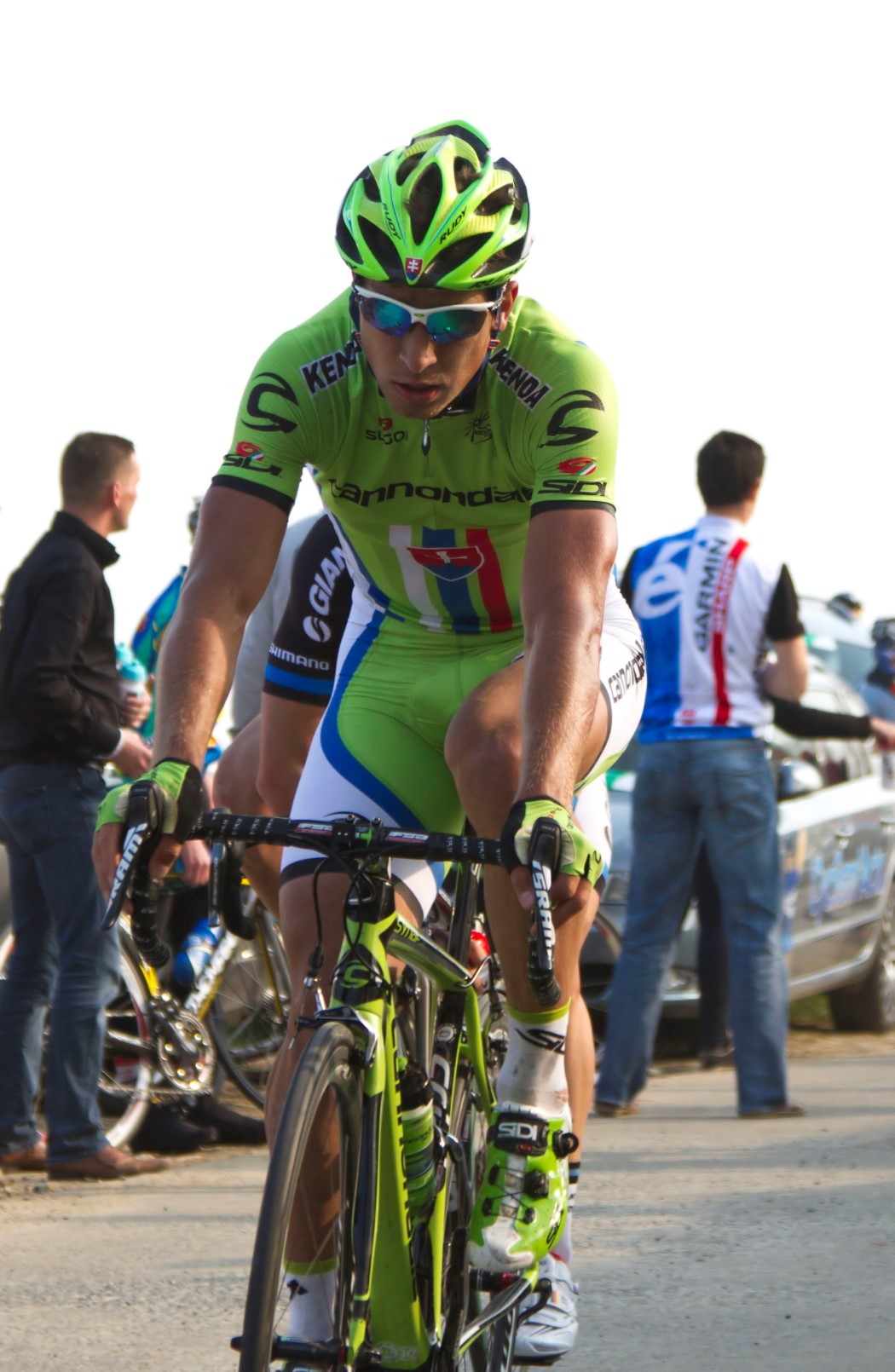
Winner Peter Sagan during the race

	Cyclist	Team	Time
1	Peter Sagan (SVK)	Cannondale	4h 56' 31"
2	Niki Terpstra (NED)	Omega Pharma–Quick-Step	s.t.
3	Geraint Thomas (GBR)	Team Sky	s.t.
4	Stijn Vandenbergh (BEL)	Omega Pharma–Quick-Step	s.t.
5	Sep Vanmarcke (BEL)	Belkin Pro Cycling	+ 1' 16"
6	Tony Gallopin (FRA)	Lotto–Belisol	+ 1' 16"
7	Borut Božič (SLO)	Astana	+ 1' 19"
8	Tyler Farrar (USA)	Garmin–Sharp	+ 1' 19"
9	Fabian Cancellara (SUI)	Trek Factory Racing	+ 1' 19"
10	Greg Van Avermaet (BEL)	BMC Racing Team	+ 1' 19"
