= Bert De Backer =

Belgian road cyclist (born 1984)

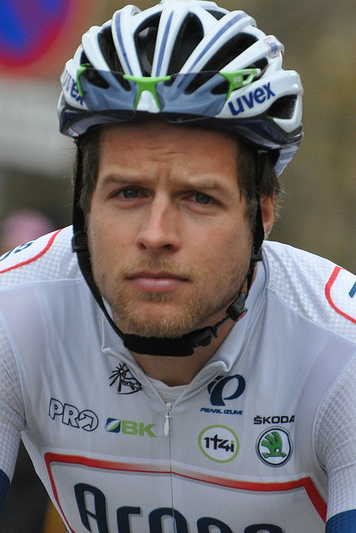
- De Backer in 2013.

Personal information
- Full name: Bert De Backer
- Born: 2 April 1984 (age 42) Eeklo, Belgium
- Height: 1.83 m (6 ft 0 in)
- Weight: 79 kg (174 lb)

Cycling career
- Sport: Cycling
- Current team: Retired
- Discipline: Road
- Role: Rider
- Rider type: Classics

Amateur teams
- 2002: Mez Team Belgium
- 2004: Palmans Collstrop Davo
- 2005: TW Classics All Bikes
- 2007–2008: Quick-Step–Beveren 2000
- 2007: Navigators Insurance (stagiaire)
- 2008: Skil–Shimano (stagiaire)

Professional teams
- 2009–2017: Skil–Shimano
- 2018–2021: Vital Concept

Bert De Backer (born 2 April 1984) is a Belgian former professional road cyclist.

== Major results ==
2002
3rd Omloop Het Nieuwsblad Juniors
2007
6th Vlaamse Havenpijl
2008
1st Gullegem Koerse
6th Circuit de Wallonie
8th Omloop van het Houtland
2010
7th Schaal Sels
7th Grand Prix d'Isbergues
2011
1st Sprints classification, Three Days of De Panne
2012
10th Kampioenschap van Vlaanderen
2013
1st Grote Prijs Jef Scherens
2014
6th Nationale Sluitingsprijs
2019
8th Paris–Tours
10th Paris–Bourges
2020
10th Dwars door het Hageland

=== Grand Tour general classification results timeline ===
Grand Tour	2013	2014	2015	2016
Giro d'Italia	157	133	158	DNF
Tour de France	—	—	—	—
Vuelta a España	—	—	—	—

Legend
—	Did not compete
DNF	Did not finish
