= Stijn Vandenbergh =

Belgian road bicycle racer

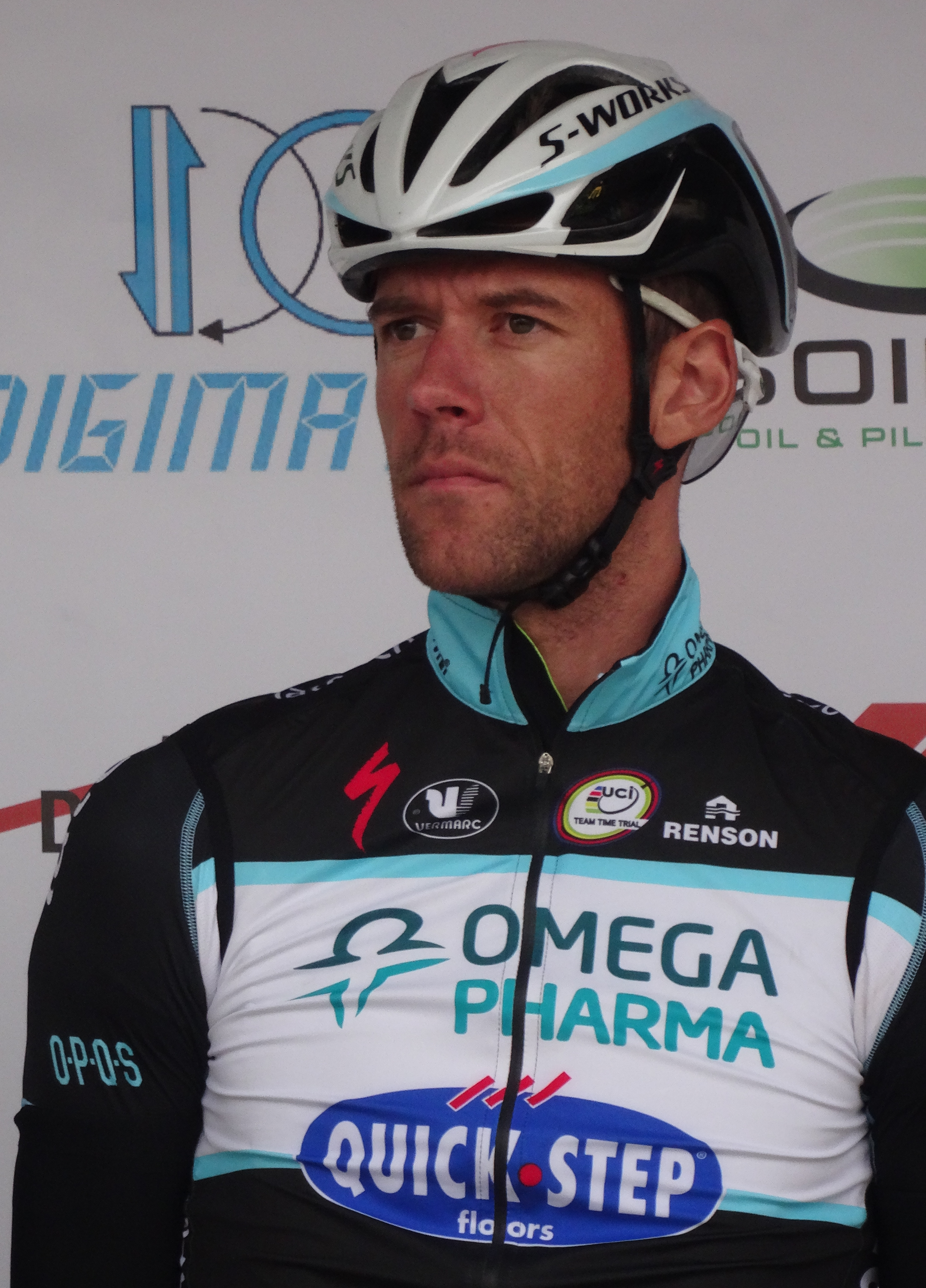
- Vandenbergh in 2014

Personal information
- Full name: Stijn Vandenbergh
- Nickname: VDB
- Born: 25 April 1984 (age 42) Oudenaarde, Belgium
- Height: 1.99 m (6 ft 6 in)
- Weight: 85 kg (187 lb)

Cycling career
- Sport: Cycling
- Current team: Retired
- Discipline: Road
- Role: Rider
- Rider type: Classics specialist

Amateur teams
- 2004: Onder Ons Parike
- 2005: Amuzza.com
- 2006: Unibet.com Davo
- 2006: Unibet.com (stagiaire)

Professional teams
- 2007: Unibet.com
- 2008: Ag2r–La Mondiale
- 2009–2011: Team Katusha
- 2012–2016: Omega Pharma–Quick-Step
- 2017–2020: AG2R La Mondiale

Stijn Vandenbergh (born 25 April 1984) is a Belgian former professional road racing cyclist, who rode professionally between 2007 and 2020 for the Unibet.com, Team Katusha, Etixx–Quick-Step and AG2R La Mondiale teams.

Born in Oudenaarde, Vandenbergh, as a first year professional, won the first stage and held the yellow jersey to the win of the Tour of Ireland.

== Major results ==
2004
1st Omloop Het Volk U23
10th Internationale Wielertrofee Jong Maar Moedig
10th Ronde van Vlaanderen U23
2006
3rd Internationale Wielertrofee Jong Maar Moedig
2007
1st Overall Tour of Ireland

1st Young rider classification
1st Stage 1

9th Grand Prix of Aargau Canton
10th Kampioenschap van Vlaanderen
2008
9th Grand Prix de Denain
2009
2nd Grote Prijs Jef Scherens
2010
9th Dwars door Vlaanderen
2013
2nd Omloop Het Nieuwsblad
8th Gent–Wevelgem
10th Dwars door Vlaanderen
2014
4th E3 Harelbeke
4th Tour of Flanders
5th Kuurne–Brussels–Kuurne
8th Overall Tour of Qatar
2015
4th Gent–Wevelgem
4th Omloop Het Nieuwsblad
7th Le Samyn
2016
1st Stage 5 Volta a la Comunitat Valenciana
1st Stage 1 (TTT) Tour de San Luis
3rd Overall Tour of Belgium
2018
10th Tro-Bro Léon
2019
5th Overall Boucles de la Mayenne
6th Le Samyn
