= Jens Debusschere =

Belgian road cyclist (born 1989)

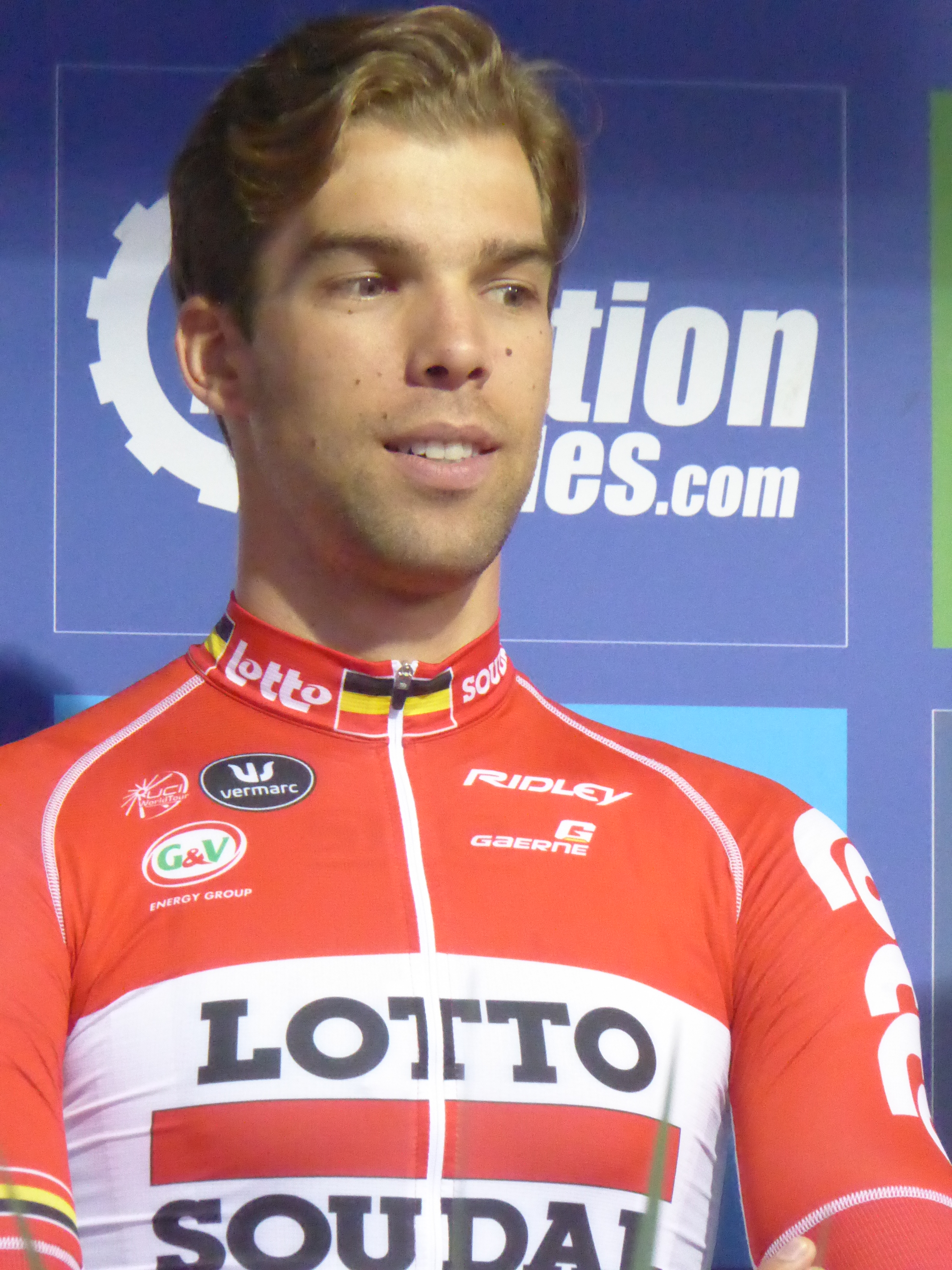
- Debusschere in 2016

Personal information
- Full name: Jens Debusschere
- Nickname: Jenske
- Born: 28 August 1989 (age 37) Roeselare, Belgium
- Height: 1.83 m (6 ft 0 in)
- Weight: 78 kg (172 lb; 12 st 4 lb)

Cycling career
- Sport: Cycling
- Current team: Retired
- Discipline: Road
- Role: Rider
- Rider type: Sprinter; Classics specialist

Amateur teams
- 2009–2010: PWS–Eijssen Cycling Team
- 2009: Topsport Vlaanderen–Mercator (stagiaire)
- 2010: Omega Pharma–Lotto (stagiaire)
- 2023: Yaro–Belisol

Professional teams
- 2011–2018: Omega Pharma–Lotto
- 2019: Team Katusha–Alpecin
- 2020–2022: B&B Hotels–Vital Concept

Major wins
- One-day races and Classics National Road Race Championships (2014) Dwars door Vlaanderen (2016)

Jens Debusschere (born 28 August 1989) is a Belgian former professional road bicycle racer, who rode professionally between 2011 and 2022 for the Lotto–Soudal, Team Katusha–Alpecin and B&B Hotels–KTM teams. During his professional career, Debusschere took 15 victories, including victories at the Belgian National Road Race Championships in 2014 and the 2016 Dwars door Vlaanderen.

== Major results ==
2007
1st Road race, National Junior Road Championships
2nd Paris–Roubaix Juniors
2008
8th Grand Prix de Waregem
2009
9th Grote 1-MeiPrijs
2010
2nd De Vlaamse Pijl
2nd Paris–Roubaix Espoirs
3rd Kattekoers
6th Overall Le Triptyque des Monts et Châteaux
2011
5th Overall Herald Sun Tour
2012
8th Omloop van het Houtland
2013 (4 pro wins)
1st Overall Tour de l'Eurométropole

1st Points classification
1st Young rider classification
1st Stage 1

1st Kampioenschap van Vlaanderen
1st Nationale Sluitingsprijs
3rd Omloop van het Houtland
5th Binche–Chimay–Binche
2014 (3)
1st Road race, National Road Championships
1st Nationale Sluitingsprijs
1st Stage 1 Tour de Wallonie
2nd Overall Tour de l'Eurométropole
2nd Trofeo Palma
3rd Binche–Chimay–Binche
3rd Paris–Tours
6th Dwars door Vlaanderen
6th Ronde van Limburg
9th Omloop van het Houtland
2015 (4)
1st Grand Prix de Wallonie
1st Omloop van het Houtland
1st Stage 2 Tirreno–Adriatico
1st Stage 1 Tour de l'Eurométropole
3rd Nationale Sluitingsprijs
5th Gent–Wevelgem
5th Ronde van Limburg
6th Kampioenschap van Vlaanderen
7th Overall Ster ZLM Toer
7th Kuurne–Brussels–Kuurne
8th Dwars door Vlaanderen
9th Paris–Roubaix
2016 (1)
1st Dwars door Vlaanderen
4th Overall Tour de Picardie
4th London–Surrey Classic
6th Omloop Het Nieuwsblad
7th Binche–Chimay–Binche
8th Eurométropole
8th Paris–Tours
2017 (2)
Tour of Belgium

1st Points classification
1st Stage 5

1st Stage 1 Four Days of Dunkirk
3rd Clásica de Almería
7th Gent–Wevelgem
7th Dwars door West-Vlaanderen
8th Halle–Ingooigem
2018 (1)
1st Stage 5 Tour de Wallonie
4th Scheldeprijs
4th Grote Prijs Jef Scherens
5th Gent–Wevelgem
5th Three Days of Bruges–De Panne
6th Tacx Pro Classic
10th Paris–Roubaix
2019
5th Cadel Evans Great Ocean Road Race
9th Nokere Koerse
10th Gent–Wevelgem
2021
5th Heistse Pijl
6th Egmont Cycling Race
10th Grand Prix de Denain

=== Grand Tour general classification results timeline ===
Grand Tour	2012	2013	2014	2015	2016	2017	2018	2019	2020
Giro d'Italia	—	—	—	—	—	—	136	—	—
Tour de France	—	—	—	145	DNF	—	—	153	DNF
Vuelta a España	DNF	—	107	—	—	DNF	—	—	—

=== Classics results timeline ===
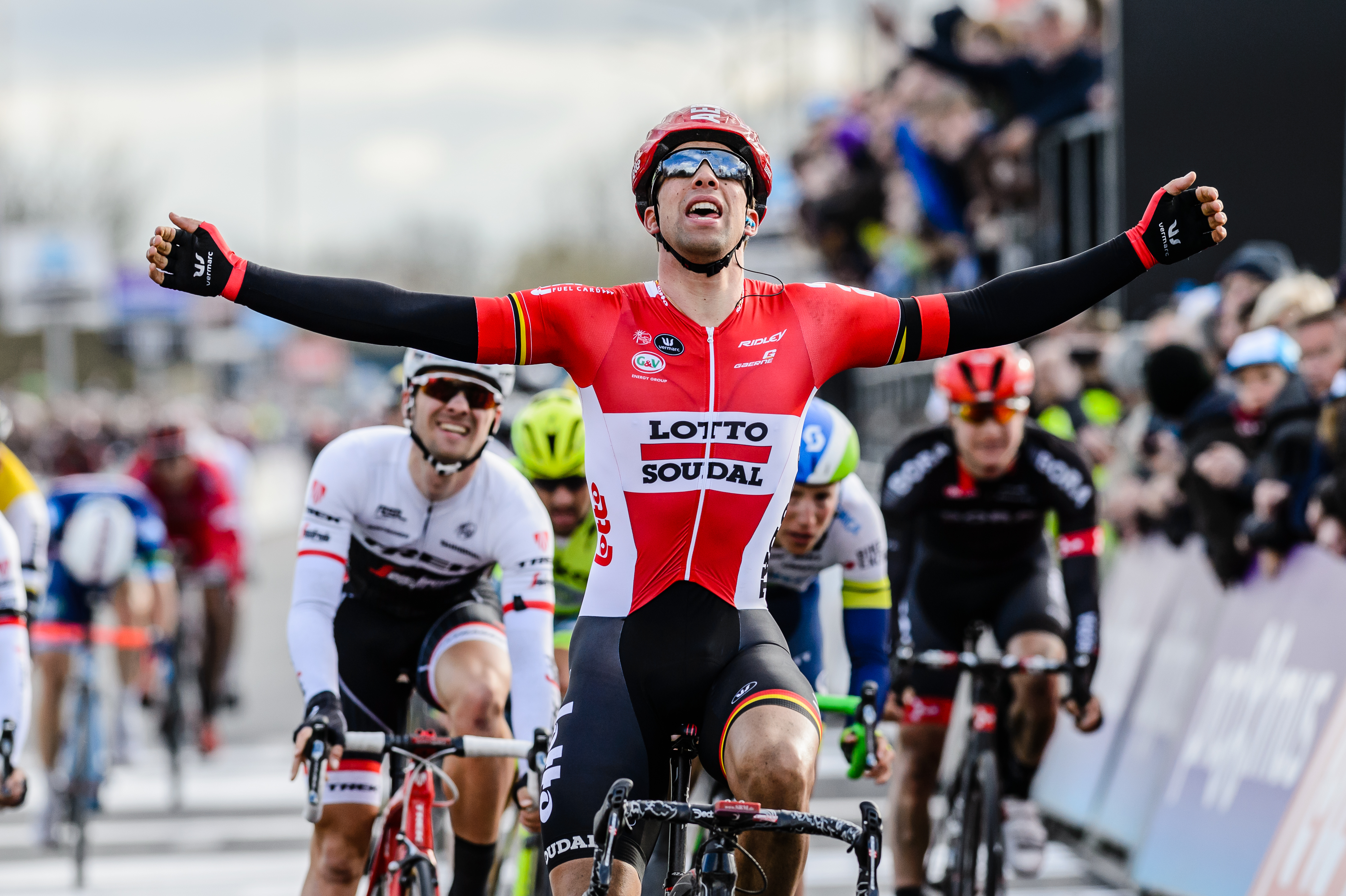
Debusschere celebrates his victory in the 2016 Dwars door Vlaanderen

Monument	2011	2012	2013	2014	2015	2016	2017	2018	2019	2020	2021	2022
Milan–San Remo	—	—	—	—	—	35	132	22	—	—	—	—
Tour of Flanders	—	70	27	DNF	25	—	DNF	61	35	DNF	DNF	—
Paris–Roubaix	DNF	DNF	DNF	75	9	—	78	10	DNF	NH	DNF	—
Liège–Bastogne–Liège	Did not contest during his career											
Giro di Lombardia	Did not contest during his career											
Classic	2011	2012	2013	2014	2015	2016	2017	2018	2019	2020	2021	2022
Omloop Het Nieuwsblad	—	47	100	58	12	6	DNF	—	72	—	117	—
Kuurne–Brussels–Kuurne	—	115	NH	55	7	20	—	15	15	120	DNF	—
E3 Harelbeke	105	DNF	81	DNF	—	—	—	—	—	NH	—	DNF
Gent–Wevelgem	—	—	62	122	5	DNF	7	5	10	37	57	DNF
Dwars door Vlaanderen	—	24	DNF	6	8	1	78	DNF	68	NH	DNF	DNF
Scheldeprijs	—	78	—	—	—	—	—	4	55	69	—	—
Paris–Tours	—	22	43	3	94	8	130	71	DNF	—	—	—

Legend
—	Did not compete
DNF	Did not finish
NH	Not held
