= 2015 Dwars door Vlaanderen =

- Event poster with previous winner Niki Terpstra

Race details
- Dates: 25 March 2015
- Distance: 200.2 km (124.4 mi)
- Winning time: 4h 35' 59"

Results
	Winner	Jelle Wallays (BEL)	(Topsport Vlaanderen–Baloise)
	Second	Edward Theuns (BEL)	(Topsport Vlaanderen–Baloise})
	Third	Dylan van Baarle (NED)	(Cannondale–Garmin)

The 2015 Dwars door Vlaanderen (English: Across Flanders) was the 70th edition of the Dwars door Vlaanderen cycling one-day classic, which took place on 25 March 2015 and was rated as a 1.HC event as part of the 2015 UCI Europe Tour. The race was 200.2 kilometres (124.4 miles) in length. It was organised as part of the Flanders Classics organisation.

The 2014 winner was Niki Terpstra (Omega Pharma–Quick-Step), who won the race in a solo breakaway. He was the favourite for the 2015 race and raced as part of a strong Etixx–Quick-Step team in 2015. The team also included world champion Michał Kwiatkowski, former world champion Mark Cavendish and Iljo Keisse. Other favourites included Lars Boom (Astana), Stijn Devolder, Gert Steegmans (both Trek Factory Racing) and former winners Matti Breschel (Tinkoff–Saxo) and Oscar Gatto (Androni Giocattoli), as well as a large number of other riders. The race was also notable for the presence of Nairo Quintana (Movistar Team), racing on the cobblestones for the first time in his career as part of his preparation for cobbled stages in the 2015 Tour de France.

The first part of the race was generally flat, but it became more hilly towards the end of the race. It included 12 major climbs, five of them cobbled, and three flat sections of cobbled roads. The race included several of the climbs used in the Tour of Flanders, which took place the following week, such as the Oude Kwaremont and the Paterberg.

The race was won by Jelle Wallays (Topsport Vlaanderen–Baloise). He was part of the main breakaway of the day, escaping early on in the race. The breakaway was closed down early, having only 20 seconds' lead with 80 kilometres (50 miles) to race. Wallays attacked, initially alongside Gert Dockx (Lotto–Soudal) and then alone, and built a lead of nearly a minute. On the Taaienberg, with 56 kilometres (35 miles) remaining, Kwiatkowski, Edward Theuns (Topsport Vlaanderen–Baloise) and Dylan van Baarle (Cannondale–Garmin) attacked from the first chasing group. They quickly caught Wallays and created a lead group of four riders. They built a lead of 40 seconds thanks to Kwiatkowski's efforts on the Oude Kwaremont; Boom attempted to counter-attack, but he crashed into a field. The chase group was unorganised and failed to catch the leading four riders. With 1 kilometre (0.62 miles) remaining, Wallays made another attack. Since Theuns was Wallays' teammate, Kwiatkowski and van Baarle had the task of catching him. They both looked to the other to do the work to catch Wallays and ended up leading out Theuns to give Topsport Vlaanderen–Baloise the first two positions on the podium. After the race, Kwiatkowski and van Baarle blamed each other for their failure to win the race.

== Categorised sections ==
=== Climbs ===
Name		Distance from start
Nieuwe Kwaremont		88 kilometres (55 miles)
Kettenberg	cobbled	107 kilometres (66 miles)
Leberg		116 kilometres (72 miles)
Berendries		120 kilometres (75 miles)
Valkenberg		125 kilometres (78 miles)
Eikenberg		140 kilometres (87 miles)
Taaienberg	cobbled	144 kilometres (89 miles)
Oude Kwaremont	cobbled	162 kilometres (101 miles)
Paterberg	cobbled	165 kilometres (103 miles)
Hellestraat		181 kilometres (112 miles)
Holstraat		185 kilometres (115 miles)
Nokereberg	cobbled	192 kilometres (119 miles)

=== Flat cobbled sections ===
Name	Distance from start
Holleweg	108 kilometres (67 miles)
Haaghoek	113 kilometres (70 miles)
Varentstraat	171 kilometres (106 miles)

== Results ==
Result
Rank	Rider	Team	Time
1	Jelle Wallays (BEL)	Topsport Vlaanderen–Baloise	4h 35' 59"
2	Edward Theuns (BEL)	Topsport Vlaanderen–Baloise	+ 2"
3	Dylan van Baarle (NED)	Cannondale–Garmin	+ 2"
4	Michał Kwiatkowski (POL)	Etixx–Quick-Step	+ 4"
5	Guillaume Van Keirsbulck (BEL)	Etixx–Quick-Step	+ 1' 20"
6	Tiesj Benoot (BEL)	Lotto–Soudal	+ 1' 29"
7	Cyril Lemoine (FRA)	Cofidis	+ 1' 29"
8	Jens Debusschere (BEL)	Lotto–Soudal	+ 1' 29"
9	Nikolas Maes (BEL)	Etixx–Quick-Step	+ 1' 29"
10	Alexey Tsatevich (RUS)	Team Katusha	+ 1' 29"
