= 2018 Paris–Roubaix =

Cycling race

2018 UCI World Tour, race 15 of 37
- Event poster with previous winner Greg Van Avermaet

Race details
- Dates: 8 April 2018
- Stages: 1
- Distance: 257 km (159.7 mi)
- Winning time: 5h 54' 06"

Results
	Winner	Peter Sagan (SVK)	(Bora–Hansgrohe)
	Second	Silvan Dillier (SUI)	(AG2R La Mondiale)
	Third	Niki Terpstra (NED)	(Quick-Step Floors)

The 2018 Paris–Roubaix was a road cycling one-day race that took place on 8 April 2018 in France. It was the 116th edition of the Paris–Roubaix and the fifteenth event of the 2018 UCI World Tour.

For the first time since Bernard Hinault in 1981, the race was won by the incumbent world champion, Peter Sagan (Bora–Hansgrohe). Sagan attacked the main group of riders, on sector 12 of pavé between Auchy-lez-Orchies and Bersée, catching the head of the race not long after. Only Swiss champion Silvan Dillier, riding for the AG2R La Mondiale team, was able to stay with Sagan all the way to the finish at Roubaix Velodrome, where Sagan won the two-up sprint finish. Third place, 57 seconds later, went to Tour of Flanders winner Niki Terpstra, for Quick-Step Floors.

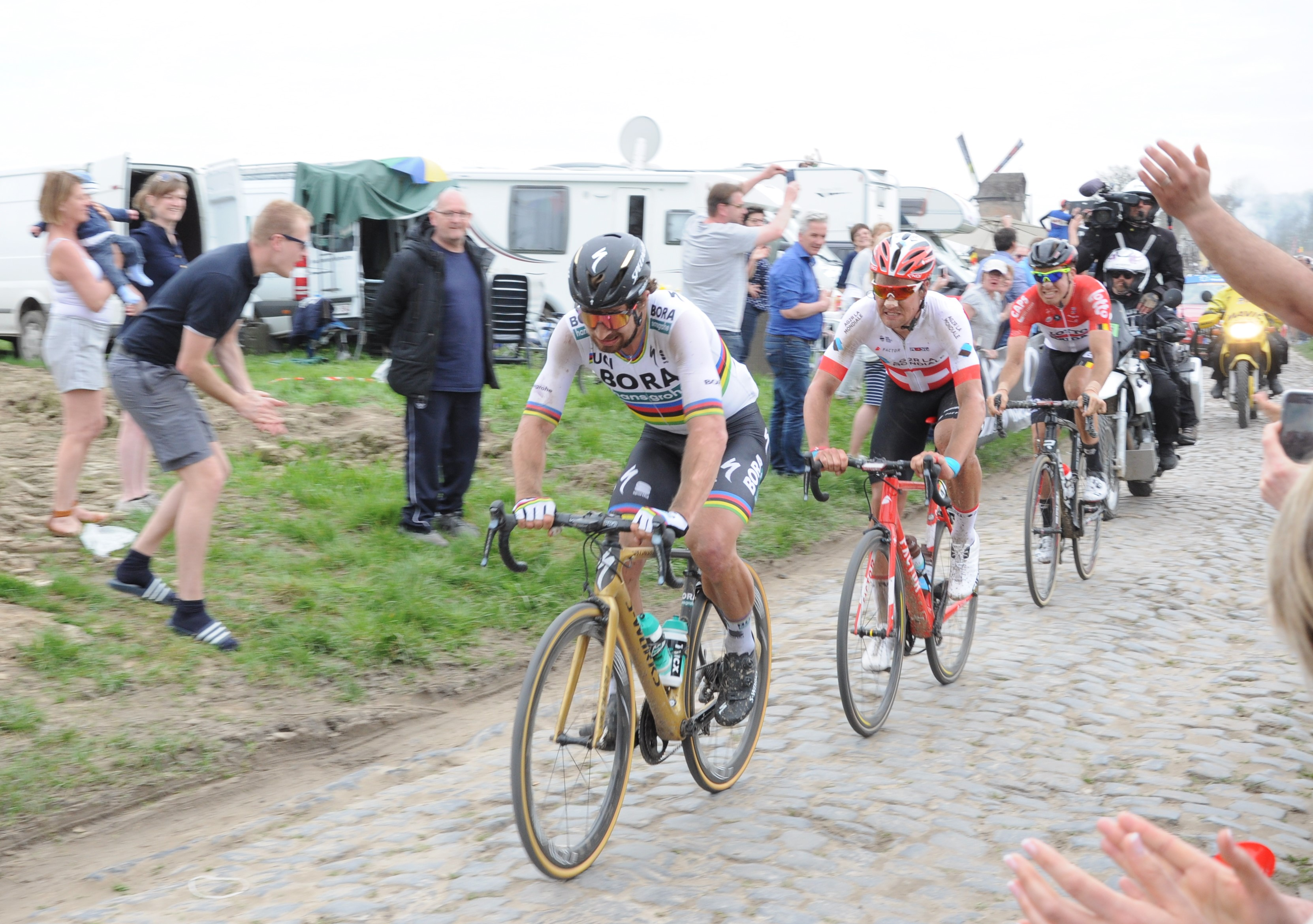
Peter Sagan, Silvan Dillier and Jelle Wallays at the Templeuve-en-Pévèle pavé sector, 35 kilometres (22 miles) from the finish

The race was marred by the death of Vérandas Willems–Crelan rider Michael Goolaerts. During the race, he suffered a cardiac arrest, and later died in hospital in Lille.

== Teams ==
As Paris–Roubaix was a UCI World Tour event, all eighteen UCI WorldTeams were invited automatically and obliged to enter a team in the race. Seven UCI Professional Continental teams competed, completing the 25-team peloton.

UCI WorldTeams

- AG2R La Mondiale
- Astana
- Bahrain–Merida
- BMC Racing Team
- Bora–Hansgrohe
- EF Education First–Drapac p/b Cannondale
- Team Dimension Data
- Team Katusha–Alpecin
- LottoNL–Jumbo
- Lotto–Soudal
- Movistar Team
- Mitchelton–Scott
- Quick-Step Floors
- Team Sky
- Team Sunweb
- Trek–Segafredo
- UAE Team Emirates
- Groupama–FDJ

UCI Professional Continental teams

- Cofidis
- Delko–Marseille Provence KTM
- Direct Énergie
- Fortuneo–Samsic
- Vérandas Willems–Crelan
- Vital Concept
- WB Aqua Protect Veranclassic

== Result ==
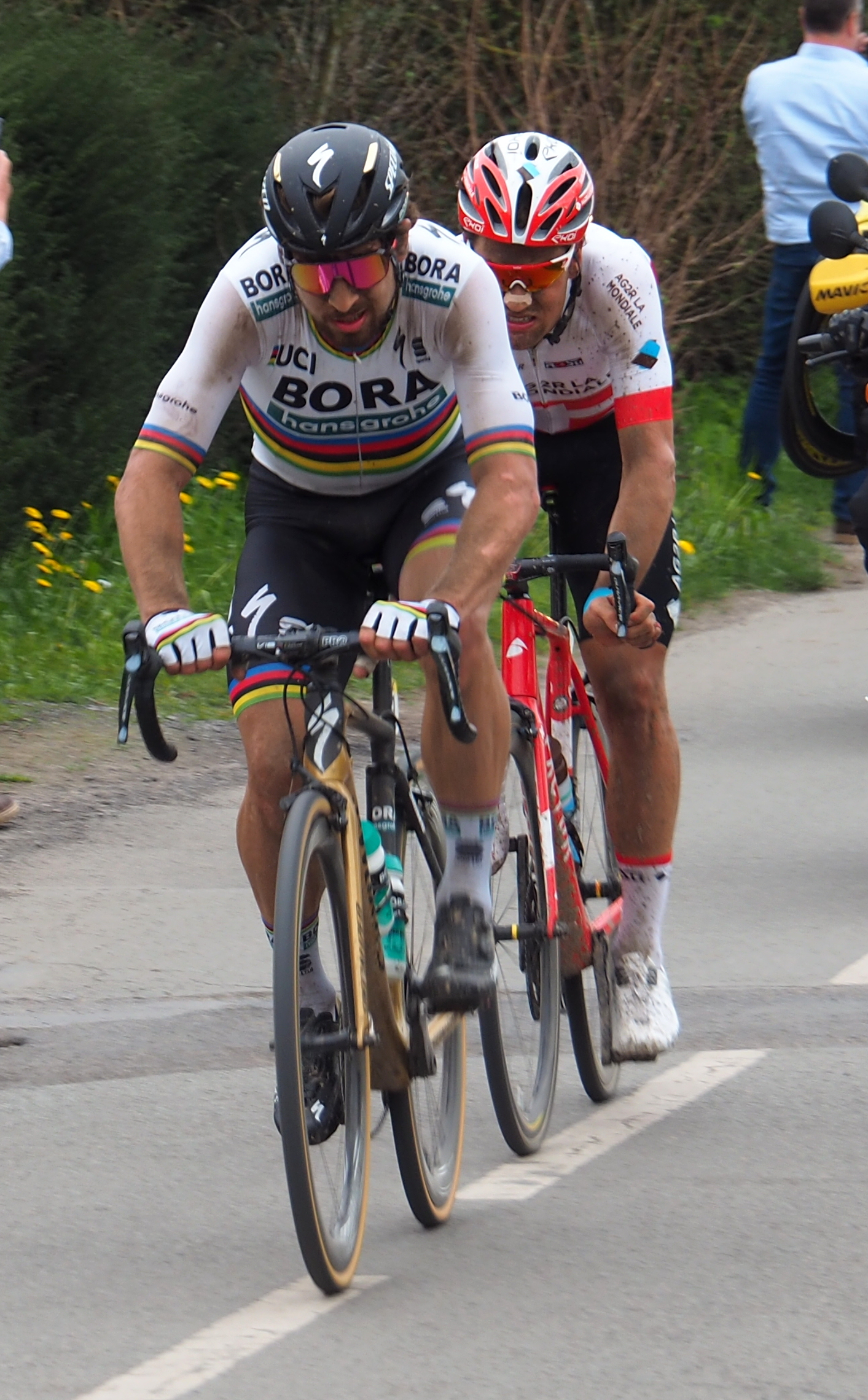
Peter Sagan (Bora–Hansgrohe) leads Silvan Dillier (AG2R La Mondiale) in Willems, 8 kilometres (5.0 miles) from the finish of the race.

Result
Rank	Rider	Team	Time
1	Peter Sagan (SVK)	Bora–Hansgrohe	5h 54' 06"
2	Silvan Dillier (SUI)	AG2R La Mondiale	+ 0"
3	Niki Terpstra (NED)	Quick-Step Floors	+ 57"
4	Greg Van Avermaet (BEL)	BMC Racing Team	+ 1' 34"
5	Jasper Stuyven (BEL)	Trek–Segafredo	+ 1' 34"
6	Sep Vanmarcke (BEL)	EF Education First–Drapac p/b Cannondale	+ 1' 34"
7	Nils Politt (GER)	Team Katusha–Alpecin	+ 2' 31"
8	Taylor Phinney (USA)	EF Education First–Drapac p/b Cannondale	+ 2' 31"
9	Zdeněk Štybar (CZE)	Quick-Step Floors	+ 2' 31"
10	Jens Debusschere (BEL)	Lotto–Soudal	+ 2' 31"
