= Niki Terpstra =

Racing cyclist

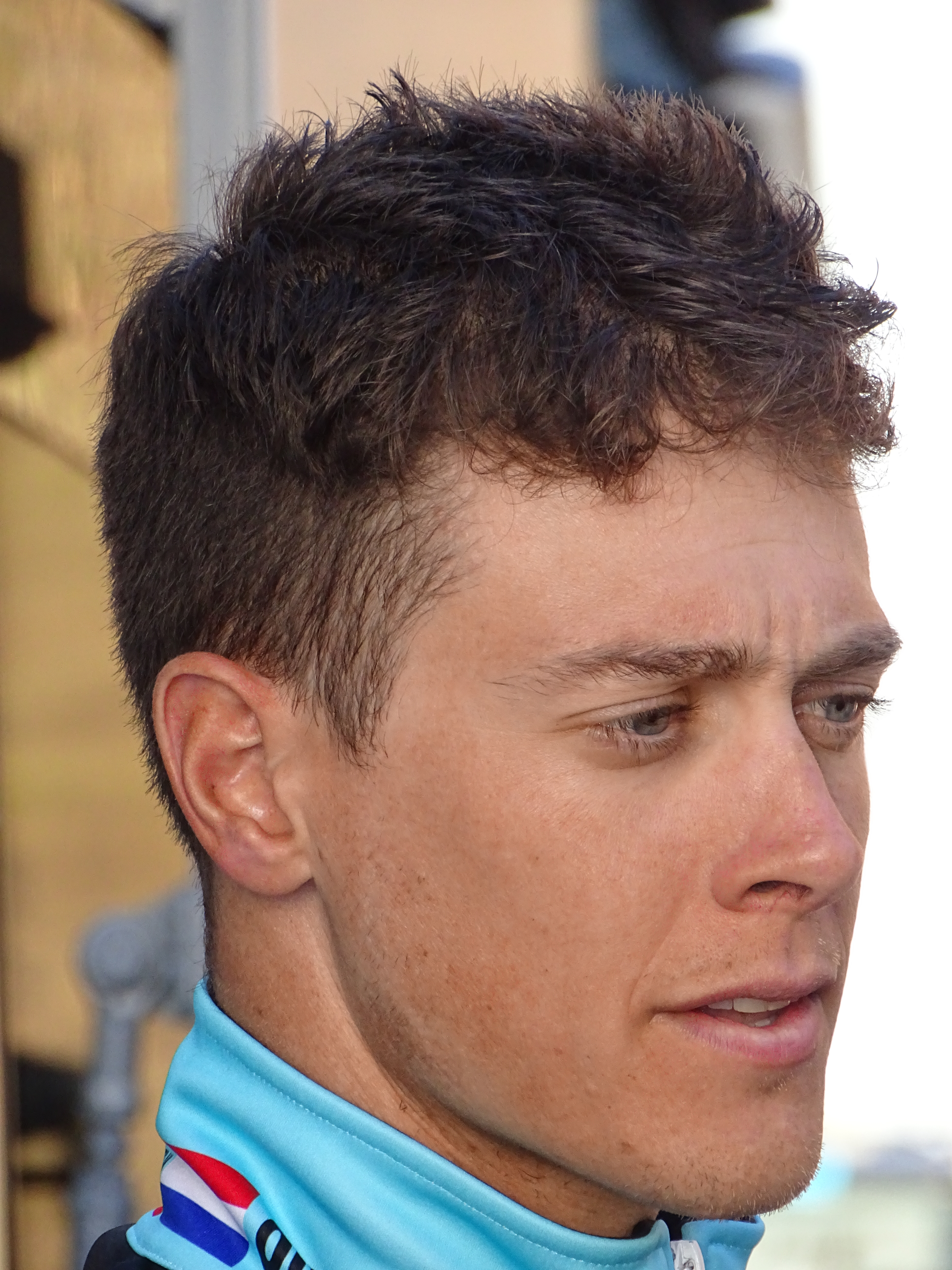
- Terpstra at the 2015 E3 Harelbeke.

Personal information
- Full name: Niki Terpstra
- Born: 18 May 1984 (age 42) Beverwijk, the Netherlands
- Height: 1.90 m (6 ft 3 in)
- Weight: 75 kg (165 lb; 11 st 11 lb)

Cycling career
- Sport: Cycling
- Disciplines: Road; Track
- Role: Rider
- Rider type: Classics specialist

Professional teams
- 2003–2004: Bert Story–Piels
- 2005: AXA
- 2006: Ubbink–Syntec
- 2007–2010: Team Milram
- 2011–2018: Quick-Step
- 2019–2022: Direct Énergie

Major wins
- Stage races Tour of Qatar (2014, 2015) Tour de Wallonie (2015) Eneco Tour (2016) Single-day races and Classics National Road Race Championships (2010, 2012, 2015) Paris–Roubaix (2014) Tour of Flanders (2018) E3 Harelbeke (2018) Dwars door Vlaanderen (2012, 2014)
Medal record
Men's road bicycle racing
Representing Omega Pharma–Quick-Step (2012–2014) Etixx–Quick-Step (2015–2016)
World Championships
Gold medal – first place	2012 Valkenburg	Team time trial
Gold medal – first place	2013 Florence	Team time trial
Gold medal – first place	2016 Doha	Team time trial
Gold medal – first place	2018 Innsbruck	Team time trial
Silver medal – second place	2015 Richmond	Team time trial
Bronze medal – third place	2014 Ponferrada	Team time trial
Men's track cycling
Representing Netherlands
UCI Track Cycling World Championships
Silver medal – second place	2005 Los Angeles	Team pursuit

Niki Terpstra (Dutch pronunciation: [ˈnɪki ˈtɛr(ə)pstraː]; born 18 May 1984) is a Dutch former racing cyclist, who rode professionally between 2003 and 2022 for six different teams. He is the brother of fellow racing cyclist Mike Terpstra. He is the third Dutch cyclist to have won both of the cobbled Monument spring classics, Paris–Roubaix and the Tour of Flanders, after Jan Raas and Hennie Kuiper.

== Career ==
=== Early life and career ===
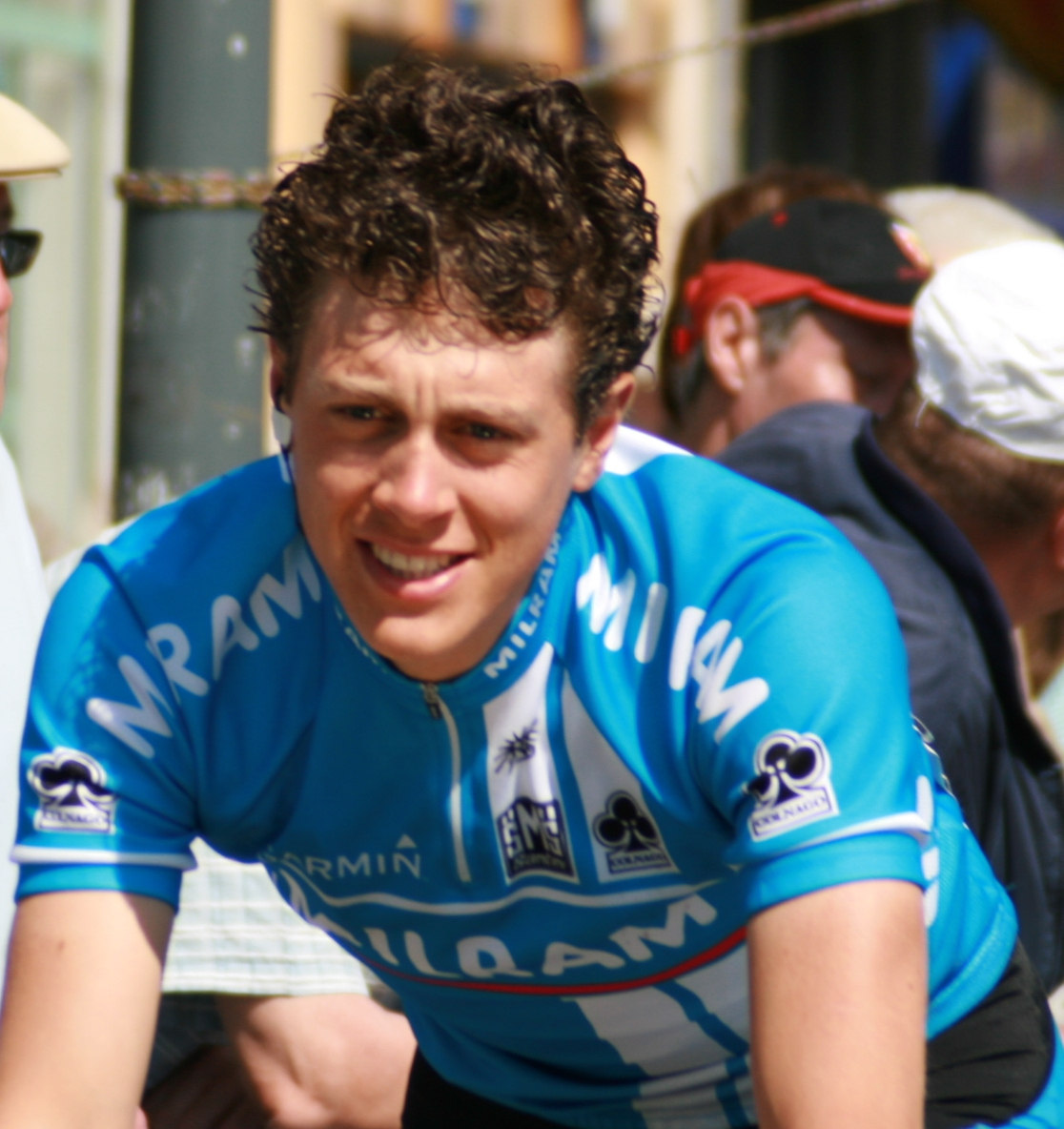
Terpstra in 2008

Niki Terpstra was born on 18 May 1984 in Beverwijk in the Netherlands.

He was part of the silver medal-winning team in the team pursuit in the 2005 UCI Track Cycling World Championships, together with Levi Heimans, Jens Mouris and Peter Schep. With a 4th place in the Three Days of De Panne followed by a 14th place at the 2008 Tour of Flanders, young Terpstra showed signs of considerable talent.

Between 2007 and 2010, Terpstra rode for the German Team Milram. In 2009 Terpstra won the 3rd stage in the Critérium du Dauphiné Libéré, gaining the yellow leader jersey at the same time, keeping it for a day.

=== Quick-Step (2011–2018) ===
==== 2011–2014 ====
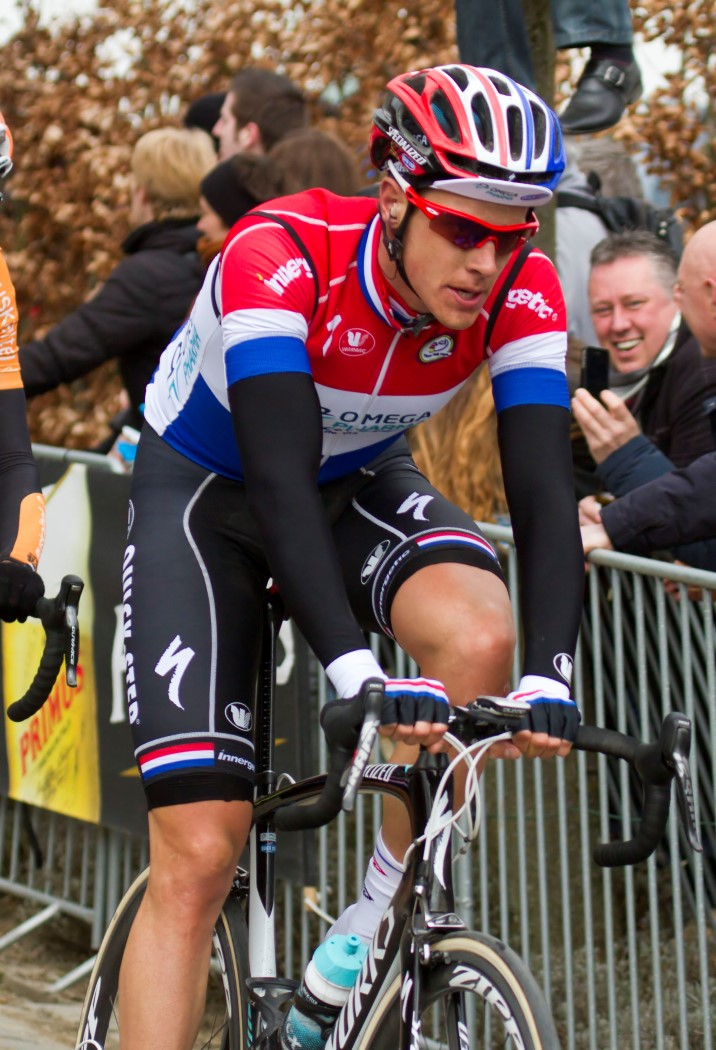
Terpstra at the 2013 Tour of Flanders

In 2011, Terpstra joined the Belgian UCI World Tour Quick-Step team.

In 2012, Terpstra took a prestigious victory at the Dwars door Vlaanderen, winning in solo fashion after being on the attack all day. He detached himself from the break on the Oude Kwaremont with Jelle Wallays of Topsport Vlaanderen–Mercator. He dropped Wallays on the Paterberg and finished the race with an advantage of 47 seconds over Frenchman Sylvain Chavanel.

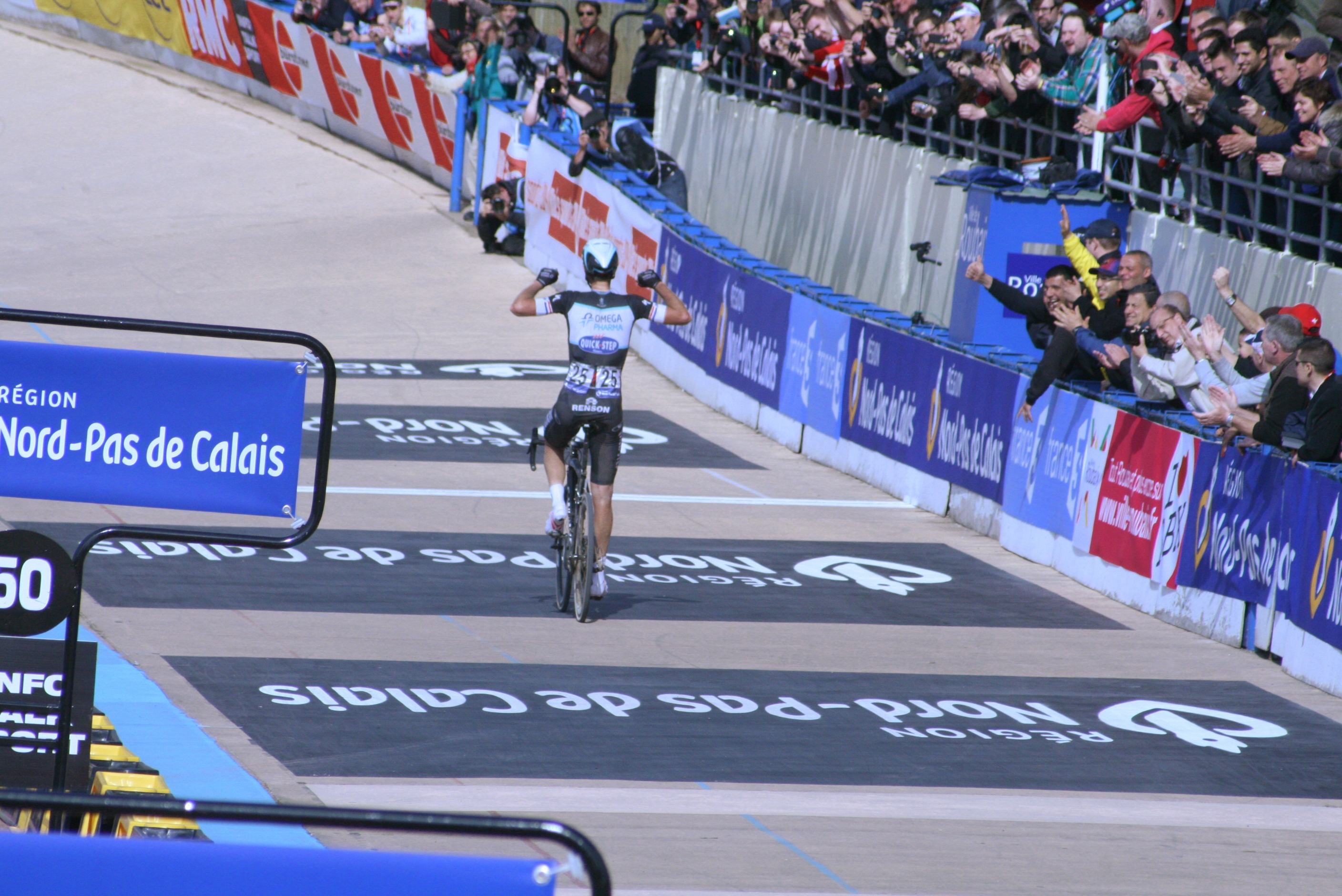
Terpstra crossing the line at the Roubaix Velodrome to win the 2014 Paris–Roubaix.

In 2014 he won his first short stage race with the victory in the Tour of Qatar. Terpstra continued his good form in the classics, placing fifth in Omloop Het Nieuwsblad, winning the Dwars door Vlaanderen for the second time in his career, and placing sixth in the Tour of Flanders. On 13 April 2014 he won the Paris–Roubaix race in solo fashion, after attacking from the leading group of 11 riders with 6 kilometres (3.7 miles) remaining.

==== 2015 ====
In 2015, Terpstra defended his Tour of Qatar title, holding the race lead after winning the individual time trial on Stage 3. At Omloop Het Nieuwsblad, Terpstra made the decisive breakaway of four riders with teammates Tom Boonen and Stijn Vandenbergh, along with Ian Stannard (Team Sky). After Stannard closed down a Boonen attack in the closing stages Terpstra tried to counterattack, but Vandenbergh closed the gap, allowing Stannard to attack with only Terpstra able to follow. Stannard went on to beat Terpstra in the sprint finish. In March Terpstra had some success, first by getting the second position in the Ronde van Zeeland Seaports. He then got on the second step of the podium of a very windy Gent–Wevelgem, as he won the two-man sprint for second position after Luca Paolini had crossed the line solo. In his next race, the Tour of Flanders, he broke away from the peloton with Alexander Kristoff 30 kilometres (19 miles) from the finish but could not beat Kristoff in the final sprint, completing the race in second place. In June, he won the Dutch National Road Race Championships in a bunch sprint, surprising the pure sprinters.

==== 2016 ====
In 2016, Terpstra won the Eneco Tour after a dramatic rain-swept final stage that saw former race leader Rohan Dennis (BMC Racing Team) crash out. The stage featured cobbles and bergs used in the Classics first saw Dennis lose time, and then drop out completely due to his injuries. Terpstra, who started the final stage in fifth place overall, formed part of a front group of three riders and finished second behind stage winner Edvald Boasson Hagen (Team Dimension Data).

==== 2018 ====
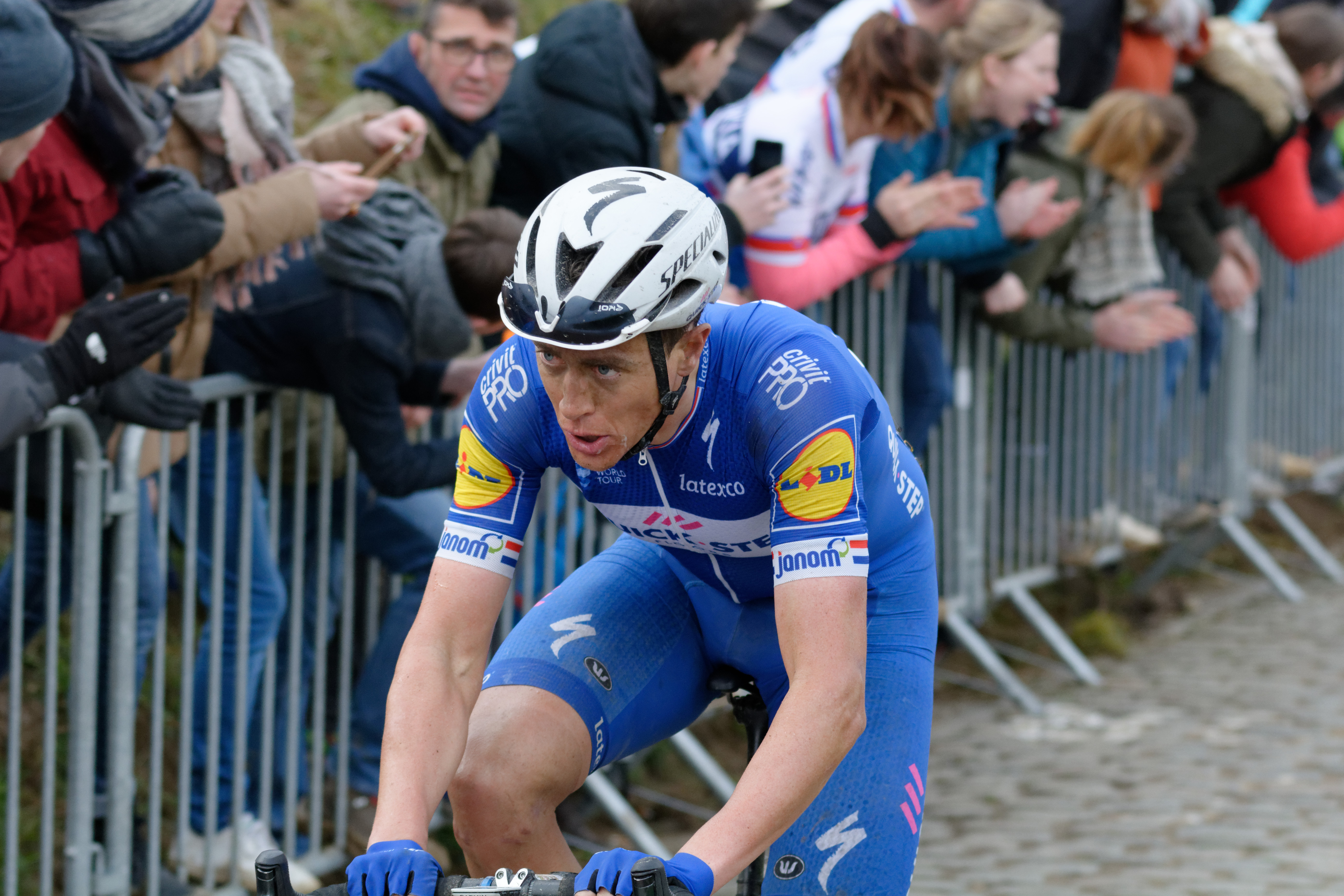
Terpstra at the 2018 Tour of Flanders

In 2018, Terpstra won E3 Harelbeke, soloing to the line after initially attacking on the Taaienberg with teammate Yves Lampaert with more than 70 kilometres (43 miles) remaining. Terpstra finished 20 seconds clear of an elite group, led home by his team-mate Philippe Gilbert, and he became the first Dutchman to win E3 Harelbeke since Steven de Jongh in 2003. Terpstra won the Tour of Flanders with a late solo attack. After following an attack by Vincenzo Nibali (Bahrain–Merida) over the Kruisberg climb, Terpstra dropped the Italian soon after, then caught and quickly dispatched a trio of riders from an earlier breakaway on the final climb of the Oude Kwaremont. Terpstra remained clear over the remaining 25 kilometres (16 miles), finishing 12 seconds ahead of Trek–Segafredo's Mads Pedersen from the earlier breakaway, and by teammate and defending race-winner Gilbert who led the bunch home in third. It was his second 'Monument' victory and he became the first Dutch rider since Adri van der Poel in 1986 to win the Tour of Flanders. The following week, Terpstra claimed third place at Paris–Roubaix, leading home a group 57 seconds behind winner Peter Sagan (Bora–Hansgrohe) and Silvan Dillier (AG2R La Mondiale).

=== Direct Énergie (2019–2022) ===
In 2019, Terpstra joined French team Direct Énergie.

On 16 June 2020, Terpstra was involved in a crash in the Netherlands. While motor-pacing, he was forced to avoid hitting a pack of geese at high speed, hitting a rock and falling to the ground. He was initially ruled out of racing for three months, but returned to racing at August's Tour de Wallonie.

In September 2022 Terpstra announced his retirement from professional road racing.

== Personal life ==
He is the second cousin of cyclist Yuli van der Molen. In 2021, Terpstra launched his own casual clothing line, Speed On Wheels, together with Futurum.

== Major results ==
=== Gravel ===
2023
UCI World Series

1st Halmstad

1st Meerveld
2024
2nd Hico, Texas

=== Road ===
2004
1st GP Wielerrevue
1st Stage 2 Ronde van Midden-Brabant
2005
1st Omloop der Kempen
2006 (1 pro win)
1st Overall OZ Wielerweekend

1st Points classification
1st Stage 2 (ITT)

1st Ronde van Midden-Nederland
1st Stage 4 Tour of Belgium
1st Stage 6 Tour de Normandie
2nd Ronde van Overijssel
3rd Time trial, National Under-23 Championships
3rd Colliers Classic
2007
1st Mountains classification, Deutschland Tour
3rd Hel van het Mergelland
2008
3rd Overall Bayern Rundfahrt
4th Overall Three Days of De Panne
5th Dutch Food Valley Classic
Combativity award Stage 13 Tour de France
2009 (2)
1st Ridderronde Maastricht
1st Stage 3 Critérium du Dauphiné Libéré
2nd Overall Ster Elektrotoer

1st Prologue

9th Omloop Het Nieuwsblad
2010 (2)
National Championships

1st Road race
5th Time trial

1st Sparkassen Giro Bochum
3rd Dwars door Vlaanderen
6th Overall Tour of Oman
2011
2nd Overall Ster ZLM Toer
6th Overall Tour of Belgium
6th Omloop Het Nieuwsblad
10th Overall Tour of Beijing
Combativity award Stage 15 Tour de France
2012 (2)
1st Team time trial, UCI World Championships
National Championships

1st Road race
3rd Time trial

1st Dwars door Vlaanderen
1st Amstel Curaçao Race
3rd Overall Eneco Tour
3rd Paris–Tours
5th Overall Three Days of De Panne
5th Paris–Roubaix
6th Tour of Flanders
2013
1st Team time trial, UCI World Championships
1st Stage 1 (TTT) Tirreno–Adriatico
National Championships

2nd Time trial
5th Road race

3rd Overall Driedaagse van West-Vlaanderen
3rd Overall Three Days of De Panne
3rd Paris–Roubaix
6th Grand Prix Cycliste de Québec
9th Overall Tour of Belgium
10th Paris–Tours
2014 (4)
1st Overall Tour of Qatar

1st Stage 1

1st Paris–Roubaix
1st Dwars door Vlaanderen
1st Amstel Curaçao Race
2nd Road race, National Championships
2nd E3 Harelbeke
3rd Team time trial, UCI World Championships
4th Overall Three Days of De Panne
5th Omloop Het Nieuwsblad
6th Tour of Flanders
9th Overall Tour of Belgium
2015 (5)
1st Road race, National Championships
1st Overall Tour of Qatar

1st Stage 3 (ITT)

1st Overall Tour de Wallonie

1st Stage 1

2nd Team time trial, UCI World Championships
2nd Tour of Flanders
2nd Omloop Het Nieuwsblad
2nd Ronde van Zeeland Seaports
2nd Gent–Wevelgem
8th Road race, European Games
2016 (3)
UCI World Championships

1st Team time trial
9th Road race

1st Overall Eneco Tour
1st Le Samyn
1st Dwars door het Hageland
10th Overall Tour of Belgium
10th Tour of Flanders
2017
3rd Tour of Flanders
3rd Paris–Tours
4th Gent–Wevelgem
2018 (3)
1st Team time trial, UCI World Championships
1st Tour of Flanders
1st E3 Harelbeke
1st Le Samyn
1st Stage 1 (TTT) Adriatica Ionica Race
2nd Time trial, National Championships
2nd Paris–Tours
3rd Paris–Roubaix
9th Overall BinckBank Tour
9th Dwars door Vlaanderen
2019
2nd Dwars door het Hageland
2nd Paris–Tours
3rd Overall Tour Poitou-Charentes en Nouvelle-Aquitaine
3rd Kuurne–Brussels–Kuurne
3rd Le Samyn
3rd Circuit de Wallonie
4th Duo Normand (with Anthony Turgis)
5th Time trial, National Championships
7th Antwerp Port Epic
10th Chrono des Nations
10th Tour de Vendée

==== Grand Tour general classification results timeline ====
Grand Tour	2007	2008	2009	2010	2011	2012	2013	2014	2015	2016	2017	2018	2019	2020
Giro d'Italia	Did not contest during his career													
Tour de France	—	136	152	DNF	134	—	149	94	—	—	—	119	DNF	—
Vuelta a España	142	—	—	95	—	127	—	—	DNF	139	130	—	—	136

==== Classics results timeline ====
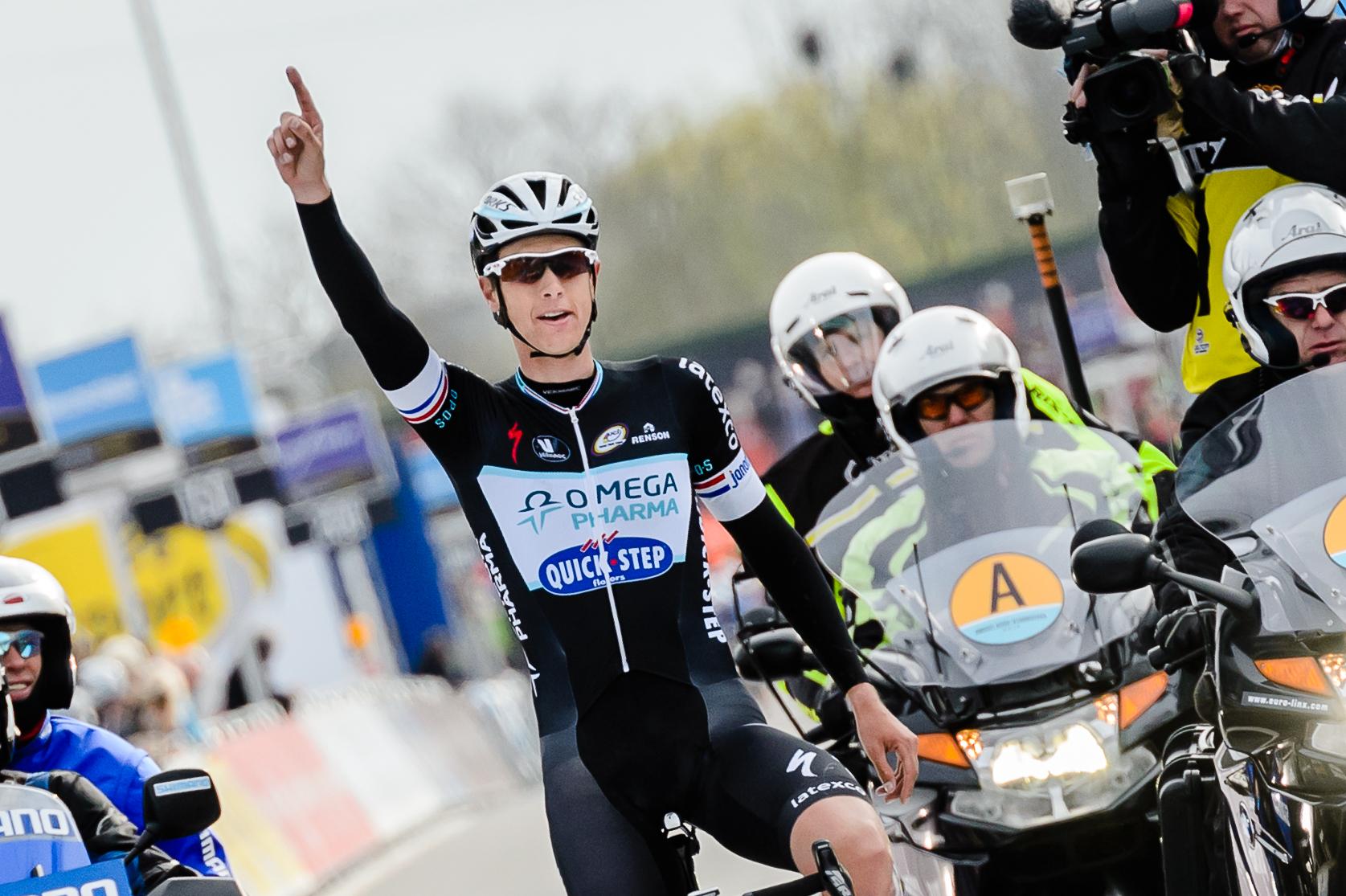
Terpstra celebrates winning the 2014 Dwars door Vlaanderen, his second victory in the race.

Monument	2007	2008	2009	2010	2011	2012	2013	2014	2015	2016	2017	2018	2019	2020	2021	2022
Milan–San Remo	—	143	83	41	38	45	DNF	—	—	—	—	—	56	—	139	—
Tour of Flanders	—	14	OTL	45	—	6	113	6	2	10	3	1	DNF	111	86	29
Paris–Roubaix	74	103	16	32	—	5	3	1	15	DNF	DNF	3	—	NH	OTL	50
Liège–Bastogne–Liège	DSQ	—	—	DNF	—	—	—	—	—	—	—	—	—	—	—	—
Giro di Lombardia	—	—	DNF	—	—	—	—	—	—	—	—	—	—	—	—	—
Classic	2007	2008	2009	2010	2011	2012	2013	2014	2015	2016	2017	2018	2019	2020	2021	2022
Omloop Het Nieuwsblad	DNF	86	9	87	6	—	99	5	2	30	51	52	20	33	69	—
Kuurne–Brussels–Kuurne	54	DNF	DNF	DNF	—	—	NH	DNF	—	56	—	54	3	40	DNF	—
Strade Bianche	DNF	—	—	—	—	—	—	—	55	—	—	—	—	—	—	—
E3 Harelbeke	56	33	15	—	14	25	DNF	2	14	13	19	1	15	NH	46	DNF
Gent–Wevelgem	—	—	DNF	OTL	—	—	—	—	2	21	4	39	23	73	59	71
Dwars door Vlaanderen	—	12	33	3	30	1	11	1	18	35	25	9	60	NH	52	21
Amstel Gold Race	DNF	113	DNF	DNF	—	28	DNF	—	—	—	—	DNF	—	NH	—	97
Bretagne Classic	—	—	—	62	119	—	—	—	—	—	—	—	61	—	93	—
Grand Prix Cycliste de Québec	Race did not exist			—	DNF	—	6	—	—	—	—	—	—	—	—	—
Grand Prix Cycliste de Montréal	Race did not exist			—	20	—	57	—	—	—	—	—	—	—	—	—
Paris–Tours	86	—	74	91	—	3	10	—	30	—	3	2	2	—	51	127

==== Major championships results timeline ====
Event		2007	2008	2009	2010	2011	2012	2013	2014	2015	2016	2017	2018	2019	2020	2021	2022
Olympic Games	Road race	NH	DNF	Not held			82	Not held			—	Not held				—	NH
World Championships	Road race	—	—	—	19	165	66	—	—	13	9	24	—	20	—	—	—
World Championships	Time trial	—	—	—	—	—	—	25	—	—	—	—	—	—	—	—	—
World Championships	Team time trial	Not held					1	1	3	2	1	4	1	Not held			
European Games	Road race	Event did not exist								8	Not held			—	Not held		
National Championships	Road race	12	12	26	1	31	1	5	2	1	—	—	37	40	DNF	13	25
National Championships	Time trial	—	—	8	5	6	3	2	10	—	—	—	2	5	NH	—	—

Legend
—	Did not compete
DNF	Did not finish
DSQ	Disqualified
OTL	Outside time limit
NH	Not held

=== Track ===
2004
1st Scratch, National Championships
2005
National Championships

1st Scratch
1st Points race

2nd Team pursuit, UCI World Championships
2006
National Championships

1st Individual pursuit
1st Madison (with Wim Stroetinga)

2007
National Championships

1st Scratch
1st Madison (with Wim Stroetinga)

2011
2nd Madison, National Championships (with Yoeri Havik)
2013
1st Six Days of Rotterdam (with Iljo Keisse)
2014
1st Six Days of Rotterdam (with Iljo Keisse)
1st Six Days of Amsterdam (with Yoeri Havik)
2015
1st Six Days of Rotterdam (with Iljo Keisse)
2016
3rd Six Days of Rotterdam (with Yoeri Havik)
2019
1st Six Days of Rotterdam (with Thomas Boudat)
2022
2nd Six Days of Rotterdam (with Yoeri Havik)

== See also ==
- List of Dutch Olympic cyclists

Preceded by Koos Moerenhout	Dutch National Road Race Championships; Winner; 2010	Succeeded by Pim Ligthart
Preceded by Pim Ligthart	Dutch National Road Race Championships; Winner; 2012	Succeeded by Johnny Hoogerland
Preceded by Fabian Cancellara	Winner of Paris–Roubaix; 2014	Succeeded by John Degenkolb
Preceded by Sebastian Langeveld	Dutch National Road Race Championships; Winner; 2015	Succeeded by Dylan Groenewegen
