= 2017 Clásica de Almería =

2017 UCI Europe Tour

Race details
- Dates: 12 February 2017
- Stages: 1
- Distance: 190.9 km (118.6 mi)
- Winning time: 4h 31' 22"

Results
	Winner	Magnus Cort (Denmark)	(Orica–Scott)
	Second	Rüdiger Selig (Germany)	(Bora–Hansgrohe)
	Third	Jens Debusschere (Belgium)	(Lotto–Soudal)

The 2017 Clásica de Almería was the 32nd edition of the Clásica de Almería road cycling one day race. It was part of the 2017 UCI Europe Tour, as a 1.1 categorised race.

In a sprint finish, Denmark's Magnus Cort (Orica–Scott) won the race ahead of Bora–Hansgrohe's Rüdiger Selig, while the podium was completed by Jens Debusschere for the Lotto–Soudal team.

== Teams ==
Seventeen teams were invited to take part in the race. These included six UCI WorldTeams, nine UCI Professional Continental teams and two UCI Continental teams.

UCI WorldTeams

- Bahrain–Merida
- Bora–Hansgrohe
- Team Katusha–Alpecin
- Lotto–Soudal
- Movistar Team
- Orica–Scott

UCI Professional Continental Teams

- Caja Rural–Seguros RGA
- CCC–Sprandi–Polkowice
- Cofidis
- Direct Énergie
- Gazprom–RusVelo
- Roompot–Nederlandse Loterij
- Sport Vlaanderen–Baloise
- Vérandas Willems–Crelan
- Wanty–Groupe Gobert

UCI Continental Teams

- Burgos BH
- Euskadi Basque Country–Murias

== Result ==
Result
Rank	Rider	Team	Time
1	Magnus Cort (DNK)	Orica–Scott	4h 31' 22"
2	Rüdiger Selig (GER)	Bora–Hansgrohe	+ 0"
3	Jens Debusschere (BEL)	Lotto–Soudal	+ 0"
4	Carlos Barbero (ESP)	Movistar Team	+ 0"
5	Amaury Capiot (BEL)	Sport Vlaanderen–Baloise	+ 0"
6	Baptiste Planckaert (BEL)	Team Katusha–Alpecin	+ 0"
7	Maciej Paterski (POL)	CCC–Sprandi–Polkowice	+ 0"
8	Daniel López (ESP)	Burgos BH	+ 0"
9	Raymond Kreder (NED)	Roompot–Nederlandse Loterij	+ 0"
10	Jonas van Genechten (BEL)	Cofidis	+ 0"
