= Carlos Barbero =

Spanish bicycle racer

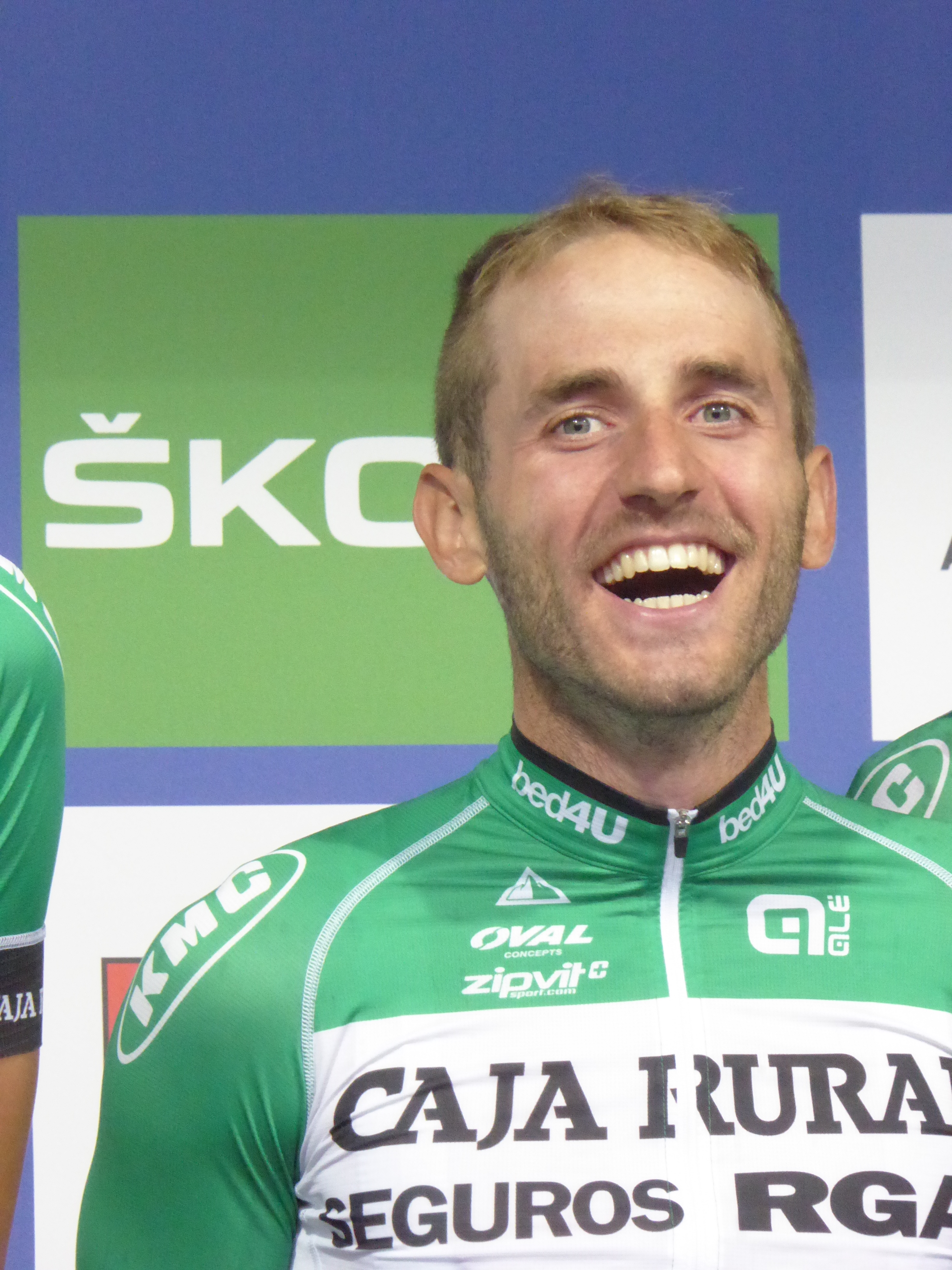
- Barbero at the 2016 Tour of Britain.

Personal information
- Full name: Carlos Barbero Cuesta
- Born: 29 April 1991 (age 35) Burgos, Spain
- Height: 1.78 m (5 ft 10 in)
- Weight: 66 kg (146 lb)

Cycling career
- Sport: Cycling
- Discipline: Road
- Role: Rider
- Rider type: Sprinter

Amateur team
- 2010–2011: Naturgas Energía

Professional teams
- 2012–2014: Orbea
- 2015–2016: Caja Rural–Seguros RGA
- 2017–2019: Movistar Team
- 2020–2021: NTT Pro Cycling
- 2022: Lotto–Soudal

Carlos Barbero Cuesta (born 29 April 1991 in Burgos) is a Spanish former cyclist, who competed as a professional from 2012 to 2022. He rode in the 2015 Vuelta a España.

== Major results ==
2013
1st Stage 2 Ronde de l'Isard
1st Young rider classification, Vuelta a Burgos
5th Overall Vuelta a Castilla y León
6th Road race, Mediterranean Games
9th Overall Volta ao Alentejo
2014
1st Overall Volta ao Alentejo

1st Points classification

1st Circuito de Getxo
3rd Road race, National Road Championships
3rd Vuelta a La Rioja
10th Overall Tour du Loir-et-Cher
10th Overall Ronde de l'Oise
2015
1st Philadelphia International Championship
Tour de Beauce

1st Stages 1 & 4

1st Stage 2 Vuelta a la Comunidad de Madrid
1st Stage 1 Vuelta a Burgos
2nd Road race, National Road Championships
3rd Klasika Primavera
3rd Circuito de Getxo
4th Vuelta a La Rioja
2016
2nd Vuelta a La Rioja
3rd Coppa Sabatini
4th Coppa Bernocchi
6th Grand Prix d'Ouverture La Marseillaise
6th Klasika Primavera
8th Tour de Vendée
2017
1st Overall Volta ao Alentejo

1st Points classification

1st Circuito de Getxo
1st Stage 3 Vuelta a Castilla y León
1st Stage 4 Vuelta a Burgos
4th Clásica de Almería
5th Road race, National Road Championships
5th Overall Hammer Sportzone Limburg

1st Stage 1

8th Vuelta a La Rioja
10th Overall Vuelta a la Comunidad de Madrid

1st Stage 2

2018
Vuelta a la Comunidad de Madrid

1st Points classification
1st Stage 3

1st Stage 4 Vuelta a Burgos
2nd Overall Vuelta a Castilla y León

1st Points classification
1st Stage 1

2nd Gran Premio Bruno Beghelli
2nd Circuito de Getxo
5th Road race, National Road Championships
5th Trofeo Palma
8th Clásica de Almería
2019
1st Stage 1 Tour of Austria
3rd Overall Vuelta a la Comunidad de Madrid
4th Clásica de Almería
8th Klasika Primavera
9th Overall Vuelta a Castilla y León
10th Kuurne–Brussels–Kuurne
2020
6th Overall Saudi Tour
6th Memorial Marco Pantani
10th Coppa Sabatini

=== Grand Tour general classification results timeline ===
Grand Tour	2015	2016	2017	2018	2019	2020	2021
Giro d'Italia	Has not contested during his career						
Tour de France	—	—	—	—	—	—	124
Vuelta a España	149	—	—	—	—	107	—

Legend
—	Did not compete
DNF	Did not finish
IP	In progress
