= 2019 Paris–Tours =

2019 UCI Europe Tour

Race details
- Dates: 13 October 2019
- Distance: 217 km (134.8 mi)
- Winning time: 5h 34' 20"

Results
	Winner	Jelle Wallays (BEL)	(Lotto–Soudal)
	Second	Niki Terpstra (NED)	(Total Direct Énergie)
	Third	Oliver Naesen (BEL)	(AG2R La Mondiale)

The 2019 Paris–Tours was the 113th edition of the Paris–Tours cycling classic. The race was held on 13 October 2019 as part of the 2019 UCI Europe Tour as a 1.HC-ranked event. Jelle Wallays, who had previously won this race in 2014, went solo and achieved his second victory, ahead of Niki Terpstra and Oliver Naesen, who had finished second and fourth respectively the year before.

== Teams ==
Twenty-three teams, of which seven were UCI WorldTeams, fourteen were UCI Professional Continental teams, and two were UCI Continental teams, started the race. Each team entered seven riders, except for Team Dimension Data, Israel Cycling Academy, and Roompot–Charles, which each entered six, and UAE Team Emirates, which entered five. Of the 156 riders who entered the race, only 64 riders finished, while 4 riders did not start.

UCI WorldTeams

- AG2R La Mondiale
- Groupama–FDJ
- Lotto–Soudal
- Team Dimension Data
- Team Jumbo–Visma
- Team Katusha–Alpecin
- Team Sunweb

UCI Professional Continental Teams

- Arkéa–Samsic
- Cofidis
- Delko–Marseille Provence
- Euskadi–Murias
- Gazprom–RusVelo
- Israel Cycling Academy
- Rally UHC Cycling
- Riwal Readynez
- Roompot–Charles
- Sport Vlaanderen–Baloise
- Total Direct Énergie
- Vital Concept–B&B Hotels
- Wallonie Bruxelles
- Wanty–Gobert

UCI Continental Teams

- Natura4Ever–Roubaix–Lille Métropole
- St. Michel–Auber93

== Results ==
Result
Rank	Rider	Team	Time
1	Jelle Wallays (BEL)	Lotto–Soudal	5h 34' 20"
2	Niki Terpstra (NED)	Total Direct Énergie	+ 29"
3	Oliver Naesen (BEL)	AG2R La Mondiale	+ 30"
4	Arnaud Démare (FRA)	Groupama–FDJ	+ 36"
5	Amaury Capiot (BEL)	Sport Vlaanderen–Baloise	+ 49"
6	Aimé De Gendt (BEL)	Wanty–Gobert	+ 49"
7	Lars Bak (DEN)	Team Dimension Data	+ 51"
8	Bert De Backer (BEL)	Vital Concept–B&B Hotels	+ 53"
9	Kevyn Ista (BEL)	Wallonie Bruxelles	+ 53"
10	Julien Vermote (BEL)	Team Dimension Data	+ 53"
