= 2016 Dwars door Vlaanderen =

- Event poster with previous winner Jelle Wallays

Race details
- Dates: March 23, 2016
- Stages: 1
- Distance: 199.7 km (124.1 mi)
- Winning time: 4h 47' 55"

Results
	Winner	Jens Debusschere (BEL)	(Lotto–Soudal)
	Second	Bryan Coquard (FRA)	(Direct Énergie)
	Third	Edward Theuns (BEL)	(Trek–Segafredo)

The 2016 Dwars door Vlaanderen (English: "Across Flanders") is a one-day road cycling race that took place in Flanders on 23 March 2016. It was the 71st edition of the Dwars door Vlaanderen race.

The race is part of the cobbled classics season. It uses some of the same roads and climbs as other such races, including the Tour of Flanders. The defending champion was Jelle Wallays (Lotto–Soudal).

The day before the race was due to take place, there was a series of attacks in Brussels. This caused a heightened security level in Belgium and led to the possibility that the race would be cancelled. The organisers of the race decided to continue, however, with the final decision to be taken by the Belgian government on the day of the race itself. Team Giant–Alpecin, one of the teams scheduled to take part in the race, was forced to withdraw: they had entered the minimum number of riders (six); three of these were unable to travel to Belgium because their flights were cancelled. The race started as planned, following a minute's silence. Like Team Giant–Alpecin, several other teams had riders unable to attend the race due to travel restrictions; Movistar started the race with four riders instead of eight.

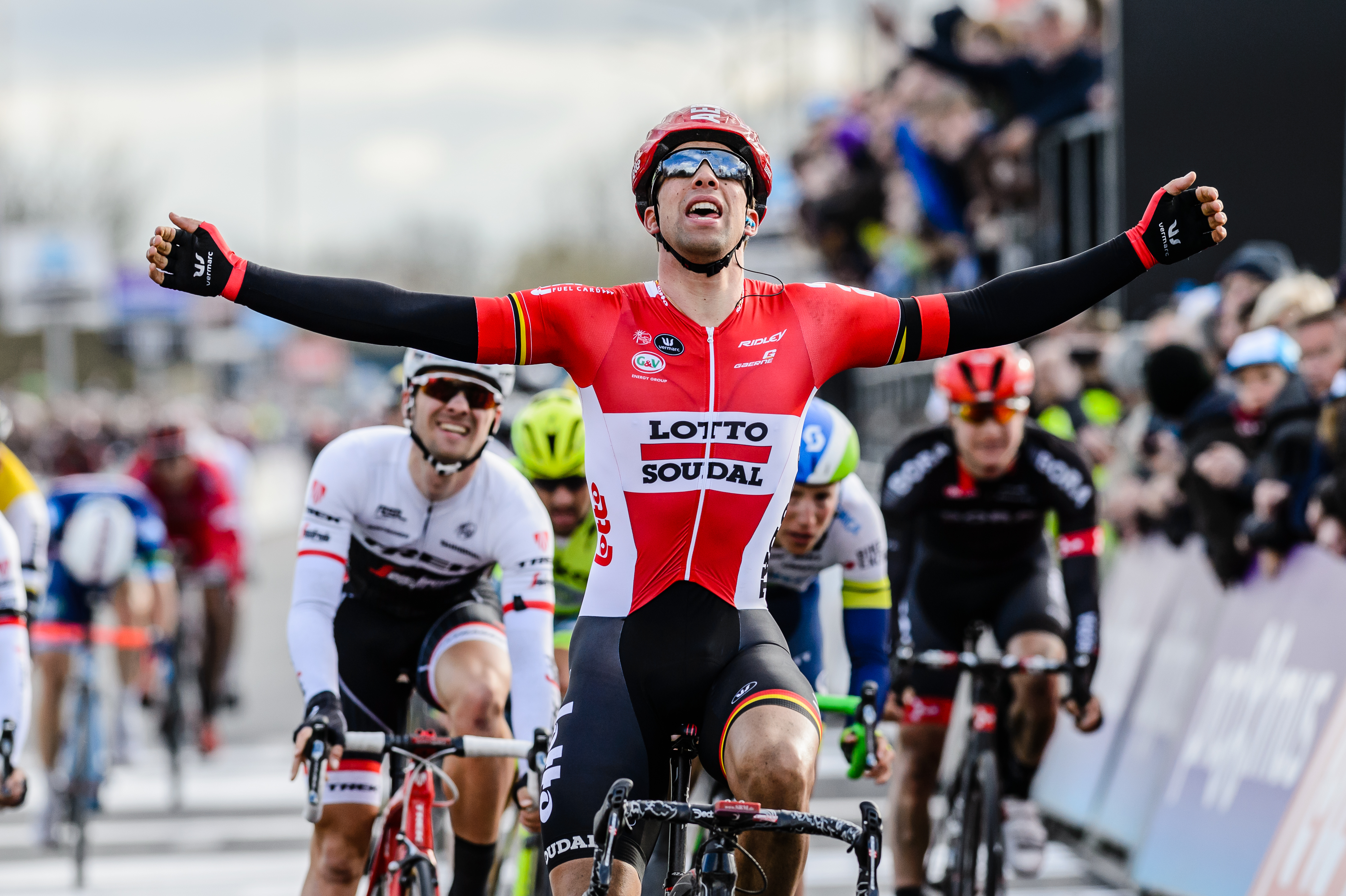
Jens Debusschere arriving first in Waregem

The race was won by Jens Debusschere (Lotto–Soudal) in a sprint finish, after his teammates chased down Greg Van Avermaet (BMC Racing Team) in the closing kilometres. Bryan Coquard (Direct Énergie) finished second, with Edward Theuns (Trek–Segafredo) third.

== Teams ==
The race organisers originally invited 23 teams to take part in the race. Because of the attacks in Belgium and the subsequent travel restrictions, Team Giant–Alpecin were forced to withdraw, so 22 teams started the race. Of these, 11 were UCI WorldTeams and 11 were UCI Professional Continental teams.

UCI WorldTeams

- Lotto–Soudal
- Movistar Team
- BMC Racing Team
- Etixx–Quick-Step
- Trek–Segafredo
- Tinkoff
- IAM Cycling
- Team Katusha
- AG2R La Mondiale
- LottoNL–Jumbo
- Orica–GreenEDGE
- ~~Team Giant–Alpecin~~ (withdrew)

UCI Professional Continental teams

- Topsport Vlaanderen–Baloise
- Wanty–Groupe Gobert
- Direct Énergie
- Cofidis
- Fortuneo–Vital Concept
- Roompot–Oranje Peloton
- CCC–Sprandi–Polkowice
- Bora–Argon 18
- Gazprom–RusVelo
- Stölting Service Group
- Southeast–Venezuela

== Route ==
The race started in Roeselare and followed a 199.7-kilometre (124.1 mi) course to finish in Waregem. It began with a long flat section that took the riders generally east from Roeselare and into Waregem; it then left the town and went south. At Avelgem, the course turned back east again to cross the first climb, the Nieuwe Kwaremont, after 92 kilometres (57 mi). This was followed by the climb of the Kattenberg, then the cobbled flat sectors of the Holleweg and the Haaghoek, then the climbs of the Leberg and the Berendries. After the next climb, the Valkenberg, the course turned back west towards the finish, with 70 kilometres (43 mi) remaining. The Eikenberg and the Taaienberg followed soon after, then the combination of the Oude Kwaremont and the Paterberg. After the final flat cobbled sector, the Varentstraat, the course turned north for the final three climbs: the Vossenhol (Tiegemberg), Holstraat and Nokereberg. From the summit of Nokereberg, there were around 10 kilometres (6.2 mi) to the finish in Waregem.

Hills in 2016 Dwars door Vlaanderen
Hill	Name	Pavement	Length (m)	Average %	Max %	Km from finish
1	Nieuwe Kwaremont	asphalt	2 000	4,2 %	8%	107,5
2	Kattenberg	asphalt	740	5,9 %	8,2 %	88,1
3	Leberg	asphalt	700	6,1 %	14%	79,5
4	Berendries	asphalt	900	7,2 %	14%	75,3
5	Valkenberg	asphalt	540	8,1 %	12,8 %	70,3
6	Eikenberg	cobbles	1 250	5,8 %	10%	57,5
7	Taaienberg	cobbles	530	6,6 %	15,8 %	51,8
8	Oude Kwaremont	cobbles	1 500	4%	11,6 %	34
9	Paterberg	cobbles	365	12,9 %	20,3 %	30,5
10	Tiegemberg	asphalt	1 400	6,5 %	9%	19,8
11	Holstraat	asphalt	1 000	5,2 %	12%	15,4
12	Nokereberg	cobbles	500	5,7 %	6,7 %	7,9

== Race summary ==
At the start of the race, there were 161 riders in the peloton. Most of these wore black armbands following the previous day's attacks. The breakaway took half an hour's racing to form, with Alexis Gougeard (AG2R La Mondiale), Jesper Asselman (Roompot–Oranje Peloton), Alex Kirsch (Stölting Service Group), Phil Bauhaus (Bora–Argon 18), Igor Boev (Gazprom–RusVelo), and Kevin Van Melsen (Wanty–Groupe Gobert) forming a six-man breakaway and built a lead of up to eight minutes. Preben Van Hecke (Topsport Vlaanderen–Baloise) and Kenneth Vanbilsen (Cofidis) made unsuccessful attempts to escape from the peloton, with Etixx–Quick-Step chasing hard and bringing the breakaway's advantage down to three minutes. Mike Teunissen (LottoNL–Jumbo) attacked from the peloton and was joined by Jonas Rickaert (Topsport Vlaanderen–Baloise) and Luke Durbridge (Orica–GreenEDGE). Boev and Gougeard were dropped from the breakaway and joined the chasing group on the Taaienberg, with a group of about eleven riders breaking away from the peloton. Van Melsen then attacked alone on the Oude Kwaremont. The two chasing groups came together shortly afterwards, with a group led by Greg Van Avermaet (BMC) chasing behind. After more attacks, the lead group was reduced to seven riders with 15 kilometres (9.3 mi) remaining and, 5 kilometres (3.1 mi) later, the front groups came together. Van Avermaet made his own attack on the Nokereberg, gaining a lead of around 15 seconds, but he was chased by Etixx–Quick-Step and Trek–Segafredo. He was caught with around 250 metres (820 ft) remaining, leaving a group of 34 riders to sprint for the finish. Etixx–Quick-Step's Fernando Gaviria was the first to sprint, but he faded quickly and ended up tenth. Bryan Coquard (Direct Énergie) had a lead and came close to the victory, but his celebration before the finish line allowed Jens Debusschere (Lotto–Soudal) to take the win in a photo finish.

== Result ==
Result (top 10)
Rank	Rider	Team	Time
1	Jens Debusschere (BEL)	Lotto–Soudal	4h 48' 27"
2	Bryan Coquard (FRA)	Direct Énergie	+ 0"
3	Edward Theuns (BEL)	Trek–Segafredo	+ 0"
4	Filippo Pozzato (ITA)	Southeast–Venezuela	+ 0"
5	Jens Keukeleire (BEL)	Orica–GreenEDGE	+ 0"
6	Giacomo Nizzolo (ITA)	Trek–Segafredo	+ 0"
7	Oscar Gatto (ITA)	Tinkoff	+ 0"
8	Scott Thwaites (GBR)	Bora–Argon 18	+ 0"
9	Mike Teunissen (NED)	LottoNL–Jumbo	+ 0"
10	Fernando Gaviria (COL)	Etixx–Quick-Step	+ 0"
