= 2012 Dwars door Vlaanderen =

- Event poster with previous winner Nick Nuyens

Race details
- Dates: 21 March 2012
- Stages: 1
- Distance: 200 km (124.3 mi)
- Winning time: 4h 30' 01"

Results
	Winner	Niki Terpstra (NED)
	Second	Sylvain Chavanel (FRA)
	Third	Koen de Kort (NED)

The 2012 Dwars door Vlaanderen was the 67th edition of the Dwars door Vlaanderen cycle race and was held on 21 March 2012. The race started in Roeselare and finished in Waregem. The race was won by Niki Terpstra.

== General classification ==
Final general classification

Rank	Rider	Time
1	Niki Terpstra (NED)	4h 30' 01"
2	Sylvain Chavanel (FRA)	+ 47"
3	Koen de Kort (NED)	+ 47"
4	Jan Ghyselinck (BEL)	+ 51"
5	Alexandre Pichot (FRA)	+ 53"
6	Filippo Pozzato (ITA)	+ 1' 00"
7	Sep Vanmarcke (BEL)	+ 1' 05"
8	Maarten Wynants (BEL)	+ 1' 16"
9	Lloyd Mondory (FRA)	+ 1' 16"
10	Jens Keukeleire (BEL)	+ 1' 16"
