= 2014 Paris–Tours =

2014 UCI Europe Tour

Race details
- Dates: 12 October 2014
- Distance: 237.5 km (147.6 mi)
- Winning time: 5h 26' 18"

Results
	Winner	Jelle Wallays (BEL)	(Topsport Vlaanderen–Baloise)
	Second	Thomas Voeckler (FRA)	(Team Europcar)
	Third	Jens Debusschere (BEL)	(Lotto–Belisol)

The 2014 Paris–Tours was the 108th edition of the Paris–Tours cycle race and was held on 12 October 2014. The race started in Saint-Arnoult-en-Yvelines and finished in Tours. The race was won by Jelle Wallays of the Topsport Vlaanderen–Baloise team.

== Teams ==
A total of 21 teams raced in the 2014 Paris–Tours: 11 UCI ProTeams, 7 UCI Professional Continental teams, and 3 UCI Continental teams.

- Ag2r–La Mondiale
- Belkin Pro Cycling
- BigMat–Auber 93
- BMC Racing Team
- Bretagne–Séché Environnement
- Cofidis
- Team Europcar
- FDJ.fr
- Garmin–Sharp
- Giant–Shimano
- IAM Cycling
- Team La Pomme Marseille 13
- Lotto–Belisol
- MTN–Qhubeka
- NetApp–Endura
- Omega Pharma–Quick-Step
- Roubaix–Lille Métropole
- Tinkoff–Saxo
- Topsport Vlaanderen–Baloise
- Trek Factory Racing
- Wanty–Groupe Gobert

== Results ==
Rank	Rider	Team	Time
1	Jelle Wallays (BEL)	Topsport Vlaanderen–Baloise	5h 26' 18"
2	Thomas Voeckler (FRA)	Team Europcar	+ 0"
3	Jens Debusschere (BEL)	Lotto–Belisol	+ 12"
4	Roy Jans (BEL)	Wanty–Groupe Gobert	+ 12"
5	Heinrich Haussler (AUS)	IAM Cycling	+ 12"
6	Jempy Drucker (LUX)	Wanty–Groupe Gobert	+ 12"
7	Kristian Sbaragli (ITA)	MTN–Qhubeka	+ 12"
8	Pierre-Luc Périchon (FRA)	Bretagne–Séché Environnement	+ 12"
9	Guillaume Levarlet (FRA)	Cofidis	+ 12"
10	Jos van Emden (NED)	Belkin Pro Cycling	+ 12"
