= 2019 Kuurne–Brussels–Kuurne =

- Event poster with illustrations by cartoonist Nesten

Race details
- Dates: 3 March 2019
- Stages: 1
- Distance: 201.1 km (125.0 mi)
- Winning time: 4h 42' 54"

Results
	Winner	Bob Jungels (LUX)	(Deceuninck–Quick-Step)
	Second	Owain Doull (GBR)	(Team Sky)
	Third	Niki Terpstra (NED)	(Direct Énergie)

The 71st edition of the Kuurne–Brussels–Kuurne cycling classic was held on 3 March 2019. It was part of the 2019 UCI Europe Tour and ranked as a 1.HC event. The route was 201.1 km (125 mi), starting and finishing in Kuurne. It was the second and concluding race of the Belgian opening weekend, the year's first road races in Northwestern Europe, one day after Omloop Het Nieuwsblad.

The race was won by Bob Jungels of Deceuninck–Quick-Step, followed by Owain Doull in second and Niki Terpstra finishing in third. 165 riders started and 70 riders finished the race.

== Teams ==
Twenty-five teams were invited to start the race. These included seventeen UCI WorldTeams and eight UCI Professional Continental teams.

UCI WorldTeams

- AG2R La Mondiale
- Astana
- Bora–Hansgrohe
- Bahrain–Merida
- CCC Team
- Team Dimension Data
- Groupama–FDJ
- Team Katusha–Alpecin
- Lotto–Soudal
- Team Jumbo–Visma
- Mitchelton–Scott
- Deceuninck–Quick-Step
- Trek–Segafredo
- UAE Team Emirates
- Movistar Team
- Team Sky

UCI Professional Continental teams

- Cofidis
- Arkéa–Samsic
- Roompot–Charles
- Israel Cycling Academy
- Sport Vlaanderen–Baloise
- Wanty–Gobert
- Vital Concept–B&B Hotels
- Direct Énergie

== Results ==
Result
Rank	Rider	Team	Time
1	Bob Jungels (LUX)	Deceuninck–Quick-Step	4h 51' 41"
2	Owain Doull (GBR)	Team Sky	+ 12"
3	Niki Terpstra (NED)	Direct Énergie	+ 12"
4	Dylan Groenewegen (NED)	Team Jumbo–Visma	+ 12"
5	Yves Lampaert (BEL)	Deceuninck–Quick-Step	+ 12"
6	Florian Sénéchal (FRA)	Deceuninck–Quick-Step	+ 12"
7	Jens Keukeleire (BEL)	Lotto–Soudal	+ 12"
8	André Greipel (GER)	Arkéa–Samsic	+ 12"
9	Jasper De Buyst (BEL)	Lotto–Soudal	+ 12"
10	Carlos Barbero (SPA)	Movistar Team	+ 12"
