= 2013 Dwars door Vlaanderen =

- Event poster with previous winner Niki Terpstra

Race details
- Dates: 20 March 2013
- Stages: 1
- Distance: 200 km (124.3 mi)
- Winning time: 4h 43' 40"

Results
	Winner	Oscar Gatto (ITA)
	Second	Borut Božič (SLO)
	Third	Mathew Hayman (AUS)

The 2013 Dwars door Vlaanderen was the 68th edition of the Dwars door Vlaanderen cycle race and was held on 20 March 2013. The race started in Roeselare and finished in Waregem. The race was won by Oscar Gatto.

== General classification ==
Final general classification

Rank	Rider	Time
1	Oscar Gatto (ITA)	4h 43' 40"
2	Borut Božič (SLO)	+ 0"
3	Mathew Hayman (AUS)	+ 0"
4	Mirko Selvaggi (ITA)	+ 0"
5	Thomas Voeckler (FRA)	+ 0"
6	Nikolas Maes (BEL)	+ 0"
7	Jens Keukeleire (BEL)	+ 0"
8	Maxim Iglinsky (KAZ)	+ 0"
9	Ian Stannard (GBR)	+ 4"
10	Stijn Vandenbergh (BEL)	+ 24"
