= 2014 Dwars door Vlaanderen =

- Event poster with previous winner Oscar Gatto

Race details
- Dates: 26 March 2014
- Stages: 1
- Distance: 200.8 km (124.8 mi)
- Winning time: 4h 31' 43"

Results
	Winner	Niki Terpstra (NED)
	Second	Tyler Farrar (USA)
	Third	Borut Božič (SLO)

The 2014 Dwars door Vlaanderen was the 69th edition of the Dwars door Vlaanderen cycle race and was held on 26 March 2014. The race started in Roeselare and finished in Waregem. The race was won by Niki Terpstra.

== General classification ==
Final general classification

Rank	Rider	Time
1	Niki Terpstra (NED)	4h 31' 43"
2	Tyler Farrar (USA)	+ 17"
3	Borut Božič (SLO)	+ 17"
4	Jempy Drucker (LUX)	+ 17"
5	Sylvain Chavanel (FRA)	+ 17"
6	Jens Debusschere (BEL)	+ 17"
7	Tom Van Asbroeck (BEL)	+ 17"
8	Oscar Gatto (ITA)	+ 17"
9	Jens Keukeleire (BEL)	+ 17"
10	Yauheni Hutarovich (BLR)	+ 17"
