= Oscar Gatto =

Italian road bicycle racer (born 1985)

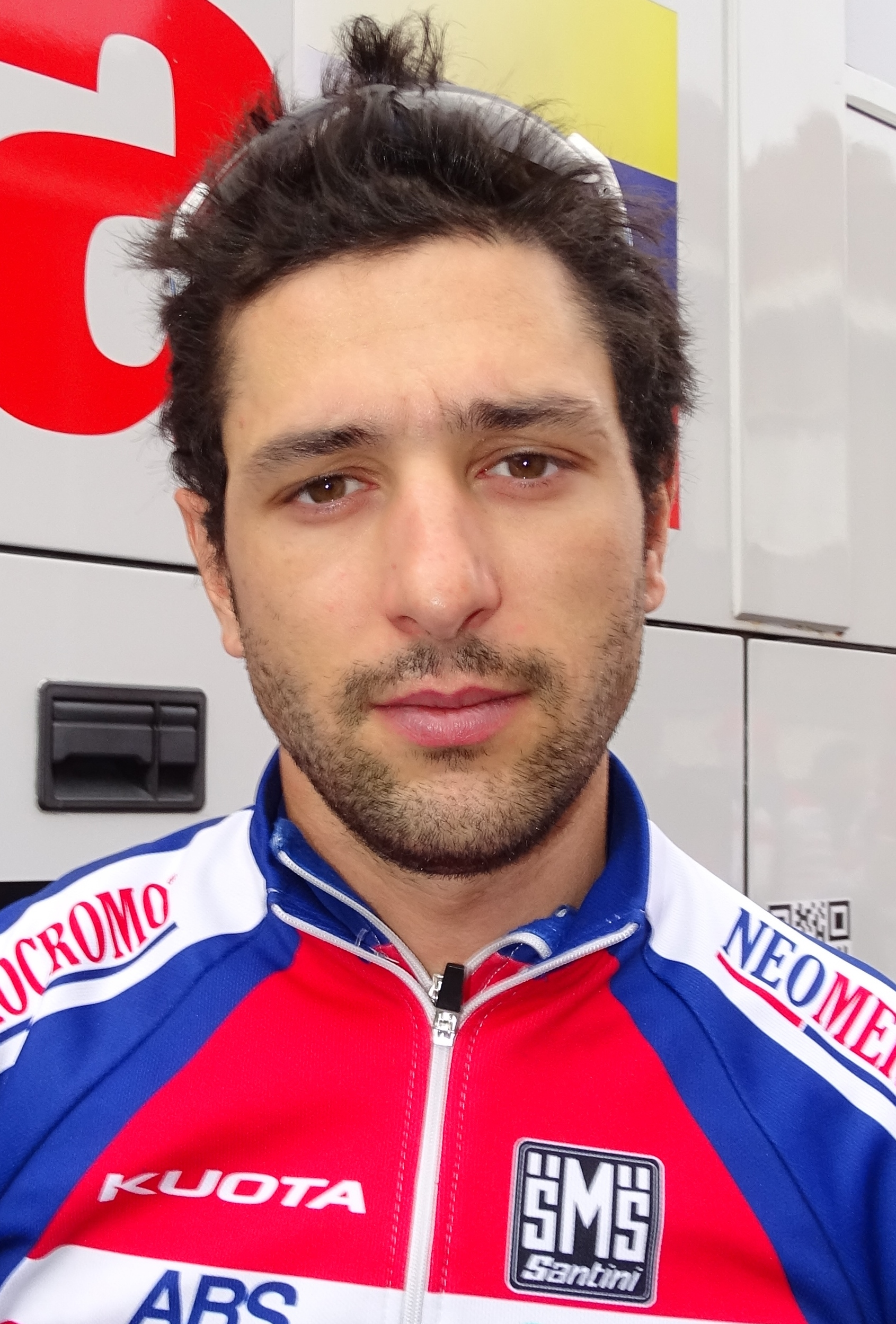
- Gatto at the 2015 E3 Harelbeke

Personal information
- Full name: Oscar Gatto
- Born: 1 January 1985 (age 41) Montebelluna, Italy
- Height: 1.74 m (5 ft 9 in)
- Weight: 67 kg (148 lb)

Cycling career
- Sport: Cycling
- Discipline: Road
- Role: Rider
- Rider type: Sprinter; Classics specialist

Amateur teams
- 2005–2006: Zalf–Désirée–Fior
- 2006: →Team LPR (stagiaire)

Professional teams
- 2007–2008: Gerolsteiner
- 2009–2013: ISD
- 2014: Cannondale
- 2015: Androni Giocattoli
- 2016: Tinkoff
- 2017–2018: Astana
- 2019–2020: Bora–Hansgrohe

Major wins
- Grand Tours Giro d'Italia 1 individual stage (2011) One-day races and Classics Dwars door Vlaanderen (2013)

Oscar Gatto (born 1 January 1985) is an Italian former professional racing cyclist, who rode professionally between 2007 and 2020, for seven different teams. His nickname is 'Oscar the Cat' because his surname (Gatto) is the Italian word for "cat", and his first name is Oscar.

== Career ==
Born in Montebelluna, Gatto left Vini Fantini–Selle Italia at the end of the 2013 season, and joined Cannondale for the 2014 season. In 2015, he rode for Androni Giocattoli. In October 2015 it was announced that Gatto would join Tinkoff for the 2016 season, with the team's directeur sportif Steven de Jongh describing his main role as providing support for Peter Sagan in the classics. He was named in the start list for the 2016 Tour de France.

== Major results ==
2004
4th Circuito del Porto
2005
1st Giro del Canavese
1st Stage 6 Giro della Valle d'Aosta
2006
1st Coppa Città di Asti
1st Stage 6 Giro delle Regioni
5th Gran Premio della Liberazione
7th Giro del Canavese
10th Giro del Belvedere
2007
2nd Overall Paris–Corrèze
2009
1st Stage 1b (TTT) Settimana Internazionale di Coppi e Bartali
2nd Overall Giro di Sardegna

1st Stage 3

8th Gran Premio della Costa Etruschi
2010
1st Gran Premio Nobili Rubinetterie
1st Stage 1 (TTT) Brixia Tour
3rd GP Kranj
5th Trofeo Matteotti
5th Gran Premio della Costa Etruschi
7th Overall Tour of Turkey
2011
1st Trofeo Matteotti
1st Giro della Romagna
1st Stage 8 Giro d'Italia
1st Stage 2 Giro della Provincia di Reggio Calabria
3rd Coppa Ugo Agostoni
5th Classica Sarda
5th Gran Premio Industria e Commercio di Prato
7th Montepaschi Strade Bianche
2012
1st Giro del Veneto
1st Stage 3 Monviso-Venezia — Il Padania
3rd Strade Bianche
6th Memorial Marco Pantani
6th Gran Premio Industria e Commercio di Prato
2013
1st Dwars door Vlaanderen
3rd GP Industria & Artigianato di Larciano
8th Trofeo Laigueglia
2014
Tour of Austria

1st Stages 2 & 4

8th Dwars door Vlaanderen
2015
Sibiu Cycling Tour

1st Stages 1 & 4

6th Strade Bianche
6th Gran Premio Nobili Rubinetterie
6th Gran Premio della Costa Etruschi
9th Gran Premio Bruno Beghelli
9th Clásica de Almería
2016
1st Stage 3 Vuelta a Andalucía
3rd Overall Arctic Race of Norway
7th Dwars door Vlaanderen
2017
1st Prologue Tour of Austria
5th Omloop Het Nieuwsblad
9th Grand Prix of Aargau Canton
2020
9th Grote Prijs Jean-Pierre Monseré

=== Grand Tour general classification results timeline ===
Grand Tour	2007	2008	2009	2010	2011	2012	2013	2014	2015	2016
Giro d'Italia	141	DNF	149	—	105	113	98	116	DNF	—
Tour de France	—	—	—	—	—	—	—	—	—	156
/ Vuelta a España	—	127	—	—	—	—	—	DNF	—	—

Legend
—	Did not compete
DNF	Did not finish
