= 2015 Tour of Flanders =

Bicycle race

2015 UCI World Tour, race 8 of 28
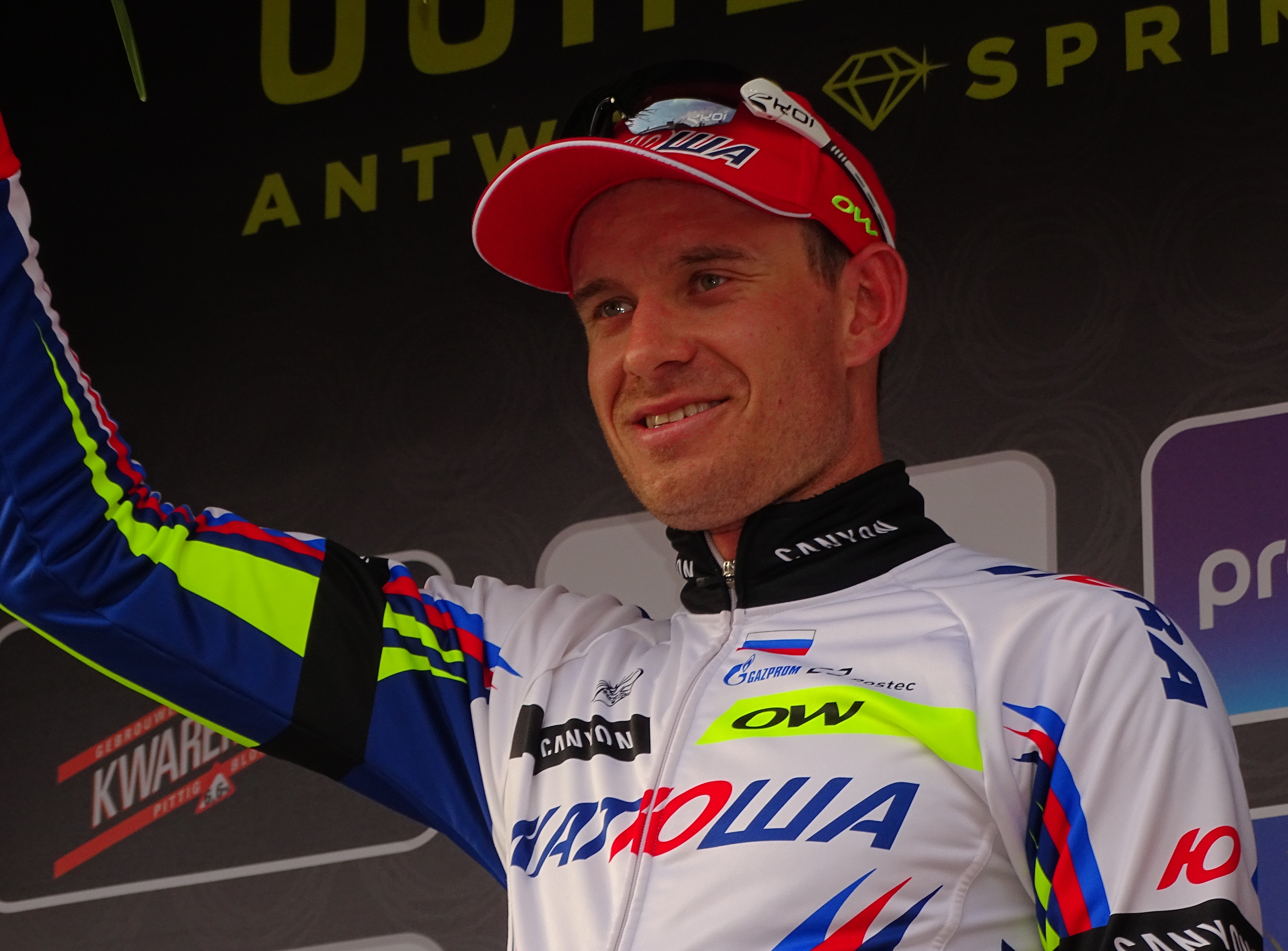
- Alexander Kristoff became the first Norwegian winner

Race details
- Dates: 5 April 2015
- Distance: 264.9 km (164.6 mi)
- Winning time: 6h 26' 32"

Results
	Winner	Alexander Kristoff (NOR)	(Team Katusha)
	Second	Niki Terpstra (NED)	(Etixx–Quick-Step)
	Third	Greg Van Avermaet (BEL)	(BMC Racing Team)

The 2015 Tour of Flanders (Dutch: 2015 Ronde van Vlaanderen) was the 99th edition of the Tour of Flanders one-day cycling race. It took place on 5 April and was the eighth race of the 2015 UCI World Tour. The race was one of the cobbled classics and was the second of the cycling monuments on the 2015 calendar. The 2014 champion was Fabian Cancellara; he was not able to defend his title after breaking two vertebrae in a crash at E3 Harelbeke.

The race was initially dominated by a breakaway group of up to seven riders before the favourites in the chasing group started to attack on the climb of the Taaienberg, 36 kilometres (22 miles) from the finish. Eventually, Alexander Kristoff and Niki Terpstra broke free and contested the victory in a two-man sprint, won by Kristoff, who became the first Norwegian to win the race. Greg Van Avermaet finished third.

== Route ==
The route of the 2015 edition of the race was only slightly adjusted from that of the 2014 edition, with two climbs added to the route in the first 100 kilometres (62 miles), the Tiegemberg and the Berendries. It was 264.9 kilometres (164.6 miles) in length, 5.8 kilometres (3.6 miles) longer than in the previous year and featured 19 small climbs, some of them cobbled. The race started in the Belgian city of Bruges, in the Grote Markt, with a 9.2-kilometre (5.7-mile) neutral zone. The racing began after the riders passed through Loppen, on the outskirts of Brugge. The first part of the route was a 43.6-kilometre (27.1-mile) route south to the city of Kortrijk, passing through Zwevezele, Ardooie and Izegem. This part of the route was almost entirely flat. After Kortrijk, the route turned east towards the region known as the Flemish Ardennes. The final 150 kilometres (93 miles) were kept from the 2014 edition, with the toughest part of the race starting at the steep Koppenberg. In the last 45 kilometres (28 miles), five climbs were set to prove decisive: the Steenbeekdries at 39 kilometres (24 miles) remaining, the Taaienberg at 37 kilometres (23 miles) remaining, the Kruisberg with 28 kilometres (17 miles) to go, the Oude Kwaremont at 17 kilometres (11 miles) remaining and finally the Paterberg, 13 kilometres (8.1 miles) before the finish. Several climbs needed to be tackled more than once, as the route took two laps of a circuit. These included the Oude Kwaremont, which was ridden three times, first after 112 kilometres (70 miles) as the second climb of the day and the Paterberg, which was featured twice.

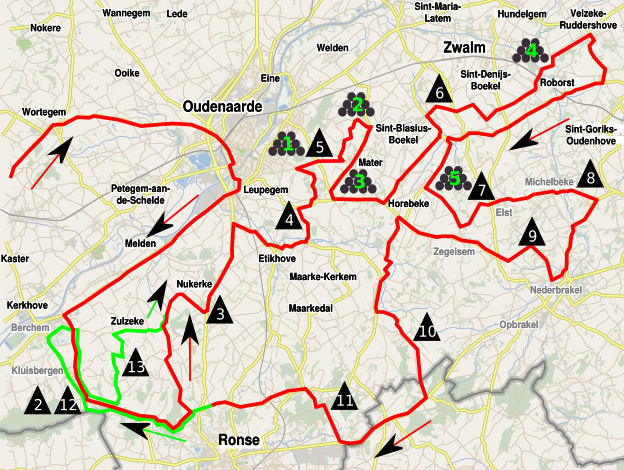
First lap of the circuit (red) and transition to the second lap (green).

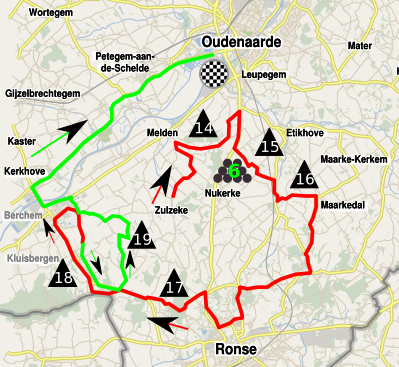
Second lap of the circuit (red) and final (green)

== Teams ==
As the Tour of Flanders was a UCI World Tour event, all 17 UCI WorldTeams were invited automatically and were obliged to send a squad. Eight Professional Continental teams received wildcard invitations.

UCI WorldTeams

- AG2R La Mondiale
- Astana
- BMC Racing Team
- Etixx–Quick-Step
- FDJ
- IAM Cycling
- Lampre–Merida
- Lotto–Soudal
- Movistar Team
- Orica–GreenEDGE
- Cannondale–Garmin
- Team Giant–Alpecin
- Team Katusha
- LottoNL–Jumbo
- Team Sky
- Tinkoff–Saxo
- Trek Factory Racing

UCI Professional Continental teams

- Topsport Vlaanderen–Baloise
- Wanty–Groupe Gobert
- Cofidis
- Team Europcar
- Bora–Argon 18
- MTN–Qhubeka
- Team Roompot
- Androni Giocattoli

== Pre-race favourites ==
The field of the race was marked by the absence of defending champion Fabian Cancellara (Trek Factory Racing) and former winner Tom Boonen (Etixx–Quick-Step), both ruled out by crashes earlier in the season. Several riders were named as potential favourites for the victory, among them Geraint Thomas (Team Sky), who came into the race after a victory at E3 Harelbeke and a third-place finish at Gent–Wevelgem just a few days before. In the absence of Cancellara, Trek Factory Racing's squad was led by Stijn Devolder, the only former winner in the peloton, although he was not considered to have the best chances. Etixx–Quick-Step's squad featured Niki Terpstra, Zdeněk Štybar, and Stijn Vandenbergh, all of whom were considered serious contenders. Team Katusha was led by Alexander Kristoff and Luca Paolini, the latter of which had proven his good form by winning Gent–Wevelgem earlier in the week, but had declared to work for Kristoff for this race. Other possible contenders included Milan–San Remo winner John Degenkolb (Team Giant–Alpecin) and Peter Sagan (Tinkoff–Saxo), although Sagan's form had been called into question prior to the race. In addition, commentators named Greg Van Avermaet (BMC Racing Team), Sep Vanmarcke (LottoNL–Jumbo), Lars Boom (Astana), Filippo Pozzato (Lampre–Merida), Jürgen Roelandts, Jens Debusschere (both Lotto–Soudal), and Sylvain Chavanel (IAM Cycling) among the high number of possible contenders. Barry Ryan of Cyclingnews.com declared the race "wide open and [...] a nightmare to predict".

== Race report ==
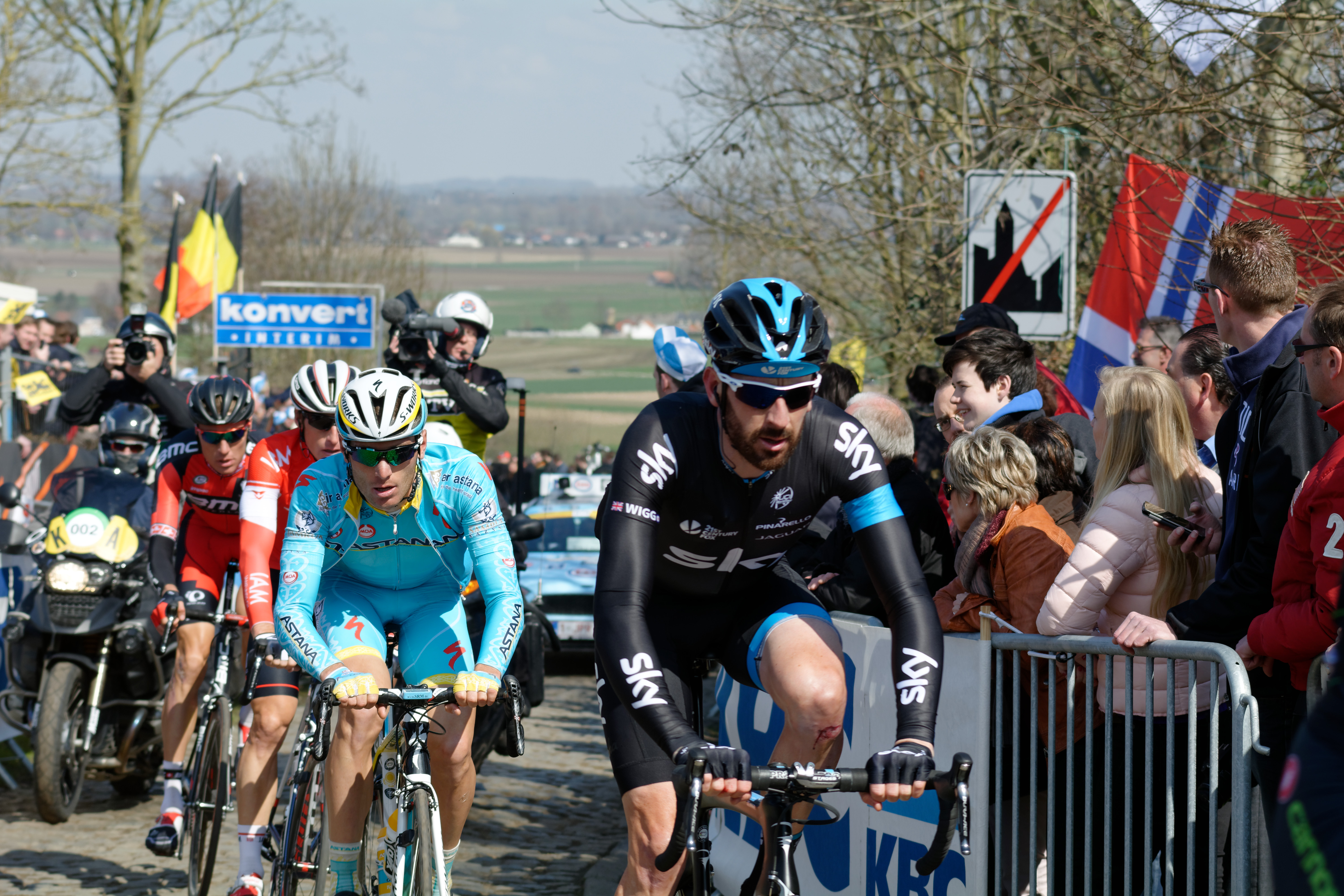
Bradley Wiggins leads a small group at Oude Kwaremont.

The race started with a small delay caused by a farmers' strike. When racing got under way, five riders broke free of the pack after 20 kilometres (12 miles): Jesse Sergent (Trek Factory Racing), Damien Gaudin (AG2R La Mondiale), Ralf Matzka (Bora–Argon 18), Matt Brammeier (MTN–Qhubeka), and Dylan Groenewegen (Team Roompot), while Clément Venturini (Cofidis) was briefly in the front group as well before dropping back. At Sint-Eloois-Winkel, there was a bonus sprint, in which Brammeier won his body weight of 73 kg (161 lb) in local beer. Lars Bak (Lotto–Soudal) and Marco Frapporti (Androni Giocattoli) were able to bridge the gap to the leaders, creating a group of seven at the front. After 60 kilometres (37 miles) of racing, the leaders were about seven minutes clear of the peloton, but the gap started to come down once the riders reached the first climbs.

There were several attacks from the main group when it navigated the area around Oudenaarde, with André Greipel (Lotto–Soudal) featuring in all of them, to no avail. Just before the cobble section of the Haaghoek, a neutral car by supplier Shimano tried to overtake the leading group and hit Sergent, who fell and had to withdraw with a broken collarbone, which later required surgery. With the lead group now down to six riders, they led the main field by three minutes, with Team Sky leading the chase, after their rider Bradley Wiggins had recovered from an earlier crash. Another incident involving a car by Shimano occurred a little later when it crashed into the back of a FDJ team car, which in turn brought down rider Sébastien Chavanel, forcing him to abandon as well.

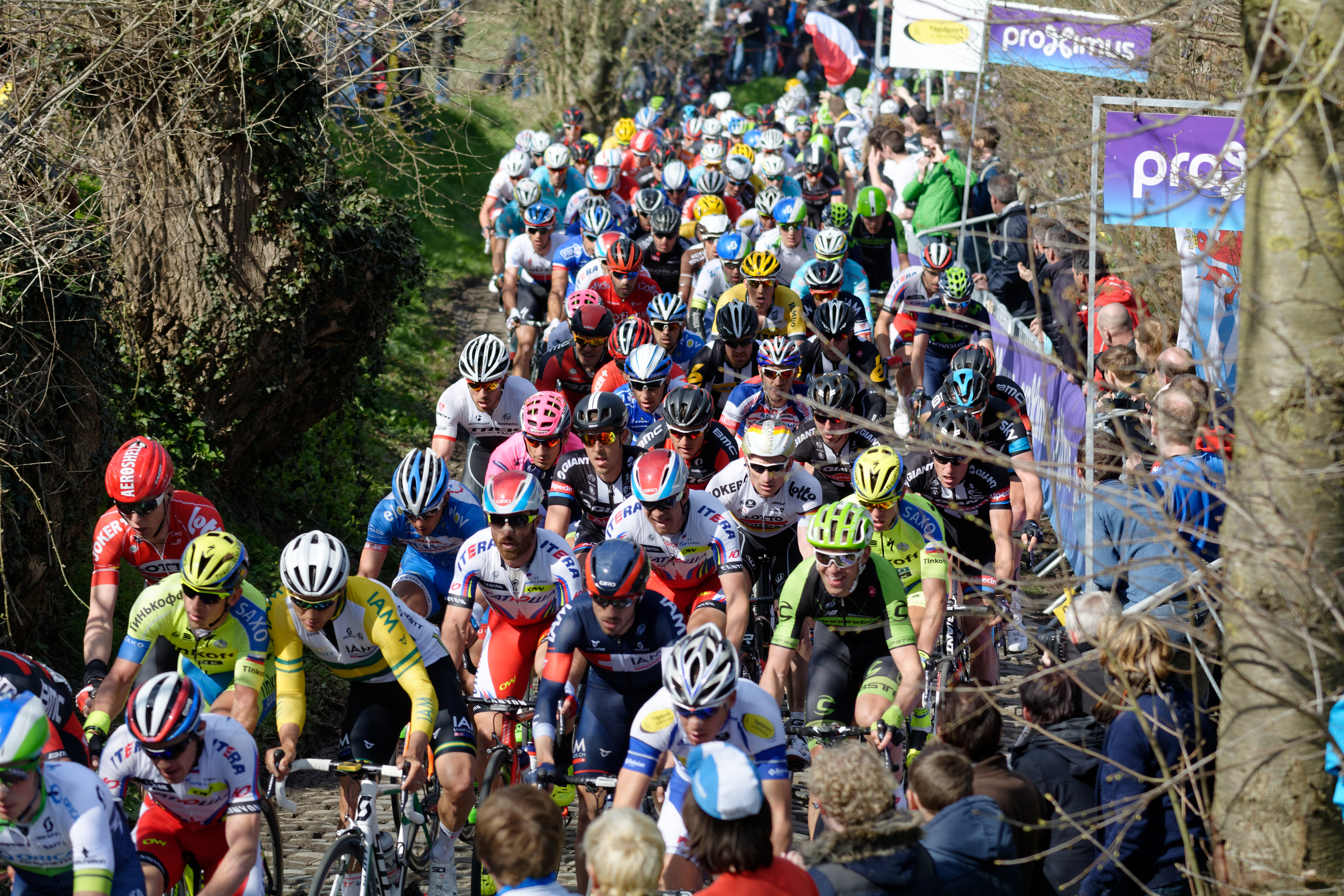
The peloton during the race

On the Kaperij, the tenth climb, Bak and Gaudin were able to break free from their group. On the second ascent of the Oude Kwaremont, Greipel again unsuccessfully attacked, before the main field reached the breakaway at the top of the climb. On the Koppenberg, Greipel again attacked and an increase in tempo caused Wiggins and other riders to lose contact. At the front, Geraint Thomas (Team Sky) and Stijn Devolder (Trek Factory Racing) led the chase to bring back Greipel. Once they reached him, Alexey Lutsenko (Astana) was on the attack after the climb, leading at a maximum of half a minute.

At the climb of the Taaienberg, 36 kilometres (22 miles) from the finish, the favourites came into play. Niki Terpstra was the first to move, with Greg Van Avermaet following after crossing the top, soon followed by a larger group. On the third and final lap of the course, Lutsenko attacked the 26-rider strong group again, joined by Van Avermaet and Nelson Oliveira (Lampre–Merida). They were caught before the Kruisberg, soon followed by an attack by Terpstra and Alexander Kristoff. The two created a thirty-second lead and held it to the finish, even with a counter-attack from Van Avermaet and Peter Sagan late on. Terpstra did not contribute to the pace making over the last kilometre, trying to use Kristoff's slipstream to win a sprint. This proved unsuccessful however, as Kristoff took the second monument victory of his career, outsprinting Terpstra to the line. He became the first Norwegian to win the race.

== Post-race ==
Kristoff was delighted with his win, saying: "I'm really happy to win, it's a really good feeling [...] My family is here today, and it was a big dream and my big goal this season and I managed to do it." On his run-in to the finish line with Terpstra, he commented: "At the end, I came with Niki, and he didn't really want to work with me, but I understand that. In the end I could still beat him." Geraint Thomas was disappointed with his performance, tweeting after the race that he "just lacked the legs of last weekend", referring to his E3 Harelbeke victory.

The magazine Cycling Weekly commented on the race by criticising the route as "more attritional [...] than it is tactical", citing the lack of attacks and the teams' reluctance to send riders into break-aways. Reporter Stephen Puddicombe also criticised Niki Terpstra for not attacking Kristoff before the finish, writing: "Did Terpstra really believe he had any hope of winning the two-man sprint against one of the quickest finishers in the world?"

== Results ==
	Cyclist	Team	Time	UCI World Tour Points
1	Alexander Kristoff (NOR)	Team Katusha	6h 26' 32"	100
2	Niki Terpstra (NED)	Etixx–Quick-Step	+ 0"	80
3	Greg Van Avermaet (BEL)	BMC Racing Team	+ 7"	70
4	Peter Sagan (SVK)	Tinkoff–Saxo	+ 16"	60
5	Tiesj Benoot (BEL)	Lotto–Soudal	+ 36"	50
6	Lars Boom (NED)	Astana	+ 36"	40
7	John Degenkolb (GER)	Team Giant–Alpecin	+ 49"	30
8	Jürgen Roelandts (BEL)	Lotto–Soudal	+ 49"	20
9	Zdeněk Štybar (CZE)	Etixx–Quick-Step	+ 49"	10
10	Martin Elmiger (SUI)	IAM Cycling	+ 49"	4
