= 2018 Tour of Flanders =

Cycling race

2018 UCI World Tour, race 13 of 37
- Event poster with previous winner Philippe Gilbert

Race details
- Dates: 1 April 2018
- Stages: 1
- Distance: 264.7 km (164.5 mi)
- Winning time: 6h 21' 25"

Results
| | Winner | Niki Terpstra (NED) | (Quick-Step Floors) |
| | Second | Mads Pedersen (DEN) | (Trek–Segafredo) |
| | Third | Philippe Gilbert (BEL) | (Quick-Step Floors) |

The 2018 Tour of Flanders (Dutch: Ronde van Vlaanderen 2018) was a road cycling one-day race that took place on 1 April 2018 in Belgium. It was the 102nd edition of the Tour of Flanders and the thirteenth event of the 2018 UCI World Tour.

Quick-Step Floors rider Niki Terpstra became the first Dutch rider since Adri van der Poel in 1986 to win the Tour of Flanders, having gone clear on the Kruisberg climb. Terpstra remained clear over the remaining 25 kilometres (16 miles), finishing 12 seconds ahead of Trek–Segafredo's Mads Pedersen, while the podium was completed by defending race-winner Philippe Gilbert, also for Quick-Step Floors.

== Teams ==
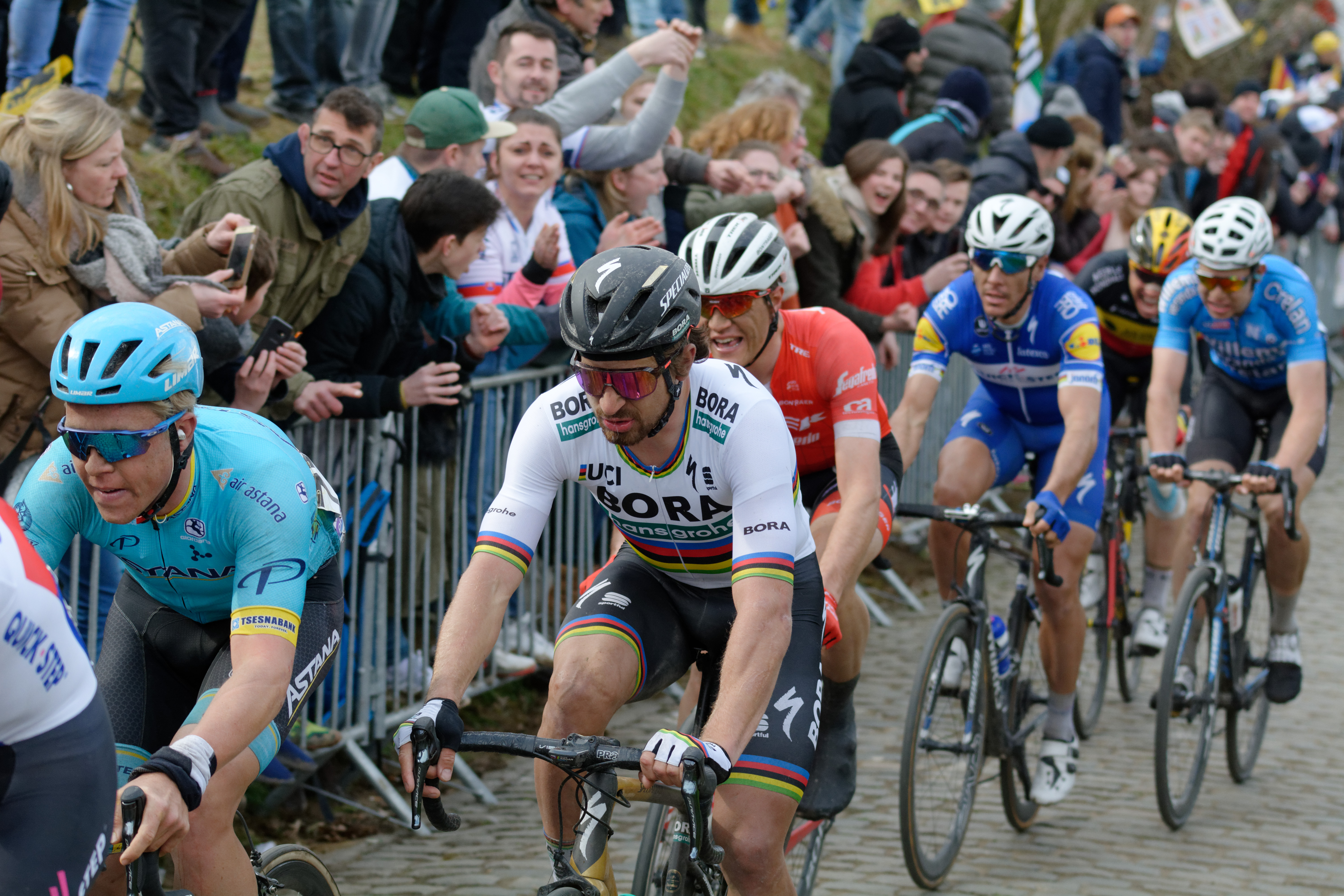
A group containing (from left to right) Michael Valgren, Peter Sagan, Jasper Stuyven, Philippe Gilbert, Oliver Naesen, and Wout van Aert during the race

As the Tour of Flanders was a UCI World Tour event, all eighteen UCI WorldTeams were invited automatically and obliged to enter a team in the race. Seven UCI Professional Continental teams competed, completing the 25-team peloton.

UCI WorldTeams

- AG2R La Mondiale
- Astana
- Bahrain–Merida
- BMC Racing Team
- Bora–Hansgrohe
- EF Education First–Drapac p/b Cannondale
- Team Dimension Data
- Team Katusha–Alpecin
- LottoNL–Jumbo
- Lotto–Soudal
- Movistar Team
- Mitchelton–Scott
- Quick-Step Floors
- Team Sky
- Team Sunweb
- Trek–Segafredo
- UAE Team Emirates
- Groupama–FDJ

UCI Professional Continental teams

- Cofidis
- Roompot–Nederlandse Loterij
- Sport Vlaanderen–Baloise
- Vérandas Willems–Crelan
- Vital Concept
- Wanty–Groupe Gobert
- WB Aqua Protect Veranclassic

== Results ==
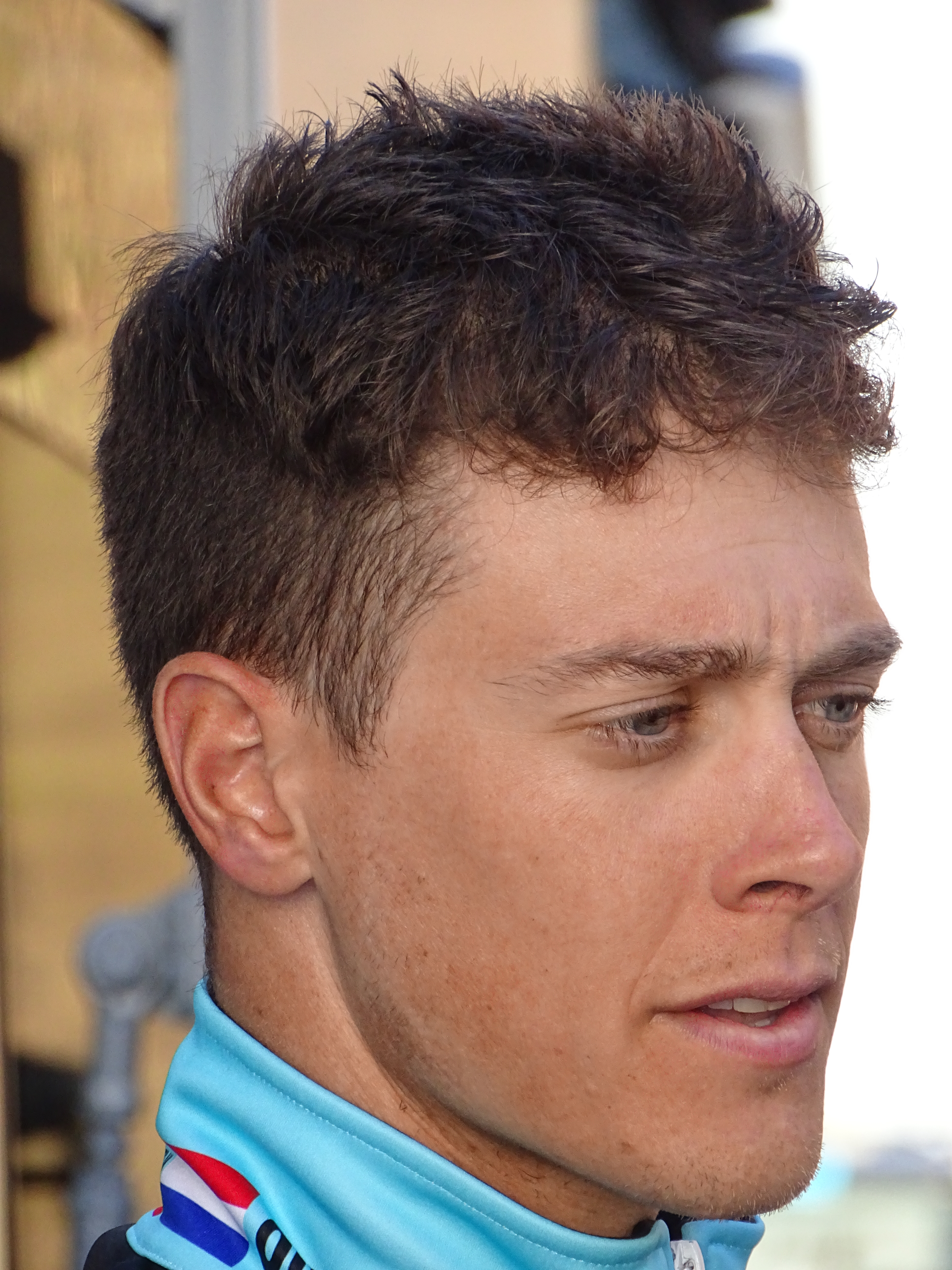
Niki Terpstra became the first male Dutch winner in 32 years.

Result
| Rank | Rider | Team | Time |
|---|---|---|---|
| 1 | Niki Terpstra (NED) | Quick-Step Floors | 6h 21' 25" |
| 2 | Mads Pedersen (DEN) | Trek–Segafredo | + 12" |
| 3 | Philippe Gilbert (BEL) | Quick-Step Floors | + 17" |
| 4 | Michael Valgren (DEN) | Astana | + 20" |
| 5 | Greg Van Avermaet (BEL) | BMC Racing Team | + 25" |
| 6 | Peter Sagan (SVK) | Bora–Hansgrohe | + 25" |
| 7 | Jasper Stuyven (BEL) | Trek–Segafredo | + 25" |
| 8 | Tiesj Benoot (BEL) | Lotto–Soudal | + 25" |
| 9 | Wout van Aert (BEL) | Vérandas Willems–Crelan | + 25" |
| 10 | Zdeněk Štybar (CZE) | Quick-Step Floors | + 25" |
