= Jelle Wallays =

Belgian cyclist

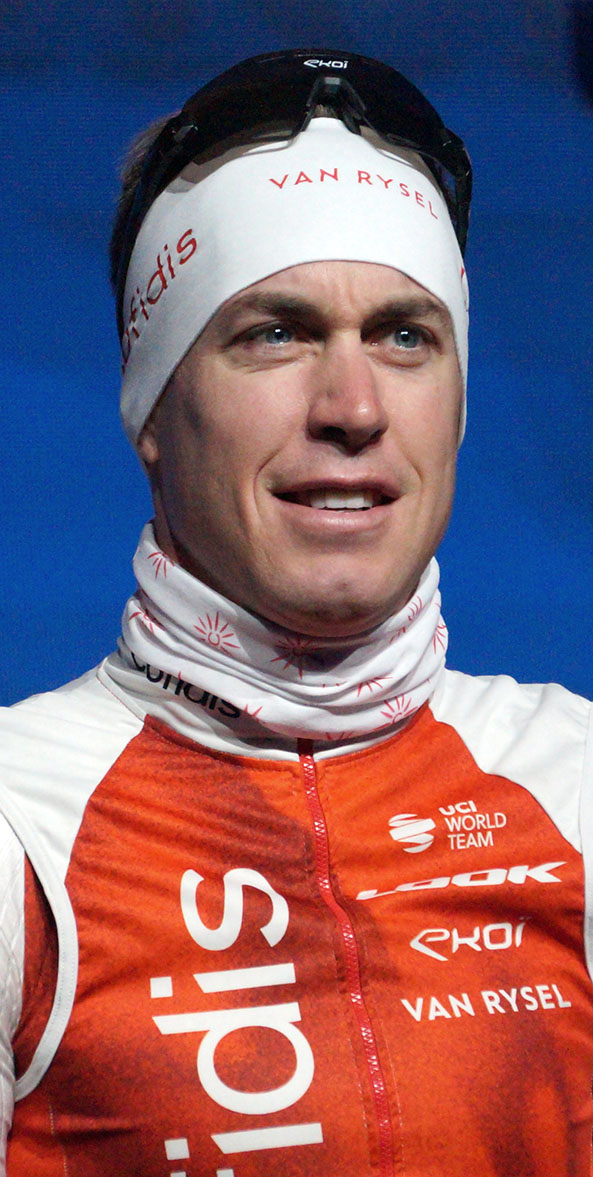
- Wallays in 2023

Personal information
- Born: 11 May 1989 (age 37) Roeselare, West Flanders, Belgium
- Height: 1.85 m (6 ft 1 in)
- Weight: 77 kg (170 lb)

Cycling career
- Sport: Cycling
- Current team: Retired
- Discipline: Road
- Role: Rider
- Rider type: Classics specialist

Amateur teams
- 2008–2010: Beveren 2000
- 2010: Topsport Vlaanderen–Mercator (stagiaire)

Professional teams
- 2011–2015: Topsport Vlaanderen–Mercator
- 2016–2020: Lotto–Soudal
- 2021–2023: Cofidis

Major wins
- Grand Tours Vuelta a España 1 individual stage (2018) One-day races and Classics Paris–Tours (2014, 2019) Dwars door Vlaanderen (2015)

Jelle Wallays (born 11 May 1989) is a Belgian former road cyclist, who competed as a professional from 2011 to 2023.

== Career ==
Jelle Wallays is the brother and nephew of racing cyclists Jens Wallays and Luc Wallays. He was coached by his uncle in his early racing career and competed in his first race at the age of 14. The start of his first year as a professional in 2011 was marred by a knee injury, however a few weeks after returning to competition he took the best result of his season at the Belgian National Road Race Championships, where he finished third behind Philippe Gilbert and Gianni Meersman.

A winner of the Paris–Tours Espoirs in 2010, Wallays won the 2014 Paris–Tours having been in a breakaway that went in the opening kilometres of the 237.5 km (147.6 mi) race, making him the only rider to win the under-23 and elite men's editions of Paris–Tours. He added a second victory in the race in 2019.

In 2015, he won the Dwars door Vlaanderen by attacking a group of three other riders a kilometre away from the finish line.

Wallays joined Lotto–Soudal for the 2016 season, with a focus on working as part of the team's sprint train. He was named in the startlist for the 2016 Vuelta a España.

In October 2020, Wallays signed with the Cofidis team for the 2021 season.

== Major results ==
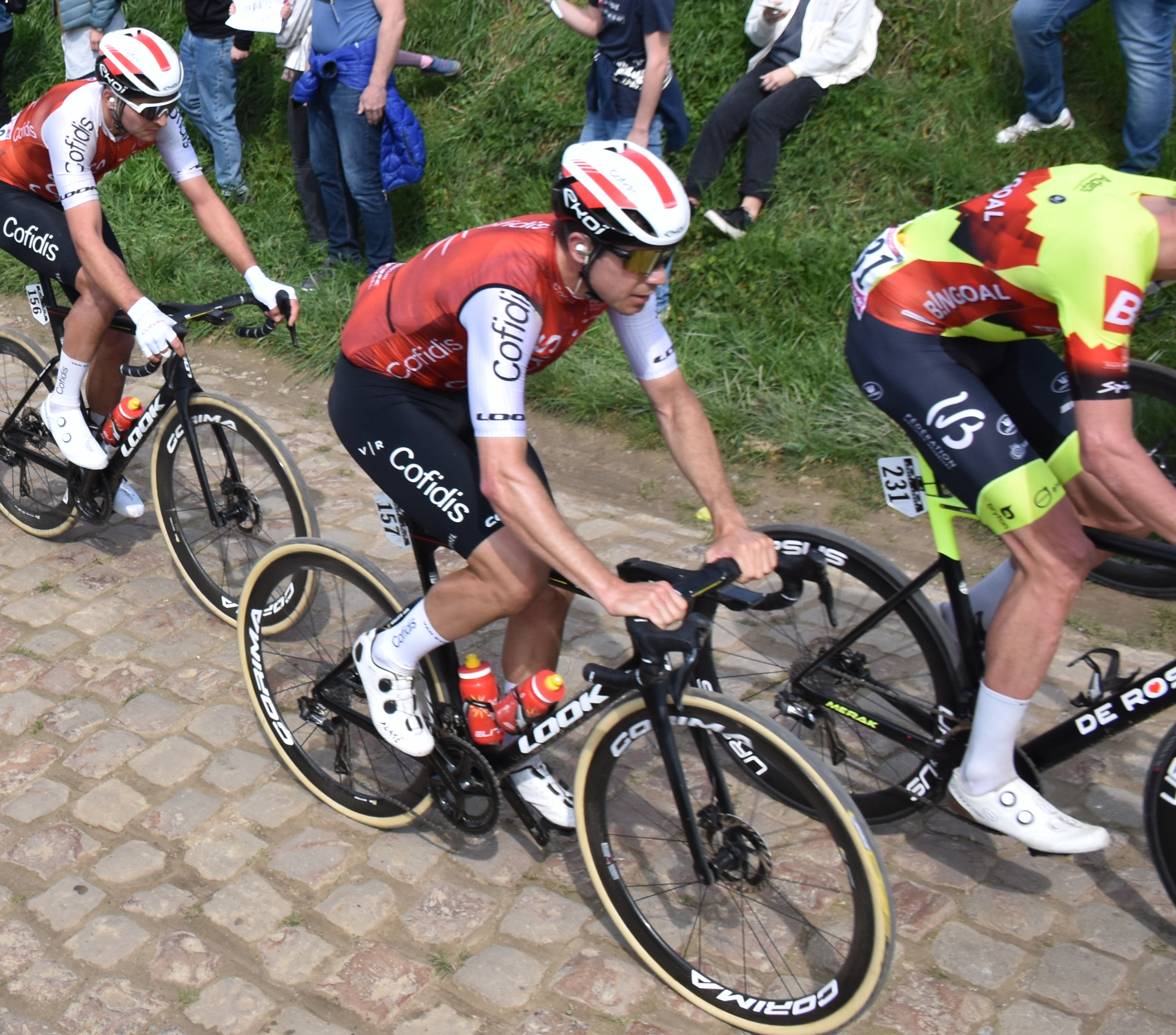
Paris-Roubaix 2023 – Secteur pavé de Quiévy à Saint-Python – N° 157 Jelle Walley.

2007
1st Stage 3b Course de la Paix Juniors
4th Omloop Mandel-Leie-Schelde
2009
3rd Overall Kreiz Breizh Elites
5th Road race, National Under-23 Road Championships
5th Paris–Roubaix Espoirs
8th Overall Mi–Août Bretonne
2010
1st Grand Prix Criquielion
1st Paris–Tours Espoirs
5th Omloop Het Nieuwsblad Beloften
7th Circuit de Wallonie
8th Ronde van Vlaanderen Beloften
2011
3rd Road race, National Road Championships
4th Kattekoers
5th Internationale Wielertrofee Jong Maar Moedig
7th Overall Tour of Britain
10th Grote Prijs Stad Zottegem
2012
7th Grote Prijs Jef Scherens
9th Overall Tour de Wallonie
2013
1st Stage 1 World Ports Classic
4th Internationale Wielertrofee Jong Maar Moedig
7th Overall Driedaagse van West-Vlaanderen
7th Grote Prijs Stad Geel
7th Grote Prijs Jef Scherens
8th Overall Post Danmark Rundt
2014
1st Paris–Tours
1st Omloop van het Houtland
3rd Internationale Wielertrofee Jong Maar Moedig
7th Overall Danmark Rundt
7th Ronde van Drenthe
9th Druivenkoers Overijse
10th Chrono des Nations
2015
1st Dwars door Vlaanderen
1st Grand Prix Criquielion
1st Duo Normand (with Victor Campenaerts)
4th Overall Tour de Luxembourg
7th Schaal Sels
8th Overall Ster ZLM Toer
2016
1st Grand Prix Pino Cerami
4th Dwars door het Hageland
9th Overall Driedaagse van West-Vlaanderen
2018
1st Stage 18 Vuelta a España
1st Stage 6 Vuelta a San Juan
4th Tacx Pro Classic
2019
1st Paris–Tours
9th Overall ZLM Tour
2020
8th Antwerp Port Epic

=== Grand Tour general classification results timeline ===
Grand Tour	2016	2017	2018	2019	2020	2021	2022	2023
Giro d'Italia	Has not contested during his career							
Tour de France	—	—	—	—	—	131	—	—
Vuelta a España	92	151	143	144	—	—	—	

Legend
—	Did not compete
DNF	Did not finish
