= Luke Rowe =

Welsh racing cyclist

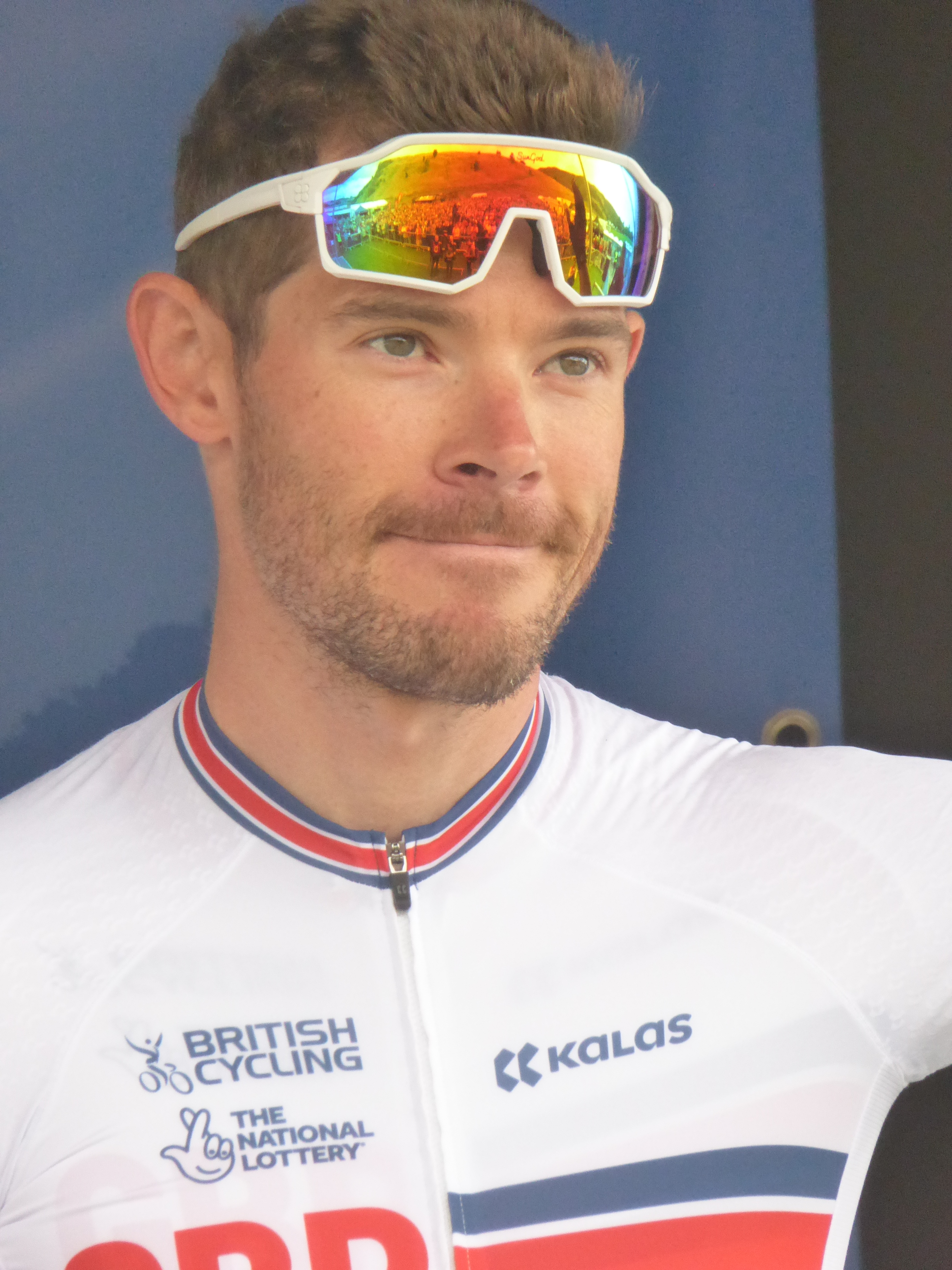
- Rowe at the 2023 UCI Road World Championships

Personal information
- Full name: Luke Rowe
- Nickname: Rowey
- Born: 10 March 1990 (age 36) Cardiff, Wales
- Height: 1.85 m (6 ft 1 in)
- Weight: 72 kg (159 lb; 11 st 5 lb)

Cycling career
- Sport: Cycling
- Current team: Decathlon CMA CGM Team
- Disciplines: Road; Track
- Role: Rider (retired); Directeur sportif
- Rider type: Classics specialist; Domestique; Road captain

Amateur teams
- Maindy Flyers
- Cardiff Ajax CC
- 2006: Glendene CC / Bike Trax
- 2007–2008: Recycling.co.uk (junior)
- 2009–2011: 100% ME

Professional team
- 2012–2024: Team Sky

Managerial team
- 2025–: Decathlon–AG2R La Mondiale

Luke Rowe (born 10 March 1990) is a British former racing cyclist from Wales, who rode professionally for Team Sky and its later iterations between 2012 and 2024. Largely deployed as a domestique during his professional career, Rowe took two wins – stage victories at the 2012 Tour of Britain and the 2017 Herald Sun Tour.

Rowe represented Wales at the Commonwealth Games at four consecutive Games between 2010 and 2022, and was also a team member of five consecutive Tour de France victories by Team Sky/Team INEOS riders between 2015 and 2019, which included him being the lanterne rouge of the 2017 Tour de France.

Following his retirement from the peloton in 2024, Rowe became a directeur sportif with UCI WorldTeam Decathlon CMA CGM Team.

== Career ==
=== Early career ===
Born in Cardiff, Rowe began racing at a young age, initially riding with his parents on a tandem. He began to enjoy cycling and became a member of the Maindy Flyers, based at Maindy Centre, and as a junior, he was a member of British Cycling's Olympic Development Programme. In 2007, Rowe signed an initial one-year contract with UCI Continental team Recycling.co.uk, but could not ride UCI races with the team as he was still a junior. He made his European debut as a member of the junior team pursuit squad who took the gold medal at the UEC European Track Championships in Germany, and later in the year, he won the elite British National Madison Championships with Adam Blythe. He remained with the team into his final junior year in 2008, winning a silver medal in the junior road race at the UEC European Road Championships in Italy, and two medals at the UEC European Track Championships in Poland – gold in the madison with Mark Christian and silver in the team pursuit.

For 2009, Rowe joined the British Cycling Academy and its 100% ME teams on the road and the track. During his first season in the British Cycling Academy, Rowe won the ZLM Tour one-day race held as part of the UCI Under 23 Nations' Cup, and finished second in the British National Madison Championships with Geraint Thomas. The following year, he won the Gran Premio di Poggiana one-day race, and the British National Madison Championships with Mark Christian, as well as making his first appearance for Wales at the Commonwealth Games, finishing ninth in the road race in Delhi. He won the ZLM Tour for the second time in three years in 2011, as well as winning a stage of the Thüringen Rundfahrt der U23, and he defended his British National Madison Championships title – partnering Peter Kennaugh this time around.

=== Team Sky (2012–2024) ===
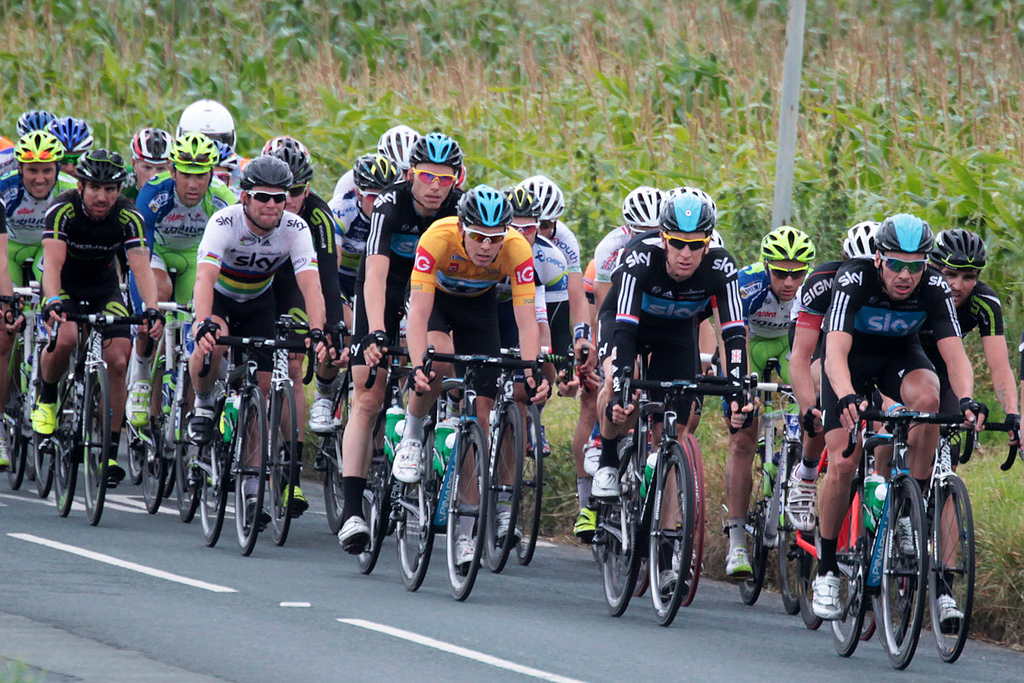
Rowe (in gold) at the 2012 Tour of Britain, wearing the leader's jersey during the second stage. Rowe won the race's first stage for his first professional victory.

Rowe joined Team Sky for the 2012 season as a neo-pro, having signed an initial two-year deal. He took his first professional victory that September by winning the opening stage of the Tour of Britain, avoiding a crash inside the final 2 kilometres (1.2 miles) that delayed several sprinters. At the end of the month, Rowe and Alex Dowsett placed second at the Duo Normand, behind Luke Durbridge and Svein Tuft. Rowe made his Grand Tour debut at the 2013 Vuelta a España, but withdrew from the race before the final rest day. In December 2013, Rowe signed a contract extension with Team Sky. Rowe represented Wales at the Commonwealth Games for the second consecutive edition in 2014, and finished sixth in the road race in Glasgow, won by teammate Geraint Thomas. Rowe rode the 2014 Vuelta a España, and helped Chris Froome to finish second overall.

Rowe enjoyed a strong start to the 2015 season with fourth place at the Cadel Evans Great Ocean Road Race and seventh overall at the Tour of Qatar. Rowe then had a breakthrough classics campaign, placing ninth in Omloop Het Nieuwsblad (won by teammate Ian Stannard), thirteenth in E3 Harelbeke (won by teammate Thomas), and eighth in Paris–Roubaix, ten places ahead of Bradley Wiggins, who was riding his final race for Team Sky. He was selected in Team Sky's squad for the Tour de France, becoming the third Welsh rider to compete in the race after Colin Lewis and Thomas. Froome ultimately won the race for the second successive year, with Rowe predominantly marshalling the breakaway compositions at the front of the peloton, along with Stannard. Later in the season, Rowe signed a three-year contract extension with the team, until the end of the 2018 season. In 2016, Rowe placed fourth at Omloop Het Nieuwsblad, having initiated a five-man breakaway with around 60 kilometres (37 miles) remaining that held to the finish. Later in the year, Rowe was Team Sky's highest-placed rider at the Tour of Flanders – finishing in fifth place – before supporting Froome to a third consecutive Tour de France win.

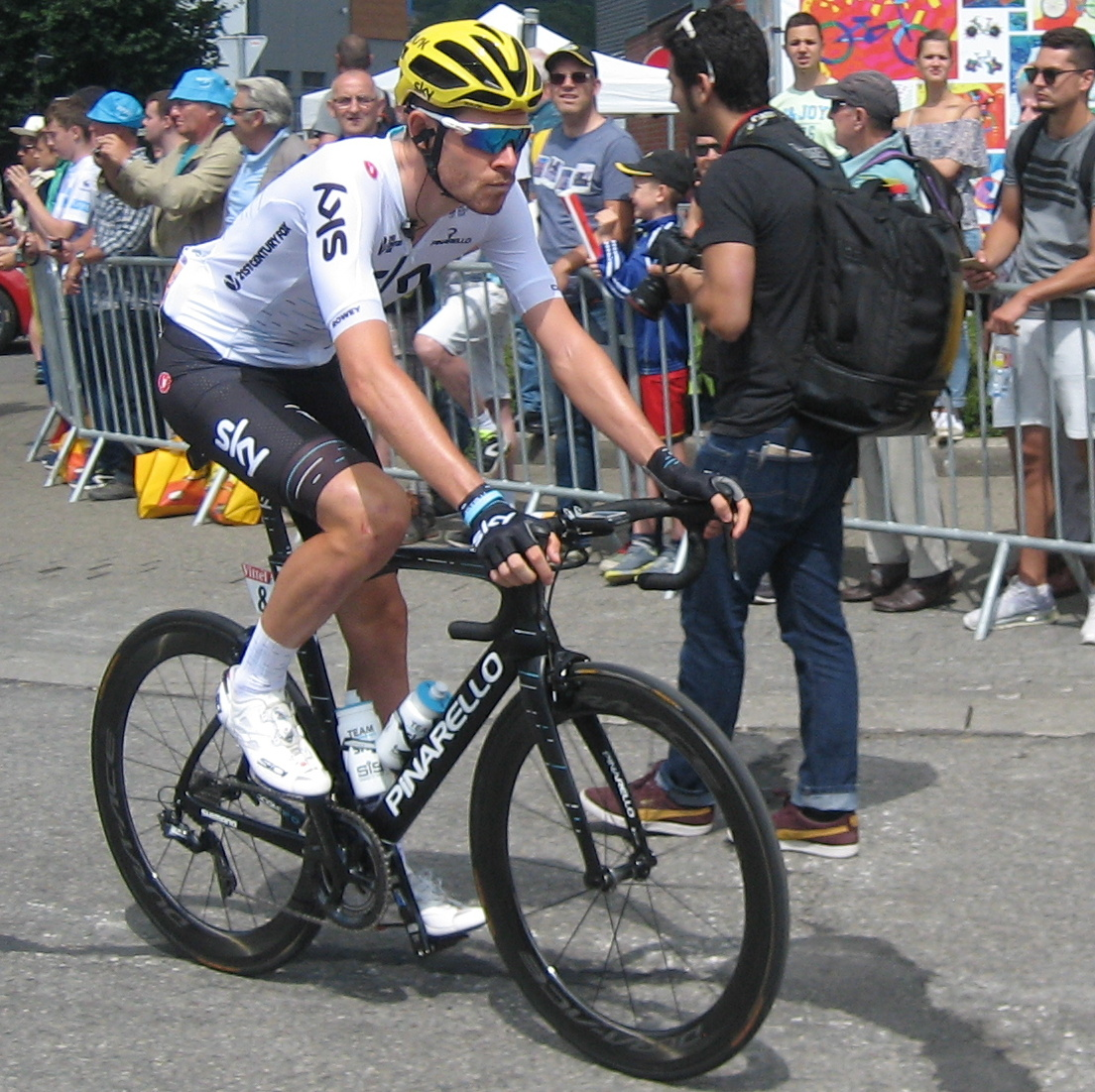
Rowe at the 2017 Tour de France, where he finished as the lanterne rouge of the race, and rode in support of Chris Froome's overall victory

After a fifth-place finish at the 2017 Cadel Evans Great Ocean Road Race, Rowe took his second professional victory with a win on the second stage of the Herald Sun Tour; having been a part of a ten-man breakaway, Rowe followed a move by Tanner Putt inside the final 20 kilometres (12 miles) before dropping Putt and soloing to a 33-second victory over Conor Dunne. He also placed highly in both races of the Belgian "Opening Weekend", finishing sixth at Omloop Het Nieuwsblad and third at Kuurne–Brussels–Kuurne. He was selected for a third consecutive Tour de France, with teammate Froome looking for a fourth consecutive win at the race; on the opening stage, he broke a rib in a crash, but rode on and ultimately finished the race as the lanterne rouge, having finished as the last-placed of the 167 riders in the general classification, topped by Froome. The following month, Rowe fractured the tibia and fibula in his right leg, when he jumped into shallow water while whitewater rafting at his brother's stag party in Prague.

Having feared he would be unlikely to race for up to a year, Rowe returned to racing earlier than expected, in February 2018 at the Abu Dhabi Tour, having originally planned to return for the Commonwealth Games. He was disqualified at the Tour of Flanders for illegally riding on a bike path during the race, but was a road captain for a fourth successive overall win by a Team Sky rider at the Tour de France – this time for his fellow Welshman Thomas. That October, Rowe signed a three-year contract extension, which tied him to the team until the end of the 2021 season. In 2019, Rowe took sixth-place finishes in the Cadel Evans Great Ocean Road Race and Dwars door Vlaanderen one-day races, and he also placed second on a stage of the Herald Sun Tour – as part of a 1–2 finish for Team Sky, behind Owain Doull. He was also part of a fifth successive overall win for the team at the Tour de France, with Egan Bernal winning the general classification; Rowe was ultimately disqualified from the race, following an altercation with Tony Martin during stage seventeen.

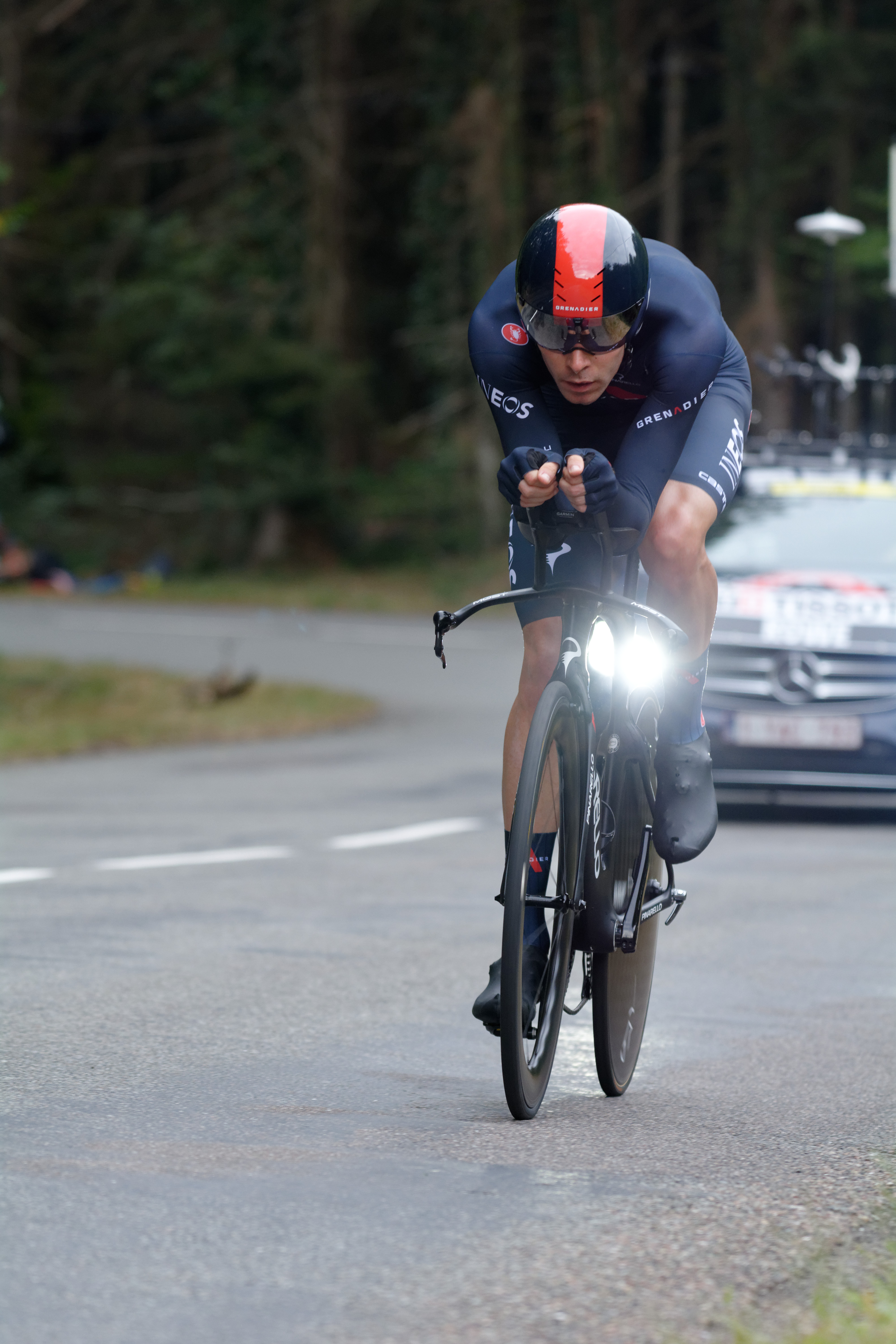
Rowe at the 2020 Tour de France

In February 2020, Rowe signed a two-year contract extension with the team, now renamed as Team INEOS, until the end of the 2023 season. During the COVID-19 pandemic in Wales, which suspended racing from March until July, Rowe provided a replacement bicycle to an NHS key worker, whose bicycle had been stolen from outside the University Hospital of Wales. With none of the Team INEOS riders being in overall contention at the Tour de France, Rowe formed part of the breakaway on stage nineteen, ultimately finishing seventh on the stage to Champagnole. Over the following three seasons, Rowe did not record any top-ten individual finishes, although he did feature in the breakaway at the 2021 Paris–Roubaix and 2022 Bretagne Classic Ouest-France races on the UCI World Tour.

In October 2023, he signed a new two-year deal with the team, again renamed as INEOS Grenadiers, until the end of the 2025 season. At the start of the 2024 season, Rowe featured in the breakaway on the final stage of Tirreno–Adriatico – on his 34th birthday – but crashed out of the E3 Saxo Classic later in March, suffering a concussion in the process. In May, Rowe announced that he would retire from professional cycling at the end of the year, citing that the concussion had been a factor in his decision; he expressed his dream to end his career at the Tour of Britain that September – however, this did not come to fruition.

=== Post-competitive career ===
In October 2024 it was announced that Rowe would join Decathlon–AG2R La Mondiale as a directeur sportif from the start of the 2025 season.

== Personal life ==
Rowe is married, with two children. His father, Courtney Rowe, coached the Paralympian Simon Richardson, while his brother Matthew Rowe and his sister-in-law Dani Rowe also competed professionally. Along with his former teammate Geraint Thomas, Rowe hosts a podcast, Watts Occurring, and the pair have contributed to Eurosport's coverage of professional cycling.

== Major results ==
=== Road ===
2007
1st Points classification, Junior Tour of Wales
2008
2nd Road race, UEC European Junior Championships
2009
1st ZLM Tour
6th Coppa Colli Briantei Internazionale
2010
1st Gran Premio di Poggiana
3rd Gran Premio Industrie del Marmo
4th Gran Premio Palio del Recioto
5th Tour of Flanders U23
6th Overall Tour de Berlin
8th Trofeo Franco Balestra Memorial Metelli
9th Road race, Commonwealth Games
2011
1st ZLM Tour
1st Stage 7 Thüringen Rundfahrt der U23
5th Overall Tour de Normandie
8th La Côte Picarde
9th Overall Olympia's Tour
2012 (1 pro win)
1st Stage 1 Tour of Britain
2nd Duo Normand (with Alex Dowsett)
2013
National Championships

5th Road race
5th Time trial

9th Overall Tour of Qatar
2014
National Championships

4th Road race
4th Time trial

6th Road race, Commonwealth Games
2015
1st Stage 1 (TTT) Tour de Romandie
4th Road race, National Championships
4th Cadel Evans Great Ocean Road Race
7th Overall Tour of Qatar
8th Paris–Roubaix
9th Omloop Het Nieuwsblad
2016
4th Omloop Het Nieuwsblad
5th Tour of Flanders
2017 (1)
1st Stage 2 Herald Sun Tour
3rd Kuurne–Brussels–Kuurne
5th Cadel Evans Great Ocean Road Race
6th Omloop Het Nieuwsblad
2018
1st Stage 3 (TTT) Critérium du Dauphiné
1st Stage 1b (TTT) Settimana Internazionale di Coppi e Bartali
2019
6th Dwars door Vlaanderen
6th Cadel Evans Great Ocean Road Race

==== Grand Tour general classification results timeline ====
Grand Tour	2013	2014	2015	2016	2017	2018	2019	2020	2021	2022
Giro d'Italia	Did not contest during his career									
Tour de France	—	—	136	151	167	128	DSQ	129	DNF	106
Vuelta a España	DNF	141	—	—	—	—	—	—	—	—

==== Classics results timeline ====
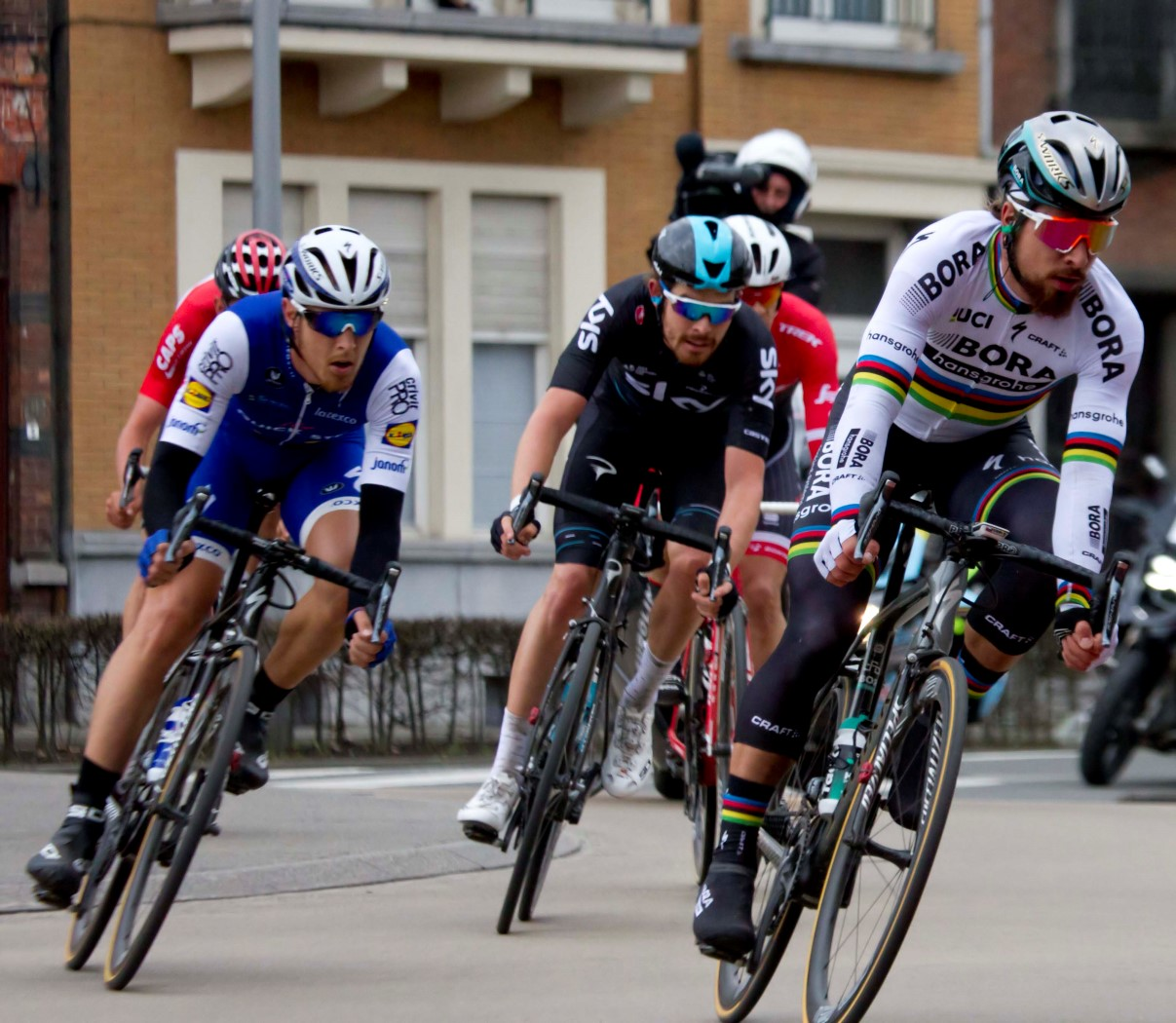
Rowe (centre) recorded his best Classics result with a third-place finish at the 2017 Kuurne–Brussels–Kuurne

Monument	2012	2013	2014	2015	2016	2017	2018	2019	2020	2021	2022	2023	2024
Milan–San Remo	—	—	—	130	91	98	146	103	—	118	85	148	131
Tour of Flanders	—	93	62	50	5	120	DSQ	27	50	DNF	—	95	—
Paris–Roubaix	—	109	31	8	14	DNF	DNF	32	NH	66	102	127	—
Liège–Bastogne–Liège	DNF	—	—	—	—	—	—	—	—	134	—	—	—
Giro di Lombardia	Did not contest during his career												
Classic	2012	2013	2014	2015	2016	2017	2018	2019	2020	2021	2022	2023	2024
Omloop Het Nieuwsblad	—	53	11	9	4	6	—	—	DNF	—	—	122	77
Kuurne–Brussels–Kuurne	—	NH	120	51	84	3	—	—	63	—	—	DNF	89
E3 Harelbeke	—	70	DNF	13	23	15	—	54	NH	—	78	—	DNF
Gent–Wevelgem	—	56	DNF	DNF	22	DNF	—	18	12	—	DNF	—	—
Dwars door Vlaanderen	64	36	66	—	—	—	22	6	NH	—	—	—	—

Legend
—	Did not compete
DNF	Did not finish
DSQ	Disqualified
NH	Not held

=== Track ===
2007
1st Team pursuit, UEC European Junior Championships
1st Madison, National Championships (with Adam Blythe)
2008
UEC European Junior Championships

1st Madison (with Mark Christian)
2nd Team pursuit

1st Derny, National Championships
2009
2nd Madison, National Championships (with Geraint Thomas)
2010
1st Madison, National Championships (with Mark Christian)
2011
1st Madison, National Championships (with Peter Kennaugh)
2012
Revolution Series, Manchester

1st Australian pursuit
1st Scratch
