= 2017 Kuurne–Brussels–Kuurne =

Race details
- Dates: 26 February 2017
- Stages: 1
- Distance: 200.7 km (124.7 mi)
- Winning time: 4h 37' 49"

Results
	Winner	Peter Sagan (SVK)	(Bora–Hansgrohe)
	Second	Jasper Stuyven (BEL)	(Trek–Segafredo)
	Third	Luke Rowe (GBR)	(Team Sky)

The 69th edition of the Kuurne–Brussels–Kuurne cycling classic was held on 26 February 2017. It was part of the 2017 UCI Europe Tour and ranked as a 1.HC event. The route was 200.7 km (125 mi), starting and finishing in Kuurne. It was the second and concluding race of the Belgian opening weekend, the year's first road races in Northwestern Europe, one day after Omloop Het Nieuwsblad.

After finishing second to Greg Van Avermaet in Omloop Het Nieuwsblad, world champion Peter Sagan, from Slovakia, won the race for Bora–Hansgrohe. Sagan and four other riders – Belgians Jasper Stuyven (Trek–Segafredo) and Tiesj Benoot (Lotto–Soudal), Italy's Matteo Trentin, riding for the Belgian Quick-Step Floors team, and Team Sky's Luke Rowe from Great Britain – contested a sprint finish, being the survivors of a larger group that broke away from the peloton around the halfway mark of the race, after the Oude Kwaremont.

== Teams ==
Twenty-five teams were invited to start the race. These included fourteen UCI WorldTeams, nine UCI Professional Continental teams and two UCI Continental teams.

UCI WorldTeams

- AG2R La Mondiale
- Astana
- Bahrain–Merida
- BMC Racing Team
- Bora–Hansgrohe
- Cannondale–Drapac
- FDJ
- Team Katusha–Alpecin
- Lotto–Soudal
- LottoNL–Jumbo
- Orica–Scott
- Quick-Step Floors
- Team Sky
- Trek–Segafredo

UCI Professional Continental teams

- Cofidis
- Direct Énergie
- Israel Cycling Academy
- Roompot–Nederlandse Loterij
- Sport Vlaanderen–Baloise
- Vérandas Willems–Crelan
- Wanty–Groupe Gobert
- WB Veranclassic Aqua Protect
- Fortuneo–Vital Concept

UCI Continental teams

- Cibel–Cebon
- Pauwels Sauzen–Vastgoedservice

== Results ==
Result
Rank	Rider	Team	Time
1	Peter Sagan (SVK)	Bora–Hansgrohe	4h 37' 49"
2	Jasper Stuyven (BEL)	Trek–Segafredo	+ 0"
3	Luke Rowe (GBR)	Team Sky	+ 0"
4	Tiesj Benoot (BEL)	Lotto–Soudal	+ 0"
5	Matteo Trentin (ITA)	Quick-Step Floors	+ 0"
6	Arnaud Démare (FRA)	FDJ	+ 6"
7	Greg Van Avermaet (BEL)	BMC Racing Team	+ 6"
8	Oliver Naesen (BEL)	AG2R La Mondiale	+ 6"
9	Zdeněk Štybar (CZE)	Quick-Step Floors	+ 6"
10	Baptiste Planckaert (BEL)	Team Katusha–Alpecin	+ 6"
