= 2017 Omloop Het Nieuwsblad =

Cycling race

2017 UCI World Tour, race 4 of 37
- Logo used in 2017

Race details
- Dates: 25 February 2017
- Stages: 1
- Distance: 198.3 km (123.2 mi)
- Winning time: 4h 55' 06"

Results
	Winner	Greg Van Avermaet (Belgium)	(BMC Racing Team)
	Second	Peter Sagan (Slovakia)	(Bora–Hansgrohe)
	Third	Sep Vanmarcke (Belgium)	(Cannondale–Drapac)

The 2017 Omloop Het Nieuwsblad was a road cycling one-day race that took place on 25 February 2017. It was the 72nd edition of the Omloop Het Nieuwsblad and was the fourth event of the 2017 UCI World Tour. It was the first time that the race was included in the UCI World Tour calendar.

The race was won, from a three-up sprint finish, by Greg Van Avermaet (BMC Racing Team), ahead of the reigning world champion Peter Sagan – riding for Bora–Hansgrohe – and Cannondale–Drapac's Sep Vanmarcke completed the podium, after the three riders broke away from the field in the final quarter of the race.

== Teams ==
As a new event to the UCI World Tour, all UCI WorldTeams were invited to the race, but not obligated to compete in the race. As such, fifteen of the eighteen WorldTeams – all except Team Dimension Data, Movistar Team and UAE Team Emirates – competed in the race. Ten UCI Professional Continental teams competed, completing the 25-team peloton.

UCI WorldTeams

- AG2R La Mondiale
- Astana
- Bahrain–Merida
- BMC Racing Team
- Bora–Hansgrohe
- Cannondale–Drapac
- FDJ
- Team Katusha–Alpecin
- LottoNL–Jumbo
- Lotto–Soudal
- Orica–Scott
- Quick-Step Floors
- Team Sky
- Team Sunweb
- Trek–Segafredo

UCI Professional Continental teams

- Aqua Blue Sport
- Cofidis
- Direct Énergie
- Israel Cycling Academy
- Roompot–Nederlandse Loterij
- Sport Vlaanderen–Baloise
- Vérandas Willems–Crelan
- Wanty–Groupe Gobert
- WB Veranclassic Aqua Protect
- Fortuneo–Vital Concept

== Route ==
After a forced relocation from Sint-Pietersplein to the Citadel Park – the site adjacent to the Kuipke velodrome – for the 2016 Omloop Het Nieuwsblad, the Citadel Park again hosted the start of the race. The finish was once again held on the Emile Claus thoroughfare, close to the starting place.

At 198.3 kilometres (123.2 miles) and with thirteen climbs in the hill zone, the course was challenging and arduous. Additionally, there were several flat stretches of cobbles. After a year's hiatus due to roadworks, the Molenberg returned to the race for its 2017 edition; the Eikenberg was also partially paved for the 2017 race.

=== Categorised climbs and cobbles ===
Climbs and cobbled sections in the 2017 Omloop Het Nieuwsblad
No.	Name	Distance from		Surface	Length (metres)	Gradient (%)	
No.	Name	Start (km)	Finish (km)	Surface	Length (metres)	(ave.)	(max.)
–	Haaghoek	51.4	146.9	cobbles	2000	—	
1	Leberg	54.4	143.9	asphalt	950	4.2%	13.8%
2	Berendries	58.5	139.8	asphalt	940	7%	12.3%
3	Tenbosse	63.4	134.9	asphalt	450	6.9%	8.7%
4	Eikenmolen	68.9	129.4	asphalt	610	5.9%	12.5%
5	Muur van Geraardsbergen	80.7	117.6	cobbles	750	9.3%	19.8%
6	Valkenberg	98.4	99.9	asphalt	540	8.1%	12.8%
–	Haaghoek	107.2	91.1	cobbles	2000	—	
7	Kaperij	117.0	81.3	asphalt	1000	5.5%	9%
8	Kruisberg	128.9	69.4	asphalt & cobbles	1800	4.8%	9%
–	Donderij	133.6	64.7	cobbles	800	—	
9	Taaienberg	138.6	59.7	cobbles	530	6.6%	15.8%
10	Eikenberg	143.9	54.4	cobbles	1200	5.2%	10%
11	Wolvenberg	147.0	51.3	asphalt	645	7.9%	17.3%
–	Ruiterstraat	147.1	51.2	cobbles	800	—	
–	Karel Martelstraat	148.4	49.9	cobbles	1300	—	
–	Holleweg	149.8	48.5	cobbles	350	—	
–	Haaghoek	154.4	43.9	cobbles	2000	—	
12	Leberg	157.4	40.9	asphalt	950	4.2%	13.8%
13	Molenberg	162.9	35.4	cobbles	463	7%	14.2%
–	Paddestraat	167.8	30.5	cobbles	2300	—	
–	Lippenhovestraat	170.5	27.8	cobbles	1300	—	
–	Lange Munte	177.5	20.8	cobbles	2500	—	

== Result ==
Result
Rank	Rider	Team	Time
1	Greg Van Avermaet (BEL)	BMC Racing Team	4h 55' 06"
2	Peter Sagan (SVK)	Bora–Hansgrohe	+ 0"
3	Sep Vanmarcke (BEL)	Cannondale–Drapac	+ 0"
4	Fabio Felline (ITA)	Trek–Segafredo	+ 45"
5	Oscar Gatto (ITA)	Astana	+ 52"
6	Luke Rowe (GBR)	Team Sky	+ 52"
7	Oliver Naesen (BEL)	AG2R La Mondiale	+ 52"
8	Jasper Stuyven (BEL)	Trek–Segafredo	+ 52"
9	Matteo Trentin (ITA)	Quick-Step Floors	+ 56"
10	Adrien Petit (FRA)	Direct Énergie	+ 58"
