= 2016 Omloop Het Nieuwsblad =

2016 UCI Europe Tour
- Event poster with previous winner Ian Stannard

Race details
- Dates: 27 February 2016
- Stages: 1
- Distance: 200.8 km (124.8 mi)
- Winning time: 4h 54' 12"

Results
	Winner	Greg Van Avermaet (BEL)	(BMC Racing Team)
	Second	Peter Sagan (SVK)	(Tinkoff)
	Third	Tiesj Benoot (BEL)	(Lotto–Soudal)

The 71st edition of the Omloop Het Nieuwsblad was held on 27 February 2016. It was won by Belgian Greg Van Avermaet in a five-man sprint before Peter Sagan and Tiesj Benoot.

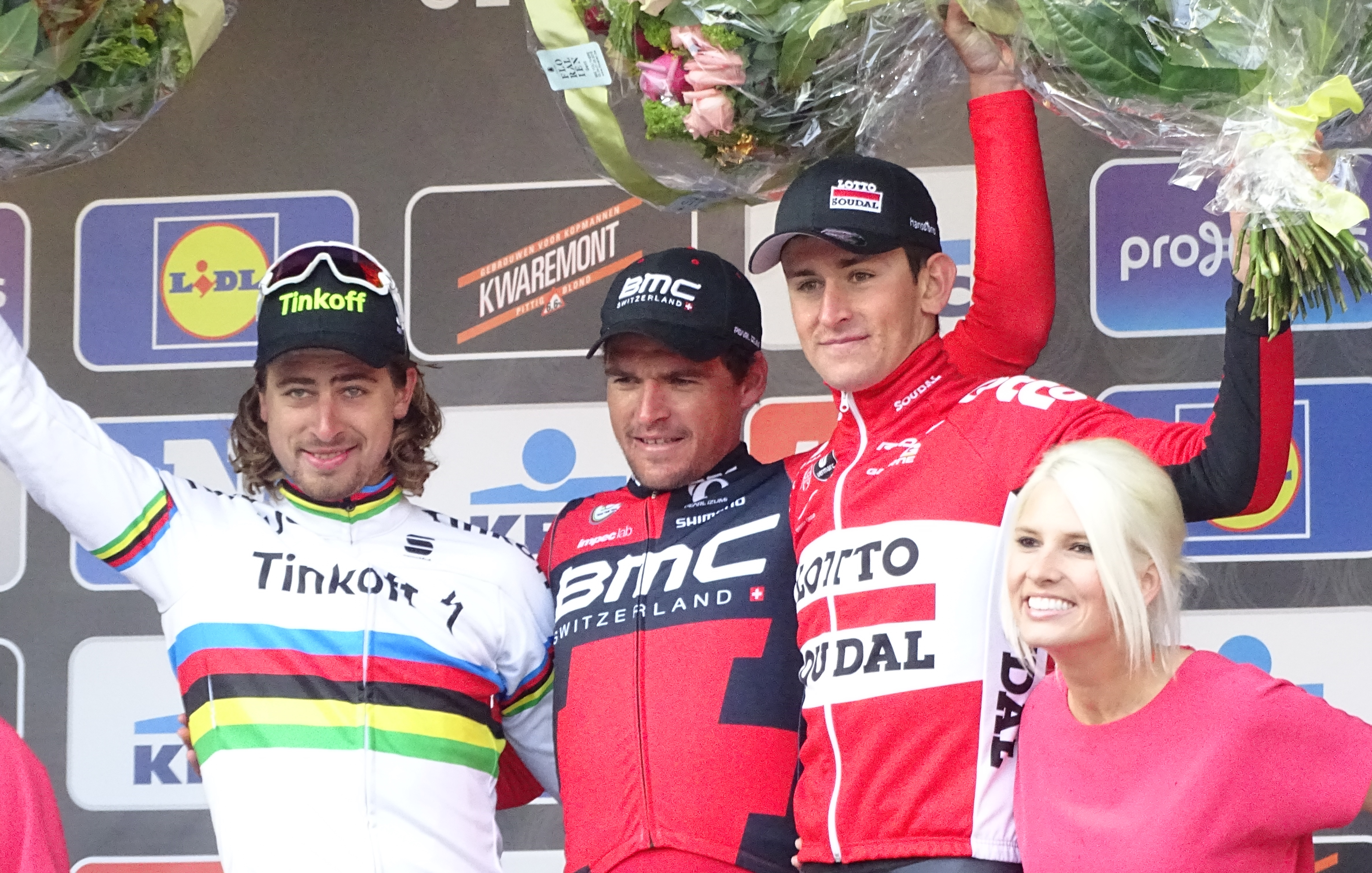
Podium of the race: Peter Sagan, Greg Van Avermaet and Tiesj Benoot

The race started and finished in Ghent, Belgium, covering 200.8 km. The Omloop marked the start of the cobbled classics season in Europe and was rated as a 1.HC event of the 2016 UCI Europe Tour.

== Preview ==
=== Route ===
The Omloop Het Nieuwsblad started in Ghent, East Flanders, and addressed the Flemish Ardennes in the south of the province, featuring numerous short climbs, before returning to Ghent. This edition, organizers needed to find an alternative for the traditional start and finish location on Sint-Pietersplein. (Note: Every seven years, when Easter comes early in the year, Ghent's largest square, Sint-Pietersplein, is booked for the annual Mid-Lent fair.) In 2016 organizers chose Citadel Park, the site adjacent to the Kuipke velodrome, as the start location. The finish was on Emile Claus thoroughfare, close to the starting place.

At 200 kilometres and with a dozen climbs in the hill zone, the course was challenging and arduous. Additionally, there were several flat stretches of cobbles. The race featured one new climb, Boembekeberg, as a replacement for the Molenberg, which was skipped because of road works.

There are thirteen categorized climbs:

Climbs in the 2016 Omloop Het Nieuwsblad
No.	Name	Distance from finish (km)	Road surface	Length (m)	Average gradient (%)	Maximum gradient (%)
1	Leberg	141	asphalt	950	4.2%	13.8%
2	Berendries	137	asphalt	940	7%	12.3%
3	Tenbosse	132	asphalt	450	6.9%	8.7%
4	Eikenmolen	127	asphalt	610	5.9%	12.5%
5	Muur van Geraardsbergen	115	cobbles	1.075	9.3%	19.8%
6	Valkenberg	97	asphalt	540	8.1%	12.8%
7	Kaperij	78	asphalt	1.000	5.5%	9%
8	Kruisberg	67	asphalt/cobbles	950	4.8%	9%
9	Taaienberg	57	cobbles	530	6.6%	15.8%
10	Eikenberg	52	cobbles	1.200	5.2%	10%
11	Wolvenberg	48	asphalt	645	7.9%	17.3%
12	Leberg	38	asphalt	950	4.2%	13.8%
13	Boembeke	32	asphalt	1.200	5%	7%

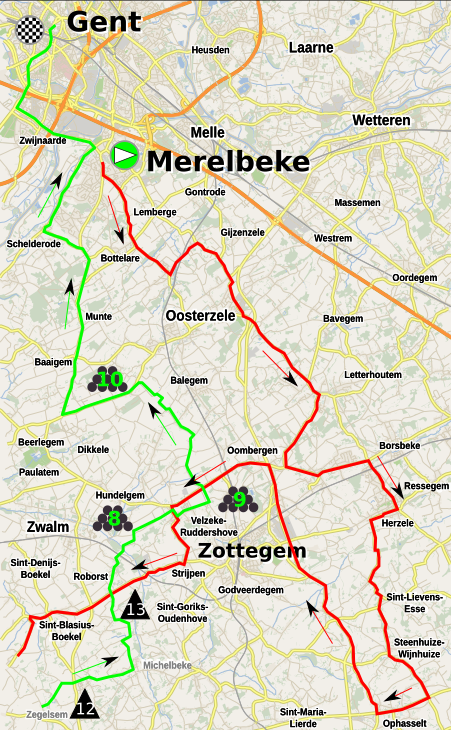
Northern part of the race : Begin of the route (red), final (green)

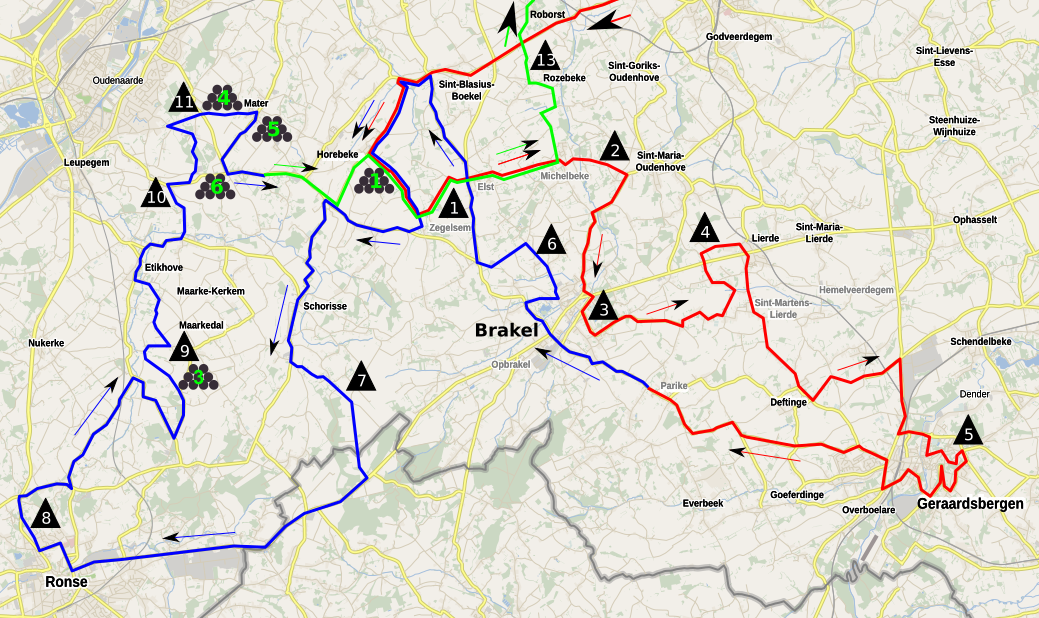
Southern part of the race : Begin of the route (red), intermediate part (blue), final (green)

=== Pre-race favourites ===
Britain's Ian Stannard, the winner of the previous two editions, was not present in this year's event. World champion Peter Sagan was among the key favourites, together with classics specialists Alexander Kristoff, Tom Boonen, Greg Van Avermaet and Philippe Gilbert. Former world time trial champion Tony Martin made a first appearance.

- Peter Sagan (SVK) (Tinkoff)
- Alexander Kristoff (NOR) (Team Katusha)
- Greg Van Avermaet (BEL) (BMC Racing Team)
- Philippe Gilbert (BEL) (BMC Racing Team)
- Tom Boonen (BEL) (Etixx–Quick-Step)
- Tony Martin (GER) (Etixx–Quick-Step)
- Niki Terpstra (NED) (Etixx–Quick-Step)
- Stijn Vandenbergh (BEL) (Etixx–Quick-Step)
- Luke Rowe (GBR) (Team Sky)
- Arnaud Démare (FRA) (FDJ)
- Tiesj Benoot (BEL) (Lotto–Soudal)
- Edward Theuns (BEL) (Trek–Segafredo)

=== Teams ===
25 teams were invited: 12 UCI WorldTeams and 13 continental teams. (Note: As a 1.HC event, the race organizers could invite up to 70% UCI WorldTeams as a total of the line-up.) (Note: Team Giant–Alpecin withdrew at the last moment, because they were unable to line up enough riders, after a severe accident in an early-season training camp left several riders injured.) In total, 199 riders were at the start. (Note: Teams were limited to eight riders, for a maximum field of 200 riders.)

ProTeams

- AG2R La Mondiale
- BMC Racing Team
- Etixx–Quick-Step
- FDJ
- IAM Cycling
- Lotto–Soudal
- Team Katusha
- LottoNL–Jumbo
- Team Sky
- Tinkoff
- Trek–Segafredo
- Orica–GreenEDGE

Professional Continental teams

- Bora–Argon 18
- CCC–Sprandi–Polkowice
- Cofidis
- Direct Énergie
- Nippo–Vini Fantini
- ONE Pro Cycling
- Roompot–Oranje Peloton
- Stölting Service Group
- Topsport Vlaanderen–Baloise
- Verva ActiveJet
- Wanty–Groupe Gobert
- Southeast–Venezuela

Continental teams

- Verandas Willems

== Race report ==
Twelve riders, among which Alexis Gougeard, were in the early breakaway, as Etixx–Quick-Step and Team Katusha held them within range of the peloton. Greg Van Avermaet, Luke Rowe and Tiesj Benoot broke clear on Taaienberg, immediately being joined by Peter Sagan on the descent. The four riders caught the remaining early escapees and dropped them all on the last cobbled sections, except for Gougeard. Powering on to Ghent, the elite group stayed clear until the finish and the race was decided in a five-man sprint. Van Avermaet led out the slightly uphill sprint from afar and sealed his first win of the season. Sagan was second, Benoot third. Jens Debusschere won the sprint for sixth place, nine seconds behind Van Avermaet.

== Results ==
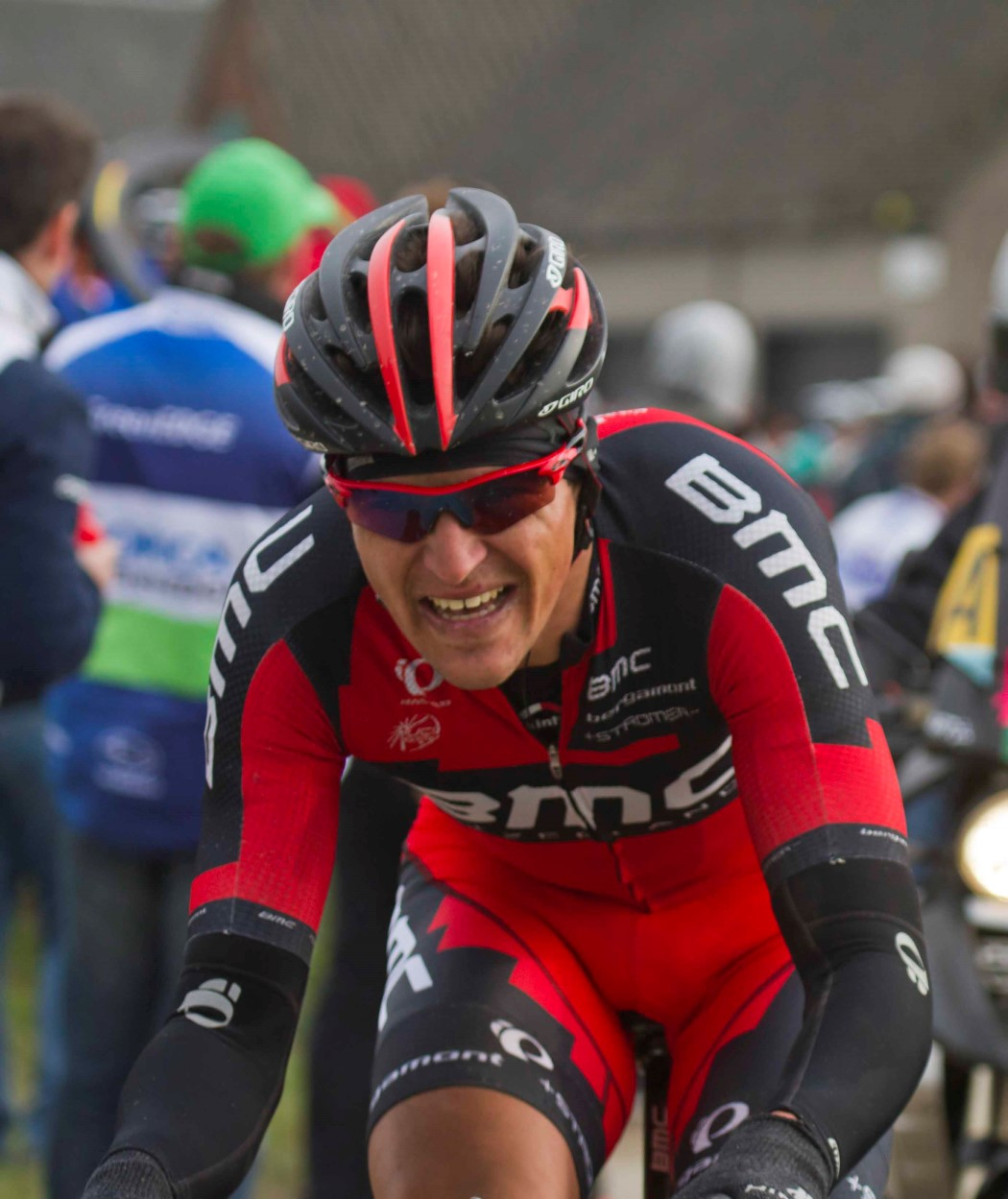
Greg Van Avermaet (pictured in 2013) sealed his first win of 2016 in the Omloop Het Nieuwsblad

Result
Rank	Rider	Team	Time
1	Greg Van Avermaet (BEL)	BMC Racing Team	4h 54' 12"
2	Peter Sagan (SVK)	Tinkoff	+ 0"
3	Tiesj Benoot (BEL)	Lotto–Soudal	+ 0"
4	Luke Rowe (GBR)	Team Sky	+ 0"
5	Alexis Gougeard (FRA)	AG2R La Mondiale	+ 5"
6	Jens Debusschere (BEL)	Lotto–Soudal	+ 9"
7	Adrien Petit (FRA)	Direct Énergie	+ 9"
8	Edward Theuns (BEL)	Trek–Segafredo	+ 9"
9	Jasper Stuyven (BEL)	Trek–Segafredo	+ 9"
10	Mathieu Ladagnous (FRA)	FDJ	+ 9"
