= Greg Van Avermaet =

Belgian cyclist

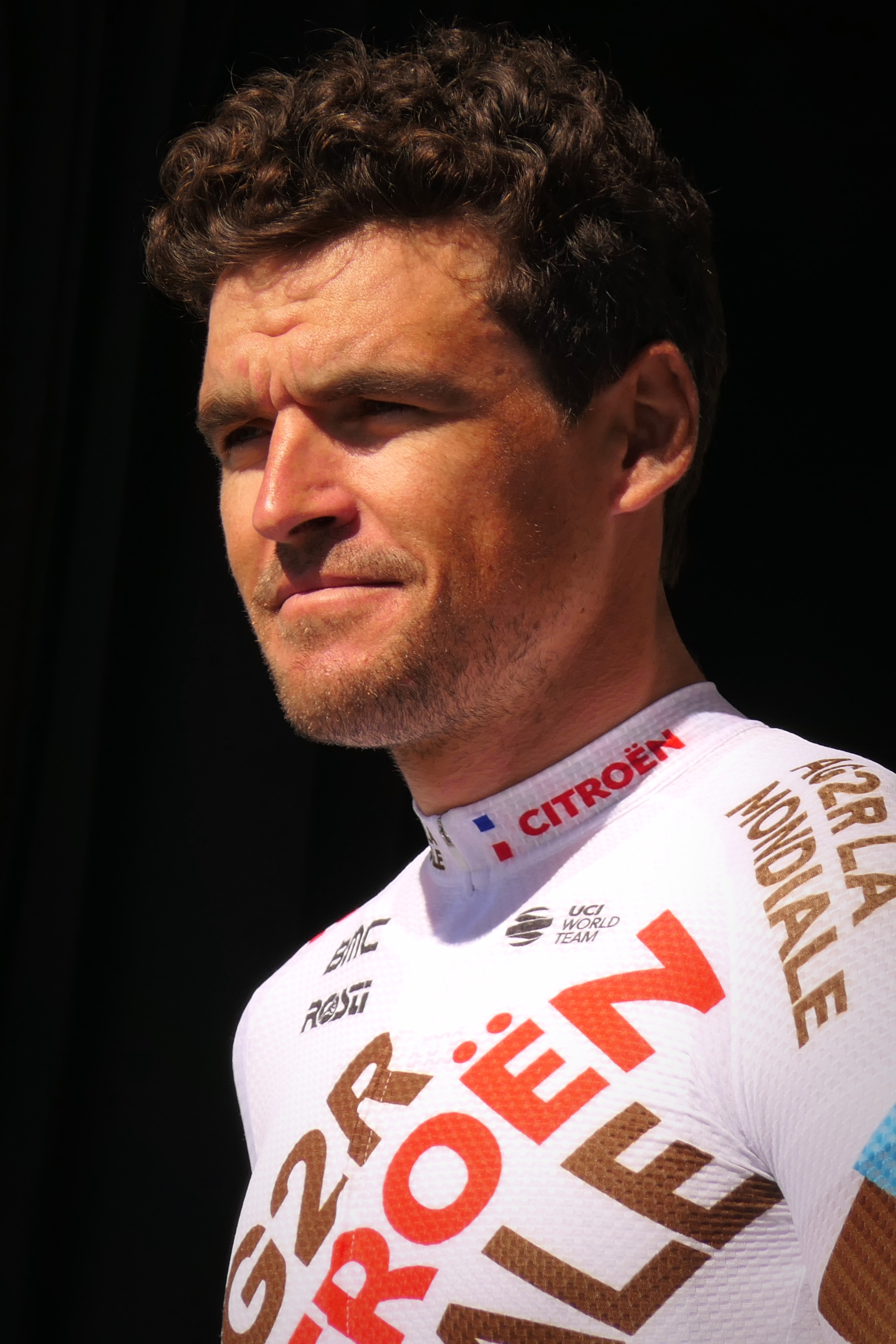
- Van Avermaet, 2022 Paris–Roubaix.

Personal information
- Full name: Greg Van Avermaet
- Nicknames: Avi; GVA; King of Flanders
- Born: 17 May 1985 (age 41) Lokeren, Flanders, Belgium
- Height: 1.81 m (5 ft 11 in)
- Weight: 74 kg (163 lb)

Cycling career
- Sport: Cycling
- Current team: Team Last Dance
- Discipline: Gravel
- Role: Rider
- Rider type: Classics specialist Puncheur

Professional teams
- 2006: Bodysol–Win for Life–Jong Vlaanderen
- 2007–2010: Predictor–Lotto
- 2011–2020: BMC Racing Team
- 2021–2023: AG2R Citroën Team

Major wins
- Grand Tours Tour de France 2 individual stages (2015, 2016) 2 TTT stages (2015, 2018) Vuelta a España Points classification (2008) 1 individual stage (2008) Stage races Tirreno–Adriatico (2016) Tour of Belgium (2015) Tour de Wallonie (2011, 2013) Tour de Luxembourg (2017) Tour de Yorkshire (2018) One-day races and Classics Olympic Games Road Race (2016) Paris–Roubaix (2017) Gent–Wevelgem (2017) E3 Harelbeke (2017) GP de Montréal (2016, 2019) Omloop Het Nieuwsblad (2016, 2017) Paris–Tours (2011) Other UCI World Tour (2017) UCI World Ranking (2017)
Medal record
Representing Belgium
Men's road bicycle racing
Olympic Games
Gold medal – first place	2016 Rio de Janeiro	Men's road race

Greg Van Avermaet (born 17 May 1985) is a retired Belgian professional cyclist. Considered one of the most versatile riders of modern cycling, Van Avermaet was a specialist of the classic cycle races, but has also won stages and the general classification in stage races, particularly when run on a hilly terrain, such as the 2016 Tirreno–Adriatico, and the 2018 Tour de Yorkshire. His strong sprint finish enabled him to win sprints of small lead groups, but he has also won races after solo breakaways.

He won the men's individual road race event at the 2016 Summer Olympics, and has won other one-day races such as Paris–Roubaix, Gent–Wevelgem and E3 Harelbeke in 2017, the 2016 GP de Montréal and Omloop Het Nieuwsblad in 2016 and 2017. In the Grand Tours, Van Avermaet has taken two individual stage wins in the Tour de France, and worn the Yellow Jersey for eleven days during the 2016 and 2018 Tours and won the points classification in the Vuelta a España, with one stage win in the Vuelta a España. Van Avermaet was also the overall winner of the 2017 UCI World Tour.

For the 2021 season, Van Avermaet joined the AG2R Citroën Team on a three-year contract. He retired from racing in 2023, and his last race was the Paris-Tours.

== Career ==
=== Early life and amateur career ===
Greg Van Avermaet was born into a cycling family; both his father and grandfather were professional cyclists. He was named after American cyclist Greg LeMond since his father "was a fan". He started bike racing at the age of 19, having previously played football as a goalkeeper for SK Beveren. He is a former brother-in-law of Glenn D'Hollander, also a former professional cyclist. In 2006, at 21, he became Belgian amateur champion on the Bodysol–Win for Life–Jong Vlaanderen team.

=== 2007–2010: Silence/Omega Pharma–Lotto ===
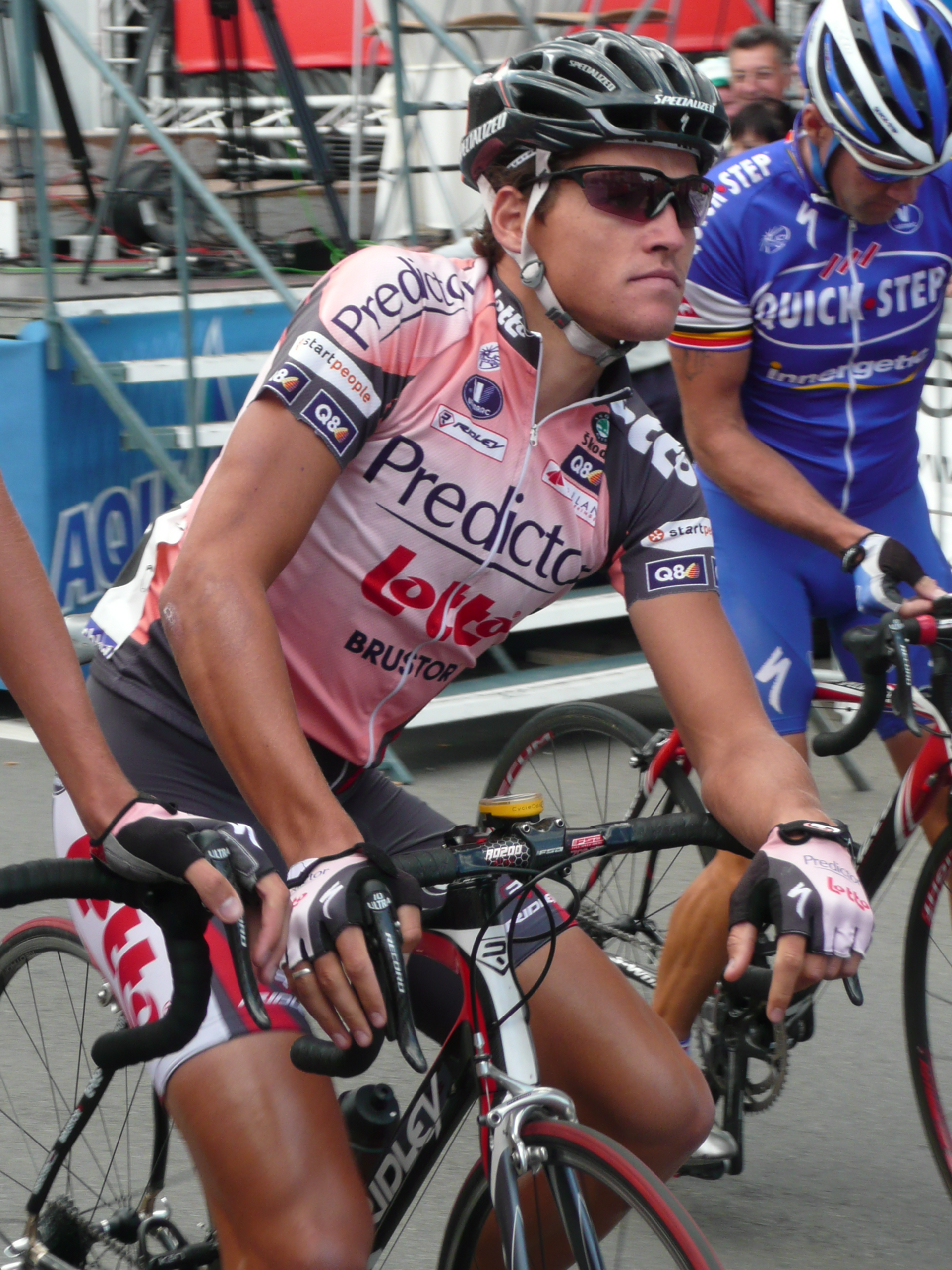
Van Avermaet (pictured in 2007) raced four years for the Predictor–Lotto team.

2007

In 2007 he signed his first professional contract for the Predictor–Lotto UCI ProTeam and won four races in his maiden year. In the Tour of Qatar, his first professional race for his new team, he won stage 5 in the sprint of a breakaway group, followed by a number of good finishes in smaller races. His results earned him a place in the line-up for the Tour of Flanders and Paris–Roubaix – his best result being 29th in Roubaix. A few months later he won a stage in the Tour de Wallonie, as well as the prestigious one-day race Rund um die Hainleite in Germany and the Memorial Rik Van Steenbergen in Belgium. He entered his first world championships, in Stuttgart, finishing 63rd in the road race.

2008

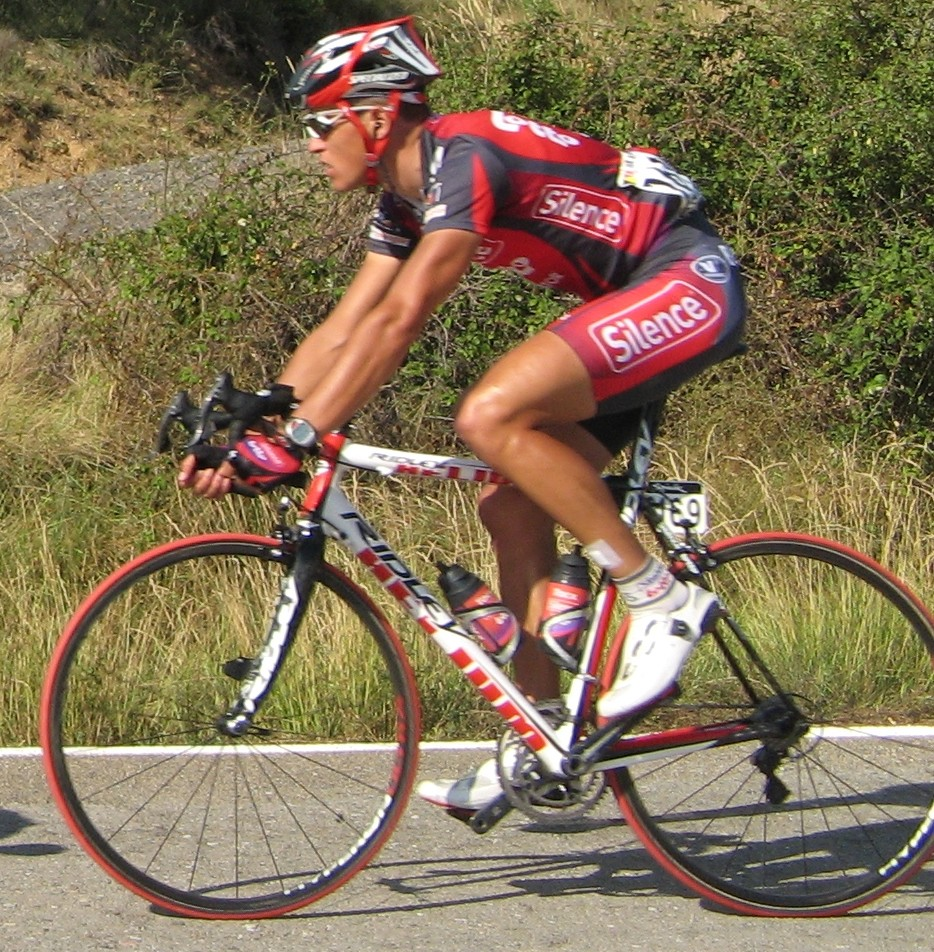
Van Avermaet at the 2008 Vuelta a Espana

Van Avermaet's breakthrough year was 2008. He finished third in E3 Harelbeke after being in a breakaway, and eighth in his second Tour of Flanders. In May, he won the Ardennes stage in the Tour of Belgium, but lost the leader's jersey the next day to Stijn Devolder and finished second overall. Later, he was fourth in the Belgian National Road Race Championships.

In summer he won stages in the Tour de Wallonie and the Tour de l'Ain, as well as seventh place in the GP Ouest-France in Plouay, before making his debut in a grand tour, the Vuelta a España. He made a remarkable debut, with a victory on stage 9 of the race, when he outsprinted ten other breakaway companions in Sabiñánigo, ahead of Davide Rebellin. Following several other top-10 finishes, he also won the Vuelta's final points classification ahead of Alberto Contador and Alejandro Valverde. One week later, he finished 17th in the World Road Race Championships in Varese. At the end of 2008, he was awarded the Flandrien of the Year award by Belgian journalists.

2009

2009 proved to be a difficult year, with one win, the Heistse Pijl, and several near-wins. He made his first appearance in the Tour de France, with fourth and seventh places in the latter stages as best results. He finished the Tour de France in 89th place overall.

2010

In 2010 he could not claim a win and did not make the line-up for the Tour de France. He placed 49th in his second Vuelta a España, before competing in the World Championships in Australia. He finished fifth in the road race in Geelong, in a sprint won by Thor Hushovd. At the end of the season he stated he would leave his Omega Pharma–Lotto team.

=== 2011: Transfer to BMC and Paris–Tours victory ===
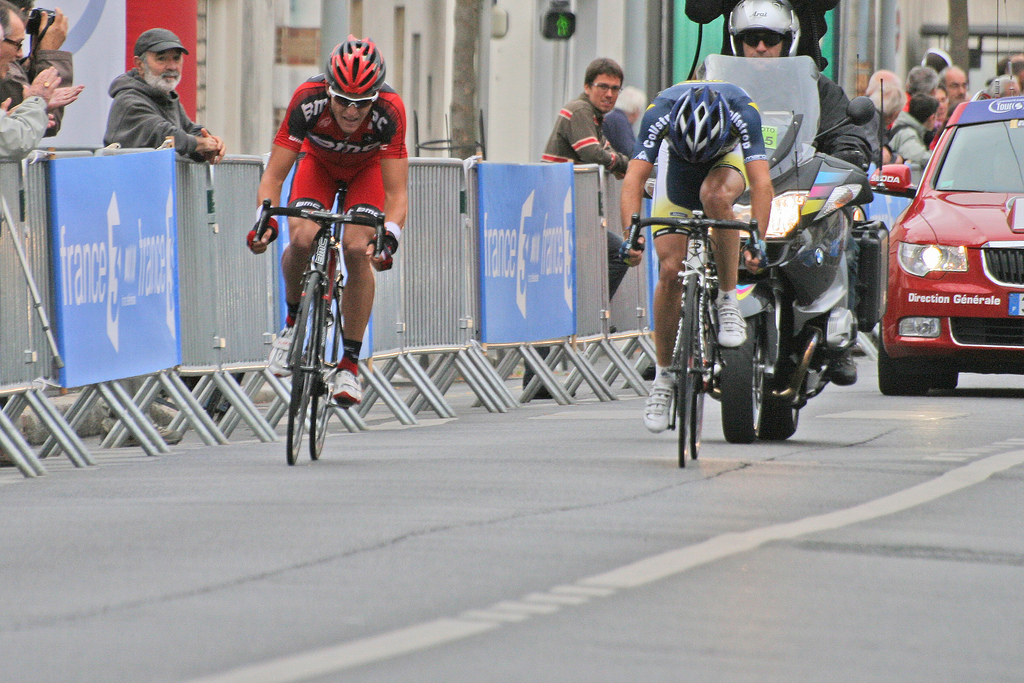
Van Avermaet took his first classic victory at the 2011 Paris–Tours, after a two-man sprint with Italian Marco Marcato.

In 2011 he joined BMC Racing Team. After starting his season in the Tour of Qatar, he ran a remarkable campaign in the spring classics, in which he was one of the most attacking riders. Ninth place in Milan–San Remo and seventh in Liège–Bastogne–Liège were his best results. After the spring classics, he finished second in the Tour of Belgium.

In summer, he claimed his first victories for his new team. He won a stage and the points classification in the Tour of Austria, and he won the overall classification and final stage in the Tour de Wallonie. He entered the Eneco Tour and Vuelta a España in which he gained several top-20 stage results. In October he claimed his first classic victory, after beating Marco Marcato in a two-man sprint in Paris–Tours. He finished the season with a second place in the Giro del Piemonte and twelfth in the Tour of Lombardy.

=== 2012–2014: Mister Almost ===
2012

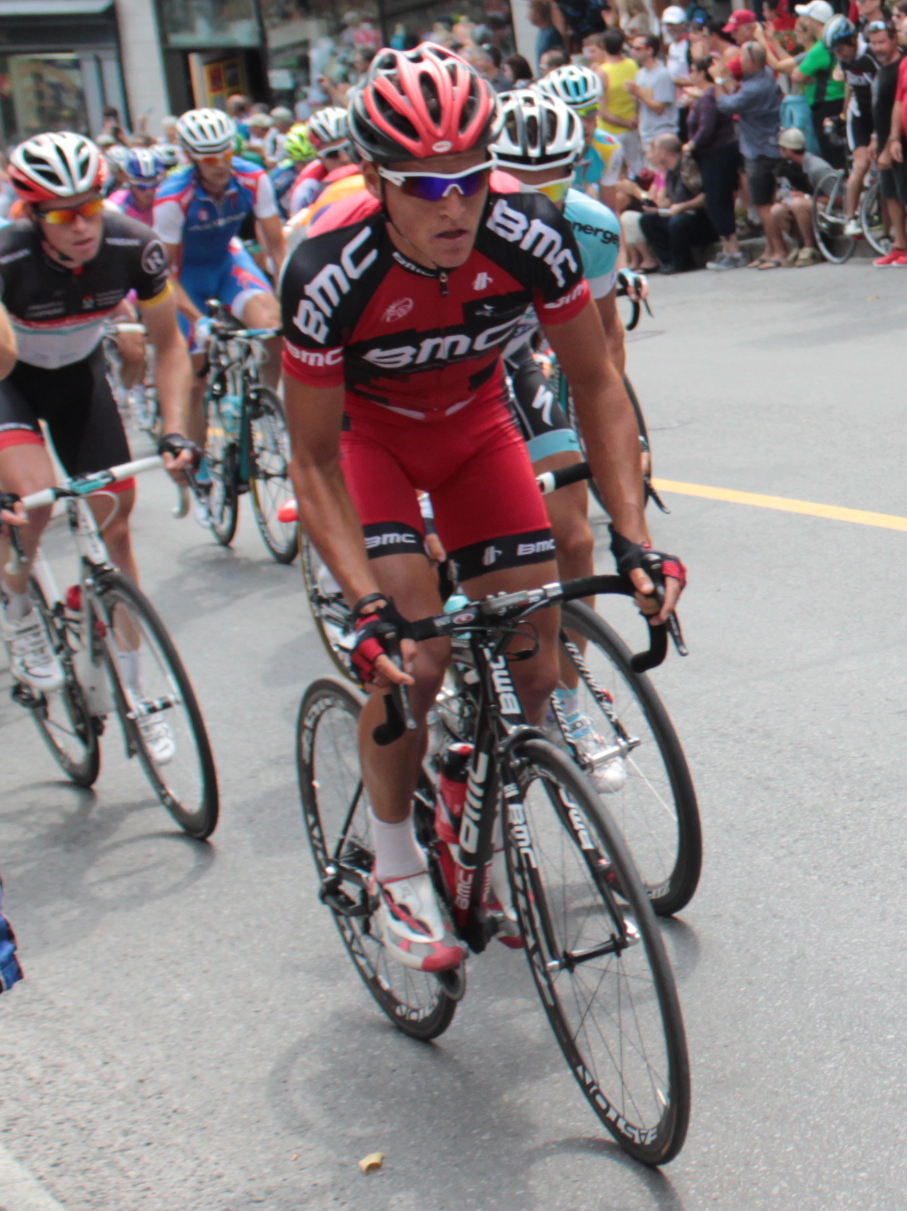
Van Avermaet at the 2012 Grand Prix Cycliste de Québec

In the spring of 2012 Van Avermaet became a front-runner in the classics with several strong performances. Early in the season he was fifth in both Omloop Het Nieuwsblad and Strade Bianche, before focusing on the cobbled classics. He finished fourth in the Tour of Flanders, where he won the sprint at the finish in Oudenaarde 40 seconds behind the leading breakaway.

In summer, he skipped the Tour de France again and came close to winning his first World Tour race in the Grand Prix de Québec. He attacked on the final Côte de la Montagne, but was joined by Simon Gerrans, who beat him in a two-man sprint. He was second again five days later in the Grand Prix de Wallonie, before competing in the World Road Race Championships in Valkenburg, in the Netherlands. He placed 25th in the race, after playing a helping role for his teammate Philippe Gilbert, who won the world title. He ended his season with eighth place in the Giro del Piemonte and sixth in Paris–Tours.

2013

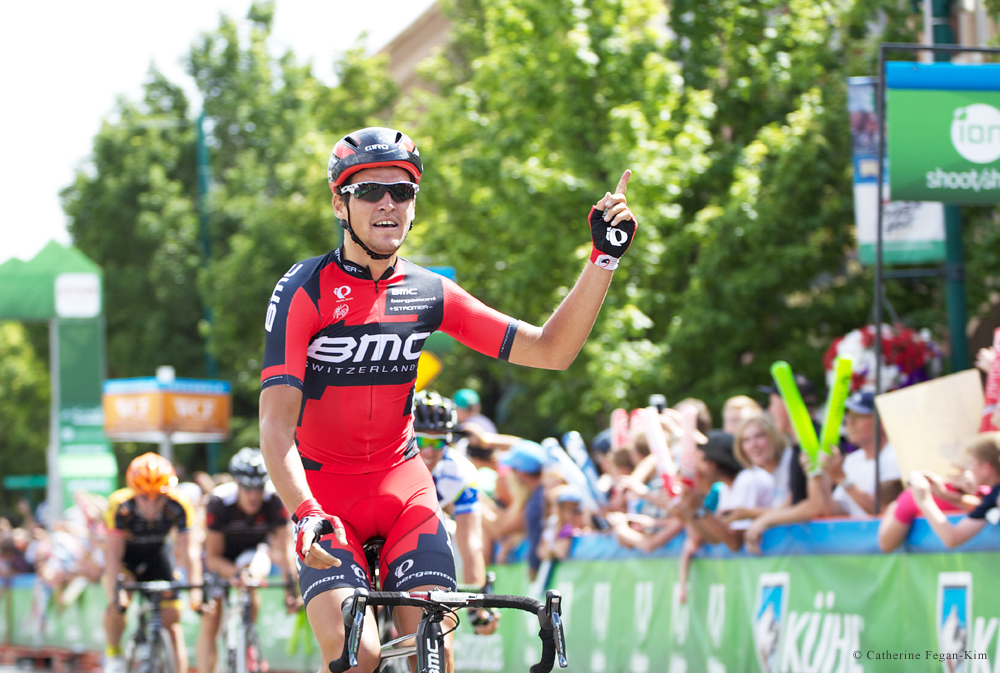
Van Avermaet celebrating victory on Stage 1 of the 2013 Tour of Utah

In 2013, Van Avermaet garnered several top-10 finishes in the spring classics. He finished fifth in Omloop Het Nieuwsblad, sixth in Strade Bianche, third in Gent–Wevelgem, seventh in the Tour of Flanders, fourth in Paris–Roubaix and sixth in Brabantse Pijl, but again failed to claim a single win.

Later in the year, he had a strong summer campaign, starting with two stage wins and the overall classification in the Tour de Wallonie, as well the first stage of the Tour of Utah and several top-5 stage finishes in the USA Pro Cycling Challenge. In the GP Ouest-France he was caught by the peloton at 300 metres (980 feet) from the finish after a late attack. In the Laurentian Classics in Canada, he finished third in the Grand Prix de Québec and fourth in the Grand Prix de Montréal. Back in Europe, he finished 23rd in the World Road Race Championships in Florence and 19th in the Giro di Lombardia. At the end of 2013, with four victories, he won his second Flandrien of the Year award.

2014

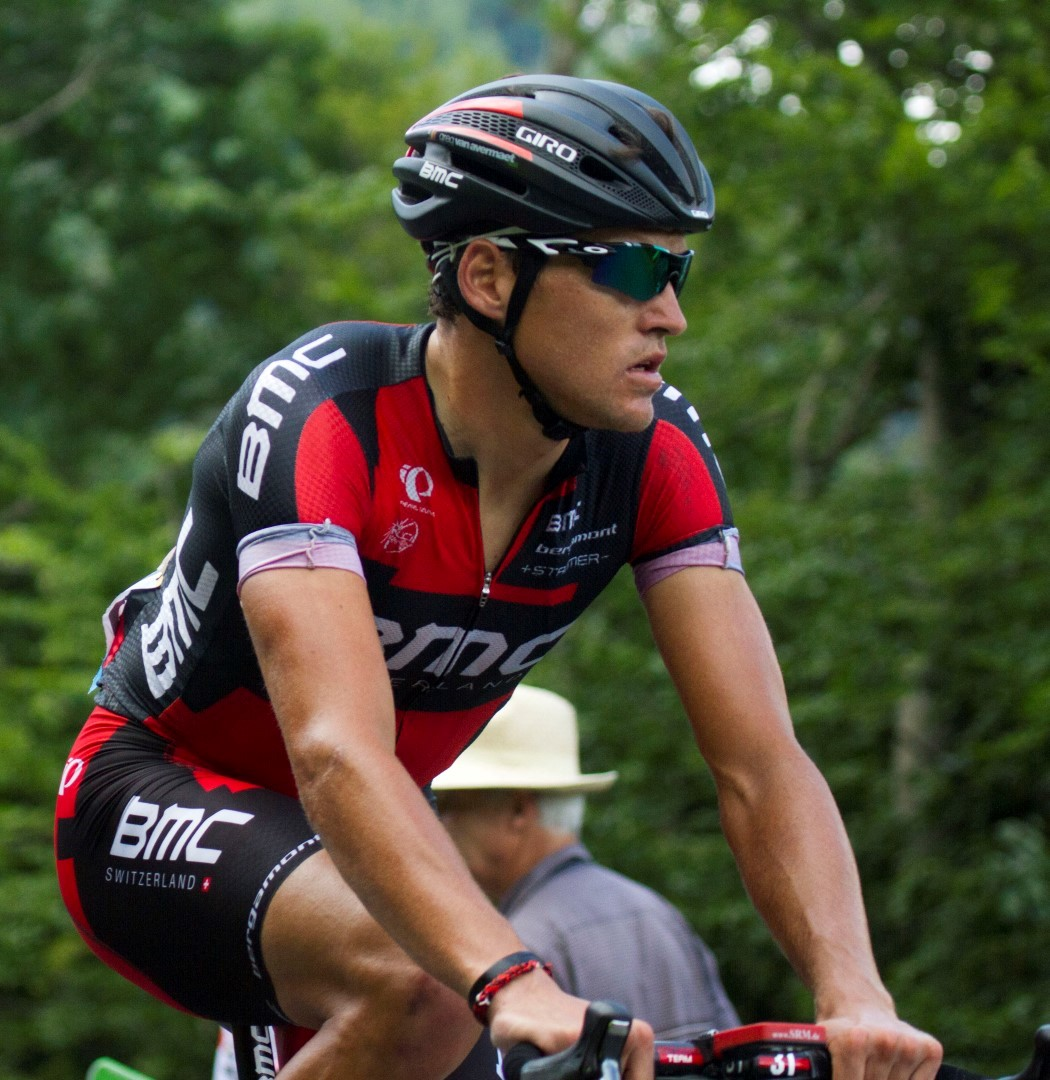
Van Avermaet at the 2014 Tour de France

In 2014, Van Avermaet ran another strong spring campaign but again failed to win a classic race. He finished second in Omloop Het Nieuwsblad and the Tour of Flanders, losing both races in the sprint, to Ian Stannard and Fabian Cancellara respectively. In the summer, he entered the Tour de France, in which he helped his leader Tejay van Garderen to fifth place in the general classification and finished 38th himself.

Later in the campaign, Van Avermaet took eighth place in the Clásica San Sebastián and fifth overall in the Eneco Tour, as well as one stage win. He finished fifth in the GP de Quebec – his third consecutive top-5 finish in Quebec – and seventh in the GP de Montréal. In September, Van Avermaet won the 1.HC-ranked Grand Prix de Wallonie; he was part of a four-strong breakaway and, with the peloton on their heels, Van Avermaet attacked in the final uphill bends to claim his second win of the season. Three days later, he won the GP Impanis-Van Petegem, earning him the leadership in the Belgian line-up for the World championships in Ponferrada, Spain. He was in the winning breakaway of the road race together with his BMC Racing Team teammate and fellow Belgian Philippe Gilbert, but was unable to answer an ultimate attack from Michał Kwiatkowski and finished fifth. He ended the season with 39th place in Paris–Tours.

At the end of 2014 he earned his third Flandrien of the year award as best Belgian rider of the year.

=== 2015: Classics specialist and Tour de France stage win ===
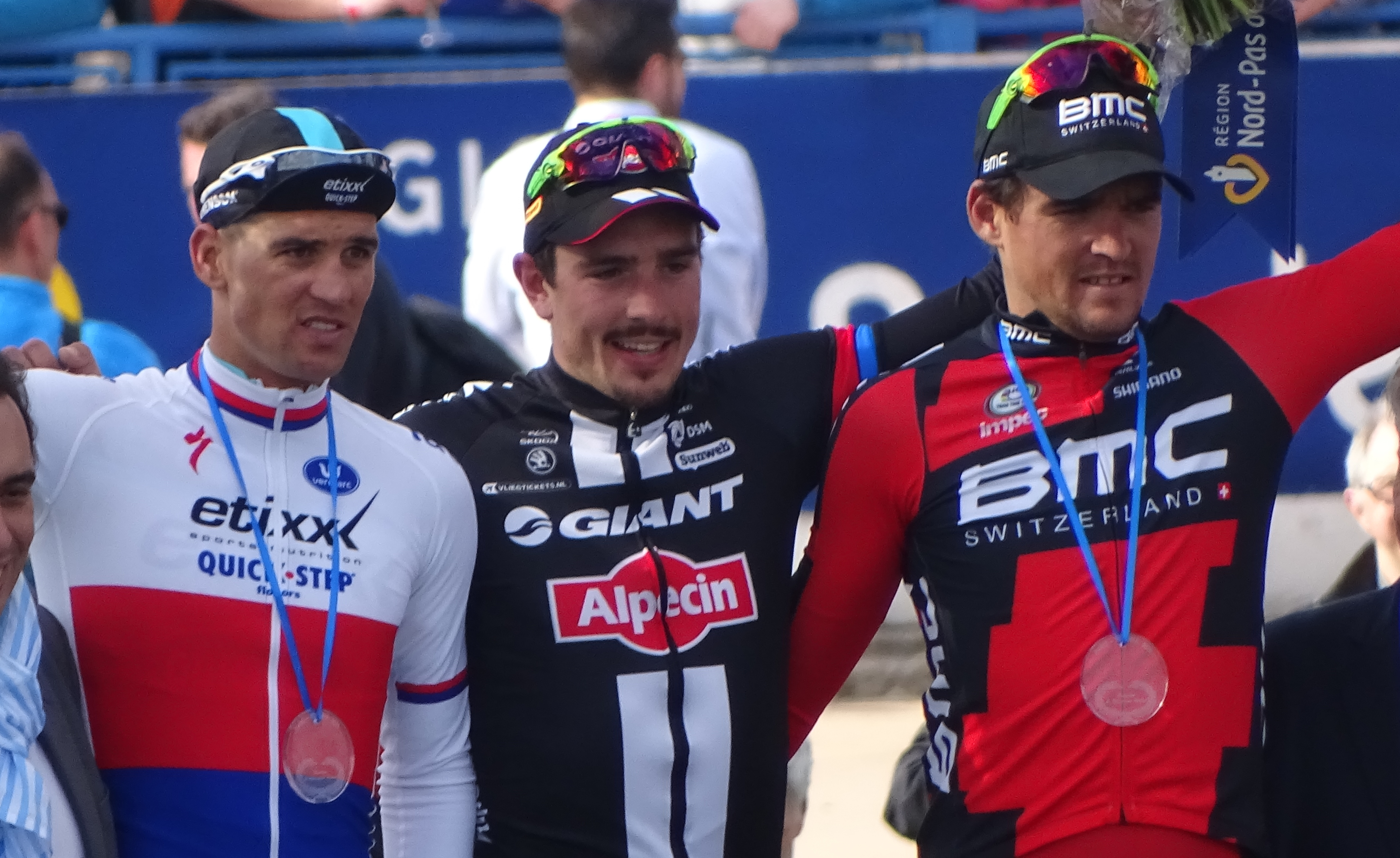
In the spring of 2015 Van Avermaet was third in both the Tour of Flanders and Paris–Roubaix. (pictured on the podium of Paris–Roubaix with John Degenkolb and Zdeněk Štybar)

In 2015, Van Avermaet started his season traditionally in the Middle-Eastern Tour of Qatar and Tour of Oman races, where he placed third on two stages. After another top-ten finish in Omloop Het Nieuwsblad, he finished second in Strade Bianche behind Zdeněk Štybar. He claimed his first victory of the season on Stage 3 of Tirreno–Adriatico in an uphill-sprint finish, besting Peter Sagan and Štybar. Coming into the cobbled classics, he crashed hard in E3 Harelbeke, nearly jeopardizing the April classics. In April, Van Avermaet finished third in the Tour of Flanders after a strong performance. He dropped Sagan in the final kilometers of the race while closing in on Alexander Kristoff, the eventual winner, and Niki Terpstra. A week later, he earned another prestigious podium finish in Paris–Roubaix, finishing third in a seven-man sprint behind John Degenkolb and Štybar. He ended his classics campaign with fifth place in the Amstel Gold Race, despite being under investigation for doping, at that time.

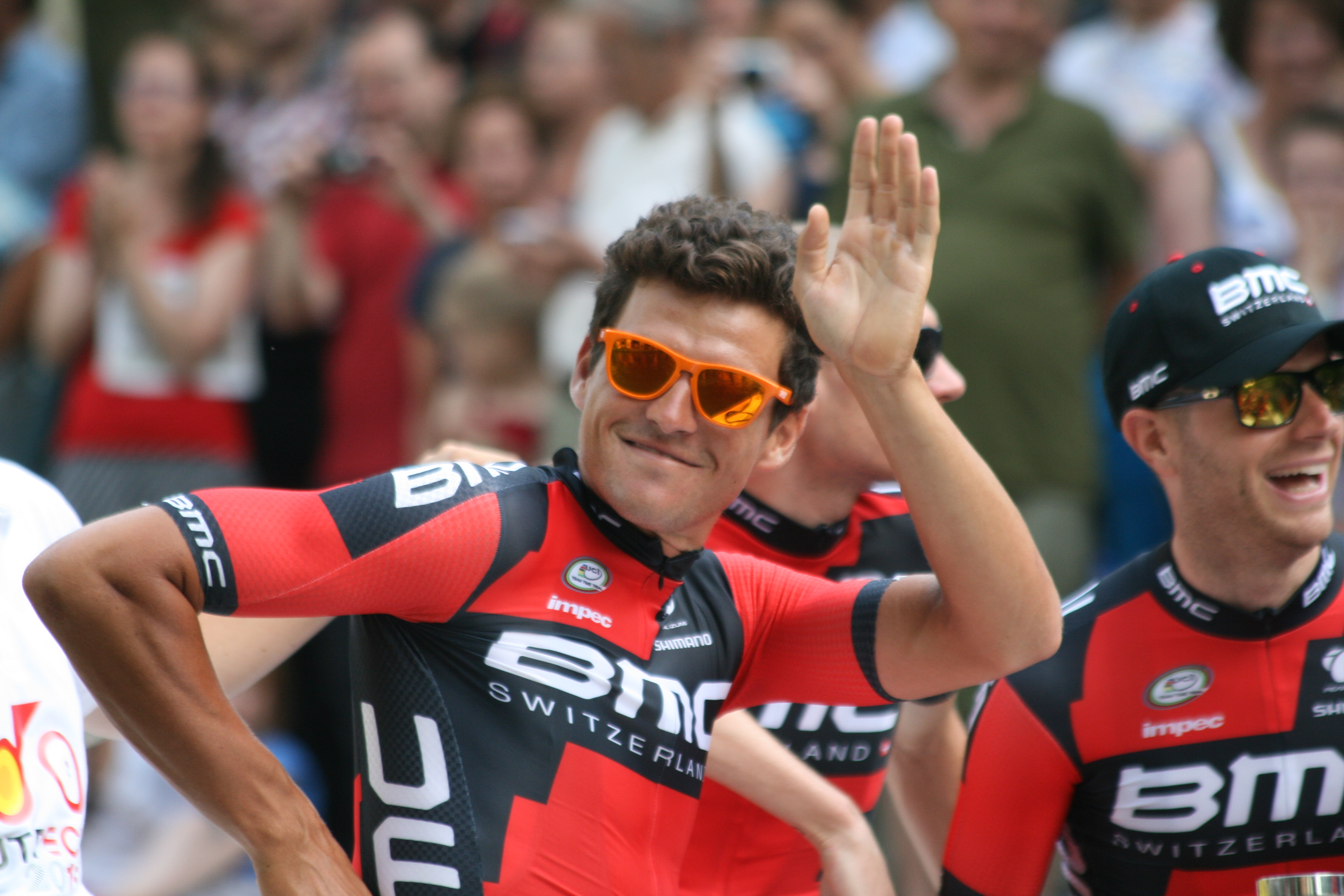
Van Avermaet at the team presentation in Utrecht for the 2015 Tour de France, in which he won stage 13 – an uphill sprint in Rodez.

In May, in his build-up to the Tour de France, Van Avermaet won both the final stage and the overall classification in the Tour of Belgium. He took part in the Tour de Suisse, finishing sixth on the Prologue and third in stage 4. He entered the Tour de France, in which he helped the BMC Racing Team win the team time trial on Stage 9. On 17 July 2015, he won stage 13, his first individual Tour de France stage win. He outsprinted the green jersey wearer Peter Sagan, and fellow Belgian Jan Bakelants on an uphill finish in Rodez. He withdrew from the race three days later to witness the birth of his first daughter.

Less than two weeks later, on 1 August 2015, Van Avermaet looked on his way to victory in the Clásica de San Sebastián, when he was hit from behind by one of the motorbikes providing television coverage just before the top of the final climb. Suffering a broken bike frame, he was unable to finish and saw Adam Yates win the race. In the aftermath of the incident, his BMC Racing Team claimed the crash had cost him victory and threatened legal action over "millions of dollars in lost publicity". A few days later he entered the Eneco Tour and finished second overall, trailing winner Tim Wellens by a minute.

In his preparation for the world championships he placed fifth in the Vattenfall Cyclassics in Hamburg and entered the Laurentian Classics in Canada. Considered a favourite in the world road race title in Richmond, he attacked on Libby Hill, the final climb of the race, but was overtaken by Peter Sagan and narrowly failed to stay in his wheel. His attempts to catch Sagan failed as his chase companion Edvald Boasson Hagen was not allowed to work in the pursuit and both were caught by the returning peloton in the final kilometer. Van Avermaet finished 23rd. His last race of the season was Paris–Tours, where he was in the winning three-man breakaway and the favourite to win the sprint, when he punctured just one kilometer from the line and finished third. At the end of the year, Van Avermaet was awarded both the Crystal Bicycle and Flandrien of the Year awards as best Belgian cyclist of the year, and was second in the Belgian Sportsman of the year poll behind footballer Kevin De Bruyne.

=== 2016: Olympic champion ===
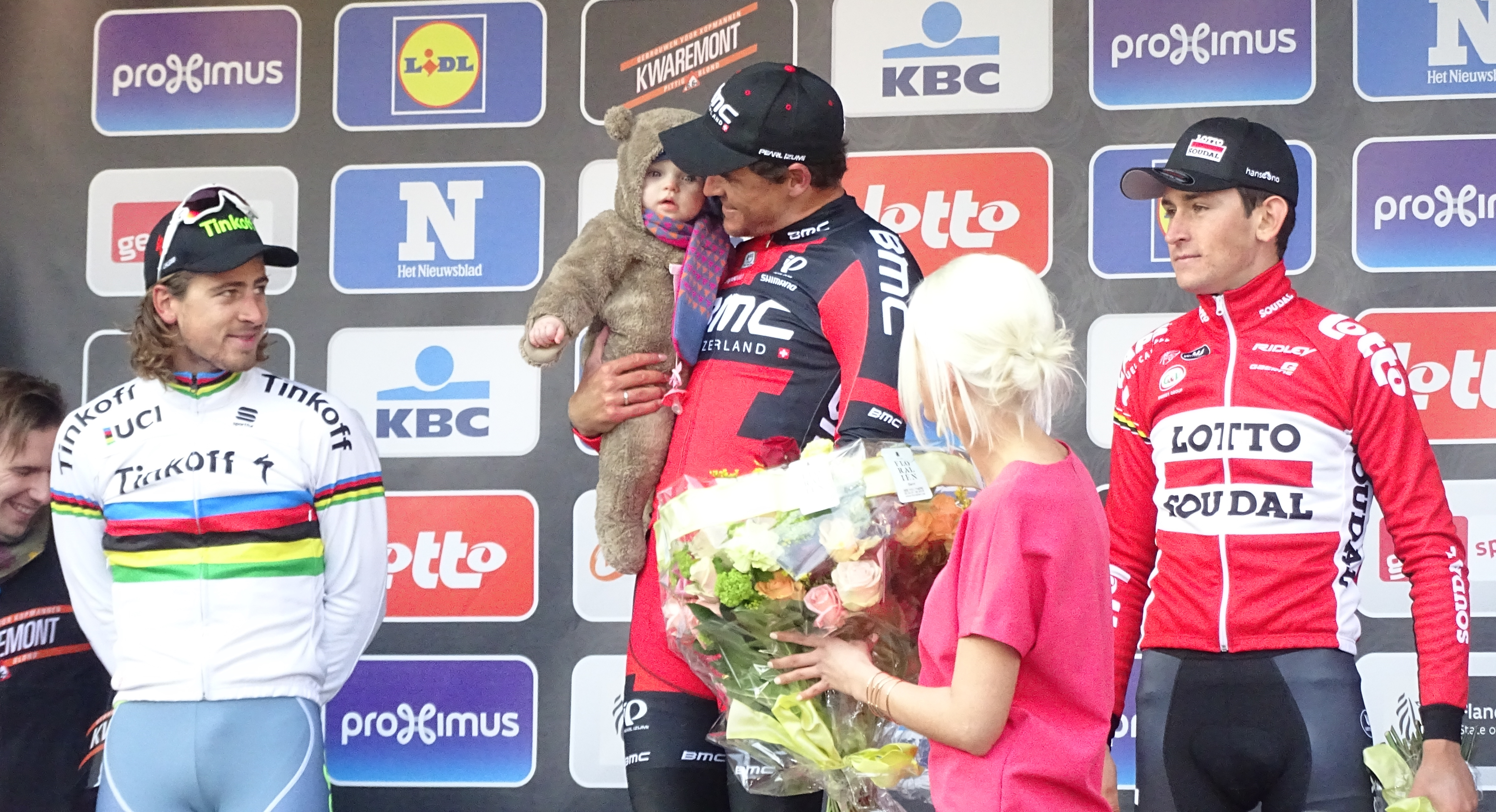
Van Avermaet on the podium of 2016 Omloop Het Nieuwsblad with his daughter Fleur, Peter Sagan (left) and Tiesj Benoot (right).

In 2016 he opened the season with numerous top-5 placings in the Tour of Qatar and Tour of Oman. In late February, he won Omloop Het Nieuwsblad, after beating Peter Sagan in a five-man sprint in Ghent. He finished sixth in Strade Bianche, before entering Tirreno–Adriatico, where he was on the winning team of the opening team time trial. After the cancellation of Tirreno's queen stage, he won the sixth stage in a sprint with Sagan, and successfully defended his lead in the final time trial, by one second over Sagan – his first overall win in a World Tour stage race. The victory pushed Van Avermaet to the top of the UCI World Ranking for one week. Following Tirreno–Adriatico, he finished fifth in Milan–San Remo but crashed and broke his collarbone in the Tour of Flanders.

After his return from injury in May, he competed in the Tour of California and the Critérium du Dauphiné, before placing third in the Belgian National Road Race Championships behind Philippe Gilbert and Tim Wellens. In July he entered the Tour de France: he won stage 5 to Le Lioran, his second Tour de France stage win, after a long breakaway and having completed the final 17 kilometres (11 miles) solo. He also moved into the yellow jersey, which he held for three days, and finished 44th overall. Six days after the Tour de France, he finished fifth in the Clásica de San Sebastián in Spain.

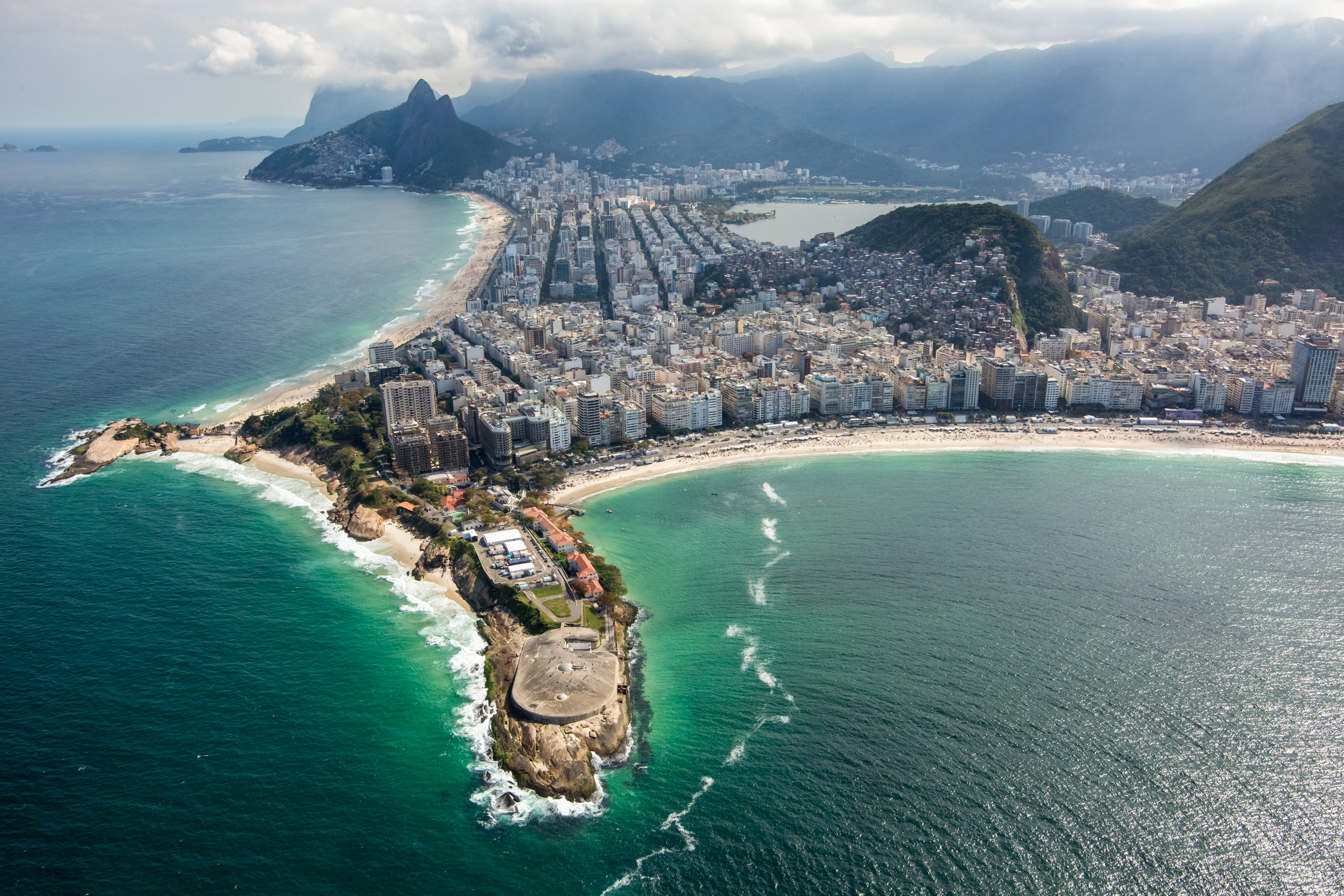
Van Avermaet won the Olympic road race, finishing near Fort Copacabana, at the Rio Olympics.

On 6 August 2016, Van Avermaet won the men's individual road race at the Summer Olympics in Rio de Janeiro. He initially joined a six-man breakaway on the first of three passes of the 25.7-kilometre (16.0 mi) Vista Chinesa Circuit loop, and managed to stay in contact with several climbing specialists on the next ascents. Van Avermaet was distanced by Vincenzo Nibali, Sergio Henao and Rafał Majka on the final climb, but after Nibali and Henao crashed out of the race on the final descent, Van Avermaet tandemed with Jakob Fuglsang to catch Majka on the run-in to the finish. Van Avermaet won the three-man sprint on Copacabana Beach before Fuglsang and Majka to claim the Olympic gold medal.

Later in the season he finished second in the Grand Prix de Québec behind Peter Sagan; he won the Grand Prix de Montréal ahead of Sagan; ended fourth overall in the Eneco Tour; as well as fourth in Binche–Chimay–Binche. He ended the season with a 10th place at the World Road Race Championships in Qatar.

=== 2017: King of the spring classics and world number one ===
After suffering an ankle fracture during the winter, Van Avermaet started his 2017 campaign in February at the Tour of the Valencian Community, in which his BMC Racing Team won the opening team time trial. Later in February he rode the Tour of Oman, before competing in the opening weekend of Belgian races. He won his second consecutive Omloop Het Nieuwsblad, again after beating Peter Sagan in a three-man sprint in Ghent; and finished seventh in Kuurne–Brussels–Kuurne the next day.

As usual, he proceeded his spring campaign in the Italian races Strade Bianche, in which he finished second behind Michał Kwiatkowski; Tirreno–Adriatico, in which his BMC Racing Team won the team time trial and he moved into the race lead for one day; and was 21st in Milan–San Remo. On 24 March, Van Avermaet won E3 Harelbeke in a three-man sprint with Philippe Gilbert and Oliver Naesen. Two days later, he continued his winning streak with victory in Gent–Wevelgem in a two-man sprint against Jens Keukeleire. The pairing had broken away from a select group of riders on the run-in towards Wevelgem. Van Avermaet became the second rider to win Omloop Het Nieuwsblad, E3 Harelbeke and Gent–Wevelgem in the same season, after Jan Raas in 1981, and moved into the lead of the UCI World Tour.

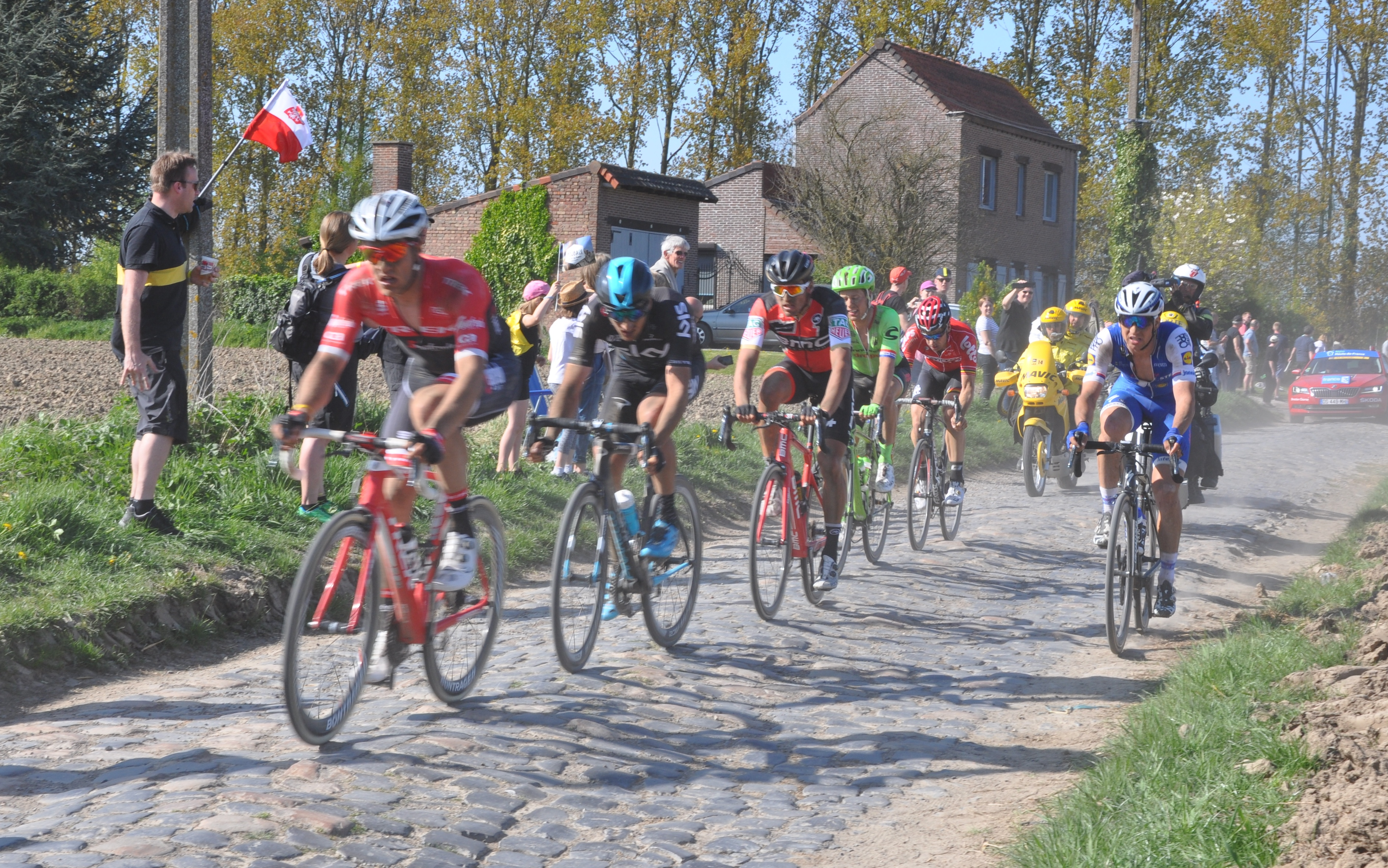
Van Avermaet claimed his first career monument win at the 2017 Paris–Roubaix. (Pictured in third position in the lead group at 26 kilometres (16 miles) from the finish)

Still seeking his first win in a monument classic, he was favourite for the Tour of Flanders, but crashed on the final ascent of Oude Kwaremont together with Peter Sagan as they were chasing Philippe Gilbert. Halted in his pursuit, he finished second behind his former teammate Gilbert. On 9 April 2017, Van Avermaet won Paris–Roubaix, claiming his first career monument victory. After suffering a mechanical failure at 100 kilometres (62 miles) from the finish and a 22-kilometre (14 mi) chase to return to the peloton, he made the decisive move with 30 kilometres (19 miles) to go. He broke away with five others on the cobbled sector of Templeuve-en-Pévèle in pursuit of his teammate Daniel Oss. After the sector of Carrefour de l'Arbre, only Zdeněk Štybar and Sebastian Langeveld were with him, and Van Avermaet outsprinted his companions for the win on the Roubaix Velodrome. Van Avermaet's average speed of 45.204 kilometres per hour (28.088 mph) was the fastest in Paris–Roubaix history, breaking the previous record set by Peter Post in 1964. (Note: Peter Post's 1964 record was set during an era when the race parcours had far fewer cobbled sectors.) The race was also the first monument win for the BMC Racing Team. He ended his spring campaign with a 12th place in the Amstel Gold Race and 11th in Liège–Bastogne–Liège.

Building up towards the Tour de France, he won two stages and the general classification at the Tour of Luxembourg, followed by 48th place overall at the Tour de Suisse. He failed to win a stage at the Tour de France, with a second-place finish on stage 14 to Rodez as best stage result. After the Tour de France, he was eighth in the Clásica San Sebastián, fourth overall in the Binckbank Tour and tenth in the Bretagne Classic. In September, he finished second at the Grand Prix de Québec, seventh at the Grand Prix de Montréal and was sixth in the World Road Race Championships in Bergen, Norway. He ended the year as world number one on both the UCI World Ranking and UCI World Tour, a place he held since April 2017.

=== 2018: One week in the yellow jersey ===
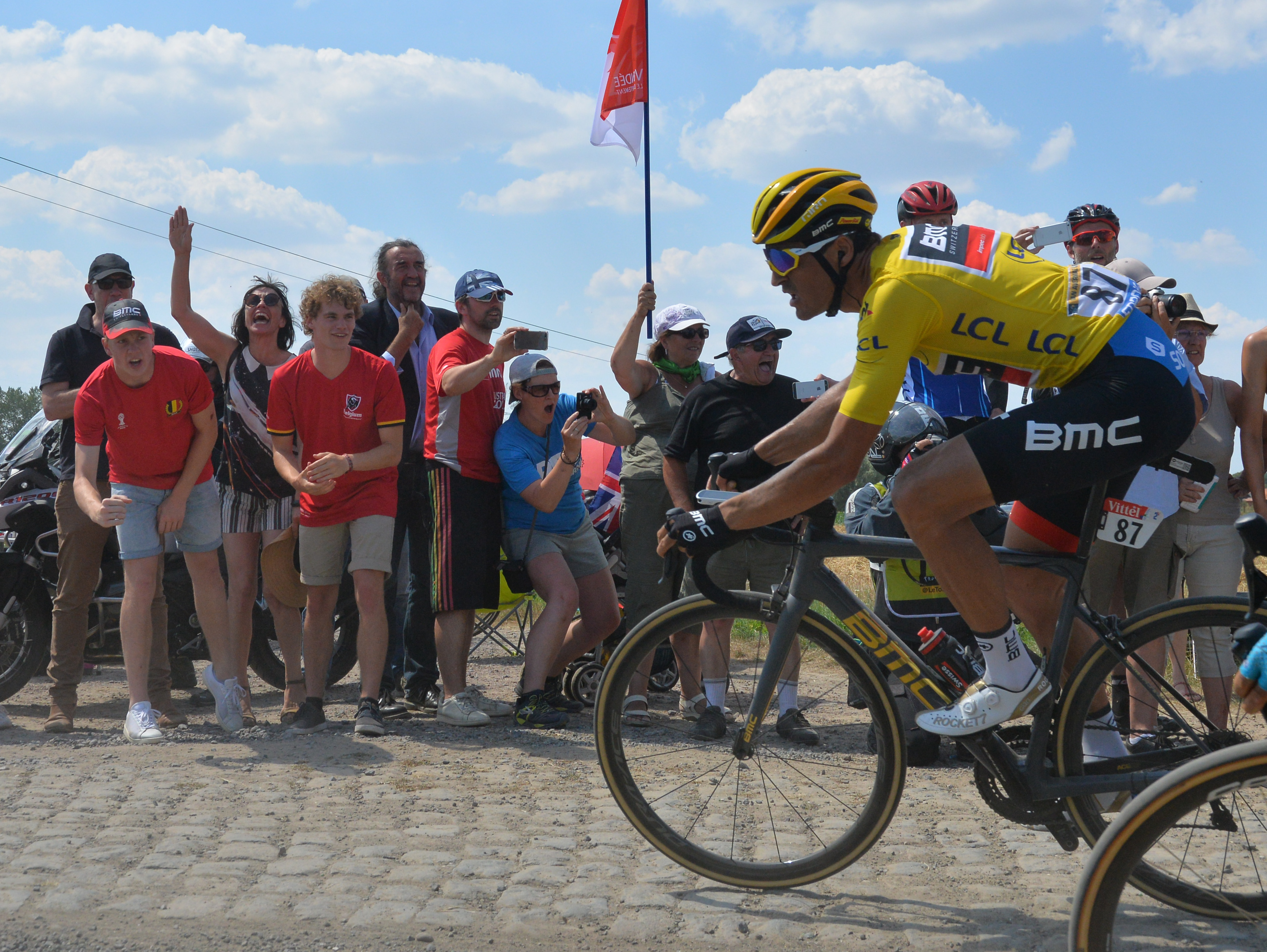
Van Avermaet wore the yellow jersey for eight days at the 2018 Tour de France. (pictured in the breakaway during stage 9 to Roubaix)

As world number one, Van Avermaet kicked off the 2018 season with 20th place overall in the Tour of Valencia and 16th overall in the Tour of Oman, in which he won the third stage in a group sprint on the Wadi Dayqah Dam. He proceeded with 50th place in Omloop Het Nieuwsblad, 34th in Strade Bianche, 20th overall in Tirreno–Adriatico, and 17th in Milan–San Remo. In the cobbled classics of Belgium and France, Van Avermaet was at the front in every race but failed to secure a win, finishing third in E3 Harelbeke, 14th in Gent–Wevelgem, and eighth in Dwars door Vlaanderen. In the Tour of Flanders he accelerated on the Taaienberg, at 38 km from the finish, but was unable to break clear and finished fifth. One week later he was fourth at Paris–Roubaix, after his move on the cobbled sector of Auchy-lez-Orchies was counter-attacked by the eventual winner Peter Sagan at 54 km from Roubaix.

In May, he won the Tour of Yorkshire after an attack in the final stage to Leeds. He won the opening team time trial with his BMC team of the Tour de Suisse in June, before entering the Tour de France. Van Avermaet moved into the yellow jersey on the third day of the Tour after BMC won the team time trial in Cholet. He finished second, in the yellow jersey, in stage 9 to Roubaix, which included 21.7 km (13.5 mi) of cobbled sectors. Van Avermaet was beaten by John Degenkolb in a three-man sprint after they broke clear at 17 km (11 mi) from the finish. He managed to keep the maillot jaune for another day, after he went in the breakaway and finished fourth in the first mountain stage to Le Grand Bornand. He wore the yellow jersey for eight days and finished 28th in the general classification.

In August, Van Avermaet finished fourth in the Clásica de San Sebastián, 25th in the European road race championship in Glasgow and was sixth overall in the BinckBank Tour. Later in the season, he secured a second-place finish at the Grand Prix de Québec and third in the Grand Prix de Montréal, both times behind winner Michael Matthews. He ended the season at the World Road Race Championships in Innsbruck, Austria. He claimed the bronze medal with his BMC team at the team time trial event and finished 50th in the men's road race.

=== 2019: CCC Pro Team ===
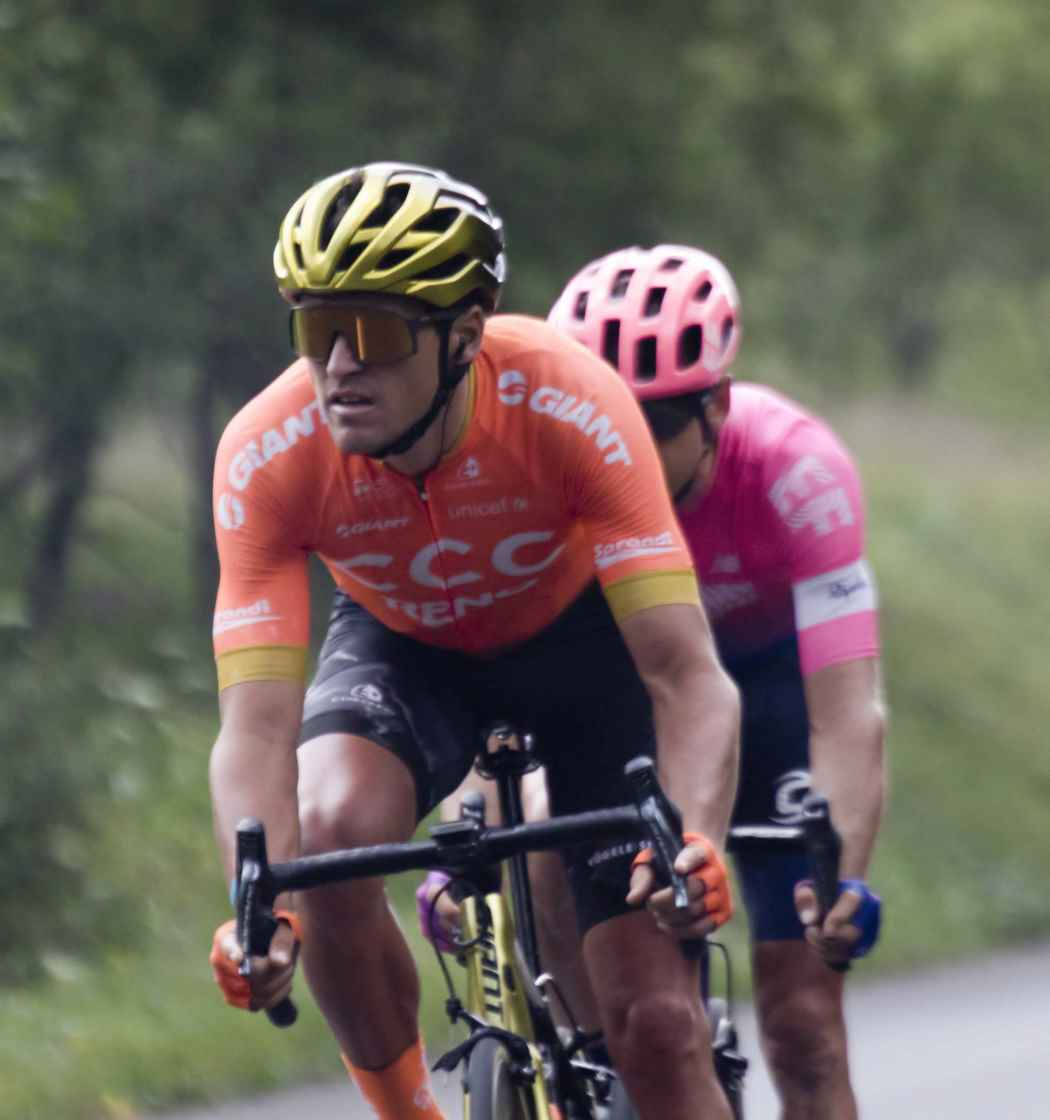
Van Avermaet at the 2019 Tour de France

In 2019, BMC changed sponsorship following the death of team owner Andy Rihs. Poland-based shoe retailer CCC became the new title sponsor, leaving Van Avermaet as the prime anchor of the team. He started the season with a stage win and 21st place overall in the Tour of Valencia and 17th overall in the Tour of Oman, but failed to secure another win in his classics campaign. He finished second at Omloop Het Nieuwsblad behind Zdeněk Štybar, sixth in Strade Bianche, third in E3 Harelbeke and a disappointing tenth in the Tour of Flanders. On 15 September 2019 Van Avermaet won the Grand Prix Cycliste de Montréal for the second time in his career.

== Doping allegations ==
In April 2015 the Royal Belgian Cycling League requested a two-year ban for Van Avermaet, the disqualification of all his results during the 2012 season and a €262,500 fine following an investigation into suspected anti-doping offences. It was reported in the Belgian media that their accusations focused on allegations of Van Avermaet's use of the corticoid Diprophos, and Vaminolact, a fortified baby food which is banned from being injected. On 7 May 2015, it was announced that Van Avermaet was cleared of all allegations.

== Major results ==
2005
8th Road race, UEC European Under-23 Road Championships
8th Ronde van Vlaanderen U23
9th Flèche Ardennaise
2006
1st Road race, National Under-23 Road Championships
1st Internationale Wielertrofee Jong Maar Moedig
1st Kattekoers
1st GP Berlare
2nd Paris–Tours Espoirs
4th Grand Prix de Waregem
8th Overall Le Triptyque des Monts et Châteaux
8th Overall Giro delle Regioni
9th Circuit de Wallonie
9th Druivenkoers Overijse
2007 (4 pro wins)
1st Rund um die Hainleite
1st Memorial Rik Van Steenbergen
1st Stage 5 Tour of Qatar
1st Stage 2 Tour de Wallonie
3rd Ronde van het Groene Hart
3rd GP Briek Schotte
4th Grand Prix d'Isbergues
4th Nokere Koerse
5th Grand Prix of Aargau Canton
5th Grote Prijs Gerrie Knetemann
6th Overall Tour de Picardie
6th Halle–Ingooigem
8th Vattenfall Cyclassics
9th Overall Tour of Belgium
2008 (4)
Vuelta a España

1st Points classification
1st Stage 9

Tour de l'Ain

1st Points classification
1st Stage 2

2nd Overall Tour of Belgium

1st Stage 3

2nd Overall Tour de Wallonie

1st Stage 3

3rd Overall Tour of Qatar

1st Young rider classification

3rd E3 Prijs Vlaanderen
4th Road race, National Road Championships
7th Overall Tour de Picardie
7th GP Ouest–France
7th Grote Prijs Stad Zottegem
8th Tour of Flanders
2009
1st Heistse Pijl
4th Road race, National Road Championships
4th Omloop Het Nieuwsblad
4th Halle–Ingooigem
5th Overall Tour of Belgium
5th Grand Prix d'Isbergues
6th Grote Prijs Jef Scherens
9th Grand Prix of Aargau Canton
2010
3rd Halle–Ingooigem
4th Road race, National Road Championships
5th Road race, UCI Road World Championships
7th Grote Prijs Stad Zottegem
8th Brabantse Pijl
9th Overall Tour de l'Ain
2011 (4)
1st Overall Tour de Wallonie

1st Stage 5

1st Paris–Tours
Tour of Austria

1st Points classification
1st Stage 6

2nd Overall Tour of Belgium
2nd Gran Piemonte
2nd Clásica de San Sebastián
4th Halle–Ingooigem
7th Liège–Bastogne–Liège
7th Binche–Chimay–Binche
9th Milan–San Remo
9th Strade Bianche
2012
2nd Grand Prix Cycliste de Québec
2nd Grand Prix de Wallonie
4th Tour of Flanders
5th Omloop Het Nieuwsblad
5th Strade Bianche
5th Brabantse Pijl
6th Paris–Tours
8th Gran Piemonte
9th Trofeo Deià
2013 (4)
1st Overall Tour de Wallonie

1st Points classification
1st Stages 3 & 5

1st Stage 1 Tour of Utah
3rd Gent–Wevelgem
3rd Grand Prix Cycliste de Québec
3rd Binche–Chimay–Binche
4th Paris–Roubaix
4th Grand Prix Cycliste de Montréal
5th Omloop Het Nieuwsblad
6th Overall Tour of Qatar

1st Stage 2 (TTT)

6th Strade Bianche
6th Brabantse Pijl
6th Grand Prix of Aargau Canton
7th Tour of Flanders
2014 (3)
1st Grand Prix de Wallonie
1st Grand Prix Impanis-Van Petegem
2nd Omloop Het Nieuwsblad
2nd Tour of Flanders
4th Binche–Chimay–Binche
5th Road race, UCI Road World Championships
5th Overall Eneco Tour

1st Stage 5

5th Grand Prix Cycliste de Québec
7th Grand Prix Cycliste de Montréal
8th Clásica de San Sebastián
10th Overall Tour of Belgium
10th E3 Harelbeke
2015 (4)
1st Overall Tour of Belgium

1st Stage 4

Tour de France

1st Stages 9 (TTT) & 13

1st Stage 3 Tirreno–Adriatico
2nd Overall Eneco Tour
2nd Strade Bianche
3rd Road race, National Road Championships
3rd Tour of Flanders
3rd Paris–Roubaix
3rd Paris–Tours
5th Overall Tour of Qatar
5th Amstel Gold Race
5th Vattenfall Cyclassics
6th Omloop Het Nieuwsblad
7th Overall Tour de Yorkshire
8th UCI World Tour
10th Grand Prix Cycliste de Québec
2016 (6)
1st Road race, Olympic Games
1st Overall Tirreno–Adriatico

1st Stages 1 (TTT) & 6

1st Grand Prix Cycliste de Montréal
1st Omloop Het Nieuwsblad
Tour de France

1st Stage 5
Held after Stages 5–7

1st Gullegem Koerse
2nd Grand Prix Cycliste de Québec
3rd Road race, National Road Championships
3rd Overall Tour of Qatar
4th Overall Eneco Tour

1st Stage 5 (TTT)

4th Binche–Chimay–Binche
5th Milan–San Remo
5th Clásica de San Sebastián
6th UCI World Tour
6th Strade Bianche
9th Gent–Wevelgem
10th Road race, UCI Road World Championships
2017 (7)
1st UCI World Tour
1st Overall Tour de Luxembourg

1st Points classification
1st Stages 2 & 4

1st Paris–Roubaix
1st Gent–Wevelgem
1st E3 Harelbeke
1st Omloop Het Nieuwsblad
1st Stage 1 (TTT) Tirreno–Adriatico
1st Stage 1 (TTT) Volta a la Comunitat Valenciana
2nd Tour of Flanders
2nd Grand Prix Cycliste de Québec
2nd Strade Bianche
4th Overall BinckBank Tour
6th Road race, UCI Road World Championships
7th Kuurne–Brussels–Kuurne
7th Grand Prix Cycliste de Montréal
8th Clásica de San Sebastián
10th Bretagne Classic
2018 (2)
1st Overall Tour de Yorkshire

1st Points classification

Tour de France

1st Stage 3 (TTT)
Held after Stages 3–10
Combativity award Stage 10

1st Stage 3 Tour of Oman
1st Stage 1 (TTT) Tirreno–Adriatico
1st Stage 1 (TTT) Tour de Suisse
1st Stage 3 (TTT) Volta a la Comunitat Valenciana
2nd Grand Prix Cycliste de Québec
3rd Team time trial, UCI Road World Championships
3rd E3 Harelbeke
3rd Grand Prix Cycliste de Montréal
4th Paris–Roubaix
4th Clásica de San Sebastián
5th UCI World Tour
5th Tour of Flanders
6th Overall BinckBank Tour
8th Dwars door Vlaanderen
2019 (3)
1st Grand Prix Cycliste de Montréal
1st Stage 3 Volta a la Comunitat Valenciana
2nd Overall Tour de Yorkshire

1st Stage 4

2nd Clásica de San Sebastián
2nd Omloop Het Nieuwsblad
3rd E3 Binckbank Classic
3rd Grand Prix Cycliste de Québec
4th Overall BinckBank Tour
6th Strade Bianche
6th Bretagne Classic
7th Primus Classic
8th Road race, UCI Road World Championships
10th Tour of Flanders
Tour de France

Held after Stages 1–2
Combativity award Stage 18

2020
2nd Overall Tour de Wallonie
3rd Gran Trittico Lombardo
8th Milan–San Remo
8th Strade Bianche
2021
3rd Tour of Flanders
6th E3 Saxo Bank Classic
7th Overall Étoile de Bessèges
7th Dwars door Vlaanderen
8th Kuurne–Brussels–Kuurne
8th Paris–Camembert
Combativity award Stage 6 Tour de France
2022
3rd Overall Tour du Limousin
3rd Omloop Het Nieuwsblad
4th UCI Gravel World Championships
4th Binche–Chimay–Binche
5th Overall Tour de Wallonie
5th Tour du Finistère
9th Circuit Franco-Belge
2023 (1)
1st Boucles de l'Aulne
4th Tour du Finistère

=== General classification results timeline ===
Grand Tour general classification results
Grand Tour	2007	2008	2009	2010	2011	2012	2013	2014	2015	2016	2017	2018	2019	2020	2021	2022	2023
Giro d'Italia	Did not contest during his career																
Tour de France	—	—	85	—	—	—	—	38	DNF	44	58	28	36	50	97	—	—
/ Vuelta a España	—	66	—	49	82	—	—	—	—	—	—	—	—	—	—	—	—
Major stage race general classification results
Major stage race	2007	2008	2009	2010	2011	2012	2013	2014	2015	2016	2017	2018	2019	2020	2021	2022	2023
Paris–Nice	—	—	—	—	—	—	—	41	—	—	—	—	—	—	—	—	—
Tirreno–Adriatico	—	—	59	12	29	DNF	49	—	48	1	36	20	16	—	34	57	61
Volta a Catalunya	Did not contest during his career																
Tour of the Basque Country	Did not contest during his career																
Tour de Romandie	Did not contest during his career																
Critérium du Dauphiné	—	—	—	—	—	—	—	45	—	76	—	—	—	—	81	93	76
Tour de Suisse	—	54	82	43	60	DNF	121	—	33	—	48	29	48	NH	—	—	—

=== Classics results timeline ===
Monument	2007	2008	2009	2010	2011	2012	2013	2014	2015	2016	2017	2018	2019	2020	2021	2022	2023
Milan–San Remo	—	53	13	47	9	69	36	25	19	5	21	17	42	8	13	35	—
Tour of Flanders	DNF	8	35	39	22	4	7	2	3	DNF	2	5	10	—	3	15	62
Paris–Roubaix	29	27	38	27	—	—	4	17	3	—	1	4	12	NH	32	17	37
Liège–Bastogne–Liège	—	—	—	—	7	73	63	—	—	—	11	—	52	DNF	40	—	—
Giro di Lombardia	—	—	—	15	12	17	19	—	—	DNF	—	—	—	—	—	—	—
Classic	2007	2008	2009	2010	2011	2012	2013	2014	2015	2016	2017	2018	2019	2020	2021	2022	2023
Omloop Het Nieuwsblad	84	—	4	108	30	5	5	2	6	1	1	50	2	13	33	3	34
Kuurne–Brussels–Kuurne	—	—	—	DNF	81	101	NH	24	69	74	7	56	—	26	8	51	81
Strade Bianche	—	—	—	13	9	5	6	—	2	6	2	34	6	8	19	41	45
E3 Saxo Bank Classic (Note: Race known as E3 Prijs Vlaanderen from 2007 to 2011, E3 Harelbeke from 2012 to 2018 and the E3 BinckBank Classic in 2019.)	89	3	28	26	—	26	24	10	88	—	1	3	3	NH	6	42	DNF
Gent–Wevelgem	—	170	—	—	13	27	3	28	36	9	1	14	20	—	12	17	85
Dwars door Vlaanderen	—	74	—	11	22	—	—	—	—	32	—	8	—	NH	7	16	89
Scheldeprijs	102	—	—	—	—	—	—	89	—	—	—	—	—	—	—	—	—
Brabantse Pijl	—	—	—	8	15	5	6	—	—	—	—	—	—	—	12	—	DNF
Amstel Gold Race	—	84	—	—	24	36	16	40	5	—	12	14	14	NH	26	24	26
La Flèche Wallonne	—	—	—	—	15	40	—	—	—	—	—	—	—	—	—	—	—
Clásica de San Sebastián	—	—	—	11	3	13	18	8	DNF	5	8	4	2	NH	—	—	—
Hamburg Cyclassics	8	79	65	—	—	38	—	61	5	—	30	—	—	Not held		27	45
Bretagne Classic	—	7	—	24	—	37	71	76	73	46	10	—	6	—	—	—	43
Grand Prix Cycliste de Québec	Race did not exist			—	—	2	3	5	10	2	2	2	3	Not held		13	36
Grand Prix Cycliste de Montréal	Race did not exist			—	—	14	4	7	37	1	7	3	1	Not held		16	60
Paris–Tours	48	132	14	16	1	6	48	39	3	77	—	—	—	—	41	—	58

=== Major championships results timeline ===
	2007	2008	2009	2010	2011	2012	2013	2014	2015	2016	2017	2018	2019	2020	2021	2022	2023
Olympic Games	NH	—	Not held			92	Not held			1	Not held				DNF	Not held	
World Championships	62	17	44	5	175	25	23	5	23	10	6	50	8	21	—	—	—
European Championships	Race did not exist									—	—	25	—	27	—	—	—
National Championships	30	4	4	4	27	27	7	9	3	3	62	14	18	31	29	40	45

Legend
—	Did not compete
DNF	Did not finish
NH	Not held
IP	In progress

== Honours and awards ==
- Crystal Bicycle Best Professional Cyclist: 2014, 2015, 2016, 2017
- Flandrien of the Year: 2008, 2013, 2014, 2015, 2016, 2017
- Vlaamse Reus: 2016
- Belgian Sportsman of the Year: 2016
- Honorary Citizen of Dendermonde: 2016
- VeloNews: Classics Rider of the Year: 2017
- Swiss Mendrisio d'Or: 2017
- CyclingRanking – Overall ranking (26th place)
