= 2017 E3 Harelbeke =

Cycling race

2017 UCI World Tour, race 11 of 37

Race details
- Dates: 24 March 2017
- Stages: 1
- Distance: 206.1 km (128.1 mi)
- Winning time: 4h 48' 17"

Results
	Winner	Greg Van Avermaet (BEL)	(BMC Racing Team)
	Second	Philippe Gilbert (BEL)	(Quick-Step Floors)
	Third	Oliver Naesen (BEL)	(AG2R La Mondiale)

The 2017 Record Bank E3 Harelbeke was a road cycling one-day race that took place on 24 March. It was the 60th edition of the E3 Harelbeke and was the eleventh event of the 2017 UCI World Tour.

In a three-up sprint finish of Belgian riders, Greg Van Avermaet (BMC Racing Team) took the race victory ahead of national champion Philippe Gilbert from the Quick-Step Floors team, while the podium placings were completed by AG2R La Mondiale's Oliver Naesen.

== Teams ==
As E3 Harelbeke was a UCI World Tour event, all eighteen UCI WorldTeams were invited automatically and obliged to enter a team in the race. Seven UCI Professional Continental teams competed, completing the 25-team peloton.

UCI WorldTeams

- AG2R La Mondiale
- Astana
- Bahrain–Merida
- BMC Racing Team
- Bora–Hansgrohe
- Cannondale–Drapac
- Team Dimension Data
- FDJ
- Team Katusha–Alpecin
- LottoNL–Jumbo
- Lotto–Soudal
- Movistar Team
- Orica–Scott
- Quick-Step Floors
- Team Sky
- Team Sunweb
- Trek–Segafredo
- UAE Team Emirates

UCI Professional Continental teams

- Direct Énergie
- Gazprom–RusVelo
- Roompot–Nederlandse Loterij
- Sport Vlaanderen–Baloise
- Vérandas Willems–Crelan
- Wanty–Groupe Gobert
- WB Veranclassic Aqua Protect

== Route ==
The 206.1-kilometre (128.1 mi)-long E3 Harelbeke commenced in the centre of Harelbeke and moved east to its most eastern point at Ninove after 67 kilometres (42 miles) before turning west and traveling through the Flemish Ardennes with fifteen climbs. The Tiegemberg, the last climb of the day, was located 20 kilometres (12 miles) from the finish.

=== Categorised climbs and cobbles ===
Climbs and cobbled sections in the 2017 E3 Harelbeke
No.	Name	Distance from		Surface	Length (metres)	Gradient (%)	
No.	Name	Start (km)	Finish (km)	Surface	Length (metres)	(ave.)	(max.)
–	Beaucarnestraat	28.8	177.3	cobbles	1200	—	
1	Katteberg	29.0	177.1	asphalt	600	6.7%	8.%
–	Holleweg	30.8	175.3	cobbles	1500	—	
–	Paddestraat	42.3	163.8	cobbles	2300	—	
2	La Houppe	93.2	112.9	asphalt	3440	3.32%	10%
3	Kruisberg	109.5	96.6	asphalt & cobbles	800	4.8%	9%
4	Knokteberg	117.4	88.7	asphalt	1530	5.3%	13.3%
5	Hotondberg	121.3	84.8	asphalt	1200	4%	8%
6	Kortekeer	128.4	77.7	asphalt	1000	6.4%	17%
7	Taaienberg	133.3	72.8	cobbles	650	9.5%	18%
8	Boigneberg	139.6	66.5	asphalt	2180	5.8%	15%
9	Eikenberg	144.1	62.0	cobbles	1200	5.5%	11%
10	Stationsberg	149.5	56.6	cobbles	460	3.2%	5.7%
–	Mariaborrestraat	150.2	55.9	cobbles	2000	—	
11	Kapelberg	159.5	46.6	asphalt	900	4%	7%
12	Paterberg	164.4	41.7	cobbles	700	12%	20%
13	Oude Kwaremont	167.2	38.9	cobbles	2200	4.2%	11%
14	Karnemelkbeekstraat	175.0	31.1	asphalt	1530	4.9%	7.3%
–	Varentstraat	182.6	23.5	cobbles	2000	—	
15	Tiegemberg	186.1	20.0	asphalt	1000	6.5%	9%

== Result ==
Result
Rank	Rider	Team	Time
1	Greg Van Avermaet (BEL)	BMC Racing Team	4h 48' 17"
2	Philippe Gilbert (BEL)	Quick-Step Floors	+ 0"
3	Oliver Naesen (BEL)	AG2R La Mondiale	+ 0"
4	Luke Durbridge (AUS)	Orica–Scott	+ 40"
5	Lukas Pöstlberger (AUT)	Bora–Hansgrohe	+ 41"
6	Michael Valgren (DEN)	Astana	+ 52"
7	Sonny Colbrelli (ITA)	Bahrain–Merida	+ 52"
8	Tom Boonen (BEL)	Quick-Step Floors	+ 52"
9	Dylan van Baarle (NED)	Cannondale–Drapac	+ 52"
10	Alberto Bettiol (ITA)	Cannondale–Drapac	+ 52"
