= Molenberg (Zwalm) =

Coordinates: 50.86053°N 3.70394°E

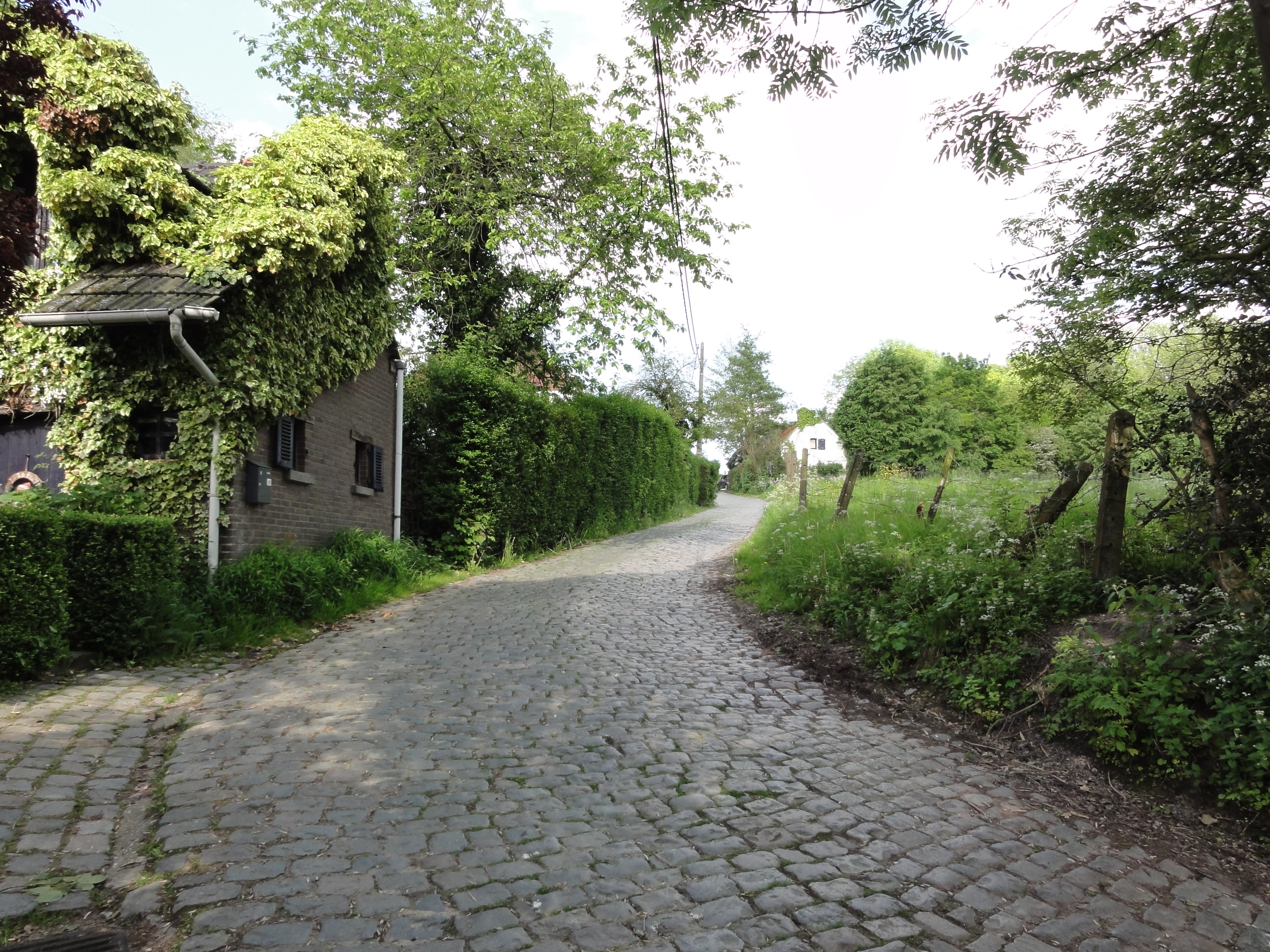
- Molenberg in Zwalm
- Location: Flanders, Belgium
- Start: Sint-Denijs-Boekel
- Gain in altitude: 32 m (105 ft)
- Length of climb: 463 m (1,519 ft)
- Maximum elevation: 56 m (184 ft)
- Average gradient: 7 %
- Maximum gradient: 14.2 %

The Molenberg (Mill Hill) is a hill in the municipality of Zwalm, in the Belgian province of East Flanders, with its top at 56 m. It is one of the many hills in the Zwalm region, just north of the Flemish Ardennes. The road of the Molenberg has a roughly-paved cobbled surface, which is classified and protected as a landscape monument. At the foot of the hill there is a 13th-century water mill, the Moldergemmolen, from which the hill takes its name.

== Cycling ==
The hill is best known from road bicycle racing, where it is a regular climb in the Flemish races in spring, most notably the Tour of Flanders. It is one of the most iconic climbs in the region, because of its steep slopes and narrow badly-surfaced cobbled road. Its average gradient is 7% with its steepest point, 14.2%, in the middle of the climb in a right-hand bend.

The climb is also regularly included in the Omloop Het Nieuwsblad and the Tour of Flanders for Women.
