= 2015 Omloop Het Nieuwsblad =

2015 UCI Europe Tour
- Event poster with previous winner Ian Stannard

Race details
- Dates: 28 February 2015
- Stages: 1
- Distance: 200.2 km (124.4 mi)
- Winning time: 4h 58' 41"

Results
	Winner	Ian Stannard (GBR)	(Team Sky)
	Second	Niki Terpstra (NED)	(Etixx–Quick-Step)
	Third	Tom Boonen (BEL)	(Etixx–Quick-Step)

The 2015 Omloop Het Nieuwsblad was the 70th edition of the Omloop Het Nieuwsblad road cycling race, traditionally seen as the beginning of the cobbled classics season along with the Kuurne–Brussels–Kuurne the following day. It was rated as a 1.HC race as part of the 2015 UCI Europe Tour. The race took place on 28 February 2015, starting and finishing in the city of Ghent.

Ian Stannard (Team Sky), the defending champion from 2014, won the race in a two-man sprint ahead of Niki Terpstra (Etixx–Quick-Step). Terpstra's teammate Tom Boonen was the third.

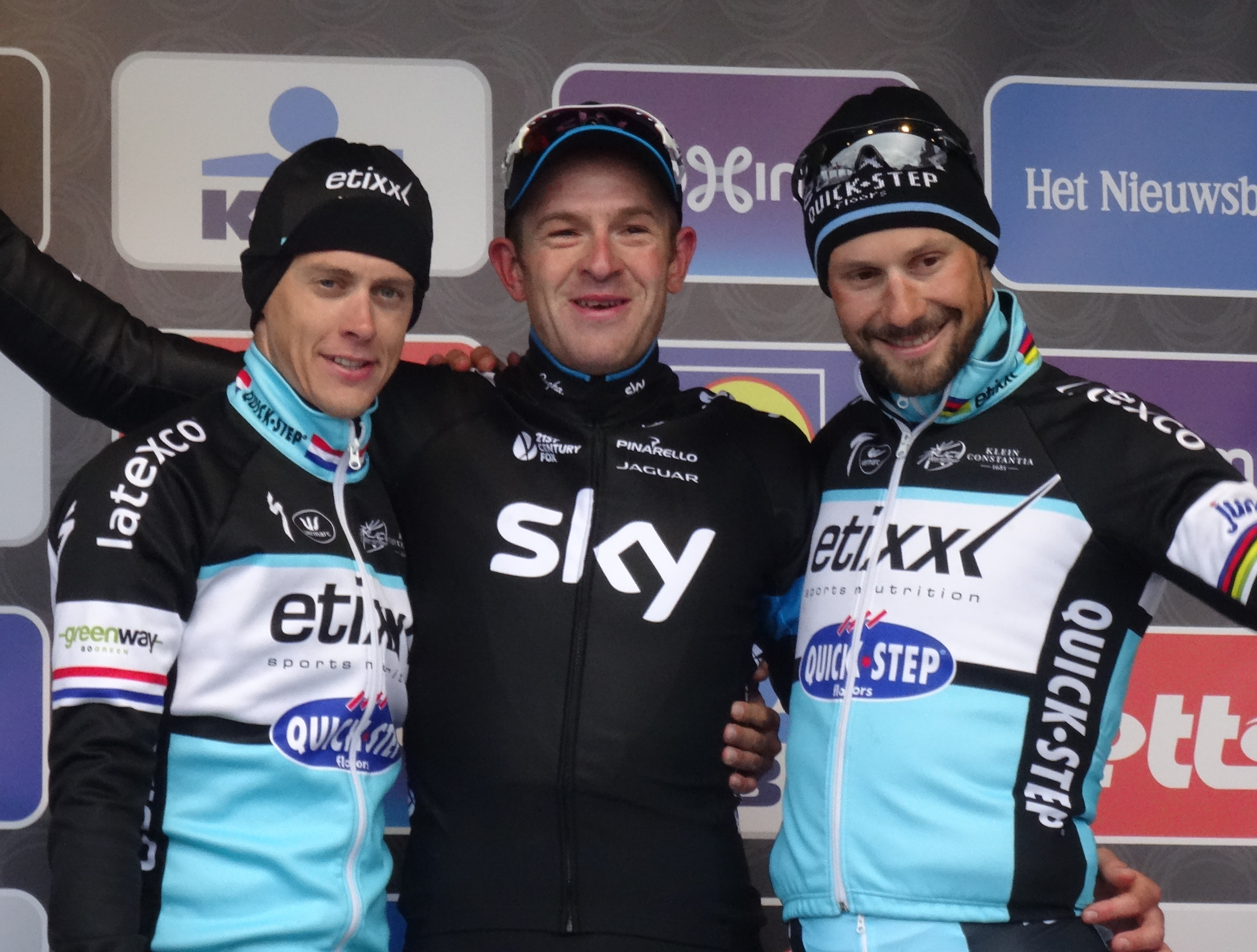
Ian Stannard (centre), Niki Terpstra (left) and Tom Boonen on the podium after the race

== Preview ==
The Omloop Het Nieuwsblad was held over a challenging, hilly course, similar in style to the Tour of Flanders, one of the cycling monuments and the most important cycling race in Flanders. Omloop Het Nieuwsblad was, however, significantly shorter at 200.2 kilometres (124.4 miles). The races shared many climbs in the race, such as the Taaienberg, the Valkenberg and the Molenberg; Omloop Het Nieuwsblad also included the Muur van Geraardsbergen, which was a decisive part of the Tour of Flanders until its removal in 2012. Historically, the race was normally won by a small group rather than by a bunch of sprinters because of the difficult route. The 2015 race included a new climb, the Kaperij, after 120 kilometres (75 miles).

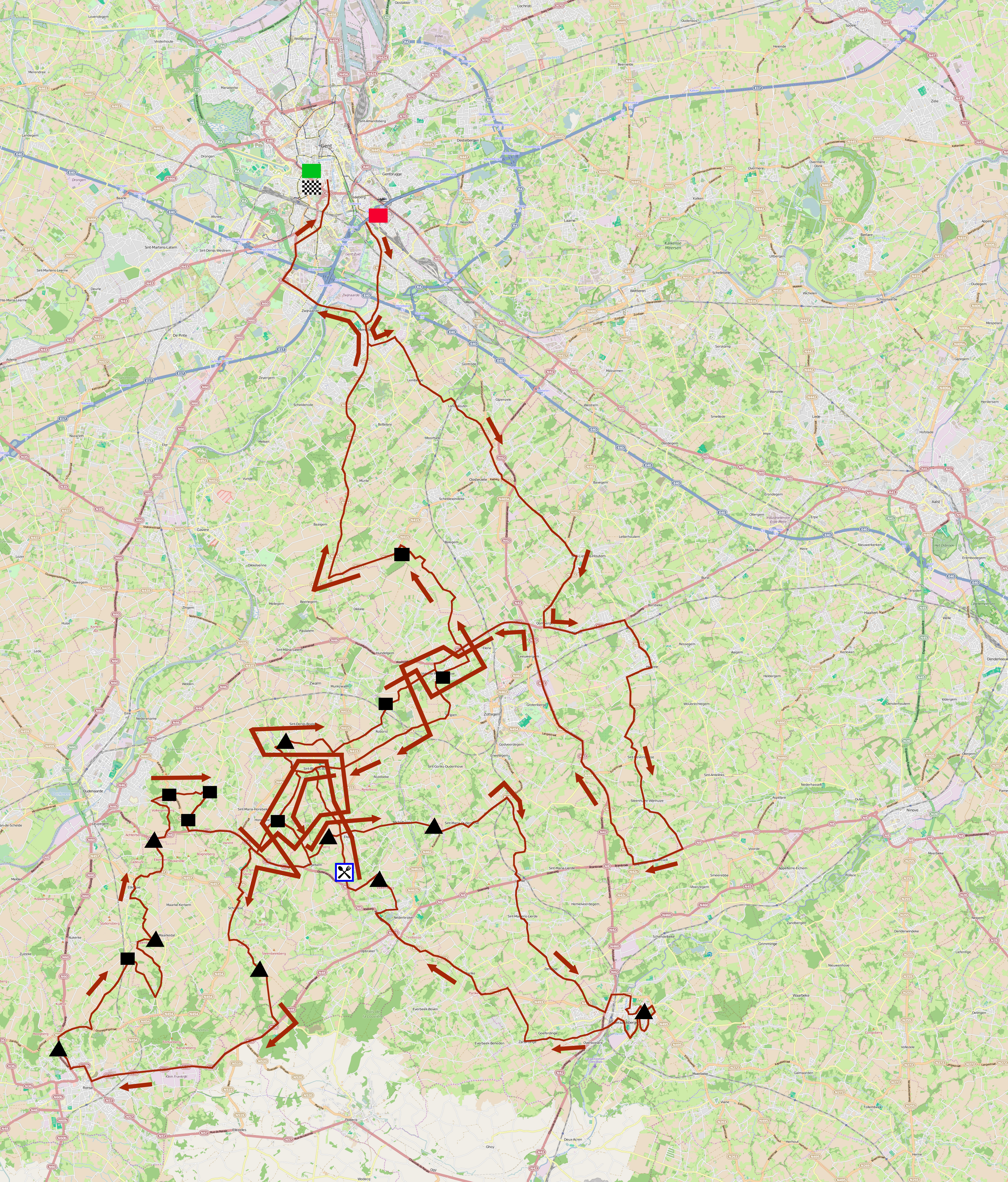
The route of the 2015 Omloop Het Nieuwsblad

The race was also notable for the weather: frequently held in rain and cold conditions, which added to the difficulty. The weather has caused the cancellation of the race − and also of Kuurne–Brussels–Kuurne the following day − on several occasions, and the riders had to pay considerable attention to keeping warm during the race. This was especially true because many of the riders used hot-weather races in the Middle East (such as the Tour of Qatar, the Dubai Tour and the Tour of Oman) to prepare for the European classics season. The importance of this was demonstrated in 2014, when Ian Stannard (Team Sky) beat Greg Van Avermaet (BMC Racing Team) in a sprint principally because he had managed to keep warmer through the race.

On the opening day of the Belgian cycling season, Omloop Het Nieuwsblad held a particular prominence for Belgian cyclists. 54 of the 69 previous editions had been won by Belgian cyclists, though the victory of Sep Vanmarcke (LottoNL–Jumbo) in 2012 was the only Belgian win in the past six years.

Pre-race favourites included Stannard, Vanmarcke, Niki Terpstra (Etixx–Quick-Step), and Alexander Kristoff (Team Katusha). Tom Boonen (Etixx–Quick-Step) was also considered a favourite, despite the fact that Omloop Het Nieuwsblad was the only cobbled classic that he had not won. Much pre-race coverage also focused on the participation of Bradley Wiggins (Team Sky), the former champion of the Tour de France, who was participating in the event for the first time since 2006 as part of his preparation for Paris–Roubaix.

== Teams ==
23 teams were selected to take part in the race. As for 1.HC event, the race organisers could invite up UCI ProTeams to make up 70% of the line-up; however, only 10 ProTeams were invited, along with 13 Professional Continental teams. Each team was limited to eight riders, for a maximum field of 184 riders.

ProTeams

- Team Sky
- AG2R La Mondiale
- BMC Racing Team
- Etixx–Quick-Step
- FDJ
- IAM Cycling
- Lotto–Soudal
- Team Giant–Alpecin
- Team Katusha
- LottoNL–Jumbo

Professional Continental teams

- Bora–Argon 18
- Bretagne–Séché Environnement
- CCC–Sprandi–Polkowice
- Cofidis
- Cult Energy Pro Cycling
- MTN–Qhubeka
- Nippo–Vini Fantini
- Southeast Pro Cycling
- Team Europcar
- Team Roompot
- Topsport Vlaanderen–Baloise
- Wanty–Groupe Gobert
- Androni Giocattoli

== Race overview ==
An early breakaway was formed by Alexis Gougeard (AG2R La Mondiale), Matt Brammeier (MTN–Qhubeka), Christophe Laborie (Bretagne–Séché Environnement), Michael Reihs (Cult Energy Pro Cycling), Kevin Van Melsen (Wanty–Groupe Gobert), Louis Verhelst (Cofidis), Jarosław Marycz (CCC–Sprandi–Polkowice), Sean De Bie (Lotto–Soudal) and Albert Timmer (Team Giant–Alpecin). They broke away from the pack in the first 10 kilometres (6 miles) and built a six-minute lead. The main group did not take up the chase in earnest until they had passed the Muur van Geraardsbergen with 117 kilometres (73 miles) remaining, when Etixx–Quick-Step, Team Sky and LottoNL–Jumbo took control. Bradley Wiggins and Bernhard Eisel (both Team Sky) spent a lot of time on the front of the main peloton, reducing both the lead of the group ahead and the size of the main pack. Tom Boonen (Etixx–Quick-Step) put in an attack on the Taaienberg (as he had done in many previous editions of the race) and briefly formed a small leading group, but the pack reformed soon afterwards. Luke Rowe (Team Sky) attacked and joined with Brammeier and Timmer, the only remaining riders in the breakaway; Stijn Vandenbergh (Etixx–Quick-Step) led the peloton in chasing this move down.

The key moment of the race came on the cobbled section at the cobbled section at Haaghoek with 43 kilometres (27 miles) remaining and across the Leberg 3 kilometres (2 miles) later. Vandenbergh and Boonen both put in attacks, as did Sep Vanmarcke (LottoNL–Jumbo). Vanmarcke then suffered a puncture, and only four riders remained at the front of the race: Vandenbergh, Boonen and Niki Terpstra from Etixx–Quick-Step and Ian Stannard (Team Sky). The three Etixx–Quick-Step riders led the group, with Stannard following their wheels rather than putting any effort into leading. A group behind was formed by Vanmarcke, Greg Van Avermaet (BMC Racing Team) and Zdeněk Štybar (Etixx–Quick-Step), which meant that the lead group had to ride hard to maintain their lead. At one point, Boonen gained a small lead across a cobbled section, but Stannard was able to bring the group back together. The chasing group came close to catching the leaders, but Vandenbergh's work prevented this and the four riders came into the final 5 kilometres (3 miles) together.

With three riders in the lead group, Etixx–Quick-Step were heavy favourites to win the race. Boonen was the first to put in an attack, 4.5 kilometres (2.8 miles) from the finish. Stannard put in a measured response and was able to catch him; Terpstra then immediately put in another attack. He was caught by his own teammate, Vandenbergh; this incident caused significant confusion after the race. Stannard was the freshest rider in the group, as he had not needed to put any significant effort in the previous section of the race, and he attacked inside the final 3 kilometres (1.9 miles); only Tersptra was able to hold his wheel. Since Boonen was never more than five seconds behind the pair, Stannard did most of the work until the last 300 metres (984.3 feet), when Terpstra passed in front of him. Terpstra was the first to start the sprint; Stannard was able to sit behind him and come past in the final 50 metres (164 feet) as Terpstra began to fade.

Stannard therefore won his second successive Omloop Het Nieuwsblad with Terpstra second. Boonen finished third, eight seconds behind, with Vandenbergh fourth. Many riders and observers were surprised that Stannard had managed to overcome the numerical disadvantage to win the race. Patrick Lefevere (manager of Etixx–Quick-Step) was annoyed at Stannard's failure to work with his riders in the finale, while Boonen regretted having attacked, suggesting that waiting for a sprint would have been a more effective way to win the race. Stannard attributed his victory in part to the difficult tactical situation Etixx–Quick-Step faced, with a strong group only a few seconds behind for a long period of racing.

== General classification ==
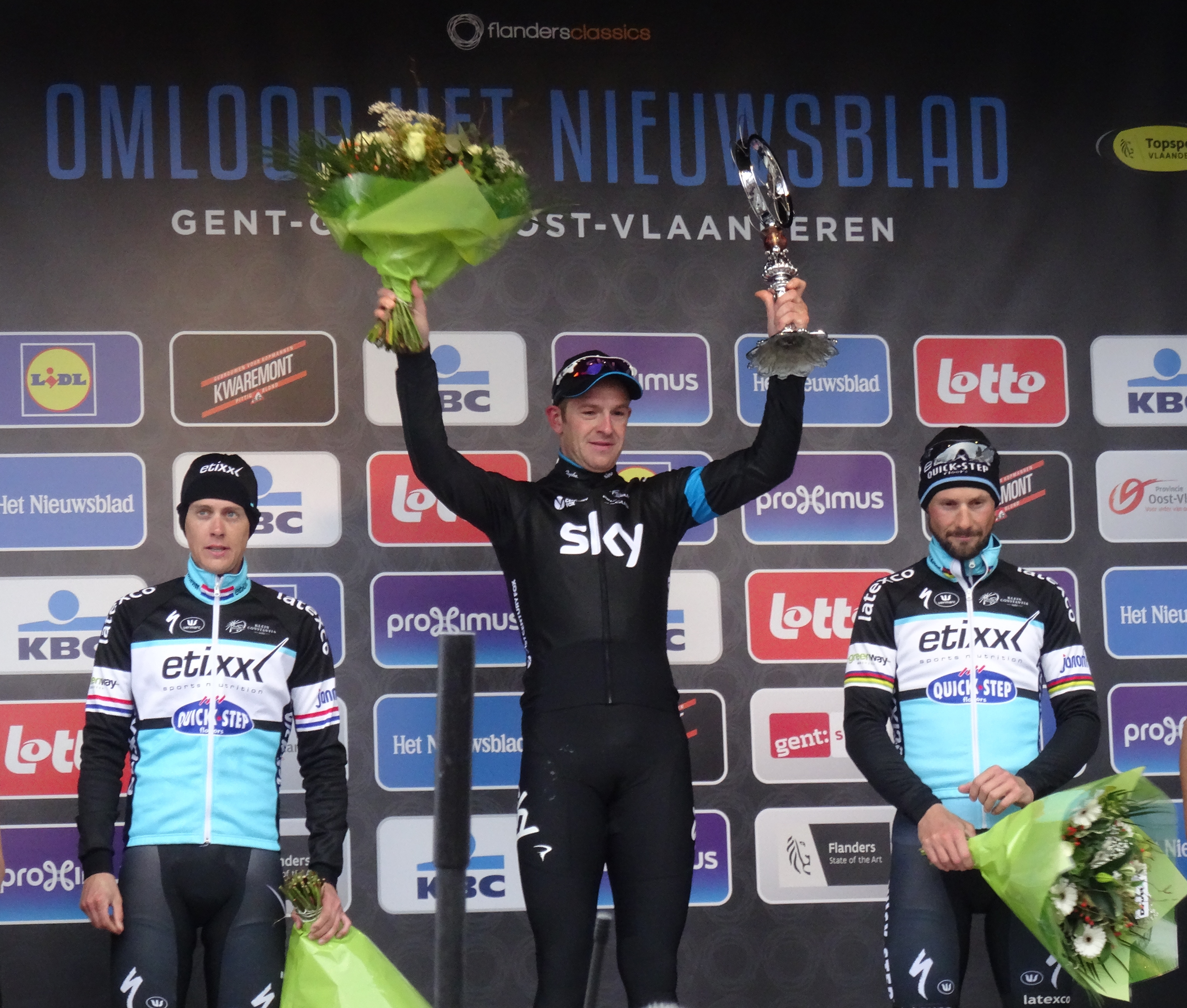
The victory ceremony

Final general classification
Rank	Rider	Team	Time
1	Ian Stannard (GBR)	Team Sky	4h 58' 41"
2	Niki Terpstra (NED)	Etixx–Quick-Step	+ 0"
3	Tom Boonen (BEL)	Etixx–Quick-Step	+ 8"
4	Stijn Vandenbergh (BEL)	Etixx–Quick-Step	+ 15"
5	Sep Vanmarcke (BEL)	LottoNL–Jumbo	+ 1' 24"
6	Greg Van Avermaet (BEL)	BMC Racing Team	+ 1' 24"
7	Zdeněk Štybar (CZE)	Etixx–Quick-Step	+ 1' 29"
8	Philippe Gilbert (BEL)	BMC Racing Team	+ 4' 35"
9	Luke Rowe (GBR)	Team Sky	+ 4' 55"
10	Arnaud Démare (FRA)	FDJ	+ 4' 55"
