= 2013 Milan–San Remo =

2013 UCI World Tour, race 4 of 28
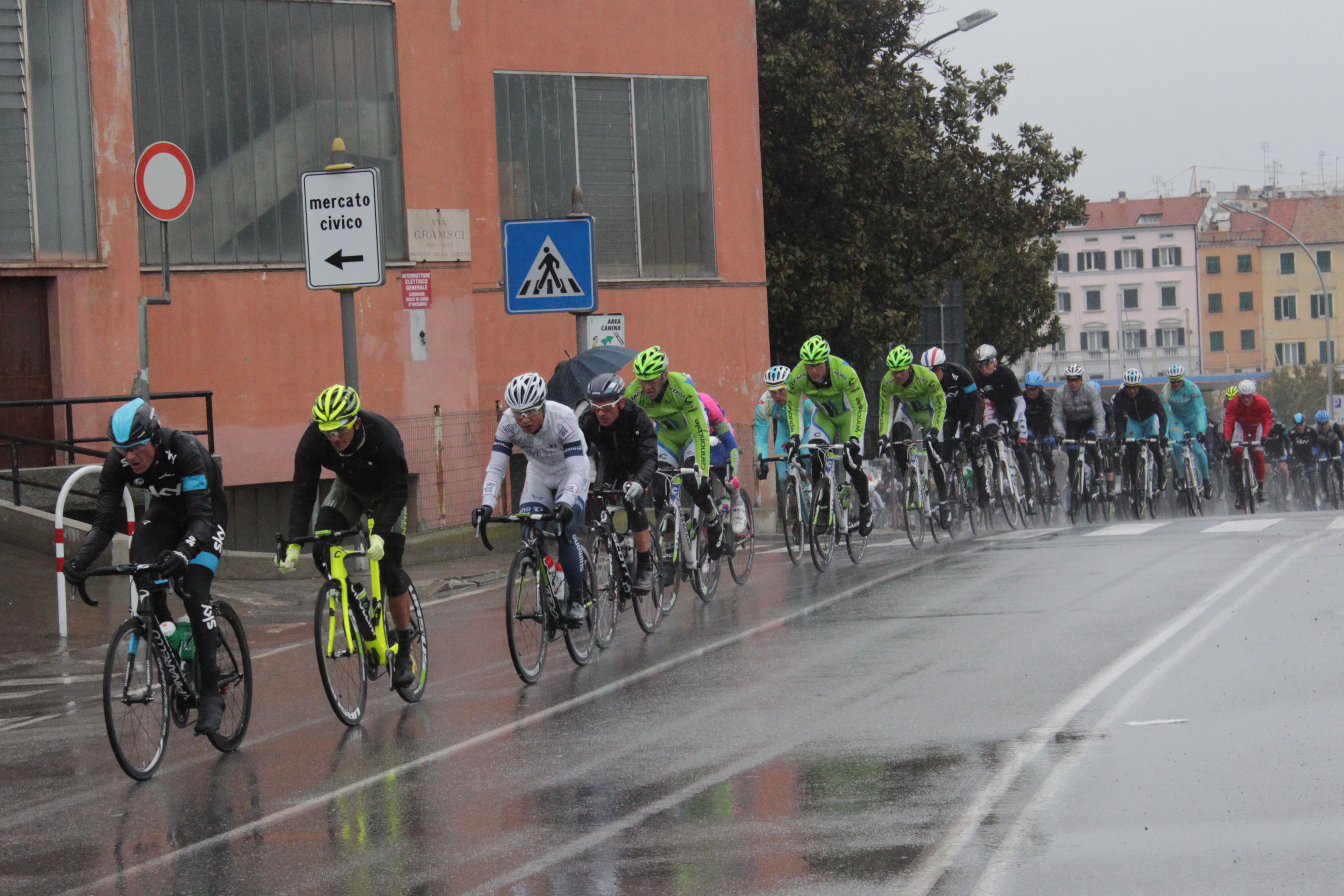
- The peloton in Savona

Race details
- Dates: 17 March 2013
- Stages: 1
- Distance: 246 km (153 mi)
- Winning time: 5h 37' 20"

Results
	Winner	Gerald Ciolek (GER)	(MTN–Qhubeka)
	Second	Peter Sagan (SVK)	(Cannondale)
	Third	Fabian Cancellara (SUI)	(RadioShack–Leopard)

The 2013 Milan–San Remo was the 104th running of the Milan–San Remo single-day cycling race. It was held on 17 March over a shortened distance of 246 kilometres (152.9 miles), and was the fourth race of the 2013 UCI World Tour season. For the first time in 31 years, Milan–San Remo was held on a Sunday, after race organisers requested to change and move into line with several of the other Classic races.

Heavy snowfall and bad weather forced organisers to shorten the race from 298 kilometres (185.2 miles) to 246 kilometres (152.9 miles) eliminating two key climbs – the Passo del Turchino and Le Manie – and arranging a bus transfer, for the race to begin a second time. A few riders elected not to take the restart, including Omega Pharma–Quick-Step's Tom Boonen, who protested against the decision to let all riders rejoin the main group, despite several riders having lost contact before the race was neutralised.

After Boonen's team-mate Sylvain Chavanel and Team Sky rider Ian Stannard had led a reduced peloton over the summit of the final climb, the Poggio di San Remo, a group of six formed on the descent from the Poggio, including pre-race favourites Peter Sagan (Cannondale) and 2008 winner Fabian Cancellara of RadioShack–Leopard. The sextet remained together until the finish, where Gerald Ciolek prevailed in the sprint for MTN–Qhubeka, ahead of Sagan and Cancellara.

== Teams ==
As Milan–San Remo was a UCI World Tour event, all UCI ProTeams were invited automatically and obligated to send a squad. Originally, eighteen ProTeams were invited to the race, with seven other squads given wildcard places, and as such, would have formed the event's 25-team peloton. Originally admitted to the event as a wildcard, Team Katusha subsequently regained their ProTour status after an appeal to the Court of Arbitration for Sport. Each of the 25 teams entered eight riders to the race, making up a starting peloton of 200 riders. Among the peloton was the first black South African rider in the race's history, MTN–Qhubeka's Songezo Jim.

The 25 teams that competed in the race were:

- Ag2r–La Mondiale
- Androni Giocattoli–Venezuela
- Argos–Shimano
- Astana
- Bardiani Valvole–CSF Inox
- Blanco Pro Cycling
- BMC Racing Team
- Cannondale
- Team Europcar
- Euskaltel–Euskadi
- FDJ
- Garmin–Sharp
- IAM Cycling
- Team Katusha
- Lampre–Merida
- Lotto–Belisol
- Movistar Team
- MTN–Qhubeka
- Omega Pharma–Quick-Step
- Orica–GreenEDGE
- RadioShack–Leopard
- Saxo–Tinkoff
- Team Sky
- Vacansoleil–DCM
- Vini Fantini–Selle Italia

== Results ==
	Cyclist	Team	Time
1	Gerald Ciolek (GER)	MTN–Qhubeka	5h 37' 20"
2	Peter Sagan (SVK)	Cannondale	s.t.
3	Fabian Cancellara (SUI)	RadioShack–Leopard	s.t.
4	Sylvain Chavanel (FRA)	Omega Pharma–Quick-Step	s.t.
5	Luca Paolini (ITA)	Team Katusha	s.t.
6	Ian Stannard (GBR)	Team Sky	s.t.
7	Taylor Phinney (USA)	BMC Racing Team	s.t.
8	Alexander Kristoff (NOR)	Team Katusha	+ 14"
9	Mark Cavendish (GBR)	Omega Pharma–Quick-Step	+ 14"
10	Bernhard Eisel (AUT)	Team Sky	+ 14"
