= Ian Stannard =

English racing cyclist

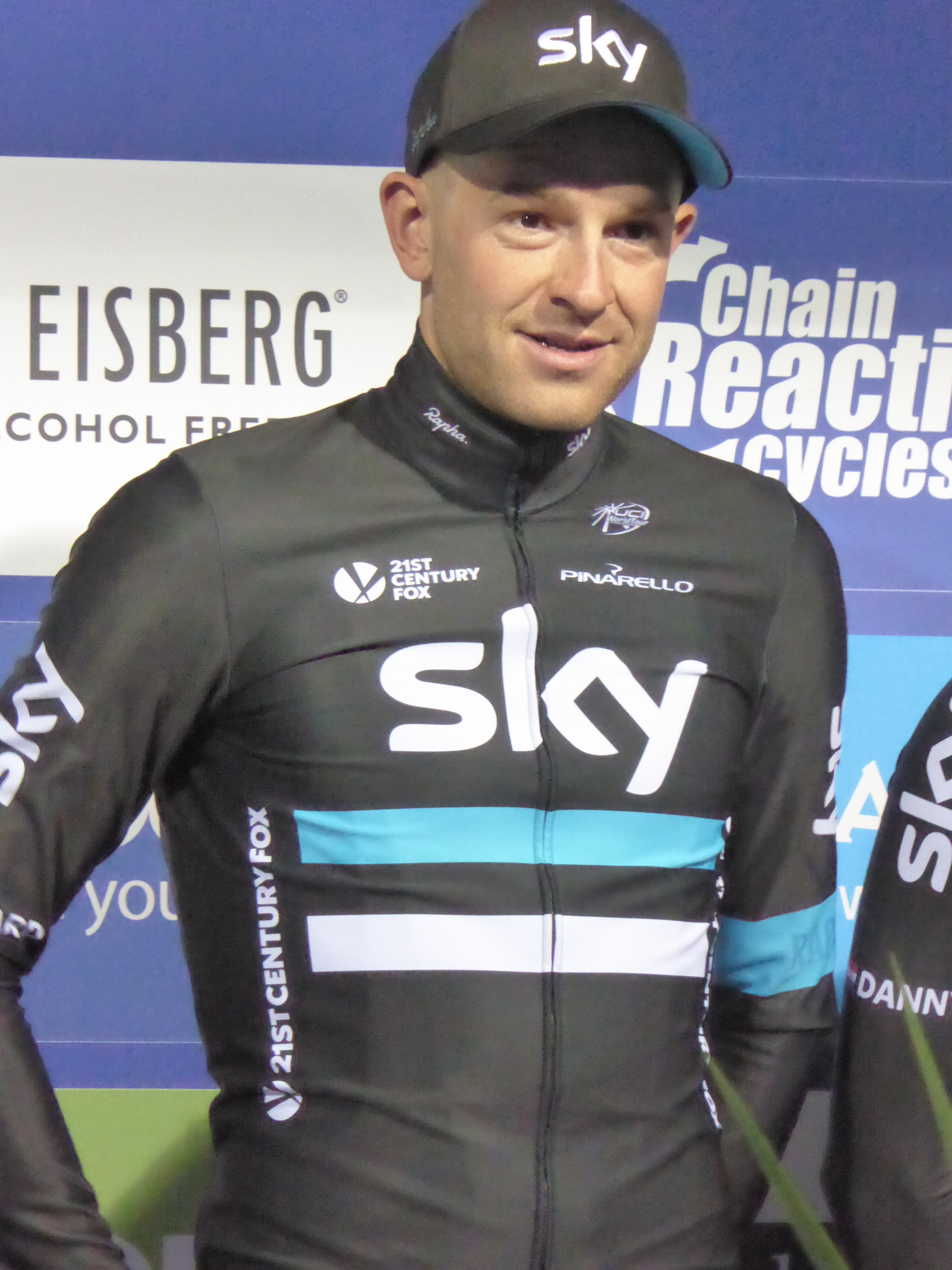
- Stannard at the 2016 Tour of Britain

Personal information
- Full name: Ian Dexter Stannard
- Nickname: Yogi
- Born: 25 May 1987 (age 39) Chelmsford, Essex, England
- Height: 1.89 m (6 ft 2 in)
- Weight: 83 kg (183 lb)

Cycling career
- Sport: Cycling
- Current team: Netcompany–Ineos
- Disciplines: Track; Road
- Role: Rider (retired); Directeur sportif
- Rider type: Classics specialist Domestique; Rouleur

Amateur teams
- 2007: 100% Me
- 2007: T-Mobile Team (stagiaire)

Professional teams
- 2006: Van Vliet–EBH Advocaten
- 2008: Landbouwkrediet–Tönissteiner
- 2009: ISD
- 2010–2020: Team Sky

Managerial teams
- 2021–2022: Trinity Racing
- 2023–: INEOS Grenadiers

Major wins
- One-day races and Classics National Road Race Championships (2012) Omloop Het Nieuwsblad (2014, 2015)
Medal record
Men's track cycling
Representing Great Britain
European Championships
Gold medal – first place	2006 Athens	Under-23 team pursuit
Representing England
Commonwealth Youth Games
Bronze medal – third place	2004 Bendigo	Individual pursuit
Bronze medal – third place	2004 Bendigo	Scratch
Men's road cycling
Representing England
Commonwealth Youth Games
Gold medal – first place	2004 Bendigo	Time trial

Ian Dexter Stannard (born 25 May 1987) is a British former professional track and road racing cyclist, who rode professionally in 2006 and from 2008 to 2020 for the Van Vliet–EBH Advocaten, Landbouwkrediet–Tönissteiner, ISD and INEOS Grenadiers teams, before retiring after being diagnosed with rheumatoid arthritis. He now works as a directeur sportif for UCI WorldTeam Netcompany–Ineos, having previously held the same role for UCI Continental team Trinity Racing.

During his professional career, Stannard took seven victories including two consecutive wins in the Omloop Het Nieuwsblad one-day race (2014 and 2015), two stage victories at the Tour of Britain (2016 and 2018), and the 2012 British National Road Race Championships. As a domestique, Stannard was also a part of multiple Grand Tour general classification successes by Chris Froome.

== Career ==
=== Early career ===
Born in Chelmsford, Stannard grew up in Milton Keynes. He initially focused on both road and track cycling, winning a gold medal in the time trial at the 2004 Commonwealth Youth Games, and a gold in the Under-23 Team Pursuit at the 2006 UEC European Track Championships, alongside future Sky teammate Geraint Thomas. Stannard made his professional road debut in August 2007 joining T-Mobile Team as a trainee. He rode for Landbouwkrediet–Tönissteiner in 2008 and came third overall in the Tour of Britain riding for the Great Britain team. In 2009 he joined the new ISD team, and was selected to ride the Giro d'Italia, aged just 21. Stannard finished 160th at the Giro.

=== Team Sky (2010–2020) ===
==== 2010–2011 ====
Stannard joined the new British Pro Tour team Team Sky on an initial two-year contract for the start of the 2010 season, and focused more on the Classics and one day races. He took a third place in freezing conditions in Kuurne–Brussels–Kuurne, and completed a Team Sky 1–2–3 at the British National Road Race Championships behind teammates Geraint Thomas and Peter Kennaugh.

Stannard almost took victory in the 2011 Gent–Wevelgem, after breaking away on the final climb, the Monteberg. He was part of a move with Peter Sagan, Maciej Bodnar (both from Liquigas–Cannondale) and Sylvain Chavanel (Quick-Step) with 34 kilometres (21 miles) to cover until the finish. The quartet kept clear of the chasing peloton until Stannard broke free and crossed the flamme rouge alone. He was passed by the field with some 500 metres (1,600 ft) to go, as Tom Boonen sprinted to victory. He obtained his first professional win at the Tour of Austria, winning stage 5 of the race, where he got the better of a group of five escapees in the sprint. Stannard was part of the Great Britain team that helped Mark Cavendish win the road race at the UCI Road World Championships, with a vital pull in the closing stages to keep Cavendish towards the front of the peloton. Stannard also featured in a 14-rider lead group at the end of season Paris–Tours race, finishing fourth. One of the hardest working domestiques in the peloton, Stannard rode a total of 14,713 kilometres (9,142 miles) during 93 race days in 2011.

==== 2012 ====
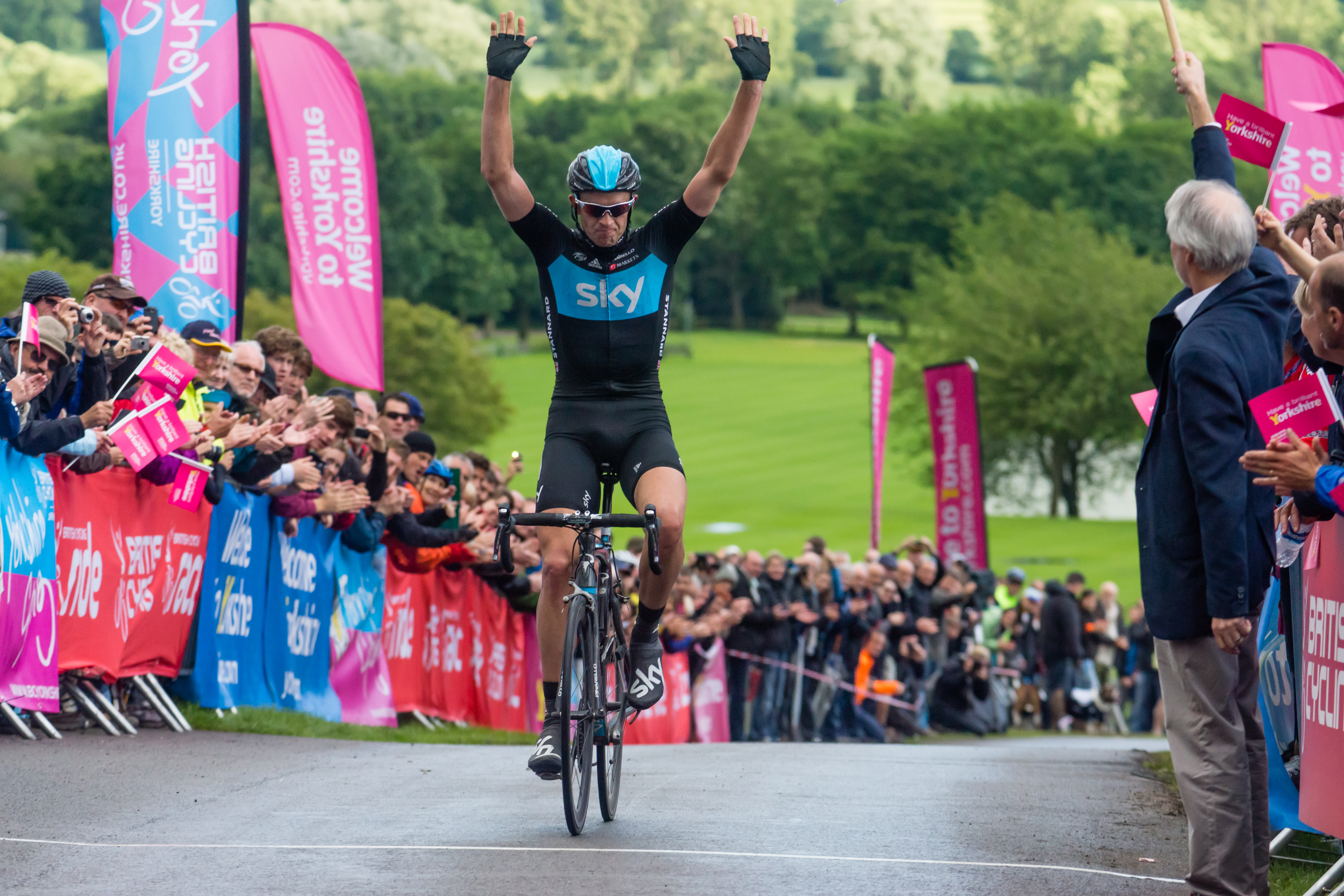
In 2012, Stannard was the winner of the British National Road Race Championships.

In 2012, Stannard won the London Nocturne by lapping the field. He also won the British National Road Race Championships, winning ahead of Sky teammate Alex Dowsett. Stannard was selected as part of the Great Britain team for the Olympic road race, alongside David Millar, Chris Froome, Bradley Wiggins and Mark Cavendish. With the team aiming to lead Cavendish to a sprint victory on The Mall, and despite the best efforts of Stannard, Team GB were unable to pull back a large breakaway group on the run in to London, with the gold medal going to Alexander Vinokourov. Stannard again represented Britain at the UCI World Road Race Championships and was active in a breakaway with Andrew Talansky on the penultimate lap, eventually finishing in the main group.

==== 2013 ====
In freezing conditions at March's Milan–San Remo, Stannard initially rode at the front of the race in support of Geraint Thomas, but attacked with Sylvain Chavanel after Thomas crashed. Stannard led over the Poggio di San Remo, only to be caught on the descent by a chase group of five riders. Stannard made a final move in the final 2 kilometres (1.2 miles) but was chased down by Peter Sagan, and he finished sixth in the sprint. He took top-ten overall finishes at Dwars door Vlaanderen and the Bayern Rundfahrt, finishing ninth and eighth respectively, before taking a second-place finish at the British National Road Race Championships in Glasgow, being outsprinted by Mark Cavendish at the finish. Stannard was selected to ride the Tour de France for the first time, and played a key role as a domestique for Chris Froome, who went on to win the race overall. Following the Tour de France, Stannard took two second-place stage finishes at the Eneco Tour, and the Tour of Britain – the latter result coming in an individual time trial – with a seventh-place overall finish in the Tour of Britain.

==== 2014 ====
Stannard began 2014 in good form, finishing fourth overall in the Tour of Qatar in February. Stannard won Omloop Het Nieuwsblad – the opening race of the Flanders Classics – after he out-sprinted his breakaway companion Greg Van Avermaet, thereby becoming the first British rider to win the race. In Gent–Wevelgem, Stannard crashed heavily into a roadside ditch and was taken to hospital. He was diagnosed with fractured vertebrae, ruling him out of the rest of the classics season. Stannard made his comeback to the road, riding for the English team in the men's road race event at the Commonwealth Games in Glasgow. A clearly uncomfortable Stannard withdrew early on in the race, which took place in treacherous rainy conditions – only 12 riders finished out of 140 starters – and which was eventually won by his Team Sky teammate Geraint Thomas. Stannard attempted another comeback, riding for Team Sky in the RideLondon–Surrey Classic. Stannard was noted for his hard work in successfully placing teammate Ben Swift in the eventually victorious breakaway group. Stannard was selected to ride the Tour of Britain, but broke his wrist in a crash on the first stage, putting an end to an injury plagued season.

==== 2015 ====
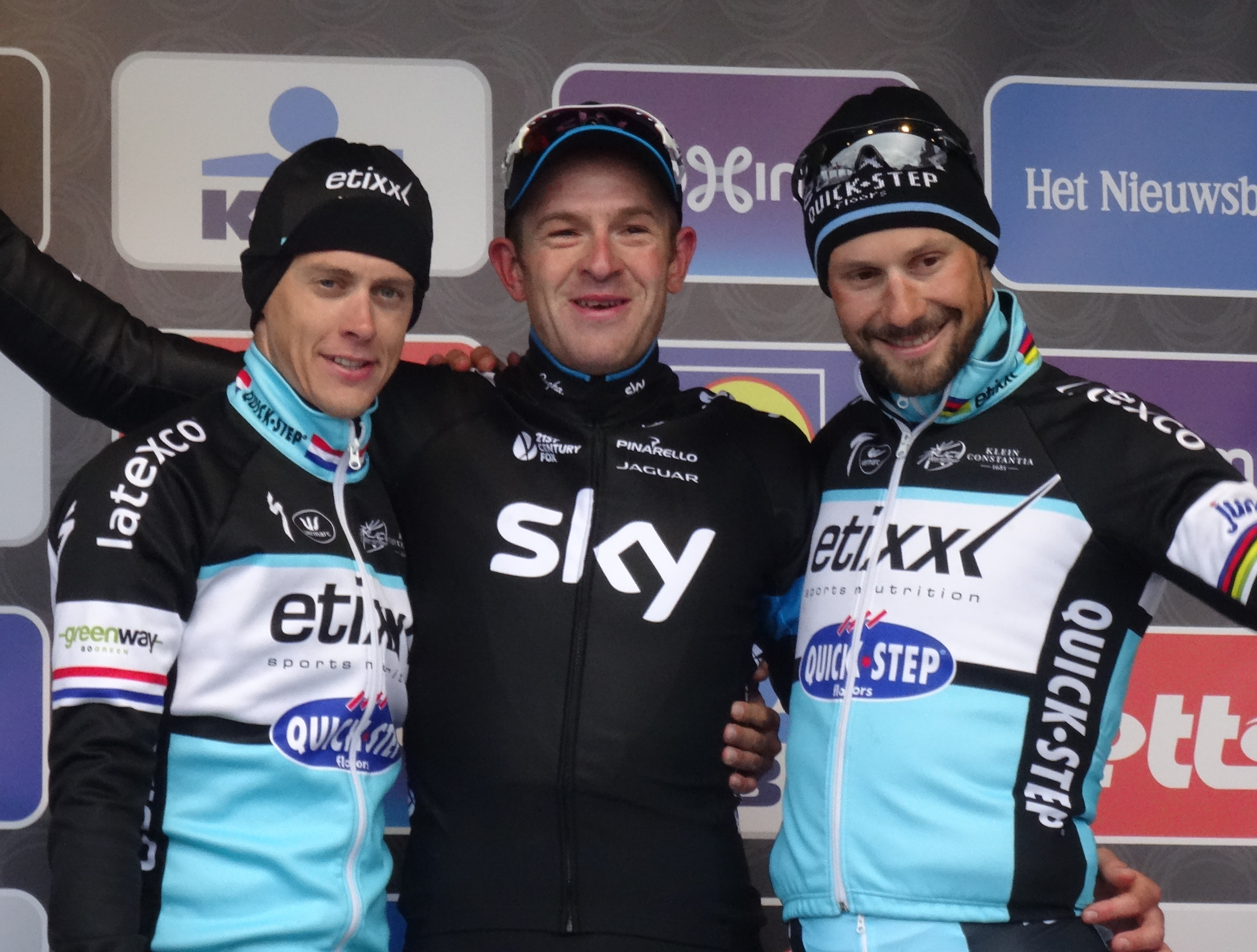
Stannard on the podium at the 2015 Omloop Het Nieuwsblad, where he defeated Etixx–Quick-Step teammates Niki Terpstra (left) and Tom Boonen (right)

Stannard recovered from his injuries for the start of the 2015 season, again placing fourth in February's Tour of Qatar. At the end of the month, Stannard won Omloop Het Nieuwsblad, defending his 2014 title – the first time a male rider had won consecutive editions since Peter Van Petegem in 1997 and 1998. He defeated Niki Terpstra in a two-man sprint, after spending the final 40 kilometres (25 miles) in a four-man group with a Etixx–Quick-Step triumvirate of Terpstra, Tom Boonen and Stijn Vandenbergh. He also fended off attacks by Boonen and Terpstra in the closing stages of the race. He was also part of the Team Sky selection that won the team time trial at the Tour de Romandie, and he finished third in the British National Road Race Championships.

==== 2016 ====
In an interview in January, Stannard confirmed that he would not compete in Omloop Het Nieuwsblad or Kuurne–Brussels–Kuurne – having previously appeared in the opening double header of the Belgian classics season every year since 2009 and forgoing the opportunity to win the Omloop for the third year running – in order to focus on peaking for the Flemish Cycling Week. He also explained that his preparation for the spring classics would include debut appearances at the Volta ao Algarve and Paris–Nice. Stannard finished third at E3 Harelbeke, leading a small group across the line behind his victorious teammate Michał Kwiatkowski and Peter Sagan, who had broken away from the group earlier. He also finished on the podium at Paris–Roubaix, where he finished third in a sprint from a five-man group which had formed when Stannard animated the race with an attack on the cobbled section at Camphin-en-Pévèle. Stannard was part of the Tour de France-winning team, regarded as Sky's key domestique on flat stages, and he ultimately took a victory at September's Tour of Britain, following a 40-kilometre (25-mile) solo attack on the third stage.

==== Post-2016 ====
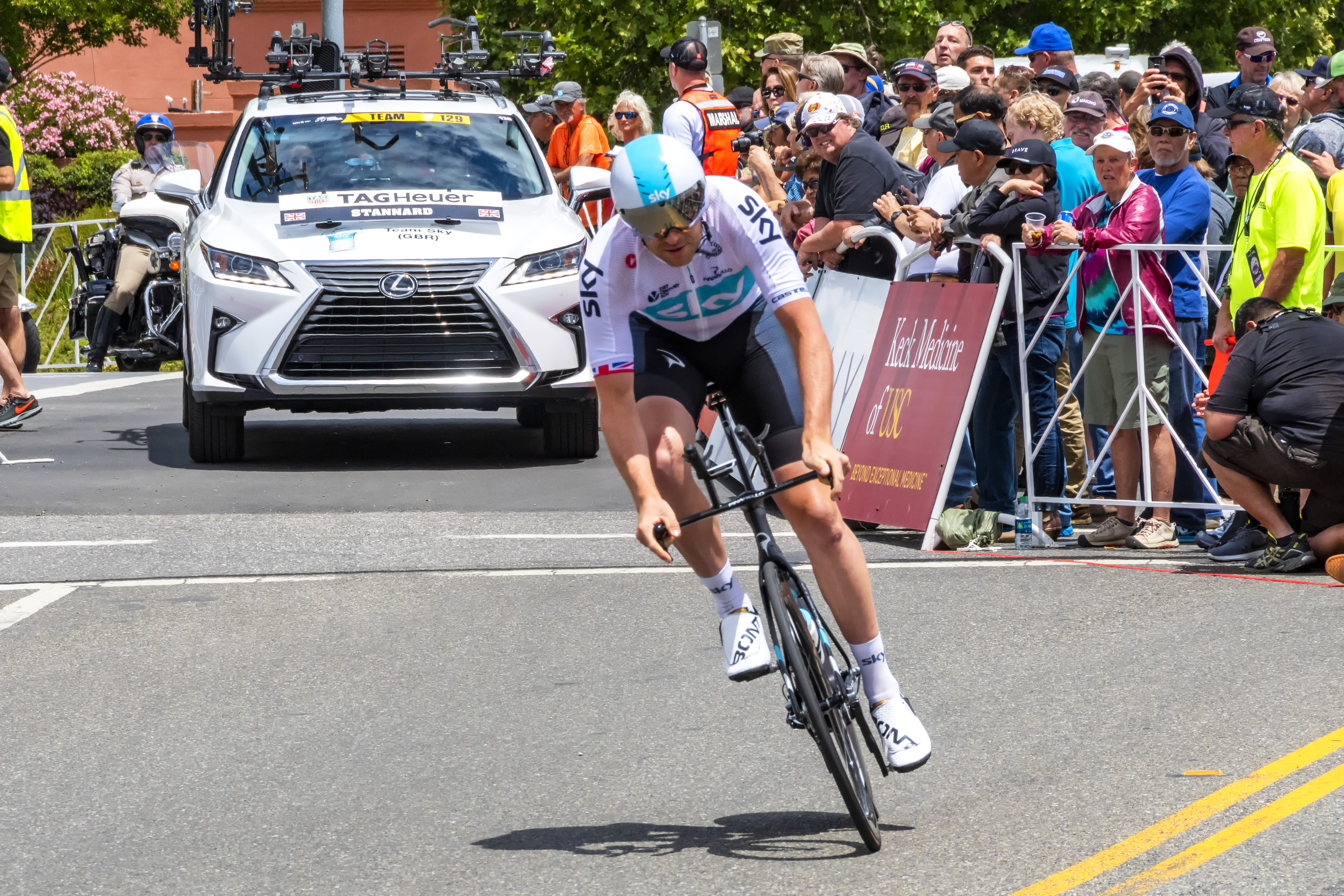
Stannard at the 2018 Tour of California

Stannard started his 2017 season with a block of racing in Australia, which culminated in a stage victory on the final day of the Herald Sun Tour, attacking inside the final kilometre. Having signed a three-year contract extension earlier in the season, Stannard also played a part as a domestique in the Vuelta a España success for Chris Froome and Team Sky. In 2018, Stannard took a second career stage victory at the Tour of Britain, when he won the penultimate stage of the race from a solo move at around 16 kilometres (9.9 miles) remaining. He recorded his first podium finish at the British National Road Race Championships since 2015 in 2019, when he finished second behind teammate Ben Swift, having "softened up the others" for Swift.

=== Retirement, directeur sportif ===
Following the COVID-19 pandemic-effected 2020 season, Stannard announced his retirement from competition that November after being diagnosed with rheumatoid arthritis. In February 2021, Stannard joined UCI Continental team Trinity Racing as a directeur sportif, remaining with the team until the end of the 2022 season, when he joined his former team – since renamed as the INEOS Grenadiers – in a similar role.

== Major results ==
=== Road ===
2004
1st Time trial, Commonwealth Youth Games
National Junior Championships

1st Time trial
3rd Road race

2nd Paris–Roubaix Juniors
2005
1st Overall Tour du Pays de Vaud

1st Stage 3 (ITT)

2007
1st Clayton Velo Spring Classic
1st Eddie Soens
1st Milano–Busseto
4th Overall Thüringen Rundfahrt der U23
2008
3rd Overall Tour of Britain
2009
1st Stage 1b (TTT) Settimana Internazionale di Coppi e Bartali
2010
1st Stage 1 (TTT) Tour of Qatar
3rd Road race, National Championships
3rd Kuurne–Brussels–Kuurne
2011 (1 pro win)
1st Stage 5 Tour of Austria
4th Road race, National Championships
4th Paris–Tours
2012 (1)
1st Road race, National Championships
1st London Nocturne
2013
2nd Road race, National Championships
6th Milan–San Remo
7th Overall Tour of Britain
8th Overall Bayern Rundfahrt
9th Dwars door Vlaanderen
2014 (1)
1st Omloop Het Nieuwsblad
4th Overall Tour of Qatar
2015 (1)
1st Omloop Het Nieuwsblad
1st Stage 1 (TTT) Tour de Romandie
3rd Road race, National Championships
4th Overall Tour of Qatar
2016 (1)
1st Stage 3 Tour of Britain
3rd E3 Harelbeke
3rd Paris–Roubaix
2017 (1)
1st Stage 4 Herald Sun Tour
2018 (1)
1st Stage 7 Tour of Britain
2019
2nd Road race, National Championships

==== Grand Tour general classification results timeline ====
Grand Tour	2009	2010	2011	2012	2013	2014	2015	2016	2017	2018	2019
Giro d'Italia	160	—	—	132	—	—	—	—	—	—	—
Tour de France	—	—	—	—	135	—	128	161	—	—	—
/ Vuelta a España	—	DNF	128	111	—	—	—	—	148	—	106

==== Classics results timeline ====
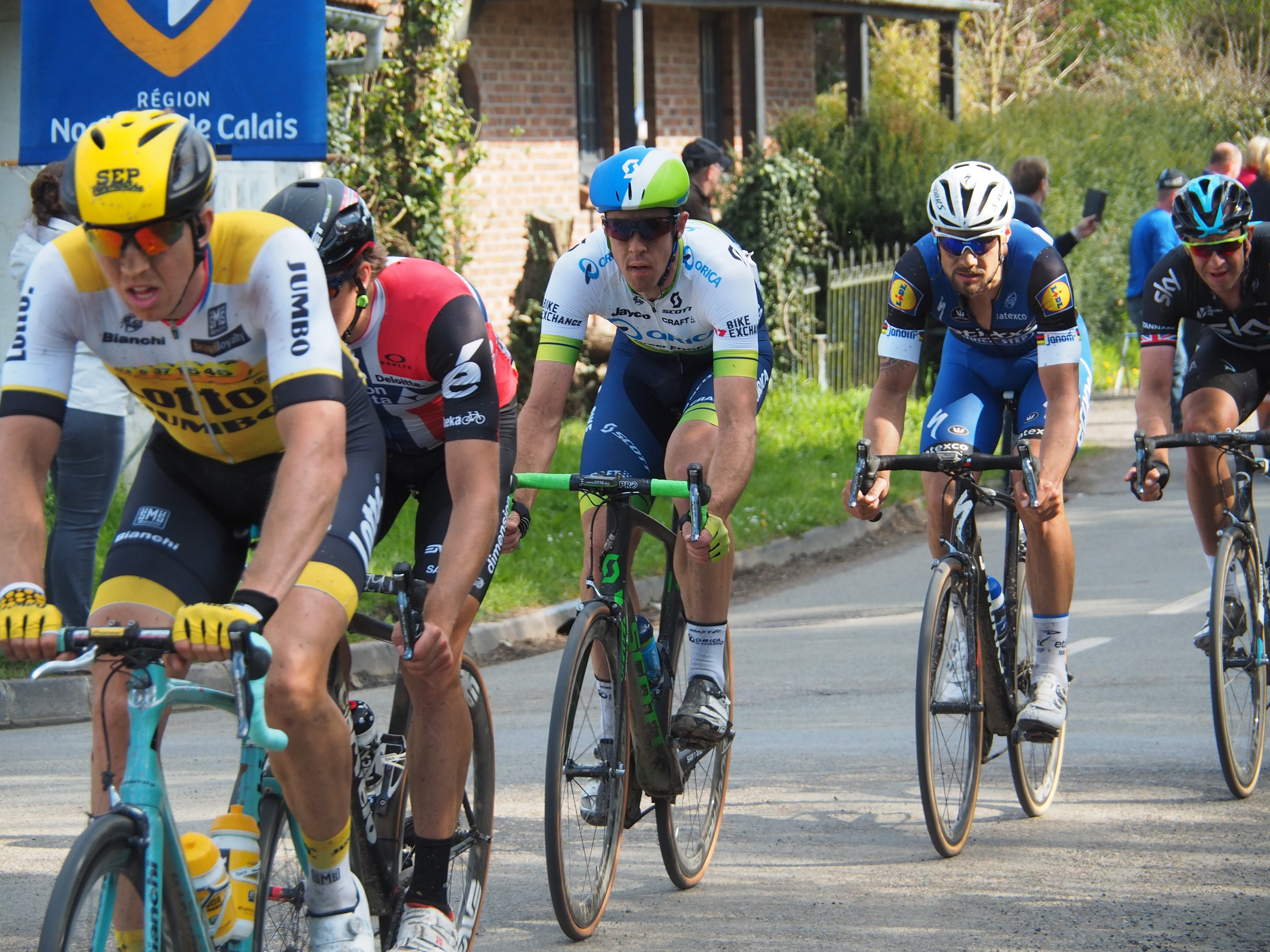
Stannard (far right) recorded his best cycling monument result at the 2016 Paris–Roubaix, where he finished in third place

Monument	2008	2009	2010	2011	2012	2013	2014	2015	2016	2017	2018	2019	2020
Milan–San Remo	—	DNF	DNF	102	DNF	6	—	DNF	57	92	127	—	—
Tour of Flanders	72	—	83	50	57	103	—	57	32	64	DNF	76	—
Paris–Roubaix	88	—	OTL	36	51	51	—	47	3	72	DNF	82	NH
Liège–Bastogne–Liège	Did not contest during his career												
Giro di Lombardia	Did not contest during his career												
Classic	2008	2009	2010	2011	2012	2013	2014	2015	2016	2017	2018	2019	2020
Omloop Het Nieuwsblad	—	142	103	27	26	34	1	1	—	78	—	26	49
Kuurne–Brussels–Kuurne	—	91	3	70	80	NH	44	67	—	14	—	45	62
E3 Harelbeke	—	—	47	—	48	23	DNF	26	3	56	—	90	NH
Gent–Wevelgem	161	—	—	35	70	43	DNF	DNF	—	21	90	74	—
Dwars door Vlaanderen	—	—	94	25	—	9	15	—	—	—	79	—	NH
Paris–Tours	—	—	—	4	—	—	—	—	140	—	—	—	—

Legend
—	Did not compete
DNF	Did not finish
OTL	Outside time limit
NH	Not held

=== Track ===
2004
Commonwealth Youth Games

3rd Individual pursuit
3rd Scratch

2005
1st Team pursuit, UEC European Junior Championships
1st Points race, National Junior Championships
2nd Team pursuit, UCI World Junior Championships
2006
1st Team pursuit, UEC European Championships
1st UIV Cup, Stuttgart (with Andy Tennant)
National Championships

2nd Team pursuit
3rd Scratch

3rd Team pursuit, UCI World Cup Classics, Sydney
