= 2015 Tour of Qatar =

UCI Asia Tour
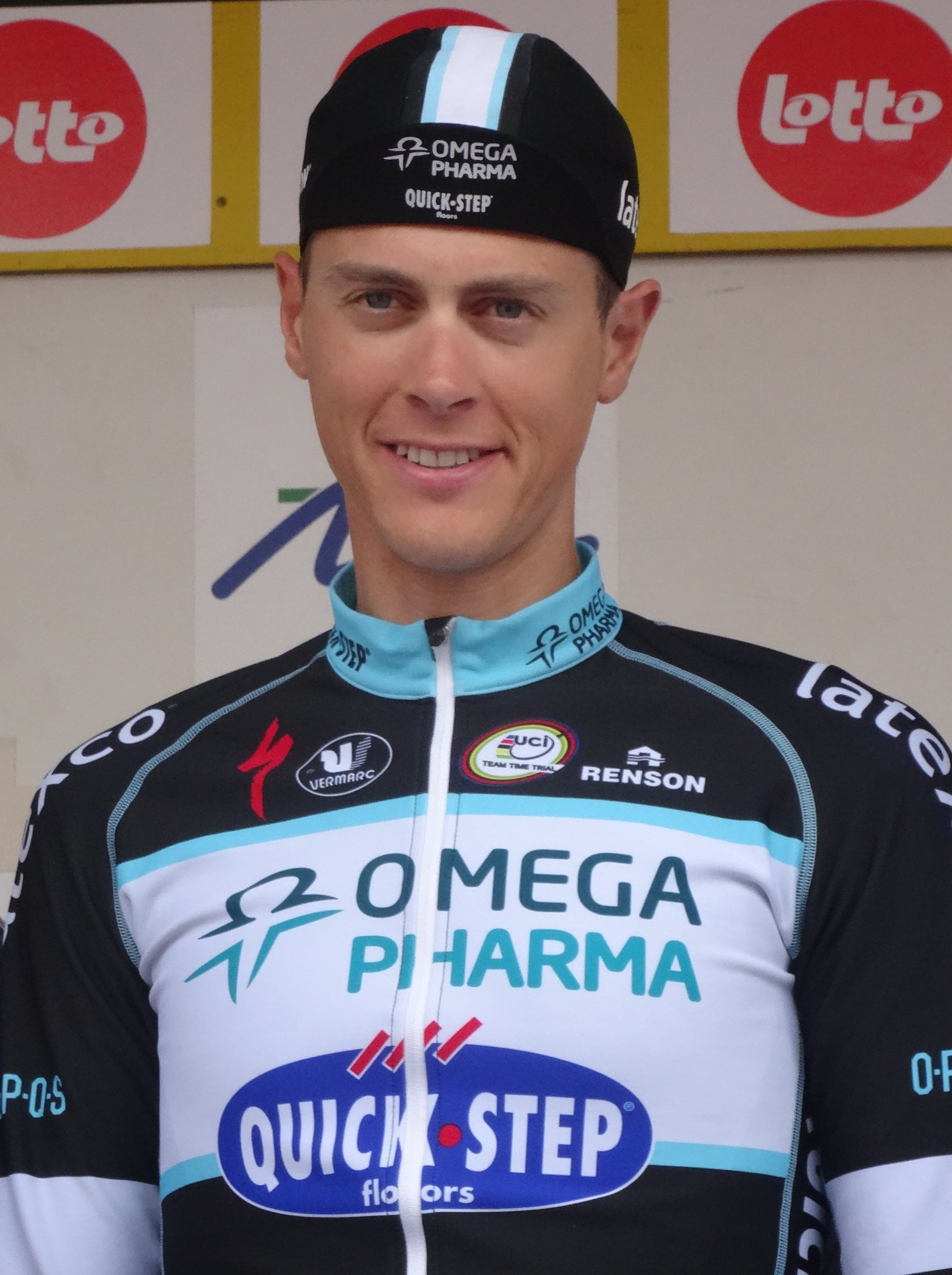
- Niki Terpstra, the winner of the 2015 Tour of Qatar

Race details
- Dates: 8–13 February 2015
- Stages: 6
- Distance: 784.4 km (487.4 mi)
- Winning time: 17h 36' 48"

Results
| Jersey awarded to the overall winner | Winner | Niki Terpstra (NED) | (Etixx–Quick-Step) |
| | Second | Maciej Bodnar (POL) | (Tinkoff–Saxo) |
| | Third | Alexander Kristoff (NOR) | (Team Katusha) |
| Jersey awarded to the points classification winner | Points | Alexander Kristoff (NOR) | (Team Katusha) |
| Jersey awarded to the young rider classification winner | Young rider | Peter Sagan (SVK) | (Tinkoff–Saxo) |
| | Team | Etixx–Quick-Step | |

The 2015 Tour of Qatar was the 14th edition of the Tour of Qatar cycling stage race. It was organised by the Amaury Sport Organisation (ASO), the organisers of the Tour de France. The race was rated as a 2.HC event, the second highest rating an event can receive, and was part of the 2015 UCI Asia Tour.

The 2015 race consisted of six stages. It started in Dukhan on 8 February 2015 and finished on 13 February in Doha, the capital city of Qatar. The Tour of Qatar puts unusual demands on riders: it has no significant climbs, but almost every stage is affected by strong crosswinds. These conditions make the race ideal preparation for the spring classics season, so many prominent classics riders were present. The flat stages, suitable for sprinters, and individual time trial meant that specialists in these disciplines also chose to ride in Qatar.

The race was won by Dutch rider Niki Terpstra of Etixx–Quick-Step. It was the second successive year that Terpstra won the race after his victory in 2014; it was the fourth successive victory for Etixx–Quick-Step and eighth overall in Qatar. Terpstra took the lead of the race with victory in the third stage of the race, the individual time trial, and held the lead of the race to the finish. Maciej Bodnar (Tinkoff–Saxo) took second place, six seconds behind Terpstra; Alexander Kristoff won stages 2, 4 and 5 on the way to finishing third, nine seconds off the overall lead.

In the race's other classifications, Kristoff won the silver jersey of the points classification, thanks to his three stage wins. Peter Sagan (Tinkoff–Saxo) was the winner of the pearl white jersey of the young rider classification as he was the highest placed rider born after 1 January 1990. The team classification was won by Etixx–Quick-Step.

== Preview ==
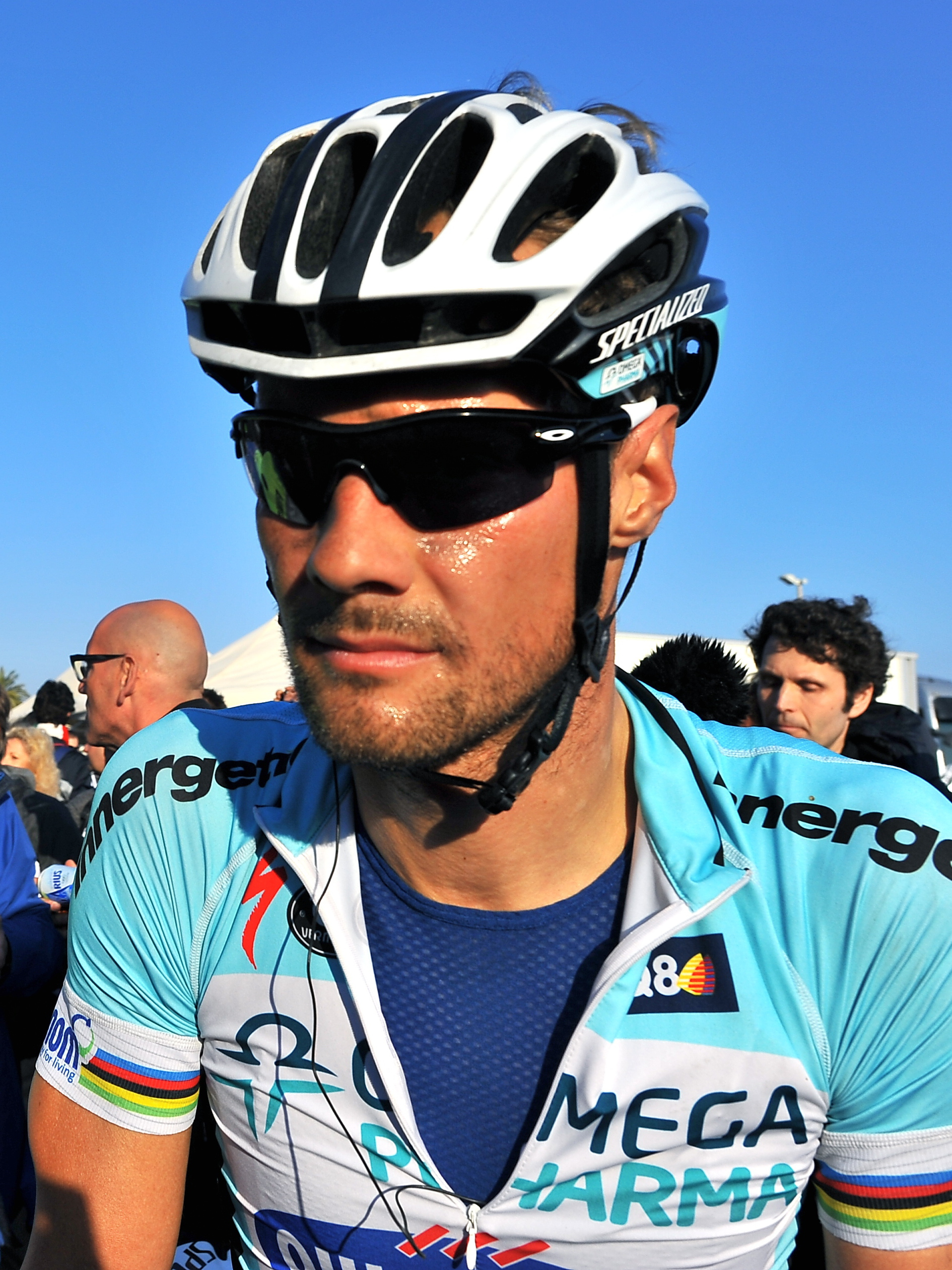
Tom Boonen, four times the overall victor at the Tour of Qatar

The Tour of Qatar was one of the early races in the season, coming in the middle of three races in the Middle East (alongside the Dubai Tour and the Tour of Oman) that saw high levels of participation from the top European teams. The race was particularly popular as a preparation race for riders aiming for the spring classics. The significant challenge in the Tour of Qatar was the strong winds across the desert, which frequently caused the peloton to split into echelons. As well as attracting the top classics riders, the flat nature of the course meant many stages could be won by sprinters; the individual time trial also attracted many of the time trial specialists, who had a chance of overall victory.

Etixx–Quick-Step had dominated the race since it began. This included winning the last three editions (with Tom Boonen, Mark Cavendish and Niki Terpstra). Boonen had won the overall race on four previous occasions, as well as winning 22 stages. Boonen and Terpstra were both among the favourites for the overall victory, along with world time-trial champion Bradley Wiggins (Team Sky).

Marcel Kittel (Team Giant–Alpecin) was the most prominent sprinter to travel to Qatar, alongside Peter Sagan (Tinkoff–Saxo), Alexander Kristoff (Team Katusha), and several others.

== Teams ==
18 teams were selected to take part in the event, including 13 UCI WorldTeams. Each team was permitted to include between five and eight riders. 15 teams had the full allowance of eight riders; 3 teams had seven-man teams. The race therefore began with 141 riders. 9 of these withdrew during the course of the event; 132 finished the final stage.

UCI World Teams

- Astana
- BMC Racing Team
- Etixx–Quick-Step
- FDJ
- IAM Cycling
- Lampre–Merida
- Movistar Team
- Orica–GreenEDGE
- Team Giant–Alpecin
- Team Katusha
- Team Sky
- Tinkoff–Saxo
- Trek Factory Racing

UCI Professional Continental teams

- Bardiani–CSF
- Bora–Argon 18
- Cofidis
- MTN–Qhubeka
- Topsport Vlaanderen–Baloise

== Route ==
The 2015 event had a very similar format to the previous year's race. It consisted of six stages, of which five were flat stages and one was an individual time trial. The individual time trial, on the third day of racing, used precisely the same course as the corresponding stage in 2014.

List of stages
| Stage | Date | Course | Type | Distance | Winner |
|---|---|---|---|---|---|
| 1 | 8 February | Dukhan to Sealine Beach | Flat stage | 136 km (85 mi) | José Joaquín Rojas (ESP) |
| 2 | 9 February | Al Wakrah to Al Khor Corniche | Flat stage | 194.5 km (121 mi) | Alexander Kristoff (NOR) |
| 3 | 10 February | Lusail to Lusail | Individual time trial | 10.9 km (7 mi) | Niki Terpstra (NED) |
| 4 | 11 February | Al Thakhira to Mesaieed | Flat stage | 165.5 km (103 mi) | Alexander Kristoff (NOR) |
| 5 | 12 February | Al Zubara Fort to Madinat ash Shamal | Flat stage | 153 km (95 mi) | Alexander Kristoff (NOR) |
| 6 | 13 February | Sealine Beach Resort to Doha Corniche | Flat stage | 124.5 km (77 mi) | Sam Bennett (IRL) |

== Stages ==
=== Stage 1 ===
8 February 2015 — Dukhan to Sealine Beach, 136 km (85 mi)

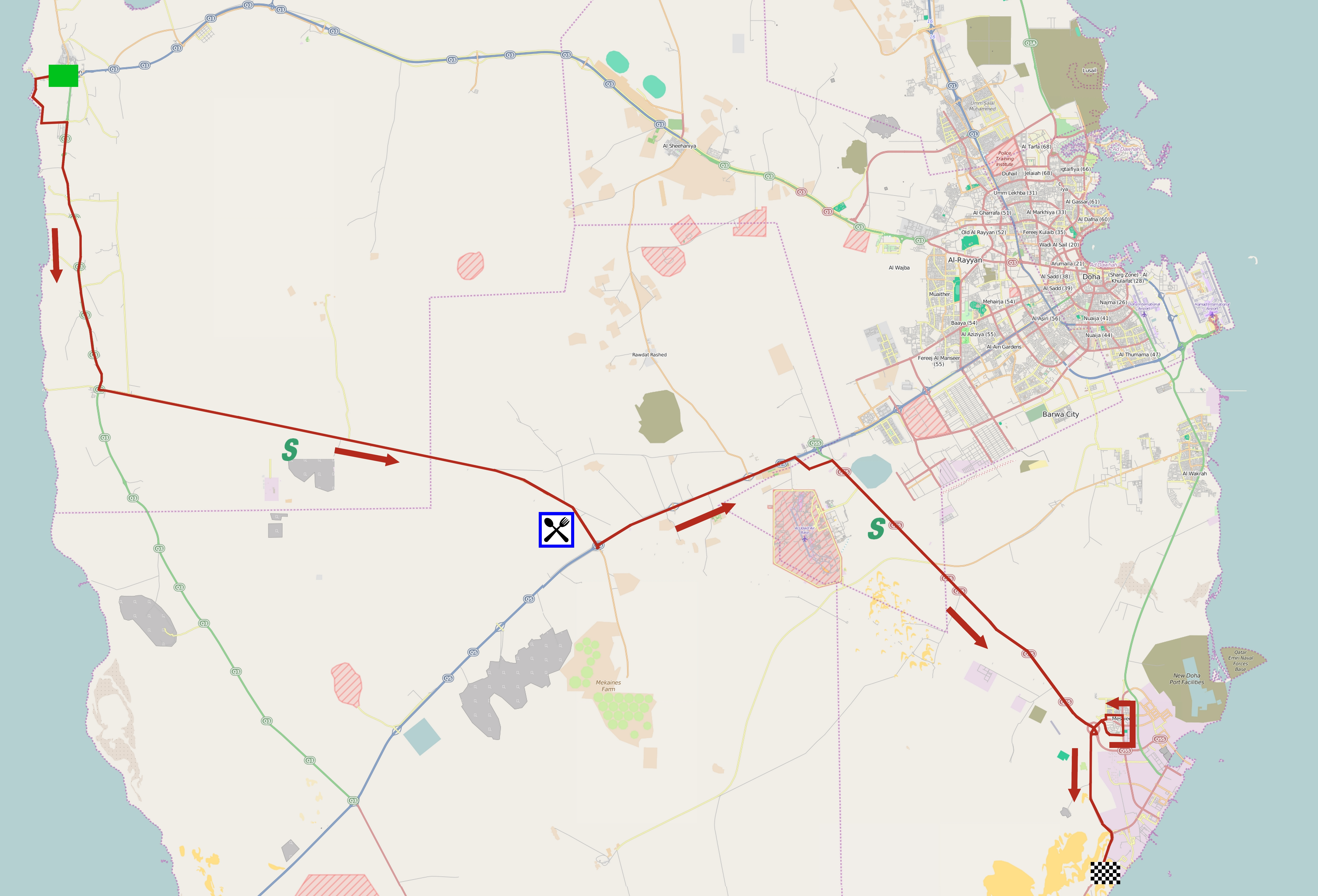
Stage 1 route

The race began with a 136 km (85 mi) route from Dukhan in the west of Qatar to the Sealine Beach Resort, Mesaieed. The route was flat and, as normal in the Tour of Qatar, the principal difficulty was caused by crosswinds.

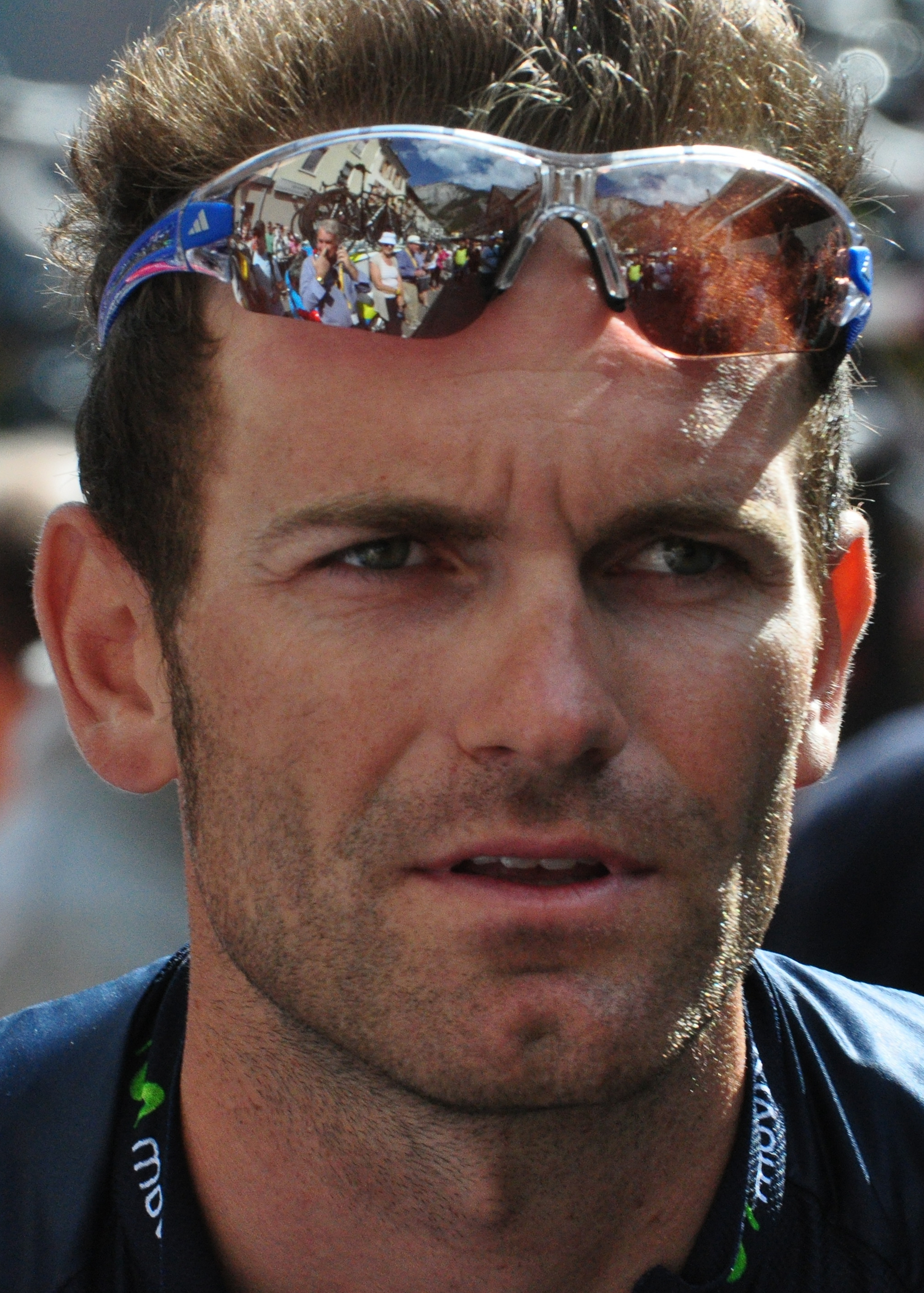
José Joaquín Rojas (pictured here in 2013) won stage 1

The initial breakaway was formed early in the race by Luca Sterbini (Bardiani–CSF) and Jarl Salomein (Topsport Vlaanderen–Baloise). They built a lead that reached seven minutes by the half-way point. Midway through the stage, a change in direction meant the peloton was now racing in crosswinds, and Etixx–Quick-Step along with Trek Factory Racing attacked. They formed echelons and split the peloton. Riders such as Bradley Wiggins (Team Sky), Nacer Bouhanni (Cofidis) and Alejandro Valverde (Movistar Team) were left adrift from the front group, but another turn into a headwind meant the groups could come back together.

Shortly before the second intermediate sprint, Tom Boonen (Etixx–Quick-Step) and Peter Sagan (Tinkoff–Saxo) were involved in a crash, but were both able to remount and rejoin the peloton. After Nikias Arndt (Team Giant–Alpecin) won that sprint, Greg Van Avermaet made a short-lived attack before a more determined effort from Lars Boom and Lieuwe Westra (both Astana) and Matti Breschel (Tinkoff–Saxo). Though they achieved a lead of nearly a minute, the attack was ultimately unsuccessful, due to crosswinds and a combination of Etixx–Quick-Step, Trek Factory Racing and Bora–Argon 18 riding at a high tempo.

In the final 10 km (6 mi), the peloton split again. The main field was reduced to 51 riders, with Marcel Kittel (Team Giant–Alpecin), Wiggins, Edvald Boasson Hagen (MTN–Qhubeka), Luca Paolini (Team Katusha) and Filippo Pozzato (Lampre–Merida) among the notable riders to lose time.

In the final kilometre, José Joaquín Rojas (Movistar Team) attached himself to the back of the Etixx–Quick-Step leadout train. He opened his sprint with 300 m (1,000 ft) remaining, taking other riders by surprise, and was able to hold them off and take the victory. This was Rojas' first victory since the 2014 Vuelta a Castilla y León. Boonen finished second in the sprint, with Arnaud Démare (FDJ) third.

Stage 1 result
| Rank | Rider | Team | Time |
|---|---|---|---|
| 1 | José Joaquín Rojas (SPA) | Movistar Team | 3h 49' 50" |
| 2 | Tom Boonen (BEL) | Etixx–Quick-Step | + 0" |
| 3 | Arnaud Démare (FRA) | FDJ | + 0" |
| 4 | Peter Sagan (SVK) | Tinkoff–Saxo | + 0" |
| 5 | Sam Bennett (IRE) | Bora–Argon 18 | + 0" |
| 6 | Jasper Stuyven (BEL) | Trek Factory Racing | + 0" |
| 7 | Heinrich Haussler (AUS) | IAM Cycling | + 0" |
| 8 | Andrea Guardini (ITA) | Astana | + 0" |
| 9 | Alexander Kristoff (NOR) | Team Katusha | + 0" |
| 10 | Nacer Bouhanni (FRA) | Cofidis | + 0" |

General classification after stage 1
| Rank | Rider | Team | Time |
|---|---|---|---|
| 1 | José Joaquín Rojas (SPA) | Movistar Team | 3h 49' 40" |
| 2 | Tom Boonen (BEL) | Etixx–Quick-Step | + 4" |
| 3 | Arnaud Démare (FRA) | FDJ | + 6" |
| 4 | Niki Terpstra (NED) | Etixx–Quick-Step | + 8" |
| 5 | Roberto Ferrari (ITA) | Lampre–Merida | + 9" |
| 6 | Peter Sagan (SVK) | Tinkoff–Saxo | + 10" |
| 7 | Sam Bennett (IRE) | Bora–Argon 18 | + 10" |
| 8 | Jasper Stuyven (BEL) | Trek Factory Racing | + 10" |
| 9 | Heinrich Haussler (AUS) | IAM Cycling | + 10" |
| 10 | Andrea Guardini (ITA) | Astana | + 10" |

=== Stage 2 ===
9 February 2015 — Al Wakrah to Al Khor Corniche, 194.5 km (121 mi)

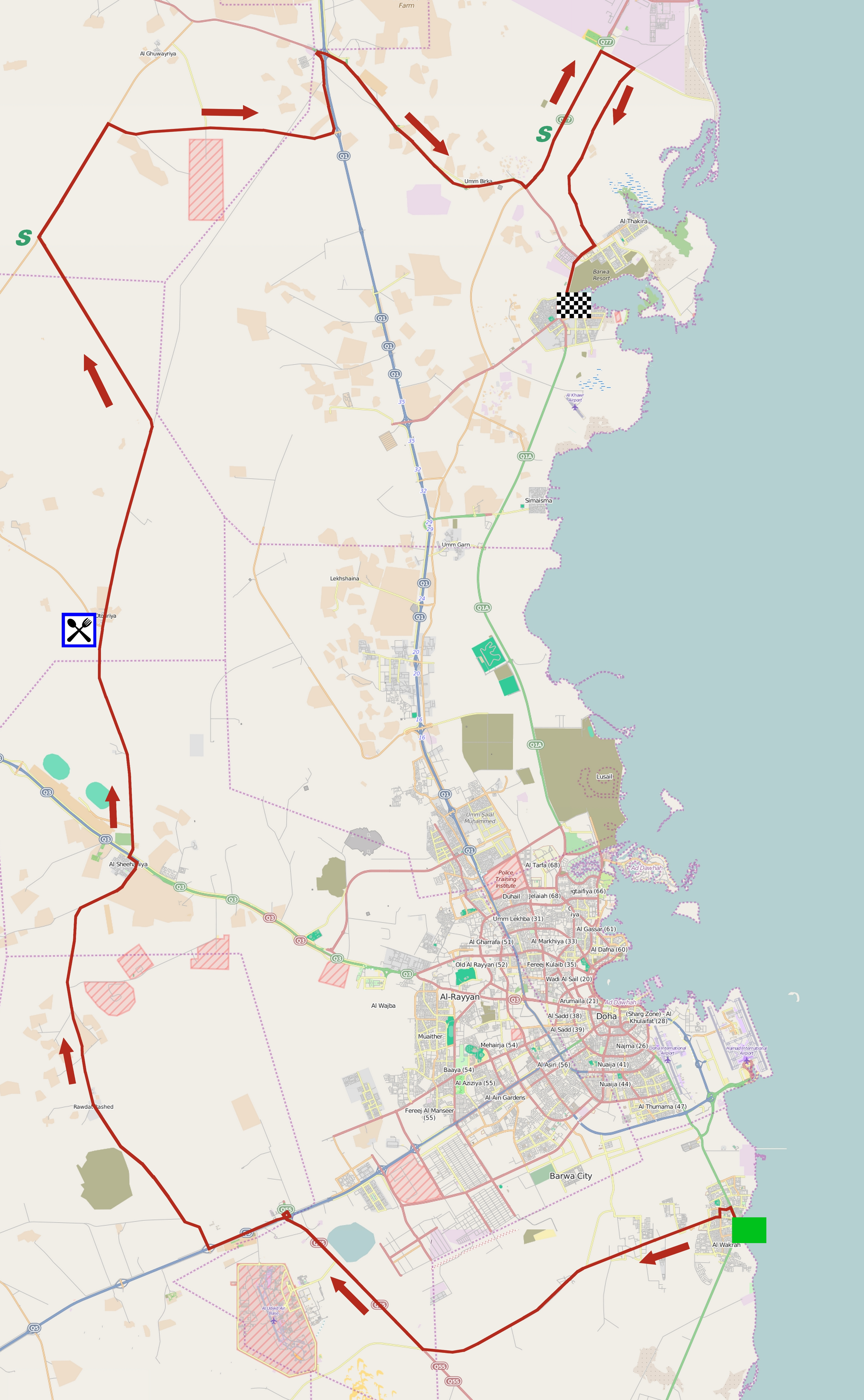
Stage 2 route

The second stage took the riders 187.5 km (117 mi) from Al Wakrah, south of Doha, to Al Khor Corniche.

Early in the stage, Etixx–Quick-Step launched an attack, quickly splitting the pack in crosswinds to create a lead group of 30 riders. Riders left behind included the race leader, José Joaquín Rojas (Movistar Team), Bradley Wiggins (Team Sky), Marcel Kittel (Team Giant–Alpecin) and Lars Boom (Astana). The lead group, however, failed to establish a lead of more than half a minute and work from BMC Racing Team and MTN–Qhubeka brought the field back together after 60 km (37 mi), when the wind changed to a tailwind.

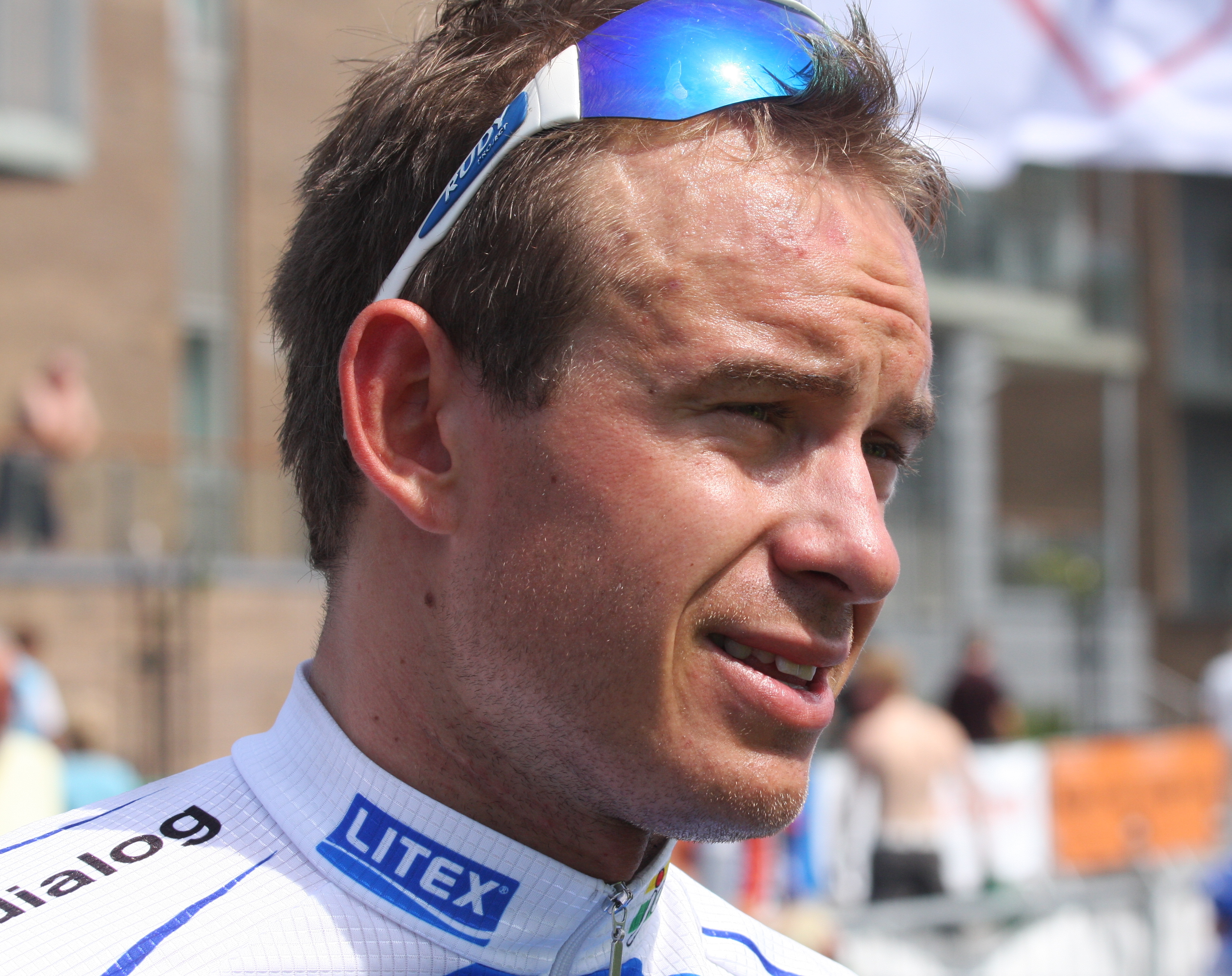
Alexander Kristoff (pictured here in 2009) won stages 2, 4 and 5

At this point a five-man breakaway formed, including Michael Mørkøv (Tinkoff–Saxo), Greg Van Avermaet (BMC Racing Team), Johann van Zyl (MTN–Qhubeka), Jelle Wallays (Topsport Vlaanderen–Baloise), and Mathew Hayman (Orica–GreenEDGE), establishing a lead of nearly four minutes. At the next change of direction, Etixx–Quick-Step again attacked in the crosswinds. The breakaway was caught after 124 km (77 mi), with the peloton again splitting. Wiggins, Kittel and Fabian Cancellara (Trek Factory Racing) had all been dropped. Soon afterwards, further attacks from Etixx–Quick-Step removed Rojas and Arnaud Démare (FDJ) from the leading group. Tom Boonen won the second intermediate sprint, earning three bonus seconds. With 5 km (3 mi) remaining, the leading group was reduced to 15 riders. In the final kilometre, Andrea Guardini and Niki Terpstra had formed a small gap, but Alexander Kristoff bridged up to the pair and launched his sprint with 500 m (1,640 ft) remaining. Kristoff was able to win the stage ahead of Guardini, with Van Avermaet in third.

Due to the 10-second time bonus for winning the stage, Kristoff took over the overall lead of the race, one second ahead of Boonen, who moved into the lead of the points competition. Several riders who had been contenders for the overall victory, including Wiggins and Cancellara, finished over nine minutes behind Kristoff, eliminating them from contention for overall victory.

Stage 2 result
| Rank | Rider | Team | Time |
|---|---|---|---|
| 1 | Alexander Kristoff (NOR) | Team Katusha | 3h 49' 51" |
| 2 | Andrea Guardini (ITA) | Astana | + 0" |
| 3 | Greg Van Avermaet (BEL) | BMC Racing Team | + 0" |
| 4 | Peter Sagan (SVK) | Tinkoff–Saxo | + 0" |
| 5 | Tom Boonen (BEL) | Etixx–Quick-Step | + 0" |
| 6 | Heinrich Haussler (AUS) | IAM Cycling | + 0" |
| 7 | Adam Blythe (GBR) | Orica–GreenEDGE | + 0" |
| 8 | Marcus Burghardt (GER) | BMC Racing Team | + 0" |
| 9 | Jasper Stuyven (BEL) | Trek Factory Racing | + 0" |
| 10 | Ian Stannard (GBR) | Team Sky | + 0" |

General classification after stage 2
| Rank | Rider | Team | Time |
|---|---|---|---|
| 1 | Alexander Kristoff (NOR) | Team Katusha | 7h 39' 31" |
| 2 | Tom Boonen (BEL) | Etixx–Quick-Step | + 1" |
| 3 | Greg Van Avermaet (BEL) | BMC Racing Team | + 3" |
| 4 | Andrea Guardini (ITA) | Astana | + 4" |
| 5 | Niki Terpstra (NED) | Etixx–Quick-Step | + 8" |
| 6 | Marcus Burghardt (GER) | BMC Racing Team | + 9" |
| 7 | Peter Sagan (SVK) | Tinkoff–Saxo | + 10" |
| 8 | Heinrich Haussler (AUS) | IAM Cycling | + 10" |
| 9 | Jasper Stuyven (BEL) | Trek Factory Racing | + 10" |
| 10 | Maciej Bodnar (POL) | Tinkoff–Saxo | + 10" |

=== Stage 3 ===
10 February 2015 — Lusail to Lusail, 10.9 km (7 mi), individual time trial (ITT)

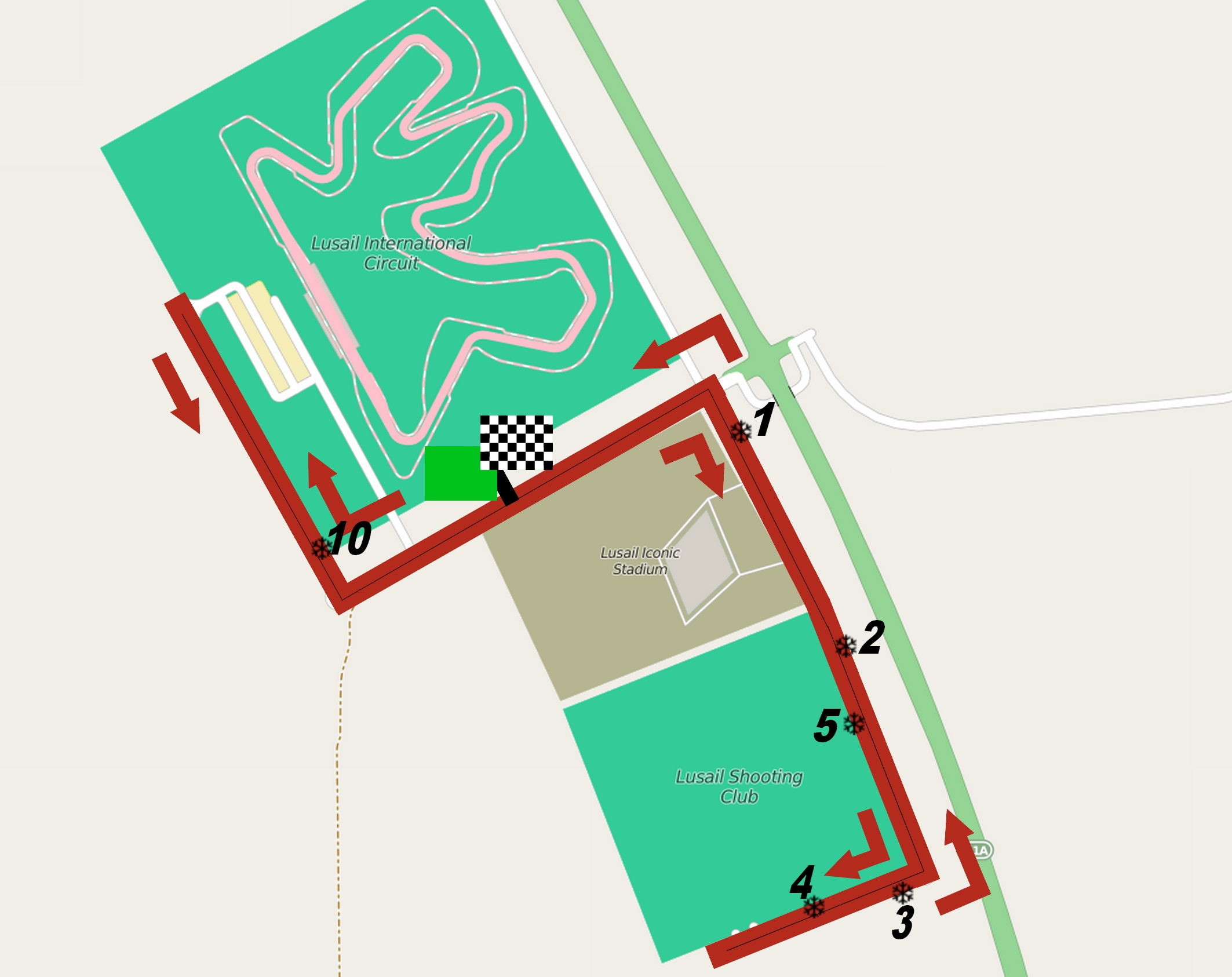
Stage 3 route

The third stage of the race was a 10.9 km (7 mi) individual time trial at Lusail. The course followed a route that went past the Lusail Iconic Stadium, Lusail Sports Arena and Losail International Circuit.

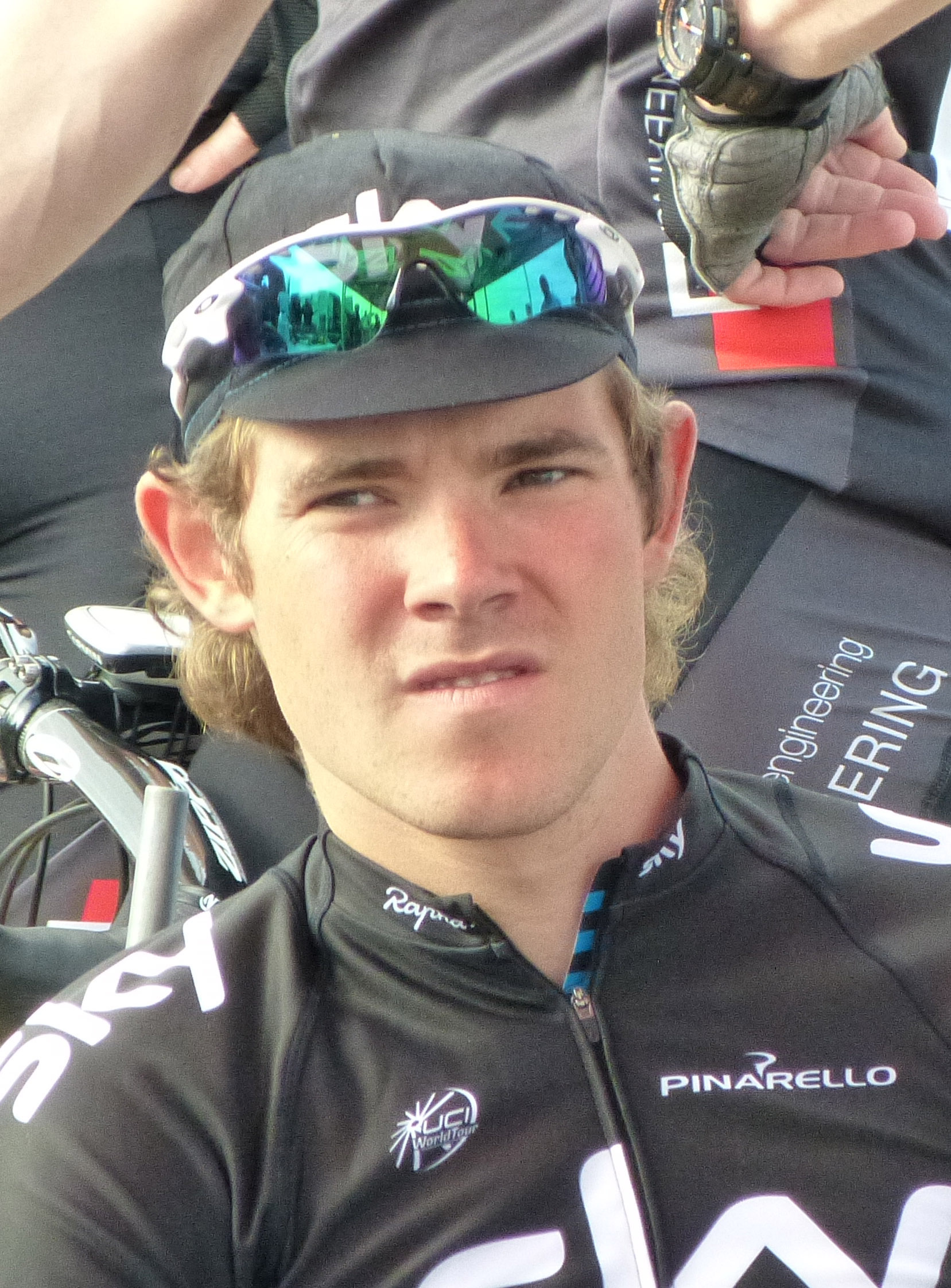
Luke Rowe (pictured here in 2013) moved into the lead of the young riders competition after stage 3

The riders were not allowed to use time trial bicycles as would normally be allowed in an individual time trial; conventional road bicycles were to be used instead. Favourites for the stage victory included current world champion Bradley Wiggins (Team Sky), four-time world champion Fabian Cancellara (Trek Factory Racing), Matthias Brändle (IAM Cycling) and Niki Terpstra (Etixx–Quick-Step). Wiggins was wearing the rainbow jersey of the world time-trial champion in a race for the first time and was riding a road bike with modifications for better aerodynamics.

The first fast time was set by Lars Boom, who took 14' 33" to complete the course, before Matthias Brändle took over the lead with a time of 14' 22". Wiggins briefly took the lead with a time of 14' 13", but soon afterwards Cancellara went one second faster. Terpstra, however, rode eight seconds quicker to win the stage and take over the gold jersey of overall leader.

The race leader after stage 2, Alexander Kristoff, finished 44 seconds behind Terpstra, 36 seconds off the overall lead. Other riders to lose significant time were Tom Boonen and Peter Sagan. Boonen retained his silver jersey, but Sagan lost his white jersey as leader of the young riders classification to Luke Rowe (Team Sky).

Stage 3 result
| Rank | Rider | Team | Time |
|---|---|---|---|
| 1 | Niki Terpstra (NED) | Etixx–Quick-Step | 14' 03" |
| 2 | Fabian Cancellara (SWI) | Trek Factory Racing | + 8" |
| 3 | Bradley Wiggins (GBR) | Team Sky | + 9" |
| 4 | Maciej Bodnar (POL) | Tinkoff–Saxo | + 9" |
| 5 | Ian Stannard (GBR) | Team Sky | + 10" |
| 6 | Matthias Brändle (AUT) | IAM Cycling | + 18" |
| 7 | Guillaume Van Keirsbulck (BEL) | Etixx–Quick-Step | + 20" |
| 8 | Edvald Boasson Hagen (NOR) | MTN–Qhubeka | + 21" |
| 9 | Greg Van Avermaet (BEL) | BMC Racing Team | + 24" |
| 10 | Reto Hollenstein (SWI) | IAM Cycling | + 25" |

General classification after stage 3
| Rank | Rider | Team | Time |
|---|---|---|---|
| 1 | Niki Terpstra (NED) | Etixx–Quick-Step | 7h 53' 42" |
| 2 | Maciej Bodnar (POL) | Tinkoff–Saxo | + 11" |
| 3 | Ian Stannard (GBR) | Team Sky | + 12" |
| 4 | Greg Van Avermaet (BEL) | BMC Racing Team | + 19" |
| 5 | Luke Rowe (GBR) | Team Sky | + 33" |
| 6 | Alexander Kristoff (NOR) | Team Katusha | + 36" |
| 7 | Tom Boonen (BEL) | Etixx–Quick-Step | + 42" |
| 8 | Heinrich Haussler (AUS) | IAM Cycling | + 44" |
| 9 | Andriy Hrivko (UKR) | Astana | + 46" |
| 10 | Peter Sagan (SVK) | Tinkoff–Saxo | + 48" |

=== Stage 4 ===
11 February 2015 — Al Thakhira to Mesaieed, 165.5 km (103 mi)

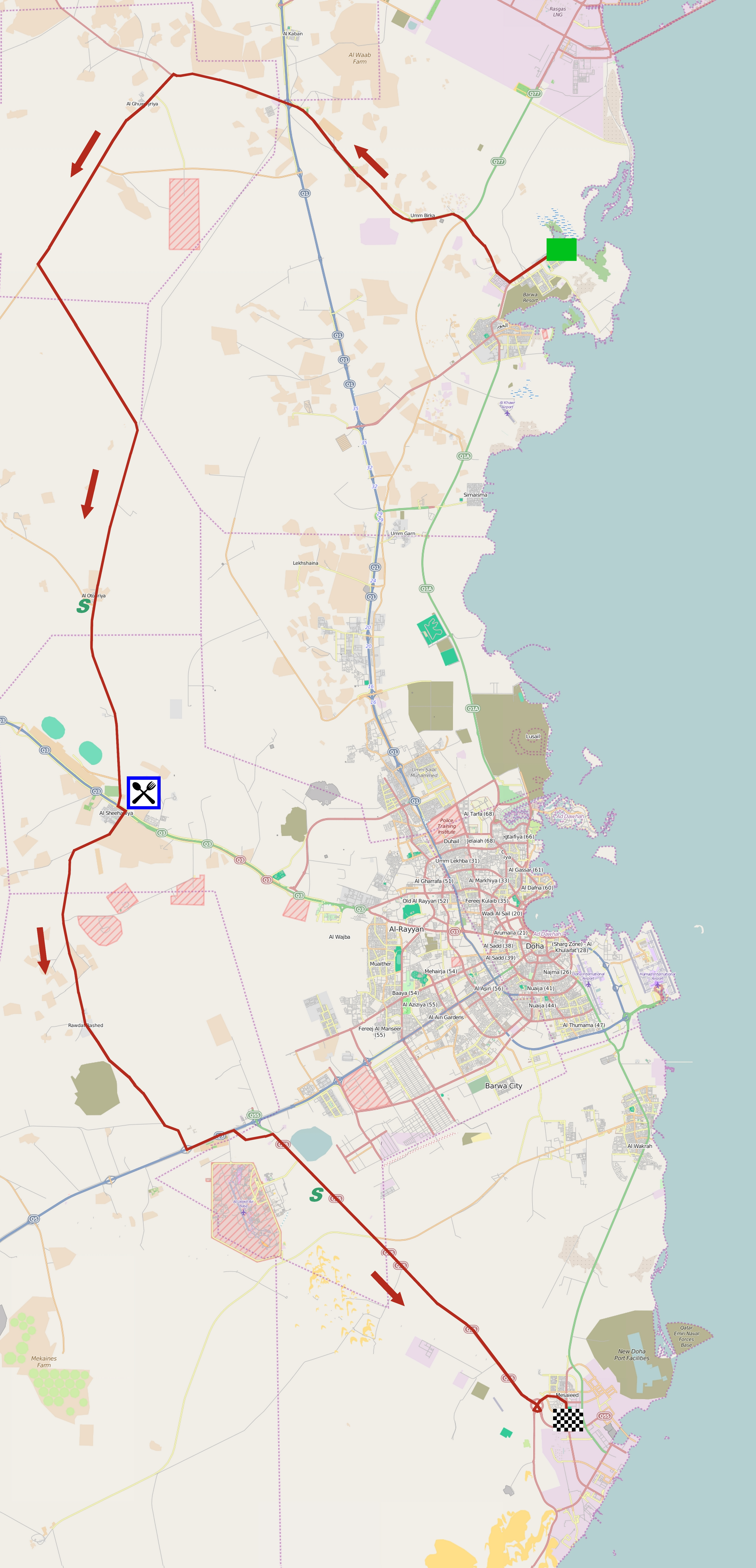
Stage 4 route

The fourth stage of the race was a 165.5 km (103 mi) route from Al Thakhira to the city of Mesaieed. With the wind generally coming from the south, the riders were riding into a headwind most of the day.

Due to the strong winds, the stage started 40 minutes before the scheduled time, as the race organisers were worried about the possibility of sandstorms and of slow racing leading to a late finish. Despite the headwind, three riders formed a breakaway. They were Jaco Venter (MTN–Qhubeka), Dmitriy Gruzdev (Astana), and Jarl Salomein (Topsport Vlaanderen–Baloise). The three riders built a lead that reached nearly four minutes.

Etixx–Quick-Step, riding for race leader Niki Terpstra, controlled the breakaway through most of the day. They were supported towards the end of the race by FDJ. Unlike the earlier road stages, the lack of crosswinds meant that there were no echelons or significant splits in the peloton. The breakaway was caught with 19 km (12 mi) remaining.

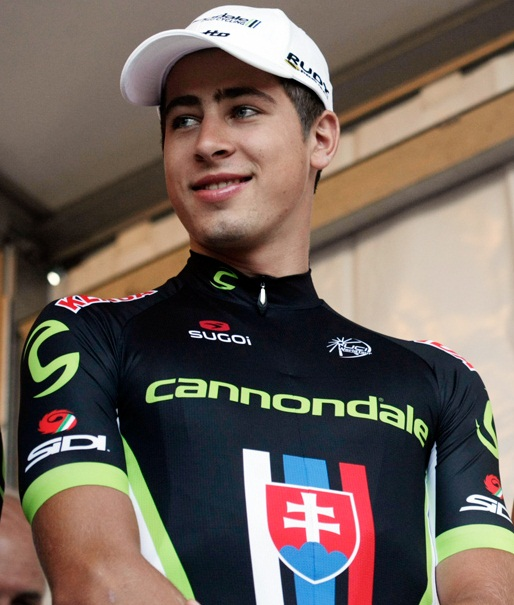
Peter Sagan (pictured here in 2013) was second in two stages and won the youth classification

In the final kilometres of the stage, several teams tried to ride at the front, including MTN–Qhubeka, Movistar Team, FDJ, Tinkoff–Saxo and Orica–GreenEDGE. The strong pace caused several riders to crash, including Lars Boom (Astana), Theo Bos (MTN–Qhubeka) and Bradley Wiggins (Team Sky). All were unhurt and able to finish the stage.

Despite the presence of Marcel Kittel, the team's principal sprinter, Team Giant–Alpecin were riding in support of Nikias Arndt. Kittel took a turn in his lead-out train; since he was in poor form following a period of illness, he had requested the team support Arndt instead.

In the final kilometre, the Katusha team moved to the front before Kristoff again started his sprint early; again, the other sprinters were unable to catch him and he crossed the finish line first. He was only slightly ahead of Peter Sagan (Tinkoff–Saxo), who was so close at the finish line that Kristoff was unsure whether he had won. Arndt was third after Team Giant–Alpecin had done excellent work in the last kilometre.

There was a small split in the peloton at the end of the race. Several riders lost five seconds, including Terpstra, Ian Stannard (Team Sky), Luke Rowe (Team Sky), Greg Van Avermaet (BMC Racing Team) and Tom Boonen (Etixx–Quick-Step). Kristoff moved up into fifth place in the overall standings thanks to this split and the time bonus for winning the stage. He also took over leadership of the silver jersey of the points classification. Terpstra retained his overall lead, while Rowe remained the leader of the young riders classification.

Stage 4 result
| Rank | Rider | Team | Time |
|---|---|---|---|
| 1 | Alexander Kristoff (NOR) | Team Katusha | 4h 15' 57" |
| 2 | Peter Sagan (SVK) | Tinkoff–Saxo | + 0" |
| 3 | Nikias Arndt (GER) | Team Giant–Alpecin | + 0" |
| 4 | Adam Blythe (GBR) | Orica–GreenEDGE | + 0" |
| 5 | Nicola Ruffoni (ITA) | Bardiani–CSF | + 0" |
| 6 | Heinrich Haussler (AUS) | IAM Cycling | + 0" |
| 7 | Borut Božič (SLO) | Astana | + 0" |
| 8 | Andrea Guardini (ITA) | Astana | + 0" |
| 9 | José Joaquín Rojas (SPA) | Movistar Team | + 0" |
| 10 | Sacha Modolo (ITA) | Lampre–Merida | + 0" |

General classification after stage 4
| Rank | Rider | Team | Time |
|---|---|---|---|
| 1 | Niki Terpstra (NED) | Etixx–Quick-Step | 12h 09' 44" |
| 2 | Maciej Bodnar (POL) | Tinkoff–Saxo | + 6" |
| 3 | Ian Stannard (GBR) | Team Sky | + 12" |
| 4 | Greg Van Avermaet (BEL) | BMC Racing Team | + 19" |
| 5 | Alexander Kristoff (NOR) | Team Katusha | + 21" |
| 6 | Luke Rowe (GBR) | Team Sky | + 33" |
| 7 | Peter Sagan (SVK) | Tinkoff–Saxo | + 37" |
| 8 | Heinrich Haussler (AUS) | IAM Cycling | + 39" |
| 9 | Andriy Hrivko (UKR) | Astana | + 41" |
| 10 | Tom Boonen (BEL) | Etixx–Quick-Step | + 42" |

=== Stage 5 ===
12 February 2015 — Al Zubara Fort to Madinat ash Shamal, 153 km (95 mi)

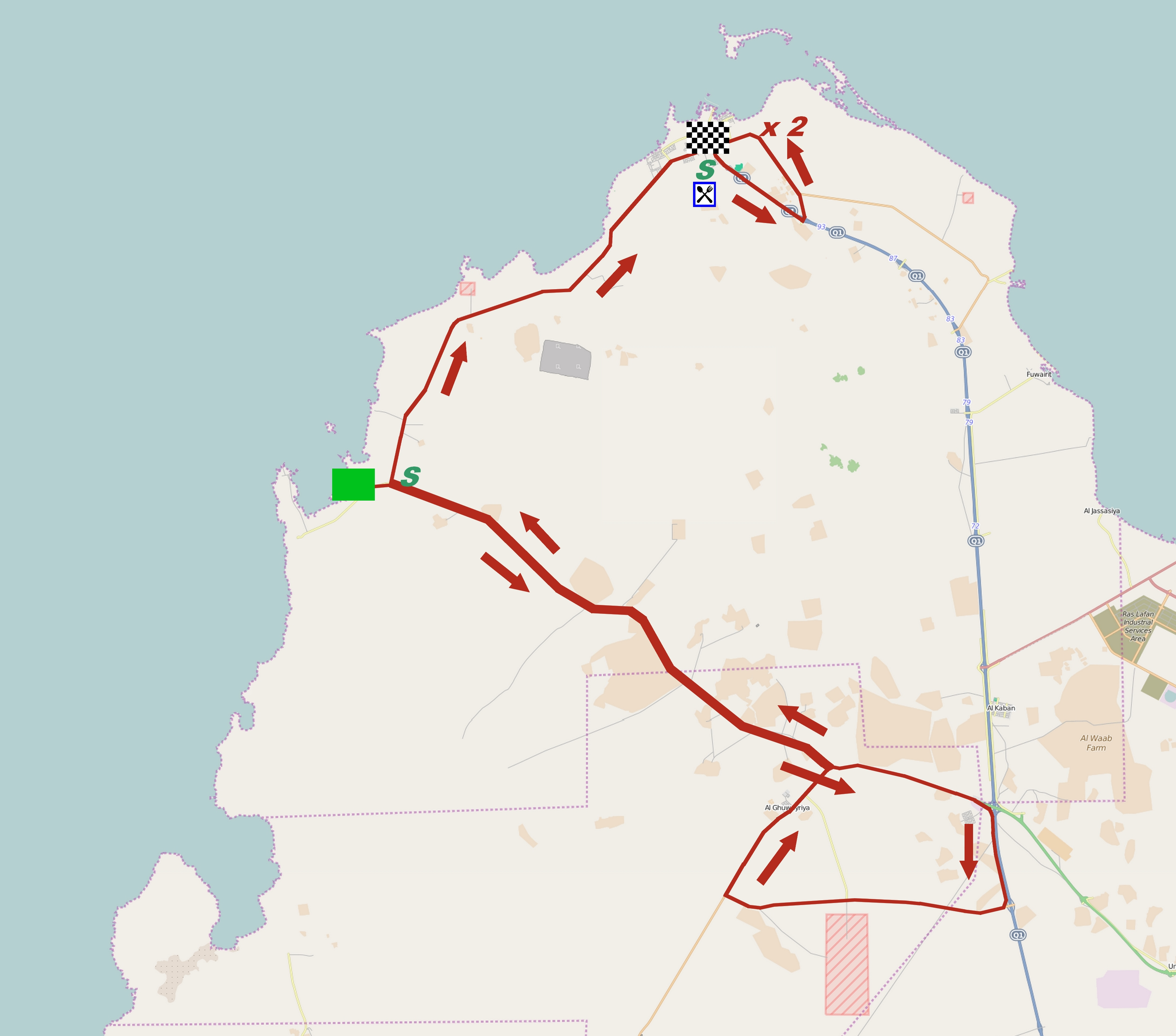
Stage 5 route

Stage 5 was a 153 km (95 mi) route starting at Al Zubara Fort. The riders first travelled east towards Al Ghuwariyah, before returning to Al Zubarah. The route then took them north-east along the coast, before finishing with two laps of a circuit in Madinat ash Shamal.

Etixx–Quick-Step once again attacked early in the stage, breaking the peloton into echelons in the opening kilometres. Maciej Bodnar (Tinkoff–Saxo), in second place overnight, was among the riders who failed to make the lead group. The gap between the groups never extended much beyond half a minute and, after around 60 km (37 mi) of racing, Bodnar's group was able to rejoin the lead group and the racing, which had been frenetic until that point, calmed down.

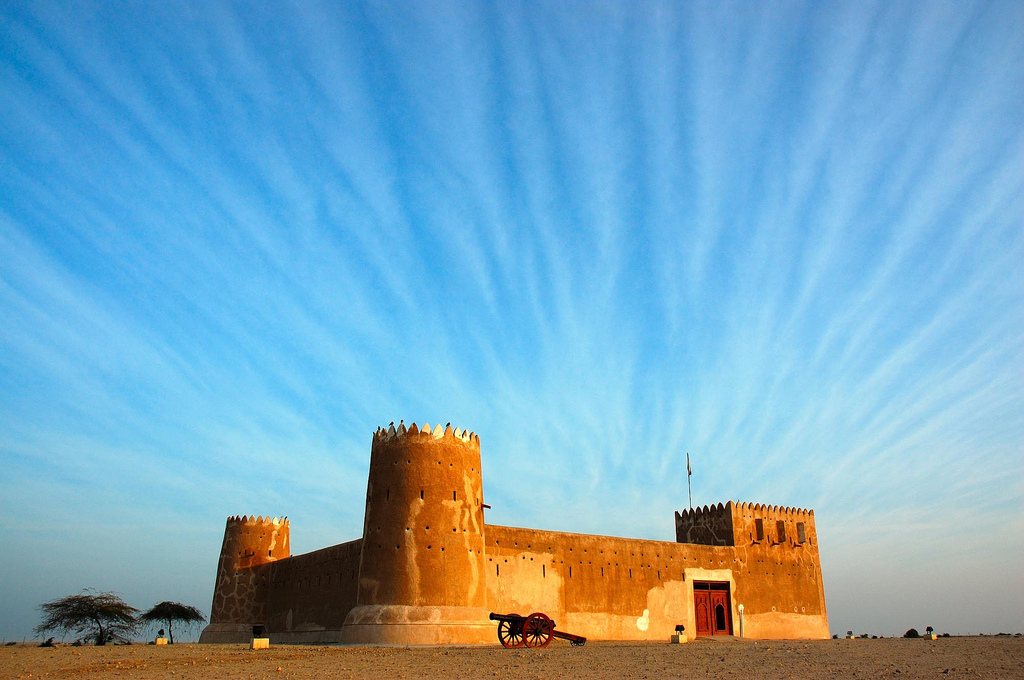
Al Zubara Fort, the starting location of the stage

At that point a breakaway formed, made up of Ben Hermans (BMC Racing Team), Marco Haller (Team Katusha), Jelle Wallays (Topsport Vlaanderen–Baloise), Dmitriy Gruzdev (Astana) and Mathew Hayman (Orica–GreenEDGE). The five riders at one point had a lead of over two and a half minutes. Hayman won both intermediate sprints and at one point was virtual leader of the race, before the peloton behind took up the chase in earnest. The breakaway was caught with 13 km (8 mi) remaining.

In the final six kilometres, Team Katusha and BMC Racing Team attacked and forced another split in the peloton. Tom Boonen was among two Etixx–Quick-Step riders in the 10-man front group, but Niki Terpstra, the race leader, was not. Alexander Kristoff (Team Katusha) and Maciej Bodnar were in the lead group, which built a lead of 15 seconds. Terpstra would have lost the race lead, but Etixx–Quick-Step were able to bring the groups back together. After the race, it was revealed that the three Tinkoff–Saxo riders in the leading group were not aware that Terpstra had been dropped and, with team radios banned, directeur sportif Bjarne Riis was not able to inform them.

As they approached the finishing line, Kristoff again opened his sprint early and was able to hold off the rest of the field for his third stage victory of the race. Peter Sagan (Tinkoff–Saxo) finished second and Nikias Arndt, again sprinting for Team Giant–Alpecin in place of Marcel Kittel, finished third. Sagan therefore moved into first place in the young riders competition, overtaking Luke Rowe (Team Sky).

Thanks to the time bonus on the finish line, Kristoff was now in third place overall, just 11 seconds behind Terpstra. This meant that Kristoff could win the overall victory in the race if he was able to win the final stage and take time bonuses at the intermediate sprints.

Following the stage, the race organisers announced that Lars Boom (Astana) had been disqualified from the race. His bike had developed a puncture about 20 km (12 mi) from the finish and he had attempted to regain contact with the peloton by chasing in the slipstream of his team car.

Stage 5 result
| Rank | Rider | Team | Time |
|---|---|---|---|
| 1 | Alexander Kristoff (NOR) | Team Katusha | 3h 03' 01" |
| 2 | Peter Sagan (SVK) | Tinkoff–Saxo | + 0" |
| 3 | Nikias Arndt (GER) | Team Giant–Alpecin | + 0" |
| 4 | Tom Boonen (BEL) | Etixx–Quick-Step | + 0" |
| 5 | Adam Blythe (GBR) | Orica–GreenEDGE | + 0" |
| 6 | Heinrich Haussler (AUS) | IAM Cycling | + 0" |
| 7 | José Joaquín Rojas (SPA) | Movistar Team | + 0" |
| 8 | Arnaud Démare (FRA) | FDJ | + 0" |
| 9 | Greg Van Avermaet (BEL) | BMC Racing Team | + 0" |
| 10 | Nacer Bouhanni (FRA) | Cofidis | + 0" |

General classification after stage 5
| Rank | Rider | Team | Time |
|---|---|---|---|
| 1 | Niki Terpstra (NED) | Etixx–Quick-Step | 15h 12' 45" |
| 2 | Maciej Bodnar (POL) | Tinkoff–Saxo | + 6" |
| 3 | Alexander Kristoff (NOR) | Team Katusha | + 11" |
| 4 | Ian Stannard (GBR) | Team Sky | + 12" |
| 5 | Greg Van Avermaet (BEL) | BMC Racing Team | + 19" |
| 6 | Peter Sagan (SVK) | Tinkoff–Saxo | + 31" |
| 7 | Luke Rowe (GBR) | Team Sky | + 33" |
| 8 | Heinrich Haussler (AUS) | IAM Cycling | + 39" |
| 9 | Andriy Hrivko (UKR) | Astana | + 41" |
| 10 | Tom Boonen (BEL) | Etixx–Quick-Step | + 42" |

=== Stage 6 ===
13 February 2015 — Sealine Beach Resort to Doha Corniche, 124.5 km (77 mi)

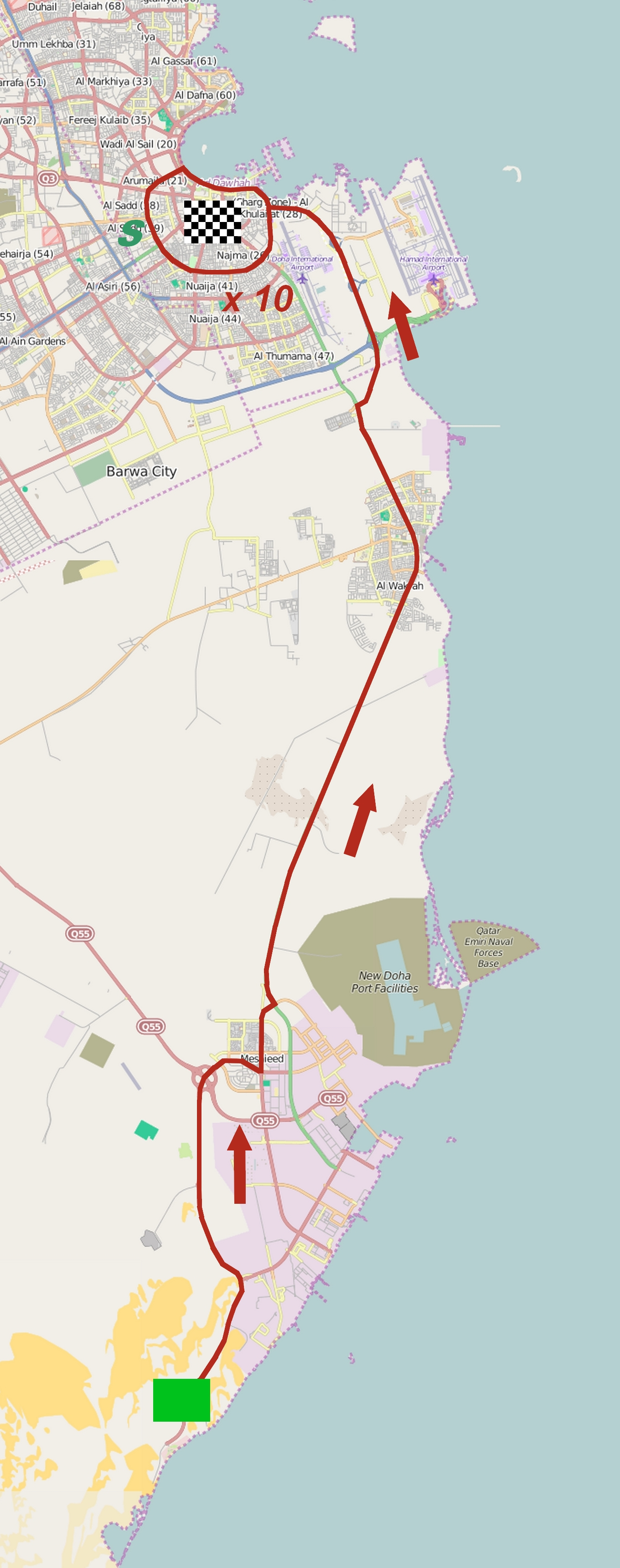
Stage 6 route

The final stage of the 2015 Tour of Qatar started where stage 1 had finished, at the Sealine Beach Resort south of Mesaieed. It took the riders north to Doha. In Doha, the riders rode to the Doha Corniche, where they completed ten laps of a 5.7 km (3.5 mi) finishing circuit.

After the previous stage, Niki Terpstra (Etixx–Quick-Step) had indicated that his team would happily allow a breakaway to win the stage in order to deny Alexander Kristoff (Team Katusha) the possibility of taking overall victory with the aid of the bonus seconds for the stage win and intermediate sprints. A break was allowed to go away early, formed of Marcus Burghardt (BMC Racing Team), Preben Van Hecke (Topsport Vlaanderen–Baloise), Nicola Boem and Stefano Pirazzi (both Bardiani–CSF). They were able to build a lead of over two minute, but Team Katusha took up the chase to support Kristoff in seeking bonus seconds.

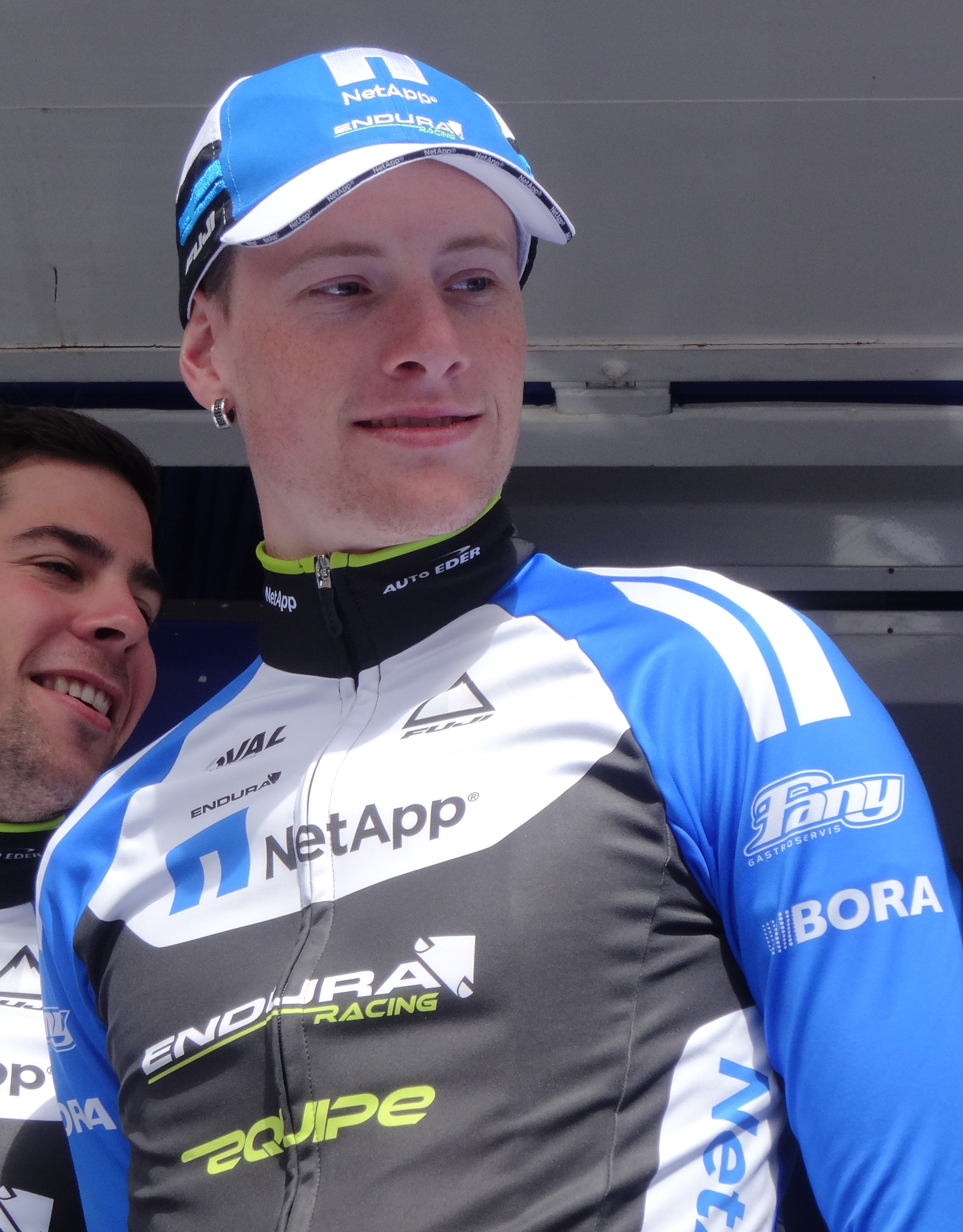
Sam Bennett (pictured here in 2014) won stage 6

The two intermediate sprints were both located on the finish line of the finishing circuit, on the fourth and seventh lap. Burghardt, Van Hecke, and Boem were caught first, while Pirazzi was caught on lap 4. Etixx–Quick-Step attempted to place riders in the sprint to prevent Kristoff winning the bonus seconds; they succeeded in winning the sprint with Tom Boonen, but Matteo Trentin was beaten by Kristoff to second place. Kristoff therefore won two bonus seconds, placing him nine seconds behind Terpstra. With a ten-second bonus available to the stage winner, Kristoff was now within reach of the overall win.

Etixx–Quick-Step then sent their rider Iljo Keisse into a breakaway alongside Gijs Van Hoecke (Topsport Vlaanderen–Baloise), with the intent of preventing Kristoff winning any more bonus seconds. Keisse won the intermediate sprint with Van Hoecke second; they then allowed the peloton – led by Katusha – to catch them.

In the final kilometres of the stage, Team Katusha, who had done most of the work throughout the day, were unable to maintain their position at the head of the peloton. After the stage, Kristoff admitted that his team was tired from their work during the week. Fabian Cancellara put in an attack in the final five kilometres, but was brought back by the peloton led in particular by IAM Cycling and Astana. In the final kilometre, Tinkoff–Saxo came to the front in support of Peter Sagan.

Sam Bennett (Bora–Argon 18) was given a strong lead-out by his teammates. He was then able to follow Andrea Guardini (Astana), who launched his sprint with 200 m (660 ft) to go. Bennett was then able to come past and take his first win of 2015, which he later described as the biggest of his career so far.

Kristoff finished 19th; he therefore failed to gain the bonus seconds he needed for overall victory and finished nine seconds behind Terpstra. Terpstra therefore won the Tour of Qatar for the second successive season. Kristoff won the silver jersey of the points competition, thanks to his three stage wins, while Sagan won the young riders competition. Etixx–Quick-Step won the teams competition.

Stage 6 result
| Rank | Rider | Team | Time |
|---|---|---|---|
| 1 | Sam Bennett (IRE) | Bora–Argon 18 | 2h 24' 03" |
| 2 | Andrea Guardini (ITA) | Astana | + 0" |
| 3 | Nacer Bouhanni (FRA) | Cofidis | + 0" |
| 4 | Peter Sagan (SVK) | Tinkoff–Saxo | + 0" |
| 5 | Youcef Reguigui (ALG) | MTN–Qhubeka | + 0" |
| 6 | Adam Blythe (GBR) | Orica–GreenEDGE | + 0" |
| 7 | Matteo Trentin (ITA) | Etixx–Quick-Step | + 0" |
| 8 | Tom Boonen (BEL) | Etixx–Quick-Step | + 0" |
| 9 | Jasper Stuyven (BEL) | Trek Factory Racing | + 0" |
| 10 | José Joaquín Rojas (SPA) | Movistar Team | + 0" |

Final general classification
| Rank | Rider | Team | Time |
|---|---|---|---|
| 1 | Niki Terpstra (NED) | Etixx–Quick-Step | 17h 36' 48" |
| 2 | Maciej Bodnar (POL) | Tinkoff–Saxo | + 6" |
| 3 | Alexander Kristoff (NOR) | Team Katusha | + 9" |
| 4 | Ian Stannard (GBR) | Team Sky | + 12" |
| 5 | Greg Van Avermaet (BEL) | BMC Racing Team | + 19" |
| 6 | Peter Sagan (SVK) | Tinkoff–Saxo | + 31" |
| 7 | Luke Rowe (GBR) | Team Sky | + 33" |
| 8 | Heinrich Haussler (AUS) | IAM Cycling | + 39" |
| 9 | Tom Boonen (BEL) | Etixx–Quick-Step | + 39" |
| 10 | Andriy Hrivko (UKR) | Astana | + 41" |

== Classification leadership table ==
In the 2015 Tour of Qatar, three different jerseys were awarded. The first of these was the general classification. It was calculated by adding together the times recorded in each stage of the race, then making adjustments to take account of bonus seconds won for stage victories and intermediate sprints in the road stages (the winner of the individual time trial did not receive bonus seconds). The winner of each stage received a ten-second bonus; the rider coming second received a six-second bonus; the third rider across the line received a four-second bonus. Similarly, the winner, second-placed and third-placed riders in intermediate sprints won three-, two- and one-second bonuses respectively. If two riders were tied on the same time, the precise time (to one-hundredths of a second) recorded in the time trial would have been used to separate the riders. The leader of the general classification wore a gold jersey and the winner of the competition is considered the overall winner of the race.

The points classification was determined by adding together the points that each rider won on each stage. Points were awarded for coming in the top ten in the stage (the winner won 15 points; the tenth-placed rider won one point). Points were also awarded for coming in the top three in the intermediate sprints that took place on each road stage (three points for the winner, two for the second-placed rider and one for the third). The leader of the points classification was awarded a silver jersey.

The third classification was the young rider classification. This was open to riders born on or after 1 January 1990. The first eligible rider in the general classification was considered the leader of the young rider classification and was awarded a pearl white jersey.

Finally, there was a classification for teams. After each stage, the times of the first three riders on each team were added together. The team with the lowest cumulative time was the leader of the team classification.

| Stage | Winner | General classification | Points classification | Young rider classification | Teams classification |
|---|---|---|---|---|---|
| 1 | José Joaquín Rojas | José Joaquín Rojas | José Joaquín Rojas | Arnaud Démare | Astana |
| 2 | Alexander Kristoff | Alexander Kristoff | Tom Boonen | Peter Sagan | Etixx–Quick-Step |
| 3 | Niki Terpstra | Niki Terpstra | Tom Boonen | Luke Rowe | Etixx–Quick-Step |
| 4 | Alexander Kristoff | Niki Terpstra | Alexander Kristoff | Luke Rowe | Etixx–Quick-Step |
| 5 | Alexander Kristoff | Niki Terpstra | Alexander Kristoff | Peter Sagan | Etixx–Quick-Step |
| 6 | Sam Bennett | Niki Terpstra | Alexander Kristoff | Peter Sagan | Etixx–Quick-Step |
| Final | | Niki Terpstra | Alexander Kristoff | Peter Sagan | Etixx–Quick-Step |
