= 2014 Omloop Het Nieuwsblad =

Race details
- Dates: 1 March
- Stages: 1
- Distance: 198 km (123 mi)
- Winning time: 4h 49' 55"

Results
	Winner	Ian Stannard (GBR)	(Team Sky)
	Second	Greg Van Avermaet (BEL)	(BMC Racing Team)
	Third	Edvald Boasson Hagen (NOR)	(Team Sky)

The 2014 Omloop Het Nieuwsblad took place on 1 March 2014. It was the 69th edition of the international classic Omloop Het Nieuwsblad.

Team Sky's Ian Stannard of Great Britain beat BMC Racing Team's Greg Van Avermaet of Belgium in a two-up sprint.

== Teams ==
Non-UCI ProTeams are indicated by an asterisk below. Each of the 21 teams were permitted up to eight riders, for a maximum of 168 riders. 164 riders started the race.

The 21 teams invited to the race were:

- Ag2r–La Mondiale
- Androni Giocattoli–Venezuela*
- Belkin Pro Cycling
- BMC Racing Team
- Bretagne–Séché Environnement*
- CCC–Polsat–Polkowice*
- Cofidis*
- Team Europcar
- FDJ.fr
- Garmin–Sharp
- Giant–Shimano
- IAM Cycling*
- Team Katusha
- Lotto–Belisol
- MTN–Qhubeka*
- NetApp–Endura*
- Omega Pharma–Quick-Step
- RusVelo*
- Team Sky
- Topsport Vlaanderen–Baloise*
- Wanty–Groupe Gobert*

== Results ==
Race result
Rank	Rider	Team	Time
1	Ian Stannard (GBR)	Team Sky	4h 49' 55"
2	Greg Van Avermaet (BEL)	BMC Racing Team	+ 0"
3	Edvald Boasson Hagen (NOR)	Team Sky	+ 24"
4	Sep Vanmarcke (BEL)	Belkin Pro Cycling	+ 24"
5	Niki Terpstra (NED)	Omega Pharma–Quick-Step	+ 24"
6	Jempy Drucker (LUX)	Wanty–Groupe Gobert	+ 1' 34"
7	Taylor Phinney (USA)	BMC Racing Team	+ 1' 34"
8	Dries Devenyns (BEL)	Giant–Shimano	+ 1' 34"
9	Egoitz García (ESP)	Cofidis	+ 1' 34"
10	Arnaud Démare (FRA)	FDJ.fr	+ 1' 34"
