= List of wins by Leopard Trek and its successors =

This is a comprehensive list of victories of the Lidl–Trek cycling team. The races are categorized according to the UCI Continental Circuits rules.

== 2011 – Leopard Trek ==
Le Samyn, Dominic Klemme
Stage 7 Tirreno–Adriatico, Fabian Cancellara
Overall Critérium International, Fränk Schleck

Stage 1, Fränk Schleck

E3 Harelbeke, Fabian Cancellara
Stages 1, 3 & 5 Circuit de la Sarthe, Daniele Bennati
Stage 5 Bayern Rundfahrt, Giacomo Nizzolo
Overall Tour de Luxembourg, Linus Gerdemann

Prologue (ITT), Fabian Cancellara
Stage 2, Linus Gerdemann

Stages 1 & 9 Tour de Suisse, Fabian Cancellara
Germany Road Race Championships, Robert Wagner
Switzerland Road Race Championships, Fabian Cancellara
Luxembourg Road Race Championships, Fränk Schleck
Stage 8 Tour of Austria, Daniele Bennati
Stage 18 Tour de France, Andy Schleck
Stage 3 Tour de Wallonie, Daniele Bennati
Stage 3 Danmark Rundt, Jakob Fuglsang
Stage 20 Vuelta a España, Daniele Bennati
Binche–Tournai–Binche, Rüdiger Selig
Giro di Lombardia, Oliver Zaugg

== 2012 – RadioShack–Nissan ==
Luxembourg Road Race Championships, Laurent Didier
Denmark Time Trial Championships, Jakob Fuglsang
Switzerland Time Trial Championships, Fabian Cancellara
Strade Bianche, Fabian Cancellara
Stage 7 (ITT) Tirreno–Adriatico, Fabian Cancellara
Overall Tour de Luxembourg, Jakob Fuglsang
Team classification Tour de France

Prologue (ITT), Fabian Cancellara

Overall Tour of Austria, Jakob Fuglsang

Stage 4, Jakob Fuglsang

Overall Tour de Wallonie, Giacomo Nizzolo

Stage 3, Giacomo Nizzolo

Stage 5 Eneco Tour, Giacomo Nizzolo
Stage 3 Tour du Poitou-Charentes, Giacomo Nizzolo
Stage 4 USA Pro Cycling Challenge, Jens Voigt
Stage 18 Vuelta a España, Daniele Bennati

== 2013 – RadioShack–Leopard ==
New Zealand National Road Race Championships, Hayden Roulston
Gran Premio Nobili Rubinetterie, Bob Jungels
E3 Harelbeke, Fabian Cancellara
Tour of Flanders, Fabian Cancellara
Paris–Roubaix, Fabian Cancellara
Stage 5 Tour of California, Jens Voigt
Stage 6 Tour de Suisse, Grégory Rast
Stages 2 & 3 Tour de Luxembourg, Giacomo Nizzolo
Stage 4 Tour de Luxembourg, Bob Jungels
Switzerland National Time Trial Championships, Fabian Cancellara
Luxembourg National Time Trial Championships, Bob Jungels
Belgium National Road Race Championships, Stijn Devolder
Croatia National Road Race Championships, Robert Kišerlovski
Luxembourg National Road Race Championships, Bob Jungels
Stage 2 Tour de France, Jan Bakelants
Stage 7 (ITT) Tour of Austria, Fabian Cancellara
Clásica de San Sebastián, Tony Gallopin
Stage 5 Tour of Utah, Chris Horner
Overall Vuelta a España, Chris Horner

Combination classification, Chris Horner
Stages 3 & 10, Chris Horner
Stage 11 (ITT), Fabian Cancellara

== 2014 – Trek Factory Racing ==
New Zealand National Road Race Championships, Hayden Roulston
Stages 2 & 6 Tour de San Luis, Julián Arredondo
Stage 3 Tour de San Luis, Giacomo Nizzolo
Stage 1 Driedaagse van West-Vlaanderen, Danny van Poppel
Tour of Flanders, Fabian Cancellara
Belgium National Time Trial Championships, Kristof Vandewalle
Mountains classification Giro d'Italia, Julián Arredondo

Stage 18, Julián Arredondo

Prologue (ITT) Tour de Luxembourg, Danny van Poppel
Switzerland National Time Trial Championships, Fabian Cancellara
Luxembourg National Time Trial Championships, Laurent Didier
Japan National Time Trial Championships, Fumiyuki Beppu
Austria National Road Race Championships, Riccardo Zoidl
Luxembourg National Road Race Championships, Fränk Schleck
Stage 5 Tour of Austria, Jesse Sergent
Stage 7 (ITT) Tour of Austria, Kristof Vandewalle
Stage 2 Tour de Wallonie, Giacomo Nizzolo
Stage 7 (ITT) Tour de Pologne, Kristof Vandewalle
Stage 5 USA Pro Cycling Challenge, Laurent Didier

== 2015 – Trek Factory Racing ==
Stage 2 Tour of Oman, Fabian Cancellara
Overall Étoile de Bessèges, Bob Jungels

Stage 5 (ITT), Bob Jungels

Stage 2 Driedaagse van West-Vlaanderen, Danny van Poppel
Stage 7 (ITT) Tirreno–Adriatico, Fabian Cancellara
Gran Premio Nobili Rubinetterie, Giacomo Nizzolo
Stage 2 (ITT) Critérium International, Fabio Felline
Stage 2 Tour of the Basque Country, Fabio Felline
United States National Road Race Championships, Matthew Busche
Points classification Giro d'Italia, Giacomo Nizzolo
Luxembourg National Time Trial Championships, Bob Jungels
Luxembourg National Road Race Championships, Bob Jungels
Stages 2 & 5 Tour de Wallonie, Danny van Poppel
Stage 8 Vuelta a España, Jasper Stuyven
Stage 12 Vuelta a España, Danny van Poppel
Grand Prix de Fourmies, Fabio Felline
Stage 16 Vuelta a España, Fränk Schleck
Overall Tour of Alberta, Bauke Mollema

Stage 1 (TTT)

Japan Cup, Bauke Mollema

== 2016 – Trek–Segafredo ==
Australia National Road Race Championships, Jack Bobridge
Trofeo Serra de Tramuntana, Fabian Cancellara
Stage 3 (ITT) Volta ao Algarve, Fabian Cancellara
Kuurne–Brussels–Kuurne, Jasper Stuyven
Strade Bianche, Fabian Cancellara
Stage 7 Tirreno–Adriatico, Fabian Cancellara
Stages 1 & 3 Tour of Croatia, Giacomo Nizzolo
Stages 4 Tour of Croatia, Riccardo Zoidl
Stage 1 Tour of Belgium, Edward Theuns
Points classification Giro d'Italia, Giacomo Nizzolo
GP du canton d'Argovie, Giacomo Nizzolo
Stage 1 (ITT) Tour de Suisse, Fabian Cancellara
Switzerland National Time Trial Championships, Fabian Cancellara
Italy National Road Race Championships, Giacomo Nizzolo
Stage 3 Tour de Pologne, Niccolò Bonifazio
Clásica de San Sebastián, Bauke Mollema
Olympic Men's Time Trial, Fabian Cancellara
Points classification Vuelta a España, Fabio Felline
Gran Piemonte, Giacomo Nizzolo

== 2017 – Trek–Segafredo ==
Overall Vuelta a San Juan, Bauke Mollema
Stage 3 Dubai Tour, John Degenkolb
Colombia Time Trial Championships, Jarlinson Pantano
Prologue (ITT) Tour de Romandie, Fabio Felline
Stage 3 (ITT) Tour of Belgium, Matthias Brändle
Stage 2 Hammer Sportzone Limburg
Portugal Road Race Championships, Ruben Guerreiro
Denmark Road Race Championships, Mads Pedersen
Stage 15 Tour de France, Bauke Mollema
Stage 4 BinckBank Tour, Edward Theuns
Stage 7 BinckBank Tour, Jasper Stuyven
Stage 20 Vuelta a España, Alberto Contador
Overall Tour du Poitou-Charentes, Mads Pedersen

Stage 3, Mads Pedersen
Stage 4 (ITT), Matthias Brändle

Stage 6 Tour of Turkey, Edward Theuns

== 2018 – Trek–Segafredo ==
Stage 3 (ITT) Vuelta a San Juan, Ryan Mullen
Trofeo Campos, Porreres, Felanitx, Ses Salines, John Degenkolb
Trofeo Lloseta – Andratx, Toms Skujiņš
Trofeo Palma, John Degenkolb
Stage 7 Vuelta a San Juan, Giacomo Nizzolo
Stage 2 Herald Sun Tour, Mads Pedersen
Stage 5 Volta a Catalunya, Jarlinson Pantano
Stage 2 Settimana Internazionale di Coppi e Bartali, Bauke Mollema
Stage 3 Tour of California, Toms Skujiņš
Fyen Rundt, Mads Pedersen
Ethiopia National Time Trial Championships, Tsgabu Grmay
Ireland National Time Trial Championships, Ryan Mullen
Latvia National Time Trial Championships, Toms Skujiņš
Stage 9 Tour de France, John Degenkolb
Stage 4 BinckBank Tour, Jasper Stuyven
Grand Prix de Wallonie, Jasper Stuyven
Grote Prijs Jef Scherens, Jasper Stuyven
Tour de l'Eurométropole, Mads Pedersen
Gran Premio Bruno Beghelli, Bauke Mollema
Tre Valli Varesine, Toms Skujiņš

== 2019 – Trek–Segafredo ==
Stage 6 Tour Down Under, Richie Porte
Stage 4 Tour La Provence, John Degenkolb
Stage 2 Tour du Haut Var, Giulio Ciccone
Mountains classification Giro d'Italia, Giulio Ciccone

Stage 16, Giulio Ciccone

Ireland National Time Trial Championships, Ryan Mullen
Latvia National Road Race Championships, Toms Skujiņš
Overall Deutschland Tour, Jasper Stuyven
Grand Prix Impanis-Van Petegem, Edward Theuns
Grand Prix d'Isbergues, Mads Pedersen
World Road Race, Mads Pedersen
Il Lombardia, Bauke Mollema
Japan Cup, Bauke Mollema

== 2020 – Trek–Segafredo ==
Overall Tour Down Under, Richie Porte

Stage 3, Richie Porte

Trofeo Campos, Porreres, Felanitx, Ses Salines, Matteo Moschetti
Trofeo de Playa de Palma-Palma, Matteo Moschetti
Stage 3 Tour du Haut Var, Julien Bernard
Omloop Het Nieuwsblad, Jasper Stuyven
Stage 2 Tour de Pologne, Mads Pedersen
Luxembourg National U23 Time Trial Championships, Michel Ries
Stage 3 BinckBank Tour, Mads Pedersen
Gent–Wevelgem, Mads Pedersen

== 2021 – Trek–Segafredo ==
Overall Tour des Alpes-Maritimes et du Var, Gianluca Brambilla

Stage 1, Bauke Mollema
Stage 3, Gianluca Brambilla

Kuurne–Brussels–Kuurne, Mads Pedersen
Trofeo Laigueglia, Bauke Mollema
Milan–San Remo, Jasper Stuyven
Per sempre Alfredo, Matteo Moschetti
Stage 5 Tour de Hongrie, Edward Theuns
Latvia National Time Trial Championships, Toms Skujiņš
Latvia National Road Race Championships, Toms Skujiņš
Stage 14 Tour de France, Bauke Mollema
Overall Tour de Wallonie, Quinn Simmons

Stage 3, Quinn Simmons

Stage 2 Danmark Rundt, Mads Pedersen
Stage 3 Tour of Norway, Mads Pedersen
Ireland National Time Trial Championships, Ryan Mullen
Overall Giro di Sicilia, Vincenzo Nibali

Stage 4, Vincenzo Nibali

Ireland National Road Race Championships, Ryan Mullen

== 2022 – Trek–Segafredo ==
Stage 1 Étoile de Bessèges, Mads Pedersen
Stage 4 Volta a la Comunitat Valenciana, Matteo Moschetti
Stage 3 Paris–Nice, Mads Pedersen
Stages 1 & 3 Circuit de la Sarthe, Mads Pedersen
Stage 2 International Tour of Hellas, Matteo Moschetti
Stage 5 Tour de Hongrie, Antonio Tiberi
Stage 15 Giro d'Italia, Giulio Ciccone
Stage 1 Tour of Belgium, Mads Pedersen
Latvia National Time Trial Championships, Toms Skujiņš
Netherlands National Time Trial Championships, Bauke Mollema
Latvia National Road Race Championships, Emīls Liepiņš
Denmark National Road Race Championships, Alexander Kamp
Stage 13 Tour de France, Mads Pedersen
Points classification, Vuelta a España, Mads Pedersen

Stages 13, 16 & 19, Mads Pedersen

Overall Tour de Luxembourg, Mattias Skjelmose Jensen

Stage 4 (ITT), Mattias Skjelmose Jensen

== 2023 – Trek–Segafredo / Lidl–Trek ==
Stage 3 Vuelta a San Juan, Quinn Simmons
Stage 2 Volta a la Comunitat Valenciana, Giulio Ciccone
Stage 4 Étoile de Bessèges, Mattias Skjelmose Jensen
Stage 5 (ITT) Étoile de Bessèges, Mads Pedersen
Stage 2 Tour des Alpes-Maritimes et du Var, Mattias Skjelmose Jensen
Stage 2 Paris–Nice, Mads Pedersen
Stage 2 Volta a Catalunya, Giulio Ciccone
Stage 6 Giro d'Italia, Mads Pedersen
Stage 2 Tour of Norway, Thibau Nys
Grand Prix of Aargau Canton, Thibau Nys
Stage 8 Critérium du Dauphiné, Giulio Ciccone
Overall Tour de Suisse, Mattias Skjelmose Jensen

Stage 3, Mattias Skjelmose Jensen

Latvia National Time Trial Championships, Toms Skujiņš
Luxembourg National Time Trial Championships, Alex Kirsch
Eritrea National Time Trial Championships, Amanuel Ghebreigzabhier
Czech Republic National Road Race Championships, Mathias Vacek
Latvia National Road Race Championships, Emīls Liepiņš
Denmark National Road Race Championships, Mattias Skjelmose Jensen
Luxembourg National Road Race Championships, Alex Kirsch
United States National Road Race Championships, Quinn Simmons
Stage 8 Tour de France, Mads Pedersen
Overall Danmark Rundt, Mads Pedersen

Stage 3, Mattias Skjelmose Jensen
Stage 5, Mads Pedersen

BEMER Cyclassics, Mads Pedersen
Maryland Cycling Classic, Mattias Skjelmose Jensen

== 2024 – Lidl–Trek ==
South Africa National Time Trial Championships, Ryan Gibbons
Overall Étoile de Bessèges, Mads Pedersen

Stage 3, Mads Pedersen

Stage 3 Volta a la Comunitat Valenciana, Jonathan Milan
South Africa National Road Race Championships, Ryan Gibbons
Overall Tour de la Provence, Mads Pedersen

Prologue, Stages 1 & 2, Mads Pedersen

Stages 4 & 7 Tirreno–Adriatico, Jonathan Milan
Stage 6 Paris–Nice, Mattias Skjelmose
Gent–Wevelgem, Mads Pedersen
Overall Tour of the Alps, Juan Pedro López

Stage 3, Juan Pedro López

Stage 2 Tour de Romandie, Thibau Nys
Stages 4, 11 & 13 Giro d'Italia, Jonathan Milan
Overall Tour de Hongrie, Thibau Nys

Stages 3 & 4, Thibau Nys

Stage 1 Tour of Norway, Thibau Nys
Stage 1 Critérium du Dauphiné, Mads Pedersen
Stage 3 Tour de Suisse, Thibau Nys
Eritrea Time Trial Championships, Amanuel Gebrezgabihier
Eritrea Road Race Championships, Natnael Tesfatsion
Netherlands Time Trial Championships, Daan Hoole
Czech Republic Time Trial Championships, Mathias Vacek
Denmark Time Trial Championships, Mattias Skjelmose

== 2025 – Lidl–Trek ==
Stage 1 (TTT) Volta a la Comunitat Valenciana
Stage 5 Volta a la Comunitat Valenciana, Jonathan Milan
Overall Tour de la Provence, Mads Pedersen

Stage 2 Tour de la Provence, Mads Pedersen

Stages 1 & 4 UAE Tour, Jonathan Milan

== Supplementary statistics ==
Legend
—	Did not compete
OTL	Finished over time limit
DNF	Did not finish
DNS	Did not start
NH	Not held

Grand Tours by highest finishing position
Race	2011	2012	2013	2014	2015	2016	2017	2018	2019	2020	2021	2022	2023	2024
Giro d'Italia	DNF (Note: The team withdrew before stage 5 after the death of Wouter Weylandt.)	31	14	10	32	39	7	18	5	7	18	10	31	39
Tour de France	2	6	14	8	7	11	9	26	11	3	20	25	29	
Vuelta a España	6	16	1	87	23	19	5	16	28	42	13	64	17	
Major week-long stage races by highest finishing position
Race	2011	2012	2013	2014	2015	2016	2017	2018	2019	2020	2021	2022	2023	2024
Tour Down Under	30	3	5	23	26	33	18	9	2	1	NH (Note: Not held due to the COVID-19 pandemic.)		8	15
UAE Tour	Race did not Exist								27	15	6	25	7	9
Paris–Nice	10	7	9	18	23	44	2	30	34	4	28	18	39	4
Tirreno–Adriatico	41	2	6	5	2	9	9	33	19	9	9	10	5	29
Volta a Catalunya	19	34	17	10	22	30	2	42	29	NH	56	16	7	17
Tour of the Basque Country	12	9	23	16	31	18	2	7	21	NH	41	11	17	3
Tour de Romandie	11	15	14	12	37	9	4	24	24	NH	15	22	44	9
Critérium du Dauphiné	19	10	14	28	42	42	11	17	11	15	21	22	11	8
Tour de Suisse	4	2	20	29	6	19	31	12	14	NH	16	44	1	3
Tour de Pologne	15	5	11	51	14	2	40	13	17	16	43	43	34	
Benelux Tour	10	10	4	45	5	33	3	10	11	5	7	NH (Note: The race was cancelled due to an overcrowded calendar.)	4	
Monument races by highest finishing position
Race	2011	2012	2013	2014	2015	2016	2017	2018	2019	2020	2021	2022	2023	2024
Milan–San Remo	2	2	3	2	7	17	7	10	34	23	1	6	6	4
Tour of Flanders	3	11	1	1	13	2	7	2	19	26	4	8	5	10
Paris–Roubaix	2	13	1	3	20	39	4	5	27	NH	25	7	4	3
Liège–Bastogne–Liège	2	23	29	19	35	9	16	25	26	16	8	29	9	13
Il Lombardia	1	8	14	22	38	19	19	37	1	4	13	7	43	
Classics by highest finishing position
Classic	2011	2012	2013	2014	2015	2016	2017	2018	2019	2020	2021	2022	2023	2024
Cadel Evans Great Ocean Road Race	Race did not Exist				21	3	26	14	29	16	NH		13	2
Omloop Het Nieuwsblad	13	–	–	–	–	8	4	4	40	1	63	10	35	7
Kuurne–Brussels–Kuurne	15	–	NH	–	–	1	2	22	14	5	1	15	10	10
Strade Bianche	5	1	4	6	8	1	13	OTL (Note: No member of the team that finished did so within the time limit.)	9	32	18	7	12	2
E3 Harelbeke	1	22	1	9	42	4	11	6	22	NH	14	15	14	2
Gent–Wevelgem	2	6	9	19	24	4	5	9	2	1	DNS (Note: The team withdrew after returning positive COVID-19 tests.)	4	5	1
Amstel Gold Race	4	12	29	24	23	14	8	23	12	NH	40	5	8	7
La Flèche Wallonne	7	20	16	11	19	35	37	6	6	8	11	18	2	12
Clásica de San Sebastián	5	14	1	7	6	1	3	2	5	NH	10	4	6	
