= Oliver Naesen =

Belgian cyclist (born 1990)

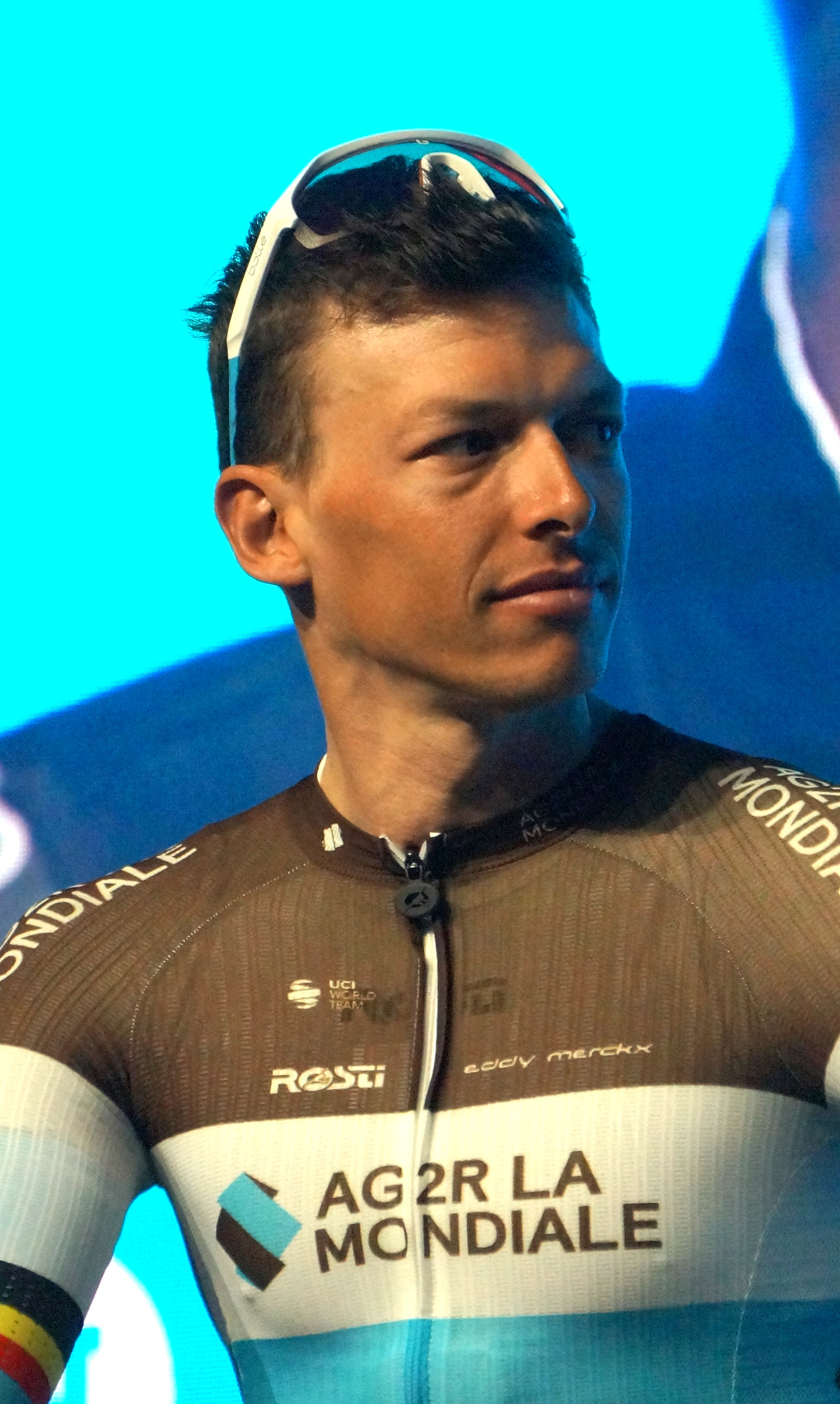
- Naesen in 2020

Personal information
- Full name: Oliver Naesen
- Born: 16 September 1990 (age 36) Ostend, Flanders, Belgium
- Height: 1.84 m (6 ft 1/2 in)
- Weight: 71 kg (157 lb; 11 st 3 lb)

Cycling career
- Sport: Cycling
- Current team: Decathlon CMA CGM Team
- Discipline: Road
- Role: Rider
- Rider type: Classics specialist

Amateur team
- 2014: Lotto–Belisol (stagiaire)

Professional teams
- 2014: Cibel
- 2015: Topsport Vlaanderen–Baloise
- 2016: IAM Cycling
- 2017–: AG2R La Mondiale

Major wins
- One-day races and Classics National Road Race Championships (2017) Bretagne Classic (2016, 2018)

Oliver Naesen (Dutch: [ˈɔlivər ˈnaːsə(n)]; born 16 September 1990) is a Belgian professional racing cyclist, who currently rides for UCI WorldTeam Decathlon CMA CGM Team. Considered a specialist of the one-day classics, he won the 2017 Belgian National Road Race Championships, as well as the Bretagne Classic in 2016 and 2018. He is the brother of fellow racing cyclist Lawrence Naesen.

== Career ==
=== 2014–2016 ===
Naesen turned professional in August 2014 as a stagiaire with the Lotto–Belisol team, before joining Topsport Vlaanderen–Baloise in 2015 and Swiss UCI WorldTeam IAM Cycling in 2016.

He made his Grand Tour debut at the 2016 Tour de France, in which he was awarded the combativity award on the fourth stage. He made a spectacular crash in the last corner of the stage 18 mountain time trial, but finished his maiden Tour in 83rd position overall.

Weeks after the Tour de France, he won the Bretagne Classic; his first victory in a UCI World Tour race. In September, he finished second in the general classification of the 2016 Eneco Tour after a strong performance in the final stage to Geraardsbergen. His results earned him a selection for the World Championship road race in Qatar, in which he finished 23rd.

=== AG2R La Mondiale (2017–present) ===
Following the discontinuation of the IAM Cycling team, Naesen signed a two-year contract with French team AG2R La Mondiale. In the spring of 2017, he confirmed his status as a classics talent with top-10 finishes in the Omloop Het Nieuwsblad, Kuurne–Brussels–Kuurne, E3 Harelbeke and Gent–Wevelgem. In the Tour of Flanders, he was in a three-man chase group behind Philippe Gilbert, when Peter Sagan, leading the group, crashed on Oude Kwaremont and brought down Naesen and Greg Van Avermaet. Naesen and Sagan broke their bike frames, preventing them from defending their podium positions, and Naesen ultimately finished 23rd. In Summer, he won the 2017 Belgian National Road Race Championships in Antwerp, before competing in his second Tour de France.

In 2018, he finished 11th at the Tour of Flanders and 12th in Paris–Roubaix. In August, he won the Bretagne Classic Ouest–France for the second time in three years.

== Major results ==
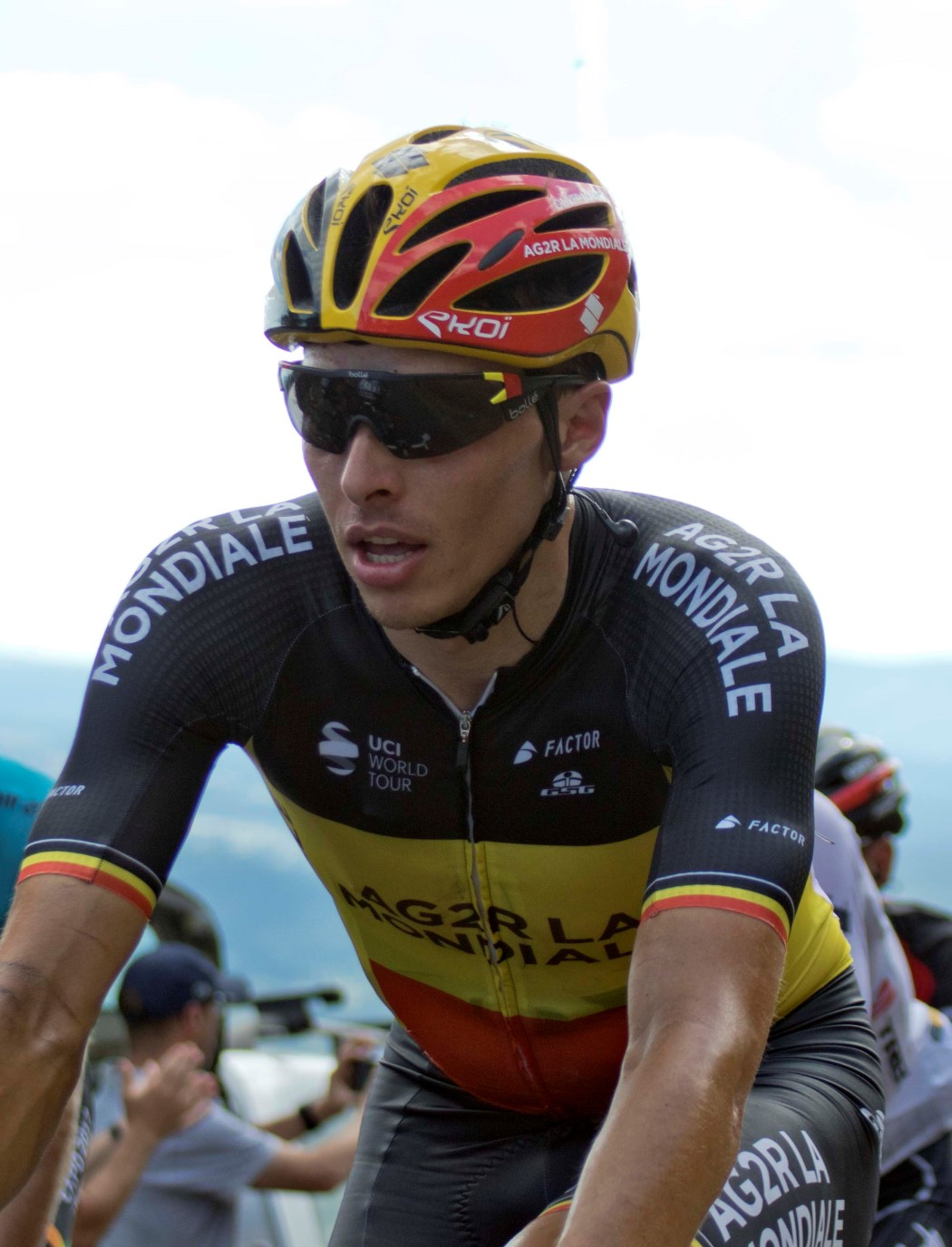
Naesen, wearing the Belgian national champion jersey, at the 2017 Tour de France

2013
10th Grote Prijs Stad Geel
2014
3rd Memorial Van Coningsloo
4th Ronde van Limburg
6th Binche–Chimay–Binche
6th Omloop Het Nieuwsblad U23
8th Gooikse Pijl
9th Handzame Classic
10th Druivenkoers Overijse
10th Internationale Wielertrofee Jong Maar Moedig
10th Flèche Ardennaise
2015 (1 pro win)
1st Polynormande
1st Gooikse Pijl
2nd Schaal Sels
3rd Grote Prijs Stad Zottegem
3rd Omloop van het Waasland
5th Druivenkoers Overijse
6th Overall Tour de Luxembourg

1st Young rider classification

7th Overall Tour of Belgium
10th Le Samyn
10th Tour de Vendée
2016 (1)
1st Bretagne Classic
1st GP Lucien Van Impe
2nd Overall Eneco Tour
2nd Tour de l'Eurométropole
10th Binche–Chimay–Binche
Combativity award Stage 4 Tour de France
2017 (1)
1st Road race, National Road Championships
3rd Overall Four Days of Dunkirk
3rd E3 Harelbeke
5th Overall BinckBank Tour
6th Paris–Tours
6th Dwars door Vlaanderen
6th Tour de l'Eurométropole
7th Omloop Het Nieuwsblad
8th Overall Tour of Belgium
8th Kuurne–Brussels–Kuurne
10th London–Surrey Classic
10th Binche–Chimay–Binche
2018 (1)
1st Bretagne Classic
3rd Eschborn–Frankfurt
3rd Binche–Chimay–Binche
3rd Tour de l'Eurométropole
4th E3 Harelbeke
4th Grand Prix Cycliste de Montréal
4th Paris–Tours
6th Gent–Wevelgem
9th Grand Prix d'Isbergues
2019 (1)
2nd Overall BinckBank Tour

1st Stage 7

2nd Milan–San Remo
2nd Binche–Chimay–Binche
3rd Gent–Wevelgem
3rd Paris–Tours
7th Tour of Flanders
8th E3 Binckbank Classic
8th London–Surrey Classic
10th Omloop Het Nieuwsblad
10th EuroEyes Cyclassics
2020
7th Tour of Flanders
7th Omloop Het Nieuwsblad
10th Overall Tour de Wallonie
2021
4th E3 Saxo Bank Classic
7th Tro-Bro Léon
2022
2nd Overall Four Days of Dunkirk
3rd Famenne Ardenne Classic
4th Omloop Het Nieuwsblad
7th Bretagne Classic
8th Primus Classic
2023
9th Famenne Ardenne Classic
2024
4th Omloop Het Nieuwsblad
7th Tour of Flanders
7th Binche–Chimay–Binche
8th Overall Four Days of Dunkirk

=== Grand Tour general classification results timeline ===
Grand Tour	2016	2017	2018	2019	2020	2021	2022	2023
Giro d'Italia	Has not contested during his career							
Tour de France	83	63	66	68	61	70	DNF	76
Vuelta a España	Has not contested during his career							

=== Classics results timeline ===
Monument	2014	2015	2016	2017	2018	2019	2020	2021	2022	2023	2024
Milan–San Remo	—	—	—	—	62	2	14	21	—	74	106
Tour of Flanders	—	35	22	23	11	7	7	33	41	40	7
Paris–Roubaix	—	57	13	31	12	13	NH	52	54	66	24
Liège–Bastogne–Liège	Has not contested during his career										
Giro di Lombardia	Has not contested during his career										
Classic	2014	2015	2016	2017	2018	2019	2020	2021	2022	2023	2024
Omloop Het Nieuwsblad	—	31	13	7	27	10	7	19	4	19	4
Kuurne–Brussels–Kuurne	—	25	77	8	11	43	23	16	20	79	16
E3 Harelbeke	—	—	—	3	4	8	NH	4	21	47	25
Gent–Wevelgem	—	32	DNF	22	6	3	14	16	59	18	11
Dwars door Vlaanderen	—	40	DNF	6	DNF	19	NH	19	DNF	84	63
Amstel Gold Race	—	92	35	13	93	28	NH	—	—	—	108
Eschborn–Frankfurt	—	—	—	DNF	3	16	NH	—	—	—	DNF
Bretagne Classic	—	—	1	DNF	1	17	—	—	7	DNF	
Grand Prix Cycliste de Québec	—	—	68	17	14	20	Not held		—	—	
Grand Prix Cycliste de Montréal	—	—	15	16	4	36	Not held		—	—	
Paris–Tours	32	27	25	6	4	3	—	—	55	117	

=== Major championships timeline ===
Event	2015	2016	2017	2018	2019	2020	2021
World Championships	—	23	73	—	33	DNF	—
National Championships	10	30	1	43	22	48	9

Legend
—	Did not compete
DNF	Did not finish
NH	Not held
