= Søren Kragh Andersen =

Danish cyclist (born 1994)

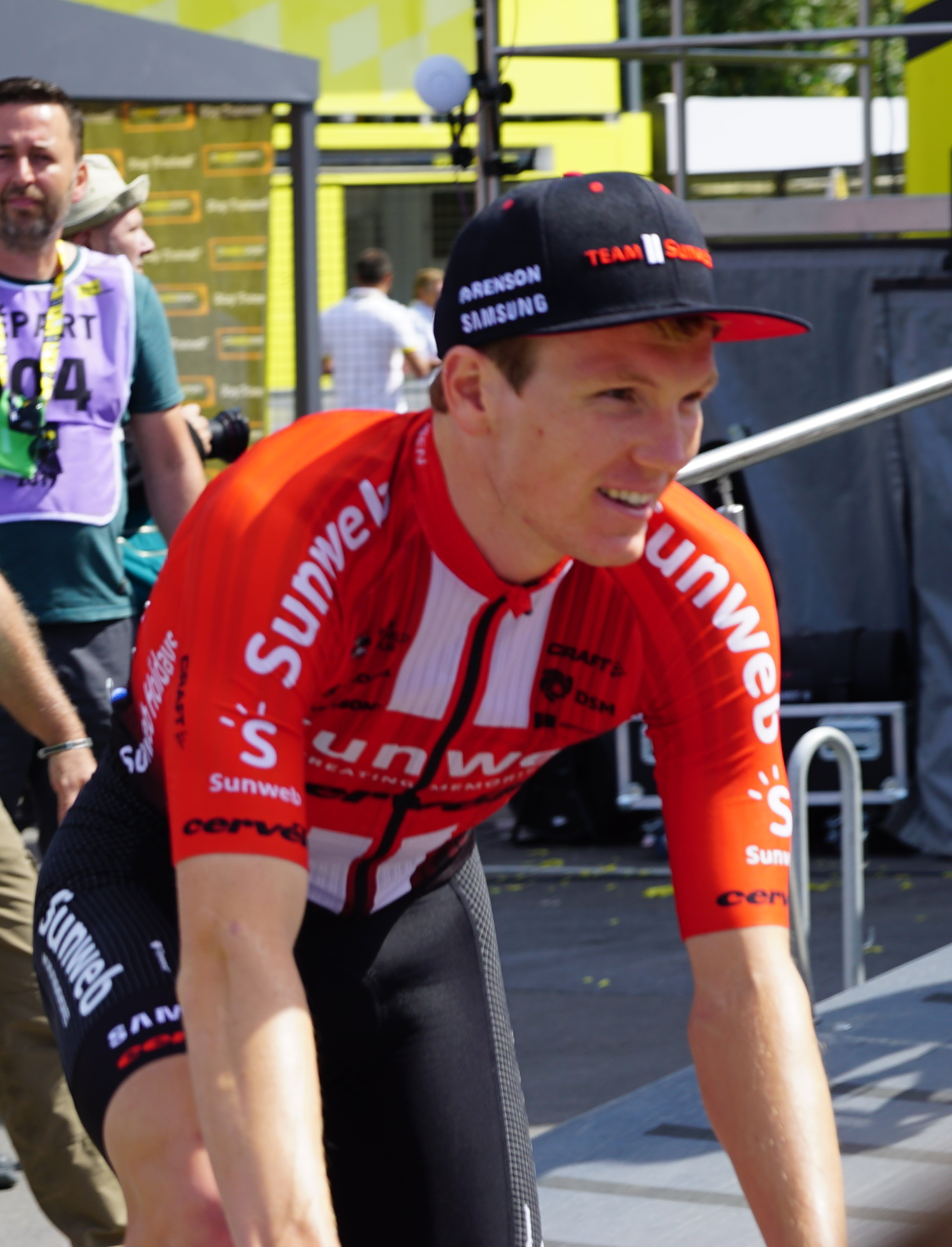
- Kragh Andersen in 2019

Personal information
- Full name: Søren Kragh Andersen
- Nicknames: Basse; The Kraghen
- Born: 10 August 1994 (age 32) Strib, Funen, Denmark
- Height: 1.78 m (5 ft 10 in)
- Weight: 73 kg (161 lb)

Cycling career
- Sport: Cycling
- Current team: Lidl–Trek
- Discipline: Road
- Role: Rouleur; Classics specialist

Professional teams
- 2013–2015: Team TreFor
- 2016–2022: Team Giant–Alpecin
- 2023–2024: Alpecin–Deceuninck
- 2025–: Lidl–Trek

Major wins
- Grand Tours Tour de France 2 individual stages (2020) One-day races and Classics National Road Race Championships (2025) Eschborn–Frankfurt (2023) Paris–Tours (2018)

Søren Kragh Andersen (born 10 August 1994) is a Danish cyclist who currently rides for UCI WorldTeam Lidl–Trek. He is the younger brother of Asbjørn Kragh Andersen, who was also a professional cyclist, until his retirement in 2022.

== Career ==
After three seasons with UCI Continental squad Team TreFor, Andersen joined Team Giant–Alpecin in 2016 on an initial two-year contract. In February 2017, he won stage 3 of the Tour of Oman. In August, competed in the Vuelta a España. The following month, he was part of the winning team in the UCI world team time trial championships. He took his first World Tour victory the following June of stage six of the Tour de Suisse. In July, he entered his first Tour de France. During the race, Kragh Andersen held the lead of the young rider classification for seven days, ceding the lead on stage 10. Towards the end of the season, he won the semi-classic Paris–Tours in a solo fashion. At the 2020 Tour de France, Kragh Andersen won stages 14 and 19 of the race, with late-stage solo attacks of 3.2 kilometres (2.0 miles) and 16 kilometres (9.9 miles) respectively.

In 2023, Kragh Andersen moved to Alpecin–Deceuninck, winning Eschborn–Frankfurt in May from an eight-man breakaway.

== Major results ==
2011
1st Stage 4 Trofeo Karlsberg
2nd Road race, National Junior Road Championships
2nd Overall Tour du Pays de Vaud

1st Stage 3 & 4

2nd Overall GP Denmark
6th Overall Rothaus Regio-Tour International
6th Overall Liège–La Gleize
6th Overall Course de la Paix Juniors
2012
1st Prologue Tour du Pays de Vaud
2nd Overall Course de la Paix Juniors

1st Stage 3

2nd Overall Tour of Istria
3rd Overall Rothaus Regio-Tour International

1st Points classification
1st Stage 1

7th Overall Liège–La Gleize
10th Road race, UCI Junior Road World Championships
2014
1st Time trial, National Under-23 Road Championships
3rd Himmerland Rundt
3rd La Côte Picarde
8th Overall Tour of Taihu Lake

1st Young rider classification

2015 (1 pro win)
1st Overall ZLM Roompot Tour

1st Stages 1 & 2 (TTT)

1st Hadeland GP
Tour de l'Avenir

1st Prologue & Stage 3

National Under-23 Road Championships

2nd Time trial
3rd Road race

2nd Overall Tour des Fjords

1st Stage 4

2nd Ringerike GP
4th Overall Tour de Berlin
5th Time trial, National Road Championships
6th Volta Limburg Classic
9th Skive–Løbet
10th Overall Paris–Arras Tour

1st Mountains classification

2016
4th Overall Ster ZLM Toer
6th Overall Tour of Qatar

1st Young rider classification

2017 (1)
1st Team time trial, UCI Road World Championships
1st Stage 3 Tour of Oman
2nd Paris–Tours
4th Time trial, National Road Championships
5th Overall Ster ZLM Toer
2018 (2)
1st Paris–Tours
1st Stage 6 Tour de Suisse
2nd Team time trial, UCI Road World Championships
7th Overall BinckBank Tour
8th Overall Tour des Fjords
Tour de France

Held after Stages 3–9

2019
2nd Overall Volta ao Algarve
2020 (4)
Tour de France

1st Stages 14 & 19

2nd Overall BinckBank Tour

1st Stage 4 (ITT)

3rd Omloop Het Nieuwsblad
10th Overall Paris–Nice

1st Stage 4 (ITT)

2021
6th Overall Danmark Rundt
9th Milan–San Remo
2022
4th Overall Danmark Rundt
5th Gent–Wevelgem
7th Milan–San Remo
2023 (1)
1st Eschborn–Frankfurt
3rd Binche–Chimay–Binche
5th Milan–San Remo
5th Paris–Bourges
6th Overall Tour de Luxembourg

1st Points classification

6th Le Samyn
9th E3 Saxo Classic
10th Overall Renewi Tour
2024
4th Overall Danmark Rundt
8th Eschborn–Frankfurt
2025 (1)
1st Road race, National Road Championships
6th Overall Danmark Rundt
2026
5th Overall Danmark Rundt
7th Overall Tour de Luxembourg
8th Ronde van Limburg
10th Copenhagen Sprint

=== Grand Tour general classification results timeline ===
Grand Tour	2016	2017	2018	2019	2020	2021	2022	2023	2024	2025
Giro d'Italia	—	—	—	—	—	—	—	—	—	DNF
Tour de France	—	—	52	DNF	58	DNF	—	122	DNF	—
Vuelta a España	—	106	—	—	—	—	—	—	—	148
Major stage race general classification results
Race	2016	2017	2018	2019	2020	2021	2022	2023	2024	2025
Paris–Nice	—	—	—	—	10	DNF	17	44	—	—
Tirreno–Adriatico	78	35	DNF	35	—	—	—	—	—	—
Volta a Catalunya	—	—	—	—	NH	—	—	—	—	—
Tour of the Basque Country	—	—	—	—	NH	—	—	—	—	—
Tour de Romandie	—	—	—	—	NH	—	—	—	—	
Critérium du Dauphiné	—	—	—	—		80	—	—	—	—
Tour de Suisse	—	—	59	66	NH	69	DNF	93	86	

=== Classics results timeline ===
Monument	2016	2017	2018	2019	2020	2021	2022	2023	2024	2025
Milan–San Remo	—	121	—	52	57	9	7	5	31	—
Tour of Flanders	DNF	74	53	DNF	DNF	58	DNS	DNF	DNF	—
Paris–Roubaix	DNF	DNF	DNF	—	NH	24	—	—	—	—
Liège–Bastogne–Liège	—	DNF	—	—	—	—	25	DNF	67	
Giro di Lombardia	Has not contested during his career									
Classic	2016	2017	2018	2019	2020	2021	2022	2023	2024	2025
Omloop Het Nieuwsblad	—	26	47	—	3	23	103	99	—	—
Kuurne–Brussels–Kuurne	DNF	—	—	—	58	28	—	—	94	—
Strade Bianche	—	—	23	—	DNF	—	—	—	—	—
E3 Saxo Bank Classic	92	75	25	DNF	NH	42	DNF	9	36	—
Gent–Wevelgem	DNF	16	—	11	—	35	5	68	50	—
Dwars door Vlaanderen	—	—	38	—	NH	DNF	17	—	74	—
Amstel Gold Race	—	—	DNF	DNF	NH	DNF	29	40	112	
La Flèche Wallonne	—	—	—	—	—	—	40	81	37	
Eschborn–Frankfurt	—	—	—	—	NH	DNF	—	1	8	
Paris–Tours	—	2	1	DNF	101	91	—	—	98	

Legend
—	Did not compete
DNF	Did not finish
DNS	Did not start
NH	Not held
