= Jasper Stuyven =

Belgian cyclist (born 1992)

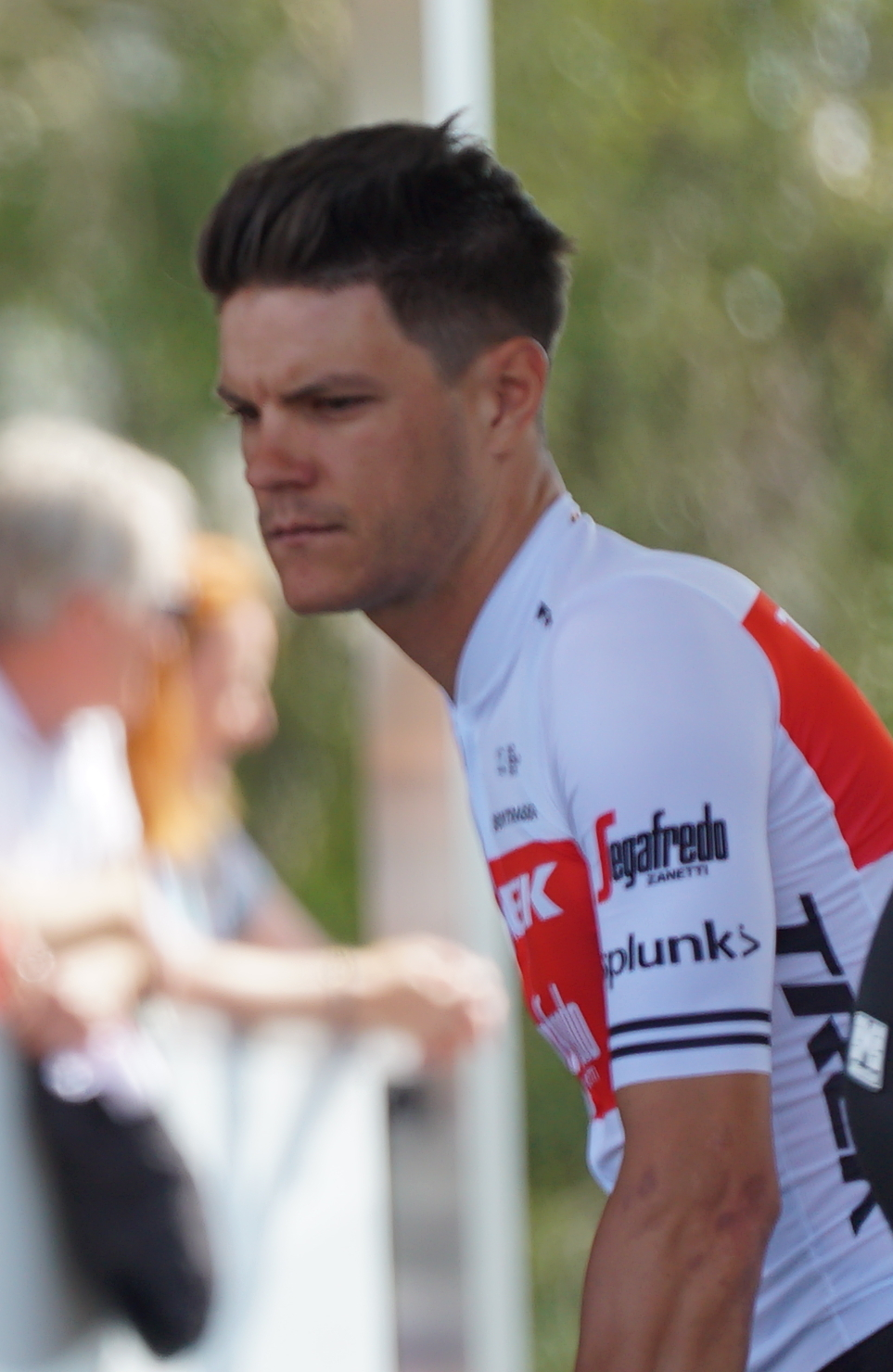
- Stuyven at the 2019 Tour de France

Personal information
- Nickname: The Chocolatier from Flanders
- Born: 17 April 1992 (age 34) Leuven, Flanders, Belgium
- Height: 1.86 m (6 ft 1 in)
- Weight: 78 kg (172 lb)

Cycling career
- Sport: Cycling
- Current team: Soudal–Quick-Step
- Disciplines: Road; Track
- Role: Rider
- Rider type: Classics specialist All-rounder

Amateur teams
- 2009–2010: Avia Cycling Team
- 2011: Ovyta–Eijssen–Acrog

Professional teams
- 2012–2013: Bontrager–Livestrong
- 2014–2025: Trek Factory Racing
- 2026–: Soudal–Quick-Step

Major wins
- Gravel European Championships (2023) National Championships (2023) Road Grand Tours Vuelta a España 1 individual stage (2015) Stage races Deutschland Tour (2019) One-day Races and Classics Milan–San Remo (2021) Omloop Het Nieuwsblad (2020) Kuurne–Brussels–Kuurne (2016)
Medal record
Men's gravel bicycle racing
Representing Belgium
European Championships
Gold medal – first place	2023 Oud-Heverlee	Elite

Jasper Stuyven (born 17 April 1992) is a Belgian professional racing cyclist who rides for UCI WorldTeam Soudal–Quick-Step. He is considered to be a classics specialist, and has won several major races including the 2021 Milan–San Remo, one of cycling's monuments, the 2020 Omloop Het Nieuwsblad and the 2016 Kuurne–Brussels–Kuurne. He has also had success in stage races, winning the overall classification of the 2019 Deutschland Tour as well as a stage of the 2015 Vuelta a España. Stuyven has also competed in six editions of the Tour de France, finishing on the podium several times on different stages.

== Career ==
=== Juniors ===
Born in Leuven, Stuyven had a successful career as a junior rider. In 2009, at age 17, he won the UCI Junior World Road Race Championships. 2010 brought Stuyven more successes when he won one day races Paris-Roubaix Juniors and Remouchamps–Ferrières–Remouchamps.

=== Early years ===
He began his professional career at age 20 for Bontrager–Livestrong; he earned four victories with the team, including the Volta ao Alentejo.

=== Trek Factory Racing (2014–present) ===
==== 2014 ====
Stuyven joined UCI WorldTeam Trek Factory Racing in 2014 at the age of 22. During this season, he rode in his first grand tour, the Vuelta a España. In this race, he earned fourth place in three stages and finished ninth in the points classification.

==== 2015 ====
2015 brought Stuyven his biggest victory yet, when he won stage 8 of the Vuelta a España in a reduced bunch sprint. Stuyven had been involved in a crash earlier in the stage and he was forced to withdraw from the race after the stage with a broken scaphoid.

==== 2016 ====
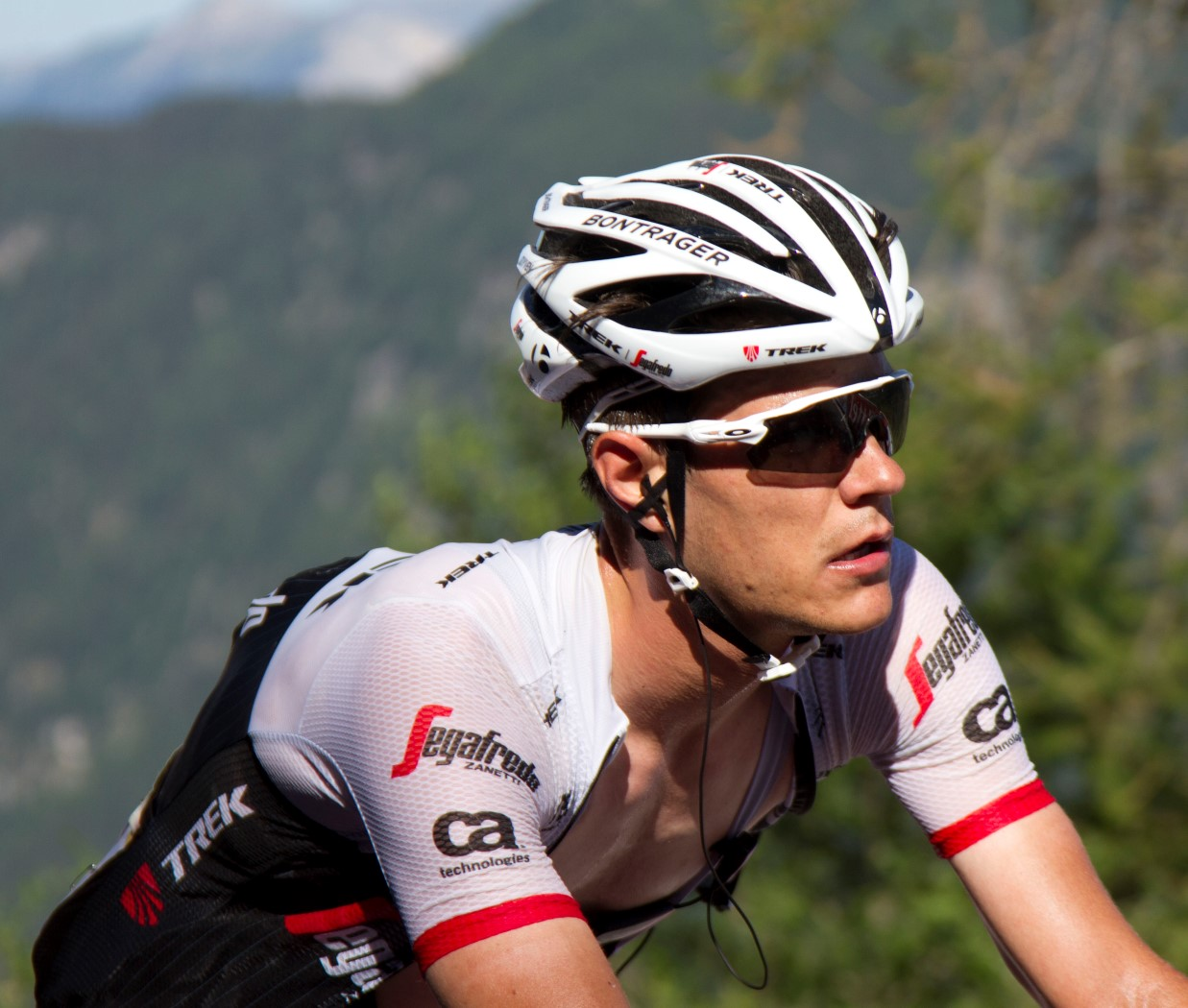
Stuyven at the 2016 Tour de France

In 2016, he won the Belgian one-day race Kuurne–Brussels–Kuurne by breaking away solo for the last 17 kilometres (11 miles) of the race. Stuyven also earned a fifth place at the E3 Harelbeke. He was named in the start list for the Tour de France where he held the polka-dot jersey as leader of the mountains classification for two days.

==== 2017 ====
Stuyven was part of the 5 man leading group at Paris–Roubaix, and finished fourth in the sprint finish behind Greg Van Avermaet of BMC Racing Team. He rode in the Giro d'Italia. In stage six, Stuyven finished second behind Silvan Dillier of BMC Racing Team after the pair had been part of a five-man breakaway that rode clear of the peloton for almost all of the 217-kilometre (135-mile) stage. Stuyven finished the race in 98th place overall, and was second in the points classification behind Fernando Gaviria of Quick-Step Floors.

==== 2018 ====
In 2018, Stuyven finished in the top 10 in many of the spring classics, including 4th place in Omloop Het Nieuwsblad, and 5th in Paris–Roubaix, being part of the chase group with Sep Vanmarcke and defending champion Greg Van Avermaet. In the Tour de France, he came close to winning stage 14 but was overtaken on the last climb by eventual stage winner Omar Fraile with less than 3 kilometres (1.9 miles) to go; for his efforts, however, he walked away with the day's combativity award. In September, he first won the Grand Prix de Wallonie, before winning his home town race in Leuven, the Grote Prijs Jef Scherens.

==== 2019 ====
In late August, Stuyven won the Deutschland Tour after taking the overall lead on stage 3. He carried his good form into the autumn classics with several top ten results, including two podium finishes at the Grand Prix de Wallonie and the Tour de l'Eurométropole.

==== 2020 ====
Before the COVID-19 pandemic shut down the 2020 road cycling season, Stuyven got off to a strong start. In the opening weekend of the Belgian road cycling season, he won Omloop Het Nieuwsblad, beating fellow Belgian Yves Lampaert in a two-up sprint, before finishing fifth in Kuurne–Brussels–Kuurne the day after. Once racing resumed, he bookended August with a pair of fifth-place finishes in the Circuito de Getxo on 2 August and then in the UEC European Road Championships road race on 26 August.

==== 2021 ====
On 20 March, Stuyven won Milan-San Remo for his first Monument victory. With three kilometers left, he attacked at the bottom of the descent of the Poggio, the last climb in the race. Many of the main pre-race favorites in the lead group were hesitant to chase him down, though Søren Kragh Andersen managed to bridge across to Stuyven in the final kilometer. With the group closing down the duo, Stuyven launched out of Kragh Andersen's slipstream in the last 200 meters. Though he was on his limit, he held on for the win on the line just ahead of the chasing group, led home by Caleb Ewan ahead of defending champion Wout van Aert.

== Personal life ==
Stuyven studied at the Sint-Pieterscollege in Leuven. Outside of cycling, he and his uncle Ivan, an experienced chocolatier, run a small chocolate boutique in Betekom named Chocolade Atelier Stuyven that opened in 2016 and often produces many cycling-themed pieces.

== Major results ==
=== Road ===
2009
1st Road race, UCI World Junior Championships
2nd Overall Giro della Toscana
3rd Overall Driedaagse van Axel
4th Overall Keizer der Juniores
2010
1st Paris–Roubaix Juniors
1st Remouchamps–Ferrières–Remouchamps
1st Stage 4 3 Giorni Orobica
3rd Road race, UCI World Junior Championships
4th Overall Driedaagse van Axel

1st Stage 3

2011
2nd Paris–Roubaix Espoirs
2012
1st Stage 3 Cascade Classic
7th Grand Prix de Wallonie
2013
1st Overall Volta ao Alentejo

1st Points classification
1st Young rider classification
1st Stage 2

1st Stage 1 Tour de Beauce
3rd Grote Prijs Jef Scherens
3rd Liège–Bastogne–Liège Espoirs
2015 (1 pro win)
1st Stage 8 Vuelta a España
2016 (1)
1st Kuurne–Brussels–Kuurne
5th E3 Harelbeke
9th Omloop Het Nieuwsblad
Tour de France

Held after Stages 2–4
Combativity award Stage 2

2017 (1)
2nd Kuurne–Brussels–Kuurne
3rd Road race, National Championships
3rd Overall BinckBank Tour

1st Stage 7

4th Paris–Roubaix
5th Brussels Cycling Classic
6th Japan Cup
7th Eschborn-Frankfurt – Rund um den Finanzplatz
7th EuroEyes Cyclassics
8th Omloop Het Nieuwsblad
2018 (3)
1st Grand Prix de Wallonie
1st Grote Prijs Jef Scherens
2nd Brussels Cycling Classic
3rd Road race, National Championships
3rd Grand Prix Cycliste de Québec
3rd Kampioenschap van Vlaanderen
4th Omloop Het Nieuwsblad
5th Paris–Roubaix
6th E3 Harelbeke
7th Tour of Flanders
9th Gent–Wevelgem
9th Halle–Ingooigem
10th Overall BinckBank Tour

1st Stage 4

10th Milan–San Remo
10th Dwars door Vlaanderen
10th Tour de l'Eurométropole
Combativity award Stage 14 Tour de France
2019 (1)
1st Overall Deutschland Tour
2nd Grand Prix de Wallonie
3rd Tour de l'Eurométropole
4th London–Surrey Classic
5th Grand Prix Cycliste de Québec
5th Brussels Cycling Classic
6th Binche–Chimay–Binche
6th Grand Prix de Fourmies
2020 (1)
1st Omloop Het Nieuwsblad
5th Road race, UEC European Championships
5th Kuurne–Brussels–Kuurne
5th Circuito de Getxo
2021 (1)
1st Milan–San Remo
3rd Paris–Tours
3rd Primus Classic
4th Road race, UCI World Championships
4th Tour of Flanders
7th Overall Benelux Tour
7th Bretagne Classic
10th Dwars door Vlaanderen
2022
4th Gent–Wevelgem
7th Paris–Roubaix
9th Overall Danmark Rundt
9th Classic Brugge–De Panne
10th Omloop Het Nieuwsblad
2023
3rd Road race, National Championships
4th Overall Renewi Tour
5th Overall Tour of Belgium
6th Road race, UCI World Championships
7th Kampioenschap van Vlaanderen
10th Milan–San Remo
10th Kuurne–Brussels–Kuurne
2024
2nd E3 Saxo Classic
5th Overall Tour of Belgium
7th Omloop Het Nieuwsblad
8th Milan–San Remo
10th Kuurne–Brussels–Kuurne
Combativity award Stage 9 Tour de France
2025
5th Tour of Flanders
5th E3 Saxo Classic
9th Paris–Tours
10th Bretagne Classic
2026
2nd Paris–Tours
3rd Overall Tour of Britain
3rd Paris–Roubaix
6th Tour of Flanders
7th Milan–San Remo
10th Gent–Wevelgem

==== Grand Tour general classification results timeline ====
Grand Tour	2014	2015	2016	2017	2018	2019	2020	2021	2022	2023	2024	2025	2026
Giro d'Italia	—	—	—	98	—	—	—	—	—	—	92	—	70
Tour de France	—	—	99	—	63	43	71	39	80	79	61	62	71
Vuelta a España	88	DNF	—	—	—	—	—	—	—	—	—	—	—

==== Classics results timeline ====
Monument	2014	2015	2016	2017	2018	2019	2020	2021	2022	2023	2024	2025	2026
Milan–San Remo	—	—	—	39	10	79	—	1	—	10	8	23	7
Tour of Flanders	61	32	118	51	7	19	26	4	50	26	—	5	6
Paris–Roubaix	55	49	39	4	5	27	NH	25	7	20	—	95	3
Liège–Bastogne–Liège	Has not contested during his career												
Giro di Lombardia	—	—	DNF	—	—	—	—	—	—	—	—	—	—
Classic	2014	2015	2016	2017	2018	2019	2020	2021	2022	2023	2024	2025	2026
Omloop Het Nieuwsblad	—	—	9	8	4	40	1	83	10	58	7	48	—
Kuurne–Brussels–Kuurne	—	—	1	2	38	DNS	5	22	15	10	10	38	—
E3 Harelbeke	DNF	—	5	DNF	6	58	NH	14	15	50	2	5	16
Gent–Wevelgem	—	—	—	46	9	17	38	—	4	36	41	43	10
Dwars door Vlaanderen	33	—	20	—	10	14	NH	10	—	34	DNF	18	—
Bretagne Classic	—	—	47	DNF	—	—	—	7	—	—	49	10	31
Grand Prix Cycliste de Quebec	—	—	50	18	3	5	Not held		76	—	—	—	—
Grand Prix Cycliste de Montréal	—	—	12	14	14	29	Not held		62	—	—	—	—
Paris–Tours	37	101	—	—	—	—	—	3	—	37	—	9	2

==== Major championships timeline ====
Event		2014	2015	2016	2017	2018	2019	2020	2021	2022	2023	2024	2025
World Championships	Road race	—	—	24	89	—	—	DNF	4	47	6	DNF	—
European Championships	Road race	Did not exist		—	—	12	—	5	—	—	12	—	—
National Championships	Road race	6	—	DNF	3	3	23	55	8	63	3	17	63

Legend
—	Did not compete
DNF	Did not finish

=== Gravel ===
2023
1st UEC European Championships
1st National Championships
2024
4th UCI World Championships
