= 2018 Paris–Tours =

112th Paris–Tours
2018 UCI Europe Tour

Race details
- Dates: 7 October 2018
- Stages: 1
- Distance: 214.5 km (133.3 mi)
- Winning time: 4h 37' 55"

Results
	Winner	Søren Kragh Andersen (DEN)	(Team Sunweb)
	Second	Niki Terpstra (NED)	(Quick-Step Floors)
	Third	Benoît Cosnefroy (FRA)	(AG2R La Mondiale)

The 2018 Paris–Tours was the 112th edition of the Paris–Tours cycling classic. The race was held on 7 October 2018 as part of the 2018 UCI Europe Tour as a 1.HC-ranked event. Søren Kragh Andersen won in a time of 4h 37' 55" ahead of Niki Terpstra and Benoît Cosnefroy.

== Teams ==
Twenty-three teams of up to seven riders started the race.

UCI WorldTeams

- AG2R La Mondiale
- EF Education First–Drapac p/b Cannondale
- Groupama–FDJ
- Lotto–Soudal
- LottoNL–Jumbo
- Quick-Step Floors
- Team Dimension Data
- Team Katusha–Alpecin
- Team Sunweb

UCI Professional Continental Teams

- Cofidis
- Delko–Marseille Provence KTM
- Direct Énergie
- Euskadi–Murias
- Fortuneo–Samsic
- Israel Cycling Academy
- Roompot–Nederlandse Loterij
- Sport Vlaanderen–Baloise
- Vital Concept
- Wanty–Groupe Gobert
- WB Aqua Protect Veranclassic

UCI Continental Teams

- Roubaix–Lille Métropole
- St. Michel–Auber93

== Results ==
Result
Rank	Rider	Team	Time
1	Søren Kragh Andersen (DEN)	Team Sunweb	4h 37' 55"
2	Niki Terpstra (NED)	Quick-Step Floors	+ 25"
3	Benoît Cosnefroy (FRA)	AG2R La Mondiale	+ 25"
4	Oliver Naesen (BEL)	AG2R La Mondiale	+ 1' 14"
5	Valentin Madouas (FRA)	Groupama–FDJ	+ 1' 14"
6	Tiesj Benoot (BEL)	Lotto–Soudal	+ 1' 14"
7	Sep Vanmarcke (BEL)	EF Education First–Drapac p/b Cannondale	+ 1' 14"
8	Philippe Gilbert (BEL)	Quick-Step Floors	+ 1' 14"
9	Taco van der Hoorn (NED)	Roompot–Nederlandse Loterij	+ 1' 24"
10	Jos van Emden (NED)	LottoNL–Jumbo	+ 1' 24"
