= 2017 Paris–Tours =

111th Paris–Tours
2017 UCI Europe Tour

Race details
- Dates: 8 October 2017
- Stages: 1
- Distance: 234.5 km (145.7 mi)

Results
	Winner	Matteo Trentin (ITA)	(Quick-Step Floors)
	Second	Søren Kragh Andersen (DEN)	(Team Sunweb)
	Third	Niki Terpstra (NED)	(Quick-Step Floors)

The 111th edition of the Paris–Tours cycling classic was held on 8 October 2017. The race was part of the 2017 UCI Europe Tour, ranked as a 1.HC event. Matteo Trentin won in a time of 5hr22'51", two bike lengths ahead of Søren Kragh Andersen. Niki Terpstra was third.

== Route ==
The race started in Brou, 70 km west of Paris, and finished in Tours, in the center-west of France, after 234.5 km of racing.

== Result ==
Result
Rank	Rider	Team	Time
1	Matteo Trentin (ITA)	Quick-Step Floors	5h 22' 51"
2	Søren Kragh Andersen (DEN)	Team Sunweb	+ 0"
3	Niki Terpstra (NED)	Quick-Step Floors	+ 1"
4	André Greipel (GER)	Lotto Soudal	+ 7"
5	Maximiliano Richeze (ARG)	Quick-Step Floors	+ 7"
6	Oliver Naesen (BEL)	AG2R La Mondiale	+ 7"
7	Yves Lampaert (BEL)	Quick-Step Floors	+ 7"
8	Andrea Pasqualon (ITA)	Wanty - Groupe Gobert	+ 7"
9	Mike Teunissen (NED)	Team Sunweb	+ 7"
10	Jean-Pierre Drucker (LUX)	BMC Racing Team	+ 7"
