= 2018 Grote Prijs Jef Scherens =

2018 UCI Europe Tour

Race details
- Dates: 16 September 2018
- Stages: 1
- Distance: 185.7 km (115.4 mi)

Results
	Winner	Jasper Stuyven (BEL)	(Trek–Segafredo)
	Second	Jonas van Genechten (BEL)	(Vital Concept)
	Third	Timothy Dupont (BEL)	(Wanty–Groupe Gobert)

The 2018 Grote Prijs Jef Scherens was the 52nd edition of the Grote Prijs Jef Scherens road cycling one day race in and around Leuven. It was held on 16 September 2018 as a 1.1 categorised race and was part of the 2018 UCI Europe Tour and the 2018 Belgian Road Cycling Cup.

Leuven-born Jasper Stuyven won the group in a bunch sprint ahead of Jonas van Genechten and defending champion Timothy Dupont.

== Teams ==
Twenty-three teams were invited to take part in the race. These included three UCI WorldTeams, nine UCI Professional Continental teams and eleven UCI Continental teams.

UCI WorldTeams

- LottoNL–Jumbo
- Lotto–Soudal
- Trek–Segafredo

UCI Professional Continental Teams

- Fortuneo–Samsic
- Hagens Berman Axeon
- Israel Cycling Academy
- Roompot–Nederlandse Loterij
- Sport Vlaanderen–Baloise
- Vérandas Willems–Crelan
- Vital Concept
- Wanty–Groupe Gobert
- WB Aqua Protect Veranclassic

UCI Continental Teams

- BEAT Cycling Club
- Cibel–Cebon
- Joker Icopal
- Leopard Pro Cycling
- Lviv Cycling Team
- SEG Racing Academy
- St. Michel–Auber93
- T.Palm–Pôle Continental Wallon
- Tarteletto–Isorex
- Team Coop
- Team Sauerland NRW p/b SKS Germany

== Result ==
Result
Rank	Rider	Team	Time
1	Jasper Stuyven (BEL)	Trek–Segafredo	4h 16' 54"
2	Jonas van Genechten (BEL)	Vital Concept	s.t.
3	Timothy Dupont (BEL)	Wanty–Groupe Gobert	s.t.
4	Jens Debusschere (BEL)	Lotto–Soudal	s.t.
5	Aksel Nõmmela (EST)	BEAT Cycling Club	s.t.
6	Jasper Philipsen (BEL)	Hagens Berman Axeon	s.t.
7	Toms Skujiņš (LAT)	Trek–Segafredo	s.t.
8	Markus Hoelgaard (NOR)	Joker Icopal	s.t.
9	Alexander Krieger (GER)	Trek–Segafredo	s.t.
10	Sean De Bie (BEL)	Vérandas Willems–Crelan	s.t.
