= 2024 Omloop Het Nieuwsblad =

Bicycle race

2024 UCI World Tour, race 4 of 35
- Event poster with previous winners Lotte Kopecky and Dylan van Baarle

Race details
- Dates: 24 February 2024
- Stages: 1
- Distance: 202.2 km (125.6 mi)

Results
	Winner	Jan Tratnik (SLO)	(Visma–Lease a Bike)
	Second	Nils Politt (GER)	(UAE Team Emirates)
	Third	Wout van Aert (BEL)	(Visma–Lease a Bike)

The 2024 Omloop Het Nieuwsblad was a road cycling one-day race that took place on 24 February in Belgium, starting in Gent and finishing in Ninove. It was the 79th edition of the Omloop Het Nieuwsblad and the fourth event of the 2024 UCI World Tour. Jan Tratnik won the race from a two-man breakaway alongside Nils Politt. Tratnik's teammate Wout van Aert won the sprint for third from the chase group consisting of 32 riders.

== Route ==
The 2024 edition marked the exhilarating start to the spring Classics season, featuring a 202.2km course commencing at the 't Kuipke velodrome in Ghent. The route, slightly shortened from the previous year, showcased 12 climbs and nine cobbled sectors, strategically placed in the latter half.

The race kicked off with challenges like the cobbles of Haaghoek and the Leberg climb within the first 50km. A 48km stretch without major obstacles followed, leading to the Lange Munte cobbles at the halfway point. As the peloton passed Oudenaarde at 99.7km, the intensity heightened with rapid successions of climbs, including Kattenberg, Leberg, Valkenberg, Wolvenberg, Molenberg, and Berendries.

The decisive phase unfolded after 186.5km, as riders faced the iconic Muur van Geraardsbergen, followed by the Bosberg climb at 190.4km. The finish line in Ninove remained unchanged from the previous year, located on the wider, slightly uphill Elisabethlaan.

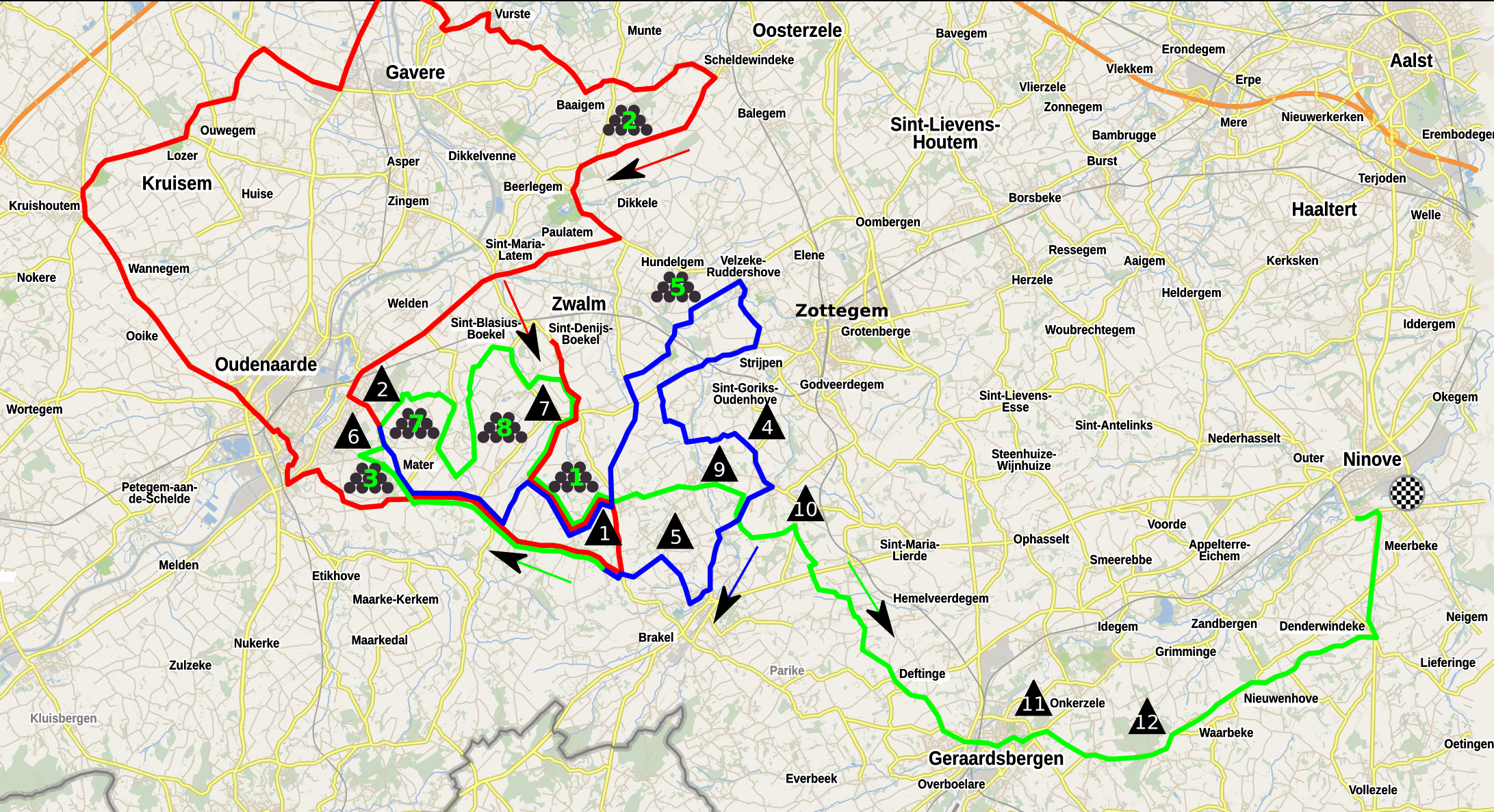
Final part of 2024 Omloop Het Nieuwsblad

== Teams ==
Twenty-five teams participated in the race, including all eighteen UCI WorldTeams and seven UCI ProTeams. In total, 175 riders started the race.

UCI WorldTeams

- Alpecin–Deceuninck
- Arkéa–B&B Hotels
- Astana Qazaqstan Team
- Bora–Hansgrohe
- Cofidis
- Decathlon–AG2R La Mondiale
- EF Education–EasyPost
- Groupama–FDJ
- INEOS Grenadiers
- Intermarché–Wanty
- Lidl–Trek
- Movistar Team
- Soudal–Quick-Step
- Team Bahrain Victorious
- Team dsm–firmenich PostNL
- Team Jayco–AlUla
- Visma–Lease a Bike
- UAE Team Emirates

UCI ProSeries Teams

- Bingoal WB
- Israel–Premier Tech
- Lotto–Dstny
- Q36.5 Pro Cycling Team
- Team Flanders–Baloise
- Tudor Pro Cycling Team
- Uno-X Mobility

== Summary ==
The 2024 Omloop Het Nieuwsblad unfolded with all eyes on Wout van Aert and his Visma–Lease a Bike dream team, including Christophe Laporte, Tiesj Benoot, and new addition Matteo Jorgenson. Contrary to expectations, the Dutch squad allowed a breakaway of nine riders to establish a lead of 4:40 before the cobbled sectors at Haaghoek.

As the race progressed, the Visma–Lease a Bike team took control in the second hour, splitting the peloton and forming a decisive group of 30 riders. Matteo Jorgenson's relentless pace on the Wolvenberg dwindled the front group to six, featuring Van Aert, Laporte, Moscon, De Lie, Pidcock, and Skujiņš. Despite chasing efforts, the trio from Visma–Lease a Bike maintained their lead, with Toms Skujiņš briefly attempting a solo move.

With 21km remaining, Matteo Jorgenson launched a decisive attack, creating a gap that ultimately secured the Visma–Lease a Bike victory in Meerbeke. The teams' dominance, coupled with the falls of Kasper Asgreen and Julian Alaphilippe from Soudal–Quick-Step, marked a start to the Classics season and showcased their strength in the race. The unexpected twists and turns added an element of suspense, but the Visma–Lease a Bike team navigated to the win.

== Result ==
Result
Rank	Rider	Team	Time
1	Jan Tratnik (SLO)	Visma–Lease a Bike	4h 31' 28"
2	Nils Politt (GER)	UAE Team Emirates	+ 3"
3	Wout Van Aert (BEL)	Visma–Lease a Bike	+ 8"
4	Oliver Naesen (BEL)	Decathlon–AG2R La Mondiale	+ 8"
5	Christophe Laporte (FRA)	Visma–Lease a Bike	+ 8"
6	Laurenz Rex (BEL)	Intermarché–Wanty	+ 8"
7	Jasper Stuyven (BEL)	Lidl–Trek	+ 8"
8	Tom Pidcock (GBR)	INEOS Grenadiers	+ 8"
9	Matteo Trentin (ITA)	Tudor Pro Cycling Team	+ 8"
10	Arnaud De Lie (BEL)	Lotto–Dstny	+ 8"
