= 2021 Paris–Tours =

- 2021 UCI Europe Tour; 2021 UCI ProSeries

Race details
- Dates: 10 October 2021
- Stages: 1
- Distance: 212.3 km (131.9 mi)
- Winning time: 4h 33' 07"

Results
	Winner	Arnaud Démare (FRA)	(Groupama–FDJ)
	Second	Franck Bonnamour (FRA)	(B&B Hotels p/b KTM)
	Third	Jasper Stuyven (BEL)	(Trek–Segafredo)

The 2021 Paris–Tours was the 115th edition of the Paris–Tours road cycling classic. It was held on 10 October 2021 as part of the 2021 UCI Europe Tour and the 2021 UCI ProSeries calendars.

The race took place in the Centre-Val de Loire region of central France. Despite its name, the race departed from Chartres, about 90 kilometres (56 mi) southwest of Paris, for the fourth consecutive edition, having first done so in the 2009 edition. The first 160 kilometres (99 mi) of the 212.3-kilometre (131.9 mi) route, which headed net southwest, were slightly undulating and led into the most impactful part of the race, which had nine unpaved sectors totalling 9.5 kilometres (5.9 mi) and seven short hills packed into the final 51 kilometres (32 mi). The last of these obstacles, the Côte de Rochecorbon, crested with just over 10 kilometres (6.2 mi) to go before a flat run-in to the finish city of Tours, with the finish line on the Avenue de Grammont.

== Teams ==
10 of the 19 UCI WorldTeams, 10 UCI ProTeams, and two UCI Continental teams made up the 22 teams that participated in the race. Bora–Hansgrohe, with six riders, was the only team to not enter a full squad of seven riders, though St. Michel–Auber93 and Xelliss–Roubaix–Lille Métropole were also reduced to six riders after both teams had one non-starter each. Of the 151 riders who started the race, 117 finished.

UCI WorldTeams

- AG2R Citroën Team
- Bora–Hansgrohe
- Cofidis
- Groupama–FDJ
- Intermarché–Wanty–Gobert Matériaux
- Israel Start-Up Nation
- Lotto–Soudal
- Team DSM
- Team Jumbo–Visma
- Trek–Segafredo

UCI ProTeams

- Alpecin–Fenix
- Arkéa–Samsic
- B&B Hotels p/b KTM
- Bingoal Pauwels Sauces WB
- Delko
- Equipo Kern Pharma
- Euskaltel–Euskadi
- Sport Vlaanderen–Baloise
- Team TotalEnergies
- Uno-X Pro Cycling Team

UCI Continental Teams

- St. Michel–Auber93
- Xelliss–Roubaix–Lille Métropole

== Result ==
Result
Rank	Rider	Team	Time
1	Arnaud Démare (FRA)	Groupama–FDJ	4h 33' 07"
2	Franck Bonnamour (FRA)	B&B Hotels p/b KTM	+ 0"
3	Jasper Stuyven (BEL)	Trek–Segafredo	+ 0"
4	Stan Dewulf (BEL)	AG2R Citroën Team	+ 3"
5	Danny van Poppel (NED)	Intermarché–Wanty–Gobert Matériaux	+ 40"
6	Bryan Coquard (FRA)	B&B Hotels p/b KTM	+ 40"
7	Arne Marit (BEL)	Sport Vlaanderen–Baloise	+ 40"
8	Andrea Pasqualon (ITA)	Intermarché–Wanty–Gobert Matériaux	+ 40"
9	Julien Trarieux (FRA)	Delko	+ 40"
10	Amaury Capiot (BEL)	Arkéa–Samsic	+ 40"
