= 2021 Milan–San Remo =

Italian one-day cycling race

2021 UCI World Tour, race 6 of 29
- Official event poster

Race details
- Dates: 20 March 2021
- Stages: 1
- Distance: 299 km (186 mi)
- Winning time: 6h 38' 06"

Results
	Winner	Jasper Stuyven (BEL)	(Trek–Segafredo)
	Second	Caleb Ewan (AUS)	(Lotto–Soudal)
	Third	Wout van Aert (BEL)	(Team Jumbo–Visma)

The 2021 Milan–San Remo (known as Milano–Sanremo presented by EOLO for sponsorship reasons) was a road cycling one-day race that took place on 20 March 2021 in northwestern Italy. It was the 112th edition of the Milan–San Remo cycling classic. Originally the eighth event on the 2021 UCI World Tour calendar, it became the sixth event after the cancellation of the Tour Down Under and the Cadel Evans Great Ocean Road Race.

After the COVID-19 pandemic forced several alterations to the 2020 edition, the race returned both to its usual mid-March slot and to a more traditional route. The 299-kilometre (186 mi) long race in northwestern Italy started from the Lombardian capital of Milan. The course featured several hills, the last of which was the Poggio di San Remo in the final 10 kilometres (6.2 mi), before a flat finish on the Via Roma in Sanremo on the Mediterranean coast of Liguria.

As the peloton approached the summit of the Poggio, several attacks resulted in a select group being formed that contained many of the pre-race favourites, including the main three of defending champion Wout van Aert (Team Jumbo–Visma), 2019 winner Julian Alaphilippe (Deceuninck–Quick-Step), and Mathieu van der Poel (Alpecin–Fenix). In the final three kilometres, Jasper Stuyven (Trek–Segafredo) launched a late attack at the bottom of the descent of the Poggio and held off the rest of the favourites to win his first monument and become the second consecutive Belgian winner of the race. Caleb Ewan (Lotto–Soudal) won the bunch sprint for second ahead of van Aert in third.

== Teams ==
All nineteen UCI WorldTeams and the top two UCI ProTeams from the 2020 season, Alpecin–Fenix and Arkéa–Samsic, were automatically invited. Four additional UCI ProTeams received wild card invitations to make up the twenty-five teams that participated in the race. Each team entered seven riders, for a total of 175 riders who took part in the race. From this field, there were 169 finishers and three non-starters.

UCI WorldTeams

- AG2R Citroën Team
- Astana–Premier Tech
- Bora–Hansgrohe
- Cofidis
- Deceuninck–Quick-Step
- EF Education–Nippo
- Groupama–FDJ
- INEOS Grenadiers
- Intermarché–Wanty–Gobert Matériaux
- Israel Start-Up Nation
- Lotto–Soudal
- Movistar Team
- Team Bahrain Victorious
- Team BikeExchange
- Team DSM
- Team Jumbo–Visma
- Team Qhubeka Assos
- Trek–Segafredo
- UAE Team Emirates

UCI ProTeams

- Alpecin–Fenix
- Androni Giocattoli–Sidermec
- Arkéa–Samsic
- Bardiani–CSF–Faizanè
- Team Novo Nordisk
- Total Direct Énergie

== Pre-race favourites ==
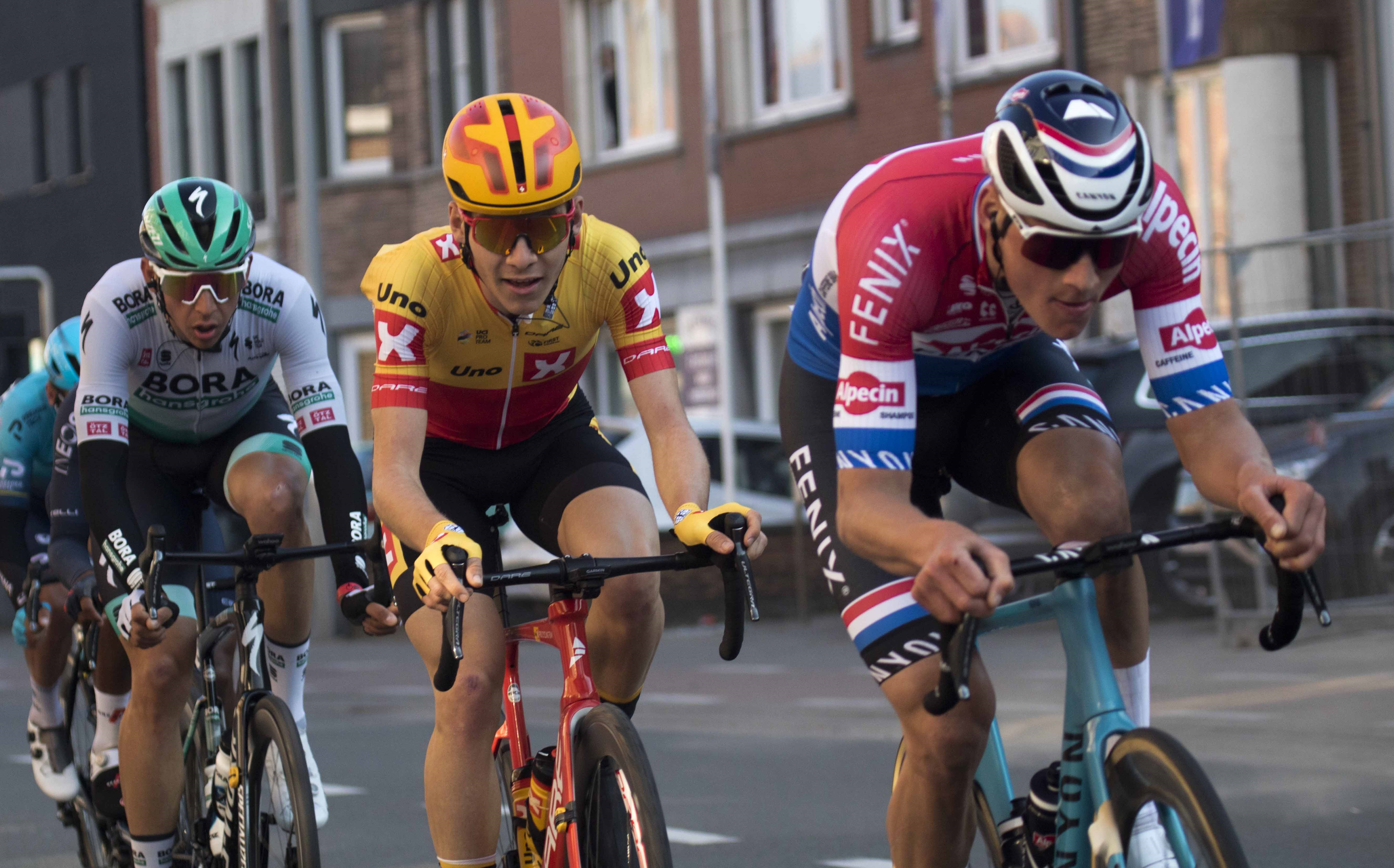
Mathieu van der Poel (right) at the 2021 Kuurne–Brussels–Kuurne

The trio of World Road Race Champion Julian Alaphilippe (Deceuninck–Quick-Step), defending champion Wout van Aert (Team Jumbo–Visma), and Mathieu van der Poel (Alpecin–Fenix) came into the race as the main favourites, especially given their runs of excellent form in the build-up to the event. All three had won stages at Tirreno–Adriatico, which had finished just four days prior, with Alaphilippe winning one stage and the other two winning two each. Additionally, van der Poel had won the Strade Bianche just ahead of Alaphilippe, with van Aert finishing fourth. Especially for the former two riders, their history of high placings in this race further contributed to their statuses as favourites. In 2019, Alaphilippe improved from a close third-place finish in 2017 to win, while van Aert finished sixth on his first attempt. In the 2020 edition, van Aert had outsprinted Alaphilippe for the win, while debutant van der Poel finished 13th.

The winners of the last seven editions of the race, dating back to 2014, all participated. These were, in order from earliest to latest, Alexander Kristoff (UAE Team Emirates), John Degenkolb (Lotto–Soudal), Arnaud Démare (Groupama–FDJ), Michał Kwiatkowski (INEOS Grenadiers), Vincenzo Nibali (Trek–Segafredo), and the aforementioned two most recent winners. Of the first five, only Démare was the outright leader or contender on his team, while Kwiatkowski was favoured the most among the rest, some of whom were expected to share leadership with or were working for a teammate.

From the rest of the participant list, there were several other notable contenders, many of whom had recorded top ten results in previous editions. These included Oliver Naesen and Greg Van Avermaet (AG2R Citroën Team), Peter Sagan and Maximilian Schachmann (Bora–Hansgrohe), Davide Ballerini and Sam Bennett (Deceuninck–Quick-Step), neo-pro (Note: A neo-pro, similar to a rookie, is a cyclist, usually under the age of 25, who is competing for a UCI WorldTeam or a UCI ProTeam in their first professional year of their career.) Tom Pidcock (INEOS Grenadiers), Caleb Ewan and Philippe Gilbert (Lotto–Soudal), Sonny Colbrelli and Matej Mohorič (Team Bahrain Victorious), Michael Matthews (Team BikeExchange), Giacomo Nizzolo (Team Qhubeka Assos), Jasper Stuyven (Trek–Segafredo), and Matteo Trentin (UAE Team Emirates). Schachmann and Bennett carried good form from Paris–Nice, in which the former won the overall race and the latter won two stages. Sagan, a three-time World Road Race Champion, hoped to finally get on the top step of the podium after having finished no worse than 17th in ten prior attempts; these also included two runner-ups and six further top tens. However, Sagan came into the race still recovering from COVID-19, having spent three weeks in quarantine in February after testing positive for the virus. Meanwhile, Gilbert, in the twilight of his career, hoped to finally win in sixteen attempts, which included five top tens and a pair of third places. Had he done so, he would have become only the fourth rider in history to win all five monument classics, joining fellow Belgians Roger De Vlaeminck, Eddy Merckx, and Rik Van Looy.

== Route ==
As one of road cycling's five monument classics, Milan–San Remo – generally considered to be a sprinters' classic – is among the highest-rated races in professional cycling. The 2020 edition, which had been postponed to early August due to the COVID-19 pandemic in Italy, was forced to undergo several route changes, as local government officials of several coastal towns wanted to keep roads open during the tourist season. The return to its usual late March date saw the 2021 edition return to a more traditional route, with the Tre Capi – the Capo Mele, the Capo Cervo, and the Capo Berta – returning after a one-year absence. Despite that, the Passo del Turchino was still kept off the route, as a landslide in October 2019 rendered the road over the climb impassable and repairs were expected to continue until April 2021. In its place, race organizers added the gentler Colle del Giovo, which last featured in 2002 and whose summit at 518 metres (1,699 ft) is the highest point in the race, though its appearance at around 130 kilometres (81 mi) from the finish was not expected to be a major inflection point.

The race began with its traditional start in Milan, the capital of the Italian region of Lombardy. It headed in a south-southwest direction through Lombardy and southeast Piedmont towards the coast, passing through Pavia, Tortona, and Acqui Terme. From there, the race headed south into Liguria, passing over the Colle del Giovo on its way to the Ligurian coast along the Mediterranean Sea, which it reached with 112 kilometres (70 mi) left. The race continued west along the coast through Savona before tackling the Tre Capi, starting at just over 50 kilometres (31 mi) from the finish and ending around 14 kilometres (8.7 mi) later. With 28 kilometres (17 mi) left, the race reached the foot of the Cipressa climb, which is 6 kilometres (3.7 mi) long and is where the race traditionally begins to heat up. In the final 10 kilometres (6.2 mi), the pivotal Poggio di San Remo climb was the final hurdle and is a common launching point for race-winning attacks. From its summit at 5.7 kilometres (3.5 mi) left, riders faced a short but technical descent before a flat run-in to the finishing straight on the Via Roma in Sanremo after 299 kilometres (186 mi) of racing.

== Race report ==
The temperature at the start was 6 °C (43 °F), and sunny skies and easterly tailwinds forecast by weather reports were expected to make for a faster race than usual. Of the 175 riders registered for the race, three did not start. The race rolled out at 9:50 local time (CET) along the banks of the Naviglio Pavese canal in Milan, and after a short neutral zone, the flag drop from race director Stefano Allocchio at 10:00 signaled the official start of the race. In the opening kilometres, the day's main breakaway was formed, spearheaded by attacks from UCI ProTeam Team Novo Nordisk. The octet was made up of Filippo Tagliani and Mattia Viel (Androni Giocattoli–Sidermec), Alessandro Tonelli (Bardiani–CSF–Faizanè), Taco van der Hoorn (Intermarché–Wanty–Gobert Matériaux), Mathias Norsgaard (Movistar Team), Andrea Peron and Charles Planet (Team Novo Nordisk), and Nicola Conci (Trek–Segafredo). Of this group, Peron, Planet, and Tonelli had featured in several breakaways in previous editions. The peloton let them increase their advantage to a maximum of nearly eight minutes in the first 30 kilometres (19 mi) before beginning to gradually close the gap.

With around 50 kilometres (31 mi) to go, the breakaway's numbers were cut in half on the slopes of the Capo Mele and the Capo Cervo, as both pairs of Androni Giocattoli–Sidermec and Team Novo Nordisk riders were dropped. In the run-in to the Cipressa climb, Tonelli and van der Hoorn made separate attacks to try and extend their time out front, but before the top of the climb, the remaining breakaway riders had been caught by the peloton. At that point, several teams began to jockey for position at the front of the bunch as they approached the Poggio, the pivotal final climb. On the Poggio, INEOS Grenadiers took to the front, with World Time Trial Champion Filippo Ganna setting a fast pace to discourage any attacks and to drop some of the sprinters that would have been contenders for the victory.

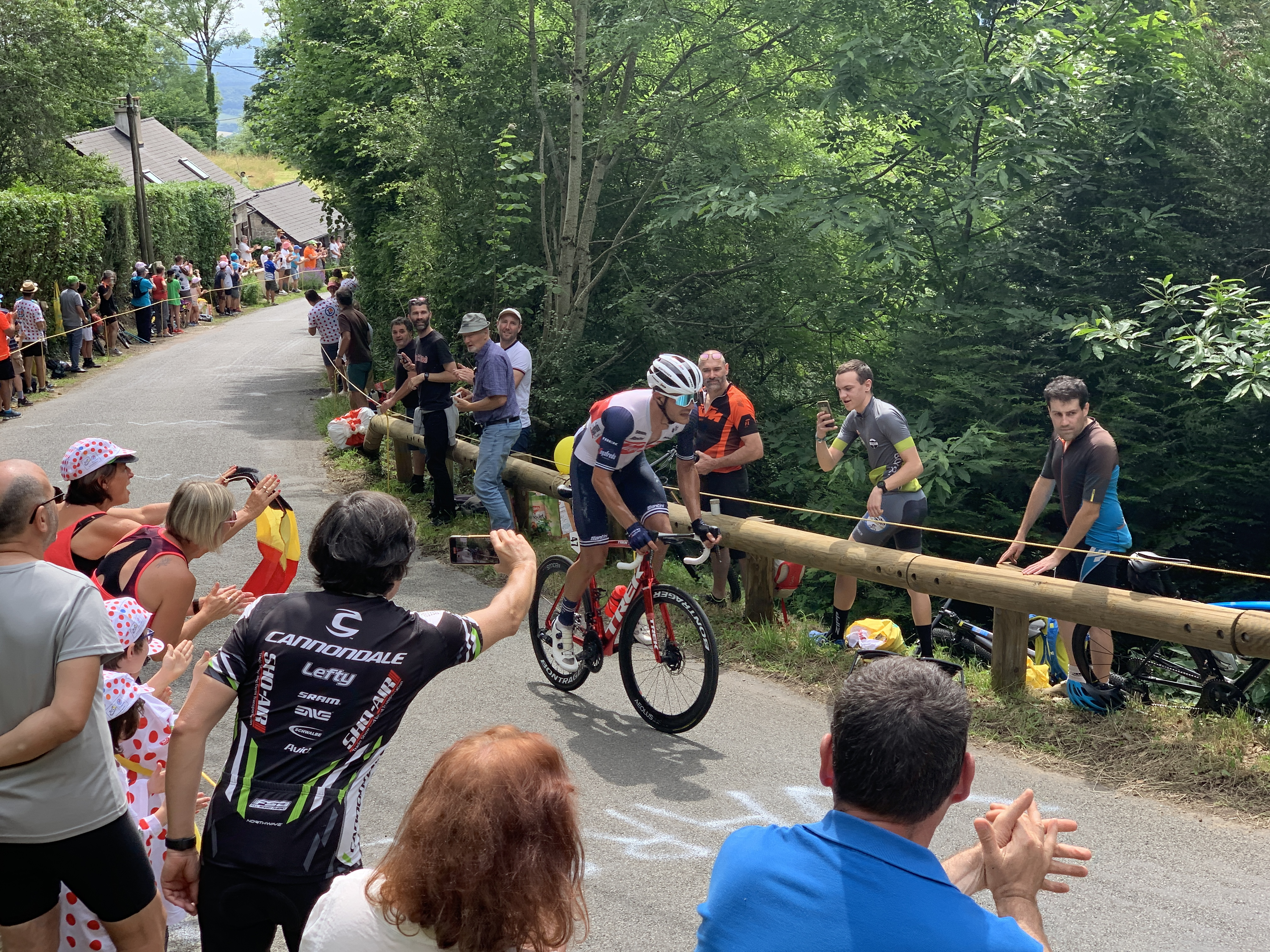
Race winner Jasper Stuyven, pictured here on Stage 7 of the 2021 Tour de France

About a kilometre from the top of the Poggio, Julian Alaphilippe attacked for the third straight year. Wout van Aert quickly got on his wheel while the others behind exerted themselves to catch up. This resulted in a select group of eleven riders forming that included many of the pre-race favourites. On the twisty, technical descent, several more riders would catch up. Loïc Vliegen (Intermarché–Wanty–Gobert Matériaux) took a turn too wide and crashed into a safety barrier on the side of the road; he was unharmed and was able to continue riding. At the bottom of the descent, Jasper Stuyven accelerated off the front of the group with around 3 kilometres (1.9 mi) left. Behind, several riders, including Tom Pidcock and Maximilian Schachmann, each made attempts to give chase while the rest of the group did not react, as no one had any supporting teammates and most were trying to conserve energy for the finale. With just over a kilometre to go, Søren Kragh Andersen (Team DSM) attacked and bridged the gap to Stuyven. On the finishing straight on the Via Roma, with the group closing the gap to the lead duo, Stuyven sprinted out of Kragh Andersen's slipstream. He was unable to keep sprinting and sat back down, but with his gap, he managed to hold on at the finish line to take his first monument victory. Behind him, Caleb Ewan won the sprint for second ahead of van Aert to complete the podium. Some key favourites including Peter Sagan, Mathieu van der Poel, Michael Matthews, and Sonny Colbrelli were among the top ten finishers, as was Kragh Andersen, who held on for ninth, while other favourites including Matej Mohorič, Matteo Trentin, Greg Van Avermaet, Schachmann, Pidcock, Alaphilippe, and Michał Kwiatkowski in the lead group completed the top 17.

Of the rest of the peloton, up to 55th-place finished within a minute of Stuyven. At the back end of the field, the last group on the road, which included breakaway members Peron, Planet, and Tagliani, finished 19' 37" down. There were three riders who did not finish.

== Result ==
Result (1–10) (Note: Top 10 out of 169 finishers shown)
Rank	Rider	Team	Time
1	Jasper Stuyven (BEL)	Trek–Segafredo	6h 36' 06"
2	Caleb Ewan (AUS)	Lotto–Soudal	+ 0"
3	Wout van Aert (BEL)	Team Jumbo–Visma	+ 0"
4	Peter Sagan (SVK)	Bora–Hansgrohe	+ 0"
5	Mathieu van der Poel (NED)	Alpecin–Fenix	+ 0"
6	Michael Matthews (AUS)	Team BikeExchange	+ 0"
7	Alex Aranburu (ESP)	Astana–Premier Tech	+ 0"
8	Sonny Colbrelli (ITA)	Team Bahrain Victorious	+ 0"
9	Søren Kragh Andersen (DEN)	Team DSM	+ 0"
10	Anthony Turgis (FRA)	Total Direct Énergie	+ 0"

== Post-race ==
In his post-race interview, Jasper Stuyven discussed his endgame strategy and reflected on his win. He knew if the race came down to a straight sprint, there were plenty of faster riders that would have beaten him, so he "instinctively decided to attack, throwing caution to the wind, but knowing the big three might just watch each other and the sprinters in the group, like Caleb Ewan, allowing him to stay away." On his underdog victory and upsetting the three main favourites, Stuyven remarked, "Those three are the strongest riders in the world in virtually every kind of race, but I showed today that if you believe in it, you can achieve great things ... Nobody is unbeatable." After finishing second in 2018 behind Vincenzo Nibali in similar circumstances, Caleb Ewan expressed disappointment at coming up just short this time around. He noted that he had specifically targeted this race and had trained extensively on the Poggio to be able to keep up with the attacks so that he could be there at the end to contest for the victory. His training efforts initially seemed to have paid off, as Ewan was near the front the whole time up the Poggio and was able to follow van Aert's and Alaphilippe's attacks comfortably. However, on the hesitation in the group after Stuyven's attack, he commented that "it would have been nice to have one guy there to keep it together, because I know if that group's together, then usually I'm the fastest guy there," but since "nobody was willing to tow them [Alaphilippe, van Aert, and van der Poel] to the line ... we waited too long."

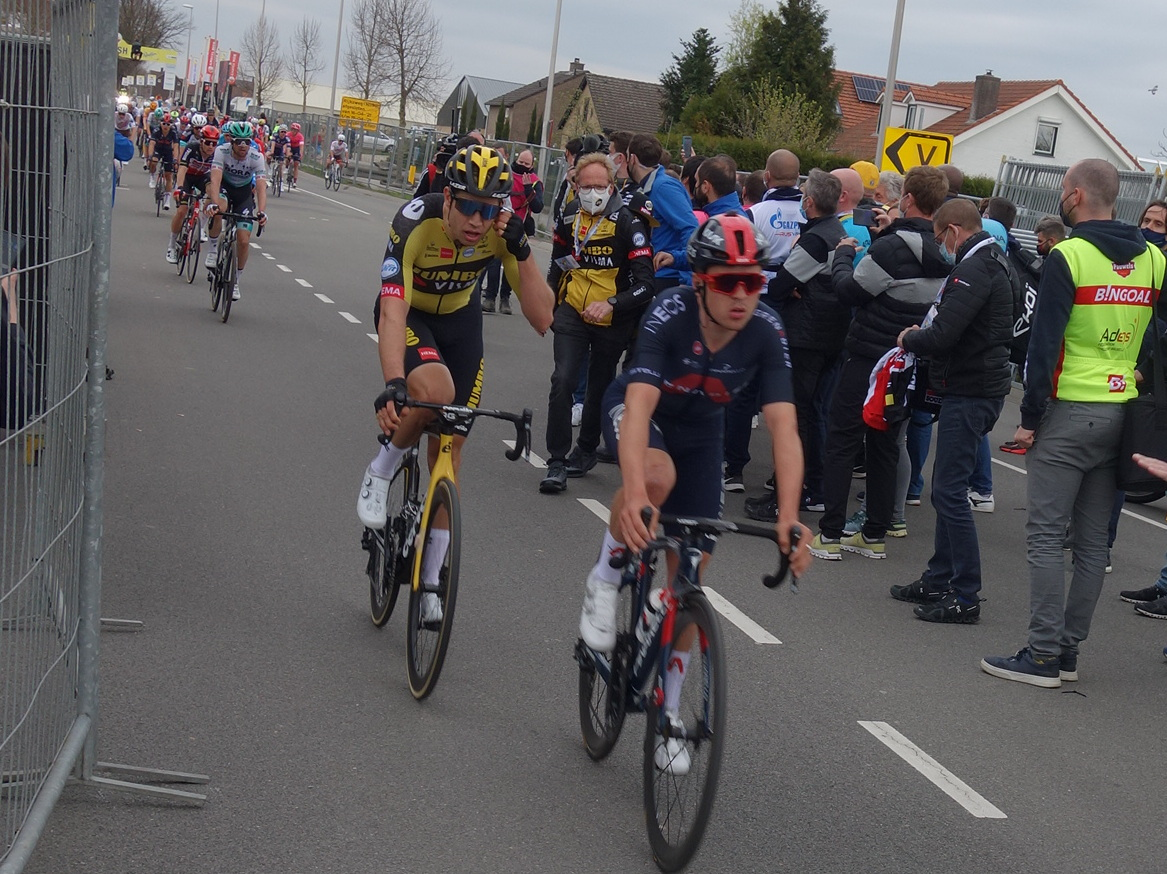
Wout van Aert (foreground, left) and Tom Pidcock (foreground, right), after the finish of the 2021 Amstel Gold Race

Ewan's sentiments were echoed by Wout van Aert and Mathieu van der Poel, but the defending champion seemed to be less disappointed with his respective result. In their post-race interviews, both riders admitted that they had made some incorrect decisions by gambling wrong and not being aggressive enough. Like Ewan, both riders would have been more favoured for the sprint, so when they were without any teammates to chase down Stuyven in the finale, they chose to conserve their energy. When he was asked about his attack on the Poggio, van Aert admitted that he did not expect as many riders to still be keeping up. In van der Poel's case, though he had been near the back of the peloton on the Poggio, he was able to keep up with the accelerations. However, he found himself too far back to react when Stuyven went off the front, noting that "Jasper chose the right moment and was strong enough to hold it until the finish line. That makes him the deserved winner today."

For Julian Alaphilippe and Peter Sagan, there were mixed feelings about their respective performances. Co-leader Sam Bennett had not been feeling sharp, so Alaphilippe became his team's best chance of winning. For the third straight year, he attacked on the Poggio, but this time, his efforts were not as effective as in years past. Alaphilippe said that the group was so stretched out on the descent that he was too far back to see or react to the Stuyven's surge. As a result, he went all-in for the sprint, launching from 200 metres out, but "with all the fast guys there, [he] couldn't do much more." He eventually faded to 16th, though with no regrets, adding that "I obviously tried to win, but it doesn't work out every time." For his part, Sagan characterized his performance as "bittersweet," elaborating that he was satisfied to be "feeling better and [his] form [was] gradually improving," but he rued "[missing] the chance to get a victory."

Apart from Stuyven, one rider who was comparatively happy with his result was 21-year-old Tom Pidcock, who came into the race second in the INEOS Grenadiers pecking order behind Michał Kwiatkowski. Despite his preparation being slightly hampered by knee tendonitis, Pidcock said that he felt really good in his first monument race, having even put an attack on the descent of the Poggio. On finishing with the lead group, Pidcock remarked that "[he] wasn’t really supposed to be there in the final," and although neither he nor Kwiatkowski placed in the top ten, he still came away satisfied.
