= 2016 Bretagne Classic Ouest-France =

2016 Bretagne Classic Ouest–France
2016 UCI World Tour

Race details
- Dates: 28 August 2016
- Stages: 1
- Winning time: 5h 58' 46"

Results
	Winner	Oliver Naesen (BEL)	(IAM Cycling)
	Second	Alberto Bettiol (ITA)	(Cannondale–Drapac)
	Third	Alexander Kristoff (NOR)	(Team Katusha)

The 2016 Bretagne Classic Ouest–France was the 80th edition of the former GP Ouest–France road bicycle race, now known as the Bretagne Classic. The race took place on 28 August 2016.

== Teams ==
The eighteen UCI World Tour teams are automatically entitled and obliged to start the race. The race organisation will still hand out a few wildcards to some UCI Professional Continental teams.

World Tour teams

- AG2R La Mondiale
- Astana
- BMC Racing Team
- Team Dimension Data
- Etixx–Quick-Step
- FDJ
- IAM Cycling
- Lampre–Merida
- Lotto–Soudal
- Movistar Team
- Team Giant–Alpecin
- Team Katusha
- LottoNL–Jumbo
- Team Sky
- Tinkoff
- Trek–Segafredo
- Cannondale–Drapac
- Orica–BikeExchange

== Result ==
Rank	Rider	Team	Time
1	Oliver Naesen (BEL)	IAM Cycling	5hr 58' 46"
2	Alberto Bettiol (ITA)	Cannondale–Drapac	+ 2"
3	Alexander Kristoff (NOR)	Team Katusha	+ 5"
4	Michael Matthews (AUS)	Orica–BikeExchange	+ 5"
5	John Degenkolb (GER)	Team Giant–Alpecin	+ 5"
6	Maciej Paterski (POL)	CCC–Sprandi–Polkowice	+ 5"
7	Daniel Hoelgaard (NOR)	FDJ	+ 5"
8	Giacomo Nizzolo (ITA)	Trek–Segafredo	+ 5"
9	Matteo Trentin (ITA)	Etixx–Quick-Step	+ 5"
10	Edvald Boasson Hagen (NOR)	Team Dimension Data	+ 5"
