= 2020 Kuurne–Brussels–Kuurne =

2020 UCI Europe Tour 2020 UCI ProSeries

Race details
- Dates: 1 March 2020
- Stages: 1
- Distance: 201.0 km (124.9 mi)
- Winning time: 4h 47' 18"

Results
	Winner	Kasper Asgreen (DEN)	(Deceuninck–Quick-Step)
	Second	Giacomo Nizzolo (ITA)	(NTT Pro Cycling)
	Third	Alexander Kristoff (NOR)	(UAE Team Emirates)

The 72nd edition of the Kuurne–Brussels–Kuurne cycling classic was held on 1 March 2020. It is part of the 2020 UCI Europe Tour and ranked as a UCI ProSeries event. The route was 201.0 km (125 mi), starting and finishing in Kuurne. It is the second and concluding race of the Belgian opening weekend, the year's first road races in Northwestern Europe, one day after Omloop Het Nieuwsblad.

== Teams ==
Twenty-five teams were invited to start the race. These included eighteen UCI WorldTeams and seven UCI Professional Continental teams.

UCI WorldTeams

- AG2R La Mondiale
- Astana
- Bahrain–McLaren
- Bora–Hansgrohe
- CCC Team
- Cofidis
- Deceuninck–Quick-Step
- Groupama–FDJ
- Israel Start-Up Nation
- Lotto–Soudal
- Mitchelton–Scott
- Movistar Team
- NTT Pro Cycling
- Team Ineos
- Team Sunweb
- Trek–Segafredo
- UAE Team Emirates

UCI Professional Continental teams

- Alpecin–Fenix
- Bingoal–Wallonie Bruxelles
- B&B Hotels–Vital Concept
- Circus–Wanty Gobert
- Sport Vlaanderen–Baloise
- Total Direct Énergie
- Uno-X Norwegian Development Team

== Results ==
Result
Rank	Rider	Team	Time
1	Kasper Asgreen (DEN)	Deceuninck–Quick-Step	4h 47' 18"
2	Giacomo Nizzolo (ITA)	NTT Pro Cycling	+ 3"
3	Alexander Kristoff (NOR)	UAE Team Emirates	+ 3"
4	Fabio Jakobsen (NED)	Deceuninck–Quick-Step	+ 3"
5	Jasper Stuyven (BEL)	Trek–Segafredo	+ 3"
6	Hugo Hofstetter (FRA)	Israel Start-Up Nation	+ 3"
7	Sonny Colbrelli (ITA)	Bahrain–McLaren	+ 3"
8	Ben Swift (GBR)	Team Ineos	+ 3"
9	Dries Van Gestel (BEL)	Total Direct Énergie	+ 3"
10	Jürgen Roelandts (BEL)	Movistar Team	+ 3"
