= 2023 Kuurne–Brussels–Kuurne =

2023 UCI ProSeries

Race details
- Dates: 26 February 2023
- Stages: 1
- Distance: 193.1 km (120.0 mi)
- Winning time: 4h 32' 25"

Results
	Winner	Tiesj Benoot (BEL)	(Team Jumbo–Visma)
	Second	Nathan Van Hooydonck (BEL)	(Team Jumbo–Visma)
	Third	Matej Mohorič (SLO)	(Team Bahrain Victorious)

The 2023 Kuurne–Brussels–Kuurne was the 75th edition of the Kuurne–Brussels–Kuurne cycling classic. It was held on 26 February 2023 as a category 1.Pro race on the 2023 UCI ProSeries.

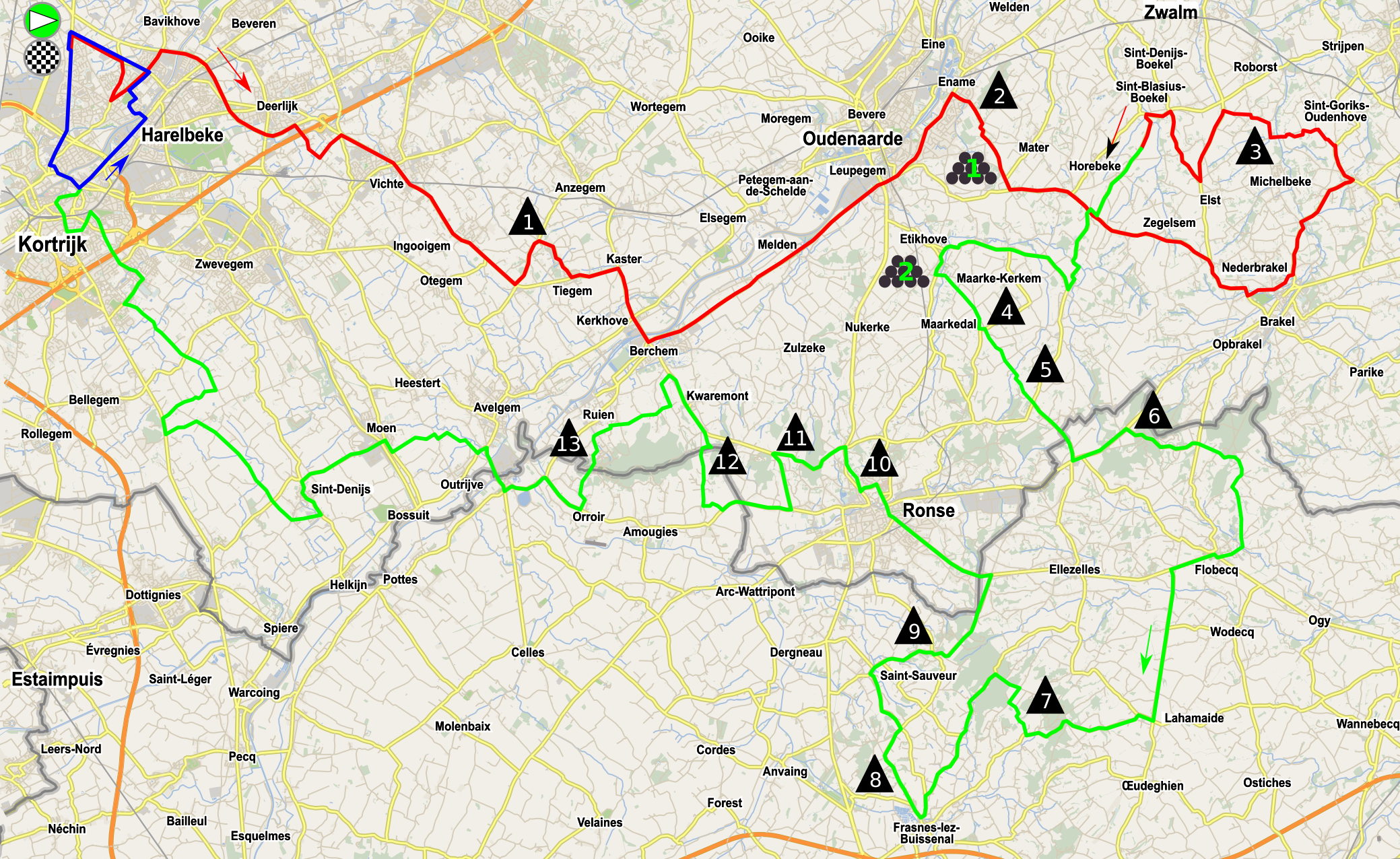
Map of 2023 Kuurne–Brussels–Kuurne

== Teams ==
Seventeen of the eighteen UCI WorldTeams along with eight UCI ProTeams formed the twenty-five teams that participated in the race. 96 riders finished the race.

UCI WorldTeams

- AG2R Citroën Team
- Alpecin–Deceuninck
- Arkéa–Samsic
- Astana Qazaqstan Team
- Bora–Hansgrohe
- Cofidis
- Groupama–FDJ
- Ineos Grenadiers
- Intermarché–Circus–Wanty
- Movistar Team
- Soudal–Quick-Step
- Team Bahrain Victorious
- Team DSM
- Team Jayco–AlUla
- Team Jumbo–Visma
- Trek–Segafredo
- UAE Team Emirates

UCI ProTeams

- Bingoal WB
- Human Powered Health
- Israel–Premier Tech
- Lotto–Dstny
- Q36.5 Pro Cycling Team
- Team Flanders–Baloise
- Team TotalEnergies
- Uno-X Pro Cycling Team

== Result ==
Result
Rank	Rider	Team	Time
1	Tiesj Benoot (BEL)	Team Jumbo–Visma	4h 32' 25"
2	Nathan Van Hooydonck (BEL)	Team Jumbo–Visma	+ 1"
3	Matej Mohorič (SLO)	Team Bahrain Victorious	+ 1"
4	Taco van der Hoorn (NED)	Intermarché–Circus–Wanty	+ 1"
5	Tim Wellens (BEL)	UAE Team Emirates	+ 1"
6	Christophe Laporte (FRA)	Team Jumbo–Visma	+ 43"
7	Arnaud De Lie (BEL)	Lotto–Dstny	+ 43"
8	Jordi Meeus (BEL)	Bora–Hansgrohe	+ 43"
9	Fabio Jakobsen (NED)	Soudal–Quick-Step	+ 43"
10	Jasper Stuyven (BEL)	Trek–Segafredo	+ 43"
