= 2021 Dwars door Vlaanderen =

Cycling race

2021 UCI World Tour, race 11 of 29
- Event poster with previous winners Mathieu van der Poel and Ellen van Dijk

Race details
- Dates: 31 March 2021
- Stages: 1
- Distance: 184.1 km (114.4 mi)
- Winning time: 3h 59' 05"

Results
	Winner	Dylan van Baarle (NED)	(Ineos Grenadiers)
	Second	Christophe Laporte (FRA)	(Cofidis)
	Third	Tim Merlier (BEL)	(Alpecin–Fenix)

The 2021 Dwars door Vlaanderen was a road cycling one-day race that took place on 31 March 2021 in Belgium. It was the 75th edition of Dwars door Vlaanderen and the 11th event of the 2021 UCI World Tour. It was won by Dutch rider Dylan van Baarle of Ineos Grenadiers.

== Teams ==
All nineteen UCI WorldTeams and six UCI ProTeams participated to the race. Of the twenty-five teams, only Trek–Segafredo did not compete with the maximum allowed seven riders. A few riders were found to have been in close contact with staff members who tested positive for COVID-19, the same positive test results that had forced them to withdraw from Gent–Wevelgem three days prior, so they had to be in isolation for a week. The short notice prevented the team from making last-minute substitutions, so they decided to field only five riders.123 of the 171 riders to start the race finished.

UCI WorldTeams

- AG2R Citroën Team
- Astana–Premier Tech
- Bora–Hansgrohe
- Cofidis
- Deceuninck–Quick-Step
- EF Education–Nippo
- Groupama–FDJ
- Ineos Grenadiers
- Intermarché–Wanty–Gobert Matériaux
- Israel Start-Up Nation
- Lotto–Soudal
- Movistar Team
- Team Bahrain Victorious
- Team BikeExchange
- Team DSM
- Team Jumbo–Visma
- Team Qhubeka Assos
- Trek–Segafredo
- UAE Team Emirates

UCI ProTeams

- Alpecin–Fenix
- Arkéa–Samsic
- B&B Hotels p/b KTM
- Bingoal Pauwels Sauces WB
- Sport Vlaanderen–Baloise
- Total Direct Énergie

== Results ==
Result
Rank	Rider	Team	Time
1	Dylan van Baarle (NED)	Ineos Grenadiers	3h 59' 05"
2	Christophe Laporte (FRA)	Cofidis	+ 26"
3	Tim Merlier (BEL)	Alpecin–Fenix	+ 26"
4	Yves Lampaert (BEL)	Deceuninck–Quick-Step	+ 26"
5	Tosh Van der Sande (BEL)	Lotto–Soudal	+ 26"
6	Alexander Kristoff (NOR)	UAE Team Emirates	+ 26"
7	Greg Van Avermaet (BEL)	AG2R Citroën Team	+ 26"
8	Anthony Turgis (FRA)	Total Direct Énergie	+ 26"
9	Florian Sénéchal (FRA)	Deceuninck–Quick-Step	+ 26"
10	Jasper Stuyven (BEL)	Trek–Segafredo	+ 26"
