= 2020 Omloop Het Nieuwsblad =

2020 UCI World Tour, race 4 of 21
- Event poster with previous winners Chantal Blaak and Zdeněk Štybar

Race details
- Dates: 29 February 2020
- Stages: 1
- Distance: 200 km (120 mi)
- Winning time: 5h 03' 24"

Results
	Winner	Jasper Stuyven (BEL)	(Trek–Segafredo)
	Second	Yves Lampaert (BEL)	(Deceuninck–Quick-Step)
	Third	Søren Kragh Andersen (DEN)	(Team Sunweb)

The 2020 Omloop Het Nieuwsblad was a road cycling one-day race that took place on 29 February 2020 in Belgium, starting in Gent and finishing in Ninove. It was the 75th edition of the Omloop Het Nieuwsblad and the fourth event of the 2020 UCI World Tour.

Belgian rider Jasper Stuyven of Trek–Segafredo beat fellow Belgian rider Yves Lampaert of Deceuninck–Quick-Step in a two-up sprint to take the victory. Danish rider Søren Kragh Andersen of Team Sunweb, who had been dropped by the Belgian duo within the last three kilometers, finished solo to take third place.

== Teams ==
Twenty-five teams were invited to the race, which included all nineteen UCI WorldTour teams and six UCI Professional Continental teams. Each team started with seven riders for a total of 175 riders; of these, only 69 riders finished.

UCI WorldTeams

- AG2R La Mondiale
- Astana
- Bahrain–McLaren
- Bora–Hansgrohe
- CCC Team
- Cofidis
- Deceuninck–Quick-Step
- EF Pro Cycling
- Groupama–FDJ
- Israel Start-Up Nation
- Lotto–Soudal
- Mitchelton–Scott
- Movistar Team
- NTT Pro Cycling
- Team Ineos
- Team Jumbo–Visma
- Team Sunweb
- Trek–Segafredo
- UAE Team Emirates

UCI Professional Continental Teams

- Alpecin–Fenix
- Arkéa–Samsic
- Bingoal–Wallonie Bruxelles
- Circus–Wanty Gobert
- Sport Vlaanderen–Baloise
- Total Direct Énergie

== Pre-race favourites ==
Mathieu van der Poel was the favourite to win, but was forced to withdraw through illness. The 2016 and 2017 winner, Greg Van Avermaet, was the subsequent favourite for victory. The 2019 winner, Zdeněk Štybar, also returned to defend his title.

== Result ==
Result
Rank	Rider	Team	Time
1	Jasper Stuyven (BEL)	Trek–Segafredo	5h 03' 24"
2	Yves Lampaert (BEL)	Deceuninck–Quick-Step	+ 0"
3	Søren Kragh Andersen (DEN)	Team Sunweb	+ 6"
4	Matteo Trentin (ITA)	CCC Team	+ 39"
5	Tim Declercq (BEL)	Deceuninck–Quick-Step	+ 1' 28"
6	Mike Teunissen (NED)	Team Jumbo–Visma	+ 1' 28"
7	Oliver Naesen (BEL)	AG2R La Mondiale	+ 1' 28"
8	Philippe Gilbert (BEL)	Lotto–Soudal	+ 1' 28"
9	Stefan Küng (SUI)	Groupama–FDJ	+ 1' 28"
10	Florian Sénéchal (FRA)	Deceuninck–Quick-Step	+ 1' 28"
