= 2019 Omloop Het Nieuwsblad =

2019 UCI World Tour, race 4 of 38

Race details
- Dates: 2 March 2019
- Stages: 1
- Distance: 200 km (120 mi)
- Winning time: 4h 53' 23"

Results
	Winner	Zdeněk Štybar (CZE)	(Deceuninck–Quick-Step)
	Second	Greg Van Avermaet (BEL)	(CCC Team)
	Third	Tim Wellens (BEL)	(Lotto–Soudal)

The 2019 Omloop Het Nieuwsblad was a road cycling one-day race that took place on 2 March 2019 in Belgium. It was the 74th edition of the Omloop Het Nieuwsblad and the fourth event of the 2019 UCI World Tour. It was won by Zdeněk Štybar.

== Result ==
Result
Rank	Rider	Team	Time
1	Zdeněk Štybar (CZE)	Deceuninck–Quick-Step	4h 53' 17"
2	Greg Van Avermaet (BEL)	CCC Team	+ 9"
3	Tim Wellens (BEL)	Lotto–Soudal	+ 9"
4	Alexey Lutsenko (KAZ)	Astana	+ 9"
5	Dylan Teuns (BEL)	Bahrain–Merida	+ 9"
6	Jempy Drucker (LUX)	Bora–Hansgrohe	+ 25"
7	Yves Lampaert (BEL)	Deceuninck–Quick-Step	+ 25"
8	Philippe Gilbert (BEL)	Deceuninck–Quick-Step	+ 25"
9	Matteo Trentin (ITA)	Mitchelton–Scott	+ 25"
10	Oliver Naesen (BEL)	AG2R La Mondiale	+ 25"
