= 2023 E3 Saxo Classic =

Cycling race

2023 UCI World Tour, race 11 of 35

Race details
- Dates: 24 March 2023
- Stages: 1
- Distance: 204.1 km (126.8 mi)
- Winning time: 4h 44' 59"

Results
	Winner	Wout van Aert (BEL)	(Team Jumbo–Visma)
	Second	Mathieu van der Poel (NED)	(Alpecin–Deceuninck)
	Third	Tadej Pogačar (SLO)	(UAE Team Emirates)

The 2023 E3 Saxo Classic was a road cycling one-day race that took place on 24 March 2023 in Belgium. It was the 65th edition of the E3 Saxo Bank Classic, and the 11th event of the 2023 UCI World Tour.

== Teams ==
Twenty-five teams participated in the race, including all eighteen UCI WorldTeams and seven UCI ProTeams.

UCI WorldTeams

- AG2R Citroën Team
- Alpecin–Deceuninck
- Arkéa–Samsic
- Astana Qazaqstan Team
- Bora–Hansgrohe
- Cofidis
- EF Education–EasyPost
- Groupama–FDJ
- INEOS Grenadiers
- Intermarché–Circus–Wanty
- Movistar Team
- Soudal–Quick-Step
- Team Bahrain Victorious
- Team DSM
- Team Jayco–AlUla
- Team Jumbo–Visma
- Trek–Segafredo
- UAE Team Emirates

UCI ProTeams

- Bingoal WB
- Israel–Premier Tech
- Lotto–Dstny
- Q36.5 Pro Cycling Team
- Team Flanders–Baloise
- Team TotalEnergies
- Uno-X Pro Cycling Team

== Result ==
Result (1–10)
Rank	Rider	Team	Time
1	Wout van Aert (BEL)	Team Jumbo–Visma	4h 44' 59"
2	Mathieu van der Poel (NED)	Alpecin–Deceuninck	+ 0"
3	Tadej Pogačar (SLO)	UAE Team Emirates	+ 0"
4	Matteo Jorgenson (USA)	Movistar Team	+ 33"
5	Iván García Cortina (ESP)	Movistar Team	+ 44"
6	Stefan Küng (SUI)	Groupama–FDJ	+ 56"
7	Matej Mohorič (SLO)	Team Bahrain Victorious	+ 56"
8	Valentin Madouas (FRA)	Groupama–FDJ	+ 1' 25"
9	Søren Kragh Andersen (DEN)	Alpecin–Deceuninck	+ 1' 31"
10	Filippo Ganna (ITA)	INEOS Grenadiers	+ 1' 31"
