= 2024 E3 Saxo Classic =

Cycling race

2024 UCI World Tour, race 11 of 35

Race details
- Dates: 22 March 2024
- Stages: 1
- Distance: 207.6 km (129.0 mi)
- Winning time: 4h 39' 28"

Results
	Winner	Mathieu van der Poel (NED)	(Alpecin–Deceuninck)
	Second	Jasper Stuyven (BEL)	(Lidl–Trek)
	Third	Wout van Aert (BEL)	(Visma–Lease a Bike)

The 2024 E3 Saxo Classic was a road cycling one-day race that took place on 22 March in Belgium. It was the 66th edition of the E3 Saxo Bank Classic, and the 11th event of the 2024 UCI World Tour.

== Teams ==
Twenty-five teams participated in the race, including all eighteen UCI WorldTeams and seven UCI ProTeams.

UCI WorldTeams

- Alpecin–Deceuninck
- Arkéa–B&B Hotels
- Astana Qazaqstan Team
- Bora–Hansgrohe
- Cofidis
- Decathlon–AG2R La Mondiale
- EF Education–EasyPost
- Groupama–FDJ
- INEOS Grenadiers
- Intermarché–Wanty
- Lidl–Trek
- Movistar Team
- Soudal–Quick-Step
- Team Bahrain Victorious
- Team dsm–firmenich PostNL
- Team Jayco–AlUla
- UAE Team Emirates
- Visma–Lease a Bike

UCI ProTeams

- Bingoal WB
- Israel–Premier Tech
- Lotto–Dstny
- Q36.5 Pro Cycling Team
- Team Flanders–Baloise
- Tudor Pro Cycling Team
- Uno-X Mobility

== Result ==
Result (1–10)
Rank	Rider	Team	Time
1	Mathieu van der Poel (NED)	Alpecin–Deceuninck	4h 39' 28"
2	Jasper Stuyven (BEL)	Lidl–Trek	+ 1' 31"
3	Wout van Aert (BEL)	Visma–Lease a Bike	+ 1' 34"
4	Tim Wellens (BEL)	UAE Team Emirates	+ 1' 48"
5	Matteo Jorgenson (USA)	Visma–Lease a Bike	+ 1' 50"
6	Jhonatan Narváez (ECU)	INEOS Grenadiers	+ 1' 52"
7	Nils Politt (GER)	UAE Team Emirates	+ 2' 48"
8	Toms Skujiņš (LAT)	Lidl–Trek	+ 2' 48"
9	Vincenzo Albanese (ITA)	Arkéa–B&B Hotels	+ 2' 48"
10	Alex Kirsch (LUX)	Lidl–Trek	+ 2' 48"
