= 2024 Kuurne–Brussels–Kuurne =

2024 UCI ProSeries
- Event poster, illustrated by Ever Meulen

Race details
- Dates: 25 February 2024
- Stages: 1
- Distance: 196.4 km (122.0 mi)
- Winning time: 4h 20' 58"

Results
| | Winner | Wout van Aert (BEL) | (Visma–Lease a Bike) |
| | Second | Tim Wellens (BEL) | (UAE Team Emirates) |
| | Third | Oier Lazkano (ESP) | (Movistar Team) |

The 2024 Kuurne–Brussels–Kuurne was the 76th edition of the Kuurne–Brussels–Kuurne cycling classic. It was held on 25 February 2024 as a category 1.Pro race on the 2024 UCI ProSeries.

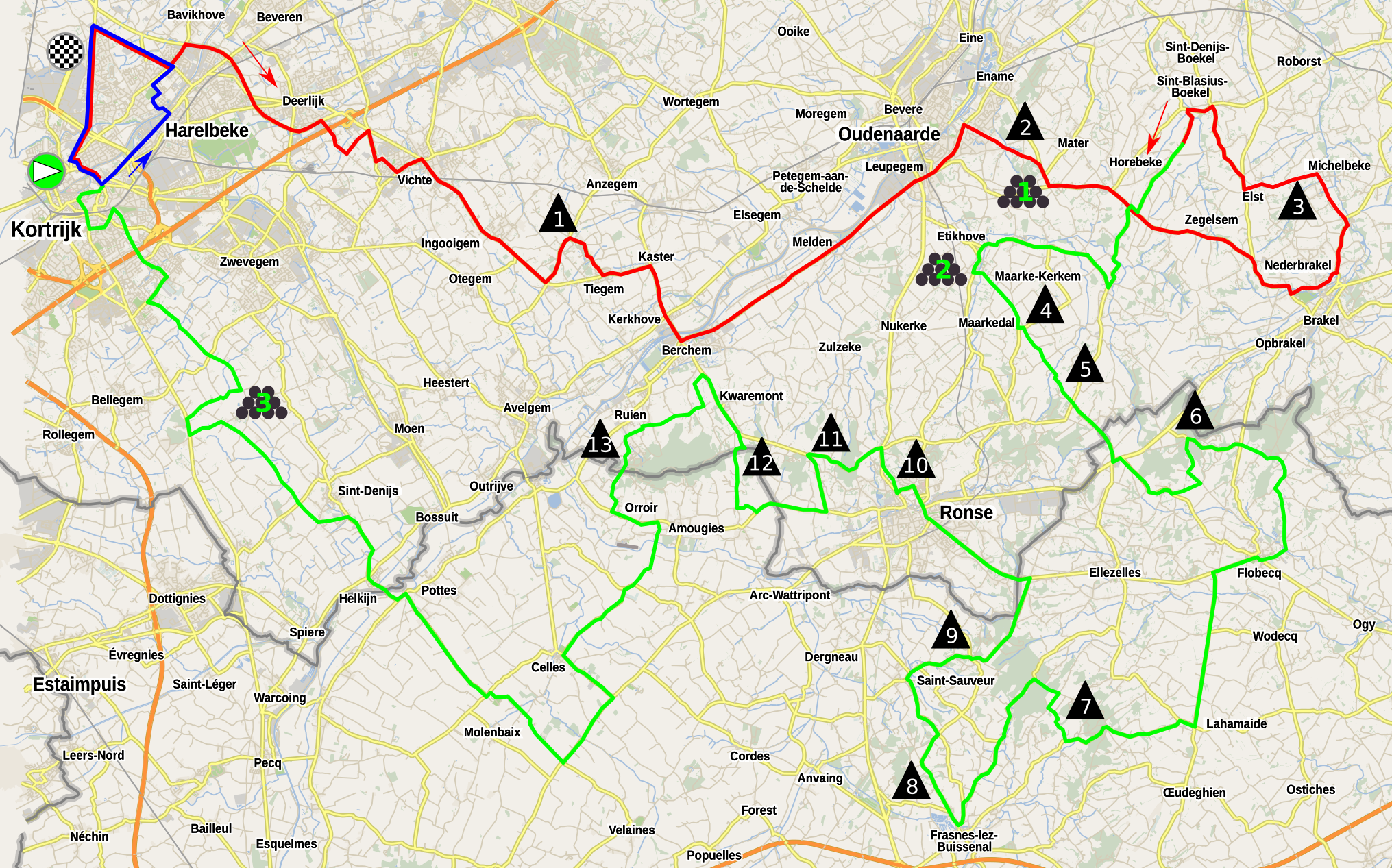
Map of 2024 Kuurne-Brussel-Kuurne

== Teams ==
Seventeen of the eighteen UCI WorldTeams along with eight UCI ProTeams formed the twenty-five teams that participated in the race.

UCI WorldTeams

- Alpecin–Deceuninck
- Arkéa–B&B Hotels
- Astana Qazaqstan Team
- Team Bahrain Victorious
- Bora–Hansgrohe
- Cofidis
- Decathlon–AG2R La Mondiale
- Groupama–FDJ
- Ineos Grenadiers
- Intermarché–Wanty
- Lidl–Trek
- Movistar Team
- Soudal–Quick-Step
- Team dsm–firmenich PostNL
- Team Jayco–AlUla
- Visma–Lease a Bike
- UAE Team Emirates

UCI ProTeams

- Bingoal WB
- Israel–Premier Tech
- Lotto–Dstny
- Q36.5 Pro Cycling Team
- Team Flanders–Baloise
- Team TotalEnergies
- Tudor Pro Cycling Team
- Uno-X Mobility

== Result ==
Result
| Rank | Rider | Team | Time |
|---|---|---|---|
| 1 | Wout van Aert (BEL) | Visma–Lease a Bike | 4h 20' 58" |
| 2 | Tim Wellens (BEL) | UAE Team Emirates | + 0" |
| 3 | Oier Lazkano (ESP) | Movistar Team | + 0" |
| 4 | Christophe Laporte (FRA) | Visma–Lease a Bike | + 1' 23" |
| 5 | Nils Eekhoff (NED) | Team dsm–firmenich PostNL | + 1' 23" |
| 6 | Emilien Jeannière (FRA) | Team TotalEnergies | + 1' 23" |
| 7 | Luke Lamperti (USA) | Soudal–Quick-Step | + 1' 23" |
| 8 | Lionel Taminiaux (BEL) | Lotto–Dstny | + 1' 23" |
| 9 | Marius Mayrhofer (GER) | Tudor Pro Cycling Team | + 1' 23" |
| 10 | Jasper Stuyven (BEL) | Lidl–Trek | + 1' 23" |
