= 2016 Kuurne–Brussels–Kuurne =

Race details
- Dates: 28 February 2016
- Stages: 1
- Distance: 200.7 km (124.7 mi)
- Winning time: 4h 53' 51"

Results
	Winner	Jasper Stuyven (BEL)	(Trek–Segafredo)
	Second	Alexander Kristoff (NOR)	(Team Katusha)
	Third	Nacer Bouhanni (FRA)	(Cofidis)

The 68th edition of the Kuurne–Brussels–Kuurne cycling classic was held on 28 February 2016. It was part of the 2016 UCI Europe Tour and ranked as a 1.HC event. It was the second and concluding race of the Belgian opening weekend, the year's first road races in Northwestern Europe, one day after Omloop Het Nieuwsblad.

Belgian Jasper Stuyven won the race after a 17 km solo. The route was 200.7 km (125 mi), starting and finishing in Kuurne. 199 riders started and 97 riders finished the race.

== Hills in the race ==
1	Edelare Top (64 m / 7% max)	7	Oude Kwaremont ( 89 m / 11.6% max)
2	La Houppe (80 m / 10% max)	8	Kluisberg (113 m / 10% max)
3	Kanarieberg (77 m / 14% max)	9	Tiegemberg (42 m / 9% max)
4	Kruisberg ( 90 m / 9% max)	10	Holstraat (52 m / 12% max)
5	Hotond ( 128 m / 7.5% max)	11	Nokereberg (20 m / 7% max)
6	Cote du Trieu ( 88 m / 13% max)		(Height difference / Gradient maximum)

== Results ==
Result
Rank	Rider	Team	Time
1	Jasper Stuyven (BEL)	Trek–Segafredo	4h 53' 51"
2	Alexander Kristoff (NOR)	Team Katusha	+ 17"
3	Nacer Bouhanni (FRA)	Cofidis	s.t.
4	Dylan Groenewegen (NED)	LottoNL–Jumbo	s.t.
5	Łukasz Wiśniowski (POL)	Etixx–Quick-Step	s.t.
6	Niccolò Bonifazio (ITA)	Trek–Segafredo	s.t.
7	Peter Sagan (SVK)	Tinkoff	s.t.
8	Edward Theuns (BEL)	Trek–Segafredo	s.t.
9	Jonas van Genechten (BEL)	IAM Cycling	s.t.
10	Scott Thwaites (GBR)	Bora–Argon 18	s.t.
