= 2023 Omloop Het Nieuwsblad =

Bicycle race

2023 UCI World Tour, race 4 of 35
- Previous winners Wout van Aert and Annemiek van Vleuten portrayed on the event poster

Race details
- Dates: 25 February 2023
- Stages: 1
- Distance: 207.3 km (128.8 mi)

Results
	Winner	Dylan van Baarle (NED)	(Team Jumbo–Visma)
	Second	Arnaud De Lie (BEL)	(Lotto–Dstny)
	Third	Christophe Laporte (FRA)	(Team Jumbo–Visma)

The 2023 Omloop Het Nieuwsblad was a road cycling one-day race that took place on 25 February 2023 in Belgium, starting in Gent and finishing in Ninove. It was the 78th edition of the Omloop Het Nieuwsblad and the fourth event of the 2023 UCI World Tour.

== Teams ==
Twenty-five teams participated in the race, including all eighteen UCI WorldTeams and seven UCI ProTeams teams. Each team entered seven riders, for a total of 175 riders.

UCI WorldTeams

- AG2R Citroën Team
- Alpecin–Deceuninck
- Arkéa–Samsic
- Astana Qazaqstan Team
- Bora–Hansgrohe
- Cofidis
- EF Education–EasyPost
- Groupama–FDJ
- Ineos Grenadiers
- Intermarché–Circus–Wanty
- Movistar Team
- Soudal–Quick-Step
- Team Bahrain Victorious
- Team DSM
- Team Jayco–AlUla
- Team Jumbo–Visma
- Trek–Segafredo
- UAE Team Emirates

UCI ProSeries Teams

- Bingoal WB
- Human Powered Health
- Israel–Premier Tech
- Lotto–Dstny
- Team Flanders–Baloise
- Team TotalEnergies
- Uno-X Pro Cycling Team

== Result ==
Result
Rank	Rider	Team	Time
1	Dylan van Baarle (NED)	Team Jumbo–Visma	4h 54' 49"
2	Arnaud De Lie (BEL)	Lotto–Dstny	+ 20"
3	Christophe Laporte (FRA)	Team Jumbo–Visma	+ 20"
4	Alexander Kristoff (NOR)	Uno-X Pro Cycling Team	+ 20"
5	Thomas Pidcock (GBR)	Ineos Grenadiers	+ 20"
6	Davide Ballerini (ITA)	Soudal–Quick-Step	+ 20"
7	Nils Politt (GER)	Bora–Hansgrohe	+ 20"
8	Andrea Pasqualon (ITA)	Team Bahrain Victorious	+ 20"
9	Rui Oliveira (POR)	UAE Team Emirates	+ 20"
10	Sep Vanmarcke (BEL)	Israel–Premier Tech	+ 20"
