= Jempy Drucker =

Luxembourgish road cyclist

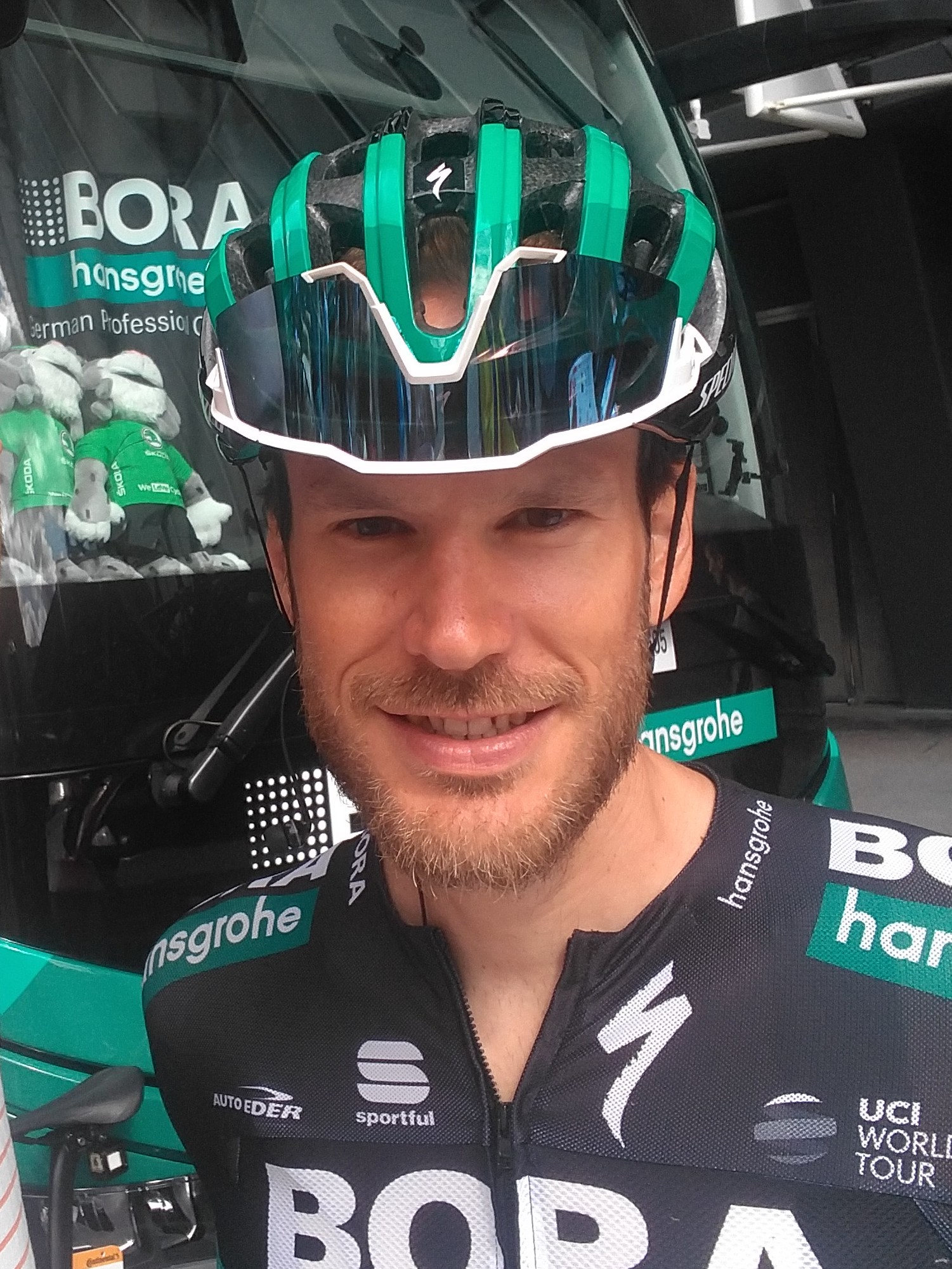
- Drucker at 2019 Vuelta a España

Personal information
- Full name: Jean-Pierre Drucker
- Nickname: Jempy
- Born: 3 September 1986 (age 40) Sandweiler, Luxembourg
- Height: 1.82 m (6 ft 0 in)
- Weight: 75 kg (165 lb; 11.8 st)

Cycling career
- Sport: Cycling
- Current team: Retired
- Disciplines: Road; Cyclo-cross
- Role: Rider
- Rider type: Classics specialist Sprinter

Professional teams
- 2004–2008: Fidea
- 2009–2010: Continental Team Differdange
- 2011–2014: Veranda's Willems–Accent
- 2015–2018: BMC Racing Team
- 2019–2020: Bora–Hansgrohe
- 2021: Cofidis

Major wins
- Grand Tours Vuelta a España 1 individual stage (2016) One-Day Races and Classics National Time Trial Championships (2017) London–Surrey Classic (2015)

Jean-Pierre "Jempy" Drucker (born 3 September 1986) is a retired Luxembourgish professional racing cyclist.

== Career ==
=== Fidea (2004–2008) ===
Born in Sandweiler, Drucker signed with Fidea in 2004, a team specializing in cyclo-cross, at age 18. He rode with this team for five seasons, winning two elite national cyclo-cross championships. He was selected to represent Luxembourg at the World Road Race Championships in 2008, but failed to finish.

=== Team Differdange (2009–2010) ===
For the 2009 season, Drucker joined Continental Team Differdange. His success in cyclo-cross continued, winning two more national titles. Drucker went to the World Road Race Championships for the second time in 2009, but again did not finish. He won the prologue of the Flèche du Sud, a UCI 2.2 road race in 2010. Drucker also placed second in the Grote Prijs Stad Zottegem that season.

=== Wanty–Groupe Gobert (2011–2014) ===
After spending two seasons with Continental Team Differdange, Drucker joined Veranda's Willems–Accent, a Belgian UCI Professional Continental team. Spending four seasons with the team, he booked no wins, but did finish second overall in the Tour de Luxembourg.

=== BMC Racing Team (2015–2018) ===
In August 2014, Drucker signed a contract with BMC Racing Team. While riding for this team, he won the 2015 RideLondon–Surrey Classic, a one-day race in the United Kingdom. Later that year, he was selected to ride in the Vuelta a España. Drucker finished the race in 118th place overall. Drucker's success continued with this team the following year, winning the prologue of the Tour de Luxembourg and the 16th stage of the Vuelta a España.

In May 2018, he was named in the startlist for the 2018 Giro d'Italia.

=== Retirement ===
Drucker announced his retirement via Twitter on 10 January 2022.

== Major results ==
=== Road ===
2003
National Junior Road Championships

2nd Time trial
2nd Road race

2007
6th Overall Mainfranken-Tour
2008
3rd Road race, National Under-23 Road Championships
2009
5th Grote Prijs Stad Zottegem
9th Arno Wallaard Memorial
10th Overall Flèche du Sud
10th Münsterland Giro
2010
1st Prologue Flèche du Sud
2nd Grote Prijs Stad Zottegem
4th Ronde van Midden-Nederland
5th Nationale Sluitingsprijs
7th Arno Wallaard Memorial
7th Ronde van Noord-Holland
2011
6th Grote Prijs Stad Zottegem
2012
2nd Grote Prijs Stad Zottegem
3rd Schaal Sels
6th Paris–Brussels
7th Omloop van het Houtland
9th Grand Prix Pino Cerami
10th Grand Prix Criquielion
2013
3rd Road race, National Road Championships
3rd Grand Prix d'Isbergues
5th Overall Tour de l'Eurométropole
5th Ronde van Zeeland Seaports
6th Overall Tour de Wallonie
7th Omloop van het Houtland
2014
2nd Overall Tour de Luxembourg
4th Dwars door Vlaanderen
5th Arnhem–Veenendaal Classic
5th Münsterland Giro
5th Paris–Bourges
6th Omloop Het Nieuwsblad
6th Grote Prijs Jef Scherens
6th Paris–Tours
8th Grand Prix d'Isbergues
9th Nokere Koerse
10th Binche–Chimay–Binche
2015
1st RideLondon–Surrey Classic
1st Stage 1 (TTT) Vuelta a España
2nd Time trial, National Road Championships
5th Grand Prix Impanis-Van Petegem
6th Kuurne–Brussels–Kuurne
7th Overall Driedaagse van West-Vlaanderen
10th Handzame Classic
2016
1st Stage 16 Vuelta a España
1st Prologue Tour de Luxembourg
1st Stage 1 (TTT) Tirreno–Adriatico
2nd Time trial, National Road Championships
9th E3 Harelbeke
10th Overall Ster ZLM Toer
10th Paris–Tours
2017
1st Time trial, National Road Championships
1st Stage 1 Tour de Luxembourg
1st Stage 4 Tour de Wallonie
1st Stage 1 (TTT) Tirreno–Adriatico
2nd Primus Classic
2nd Grand Prix Pino Cerami
3rd Overall Tour du Poitou-Charentes
4th Overall Dubai Tour
4th Eschborn–Frankfurt – Rund um den Finanzplatz
5th Tour de l'Eurométropole
6th London–Surrey Classic
10th Paris–Tours
2018
2nd Tour de l'Eurométropole
5th Grand Prix Pino Cerami
6th Kuurne–Brussels–Kuurne
6th Binche–Chimay–Binche
7th London–Surrey Classic
8th Overall Dubai Tour
2019
6th Omloop Het Nieuwsblad
2020
3rd Road race, National Road Championships
5th Three Days of Bruges–De Panne
7th Overall Okolo Slovenska
2021
2nd Road race, National Road Championships

==== Grand Tour general classification results timeline ====
| Grand Tour | 2015 | 2016 | 2017 | 2018 | 2019 |
|---|---|---|---|---|---|
| Giro d'Italia | — | — | — | 118 | — |
| Tour de France | Did not contest during his career | | | | |
| Vuelta a España | 118 | 142 | — | — | DNF |

==== Classics results timeline ====
| Monument | 2011 | 2012 | 2013 | 2014 | 2015 | 2016 | 2017 | 2018 | 2019 | 2020 | 2021 |
|---|---|---|---|---|---|---|---|---|---|---|---|
| Milan–San Remo | — | — | — | — | — | 139 | — | 56 | 30 | — | — |
| Tour of Flanders | 102 | — | DNF | DNF | 28 | 19 | 99 | 31 | — | 37 | DNF |
| Paris–Roubaix | — | — | — | 20 | 73 | 69 | 74 | 23 | — | NH | 43 |
| Liège–Bastogne–Liège | — | — | DNF | — | — | — | — | — | — | — | — |
| Giro di Lombardia | — | — | — | — | — | — | — | — | — | DNF | — |
| Classic | 2011 | 2012 | 2013 | 2014 | 2015 | 2016 | 2017 | 2018 | 2019 | 2020 | 2021 |
| Omloop Het Nieuwsblad | — | — | 13 | 6 | 49 | DNF | 34 | 30 | 6 | 12 | 82 |
| Kuurne–Brussels–Kuurne | — | 22 | NH | 42 | 6 | 73 | 17 | 6 | 35 | 16 | 59 |
| E3 Saxo Bank Classic | — | — | DNF | 28 | 32 | 9 | 47 | 20 | 78 | NH | DNF |
| London–Surrey Classic | — | — | — | — | 1 | 79 | 6 | 7 | 121 | Not held | |
| Paris–Tours | DNF | 134 | 37 | 6 | — | 10 | 10 | — | — | — | 42 |

Legend
| — | Did not compete |
| DNF | Did not finish |
| NH | Not held |

=== Cyclo-cross ===
2002–2003
1st National Junior Championships
2003–2004
1st National Junior Championships
Junior Superprestige

2nd Sint-Michielsgestel
3rd Harnes

2004–2005
1st National Under-23 Championships
2005–2006
1st National Championships
1st National Under-23 Championships
2006–2007
1st National Under-23 Championships
1st Grand Prix Pierre Kellner
2nd Herdenkingscross Etienne Bleukx Under-23
3rd National Championships
3rd Gieten, Under-23 Superprestige
2007–2008
1st National Championships
1st Grand Prix Julien Cajot
2nd Overall Under-23 Superprestige

1st Hoogstraten
2nd Vorselaar
3rd Diegem
3rd Gieten

2nd Hoogerheide, UCI Under-23 World Cup
3rd GP Stad Hasselt Under-23
2009–2010
1st National Championships
2010–2011
1st National Championships
