= 2013 Tour of Qatar =

Race details
- Dates: 3–8 February 2013
- Stages: 6
- Distance: 732.2 km (455.0 mi)
- Winning time: 15h 55' 20"

Results
Jersey awarded to the overall winner	Winner	Mark Cavendish (GBR)	(Omega Pharma–Quick-Step)
	Second	Brent Bookwalter (USA)	(BMC Racing Team)
	Third	Taylor Phinney (USA)	(BMC Racing Team)
	Points	Mark Cavendish (GBR)	(Omega Pharma–Quick-Step)
Jersey awarded to the youth classification winner	Youth	Taylor Phinney (USA)	(BMC Racing Team)
	Team	BMC Racing Team	

The 2013 Tour of Qatar was the twelfth edition of the Tour of Qatar cycling stage race. It was rated as a 2.HC event on the UCI Asia Tour, and was held between 3 and 8 February 2013, in Qatar.

The race was won by Britain's Mark Cavendish, of the Omega Pharma–Quick-Step team, winning the final four stages to take the victory. Cavendish's winning margin over runner-up Brent Bookwalter (BMC Racing Team) – the winners of the team time trial stage – was 25 seconds, and Brookwalter's teammate Taylor Phinney completed the podium, one second behind Brookwalter and 26 seconds down on Cavendish. In the race's other classifications, Cavendish also won the points classification, Phinney won the white jersey for the youth classification, by placing third overall in the general classification, and BMC Racing Team finished at the head of the teams classification.

== Teams ==
Eighteen teams competed in the 2013 Tour of Qatar. These included twelve UCI ProTour teams, five UCI Professional Continental teams, and a national team representing Japan.

The teams that participated in the race were:

- Ag2r–La Mondiale
- Argos–Shimano
- Astana
- BMC Racing Team
- Cannondale
- FDJ
- Omega Pharma–Quick-Step
- Orica–GreenEDGE
- RadioShack–Leopard
- Saxo–Tinkoff
- Team Sky
- Vacansoleil–DCM
- Bardiani Valvole–CSF Inox
- Champion System
- IAM Cycling
- Team Katusha
- NetApp–Endura
- Japan (national team)

== Race overview ==
Stage	Date	Course	Distance	Type	Winner
1	3 February	Katara Cultural Village to Dukhan Beach	145.2 km (90.2 mi)	Flat stage	Brent Bookwalter (USA)
2	4 February	Al Rufaa Street	14 km (8.7 mi)	Team time trial	BMC Racing Team
3	5 February	Al Wakra to Mesaieed	143 km (88.9 mi)	Flat stage	Mark Cavendish (GBR)
4	6 February	Camel Race Track to Al Khor Corniche	160 km (99.4 mi)	Flat stage	Mark Cavendish (GBR)
5	7 February	Al Zubara Fort to Madinat ash Shamal	154 km (95.7 mi)	Flat stage	Mark Cavendish (GBR)
6	8 February	Sealine Beach Resort to Doha Corniche	116 km (72.1 mi)	Flat stage	Mark Cavendish (GBR)

== Stages ==
=== Stage 1 ===
3 February 2013 – Katara Cultural Village to Dukhan Beach, 145.2 km (90.2 mi)

Stage 1 result

	Rider	Team	Time
1	Brent Bookwalter (USA)	BMC Racing Team	3h 28' 47"
2	Martin Elmiger (SUI)	IAM Cycling	s.t.
3	Grégory Rast (SUI)	RadioShack–Leopard	s.t.
4	Bernhard Eisel (AUT)	Team Sky	s.t.
5	Elia Viviani (ITA)	Cannondale	s.t.
6	Mark Cavendish (GBR)	Omega Pharma–Quick-Step	s.t.
7	Matti Breschel (DEN)	Saxo–Tinkoff	s.t.
8	Taylor Phinney (USA)	BMC Racing Team	s.t.
9	Heinrich Haussler (AUS)	IAM Cycling	s.t.
10	Mathieu Ladagnous (FRA)	FDJ	s.t.

General Classification after Stage 1

	Rider	Team	Time
1	Brent Bookwalter (USA)	BMC Racing Team	3h 28' 37"
2	Martin Elmiger (SUI)	IAM Cycling	+ 4"
3	Grégory Rast (SUI)	RadioShack–Leopard	+ 6"
4	Bernhard Eisel (AUT)	Team Sky	+ 6"
5	Taylor Phinney (USA)	BMC Racing Team	+ 6"
6	John Degenkolb (GER)	Argos–Shimano	+ 8"
7	Alexander Kristoff (NOR)	Team Katusha	+ 8"
8	Elia Viviani (ITA)	Cannondale	+ 10"
9	Mark Cavendish (GBR)	Omega Pharma–Quick-Step	+ 10"
10	Matti Breschel (DEN)	Saxo–Tinkoff	+ 10"

=== Stage 2 ===
4 February 2013 – Al Rufaa Street, 14 km (8.7 mi) team time trial (TTT)

Stage 2 result

	Team	Time
1	BMC Racing Team	16' 07"
2	Team Sky	+ 5"
3	Omega Pharma–Quick-Step	+ 10"
4	RadioShack–Leopard	+ 11"
5	Team Katusha	+ 15"
6	Astana	+ 17"
7	FDJ	+ 23"
8	Orica–GreenEDGE	+ 23"
9	Cannondale	+ 24"
10	Saxo–Tinkoff	+ 26"

General Classification after Stage 2

	Rider	Team	Time
1	Brent Bookwalter (USA)	BMC Racing Team	3h 44' 44"
2	Taylor Phinney (USA)	BMC Racing Team	+ 6"
3	Adam Blythe (GBR)	BMC Racing Team	+ 10"
4	Greg Van Avermaet (BEL)	BMC Racing Team	+ 10"
5	Michael Schär (SUI)	BMC Racing Team	+ 10"
6	Bernhard Eisel (AUT)	Team Sky	+ 11"
7	Edvald Boasson Hagen (NOR)	Team Sky	+ 15"
8	Geraint Thomas (GBR)	Team Sky	+ 15"
9	Mathew Hayman (AUS)	Team Sky	+ 15"
10	Luke Rowe (GBR)	Team Sky	+ 15"

=== Stage 3 ===
5 February 2013 – Al Wakra to Mesaieed, 143 km (88.9 mi)

Stage 3 result

	Rider	Team	Time
1	Mark Cavendish (GBR)	Omega Pharma–Quick-Step	3h 05' 14"
2	Barry Markus (NED)	Vacansoleil–DCM	s.t.
3	Aidis Kruopis (LTU)	Orica–GreenEDGE	s.t.
4	Nacer Bouhanni (FRA)	FDJ	s.t.
5	Heinrich Haussler (AUS)	IAM Cycling	s.t.
6	Edvald Boasson Hagen (NOR)	Team Sky	s.t.
7	Roger Kluge (GER)	NetApp–Endura	s.t.
8	John Degenkolb (GER)	Argos–Shimano	s.t.
9	Filippo Fortin (ITA)	Bardiani Valvole–CSF Inox	s.t.
10	Geoffrey Soupe (FRA)	FDJ	s.t.

General Classification after Stage 3

	Rider	Team	Time
1	Brent Bookwalter (USA)	BMC Racing Team	6h 49' 58"
2	Taylor Phinney (USA)	BMC Racing Team	+ 6"
3	Adam Blythe (GBR)	BMC Racing Team	+ 7"
4	Mark Cavendish (GBR)	Omega Pharma–Quick-Step	+ 8"
5	Greg Van Avermaet (BEL)	BMC Racing Team	+ 6"
6	Michael Schär (SUI)	BMC Racing Team	+ 10"
7	Bernhard Eisel (AUT)	Team Sky	+ 11"
8	Mathew Hayman (AUS)	Team Sky	+ 12"
9	Edvald Boasson Hagen (NOR)	Team Sky	+ 14"
10	Geraint Thomas (GBR)	Team Sky	+ 15"

=== Stage 4 ===
6 February 2013 – Camel Race Track to Madinat ash Shamal, 160 km (99.4 mi)

Stage 4 result

	Rider	Team	Time
1	Mark Cavendish (GBR)	Omega Pharma–Quick-Step	3h 30' 05"
2	Barry Markus (NED)	Vacansoleil–DCM	s.t.
3	Andrea Guardini (ITA)	Astana	s.t.
4	Filippo Fortin (ITA)	Bardiani Valvole–CSF Inox	s.t.
5	Alexander Kristoff (NOR)	Astana	s.t.
6	Jonathan Cantwell (AUS)	Saxo–Tinkoff	s.t.
7	Nacer Bouhanni (FRA)	FDJ	s.t.
8	Aidis Kruopis (LTU)	Orica–GreenEDGE	s.t.
9	Edvald Boasson Hagen (NOR)	Team Sky	s.t.
10	Davide Appollonio (ITA)	Ag2r–La Mondiale	s.t.

General Classification after Stage 4

	Rider	Team	Time
1	Mark Cavendish (GBR)	Omega Pharma–Quick-Step	10h 20' 01"
2	Brent Bookwalter (USA)	BMC Racing Team	+ 2"
3	Taylor Phinney (USA)	BMC Racing Team	+ 8"
4	Adam Blythe (GBR)	BMC Racing Team	+ 9"
5	Greg Van Avermaet (BEL)	BMC Racing Team	+ 12"
6	Michael Schär (SUI)	BMC Racing Team	+ 12"
7	Bernhard Eisel (AUT)	Team Sky	+ 13"
8	Mathew Hayman (AUS)	Team Sky	+ 14"
9	Edvald Boasson Hagen (NOR)	Team Sky	+ 16"
10	Geraint Thomas (GBR)	Team Sky	+ 17"

=== Stage 5 ===
7 February 2013 – Al Zubara Fort to Al Khor Corniche, 154 km (95.7 mi)

Stage 5 result

	Rider	Team	Time
1	Mark Cavendish (GBR)	Omega Pharma–Quick-Step	3h 11' 11"
2	Yauheni Hutarovich (BLR)	Ag2r–La Mondiale	s.t.
3	Aidis Kruopis (LTU)	Orica–GreenEDGE	s.t.
4	Adam Blythe (GBR)	BMC Racing Team	s.t.
5	Luke Rowe (GBR)	Team Sky	s.t.
6	John Degenkolb (GER)	Argos–Shimano	s.t.
7	Alexander Kristoff (NOR)	Team Katusha	s.t.
8	Nacer Bouhanni (FRA)	FDJ	s.t.
9	Heinrich Haussler (AUS)	IAM Cycling	s.t.
10	Roger Kluge (GER)	NetApp–Endura	s.t.

General Classification after Stage 5

	Rider	Team	Time
1	Mark Cavendish (GBR)	Omega Pharma–Quick-Step	13h 30' 59"
2	Brent Bookwalter (USA)	BMC Racing Team	+ 15"
3	Taylor Phinney (USA)	BMC Racing Team	+ 20"
4	Adam Blythe (GBR)	BMC Racing Team	+ 22"
5	Bernhard Eisel (AUT)	Team Sky	+ 24"
6	Greg Van Avermaet (BEL)	BMC Racing Team	+ 25"
7	Michael Schär (SUI)	BMC Racing Team	+ 25"
8	Mathew Hayman (AUS)	Team Sky	+ 27"
9	Edvald Boasson Hagen (NOR)	Team Sky	+ 29"
10	Geraint Thomas (GBR)	Team Sky	+ 30"

=== Stage 6 ===
8 February 2013 – Sealine Beach Resort to Doha Corniche, 116 km (72.1 mi)

Stage 6 result

	Rider	Team	Time
1	Mark Cavendish (GBR)	Omega Pharma–Quick-Step	3h 24' 31"
2	Yauheni Hutarovich (BLR)	Ag2r–La Mondiale	s.t.
3	Barry Markus (NED)	Vacansoleil–DCM	s.t.
4	Adam Blythe (GBR)	BMC Racing Team	s.t.
5	Taylor Phinney (USA)	BMC Racing Team	s.t.
6	Kenny van Hummel (NED)	Vacansoleil–DCM	s.t.
7	Alexander Kristoff (NOR)	Team Katusha	s.t.
8	Bernhard Eisel (AUT)	Team Sky	s.t.
9	Nacer Bouhanni (FRA)	FDJ	s.t.
10	Guillaume Boivin (CAN)	Cannondale	s.t.

Final General Classification

	Rider	Team	Time
1	Mark Cavendish (GBR)	Omega Pharma–Quick-Step	15h 55' 20"
2	Brent Bookwalter (USA)	BMC Racing Team	+ 25"
3	Taylor Phinney (USA)	BMC Racing Team	+ 26"
4	Adam Blythe (GBR)	BMC Racing Team	+ 30"
5	Bernhard Eisel (AUT)	Team Sky	+ 32"
6	Greg Van Avermaet (BEL)	BMC Racing Team	+ 32"
7	Michael Schär (SUI)	BMC Racing Team	+ 35"
8	Edvald Boasson Hagen (NOR)	Team Sky	+ 39"
9	Luke Rowe (GBR)	Team Sky	+ 40"
10	Geraint Thomas (GBR)	Team Sky	+ 40"

== Classification leadership ==
Stage	Winner	General Classification	Points Classification	Young Rider Classification	Teams Classification
1	Brent Bookwalter	Brent Bookwalter	Brent Bookwalter	Taylor Phinney	BMC Racing Team
2	BMC Racing Team	Brent Bookwalter	Brent Bookwalter	Taylor Phinney	BMC Racing Team
3	Mark Cavendish	Brent Bookwalter	Mark Cavendish	Taylor Phinney	BMC Racing Team
4	Mark Cavendish	Mark Cavendish	Mark Cavendish	Taylor Phinney	BMC Racing Team
5	Mark Cavendish	Mark Cavendish	Mark Cavendish	Taylor Phinney	BMC Racing Team
6	Mark Cavendish	Mark Cavendish	Mark Cavendish	Taylor Phinney	BMC Racing Team
Final		Mark Cavendish	Mark Cavendish	Taylor Phinney	BMC Racing Team
