= 2015 RideLondon–Surrey Classic =

2015 UCI Europe Tour

Race details
- Dates: 2 August 2015
- Stages: 1
- Distance: 200 km (124.3 mi)
- Winning time: 4h 47' 47"

Results
	Winner	Jempy Drucker (LUX)	(BMC Racing Team)
	Second	Mike Teunissen (NED)	(LottoNL–Jumbo)
	Third	Ben Swift (GBR)	(Team Sky)
	Mountains	Erick Rowsell (GBR)	(Madison Genesis)

The 2015 RideLondon–Surrey Classic (also known as the 2015 Prudential RideLondon–Surrey Classic for sponsorship reasons) was the 3rd running of the RideLondon–Surrey Classic one-day cycling race. It was held on 2 August 2015 as a 1.HC category event within the 2015 UCI Europe Tour.

The race was won by BMC Racing Team rider Jempy Drucker in a sprint finish from the remnants of a breakaway group. Mike Teunissen of LottoNL–Jumbo finished second. The podium was completed by Ben Swift of Team Sky, who had finished as runner-up in the 2014 edition.

== Results ==
	Cyclist	Team	Time
1	Jempy Drucker (LUX)	BMC Racing Team	4h 47' 47"
2	Mike Teunissen (NED)	LottoNL–Jumbo	s.t.
3	Ben Swift (GBR)	Team Sky	s.t.
4	Sep Vanmarcke (BEL)	LottoNL–Jumbo	+ 2"
5	Kristian Sbaragli (ITA)	MTN–Qhubeka	+ 3"
6	Leigh Howard (AUS)	Orica–GreenEDGE	+ 4"
7	Kenneth Van Rooy (BEL)	Lotto–Soudal	+ 28"
8	Fernando Gaviria (COL)	Etixx–Quick-Step	+ 49"
9	Moreno Hofland (NED)	LottoNL–Jumbo	+ 1' 00"
10	Yves Lampaert (BEL)	Etixx–Quick-Step	+ 1' 01"
