= 2017 RideLondon–Surrey Classic =

Cycling race

2017 UCI World Tour, race 28 of 37

Race details
- Dates: 30 July 2017
- Stages: 1
- Distance: 185.9 km (115.5 mi)
- Winning time: 4h 05' 41"

Results
| | Winner | Alexander Kristoff (NOR) | (Team Katusha–Alpecin) |
| | Second | Magnus Cort (DEN) | (Orica–Scott) |
| | Third | Michael Matthews (AUS) | (Team Sunweb) |

The 2017 Prudential RideLondon–Surrey Classic was a road cycling one-day race that took place on 30 July in London, England. It was the sixth edition of the London–Surrey Classic and was the twenty-eighth event of the 2017 UCI World Tour. It was the race's first appearance on the World Tour calendar.

The race was won in a sprint finish by Norway's Alexander Kristoff, riding for Team Katusha–Alpecin.

== Teams ==
As a new event to the UCI World Tour, all UCI WorldTeams were invited to the race, but not obligated to compete in the race. As such, fourteen of the eighteen WorldTeams elected to compete. Eight UCI Professional Continental teams competed, and thus completed the 22-team peloton.

UCI WorldTeams

- AG2R La Mondiale
- BMC Racing Team
- Bora–Hansgrohe
- Cannondale–Drapac
- Team Dimension Data
- Team Katusha–Alpecin
- LottoNL–Jumbo
- Lotto–Soudal
- Orica–Scott
- Quick-Step Floors
- Team Sky
- Team Sunweb
- Trek–Segafredo
- UAE Team Emirates

UCI Professional Continental teams

- Aqua Blue Sport
- Caja Rural–Seguros RGA
- CCC–Sprandi–Polkowice
- Israel Cycling Academy
- Sport Vlaanderen–Baloise
- Wanty–Groupe Gobert
- Wilier Triestina–Selle Italia
- Androni–Sidermec–Bottecchia

== Result ==
Result
| Rank | Rider | Team | Time |
|---|---|---|---|
| 1 | Alexander Kristoff (NOR) | Team Katusha–Alpecin | 4h 05' 42" |
| 2 | Magnus Cort (DEN) | Orica–Scott | + 0" |
| 3 | Michael Matthews (AUS) | Team Sunweb | + 0" |
| 4 | Sep Vanmarcke (BEL) | Cannondale–Drapac | + 0" |
| 5 | Wouter Wippert (NED) | Cannondale–Drapac | + 0" |
| 6 | Jempy Drucker (LUX) | BMC Racing Team | + 0" |
| 7 | Zak Dempster (AUS) | Israel Cycling Academy | + 0" |
| 8 | Sam Bennett (IRL) | Bora–Hansgrohe | + 0" |
| 9 | Rudy Barbier (FRA) | AG2R La Mondiale | + 0" |
| 10 | Oliver Naesen (BEL) | AG2R La Mondiale | + 0" |
