= 2018 RideLondon–Surrey Classic =

2018 UCI World Tour, race 26 of 37

Race details
- Dates: 29 July 2018
- Stages: 1
- Distance: 187 km (116.2 mi)
- Winning time: 4h 20' 10"

Results
	Winner	Pascal Ackermann (GER)	(Bora–Hansgrohe)
	Second	Elia Viviani (ITA)	(Quick-Step Floors)
	Third	Giacomo Nizzolo (ITA)	(Trek–Segafredo)

The 2018 Prudential RideLondon–Surrey Classic was a road cycling one-day race that took place on 29 July in London, England. It was the seventh edition of the London–Surrey Classic and was the twenty-sixth event of the 2018 UCI World Tour.

The race was won in a sprint finish by Germany's Pascal Ackermann, riding for Bora–Hansgrohe.

== Result ==
Result
Rank	Rider	Team	Time
1	Pascal Ackermann (GER)	Bora–Hansgrohe	4h 20' 10"
2	Elia Viviani (ITA)	Quick-Step Floors	+ 0"
3	Giacomo Nizzolo (ITA)	Trek–Segafredo	+ 0"
4	Iván García (ESP)	Bahrain–Merida	+ 0"
5	Simone Consonni (ITA)	UAE Team Emirates	+ 0"
6	Phil Bauhaus (GER)	Team Sunweb	+ 0"
7	Jean-Pierre Drucker (LUX)	BMC Racing Team	+ 0"
8	André Greipel (GER)	Lotto–Soudal	+ 0"
9	Jonas Koch (GER)	CCC–Sprandi–Polkowice	+ 0"
10	Rudy Barbier (FRA)	AG2R La Mondiale	+ 0"
