= Zak Dempster =

Australian racing cyclist

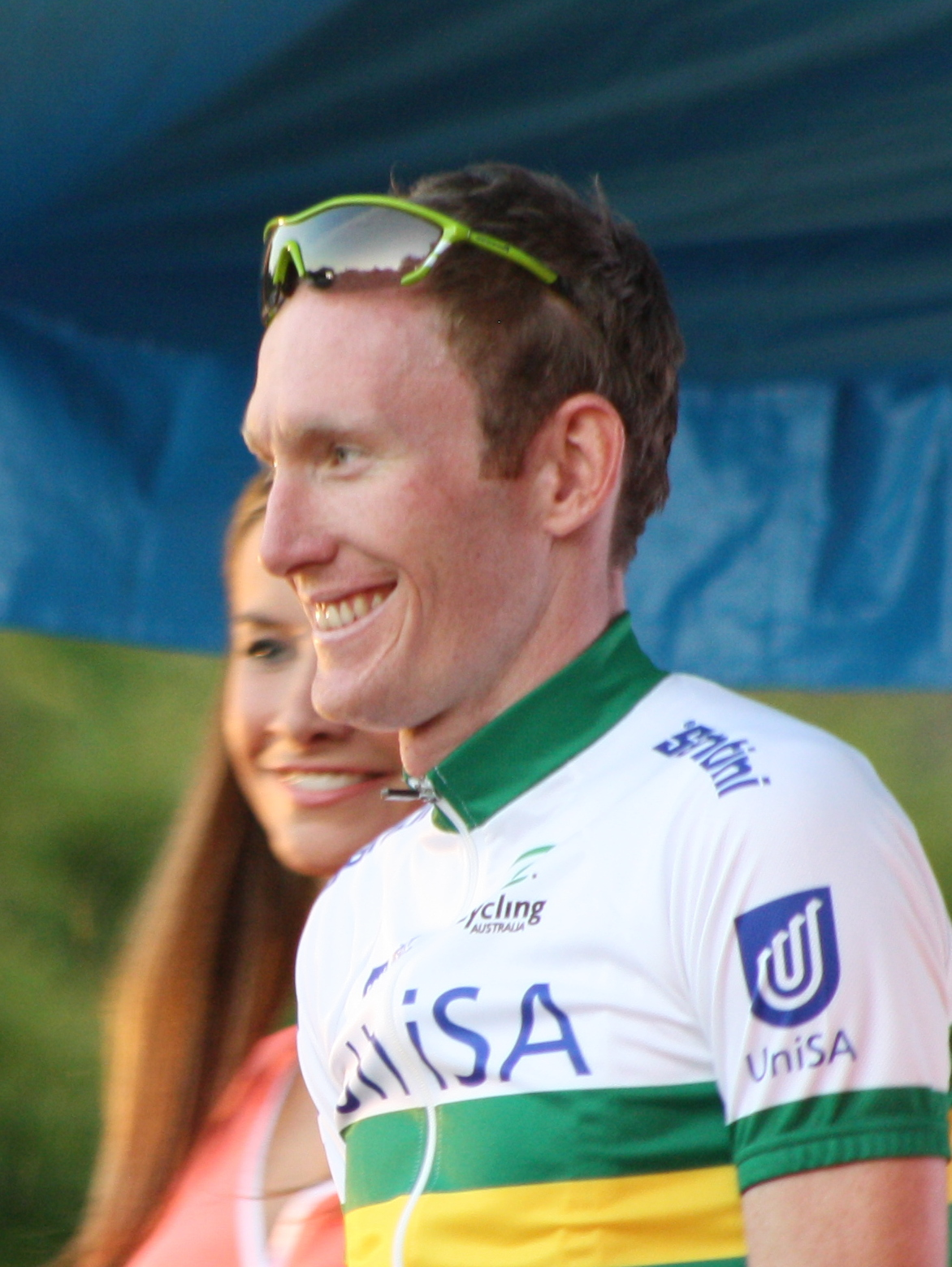
- Dempster at the 2013 Down Under Classic

Personal information
- Full name: Zakkari Dempster
- Born: 27 September 1987 (age 39) Castlemaine, Victoria, Australia
- Height: 1.90 m (6 ft 3 in)
- Weight: 77 kg (170 lb)

Cycling career
- Sport: Cycling
- Current team: Netcompany–Ineos
- Disciplines: Road; Track
- Role: Rider (retired); Directeur sportif
- Rider type: Sprinter/Classics rider (road); Endurance (track)

Amateur team
- 2009: Club Bourgas

Professional teams
- 2006: Drapac–Porsche
- 2007–2008: SouthAustralia.com–AIS
- 2009: Drapac–Porsche Cycling
- 2010–2011: Rapha Condor–Sharp
- 2011: HTC–Highroad (stagiaire)
- 2012: Endura Racing
- 2013–2016: NetApp–Endura
- 2017–2019: Israel Cycling Academy

Managerial team
- 2020–: Israel Cycling Academy

Zakkari Dempster (born 27 September 1987) is an Australian former professional racing cyclist, who competed professionally between 2006 and 2019 for the SouthAustralia.com–AIS, Drapac–Porsche Cycling, Rapha Condor–Sharp, Endura Racing, Bora–Argon 18 and Israel Cycling Academy teams. After retiring, Dempster now works as a directeur sportif for NSN Development Team, the development team for UCI WorldTeam NSN Cycling Team.

He was selected for the 2014 Tour de France finishing the race in 151st position on the general classification. Outside of cycling Dempster worked part-time as a fitness coach with Australian rules football team Carlton Football Club during the southern hemisphere summer between 2010 and 2013.

== Major results ==
2003
3rd team pursuit, National Novice Track Championships
3rd time trial, National Novice Road Championships
2004
Commonwealth Youth Games

1st individual pursuit
1st scratch
2nd points race

1st team pursuit, National Junior Track Championships
3rd team pursuit, National Track Championships
2005
National Junior Track Championships

1st individual pursuit
1st points race
2nd team pursuit
2nd Madison

2nd overall National Junior Road time trial Series
3rd team pursuit, UCI Juniors World Championships
2006
1st Bendigo Madison (with Mitchell Docker)
2nd team pursuit, National Track Championships
3rd points race, Oceania Track Championships
3rd time trial, Oceania Road Championships
2007
Oceania Track Championships

1st team pursuit
2nd scratch
2nd points race

1st Time trial, National Under-23 Road Championships
National Track Championships

1st scratch
1st team pursuit
2nd individual pursuit
3rd points race

1st overall Gippsland Tour

1st stage 5

3rd team pursuit, 2007–08 UCI Track Cycling World Cup Classics (Sydney)
2008
1st Melbourne to Warrnambool Classic
1st stage 1 Tour of Japan
3rd individual pursuit, National Track Championships
2009
1st team pursuit, Oceania Track Championships
5th overall Tour de Hokkaido
2011
1st overall Tour Doon Hame
1st Rutland–Melton International CiCLE Classic
1st Severn Bridge Road Race
5th overall Ronde de l'Oise

1st stage 1

2012
1st stage 2 Czech Cycling Tour
4th Tartu GP
9th Trofeo Palma de Mallorca
2013
6th RideLondon–Surrey Classic
2014
1st stage 1 Bay Classic Series
2016
6th Grand Prix of Aargau Canton
2017
7th London–Surrey Classic
2018
4th Ronde van Drenthe
7th Nokere Koerse
2019
1st Veenendaal–Veenendaal Classic
8th Omloop Mandel-Leie-Schelde
9th Schaal Sels

=== Grand Tour general classification results timeline ===
Grand Tour	2013	2014	2015	2016	2017	2018
Giro d'Italia	—	—	—	—	—	126
Tour de France	—	151	DNF	—	—	—
Vuelta a España	133	—	—	—	—	—

Legend
—	Did not compete
DNF	Did not finish
