= 2014 RideLondon–Surrey Classic =

2014 UCI Europe Tour
- Elevation Profile

Race details
- Dates: 10 August 2014
- Stages: 1
- Distance: 193.1 km (120.0 mi)
- Winning time: 4h 39' 53"

Results
	Winner	Adam Blythe (GBR)	(NFTO)
	Second	Ben Swift (GBR)	(Team Sky)
	Third	Julian Alaphilippe (FRA)	(Omega Pharma–Quick-Step)

The 2014 RideLondon–Surrey Classic (also known as the 2014 Prudential RideLondon–Surrey Classic for sponsorship reasons) was the 2nd edition of the RideLondon–Surrey Classic one-day cycling race. It was held on 10 August 2014 as a 1.HC category event within the 2014 UCI Europe Tour.

== Route ==
The detailed profile of the Coldharbour/Leith Hill loop as featured in the 2014 Prudential RideLondon–Surrey Classic

The detailed profile of the Denbies Wine Estate loop as featured in the 2014 Prudential RideLondon–Surrey Classic

Following the inaugural running of the RideLondon–Surrey Classic the 193.1 km (120 mi) route chosen for the 2014 edition incorporates a number of changes. The route features five categorised climbs and four intermediate sprint points.

The biggest changes relate to the Surrey section where local residents complained about the lengthy road closures put in place for the 2013 edition; where possible, the road closures for the 2014 edition will be managed by rolling road closures to limit the impact of the race on the local community.

The climb of Newlands Corner has been substituted for Staple Lane in order to route the race further from Guildford. The Leith Hill loop (traversed three times in 2013) has been replaced with two different loops centred on Dorking - riders will tackle Leith Hill (via Coldharbour) once and Denbies Wine Estate twice. The riders will race through the centre of Dorking four times, rather than once in 2013. With three categorised climbs in the vicinity and two intermediate sprint points in the town centre, Dorking was expected to become a focal point for spectators.

The route back to London, which still features the climb of Box Hill, was routed via Oxshott rather than Cobham. Minor changes to the route in Kingston upon Thames have been included in order to showcase the recently redeveloped ancient Market Place.

Both the climb of Staple Lane and Oxshott were used in the routes of the Olympic Road Cycling races in 2012.

=== Sprints classification ===
There are four Intermediate Sprints that count towards the sprints classification:

Sprint	Race distance
Hampton Court Palace	33.8 km (21.0 mi)
Dorking (2nd Passage)	98.6 km (61.3 mi)
Dorking (4th Passage)	135.0 km (83.9 mi)
Wimbledon Village	178.6 km (111.0 mi)

Note that points are not awarded at the finish line.

=== King of the Mountains classification ===
There are five categorised climbs that count towards the King of the Mountains classification:

Climb	Race distance	Category	Length	Ascent	Average grade	Max. grade
Staple Lane	66.3 km (41.2 mi)	Cat 2	1.4 km (0.9 mi)	82 m (269 ft)	5.9%	9.9%
Leith Hill (via Coldharbour)	84.2 km (52.3 mi)	Cat 2	1.8 km (1.1 mi)	130 m (427 ft)	7.2%	14.2%
Denbies Wine Estate (1st Passage)	103.6 km (64.4 mi)	Cat 2	2.5 km (1.6 mi)	137 m (449 ft)	5.5%	13.1%
Denbies Wine Estate (2nd Passage)	121.8 km (75.7 mi)	Cat 2	2.5 km (1.6 mi)	137 m (449 ft)	5.5%	13.1%
Box Hill	141.0 km (87.6 mi)	Cat 2	2.5 km (1.6 mi)	123 m (404 ft)	4.9%	10.9%

== Teams ==
25 teams were invited to the 2014 RideLondon–Surrey Classic: 7 UCI ProTeams, 5 UCI Pro Continental Teams, 12 UCI Continental Teams along with the British national team.

Each of the 25 teams are due to enter six riders to the race, making up a starting peloton of 150 riders.

The 25 teams that will compete in the race are:

UCI ProTeams
- Belkin Pro Cycling
- BMC Racing Team
- Cannondale
- Omega Pharma–Quick-Step
- Orica–GreenEDGE
- Giant–Shimano
- Team Sky
UCI Pro Continental Teams
- Colombia
- MTN–Qhubeka
- NetApp–Endura
- Topsport Vlaanderen–Baloise
- Wanty–Groupe Gobert
UCI Continental Teams
- An Post–Chain Reaction
- Madison Genesis
- NFTO Pro Cycling
- Velosure–Giordana
- Rapha Condor–JLT
- Synergy Baku Cycling Project
- Team 3M
- Team La Pomme Marseille 13
- Team Raleigh
- Bike Aid - Ride for Help
- Team Kuota
- Metec - TKH Continental Cyclingteam
National Teams
- Great Britain Cycling Team

== Race report ==
The race was held in wet and windy conditions due to the passing of ex-Hurricane Bertha, with standing water and debris on the country lanes causing several punctures and accidents to riders. A 6-man breakaway formed through Richmond Park and contested the first 3 KOMs. Their lead varied between 1 1/2 and 2 1/2 minutes. Team Sky lead the peloton and upped the pace on the first climb of Denbies, fracturing the peloton and allowing the early break to be caught soon after. The second Denbies climb was animated by attacks from the likes of Phillip Gilbert and Gert Steegmans, creating a new lead group. Cannondale took up the attempts to pace the peloton back to the front through the final climb of Box Hill, but made little gain. As the leaders headed home for London, further increases in pace left a select group of 5 riders who would contest the victory. Gilbert and Julian Alaphilippe briefly went clear through Wimbledon, but Ben Swift, Adam Blythe and Kristijan Koren rode back to them to set up a final sprint down The Mall. Blythe, at the back of the line of riders, went first with a decisive sprint, Swift followed but was unable to beat him. Alaphilippe took third place, with the remnants of the break arriving soon after, with the peloton contesting a bunch sprint for top ten placings. Soon after the race Adam Blythe signed for the 2015 season for Orica Green-Edge.

== Results ==
	Cyclist	Team	Time
1	Adam Blythe (GBR)	NFTO	4h 39' 53"
2	Ben Swift (GBR)	Team Sky	+ 0"
3	Julian Alaphilippe (FRA)	Omega Pharma–Quick-Step	+ 1"
4	Philippe Gilbert (BEL)	BMC Racing Team	+ 1"
5	Kristijan Koren (SLO)	Cannondale	+ 3"
6	Sam Bennett (IRL)	NetApp–Endura	+ 12"
7	Loïc Vliegen (BEL)	BMC Racing Team	+ 13"
8	Stef Clement (NED)	Belkin Pro Cycling	+ 13"
9	Elia Viviani (ITA)	Cannondale	+ 31"
10	Russell Downing (GBR)	NFTO	+ 31"
