= Adam Blythe =

British racing cyclist

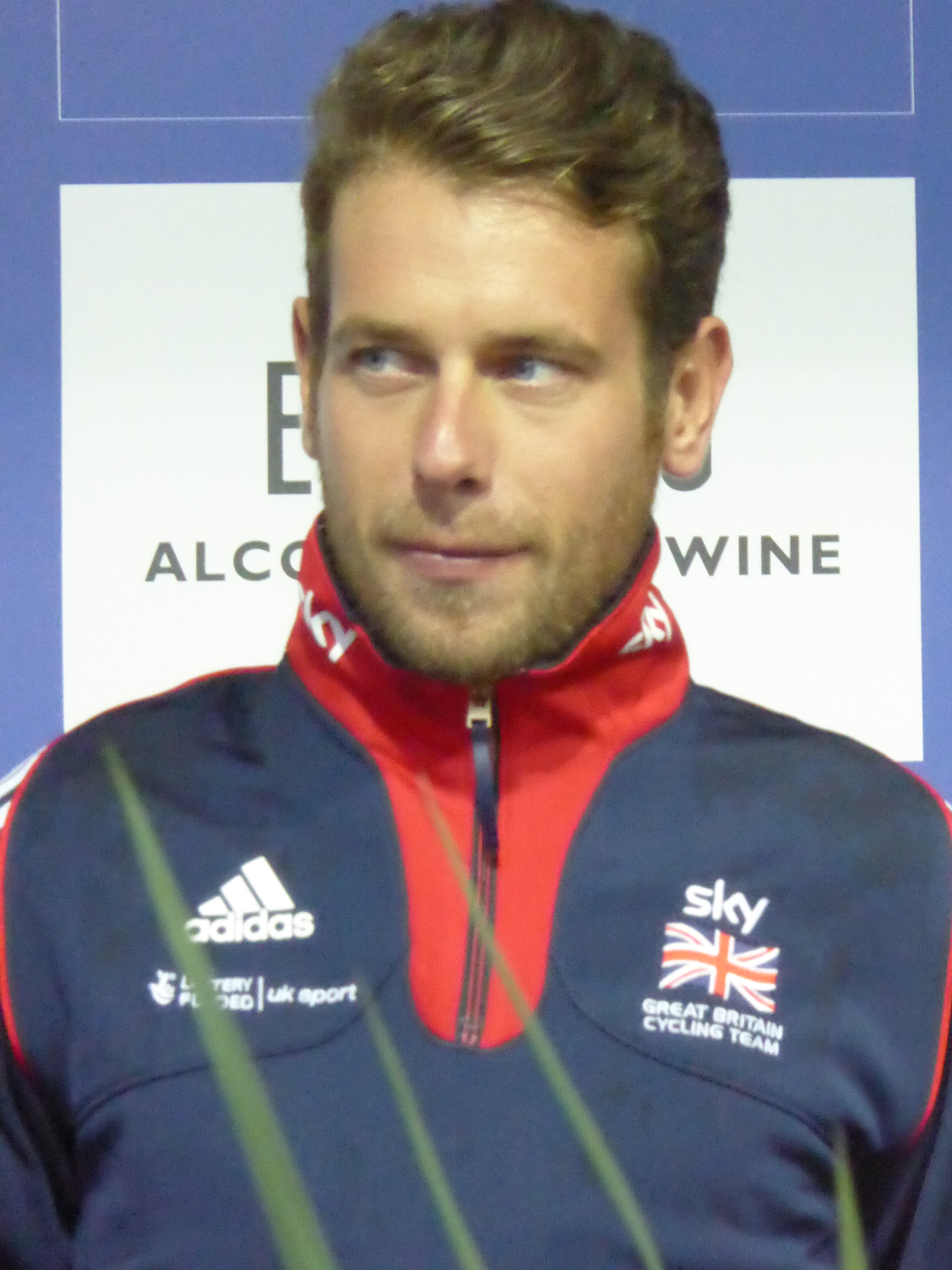
- Blythe in 2016

Personal information
- Full name: Adam Michael Blythe
- Nickname: Tyrone
- Born: 1 October 1989 (age 37) Sheffield, England
- Height: 1.75 m (5 ft 9 in)
- Weight: 68 kg (150 lb; 10.7 st)

Cycling career
- Sport: Cycling
- Current team: Retired
- Disciplines: Road; Track
- Role: Rider
- Rider type: Sprinter; Puncheur

Amateur teams
- ?: Sheffield Phoenix
- 2007: ScienceinSport–Trek
- 2008: Pinarello
- 2008: Wielerclub Des Sprinters Malderen
- 2008: Team Konica Minolta–Bizhub
- 2009: DAVO
- 2009: Silence–Lotto (stagiaire)

Professional teams
- 2010–2011: Omega Pharma–Lotto
- 2012–2013: BMC Racing Team
- 2014: NFTO
- 2015: Orica–GreenEDGE
- 2016: Tinkoff
- 2017–2018: Aqua Blue Sport
- 2019: Lotto–Soudal

Major wins
- One-day races and Classics National Road Race Championships (2016) London–Surrey Classic (2014)

Adam Michael Blythe (born 1 October 1989) is an English former professional road and track racing cyclist, who competed professionally between 2010 and 2019 for the BMC Racing Team, NFTO, Orica–GreenEDGE, Tinkoff, Aqua Blue Sport and Lotto–Soudal teams. Blythe began racing at a young age and went on to become a member of British Cycling's Olympic Development Programme.

== Amateur career ==
Born in Sheffield, Blythe began cycling at a young age with the Sheffield Phoenix club. Cycling was a family activity, his sister Kimberley Blythe was also fairly successful as a young rider.

Blythe became Derbyshire's Junior Sportsman of the Year in the East Midlands Sports Personality of the Year Awards, 2005.

Blythe left British Cycling's Academy Programme by mutual consent in February 2008, and went to race in Belgium. He stayed with the ex-professional cyclist, Tim Harris, in Westmeerbeek, near Antwerp. Blythe was awarded a Cycling Time Trials scholarship to enable him to race on the continent and develop further. He raced for the Wielerclub Des Sprinters Malderen which is a feeder club for a professional team. He also received support from the Dave Rayner Fund during his time in Belgium.

== Professional career ==
Blythe returned to Belgium to ride for the DAVO squad in 2009, under the tutelage of Kurt Van De Wouwer, a former professional. He had joined pro-tour team Silence–Lotto as a trainee in July 2009, it was announced on 7 September 2009 that he had signed a two-year contract with Silence-Lotto in the wake of a string of good results for the team.

In 2012, Blythe followed his teammate and close friend Philippe Gilbert to the BMC Racing Team. In October 2012, Blythe sprinted his way to victory in the semi-classic Binche–Tournai–Binche, popping out of his teammate's wheel on a cobbled sector with 700 metres (2,300 ft) to go, edging Adrien Petit (Cofidis) and John Degenkolb of Argos–Shimano.

In 2014, Blythe rode for the newly formed British NFTO team. After a very successful year competing on the British domestic scene, Blythe joined Australian team Orica–GreenEDGE for the 2015 season. After one season there in August 2015 it was announced that Blythe would be moving to Tinkoff for the 2016 season, where he would be reunited with directeur sportif Sean Yates, who worked with Blythe during his time with NFTO.

With Tinkoff folding at the end of 2016, Blythe joined the Aqua Blue Sport squad for its inaugural season in 2017. Following the announcement of Aqua Blue Sport's collapse, in September 2018 Blythe announced that he would return to Lotto–Soudal for the 2019 season, linking up with former Orica–GreenEDGE teammate Caleb Ewan as part of the latter's sprint train, with an additional role as a domestique for the team's classics squad.

In October 2019, Blythe announced that he would retire at the end of the season.

== Post-racing career ==
Blythe is a pundit for Eurosport's coverage of cycling, having worked part-time in this role on the channel's coverage of the Grand Tours during his final professional season in 2019. He was also "on-site" reporter for NBC Sports' coverage of the 2020 Tour de France, and fulfilled that role again in 2021.

In November 2019, Blythe announced that he was taking up a role with David Millar's cycling clothing brand CHPT3 as a product marketing executive.

== Personal life ==
He currently lives in Bollington, Cheshire, England.

== Major results ==
=== Road ===
2006
3rd National Criterium Championships
2007
1st Overall Driedaagse van Axel

1st Sprints classification
1st Points classification
1st Combination classification
1st Stages 1 & 4

1st Kuurne–Brussels–Kuurne Juniores
6th Paris–Roubaix Juniors
2008
Tour of Hong Kong Shanghai

1st Stages 2 & 3b

2009
1st Circuit du Port de Dunkerque
1st Stage 7 Thüringen Rundfahrt der U23
2nd Grote 1-MeiPrijs
5th Antwerpse Havenpijl
2010 (4 pro wins)
1st Overall Circuit Franco-Belge

1st Points classification
1st Young rider classification
1st Stages 1 & 3

1st Nationale Sluitingsprijs
3rd Omloop van het Houtland
4th Grand Prix de Fourmies
4th Schaal Sels
2011
2nd Houtem–Vilvoorde
3rd Grote Prijs Stad Zottegem
4th Overall Ronde van Drenthe

1st Young rider classification

7th Overall Tour de Wallonie-Picarde
2012 (2)
1st Binche–Tournai–Binche
1st Stage 1 Paris–Corrèze
2nd Omloop van het Houtland
3rd Handzame Classic
4th Grand Prix d'Isbergues
10th Overall Tour of Qatar
2013
4th Overall Tour of Qatar

1st Stage 2 (TTT)

2014 (1)
1st National Criterium Championships
1st RideLondon–Surrey Classic
1st Otley GP
1st Ipswich and Coastal GP
1st Circuit of the Fens
1st Jersey International Road Race
2nd Beverley GP
3rd Beaumont Trophy
6th Rutland–Melton International CiCLE Classic
2015
2nd Stafford GP
3rd Overall Tour de Korea
2016 (1)
1st Road race, National Championships
2017
2nd Nokere Koerse
2nd Handzame Classic
4th Ronde van Drenthe
2018 (1)
1st Elfstedenronde
2nd Road race, National Championships
5th Handzame Classic
7th Ronde van Limburg
9th Three Days of Bruges–De Panne

==== Grand Tour general classification results timeline ====
Grand Tour	2010	2011	2012	2013	2014	2015	2016	2017
Giro d'Italia	DNF	DNF	—	166	—	—	—	—
Tour de France	Did not contest during his career							
Vuelta a España	—	—	—	—	—	—	—	155

Legend
—	Did not compete
DNF	Did not finish

=== Track ===
2006
1st Team pursuit, UEC European Junior Championships
National Junior Championships

1st Scratch
2nd Points race

2nd Madison, National Championships (with Matthew Rowe)
2007
1st Team pursuit, UEC European Junior Championships
1st Madison, National Championships (with Luke Rowe)
1st UIV Cup, Six Days of Ghent (with Peter Kennaugh)
National Junior Championships

2nd Scratch
3rd Points race

2013
2nd Madison, National Championships (with Peter Kennaugh)
2014
2nd Team pursuit, National Championships
