= Yannick Martinez =

French cyclist

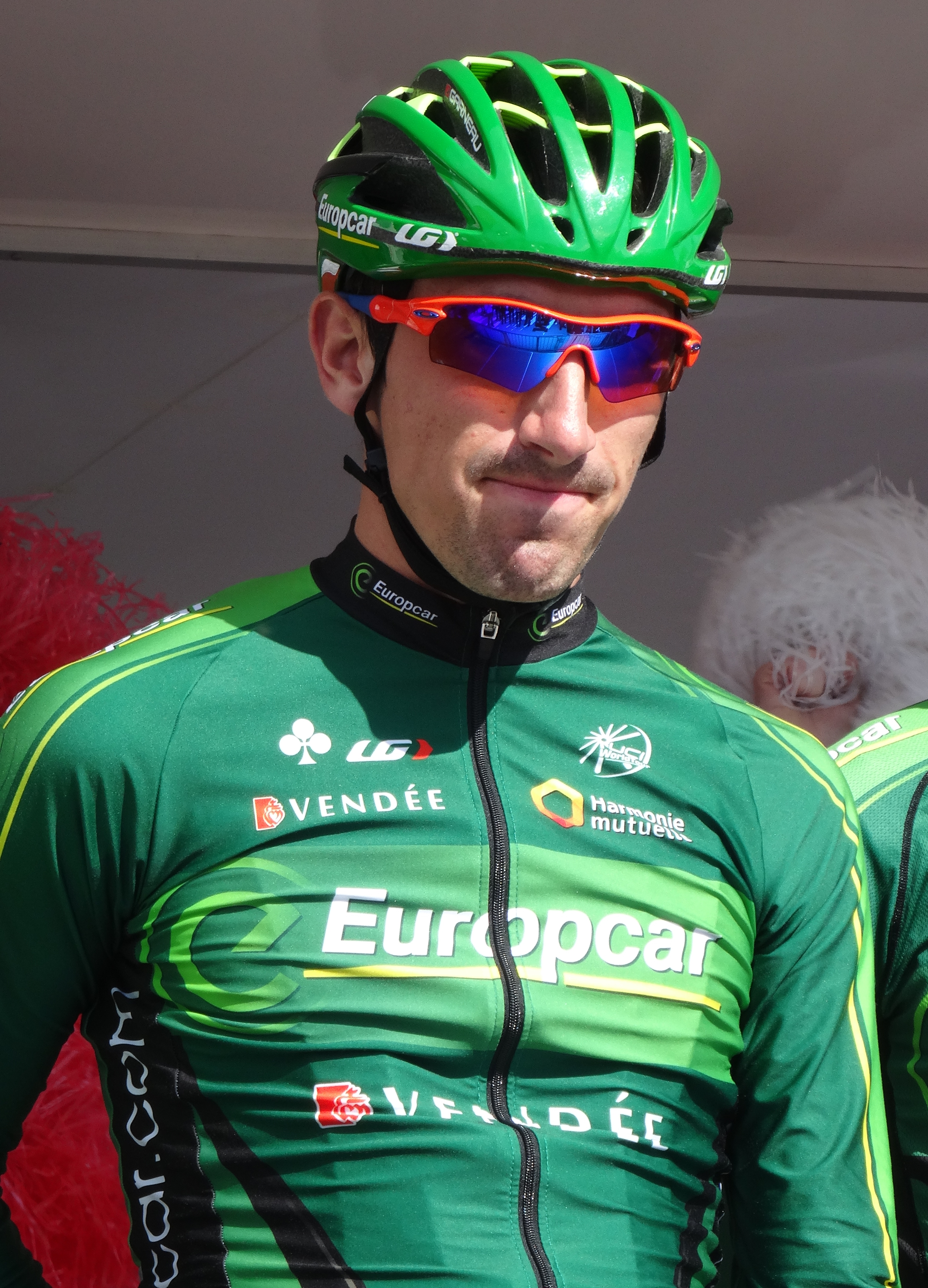
- Martinez at the 2014 Grand Prix de Denain

Personal information
- Full name: Yannick Martinez
- Born: 4 May 1988 (age 38) Nevers, France
- Height: 1.76 m (5 ft 9 1/2 in)
- Weight: 73 kg (161 lb)

Cycling career
- Sport: Cycling
- Current team: Amateur élite
- Disciplines: Road; Cyclo-cross
- Role: Rider
- Rider type: Sprinter (road); Cyclo-cross

Amateur teams
- 2008–2011: Creusot Cycling
- 2019–: Guidon Chalettois
- 2023-2025: Team Atria

Professional teams
- 2011: Ag2r–La Mondiale (stagiaire)
- 2012–2013: La Pomme Marseille
- 2014–2015: Team Europcar
- 2016–2018: Delko–Marseille Provence KTM

Yannick Martinez (born 4 May 1988) is a French road and cyclo-cross cyclist, who currently rides amateur. He is the younger brother of 2000 Olympic cross-country mountain biking champion Miguel Martinez, the son of Mariano Martínez, and the uncle of Lenny Martinez.

== Major results ==
2009
1st Val d'Ille Classic
5th Road race, UEC European Under-23 Road Championships
2011
6th Tour de la Somme
2012
8th Overall Tour of Taihu Lake
8th Tour du Doubs
9th Grand Prix d'Isbergues
9th Paris–Bourges
2013
1st Stage 5 Four Days of Dunkirk
1st Stage 1 Route du Sud
2nd Boucles de l'Aulne
3rd RideLondon–Surrey Classic
5th Overall Tour du Limousin
5th Grand Prix de Plumelec-Morbihan
6th Overall Tour of Taihu Lake
6th Grand Prix d'Isbergues
7th Tour de Vendée
8th Polynormande
10th Tour du Finistère
2014
3rd Tour de la Somme
5th La Roue Tourangelle
8th Overall Four Days of Dunkirk
9th Scheldeprijs
10th Boucles de l'Aulne
2017
7th La Roue Tourangelle
