= London–Surrey Classic =

Men's professional cycle race in London

RideLondon–Surrey Classic

Race details
- Date: August
- Region: Great Britain
- Discipline: Road
- Competition: UCI World Tour (Cat 1.HC)
- Type: One-day
- Organiser: London & Surrey Cycling Partnership (LSCP)
- Web site: www.prudentialridelondon.co.uk

History
- First edition: 2011
- Editions: 8
- Final edition: 2019
- First winner: Mark Cavendish (GBR)
- Final winner: Elia Viviani (ITA)

The London–Surrey Classic (also known as the RideLondon–Surrey Classic) was an annual 193 km (119.9 mi) men's professional one-day road cycling race, starting and finishing in London and routed via the picturesque Surrey Hills. The first race of its kind was the London–Surrey Cycle Classic, on 14 August 2011, a 1.2 classification 140 km preparatory event for the 2012 Summer Olympics, which was won by sprinter Mark Cavendish. The men's and women's Olympic road races were held on a longer variation of the same course the following year. On 4 August 2013, the race found a permanent home as part of the Prudential RideLondon weekend, a two-day cycling festival held in London, a legacy event of the Olympics.

The Prudential RideLondon–Surrey Classic was part of the UCI World Tour between 2017 and 2019. Following the cancellation of the 2020 and 2021 events due to the COVID-19 pandemic and the withdrawal of support from Surrey County Council, the men's race did not return in 2022, with the RideLondon festival including a 3 day elite women's race (RideLondon Classique) instead.

== History ==
=== Origins ===
As part of the London Prepares test events for London 2012 Olympics and Paralympics a one-off one-day 140 km (87.0 mi) cycle race was organised for 14 August 2011 acting as a test event for the Road Cycling events to be held the following year. The race was named the London-Surrey Cycle Classic and was part of the 2010–11 UCI Europe Tour as a 1.2 category event.

The race started and finished on The Mall in London and featured two laps of a 15.5 km (9.6 mi) circuit centred on Box Hill in Surrey. 138 riders from 19 national teams and 10 trade teams took part in the race, and was won by Mark Cavendish in a sprint finish.

=== 2012 Summer Olympics ===
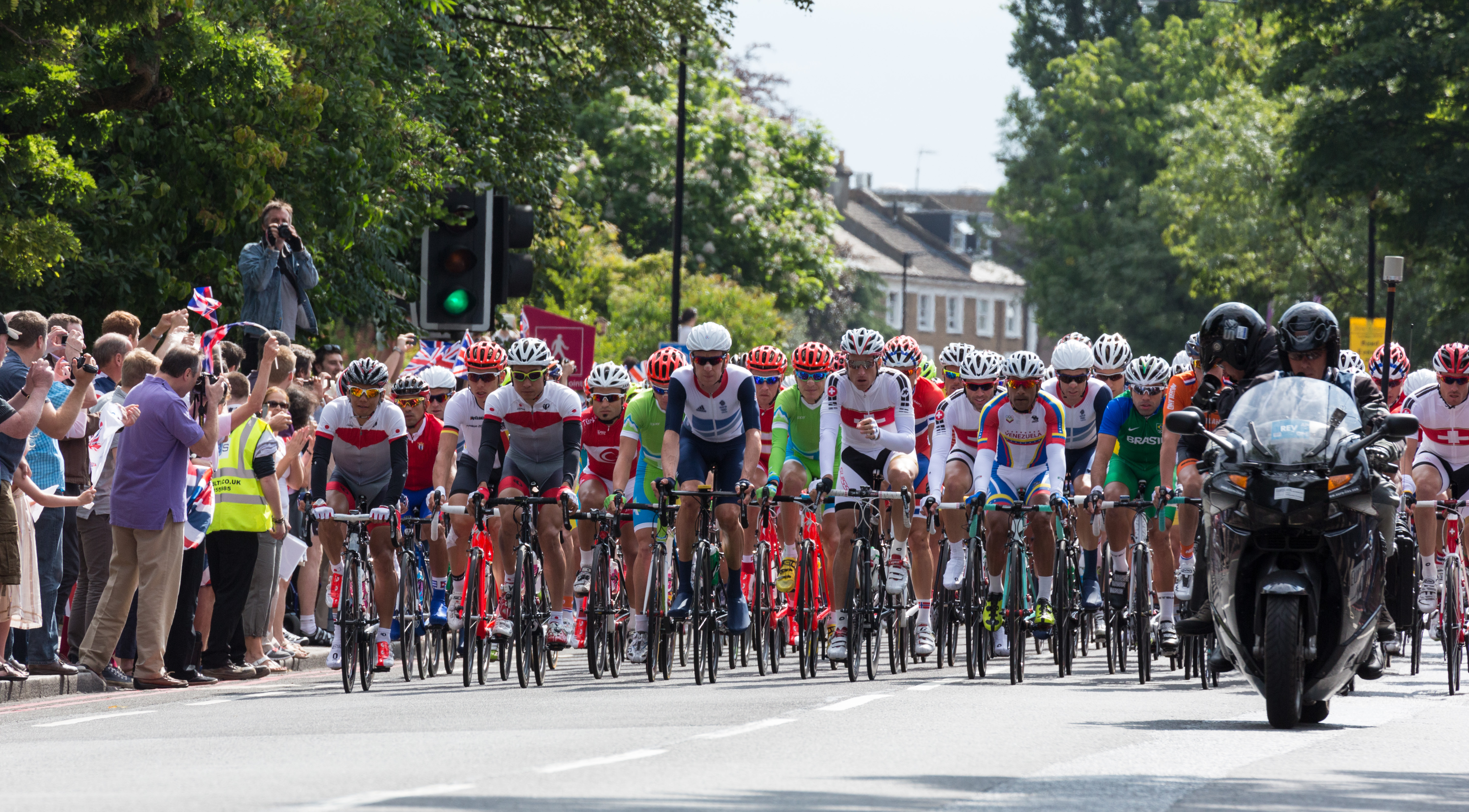
The peloton of the Men's Olympic Road Race in Southwest London.

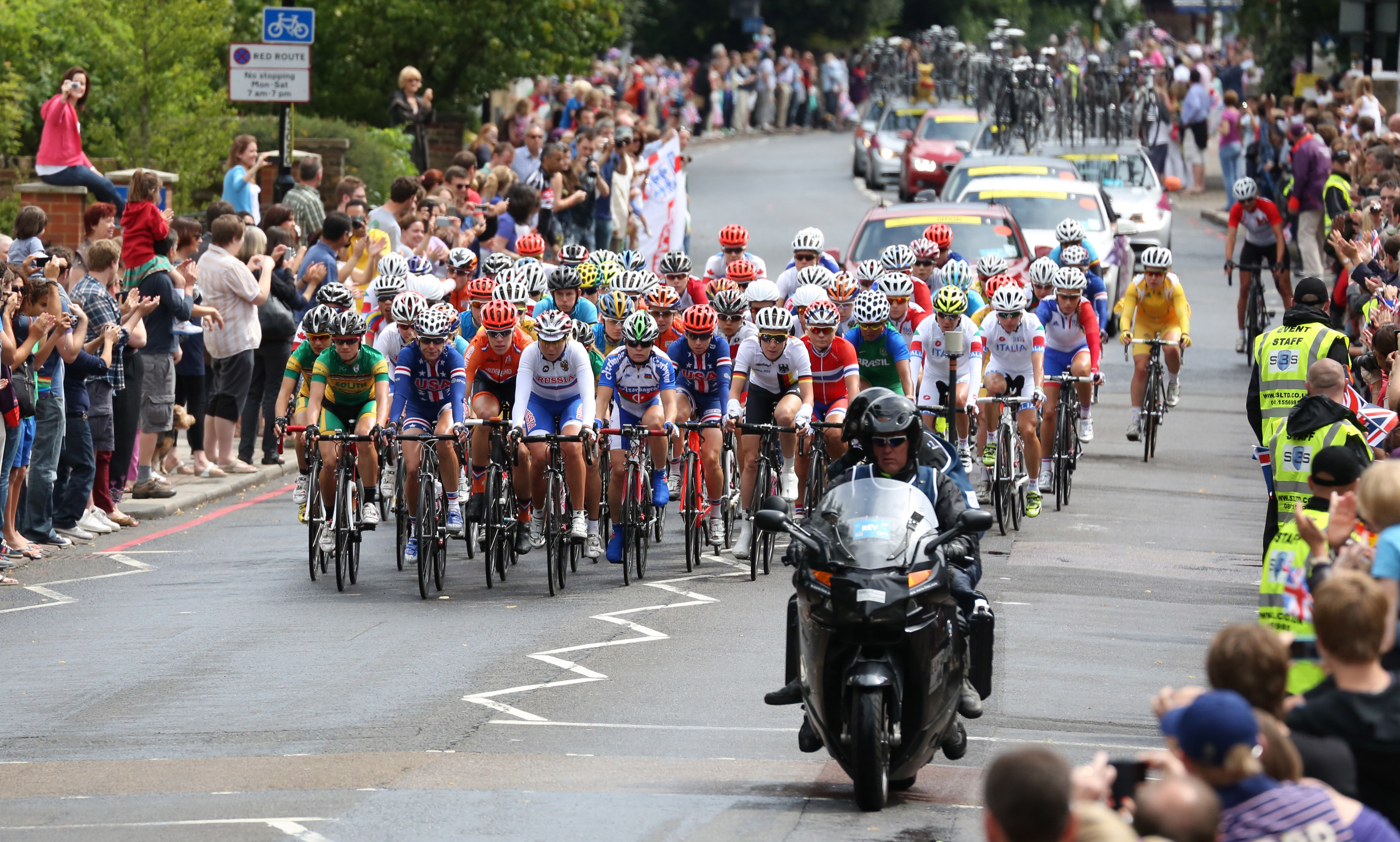
The peloton of the Women's Olympic Road Race in Southwest London.

The 2012 Summer Olympics held road cycling races for both men and women on a largely similar course to that of the London-Surrey Cycle Classic held the previous year.

=== RideLondon–Surrey Classic ===
The RideLondon weekend, including the RideLondon–Surrey Classic, was announced by the Mayor of London Boris Johnson on 10 August 2012, less than two weeks after the Olympic Road Cycling races. RideLondon is managed by the London & Surrey Cycling Partnership, a joint venture between the organisers of the London Marathon and The Tour of Britain.

The inaugural RideLondon–Surrey Classic was run as a 1.1 category event on the 2013 UCI Europe Tour. The UCI upgraded the classification for the 2014 race which was run as a 1.HC category event on the 2014 UCI Europe Tour; the same classification as Paris–Tours and Milano–Torino.

=== UCI World Tour status ===
The RideLondon event director, Hugh Brasher, stated his ambitions to attain UCI World Tour status for the RideLondon–Surrey Classic by 2016. This was backed up by positive rider reaction following the inaugural race, including from Arnaud Démare's teammate Dominique Rollin. In March 2016 the race organisation applied for WorldTour status from the 2017 event and in August 2016 the UCI confirmed that the race would be promoted to the WorldTour from 2017. Surrey County Council agreed to support the RideLondon events until 2018, with an option of a further two-year extension.

=== Cancellation ===
The 2020 and 2021 events were cancelled due to the COVID-19 pandemic. Following the withdrawal of title sponsor Prudential and Surrey County Council, the event has concentrated in Central London from 2022 with an 3-day elite women's race, the RideLondon Classique. In June 2021, organisers of the event confirmed that the men's race would not return.

== Route ==
The profile of the 2013 Prudential RideLondon–Surrey Classic

The profile of the 2014 Prudential RideLondon–Surrey Classic

The RideLondon–Surrey Classic route was a variation of the course used for the 2012 Summer Olympics. The route featured both categorised climbs and intermediate sprint points.

Riders started from the Queen Elizabeth Olympic Park close to the Olympic Velodrome before passing close to Canary Wharf and the Tower of London on the way through central London. Leaving London by the A4 the route passes through Richmond Park, Kingston upon Thames and Hampton Court Palace. In Surrey the route passed through Weybridge and Ripley on the way to the first of the categorised climbs and the leafy villages of the Surrey Hills.

Multiple laps of hilly terrain in the vicinity of Dorking incorporated further categorised climbs, including Leith Hill – the highest point in South-East England. On the return to London the route took in the final categorised climb of Box Hill before the largely flat run-in via Oxshott, Kingston upon Thames, Wimbledon and Putney. The final kilometres followed the Embankment, past the Palace of Westminster, along Whitehall and turning left through Admiralty Arch before the finish on The Mall.

=== Sprints classification ===
Intermediate Sprints counted towards the sprints classification; the points distribution for this classification is as follows:

Sprint	1st	2nd	3rd	4th
Intermediate Sprint	5	3	2	1

Note that points were not awarded at the finish line.

=== King of the Mountains classification ===
Categorised climbs counted towards the King of the Mountains classification; the points distribution for this classification is as follows:

Category	1st	2nd	3rd	4th	5th	6th	7th	8th	9th	10th
Cat 1	10	9	8	7	6	5	4	3	2	1
Cat 2	6	5	4	3	2	1				
Cat 3	4	3	2	1						

The categorised climbs that featured in the RideLondon–Surrey Classic included:

Climb	Editions	Category	Length	Ascent	Average grade	Max. grade
Box Hill	2013-2014	Cat 2	2.5 km (1.6 mi)	123 m (404 ft)	4.9%	10.9%
Coldharbour	2014	Cat 2	1.8 km (1.1 mi)	130 m (427 ft)	7.2%	14.2%
Denbies Wine Estate	2014	Cat 2	2.5 km (1.6 mi)	137 m (449 ft)	5.5%	13.1%
Newlands Corner	2013	Cat 3	1.8 km (1.1 mi)	84 m (276 ft)	4.7%	9.6%
Staple Lane	2014	Cat 2	1.4 km (0.9 mi)	82 m (269 ft)	5.9%	9.9%
Leith Hill	2013	Cat 2	2.1 km (1.3 mi)	139 m (456 ft)	6.6%	11.8%

== Winners ==
=== Overall winners ===
Year	Country	Rider	Team
2011	Great Britain	Mark Cavendish	Great Britain national team
2012	No race (see 2012 Olympic road race)		
2013	France	Arnaud Démare	FDJ.fr
2014	Great Britain	Adam Blythe	NFTO
2015	Luxembourg	Jempy Drucker	BMC Racing Team
2016	Belgium	Tom Boonen	Etixx–Quick-Step
2017	Norway	Alexander Kristoff	Team Katusha–Alpecin
2018	Germany	Pascal Ackermann	Bora–Hansgrohe
2019	Italy	Elia Viviani	Deceuninck–Quick-Step
2020	No race due to COVID-19 pandemic		
2021	No race due to COVID-19 pandemic		

=== Overall winners by nationality ===
# of victories	Country
2	United Kingdom
1	France
1	Luxembourg
1	Belgium
1	Norway
1	Germany
1	Italy

=== Sprints classification winners ===
Year	Country	Rider	Team
2013	Netherlands	Ramon Sinkeldam	Argos–Shimano
2014	Netherlands	Steven Lammertink	Giant–Shimano
2015	Great Britain	Peter Williams	ONE Pro Cycling
2016	Spain	Jonathan Lastra	Caja Rural–Seguros RGA
2017	Italy	Matteo Trentin	Quick-Step Floors
2018	Italy	Manuele Boaro	Bahrain–Merida

=== King of the Mountains classification winners ===
Year	Country	Rider	Team
2013	Netherlands	Ramon Sinkeldam	Argos–Shimano
2014	Great Britain	Steve Lampier	Velosure–Giordana
2015	Great Britain	Erick Rowsell	Madison Genesis
2016	Luxembourg	Jempy Drucker	BMC Racing Team
2017	Denmark	Mads Würtz Schmidt	Team Katusha–Alpecin
2018	France	Alexis Gougeard	AG2R La Mondiale
2019	Great Britain	Alex Dowsett	Team Katusha–Alpecin

=== Records ===
- The fastest RideLondon–Surrey Classic was in 2017, by Alexander Kristoff at a speed of 45.39 km/h (28.20 mph).
- The highest number of finishers was in 2013 – 131 out of 147 starters completed the course within the time limit.
