= Alexander Kristoff =

Norwegian road bicycle racer (born 1987)

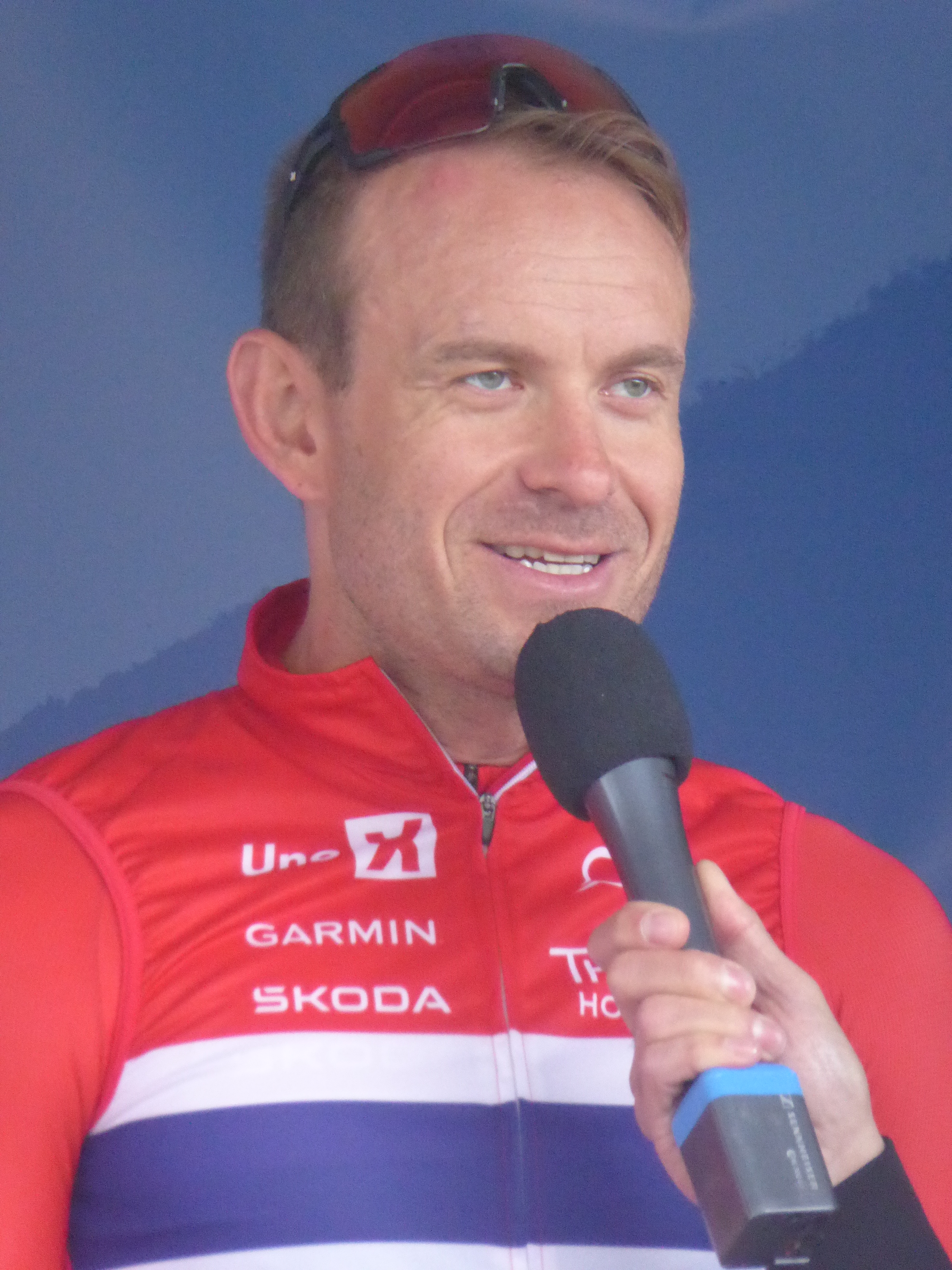
- Kristoff at the 2023 UCI Road World Championships

Personal information
- Full name: Alexander Kristoff
- Nickname: The Stavanger Stallion
- Born: 5 July 1987 (age 39) Oslo, Norway
- Height: 1.81 m (5 ft 11 1/2 in)
- Weight: 78 kg (172 lb; 12 st 4 lb)

Cycling career
- Sport: Cycling
- Discipline: Road
- Role: Rider (retired)
- Rider type: Sprinter; Classics specialist

Professional teams
- 2006: Glud & Marstrand–Horsens
- 2007–2009: Maxbo–Bianchi
- 2010–2011: BMC Racing Team
- 2012–2017: Team Katusha
- 2018–2021: UAE Team Emirates
- 2022: Intermarché–Wanty–Gobert Matériaux
- 2023–2025: Uno-X Pro Cycling Team

Major wins
- Grand Tours Tour de France 4 individual stages (2014, 2018, 2020) Stage races Three Days of De Panne (2015) Tour of Norway (2019) One-day races and Classics European Road Race Championships (2017) National Road Race Championships (2007, 2011) Milan–San Remo (2014) Tour of Flanders (2015) Gent–Wevelgem (2019) Hamburg Cyclassics (2014) GP Ouest-France (2015) Eschborn–Frankfurt (2014, 2016, 2017, 2018) Scheldeprijs (2015, 2022) London–Surrey Classic (2017) Grand Prix of Aargau Canton (2015, 2018, 2019) Clásica de Almería (2022) Circuit Franco-Belge (2022)
Medal record
Representing Norway
Men's road bicycle racing
Olympic Games
Bronze medal – third place	2012 London	Road race
World Championships
Silver medal – second place	2017 Bergen	Road race
European Championships
Gold medal – first place	2017 Herning	Road race

Alexander Kristoff (born 5 July 1987) is a Norwegian former road bicycle racer, who last rode for UCI ProTeam Uno-X Mobility and competed professionally from 2006 to 2025.

A sprinter and classics rider, Kristoff is the most successful Norwegian cyclist by number of wins, having taken almost 100 victories during his professional career. He has won four Tour de France stages, the 2014 Milan–San Remo and 2015 Tour of Flanders one-day races – as a result, becoming the only Norwegian rider, as of 2026, to win a cycling monument – and has won medals in the road race at the Olympic Games (2012; bronze), the UCI Road World Championships (2017; silver), and the European Road Cycling Championships (2017; gold). He also holds the record for most wins at the one-day races Eschborn–Frankfurt (four) and the Grand Prix of Aargau Canton (three), and most stage wins at the Tour of Oman (nine), the Tour of Norway (eleven), and the Arctic Race of Norway (seven).

== Career ==
=== Early career ===
At the age of six, he moved from Oslo to Stavanger. His stepfather got him interested in cycling rather than football. He started riding for Stavanger SK. At 16 he won the Norwegian National Road Race Championships in the youth category, and finished fourth at the European Youth Summer Olympic Festival. He turned professional in 2006 with Glud & Marstrand–Horsens. In 2007, he won the Norwegian National Road Race Championships at 19, beating Thor Hushovd in a sprint of four riders. He won a stage at the Ringerike GP in both 2008 and 2009, and finished second to Kurt Asle Arvesen in the National Road Race Championships in 2009.

=== BMC Racing Team (2010–2011) ===
Kristoff joined the BMC Racing Team, a UCI Professional Continental team, for the 2010 season. In his first season with the team, his best result was a third-place finish at the Philadelphia International Championship. The following year, he took his first victory with the team, winning the Norwegian National Road Race Championships title for the second time, and entered his first Grand Tour – the Giro d'Italia, finishing third on stage eight.

=== Team Katusha (2012–2017) ===
==== 2012–2013 ====
For the 2012 season, Kristoff joined Team Katusha. His first victory with the team was stage 3a of the Three Days of De Panne, but lost the race lead during the final individual time trial stage; he ultimately won the race's points classification. He again competed in the Giro d'Italia, finishing second to Mark Cavendish on stage thirteen. Having finished third in the Norwegian National Road Race Championships in late June, Kristoff won a bronze medal in the road race at the London Olympics the following month, leading home the main field eight seconds down on race winner Alexander Vinokourov. Following the Olympics, Kristoff won a stage and the points classification at the Danmark Rundt, finished third overall and won the points classification at the World Ports Classic, and finished second behind solo winner Lars Bak at the Grand Prix de Fourmies.

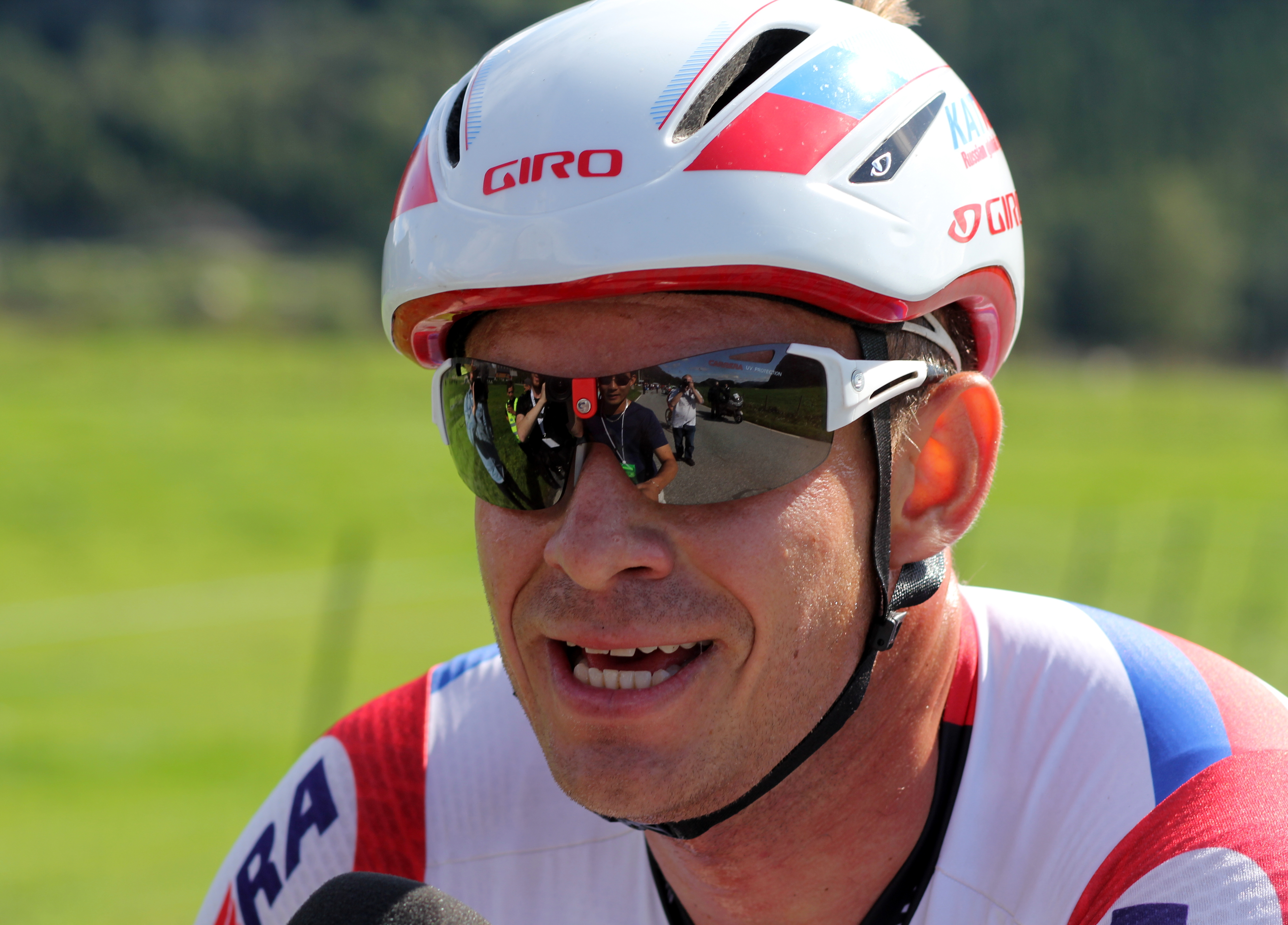
Kristoff following his stage 2 victory at the 2013 Tour des Fjords

The following year, Kristoff led home the chase group at March's Milan–San Remo, finishing in eighth place for his first top-ten cycling monument result. He again won stage 3a of the Three Days of De Panne, to take the race lead ahead of the final individual time trial stage where he fared better than in 2012, finishing sixth – but dropped behind Sylvain Chavanel in the general classification. He then placed fourth at the Tour of Flanders, again leading home a chasing group of riders, and also finished in the top ten places at Paris–Roubaix with ninth. He then won the opening two stages of Tour of Norway, before winning a third stage on the final day. At June's Tour de Suisse, Kristoff took his first victory at UCI World Tour level, winning the fifth stage into Leuggern from a bunch sprint. After losing out to Thor Hushovd in the Norwegian National Road Race Championships, Kristoff then competed in his first Tour de France, placing second on the opening stage. Following the Tour de France, Kristoff finished fourth overall at the Tour des Fjords, having won an individual stage, the team time trial – as part of Team Katusha – and the points classification. His final notable result of the year was a third-place finish at the Vattenfall Cyclassics in Germany, behind home riders John Degenkolb and André Greipel.

==== 2014 ====
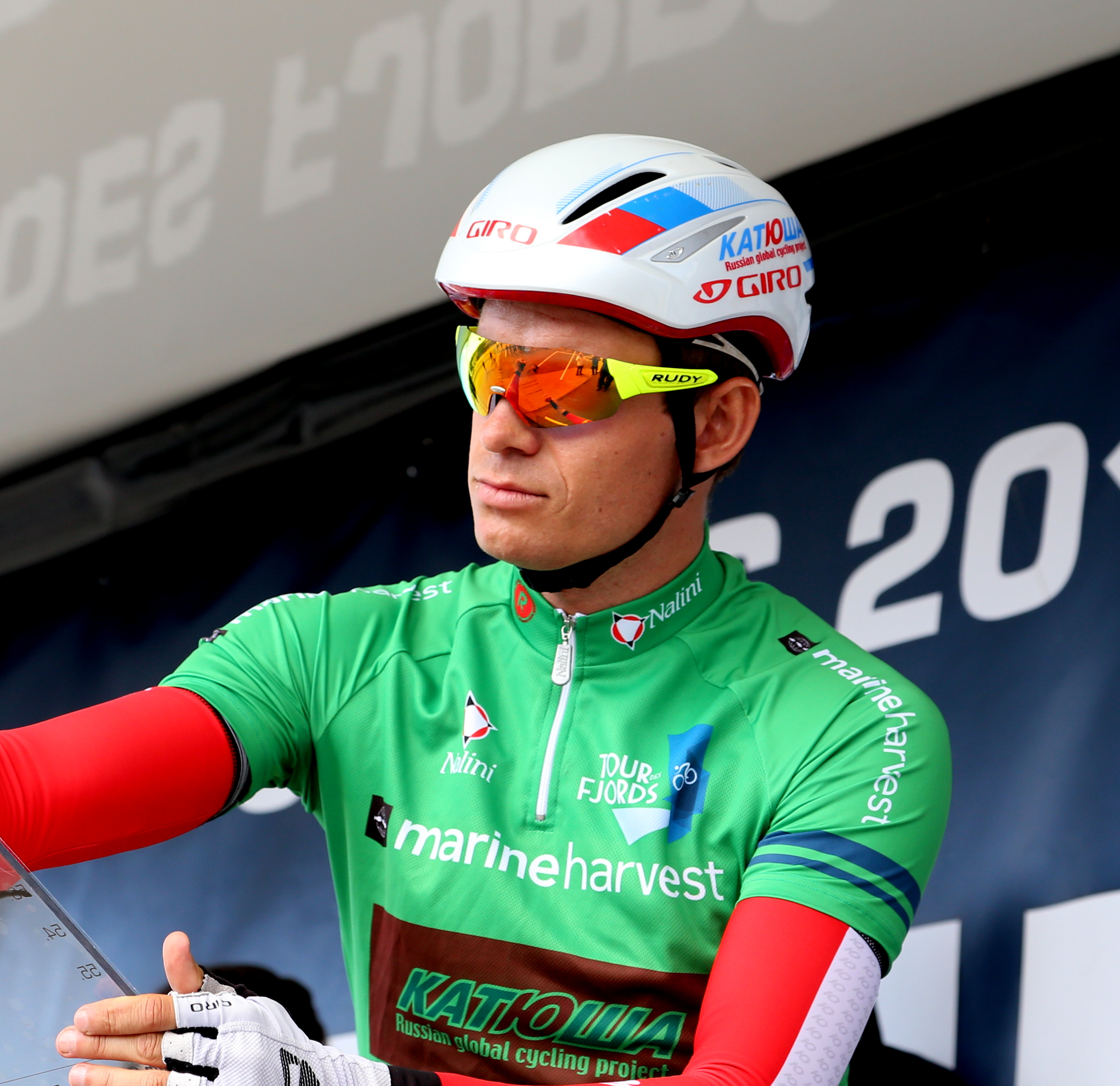
Kristoff at the 2014 Tour des Fjords

Kristoff took his first win of 2014 at February's Tour of Oman, winning the second stage of the race. The following month, he became the first Norwegian rider to win a cycling monument, when he won Milan–San Remo in a sprint finish of some 25 riders. He again finished in the top five at the Tour of Flanders, with a fifth-place result, before winning the Eschborn–Frankfurt – Rund um den Finanzplatz one-day race in a sprint finish in Frankfurt. The latter result started a prolific month of May for Kristoff, as he won two stages and the points classification at the Tour of Norway, and then went on to win three stages, the general classification and the points classification at the Tour des Fjords.

Having earlier finished second on stages four and six, Kristoff took his first Grand Tour stage win with victory on stage twelve of July's Tour de France, prevailing in Saint-Étienne ahead of Peter Sagan and Arnaud Démare. He took another stage win on stage 15, beating Heinrich Haussler and Sagan in Nîmes, as he ultimately finished as runner-up in the points classification, some 150 points in arrears of Sagan. He then followed this up with second overall at the Arctic Race of Norway, along with two stage wins and the points classification, and a bunch sprint victory at the Vattenfall Cyclassics in Hamburg. He competed in the road race at the UCI Road World Championships for the first time since 2010, culminating in an eighth-place finish. He finished the season with fourteen victories, and an eighth-place finish in the final standings of the UCI World Tour.

==== 2015 ====
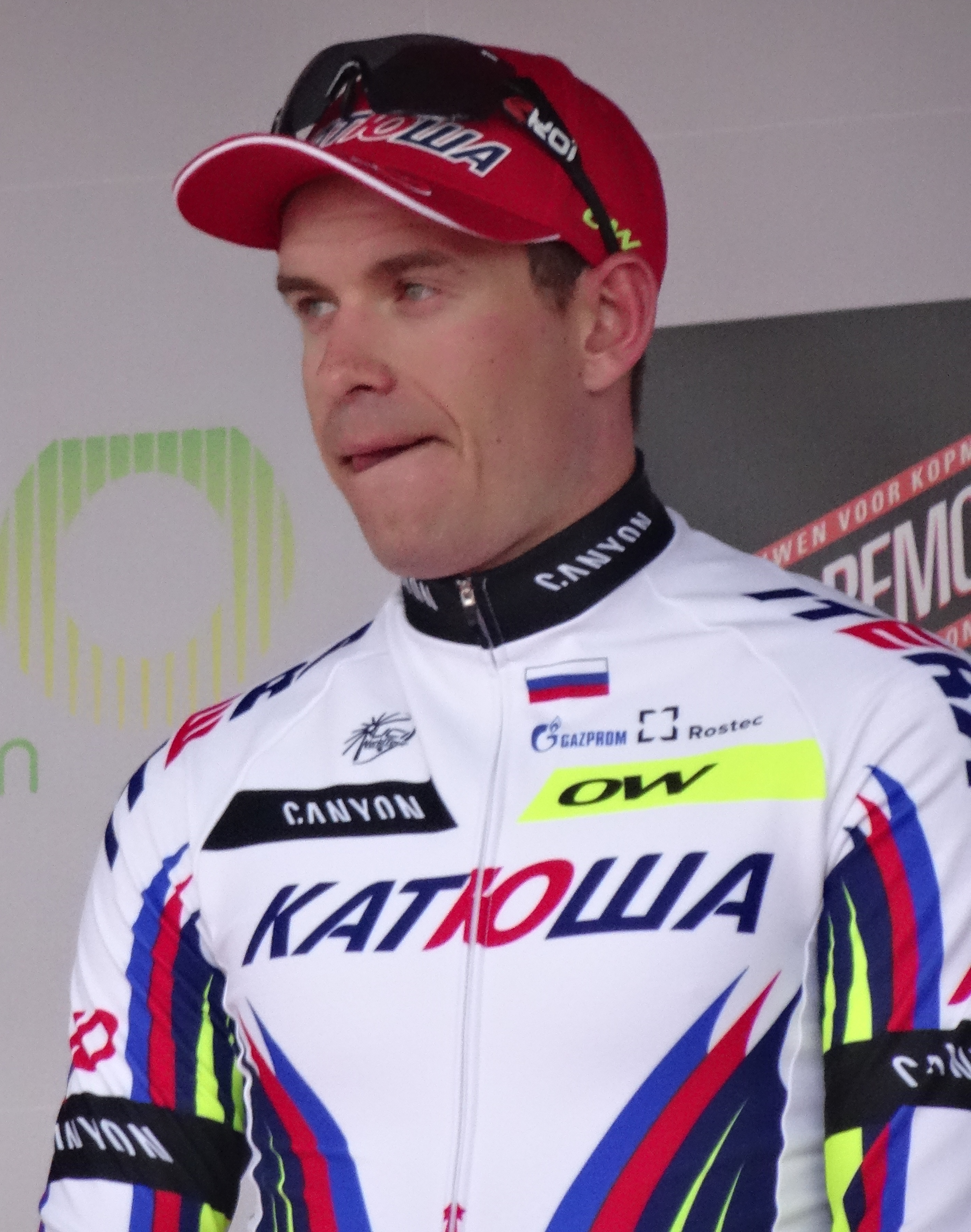
Kristoff, following his second-place finish at the 2015 Kuurne–Brussels–Kuurne

At his first start of the 2015 season, Kristoff won three stages at the Tour of Qatar, finishing third overall and he also won the points classification. He also won stages of the Tour of Oman and Paris–Nice, either side of a second-place finish to Mark Cavendish at Kuurne–Brussels–Kuurne. He attempted to retain his Milan–San Remo title, but was outsprinted for the victory by John Degenkolb, and ultimately finished second. He then placed fourth at E3 Harelbeke, and ninth at Gent–Wevelgem. At the Three Days of De Panne, he won the opening stage from a six-man breakaway, having been led out in the sprint by teammate Sven Erik Bystrøm. He won the following two stages in bunch sprints, the second of which by 5 millimetres (0.20 inches) ahead of André Greipel. Having held a 22-second lead going into the final individual time trial, Kristoff recorded the third-fastest time to win both the general and points classifications.

He then went on to win April's Tour of Flanders, his main goal for the spring classics, to become the first Norwegian rider to win the cobbled cycling monument. With some 30 kilometres (19 miles) remaining, Niki Terpstra attacked and only Kristoff went with him. The duo got a lead of 30 seconds with the remains of the lead group unable to catch them; Kristoff beat Terpstra in the sprint, to take his biggest win up to that point. Three days later Kristoff won the sprinters' semi-classic Scheldeprijs, becoming the first rider to win the Three Days of De Panne, the Tour of Flanders and the Scheldeprijs in the same season. With this form, Kristoff was seen as a favourite for Paris–Roubaix, but he ultimately finished the race in tenth place, prior to a pre-planned break from racing.

He returned to the peloton a month later at the Tour of Norway, winning the first two stages, the points classification and finishing eighth overall. He then won the first three stages at the Tour des Fjords, where he again won the points classification and finished in ninth place overall. He then took two further victories in Switzerland in June, winning both the Grand Prix of Aargau Canton and the seventh stage of the Tour de Suisse in bunch sprints. Before the end of the season, Kristoff took a further two victories – winning the opening stage of the Arctic Race of Norway and the GP Ouest-France one-day race – to take his tally to twenty wins, while also finishing second at the Vattenfall Cyclassics, third at the Grand Prix Cycliste de Québec, and fourth in the road race at the UCI Road World Championships in the United States.

==== 2016 ====
Kristoff started his 2016 season with a hat-trick of stage wins at the flat Tour of Qatar, finishing in second position overall to Mark Cavendish. He then took a further two stage victories at the Tour of Oman, before a second consecutive runner-up finish at Kuurne–Brussels–Kuurne, leading home the main field behind the solo winner Jasper Stuyven. He won the opening stage of the Three Days of De Panne from a three-rider lead group, maintaining the race lead until the final individual time trial stage, dropping to second overall behind Lieuwe Westra – but he did win the points classification. He was unable to defend his title at the Tour of Flanders, leading home a small group of riders in fourth position, before taking another win at the Eschborn–Frankfurt – Rund um den Finanzplatz one-day race, held at the start of May. Prior to the Tour de France, Kristoff took a stage victory at the Tour of California, and he finished second to Edvald Boasson Hagen at the Norwegian National Road Race Championships. He was unable to take any stage wins at the Tour de France, taking a best result of second place on two occasions, losing out to Cavendish on stage fourteen and Peter Sagan on stage sixteen. He won the opening stage of the Arctic Race of Norway for the second year in succession, before he led home the main field at the Bretagne Classic Ouest-France, finishing third behind Oliver Naesen and Alberto Bettiol. His final victories of the season came at the Tour des Fjords, where he won the general classification, three stages and the points classification.

==== 2017 ====
Kristoff won the points classification at his first two starts of the 2017 season, also winning a stage at the Étoile de Bessèges and three stages at the Tour of Oman. He added another points classification victory at the Three Days of De Panne, winning a stage as well as finishing third overall. He recorded top-five finishes at both Milan–San Remo (fourth) and the Tour of Flanders (fifth) either side of the Three Days of De Panne, before a third win at the Eschborn–Frankfurt – Rund um den Finanzplatz – equalling Erik Zabel's record – having been led out by Zabel's son Rick Zabel. Having missed out on another stage win at the Tour de France – finishing second to Arnaud Démare on stage four following Peter Sagan's disqualification – Kristoff took a victory in his first race following the Tour de France, winning the RideLondon–Surrey Classic in a bunch sprint.

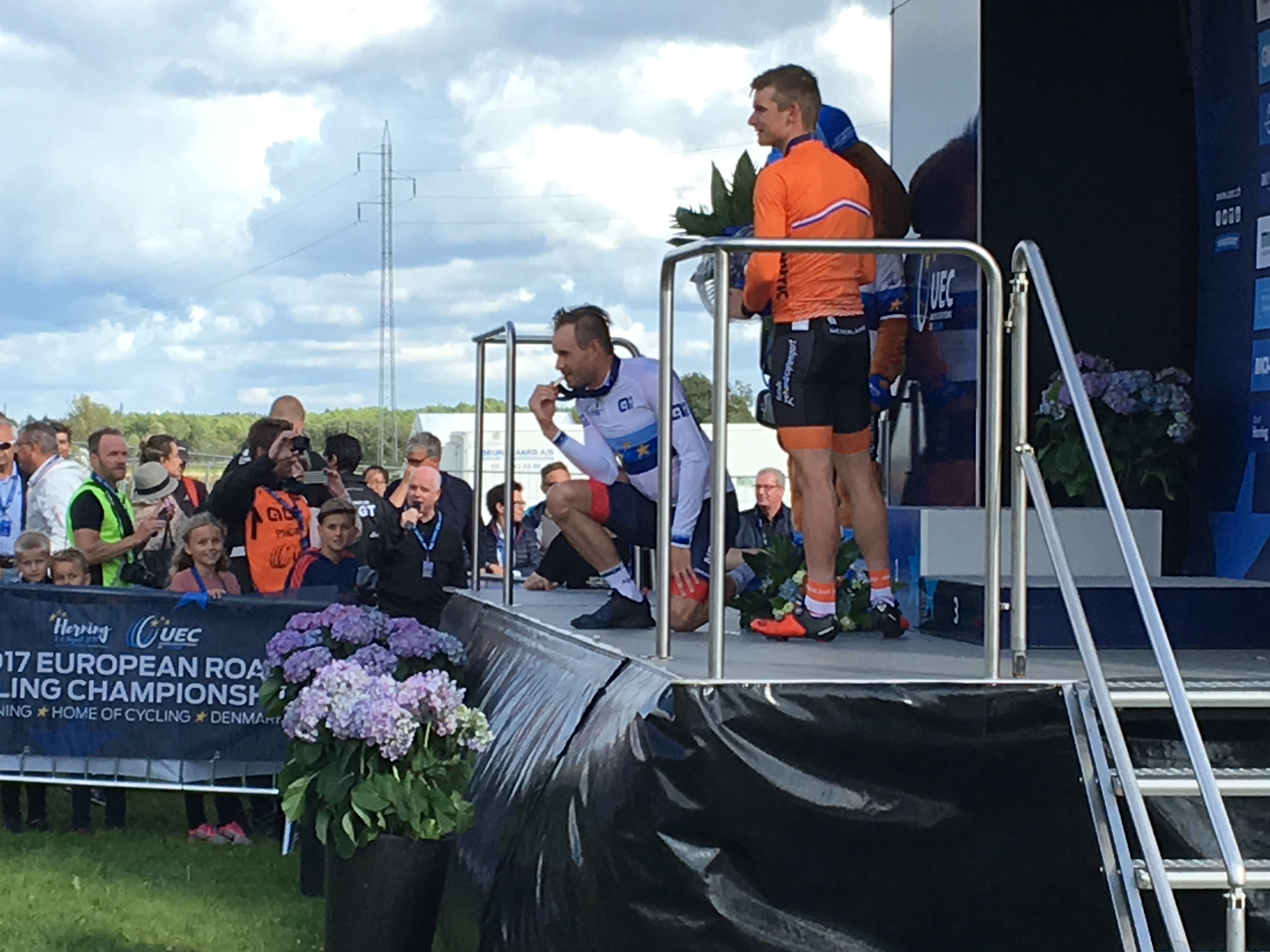
Kristoff (kneeling) celebrating his victory at the 2017 European Road Championships

The following weekend, Kristoff again won a bunch sprint for the men's road race title at the UEC European Road Championships in Denmark. He took his first victory in the European champion's jersey at the Arctic Race of Norway, when he won the second stage, which finished on the runway at Bardufoss Airport, in a bunch sprint. He missed out in bunch sprints at the EuroEyes Cyclassics (fourth) and the Bretagne Classic Ouest-France (second), before winning the points classification at the Tour of Britain, having finished each of the seven mass-start stages in either third, fourth or fifth place. Kristoff then won a silver medal in the road race at the UCI Road World Championships on home soil in Bergen, Norway. Only being out-sprinted by Sagan, who won a third consecutive world title, Kristoff took Norway's third medal in the event – after Thor Hushovd's victory in 2010 and Edvald Boasson Hagen's silver medal in 2012.

=== UAE Team Emirates (2018–2021) ===
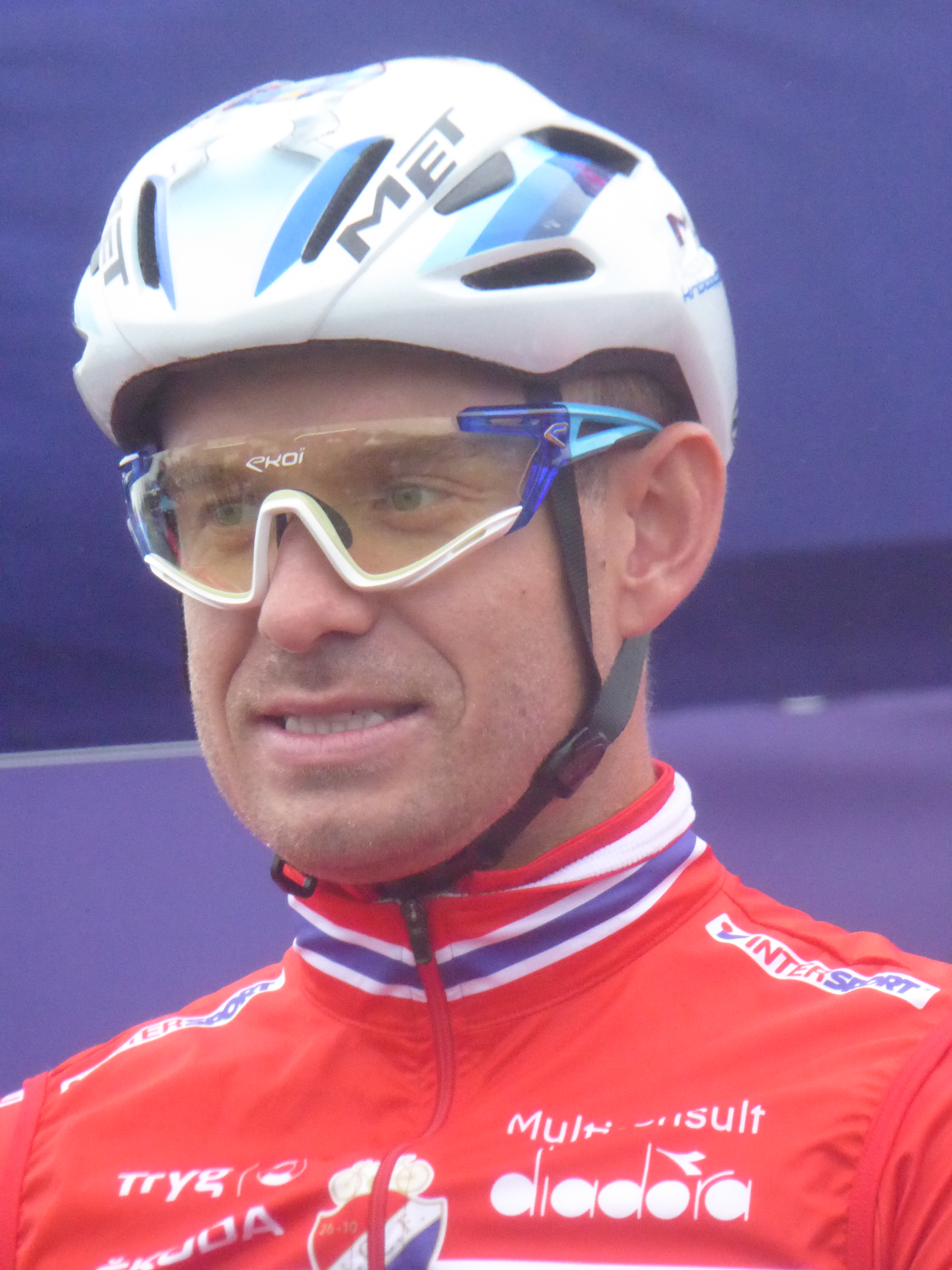
Kristoff at the 2018 European Road Cycling Championships

In August 2017, it was confirmed that Kristoff had signed an initial two-year deal with UAE Team Emirates starting from the 2018 season. He moved there with fellow Norwegian Sven Erik Bystrøm.

==== 2018 ====
Kristoff started his first season with his new team with a block of racing in the Middle East – riding at the Dubai Tour, the Tour of Oman and the Abu Dhabi Tour. He took consecutive victories, winning the final stage of the Tour of Oman, and the opening stage of the Abu Dhabi Tour. After another fourth-place finish at Milan–San Remo, Kristoff took a record fourth victory at Eschborn–Frankfurt, and a record-equalling second victory in the Grand Prix of Aargau Canton. His only other victory during the season came at the Tour de France on the final Champs-Élysées stage, the first Norwegian victory there since Thor Hushovd in 2006, as he finished in second place in the points classification to Peter Sagan, just as he did in 2014.

==== 2019 ====
Having started his 2019 season in Spain, Kristoff's first victory of the season came with a win on the opening stage of February's Tour of Oman, a record-extending ninth stage win at the race. He then won Gent–Wevelgem in a group sprint of some thirty riders, before leading home a group of riders at the Tour of Flanders in third position, taking his first podium in a cycling monument since his 2015 Tour of Flanders victory. Kristoff was beaten for the first time at Eschborn–Frankfurt since his début in 2012, as he finished third behind home riders Pascal Ackermann and John Degenkolb. Kristoff then won each of his next two starts; he won the Tour of Norway, having taken the overall lead on the penultimate day with a stage win into Drammen, before he took a record third victory in the Grand Prix of Aargau Canton.

Following these successes, Kristoff extended his UAE Team Emirates contract by a further two years, which would see him remain with the team until the end of the 2021 season. At the Tour de France, Kristoff's best stage result was a second-place finish to Elia Viviani on stage four, and in a January 2020 interview with Cyclingnews.com, he felt that he may have competed in his last Tour de France at that time. Over the remainder of the season, Kristoff took two further victories – winning the second stage of the Deutschland Tour, and the opening stage of the Okolo Slovenska – and recorded top-ten finishes in the road race at both the UEC European Road Championships (fourth) and the UCI Road World Championships (seventh), leading home the bunch sprint at both.

==== 2020–2021 ====
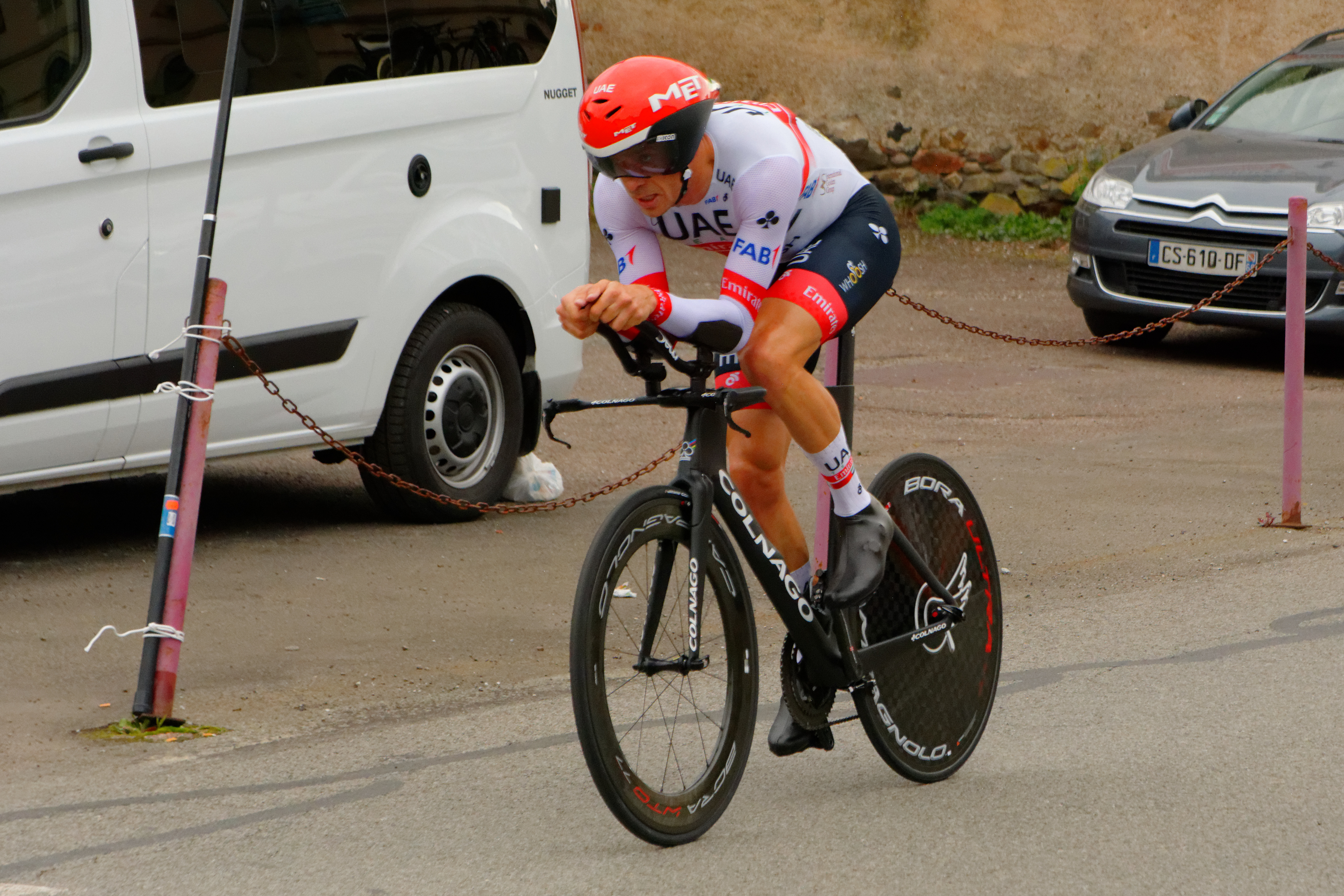
Kristoff at the 2020 Tour de France

Prior to the COVID-19 pandemic-enforced suspension of racing in 2020, Kristoff had taken a second-place finish at the Clásica de Almería, and a third-place finish at Kuurne–Brussels–Kuurne. Following the resumption of racing, Kristoff ended up riding the Tour de France in August, following the postponement of the Giro d'Italia to October. At the Tour de France, Kristoff avoided all the crashes on the opening stage and won the final sprint in Nice, to take the yellow jersey, becoming the second Norwegian to do so after Thor Hushovd. He ultimately ceded the jersey to Julian Alaphilippe following the next stage, having lost nearly half an hour on a hilly parcours around Nice. His only other podium finish during the season came at the Tour of Flanders, when he led a chasing group across the line in third place, eight seconds in arrears of Mathieu van der Poel and Wout van Aert.

In 2021, Kristoff did not record any top-five results in the first third of the season, with his first such result coming at the one-day races held as part of the Vuelta a Mallorca – finishing fifth in the Trofeo Serra de Tramuntana and second in the Trofeo Alcúdia–Port d'Alcúdia. He won the points classification at the Arctic Race of Norway, having finished each of the first two stages in second place. His only individual victories of the season came at August's Deutschland Tour, winning the second and fourth stages as he finished the race in third place overall, before recording a further third-place finish in the Eschborn–Frankfurt held the following month. He did not ride any of the Grand Tours for the first time since 2010, his first season as a professional.

=== Intermarché–Wanty–Gobert Matériaux (2022) ===
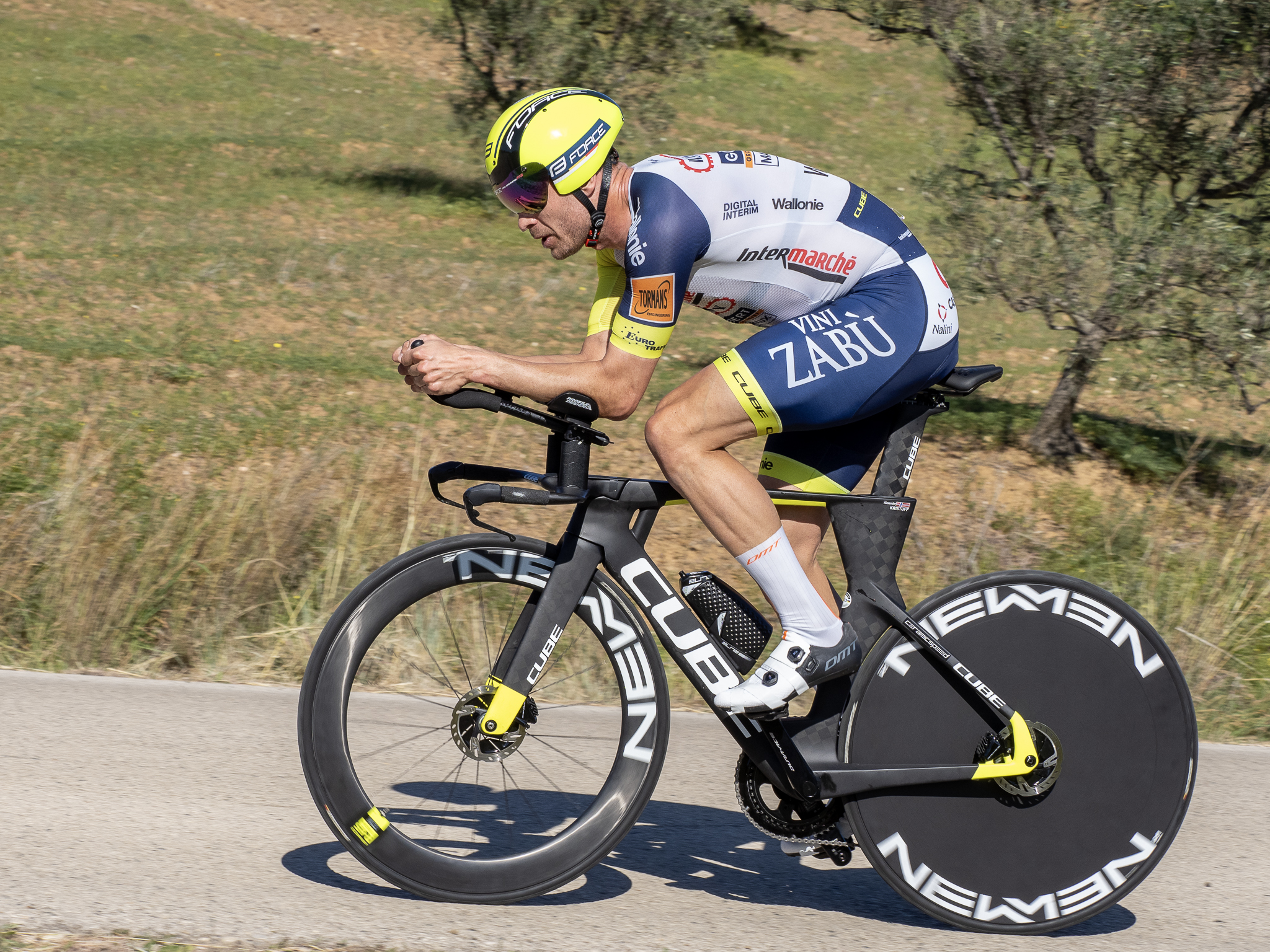
Kristoff at the 2022 Volta ao Algarve

In August 2021, Kristoff signed a one-year contract with Intermarché–Wanty–Gobert Matériaux for the 2022 season, where he was joined by his compatriot Sven Erik Bystrøm. Making his début with a block of racing in Spain, Kristoff took his first victory with the team, and in Spain as a whole, at the Clásica de Almería, winning in a bunch sprint. He then finished third in Milano–Torino, tenth at the Tour of Flanders, before a second win of the season at the Scheldeprijs – taking a solo victory, having attacked within the last 7 kilometres (4.3 miles) of the race. Kristoff recorded further podium finishes at Eschborn–Frankfurt (third), and the Grand Prix du Morbihan (second), before a stage victory at the Tour of Norway, winning the final stage in his home city of Stavanger.

Kristoff finished second to Rasmus Tiller in the Norwegian National Road Race Championships, before a third-place finish at the Tour of Leuven, leading a small group home behind Victor Campenaerts and Zdeněk Štybar. Three days after the latter, Kristoff was able to get the better of Campenaerts and Dries Van Gestel when he won sprint into La Louvière at the finish of Circuit Franco-Belge. He was the top Norwegian finisher in the road race at the UEC European Road Championships in mid-August, finishing in eighth place, before he won the second stage of the Deutschland Tour at the end of the month. He finished the season with a sixth-place finish in the road race at the UCI Road World Championships in Australia, with he and Tiller finishing as part of the lead group behind solo winner Remco Evenepoel.

=== Uno-X Pro Cycling Team (2023–present) ===
Kristoff did not extend his contract with Intermarché–Wanty–Gobert Matériaux into 2023, instead signing a three-year contract with UCI ProTeam Uno-X Pro Cycling Team from the 2023 season onwards. Kristoff started the season in Iberia, finishing fourth in the Clásica de Almería, before taking his first victory with the team, winning a bunch sprint on the opening stage of the Volta ao Algarve in Lagos. His next victory came three months later, when he won in Stavanger for the second year in succession on the final stage of the Tour of Norway. Either side of the Tour de France, Kristoff finished second in the Norwegian National Road Race Championships behind teammate and solo winner Fredrik Dversnes, and then second in the Egmont Cycling Race, having been out-sprinted by Jasper De Buyst. Kristoff finished the season with a second-place overall finish at the CRO Race, where he also won the points classification.

Kristoff started the 2024 season with a second-place finish to Gerben Thijssen in the Trofeo Palma in January, held as part of the Vuelta a Mallorca one-day races. Kristoff's first win of the year did not come until May, when he won the Elfstedenronde from a small group. He won his next start as well, coming at the Antwerp Port Epic, before a third-consecutive final stage victory in Stavanger at the Tour of Norway. A third Belgian one-day victory of 2024 came for Kristoff at the Heistse Pijl at the start of June, before he won the first two stages of the Arctic Race of Norway in August. He recorded a fifth-place finish in the road race at the UEC European Road Championships in Belgium, before concluding his season with two stage victories at the CRO Race.

== Personal life ==
Kristoff married Maren Kommedal at Stavanger Cathedral in October 2014, and the couple have four children. His younger half-brother Felix Ørn-Kristoff (born 2006) is also a cyclist, who has won a bronze medal in the junior road race at the 2023 UCI Road World Championships and a gold medal in the same event at the 2024 European Road Championships.

== Major results ==
2005
2nd Time trial, National Junior Road Championships
10th Road race, UCI Junior World Championships
2006
Grenland GP

1st Stages 1 & 2

2007 (1 pro win)
1st Road race, National Road Championships
5th Poreč Trophy
6th Colliers Classic
2008
1st Criterium, National Road Championships
1st Stage 4 Ringerike GP
2nd Rogaland Grand Prix
2nd Poreč Trophy
2009
1st Road race, National Under-23 Road Championships
1st Stage 3 Ringerike GP
2nd Road race, National Road Championships
2nd Sandefjord Grand Prix
5th Overall Tour de Bretagne
5th La Côte Picarde
7th Road race, UEC European Under-23 Road Championships
7th Druivenkoers Overijse
9th Poreč Trophy
9th ZLM Tour
10th Ronde Van Vlaanderen Beloften
2010
3rd Philadelphia International Championship
4th Vattenfall Cyclassics
5th Grand Prix de Fourmies
7th Kampioenschap van Vlaanderen
8th Grote Prijs Jef Scherens
9th Paris–Bruxelles
10th Scheldeprijs
10th Memorial Rik Van Steenbergen
2011 (1)
1st Road race, National Road Championships
2nd Grand Prix de Fourmies
5th Grand Prix d'Isbergues
7th Scheldeprijs
7th Paris–Bruxelles
7th London–Surrey Cycle Classic
7th Kampioenschap van Vlaanderen
2012 (2)
Three Days of De Panne

1st Points classification
1st Stage 3a

2nd Grand Prix de Fourmies
3rd Road race, Olympic Games
3rd Road race, National Road Championships
3rd Overall World Ports Classic

1st Young rider classification

4th Overall Danmark Rundt

1st Points classification
1st Stage 4

6th Eschborn–Frankfurt – Rund um den Finanzplatz
9th Kuurne–Brussels–Kuurne
2013 (6)
Tour of Norway

1st Stages 1, 2 & 5

1st Stage 5 Tour de Suisse
2nd Road race, National Road Championships
2nd Overall Three Days of De Panne

1st Points classification
1st Stage 3a

3rd Vattenfall Cyclassics
4th Overall Tour des Fjords

1st Points classification
1st Stages 2 & 3 (TTT)

4th Tour of Flanders
4th Brussels Cycling Classic
5th Scheldeprijs
8th Milan–San Remo
9th Paris–Roubaix
2014 (14)
1st Overall Tour des Fjords

1st Points classification
1st Stages 2, 4 & 5

1st Milan–San Remo
1st Eschborn–Frankfurt – Rund um den Finanzplatz
1st Vattenfall Cyclassics
Tour of Norway

1st Points classification
1st Stages 1 & 5

Tour de France

1st Stages 12 & 15

1st Stage 2 Tour of Oman
2nd Overall Arctic Race of Norway

1st Points classification
1st Stages 2 & 4

5th Tour of Flanders
8th Road race, UCI Road World Championships
8th UCI World Tour
8th Overall Three Days of De Panne
8th GP Ouest-France
2015 (20)
1st Overall Three Days of De Panne

1st Points classification
1st Stages 1, 2 & 3a

1st Tour of Flanders
1st GP Ouest-France
1st Scheldeprijs
1st Grand Prix of Aargau Canton
Arctic Race of Norway

1st Points classification
1st Stage 1

1st Stage 1 Paris–Nice
1st Stage 7 Tour de Suisse
1st Stage 3 Tour of Oman
2nd Milan–San Remo
2nd Vattenfall Cyclassics
2nd Kuurne–Brussels–Kuurne
3rd Overall Tour of Qatar

1st Points classification
1st Stages 2, 4 & 5

3rd Grand Prix Cycliste de Québec
4th UCI World Tour
4th Road race, UCI Road World Championships
4th E3 Harelbeke
8th Overall Tour of Norway

1st Points classification
1st Stages 1 & 2

9th Overall Tour des Fjords

1st Points classification
1st Stages 1, 2 & 3

9th Gent–Wevelgem
10th Paris–Roubaix
2016 (13)
1st Overall Tour des Fjords

1st Points classification
1st Stages 2, 3 & 5

1st Eschborn–Frankfurt – Rund um den Finanzplatz
Tour of Oman

1st Stages 3 & 6

1st Stage 1 Arctic Race of Norway
1st Stage 7 Tour of California
2nd Road race, National Road Championships
2nd Overall Tour of Qatar

1st Points classification
1st Stages 2, 4 & 5

2nd Overall Three Days of De Panne

1st Points classification
1st Stage 1

2nd Kuurne–Brussels–Kuurne
3rd Bretagne Classic
4th Tour of Flanders
5th EuroEyes Cyclassics
6th Milan–San Remo
7th Road race, UCI Road World Championships
2017 (9)
1st Road race, UEC European Road Championships
1st Eschborn–Frankfurt – Rund um den Finanzplatz
1st London–Surrey Classic
Tour of Oman

1st Points classification
1st Stages 1, 4 & 6

Étoile de Bessèges

1st Points classification
1st Stage 2

1st Points classification, Tour of Britain
2nd Road race, UCI Road World Championships
2nd Bretagne Classic
3rd Overall Three Days of De Panne

1st Points classification
1st Stage 2

4th Overall Arctic Race of Norway

1st Stage 2

4th Milan–San Remo
4th EuroEyes Cyclassics
5th Tour of Flanders
7th Münsterland Giro
2018 (5)
1st Eschborn–Frankfurt
1st Grand Prix of Aargau Canton
1st Stage 21 Tour de France
1st Stage 1 Abu Dhabi Tour
1st Stage 6 Tour of Oman
3rd EuroEyes Cyclassics
4th Milan–San Remo
6th Grand Prix de Fourmies
9th Overall Dubai Tour
2019 (7)
1st Overall Tour of Norway

1st Points classification
1st Stage 5

1st Gent–Wevelgem
1st Grand Prix of Aargau Canton
1st Stage 1 Tour of Oman
1st Stage 1a Okolo Slovenska
1st Stage 2 Deutschland Tour
3rd Tour of Flanders
3rd Eschborn–Frankfurt
4th Road race, UEC European Road Championships
4th EuroEyes Cyclassics
7th Road race, UCI Road World Championships
7th London–Surrey Classic
7th Brussels Cycling Classic
2020 (1)
Tour de France

1st Stage 1
Held after Stage 1
Held after Stages 1 & 2

2nd Clásica de Almería
3rd Tour of Flanders
3rd Kuurne–Brussels–Kuurne
2021 (2)
1st Points classification, Arctic Race of Norway
2nd Trofeo Alcúdia–Port d'Alcúdia
3rd Overall Deutschland Tour

1st Stages 2 & 4

3rd Eschborn–Frankfurt
5th Trofeo Serra de Tramuntana
6th Dwars door Vlaanderen
2022 (5)
1st Scheldeprijs
1st Clásica de Almería
1st Circuit Franco-Belge
1st Stage 2 Deutschland Tour
1st Stage 6 Tour of Norway
2nd Road race, National Road Championships
2nd Grand Prix du Morbihan
3rd Milano–Torino
3rd Eschborn–Frankfurt
3rd Tour of Leuven
4th Paris–Bourges
6th Road race, UCI Road World Championships
7th Gooikse Pijl
8th Road race, UEC European Road Championships
9th Brussels Cycling Classic
10th Tour of Flanders
10th Hamburg Cyclassics
2023 (2)
1st Stage 1 Volta ao Algarve
1st Stage 3 Tour of Norway
2nd Road race, National Road Championships
2nd Overall CRO Race

1st Points classification

2nd Egmont Cycling Race
4th Omloop Het Nieuwsblad
4th Clásica de Almería
4th Grand Prix de Fourmies
7th Super 8 Classic
7th Gooikse Pijl
2024 (8)
1st Antwerp Port Epic
1st Elfstedenronde
1st Heistse Pijl
Arctic Race of Norway

1st Stages 1 & 2

CRO Race

1st Stages 1 & 5

1st Stage 4 Tour of Norway
2nd Trofeo Palma
4th Ronde van Limburg
5th Road race, UEC European Road Championships
5th Hamburg Cyclassics
10th Trofeo Ses Salines-Felanitx
2025 (2)
1st Stage 2 Arctic Race of Norway
1st Stage 3 Vuelta a Andalucía
4th Gent–Wevelgem
8th Scheldeprijs

=== Classics results timeline ===
Monument	2010	2011	2012	2013	2014	2015	2016	2017	2018	2019	2020	2021	2022	2023	2024	2025
Milan–San Remo	—	—	131	8	1	2	6	4	4	14	83	89	26	—	85	—
Tour of Flanders	—	—	15	4	5	1	4	5	16	3	3	18	10	18	74	55
Paris–Roubaix	DNF	DNF	57	9	DNF	10	48	DNF	57	56	NH	14	12	15	21	DNF
Liège–Bastogne–Liège	Did not contest during his career															
Giro di Lombardia	Did not contest during his career															
Classic	2010	2011	2012	2013	2014	2015	2016	2017	2018	2019	2020	2021	2022	2023	2024	2025
Omloop Het Nieuwsblad	—	—	101	138	77	11	101	DNF	—	—	DNF	58	60	4	14	—
Kuurne–Brussels–Kuurne	DNF	—	9	NH	11	2	2	21	—	—	3	40	11	43	118	—
Milano–Torino	Not held		—	—	—	—	—	—	—	—	68	—	3	—	16	—
Dwars door Vlaanderen	—	112	—	20	13	—	—	—	76	12	NH	6	31	27	77	DNF
E3 Harelbeke	—	—	94	—	—	4	53	27	40	21	NH	66	—	DNF	—	—
Gent–Wevelgem	DNF	—	—	14	11	9	DNS	73	25	1	19	28	11	69	DNS	4
Scheldeprijs	10	7	17	5	15	1	15	—	—	—	13	33	1	88	—	8
Eschborn–Frankfurt	—	—	6	—	1	NH	1	1	1	3	NH	3	3	12	45	—
Hamburg Cyclassics	4	14	11	3	1	2	5	4	3	4	NH	NH	10	—	5	49
Bretagne Classic	—	—	—	DNF	8	1	3	2	11	—	—	—	—	—	—	—

=== Major championships results timeline ===
	2006	2007	2008	2009	2010	2011	2012	2013	2014	2015	2016	2017	2018	2019	2020	2021	2022	2023	2024	2025
Olympic Games	Not held		—	Not held			3	Not held			—	Not held				—	Not held		—	NH
World Championships	—	—	—	—	69	—	—	—	8	4	7	2	—	7	—	21	6	DNF	—	—
European Championships	Race did not exist										—	1	11	4	DNF	DNF	8	—	5	—
National Championships	21	1	5	2	—	1	3	2	16	10	2	50	27	7	6	DNF	2	2	DNS	27

=== Grand Tour general classification results timeline ===
	2011	2012	2013	2014	2015	2016	2017	2018	2019	2020	2021	2022	2023	2024
Giro d'Italia	157	149	—	—	—	—	—	—	—	—	—	—	—	—
Stages won	0	0	—	—	—	—	—	—	—	—	—	—	—	—
Points classification	30	8	—	—	—	—	—	—	—	—	—	—	—	—
Tour de France	—	—	147	125	130	149	130	114	139	132	—	102	134	131
Stages won	—	—	0	2	0	0	0	1	0	1	—	0	0	0
Points classification	—	—	5	2	10	5	4	2	18	11	—	24	28	19
Vuelta a España	Did not contest during his career													
Stages won	Did not contest during his career													
Points classification	Did not contest during his career													

Legend
1	Winner
2–3	Top three-finish
4–10	Top ten-finish
11–	Other finish
DNE	Did not enter
DNF-x	Did not finish (retired on stage x)
DNS-x	Did not start (not started on stage x)
HD-x	Finished outside time limit (occurred on stage x)
DSQ	Disqualified
N/A	Race/classification not held
NR	Not ranked in this classification
