= 2016 RideLondon–Surrey Classic =

2016 UCI Europe Tour

Race details
- Dates: 31 July 2016
- Stages: 1
- Winning time: 4h 43' 56"

Results
	Winner	Tom Boonen (BEL)	(Etixx–Quick-Step)
	Second	Mark Renshaw (AUS)	(Team Dimension Data)
	Third	Michael Matthews (AUS)	(Orica–BikeExchange)

The 2016 RideLondon–Surrey Classic was the 5th edition of the London–Surrey Classic road bicycle race. The race took place on 31 July 2016. It was won by Belgian rider Tom Boonen.

== Results ==
	Cyclist	Team	Time
1	Tom Boonen (BEL)	Etixx–Quick-Step	4h 43' 56"
2	Mark Renshaw (AUS)	Team Dimension Data	s.t.
3	Michael Matthews (AUS)	Orica–BikeExchange	s.t.
4	Jens Debusschere (BEL)	Lotto–Soudal	s.t.
5	Jarosław Marycz (POL)	CCC–Sprandi–Polkowice	s.t.
6	Paolo Simion (ITA)	Bardiani–CSF	s.t.
7	Floris Gerts (NED)	BMC Racing Team	s.t.
8	Tobyn Horton (GBR)	Madison Genesis	s.t.
9	Steele Von Hoff (AUS)	ONE Pro Cycling	s.t.
10	Mark McNally (GBR)	Wanty–Groupe Gobert	s.t.
