= 2013 RideLondon–Surrey Classic =

2013 UCI Europe Tour
- Elevation Profile

Race details
- Dates: 4 August 2013
- Stages: 1
- Distance: 221 km (137.3 mi)
- Winning time: 5h 07' 44"

Results
	Winner	Arnaud Démare (FRA)	(FDJ.fr)
	Second	Sacha Modolo (ITA)	(Bardiani Valvole–CSF Inox)
	Third	Yannick Martinez (FRA)	(La Pomme Marseille)
	Mountains	Ramon Sinkeldam (NED)	(Argos–Shimano)
	Sprints	Ramon Sinkeldam (NED)	(Argos–Shimano)

The 2013 RideLondon–Surrey Classic (also known as the 2013 Prudential RideLondon–Surrey Classic for sponsorship reasons) was the inaugural running of the RideLondon–Surrey Classic one-day cycling race. It was held on 4 August 2013 as a 1.1 category event within the 2013 UCI Europe Tour.

The race was won by FDJ.fr rider Arnaud Démare in a sprint finish from a large main group of 96 riders. Sacha Modolo of Bardiani Valvole–CSF Inox finished second, having also finished second on The Mall in the 2011 London-Surrey Cycle Classic. The podium was completed by Yannick Martinez of La Pomme Marseille.

Pre-race favourite Peter Sagan (Cannondale) failed to finish together with Matthew Goss (Orica–GreenEDGE). The highest place Briton was Ben Swift (Team Sky) who having been edged out in the final sprint, rolled in tenth, ahead of Gerald Ciolek (MTN–Qhubeka) - winner of the 2013 Milan – San Remo.

== Route ==
The detailed profile of the Leith Hill Loop as featured in the 2013 Prudential RideLondon–Surrey Classic

The detailed profiles of the King of the Mountains classification climbs as featured in the 2013 Prudential RideLondon–Surrey Classic

The 221 km (137.3 mi) route chosen for the 2013 edition of the RideLondon–Surrey Classic was a variation of the course used for the 2012 Summer Olympics. The route featured five categorised climbs and three intermediate sprint points.

Riders started from the Queen Elizabeth Olympic Park close to the Olympic Velodrome before passing close to Canary Wharf and the Tower of London on the way through central London. Leaving London by the A4 the route passed through Richmond Park, Kingston upon Thames and Hampton Court Palace.

In Surrey the route passed through Weybridge and Ripley on the way to the first categorised climb of Newlands Corner near Guildford before heading along the A25 to Abinger Hammer. The route then featured three 27.3 km (17.0 mi) laps of a hilly section routed through Holmbury St Mary, Forest Green and Ockley which included the climb of Leith Hill - the highest point in South-East England.

The route back to London travelled through Dorking and included a single ascent of Box Hill before the largely flat run-in via Cobham, Kingston upon Thames, Wimbledon and Putney. The final kilometres followed the Embankment, past the Palace of Westminster, along Whitehall and turned right through Admiralty Arch 400m from the finish on The Mall.

=== Sprints classification ===
There were three Intermediate Sprints that counted towards the sprints classification:

Sprint	Race distance
Hampton Court Palace	35.2 km (21.9 mi)
Dorking High Street	160.3 km (99.6 mi)
Cobham High Street	185.7 km (115.4 mi)

Note that points were not awarded at the finish line.

=== King of the Mountains classification ===
There were five categorised climbs that counted towards the King of the Mountains classification:

Climb	Race distance	Category	Length	Ascent	Average grade	Max. grade
Newlands Corner	69.2 km (43.0 mi)	Cat 3	1.8 km (1.1 mi)	84 m (276 ft)	4.7%	9.6%
Leith Hill (1st Passage)	95.3 km (59.2 mi)	Cat 2	2.1 km (1.3 mi)	139 m (456 ft)	6.6%	11.8%
Leith Hill (2nd Passage)	122.6 km (76.2 mi)	Cat 2	2.1 km (1.3 mi)	139 m (456 ft)	6.6%	11.8%
Leith Hill (3rd Passage)	149.9 km (93.1 mi)	Cat 2	2.1 km (1.3 mi)	139 m (456 ft)	6.6%	11.8%
Box Hill	165.9 km (103.1 mi)	Cat 2	2.5 km (1.6 mi)	123 m (404 ft)	4.9%	10.9%

== Teams ==
25 teams were invited to the 2013 RideLondon–Surrey Classic: 8 UCI ProTeams, 6 UCI Pro Continental Teams, 10 UCI Continental Teams along with the British national team.

Each of the 25 teams were due to enter six riders to the race, making up a starting peloton of 150 riders. Belkin Pro Cycling and MTN–Qhubeka both entered teams of five riders, and Vegard Breen of Joker–Merida did not start, making a starting field of 147 riders.

The 25 teams that competed in the race were:

UCI ProTeams
- Belkin Pro Cycling
- Cannondale
- FDJ.fr
- Garmin–Sharp
- Orica–GreenEDGE
- Team Sky
- Argos–Shimano
- Vacansoleil–DCM
UCI Pro Continental Teams
- Bardiani Valvole–CSF Inox
- Champion System
- MTN–Qhubeka
- Sojasun
- NetApp–Endura
- Topsport Vlaanderen–Baloise
UCI Continental Teams
- An Post–Chain Reaction
- Joker–Merida
- La Pomme Marseille
- Madison Genesis
- Node 4–Giordana Racing
- Rapha Condor–JLT
- Synergy Baku
- Team IG–Sigma Sport
- Team Raleigh
- Team UK Youth
National Teams
- Great Britain Cycling Team

== Race report ==
A breakaway of eight riders formed after 44 km, although their advantage did not increase beyond five minutes. The breakaway contained Ramon Sinkeldam of Argos–Shimano who would subsequently amass enough points at the intermediate sprints and on the categorised climbs to win both the Sprints Classification and the King of the Mountains Classification.

With Team Sky, Orica–GreenEDGE and Vacansoleil–DCM controlling the peloton the gap to the breakaway reduced to a little over two minutes after the three laps of the Leith Hill circuit. The peloton briefly splintered on the last categorised climb of Box Hill as David Millar of Garmin–Sharp set a furious pace which led to the escape of his teammate Jack Bauer together with Yoann Offredo (FDJ.fr) and Simon Yates (Great Britain Cycling Team) - who eventually caught the early breakaway.

With the peloton approaching Yoann Offredo and Zico Waeytens (Topsport Vlaanderen–Baloise) attacked the remnants of the breakaway on the approach to Kingston upon Thames and built a lead of over a minute with 20 km left to race, however on the approach to London (within the final 6 km) they too were caught by the peloton — resulting in the widely expected bunch sprint on The Mall.

David Millar led the peloton through Westminster, but as the teams passed under the flamme rouge with 1 km to go it was FDJ.fr who were the better organised, delivering Arnaud Démare to the line to win by a bike length from Sacha Modolo.

== Results ==
=== General classification ===
Of the 147 starters 131 completed the course within the time limit and 96 riders finished on the same time. The top 10 finishers were:

	Cyclist	Team	Time
1	Arnaud Démare (FRA)	FDJ.fr	5h 07' 44"
2	Sacha Modolo (ITA)	Bardiani Valvole–CSF Inox	s.t.
3	Yannick Martinez (FRA)	La Pomme Marseille	s.t.
4	Fabio Sabatini (ITA)	Cannondale	s.t.
5	Danny van Poppel (NED)	Vacansoleil–DCM	s.t.
6	Zak Dempster (AUS)	NetApp–Endura	s.t.
7	Raymond Kreder (NED)	Garmin–Sharp	s.t.
8	Cristian Delle Stelle (ITA)	Bardiani Valvole–CSF Inox	s.t.
9	Chris Sutton (AUS)	Team Sky	s.t.
10	Ben Swift (GBR)	Team Sky	s.t.

=== Sprints classification ===
The results of the Sprints Classification were:

	Cyclist	Team	Points
1	Ramon Sinkeldam (NED)	Argos–Shimano	10
2	Dominique Rollin (CAN)	FDJ.fr	6
3	Jonathan Mould (GBR)	Team UK Youth	5
4	Adam Yates (GBR)	Great Britain Cycling Team	3
5=	Zico Waeytens (BEL)	Topsport Vlaanderen–Baloise	2
5=	Roman Van Uden (NZL)	Node 4–Giordana Racing	2
5=	Jack Bauer (NZL)	Garmin–Sharp	2
8=	Matt Brammeier (IRL)	Champion System	1
8=	Clinton Avery (NZL)	Champion System	1
8=	Reidar Bohlin Borgersen (NOR)	Joker–Merida	1

=== King of the Mountains classification ===
The results of the King of the Mountains Classification were:

	Cyclist	Team	Points
1	Ramon Sinkeldam (NED)	Argos–Shimano	26
2	Dominique Rollin (CAN)	FDJ.fr	23
3	Zico Waeytens (BEL)	Topsport Vlaanderen–Baloise	20
4	Jonathon McEvoy (GBR)	NetApp–Endura	12
5	Michael Cuming (GBR)	Rapha Condor–Sharp	7
6	Reidar Bohlin Borgersen (NOR)	Joker–Merida	5
7	Clinton Avery (NZL)	Champion System	1
