= 2019 RideLondon–Surrey Classic =

2019 UCI World Tour, race 30 of 38

Race details
- Dates: 4 August 2019
- Stages: 1
- Distance: 170 km (105.6 mi)
- Winning time: 3h 46' 16"

Results
	Winner	Elia Viviani (ITA)	(Deceuninck–Quick-Step)
	Second	Sam Bennett (IRL)	(Bora–Hansgrohe)
	Third	Michael Mørkøv (DEN)	(Deceuninck–Quick-Step)

The 2019 Prudential RideLondon–Surrey Classic was a road cycling one-day race that took place on 4 August in London, England. It was the eighth edition of the London–Surrey Classic and was the thirtieth event of the 2019 UCI World Tour.

Defending champion Pascal Ackermann did not return to defend his title. In his absence, Elia Viviani took the win with Ackermann's teammate Sam Bennett coming in second. Viviani's teammate Michael Mørkøv held off Jasper Stuyven for the final podium place.

== Teams ==
Twenty teams of up to seven riders participated in the race:

UCI WorldTeams

- AG2R La Mondiale
- Bahrain–Merida
- Bora–Hansgrohe
- CCC Team
- Deceuninck–Quick-Step
- EF Education First
- Groupama–FDJ
- Lotto–Soudal
- Mitchelton–Scott
- Team Dimension Data
- Team Ineos
- Team Jumbo–Visma
- Team Katusha–Alpecin
- Team Sunweb
- Trek–Segafredo
- UAE Team Emirates

UCI Professional Continental teams

- Delko–Marseille Provence
- Israel Cycling Academy
- Total Direct Énergie

National Teams

- Great Britain

== Results ==
Result
Rank	Rider	Team	Time
1	Elia Viviani (ITA)	Deceuninck–Quick-Step	3h 46' 16"
2	Sam Bennett (IRL)	Bora–Hansgrohe	+ 0"
3	Michael Mørkøv (DEN)	Deceuninck–Quick-Step	+ 0"
4	Jasper Stuyven (BEL)	Trek–Segafredo	+ 0"
5	Amund Grøndahl Jansen (NOR)	Team Jumbo–Visma	+ 0"
6	Giacomo Nizzolo (ITA)	Team Dimension Data	+ 0"
7	Alexander Kristoff (NOR)	UAE Team Emirates	+ 0"
8	Oliver Naesen (BEL)	AG2R La Mondiale	+ 0"
9	Jasper De Buyst (BEL)	Lotto–Soudal	+ 0"
10	Ethan Hayter (GBR)	Great Britain	+ 0"
