= 2021 Ineos Grenadiers season =

INEOS Grenadiers
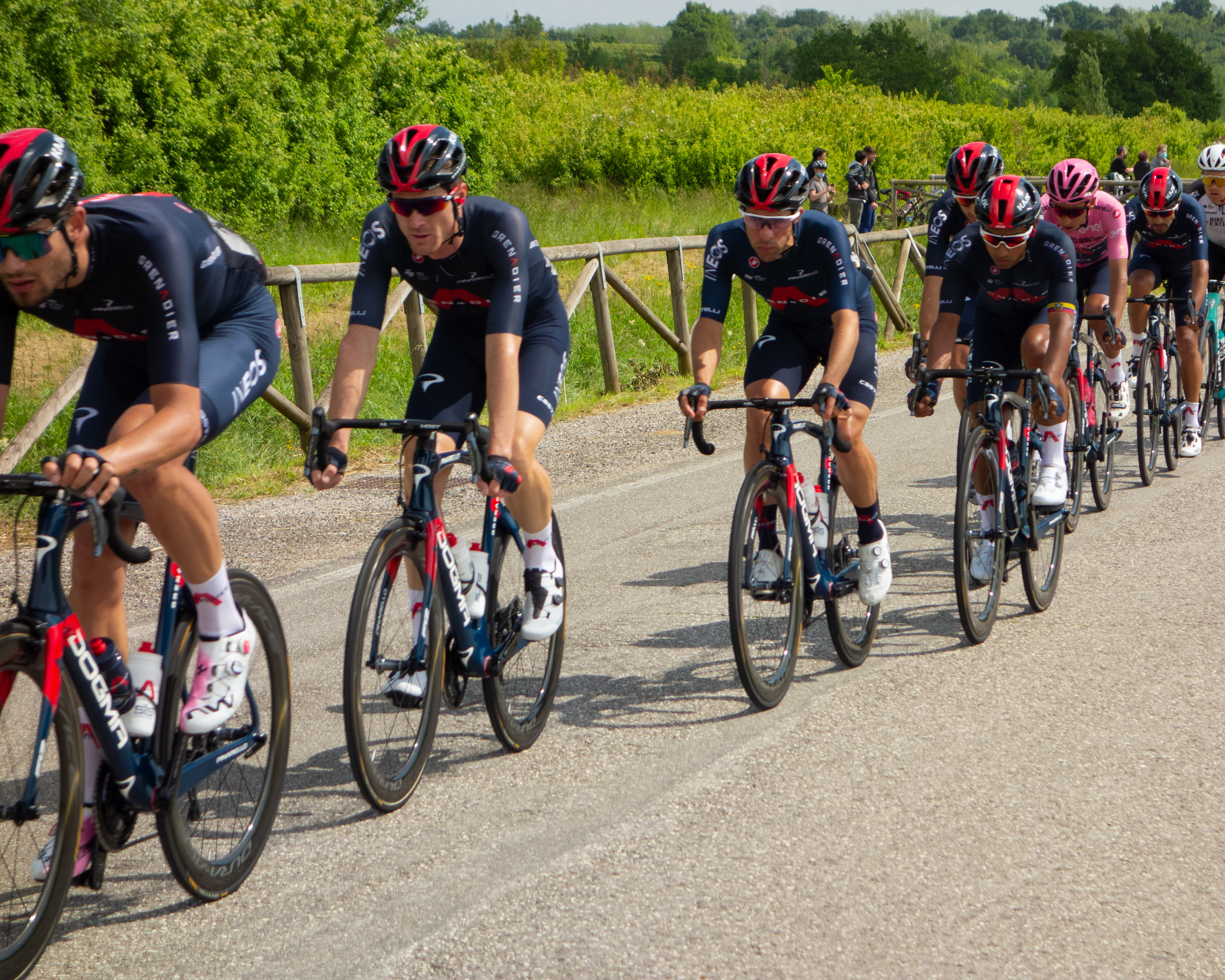
- INEOS Grenadiers leading the peloton on Stage 15 of the Giro d'Italia with Egan Bernal wearing the maglia rosa
- UCI code: IGD
- Status: UCI WorldTeam
- World Tour Rank: 2nd
- Manager: Dave Brailsford (GBR)
- Main sponsor(s): Ineos
- Based: National Cycling Centre, Manchester; England
- Bicycles: Pinarello
- Groupset: Shimano

Season victories
- One-day races: 3
- Stage race overall: 7
- Stage race stages: 23
- Grand Tours: 1
- World Championships: 1
- National Championships: 3
- Most wins: Ethan Hayter (GBR) (13)
- Best ranked rider: Egan Bernal (COL) (5th)
- Jersey

The 2021 season for INEOS Grenadiers was the eleventh season in the team's existence, all of which have been as a UCI WorldTeam. This was the third season with Ineos as the title sponsor and the first full season with the current name.

== Team roster ==
As of 1 August 2021.

Rider	Date of birth
Andrey Amador (CRC)	29 August 1986 (aged 34)
Leonardo Basso (ITA)	25 December 1993 (aged 27)
Egan Bernal (COL)	13 January 1997 (aged 23)
Richard Carapaz (ECU)	29 May 1993 (aged 27)
Jonathan Castroviejo (ESP)	27 April 1987 (aged 33)
Laurens De Plus (BEL)	4 September 1995 (aged 25)
Rohan Dennis (AUS)	28 May 1990 (aged 30)
Owain Doull (GBR)	2 May 1993 (aged 27)
Eddie Dunbar (IRL)	1 September 1996 (aged 24)
Filippo Ganna (ITA)	25 July 1996 (aged 24)
Tao Geoghegan Hart (GBR)	30 March 1995 (aged 25)
Michał Gołaś (POL)	29 April 1984 (aged 36)
Ethan Hayter (GBR)	18 September 1998 (aged 22)
Sebastián Henao (COL)	5 August 1993 (aged 27)
Michał Kwiatkowski (POL)	2 June 1990 (aged 30)
Daniel Martínez (COL)	April 25, 1996 (aged 24)

Rider	Date of birth
Gianni Moscon (ITA)	20 April 1994 (aged 26)
Jhonatan Narváez (ECU)	4 March 1997 (aged 23)
Tom Pidcock (GBR)	30 July 1999 (aged 21)
Luke Plapp (Note: Plapp joined as a stagiaire from Inform TM Insight Make on 1 August.) (AUS)	25 December 2000 (aged 20)
Richie Porte (AUS)	30 January 1985 (aged 35)
Salvatore Puccio (ITA)	31 August 1989 (aged 31)
Brandon Rivera (COL)	21 March 1996 (aged 24)
Carlos Rodriguez (ESP)	2 February 2001 (aged 19)
Luke Rowe (GBR)	10 March 1990 (aged 30)
Pavel Sivakov (RUS)	11 July 1997 (aged 23)
Iván Sosa (COL)	31 October 1997 (aged 23)
Ben Swift (GBR)	5 November 1987 (aged 33)
Geraint Thomas (GBR)	25 May 1986 (aged 34)
Dylan van Baarle (NED)	21 May 1992 (aged 28)
Cameron Wurf (AUS)	3 August 1983 (aged 37)
Adam Yates (GBR)	7 August 1992 (aged 28)

Riders who joined the team for the 2021 season

Rider	2020 team
Laurens De Plus	Team Jumbo–Visma
Daniel Martínez	EF Pro Cycling
Tom Pidcock	neo-pro (Trinity Racing)
Richie Porte	Trek–Segafredo
Adam Yates	Mitchelton–Scott

Riders who left the team during or after the 2020 season

Rider	2021 team
Chris Froome	Israel Start-Up Nation
Vasil Kiryienka (Note: Kiryienka retired on 30 January 2020 due to recurring cardiac issues.)	Retired
Christian Knees	Retired
Chris Lawless	Total Direct Énergie
Ian Stannard	Retired

== Season victories ==
Date	Race	Competition	Rider	Country	Location	Ref.
6 February	Étoile de Bessèges, Stage 4	UCI Europe Tour	Filippo Ganna (ITA)	France	Saint-Siffret	
7 February	Étoile de Bessèges, Stage 5 (ITT)	UCI Europe Tour	Filippo Ganna (ITA)	France	Alès	
13 February	Tour de la Provence, Stage 3	UCI Europe Tour; UCI ProSeries	Iván Sosa (COL)	France	Mont Ventoux–Chalet Reynard	
14 February	Tour de la Provence, Overall	UCI Europe Tour; UCI ProSeries	Iván Sosa (COL)	France		
14 February	Tour de la Provence, Young rider classification	UCI Europe Tour; UCI ProSeries	Iván Sosa (COL)	France		
14 February	Tour de la Provence, Team classification	UCI Europe Tour; UCI ProSeries	(Note: The riders in the squad were Egan Bernal, Laurens De Plus, Eddie Dunbar, Gianni Moscon, Carlos Rodriguez, Iván Sosa and Ben Swift.)	France		
22 February	UAE Tour, Stage 2 (ITT)	UCI World Tour	Filippo Ganna (ITA)	United Arab Emirates	Al Hudayriat Island	
23 March	Volta a Catalunya, Stage 2 (ITT)	UCI World Tour	Rohan Dennis (AUS)	Spain	Banyoles	
24 March	Volta a Catalunya, Stage 3	UCI World Tour	Adam Yates (GBR)	Spain	Vallter 2000	
25 March	Settimana Internazionale di Coppi e Bartali, Stage 3	UCI Europe Tour	Ethan Hayter (GBR)	Italy	Riccione	
27 March	Settimana Internazionale di Coppi e Bartali, Young rider classification	UCI Europe Tour	Ethan Hayter (GBR)	Italy		
27 March	Settimana Internazionale di Coppi e Bartali, Team classification	UCI Europe Tour	(Note: The riders in the squad were Eddie Dunbar, Ethan Hayter, Sebastián Henao, Gianni Moscon, Carlos Rodriguez, Iván Sosa and Ben Swift.)	Italy		
28 March	Volta a Catalunya, Overall	UCI World Tour	Adam Yates (GBR)	Spain		
28 March	Volta a Catalunya, Team classification	UCI World Tour	(Note: The riders in the squad were Richard Carapaz, Jonathan Castroviejo, Rohan Dennis, Richie Porte, Luke Rowe, Geraint Thomas, and Adam Yates.)	Spain		
31 March	Dwars door Vlaanderen	UCI World Tour	Dylan van Baarle (NED)	Belgium	Waregem	
14 April	Brabantse Pijl	UCI Europe Tour; UCI ProSeries	Tom Pidcock (GBR)	Belgium	Overijse	
19 April	Tour of the Alps, Stage 1	UCI Europe Tour; UCI ProSeries	Gianni Moscon (ITA)	Austria	Innsbruck	
21 April	Tour of the Alps, Stage 3	UCI Europe Tour; UCI ProSeries	Gianni Moscon (ITA)	Italy	Naturns	
23 April	Tour of the Alps, Team classification	UCI Europe Tour; UCI ProSeries	(Note: The riders in the squad were Leonardo Basso, Sebastián Henao, Daniel Martínez, Gianni Moscon, Salvatore Puccio, Pavel Sivakov, and Iván Sosa.)	Italy		
27 April	Tour de Romandie, Prologue (ITT)	UCI World Tour	Rohan Dennis (AUS)	Switzerland	Oron	
2 May	Tour de Romandie, Overall	UCI World Tour	Geraint Thomas (GBR)	Switzerland		
2 May	Tour de Romandie, Team classification	UCI World Tour	(Note: The riders in the squad were Andrey Amador, Rohan Dennis, Owain Doull, Eddie Dunbar, Filippo Ganna, Richie Porte, and Geraint Thomas.)	Switzerland		
6 May	Volta ao Algarve, Stage 2	UCI Europe Tour; UCI ProSeries	Ethan Hayter (GBR)	Portugal	Fóia	
8 May	Giro d'Italia, Stage 1 (ITT)	UCI World Tour	Filippo Ganna (ITA)	Italy	Turin	
16 May	Giro d'Italia, Stage 9	UCI World Tour	Egan Bernal (COL)	Italy	Campo Felice (Rocca di Cambio)	
19 May	Vuelta a Andalucía, Stage 2	UCI Europe Tour; UCI ProSeries	Ethan Hayter (GBR)	Spain	Alcalá la Real	
22 May	Vuelta a Andalucía, Stage 5	UCI Europe Tour; UCI ProSeries	Ethan Hayter (GBR)	Spain	Pulpí	
22 May	Vuelta a Andalucía, Points classification	UCI Europe Tour; UCI ProSeries	Ethan Hayter (GBR)	Spain		
24 May	Giro d'Italia, Stage 16	UCI World Tour	Egan Bernal (COL)	Italy	Cortina d'Ampezzo	
24 May	Giro d'Italia, Stage 21 (ITT)	UCI World Tour	Filippo Ganna (ITA)	Italy	Milan	
30 May	Giro d'Italia, Overall	UCI World Tour	Egan Bernal (COL)	Italy		
30 May	Giro d'Italia, Young rider classification	UCI World Tour	Egan Bernal (COL)	Italy		
30 May	Giro d'Italia, Team classification	UCI World Tour	(Note: The riders in the squad were Egan Bernal, Jonathan Castroviejo, Filippo Ganna, Daniel Martínez, Gianni Moscon, Jhonatan Narváez, Salvatore Puccio, and Pavel Sivakov.)	Italy		
3 June	Critérium du Dauphiné, Stage 5	UCI World Tour	Geraint Thomas (GBR)	France	Saint-Vallier	
6 June	Critérium du Dauphiné, Overall	UCI World Tour	Richie Porte (AUS)	France		
6 June	Critérium du Dauphiné, Team classification	UCI World Tour	(Note: The riders in the squad were Andrey Amador, Tao Geoghegan Hart, Michał Kwiatkowski, Richie Porte, Carlos Rodriguez, Geraint Thomas, and Dylan van Baarle.)	France		
10 June	Tour de Suisse, Stage 5	UCI World Tour	Richard Carapaz (ECU)	Switzerland	Leukerbad	
13 June	Tour de Suisse, Overall	UCI World Tour	Richard Carapaz (ECU)	Switzerland		
13 June	Tour de Suisse, Young rider classification	UCI World Tour	Eddie Dunbar (IRL)	Switzerland		
27 June	Gran Premio di Lugano	UCI Europe Tour	Gianni Moscon (ITA)	Switzerland	Lugano	
19 August	Tour of Norway, Stage 1	UCI Europe Tour; UCI ProSeries	Ethan Hayter (GBR)	Norway	Sokndal	
20 August	Tour of Norway, Stage 2	UCI Europe Tour; UCI ProSeries	Ethan Hayter (GBR)	Norway	Sirdal	
22 August	Tour of Norway, Overall	UCI Europe Tour; UCI ProSeries	Ethan Hayter (GBR)	Norway		
7 September	Tour of Britain, Stage 3 (TTT)	UCI Europe Tour; UCI ProSeries	(Note: The winning riders were Rohan Dennis, Owain Doull, Ethan Hayter, Michał Kwiatkowski, Richie Porte, and Carlos Rodriguez.)	United Kingdom	National Botanic Garden of Wales	
9 September	Tour of Britain, Stage 5	UCI Europe Tour; UCI ProSeries	Ethan Hayter (GBR)	United Kingdom	Warrington	
12 September	Tour of Britain, Points classification	UCI Europe Tour; UCI ProSeries	Ethan Hayter (GBR)	United Kingdom		

== National, Continental, and World Champions ==
Date	Discipline	Jersey	Rider	Country	Location	Ref.
19 September	World Time Trial Championships		Filippo Ganna (ITA)	Belgium	Bruges	
14 October	British National Time Trial Championships		Ethan Hayter (GBR)	United Kingdom	Tealby	
15 October	British National Circuit Race Championships		Ethan Hayter (GBR)	United Kingdom	Lincoln	
17 October	British National Road Race Championships		Ben Swift (GBR)	United Kingdom	Lincoln	
23 October	World Omnium Championships		Ethan Hayter (GBR)	France	Roubaix	
