= 2021 Étoile de Bessèges =

2021 UCI Europe Tour

Race details
- Dates: 3–7 February 2021
- Stages: 5
- Distance: 614.79 km (382.01 mi)
- Winning time: 13h 56' 23"

Results
Jersey awarded to the overall winner	Winner	Tim Wellens (BEL)	(Lotto–Soudal)
	Second	Michał Kwiatkowski (POL)	(INEOS Grenadiers)
	Third	Nils Politt (GER)	(Bora–Hansgrohe)
Jersey awarded to the points classification winner	Points	Christophe Laporte (FRA)	(Cofidis)
Jersey awarded to the mountains classification winner	Mountains	Alexandre Delettre (FRA)	(Delko)
Jersey awarded to the young rider classification winner	Young rider	Jake Stewart (GBR)	(Groupama–FDJ)
	Team	Lotto–Soudal	

The 2021 Étoile de Bessèges (transl. Star of Bessèges) was a road cycling stage race that took place between 3 and 7 February 2021 mostly in the French department of Gard. The race was rated as a 2.1 event as part of the 2021 UCI Europe Tour, and was the 51st edition of the Étoile de Bessèges cycling race.

== Teams ==
Twenty-two teams were invited to the race. The invited teams include eleven UCI WorldTeams, eight UCI ProTeams, and three UCI Continental teams. Each team entered seven riders, except for Cambodia Cycling Academy, which entered five. Before the race began, Sport Vlaanderen–Baloise withdrew after one of the team's management was suspected of having COVID-19. Of the 145 riders that started the race, 135 finished.

UCI WorldTeams

- AG2R Citroën Team
- Bora–Hansgrohe
- Cofidis
- EF Education–Nippo
- Groupama–FDJ
- INEOS Grenadiers
- Intermarché–Wanty–Gobert Matériaux
- Israel Start-Up Nation
- Lotto–Soudal
- Team Qhubeka Assos
- Trek–Segafredo

UCI ProTeams

- Alpecin–Fenix
- Arkéa–Samsic
- B&B Hotels p/b KTM
- Bingoal WB
- Delko
- Equipo Kern Pharma
- ~~Sport Vlaanderen–Baloise~~
- Total Direct Énergie

UCI Continental Teams

- Cambodia Cycling Academy
- St. Michel–Auber93
- Xelliss–Roubaix–Lille Métropole

== Route ==
Stage characteristics and winners
Stage	Date	Course	Distance	Type	Stage winner
1	3 February	Bellegarde to Bellegarde	143.55 km (89.20 mi)	Hilly stage	Christophe Laporte (FRA)
2	4 February	Saint-Geniès-de-Malgoirès to La Calmette	154.12 km (95.77 mi)	Hilly stage	Timothy Dupont (BEL)
3	5 February	Bessèges to Bessèges	154.81 km (96.19 mi)	Hilly stage	Tim Wellens (BEL)
4	6 February	Rousson to Saint-Siffret	151.60 km (94.20 mi)	Hilly stage	Filippo Ganna (ITA)
5	7 February	Alès to Alès	10.71 km (6.65 mi)	Individual time trial	Filippo Ganna (ITA)
Total		614.79 km (382.01 mi)			

== Stages ==
=== Stage 1 ===
3 February 2021 – Bellegarde to Bellegarde, 143.55 km (89.20 mi)

Stage 1 Result
Rank	Rider	Team	Time
1	Christophe Laporte (FRA)	Cofidis	3h 14' 32"
2	Nacer Bouhanni (FRA)	Arkéa–Samsic	+ 0"
3	Mads Pedersen (DEN)	Trek–Segafredo	+ 2"
4	Giacomo Nizzolo (ITA)	Team Qhubeka Assos	+ 2"
5	Michał Kwiatkowski (POL)	INEOS Grenadiers	+ 2"
6	Jordi Meeus (BEL)	Bora–Hansgrohe	+ 2"
7	Bryan Coquard (FRA)	B&B Hotels p/b KTM	+ 2"
8	John Degenkolb (GER)	Lotto–Soudal	+ 2"
9	Jake Stewart (GBR)	Groupama–FDJ	+ 2"
10	Danny van Poppel (NED)	Intermarché–Wanty–Gobert Matériaux	+ 2"

General classification after Stage 1
Rank	Rider	Team	Time
1	Christophe Laporte (FRA)	Cofidis	3h 14' 22"
2	Nacer Bouhanni (FRA)	Arkéa–Samsic	+ 4"
3	Mads Pedersen (DEN)	Trek–Segafredo	+ 8"
4	Giacomo Nizzolo (ITA)	Team Qhubeka Assos	+ 12"
5	Michał Kwiatkowski (POL)	INEOS Grenadiers	+ 12"
6	Jordi Meeus (BEL)	Bora–Hansgrohe	+ 12"
7	Bryan Coquard (FRA)	B&B Hotels p/b KTM	+ 12"
8	John Degenkolb (GER)	Lotto–Soudal	+ 12"
9	Jake Stewart (GBR)	Groupama–FDJ	+ 12"
10	Danny van Poppel (NED)	Intermarché–Wanty–Gobert Matériaux	+ 12"

=== Stage 2 ===
4 February 2021 – Saint-Geniès-de-Malgoirès to La Calmette, 154.12 km (95.77 mi)

Stage 2 Result
Rank	Rider	Team	Time
1	Timothy Dupont (BEL)	Bingoal WB	3h 35' 15"
2	Pierre Barbier (FRA)	Delko	+ 0"
3	Giacomo Nizzolo (ITA)	Team Qhubeka Assos	+ 0"
4	Rudy Barbier (FRA)	Israel Start-Up Nation	+ 0"
5	Christophe Laporte (FRA)	Cofidis	+ 0"
6	Nacer Bouhanni (FRA)	Arkéa–Samsic	+ 0"
7	Marc Sarreau (FRA)	AG2R Citroën Team	+ 0"
8	Gerben Thijssen (BEL)	Lotto–Soudal	+ 0"
9	Silvan Dillier (SUI)	Alpecin–Fenix	+ 0"
10	Edward Theuns (BEL)	Trek–Segafredo	+ 0"

General classification after Stage 2
Rank	Rider	Team	Time
1	Christophe Laporte (FRA)	Cofidis	6h 49' 37"
2	Timothy Dupont (BEL)	Bingoal WB	+ 2"
3	Nacer Bouhanni (FRA)	Arkéa–Samsic	+ 4"
4	Pierre Barbier (FRA)	Delko	+ 6"
5	Ludovic Robeet (BEL)	Bingoal WB	+ 7"
6	Giacomo Nizzolo (ITA)	Team Qhubeka Assos	+ 8"
7	Mads Pedersen (DEN)	Trek–Segafredo	+ 8"
8	Tony Hurel (FRA)	St. Michel–Auber93	+ 9"
9	Alexandre Delettre (FRA)	Delko	+ 11"
10	Bryan Coquard (FRA)	B&B Hotels p/b KTM	+ 12"

=== Stage 3 ===
5 February 2021 – Bessèges to Bessèges, 154.81 km (96.19 mi)

Stage 3 Result
Rank	Rider	Team	Time
1	Tim Wellens (BEL)	Lotto–Soudal	3h 28' 02"
2	Edward Theuns (BEL)	Trek–Segafredo	+ 37"
3	Mads Würtz Schmidt (DEN)	Israel Start-Up Nation	+ 37"
4	Greg Van Avermaet (BEL)	AG2R Citroën Team	+ 37"
5	Philippe Gilbert (BEL)	Lotto–Soudal	+ 37"
6	Cyril Barthe (FRA)	B&B Hotels p/b KTM	+ 37"
7	Jake Stewart (GBR)	Groupama–FDJ	+ 37"
8	Nils Politt (GER)	Bora–Hansgrohe	+ 37"
9	Michael Gogl (AUT)	Team Qhubeka Assos	+ 37"
10	Michał Kwiatkowski (POL)	INEOS Grenadiers	+ 37"

General classification after Stage 3
Rank	Rider	Team	Time
1	Tim Wellens (BEL)	Lotto–Soudal	10h 17' 38"
2	Edward Theuns (BEL)	Trek–Segafredo	+ 44"
3	Mads Würtz Schmidt (DEN)	Israel Start-Up Nation	+ 46"
4	Michał Kwiatkowski (POL)	INEOS Grenadiers	+ 48"
5	Philippe Gilbert (BEL)	Lotto–Soudal	+ 49"
6	Jake Stewart (GBR)	Groupama–FDJ	+ 50"
7	Greg Van Avermaet (BEL)	AG2R Citroën Team	+ 50"
8	Michael Gogl (AUT)	Team Qhubeka Assos	+ 50"
9	Cyril Barthe (FRA)	B&B Hotels p/b KTM	+ 50"
10	Stefano Oldani (ITA)	Lotto–Soudal	+ 50"

=== Stage 4 ===
6 February 2021 – Rousson to Saint-Siffret, 151.60 km (94.20 mi)

Stage 4 Result
Rank	Rider	Team	Time
1	Filippo Ganna (ITA)	INEOS Grenadiers	3h 22' 59"
2	Christophe Laporte (FRA)	Cofidis	+ 17"
3	Pascal Ackermann (GER)	Bora–Hansgrohe	+ 17"
4	Greg Van Avermaet (BEL)	AG2R Citroën Team	+ 17"
5	Milan Menten (BEL)	Bingoal WB	+ 17"
6	Bryan Coquard (FRA)	B&B Hotels p/b KTM	+ 17"
7	Cyril Barthe (FRA)	B&B Hotels p/b KTM	+ 17"
8	Nils Politt (GER)	Bora–Hansgrohe	+ 17"
9	August Jensen (NOR)	Delko	+ 17"
10	Mads Würtz Schmidt (DEN)	Israel Start-Up Nation	+ 17"

General classification after Stage 4
Rank	Rider	Team	Time
1	Tim Wellens (BEL)	Lotto–Soudal	13h 40' 54"
2	Edward Theuns (BEL)	Trek–Segafredo	+ 44"
3	Mads Würtz Schmidt (DEN)	Israel Start-Up Nation	+ 46"
4	Michał Kwiatkowski (POL)	INEOS Grenadiers	+ 48"
5	Philippe Gilbert (BEL)	Lotto–Soudal	+ 49"
6	Greg Van Avermaet (BEL)	AG2R Citroën Team	+ 50"
7	Jake Stewart (GBR)	Groupama–FDJ	+ 50"
8	Nils Politt (GER)	Bora–Hansgrohe	+ 50"
9	Odd Christian Eiking (NOR)	Intermarché–Wanty–Gobert Matériaux	+ 50"
10	Michael Gogl (AUT)	Team Qhubeka Assos	+ 58"

=== Stage 5 ===
7 February 2021 – Alès to Alès, 10.71 km (6.65 mi), (ITT)

Stage 5 Result
Rank	Rider	Team	Time
1	Filippo Ganna (ITA)	INEOS Grenadiers	15' 00"
2	Benjamin Thomas (FRA)	Groupama–FDJ	+ 10"
3	Ethan Hayter (GBR)	INEOS Grenadiers	+ 21"
4	Tim Wellens (BEL)	Lotto–Soudal	+ 29"
5	Christophe Laporte (FRA)	Cofidis	+ 31"
6	Michał Kwiatkowski (POL)	INEOS Grenadiers	+ 34"
7	Alberto Bettiol (ITA)	EF Education–Nippo	+ 35"
8	Owain Doull (GBR)	INEOS Grenadiers	+ 38"
9	Nils Politt (GER)	Bora–Hansgrohe	+ 38"
10	Jake Stewart (GBR)	Groupama–FDJ	+ 42"

General classification after Stage 5
Rank	Rider	Team	Time
1	Tim Wellens (BEL)	Lotto–Soudal	13h 56' 23"
2	Michał Kwiatkowski (POL)	INEOS Grenadiers	+ 53"
3	Nils Politt (GER)	Bora–Hansgrohe	+ 59"
4	Jake Stewart (GBR)	Groupama–FDJ	+ 1' 02"
5	Mads Würtz Schmidt (DEN)	Israel Start-Up Nation	+ 1' 19"
6	Michael Gogl (AUT)	Team Qhubeka Assos	+ 1' 24"
7	Greg Van Avermaet (BEL)	AG2R Citroën Team	+ 1' 25"
8	Edward Theuns (BEL)	Trek–Segafredo	+ 1' 36"
9	Clément Carisey (FRA)	Delko	+ 1' 41"
10	Odd Christian Eiking (NOR)	Intermarché–Wanty–Gobert Matériaux	+ 1' 45"

== Classification leadership table ==
Classification leadership by stage
Stage	Winner	General classification	Points classification	Mountains classification	Youth classification	Team classification
1	Christophe Laporte	Christophe Laporte	Christophe Laporte	Alexandre Delettre	Jordi Meeus	Arkéa–Samsic
2	Timothy Dupont	Christophe Laporte	Christophe Laporte	Alexandre Delettre	Jake Stewart	Arkéa–Samsic
3	Tim Wellens	Tim Wellens	Christophe Laporte	Alexandre Delettre	Jake Stewart	Lotto–Soudal
4	Filippo Ganna	Tim Wellens	Christophe Laporte	Alexandre Delettre	Jake Stewart	Lotto–Soudal
5	Filippo Ganna	Tim Wellens	Christophe Laporte	Alexandre Delettre	Jake Stewart	Lotto–Soudal
Final		Tim Wellens	Christophe Laporte	Alexandre Delettre	Jake Stewart	Lotto–Soudal

== Final classification standings ==
Legend
Denotes the winner of the general classification	Denotes the winner of the mountains classification
Denotes the winner of the points classification	Denotes the winner of the young rider classification

=== General classification ===
Final general classification (1–10)
Rank	Rider	Team	Time
1	Tim Wellens (BEL)	Lotto–Soudal	13h 56' 23"
2	Michał Kwiatkowski (POL)	INEOS Grenadiers	+ 53"
3	Nils Politt (GER)	Bora–Hansgrohe	+ 59"
4	Jake Stewart (GBR)	Groupama–FDJ	+ 1' 02"
5	Mads Würtz Schmidt (DEN)	Israel Start-Up Nation	+ 1' 19"
6	Michael Gogl (AUT)	Team Qhubeka Assos	+ 1' 24"
7	Greg Van Avermaet (BEL)	AG2R Citroën Team	+ 1' 25"
8	Edward Theuns (BEL)	Trek–Segafredo	+ 1' 36"
9	Clément Carisey (FRA)	Delko	+ 1' 41"
10	Odd Christian Eiking (NOR)	Intermarché–Wanty–Gobert Matériaux	+ 1' 45"

=== Points classification ===
Final points classification (1–10)
Rank	Rider	Team	Points
1	Christophe Laporte (FRA)	Cofidis	69
2	Filippo Ganna (ITA)	INEOS Grenadiers	56
3	Tim Wellens (BEL)	Lotto–Soudal	49
4	Michał Kwiatkowski (POL)	INEOS Grenadiers	32
5	Edward Theuns (BEL)	Trek–Segafredo	31
6	Giacomo Nizzolo (ITA)	Team Qhubeka Assos	31
7	Nacer Bouhanni (FRA)	Arkéa–Samsic	30
8	Greg Van Avermaet (BEL)	AG2R Citroën Team	29
9	Timothy Dupont (BEL)	Bingoal WB	25
10	Mads Würtz Schmidt (DEN)	Israel Start-Up Nation	24

=== Mountains classification ===
Final mountains classification (1–10)
Rank	Rider	Team	Points
1	Alexandre Delettre (FRA)	Delko	28
2	Ludovic Robeet (BEL)	Bingoal WB	18
3	Tim Wellens (BEL)	Lotto–Soudal	14
4	Michał Kwiatkowski (POL)	INEOS Grenadiers	10
5	Ethan Hayter (GBR)	INEOS Grenadiers	10
6	Filippo Ganna (ITA)	INEOS Grenadiers	10
7	Alexys Brunel (FRA)	Groupama–FDJ	8
8	Rigoberto Urán (COL)	EF Education–Nippo	8
9	Anthony Perez (FRA)	Cofidis	8
10	Vojtěch Řepa (CZE)	Equipo Kern Pharma	8

=== Young rider classification ===
Final young rider classification (1–10)
Rank	Rider	Team	Time
1	Jake Stewart (GBR)	Groupama–FDJ	13h 57' 25"
2	Stefano Oldani (ITA)	Lotto–Soudal	+ 1' 26"
3	Roger Adrià (ESP)	Equipo Kern Pharma	+ 2' 46"
4	Alexys Brunel (FRA)	Groupama–FDJ	+ 3' 09"
5	Raúl García (ESP)	Equipo Kern Pharma	+ 3' 43"
6	Tobias Bayer (AUT)	Alpecin–Fenix	+ 4' 02"
7	Brent Van Moer (BEL)	Lotto–Soudal	+ 4' 43"
8	Andreas Kron (DEN)	Lotto–Soudal	+ 4' 53"
9	Matis Louvel (FRA)	Arkéa–Samsic	+ 5' 43"
10	Mattias Skjelmose Jensen (DEN)	Trek–Segafredo	+ 10' 39"

=== Team classification ===
Final team classification (1–10)
Rank	Team	Time
1	Lotto–Soudal	41h 53' 02"
2	INEOS Grenadiers	+ 57"
3	Groupama–FDJ	+ 4' 41"
4	Equipo Kern Pharma	+ 5' 45"
5	Bora–Hansgrohe	+ 5' 56"
6	Trek–Segafredo	+ 6' 16"
7	AG2R Citroën Team	+ 6' 34"
8	Israel Start-Up Nation	+ 6' 45"
9	Team Qhubeka Assos	+ 6' 49"
10	B&B Hotels p/b KTM	+ 6' 55"
