= 2015 Étoile de Bessèges =

2015 UCI Europe Tour

Race details
- Dates: 4–8 February 2015
- Stages: 5
- Distance: 620.12 km (385.3 mi)
- Winning time: 15h 43' 21"

Results
Jersey awarded to the overall winner	Winner	Bob Jungels (LUX)	(Trek Factory Racing)
	Second	Tony Gallopin (FRA)	(Lotto–Soudal)
	Third	Kris Boeckmans (BEL)	(Lotto–Soudal)
Jersey awarded to the points classification winner	Points	Edward Theuns (BEL)	(Topsport Vlaanderen–Baloise)
Jersey awarded to the mountains classification winner	Mountains	Julien Loubet (FRA)	(Team Marseille 13 KTM)
Jersey awarded to the youth classification winner	Youth	Alexis Gougeard (FRA)	(AG2R La Mondiale)
	Team	Trek Factory Racing	

The 2015 Étoile de Bessèges (English: Star of Bessèges) was the 45th running of the Étoile de Bessèges road cycling stage race. It was rated as a 2.1 event on the UCI Europe Tour and took place from 4 to 8 February 2015 in southern France, near the town of Bessèges. It was the first stage race of the 2015 European season.

The race consisted of five stages, four of which were road stages and the last of which was an individual time trial. The 2014 champion was Tobias Ludvigsson, but his Team Giant–Alpecin was not selected to take part in the 2015 edition.

The race was won by Bob Jungels (Trek Factory Racing), who won the time trial on the final day. He finished nine seconds ahead of the second placed rider, Lotto–Soudal's Tony Gallopin, with Gallopin's teammate Kris Boeckmans a further second back in third place. Edward Theuns (Topsport Vlaanderen–Baloise) won the points competition, while Julien Loubet (Team Marseille 13 KTM) won the mountains competition. The best young rider was Alexis Gougeard (AG2R La Mondiale). Trek Factory Racing were the best team.

== Teams ==
Twenty-one teams competed in the 2015 Étoile de Bessèges. These included four UCI WorldTeams, nine UCI Professional Continental and eight UCI Continental teams.

The teams that participated in the race were:

- AG2R La Mondiale
- An Post–Chain Reaction
- Armée de Terre
- Auber 93
- Bretagne–Séché Environnement
- Caja Rural–Seguros RGA
- CCC–Sprandi–Polkowice
- Cofidis
- Colombia
- Team Europcar
- FDJ
- Lotto–Soudal
- Team Marseille 13 KTM
- Team Roompot
- Roth–Škoda
- Roubaix–Lille Métropole
- Topsport Vlaanderen–Baloise
- Trek Factory Racing
- Veranclassic–Ekoi
- Wallonie-Bruxelles
- Wanty–Groupe Gobert

== Route ==
List of stages
Stage	Date	Course	Distance	Type	Winner
1	4 February	Bellegarde to Beaucaire	154 km (95.7 mi)	Flat stage	Kris Boeckmans (BEL)
2	5 February	Nîmes to Les Fumades	154.5 km (96.0 mi)	Flat stage	Roy Jans (BEL)
3	6 February	Bessèges to Bessèges	152.6 km (94.8 mi)	Flat stage	Bryan Coquard (FRA)
4	7 February	L'Ardoise to Laudun	147.1 km (91.4 mi)	Hilly stage	Tony Gallopin (FRA)
5	8 February	Alès to Alès	11.92 km (7.4 mi)	Individual time trial	Bob Jungels (LUX)

== Stages ==
=== Stage 1 ===
4 February 2015 — Bellegarde to Beaucaire, 154 km (95.7 mi)

Stage 1 result
Rank	Rider	Team	Time
1	Kris Boeckmans (BEL)	Lotto–Soudal	3h 25' 37"
2	Edward Theuns (BEL)	Topsport Vlaanderen–Baloise	+ 0"
3	Marco Coledan (ITA)	Trek Factory Racing	+ 0"
4	Cyril Gautier (FRA)	Team Europcar	+ 0"
5	Julien Duval (FRA)	Armée de Terre	+ 0"
6	Evaldas Šiškevičius (LTU)	Team Marseille 13 KTM	+ 0"
7	Arnaud Courteille (FRA)	FDJ	+ 0"
8	Alexis Gougeard (FRA)	AG2R La Mondiale	+ 0"
9	Loïc Chetout (FRA)	Cofidis	+ 0"
10	Brian van Goethem (NED)	Team Roompot	+ 0"

General classification after stage 1
Rank	Rider	Team	Time
1	Kris Boeckmans (BEL)	Lotto–Soudal	3h 25' 27"
2	Edward Theuns (BEL)	Topsport Vlaanderen–Baloise	+ 4"
3	Marco Coledan (ITA)	Trek Factory Racing	+ 6"
4	Cyril Gautier (FRA)	Team Europcar	+ 10"
5	Julien Duval (FRA)	Armée de Terre	+ 10"
6	Evaldas Šiškevičius (LTU)	Team Marseille 13 KTM	+ 10"
7	Arnaud Courteille (FRA)	FDJ	+ 10"
8	Alexis Gougeard (FRA)	AG2R La Mondiale	+ 10"
9	Loïc Chetout (FRA)	Cofidis	+ 10"
10	Brian van Goethem (NED)	Team Roompot	+ 10"

=== Stage 2 ===
5 February 2015 — Nîmes to Les Fumades, 154.5 km (96.0 mi)

Stage 2 result
Rank	Rider	Team	Time
1	Roy Jans (BEL)	Wanty–Groupe Gobert	4h 27' 54"
2	Alexandre Blain (FRA)	Team Marseille 13 KTM	+ 0"
3	Bob Jungels (LUX)	Trek Factory Racing	+ 0"
4	Marco Coledan (ITA)	Trek Factory Racing	+ 0"
5	Yannick Martinez (FRA)	Team Europcar	+ 0"
6	Olivier Chevalier (BEL)	Wallonie-Bruxelles	+ 0"
7	Antoine Demoitié (BEL)	Wallonie-Bruxelles	+ 0"
8	Baptiste Planckaert (BEL)	Roubaix–Lille Métropole	+ 0"
9	Edward Theuns (BEL)	Topsport Vlaanderen–Baloise	+ 0"
10	Fábio Silvestre (POR)	Trek Factory Racing	+ 0"

General classification after stage 2
Rank	Rider	Team	Time
1	Kris Boeckmans (BEL)	Lotto–Soudal	7h 53' 21"
2	Edward Theuns (BEL)	Topsport Vlaanderen–Baloise	+ 4"
3	Marco Coledan (ITA)	Trek Factory Racing	+ 6"
4	Cyril Gautier (FRA)	Team Europcar	+ 10"
5	Alexis Gougeard (FRA)	AG2R La Mondiale	+ 10"
6	Julien Duval (FRA)	Armée de Terre	+ 10"
7	Dennis Vanendert (BEL)	Lotto–Soudal	+ 10"
8	Pim Ligthart (NED)	Lotto–Soudal	+ 10"
9	Loïc Chetout (FRA)	Cofidis	+ 10"
10	Evaldas Šiškevičius (LTU)	Team Marseille 13 KTM	+ 10"

=== Stage 3 ===
6 February 2015 — Bessèges to Bessèges, 152.6 km (94.8 mi)

Stage 3 result
Rank	Rider	Team	Time
1	Bryan Coquard (FRA)	Team Europcar	3h 48' 06"
2	Giacomo Nizzolo (ITA)	Trek Factory Racing	+ 0"
3	Edward Theuns (BEL)	Topsport Vlaanderen–Baloise	+ 0"
4	Pim Ligthart (NED)	Lotto–Soudal	+ 0"
5	Marc Sarreau (FRA)	FDJ	+ 0"
6	Anthony Maldonado (FRA)	Auber 93	+ 0"
7	Edwin Ávila (COL)	Colombia	+ 0"
8	Justin Jules (FRA)	Veranclassic–Ekoi	+ 0"
9	Julien Duval (FRA)	Armée de Terre	+ 0"
10	Dylan Groenewegen (NED)	Team Roompot	+ 0"

General classification after stage 3
Rank	Rider	Team	Time
1	Edward Theuns (BEL)	Topsport Vlaanderen–Baloise	11h 41' 24"
2	Kris Boeckmans (BEL)	Lotto–Soudal	+ 3"
3	Marco Coledan (ITA)	Trek Factory Racing	+ 9"
4	Cyril Gautier (FRA)	Team Europcar	+ 11"
5	Alexis Gougeard (FRA)	AG2R La Mondiale	+ 13"
6	Julien Duval (FRA)	Armée de Terre	+ 13"
7	Pim Ligthart (NED)	Lotto–Soudal	+ 13"
8	Loïc Chetout (FRA)	Cofidis	+ 13"
9	Eliot Lietaer (BEL)	Topsport Vlaanderen–Baloise	+ 13"
10	Brian van Goethem (NED)	Team Roompot	+ 13"

=== Stage 4 ===
7 February 2015 — L'Ardoise to Laudun, 147.1 km (91.4 mi)

Stage 4 result
Rank	Rider	Team	Time
1	Tony Gallopin (FRA)	Lotto–Soudal	3h 43' 51"
2	Christophe Laporte (FRA)	Cofidis	+ 0"
3	Edward Theuns (BEL)	Topsport Vlaanderen–Baloise	+ 0"
4	Fabio Felline (ITA)	Trek Factory Racing	+ 0"
5	Roy Jans (BEL)	Wanty–Groupe Gobert	+ 0"
6	Pim Ligthart (NED)	Lotto–Soudal	+ 0"
7	Baptiste Planckaert (BEL)	Roubaix–Lille Métropole	+ 0"
8	Armindo Fonseca (FRA)	Bretagne–Séché Environnement	+ 0"
9	Bob Jungels (LUX)	Trek Factory Racing	+ 0"
10	Marco Marcato (ITA)	Wanty–Groupe Gobert	+ 0"

General classification after stage 4
Rank	Rider	Team	Time
1	Edward Theuns (BEL)	Topsport Vlaanderen–Baloise	15h 25' 11"
2	Kris Boeckmans (BEL)	Lotto–Soudal	+ 7"
3	Marco Coledan (ITA)	Trek Factory Racing	+ 13"
4	Cyril Gautier (FRA)	Team Europcar	+ 15"
5	Julien Duval (FRA)	Armée de Terre	+ 17"
6	Pim Ligthart (NED)	Lotto–Soudal	+ 17"
7	Alexis Gougeard (FRA)	AG2R La Mondiale	+ 17"
8	Loïc Chetout (FRA)	Cofidis	+ 17"
9	Eliot Lietaer (BEL)	Topsport Vlaanderen–Baloise	+ 17"
10	Brian van Goethem (NED)	Team Roompot	+ 17"

=== Stage 5 ===
8 February 2015 — Alès to Alès, 11.92 km (7.4 mi), individual time trial (ITT)

Stage 5 result
Rank	Rider	Team	Time
1	Bob Jungels (LUX)	Trek Factory Racing	17' 40"
2	Tony Gallopin (FRA)	Lotto–Soudal	+ 19"
3	Fabio Felline (ITA)	Trek Factory Racing	+ 20"
4	Riccardo Zoidl (AUT)	Trek Factory Racing	+ 21"
5	Pierre Latour (FRA)	AG2R La Mondiale	+ 26"
6	Maxime Monfort (BEL)	Lotto–Soudal	+ 27"
7	Alexis Gougeard (FRA)	AG2R La Mondiale	+ 30"
8	Jonathan Hivert (FRA)	Bretagne–Séché Environnement	+ 32"
9	Kris Boeckmans (BEL)	Lotto–Soudal	+ 33"
10	Thibaut Pinot (FRA)	FDJ	+ 34"

Final general classification
Rank	Rider	Team	Time
1	Bob Jungels (LUX)	Trek Factory Racing	15h 43' 21"
2	Tony Gallopin (FRA)	Lotto–Soudal	+ 9"
3	Kris Boeckmans (BEL)	Lotto–Soudal	+ 10"
4	Alexis Gougeard (FRA)	AG2R La Mondiale	+ 17"
5	Edward Theuns (BEL)	Topsport Vlaanderen–Baloise	+ 20"
6	Cyril Gautier (FRA)	Team Europcar	+ 22"
7	Pierre Latour (FRA)	AG2R La Mondiale	+ 30"
8	Maxime Monfort (BEL)	Lotto–Soudal	+ 31"
9	Eliot Lietaer (BEL)	Topsport Vlaanderen–Baloise	+ 31"
10	Pim Ligthart (NED)	Lotto–Soudal	+ 35"

== Classification leadership table ==
In the 2015 Étoile de Bessèges, four different jerseys were awarded. For the general classification, calculated by adding each cyclist's finishing times on each stage, and allowing time bonuses for the first three finishers at intermediate sprints and at the finish of mass-start stages, the leader received an orange jersey. This classification was considered the most important of the 2015 Étoile de Bessèges, and the winner of the classification was considered the winner of the race.

Additionally, there was a points classification, which awarded a yellow jersey. In the points classification, cyclists received points for finishing in the top 15 in a mass-start stage. For winning a stage, a rider earned 25 points, with 20 for second, 16 for third, 13 for fourth, 11 for fifth with a point fewer per place down to a single point for 15th place. Points towards the classification could also be accrued at intermediate sprint points during each stage; these intermediate sprints also offered bonus seconds towards the general classification. There was also a mountains classification, the leadership of which was marked by a blue jersey. In the mountains classification, points were won by reaching the top of a climb before other cyclists, with more points available for the higher-categorised climbs.

The fourth jersey represented the young rider classification, marked by a white jersey. This was decided in the same way as the general classification, but only riders born after 1 January 1992 were eligible to be ranked in the classification. There was also a classification for teams, in which the times of the best three cyclists per team on each stage were added together; the leading team at the end of the race was the team with the lowest total time.

Stage	Winner	General classification	Points classification	Mountain classification	Young rider classification	Team classification
1	Kris Boeckmans	Kris Boeckmans	Kris Boeckmans	Julien Loubet	Alexis Gougeard	Lotto–Soudal
2	Roy Jans	Kris Boeckmans	Marco Coledan	Julien Loubet	Alexis Gougeard	Lotto–Soudal
3	Bryan Coquard	Edward Theuns	Edward Theuns	Julien Loubet	Alexis Gougeard	Lotto–Soudal
4	Tony Gallopin	Edward Theuns	Edward Theuns	Julien Loubet	Alexis Gougeard	Lotto–Soudal
5	Bob Jungels	Bob Jungels	Edward Theuns	Julien Loubet	Alexis Gougeard	Trek Factory Racing
Final		Bob Jungels	Edward Theuns	Julien Loubet	Alexis Gougeard	Trek Factory Racing

== Final results ==
=== General classification ===
Final general classification
Rank	Rider	Team	Time
1	Bob Jungels (LUX)	Trek Factory Racing	15h 43' 21"
2	Tony Gallopin (FRA)	Lotto–Soudal	+ 9"
3	Kris Boeckmans (BEL)	Lotto–Soudal	+ 10"
4	Alexis Gougeard (FRA)	AG2R La Mondiale	+ 17"
5	Edward Theuns (BEL)	Topsport Vlaanderen–Baloise	+ 20"
6	Cyril Gautier (FRA)	Team Europcar	+ 22"
7	Pierre Latour (FRA)	AG2R La Mondiale	+ 30"
8	Maxime Monfort (BEL)	Lotto–Soudal	+ 31"
9	Eliot Lietaer (BEL)	Topsport Vlaanderen–Baloise	+ 31"
10	Pim Ligthart (NED)	Lotto–Soudal	+ 35"
