= Château de Rousson =

Castle in Gard, Occitania, France

Coordinates: 44°11′6″N 4°8′12″E

The Château de Rousson is a castle in the commune of Rousson in the Gard département of France.

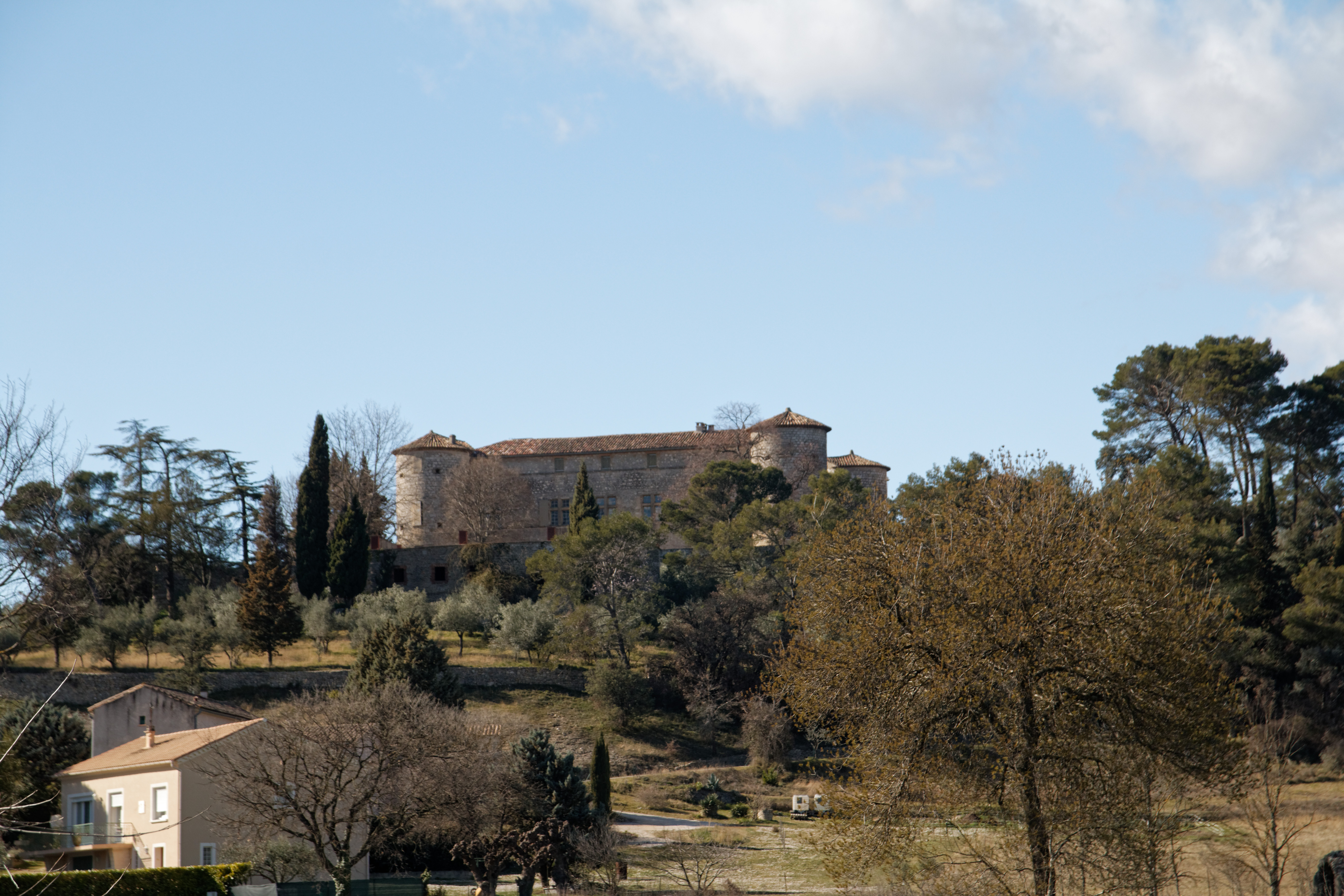
View of Château de Rousson

== History ==
The fief of Rousson was bought by Jacques d'Agulhac de Beaumefort in 1588. He built the castle between 1600 and 1615. The castle, protected by four corner towers, has barely been modified since its original construction.

It was purchased by the Bary family in 1910 and, although they undertook its restoration, they made only minor alterations to some windows and extended the north west wing into the central courtyard

== Description ==
The principal facade faces south east and features a series of mullioned windows. Inside, many old tiled floors are well-preserved. On the ground floor, the kitchen features a large fireplace and bread oven. The first floor gallery contains an old sea chest. From the castle terrace, there are extensive views of the Aigoual and Ventoux ranges.

It has been listed since 1972 as a monument historique by the French Ministry of Culture. The castle is privately owned and open to visitors only for groups under reservation.

== See also ==
- List of castles in France
