= Clément Carisey =

French cyclist

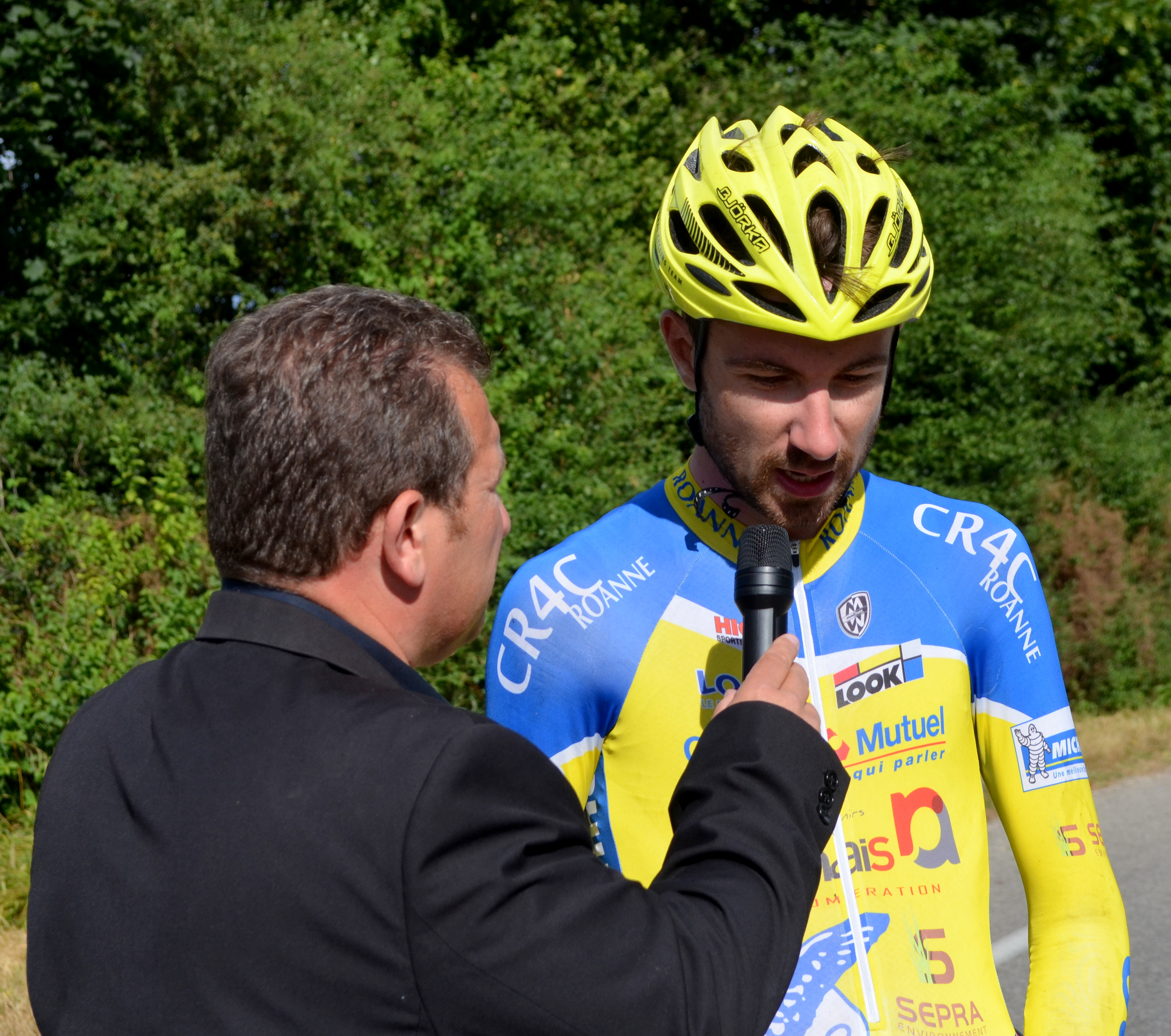
- Carisey in 2016

Personal information
- Born: 23 March 1992 (age 34) Échirolles, France
- Height: 1.86 m (6 ft 1 in)
- Weight: 75 kg (165 lb)

Cycling career
- Sport: Cycling
- Current team: Charvieu Chavagneux Isère Cyclisme
- Discipline: Road
- Role: Rider
- Rider type: Puncheur

Amateur teams
- 2011: ES Saint-Martin–d'Hères
- 2012–2015: VC Caladois
- 2016–2017: CR4C Roanne
- 2018: Pro Immo Nicolas Roux
- 2020: Pro Immo Nicolas Roux
- 2023–: Charvieu Chavagneux Isère Cyclisme

Professional teams
- 2018: Israel Cycling Academy (stagiaire)
- 2019: Israel Cycling Academy
- 2021: Delko
- 2022: Go Sport–Roubaix–Lille Métropole

Clément Carisey (born 22 March 1992) is a French cyclist, who currently rides for French amateur team Charvieu Chavagneux Isère Cyclisme.

== Major results ==
2018
10th Grand Prix de la Ville de Nogent-sur-Oise
2019
7th Overall Circuit Cycliste Sarthe
7th Rund um Köln
10th Tour of Estonia
2021
1st Stage 5 Tour Poitou-Charentes en Nouvelle-Aquitaine
9th Overall Étoile de Bessèges
2022
5th Overall Ronde de l'Oise
2023
1st Trophée Souvenir Roger Walkowiak - Ville de Cusset
2nd Grand Prix de Vougy
3rd Annemasse-Bellegarde et retour
5th Le Poinçonnet-Panazol Limoges Métropole
5th Grand Prix de Saint-Étienne Loire
5th Maggioni Classique Châtillon-Dijon
6th Tour du Charollais
