= 2018 Tro-Bro Léon =

Cycling race

2018 UCI Europe Tour

Race details
- Dates: 15 April 2018
- Stages: 1
- Distance: 203.2 km (126.3 mi)
- Winning time: 5h 12' 07"

Results
	Winner	Christophe Laporte (FRA)	(Cofidis)
	Second	Damien Gaudin (FRA)	(Direct Énergie)
	Third	Jelle Mannaerts (BEL)	(Tarteletto–Isorex)

The 2018 Tro-Bro Léon was a one-day road cycling race that took place on 15 April 2018. It was the 35th edition of the Tro-Bro Léon and was rated as a 1.1 event as part of the 2018 UCI Europe Tour. It was also the eighth event of the 2018 French Road Cycling Cup.

The race was won by Christophe Laporte (Cofidis).

== Teams ==
Nineteen teams were invited to take part in the race. These included two UCI WorldTeams, eleven UCI Professional Continental teams and six UCI Continental teams.

UCI WorldTeams

- AG2R La Mondiale
- Groupama–FDJ

UCI Professional Continental Teams

- Cofidis
- Delko–Marseille Provence KTM
- Direct Énergie
- Vital Concept
- Fortuneo–Samsic
- Israel Cycling Academy
- Euskadi–Murias
- Vérandas Willems–Crelan
- Wanty–Groupe Gobert
- UnitedHealthcare
- Sport Vlaanderen–Baloise

UCI Continental Teams

- Cibel–Cebon
- Euskadi–Murias
- St. Michel–Auber93
- Tarteletto–Isorex
- Joker Icopal
- Roubaix–Lille Métropole

== Result ==
Result
Rank	Rider	Team	Time
1	Christophe Laporte (FRA)	Cofidis	5h 12' 07"
2	Damien Gaudin (FRA)	Direct Énergie	+ 4"
3	Jelle Mannaerts (BEL)	Tarteletto–Isorex	+ 16"
4	Hugo Hofstetter (FRA)	Cofidis	+ 16"
5	Rasmus Tiller (NOR)	Joker Icopal	+ 16"
6	Olivier Le Gac (FRA)	Groupama–FDJ	+ 16"
7	Mikel Aristi (ESP)	Euskadi–Murias	+ 16"
8	Jonas Rickaert (BEL)	Sport Vlaanderen–Baloise	+ 16"
9	Mauro Finetto (ITA)	Delko–Marseille Provence KTM	+ 16"
10	Stijn Vandenbergh (FRA)	AG2R La Mondiale	+ 16"
