= 2018 Étoile de Bessèges =

UCI Europe Tour

Race details
- Dates: 31 January – 4 February 2018
- Stages: 5
- Distance: 621.54 km (386.2 mi)
- Winning time: 15h 03' 19"

Results
Jersey awarded to the overall winner	Winner	Tony Gallopin (France)	(AG2R La Mondiale)
	Second	Christophe Laporte (France)	(Cofidis)
	Third	Yoann Paillot (France)	(St. Michel–Auber93)
Jersey awarded to the points classification winner	Points	Marc Sarreau (France)	(Groupama–FDJ)
Jersey awarded to the mountains classification winner	Mountains	Rémy Di Gregorio (France)	(Delko–Marseille Provence KTM)
Jersey awarded to the youth classification winner	Youth	Benjamin Thomas (France)	(Groupama–FDJ)

The 2018 Étoile de Bessèges (transl. Star of Bessèges) was a road cycling stage race that took place between 31 January and 4 February 2018. The race was rated as a 2.1 event as part of the 2018 UCI Europe Tour, and was the 48th edition of the Étoile de Bessèges cycling race. The race included five stages; the first four were road stages while the fifth and final stage was a 10.7-kilometre (6.6 mi) individual time trial.

== Teams ==
Eighteen teams were invited to start the race. These included two UCI WorldTeams, twelve UCI Professional Continental teams and four UCI Continental teams.

UCI WorldTeams

- AG2R La Mondiale
- Groupama–FDJ

UCI Professional Continental teams

- Bardiani–CSF
- Caja Rural–Seguros RGA
- Cofidis
- Delko–Marseille Provence KTM
- Direct Énergie
- Fortuneo–Samsic
- Sport Vlaanderen–Baloise
- Vital Concept
- Vérandas Willems–Crelan
- WB Aqua Protect Veranclassic
- Wanty–Groupe Gobert
- Euskadi–Murias

UCI Continental teams

- Amore & Vita–Prodir
- Cibel–Cebon
- St. Michel–Auber93
- Roubaix–Lille Métropole

== Route ==
Stage schedule
Stage	Date	Route	Distance	Type	Winner
1	1 February	Bellegarde to Beaucaire	157 km (98 mi)	Hilly stage	Marc Sarreau (FRA)
2	2 February	Nîmes to Générac	148.3 km (92 mi)	Hilly stage	Christophe Laporte (FRA)
3	3 February	Bessèges to Bessèges	152.6 km (95 mi)	Hilly stage	Marc Sarreau (FRA)
4	4 February	Chusclan to Laudun-l'Ardoise	152.9 km (95 mi)	Hilly stage	Sean De Bie (BEL)
5	5 February	Alès to Alès	10.7 km (7 mi)	Individual time trial	Tony Gallopin (FRA)

== Stages ==
=== Stage 1 ===
31 January 2018 — Bellegarde to Beaucaire, 157 km (98 mi)

Result of Stage 1
Rank	Rider	Team	Time
1	Marc Sarreau (FRA)	Groupama–FDJ	3h 46' 10"
2	Thomas Boudat (FRA)	Direct Énergie	+ 0"
3	Bryan Coquard (FRA)	Vital Concept	+ 0"
4	Christophe Laporte (FRA)	Cofidis	+ 0"
5	Sean De Bie (BEL)	Vérandas Willems–Crelan	+ 0"
6	Amaury Capiot (BEL)	Sport Vlaanderen–Baloise	+ 0"
7	Enrico Barbin (ITA)	Bardiani–CSF	+ 0"
8	Jordi Warlop (BEL)	Sport Vlaanderen–Baloise	+ 0"
9	Kenny Dehaes (BEL)	WB Aqua Protect Veranclassic	+ 0"
10	Romain Feillu (FRA)	St. Michel–Auber93	+ 0"

General classification after Stage 1
Rank	Rider	Team	Time
1	Marc Sarreau (FRA)	Groupama–FDJ	3h 46' 10"
2	Thomas Boudat (FRA)	Direct Énergie	+ 4"
3	Bryan Coquard (FRA)	Vital Concept	+ 6"
4	Milan Menten (BEL)	Sport Vlaanderen–Baloise	+ 7"
5	Michiel Dieleman (BEL)	Cibel–Cebon	+ 8"
6	Aritz Bagües (ESP)	Euskadi-Murias	+ 9"
7	Christophe Laporte (FRA)	Cofidis	+ 10"
8	Sean De Bie (BEL)	Vérandas Willems–Crelan	+ 10"
9	Amaury Capiot (BEL)	Sport Vlaanderen–Baloise	+ 10"
10	Enrico Barbin (ITA)	Bardiani–CSF	+ 10"

=== Stage 2 ===
1 February 2018 — Nîmes to Générac, 148.3 km (92 mi)

Result of Stage 2
Rank	Rider	Team	Time
1	Christophe Laporte (FRA)	Cofidis	3h 22' 05"
2	Bryan Coquard (FRA)	Vital Concept	+ 0"
3	Timothy Dupont (BEL)	Wanty–Groupe Gobert	+ 0"
4	Amaury Capiot (BEL)	Sport Vlaanderen–Baloise	+ 0"
5	Emiel Vermeulen (BEL)	Roubaix–Lille Métropole	+ 0"
6	Marc Sarreau (FRA)	Groupama–FDJ	+ 0"
7	Lorrenzo Manzin (FRA)	Vital Concept	+ 0"
8	Romain Feillu (FRA)	St. Michel–Auber93	+ 0"
9	Kevyn Ista (BEL)	WB Aqua Protect Veranclassic	+ 0"
10	Marco Maronese (ITA)	Bardiani–CSF	+ 0"

General classification after Stage 2
Rank	Rider	Team	Time
1	Christophe Laporte (FRA)	Cofidis	7h 08' 05"
2	Bryan Coquard (FRA)	Vital Concept	+ 0"
3	Marc Sarreau (FRA)	Groupama–FDJ	+ 0"
4	Thomas Boudat (FRA)	Direct Énergie	+ 4"
5	Timothy Dupont (BEL)	Wanty–Groupe Gobert	+ 6"
6	Milan Menten (BEL)	Sport Vlaanderen–Baloise	+ 7"
7	Pierre Idjouadiene (FRA)	Roubaix–Lille Métropole	+ 7"
8	Dries Van Gestel (BEL)	Sport Vlaanderen–Baloise	+ 8"
9	Michiel Dieleman (BEL)	Cibel–Cebon	+ 8"
10	Romain Combaud (FRA)	Delko–Marseille Provence KTM	+ 9"

=== Stage 3 ===
2 February 2018 — Bessèges to Bessèges, 152.6 km (95 mi)

Result of Stage 3
Rank	Rider	Team	Time
1	Marc Sarreau (FRA)	Groupama–FDJ	3h 56' 29"
2	Thomas Boudat (FRA)	Direct Énergie	+ 0"
3	Samuel Dumoulin (FRA)	AG2R La Mondiale	+ 0"
4	Sean De Bie (BEL)	Vérandas Willems–Crelan	+ 0"
5	Timothy Dupont (BEL)	Wanty–Groupe Gobert	+ 0"
6	Brenton Jones (AUS)	Delko–Marseille Provence KTM	+ 0"
7	Christophe Laporte (FRA)	Cofidis	+ 0"
8	Amaury Capiot (BEL)	Sport Vlaanderen–Baloise	+ 0"
9	Damien Touzé (FRA)	St. Michel–Auber93	+ 0"
10	Laurent Pichon (FRA)	Fortuneo–Samsic	+ 0"

General classification after Stage 3
Rank	Rider	Team	Time
1	Marc Sarreau (FRA)	Groupama–FDJ	11h 04' 24"
2	Thomas Boudat (FRA)	Direct Énergie	+ 8"
3	Christophe Laporte (FRA)	Cofidis	+ 10"
4	Bryan Coquard (FRA)	Vital Concept	+ 10"
5	Benoît Cosnefroy (FRA)	AG2R La Mondiale	+ 14"
6	Samuel Dumoulin (FRA)	AG2R La Mondiale	+ 16"
7	Timothy Dupont (BEL)	Wanty–Groupe Gobert	+ 16"
8	Romain Combaud (FRA)	Delko–Marseille Provence KTM	+ 16"
9	Milan Menten (BEL)	Sport Vlaanderen–Baloise	+ 17"
10	Dries Van Gestel (BEL)	Sport Vlaanderen–Baloise	+ 17"

=== Stage 4 ===
3 February 2018 — Chusclan to Laudun-l'Ardoise, 152.9 km (95 mi)

Result of Stage 4
Rank	Rider	Team	Time
1	Sean De Bie (BEL)	Vérandas Willems–Crelan	3h 43' 14"
2	Timothy Dupont (BEL)	Wanty–Groupe Gobert	+ 0"
3	Rudy Barbier (FRA)	AG2R La Mondiale	+ 0"
4	Pierre Barbier (FRA)	Roubaix–Lille Métropole	+ 0"
5	Damien Touzé (FRA)	St. Michel–Auber93	+ 0"
6	Anthony Turgis (FRA)	Cofidis	+ 0"
7	Bryan Coquard (FRA)	Vital Concept	+ 0"
8	Marc Sarreau (FRA)	Groupama–FDJ	+ 0"
9	Samuel Dumoulin (FRA)	AG2R La Mondiale	+ 0"
10	Amaury Capiot (BEL)	Sport Vlaanderen–Baloise	+ 0"

General classification after Stage 4
Rank	Rider	Team	Time
1	Marc Sarreau (FRA)	Groupama–FDJ	14h 47' 38"
2	Thomas Boudat (FRA)	Direct Énergie	+ 8"
3	Bryan Coquard (FRA)	Vital Concept	+ 10"
4	Christophe Laporte (FRA)	Cofidis	+ 10"
5	Sean De Bie (BEL)	Vérandas Willems–Crelan	+ 10"
6	Timothy Dupont (BEL)	Wanty–Groupe Gobert	+ 10"
7	Samuel Dumoulin (FRA)	AG2R La Mondiale	+ 16"
8	Milan Menten (BEL)	Sport Vlaanderen–Baloise	+ 17"
9	Dries Van Gestel (BEL)	Sport Vlaanderen–Baloise	+ 17"
10	Jonathan Hivert (FRA)	Direct Énergie	+ 17"

=== Stage 5 ===
4 February 2017 — Alès to Alès, 10.7 km (7 mi), individual time trial (ITT)

Result of Stage 5
Rank	Rider	Team	Time
1	Tony Gallopin (FRA)	AG2R La Mondiale	15' 21"
2	Yoann Paillot (FRA)	St. Michel–Auber93	+ 20"
3	Sylvain Chavanel (FRA)	Direct Énergie	+ 22"
4	Christophe Laporte (FRA)	Cofidis	+ 25"
5	Jonathan Hivert (FRA)	Direct Énergie	+ 29"
6	Lilian Calmejane (FRA)	Direct Énergie	+ 29"
7	Alexis Gougeard (FRA)	AG2R La Mondiale	+ 34"
8	Léo Vincent (FRA)	Groupama–FDJ	+ 39"
9	Johan Le Bon (FRA)	Vital Concept	+ 44"
10	Sean De Bie (BEL)	Vérandas Willems–Crelan	+ 45"

Final general classification
Rank	Rider	Team	Time
1	Tony Gallopin (FRA)	AG2R La Mondiale	15h 03' 19"
2	Christophe Laporte (FRA)	Cofidis	+ 15"
3	Yoann Paillot (FRA)	St. Michel–Auber93	+ 20"
4	Sylvain Chavanel (FRA)	Direct Énergie	+ 22"
5	Jonathan Hivert (FRA)	Direct Énergie	+ 26"
6	Lilian Calmejane (FRA)	Direct Énergie	+ 29"
7	Alexis Gougeard (FRA)	AG2R La Mondiale	+ 34"
8	Sean De Bie (BEL)	Vérandas Willems–Crelan	+ 35"
9	Marc Sarreau (FRA)	Groupama–FDJ	+ 35"
10	Johan Le Bon (FRA)	Vital Concept	+ 44"
