= Jardins ethnobotaniques de la Gardie =

Botanical gardens in Languedoc-Roussillon, France

Coordinates: 44°10′47″N 4°09′03″E

The Jardins ethnobotaniques de la Gardie ("Ethnobotanical gardens of La Gardie") are botanical gardens located near the Museum of Prehistorama, in the hamlet of Pont d'Avène, Rousson, Gard, Languedoc-Roussillon, France. They are open daily except Monday in July and August, and weekend afternoons in May, June, and September; an admission fee is charged.

The gardens are organized as a series of woodland clearings that illustrate the rural ethnobotany of the Basses Cévennes region, representing typical woodland management, family farming, and shepherding. Their principal features are orchards and cereals of the past; botanical, medieval, and herb gardens; beehives; dry stone walls; and a charcoal kiln. The gardens contain a range of local heirloom plants including more than 60 varieties of vines; 23 types of olive trees; fruits and berries including arbutus, elderberry, jujube, loquat, and mulberry; and vegetables from the Middle Ages including cabbage, chicory, leeks, lettuce, onions, spinach, turnips, and white beans.

== See also ==
- List of botanical gardens in France
