= 2025 Bredene Koksijde Classic =

2025 UCI ProSeries

Race details
- Dates: 21 March 2025
- Stages: 1
- Distance: 200.9 km (124.8 mi)
- Winning time: 4h 15' 50"

Results
	Winner	Edward Theuns (BEL)	(Lidl–Trek)
	Second	Luke Lamperti (USA)	(Soudal–Quick-Step)
	Third	Nils Eekhoff (NED)	(Team Picnic PostNL)

The 2025 Bredene Koksijde Classic was the 22nd edition of the Bredene Koksijde Classic road cycling one day race, which was held on 20 March 2025, starting and finishing in the titular towns of Bredene and Koksijde, respectively.

== Teams ==
Ten UCI WorldTeams, eleven UCI ProTeams, and two UCI Continental teams made up the twenty-three teams that participated in the race.

UCI WorldTeams

- Alpecin–Deceuninck
- Arkéa–B&B Hotels
- Cofidis
- Intermarché–Wanty
- Lidl–Trek
- Soudal–Quick-Step
- Team Picnic PostNL
- Team Jayco–AlUla
- UAE Team Emirates XRG
- XDS Astana Team

UCI ProTeams

- Euskaltel–Euskadi
- Israel–Premier Tech
- Lotto
- Q36.5 Pro Cycling Team
- Team Flanders–Baloise
- Team Novo Nordisk
- Team TotalEnergies
- Tudor Pro Cycling Team
- Uno-X Mobility
- VF Group–Bardiani–CSF–Faizanè
- Wagner Bazin WB

UCI Continental Teams

- Tarteletto–Isorex
- VolkerWessels Women's Pro Cycling Team

== Result ==
Result (1–10)
Rank	Rider	Team	Time
1	Edward Theuns (BEL)	Lidl–Trek	4h 15' 50"
2	Luke Lamperti (USA)	Soudal–Quick-Step	+ 0"
3	Nils Eekhoff (NED)	Team Picnic PostNL	+ 0"
4	Ethan Vernon (GBR)	Israel–Premier Tech	+ 0"
5	Vito Braet (BEL)	Intermarché–Wanty	+ 0"
6	Florian Vermeersch (BEL)	UAE Team Emirates XRG	+ 0"
7	Robbe Ghys (BEL)	Alpecin–Deceuninck	+ 0"
8	Stian Fredheim (NOR)	Uno-X Mobility	+ 0"
9	Milan Fretin (BEL)	Cofidis	+ 0"
10	Alessandro Romele (ITA)	XDS Astana Team	+ 0"
