= Edward Theuns =

Belgian cyclist (born 1991)

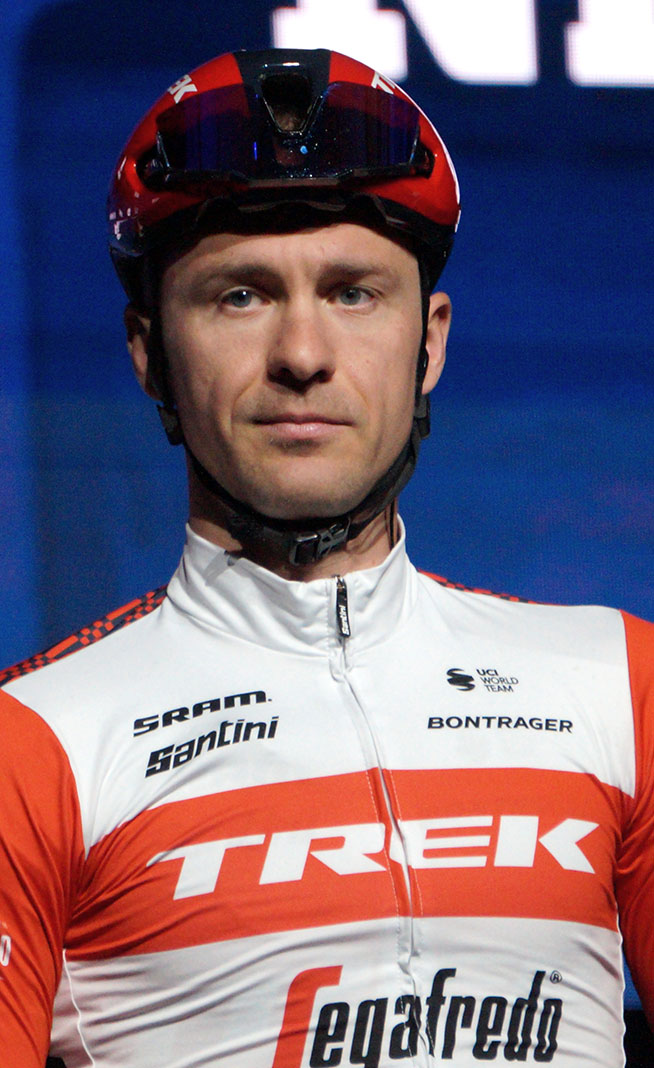
- Theuns in 2023

Personal information
- Born: 30 April 1991 (age 35) Ghent, Belgium
- Height: 1.83 m (6 ft 0 in)
- Weight: 72 kg (159 lb; 11 st 5 lb)

Cycling career
- Sport: Cycling
- Current team: Lidl–Trek
- Discipline: Road
- Role: Rider
- Rider type: Classics specialist

Amateur team
- 2010–2013: VL Technics–Abutriek

Professional teams
- 2014–2015: Topsport Vlaanderen–Baloise
- 2016–2017: Trek–Segafredo
- 2018: Team Sunweb
- 2019–: Trek–Segafredo

Major wins
- One-day races and Classics Primus Classic (2019) Bredene Koksijde Classic (2025)
Medal record
Men's road bicycle racing
Representing Belgium
European Championships
| Bronze medal – third place | 2024 Limburg | Mixed team relay |

Edward Theuns (born 30 April 1991) is a Belgian racing cyclist, who currently rides for UCI WorldTeam Lidl–Trek.

== Career ==
Theuns made his debut for Topsport Vlaanderen–Baloise in 2014. He took his first victory in August 2014 in the Grote Prijs Stad Zottegem. He also rode for his national team at the 2014 UCI Road World Championships. In 2015, he began his season with four top-ten finishes at the Étoile de Bessèges, finishing fifth overall and winning the points classification. He took his second career win in March 2015 with victory in the Ronde van Drenthe. In August 2015 it was announced that Theuns would join Trek–Segafredo for the 2016 season. He was named in the start list for the 2016 Tour de France and the 2017 Vuelta a España.

In 2018, Theuns signed with Team Sunweb, before returning to ride for Trek–Segafredo the following year. In 2019, he won the Primus Classic.

== Major results ==
2010
8th Overall Le Triptyque des Monts et Châteaux

1st Stage 4

2012
8th Paris–Tours Espoirs
2013
1st Stage 2a (ITT) Le Triptyque des Monts et Châteaux
1st Mountains classification, Giro della Regione Friuli Venezia Giulia
2nd Overall Tour du Piémont Vosgien
3rd Time trial, National Under-23 Road Championships
6th Liège–Bastogne–Liège Espoirs
7th GP Briek Schotte
8th Paris–Tours Espoirs
10th La Côte Picarde
2014 (1 pro win)
1st Grote Prijs Stad Zottegem
3rd Handzame Classic
4th Châteauroux Classic
7th Omloop van het Waasland
2015 (3)
1st Ronde van Drenthe
1st Stage 3 Tour de l'Eurométropole
2nd Dwars door Vlaanderen
2nd Scheldeprijs
2nd Rund um Köln
3rd Halle–Ingooigem
4th Dwars door Drenthe
4th Nationale Sluitingsprijs
5th Overall Étoile de Bessèges

1st Points classification

5th Overall Ster ZLM Toer
5th Clásica de Almería
5th Ronde van Zeeland Seaports
7th Overall Four Days of Dunkirk

1st Stage 5

7th Overall World Ports Classic
7th Grand Prix d'Ouverture La Marseillaise
8th Paris–Tours
8th Grand Prix de Fourmies
9th Schaal Sels
2016 (1)
1st Stage 1 Tour of Belgium
3rd Dwars door Vlaanderen
3rd Halle–Ingooigem
4th Scheldeprijs
8th Omloop Het Nieuwsblad
8th Kuurne–Brussels–Kuurne
Tour de France

Held after Stage 1

2017 (2)
Tour of Turkey

1st Points classification
1st Stage 6

1st Stage 4 BinckBank Tour
2nd Halle–Ingooigem
5th Down Under Classic
6th Road race, UEC European Road Championships
7th Overall Three Days of De Panne
8th Paris–Roubaix
2018
6th Omloop Het Nieuwsblad
2019 (1)
1st Primus Classic
6th Omloop van het Houtland
9th Kampioenschap van Vlaanderen
2020
5th Road race, National Road Championships
2021 (1)
1st Stage 5 Tour de Hongrie
2nd Road race, National Road Championships
8th Overall Étoile de Bessèges
8th Clásica de Almería
Combativity award Stage 2 Tour de France
2022
2nd Paris–Tours
3rd Grand Prix d'Isbergues
5th Scheldeprijs
6th Eschborn–Frankfurt
7th Paris–Bourges
2023
2nd Nokere Koerse
2nd Binche–Chimay–Binche
3rd Le Samyn
6th Scheldeprijs
9th Paris–Tours
10th Bredene Koksijde Classic
2024
9th Binche–Chimay–Binche
2025 (1)
1st Bredene Koksijde Classic
1st Stage 1 (TTT) Volta a la Comunitat Valenciana
2026
9th Overall ZLM Tour

=== Grand Tour general classification results timeline ===
| Grand Tour | 2016 | 2017 | 2018 | 2019 | 2020 | 2021 | 2022 | 2023 | 2024 |
|---|---|---|---|---|---|---|---|---|---|
| Giro d'Italia | — | — | — | — | — | — | 131 | — | 113 |
| Tour de France | DNF | — | 88 | — | 119 | 104 | — | — | |
| Vuelta a España | — | 91 | — | 133 | — | — | — | 128 | |

Legend
| — | Did not compete |
| DNF | Did not finish |
