= 2023 Gent–Wevelgem =

Belgian one-day cycling race

2023 UCI World Tour, race 12 of 35
- Event poster with previous winners Biniam Girmay and Elisa Balsamo

Race details
- Dates: 26 March 2023
- Stages: 1
- Distance: 260.9 km (162.1 mi)
- Winning time: 5h 49' 39"

Results
	Winner	Christophe Laporte (FRA)	(Team Jumbo–Visma)
	Second	Wout van Aert (BEL)	(Team Jumbo–Visma)
	Third	Sep Vanmarcke (BEL)	(Israel–Premier Tech)

The 2023 Gent–Wevelgem in Flanders Fields was a road cycling one-day race that took place on 26 March 2023 in the provinces of West Flanders and Hainaut in west Belgium between Ypres and Wevelgem. It was the 85th edition of Gent–Wevelgem and the 12th event of the 2023 UCI World Tour. The winner was Christophe Laporte of Team Jumbo–Visma.

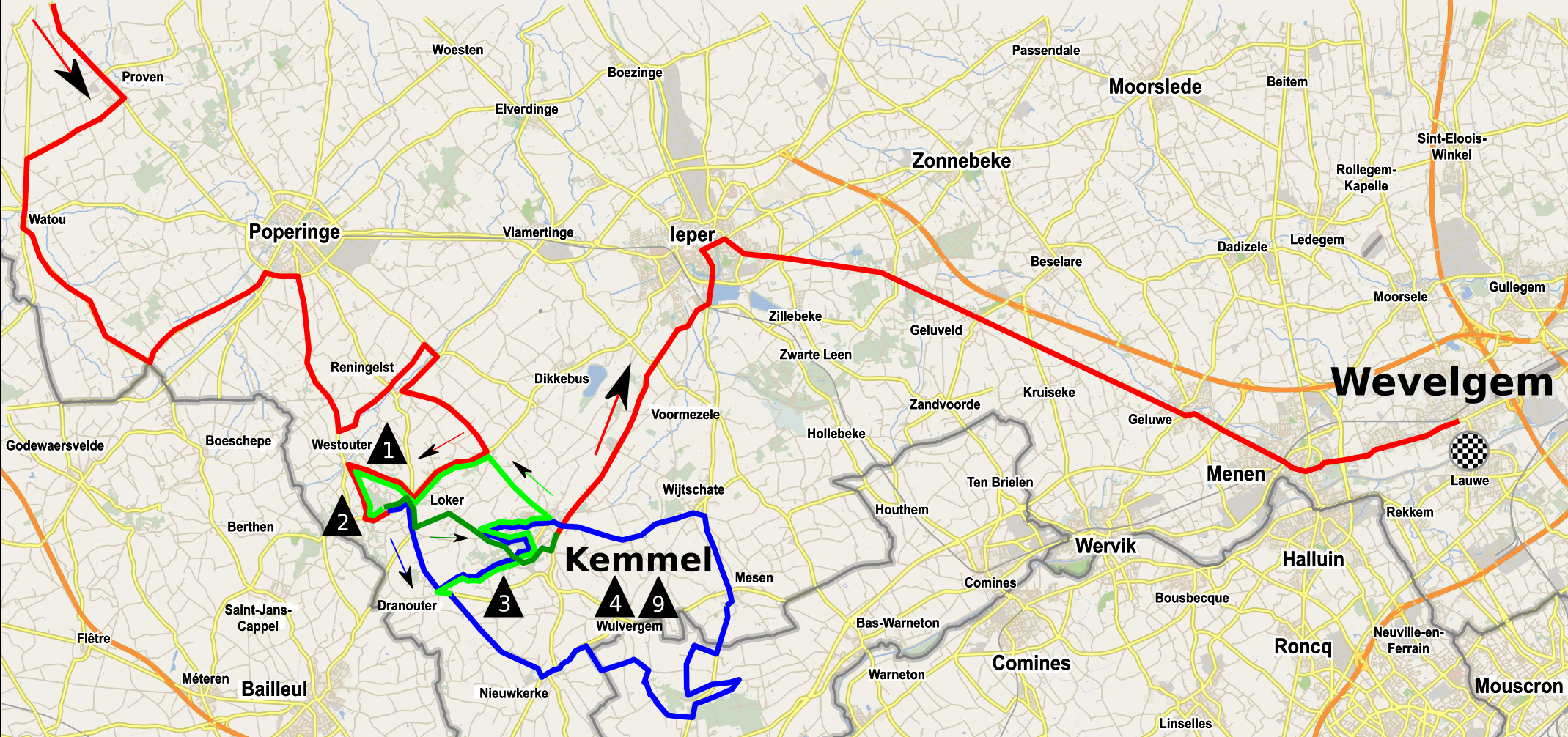
The route of the 2023 Gent–Wevelgem

== Teams ==
All 18 UCI WorldTeams and seven UCI ProTeams made up the 25 teams that participated in the race.

UCI WorldTeams

- AG2R Citroën Team
- Alpecin–Deceuninck
- Arkéa–Samsic
- Astana Qazaqstan Team
- Bora–Hansgrohe
- Cofidis
- EF Education–EasyPost
- Groupama–FDJ
- INEOS Grenadiers
- Intermarché–Circus–Wanty
- Movistar Team
- Soudal–Quick-Step
- Team Bahrain Victorious
- Team DSM
- Team Jayco–AlUla
- Team Jumbo–Visma
- Trek–Segafredo
- UAE Team Emirates

UCI ProTeams

- Bingoal WB
- Human Powered Health
- Israel–Premier Tech
- Lotto–Dstny
- Team Flanders–Baloise
- Team TotalEnergies
- Uno-X Pro Cycling Team

== Result ==
Result (1–10)
Rank	Rider	Team	Time
1	Christophe Laporte (FRA)	Team Jumbo–Visma	5h 49' 39"
2	Wout van Aert (BEL)	Team Jumbo–Visma	+ 0"
3	Sep Vanmarcke (BEL)	Israel–Premier Tech	+ 1' 56"
4	Frederik Frison (BEL)	Lotto–Dstny	+ 1' 56"
5	Mads Pedersen (DEN)	Trek–Segafredo	+ 1' 56"
6	Mikkel Bjerg (DEN)	UAE Team Emirates	+ 1' 56"
7	Alexis Renard (FRA)	Cofidis	+ 2' 04"
8	Olav Kooij (NED)	Team Jumbo–Visma	+ 2' 04"
9	Danny van Poppel (NED)	Bora–Hansgrohe	+ 2' 04"
10	Daniel McLay (GBR)	Arkéa–Samsic	+ 2' 04"
