= Alexis Gougeard =

French cyclist (born 1993)

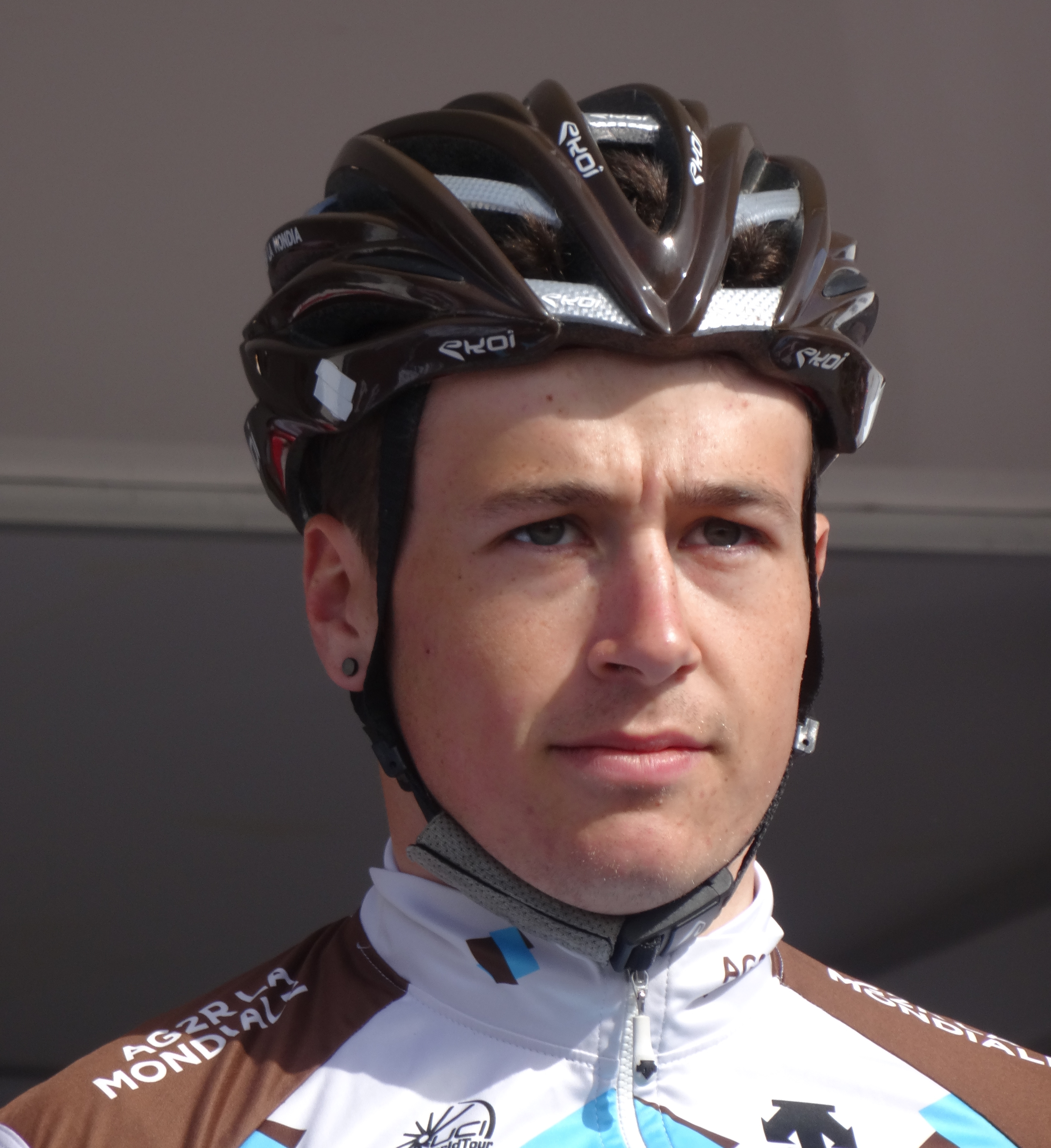
- Gougeard at the 2014 Grand Prix de Denain

Personal information
- Full name: Alexis Gougeard
- Born: 5 March 1993 (age 33) Rouen, France
- Height: 1.76 m (5 ft 9 1/2 in)
- Weight: 70 kg (154 lb; 11 st 0 lb)

Cycling career
- Sport: Cycling
- Disciplines: Road; Track
- Role: Rider
- Rider type: Rouleur

Amateur teams
- 2011: USSA Junior Pavilly Barentin
- 2012–2013: USSA Pavilly Barentin
- 2023: VC Rouen 76

Professional teams
- 2012: Véranda Rideau–Super U (stagiaire)
- 2014–2021: Ag2r–La Mondiale
- 2022: B&B Hotels–KTM
- 2024: Cofidis

Major wins
- Grand Tours Vuelta a España 1 individual stages (2015)

Alexis Gougeard (born 5 March 1993) is a French cyclist, who last rode for UCI WorldTeam Cofidis.

He specializes in time trials and track cycling. He became professional in 2014, as a member of the Ag2r–La Mondiale team. He was named in the start list for the 2015 Vuelta a España, where he took his first grand tour stage win on the nineteenth stage, making a winning attack from a breakaway group.

== Major results ==
2011
1st Time trial, National Junior Road Championships
1st Overall Grand Prix Rüebliland

1st Stage 1

2nd Time trial, UEC European Junior Road Championships
2nd Paris–Roubaix Juniors
2012
2nd Road race, National Under-23 Road Championships
3rd Overall Kreiz Breizh Elites
2013
1st Prologue Tour de l'Avenir
2nd Overall Coupe des nations Ville Saguenay

1st Stage 1

3rd Time trial, National Under-23 Road Championships
5th Time trial, Mediterranean Games
7th Time trial, UEC European Under-23 Road Championships
10th ZLM Tour
2014
1st Classic Loire Atlantique
1st Boucles de l'Aulne
2015
1st Overall Tour de l'Eurométropole

1st Young rider classification
1st Prologue

Vuelta a España

1st Stage 19
Combativity award Stage 19

1st Classic Loire Atlantique
1st Stage 3 Four Days of Dunkirk
4th Overall Étoile de Bessèges

1st Young rider classification

5th Overall Driedaagse van West-Vlaanderen
2016
5th Omloop Het Nieuwsblad
2017
1st Polynormande
1st Mountains classification, Tour de Wallonie
5th Time trial, National Road Championships
2018
4th Overall Four Days of Dunkirk
7th Overall Étoile de Bessèges
2019
1st Overall Circuit de la Sarthe

1st Stage 3

1st Boucles de l'Aulne
6th Overall Tour Poitou-Charentes en Nouvelle-Aquitaine
Combativity award Stage 16 Tour de France
2020
5th Overall Tour Poitou-Charentes en Nouvelle-Aquitaine
2021
9th Polynormande
2023
1st Grand Prix de Buxerolles
2024
7th Overall Tour de la Provence

=== Grand Tour general classification results timeline ===
Grand Tour	2015	2016	2017	2018	2019	2020	2021	2022
Giro d'Italia	—	—	—	—	—	—	114	—
Tour de France	—	147	—	—	115	—	—	89
Vuelta a España	112	—	99	DNF	—	—	—	—

Legend
—	Did not compete
DNF	Did not finish
IP	In progress
