= Christophe Laporte =

French bicycle racer (born 1992)

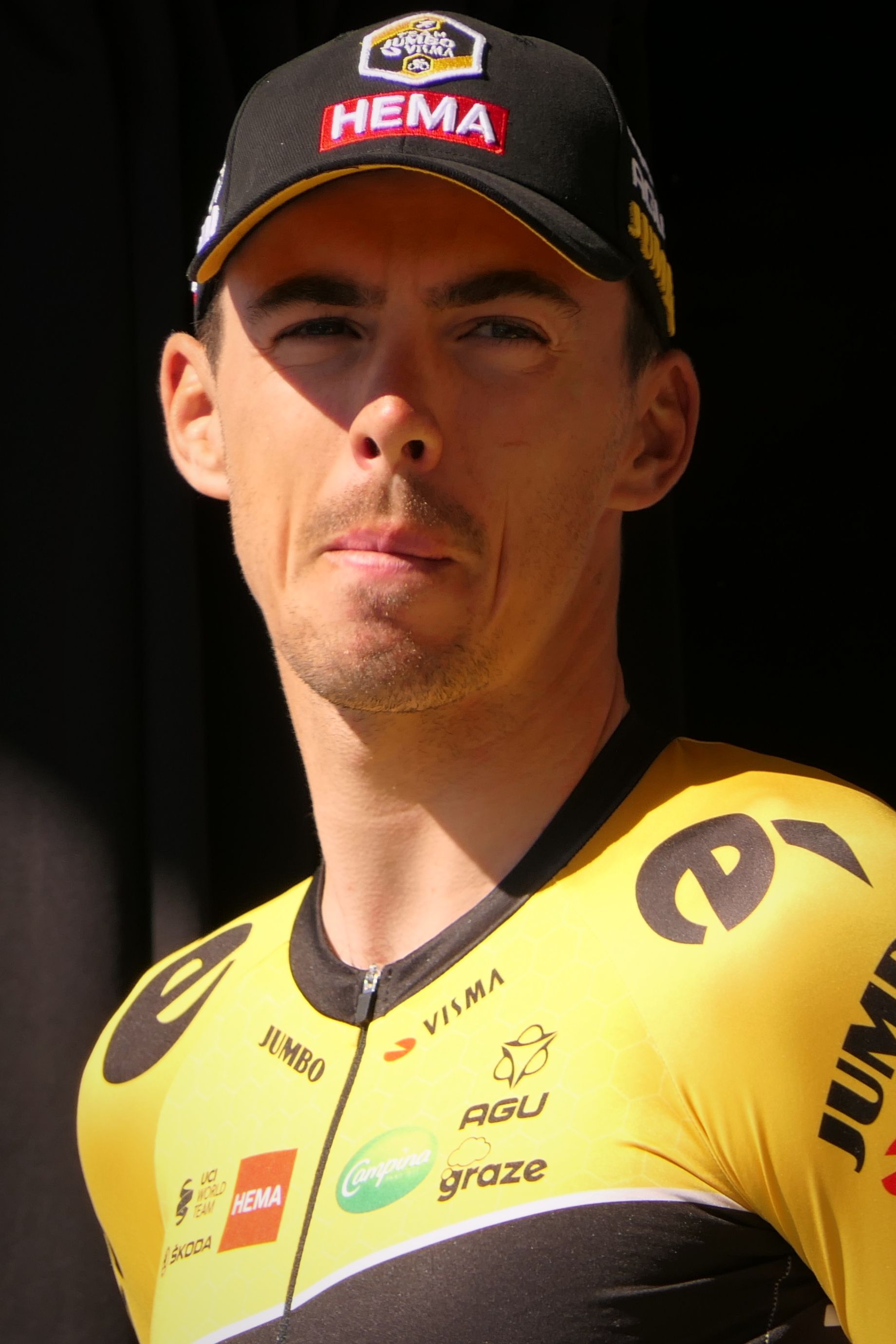
- Laporte at the 2022 Paris–Roubaix

Personal information
- Full name: Christophe Laporte
- Born: 11 December 1992 (age 33) La Seyne-sur-Mer, France
- Height: 1.91 m (6 ft 3 in)

Cycling career
- Sport: Cycling
- Current team: Visma–Lease a Bike
- Discipline: Road
- Role: Rider
- Rider type: Sprinter; Classics specialist

Amateur teams
- 2011: VS Hyérois
- 2012–2013: AVC Aix-en-Provence
- 2012: La Pomme Marseille (stagiaire)

Professional teams
- 2014–2021: Cofidis
- 2022–: Team Jumbo–Visma

Major wins
- Grand Tours Tour de France 1 individual stage (2022) Stage races Danmark Rundt (2022) One-day races and Classics European Road Race Championships (2023) Gent–Wevelgem (2023) Dwars door Vlaanderen (2023) Paris–Tours (2024) Tro-Bro Léon (2018) GP de Wallonie (2021)
Medal record
Men's road bicycle racing
Representing France
Olympic Games
Bronze medal – third place	2024 Paris	Road race
World Championships
Silver medal – second place	2022 Wollongong	Road race
European Championships
Gold medal – first place	2023 Drenthe	Road race

Christophe Laporte (French: [kɹɪˈstɔf ɫəˈpɔɹt]; born 11 December 1992) is a French professional cyclist who rides for UCI WorldTeam Visma–Lease a Bike. A sprinter and classics rider, Laporte has taken more than 30 victories during his professional career, including wins in 2023 at Gent–Wevelgem, Dwars door Vlaanderen and the road race at the UEC European Road Championships. He has also won a stage at the 2022 Tour de France, a silver medal in the road race at the 2022 UCI Road World Championships and a bronze medal in the road race at the 2024 Paris Olympics.

== Career ==
Born in La Seyne-sur-Mer, Laporte rode for the VS Hyérois and AVC Aix-en-Provence teams as an amateur. In 2012, he rode for UCI Continental team La Pomme Marseille as a stagiaire, and the following year, he won a silver medal in the road race at the Mediterranean Games.

=== Cofidis (2014–2021) ===
==== 2014–2017 ====
Laporte turned professional with the Cofidis team in 2014, with his best result in his first season with the team being a sixth-place finish at La Roue Tourangelle. The following year, and after third-place finishes at Le Samyn and the Grand Prix de Wallonie, Laporte took his first professional victory at October's Tour de Vendée, winning a bunch sprint in La Roche-sur-Yon. Laporte also made his first start at the Tour de France, with his best result being a seventh-place finish on stage fifteen.

At the 2016 Tour de France, Laporte was expected to support Nacer Bouhanni in the sprints, however Bouhanni was ruled out of the race due to an injury suffered in a hotel altercation prior to the French National Road Race Championships. Laporte went on to take six top-ten stage finishes at the race, with his best being fifth on two occasions. He was involved in an altercation with Asbjørn Kragh Andersen at the Tour du Poitou-Charentes, with both riders being penalised one minute in the general classification and fined 200 Swiss francs. The following year, he repeated his Tour de Vendée victory – this time with a solo attack, 6 kilometres (3.7 miles) from the finish in La Roche-sur-Yon.

==== 2018 ====
At the end of the 2017 season, Cédric Vasseur replaced Yvon Sanquer as Cofidis general manager, and with this management change, Laporte had a breakout 2018 season. In his first two starts of the season, Laporte won a stage and finished second overall at the Étoile de Bessèges, before winning two stages and the points classification at the Tour La Provence. He finished within the lead group, in fourth place, at Gent–Wevelgem, before taking his fourth win of the season at Tro-Bro Léon, attacking 6 kilometres (3.7 miles) from the finish in Lannilis. At May's Tour of Belgium, Laporte won the third stage – a 10.6-kilometre (6.6-mile) individual time trial – and assumed the overall race lead, before ceding it the next day.

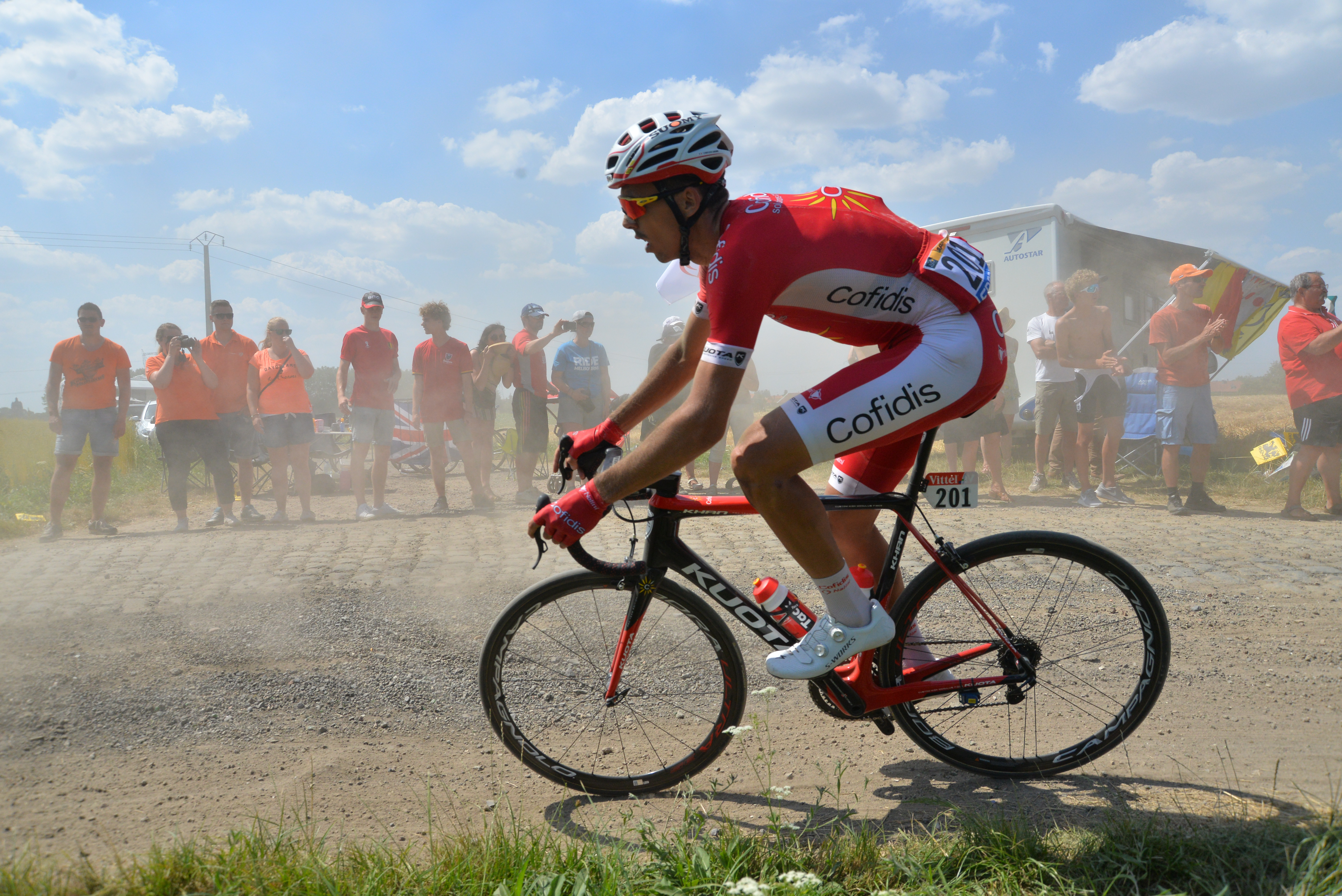
Laporte at the 2018 Tour de France

Laporte then won a stage at the Tour de Luxembourg the following week, and as a result, he was chosen as the main sprinter for Cofidis for the Tour de France, ahead of Nacer Bouhanni. His best result at the race was a runner-up finish to Arnaud Démare on stage 18 in Pau. He was selected for the French team to ride at the UEC European Championships in Glasgow, but failed to finish the race. His best results over the remainder of the season were second place at the Grand Prix d'Isbergues in September, and third place at Paris–Bourges in October.

==== 2019–2021 ====
Laporte started the 2019 season with the overall victory at the Étoile de Bessèges, along with two stage victories and the points classification. After a lean spring which saw no further victories, Laporte's next victories came at June's Tour de Luxembourg, when he won the opening prologue and stage one. He held the race lead for a further day before withdrawing from the race on the penultimate day due to illness. Having withdrawn from the Tour de France prior to the first rest day, on stage eight, Laporte took his second general classification win of the year at the Tour Poitou-Charentes en Nouvelle-Aquitaine, where he also won three stages. Towards the end of the season, Laporte recorded second-place finishes at the Duo Normand two-man team time trial event – with Anthony Perez – and the Tour de Vendée, as well as a third-place finish at the Grand Prix d'Isbergues. With the 2020 season largely effected by the COVID-19 pandemic, Laporte went winless, as his best finish of the year was a fourth-place stage finish on stage seven at the Tour de France.

Laporte started the 2021 season with a block of racing in France, which included a stage win and the points classification at the Étoile de Bessèges. He finished second at Dwars door Vlaanderen, leading home the peloton behind solo winner Dylan van Baarle, and it was not until May and the Circuit de Wallonie for Laporte to take his second win of the season. He was designated as the main sprinter for Cofidis at the Tour de France, however his best stage result at the race came on stage 19 – second behind Matej Mohorič – when he featured as part of the breakaway. Following the Tour de France, Laporte won the opening stage of August's Tour du Limousin and the Grand Prix de Wallonie one-day race in September, before taking his first top-ten finish at one of the cycling monuments with sixth at Paris–Roubaix in October.

=== Team Jumbo–Visma (2022–present) ===
After eight years with Cofidis, Laporte signed an initial two-year contract to join Team Jumbo–Visma from the 2022 season.

==== 2022 ====
Having taken an eighth-place finish in his first start at Kuurne–Brussels–Kuurne, Laporte took his first victory for the team – and his first win at UCI World Tour level – on the opening stage of Paris–Nice; Laporte capitalised on the tempo set by teammate Nathan Van Hooydonck on the Côte de Breuil-Bois-Robert, bringing Wout van Aert and Primož Roglič with him and the Team Jumbo–Visma trio worked together to hold off the peloton on the final 6 kilometres (3.7 miles) into Mantes-la-Ville. At the E3 Saxo Bank Classic, Laporte and Van Aert again found themselves in an attacking move, having dropped their rivals on the Paterberg with around 40 kilometres (25 miles) left; they remained clear into Harelbeke, with Van Aert ultimately winning in the driekleur trikot. Two days later, Laporte forced the decisive move at Gent–Wevelgem, attacking with 24 kilometres (15 miles) remaining with three other riders; the quartet stayed clear at the front, where Laporte was outsprinted to the finish line by Biniam Girmay. With Van Aert testing positive for COVID-19 prior to the Tour of Flanders, Laporte was one of the team's joint-leaders along with Tiesj Benoot, and ultimately finished in ninth place.

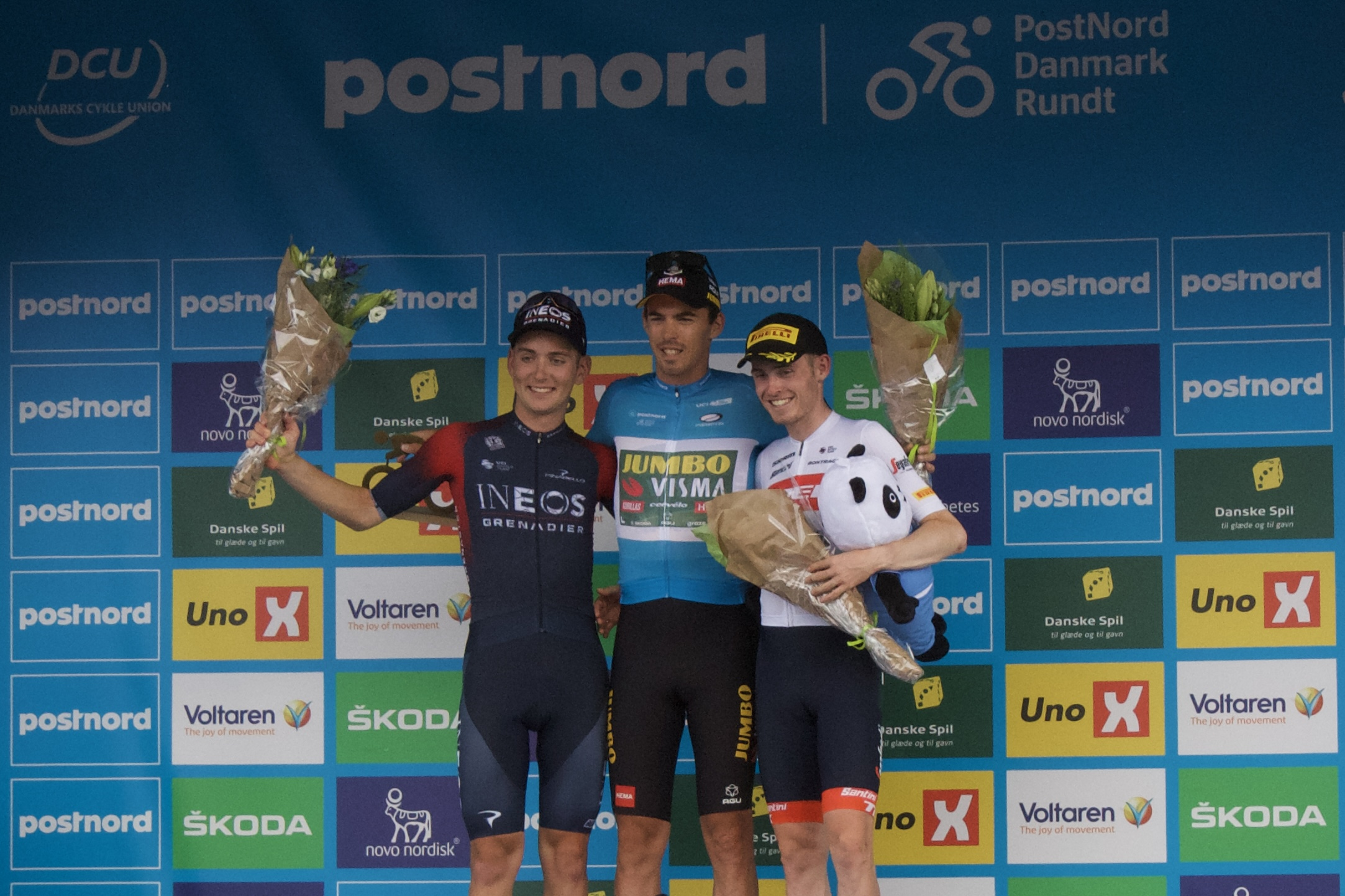
Laporte (centre) won the 2022 Danmark Rundt on the final day, ahead of Magnus Sheffield (left) and Mattias Skjelmose (right)

At the Tour de France, Laporte was a key part of Van Aert's sprint lead-outs that would ultimately result in Van Aert taking the points classification at the race. Having taken a third-place stage finish on stage four, Laporte also spent stages ten and eleven in breakaways and was involved in some of the pace-making on the latter, that resulted in teammate Jonas Vingegaard definitively taking the yellow jersey. Laporte would ultimately take a stage victory, on stage 19, jumping across to the breakaway in the closing kilometres and pushed on during the uphill sprint in Cahors, beating Jasper Philipsen to the line. He then won the Danmark Rundt, winning the final stage of the race to overhaul Magnus Sheffield for the general classification, and he also won the points classification. Having been selected for the French team for the road race at the UCI Road World Championships in Australia, Laporte led home the sprint behind the winner Remco Evenepoel, taking the silver medal as a result. He concluded his season with victory at Binche–Chimay–Binche, having attacked with Rasmus Tiller with approximately 10 kilometres (6.2 miles) remaining, before dropping Tiller in the closing stages.

==== 2023 ====
Having finished third in his first start of the season at February's Omloop Het Nieuwsblad, Laporte won two consecutive starts in four days the following month. At Gent–Wevelgem, Wout van Aert and Laporte attacked on the Kemmelberg with 52 kilometres (32 miles) remaining, staying clear of the field into Wevelgem – but unlike the previous year's E3 Saxo Bank Classic, it was Laporte that prevailed for France's first win at the race since Philippe Gaumont in 1997. Laporte then won Dwars door Vlaanderen after a late solo attack from the lead group that he had bridged to a couple of kilometres earlier. After a tenth-place finish at Paris–Roubaix – following two punctures, including one suffered on the Trouée d'Arenberg – Laporte signed a three-year contract extension with Team Jumbo–Visma, extending his contract until the end of the 2026 season. In his final start in preparation for the Tour de France, Laporte took the opening stage of the Critérium du Dauphiné after catching Rune Herregodts, the sole remaining breakaway rider, just before the line in Chambon-sur-Lac. Having held the leader's jersey through the next stage of the race, Laporte then won the third stage in a sprint finish in Le Coteau. He would ultimately cede the jersey following the fourth stage, an individual time trial, but held onto the points classification lead for the remainder of the race.

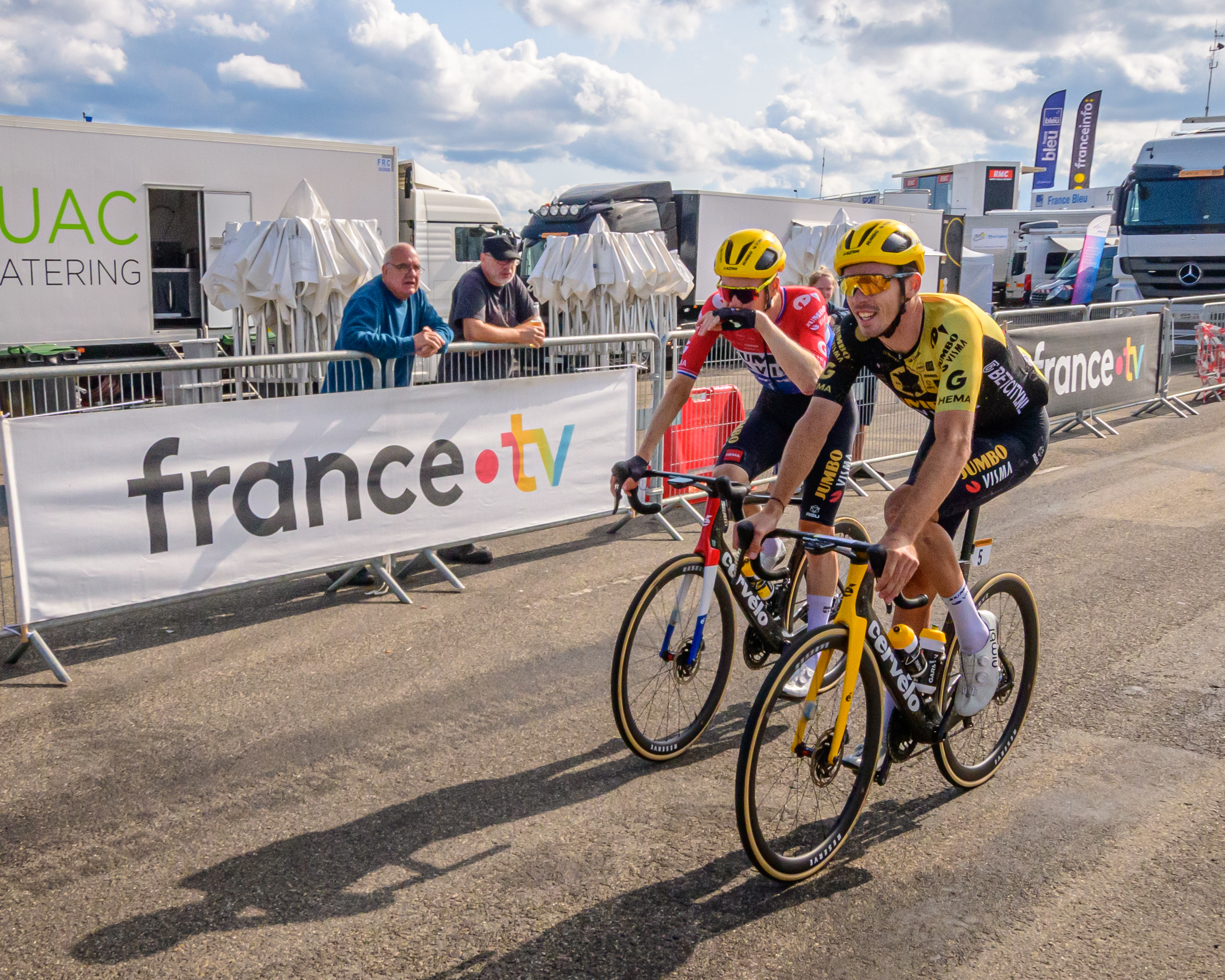
Laporte (right) with teammate Dylan van Baarle at the 2023 Tour de France

At the Tour de France, Laporte played a part in a second consecutive overall victory for Jonas Vingegaard, with his best individual stage finish being sixth on stage nineteen when he was part of the breakaway. Following his silver medal in 2022, Laporte was seen to be a leading contender for the road race at the UCI Road World Championships in Scotland, but he did not finish. After a sixth-place finish at the Grand Prix Cycliste de Québec the following month, Laporte then won the road race at the UEC European Road Championships, managing to fend off a small group of riders – including trade teammates Van Aert and Olav Kooij – following a 12-kilometre (7.5-mile) solo move in Drenthe. He then completed the season with three top-six finishes at the Famenne Ardenne Classic (fourth), the Münsterland Giro (fifth) and Paris–Tours (sixth). For his performances in 2023, Laporte was the winner of the Vélo d'Or français as the best French road rider of the season and received the Trophée Bernard Hinault in October.

==== 2024 ====
Laporte started the season with three top-ten finishes in his first three starts, with a best of fourth at Kuurne–Brussels–Kuurne, but was ruled out of attempting to defend his 2023 victory at Gent–Wevelgem. Laporte was drafted into Visma–Lease a Bike's Giro d'Italia team – to make his first start at the race – working as a lead-out rider for Olav Kooij, following injuries suffered by Wout van Aert during the spring classics. Laporte abandoned the race prior to the eighth stage, with Kooij following suit prior to stage ten. Following the Tour de France, Laporte formed part of the France team for the road race at the Paris Olympics. With compatriot Valentin Madouas in front, Laporte remained within a small group that would ultimately contest the bronze medal behind Remco Evenepoel and Madouas. Laporte won the sprint to claim the bronze medal, as Madouas and Laporte took France's first medals in the event since Arnaud Geyre's silver medal in 1956.

==== 2025 ====
Laporte began to feel unwell shortly before a planned altitude training camp in January. Tests showed that he had contracted cytomegalovirus, causing him to miss the spring classics as well as the Tour de France. He would later return to competition in August, and finished in second place at Paris–Tours towards the end of the season.

== Career achievements ==
=== Major results ===
2012
1st Stage 2 Tour de Moselle
5th Road race, National Under-23 Road Championships
2013
1st Stage 3 Tour de la Manche
2nd Road race, Mediterranean Games
5th Road race, Jeux de la Francophonie
6th La Côte Picarde
7th Gran Premio Industrie del Marmo
2014
6th La Roue Tourangelle
2015 (1 pro win)
1st Tour de Vendée
3rd Le Samyn
3rd Grand Prix de Wallonie
9th Overall Driedaagse van West-Vlaanderen
2016
6th Paris–Bourges
2017 (1)
1st Tour de Vendée
5th Paris–Bourges
7th Overall Étoile de Bessèges
8th Overall Danmark Rundt
2018 (6)
1st Tro-Bro Léon
Tour La Provence

1st Points classification
1st Stages 1 & 3

1st Stage 1 Tour de Luxembourg
1st Stage 3 (ITT) Tour of Belgium
2nd Overall Étoile de Bessèges

1st Stage 2

2nd Grand Prix d'Isbergues
3rd Paris–Bourges
4th Gent–Wevelgem
5th Grand Prix de Fourmies
2019 (9)
1st Overall Tour Poitou-Charentes en Nouvelle-Aquitaine

1st Stages 1, 2 & 4 (ITT)

1st Overall Étoile de Bessèges

1st Points classification
1st Stages 2 & 4 (ITT)

Tour de Luxembourg

1st Prologue & Stage 1

2nd Tour de Vendée
2nd Duo Normand (with Anthony Perez)
3rd Grand Prix d'Isbergues
6th Grand Prix de Wallonie
9th Dwars door Vlaanderen
2021 (4)
1st Grand Prix de Wallonie
1st Circuit de Wallonie
Étoile de Bessèges

1st Points classification
1st Stage 1

1st Stage 1 Tour du Limousin
2nd Dwars door Vlaanderen
5th Time trial, National Road Championships
6th Paris–Roubaix
7th Eschborn–Frankfurt
9th Tro-Bro Léon
2022 (5)
1st Overall Danmark Rundt

1st Points classification
1st Stage 5

1st Binche–Chimay–Binche
1st Stage 19 Tour de France
1st Stage 1 Paris–Nice
2nd Road race, UCI Road World Championships
2nd E3 Saxo Bank Classic
2nd Gent–Wevelgem
8th Kuurne–Brussels–Kuurne
9th Tour of Flanders
2023 (5)
1st Road race, UEC European Road Championships
1st Gent–Wevelgem
1st Dwars door Vlaanderen
Critérium du Dauphiné

1st Points classification
1st Stages 1 & 3

3rd Omloop Het Nieuwsblad
4th Famenne Ardenne Classic
5th Münsterland Giro
6th Grand Prix Cycliste de Québec
6th Kuurne–Brussels–Kuurne
6th Paris–Tours
10th Paris–Roubaix
2024 (1)
1st Paris–Tours
3rd Road race, Olympic Games
3rd Elfstedenrace
4th Overall Renewi Tour
4th Kuurne–Brussels–Kuurne
5th Omloop Het Nieuwsblad
9th Road race, UEC European Road Championships
10th Strade Bianche
2025 (1)
1st Overall Tour of Holland
2nd Paris–Tours
3rd Binche–Chimay–Binche
2026 (1)
1st Stage 1 Vuelta a Andalucía
3rd Gent–Wevelgem
3rd Paris–Tours
4th Overall Danmark Rundt
4th Omloop Het Nieuwsblad
5th Paris–Roubaix
7th E3 Saxo Classic
7th Dwars door Vlaanderen
9th Tour of Flanders

==== Grand Tour general classification results timeline ====
Grand Tour	2015	2016	2017	2018	2019	2020	2021	2022	2023	2024
Giro d'Italia	—	—	—	—	—	—	—	—	—	DNF
Tour de France	127	157	133	124	DNF	107	91	74	80	84
Vuelta a España	Has not contested during his career									

==== Classics results timeline ====
Monument	2014	2015	2016	2017	2018	2019	2020	2021	2022	2023	2024	2025	2026
Milan–San Remo	—	129	85	30	13	61	102	22	22	13	DNF	—	16
Tour of Flanders	—	—	—	DNF	DNF	DNF	82	11	9	14	—	—	9
Paris–Roubaix	103	—	20	39	68	33	NH	6	DNF	10	25	—	5
Liège–Bastogne–Liège	Has not contested during his career												
Giro di Lombardia	Has not contested during his career												
Classic	2014	2015	2016	2017	2018	2019	2020	2021	2022	2023	2024	2025	2026
Omloop Het Nieuwsblad	—	DNF	91	DNF	—	31	—	13	—	3	5	—	4
Kuurne–Brussels–Kuurne	—	DNF	—	85	—	—	—	76	8	6	4	—	30
Strade Bianche	—	—	—	—	—	—	—	—	—	—	10	—	—
E3 Harelbeke	—	—	—	—	—	DNF	NH	—	2	23	—	—	7
Gent–Wevelgem	—	DNF	DNF	15	4	39	DNF	78	2	1	—	—	3
Dwars door Vlaanderen	—	DNF	16	49	16	9	NH	2	—	1	—	—	7
Grand Prix Cycliste de Québec	—	—	—	—	—	—	Not held		39	6	—	57	—
Grand Prix Cycliste de Montréal	—	—	—	—	—	—	Not held		75	28	—	DNF	—
Paris–Tours	DNF	44	112	DNF	72	—	—	54	39	6	1	2	3

==== Major championships timeline ====
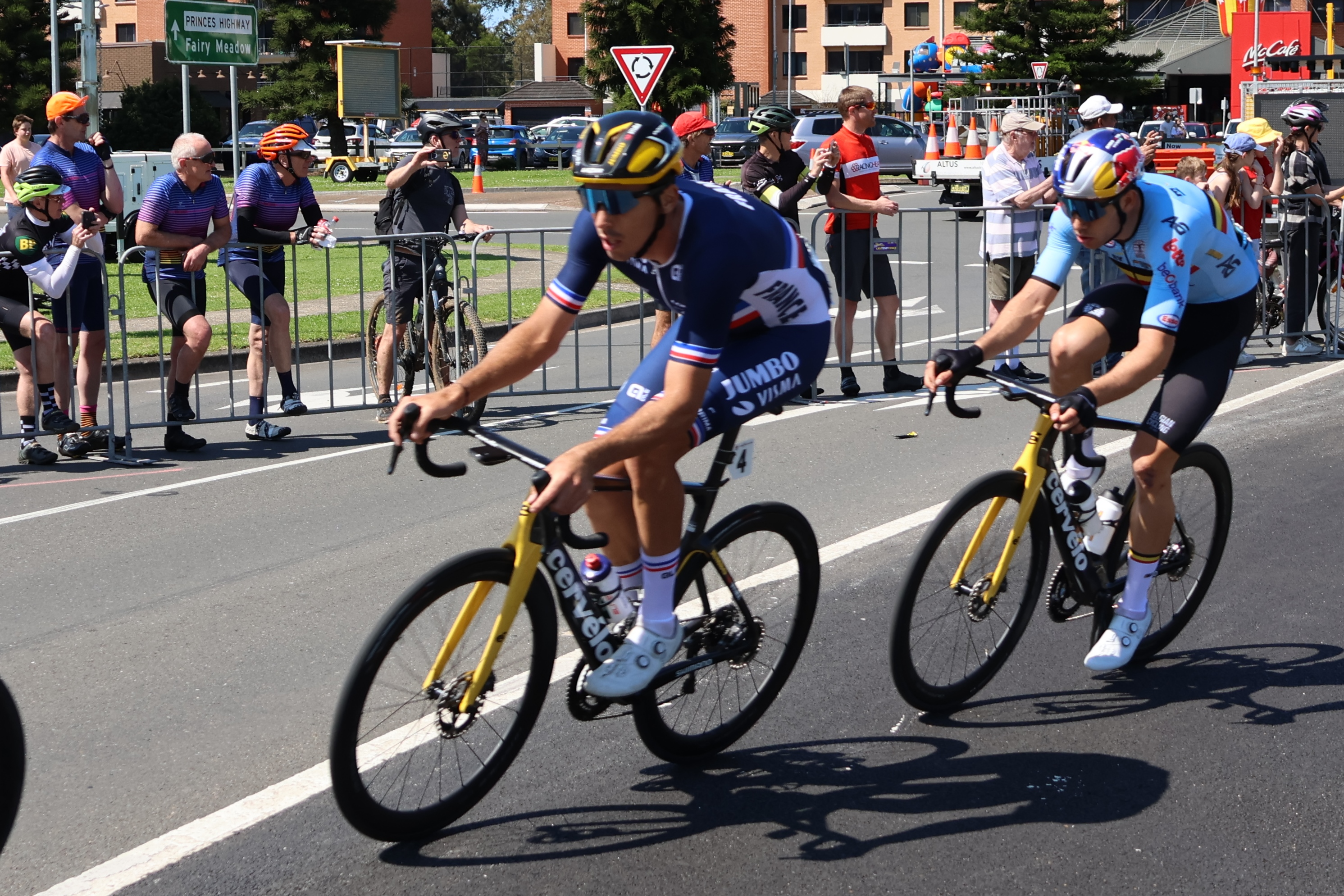
Laporte (left) won the silver medal in the road race at the 2022 UCI Road World Championships in Australia

Event		2013	2014	2015	2016	2017	2018	2019	2020	2021	2022	2023	2024
Olympic Games	Road race	Not held			—	Not held				—	Not held		3
World Championships	Road race	—	—	—	DNF	—	—	DNF	—	DNF	2	DNF	—
European Championships	Road race	Race did not exist			—	—	DNF	—	—	—	—	1	9
National Championships	Road race	—	88	DNF	DNF	48	17	30	7	DNF	—	—	18
National Championships	Time trial	26	—	—	—	—	—	—	—	5	—	—	—

Legend
—	Did not compete
DNF	Did not finish
IP	In progress
NH	Not held

=== Awards ===
In October 2023, Laporte was announced as the winner of the Vélo d'Or français as the best French road rider of the season and received the Trophée Bernard Hinault.
