= Rousson, Gard =

Rousson
- Commune
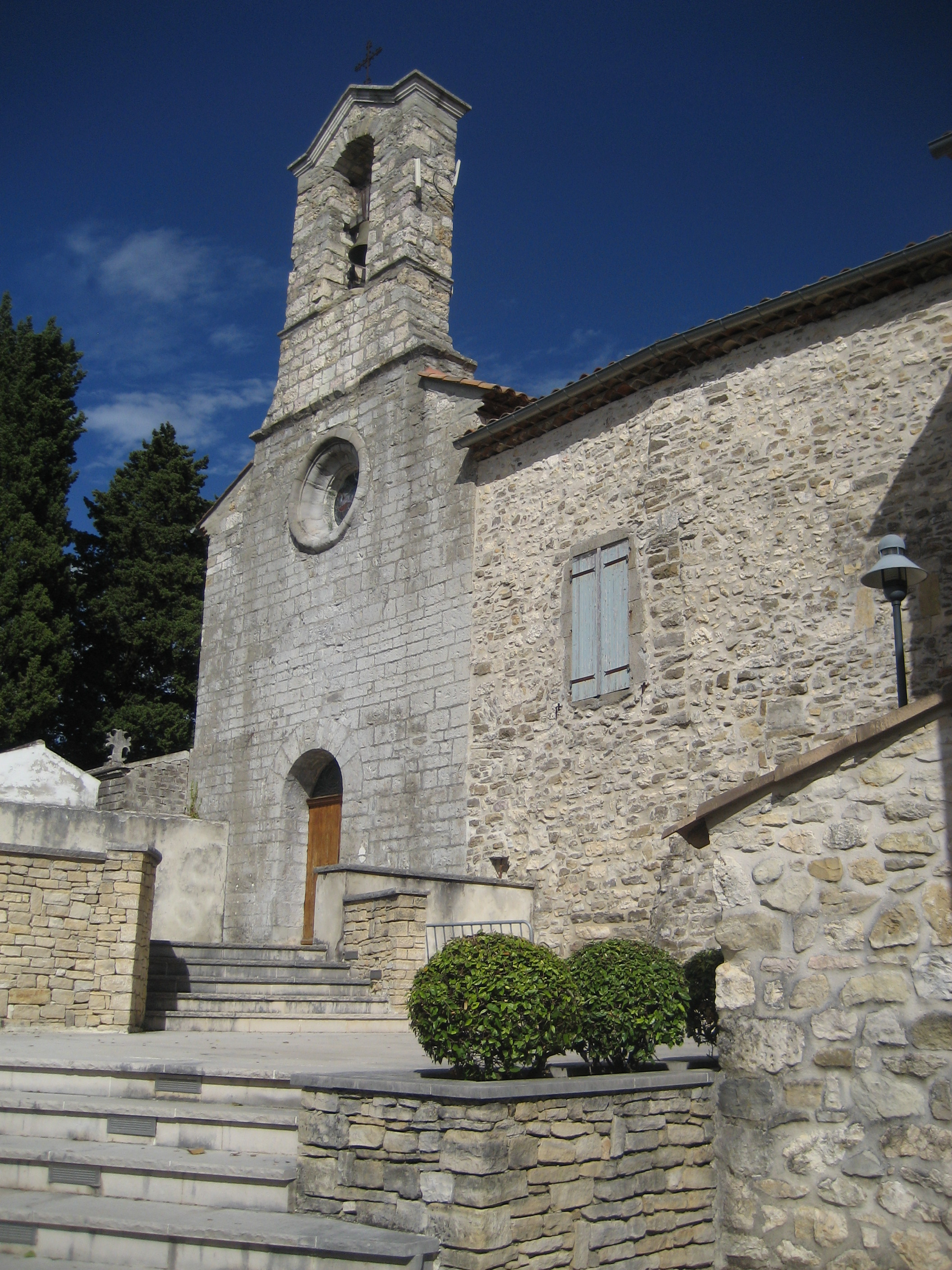
- The church of the plateau of Rousson

- Coat of arms
- Location of Rousson
- Location within France Location within Occitanie
- Coordinates: 44°10′47″N 4°09′03″E
- Country: France
- Region: Occitania
- Department: Gard
- Arrondissement: Alès
- Canton: Rousson
- Intercommunality: Alès Agglomération

Government
  - Mayor (2020–2026): Ghislain Chassary
- Area^{1}: 32.57 km^{2} (12.58 sq mi)
- Elevation: 400 m (1,300 ft)
- Highest elevation: 535 m (1,755 ft)
- Lowest elevation: 136 m (446 ft)
- Population (2023): 4,456
  - Density: 136.8/km^{2} (354.3/sq mi)
- Time zone: UTC+01:00 (CET)
  - Summer (DST): UTC+02:00 (CEST)
- INSEE/Postal code: 30223 /30340
- ^{1} French Land Register data, which excludes lakes, ponds, glaciers > 1 km^{2} (0.386 sq mi or 247 acres) and river estuaries.

Rousson (French pronunciation: [ʁusɔ̃]; Occitan: Rosson) is a commune in the Gard department in southern France.

== Population ==
Historical population

Year	Pop.	±% p.a.
1793	670	—
1821	931	+1.18%
1846	1,341	+1.47%
1872	1,313	−0.08%
1901	1,356	+0.11%
1926	1,395	+0.11%
1946	1,257	−0.52%
1962	1,232	−0.13%
1968	1,389	+2.02%

Year	Pop.	±% p.a.
1975	1,719	+3.09%
1982	2,271	+4.06%
1990	3,164	+4.23%
1999	3,019	−0.52%
2007	3,436	+1.63%
2012	3,829	+2.19%
2017	4,106	+1.41%
2023	4,456	+1.37%

Source: EHESS and INSEE (1968-2023)

== Sights ==
- Jardins ethnobotaniques de la Gardie

== See also ==
- Communes of the Gard department
