= Saint-Siffret =

- Commune
- Coat of arms
- Location of Saint-Siffret
- Location within France Location within Occitanie
- Coordinates: 44°01′05″N 4°28′01″E
- Country: France
- Region: Occitania
- Department: Gard
- Arrondissement: Nîmes
- Canton: Uzès

Government
  - Mayor (2020–2026): Dominique Vincent
- Area^{1}: 11.28 km^{2} (4.36 sq mi)
- Elevation: 120 m (390 ft)
- Highest elevation: 209 m (686 ft)
- Lowest elevation: 83 m (272 ft)
- Population (2023): 1,126
  - Density: 99.82/km^{2} (258.5/sq mi)
- Time zone: UTC+01:00 (CET)
  - Summer (DST): UTC+02:00 (CEST)
- INSEE/Postal code: 30299 /30700
- ^{1} French Land Register data, which excludes lakes, ponds, glaciers > 1 km^{2} (0.386 sq mi or 247 acres) and river estuaries.

Saint-Siffret (French pronunciation: [sɛ̃ sifʁɛ]; Occitan: Sent Sifret) is a commune in the Gard department in southern France.

== Population ==
Historical population
| Year | Pop. | ±% p.a. |
|---|---|---|
| 1968 | 214 | — |
| 1975 | 356 | +7.54% |
| 1982 | 489 | +4.64% |
| 1990 | 657 | +3.76% |
| 1999 | 792 | +2.10% |
| 2007 | 930 | +2.03% |
| 2012 | 1,063 | +2.71% |
| 2017 | 1,067 | +0.08% |
| 2023 | 1,126 | +0.90% |
Source: INSEE

== See also ==
- Communes of the Gard department
