= Nils Politt =

German cyclist (born 1994)

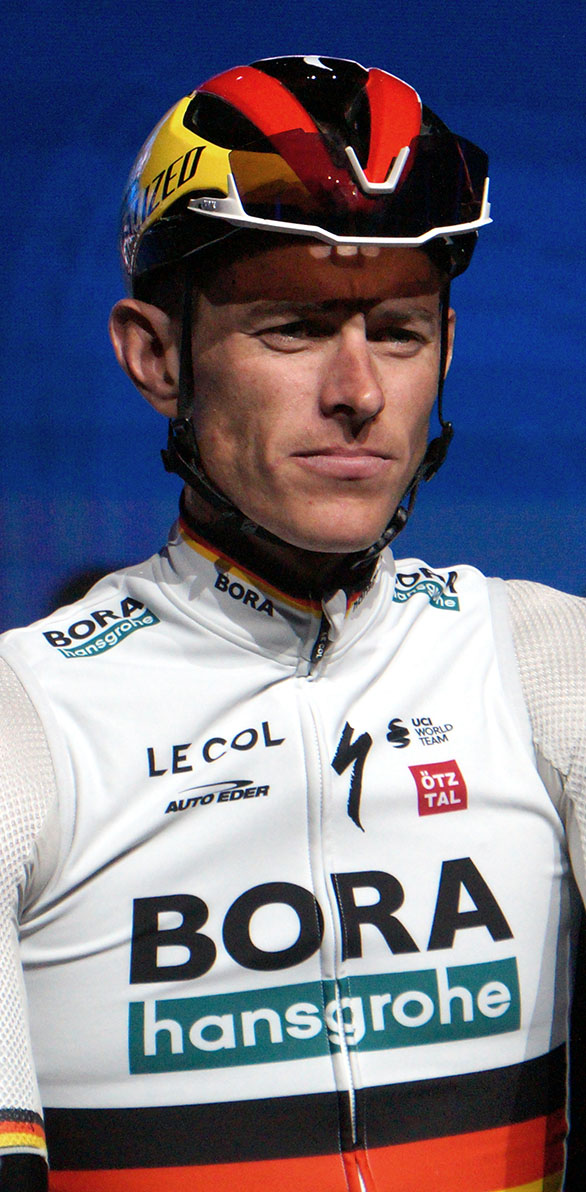
- Politt in 2023

Personal information
- Full name: Nils Politt
- Nickname: The Giraffe
- Born: 6 March 1994 (age 32) Cologne, Germany
- Height: 1.92 m (6 ft 4 in)
- Weight: 80 kg (176 lb)

Cycling career
- Sport: Cycling
- Current team: UAE Team Emirates XRG
- Discipline: Road
- Role: Rider
- Rider type: Rouleur; Classics specialist

Amateur teams
- 2005–2012: RV Komet–Delia 09 Köln e.V.
- 2015: Team Katusha (stagiaire)

Professional teams
- 2013–2015: Team Stölting
- 2016–2019: Team Katusha
- 2020: Israel Start-Up Nation
- 2021–2023: Bora–Hansgrohe
- 2024–: UAE Team Emirates

Major wins
- Grand Tours Tour de France 1 individual stage (2021) Stage races Deutschland Tour (2021) One-day races and Classics National Road Race Championships (2022) National Time Trial Championships (2023, 2024, 2026)
Medal record
Representing Germany
Men's road bicycle racing
World Championships
Silver medal – second place	2019 Yorkshire	Mixed team relay
European Championships
Silver medal – second place	2024 Limburg	Mixed team relay

Nils Politt (born 6 March 1994) is a German cyclist, who currently rides for UCI WorldTeam UAE Team Emirates XRG.

== Career ==
=== Team Katusha (2016–2020) ===
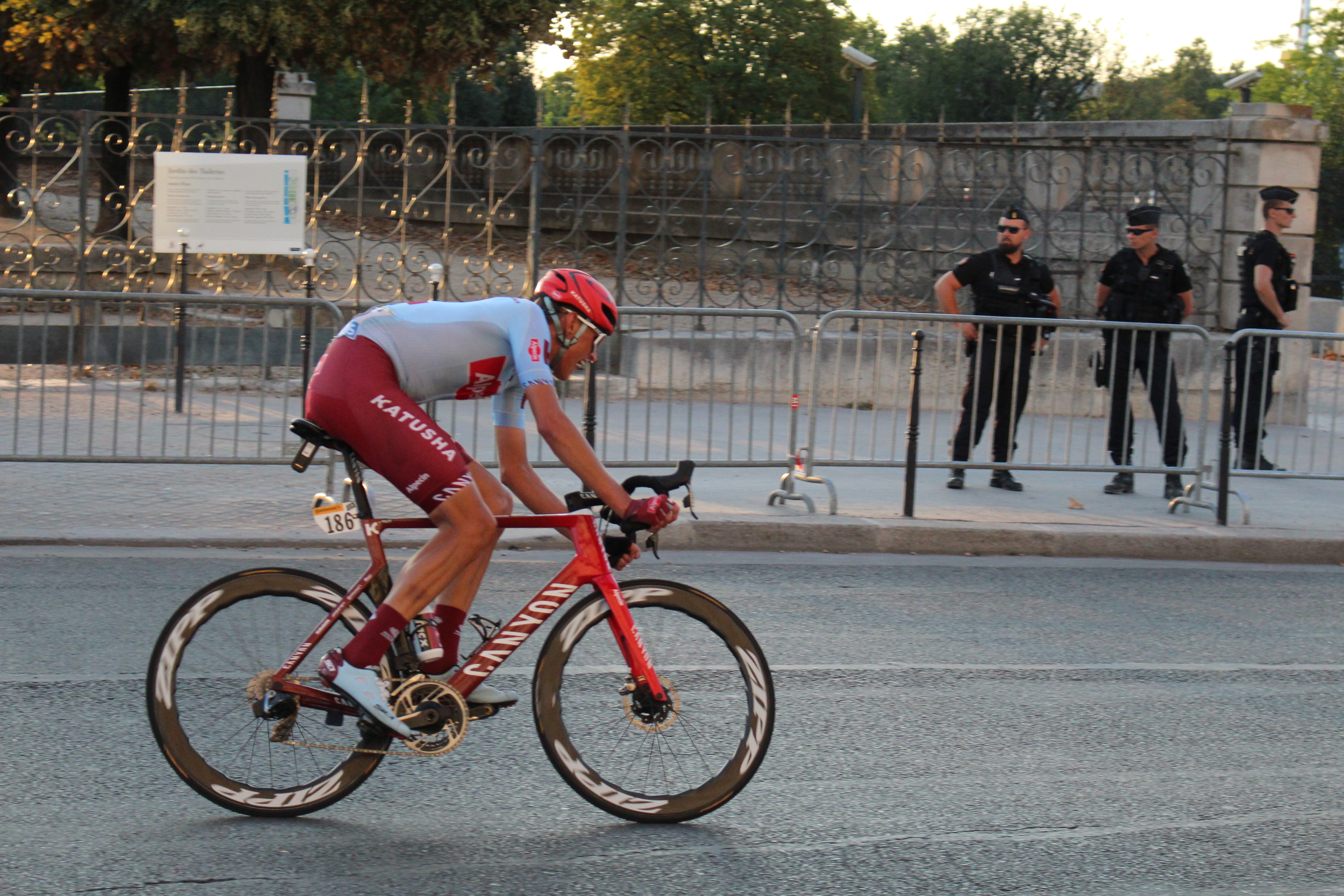
Politt at the 2019 Tour de France

In September 2015 Team Katusha announced that Politt had signed a two-year contract with the team from 2016, and that he would make his debut for the team as a stagiaire at the Tour de l'Eurométropole later that month. In June 2017, he was named in the startlist for the Tour de France.

2019 was to be a breakthrough season for Politt, beginning with a second place in the individual time trial at Paris–Nice. He then went on to place sixth in the E3 BinckBank Classic, fifth in the Tour of Flanders, and second in Paris–Roubaix.

=== Israel Start-Up Nation (2020) ===
In 2020 Politt joined Israel Start-Up Nation which bought Team Katusha–Alpecin's UCI WorldTour license in 2019. Also joining the team was former Team Katusha–Alpecin teammate Rick Zabel, who played an important role in Politt's second place at the 2019 Paris–Roubaix. Hired by the team to play a leading role in the spring classics, Politt would also have the opportunity to learn from experienced teammates like André Greipel.

He once again performed well at Paris–Nice, with a fourth place on stage 2. However, there would be no other notable results in a season disrupted by the COVID-19 pandemic.

=== Bora–Hansgrohe (2021–2023) ===
In August 2020, Politt signed a three-year contract with Bora–Hansgrohe, from the 2021 season onwards. In July 2021, Politt won the twelfth stage of the Tour de France, having featured as part of an initial thirteen-rider breakaway, before making a solo attack with just under 12 kilometres (7.5 miles) remaining. The following month, he won a stage and the general classification at the Deutschland Tour.

In May 2022, he won at Rund um Köln. A month later he won the German National Road Race Championships. Politt rode the Tour de France for the sixth time, supporting his teammate Aleksandr Vlasov to fifth place in the general classification.

Politt started the 2023 season well with a seventh place at Omloop Het Nieuwsblad, yet failed to break into the top 20 at any of the other spring classics. In June, Politt won another national championship jersey, this time in the individual time trial.

=== UAE Team Emirates (2024–) ===
In 2024, Politt moved to UAE Team Emirates on a three-year contract. He produced strong results in his first spring season with the team, riding to a second place finish at the Omloop Het Nieuwsblad, third place at the Tour of Flanders and fourth at Paris–Roubaix.

== Major results ==
=== Road ===
2012
2nd Time trial, National Junior Championships
2013
2nd Time trial, National Under-23 Championships
2014
1st Time trial, National Under-23 Championships
2nd Eschborn-Frankfurt City Loop U23
3rd Overall Tour de Berlin
2015
National Under-23 Championships

1st Road race
2nd Time trial

2nd Rund um Düren
3rd Kattekoers
6th Overall Bayern–Rundfahrt
2016
3rd Time trial, National Championships
3rd Overall Driedaagse van West-Vlaanderen
5th Le Samyn
6th Tour de l'Eurométropole
9th Overall Three Days of De Panne
2017
National Championships

3rd Time trial
4th Road race

6th Overall Étoile de Bessèges
2018 (1 pro win)
2nd Overall Deutschland Tour

1st Stage 4

3rd Münsterland Giro
5th Time trial, National Championships
7th Paris–Roubaix
2019
2nd Team relay, UCI World Championships
National Championships

2nd Time trial
4th Road race

2nd Paris–Roubaix
4th Rund um Köln
5th Overall Tour of Britain
5th Tour of Flanders
6th E3 Binckbank Classic
2021 (3)
1st Overall Deutschland Tour

1st Stage 3

Tour de France

1st Stage 12
Combativity award Stage 12

3rd Overall Étoile de Bessèges
4th Time trial, National Championships
7th Kuurne–Brussels–Kuurne
9th Bredene Koksijde Classic
10th Omloop Het Nieuwsblad
2022 (2)
National Championships

1st Road race
3rd Time trial

1st Rund um Köln
5th Dwars door Vlaanderen
Combativity award Stage 15 Tour de France
2023 (1)
1st Time trial, National Championships
7th Omloop Het Nieuwsblad
8th Hamburg Cyclassics
8th Rund um Köln
9th Overall Deutschland Tour
9th Overall Tour of Britain
10th Dwars door Vlaanderen
2024 (1)
1st Time trial, National Championships
1st Stage 3 (TTT) Paris–Nice
2nd Omloop Het Nieuwsblad
3rd Tour of Flanders
4th Paris–Roubaix
7th Time trial, UEC European Championships
7th E3 Saxo Classic
2025
4th Time trial, National Championships
2026 (2)
1st Time trial, National Championships
1st Stage 5 Tour of Britain
8th Trofeo Calvià
9th Paris–Roubaix

==== Grand Tour general classification results timeline ====
Grand Tour	2017	2018	2019	2020	2021	2022	2023	2024	2025
Giro d'Italia	—	—	—	—	—	—	—	—	—
Tour de France	95	87	64	120	50	56	62	75	75
Vuelta a España	—	—	—	—	—	—	—	—	—

==== Classics results timeline ====
Monument	2016	2017	2018	2019	2020	2021	2022	2023	2024	2025	2026
Milan–San Remo	—	—	61	27	—	—	—	21	—	134	—
Tour of Flanders	89	42	17	5	19	22	47	20	3	66	34
Paris–Roubaix	DNF	27	7	2	NH	DNF	22	35	4	DNF	9
Liège–Bastogne–Liège	—	—	—	81	—	—	—	—	—	—	—
Giro di Lombardia	Has not contested during his career										
Classic	2016	2017	2018	2019	2020	2021	2022	2023	2024	2025	2026
Omloop Het Nieuwsblad	100	DNF	83	19	47	10	27	7	2	50	14
Kuurne–Brussels–Kuurne	83	76	13	DSQ	37	7	46	—	26	43	39
E3 Harelbeke	47	70	54	6	NH	—	72	13	7	18	22
Gent–Wevelgem	—	—	—	—	52	—	79	20	27	34	18
Dwars door Vlaanderen	110	52	49	21	NH	38	5	10	12	DNF	47
Hamburg Cyclassics	132	82	27	16	Not held		24	8	36	43	

Legend
—	Did not compete
NH	Not held
DNS	Did not start
DNF	Did not finish
DSQ	Disqualified

=== Track ===
2011
National Junior Championships

1st Team pursuit
2nd Madison (with Stefan Schneider)

2012
1st Madison, National Junior Championships (with Nils Schomber)
2020
1st Six Days of Bremen (with Kenny De Ketele)
2024
3rd Six Days of Bremen (with Lindsay De Vylder)
2025
1st Six Days of Bremen (with Yoeri Havik)
