= Valentin Madouas =

French cyclist (born 1996)

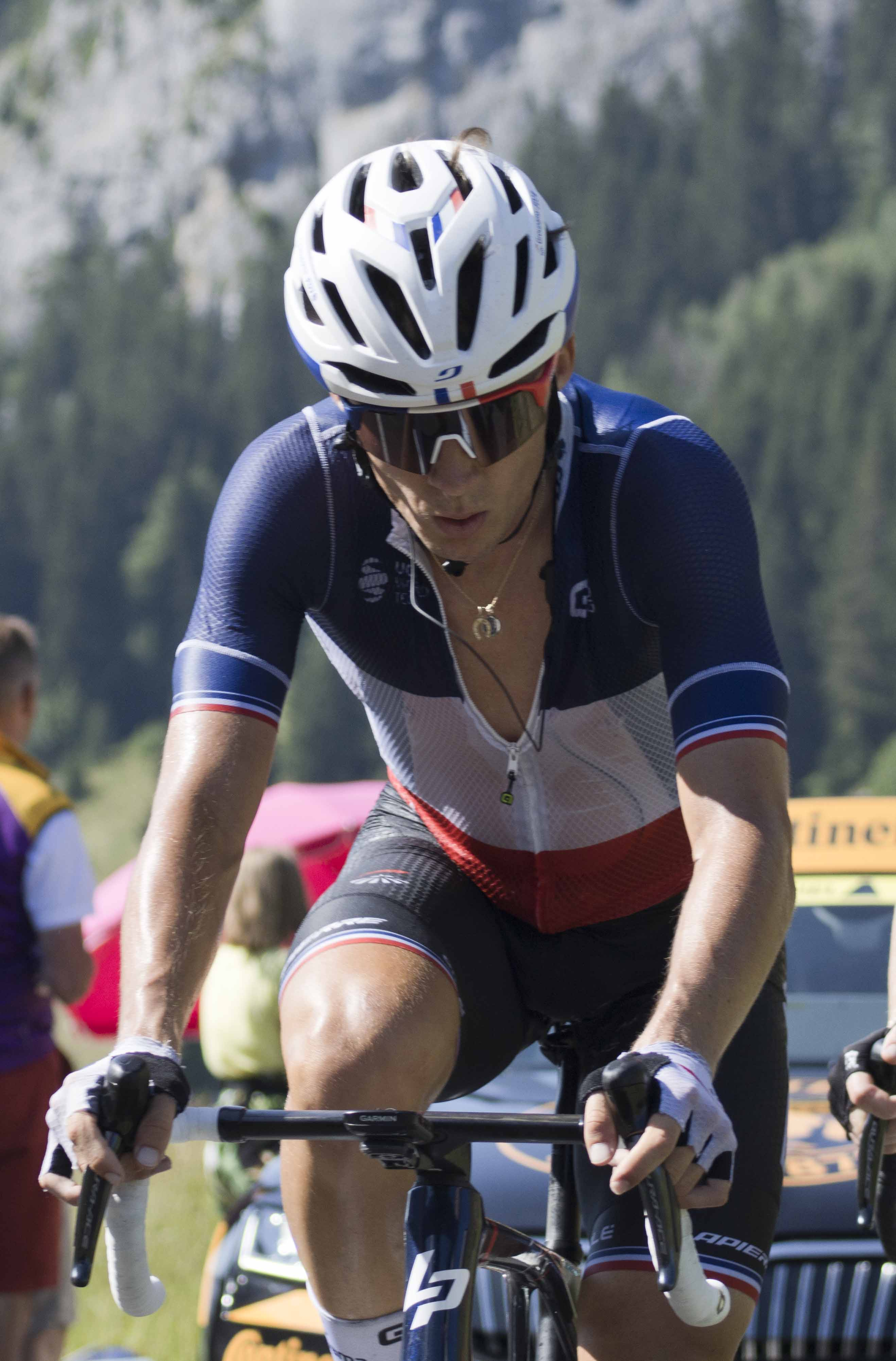
- Madouas during 2023 Tour de France

Personal information
- Born: 12 July 1996 (age 30) Brest, France
- Height: 1.79 m (5 ft 10 in)
- Weight: 71 kg (157 lb)

Cycling career
- Sport: Cycling
- Current team: Groupama–FDJ United
- Discipline: Road
- Role: Rider
- Rider type: Puncheur; Classics specialist

Amateur teams
- 2012–2014: BIC 2000 Junior
- 2015–2016: BIC 2000
- 2015: Bretagne–Séché Environnement (stagiaire)
- 2017: Team UC Nantes Atlantique
- 2017: FDJ (stagiaire)

Professional team
- 2018–: FDJ

Major wins
- One-day races and Classics National Road Race Championships (2023) Bretagne Classic (2023)
Medal record
Men's road bicycle racing
Representing France
Olympic Games
Silver medal – second place	2024 Paris	Road race

Valentin Madouas (born 12 July 1996) is a French cyclist, who currently rides for UCI WorldTeam Groupama–FDJ United.

== Career ==
Described as a puncheur, Madouas has seen success in one-day classic races as well as having strong climbing abilities. He won his first pro race in 2018 at Paris–Bourges in his first season as a professional. In May 2019, competed in the Giro d'Italia, his first Grand Tour. In August 2020, he finished 27th overall in his first Tour de France. He saw his first top 10 in a Grand Tour at the 2022 Tour de France, placing 10th. He obtained his first podium place in a classic with a third place at the 2022 Tour of Flanders. That season, he also won two stages of the Tour de Luxembourg in addition to the one-day Tour du Doubs. In June 2023, he won the French National Road Race Championships after placing second in the Strade Bianche three months earlier. In September, he took his first UCI WorldTour level victory, winning a four-rider sprint at the Bretagne Classic. He won a silver medal in the road race at the 2024 Paris Olympics.

== Personal life ==
His father is Laurent Madouas who was also a professional cyclist, riding from 1989 until 2001.

== Major results ==
2014
2nd Overall GP Général Patton

1st Stage 1

3rd Overall Ronde des Vallées

1st Stage 2 (ITT)

4th Paris–Roubaix Juniors
2016
1st Road race, National Amateur Road Championships
1st Stage 2 Kreiz Breizh Elites
7th Overall ZLM Tour
2017
8th Overall Ronde de l'Isard
2018 (1 pro win)
1st Paris–Bourges
2nd Paris–Camembert
4th Overall Tour du Haut Var
5th Paris–Tours
6th Grand Prix d'Isbergues
7th Overall Four Days of Dunkirk
7th Grand Prix d'Ouverture La Marseillaise
8th Overall Route d'Occitanie

1st Young rider classification

8th Bretagne Classic
2019
2nd Classic Sud-Ardèche
2nd La Drôme Classic
5th Road race, National Road Championships
8th Overall Étoile de Bessèges

1st Young rider classification

8th Amstel Gold Race
2020
2nd Grand Prix La Marseillaise
4th Paris–Tours
10th Mont Ventoux Dénivelé Challenge
2021 (1)
1st Polynormande
2nd Boucles de l'Aulne
2nd Classic Loire Atlantique
3rd Tour du Jura
5th Tour du Doubs
7th Overall Tour des Alpes-Maritimes et du Var
8th Bretagne Classic
2022 (3)
1st Tour du Doubs
1st Mountains classification, Paris–Nice
3rd Overall Tour de Luxembourg

1st Stages 1 & 5

3rd Tour of Flanders
4th Overall Tour du Limousin

1st Mountains classification

4th Overall Tour des Alpes-Maritimes et du Var
7th E3 Saxo Bank Classic
10th Overall Tour de France
2023 (2)
1st Road race, National Road Championships
1st Bretagne Classic
2nd Strade Bianche
4th Grand Prix Cycliste de Montréal
4th Vuelta a Murcia
4th Paris–Camembert
5th Liège–Bastogne–Liège
8th E3 Saxo Classic
2024
2nd Road race, Olympic Games
5th Vuelta a Murcia
6th Amstel Gold Race
7th Liège–Bastogne–Liège
9th Overall Tour du Limousin
2025
3rd Tro-Bro Léon

=== Grand Tour general classification results timeline ===
Grand Tour	2019	2020	2021	2022	2023	2024	2025
Giro d'Italia	13	—	—	—	—	—	—
Tour de France	—	27	42	10	20	25	21
Vuelta a España	—	—	—	—	—	—	—

=== Classics results timeline ===
Monument	2018	2019	2020	2021	2022	2023	2024	2025	2026
Milan–San Remo	—	—	—	—	—	—	—	—	—
Tour of Flanders	—	—	14	39	3	DNF	16	17	16
Paris–Roubaix	—	—	NH	—	34	—	—	—	—
Liège–Bastogne–Liège	129	31	25	83	34	5	7	64	
Giro di Lombardia	—	97	—	—	—	27	62	—	
Classic	2018	2019	2020	2021	2022	2023	2024	2025	2026
Strade Bianche	20	—	—	21	—	2	15	39	42
E3 Saxo Bank Classic	—	—	NH	—	7	8	43	17	26
Dwars door Vlaanderen	—	—	NH	117	11	28	13	90	38
Brabantse Pijl	—	—	—	14	—	—	—	—	28
Amstel Gold Race	64	8	NH	27	14	11	6	19	31
La Flèche Wallonne	DNF	40	11	86	—	24	15	26	
Bretagne Classic	8	24	—	8	15	1	44	67	
Grand Prix Cycliste de Québec	49	24	Not held		—	32	36	17	
Grand Prix Cycliste de Montréal	12	48	Not held		—	4	32	15	
Paris–Tours	5	—	4	22	—	—	27	12	

=== Major championships timeline ===
Event		2018	2019	2020	2021	2022	2023	2024	2025	2026
Olympic Games	Road race	Not held			—	Not held		2	Not held	
World Championships	Road race	—	—	34	13	29	15	22	DNF	
European Championships	Road race	—	—	—	DNF	—	—	—	—	
National Championships	Road race	38	5	8	7	64	1	6	11	

Legend
—	Did not compete
DNF	Did not finish
NH	Not held
IP	In progress
