= Tiesj Benoot =

Belgian cyclist (born 1994)

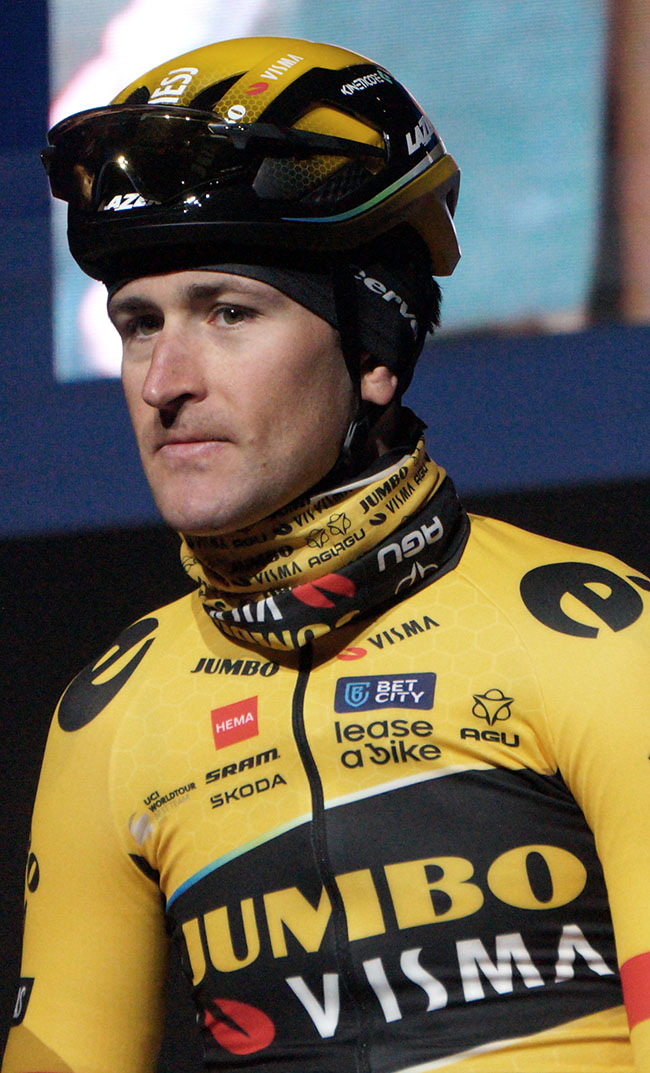
- Benoot in 2023

Personal information
- Full name: Tiesj Benoot
- Nickname: Fantastiesj
- Born: 11 March 1994 (age 32) Ghent, Flanders, Belgium
- Height: 1.90 m (6 ft 3 in)
- Weight: 72 kg (159 lb)

Cycling career
- Sport: Cycling
- Current team: Decathlon CMA CGM Team
- Discipline: Road
- Role: Rider
- Rider type: Classics specialist; Puncheur

Amateur teams
- 2012: Avia–Fuji–Youth
- 2013–2014: Lotto–Belisol U23
- 2014: Lotto–Belisol (stagiaire)

Professional teams
- 2015–2019: Lotto–Soudal
- 2020–2021: Team Sunweb
- 2022–2025: Team Jumbo–Visma
- 2026–: Decathlon CMA CGM

Major wins
- One-day races and Classics Strade Bianche (2018) Kuurne–Brussels–Kuurne (2023)

Tiesj Benoot (born 11 March 1994) is a Belgian cyclist, who currently rides for UCI WorldTeam Decathlon CMA CGM Team.

== Career ==
=== Lotto–Soudal (2015–19) ===
Benoot turned professional with the Belgian UCI World Tour team Lotto–Soudal in 2015, after riding for the Lotto–Belisol U23 outfit in 2013 and 2014, and riding some races as a stagiaire in autumn 2014.

Benoot made an instant impact in the professional ranks by placing fifth in his first Tour of Flanders. Later in the season he showed his abilities in stage races, finishing second overall behind Greg Van Avermaet at the 2015 Tour of Belgium. He also claimed three top-10 finishes in stages of the Critérium du Dauphiné.

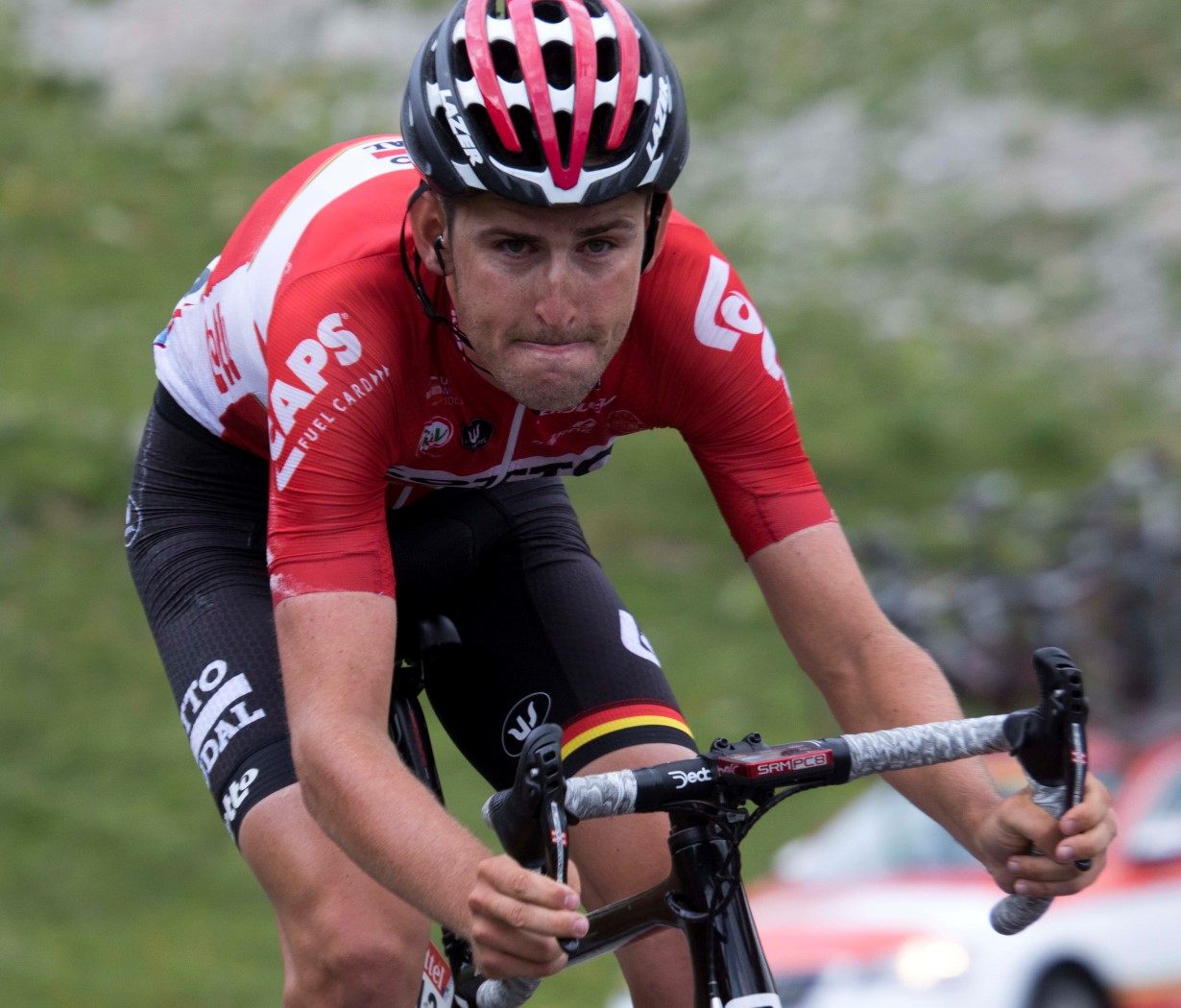
Benoot at the 2017 Tour de France

Benoot showed climbing ability at the 2017 Critérium du Dauphiné, where he finished 12th overall. In June 2017, he was named in the startlist for the 2017 Tour de France. Benoot finished 20th overall in his first Grand Tour.

Benoot won his first professional race in March 2018, soloing to victory in the UCI World Tour's Strade Bianche in torrential rain after attacking from a chasing group to catch leaders Romain Bardet (AG2R La Mondiale) and Wout van Aert (Vérandas Willems–Crelan) before dropping them in the final sector of dirt roads. Benoot soloed to victory by 39 seconds ahead of Bardet.

In August 2018, he was named in the startlist for the 2018 Vuelta a España.

=== Team Sunweb (2020–21) ===
In August 2019, Benoot signed an initial two-year deal with Team Sunweb starting from 2020. He finished second overall at the 2020 Paris–Nice, winning a stage and the points classification. Following the COVID-19 pandemic-enforced suspension of racing, Benoot took top-ten finishes at Liège–Bastogne–Liège (eighth) and the Tour of Flanders (tenth). He also extended his contract with the team until the end of the 2022 season in August 2020. Benoot took no wins in 2021, with a best result of fifth overall at Paris–Nice.

=== Team Jumbo–Visma (2022-2025) ===
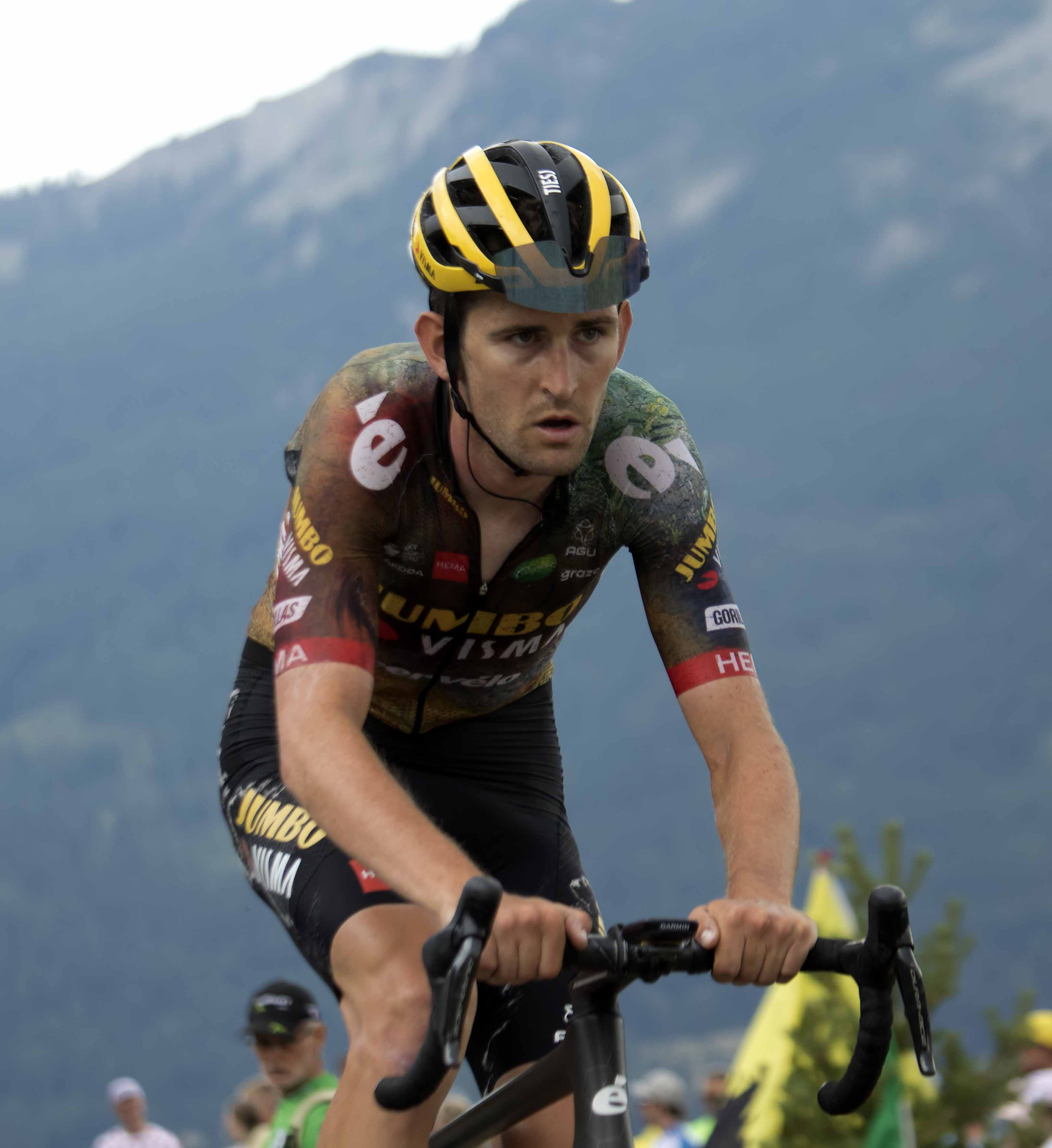
Benoot at the 2022 Tour de France

In December 2021, Benoot was released from his Team DSM contract a year early, and subsequently signed a two-year deal with Team Jumbo–Visma starting from 2022. He made his first start with the team at February's Omloop Het Nieuwsblad, and recorded his first top-ten finish with ninth at the E3 Saxo Bank Classic the following month. He finished second at Dwars door Vlaanderen, having attacked the lead group in the final two kilometres, before being out-sprinted by Mathieu van der Poel at the finish in Waregem. With team leader Wout van Aert sidelined due to COVID-19, Benoot shared team leadership of Team Jumbo–Visma for the following weekend's Tour of Flanders, with Christophe Laporte; Laporte finished ninth while Benoot was thirteenth. The following weekend, Benoot finished third in the Amstel Gold Race, having attacked from the main group in the final kilometre of the race. Team Jumbo-Visma had a historic performance in the 2022 Tour de France. Benoot played a key role supporting the team leaders, especially as injuries and abandons took their toll throughout the race. He survived the race and crossed the finish line in triumph with his surviving teammates.

=== Decathlon (2026) ===
In the winter of 2025, Benoot signed for Decathlon CMA CGM. In February 2026, he suffered a disc herniation, preventing him from taking part in that year's Spring Classic races.

== Personal life ==
Outside of cycling, Benoot studied economics at Ghent University.

Benoot's uncommon first name derives from American singer/songwriter Tish Hinojosa, due to his parents' affinity with both the music and the first name of the artist.

== Major results ==
2011
7th Overall Tour du Valromey
2012
2nd Overall Junior Oberösterreichrundfahrt

1st Points classification
1st Stage 2

3rd Time trial, National Junior Road Championships
3rd Overall Trophée Centre Morbihan
5th Bernaudeau Junior
6th Overall GP Général Patton
8th Overall Liège–La Gleize
8th Overall Keizer der Juniores

1st Stage 1

2013
1st Tour de Moselle
2nd Overall Vuelta a Palencia

1st Stage 4

4th Overall Circuit des Ardennes

1st Points classification
1st Young rider classification

8th Grand Prix des Marbriers
8th Liège–Bastogne–Liège Espoirs
10th Overall Vuelta a la Comunidad de Madrid Under-23

1st Young rider classification
1st Stage 2

2014
2nd Overall Le Triptyque des Monts et Châteaux

1st Points classification

3rd Overall Ronde de l'Isard

1st Young rider classification

3rd Ronde van Vlaanderen Beloften
4th Road race, UCI Under-23 Road World Championships
4th Grote Prijs Stad Zottegem
5th Liège–Bastogne–Liège Espoirs
5th Flèche Ardennaise
6th Road race, UEC European Under-23 Road Championships
8th Binche–Chimay–Binche
10th Overall Danmark Rundt
2015
2nd Overall Tour of Belgium
3rd Handzame Classic
4th Le Samyn
4th Paris–Tours
5th Tour of Flanders
5th Grand Prix Cycliste de Montréal
6th Overall World Ports Classic
6th Ronde van Zeeland Seaports
6th Dwars door Vlaanderen
6th Druivenkoers Overijse
8th Overall Eneco Tour
8th Trofeo Serra de Tramuntana
2016
1st Young rider classification, Volta ao Algarve
3rd Trofeo Serra de Tramuntana
3rd Omloop Het Nieuwsblad
4th Trofeo Pollenca–Port de Andratx
5th Overall Tour de Pologne
6th Grand Prix de Wallonie
7th E3 Harelbeke
7th Brussels Cycling Classic
8th Strade Bianche
9th Heistse Pijl
2017
3rd Brabantse Pijl
3rd Trofeo Pollenca–Port de Andratx
4th Kuurne–Brussels–Kuurne
4th Grand Prix de Wallonie
7th Overall Tour of Belgium
7th Dwars door Vlaanderen
8th Overall Volta ao Algarve

1st Young rider classification

8th Strade Bianche
8th Trofeo Serra de Tramuntana
8th Vuelta a Murcia
9th Clásica de San Sebastián
2018 (1 pro win)
1st Strade Bianche
3rd Brabantse Pijl
4th Overall Tirreno–Adriatico

1st Young rider classification

5th E3 Harelbeke
5th Tour de l'Eurométropole
6th Overall Vuelta a San Juan
6th Paris–Tours
7th Dwars door Vlaanderen
8th Tour of Flanders
2019 (1)
1st Stage 1 Danmark Rundt
2nd Bretagne Classic
4th Overall Tour de Suisse
4th Milano–Torino
5th Strade Bianche
5th Dwars door Vlaanderen
6th Tre Valli Varesine
9th Overall Tour of Britain
9th Tour of Flanders
10th Overall Vuelta a San Juan
Combativity award Stage 9 Tour de France
2020 (1)
2nd Overall Paris–Nice

1st Points classification
1st Stage 6

8th Liège–Bastogne–Liège
10th Tour of Flanders
2021
5th Overall Paris–Nice
7th Liège–Bastogne–Liège
8th Overall Benelux Tour
9th Grand Prix de Wallonie
10th Antwerp Port Epic
2022
2nd Dwars door Vlaanderen
3rd Amstel Gold Race
3rd Clásica de San Sebastián
9th E3 Saxo Bank Classic
2023 (1)
1st Kuurne–Brussels–Kuurne
3rd Strade Bianche
4th Road race, National Road Championships
6th Coppa Bernocchi
7th Liège–Bastogne–Liège
7th La Flèche Wallonne
7th Bretagne Classic
9th Road race, UCI Road World Championships
10th Clásica de San Sebastián
2024
3rd Amstel Gold Race
4th Grand Prix Cycliste de Québec
4th Dwars door Vlaanderen
7th Grand Prix Cycliste de Montréal
9th La Flèche Wallonne
2025
3rd Dwars door Vlaanderen
4th Clásica de San Sebastián
6th Tour of Flanders
7th Grand Prix Cycliste de Montréal
8th Amstel Gold Race

=== General classification results timeline ===
Grand Tour general classification results
Grand Tour	2015	2016	2017	2018	2019	2020	2021	2022	2023	2024	2025	2026
Giro d'Italia	Has not contested during his career											
Tour de France	—	—	20	DNF	59	75	DNF	36	24	49	-	17
Vuelta a España	—	—	—	95	—	—	—	—	—	—	—	
Major stage race general classification results
Race	2015	2016	2017	2018	2019	2020	2021	2022	2023	2024		
Paris–Nice	—	—	—	—	—	2	5	—	—	—		
Tirreno–Adriatico	—	61	66	4	12	—	—	—	34	—		
Volta a Catalunya	—	—	—	—	—	NH	—	—	—	—		
Tour of the Basque Country	—	—	—	—	—	NH	—	—	—	—		
Tour de Romandie	—	—	—	—	—	NH	—	—	—	—		
Critérium du Dauphiné	26	—	12	14	—	DNF	—	71	28	33		
Tour de Suisse	—	DNF	—	—	4	NH	15	—	—	—		

=== Classics results timeline ===
Monument	2015	2016	2017	2018	2019	2020	2021	2022	2023	2024	2025
Milan–San Remo	—	—	133	—	—	20	—	—	—	—	—
Tour of Flanders	5	DNF	DNF	8	9	10	12	13	13	15	6
Paris–Roubaix	100	114	—	—	DNF	NH	—	—	—	—	—
Liège–Bastogne–Liège	—	—	—	23	—	8	7	DNS	7	12	13
Giro di Lombardia	DNF	—	57	25	24	—	29	—	63	58	
Classic	2015	2016	2017	2018	2019	2020	2021	2022	2023	2024	2025
Omloop Het Nieuwsblad	36	3	DNF	59	DNF	14	29	66	15	35	44
Kuurne–Brussels–Kuurne	—	—	4	35	—	64	21	24	1	DNF	62
Strade Bianche	—	8	8	1	5	DNF	—	DNF	3	—	—
E3 Harelbeke	18	7	14	5	16	NH	15	9	DNF	DNF	20
Gent–Wevelgem	—	15	—	—	13	—	—	34	—	40	19
Dwars door Vlaanderen	6	39	7	7	5	NH	23	2	26	4	3
Brabantse Pijl	—	—	3	3	—	—	—	—	—	—	19
Amstel Gold Race	—	DNF	15	DNF	—	NH	15	3	15	3	8
La Flèche Wallonne	—	—	—	52	—	—	—	11	7	9	12
Clásica de San Sebastián	19	DNF	9	—	DNF	NH	—	3	10	—	4
Hamburg Cyclassics	46	—	—	19	—	Not held		—	—	—	—
Bretagne Classic	22	27	—	—	2	—	—	—	7	17	69
Grand Prix Cycliste de Québec	DNF	18	12	—	—	Not held		—	46	4	16
Grand Prix Cycliste de Montréal	5	13	15	—	—	Not held		—	11	7	7
Paris–Tours	4	—	—	6	—	—	—	—	—	—	

Legend
—	Did not compete
DNF	Did not finish
NH	Not held
IP	In progress
