= 2023 UCI World Tour =

Road cycling competitions

2023 UCI WorldTour
- Thirteenth edition of the UCI WorldTour

Details
- Dates: 17 January – 17 October
- Location: Australia; Canada; China; Europe; United Arab Emirates
- Races: 35

The 2023 UCI World Tour was a series of races that include thirty-five road cycling events throughout the 2023 cycling season. The tour started with the Tour Down Under on 17 January, and concluded with the Tour of Guangxi on 17 October.

== Events ==
Races in the 2023 UCI World Tour
Race	Date	Winner	Second	Third
(Australia) Tour Down Under	17–22 January	Jay Vine (AUS)	Simon Yates (GBR)	Pello Bilbao (ESP)
(Australia) Cadel Evans Great Ocean Road Race	29 January	Marius Mayrhofer (GER)	Hugo Page (FRA)	Simon Clarke (AUS)
(United Arab Emirates) UAE Tour	20–26 February	Remco Evenepoel (BEL)	Lucas Plapp (AUS)	Adam Yates (GBR)
(Belgium) Omloop Het Nieuwsblad	25 February	Dylan van Baarle (NED)	Arnaud De Lie (BEL)	Christophe Laporte (FRA)
(Italy) Strade Bianche	4 March	Tom Pidcock (GBR)	Valentin Madouas (FRA)	Tiesj Benoot (BEL)
(France) Paris–Nice	5–12 March	Tadej Pogačar (SLO)	David Gaudu (FRA)	Jonas Vingegaard (DEN)
(Italy) Tirreno–Adriatico	6–12 March	Primož Roglič (SLO)	João Almeida (POR)	Tao Geoghegan Hart (GBR)
(Italy) Milan–San Remo	18 March	Mathieu van der Poel (NED)	Filippo Ganna (ITA)	Wout van Aert (BEL)
(Spain) Volta a Catalunya	20–26 March	Primož Roglič (SLO)	Remco Evenepoel (BEL)	João Almeida (POR)
(Belgium) Classic Brugge–De Panne	22 March	Jasper Philipsen (BEL)	Olav Kooij (NED)	Yves Lampaert (BEL)
(Belgium) E3 Saxo Classic	24 March	Wout van Aert (BEL)	Mathieu van der Poel (NED)	Tadej Pogačar (SLO)
(Belgium) Gent–Wevelgem	26 March	Christophe Laporte (FRA)	Wout van Aert (BEL)	Sep Vanmarcke (BEL)
(Belgium) Dwars door Vlaanderen	29 March	Christophe Laporte (FRA)	Oier Lazkano (ESP)	Neilson Powless (USA)
(Belgium) Tour of Flanders	2 April	Tadej Pogačar (SLO)	Mathieu van der Poel (NED)	Mads Pedersen (DEN)
(Spain) Tour of the Basque Country	3–8 April	Jonas Vingegaard (DEN)	Mikel Landa (ESP)	Ion Izagirre (ESP)
(France) Paris–Roubaix	9 April	Mathieu van der Poel (NED)	Jasper Philipsen (BEL)	Wout van Aert (BEL)
(Netherlands) Amstel Gold Race	16 April	Tadej Pogačar (SLO)	Ben Healy (IRL)	Tom Pidcock (GBR)
(Belgium) La Flèche Wallonne	19 April	Tadej Pogačar (SLO)	Mattias Skjelmose (DEN)	Mikel Landa (ESP)
(Belgium) Liège–Bastogne–Liège	23 April	Remco Evenepoel (BEL)	Tom Pidcock (GBR)	Santiago Buitrago (COL)
(Switzerland) Tour de Romandie	25–30 April	Adam Yates (GBR)	Matteo Jorgenson (USA)	Damiano Caruso (ITA)
(Germany) Eschborn–Frankfurt	1 May	Søren Kragh Andersen (DEN)	Patrick Konrad (AUT)	Alessandro Fedeli (ITA)
(Italy) Giro d'Italia	6–28 May	Primož Roglič (SLO)	Geraint Thomas (GBR)	João Almeida (POR)
(France) Critérium du Dauphiné	4–11 June	Jonas Vingegaard (DEN)	Adam Yates (GBR)	Ben O'Connor (AUS)
(Switzerland) Tour de Suisse	11–18 June	Mattias Skjelmose (DEN)	Juan Ayuso (ESP)	Remco Evenepoel (BEL)
Tour de France	1–23 July	Jonas Vingegaard (DEN)	Tadej Pogačar (SLO)	Adam Yates (GBR)
(Spain) Clásica de San Sebastián	29 July	Remco Evenepoel (BEL)	Pello Bilbao (ESP)	Aleksandr Vlasov (Note: On 1 March 2022, the UCI announced that cyclists from Russia and Belarus would no longer compete under the name or flag of those respective countries due to the Russian invasion of Ukraine.)
(Poland) Tour de Pologne	29 July – 4 August	Matej Mohorič (SLO)	João Almeida (POR)	Michał Kwiatkowski (POL)
(Germany) Hamburg Cyclassics	20 August	Mads Pedersen (DEN)	Danny van Poppel (NED)	Elia Viviani (ITA)
(Belgium) / (Netherlands) Renewi Tour	23–27 August	Tim Wellens (BEL)	Florian Vermeersch (BEL)	Yves Lampaert (BEL)
(Spain) Vuelta a España	26 August – 17 September	Sepp Kuss (USA)	Jonas Vingegaard (DEN)	Primož Roglič (SLO)
Bretagne Classic Ouest–France	3 September	Valentin Madouas (FRA)	Mathieu Burgaudeau (FRA)	Felix Großschartner (AUT)
(Canada) Grand Prix Cycliste de Québec	8 September	Arnaud De Lie (BEL)	Corbin Strong (NZL)	Michael Matthews (AUS)
(Canada) Grand Prix Cycliste de Montréal	10 September	Adam Yates (GBR)	Pavel Sivakov (FRA)	Alex Aranburu (ESP)
(Italy) Il Lombardia	7 October	Tadej Pogačar (SLO)	Andrea Bagioli (ITA)	Primož Roglič (SLO)
(China) Tour of Guangxi	12–17 October	Milan Vader (NED)	Rémy Rochas (FRA)	Ethan Hayter (GBR)

== Teams ==
The eighteen WorldTeams were automatically invited to compete in events, with the top two UCI ProTeams listed on the 2022 UCI World Ranking (Lotto–Dstny and Team TotalEnergies) also invited automatically. Other teams were invited by the organisers of each race.

- AG2R Citroën Team
- Alpecin–Deceuninck
- Arkéa–Samsic
- Astana Qazaqstan Team
- Bora–Hansgrohe
- Cofidis
- EF Education–EasyPost
- Groupama–FDJ
- Ineos Grenadiers
- Intermarché–Circus–Wanty
- Lidl–Trek
- Movistar Team
- Soudal–Quick-Step
- Team Bahrain Victorious
- Team dsm–firmenich
- Team Jayco–AlUla
- Team Jumbo–Visma
- UAE Team Emirates
