= 2025 Tour of Flanders (men's race) =

Cycling race

2025 Ronde van Vlaanderen Elite Mannen
2025 UCI World Tour, race 14 of 36
- Event poster with previous winners Mathieu van der Poel and Elisa Longo Borghini

Race details
- Dates: 6 April 2025
- Stages: 1
- Distance: 269 km (167 mi)
- Winning time: 5h 58' 41"

Results
	Winner	Tadej Pogačar (SLO)	(UAE Team Emirates XRG)
	Second	Mads Pedersen (DEN)	(Lidl–Trek)
	Third	Mathieu van der Poel (NED)	(Alpecin–Deceuninck)

The 2025 Tour of Flanders was a one-day cycling classic which took place on 6 April 2025. It was the 109th edition of the Tour of Flanders (men's race), and the 14th event of the 2025 UCI World Tour.

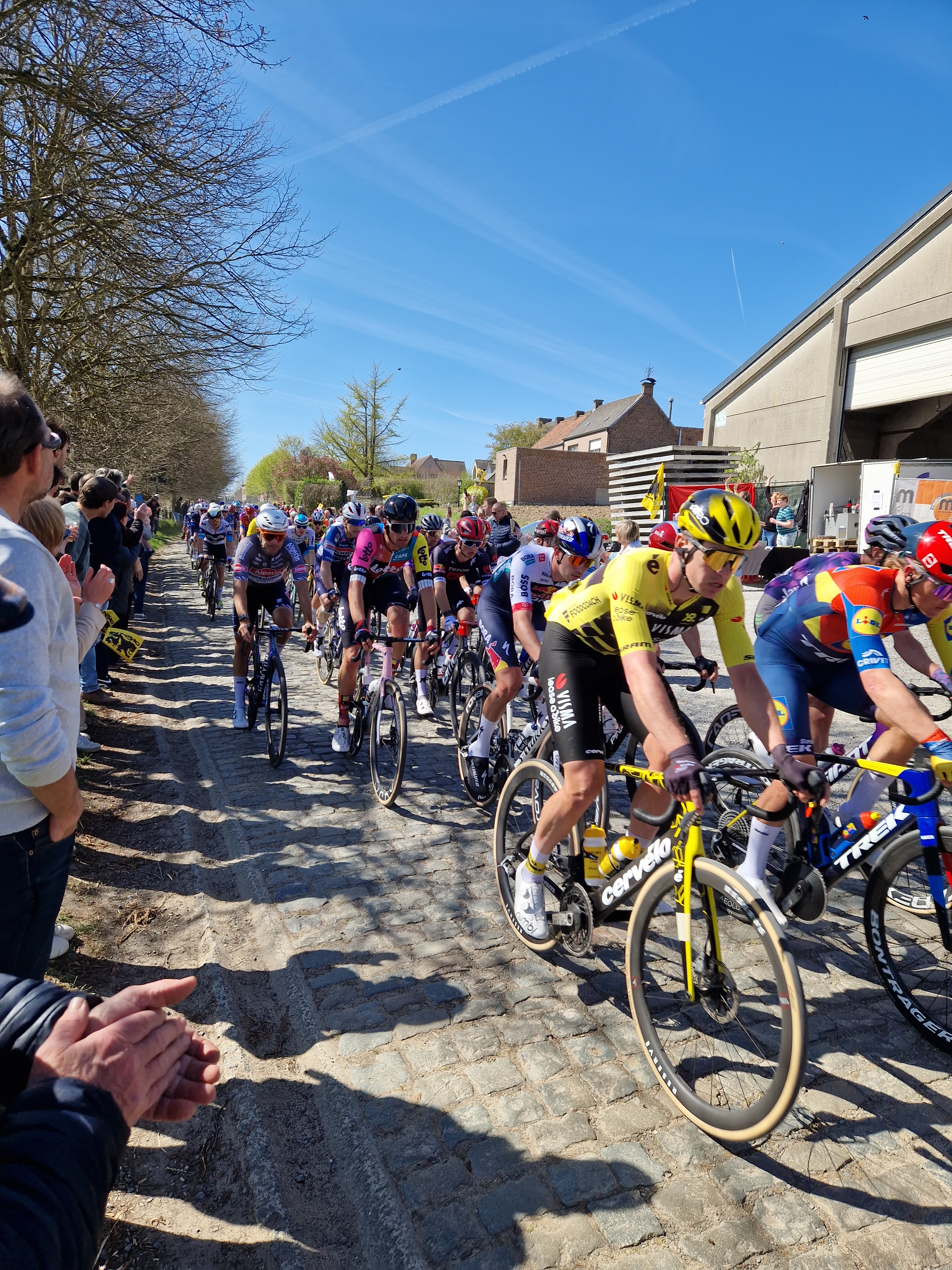
The peloton passing the cobbled Paddestraat.

The race was won by Tadej Pogačar of UAE Team Emirates XRG, his second victory at the race and eighth Monument win overall. Second place went to Mads Pedersen of Lidl–Trek, equalling his best finish at the race, while last year's winner, Mathieu van der Poel of Alpecin–Deceuninck, rounded out the podium. Like in 2022 and 2023, Pogačar made his first attack on the second ascent of Oude Kwaremont with 56 kilometers to go. He attacked several more times on the different cobbled climbs to pull a group clear that included himself, Pedersen, van der Poel, Wout van Aert, and Jasper Stuyven. On the final ascent of Oude Kwaremont with 19 kilometers to go, Pogačar proceeded to drop the others before soloing to the victory by more than a minute over the four chasers.

== Teams ==
All eighteen UCI WorldTeams and seven UCI ProTeams participated in the race. All teams entered a full squad of seven riders.

UCI WorldTeams

- Alpecin–Deceuninck
- Arkéa–B&B Hotels
- Cofidis
- Decathlon–AG2R La Mondiale
- EF Education–EasyPost
- Groupama–FDJ
- Ineos Grenadiers
- Intermarché–Wanty
- Lidl–Trek
- Movistar Team
- Red Bull–Bora–Hansgrohe
- Soudal–Quick-Step
- Team Bahrain Victorious
- Team Jayco–AlUla
- Team Picnic–PostNL
- UAE Team Emirates XRG
- Visma–Lease a Bike
- XDS Astana Team

UCI ProTeams

- Israel–Premier Tech
- Lotto
- Q36.5 Pro Cycling Team
- Team Flanders–Baloise
- Tudor Pro Cycling Team
- Uno-X Mobility
- Wagner Bazin WB

== Result ==
Result (1–10)
Rank	Rider	Team	Time
1	Tadej Pogačar (SLO)	UAE Team Emirates XRG	5h 58' 41"
2	Mads Pedersen (DEN)	Lidl–Trek	+ 1' 01"
3	Mathieu van der Poel (NED)	Alpecin–Deceuninck	+ 1' 01"
4	Wout van Aert (BEL)	Visma–Lease a Bike	+ 1' 01"
5	Jasper Stuyven (BEL)	Lidl–Trek	+ 1' 04"
6	Tiesj Benoot (BEL)	Visma–Lease a Bike	+ 1' 51"
7	Stefan Küng (SUI)	Groupama–FDJ	+ 1' 53"
8	Filippo Ganna (ITA)	Ineos Grenadiers	+ 2' 19"
9	Iván García Cortina (ESP)	Movistar Team	+ 2' 19"
10	Davide Ballerini (ITA)	XDS Astana Team	+ 2' 19"
