= 2026 Paris–Roubaix =

Cycling race

2026 Paris–Roubaix Hauts de France
2026 UCI World Tour, race 16 of 36
- Event poster, featuring 2025 winners Mathieu van der Poel and Pauline Ferrand-Prévot

Race details
- Dates: 12 April 2026
- Stages: 1
- Distance: 258.3 km (160.5 mi)
- Winning time: 5h 16' 52"

Results
	Winner	Wout van Aert (BEL)	(Visma–Lease a Bike)
	Second	Tadej Pogačar (SLO)	(UAE Team Emirates XRG)
	Third	Jasper Stuyven (BEL)	(Soudal–Quick-Step)

The 2026 Paris–Roubaix (officially Paris–Roubaix Hauts de France) was a road cycling one-day race that took place on 12 April 2026 in France. It was the 123rd edition of Paris–Roubaix and the 16th event of the 2026 UCI World Tour.

In early 2026, organisers of the race Amaury Sport Organisation (ASO) announced that both the men's and women's races would be sponsored by the Hauts-de-France region, taking the name as a subtitle.

The race was won by Belgian rider Wout van Aert of Visma–Lease a Bike, beating world champion Tadej Pogačar of UAE Team Emirates XRG in a sprint finish. It was van Aert's first win at Paris–Roubaix, and the first Belgian win since 2019. It was the fastest ever edition of the race, at an average speed of 48.91 kilometres per hour (30.39 mph), beating the record set during the 2024 edition.

== Route ==
The race started in Compiègne and finished on the velodrome in Roubaix after covering 258.3 kilometres (160.5 mi), with 54.8 kilometres (34.1 mi) of cobblestones (or pavé), spread out over 30 sectors. The early part of the route was changed, with organisers noting that the "first four sectors follow one another in quick succession, with almost no asphalt in between", and the fifth sector (Briastre) included an 800-metre (0.50 mi) climb. The final 20 sectors remained unchanged from previous editions, including three cobblestone sectors ranked as "five star" in difficulty – Trouée d'Arenberg, Mons-en-Pévèle and Carrefour de l'Arbre.

== Teams ==
All eighteen UCI WorldTeams and seven UCI ProTeams took part in the race.

UCI WorldTeams

- Alpecin–Premier Tech
- Decathlon CMA CGM
- EF Education–EasyPost
- Groupama–FDJ United
- INEOS Grenadiers
- Lotto–Intermarché
- Lidl–Trek
- Movistar Team
- NSN Cycling Team
- Red Bull–Bora–Hansgrohe
- Soudal–Quick-Step
- Team Bahrain Victorious
- Team Jayco–AlUla
- Team Picnic–PostNL
- UAE Team Emirates XRG
- Uno-X Mobility
- Visma–Lease a Bike
- XDS Astana Team

UCI ProTeams

- Cofidis
- Modern Adventure Pro Cycling
- Pinarello–Q36.5 Pro Cycling Team
- Team Flanders–Baloise
- Team TotalEnergies
- Tudor Pro Cycling Team
- Unibet Rose Rockets

== Result ==
Result
Rank	Rider	Team	Time
1	Wout van Aert (BEL)	Visma–Lease a Bike	5h 16' 52"
2	Tadej Pogačar (SLO)	UAE Team Emirates XRG	+ 0"
3	Jasper Stuyven (BEL)	Soudal–Quick-Step	+ 13"
4	Mathieu van der Poel (NED)	Alpecin–Premier Tech	+ 15"
5	Christophe Laporte (FRA)	Visma–Lease a Bike	+ 15"
6	Mick van Dijke (NED)	Red Bull–Bora–Hansgrohe	+ 15"
7	Mads Pedersen (DEN)	Lidl–Trek	+ 15"
8	Stefan Bissegger (SUI)	Decathlon CMA CGM	+ 20"
9	Nils Politt (GER)	UAE Team Emirates XRG	+ 2' 36"
10	Mike Teunissen (NED)	XDS Astana Team	+ 2' 36"
