= 2023 Hamburg Cyclassics =

Cycling race

2023 BEMER Cyclassics
2023 UCI World Tour, race 28 of 35

Race details
- Dates: 20 August 2023
- Stages: 1
- Distance: 205.6 km (127.8 mi)
- Winning time: 4h 36' 35"

Results
	Winner	Mads Pedersen (DEN)	(Lidl–Trek)
	Second	Danny van Poppel (NED)	(Bora–Hansgrohe)
	Third	Elia Viviani (ITA)	(Ineos Grenadiers)

The 2023 BEMER Cyclassics was a road cycling one-day race that took place on 20 August 2023 in Germany. It was the 25th edition of EuroEyes Cyclassics and the 28th event of the 2023 UCI World Tour. It was won by Mads Pedersen in the sprint.

== Teams ==
All eighteen UCI WorldTeams and three UCI ProTeams made up the twenty-one teams that participated in the race.

UCI WorldTeams

- AG2R Citroën Team
- Alpecin–Deceuninck
- Arkéa–Samsic
- Astana Qazaqstan Team
- Bora–Hansgrohe
- Cofidis
- EF Education–EasyPost
- Groupama–FDJ
- Ineos Grenadiers
- Intermarché–Circus–Wanty
- Lidl–Trek
- Movistar Team
- Soudal–Quick-Step
- Team dsm–firmenich
- Team Bahrain Victorious
- Team Jayco–AlUla
- Team Jumbo–Visma
- UAE Team Emirates

UCI ProTeams

- Israel–Premier Tech
- Lotto–Dstny
- Team TotalEnergies

== Result ==
Result
Rank	Rider	Team	Time
1	Mads Pedersen (DEN)	Lidl–Trek	4h 36’ 35"
2	Danny van Poppel (NED)	Bora–Hansgrohe	+ 0"
3	Elia Viviani (ITA)	Ineos Grenadiers	+ 0"
4	Arnaud Démare (FRA)	Arkéa–Samsic	+ 0"
5	Laurence Pithie (NZL)	Groupama–FDJ	+ 0"
6	Yves Lampaert (BEL)	Soudal–Quick-Step	+ 0"
7	Arnaud De Lie (BEL)	Lotto–Dstny	+ 0"
8	Nils Politt (GER)	Bora–Hansgrohe	+ 0"
9	Max Kanter (GER)	Movistar Team	+ 0"
10	Marc Hirschi (SUI)	UAE Team Emirates	+ 0"
