= Mads Pedersen =

Danish cyclist (born 1995)

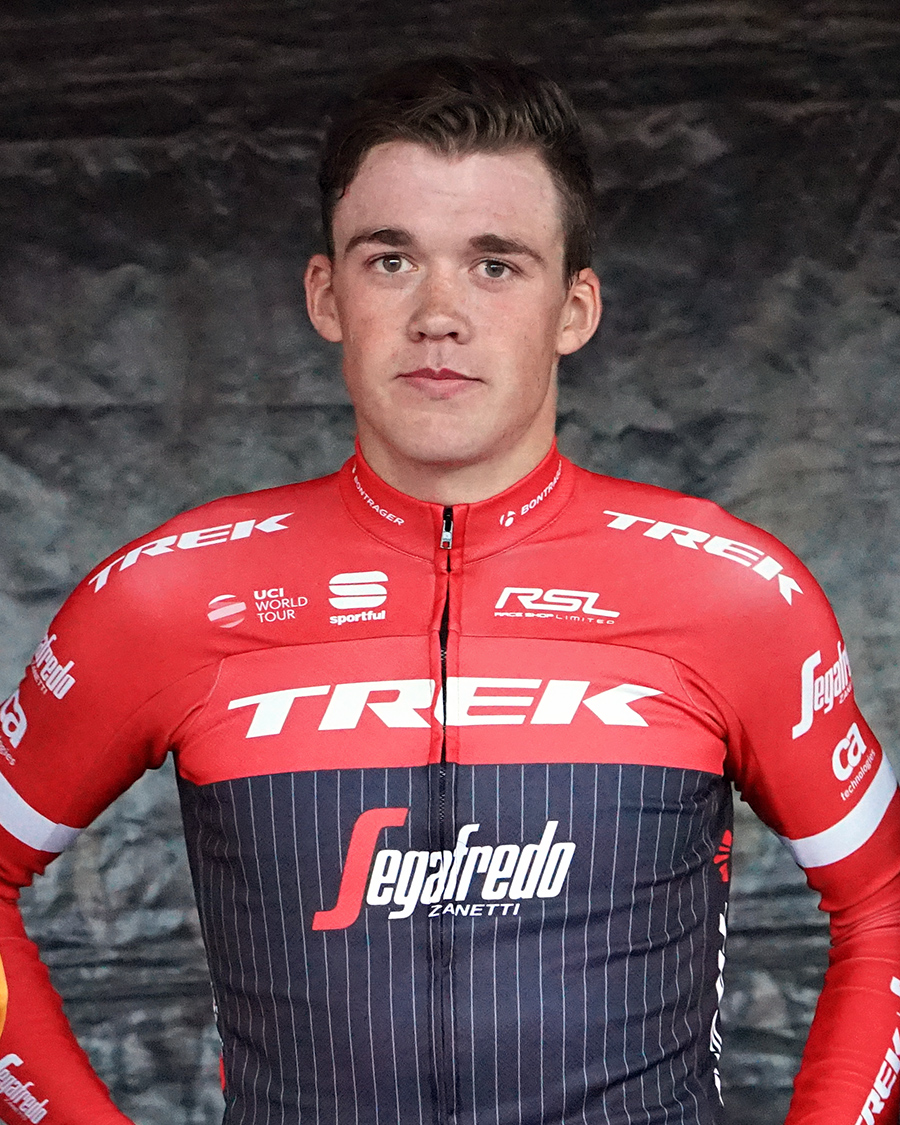
- Pedersen in 2017

Personal information
- Nickname: Mads P.
- Born: 18 December 1995 (age 30) Tølløse, Denmark
- Height: 1.79 m (5 ft 10 in)
- Weight: 70 kg (154 lb)

Cycling career
- Sport: Cycling
- Current team: Lidl–Trek
- Discipline: Road
- Role: Rider
- Rider type: Classics specialist; Sprinter

Professional teams
- 2014–2015: Cult Energy–Vital Water
- 2016: Stölting Service Group
- 2017–: Trek–Segafredo

Major wins
- Grand Tours Tour de France Points classification (2026) 3 individual stages (2022, 2023, 2026) Giro d'Italia Points classification (2025) 5 individual stages (2023, 2025) Vuelta a España Points classification (2022, 2025) 4 individual stages (2022, 2025) Stage races Danmark Rundt (2017, 2023, 2025) Deutschland Tour (2024) One-day races and Classics World Road Race Championships (2019) National Road Race Championships (2017) National Time Trial Championships (2025) Gent–Wevelgem (2020, 2024, 2025) Hamburg Cyclassics (2023) Kuurne–Brussels–Kuurne (2021) Tour de l'Eurométropole (2018)
Medal record
Representing Denmark
Men's road bicycle racing
World Championships
Gold medal – first place	2019 Harrogate	Elite road race
Silver medal – second place	2013 Florence	Junior road race

Mads Pedersen (born 18 December 1995) is a Danish professional racing cyclist who rides for UCI WorldTeam Lidl–Trek. Pedersen is the most winning Danish rider in history ranked by total number of professional victories, has won stages in all three Grand Tours—the Tour de France, Giro d'Italia, and Vuelta a España, and is the only Danish rider ever to win the men's road race world title, claiming the 2019 UCI Road World Championships in Yorkshire, England. Pedersen is also one of only six riders in history to have won the points classification in all three Grand Tours.

== Career ==
=== Amateur career: 2013–2016 ===
In 2013, Pedersen won the Paris–Roubaix Juniors and went on to claim the silver medal in the World Championships junior road race. Pedersen won Ghent–Wevelgem U23, the U23 Tour of Norway, and a stage of the Tour de l'Avenir prior to turning professional.

=== Early Trek–Segafredo years: 2017–2021 ===
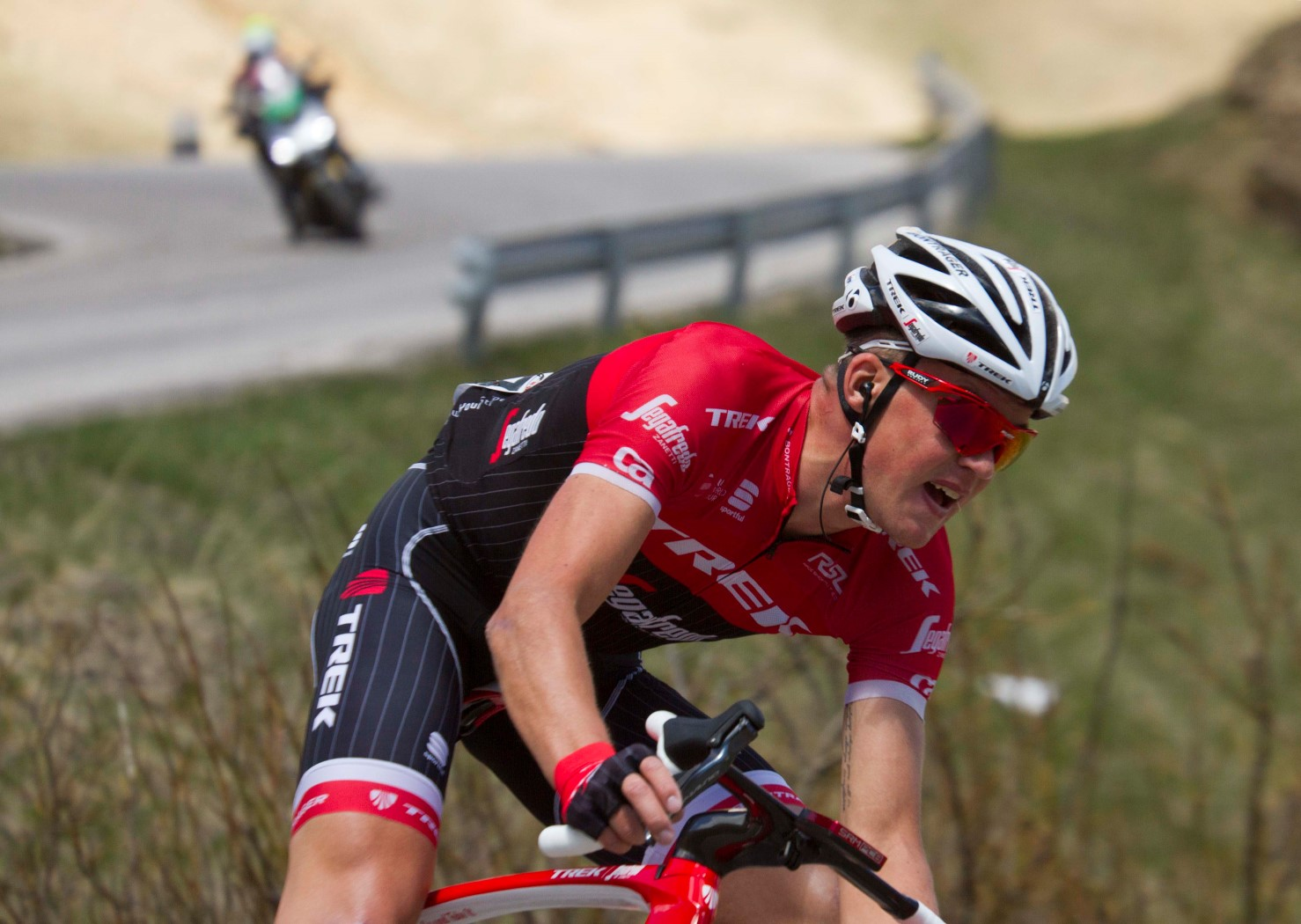
Pedersen at the 2017 Giro d'Italia

In August 2016, Trek–Segafredo announced that they had signed Pedersen through to 2018.

==== 2017 ====
In his neo-pro season, Pedersen was named in the start list for the Giro d'Italia. His best result was twelfth on the last stage, in the individual time trial.

Pedersen won the Danish national road race title in June. He took overall victory in the Tour du Poitou Charentes after winning the time trial.

In September, Pedersen won stage three of Danmark Rundt. He won the general, youth, and points classification.

==== 2018 ====
At Dwars door Vlaanderen, Pedersen finished fifth, in a group two seconds behind winner, Yves Lampaert.

Pedersen finished in second place in the Tour of Flanders following a break away. Pedersen attacked ahead of the Koppenberg with just over 50 km remaining, and was joined by Dylan van Baarle and Sebastian Langeveld. Eventual winner Niki Terpstra caught and passed Pedersen on the final ascent of the Oude Kwaremont and rode to victory, but Pedersen was strong enough to hold off world champion Peter Sagan and the chasing peloton to become the youngest podium finisher in 40 years.

Pedersen won the one-day race Fyen Rundt, saying that "this is [...] a team victory, the whole team was racing amazing today". Pedersen returned to the Danmark Rundt in defense of his title, but lost time on stage two to eventual winner, Wout van Aert. He won the individual time trial on stage four. He came ninth in the points classification. Towards the end of the season, Pedersen won the Tour de l'Eurométropole.

Pedersen signed a contract extension with Trek-Segafredo, until 2020.

==== 2019 ====
Pedersen won Grand Prix d'Isbergues from a 12 km solo, in rainy conditions.

On 29 September, Pedersen won the UCI Road World Championships in a rain-soaked race, in and around Harrogate, in Yorkshire, England. He was the first Danish cyclist to win a men's world championship road race title. It was only his second win of the season.

==== 2020 ====
At the start of the season, Pedersen extended his contract with Trek-Segafredo until 2022.

Pedersen won stage two of the Tour of Poland, from a sprint. He dedicated his victory to Fabio Jakobsen, who was involved in a serious crash the day before, saying "[I wish] him a fast recovery, a comeback to life, to cycling".

In August, he was named in the startlist for the postponed 2020 Tour de France. He came second on stage one to Alexander Kristoff, and wore the white jersey for best young rider for one day. Pedersen came fifth and sixth on sprint stages ten and eleven. He took another second place on the final stage, to Sam Bennett on the Champs-Élysées avenue.

Pedersen came second on the first stage of the 2020 BinckBank Tour. He won stage three, which was rerouted due to a surge of COVID-19 cases in the Netherlands. Pedersen won the overall points classification.

Pedersen won the 2020 Gent–Wevelgem, bridging to the leading group of riders which contained Alberto Bettiol, Matteo Trentin, and Florian Sénéchal, before sprinting clear.

==== 2021 ====
Pedersen came third on the first stage of Étoile de Bessèges, after a late attack from eventual winner Christophe Laporte and Nacer Bouhanni. Pedersen won Kuurne-Brussels-Kuurne from the bunch sprint.

At Paris-Nice, Pedersen finished third and second on sprint stages one and two respectively. He finished eighth in the overall points classification. Pedersen was part of the breakaway at the Bredene Koksijde Classic. He finished second to Tim Merlier in the sprint. At the Critérium du Dauphiné, Pedersen was involved in a crash with Santiago Buitrago, and per the team's concussion protocols, he abandoned the race.

Pedersen was selected for the Tour de France. His highest result was an eighth place on stage four, in a bunch sprint. He crashed four separate times.

At the Tour of Denmark, Pedersen finished in the top ten in all stages. His best result was a win on stage two. He finished second in the general classification and won the points classification. Pedersen won stage three of the Tour of Norway from a reduced bunch sprint. He finished second on stage four, and came sixth in the points classification.

Pedersen crashed out of the wet Paris-Roubaix, which was postponed due to COVID-19, after riding into the back of Luke Rowe, who had a front wheel puncture on the Trouée d'Arenberg sector.

=== Grand Tour victories: 2022–present ===
==== 2022 ====
Pedersen won the points classification in Circuit de la Sarthe and Étoile de Bessèges and had top 10 finishes in Milan–San Remo, the Tour of Flanders and Gent–Wevelgem.

During the 2022 Tour de France he was active early in the race as the Grand Départ was held in Denmark, however he had no success. At the end of the second week he was involved in a seven-rider breakaway with teammate Quinn Simmons. Simmons drove a hard pace up the Coté de Saint-Romain-en-Gal and with just under 11 km to go Pedersen launched an attack. Only Fred Wright and Hugo Houle could go with him. At the finish line, Pedersen outsprinted both of them to claim the stage win.

He had a strong 2022 Vuelta a España, winning the points competition as well as three individual stages.

==== 2023 ====
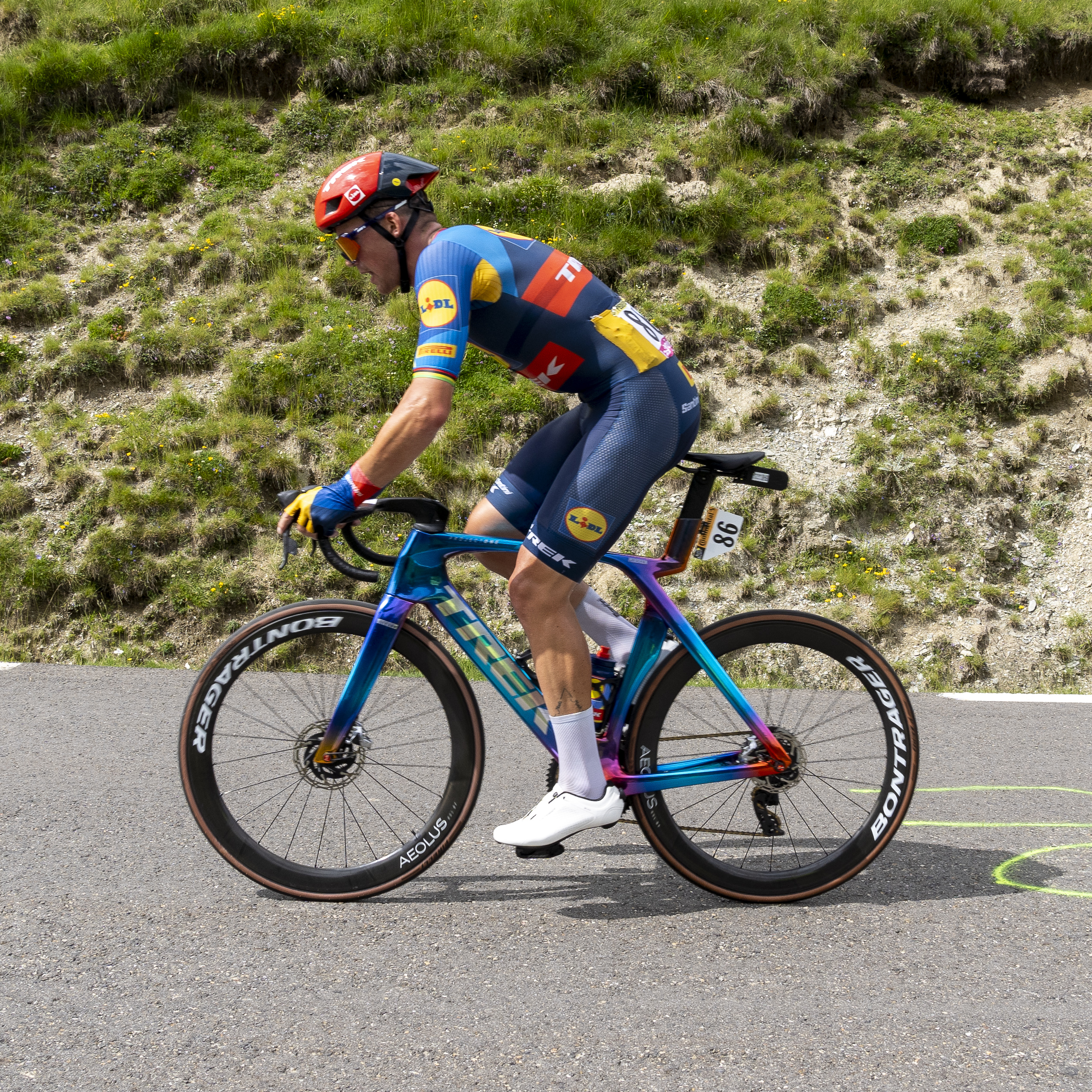
Pedersen at the 2023 Tour de France

Pedersen started his 2023 campaign with stage wins at the Étoile de Bessèges and Paris–Nice. He again took multiple top 5 and 10 finishes in the spring classics, but had no victories. In May, he won stage six of the Giro d'Italia in a sprint finish, after finishing on the podium on stages three and five. In July, he won stage eight of the Tour de France, finishing second overall to Jasper Philipsen in the points classification. In August, he narrowly missed out on a medal in the World Road Race Championships, losing the sprint for third to Tadej Pogačar. He took two more victories in the remainder of the season, winning stage five and the overall title of the Danmark Rundt, followed by the Hamburg Cyclassics.

==== 2024 ====
Pedersen started the season by taking a stage win and the overall of Étoile de Bessèges, followed by three stage wins and the overall title at the Tour de la Provence. In March, he took two second-place finishes on stage of Paris–Nice, followed by fourth at Milan–San Remo. He ended his drought of classics wins, sprinting to take Gent–Wevelgem. In early April, he finished third at Paris–Roubaix, behind Philipsen and van der Poel.

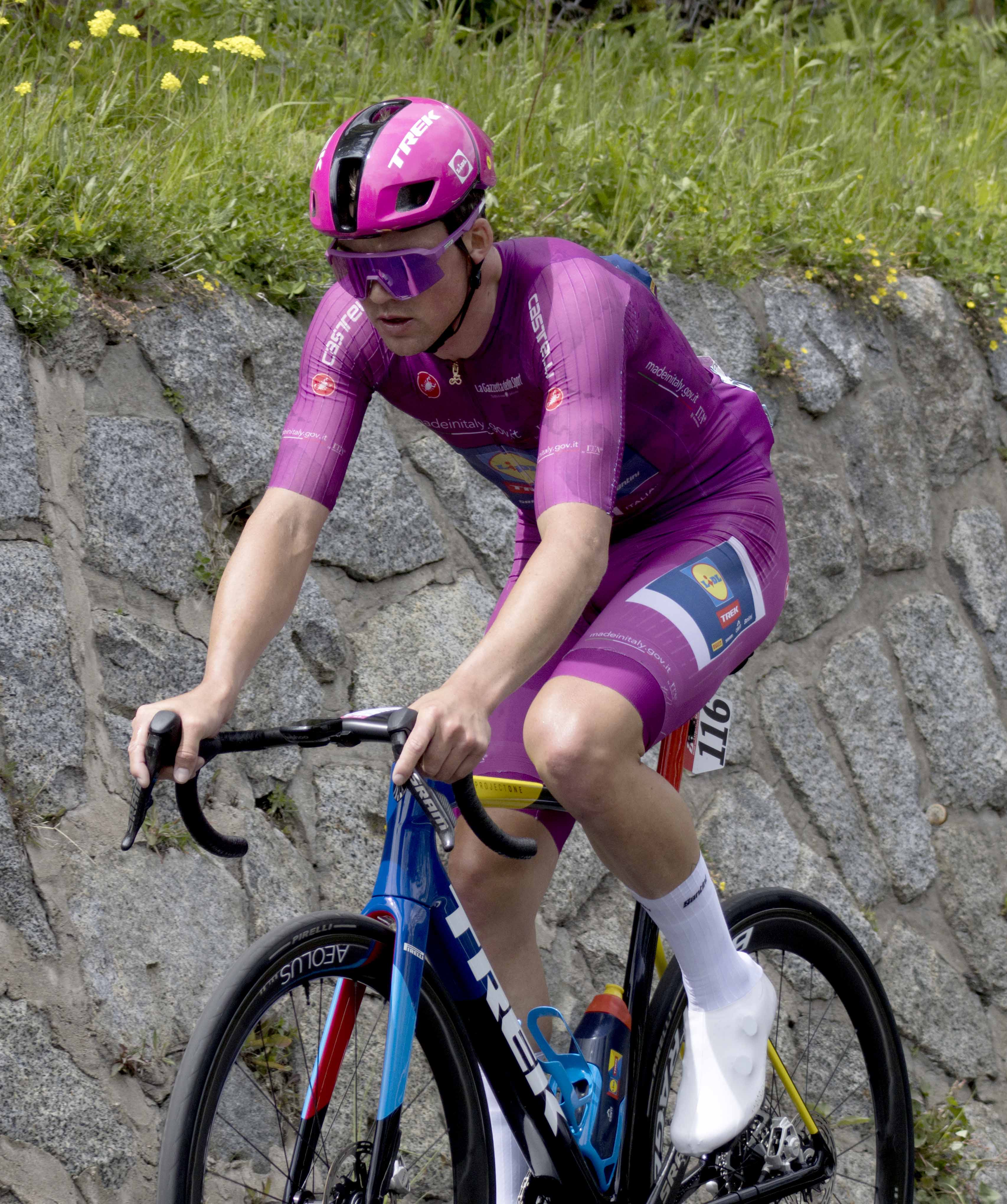
Pedersen wearing the Maglia ciclamino at the 2025 Giro d'Italia

==== 2025 ====
Pedersen won stage two of Tour de la Provence, out-sprinting Matej Mohorič. He won the general classification and the points classification.

At Paris-Nice, Pedersen won stage six in the sprint, from a group of seventeen riders, the formed due to echelons. He won the points classification.

Pedersen had a strong spring classics season. He came seventh in Milan-San Remo. He finished second to Mathieu van der Poel in E3 Saxo Classic, over one minute behind him. Pedersen won Gent-Wevelgem for the third time, after a solo of 55 km, saying "it could have been a stupid move, but [..] it wasn't [...], in the end I'm just happy I could finish it off and win the race".

Pedersen finished fifth at Dwars door Vlaanderen. At the 109th edition of the Tour of Flanders, Pedersen outsprinted a four-man group of Wout van Aert, Mathieu van der Poel, and Jasper Stuyven to finish second. At Paris-Roubaix, Pedersen finished third, ahead of Wout van Aert and Florian Vermeersch in the sprint.

He had a successful 2025 Giro d'Italia, winning stages one, three, five, and thirteen. He wore the maglia rosa for five days. He also won the points competition. During the race, Pedersen announced that he had committed to racing for Lidl-Trek for the remainder of his career.

Pedersen continued his successes in winning the time trial at the Danish National Championships, and finishing second in the road race.

At the 2025 Danmark Rundt, Pedersen won stages one, four, and five. Stages one and five were won from sprints, and stage four came from a 30 km solo. He won the general and the points classification.

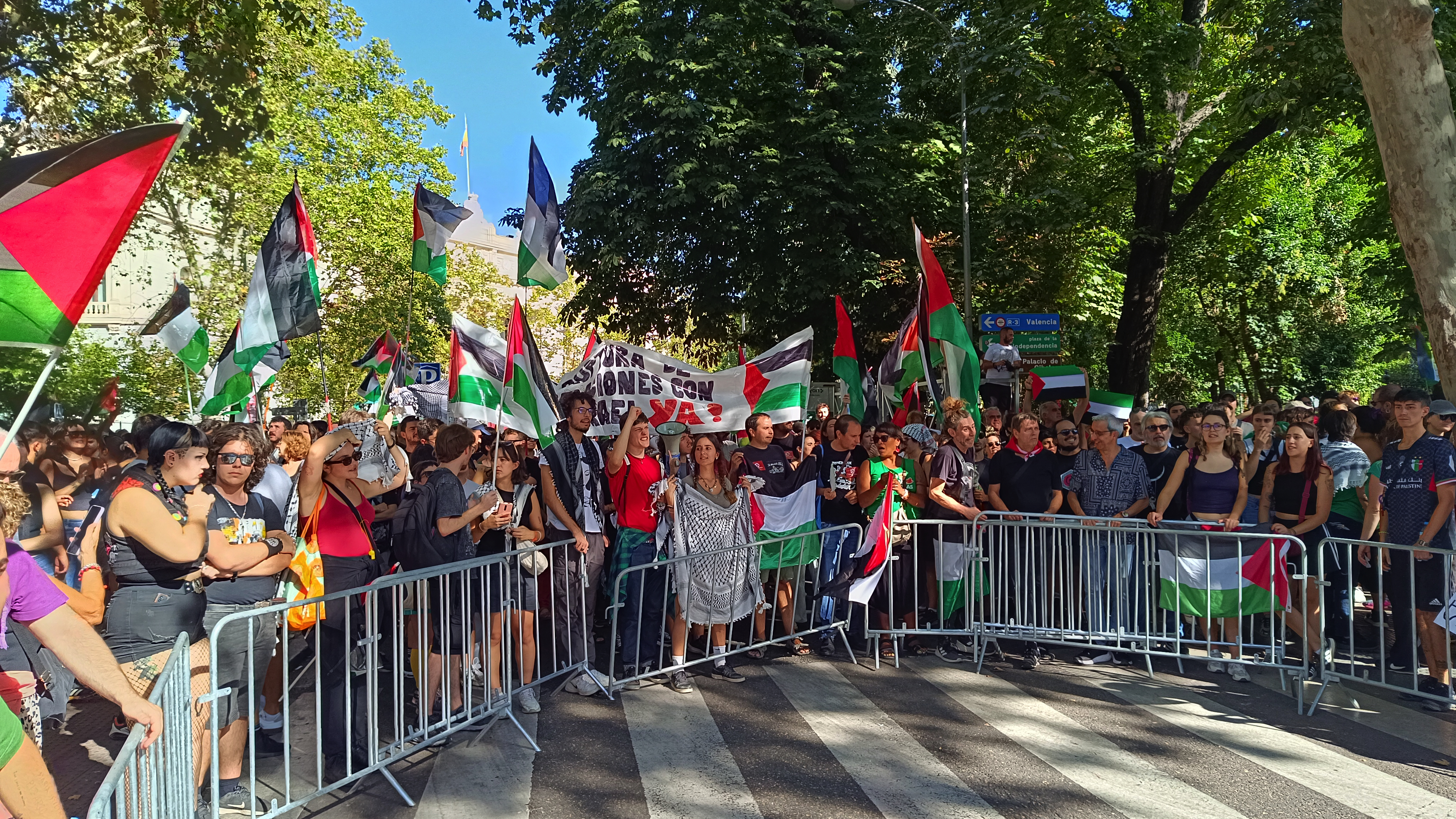
Protests boycotting Israel at the final stage of the 2025 Vuelta a España

Pedersen was not selected for the 2025 Tour de France, to instead allow pure sprinter Jonathan Milan full support for stage victories. It was announced the Pedersen would compete at the Vuelta a España and return to the next edition of the Tour. At the Vuelta, Pedersen came in the top ten on stages three, four, five, eight, and twelve, before eventually winning stage fifteen. He won the sprint from the breakaway, where he had four teammates to help him. He also came second on stage nineteen, to Jasper Philipsen. The final stage was abandoned with 60 km to go, due to pro-Palestine protestors that had entered parts of the course, and the organisers cancelled the podium ceremony because of safety concerns. An alternative podium ceremony was organised in a car park. Pedersen won the points classification.

Pedersen came fifteenth in the time trial at the European Road Cycling Championships.

==== 2026 ====
In his first race of the season, the Volta Comunitat Valencia, Pedersen was involved in a high-speed crash and fractured his wrist and collarbone. The injury required surgery, and he was expected to miss several months.

Pedersen returned to racing at Milan-San Remo, only six weeks after surgery. He finished fourth overall. In preparation for the Tour of Flanders, he raced the E3 Saxo Classic and finished ninth. He also raced Dwars door Vlaanderen, and finished tenth.

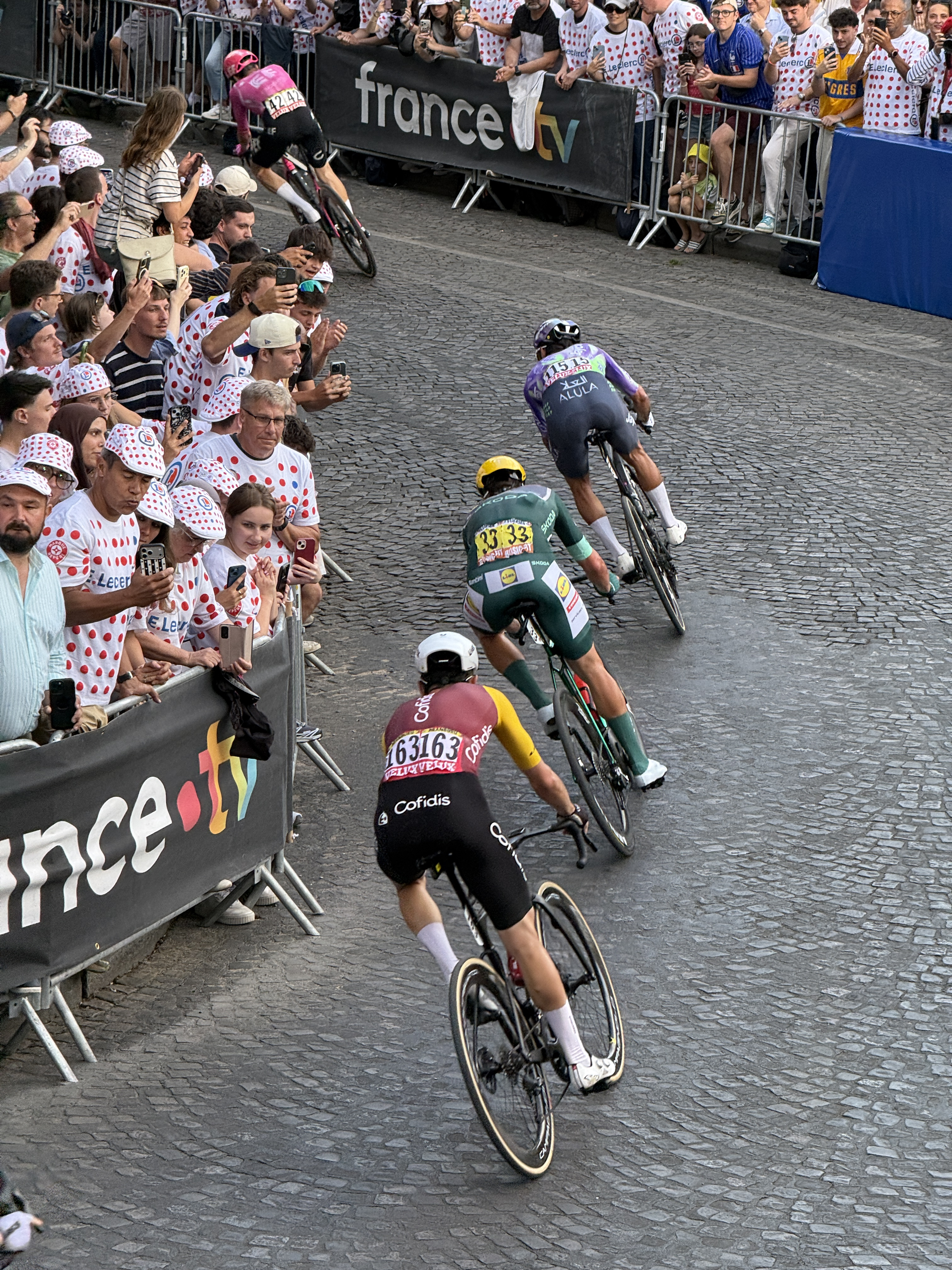
Pedersen (middle) on stage 21 of the 2026 Tour de France.

At the Tour of Flanders, when the race was split by Florian Vermeersch, Pedersen made it into a group of favourites. On the second ascent of the Oude Kwaremont, Tadej Pogačar attacked, with only Mathieu van der Poel and Remco Evenepoel able to follow. Pedersen and Wout van Aert were dropped. He worked with van Aert, who eventually dropped him on the final ascent of the Kwaremont. Pedersen finished in fifth place.

Ahead of Paris-Roubaix, Pedersen said "I'm just happy to be here. [...] To be back racing, and still placing in the top five at the two Monuments [so far] this year, we can't complain too much." At the race, he suffered an early puncture, but managed to go clear with Pogačar and van Aert, after van der Poel suffered a mechanical and bike change on the Trouée d’Arenberg. He was distanced when Pogačar and van Aert started attacking. Pedersen finished seventh, only 15 seconds behind the winner, Wout van Aert.

Pedersen was selected for the 2026 Tour de France. He won stage four, in a sprint from the breakaway. His teammates, Quinn Simmons and Mathias Vacek, also finished in the top ten, second and tenth respectively. Pedersen mathematically secured the green jersey on stage twenty, saying that "one of my career goals is now accomplished". Pedersen joins an elite group of cyclists who have won the points classification at least once in each grand tour, such as Eddy Merckx, and Mark Cavendish.

Pedersen was selected for the Vuelta a España. He finished second on stage eight, in a reduced group that was formed by a crash in the last kilometre. Pedersen did not start stage eleven due to illness.

Ahead of the 2026 UCI Road World Championships, Pedersen helped raise funds for two under-23 riders to participate in the race, through auctioning his kit from the Tour de France, in which he won the green jersey. Pedersen raced the elite race, finishing sixth, despite only making it back to the front group in the last lap.

== Personal life ==
Pedersen has a brother, Martin, who is also a professional cyclist. In 2019, he married Lisette. They live together in Monaco.

Pedersen has a podcast called Lang Distance with another professional cyclist, Jakob Egholm.

== Major results ==
2012
1st Overall Tour of Istria

1st Young rider classification
1st Stage 3

1st Overall Trofeo Karlsberg

1st Young rider classification
1st Stage 3a (ITT)

1st Overall Sint-Martinusprijs Kontich

1st Points classification
1st Young rider classification
1st Prologue & Stage 4

3rd Overall Liège–La Gleize
4th Overall Course de la Paix Juniors
10th Paris–Roubaix Juniors
2013
1st Overall Course de la Paix Juniors

1st Points classification
1st Stages 2a (ITT) & 4

1st Overall Trofeo Karlsberg

1st Stages 3a (ITT), 3b & 4

1st Paris–Roubaix Juniors
Aubel–Thimister–La Gleize

1st Mountains classification
1st Stage 3

2nd Road race, UCI Junior Road World Championships
2nd Road race, National Junior Road Championships
2nd Overall Sint-Martinusprijs Kontich

1st Stage 4

2nd Overall Grand Prix Rüebliland

1st Stage 4

10th Overall Giro della Lunigiana

1st Stage 4

2014
1st Eschborn-Frankfurt City Loop U23
3rd Time trial, National Under-23 Road Championships
2015
1st Stage 2 Tour de l'Avenir
2nd Overall ZLM Roompot Tour

1st Stages 2 (TTT) & 3

6th Overall Four Days of Dunkirk
6th La Côte Picarde
8th Overall Tour des Fjords
9th Ronde van Vlaanderen Beloften
2016 (1 pro win)
1st Fyen Rundt
1st Kattekoers
Tour of Norway

1st Mountains classification
1st Stage 3

5th Road race, National Road Championships
7th Poreč Trophy
8th Overall Three Days of De Panne

1st Young rider classification

2017 (5)
1st Road race, National Road Championships
1st Overall Danmark Rundt

1st Points classification
1st Young rider classification
1st Stage 3

1st Overall Tour du Poitou-Charentes

1st Young rider classification
1st Stage 4 (ITT)

2018 (4)
1st Tour de l'Eurométropole
1st Fyen Rundt
1st Stage 2 Herald Sun Tour
1st Stage 4 (ITT) Danmark Rundt
2nd Tour of Flanders
5th Dwars door Vlaanderen
7th GP Horsens
2019 (2)
1st Road race, UCI Road World Championships
1st Grand Prix d'Isbergues
2020 (3)
1st Gent–Wevelgem
1st Stage 2 Tour de Pologne
4th Road race, National Road Championships
5th Overall BinckBank Tour

1st Points classification
1st Stage 3

7th Race Torquay
Tour de France

Held after Stage 1

2021 (3)
1st Kuurne–Brussels–Kuurne
1st Stage 3 Tour of Norway
2nd Overall Danmark Rundt

1st Points classification
1st Stage 2

2nd Bredene Koksijde Classic
3rd Eurométropole Tour
2022 (9)
1st Fyen Rundt
Vuelta a España

1st Points classification
1st Stages 13, 16 & 19

Tour de France

1st Stage 13
Combativity award Stage 13

Circuit de la Sarthe

1st Points classification
1st Stages 1 & 3

Étoile de Bessèges

1st Points classification
1st Stage 1

1st Stage 3 Paris–Nice
National Road Championships

2nd Road race
4th Time trial

2nd Grand Prix La Marseillaise
3rd GP Herning
6th Milan–San Remo
7th Overall Tour of Belgium

1st Points classification
1st Stage 1

7th Gent–Wevelgem
8th Tour of Flanders
10th Road race, UEC European Road Championships
2023 (7)
1st Overall Danmark Rundt

1st Points classification
1st Stage 5 (ITT)

1st Hamburg Cyclassics
1st Stage 8 Tour de France
1st Stage 6 Giro d'Italia
1st Stage 2 Paris–Nice
1st Stage 5 (ITT) Étoile de Bessèges
2nd Grand Prix d'Isbergues
3rd Tour of Flanders
3rd Münsterland Giro
4th Road race, UCI Road World Championships
4th Paris–Roubaix
5th Gent–Wevelgem
5th Dwars door Vlaanderen
6th Milan–San Remo
7th Road race, UEC European Road Championships
2024 (12)
1st Overall Deutschland Tour

1st Stage 2 & 4

1st Overall Tour de la Provence

1st Points classification
1st Prologue, Stages 1 & 2

1st Overall Étoile de Bessèges

1st Points classification
1st Stage 3

1st Gent–Wevelgem
1st Stage 1 Critérium du Dauphiné
1st Stage 2 Tour de Luxembourg
3rd Paris–Roubaix
4th Milan–San Remo
6th Road race, UEC European Road Championships
Combativity award Stage 6 Tour de France
2025 (14)
National Road Championships

1st Time trial
2nd Road race

1st Overall Danmark Rundt

1st Points classification
1st Stages 1, 4 & 5

1st Overall Tour de la Provence

1st Points classification
1st Stage 2

1st Gent–Wevelgem
Giro d'Italia

1st Points classification
1st Stages 1, 3, 5 & 13
Held after Stages 1 & 3–6

Vuelta a España

1st Points classification
1st Stage 15
Combativity award Stage 12

Paris–Nice

1st Points classification
1st Stage 6

2nd Tour of Flanders
2nd E3 Saxo Classic
3rd Paris–Roubaix
5th Dwars door Vlaanderen
7th Milan–San Remo
2026 (1)
Tour de France

1st Points classification
1st Stage 4
Combativity award Stage 17

4th Milan–San Remo
5th Road race, National Road Championships
5th Tour of Flanders
6th Road race, UCI Road World Championships
7th Paris–Roubaix
9th E3 Saxo Classic
10th Dwars door Vlaanderen

=== Grand Tour general classification results timeline ===
Grand Tour	2017	2018	2019	2020	2021	2022	2023	2024	2025	2026
Giro d'Italia	138	140	—	—	—	—	DNF	—	90	—
Tour de France	—	—	—	124	137	98	105	DNF	—	80
Vuelta a España	—	—	—	—	—	102	—	—	125	

=== Classics results timeline ===
Monument	2015	2016	2017	2018	2019	2020	2021	2022	2023	2024	2025	2026
Milan–San Remo	—	—	—	—	—	—	—	6	6	4	7	4
Tour of Flanders	—	—	—	2	DNF	59	DNF	8	3	22	2	5
Paris–Roubaix	—	—	95	71	51	NH	DNF	DNF	4	3	3	7
Liège–Bastogne–Liège	—	—	—	—	—	DNF	—	—	—	—	—	—
Giro di Lombardia	Has not contested during his career											
Classic	2015	2016	2017	2018	2019	2020	2021	2022	2023	2024	2025	2026
Omloop Het Nieuwsblad	DNF	39	DNF	92	105	66	112	—	—	—	—	—
Kuurne–Brussels–Kuurne	—	—	—	81	DNF	79	1	—	—	—	—	—
Strade Bianche	—	—	DNF	DNF	—	—	—	—	—	—	—	—
E3 Harelbeke	—	—	90	DNF	DNF	NH	DNF	24	14	11	2	9
Gent–Wevelgem	—	—	—	DNF	33	1	—	7	5	1	1	—
Dwars door Vlaanderen	DNF	15	150	5	89	NH	—	69	5	DNF	5	10
Scheldeprijs	160	—	DNF	—	101	DNF	—	—	—	—	—	—
Hamburg Cyclassics	—	123	126	—	15	Not held		—	1	—	—	

=== Major championships timeline ===
Event		2014	2015	2016	2017	2018	2019	2020	2021	2022	2023	2024	2025	2026
World Championships	Road race	—	—	—	DNF	—	1	—	DNF	—	4	13	—	6
European Championships	Road race	DNE		—	—	DNF	24	—	—	10	7	6	DNS	
National Championships	Road race	—	52	5	1	6	16	4	38	2	14	8	2	5
National Championships	Time trial	25	11	15	13	—	10	—	—	4	—	—	1	7

Legend
—	Did not compete
DNF	Did not finish
DNS	Did not start
NH	Not held
