= 2026 Dwars door Vlaanderen =

Cycling race

2026 UCI World Tour, race 13 of 36
- Event poster with previous winners Neilson Powless and Elisa Longo Borghini

Race details
- Stages: 1
- Winning time: 3h 48' 27"

Results
	Winner	Filippo Ganna (ITA)	(INEOS Grenadiers)
	Second	Wout van Aert (BEL)	(Visma–Lease a Bike)
	Third	Søren Wærenskjold (NOR)	(Uno-X Mobility)

The 2026 Dwars door Vlaanderen was a road cycling one-day race that took place on 1 April 2026, starting in Roeselare and finishing in Waregem, both in West Flanders. This was the 80th edition of Dwars door Vlaanderen and the 13th event of the 2026 UCI World Tour. The race was won by Italian rider Filippo Ganna of INEOS Grenadiers in a sprint finish.

== Teams ==
Twenty-five teams participated in the race, including all eighteen UCI WorldTeams and seven UCI ProTeams. Neilson Powless, who won in 2025, was not on the EF Education–EasyPost roster.

UCI WorldTeams

- Alpecin–Premier Tech
- Decathlon CMA CGM
- EF Education–EasyPost
- Groupama–FDJ United
- INEOS Grenadiers
- Lotto–Intermarché
- Lidl–Trek
- Movistar Team
- NSN Cycling Team
- Red Bull–Bora–Hansgrohe
- Soudal–Quick-Step
- Team Bahrain Victorious
- Team Jayco–AlUla
- Team Picnic–PostNL
- UAE Team Emirates XRG
- Uno-X Mobility
- Visma–Lease a Bike
- XDS Astana Team

UCI ProTeams

- Burgos Burpellet BH
- Cofidis
- Pinarello–Q36.5 Pro Cycling Team
- Team Flanders–Baloise
- Team TotalEnergies
- Tudor Pro Cycling Team
- Unibet Rose Rockets

== Result ==
Result (1–10)
Rank	Rider	Team	Time
1	Filippo Ganna (ITA)	INEOS Grenadiers	3h 48' 27"
2	Wout van Aert (BEL)	Visma–Lease a Bike	+ 0"
3	Søren Wærenskjold (NOR)	Uno-X Mobility	+ 0"
4	Biniam Girmay (ERI)	NSN Cycling Team	+ 0"
5	Laurence Pithie (NZL)	Red Bull–Bora–Hansgrohe	+ 0"
6	Orluis Aular (VEN)	Movistar Team	+ 0"
7	Christophe Laporte (FRA)	Visma–Lease a Bike	+ 0"
8	Jasper Philipsen (BEL)	Alpecin–Premier Tech	+ 0"
9	Vito Braet (BEL)	Lotto–Intermarché	+ 0"
10	Mads Pedersen (DEN)	Lidl–Trek	+ 0"
