= 2018 Dwars door Vlaanderen =

Cycling race

2018 UCI World Tour, race 12 of 37
- Event poster with previous winner Yves Lampaert

Race details
- Dates: 28 March 2018
- Stages: 1
- Distance: 180.1 km (111.9 mi)
- Winning time: 4h 09' 40"

Results
	Winner	Yves Lampaert (BEL)	(Quick-Step Floors)
	Second	Mike Teunissen (NED)	(Team Sunweb)
	Third	Sep Vanmarcke (BEL)	(EF Education First–Drapac p/b Cannondale)

The 2018 Dwars door Vlaanderen was a road cycling one-day race that took place on 28 March 2018 in Belgium. It was the 73rd edition of Dwars door Vlaanderen and the twelfth event of the 2018 UCI World Tour. It was won for the second year in a row by Yves Lampaert (Quick-Step Floors) – becoming the first rider to win the race in consecutive years. He finished two seconds ahead of Team Sunweb's Mike Teunissen and Sep Vanmarcke, riding for the EF Education First–Drapac p/b Cannondale team, completed the podium.

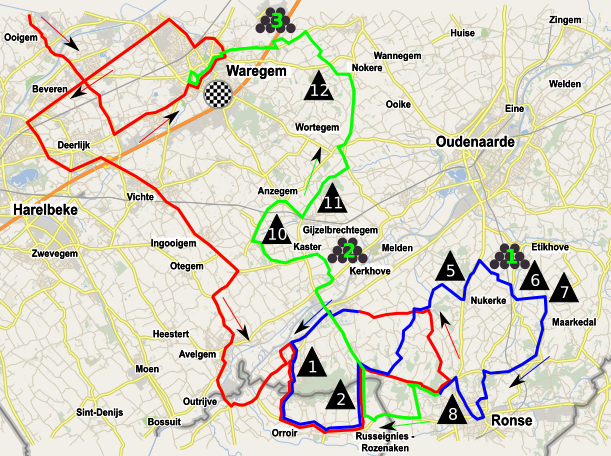
Route of the 2018 Dwars door Vlaanderen

== Teams ==
As the race was only added to the UCI World Tour calendar in 2017, all UCI WorldTeams were invited to the race, but not obligated to compete in the race. As such, seventeen of the eighteen WorldTeams – with the exception of Groupama–FDJ – competed in the race, up one on 2017. Eight UCI Professional Continental teams competed, completing the 25-team peloton.

UCI WorldTeams

- AG2R La Mondiale
- Astana
- Bahrain–Merida
- BMC Racing Team
- Bora–Hansgrohe
- Team Dimension Data
- EF Education First–Drapac p/b Cannondale
- Team Katusha–Alpecin
- LottoNL–Jumbo
- Lotto–Soudal
- Mitchelton–Scott
- Movistar Team
- Quick-Step Floors
- Team Sky
- Team Sunweb
- Trek–Segafredo
- UAE Team Emirates

UCI Professional Continental teams

- Aqua Blue Sport
- Cofidis
- Direct Énergie
- Israel Cycling Academy
- Sport Vlaanderen–Baloise
- Vérandas Willems–Crelan
- Wanty–Groupe Gobert
- WB Aqua Protect Veranclassic

== Route ==
The race was 180.1 kilometres (111.9 miles) in length. There were 12 categorised climbs:

Climbs and cobbled sections in the 2018 Dwars door Vlaanderen
No.	Name	Distance from		Surface	Length (metres)	Gradient (%)	
No.	Name	Start (km)	Finish (km)	Surface	Length (metres)	(ave.)	(max.)
1	Kluisberg	82.6	97.5	asphalt	1000	6.8%	16%
2	Côte de Trieu	90.0	90.1	asphalt	1900	4.9%	11.8%
3	Kluisberg	107.3	72.8	asphalt	1000	6.8%	16%
4	Côte de Trieu	114.8	65.3	asphalt	1900	4.9%	11.8%
5	Kortekeer	122.4	57.7	asphalt	900	6.5%	9.8%
–	Mariaborrestraat	124.5	55.6	cobbles	2400	—	
6	Steenbeekdries	125.7	54.4	cobbles	600	4.5%	8%
7	Taaienberg	128.2	51.9	cobbles	530	6.6%	15.8%
8	Kruisberg	138.3	41.8	cobbles	1800	4.8%	9%
9	Côte de Trieu	147.0	33.1	asphalt	1900	4.9%	11.8%
–	Varentstraat	154.4	25.7	cobbles	2000	—	
10	Tiegemberg	159.2	20.9	asphalt	1400	6.5%	9%
11	Holstraat	163.6	16.5	asphalt	1000	5.2%	12%
12	Nokereberg	171.1	9.0	cobbles	500	5.7%	6.7%
–	Herlegemstraat	173.9	6.2	cobbles	800	—	

== Result ==
Result
Rank	Rider	Team	Time
1	Yves Lampaert (BEL)	Quick-Step Floors	4h 09' 40"
2	Mike Teunissen (NED)	Team Sunweb	+ 2"
3	Sep Vanmarcke (BEL)	EF Education First–Drapac p/b Cannondale	+ 2"
4	Edvald Boasson Hagen (NOR)	Team Dimension Data	+ 2"
5	Mads Pedersen (DEN)	Trek–Segafredo	+ 2"
6	Zdeněk Štybar (CZE)	Quick-Step Floors	+ 29"
7	Tiesj Benoot (BEL)	Lotto–Soudal	+ 30"
8	Greg Van Avermaet (BEL)	BMC Racing Team	+ 59"
9	Niki Terpstra (NED)	Quick-Step Floors	+ 59"
10	Jasper Stuyven (BEL)	Trek–Segafredo	+ 59"
