= 2021 Kuurne–Brussels–Kuurne =

2021 UCI Europe Tour 2021 UCI ProSeries

Race details
- Dates: 28 February 2021
- Stages: 1
- Distance: 197 km (122 mi)
- Winning time: 4h 37' 08"

Results
| | Winner | Mads Pedersen (DEN) | (Trek–Segafredo) |
| | Second | Anthony Turgis (FRA) | (Total Direct Énergie) |
| | Third | Tom Pidcock (GBR) | (INEOS Grenadiers) |

The 2021 Kuurne–Brussels–Kuurne was the 73rd edition of the Kuurne–Brussels–Kuurne cycling classic. It was held on 28 February 2021 as a category 1.Pro race on the 2021 UCI Europe Tour and the 2021 UCI ProSeries. The race was 197 km (122 mi) long, starting and finishing in Kuurne, and featured several cobbled sections and climbs. The race formed the latter half of the opening weekend of the Belgian road cycling season with UCI WorldTour race Omloop Het Nieuwsblad held the previous day.

== Teams ==
Seventeen of the nineteen UCI WorldTeams were joined by eight UCI ProTeams to make up the twenty-five teams that participated in the race. All but one team entered seven riders for a total of 174 riders, many of whom also contested the previous day's Omloop Het Nieuwsblad; Trek–Segafredo was the exception with six riders, as Charlie Quarterman sustained injuries from a crash during that race. 114 riders finished.

UCI WorldTeams

- AG2R Citroën Team
- Astana–Premier Tech
- Bora–Hansgrohe
- Cofidis
- Deceuninck–Quick-Step
- EF Education–Nippo
- Groupama–FDJ
- INEOS Grenadiers
- Intermarché–Wanty–Gobert Matériaux
- Israel Start-Up Nation
- Lotto–Soudal
- Team Bahrain Victorious
- Team BikeExchange
- Team DSM
- Team Qhubeka Assos
- Trek–Segafredo
- UAE Team Emirates

UCI ProTeams

- Alpecin–Fenix
- Arkéa–Samsic
- B&B Hotels p/b KTM
- Bingoal WB
- Sport Vlaanderen–Baloise
- Total Direct Énergie
- Uno-X Pro Cycling Team
- Vini Zabù

== Result ==
Result
| Rank | Rider | Team | Time |
|---|---|---|---|
| 1 | Mads Pedersen (DEN) | Trek–Segafredo | 4h 37' 08" |
| 2 | Anthony Turgis (FRA) | Total Direct Énergie | + 0" |
| 3 | Tom Pidcock (GBR) | INEOS Grenadiers | + 0" |
| 4 | Matteo Trentin (ITA) | UAE Team Emirates | + 0" |
| 5 | Jenthe Biermans (BEL) | Israel Start-Up Nation | + 0" |
| 6 | Sonny Colbrelli (ITA) | Team Bahrain Victorious | + 0" |
| 7 | Nils Politt (GER) | Bora–Hansgrohe | + 0" |
| 8 | Greg Van Avermaet (BEL) | AG2R Citroën Team | + 0" |
| 9 | Bert Van Lerberghe (BEL) | Deceuninck–Quick-Step | + 0" |
| 10 | Erik Resell (NOR) | Uno-X Pro Cycling Team | + 0" |
