= 2025 Gent–Wevelgem =

Belgian one-day cycling race

2025 UCI World Tour, race 12 of 36
- Event poster with previous winners Lorena Wiebes and Mads Pedersen

Race details
- Dates: 30 March 2025
- Stages: 1
- Distance: 250.3 km (155.5 mi)
- Winning time: 5h 30' 21"

Results
	Winner	Mads Pedersen (DEN)	(Lidl–Trek)
	Second	Tim Merlier (BEL)	(Soudal–Quick-Step)
	Third	Jonathan Milan (ITA)	(Lidl–Trek)

The 2025 Gent–Wevelgem in Flanders Fields was a road cycling one-day race that took place on 30 March 2025 in the provinces of West Flanders and Hainaut in west Belgium. Held over 250.3 kilometres from Ypres to Wevelgem, it was the 87th edition of Gent–Wevelgem and the 12th event of the 2025 UCI World Tour. Mads Pedersen won the race for the second year in a row and the third time in his career after a solo attack 56 kilometres from the finish.

== Teams ==
Twenty-five teams participated in the race, including all eighteen UCI WorldTeams and seven UCI ProTeams.

UCI WorldTeams

- Alpecin–Deceuninck
- Arkéa–B&B Hotels
- Cofidis
- Decathlon–AG2R La Mondiale
- EF Education–EasyPost
- Groupama–FDJ
- INEOS Grenadiers
- Intermarché–Wanty
- Lidl–Trek
- Movistar Team
- Red Bull–Bora–Hansgrohe
- Soudal–Quick-Step
- Team Bahrain Victorious
- Team Jayco–AlUla
- Team Picnic–PostNL
- UAE Team Emirates XRG
- Visma–Lease a Bike
- XDS Astana Team

UCI ProTeams

- Israel–Premier Tech
- Lotto
- Q36.5 Pro Cycling Team
- Team Flanders–Baloise
- Team TotalEnergies
- Tudor Pro Cycling Team
- Uno-X Mobility

== Result ==
Result (1–10)
Rank	Rider	Team	Time
1	Mads Pedersen (DEN)	Lidl–Trek	5h 30' 21"
2	Tim Merlier (BEL)	Soudal–Quick-Step	+ 49"
3	Jonathan Milan (ITA)	Lidl–Trek	+ 49"
4	Alexander Kristoff (NOR)	Uno-X Mobility	+ 49"
5	Hugo Hofstetter (FRA)	Israel–Premier Tech	+ 49"
6	Davide Ballerini (ITA)	XDS Astana Team	+ 49"
7	Biniam Girmay (ERI)	Intermarché–Wanty	+ 49"
8	Jenno Berckmoes (BEL)	Lotto	+ 49"
9	Jordi Meeus (BEL)	Red Bull–Bora–Hansgrohe	+ 49"
10	Laurenz Rex (BEL)	Intermarché–Wanty	+ 49"
