= 2023 Dwars door Vlaanderen =

Cycling race

2023 UCI World Tour, race 13 of 35
- Event poster with previous winners Mathieu van der Poel and Chiara Consonni

Race details
- Dates: 29 March 2023
- Stages: 1
- Distance: 183.7 km (114.1 mi)
- Winning time: 4h 06' 20"

Results
	Winner	Christophe Laporte (FRA)	(Team Jumbo–Visma)
	Second	Oier Lazkano (ESP)	(Movistar Team)
	Third	Neilson Powless (USA)	(EF Education–EasyPost)

The 2023 Dwars door Vlaanderen was a road cycling one-day race that took place on 29 March 2023 in Belgium. It was the 77th edition of Dwars door Vlaanderen and the 13th event of the 2023 UCI World Tour.

The race was won by French rider Christophe Laporte of Team Jumbo–Visma after a late attack.

Route of the 2023 Dwars door Vlaanderen

== Teams ==
All eighteen UCI WorldTeams and seven UCI ProTeams participated in the race.

UCI WorldTeams

- AG2R Citroën Team
- Alpecin–Deceuninck
- Arkéa–Samsic
- Astana Qazaqstan Team
- Bora–Hansgrohe
- Cofidis
- EF Education–EasyPost
- Groupama–FDJ
- Ineos Grenadiers
- Intermarché–Circus–Wanty
- Movistar Team
- Soudal–Quick-Step
- Team Bahrain Victorious
- Team DSM
- Team Jayco–AlUla
- Team Jumbo–Visma
- Trek–Segafredo
- UAE Team Emirates

UCI ProTeams

- Bingoal WB
- Israel–Premier Tech
- Lotto–Dstny
- Q36.5 Pro Cycling Team
- Team Flanders–Baloise
- Team TotalEnergies
- Uno-X Pro Cycling Team

== Results ==
Result
Rank	Rider	Team	Time
1	Christophe Laporte (FRA)	Team Jumbo–Visma	4h 06' 20"
2	Oier Lazkano (ESP)	Movistar Team	+ 15"
3	Neilson Powless (USA)	EF Education–EasyPost	+ 15"
4	Jasper Philipsen (BEL)	Alpecin–Deceuninck	+ 15"
5	Mads Pedersen (DEN)	Trek–Segafredo	+ 15"
6	Arnaud De Lie (BEL)	Lotto–Dstny	+ 15"
7	Davide Ballerini (ITA)	Soudal–Quick-Step	+ 15"
8	Andrea Pasqualon (ITA)	Team Bahrain Victorious	+ 15"
9	Guillaume Boivin (CAN)	Israel–Premier Tech	+ 15"
10	Nils Politt (GER)	Bora–Hansgrohe	+ 15"
