= 2022 Tour of Flanders (men's race) =

Cycling race

2022 Ronde van Vlaanderen Elite Mannen
2022 UCI World Tour, race 12 of 32
- Event poster with previous winners Kasper Asgreen and Annemiek van Vleuten

Race details
- Dates: 3 April 2022
- Stages: 1
- Distance: 263.7 km (163.9 mi)
- Winning time: 6h 18' 30"

Results
| | Winner | Mathieu van der Poel (NED) | (Alpecin–Fenix) |
| | Second | Dylan van Baarle (NED) | (Ineos Grenadiers) |
| | Third | Valentin Madouas (FRA) | (Groupama–FDJ) |

The 106th edition of the Tour of Flanders one-day cycling classic took place on 3 April 2022, as the 12th event of the 2022 UCI World Tour. The race began in Antwerp and covered 272.5 kilometres (169.3 mi) on the way to the finish in Oudenaarde.

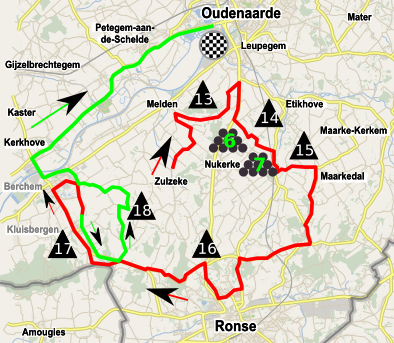
Final lap of the 2022 Ronde van Vlaanderen

== Teams ==
Seventeen of the eighteen UCI WorldTeams and seven UCI ProTeams participated in the race, of which only Team DSM, with six riders, did not enter the maximum of seven riders. From the field of 167 riders, there were 103 finishers.

UCI WorldTeams

- AG2R Citroën Team
- Astana Qazaqstan Team
- Bora–Hansgrohe
- Cofidis
- Quick-Step Alpha Vinyl Team
- EF Education–EasyPost
- Groupama–FDJ
- Ineos Grenadiers
- Intermarché–Wanty–Gobert Matériaux
- Lotto–Soudal
- Movistar Team
- Team Bahrain Victorious
- Team BikeExchange–Jayco
- Team DSM
- Team Jumbo–Visma
- Trek–Segafredo
- UAE Team Emirates

UCI ProTeams

- Alpecin–Fenix
- Arkéa–Samsic
- B&B Hotels–KTM
- Bingoal Pauwels Sauces WB
- Sport Vlaanderen–Baloise
- Team TotalEnergies
- Uno-X Pro Cycling Team

== Result ==
Result
| Rank | Rider | Team | Time |
|---|---|---|---|
| 1 | Mathieu van der Poel (NED) | Alpecin–Fenix | 6h 18' 30" |
| 2 | Dylan van Baarle (NED) | Ineos Grenadiers | + 0" |
| 3 | Valentin Madouas (FRA) | Groupama–FDJ | + 0" |
| 4 | Tadej Pogačar (SLO) | UAE Team Emirates | + 0" |
| 5 | Stefan Küng (SUI) | Groupama–FDJ | + 2" |
| 6 | Dylan Teuns (BEL) | Team Bahrain Victorious | + 2" |
| 7 | Fred Wright (GBR) | Team Bahrain Victorious | + 11" |
| 8 | Mads Pedersen (DEN) | Trek–Segafredo | + 48" |
| 9 | Christophe Laporte (FRA) | Team Jumbo–Visma | + 48" |
| 10 | Alexander Kristoff (NOR) | Intermarché–Wanty–Gobert Matériaux | + 48" |
