= 2025 Dwars door Vlaanderen =

Cycling race

2025 UCI World Tour, race 13 of 36
- Event poster with previous winners Matteo Jorgenson and Marianne Vos

Race details
- Dates: 2 April 2025
- Stages: 1
- Distance: 184.2 km (114.5 mi)
- Winning time: 3h 57' 14"

Results
	Winner	Neilson Powless (USA)	(EF Education–EasyPost)
	Second	Wout van Aert (BEL)	(Visma–Lease a Bike)
	Third	Tiesj Benoot (BEL)	(Visma–Lease a Bike)

The 2025 Dwars door Vlaanderen was a road cycling one-day race that took place on 2 April 2025, starting in Roeselare and finishing in Waregem, both in West Flanders. This was the 79th edition of Dwars door Vlaanderen and the 13th event of the 2025 UCI World Tour. The race was won by American rider Neilson Powless of EF Education–EasyPost in a sprint finish.

== Teams ==
All eighteen UCI WorldTeams and seven UCI ProTeams participated in the race. Defending champion Matteo Jorgenson looked to retain his crown, while the only other previous winner in the peloton was his Visma–Lease a Bike team-mate Dylan Van Baarle.

UCI WorldTeams

- Alpecin–Deceuninck
- Arkéa–B&B Hotels
- Cofidis
- Decathlon–AG2R La Mondiale
- EF Education–EasyPost
- Groupama–FDJ
- INEOS Grenadiers
- Intermarché–Wanty
- Lidl–Trek
- Movistar Team
- Red Bull–Bora–Hansgrohe
- Soudal–Quick-Step
- Team Bahrain Victorious
- Team Jayco–AlUla
- Team Picnic–PostNL
- UAE Team Emirates XRG
- Visma–Lease a Bike
- XDS Astana Team

UCI ProTeams

- Israel–Premier Tech
- Lotto
- Q36.5 Pro Cycling Team
- Team Flanders–Baloise
- Tudor Pro Cycling Team
- Uno-X Mobility
- Wagner Bazin WB

== Result ==
Result (1–10)}}
Rank	Rider	Team	Time
1	Neilson Powless (USA)	EF Education–EasyPost	3h 57' 14"
2	Wout van Aert (BEL)	Visma–Lease a Bike	+ 0"
3	Tiesj Benoot (BEL)	Visma–Lease a Bike	+ 0"
4	Matteo Jorgenson (USA)	Visma–Lease a Bike	+ 5"
5	Mads Pedersen (DEN)	Lidl–Trek	+ 45"
6	Tibor Del Grosso (NED)	Alpecin–Deceuninck	+ 45"
7	Dries De Bondt (BEL)	Decathlon–AG2R La Mondiale	+ 47"
8	Arjen Livyns (BEL)	Lotto	+ 47"
9	Stefan Küng (SUI)	Groupama–FDJ	+ 47"
10	Alec Segaert (BEL)	Lotto	+ 47"
