= 2023 Tour of Flanders (men's race) =

Cycling race

2023 Ronde van Vlaanderen Elite Mannen
2023 UCI World Tour, race 14 of 35
- Event poster with previous winners Mathieu van der Poel and Lotte Kopecky

Race details
- Dates: 2 April 2023
- Stages: 1
- Distance: 273.4 km (169.9 mi)

Results
	Winner	Tadej Pogačar (SLO)	(UAE Team Emirates)
	Second	Mathieu van der Poel (NED)	(Alpecin–Deceuninck)
	Third	Mads Pedersen (DEN)	(Trek–Segafredo)

The 107th edition of the Tour of Flanders one-day cycling classic took place on 2 April 2023, as the 14th event of the 2023 UCI World Tour. The race began in Bruges and covered 273.4 kilometres (169.9 mi) on the way to the finish in Oudenaarde. It was the second Monument of the 2023 cycling season.

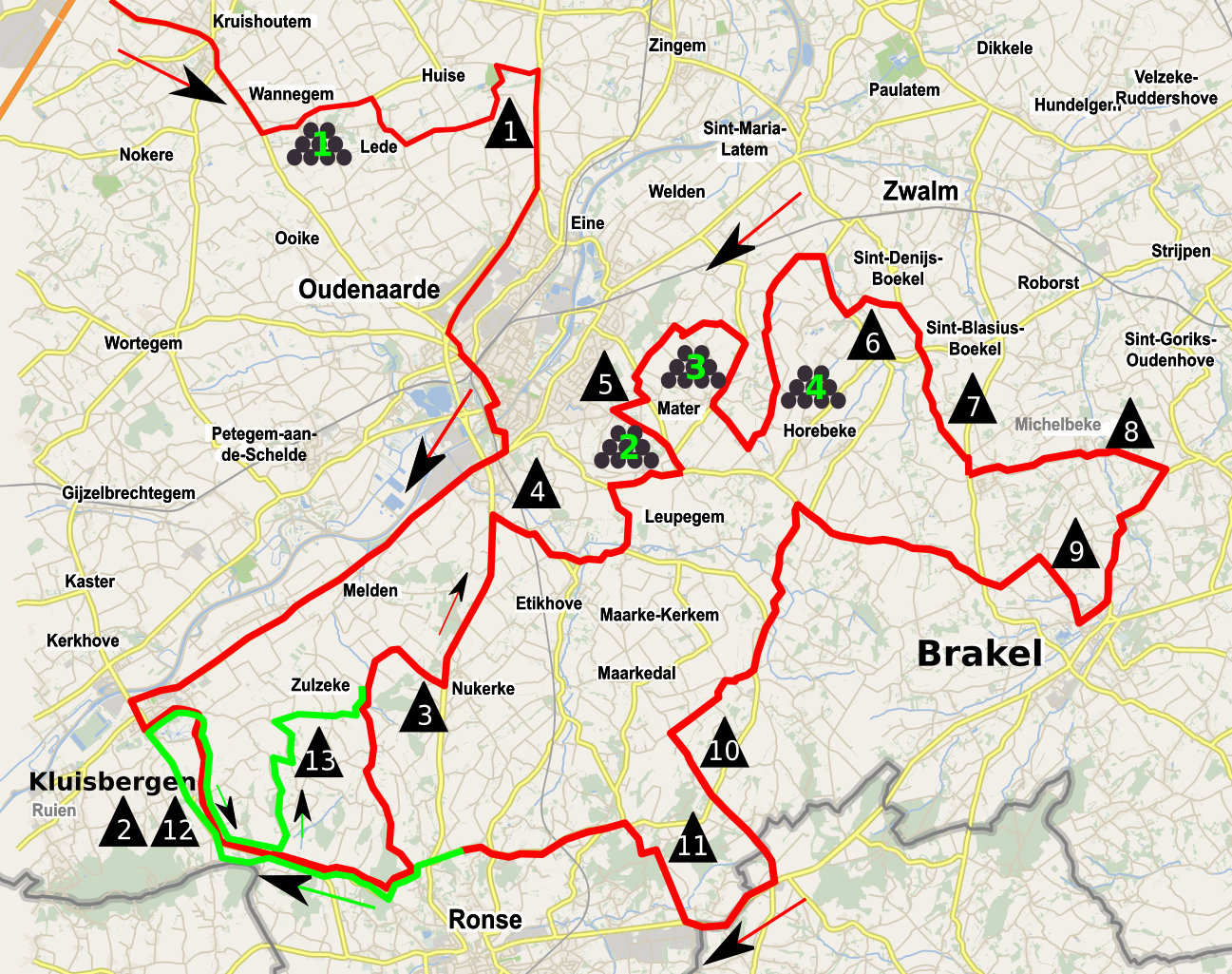
Route of the 2023 Ronde van Vlaanderen

The race was won by Tadej Pogačar of UAE Team Emirates, becoming only the third rider in history to win both the Tour de France and the Tour of Flanders. After attacking on the second ascent of Oude Kwaremont and Koppenberg to force a selection, Pogačar attacked on the last ascent of the Oude Kwaremont with around 18 kilometres remaining to drop his rivals, soloing the remainder of the race to win his third different cycling monument and fourth overall. Second place went to last year's winner, Mathieu van der Poel of Alpecin–Deceuninck, 16 seconds behind the Slovenian. Van der Poel, together with Wout van Aert, were the only riders able to go with Pogačar's initial attacks. Van der Poel dropped van Aert with an acceleration on the Kruisberg before getting distanced by the Slovene's race-winning attack. Third place went to Mads Pedersen of Trek–Segafredo after he outsprinted a group of seven to take the final podium spot. Pedersen was part of a group that went just after the Molenberg with around 100 kilometres remaining, holding a lead of three minutes over the main favorites at one point. Pedersen attacked the group with 30 kilometres to go before he was caught and passed by Pogačar and van der Poel on the second ascent of Oude Kwaremont.

Filip Maciejuk of Team Bahrain Victorious was disqualified during the first half of the race after provoking a "huge accident" when rejoining the road. Many in the peloton were taken down in the crash, with Peter Sagan and Tim Wellens abandoning the race as a result. Maciejuk subsequently apologised for his actions, stating "This should not happen and was a big error in my judgement."

== Teams ==
All eighteen UCI WorldTeams and seven UCI ProTeams took part in the race.

UCI WorldTeams

- AG2R Citroën Team
- Alpecin–Deceuninck
- Arkéa–Samsic
- Astana Qazaqstan Team
- Bora–Hansgrohe
- Cofidis
- EF Education–EasyPost
- Groupama–FDJ
- Ineos Grenadiers
- Intermarché–Circus–Wanty
- Movistar Team
- Soudal–Quick-Step
- Team Bahrain Victorious
- Team DSM
- Team Jayco–AlUla
- Team Jumbo–Visma
- Trek–Segafredo
- UAE Team Emirates

UCI ProTeams

- Bingoal WB
- Israel–Premier Tech
- Lotto–Dstny
- Q36.5 Pro Cycling Team
- Team Flanders–Baloise
- Team TotalEnergies
- Uno-X Pro Cycling Team

== Result ==
Result
Rank	Rider	Team	Time
1	Tadej Pogačar (SLO)	UAE Team Emirates	6h 12' 07"
2	Mathieu van der Poel (NED)	Alpecin–Deceuninck	+ 16"
3	Mads Pedersen (DEN)	Trek–Segafredo	+ 1' 12"
4	Wout van Aert (BEL)	Team Jumbo–Visma	+ 1' 12"
5	Neilson Powless (USA)	EF Education–EasyPost	+ 1' 12"
6	Stefan Küng (SUI)	Groupama–FDJ	+ 1' 12"
7	Kasper Asgreen (DEN)	Soudal–Quick-Step	+ 1' 12"
8	Fred Wright (GBR)	Team Bahrain Victorious	+ 1' 12"
9	Matteo Jorgenson (USA)	Movistar Team	+ 1' 19"
10	Matteo Trentin (ITA)	UAE Team Emirates	+ 2' 49"
