= 2024 Tour of Flanders (men's race) =

Cycling race

2024 Ronde van Vlaanderen Elite Mannen
2024 UCI World Tour, race 14 of 35
- Event poster with previous winners Tadej Pogačar and Lotte Kopecky

Race details
- Dates: 31 March 2024
- Stages: 1
- Distance: 270.8 km (168.3 mi)

Results
	Winner	Mathieu van der Poel (NED)	(Alpecin–Deceuninck)
	Second	Luca Mozzato (ITA)	(Arkéa–B&B Hotels)
	Third	Nils Politt (GER)	(UAE Team Emirates)

The 2024 Tour of Flanders was a one-day cycling classic which took place on 31 March. It was the 108th edition of the Tour of Flanders (men's race), and the 14th event of the 2024 UCI World Tour.

Route of the 2024 Ronde van Vlaanderen

== Teams ==
All eighteen UCI WorldTeams and seven UCI ProTeams participated in the race. All teams entered a full squad of seven riders. Only 87 riders out of 175 who started completed the race.

UCI WorldTeams

- Alpecin–Deceuninck
- Arkéa–B&B Hotels
- Astana Qazaqstan Team
- Bora–Hansgrohe
- Cofidis
- Decathlon–AG2R La Mondiale
- EF Education–EasyPost
- Groupama–FDJ
- Ineos Grenadiers
- Intermarché–Wanty
- Lidl–Trek
- Movistar Team
- Soudal–Quick-Step
- Team Bahrain Victorious
- Team dsm–firmenich PostNL
- Team Jayco–AlUla
- UAE Team Emirates
- Visma–Lease a Bike

UCI ProTeams

- Bingoal WB
- Israel–Premier Tech
- Lotto–Dstny
- Q36.5 Pro Cycling Team
- Team Flanders–Baloise
- Tudor Pro Cycling Team
- Uno-X Mobility

== Result ==
Result
Rank	Rider	Team	Time
1	Mathieu van der Poel (NED)	Alpecin–Deceuninck	6h 05' 17"
2	Luca Mozzato (ITA)	Arkéa–B&B Hotels	+ 1' 02"
3	Nils Politt (GER)	UAE Team Emirates	+ 1' 02"
4	Mikkel Bjerg (DEN)	UAE Team Emirates	+ 1' 02"
5	António Morgado (POR)	UAE Team Emirates	+ 1' 02"
6	Magnus Sheffield (USA)	Ineos Grenadiers	+ 1' 02"
7	Oliver Naesen (BEL)	Decathlon–AG2R La Mondiale	+ 1' 02"
8	Dylan Teuns (BEL)	Israel–Premier Tech	+ 1' 02"
9	Alberto Bettiol (ITA)	EF Education–EasyPost	+ 1' 02"
10	Toms Skujiņš (LAT)	Lidl–Trek	+ 1' 02"
