= 2022 UCI Road World Championships – Men's under-23 road race =

Cycling event

Men's under-23 road race
2022 UCI Road World Championships
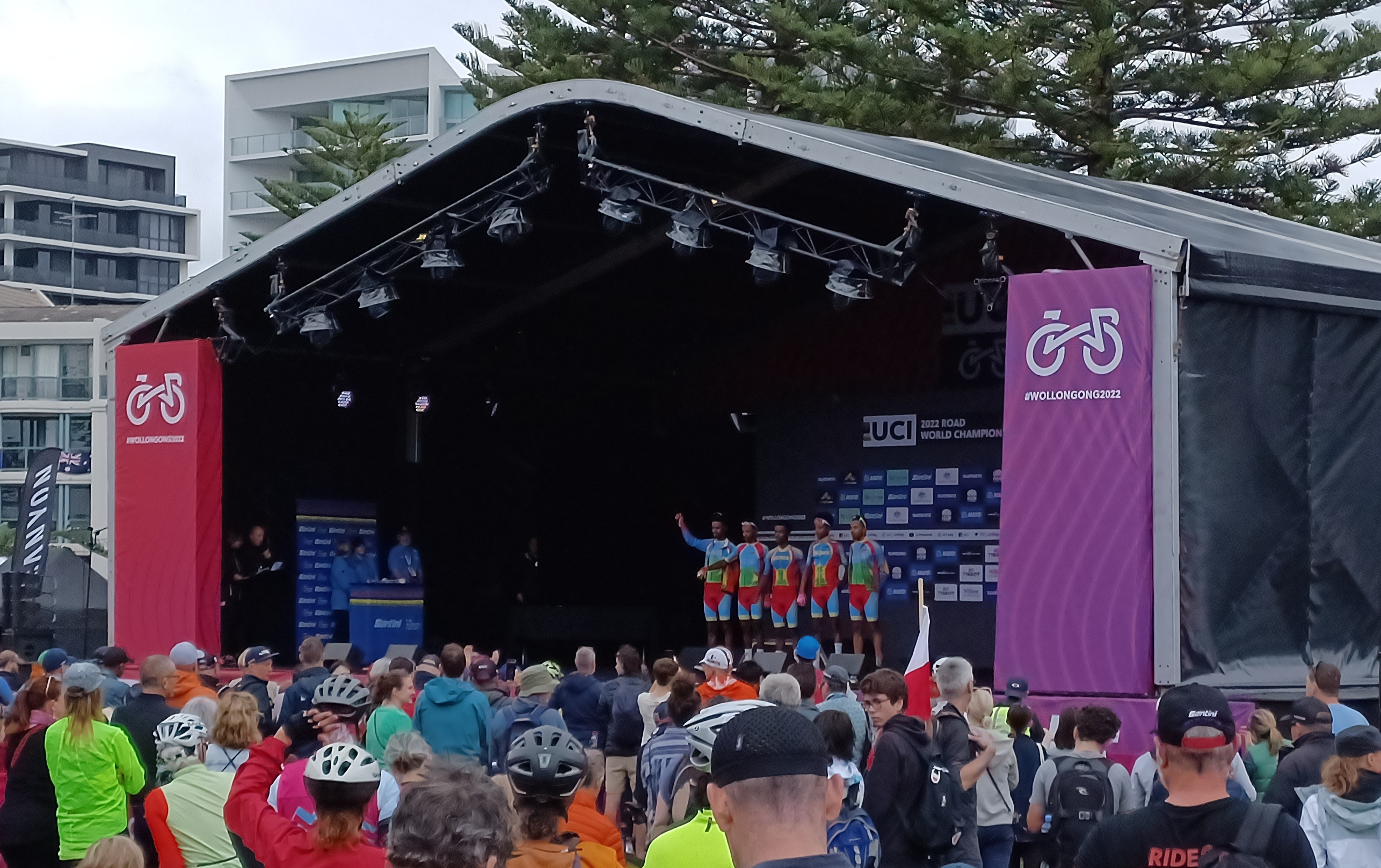
- The Eritrea team before the race

Race details
- Dates: 23 September 2022
- Distance: 169.8 km (105.5 mi)
- Winning time: 3:57:08

Medalists
	Gold	Yevgeniy Fedorov (KAZ)
	Silver	Mathias Vacek (CZE)
	Bronze	Søren Wærenskjold (NOR)

The men's under-23 road race of the 2022 UCI Road World Championships was a cycling event that took place on 23 September 2022 in Wollongong, Australia.

== Final classification ==
Of the race's 132 entrants, 70 riders completed the full distance of 169.8 kilometres (105.5 mi).

Rank	Rider	Country	Time	Behind
1st place, gold medalist(s)	Yevgeniy Fedorov	Kazakhstan	3:57:08	+0:00
2nd place, silver medalist(s)	Mathias Vacek	Czech Republic	3:57:09	+0:01
3rd place, bronze medalist(s)	Søren Wærenskjold	Norway	3:57:11	+0:03
4	Madis Mihkels	Estonia	3:57:11	+0:03
5	Olav Kooij	Netherlands	3:57:11	+0:03
6	Pavel Bittner	Czech Republic	3:57:11	+0:03
7	Matthew Dinham	Australia	3:57:11	+0:03
8	Paul Penhoët	France	3:57:11	+0:03
9	Matevž Govekar	Slovenia	3:57:11	+0:03
10	Jenno Berckmoes	Belgium	3:57:11	+0:03
11	Michel Hessmann	Germany	3:57:11	+0:03
12	Erik Fetter	Hungary	3:57:11	+0:03
13	Per Strand Hagenes	Norway	3:57:11	+0:03
14	Samuel Watson	Great Britain	3:57:11	+0:03
15	Alexandre Balmer	Switzerland	3:57:11	+0:03
16	Martin Svrček	Slovakia	3:57:11	+0:03
17	Lennert van Eetvelt	Belgium	3:57:11	+0:03
18	Bastien Tronchon	France	3:57:16	+0:08
19	Alec Segaert	Belgium	3:57:31	+0:23
20	Romain Grégoire	France	3:57:31	+0:23
21	Raúl García Pierna	Spain	3:58:06	+0:58
22	Pau Miquel	Spain	3:58:06	+0:58
23	Nicolò Buratti	Italy	3:58:06	+0:58
24	Vito Braet	Belgium	3:58:22	+1:14
25	Lorenzo Milesi	Italy	3:58:22	+1:14
26	Jakub Ťoupalík	Czech Republic	3:58:22	+1:14
27	Tobias Lund Andresen	Denmark	3:58:22	+1:14
28	Fabio Van den Bossche	Belgium	3:58:51	+1:43
29	Mathis Le Berre	France	4:00:03	+2:55
30	Maurice Ballerstedt	Germany	4:00:42	+3:34
31	Hannes Wilksch	Germany	4:00:42	+3:34
32	Casper van Uden	Netherlands	4:00:45	+3:37
33	Tim Teutenberg	Germany	4:00:45	+3:37
34	Cédric Pries	Luxembourg	4:00:45	+3:37
35	Nicolò Parisini	Italy	4:00:45	+3:37
36	Colby Simmons	United States	4:00:45	+3:37
37	Fabian Weiss	Switzerland	4:00:45	+3:37
38	Gleb Brussenskiy	Kazakhstan	4:00:45	+3:37
39	Nils Brun	Switzerland	4:00:45	+3:37
40	Tim van Dijke	Netherlands	4:00:45	+3:37
41	Robert Donaldson	Great Britain	4:00:45	+3:37
42	Martin Marcellusi	Italy	4:00:45	+3:37
43	Embret Svestad-Bårdseng	Norway	4:00:45	+3:37
44	Logan Currie	New Zealand	4:00:45	+3:37
45	Sebastian Kolze Changizi	Denmark	4:00:50	+3:42
46	Dries De Pooter	Belgium	4:02:21	+5:13
47	Petr Kelemen	Czech Republic	4:00:51	+5:43
48	Sean Flynn	Great Britain	4:00:51	+5:43
49	Pierre-Pascal Keup	Germany	4:00:51	+5:43
50	Nicolas Rivard	Canada	4:00:51	+5:43
51	Mihael Štajnar	Slovenia	4:00:51	+5:43
52	Davide De Pretto	Italy	4:05:51	+8:43
53	Fran Miholjević	Croatia	4:05:51	+8:43
54	Enekoitz Azparren	Spain	4:05:51	+8:43
55	Luke Lamperti	United States	4:05:51	+8:43
56	Maksym Bilyi	Ukraine	4:06:47	+9:39
57	Hamza Amari	Algeria	4:06:47	+9:39
58	Germán Darío Gómez	Colombia	4:06:47	+9:39
59	Nicolas Vinokurov	Kazakhstan	4:06:47	+9:39
60	Callum Ormiston	South Africa	4:06:47	+9:39
61	Arnaud Tendon	Switzerland	4:06:47	+9:39
62	Matthew Riccitello	United States	4:06:47	+9:39
63	Carson Miles	Canada	4:06:47	+9:39
64	Jannis Peter	Germany	4:06:47	+9:39
65	Tord Gudmestad	Norway	4:06:47	+9:39
66	Jokin Murguialday	Spain	4:06:47	+9:39
67	Mats Wenzel	Luxembourg	4:06:47	+9:39
68	Oliver Stockwell	Great Britain	4:06:47	+9:39
69	Felix Engelhardt	Germany	4:06:47	+9:39
70	Leo Hayter	Great Britain	4:06:47	+9:39

Rank	Rider	Country	Time	Behind
	Anže Skok	Slovenia	Did not finish	
	Andrey Remkhe	Kazakhstan	Did not finish	
	Martin Messner	Austria	Did not finish	
	Aivaras Mikutis	Lithuania	Did not finish	
	Tom Paquet	Luxembourg	Did not finish	
	Rafael Pereira Marques	Luxembourg	Did not finish	
	Harold Lopez Granizo	Ecuador	Did not finish	
	Ewen Costiou	France	Did not finish	
	Rudy Porter	Australia	Did not finish	
	Dylan Hopkins	Australia	Did not finish	
	Jensen Plowright	Australia	Did not finish	
	Kaden Hopkins	Bermuda	Did not finish	
	Tristan Jussaume	Canada	Did not finish	
	Finn Gullickson	United States	Did not finish	
	Boštjan Murn	Slovenia	Did not finish	
	Vinicius Rangel Costa	Brazil	Did not finish	
	Patrick Welch	United States	Did not finish	
	Ren Bao Tsen	Malaysia	Did not finish	
	Axel van der Tuuk	Netherlands	Did not finish	
	William Levy	Denmark	Did not finish	
	Mateusz Gajdulewicz	Poland	Did not finish	
	Byiza Renus Uhiriwe	Rwanda	Did not finish	
	Kiya Rogora	Ethiopia	Did not finish	
	Milkias Kudus	Eritrea	Did not finish	
	Juan Barboza Nader	Colombia	Did not finish	
	Nurbergen Nurlykhassym	Kazakhstan	Did not finish	
	Eddy Le Huitouze	France	Did not finish	
	Ivan Romeo Abad	Spain	Did not finish	
	Juan Tito Rendón	Colombia	Did not finish	
	Kacper Gieryk	Poland	Did not finish	
	Jack Drage	New Zealand	Did not finish	
	Dylan George	Australia	Did not finish	
	Rait Arm	Estonia	Did not finish	
	Joonas Kurits	Estonia	Did not finish	
	Youssef Bdadoue	Morocco	Did not finish	
	Tiano Da Silva	South Africa	Did not finish	
	Simon Tesfagaber	Eritrea	Did not finish	
	Samuel Tuka	Slovakia	Did not finish	
	Pavol Rovder	Slovakia	Did not finish	
	Carl-Frederik Bevort	Denmark	Did not finish	
	Daniel Berhe	Eritrea	Did not finish	
	Arthur Kluckers	Luxembourg	Did not finish	
	Nicolás Gómez Jaramillo	Colombia	Did not finish	
	Nasser Eddine Maatougui	Morocco	Did not finish	
	Christopher Morales Fontan	Puerto Rico	Did not finish	
	Christiaan Klopper	South Africa	Did not finish	
	Anouar Rahmou	Morocco	Did not finish	
	Ahmed Naser	Brunei	Did not finish	
	Blayde Blas	Guam	Did not finish	
	King Hung Liang	Hong Kong	Did not finish	
	Emmanuel Iradukunda	Rwanda	Did not finish	
	Mohammad Almutaiwei	United Arab Emirates	Did not finish	
	Yuhi Todome	Japan	Did not finish	
	Tsun Wai Chu	Hong Kong	Did not finish	
	Adam Holm Jørgensen	Denmark	Did not finish	
	Jacob Hindsgaul Madsen	Denmark	Did not finish	
	Amanuel Mehari	Eritrea	Did not finish	
	Joseph Lau	Hong Kong	Did not finish	
	Samsom Habte	Eritrea	Did not finish	
	Mick van Dijke	Netherlands	Did not start	
	Negasi Haylu Abreha	Ethiopia	Did not start	
	Lukaš Kubiš	Slovakia	Did not start	
