= 2023 Tour of Belgium =

2023 UCI ProSeries

Race details
- Dates: 14–18 June 2023
- Stages: 5
- Distance: 723.2 km (449.4 mi)
- Winning time: 16h 09' 30"

Results
Jersey awarded to the overall winner	Winner	Mathieu van der Poel (NED)	(Alpecin–Deceuninck)
	Second	Søren Wærenskjold (NOR)	(Uno-X Pro Cycling Team)
	Third	Casper Pedersen (DEN)	(Soudal–Quick-Step)
Jersey awarded to the points classification winner	Points	Mathieu van der Poel (NED)	(Alpecin–Deceuninck)
Jersey awarded to the youth classification winner	Youth	Mathias Vacek (CZE)	(Trek–Segafredo)
Jersey awarded to the combativity classification winner	Combativity	Alex Colman (BEL)	(Team Flanders–Baloise)
	Team	(United States) Trek–Segafredo	

The 2023 Tour of Belgium (known as the 2023 Baloise Belgium Tour for sponsorship purposes) is the 92nd edition of the Tour of Belgium road cycling stage race, which is taking place from 14 to 18 June 2023. The category 2.Pro event formed a part of the 2023 UCI ProSeries.

== Teams ==
Six of the nineteen UCI WorldTeams, ten UCI ProTeams, and five UCI Continental teams made up the twenty-one teams that participated in the race.

UCI WorldTeams

- Alpecin–Deceuninck
- Astana Qazaqstan Team
- Intermarché–Circus–Wanty
- Soudal–Quick-Step
- Team DSM
- Trek–Segafredo

UCI ProTeams

- Bingoal WB
- Bolton Equities Black Spoke
- Eolo–Kometa
- Human Powered Health
- Israel–Premier Tech
- Lotto–Dstny
- Team Corratec–Selle Italia
- Team Flanders–Baloise
- Team Novo Nordisk
- Uno-X Pro Cycling Team

UCI Continental Teams

- Baloise–Trek Lions
- BEAT Cycling Club
- Pauwels Sauzen–Bingoal
- Tarteletto–Isorex
- VolkerWessels Cycling Team

== Route ==
Stage characteristics and winners
Stage	Date	Course	Distance	Type	Stage winner
1	14 June	Scherpenheuvel-Zichem to Scherpenheuvel-Zichem	164.9 km (102.5 mi)	Flat stage	Jasper Philipsen (BEL)
2	15 June	Merelbeke to Knokke-Heist	175.7 km (109.2 mi)	Flat stage	Fabio Jakobsen (NED)
3	16 June	Beveren to Beveren	15.2 km (9.4 mi)	Individual time trial	Søren Wærenskjold (NOR)
4	17 June	Durbuy to Durbuy	172.6 km (107.2 mi)	Hilly stage	Mathieu van der Poel (NED)
5	18 June	Brussels to Brussels	194.8 km (121.0 mi)	Flat stage	Fabio Jakobsen (NED)
Total			723.2 km (449.4 mi)		

== Stages ==
=== Stage 1 ===
14 June 2023 — Scherpenheuvel-Zichem to Scherpenheuvel-Zichem, 164.9 km (102.5 mi)

Stage 1 Result
Rank	Rider	Team	Time
1	Jasper Philipsen (BEL)	Alpecin–Deceuninck	3h 38' 14"
2	Fabio Jakobsen (NED)	Soudal–Quick-Step	+ 0"
3	Timothy Dupont (BEL)	Tarteletto–Isorex	+ 0"
4	Alexander Kristoff (NOR)	Uno-X Pro Cycling Team	+ 0"
5	David Martín (ESP)	Eolo–Kometa	+ 0"
6	Mathieu van der Poel (NED)	Alpecin–Deceuninck	+ 0"
7	Joris Nieuwenhuis (NED)	Baloise–Trek Lions	+ 0"
8	Ryan Kamp (NED)	Pauwels Sauzen–Bingoal	+ 0"
9	Oded Kogut (ISR)	Israel–Premier Tech	+ 0"
10	Tom Van Asbroeck (BEL)	Israel–Premier Tech	+ 0"

General classification after Stage 1
Rank	Rider	Team	Time
1	Jasper Philipsen (BEL)	Alpecin–Deceuninck	3h 38' 04"
2	Mathieu van der Poel (NED)	Alpecin–Deceuninck	+ 2"
3	Fabio Jakobsen (NED)	Soudal–Quick-Step	+ 4"
4	Casper Pedersen (DEN)	Soudal–Quick-Step	+ 4"
5	Timothy Dupont (BEL)	Tarteletto–Isorex	+ 6"
6	Rasmus Tiller (NOR)	Uno-X Pro Cycling Team	+ 7"
7	Jasper De Buyst (BEL)	Lotto–Dstny	+ 9"
8	Alexander Kristoff (NOR)	Uno-X Pro Cycling Team	+ 10"
9	David Martín (ESP)	Eolo–Kometa	+ 10"
10	Joris Nieuwenhuis (NED)	Baloise–Trek Lions	+ 10"

=== Stage 2 ===
15 June 2023 — Merelbeke to Knokke-Heist, 175.7 km (109.2 mi)

Stage 2 Result
Rank	Rider	Team	Time
1	Fabio Jakobsen (NED)	Soudal–Quick-Step	3h 52' 07"
2	Mathieu van der Poel (NED)	Alpecin–Deceuninck	+ 0"
3	Jasper De Buyst (BEL)	Lotto–Dstny	+ 0"
4	Alexander Kristoff (NOR)	Uno-X Pro Cycling Team	+ 0"
5	Søren Wærenskjold (NOR)	Uno-X Pro Cycling Team	+ 0"
6	Gerben Thijssen (BEL)	Intermarché–Circus–Wanty	+ 0"
7	Rory Townsend (IRL)	Bolton Equities Black Spoke	+ 0"
8	Emīls Liepiņš (LAT)	Trek–Segafredo	+ 0"
9	Oded Kogut (ISR)	Israel–Premier Tech	+ 0"
10	Matteo Malucelli (ITA)	Bingoal WB	+ 0"

General classification after Stage 2
Rank	Rider	Team	Time
1	Fabio Jakobsen (NED)	Soudal–Quick-Step	7h 30' 05"
2	Mathieu van der Poel (NED)	Alpecin–Deceuninck	+ 0"
3	Jasper De Buyst (BEL)	Lotto–Dstny	+ 7"
4	Casper Pedersen (DEN)	Soudal–Quick-Step	+ 10"
5	Rasmus Tiller (NOR)	Uno-X Pro Cycling Team	+ 10"
6	Timothy Dupont (BEL)	Tarteletto–Isorex	+ 12"
7	Mathias Vacek (CZE)	Trek–Segafredo	+ 13"
8	Yves Lampaert (BEL)	Soudal–Quick-Step	+ 13"
9	Florian Vermeersch (BEL)	Lotto–Dstny	+ 15"
10	Jasper Stuyven (BEL)	Baloise–Trek Lions	+ 15"

=== Stage 3 ===
16 June 2023 — Beveren to Beveren, 15.2 km (9.4 mi) (ITT)

Stage 3 Result
Rank	Rider	Team	Time
1	Søren Wærenskjold (NOR)	Uno-X Pro Cycling Team	17' 09"
2	Yves Lampaert (BEL)	Soudal–Quick-Step	+ 12"
3	Alex Edmondson (AUS)	Team DSM	+ 13"
4	Mathieu van der Poel (NED)	Alpecin–Deceuninck	+ 15"
5	Jasper Stuyven (BEL)	Trek–Segafredo	+ 18"
6	Jannik Steimle (GER)	Soudal–Quick-Step	+ 19"
7	Aaron Gate (NZL)	Bolton Equities Black Spoke	+ 19"
8	Casper Pedersen (DEN)	Soudal–Quick-Step	+ 26"
9	Cees Bol (NED)	Astana Qazaqstan Team	+ 28"
10	Sam Welsford (AUS)	Team DSM	+ 30"

General classification after Stage 3
Rank	Rider	Team	Time
1	Mathieu van der Poel (NED)	Alpecin–Deceuninck	7h 47' 29"
2	Søren Wærenskjold (NOR)	Uno-X Pro Cycling Team	+ 1"
3	Yves Lampaert (BEL)	Soudal–Quick-Step	+ 10"
4	Jasper Stuyven (BEL)	Trek–Segafredo	+ 18"
5	Casper Pedersen (DEN)	Soudal–Quick-Step	+ 21"
6	Rasmus Tiller (NOR)	Uno-X Pro Cycling Team	+ 29"
7	Jasper De Buyst (BEL)	Lotto–Dstny	+ 32"
8	Florian Vermeersch (BEL)	Lotto–Dstny	+ 34"
9	Mathias Vacek (CZE)	Trek–Segafredo	+ 34"
10	Ben Hermans (BEL)	Israel–Premier Tech	+ 42"

=== Stage 4 ===
17 June 2023 — Durbuy to Durbuy, 172.6 km (107.2 mi)

Stage 4 Result
Rank	Rider	Team	Time
1	Mathieu van der Poel (NED)	Alpecin–Deceuninck	4h 09' 42"
2	Thibau Nys (BEL)	Trek–Segafredo	+ 16"
3	Casper Pedersen (DEN)	Soudal–Quick-Step	+ 18"
4	Søren Wærenskjold (NOR)	Uno-X Pro Cycling Team	+ 20"
5	Jasper De Buyst (BEL)	Lotto–Dstny	+ 26"
6	Cristian Scaroni (ITA)	Astana Qazaqstan Team	+ 26"
7	Vincenzo Albanese (ITA)	Eolo–Kometa	+ 28"
8	Yves Lampaert (BEL)	Soudal–Quick-Step	+ 30"
9	Jonas Abrahamsen (NOR)	Uno-X Pro Cycling Team	+ 30"
10	Lorenzo Rota (ITA)	Intermarché–Circus–Wanty	+ 32"

General classification after Stage 4
Rank	Rider	Team	Time
1	Mathieu van der Poel (NED)	Alpecin–Deceuninck	11h 56' 52"
2	Søren Wærenskjold (NOR)	Uno-X Pro Cycling Team	+ 40"
3	Casper Pedersen (DEN)	Soudal–Quick-Step	+ 53"
4	Yves Lampaert (BEL)	Soudal–Quick-Step	+ 59"
5	Jasper Stuyven (BEL)	Trek–Segafredo	+ 1' 10"
6	Jasper De Buyst (BEL)	Lotto–Dstny	+ 1' 17"
7	Florian Vermeersch (BEL)	Lotto–Dstny	+ 1' 25"
8	Ben Hermans (BEL)	Israel–Premier Tech	+ 1' 35"
9	Mathias Vacek (CZE)	Trek–Segafredo	+ 1' 46"
10	Toms Skujiņš (LAT)	Trek–Segafredo	+ 1' 47"

=== Stage 5 ===
18 June 2023 — Brussels to Brussels, 194.8 km (121.0 mi)

Stage 5 Result
Rank	Rider	Team	Time
1	Fabio Jakobsen (NED)	Soudal–Quick-Step	4h 12' 38"
2	Jasper Philipsen (BEL)	Alpecin–Deceuninck	+ 0"
3	Thibau Nys (BEL)	Trek–Segafredo	+ 0"
4	Cees Bol (NED)	Astana Qazaqstan Team	+ 0"
5	Alexander Kristoff (NOR)	Uno-X Pro Cycling Team	+ 0"
6	Oded Kogut (ISR)	Israel–Premier Tech	+ 0"
7	Caleb Ewan (AUS)	Lotto–Dstny	+ 0"
8	Emiel Vermeulen (BEL)	BEAT Cycling Club	+ 0"
9	Gerben Thijssen (BEL)	Intermarché–Circus–Wanty	+ 0"
10	Mathieu van der Poel (NED)	Alpecin–Deceuninck	+ 0"

General classification after Stage 5
Rank	Rider	Team	Time
1	Mathieu van der Poel (NED)	Alpecin–Deceuninck	16h 09' 30"
2	Søren Wærenskjold (NOR)	Uno-X Pro Cycling Team	+ 40"
3	Casper Pedersen (DEN)	Soudal–Quick-Step	+ 53"
4	Yves Lampaert (BEL)	Soudal–Quick-Step	+ 59"
5	Jasper Stuyven (BEL)	Trek–Segafredo	+ 1' 10"
6	Jasper De Buyst (BEL)	Lotto–Dstny	+ 1' 17"
7	Florian Vermeersch (BEL)	Lotto–Dstny	+ 1' 25"
8	Ben Hermans (BEL)	Israel–Premier Tech	+ 1' 35"
9	Mathias Vacek (CZE)	Trek–Segafredo	+ 1' 44"
10	Toms Skujiņš (LAT)	Trek–Segafredo	+ 1' 46"

== Classification leadership table ==
Classification leadership by stage
Stage	Winner	General classification (Dutch: Algemeen klassement)	Points classification (Dutch: Puntenklassement)	Combativity classification (Dutch: Strijdlustklassement)	Young rider classification (Dutch: Jongerenklassement)	Team classification (Dutch: Ploegenklassement)
1	Jasper Philipsen	Jasper Philipsen	Jasper Philipsen	Jacob Scott	Oded Kogut	Eolo–Kometa
2	Fabio Jakobsen	Fabio Jakobsen	Fabio Jakobsen	Jacob Scott	Mathias Vacek	Soudal–Quick-Step
3	Søren Wærenskjold	Mathieu van der Poel	Fabio Jakobsen	Jacob Scott	Mathias Vacek	Soudal–Quick-Step
4	Mathieu van der Poel	Mathieu van der Poel	Mathieu van der Poel	Aaron Van Poucke	Mathias Vacek	Trek–Segafredo
5	Fabio Jakobsen	Mathieu van der Poel	Mathieu van der Poel	Alex Colman	Mathias Vacek	Trek–Segafredo
Final		Mathieu van der Poel	Mathieu van der Poel	Alex Colman	Mathias Vacek	Trek–Segafredo

- On stage 2, Timothy Dupont, who was third in the points classification, wore the red jersey because first placed Jasper Philipsen wore the purple jersey as leader of the general classification and second placed Fabio Jakobsen wore the European champion's jersey.
- On stage 3, Mathieu van der Poel, who was second in the points classification, wore the red jersey because first placed Fabio Jakobsen wore the purple jersey as leader of the general classification.
- On stage 5, Søren Wærenskjold, who was second in the points classification, wore the red jersey because first placed Mathieu van der Poel wore the purple jersey as leader of the general classification.

== Classification standings ==
Legend
Denotes the winner of the general classification	Denotes the winner of the combativity classification
Denotes the winner of the points classification	Denotes the winner of the young rider classification

=== General classification ===
Final general classification (1–10)
Rank	Rider	Team	Time
1	Mathieu van der Poel (NED)	Alpecin–Deceuninck	16h 09' 30"
2	Søren Wærenskjold (NOR)	Uno-X Pro Cycling Team	+ 40"
3	Casper Pedersen (DEN)	Soudal–Quick-Step	+ 53"
4	Yves Lampaert (BEL)	Soudal–Quick-Step	+ 59"
5	Jasper Stuyven (BEL)	Trek–Segafredo	+ 1' 10"
6	Jasper De Buyst (BEL)	Lotto–Dstny	+ 1' 17"
7	Florian Vermeersch (BEL)	Lotto–Dstny	+ 1' 25"
8	Ben Hermans (BEL)	Israel–Premier Tech	+ 1' 35"
9	Mathias Vacek (CZE)	Trek–Segafredo	+ 1' 44"
10	Toms Skujiņš (LAT)	Trek–Segafredo	+ 1' 46"

=== Points classification ===
Final points classification (1–10)
Rank	Rider	Team	Points
1	Mathieu van der Poel (NED)	Alpecin–Deceuninck	94
2	Fabio Jakobsen (NED)	Soudal–Quick-Step	85
3	Søren Wærenskjold (NOR)	Uno-X Pro Cycling Team	56
4	Jasper Philipsen (BEL)	Alpecin–Deceuninck	55
5	Alexander Kristoff (NOR)	Uno-X Pro Cycling Team	55
6	Thibau Nys (BEL)	Trek–Segafredo	47
7	Jasper De Buyst (BEL)	Lotto–Dstny	39
8	Oded Kogut (ISR)	Israel–Premier Tech	37
9	Casper Pedersen (DEN)	Soudal–Quick-Step	30
10	Yves Lampaert (BEL)	Soudal–Quick-Step	30

=== Combativity classification ===
Final combativity classification (1–10)
Rank	Rider	Team	Points
1	Alex Colman (BEL)	Team Flanders–Baloise	63
2	Aaron Van Poucke (BEL)	Team Flanders–Baloise	47
3	Kobe Vanoverschelde (BEL)	Tarteletto–Isorex	39
4	Jacob Scott (GBR)	Bolton Equities Black Spoke	30
5	James Fouché (NZL)	Bolton Equities Black Spoke	18
6	Ceriel Desal (BEL)	Bingoal WB	18
7	Sander De Pestel (BEL)	Team Flanders–Baloise	17
8	Stefano Gandin (ITA)	Team Corratec–Selle Italia	15
9	Andreas Goeman (BEL)	Tarteletto–Isorex	13
10	Logan Currie (NZL)	Bolton Equities Black Spoke	13

=== Young rider classification ===
Final young rider classification (1–10)
Rank	Rider	Team	Time
1	Mathias Vacek (CZE)	Trek–Segafredo	16h 11' 14"
2	Hugo Page (FRA)	Intermarché–Circus–Wanty	+ 1' 50"
3	Logan Currie (NZL)	Bolton Equities Black Spoke	+ 13' 51"
4	Jenno Berckmoes (BEL)	Team Flanders–Baloise	+ 17' 46"
5	Oded Kogut (ISR)	Israel–Premier Tech	+ 17' 55"
6	Thibau Nys (BEL)	Trek–Segafredo	+ 18' 27"
7	William Blume Levy (DEN)	Uno-X Pro Cycling Team	+ 19' 35"
8	Casper van Uden (NED)	Team DSM	+ 27' 19"
9	Kay De Bruyckere (BEL)	Pauwels Sauzen–Bingoal	+ 33' 58"
10	Matyáš Kopecký (CZE)	Team Novo Nordisk	+ 35' 06"

=== Team classification ===
Final team classification (1–10)
Rank	Team	Time
1	(United States) Trek–Segafredo	48h 32' 42"
2	(Belgium) Soudal–Quick-Step	+ 35"
3	(Norway) Uno-X Pro Cycling Team	+ 1' 54"
4	(Belgium) Intermarché–Circus–Wanty	+ 3' 11"
5	(Belgium) Alpecin–Deceuninck	+ 3' 21"
6	Israel–Premier Tech	+ 5' 07"
7	(Belgium) Team Flanders–Baloise	+ 5' 31"
8	(Belgium) Lotto–Dstny	+ 6' 25"
9	(Italy) Eolo–Kometa	+ 6' 51"
10	(New Zealand) Bolton Equities Black Spoke	+ 17' 34"
