= 2023 Münsterland Giro =

- 2023 UCI ProSeries

Race details
- Dates: 3 October 2023
- Stages: 1
- Distance: 194.2 km (120.7 mi)
- Winning time: 4h 21' 31"

Results
	Winner	Per Strand Hagenes (NOR)	(Team Jumbo–Visma)
	Second	Kaden Groves (AUS)	(Alpecin–Deceuninck)
	Third	Mads Pedersen (DEN)	(Lidl–Trek)

The 2023 Münsterland Giro (known as the Sparkasse Münsterland Giro for sponsorship reasons) is the 17th edition of the Münsterland Giro road cycling one day race, held mostly in the titular region of northwest Germany on 3 October 2023.

== Teams ==
Eight UCI WorldTeams, eight UCI ProTeams, six UCI Continental teams, and the German national team make up the 23 teams that will participate in the race.

UCI WorldTeams

- Alpecin–Deceuninck
- Bora–Hansgrohe
- Intermarché–Circus–Wanty
- Lidl–Trek
- Soudal–Quick-Step
- Team dsm–firmenich
- Team Jayco–AlUla
- Team Jumbo–Visma

UCI ProTeams

- Bolton Equities Black Spoke
- Lotto–Dstny
- Q36.5 Pro Cycling Team
- Team Corratec–Selle Italia
- Team Flanders–Baloise
- Team Novo Nordisk
- Tudor Pro Cycling Team
- Uno-X Pro Cycling Team

UCI Continental Teams

- Maloja Pushbikers
- P&S Benotti
- Rad-Net Oßwald
- Santic–Wibatech
- Saris Rouvy Sauerland Team
- Team Lotto–Kern Haus

National Teams

- Germany

== Result ==
Result
Rank	Rider	Team	Time
1	Per Strand Hagenes (NOR)	Team Jumbo–Visma	4h 21' 31"
2	Kaden Groves (AUS)	Alpecin–Deceuninck	+ 17"
3	Mads Pedersen (DEN)	Lidl–Trek	+ 17"
4	Nils Eekhoff (NED)	Team dsm–firmenich	+ 17"
5	Christophe Laporte (FRA)	Team Jumbo–Visma	+ 17"
6	Danny van Poppel (NED)	Bora–Hansgrohe	+ 17"
7	Søren Wærenskjold (NOR)	Uno-X Pro Cycling Team	+ 17"
8	Edoardo Affini (ITA)	Team Jumbo–Visma	+ 17"
9	Edward Planckaert (BEL)	Alpecin–Deceuninck	+ 27"
10	Jonas Koch (GER)	Bora–Hansgrohe	+ 38"
