= 2025 Omloop Het Nieuwsblad =

Bicycle race

2025 UCI World Tour, race 4 of 36
- Event poster with previous winners Jan Tratnik and Marianne Vos

Race details
- Dates: 1 March 2025
- Stages: 1
- Distance: 197 km (122 mi)
- Winning time: 4h 37' 53"

Results
	Winner	Søren Wærenskjold (NOR)	(Uno-X Mobility)
	Second	Paul Magnier (FRA)	(Soudal–Quick-Step)
	Third	Jasper Philipsen (BEL)	(Alpecin–Deceuninck)

The 2025 Omloop Het Nieuwsblad was a road cycling one-day race that took place on 1 March 2025 in Belgium, starting in Gent and finishing in Ninove. It was the 80th edition of the Omloop Het Nieuwsblad and the fourth event of the 2025 UCI World Tour.

The race was won by Norwegian rider Søren Wærenskjold of Uno-X Mobility in a sprint finish.

== Teams ==
Twenty-five teams participated in the race, including all eighteen UCI WorldTeams and seven UCI ProTeams.

UCI WorldTeams

- Alpecin–Deceuninck
- Arkéa–B&B Hotels
- Cofidis
- Decathlon–AG2R La Mondiale
- EF Education–EasyPost
- Groupama–FDJ
- Ineos Grenadiers
- Intermarché–Wanty
- Lidl–Trek
- Movistar Team
- Red Bull–Bora–Hansgrohe
- Soudal–Quick-Step
- Team Bahrain Victorious
- Team Jayco–AlUla
- Team Picnic–PostNL
- UAE Team Emirates XRG
- Visma–Lease a Bike
- XDS Astana Team

UCI ProSeries Teams

- Israel–Premier Tech
- Lotto
- Q36.5 Pro Cycling Team
- Team Flanders–Baloise
- Tudor Pro Cycling Team
- Unibet Tietema Rockets
- Uno-X Mobility

== Result ==
Result
Rank	Rider	Team	Time
1	Søren Wærenskjold (NOR)	Uno-X Mobility	4h 37' 53"
2	Paul Magnier (FRA)	Soudal–Quick-Step	+ 0"
3	Jasper Philipsen (BEL)	Alpecin–Deceuninck	+ 0"
4	Brent Van Moer (BEL)	Lotto	+ 0"
5	Samuel Watson (GBR)	Ineos Grenadiers	+ 0"
6	Lukáš Kubiš (SVK)	Unibet Tietema Rockets	+ 0"
7	Piet Allegaert (BEL)	Cofidis	+ 0"
8	Vincenzo Albanese (ITA)	EF Education–EasyPost	+ 0"
9	Marijn van den Berg (NED)	EF Education–EasyPost	+ 0"
10	Lewis Askey (GBR)	Groupama–FDJ	+ 0"
