= Mathias Vacek =

Czech cyclist

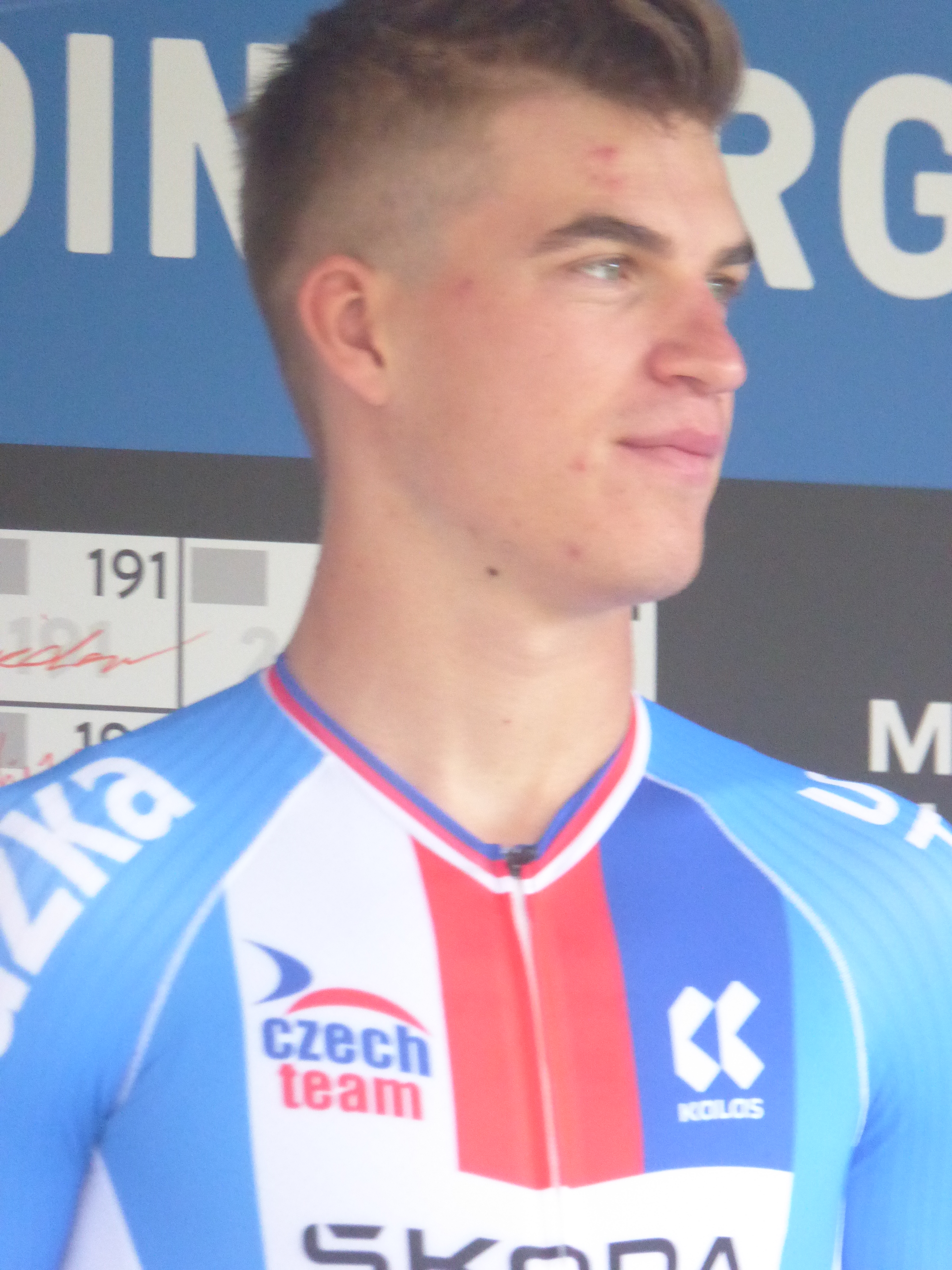
- Vacek in 2023

Personal information
- Born: 12 June 2002 (age 24) Beroun, Czech Republic

Cycling career
- Sport: Cycling
- Current team: Lidl–Trek
- Discipline: Road
- Role: Rider
- Rider type: Rouleur, Time trialist, Classic specialist, Puncheur

Amateur teams
- 2018–2020: F.lli Giorgi
- 2022: CK Příbram Fany Gastro.

Professional teams
- 2021–2022: Gazprom–RusVelo
- 2022: Trek–Segafredo (stagiaire)
- 2023–: Trek–Segafredo

Major wins
- One-day races and Classics National Road Race Championships (2023, 2025, 2026) National Time Trial Championships (2024, 2025, 2026)
Medal record
Representing Czech Republic
Men's road bicycle racing
World Championships
Silver medal – second place	2022 Wollongong	Under-23 road race
European Championships
Gold medal – first place	2020 Plouay	Junior time trial
Silver medal – second place	2022 Anadia	Under-23 road race

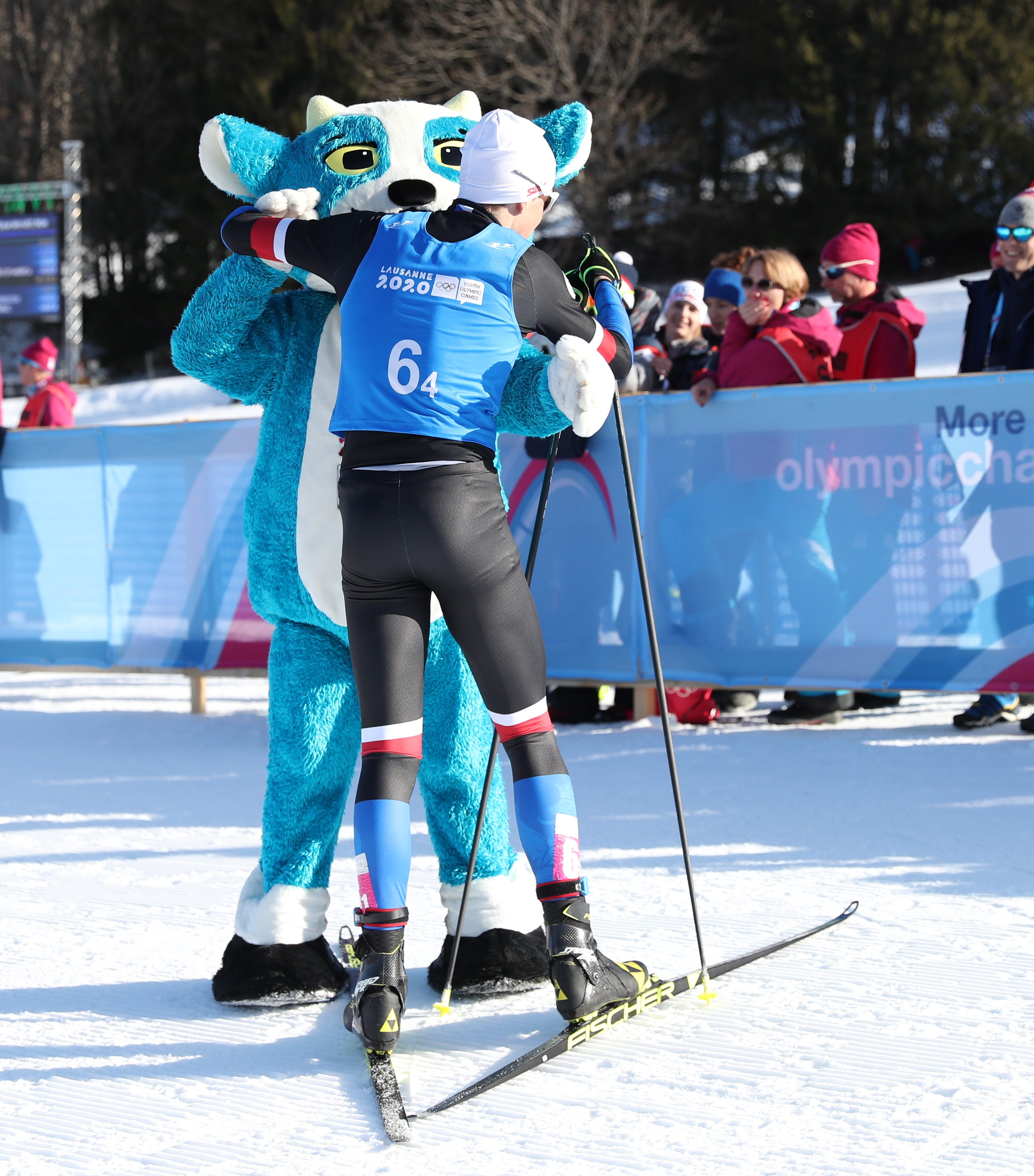
Vacek at the 2020 Winter Youth Olympics

Mathias Vacek (born 12 June 2002) is a Czech cyclist, who currently rides for UCI WorldTeam Lidl–Trek. He also competed in cross-country skiing. His older brother Karel is also a cyclist.

He joined Trek–Segafredo in 2023 after riding the second half of 2022 season as stagiaire.

== Major results ==
2019
4th Overall Saarland Trofeo
6th Road race, UEC European Junior Road Championships
2020
1st Time trial, UEC European Junior Road Championships
National Junior Road Championships

1st Time trial
2nd Road race

2021
3rd Time trial, National Under-23 Road Championships
5th Road race, National Road Championships
6th Overall Grand Prix Jeseníky
2022 (1 pro win)
1st Time trial, National Under-23 Road Championships
1st Stage 6 UAE Tour
UCI Road World Under-23 Championships

2nd Road race
9th Time trial

2nd Road race, UEC European Under-23 Road Championships
3rd Overall Grand Prix Jeseníky

1st Young rider classification
1st Prologue

6th Veneto Classic
10th Overall Tour de l'Avenir
2023 (1)
National Road Championships

1st Road race
3rd Time trial

8th Overall Tour of Norway
8th Figueira Champions Classic
9th Overall Tour of Belgium

1st Young rider classification

2024 (1)
National Road Championships

1st Time trial
5th Road race

2nd Overall Tour of Belgium

1st Young rider classification

2nd Paris–Tours
4th Overall Tour of Norway

1st Young rider classification

Vuelta a España

Held after Stages 1–3

2025 (3)
National Road Championships

1st Road race
1st Time trial

1st Stage 1 (TTT) Volta a la Comunitat Valenciana
2nd Overall Tour de Wallonie

1st Young rider classification
1st Stage 4

3rd Figueira Champions Classic
7th Time trial, UEC European Road Championships
7th Paris–Tours
Giro d'Italia

Held after Stages 2–6

2026 (5)
National Road Championships

1st Road race
1st Time trial

1st Overall ZLM Tour

1st Stages 1 (ITT) & 2

3rd Overall Tour de Suisse

1st Young rider classification

5th Overall Deutschland Tour
Tour de France

Held after Stages 4–5

=== Grand Tour general classification results timeline ===
Grand Tour	2024	2025	2026
Giro d'Italia	—	57	—
Tour de France	—	—	49
Vuelta a España	61	—	—

Legend
—	Did not compete
DNF	Did not finish
