= 2025 Deutschland Tour =

2025 UCI ProSeries

Race details
- Dates: 20–24 August 2025
- Stages: 4 + Prologue
- Distance: 735.4 km (457.0 mi)

Results
| Jersey awarded to the overall winner | Winner | Søren Wærenskjold (NOR) | (Uno-X Mobility) |
| | Second | Jhonatan Narváez (ECU) | (UAE Team Emirates XRG) |
| | Third | Riley Sheehan (USA) | (Israel–Premier Tech) |
| Jersey awarded to the points classification winner | Points | Søren Wærenskjold (NOR) | (Uno-X Mobility) |
| Jersey awarded to the mountains classification winner | Mountains | Enzo Leijnse (NED) | (Team Picnic–PostNL) |
| Jersey awarded to the young rider classification winner | Young rider | Søren Wærenskjold (NOR) | (Uno-X Mobility) |
| Jersey awarded to the team classification winner | Team | (United Arab Emirates) UAE Team Emirates XRG | |

The 2025 Deutschland Tour was a men's road cycling stage race which took place from 20 to 24 August 2025. It was the 39th edition of the Deutschland Tour, which is rated as a 2.Pro event on the 2025 UCI ProSeries calendar.

== Teams ==
11 of the 18 UCI WorldTeams, five UCI ProTeams and two UCI Continental teams made up the eighteen teams in the race.

UCI WorldTeams

- Alpecin–Deceuninck
- INEOS Grenadiers
- Intermarché–Wanty
- Lidl–Trek
- Movistar Team
- Red Bull–Bora–Hansgrohe
- Soudal–Quick-Step
- Team Bahrain Victorious
- Team Picnic–PostNL
- UAE Team Emirates XRG
- Visma–Lease a Bike

UCI ProTeams

- Israel–Premier Tech
- Q36.5 Pro Cycling Team
- Team TotalEnergies
- Tudor Pro Cycling Team
- Uno-X Mobility

UCI Continental Teams

- Bike Aid
- Rembe / Rad-Net

== Schedule ==
Stage characteristics and winners
| Stage | Date | Route | Distance | Type | Stage winner |
|---|---|---|---|---|---|
| P | 20 August | Essen | 3.1 km (1.9 mi) | Individual time trial | Søren Wærenskjold (NOR) |
| 1 | 21 August | Essen to Herford | 202.6 km (125.9 mi) | Hilly stage | Matthew Brennan (GBR) |
| 2 | 22 August | Herford to Arnsberg | 190.3 km (118.2 mi) | Hilly stage | Jhonatan Narváez (ECU) |
| 3 | 23 August | Arnsberg to Kassel | 175.7 km (109.2 mi) | Hilly stage | Søren Wærenskjold (NOR) |
| 4 | 24 August | Halle (Saale) to Magdeburg | 163.7 km (101.7 mi) | Flat stage | Matthew Brennan (GBR) |
| Total | | | 735.4 km (457.0 mi) | | |

== Stages ==
=== Prologue ===
20 August 2025 – Essen, 3.1 km (1.9 mi)

Prologue Result
| Rank | Rider | Team | Time |
|---|---|---|---|
| 1 | Søren Wærenskjold (NOR) | Uno-X Mobility | 3' 31" |
| 2 | Samuel Watson (GBR) | INEOS Grenadiers | + 1" |
| 3 | Marco Haller (AUT) | Tudor Pro Cycling Team | + 2" |
| 4 | Laurence Pithie (NZL) | Red Bull–Bora–Hansgrohe | + 3" |
| 5 | Wout van Aert (BEL) | Visma–Lease a Bike | + 3" |
| 6 | Danny van Poppel (NED) | Red Bull–Bora–Hansgrohe | + 3" |
| 7 | Maikel Zijlaard (NED) | Tudor Pro Cycling Team | + 3" |
| 8 | Vlad Van Mechelen (BEL) | Team Bahrain Victorious | + 4" |
| 9 | Erik Resell (NOR) | Uno-X Mobility | + 5" |
| 10 | Pascal Eenkhoorn (NED) | Soudal–Quick-Step | + 5" |

General classification after Prologue
| Rank | Rider | Team | Time |
|---|---|---|---|
| 1 | Søren Wærenskjold (NOR) | Uno-X Mobility | 3' 31" |
| 2 | Samuel Watson (GBR) | INEOS Grenadiers | + 1" |
| 3 | Marco Haller (AUT) | Tudor Pro Cycling Team | + 2" |
| 4 | Laurence Pithie (NZL) | Red Bull–Bora–Hansgrohe | + 3" |
| 5 | Wout van Aert (BEL) | Visma–Lease a Bike | + 3" |
| 6 | Danny van Poppel (NED) | Red Bull–Bora–Hansgrohe | + 3" |
| 7 | Maikel Zijlaard (NED) | Tudor Pro Cycling Team | + 3" |
| 8 | Vlad Van Mechelen (BEL) | Team Bahrain Victorious | + 4" |
| 9 | Erik Resell (NOR) | Uno-X Mobility | + 5" |
| 10 | Pascal Eenkhoorn (NED) | Soudal–Quick-Step | + 5" |

=== Stage 1 ===
21 August 2025 – Essen to Herford, 202.6 km (125.9 mi)

Stage 1 Result
| Rank | Rider | Team | Time |
|---|---|---|---|
| 1 | Matthew Brennan (GBR) | Visma–Lease a Bike | 4h 37' 08" |
| 2 | Jonathan Milan (ITA) | Lidl–Trek | + 0" |
| 3 | Danny van Poppel (NED) | Red Bull–Bora–Hansgrohe | + 0" |
| 4 | Emilien Jeannière (FRA) | Team TotalEnergies | + 0" |
| 5 | Hugo Hofstetter (FRA) | Israel–Premier Tech | + 0" |
| 6 | Maikel Zijlaard (NED) | Tudor Pro Cycling Team | + 0" |
| 7 | Kaden Groves (AUS) | Alpecin–Deceuninck | + 0" |
| 8 | Søren Wærenskjold (NOR) | Uno-X Mobility | + 0" |
| 9 | Thom van der Werff (NED) | Team Picnic–PostNL | + 0" |
| 10 | Jonathan Malte Rottmann (GER) | Rembe / Rad-Net | + 0" |

General classification after Stage 1
| Rank | Rider | Team | Time |
|---|---|---|---|
| 1 | Danny van Poppel (NED) | Red Bull–Bora–Hansgrohe | 4h 40' 38" |
| 2 | Samuel Watson (GBR) | INEOS Grenadiers | + 0" |
| 3 | Matthew Brennan (GBR) | Visma–Lease a Bike | + 0" |
| 4 | Wout van Aert (BEL) | Visma–Lease a Bike | + 1" |
| 5 | Jonathan Milan (ITA) | Lidl–Trek | + 1" |
| 6 | Søren Wærenskjold (NOR) | Uno-X Mobility | + 1" |
| 7 | Marco Haller (AUT) | Tudor Pro Cycling Team | + 3" |
| 8 | Laurence Pithie (NZL) | Red Bull–Bora–Hansgrohe | + 4" |
| 9 | Maikel Zijlaard (NED) | Tudor Pro Cycling Team | + 4" |
| 10 | Vlad Van Mechelen (BEL) | Team Bahrain Victorious | + 5" |

=== Stage 2 ===
22 August 2025 – Herford to Arnsberg, 190.3 km (118.2 mi)

Stage 2 Result
| Rank | Rider | Team | Time |
|---|---|---|---|
| 1 | Jhonatan Narváez (ECU) | UAE Team Emirates XRG | 4h 27' 10" |
| 2 | Riley Sheehan (USA) | Israel–Premier Tech | + 0" |
| 3 | Søren Wærenskjold (NOR) | Uno-X Mobility | + 0" |
| 4 | Marius Mayrhofer (GER) | Tudor Pro Cycling Team | + 8" |
| 5 | Jonathan Milan (ITA) | Lidl–Trek | + 14" |
| 6 | Danny van Poppel (NED) | Red Bull–Bora–Hansgrohe | + 14" |
| 7 | Emilien Jeannière (FRA) | Team TotalEnergies | + 14" |
| 8 | Matthew Brennan (GBR) | Visma–Lease a Bike | + 14" |
| 9 | Marco Haller (AUT) | Tudor Pro Cycling Team | + 14" |
| 10 | Hugo Hofstetter (FRA) | Israel–Premier Tech | + 14" |

General classification after Stage 2
| Rank | Rider | Team | Time |
|---|---|---|---|
| 1 | Søren Wærenskjold (NOR) | Uno-X Mobility | 9h 07' 45" |
| 2 | Jhonatan Narváez (ECU) | UAE Team Emirates XRG | + 1" |
| 3 | Riley Sheehan (USA) | Israel–Premier Tech | + 4" |
| 4 | Wout van Aert (BEL) | Visma–Lease a Bike | + 15" |
| 5 | Danny van Poppel (NED) | Red Bull–Bora–Hansgrohe | + 17" |
| 6 | Samuel Watson (GBR) | INEOS Grenadiers | + 17" |
| 7 | Matthew Brennan (GBR) | Visma–Lease a Bike | + 17" |
| 8 | Marius Mayrhofer (GER) | Tudor Pro Cycling Team | + 18" |
| 9 | Jonathan Milan (ITA) | Lidl–Trek | + 18" |
| 10 | Laurence Pithie (NZL) | Red Bull–Bora–Hansgrohe | + 20" |

=== Stage 3 ===
23 August 2025 – Arnsberg to Kassel, 175.7 km (109.2 mi)

Stage 3 Result
| Rank | Rider | Team | Time |
|---|---|---|---|
| 1 | Søren Wærenskjold (NOR) | Uno-X Mobility | 3h 53' 10" |
| 2 | Emilien Jeannière (FRA) | Team TotalEnergies | + 0" |
| 3 | Samuel Watson (GBR) | INEOS Grenadiers | + 0" |
| 4 | Riley Sheehan (USA) | Israel–Premier Tech | + 0" |
| 5 | Jon Barrenetxea (ESP) | Movistar Team | + 0" |
| 6 | Andrea Raccagni Noviero (ITA) | Soudal–Quick-Step | + 0" |
| 7 | Matthew Brennan (GBR) | Visma–Lease a Bike | + 0" |
| 8 | Edoardo Zambanini (ITA) | Team Bahrain Victorious | + 0" |
| 9 | Marco Haller (AUT) | Tudor Pro Cycling Team | + 0" |
| 10 | Marius Mayrhofer (GER) | Tudor Pro Cycling Team | + 0" |

General classification after Stage 3
| Rank | Rider | Team | Time |
|---|---|---|---|
| 1 | Søren Wærenskjold (NOR) | Uno-X Mobility | 13h 00' 43" |
| 2 | Jhonatan Narváez (ECU) | UAE Team Emirates XRG | + 10" |
| 3 | Riley Sheehan (USA) | Israel–Premier Tech | + 16" |
| 4 | Samuel Watson (GBR) | INEOS Grenadiers | + 25" |
| 5 | Wout van Aert (BEL) | Visma–Lease a Bike | + 27" |
| 6 | Danny van Poppel (NED) | Red Bull–Bora–Hansgrohe | + 29" |
| 7 | Matthew Brennan (GBR) | Visma–Lease a Bike | + 29" |
| 8 | Marius Mayrhofer (GER) | Tudor Pro Cycling Team | + 30" |
| 9 | Marco Haller (AUT) | Tudor Pro Cycling Team | + 31" |
| 10 | Pascal Eenkhoorn (NED) | Soudal–Quick-Step | + 35" |

=== Stage 4 ===
24 August 2025 – Halle (Saale) to Magdeburg, 163.7 km (101.7 mi)

Stage 4 Result
| Rank | Rider | Team | Time |
|---|---|---|---|
| 1 | Matthew Brennan (GBR) | Visma–Lease a Bike | 3h 29' 21" |
| 2 | Søren Wærenskjold (NOR) | Uno-X Mobility | + 0" |
| 3 | Jonathan Milan (ITA) | Lidl–Trek | + 0" |
| 4 | Jordi Meeus (BEL) | Red Bull–Bora–Hansgrohe | + 0" |
| 5 | Žak Eržen (SLO) | Team Bahrain Victorious | + 0" |
| 6 | Luke Lamperti (USA) | Soudal–Quick-Step | + 0" |
| 7 | Henri Uhlig (GER) | Alpecin–Deceuninck | + 0" |
| 8 | Marius Mayrhofer (GER) | Tudor Pro Cycling Team | + 0" |
| 9 | Laurence Pithie (NZL) | Red Bull–Bora–Hansgrohe | + 0" |
| 10 | Fabio Van den Bossche (BEL) | Alpecin–Deceuninck | + 0" |

General classification after Stage 4
| Rank | Rider | Team | Time |
|---|---|---|---|
| 1 | Søren Wærenskjold (NOR) | Uno-X Mobility | 16h 29' 58" |
| 2 | Jhonatan Narváez (ECU) | UAE Team Emirates XRG | + 16" |
| 3 | Riley Sheehan (USA) | Israel–Premier Tech | + 19" |
| 4 | Matthew Brennan (GBR) | Visma–Lease a Bike | + 25" |
| 5 | Samuel Watson (GBR) | INEOS Grenadiers | + 31" |
| 6 | Wout van Aert (BEL) | Visma–Lease a Bike | + 33" |
| 7 | Marius Mayrhofer (GER) | Tudor Pro Cycling Team | + 35" |
| 8 | Danny van Poppel (NED) | Red Bull–Bora–Hansgrohe | + 35" |
| 9 | Marco Haller (AUT) | Tudor Pro Cycling Team | + 37" |
| 10 | Pascal Eenkhoorn (NED) | Soudal–Quick-Step | + 41" |

== Classification leadership table ==
Classification leadership by stage
| Stage | Winner | General classification | Points classification | Mountains classification | Young rider classification | Team classification |
|---|---|---|---|---|---|---|
| P | Søren Wærenskjold | Søren Wærenskjold | Søren Wærenskjold | Not awarded | Søren Wærenskjold | Tudor Pro Cycling Team |
| 1 | Matthew Brennan | Danny van Poppel | Matthew Brennan | Miguel Heidemann | Samuel Watson | Tudor Pro Cycling Team |
| 2 | Jhonatan Narváez | Søren Wærenskjold | Søren Wærenskjold | Miguel Heidemann | Søren Wærenskjold | Uno-X Mobility |
| 3 | Søren Wærenskjold | Søren Wærenskjold | Søren Wærenskjold | Miguel Heidemann | Søren Wærenskjold | UAE Team Emirates XRG |
| 4 | Matthew Brennan | Søren Wærenskjold | Søren Wærenskjold | Enzo Leijnse | Søren Wærenskjold | UAE Team Emirates XRG |
| Final | | Søren Wærenskjold | Søren Wærenskjold | Enzo Leijnse | Søren Wærenskjold | UAE Team Emirates XRG |

== Classification standings ==
Legend
| Denotes the leader of the general classification | Denotes the leader of the mountains classification |
| Denotes the leader of the points classification | Denotes the leader of the young rider classification |

=== General classification ===
Final general classification (1–10)
| Rank | Rider | Team | Time |
|---|---|---|---|
| 1 | Søren Wærenskjold (NOR) | Uno-X Mobility | 16h 29' 58" |
| 2 | Jhonatan Narváez (ECU) | UAE Team Emirates XRG | + 16" |
| 3 | Riley Sheehan (USA) | Israel–Premier Tech | + 19" |
| 4 | Matthew Brennan (GBR) | Visma–Lease a Bike | + 25" |
| 5 | Samuel Watson (GBR) | INEOS Grenadiers | + 31" |
| 6 | Wout van Aert (BEL) | Visma–Lease a Bike | + 33" |
| 7 | Marius Mayrhofer (GER) | Tudor Pro Cycling Team | + 35" |
| 8 | Danny van Poppel (NED) | Red Bull–Bora–Hansgrohe | + 35" |
| 9 | Marco Haller (AUT) | Tudor Pro Cycling Team | + 37" |
| 10 | Pascal Eenkhoorn (NED) | Soudal–Quick-Step | + 41" |

=== Points classification ===
Final points classification (1–10)
| Rank | Rider | Team | Points |
|---|---|---|---|
| 1 | Søren Wærenskjold (NOR) | Uno-X Mobility | 54 |
| 2 | Matthew Brennan (GBR) | Visma–Lease a Bike | 42 |
| 3 | Jonathan Milan (ITA) | Lidl–Trek | 27 |
| 4 | Emilien Jeannière (FRA) | Team TotalEnergies | 23 |
| 5 | Riley Sheehan (USA) | Israel–Premier Tech | 19 |
| 6 | Samuel Watson (GBR) | INEOS Grenadiers | 17 |
| 7 | Jhonatan Narváez (ECU) | UAE Team Emirates XRG | 15 |
| 8 | Danny van Poppel (NED) | Red Bull–Bora–Hansgrohe | 13 |
| 9 | Marius Mayrhofer (GER) | Tudor Pro Cycling Team | 11 |
| 10 | Vinzent Dorn (GER) | Bike Aid | 10 |

=== Mountains classification ===
Final mountains classification (1–10)
| Rank | Rider | Team | Points |
|---|---|---|---|
| 1 | Enzo Leijnse (NED) | Team Picnic–PostNL | 11 |
| 2 | Vinzent Dorn (GER) | Bike Aid | 11 |
| 3 | Miguel Heidemann (GER) | Rembe / Rad-Net | 10 |
| 4 | Jonas Rutsch (GER) | Intermarché–Wanty | 8 |
| 5 | Marco Haller (AUT) | Tudor Pro Cycling Team | 5 |
| 6 | Jannik Steimle (GER) | Q36.5 Pro Cycling Team | 4 |
| 7 | Emīls Liepiņš (LAT) | Q36.5 Pro Cycling Team | 4 |
| 8 | Brandon McNulty (USA) | UAE Team Emirates XRG | 3 |
| 9 | Andrew August (USA) | INEOS Grenadiers | 2 |
| 10 | Vincent Bodet (FRA) | Team Picnic–PostNL | 2 |

=== Young rider classification ===
Final young rider classification (1–10)
| Rank | Rider | Team | Time |
|---|---|---|---|
| 1 | Søren Wærenskjold (NOR) | Uno-X Mobility | 16h 29' 58" |
| 2 | Riley Sheehan (USA) | Israel–Premier Tech | + 19" |
| 3 | Matthew Brennan (GBR) | Visma–Lease a Bike | + 25" |
| 4 | Samuel Watson (GBR) | INEOS Grenadiers | + 31" |
| 5 | Marius Mayrhofer (GER) | Tudor Pro Cycling Team | + 35" |
| 6 | Edoardo Zambanini (ITA) | Team Bahrain Victorious | + 41" |
| 7 | Iván Romeo (ESP) | Movistar Team | + 41" |
| 8 | Ilan Van Wilder (BEL) | Soudal–Quick-Step | + 43" |
| 9 | Andrea Raccagni (ITA) | Soudal–Quick-Step | + 43" |
| 10 | Gil Gelders (BEL) | Soudal–Quick-Step | + 44" |

=== Team classification ===
Final team classification (1–10)
| Rank | Team | Time |
|---|---|---|
| 1 | (United Arab Emirates) UAE Team Emirates XRG | 49h 31' 46" |
| 2 | (Belgium) Soudal–Quick-Step | + 13" |
| 3 | Israel–Premier Tech | + 14" |
| 4 | (Netherlands) Visma–Lease a Bike | + 18" |
| 5 | (France) Team TotalEnergies | + 30" |
| 6 | (Switzerland) Tudor Pro Cycling Team | + 4' 06" |
| 7 | (Spain) Movistar Team | + 5' 25" |
| 8 | (Germany) Red Bull–Bora–Hansgrohe | + 13' 32" |
| 9 | (Norway) Uno-X Mobility | + 21' 47" |
| 10 | Team Bahrain Victorious | + 22' 13" |
