= 2023 Cadel Evans Great Ocean Road Race =

Cycling race

2023 UCI World Tour, race 2 of 35
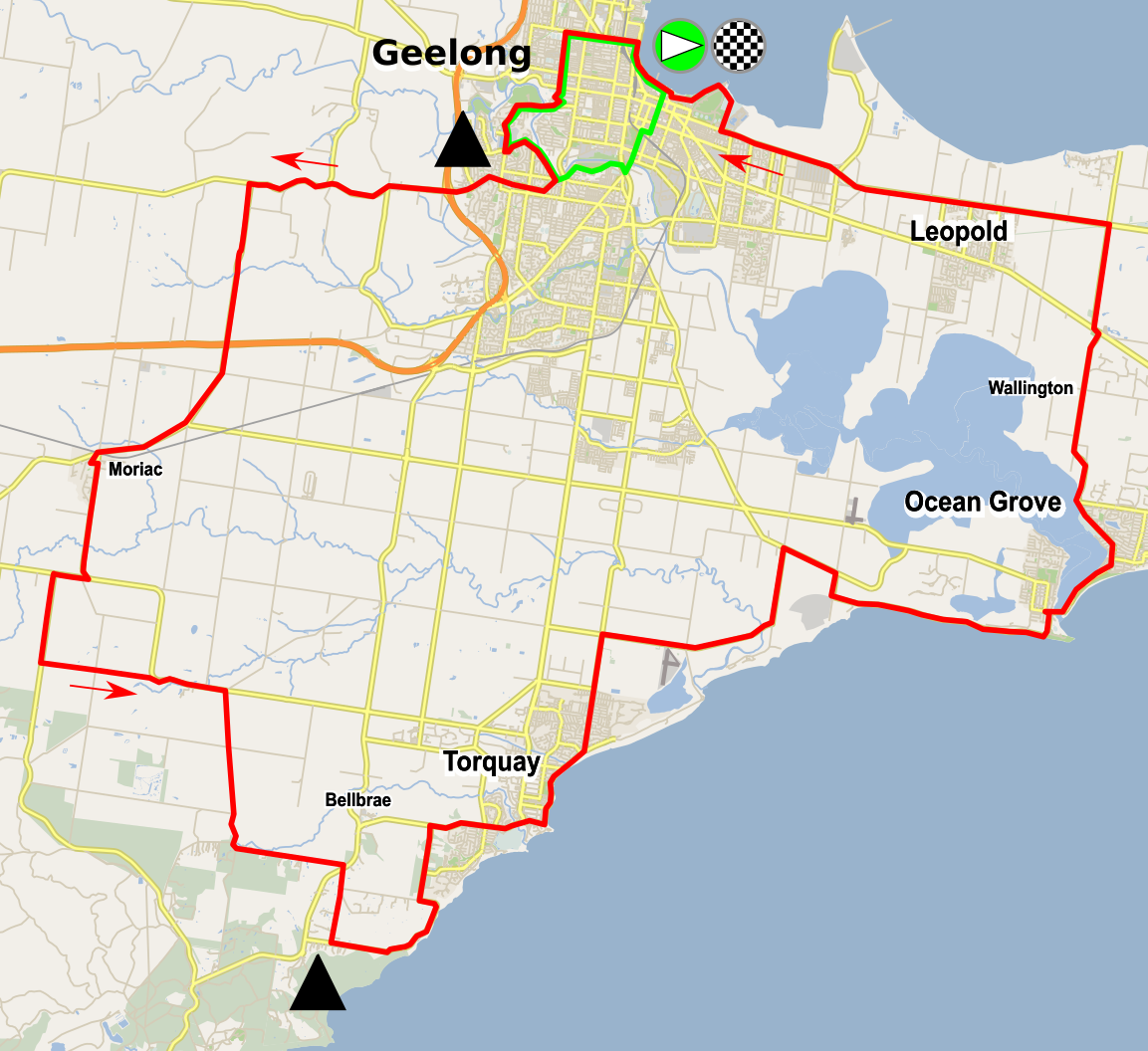
- Route map

Race details
- Dates: 29 January 2023
- Stages: 1
- Distance: 174.3 km (108.3 mi)
- Winning time: 4h 15' 11"

Results
	Winner	Marius Mayrhofer (GER)	(Team DSM)
	Second	Hugo Page (FRA)	(Intermarché–Circus–Wanty)
	Third	Simon Clarke (AUS)	(Israel–Premier Tech)

The 2023 Cadel Evans Great Ocean Road Race was a road cycling race that was held on 29 January 2023 in Geelong, Australia. It was the seventh edition of the Cadel Evans Great Ocean Road Race and the second event of the 2023 UCI World Tour.

== Teams ==
Fourteen teams entered the race, including eleven of the eighteen UCI WorldTeams, two UCI ProSeries teams, and the Australian national team. Each team entered seven riders, except for Team DSM, which entered six. Of the starting peloton of 94 riders, 83 finished.

UCI WorldTeams

- AG2R Citroën Team
- Arkéa–Samsic
- Bora–Hansgrohe
- EF Education–EasyPost
- INEOS Grenadiers
- Intermarché–Circus–Wanty
- Soudal–Quick-Step
- Team Jayco–AlUla
- Team DSM
- Trek–Segafredo
- UAE Team Emirates

UCI ProTeams

- Bolton Equities Black Spoke
- Israel–Premier Tech

National Teams

- Australia

== Route ==
The race started and finished in Geelong, Victoria using a 174.3 kilometres (108.3 mi) course. Starting from Geelong, the course travelled through the Bellarine Peninsula and Surf Coast, before returning to Geelong for four loops of a circuit around the city. This circuit featured the 830m Challambra climb with an average gradient of 8.9%, as used in the 2010 UCI Road World Championships.

== Result ==
Result
Rank	Rider	Team	Time
1	Marius Mayrhofer (GER)	Team DSM	4h 15' 11"
2	Hugo Page (FRA)	Intermarché–Circus–Wanty	+ 0"
3	Simon Clarke (AUS)	Israel–Premier Tech	+ 0"
4	Michael Matthews (AUS)	Team Jayco–AlUla	+ 0"
5	Corbin Strong (NZL)	Israel–Premier Tech	+ 0"
6	Caleb Ewan (AUS)	Australia	+ 0"
7	Dion Smith (AUS)	Intermarché–Circus–Wanty	+ 0"
8	Marc Hirschi (SUI)	UAE Team Emirates	+ 0"
9	George Bennett (NZL)	UAE Team Emirates	+ 0"
10	Sean Quinn (USA)	EF Education–EasyPost	+ 0"
