= 2025 Figueira Champions Classic =

2025 UCI ProSeries

Race details
- Dates: 16 February 2025
- Stages: 1
- Distance: 192.7 km (119.7 mi)
- Winning time: 4h 35' 47"

Results
	Winner	António Morgado (POR)	(UAE Team Emirates XRG)
	Second	Paul Magnier (FRA)	(Soudal–Quick-Step)
	Third	Mathias Vacek (CZE)	(Lidl–Trek)

The 2025 Figueira Champions Classic is the 3rd edition of the Figueira Champions Classic single-day cycling race. It was held on 16 February 2025 over a distance of 192.7 km, starting and ending in Figueira da Foz.

== Teams ==
Ten UCI WorldTeams, four UCI ProTeams, and nine UCI Continental teams made up the twenty-three teams that participated in the race.

UCI WorldTeams

- Alpecin–Deceuninck
- Cofidis
- EF Education–EasyPost
- Ineos Grenadiers
- Intermarché–Wanty
- Lidl–Trek
- Movistar Team
- Soudal–Quick-Step
- Team Picnic–PostNL
- UAE Team Emirates XRG

UCI ProTeams

- Caja Rural–Seguros RGA
- Equipo Kern Pharma
- Euskaltel–Euskadi
- Tudor Pro Cycling Team

UCI Continental teams

- Anicolor / Tien 21
- AP Hotels & Resorts / Tavira / SC Farense
- Aviludo–Louletano–Loulé
- Credibom / LA Alumínios / Marcos Car
- Efapel Cycling
- Feirense–Beeceler
- GI Group Holding–Simoldes–UDO
- Rádio Popular–Paredes–Boavista
- Tavfer–Ovos Matinados–Mortágua

== Results ==
Result
Rank	Rider	Team	Time
1	António Morgado (POR)	UAE Team Emirates XRG	4h 35' 47"
2	Paul Magnier (FRA)	Soudal–Quick-Step	+ 5"
3	Mathias Vacek (CZE)	Lidl–Trek	+ 5"
4	Samuel Watson (GBR)	Ineos Grenadiers	+ 5"
5	Rui Costa (POR)	EF Education–EasyPost	+ 5"
6	Biniam Girmay (ERI)	Intermarché–Wanty	+ 5"
7	Quinten Hermans (BEL)	Alpecin–Deceuninck	+ 5"
8	Julian Alaphilippe (FRA)	Tudor Pro Cycling Team	+ 5"
9	Ruben Guerreiro (POR)	Movistar Team	+ 5"
10	Lorenzo Rota (ITA)	Intermarché–Wanty	+ 5"
