= Marius Mayrhofer =

German cyclist (born 2000)

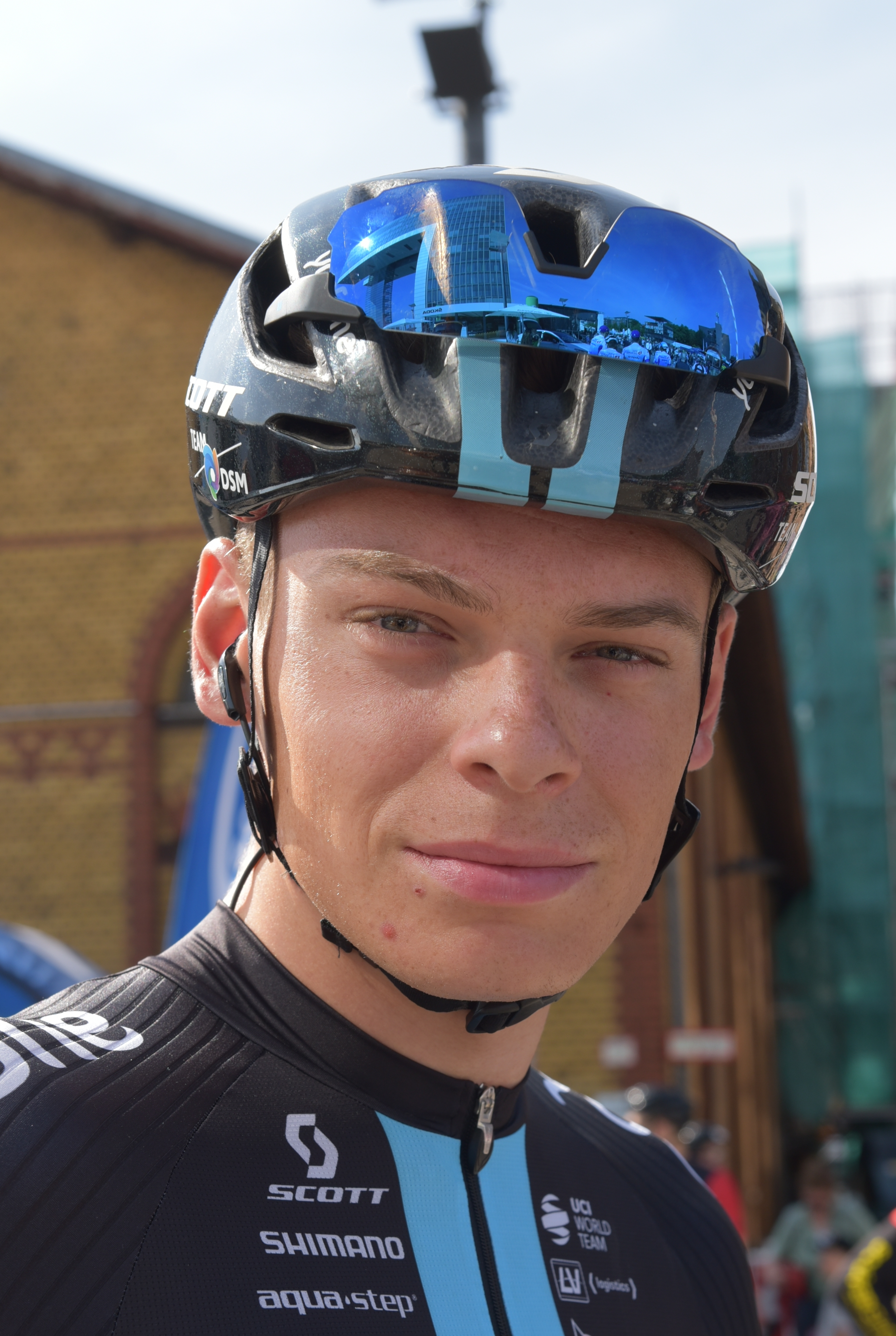
- Mayrhofer (2022)

Personal information
- Born: 18 September 2000 (age 26) Tübingen, Germany
- Height: 1.82 m (6 ft 0 in)
- Weight: 70 kg (154 lb)

Cycling career
- Sport: Cycling
- Current team: Tudor Pro Cycling Team
- Discipline: Road
- Role: Rider

Amateur teams
- 2011–2013: RV Radlerlust Gomaringen–Hinterweiler
- 2014: TSV Betzingen
- 2015: RV Radlerlust Gomaringen–Hinterweiler
- 2016–2018: RSC Linden

Professional teams
- 2019–2021: Development Team DSM
- 2022–2023: Team DSM
- 2024–: Tudor Pro Cycling Team

Major wins
- One-day races and Classics Great Ocean Road Race (2023)

Marius Mayrhofer (born 18 September 2000) is a German cyclist, who currently rides for UCI ProTeam Tudor Pro Cycling Team.

== Major results ==
2017
1st Road race, National Junior Road Championships
1st Stage 2 Oberösterreich Juniorenrundfahrt
2018
1st Grand Prix Bob Jungels
1st Trofeo comune di Vertova
2nd Road race, UCI Junior Road World Championships
6th Johan Museeuw Classic
7th Overall Giro della Lunigiana
8th Overall Oberösterreich Juniorenrundfahrt

1st Points classification
1st Stage 1

10th Overall Course de la Paix Juniors

1st Stages 1 & 2b

2020
5th Road race, National Road Championships
2021
9th Overall Kreiz Breizh Elites
10th Grote Prijs Marcel Kint
10th Per Sempre Alfredo
2023 (1 pro win)
1st Cadel Evans Great Ocean Road Race
5th Schwalbe Classic
2024
2nd Trofeo Pollença–Port d'Andratx
5th Figueira Champions Classic
7th Trofeo Calvià
9th Kuurne–Brussels–Kuurne
2025 (1)
1st Stage 3 Boucles de la Mayenne
3rd Maryland Cycling Classic
7th Overall Deutschland Tour
2026
8th Classique Dunkerque

=== Grand Tour general classification results timeline ===
Grand Tour	2023	2024
Giro d'Italia	74	DNF
Tour de France	—	—
Vuelta a España	—	—
