= 2024 Tour of Belgium =

2024 UCI ProSeries

Race details
- Dates: 12–16 June 2024
- Stages: 5
- Distance: 747.7 km (464.6 mi)
- Winning time: 16h 27' 19"

Results
Jersey awarded to the overall winner	Winner	Søren Wærenskjold (NOR)	(Uno-X Mobility)
	Second	Mathias Vacek (CZE)	(Lidl–Trek)
	Third	Alex Aranburu (ESP)	(Movistar Team)
Jersey awarded to the points classification winner	Points	Jasper Philipsen (BEL)	(Alpecin–Deceuninck)
Jersey awarded to the youth classification winner	Youth	Mathias Vacek (CZE)	(Lidl–Trek)
Jersey awarded to the combativity classification winner	Combativity	Jago Willems (BEL)	(VolkerWessels Women's Pro Cycling Team)
	Team	(Spain) Movistar Team	

The 2024 Tour of Belgium (known as the 2024 Baloise Belgium Tour for sponsorship purposes) was the 93rd edition of the Tour of Belgium road cycling stage race, which took place from 12 to 16 June 2024. The category 2.Pro event formed a part of the 2024 UCI ProSeries.

== Teams ==
Nine UCI WorldTeams, nine UCI ProTeams, and six UCI Continental teams made up the twenty-four teams that participated in the race.

UCI WorldTeams

- Alpecin–Deceuninck
- Arkéa–B&B Hotels
- Decathlon–AG2R La Mondiale
- Intermarché–Wanty
- Lidl–Trek
- Movistar Team
- Soudal–Quick-Step
- Team dsm–firmenich PostNL
- Visma–Lease a Bike

UCI ProTeams

- Bingoal WB
- Israel–Premier Tech
- Lotto–Dstny
- Polti–Kometa
- TDT–Unibet Cycling Team
- Team Flanders–Baloise
- Team Novo Nordisk
- Team TotalEnergies
- Uno-X Mobility

UCI Continental Teams

- Baloise–Trek Lions
- BEAT Cycling Club
- Pauwels Sauzen–Bingoal
- Philippe Wagner–Bazin
- Tarteletto–Isorex
- VolkerWessels Women's Pro Cycling Team

== Route ==
Stage characteristics and winners
Stage	Date	Course	Distance	Type	Stage winner
1	12 June	Beringen to Beringen	12 km (7.5 mi)	Individual time trial	Søren Wærenskjold (NOR)
2	13 June	Merelbeke to Knokke-Heist	184.2 km (114.5 mi)	Flat stage	Tim Merlier (BEL)
3	14 June	Turnhout to Scherpenheuvel-Zichem	188.3 km (117.0 mi)	Hilly stage	Jasper Philipsen (BEL)
4	15 June	Durbuy to Durbuy	177 km (110 mi)	Hilly stage	Alex Aranburu (ESP)
5	16 June	Brussels to Brussels	186.2 km (115.7 mi)	Flat stage	Tim Merlier (BEL)
Total			747.7 km (464.6 mi)		

== Stages ==
=== Stage 1 ===
12 June 2024 — Beringen to Beringen, 12 km (7.5 mi) (ITT)

Stage 1 Result
Rank	Rider	Team	Time
1	Søren Wærenskjold (NOR)	Uno-X Mobility	13' 24"
2	Mathias Vacek (CZE)	Lidl–Trek	+ 2"
3	Rune Herregodts (BEL)	Intermarché–Wanty	+ 10"
4	Edoardo Affini (ITA)	Visma–Lease a Bike	+ 11"
5	Alec Segaert (BEL)	Lotto–Dstny	+ 12"
6	Kasper Asgreen (DEN)	Soudal–Quick-Step	+ 14"
7	Alex Aranburu (ESP)	Movistar Team	+ 17"
8	Jasper Stuyven (BEL)	Lidl–Trek	+ 17"
9	Daan Hoole (NED)	Lidl–Trek	+ 18"
10	Josef Černý (CZE)	Soudal–Quick-Step	+ 21"

General classification after Stage 1
Rank	Rider	Team	Time
1	Søren Wærenskjold (NOR)	Uno-X Mobility	13' 24"
2	Mathias Vacek (CZE)	Lidl–Trek	+ 2"
3	Rune Herregodts (BEL)	Intermarché–Wanty	+ 10"
4	Edoardo Affini (ITA)	Visma–Lease a Bike	+ 11"
5	Alec Segaert (BEL)	Lotto–Dstny	+ 12"
6	Kasper Asgreen (DEN)	Soudal–Quick-Step	+ 14"
7	Alex Aranburu (ESP)	Movistar Team	+ 17"
8	Jasper Stuyven (BEL)	Lidl–Trek	+ 17"
9	Daan Hoole (NED)	Lidl–Trek	+ 18"
10	Josef Černý (CZE)	Soudal–Quick-Step	+ 21"

=== Stage 2 ===
13 June 2024 — Merelbeke to Knokke-Heist, 184.2 km (114.5 mi)

Stage 2 Result
Rank	Rider	Team	Time
1	Tim Merlier (BEL)	Soudal–Quick-Step	3h 59' 22"
2	Jasper Philipsen (BEL)	Alpecin–Deceuninck	+ 0"
3	Olav Kooij (NED)	Visma–Lease a Bike	+ 0"
4	Pierre Barbier (FRA)	Philippe Wagner–Bazin	+ 0"
5	Lionel Taminiaux (BEL)	Lotto–Dstny	+ 0"
6	Mike Teunissen (NED)	Intermarché–Wanty	+ 0"
7	Søren Wærenskjold (NOR)	Uno-X Mobility	+ 0"
8	Edward Theuns (BEL)	Lidl–Trek	+ 0"
9	Gerben Thijssen (BEL)	Intermarché–Wanty	+ 0"
10	Matyáš Kopecký (CZE)	Team Novo Nordisk	+ 0"

General classification after Stage 2
Rank	Rider	Team	Time
1	Søren Wærenskjold (NOR)	Uno-X Mobility	4h 12' 43"
2	Mathias Vacek (CZE)	Lidl–Trek	+ 2"
3	Rune Herregodts (BEL)	Intermarché–Wanty	+ 13"
4	Alec Segaert (BEL)	Lotto–Dstny	+ 15"
5	Jasper Stuyven (BEL)	Lidl–Trek	+ 17"
6	Kasper Asgreen (DEN)	Soudal–Quick-Step	+ 17"
7	Alex Aranburu (ESP)	Movistar Team	+ 19"
8	Daan Hoole (NED)	Lidl–Trek	+ 21"
9	Josef Černý (CZE)	Soudal–Quick-Step	+ 24"
10	Quentin Bezza (FRA)	Philippe Wagner–Bazin	+ 24"

=== Stage 3 ===
14 June 2024 — Turnhout to Scherpenheuvel-Zichem, 188.3 km (117.0 mi)

Stage 3 Result
Rank	Rider	Team	Time
1	Jasper Philipsen (BEL)	Alpecin–Deceuninck	4h 06' 20"
2	Olav Kooij (NED)	Visma–Lease a Bike	+ 0"
3	Gerben Thijssen (BEL)	Intermarché–Wanty	+ 0"
4	Tim Merlier (BEL)	Soudal–Quick-Step	+ 0"
5	John Degenkolb (GER)	Team dsm–firmenich PostNL	+ 0"
6	Lionel Taminiaux (BEL)	Lotto–Dstny	+ 0"
7	Luca Mozzato (ITA)	Arkéa–B&B Hotels	+ 0"
8	Timothy Dupont (BEL)	Tarteletto–Isorex	+ 0"
9	Jasper Stuyven (BEL)	Lidl–Trek	+ 0"
10	Nicklas Amdi Pedersen (DEN)	TDT–Unibet Cycling Team	+ 0"

General classification after Stage 3
Rank	Rider	Team	Time
1	Søren Wærenskjold (NOR)	Uno-X Mobility	8h 18' 54"
2	Mathias Vacek (CZE)	Lidl–Trek	+ 11"
3	Rune Herregodts (BEL)	Intermarché–Wanty	+ 22"
4	Alec Segaert (BEL)	Lotto–Dstny	+ 23"
5	Jasper Stuyven (BEL)	Lidl–Trek	+ 25"
6	Kasper Asgreen (DEN)	Soudal–Quick-Step	+ 26"
7	Alex Aranburu (ESP)	Movistar Team	+ 28"
8	Daan Hoole (NED)	Lidl–Trek	+ 30"
9	Jasper Philipsen (BEL)	Alpecin–Deceuninck	+ 33"
10	Damien Touzé (FRA)	Decathlon–AG2R La Mondiale	+ 34"

=== Stage 4 ===
15 June 2024 — Durbuy to Durbuy, 177 km (110 mi)

Stage 4 Result
Rank	Rider	Team	Time
1	Alex Aranburu (ESP)	Movistar Team	4h 14' 26"
2	Pierre Gautherat (FRA)	Decathlon–AG2R La Mondiale	+ 0"
3	Jasper Philipsen (BEL)	Alpecin–Deceuninck	+ 3"
4	Riley Sheehan (USA)	Israel–Premier Tech	+ 3"
5	Carlos Canal (ESP)	Movistar Team	+ 3"
6	Jasper Stuyven (BEL)	Lidl–Trek	+ 3"
7	Lorenzo Rota (ITA)	Intermarché–Wanty	+ 3"
8	Damien Touzé (FRA)	Decathlon–AG2R La Mondiale	+ 3"
9	Per Strand Hagenes (NOR)	Visma–Lease a Bike	+ 3"
10	Gonzalo Serrano (ESP)	Movistar Team	+ 6"

General classification after Stage 4
Rank	Rider	Team	Time
1	Søren Wærenskjold (NOR)	Uno-X Mobility	12h 33' 32"
2	Mathias Vacek (CZE)	Lidl–Trek	+ 2"
3	Alex Aranburu (ESP)	Movistar Team	+ 6"
4	Jasper Stuyven (BEL)	Lidl–Trek	+ 16"
5	Jasper Philipsen (BEL)	Alpecin–Deceuninck	+ 20"
6	Kasper Asgreen (DEN)	Soudal–Quick-Step	+ 21"
7	Damien Touzé (FRA)	Decathlon–AG2R La Mondiale	+ 25"
8	Per Strand Hagenes (NOR)	Visma–Lease a Bike	+ 25"
9	Alec Segaert (BEL)	Lotto–Dstny	+ 26"
10	Pier-André Côté (CAN)	Israel–Premier Tech	+ 35"

=== Stage 5 ===
16 June 2024 — Brussels to Brussels, 186.2 km (115.7 mi)

Stage 5 Result
Rank	Rider	Team	Time
1	Tim Merlier (BEL)	Soudal–Quick-Step	3h 51' 51"
2	Jasper Philipsen (BEL)	Alpecin–Deceuninck	+ 0"
3	Tom Van Asbroeck (BEL)	Israel–Premier Tech	+ 0"
4	Mathias Vacek (CZE)	Lidl–Trek	+ 0"
5	Sander De Pestel (BEL)	Decathlon–AG2R La Mondiale	+ 0"
6	Gerben Thijssen (BEL)	Intermarché–Wanty	+ 0"
7	Emilien Jeannière (FRA)	Team TotalEnergies	+ 0"
8	Oded Kogut (ISR)	Israel–Premier Tech	+ 0"
9	Lionel Taminiaux (BEL)	Lotto–Dstny	+ 0"
10	Matyáš Kopecký (CZE)	Team Novo Nordisk	+ 0"

General classification after Stage 5
Rank	Rider	Team	Time
1	Søren Wærenskjold (NOR)	Uno-X Mobility	16h 25' 20"
2	Mathias Vacek (CZE)	Lidl–Trek	+ 4"
3	Alex Aranburu (ESP)	Movistar Team	+ 7"
4	Jasper Philipsen (BEL)	Alpecin–Deceuninck	+ 17"
5	Jasper Stuyven (BEL)	Lidl–Trek	+ 19"
6	Kasper Asgreen (DEN)	Soudal–Quick-Step	+ 24"
7	Alec Segaert (BEL)	Lotto–Dstny	+ 26"
8	Damien Touzé (FRA)	Decathlon–AG2R La Mondiale	+ 28"
9	Per Strand Hagenes (NOR)	Visma–Lease a Bike	+ 28"
10	Pier-André Côté (CAN)	Israel–Premier Tech	+ 35"

== Classification leadership table ==
Classification leadership by stage
Stage	Winner	General classification (Dutch: Algemeen klassement)	Points classification (Dutch: Puntenklassement)	Combativity classification (Dutch: Strijdlustklassement)	Young rider classification (Dutch: Jongerenklassement)	Team classification (Dutch: Ploegenklassement)
1	Søren Wærenskjold	Søren Wærenskjold	Søren Wærenskjold	not awarded	Mathias Vacek	Lidl–Trek
2	Tim Merlier	Søren Wærenskjold	Søren Wærenskjold	Lars Craps	Mathias Vacek	Lidl–Trek
3	Jasper Philipsen	Søren Wærenskjold	Jasper Philipsen	Lindsay De Vylder	Mathias Vacek	Lidl–Trek
4	Alex Aranburu	Søren Wærenskjold	Jasper Philipsen	Jago Willems	Mathias Vacek	Movistar Team
5	Tim Merlier	Søren Wærenskjold	Jasper Philipsen	Jago Willems	Mathias Vacek	Movistar Team
Final		Søren Wærenskjold	Jasper Philipsen	Jago Willems	Mathias Vacek	Movistar Team

== Classification standings ==
Legend
Denotes the leader of the general classification	Denotes the leader of the combativity classification
Denotes the leader of the points classification	Denotes the leader of the young rider classification

=== General classification ===
Final general classification (1–10)
Rank	Rider	Team	Time
1	Søren Wærenskjold (NOR)	Uno-X Mobility	16h 25' 20"
2	Mathias Vacek (CZE)	Lidl–Trek	+ 4"
3	Alex Aranburu (ESP)	Movistar Team	+ 7"
4	Jasper Philipsen (BEL)	Alpecin–Deceuninck	+ 17"
5	Jasper Stuyven (BEL)	Lidl–Trek	+ 19"
6	Kasper Asgreen (DEN)	Soudal–Quick-Step	+ 24"
7	Alec Segaert (BEL)	Lotto–Dstny	+ 26"
8	Damien Touzé (FRA)	Decathlon–AG2R La Mondiale	+ 28"
9	Per Strand Hagenes (NOR)	Visma–Lease a Bike	+ 28"
10	Pier-André Côté (CAN)	Israel–Premier Tech	+ 35"

=== Points classification ===
Final points classification (1–10)
Rank	Rider	Team	Points
1	Jasper Philipsen (BEL)	Alpecin–Deceuninck	102
2	Tim Merlier (BEL)	Soudal–Quick-Step	79
3	Gerben Thijssen (BEL)	Intermarché–Wanty	48
4	Olav Kooij (NED)	Visma–Lease a Bike	47
5	Lionel Taminiaux (BEL)	Lotto–Dstny	43
6	Alex Aranburu (ESP)	Movistar Team	39
7	Mathias Vacek (CZE)	Lidl–Trek	37
8	Jasper Stuyven (BEL)	Lidl–Trek	34
9	Søren Wærenskjold (NOR)	Uno-X Mobility	33
10	Pierre Gautherat (FRA)	Decathlon–AG2R La Mondiale	25

=== Combativity classification ===
Final combativity classification (1–10)
Rank	Rider	Team	Points
1	Jago Willems (BEL)	VolkerWessels Women's Pro Cycling Team	69
2	Lindsay De Vylder (BEL)	Team Flanders–Baloise	68
3	Lars Craps (BEL)	Team Flanders–Baloise	32
4	Stijn Appel (NED)	BEAT Cycling Club	23
5	Dries De Bondt (BEL)	Decathlon–AG2R La Mondiale	20
6	Martin Svrček (SVK)	Soudal–Quick-Step	19
7	Olivier Godfroid (BEL)	Baloise–Trek Lions	17
8	Rémi Cavagna (FRA)	Movistar Team	15
9	Diego Pablo Sevilla (ESP)	Polti–Kometa	12
10	Tristan Scherpenbergh (BEL)	Philippe Wagner–Bazin	11

=== Young rider classification ===
Final young rider classification (1–10)
Rank	Rider	Team	Time
1	Mathias Vacek (CZE)	Lidl–Trek	16h 25' 24"
2	Alec Segaert (BEL)	Lotto–Dstny	+ 22"
3	Per Strand Hagenes (NOR)	Visma–Lease a Bike	+ 24"
4	Pierre Gautherat (FRA)	Decathlon–AG2R La Mondiale	+ 39"
5	Iván Romeo (ESP)	Movistar Team	+ 43"
6	Joseph Blackmore (GBR)	Israel–Premier Tech	+ 1' 08"
7	Pepijn Reinderink (NED)	Soudal–Quick-Step	+ 3' 40"
8	Davide De Cassan (ITA)	Polti–Kometa	+ 7' 01"
9	Martin Svrček (SVK)	Soudal–Quick-Step	+ 7' 32"
10	Matyáš Kopecký (CZE)	Team Novo Nordisk	+ 8' 44"

=== Team classification ===
Final team classification (1–10)
Rank	Team	Time
1	(Spain) Movistar Team	49h 17' 22"
2	(United States) Lidl–Trek	+ 3"
3	(Belgium) Lotto–Dstny	+ 19"
4	(France) Decathlon–AG2R La Mondiale	+ 52"
5	Israel–Premier Tech	+ 1' 16"
6	(France) Team TotalEnergies	+ 1' 50"
7	(Belgium) Alpecin–Deceuninck	+ 3' 03"
8	(Italy) Polti–Kometa	+ 5' 44"
9	(Belgium) Soudal–Quick-Step	+ 7' 17"
10	(Belgium) Team Flanders–Baloise	+ 7' 48"
