= Søren Wærenskjold =

Norwegian cyclist

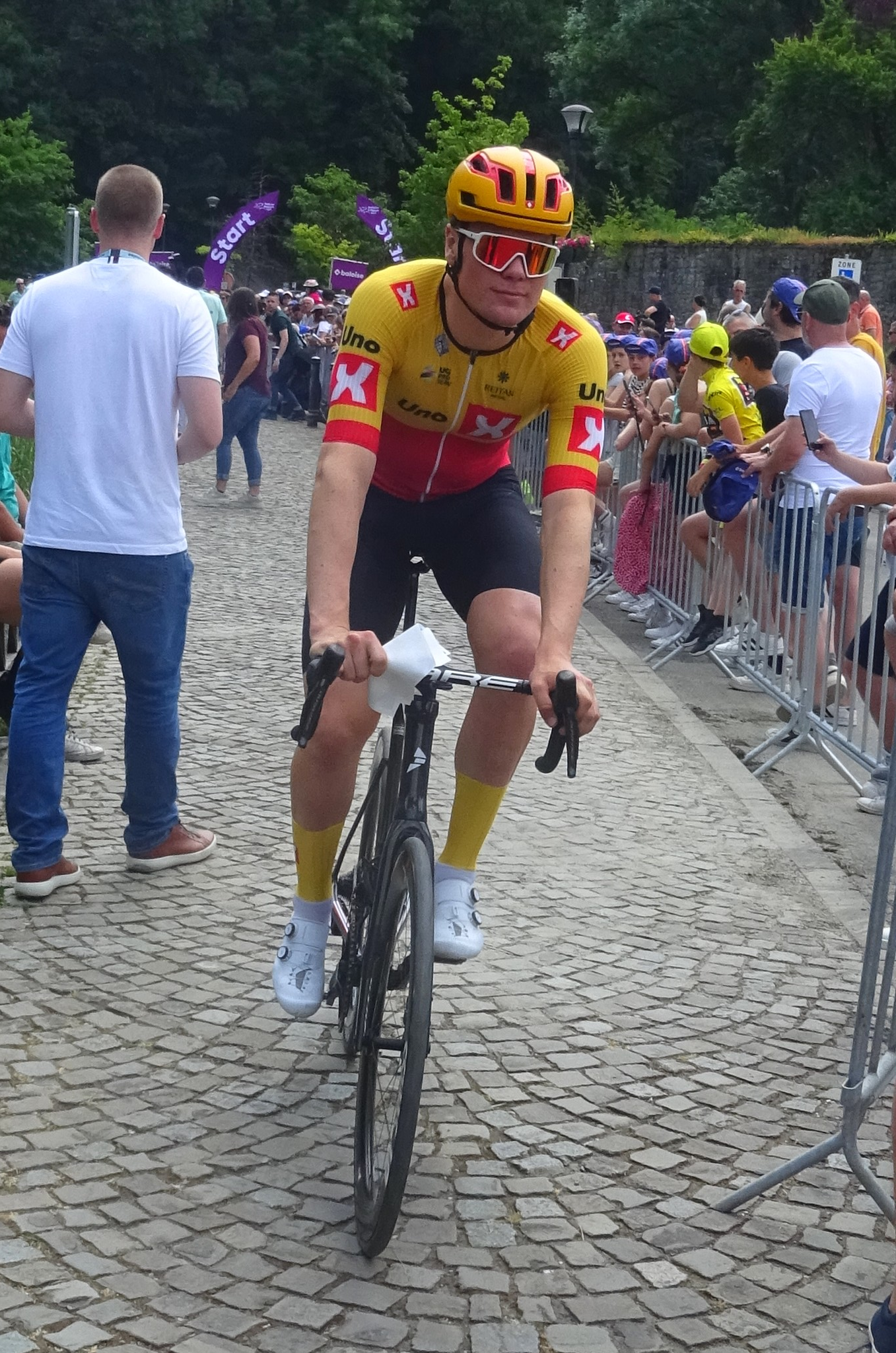
- Wærenskjold at the 2023 Tour of Belgium

Personal information
- Full name: Søren Wærenskjold
- Nickname: Flodhesten fra Mandal (The Hippo from Mandal)
- Born: 12 March 2000 (age 26) Mandal, Norway
- Height: 1.95 m (6 ft 5 in)
- Weight: 92 kg (203 lb)

Cycling career
- Sport: Cycling
- Current team: Uno-X Mobility
- Discipline: Road
- Role: Rider
- Rider type: Time Trialist; Sprinting

Professional teams
- 2019–2020: Joker Fuel of Norway
- 2021–: Uno-X Pro Cycling Team

Major wins
- Grand Tours Tour de France 1 individual stage (2026) Stage races Tour of Belgium (2024) Deutschland Tour (2025) One-day races and Classics National Time Trial Championships (2023, 2024) Omloop Het Nieuwsblad (2025)
Medal record
Men's road bicycle racing
Representing Norway
World Championships
Gold medal – first place	2022 Wollongong	Under-23 time trial
Bronze medal – third place	2022 Wollongong	Under-23 road race
European Championships
Gold medal – first place	2021 Trentino	Under-23 time trial

Søren Wærenskjold (born 12 March 2000) is a Norwegian cyclist, who rides for UCI ProTeam Uno-X Mobility. Wærenskjold is a two-time national time trial champion, as well as an under-23 world champion in 2022 and under-23 European champion in 2021. He also won the Tour of Belgium stage race in 2024.

Wærenskjold won stage eleven of the 2026 Tour de France. He launched an early sprint with around 400 meters to go, surprising the peloton. He said of his victory, "It means everything [..] it's my biggest win so far." The stage was the fastest on record, with an average speed of 50.9 kilometers per hour (31.6 miles per hour).

== Major results ==
=== Road ===
2017
1st Overall Internationale Niedersachsen-Rundfahrt

1st Points classification
1st Young rider classification

National Junior Championships

2nd Time trial
3rd Road race

4th Overall Grand Prix Rüebliland

1st Stage 4

10th Overall Trofeo Karlsberg

1st Young rider classification

10th Overall Trophée Centre Morbihan
2018
1st Time trial, National Junior Championships
1st Overall Saarland Trofeo

1st Stage 3a

2nd Gent–Wevelgem Juniors
3rd Overall Trophée Centre Morbihan

1st Stage 2a (ITT)

5th Time trial, UCI World Junior Championships
2019
5th Youngster Coast Challenge
6th Ringerike GP
2020
1st Overall International Tour of Rhodes

1st Young rider classification
1st Stages 1 & 3

3rd Time trial, National Championships
2021
Tour de l'Avenir

1st Prologue & Stage 1

1st Prologue Grand Prix Priessnitz spa
2nd Time trial, UEC European Under-23 Championships
2nd Time trial, National Championships
4th Time trial, UCI World Under-23 Championships
5th Circuit de Wallonie
2022
UCI World Under-23 Championships

1st Time trial
3rd Road race

1st Road race, National Under-23 Championships
1st Stage 1 Tour de l'Avenir
2nd Time trial, National Championships
2nd Chrono des Nations Under-23
7th Bredene Koksijde Classic
8th Kattekoers
2023 (6 pro wins)
1st Time trial, National Championships
1st Overall Tour Poitou-Charentes en Nouvelle-Aquitaine

1st Young rider classification
1st Stage 1

1st Stage 3 Saudi Tour
2nd Overall Tour of Belgium

1st Stage 3 (ITT)

4th Overall Danmark Rundt

1st Stage 1

7th Dwars door het Hageland
7th Münsterland Giro
2024 (6)
1st Time trial, National Championships
1st Overall Tour of Belgium

1st Stage 1 (ITT)

1st Overall Tour Poitou-Charentes en Nouvelle-Aquitaine

1st Young rider classification
1st Stage 3 (ITT)

1st Stage 2 AlUla Tour
3rd Grand Prix de Fourmies
5th Dwars door het Hageland
6th Scheldeprijs
9th Time trial, UEC European Championships
9th Paris–Roubaix
2025 (6)
1st Overall Deutschland Tour

1st Points classification
1st Young rider classification
1st Prologue & Stage 3

1st Omloop Het Nieuwsblad
1st Stage 2 Danmark Rundt
1st Stage 2 Étoile de Bessèges
3rd Time trial, National Championships
5th Chrono des Nations
6th Grand Prix de Fourmies
7th Trofeo Palma
7th Gooikse Pijl
10th Copenhagen Sprint
10th Kampioenschap van Vlaanderen
2026 (1)
1st Stage 11 Tour de France
2nd Heistse Pijl
3rd Dwars door Vlaanderen
3rd Kampioenschap van Vlaanderen
7th Overall Renewi Tour
8th Hamburg Cyclassics
8th Gooikse Pijl
9th Münsterland Giro

==== Grand Tour general classification results timeline ====
Grand Tour	2023	2024	2025	2026
Giro d'Italia	—	—	—	—
Tour de France	140	133	DNF	138
Vuelta a España	—	—		

==== Classics results timeline ====
Monument	2021	2022	2023	2024	2025	2026
Milan–San Remo	—	—	—	133	—	62
Tour of Flanders	—	DNF	—	DNF	—	DNF
Paris–Roubaix	—	DNF	22	9	42	DNF
Liège–Bastogne–Liège	—	—	—	—	—	—
Giro di Lombardia	—	—	—	—	—	—
Classic	2021	2022	2023	2024	2025	2026
Omloop Het Nieuwsblad	—	—	—	DNF	1	65
Kuurne–Brussels–Kuurne	DNF	—	DNF	105	DNF	—
Gent–Wevelgem	—	—	25	—	DNF	45
Dwars door Vlaanderen	—	—	14	—	DNF	3
Scheldeprijs	21	DNF	55	6	—	—
Copenhagen Sprint	Race did not exist				10	14
Hamburg Cyclassics	—	—	—	—	—	8

Legend
—	Did not compete
DNF	Did not finish
IP	Race in Progress

=== Cyclo-cross ===
2018–2019
3rd National Championships
2019–2020
1st National Championships
