= Enzo Leijnse =

Dutch cyclist

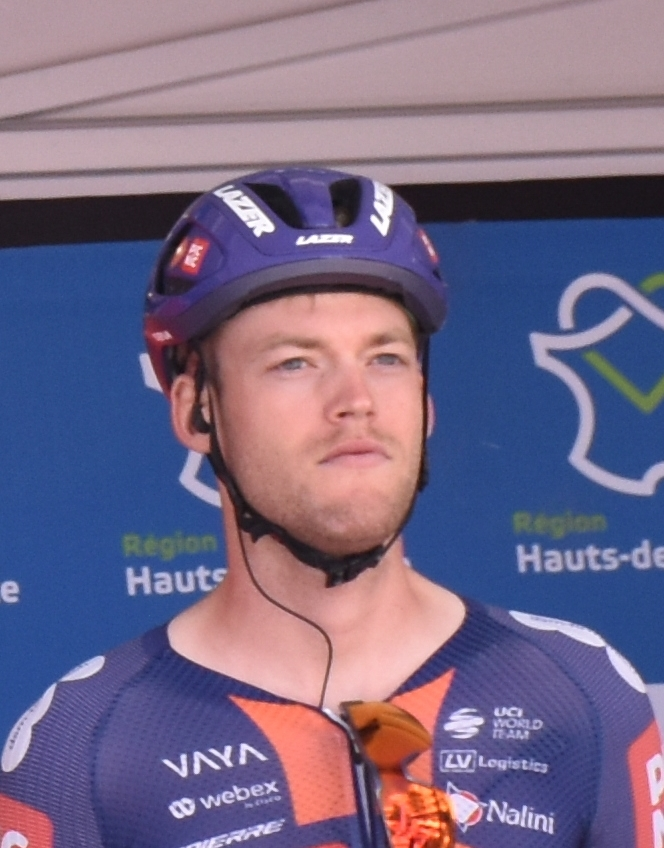
- Leijnse in 2025

Personal information
- Born: 16 July 2001 (age 25) Amsterdam, Netherlands
- Height: 1.94 m (6 ft 4 in)

Cycling career
- Sport: Cycling
- Current team: Team Picnic–PostNL
- Discipline: Road
- Role: Rider

Professional teams
- 2020–2023: Development Team Sunweb
- 2024–: Team dsm–firmenich PostNL

Enzo Leijnse (born 16 July 2001 in Amsterdam) is a Dutch cyclist, who currently rides for UCI WorldTeam Team Picnic–PostNL.

== Major results ==
2018
1st Overall Grand Prix Rüebliland

1st Stage 3 (ITT)

3rd Time trial, National Junior Road Championships
6th Grand Prix Bob Jungels
6th Overall Saarland Trofeo
2019
UCI Junior Road World Championships

2nd Time trial
4th Road race

2nd Time trial, National Junior Road Championships
UEC European Junior Road Championships

3rd Time trial
4th Road race

4th Overall Grand Prix Rüebliland
6th Overall Tour du Pays de Vaud
7th EPZ Omloop van Borsele
10th La Philippe Gilbert juniors
2020
1st Stage 2b (TTT) Ronde de l'Isard
7th Time trial, UEC European Under-23 Road Championships
2021
1st Stage 2 (TTT) Tour de l'Avenir
5th Time trial, National Under-23 Road Championships
2022
1st Prologue (TTT) Tour de l'Avenir
3rd Time trial, National Under-23 Road Championships
2023
1st Time trial, National Under-23 Road Championships
1st Stage 4 Olympia's Tour
2025
1st Mountains classification, Deutschland Tour
2026
5th Time trial, National Road Championships
