= Uno-X Mobility (men's team) =

Norwegian cycling team

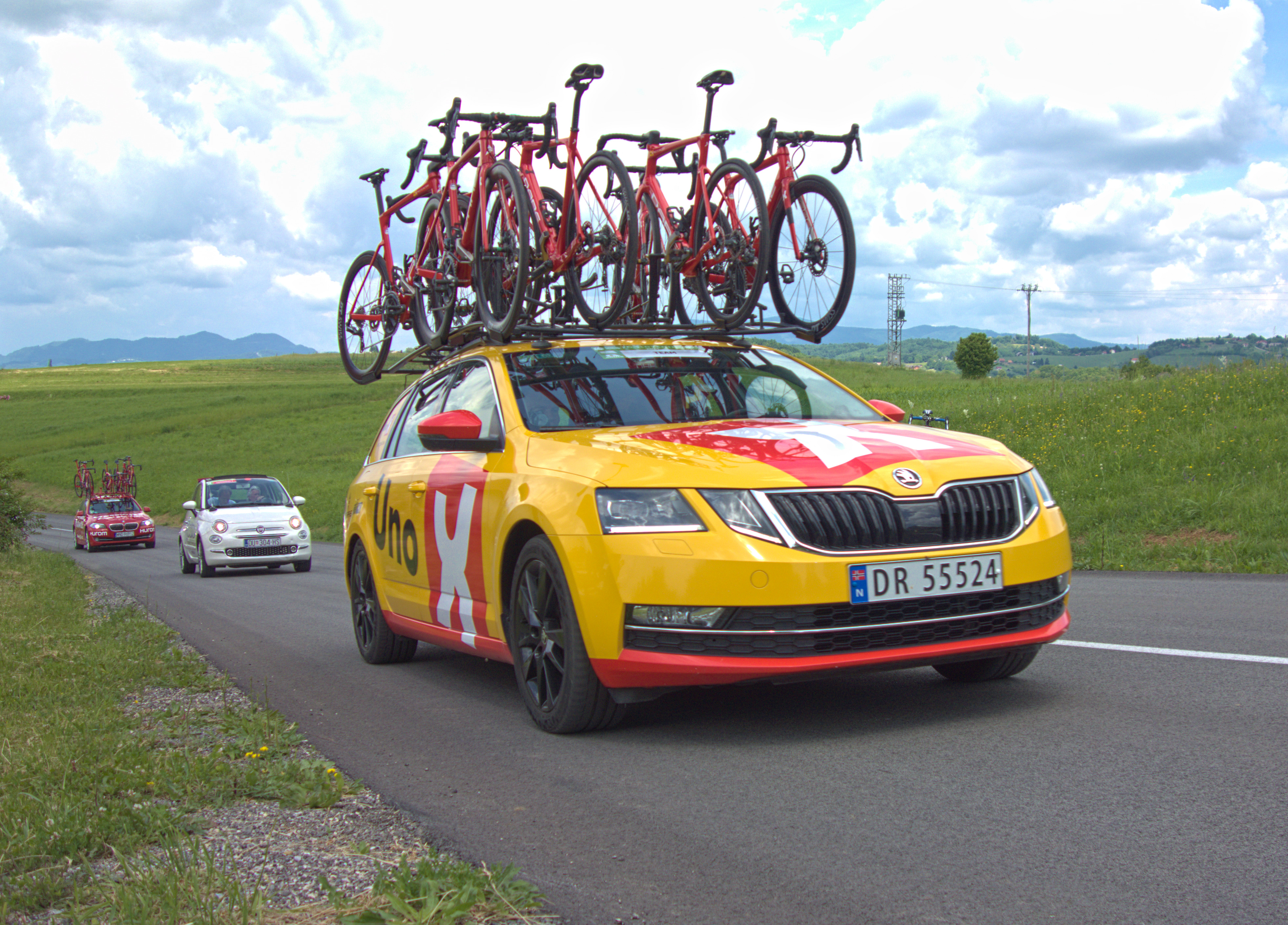

Team information
- UCI code: UXM
- Registered: Norway
- Founded: 2010
- Discipline: Road
- Status: UCI Continental (2010–19); UCI ProTeam (2020–2025); UCI WorldTeam (2026–)
- Bicycles: DARE (2021–2024) Ridley (2025–)

Key personnel
- General manager: Thor Hushovd
- Team manager: Gabriel Rasch

Team name history
- 2010–2011 2012–2013 2014–2016 2017 2018–2020 2020–2023 2024–: Team Ringeriks–Kraft; Team Ringeriks–Kraft Look; Team Ringeriks–Kraft; Uno-X Hydrogen Development Team; Uno-X Norwegian Development Team; Uno-X Pro Cycling Team; Uno-X Mobility

Uno-X Mobility is a Norwegian UCI WorldTeam established in 2016, as a continuation of the earlier Team Ringeriks-Kraft. Uno-X Mobility was initially established as a cooperation between Uno-X, Ringerike Sykkelklubb and Lillehammer Cykleklubb, and had its inaugural season in 2017. The team is sponsored by fuel station chain Uno-X, which is part of the Reitan conglomerate.

The team held UCI Continental status until 2020, when it upgraded to a ProTeam. In September 2018, the team launched a development program, the Uno-X Mobility Development Team, which became a UCI Continental team in 2021. The team was granted a wildcard spot to compete in the 2023 Tour de France and adopted custom jerseys sponsored by REMA 1000 for the race. Uno-X was again invited to the Tour de France in 2024.

Uno-X pursued the goal of becoming the first Scandinavian team to hold a UCI WorldTeam license for both women and men. Having achieved WorldTeam-status for their women's team in 2022, the men's team sought to gather enough points for a promotion in 2026. The team succeeded in doing this, and is currently a UCI WorldTeam for the 2026-2029 cycle.

In January 2024, former cyclist and world champion Thor Hushovd replaced Jens Haugland as General Manager for the team.

== Team roster ==
As of 11 March 2026.

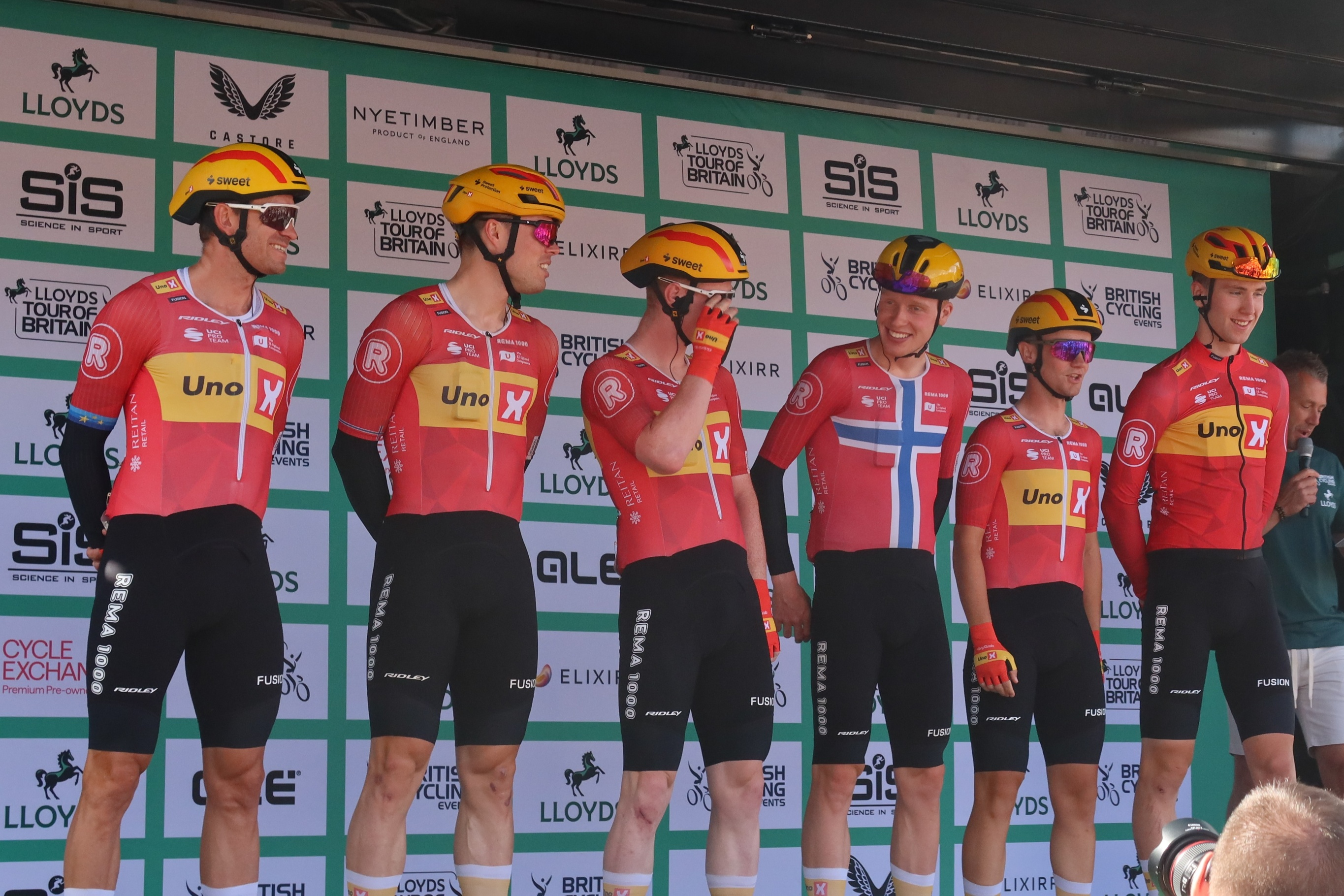
The team at the 2025 Tour of Britain

Rider	Date of birth
Jonas Abrahamsen (NOR)	20 September 1995 (age 31)
Carl-Frederik Bévort (DEN)	24 November 2003 (age 22)
Erlend Blikra (NOR)	11 January 1997 (age 29)
William Blume Levy (DEN)	14 January 2001 (age 25)
Martin Urianstad Bugge (NOR)	6 February 1999 (age 27)
Magnus Cort (DEN)	16 January 1993 (age 33)
Simon Dalby (DEN)	29 January 2003 (age 23)
Fredrik Dversnes (NOR)	20 March 1997 (age 29)
Stian Fredheim (NOR)	23 March 2003 (age 23)
Markus Hoelgaard (NOR)	4 October 1994 (age 31)
Ådne Holter (NOR)	8 July 2000 (age 26)
Jonas Iversby Hvideberg (NOR)	9 February 1999 (age 27)
Storm Ingebrigtsen (NOR)	17 February 2005 (age 21)
Anders Halland Johannessen (NOR)	23 August 1999 (age 27)
Tobias Halland Johannessen (NOR)	23 August 1999 (age 27)

Rider	Date of birth
Anthon Charmig (DEN)	25 March 1998 (age 28)
Andreas Kron (DEN)	1 June 1998 (age 28)
Johannes Kulset (NOR)	14 April 2004 (age 22)
Alexander Kamp (DEN)	14 December 1993 (age 32)
Andreas Leknessund (NOR)	21 May 1999 (age 27)
Sakarias Koller Løland (NOR)	20 September 2001 (age 25)
Henrik Pedersen (DEN)	3 December 2004 (age 21)
Erik Resell (NOR)	28 September 1996 (age 30)
Anders Skaarseth (NOR)	7 May 1995 (age 31)
Rasmus Tiller (NOR)	28 July 1996 (age 30)
Martin Tjøtta (NOR)	27 January 2001 (age 25)
Søren Wærenskjold (NOR)	12 March 2000 (age 26)
Sven Erik Bystrøm (NOR)	21 January 1992 (age 34)
Tobias Svarre (DEN)	19 July 2004 (age 22)
Torstein Træen (NOR)	16 July 1995 (age 31)

== Major wins ==
2014 (1)
Sweden National Road Race Championships, Michael Olsson
2016 (1)
Scandinavian Race Uppsala, Syver Wærsted
2017 (1)
Fyen Rundt, Audun Fløtten
2018 (3)
Stage 3 International Tour of Rhodes, Syver Waersted
Ringerike GP, Syver Waersted
Omloop Het Nieuwsblad Beloften, Erik Resell
2019 (5)
Ringerike GP, Kristoffer Skjerping,
Stage 3 Oberösterreichrundfahrt, Anders Skaarseth
Norway National Time Trial Championships, Andreas Leknessund
Stage 4 Arctic Race of Norway, Markus Hoelgaard
Gylne Gutuer, Kristoffer Skjerping
2020 (15)
International Rhodes Grand Prix, Erlend Blikra
Stage 2 International Tour of Rhodes, Erlend Blikra
Denmark National Hill Climb Championships, Morten Alexander Hulgaard
Norway National Time Trial Championships, Andreas Leknessund
Hafjell GP, Andreas Leknessund
Stage 2 Bałtyk–Karkonosze Tour, Frederik Rodenberg
Lillehammer GP, Andreas Leknessund
Denmark National U23 Time Trial Championships, Julius Johansen
Norway National U23 Road Race Championships, Martin Urianstad
Denmark National U23 Road Race Championships, Julius Johansen
Stage 2 Tour of Małopolska, Jonas Abrahamsen
Stage 3 Tour of Małopolska, Torstein Træen
Overall Giro della Friuli Venezia Giulia

Stage 1 (TTT)
Stage 3, Andreas Leknessund

2021 (13)
Overall Tour de la Mirabelle, Idar Andersen

Prologue, Idar Andersen
Stage 3, Erlend Blikra

Fyen Rundt, Niklas Larsen
Dwars door het Hageland, Rasmus Tiller
Stage 1 Arctic Race of Norway, Markus Hoelgaard
Stages 3 & 4 Czech Cycling Tour, Tobias Halland Johannessen
Stage 3 Okolo Slovenska, Kristoffer Halvorsen
UCI World U23 Time Trial Championships, Johan Price-Pejtersen
Lillehammer GP, Idar Andersen
Paris–Tours Espoirs, Jonas Iversby Hvideberg
Denmark National U23 Time Trial Championships, Johan Price-Pejtersen
2022 (10)
Grand Prix Megasaray, Tord Gudmestad
Stage 4 Étoile de Bessèges, Tobias Halland Johannessen
Stage 3 Tour of Oman, Anthon Charmig
Overall Tour of Antalya, Jacob Hindsgaul Madsen

Stage 3, Jacob Hindsgaul Madsen

Boucles de l'Aulne, Idar Andersen
Norway National U23 Road Race Championships, Søren Wærenskjold
Norway National Road Race Championships, Rasmus Tiller
UCI World U23 Time Trial Championships, Søren Wærenskjold
Stage 6 Tour de Langkawi, Erlend Blikra
2023 (15)
Stage 3 Saudi Tour, Søren Wærenskjold
Stage 1 Volta ao Algarve, Alexander Kristoff
Route Adélie, Fredrik Dversnes
Stage 2 Région Pays de la Loire Tour, Erlend Blikra
Stage 4 Région Pays de la Loire Tour, Fredrik Dversnes
Stage 3 Tour of Norway, Alexander Kristoff
Dwars door het Hageland, Rasmus Tiller
Stage 3 (ITT) Tour of Belgium, Søren Wærenskjold
Norway National Time Trial Championships, Søren Wærenskjold
Norway National Road Race Championships, Fredrik Dversnes
Stage 1 Danmark Rundt, Søren Wærenskjold
Overall Tour Poitou-Charentes en Nouvelle Aquitaine, Søren Wærenskjold

Stage 1, Søren Wærenskjold

Stage 7 Tour of Britain, Rasmus Tiller
Stage 5 Tour de Luxembourg, Tobias Halland Johannessen
2024 (26)
Stage 2 AlUla Tour, Søren Wærenskjold
Elfstedenronde, Alexander Kristoff
Veenendaal–Veenendaal Classic, Tord Gudmestad
Antwerp Port Epic, Alexander Kristoff
Stage 4 Tour of Norway, Alexander Kristoff
Heistse Pijl, Alexander Kristoff
Brussels Cycling Classic, Jonas Abrahamsen
Stage 2 Critérium du Dauphiné, Magnus Cort
Overall Tour of Belgium, Søren Wærenskjold

Stage 1 (ITT), Søren Wærenskjold

Norway National Time Trial Championships, Søren Wærenskjold
Norway National Road Race Championships, Markus Hoelgaard
Stage 1 Sibiu Cycling Tour, Andreas Leknessund
Stage 3 Tour de Wallonie, Markus Hoelgaard
Overall Arctic Race of Norway, Magnus Cort

Stages 1 & 2, Alexander Kristoff
Stage 4, Magnus Cort

Stage 2 Danmark Rundt, Magnus Cort
Tour of Leuven, Markus Hoelgaard
Overall Tour Poitou-Charentes en Nouvelle-Aquitaine, Søren Wærenskjold

Stage 1, Fredrik Dversnes
Stage 3 (ITT), Søren Wærenskjold

Stages 1 & 5 CRO Race, Alexander Kristoff
Veneto Classic, Magnus Cort
2025 (21)
Stage 2 Étoile de Bessèges, Søren Wærenskjold
Stage 3 Vuelta a Andalucía, Alexander Kristoff
Stages 1, 2 & 5 O Gran Camiño, Magnus Cort
Omloop Het Nieuwsblad, Søren Wærenskjold
Stage 5 Tirreno–Adriatico, Fredrik Dversnes
Roue Tourangelle, Erlend Blikra
Route Adélie de Vitré, Stian Fredheim
Norway National Road Race Championships, Andreas Leknessund
Overall Tour of Slovenia, Anders Halland Johannessen
Stage 11 Tour de France, Jonas Abrahamsen
Stage 2 2025 Arctic Race of Norway, Alexander Kristoff
Stage 4 2025 Arctic Race of Norway, Fredrik Dversnes
Stage 2 2025 Danmark Rundt, Søren Wærenskjold
Stage 1 2025 Deutschland Tour, Søren Wærenskjold
Stage 3 2025 Deutschland Tour, Søren Wærenskjold
Overall 2025 Deutschland Tour, Søren Wærenskjold
Muur Classic Geraardsbergen, Jonas Abrahamsen
Circuit Franco-Belge, Jonas Abrahamsen
Veneto Classic, Sakarias Koller Løland
2026 (16)
Stage 4 Tour of Oman, Erlend Blikra
Stage 2 Volta a Catalunya, Magnus Cort
Stage 3 Région Pays de la Loire Tour, Alexander Kamp
Stage 3 Four Days of Dunkirk, Rasmus Tiller
Stage 15 Giro d'Italia, Fredrik Dversnes
Stage 2 Tour Auvergne-Rhône-Alpes, Anthon Charmig
Stage 11 Tour de France, Søren Wærenskjold
Stage 4 Danmark Rundt, Storm Ingebrigtsen
Stage 2 Arctic Race of Norway, Erlend Blikra
Stage 7 Vuelta a España, Andreas Leknessund
Stage 21 Vuelta a España, Tobias Halland Johannessen
Trofeo Matteotti, Sakarias Koller Løland
Flandrien 0.0 Classic, Henrik Pedersen
CRO Race, Tobias Svarre

Stage 2 Carl-Frederik Bévort
Stage 3 Tobias Svarre

== Supplementary statistics ==
Grand Tours by highest finishing position
Race	2020	2021	2022	2023	2024	2025
Giro d'Italia	—	—	—	—	—	—
Tour de France	—	—	—	30	34	6
Vuelta a España	—	—	—	—	—	—
Major week-long stage races by highest finishing position
Race	2020	2021	2022	2023	2024	2025
Tour Down Under	—	NH		—	—	—
UAE Tour	—	—	—	—	—	—
Paris–Nice	—	—	—	46	—	29
Tirreno–Adriatico	—	—	—	—	35	11
Volta a Catalunya	NH	—	7	57	21	—
Tour of the Basque Country	NH	—	—	—	—	—
Tour de Romandie	NH	—	—	—	—	—
Critérium du Dauphiné	—	—	10	8	51	5
Tour de Suisse	NH	—	—	—	—	—
Tour de Pologne	—	—	27	—		
Benelux Tour	—	—	NH	—		
Monument races by highest finishing position
Monument	2020	2021	2022	2023	2024	2025
Milan–San Remo	—	—	—	—	33	6
Tour of Flanders	—	—	28	18	24	14
Paris–Roubaix	NH	—	27	15	9	8
Liège–Bastogne–Liège	—	—	28	24	25	17
Il Lombardia	—	—	—	—	37	50
Classics by highest finishing position
Classic	2020	2021	2022	2023	2024	2025
Omloop Het Nieuwsblad	—	—	6	4	14	1
Kuurne–Brussels–Kuurne	31	10	28	21	70	19
Strade Bianche	—	—	—	—	27	6
E3 Saxo Bank Classic	NH	8	11	44	12	34
Gent–Wevelgem	—	—	29	15	20	5
Dwars door Vlaanderen	NH	–	79	14	2	11
Amstel Gold Race	NH	19	—	56	25	28
La Flèche Wallonne	—	—	20	15	6	27
Eschborn–Frankfurt	NH	11	54	12	10	2
Clásica de San Sebastián	NH	—	—	—		
Paris–Tours	27	46	13	3		

Legend
—	Did not compete
DNF	Did not finish
IP	Race in Progress
NH	Not held

== World and national championships ==
2014
Sweden Road Race, Michael Olsson
2019
Norway Time Trial, Andreas Leknessund
2020
World Track (Team Pursuit), Julius Johansen
Denmark Hill Climb, Morten Alexander Hulgaard
Norway Time Trial, Andreas Leknessund
Denmark U23 Time Trial, Julius Johansen
Norway U23 Road Race, Martin Urianstad
Denmark U23 Road Race, Julius Johansen
2021
World U23 Time Trial, Johan Price-Pejtersen
Denmark U23 Time Trial, Johan Price-Pejtersen

European Championships U23 Time Trial, Johan Price-Pejtersen

2022
World U23 Time Trial, Søren Wærenskjold
Norway Road Race, Rasmus Tiller
Norway U23 Road Race, Søren Wærenskjold
2023
Norway Road Race, Fredrik Dversnes Lavik
Norway Time Trial, Søren Wærenskjold
2024
Norway Road Race, Markus Hoelgaard
Norway Time Trial, Søren Wærenskjold
2025
Norway Road Race, Andreas Leknessund
2026
Norway Road Race, Anders Skaarseth
Denmark Road Race, Magnus Cort
