= Samuel Watson (cyclist) =

British cyclist

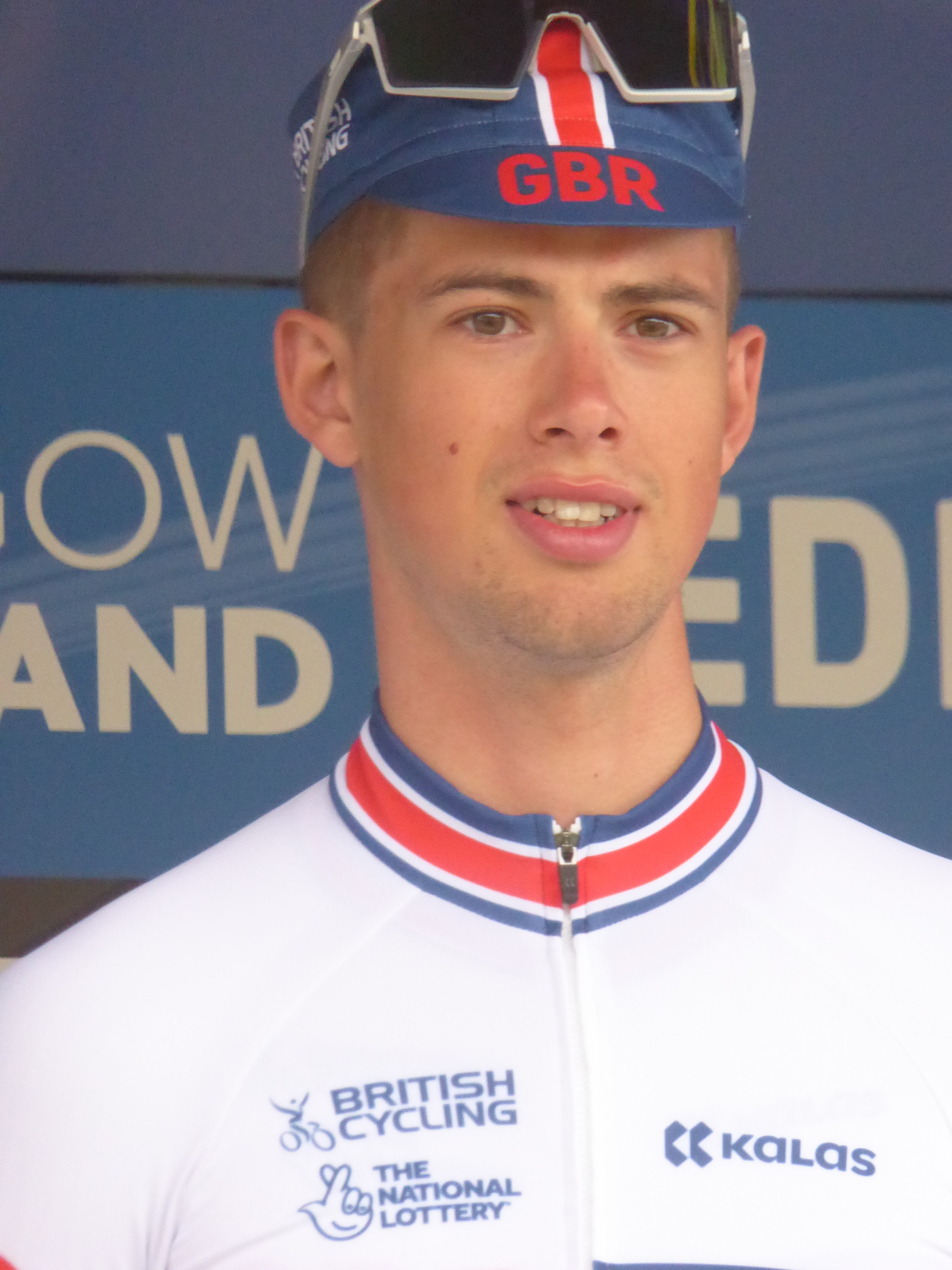
- Watson in 2023

Personal information
- Born: 24 September 2001 (age 25) Roundhay, Leeds, England
- Height: 1.88 m (6 ft 2 in)
- Weight: 68 kg (150 lb)

Cycling career
- Sport: Cycling
- Current team: Netcompany–Ineos
- Discipline: Road
- Role: Rider
- Rider type: Time trialist / sprinter

Professional teams
- 2021: Trinity Racing
- 2022: Équipe Continentale Groupama–FDJ
- 2023–2024: Groupama–FDJ
- 2025–: INEOS Grenadiers

Major wins
- Stage races Four Days of Dunkirk (2025) One-day races and Classics National Road Race Championships (2025)

Samuel Watson (born 24 September 2001) is a British cyclist, who currently rides for UCI WorldTeam Netcompany–Ineos.

== Personal life ==
Sam attended Roundhay School alongside Tom Pidcock and Joe Pidcock.

== Major results ==
=== Road ===
2018
1st Stage 4 Junior Tour of Wales
3rd Road race, National Junior Championships
8th Paris–Roubaix Juniors
2019
1st Guido Reybrouck Classic
1st Rutland–Melton International CiCLE Classic Juniors
1st Stage 3 Junior Tour of Wales
2nd Overall Trophée Centre Morbihan

1st Points classification

3rd Overall Keizer der Juniores
3rd Gent–Wevelgem Junioren
6th Overall Saarland Trofeo
2021
1st Stage 3 Kreiz Breizh Elites
5th Time trial, National Under-23 Championships
7th Overall L'Etoile d'Or
7th Gran Premio della Liberazione
2022
1st Road race, National Under-23 Championships
1st Gent–Wevelgem Under-23
1st Ilkley, National Circuit Series
Grand Prix Jeseníky

1st Points classification
1st Stage 3

1st Stage 5 Tour Alsace
National Championships

2nd Road race
2nd Circuit race

5th Tro-Bro Léon
2023
1st Road race, National Under-23 Championships
5th Road race, National Championships
6th Grand Prix de Denain
7th Boucles de l'Aulne
10th Overall Four Days of Dunkirk
10th Tro-Bro Léon
2024 (1 pro win)
1st Stage 5 Tour de Wallonie
4th Time trial, National Championships
4th Overall Boucles de la Mayenne

1st Young rider classification

10th Overall Tour de la Provence
2025 (4)
National Championships

1st Road race
2nd Time trial

1st Overall Four Days of Dunkirk

1st Young rider classification
1st Stage 4

1st Prologue Tour de Romandie
4th Figueira Champions Classic
5th Overall Deutschland Tour
5th Omloop Het Nieuwsblad
2026 (2)
1st Prologue Tour Down Under
1st Stage 5 Tour of Austria
1st Stage 3 (TTT) Paris–Nice

==== Grand Tour general classification results timeline ====
Grand Tour	2023	2024	2025
Giro d'Italia	—	—	—
Tour de France	—	—	115
Vuelta a España	123	—	—

Legend
—	Did not compete
DNF	Did not finish

=== Track ===
2018
3rd Madison, National Junior Championships (with Oliver Rees)
2019
1st Team pursuit, UEC European Junior Championships
3rd Madison, National Junior Championships (with Max Rushby)
2020
2nd Team pursuit, National Championships
2022
2nd Madison, UEC European Under-23 Championships (with William Tidball)
