= Per Strand Hagenes =

Norwegian road cyclist

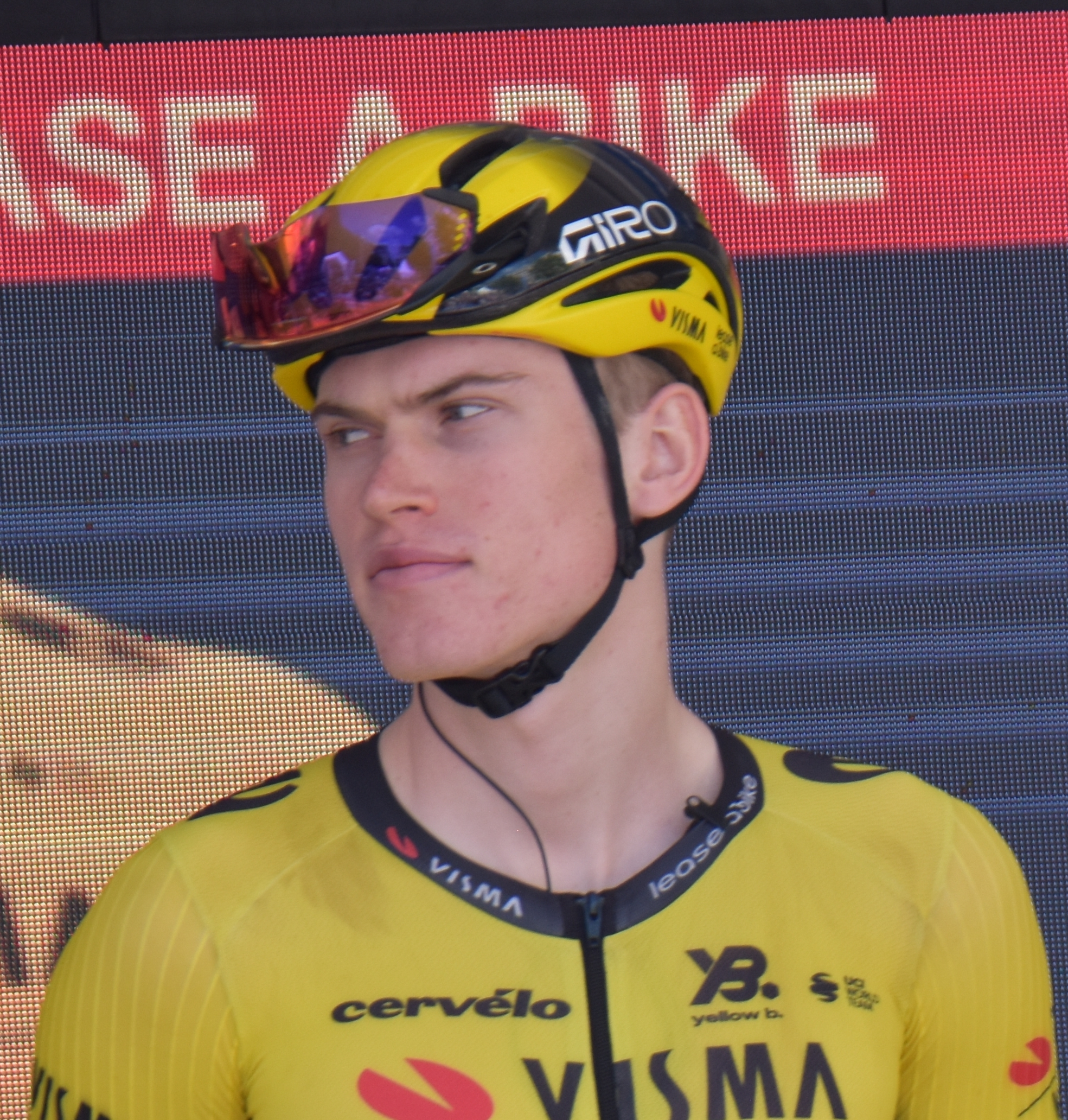
- Hagenes in 2025

Personal information
- Born: 10 July 2003 (age 23) Sandnes, Norway
- Height: 1.85 m (6 ft 1 in)

Cycling career
- Sport: Cycling
- Current team: Visma–Lease a Bike
- Discipline: Road
- Role: Rider

Amateur team
- 2021: Sandnes SK Junior

Professional teams
- 2022–2023: Jumbo–Visma Development Team
- 2024–: Visma–Lease a Bike

Major wins
- Grand Tours Tour de France 1 TTT stage (2026) One-day races and Classics Paris–Tours (2026) Münsterland Giro (2023)
Medal record
Road cycling
Representing Norway
UCI World Junior Championships
Gold medal – first place	2021 Flanders	Road race
European Junior Championships
Silver medal – second place	2021 Trentino	Road race

Per Strand Hagenes (born 10 July 2003) is a Norwegian road cyclist, who has also competed in cross-country skiing. He currently rides for UCI WorldTeam Visma–Lease a Bike. In 2021 he won a silver medal at road race of the European Junior Championships, and became World Junior Champion, winning the gold medal of the road race in Leuven, Belgium. He had already been the national junior champion in the road race twice, in 2020 and 2021, and the time trial champion in 2020.

== Major results ==
2020
National Junior Road Championships

1st Road race
1st Time trial

2021
1st Road race, UCI Junior Road World Championships
National Junior Road Championships

1st Road race
2nd Time trial

1st Overall Course de la Paix Juniors

1st Stage 3

1st Overall One Belt One Road

1st Prologue & Stage 2

UEC European Junior Road Championships

2nd Road race
6th Time trial

2nd Overall Aubel–Thimister–Stavelot

1st Stage 2b

3rd Paris–Roubaix Juniors
2022
1st Paris–Tours Espoirs
1st Stage 2 Oberösterreich Rundfahrt
2nd Overall Le Triptyque des Monts et Chateaux

1st Points classification
1st Young rider classification
1st Stage 3b

3rd Giro del Belvedere
2023 (3 pro wins)
1st Münsterland Giro
1st Ronde van Drenthe
1st Stage 1 (ITT) Olympia's Tour
9th Overall Four Days of Dunkirk

1st Stage 5

2024
3rd Overall Renewi Tour
5th Grand Prix Cycliste de Québec
5th Antwerp Port Epic
9th Overall Tour of Belgium
2025
1st Stage 3 (TTT) Paris–Nice
5th Overall Four Days of Dunkirk
2026 (2)
1st Paris–Tours
1st Antwerp Port Epic
1st Stage 1 (TTT) Tour de France
1st Stage 3 (TTT) Tour Auvergne-Rhône-Alpes
2nd E3 Saxo Classic
10th Tro-Bro Léon
