= Hugo Page =

French bicycle racer

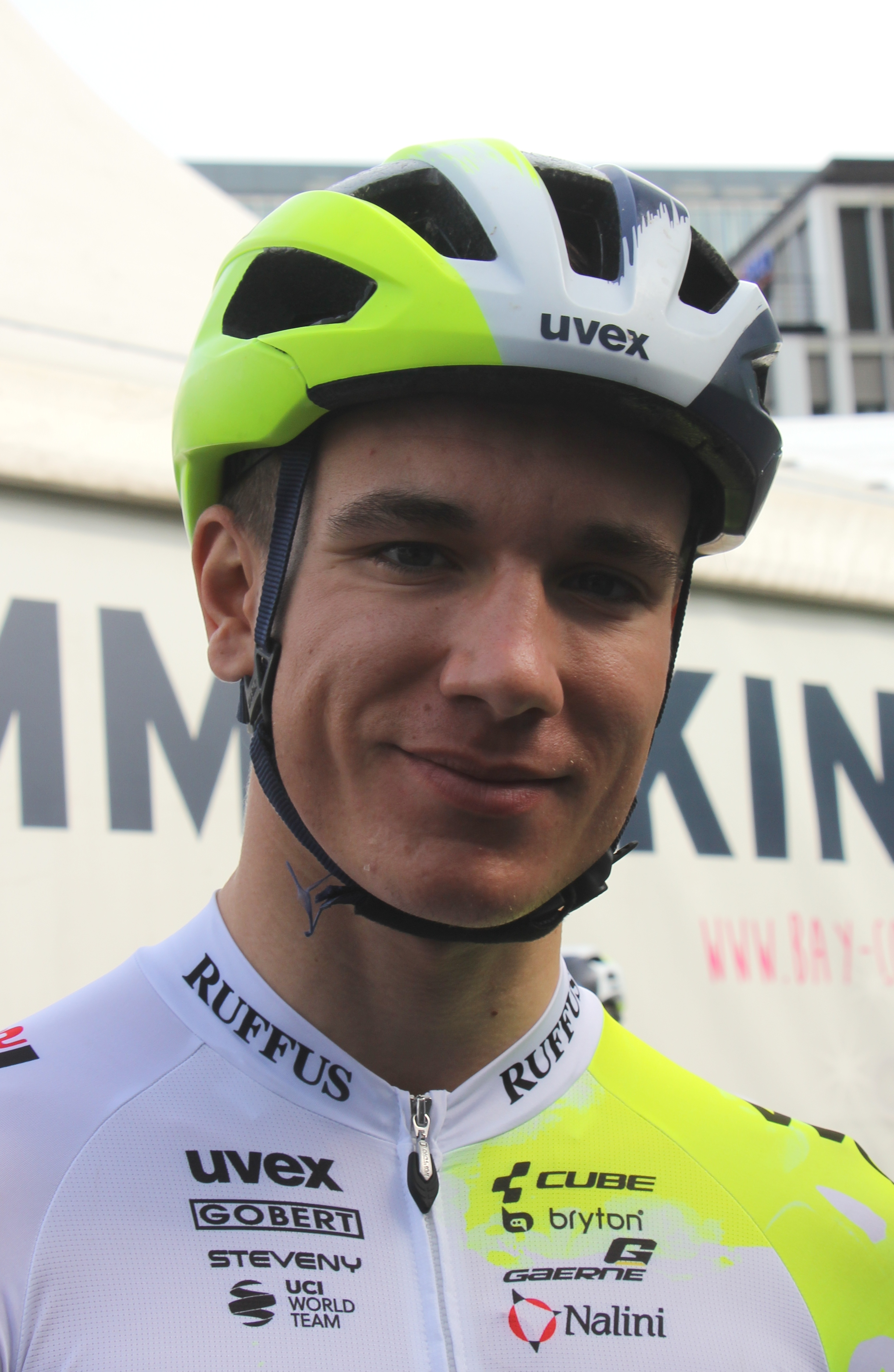
- Page, Rund um Köln, 2023

Personal information
- Born: 24 July 2001 (age 25) Chartres, France
- Height: 1.85 m (6 ft 1 in)
- Weight: 71 kg (157 lb)

Cycling career
- Sport: Cycling
- Current team: Cofidis
- Discipline: Road
- Role: Rider

Amateur team
- 2015–2019: ES Auneau

Professional teams
- 2020–2021: Équipe Continentale Groupama–FDJ
- 2022–2025: Intermarché–Wanty–Gobert Matériaux
- 2026–: Cofidis

Hugo Page (born 24 July 2001) is a French cyclist, who currently rides for UCI ProTeam Cofidis.

== Major results ==
2018
1st Overall Tour des Portes du Pays d'Othe

1st Young rider classification
1st Stage 2 (TTT)

1st Bernaudeau Junior
9th Overall Tour du Pays de Vaud

1st Stage 3a

10th Chrono des Nations Juniors
2019
1st Time trial, National Junior Road Championships
1st Chrono des Nations Juniors
2nd La Route des Géants
7th Time trial, UEC European Junior Road Championships
7th GP Général Patton
10th Bernaudeau Junior
2021
5th Overall L'Etoile d'Or
8th Overall Tour d'Eure-et-Loir
9th Paris–Troyes
2022
3rd Binche–Chimay–Binche
5th Classic Loire Atlantique
5th Famenne Ardenne Classic
2023 (1 pro win)
1st Stage 4 Tour du Limousin
2nd Cadel Evans Great Ocean Road Race
6th Polynormande
2024
5th Grand Prix de Fourmies
5th Grand Prix de Denain
8th Trofeo Calvià
10th Bretagne Classic
2025
6th Copenhagen Sprint
2026 (1)
1st Polynormande

=== Grand Tour general classification results timeline ===
Grand Tour	2023	2024	2026
Giro d'Italia	—	—	
Tour de France	—	117	119
Vuelta a España	127	—	
