= List of career achievements by Mathieu van der Poel =

Career achievements of cyclist Mathieu van der Poel

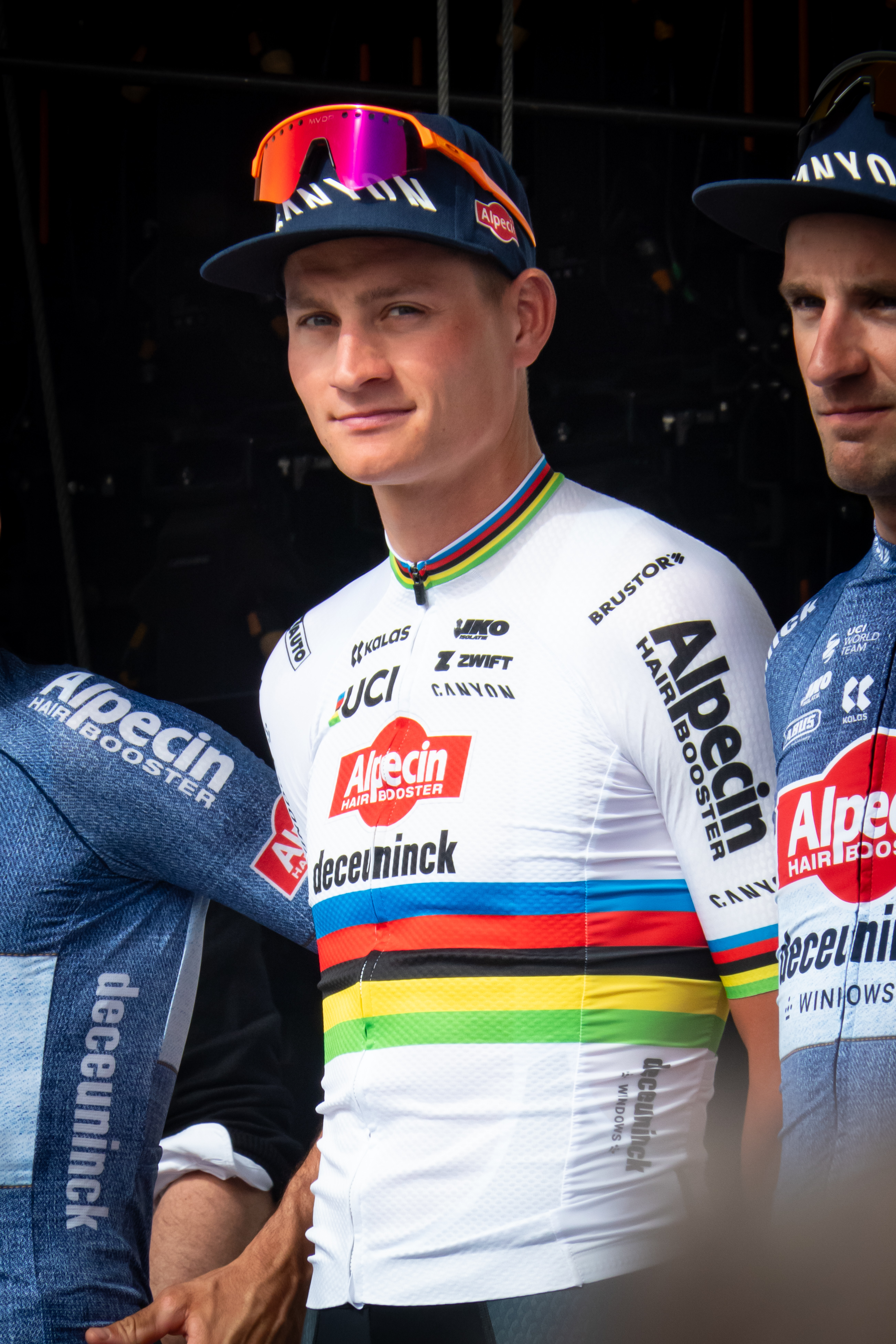
- Van der Poel in his rainbow jersey, 2024.

Cycling career
- Sport: Cycling

Major wins
- Cyclo-cross World Championships (2015, 2019, 2020, 2021, 2023, 2024, 2025, 2026) European Championships (2017–2019) National Championships (2015–2020) World Cup (2017–18, 2025–26) 51 individual wins (2014–15—2020–21, 2022–23—2025–26) Superprestige (2014–15, 2016–17, 2017–18, 2018–19) Trophy (2017–18, 2018–19) Gravel World Championships (2024) Mountain bike European XC Championships (2019) National XC Championships (2018) XC World Cup 3 individual wins (2019) Road Grand Tours Tour de France 4 individual stages (2021, 2025, 2026) Giro d'Italia 1 individual stage (2022) Combativity award (2022) Stage races BinckBank Tour (2020) Tour of Belgium (2023) Tour of Britain (2019) One-day races and Classics World Road Race Championships (2023) National Road Race Championships (2018, 2020) Milan–San Remo (2023, 2025) Tour of Flanders (2020, 2022, 2024) Paris–Roubaix (2023, 2024, 2025) Amstel Gold Race (2019) Strade Bianche (2021) E3 Saxo Classic (2024, 2025, 2026) Dwars door Vlaanderen (2019, 2022) Omloop Het Nieuwsblad (2026) Brabantse Pijl (2019) GP de Denain (2019) GP de Wallonie (2022) Super 8 Classic (2023)
Medal record
Representing Netherlands
Men's cyclo-cross
World Championships
Gold medal – first place	2026 Hulst	Elite
Gold medal – first place	2025 Liévin	Elite
Gold medal – first place	2024 Tábor	Elite
Gold medal – first place	2023 Hoogerheide	Elite
Gold medal – first place	2021 Ostend	Elite
Gold medal – first place	2020 Dübendorf	Elite
Gold medal – first place	2019 Bogense	Elite
Gold medal – first place	2015 Tábor	Elite
Gold medal – first place	2013 Louisville	Junior
Gold medal – first place	2012 Koksijde	Junior
Silver medal – second place	2017 Bieles	Elite
Bronze medal – third place	2018 Valkenburg	Elite
Bronze medal – third place	2014 Hoogerheide	Under-23
European Championships
Gold medal – first place	2019 Silvelle	Elite
Gold medal – first place	2018 Rosmalen	Elite
Gold medal – first place	2017 Tábor	Elite
Gold medal – first place	2012 Ipswich	Junior
Gold medal – first place	2011 Lucca	Junior
Silver medal – second place	2016 Pontchâteau	Elite
Silver medal – second place	2013 Mladá Boleslav	Under-23
Men's road cycling
World Championships
Gold medal – first place	2023 Glasgow	Elite road race
Gold medal – first place	2013 Florence	Junior road race
Bronze medal – third place	2024 Zurich	Elite road race
Bronze medal – third place	2026 Montreal	Elite road race
European Championships
Silver medal – second place	2018 Glasgow	Elite road race
Men's mountain bike racing
World Championships
Bronze medal – third place	2018 Lenzerheide	Elite cross-country
European Championships
Gold medal – first place	2019 Brno	Elite cross-country
Men's gravel bicycle racing
World Championships
Gold medal – first place	2024 Flemish Brabant	Elite
Bronze medal – third place	2022 Veneto	Elite

Mathieu van der Poel is a Dutch professional racing cyclist for UCI WorldTeam Alpecin–Premier Tech, competing in the cyclo-cross, road bicycle racing, mountain bike racing and gravel cycling disciplines of the sport.

== Career highlights ==
2015

- Wins his first National Cyclo-cross Championship title.
- Wins his first UCI Cyclo-cross World Championship title.

2016

- Wins his second National Cyclo-cross Championship title.

2017

- Wins his third National Cyclo-cross Championship title.
- Wins his first UEC European Cyclo-cross Championship title.

2018

- Wins his fourth National Cyclo-cross Championship title.
- Wins his first UCI Cyclo-cross World Cup title.
- Wins his first National Road Championship title.
- Wins his first National XCO Championship title.
- Wins his second UEC European Cyclo-cross Championship title.

2019

- Wins his fifth National Cyclo-cross Championship title.
- Wins his second UCI Cyclo-cross World Championship title.
- Wins his first three major classics; Dwars door Vlaanderen, Brabantse Pijl and Amstel Gold Race.
- Wins his first UEC European XCO Championship title.
- Wins his third UEC European Cyclo-cross Championship title.

2020

- Wins his sixth National Cyclo-cross Championship title.
- Wins his third UCI Cyclo-cross World Championship title.
- Wins his first Monument, Tour of Flanders.
- Wins his second National Road Championship title.
- Wins his first UCI World Tour stage race, BinckBank Tour.

2021

- Wins his fourth UCI Cyclo-cross World Championship title.
- Wins Strade Bianche.
- Wins his first Grand Tour stage, Tour de France Stage 2, wearing the yellow jersey in the process.

2022

- Wins Dwars door Vlaanderen for the second time.
- Wins his second Monument, Tour of Flanders for the second time.
- Wins his second Grand Tour stage, Giro d'Italia Stage 1, wearing the pink jersey in the process.

2023

- Wins his fifth UCI Cyclo-cross World Championship title.
- Wins his third Monument, Milan–San Remo.
- Wins his fourth Monument, Paris–Roubaix.
- Wins his first UCI Road World Championships title.

2024

- Wins his sixth UCI Cyclo-cross World Championship title.
- Wins E3 Saxo Classic.
- Wins his fifth Monument, Tour of Flanders for the third time.
- Wins his sixth Monument, Paris–Roubaix for the second time.
- Wins his first UCI Gravel World Championships title.

2025

- Wins his seventh UCI Cyclo-cross World Championship title.
- Wins his seventh Monument, Milan–San Remo for the second time.
- Wins E3 Saxo Classic for the second time.
- Wins his eighth Monument, Paris–Roubaix for the third time.
- Wins his third Grand Tour stage, Tour de France Stage 2, wearing the yellow jersey in the process.

2026

- Wins his second UCI Cyclo-cross World Cup title.
- Wins his eighth UCI Cyclo-cross World Championship title.
- Wins Omloop Het Nieuwsblad.
- Wins E3 Saxo Classic for the third time.
- Wins his fourth Grand Tour stage, Tour de France Stage 9.
- Wins his fifth Grand Tour stage, Tour de France Stage 21.

== Career achievements ==
=== Major championships timeline ===
Event		2015	2016	2017	2018	2019	2020	2021	2022	2023	2024	2025	2026
Olympic Games	MTB XC	NH	—	Not held				DNF	Not held		—	Not held	
Olympic Games	Road race	NH	—	Not held				—	Not held		12	Not held	
World Championships	Cyclo-cross	1	5	2	3	1	1	1	—	1	1	1	1
World Championships	Gravel	Not held							3	—	1	—	
World Championships	MTB XC	—	—	—	3	—	—	—	—	DNF	—	29	30
World Championships	MTB XCM	—	—	4	—	—	—	—	—	—	—	—	
World Championships	Road race	—	—	—	—	43	—	8	DNF	1	3	—	3
European Championships	Cyclo-cross	—	2	1	1	1	—	—	—	—	—	—	—
European Championships	Gravel	Not held								—	—	—	—
European Championships	MTB XC	—	DNF	—	DNF	1	—	—	—	—	—	—	—
European Championships	Road race	—	—	—	2	—	4	—	—	—	30	—	—
National Championships	Cyclo-cross	1	1	1	1	1	1	NH	—	—	—	—	—
National Championships	Gravel	Not held						—	—	—	—	—	—
National Championships	MTB XC	—	—	—	1	—	—	—	—	—	—	—	—
National Championships	Road race	—	33	—	1	—	1	DNF	—	3	—	—	

=== Cyclo-cross ===
2009-2010
Novice World Cup

1st Koksijde

Novice Superprestige

1st Gavere
1st Hamme
1st Gieten
1st Diegem
1st Zonhoven
1st Vorselaar

Novice Gazet van Antwerpen Trophy

1st Hasselt
1st Essen
1st Loenhout
1st Lille

1st Novice Horendonk
1st Novice Neerpelt
1st Novice Lochristi
1st Novice Breda
1st Novice Ossendrecht
1st Novice Overijse
1st Novice Woerden
1st Novice Langemark
1st Novice Zonnebeke
1st Novice Eeklo
1st Novice Lebbeke
2nd National Novice Championships
2010-2011
1st National Novice Championships
Novice Superprestige

1st Ruddervoorde
1st Hamme
1st Gavere
1st Gieten
1st Middelkerke

1st Overall Novice Gazet van Antwerpen Trophy

1st Namur
1st Koppenberg
1st Hasselt
1st Essen
1st Loenhout
1st Baal
1st Oostmalle

1st Novice Erpe-Mere
1st Novice Harderwijk
1st Novice Neerpelt
1st Novice Montfoort
1st Novice Albrandswaard
1st Novice Zingem
1st Novice Beesel
1st Novice Veldhoven I
1st Novice Rhenen
1st Novice Hilversum
1st Novice Veldhoven II
1st Novice Moergestel
1st Novice Beernem
1st Novice Huijbergen
1st Novice Cauberg
2011–2012
1st UCI World Junior Championships
1st UEC European Junior Championships
1st National Junior Championships
1st Overall UCI Junior World Cup

1st Tábor
1st Koksijde
1st Liévin
1st Hoogerheide

1st Overall Junior Superprestige

1st Zonhoven
1st Hamme
1st Gavere
1st Gieten
1st Diegem
1st Hoogstraten
1st Middelkerke

Junior Gazet van Antwerpen

1st Hasselt
1st Essen
1st Loenhout
1st Baal
1st Oostmalle

Junior Fidea Classics

1st Namur

1st Junior Erpe-Mere
1st Junior Kalmthout
1st Junior Woerden
1st Junior Overijse
1st Junior Heusden-Zolder
1st Junior Valkenburg
2012–2013
1st UCI World Junior Championships
1st UEC European Junior Championships
1st National Junior Championships
1st Overall UCI Junior World Cup

1st Tábor
1st Plzeň
1st Koksijde
1st Heusden-Zolder
1st Rome
1st Hoogerheide

1st Overall Junior Superprestige

1st Ruddervoorde
1st Zonhoven
1st Hamme
1st Gavere
1st Gieten
1st Diegem
1st Hoogstraten
1st Middelkerke

Junior Bpost Bank Trophy

1st Ronse
1st Koppenberg
1st Hasselt
1st Essen
1st Loenhout
1st Baal
1st Lille
1st Oostmalle

1st Junior Stabroek
1st Junior Kalmthout
1st Junior Frankfurt
1st Junior Huijbergen
1st Junior Cauberg
2013–2014 (1 pro win)
1st National Under-23 Championships
1st Overall UCI Under-23 World Cup

1st Tábor
1st Koksijde
1st Heusden-Zolder
1st Rome

1st Overall Under-23 Superprestige

1st Ruddervoorde
1st Hamme
1st Gieten
1st Diegem

Under-23 Bpost Bank Trophy

1st Ronse

1st Heerlen
1st Under-23 Kalmthout
2nd UEC European Under-23 Championships
3rd UCI World Under-23 Championships
2014–2015 (11)
1st UCI World Championships
1st National Championships
UCI World Cup

1st Hoogerheide

1st Overall Superprestige

1st Gieten
1st Diegem
1st Hoogstraten

Bpost Bank Trophy

1st Lille

Soudal Classics

1st Antwerpen
1st Leuven
1st Waregem

1st Sint-Niklaas
1st Heerlen
2015–2016 (11)
1st National Championships
UCI World Cup

1st Namur
1st Heusden-Zolder
1st Lignières-en-Berry
1st Hoogerheide

Superprestige

1st Diegem
1st Hoogstraten
1st Middelkerke

1st Overijse
1st Otegem
1st Zonnebeke
5th UCI World Championships
2016–2017 (22)
1st National Championships
UCI World Cup

1st Cauberg
1st Zeven
1st Namur

1st Overall Superprestige

1st Gieten
1st Zonhoven
1st Ruddervoorde
1st Gavere
1st Diegem
1st Hoogstraten
1st Middelkerke

DVV Verzekeringen Trophy

1st Hamme
1st Antwerpen
1st Lille

Brico Cross

1st Meulebeke
1st Maldegem
1st Hulst

Soudal Classics

1st Leuven

1st Brabant
1st Mol
1st Overijse
1st Otegem
2nd UCI World Championships
2nd UEC European Championships
2017–2018 (31)
1st UEC European Championships
1st National Championships
1st Overall UCI World Cup

1st Iowa City
1st Waterloo
1st Koksijde
1st Bogense
1st Heusden-Zolder
1st Nommay
1st Hoogerheide

1st Overall Superprestige

1st Gieten
1st Zonhoven
1st Ruddervoorde
1st Diegem
1st Hoogstraten
1st Middelkerke

1st Overall DVV Verzekeringen Trophy

1st Koppenberg
1st Hamme
1st Essen
1st Antwerpen
1st Loenhout
1st Baal
1st Lille

Brico Cross

1st Eeklo
1st Meulebeke
1st Kruibeke
1st Hulst

Soudal Classics

1st Waregem

1st Waterloo
1st Brabant
1st Overijse
1st Otegem
1st Oostmalle
3rd UCI World Championships
2018–2019 (32)
1st UCI World Championships
1st UEC European Championships
1st National Championships
3rd Overall UCI World Cup

1st Bern
1st Tábor
1st Koksijde
1st Namur
1st Heusden-Zolder
1st Hoogerheide

1st Overall Superprestige

1st Gieten
1st Boom
1st Ruddervoorde
1st Gavere
1st Zonhoven
1st Diegem
1st Hoogstraten
1st Middelkerke

1st Overall DVV Verzekeringen Trophy

1st Niel
1st Hamme
1st Antwerpen
1st Loenhout
1st Baal
1st Brussels
1st Lille

Brico Cross

1st Meulebeke
1st Ronse
1st Maldegem
1st Hulst

Soudal Classics

1st Sint-Niklaas

1st Wachtebeke
1st Gullegem
1st Otegem
2019–2020 (24)
1st UCI World Championships
1st UEC European Championships
1st National Championships
UCI World Cup

1st Tábor
1st Koksijde
1st Namur
1st Heusden-Zolder
1st Hoogerheide

Superprestige

1st Ruddervoorde
1st Diegem

3rd Overall DVV Verzekeringen Trophy

1st Hamme
1st Kortrijk
1st Loenhout
1st Baal
1st Brussels

Ethias Cross

1st Bredene

Rectavit Series

1st Niel
1st Sint-Niklaas

1st Wachtebeke
1st Mol
1st Overijse
1st Gullegem
1st Otegem
1st Zonnebeke
2020–2021 (10)
1st UCI World Championships
2nd Overall UCI World Cup

1st Namur
1st Hulst

Superprestige

1st Heusden-Zolder

X²O Badkamers Trophy

1st Antwerpen
1st Baal
1st Hamme

Ethias Cross

1st Essen
1st Bredene

1st Gullegem
2022–2023 (7)
1st UCI World Championships
UCI World Cup

1st Hulst
1st Antwerpen
1st Gavere
1st Benidorm
1st Besançon

X²O Badkamers Trophy

1st Herentals

2023–2024 (13)
1st UCI World Championships
UCI World Cup

1st Antwerpen
1st Gavere
1st Hulst
1st Zonhoven
1st Hoogerheide

Superprestige

1st Diegem

X²O Badkamers Trophy

1st Herentals
1st Baal
1st Koksijde
1st Hamme

Exact Cross

1st Mol
1st Loenhout

2024–2025 (8)
1st UCI World Championships
UCI World Cup

1st Zonhoven
1st Gavere
1st Besançon
1st Maasmechelen
1st Hoogerheide

Superprestige

1st Mol

Exact Cross

1st Loenhout

2025–2026 (13)
1st UCI World Championships
1st Overall UCI World Cup

1st Namur
1st Antwerpen
1st Koksijde
1st Gavere
1st Zonhoven
1st Benidorm
1st Maasmechelen
1st Hoogerheide

X²O Badkamers Trophy

1st Hofstade
1st Loenhout
1st Baal

Exact Cross

1st Mol

==== UCI World Cup results ====
Season	1	2	3	4	5	6	7	8	9	10	11	12	13	14	15	16	Rank	Points
2014–2015	VAL —	KOK; 3	MIL —	NAM —	ZOL —	HOO; 1											25	145
2015–2016	LAS —	VAL —	KOK; 3	NAM; 1	ZOL; 1	LIG; 1	HOO; 1										5	385
2016–2017	LAS —	IOW —	VAL; 1	KOK; NH	ZEV; 1	NAM; 1	ZOL; 14	FIU —	HOO; 24								8	304
2017–2018	IOW; 1	WAT; 1	KOK; 1	BOG; 1	ZEV; 2	NAM; 3	ZOL; 1	NOM; 1	HOO; 1								1	695
2018–2019	WAT —	IOW —	BER; 1	TAB; 1	KOK; 1	NAM; 1	ZOL; 1	PON —	HOO; 1								3	480
2019–2020	IOW —	WAT —	BER —	TAB; 1	KOK; 1	NAM; 1	ZOL; 1	NOM —	HOO; 1								8	400
2020–2021	WAT; NH	DUB; NH	ZON; NH	KOK; NH	BES; NH	TAB —	ANT; NH	NAM; 1	DIE; NH	DEN; 2	HUL; 1	VIL; NH	HOO; NH	OVE; 2			2	140
2021–2022	WAT —	FAY —	IOW —	ZON —	OVE —	TAB —	KOK —	ANT; NH	BES —	VAL —	RUC —	NAM —	DEN; 2	HUL —	FLA —	HOO —	35	30
2022–2023	WAT —	FAY —	TAB —	MAA —	BER —	OVE —	HUL; 1	ANT; 1	DUB —	VAL; 8	GAV; 1	ZON; 2	BEN; 1	BES; 1			6	248
2023–2024	WAT —	MAA —	DEN —	TRO —	DUB —	FLA —	VAL —	NAM —	ANT; 1	GAV; 1	HUL; 1	ZON; 1	BEN; 5	HOO; 1			6	221
2024–2025	ANT —	DUB —	CAB; NH	NAM —	HUL —	ZON; 1	GAV; 1	BES; 1	DEN —	BEN —	MAA; 1	HOO; 1					4	200
2025–2026	TAB —	FLA —	TER —	NAM; 1	ANT; 1	KOK; 1	GAV; 1	DEN —	ZON; 1	BEN; 1	MAA; 1	HOO; 1					1	320

==== Superprestige results ====
Season	1	2	3	4	5	6	7	8	Rank	Points
2014–2015	GIE; 1	ZON; 5	RUD; 2	GAV; 6	SPA; 4	DIE; 1	HOO; 1	MID; 2	1	106
2015–2016	GIE —	ZON —	RUD —	GAV —	SPA; 12	DIE; 1	HOO; 1	MID; 1	8	49
2016–2017	GIE; 1	ZON; 1	RUD; 1	GAV; 1	SPA; 2	DIE; 1	HOO; 1	MID; 1	1	119
2017–2018	GIE; 1	ZON; 1	BOO; 4	RUD; 1	GAV; 3	DIE; 1	HOO; 1	MID; 1	1	115
2018–2019	GIE; 1	BOO; 1	RUD; 1	GAV; 1	ZON; 1	DIE; 1	HOO; 1	MID; 1	1	120
2019–2020	GIE —	BOO —	GAV —	RUD; 1	ZON —	DIE; 1	MER; NH	MID —	12	30
2020–2021	GIE —	RUD —	NIE —	MER —	BOO —	GAV; 2	ZOL; 1	MID —	12	29
2021–2022	GIE —	RUD —	NIE —	MER —	BOO —	ZOL; DNF	DIE; NH	GAV —	—	—
2022–2023	RUD —	NIE —	MER —	BOO; 13	ZOL; 2	DIE; 3	GUL —	MID —	12	30
2023–2024	OVE —	RUD —	NIE —	MER —	BOO —	ZOL —	DIE; 1	MID —	22	15
2024–2025	RUD —	OVE —	NIE —	MER —	MOL; 1	DIE —	GUL —	MID —	19	15

==== Trofee results ====
Season	1	2	3	4	5	6	7	8	Rank	Time
2014–2015	RON; 2	OUD —	HAM; 2	HAS —	ESS —	LOE; 2	BAA —	LIL; 1	10	+20:18"
2015–2016	RON —	OUD —	HAM; 5	ESS; 8	ANT; 2	LOE; 7	BAA —	SIN; 22	16	+24:43"
2016–2017	RON; 4	OUD; 15	HAM; 1	ESS; 16	ANT; 1	LOE; DNF	BAA —	LIL; 1	11	+18:05"
2017–2018	RON; 2	OUD; 1	HAM; 1	ESS; 1	ANT; 1	LOE; 1	BAA; 1	LIL; 1	1	8:01:06
2018–2019	OUD; 21	NIE; 1	HAM; 1	ANT; 1	LOE; 1	BAA; 1	BRU; 1	LIL; 1	1	8:07:41
2019–2020	OUD —	HAM; 1	KOR; 1	RON; 3	LOE; 1	BAA; 1	BRU; 1	LIL —	3	+7:43"
2020–2021	OUD —	KOR —	ANT; 1	HER; 2	BAA; 1	HAM; 1	LIL —	BRU —	8	+14:40"
2021–2022	OUD —	KOR —	LOE —	BAA —	HER —	HAM —	LIL —	BRU —	—	—
2022–2023	OUD —	KOR —	BAA —	HER; 1	KOK; 2	HAM —	LIL —	BRU —	14	+28:30"
2023–2024	OUD —	KOR —	HER; 1	BAA; 1	KOK; 1	HAM; 1	LIL —	BRU —	5	+8:53"
2024–2025	OUD —	LOK —	HAM —	HER —	BAA —	KOK —	LIL —	BRU —	—	—
2025–2026	OUD —	LOK —	HAM —	HOF; 1	LOE; 1	BAA; 1	LIL —	BRU —	10	+16:04"

=== Gravel ===
2022
3rd UCI World Championships
2024
1st UCI World Championships

=== Mountain bike ===
2016
1st GP Stad Beringen
1st Stage 1 Afxentia Stage Race
2017 (3 pro wins)
1st Overall Belgian Challenge

1st Stages 1 & 2

UCI XCO World Cup

2nd Albstadt

4th Marathon, UCI World Championships
2018 (8)
1st Cross-country, National Championships
1st Overall La Rioja Bike Race

1st Stages 1, 2 & 3

2nd Overall UCI XCO World Cup

3rd Albstadt
3rd Val di Sole
3rd Vallnord
4th Stellenbosch
4th La Bresse

UCI XCC World Cup

1st Albstadt
1st Val di Sole
1st La Bresse

3rd Cross-country, UCI World Championships
2019 (14)
1st Cross-country, UEC European Championships
1st Overall Belgian Challenge

1st Prologue, Stages 1, 2 & 3

2nd Overall UCI XCO World Cup

1st Nové Město
1st Val di Sole
1st Lenzerheide
2nd Albstadt

UCI XCC World Cup

1st Albstadt
1st Nové Město
1st Les Gets
1st Val di Sole
1st Lenzerheide

2021 (2)
UCI XCO World Cup

2nd Nové Město

UCI XCC World Cup

1st Albstadt
1st Nové Město

2026
UCI XCO World Cup

2nd Les Gets

==== UCI World Cup results ====
Season	1	2	3	4	5	6	7	8	9	10	Rank	Points
2016	CAI; 32	ALB; 34	LAB; 91	LEN —	MON —	AND —					58	80
2017	NOV; 8	ALB; 2	AND; DNF	LEN; 10	MON —	VAL —					18	405
2018	STE; 4	ALB; 3	NOV; DNF	VAL; 3	AND; 3	MON —	LAB; 4				2	1355
2019	ALB; 2	NOV; 1	AND —	LES; 16	VAL; 1	LEN; 1	SNO —				2	1649
2021	ALB; 7	NOV; 2	LEO —	LES —	LEN —	SNO —					17	570
2025	ARA —	ARA —	NOV; DNF	LEO —	VAL —	AND —	LES; 6	LEN —	LAK —	MON —	67	130
2026	KOR —	NOV —	LEO —	LEN —	THU —	AND —	LES; 2	SLC —	LAK —			

=== Road ===
2012
1st Overall Ronde des Vallées

1st Young rider classification

1st Mountains classification, Trofeo Karlsberg
2nd Remouchamps-Ferrières-Remouchamps
3rd Grand Prix Bati-Metallo
4th Overall Regio-Tour
6th Overall Tour du Valromey

1st Young rider classification

9th Road race, UCI World Junior Championships
2013
1st Road race, UCI World Junior Championships
1st Road race, National Junior Championships
1st Overall Grand Prix Rüebliland

1st Points classification
1st Stages 1, 2 & 3 (ITT)

1st Overall Tour du Valromey

1st Stages 1 & 4

1st Overall Trophée Centre Morbihan

1st Points classification
1st Stage 1

2nd Overall GP Général Patton

1st Points classification
1st Mountains classification
1st Stage 2

3rd Overall Course de la Paix Juniors

1st Stage 1

2014 (1 pro win)
1st Overall Baltic Chain Tour

1st Sprints classification
1st Young rider classification
1st Stage 4

1st Ronde van Limburg
2nd Grote Prijs Jean-Pierre Monseré
6th Overall Tour Alsace

1st Stage 3

7th Omloop der Kempen
10th Road race, UCI World Under-23 Championships
2015
4th Overall Tour Alsace
6th Overall Tour of Belgium
6th Circuit de Wallonie
2016
4th Grote Prijs Jean-Pierre Monseré
8th Ronde van Limburg
2017 (5)
1st Overall Boucles de la Mayenne

1st Points classification
1st Young rider classification
1st Stages 2 & 3

1st Dwars door het Hageland
1st Stage 2 Tour of Belgium
2nd Bruges Cycling Classic
2018 (6)
1st Road race, National Championships
1st Overall Boucles de la Mayenne

1st Stage 1

1st Ronde van Limburg
Arctic Race of Norway

1st Points classification
1st Stages 1 & 4

2nd Road race, UEC European Championships
6th Nationale Sluitingsprijs
2019 (10)
1st Overall Tour of Britain

1st Stages 4, 7 & 8

1st Amstel Gold Race
1st Brabantse Pijl
1st Dwars door Vlaanderen
1st Grand Prix de Denain
1st Stage 1 Tour of Antalya
1st Stage 1 Arctic Race of Norway
4th Gent–Wevelgem
4th Tour of Flanders
6th Famenne Ardenne Classic
10th Overall Circuit de la Sarthe

1st Stage 1

2020 (5)
1st Road race, National Championships
1st Overall BinckBank Tour

1st Stage 5

1st Tour of Flanders
1st Stage 7 Tirreno–Adriatico
2nd Brabantse Pijl
3rd Gran Piemonte
3rd Druivenkoers Overijse
4th Road race, UEC European Championships
6th Liège–Bastogne–Liège
9th Gent–Wevelgem
10th Giro di Lombardia
2021 (8)
1st Strade Bianche
1st Antwerp Port Epic
Tour de France

1st Stage 2
Held after Stages 2–7
Held after Stage 2

Tirreno–Adriatico

1st Stages 3 & 5

Tour de Suisse

1st Stages 2 & 3

1st Stage 1 UAE Tour
2nd Tour of Flanders
3rd Paris–Roubaix
3rd E3 Saxo Bank Classic
5th Milan–San Remo
8th Road race, UCI World Championships
8th Primus Classic
2022 (5)
1st Tour of Flanders
1st Dwars door Vlaanderen
1st Grand Prix de Wallonie
Giro d'Italia

1st Stage 1
Held after Stages 1–3
Held after Stages 1–4
Held after Stages 1–2
Combativity award Stages 17, 21 & Overall

1st Stage 4 Settimana Internazionale di Coppi e Bartali
3rd Milan–San Remo
4th Amstel Gold Race
9th Paris–Roubaix
2023 (6)
1st Road race, UCI World Championships
1st Overall Tour of Belgium

1st Points classification
1st Stage 4

1st Milan–San Remo
1st Paris–Roubaix
1st Super 8 Classic
2nd Tour of Flanders
2nd E3 Saxo Classic
3rd Road race, National Championships
4th Grand Prix de Wallonie
Combativity award Stage 12 Tour de France
2024 (4)
1st Tour of Flanders
1st Paris–Roubaix
1st E3 Saxo Classic
2nd Overall Tour de Luxembourg

1st Points classification
1st Stage 1

2nd Gent–Wevelgem
3rd Road race, UCI World Championships
3rd Liège–Bastogne–Liège
10th Milan–San Remo
2025 (6)
1st Milan–San Remo
1st Paris–Roubaix
1st E3 Saxo Classic
1st Le Samyn
Tour de France

1st Stage 2
Held after Stages 2–4 & 6

2nd Overall Renewi Tour

1st Stage 3

3rd Tour of Flanders
2026 (8)
1st Omloop Het Nieuwsblad
1st E3 Saxo Classic
Tour de France

1st Stages 9 & 21
Combativity award Stage 9

Tirreno–Adriatico

1st Stages 2 & 4

Tour de Luxembourg

1st Points classification
1st Mountains classification
1st Stages 1 & 5

2nd Tour of Flanders
3rd Road race, UCI World Championships
4th Paris–Roubaix
8th Milan–San Remo

==== Grand Tour general classification results timeline ====
Grand Tour	2021	2022	2023	2024	2025	2026
Giro d'Italia	—	57	—	—	—	—
Tour de France	DNF	DNF	57	96	DNF	75
Vuelta a España	—	—	—	—	—	—

==== Classics results timeline ====
Monument	2019	2020	2021	2022	2023	2024	2025	2026
Milan–San Remo	—	13	5	3	1	10	1	8
Tour of Flanders	4	1	2	1	2	1	3	2
Paris–Roubaix	—	NH	3	9	1	1	1	4
Liège–Bastogne–Liège	—	6	—	—	—	3	—	—
Giro di Lombardia	—	10	—	—	—	—	—	—
Classic	2019	2020	2021	2022	2023	2024	2025	2026
Omloop Het Nieuwsblad	—	—	—	—	—	—	—	1
Strade Bianche	—	15	1	—	15	—	—	—
E3 Saxo Bank Classic	—	NH	3	—	2	1	1	1
Gent–Wevelgem	4	9	—	—	—	2	—	35
Dwars door Vlaanderen	1	NH	58	1	—	—	—	—
Brabantse Pijl	1	2	—	—	—	—	—	—
Amstel Gold Race	1	NH	—	4	—	22	—	—

Statistics

These tables include number of race days and first-, second-, third-place, top 3 and top 10 finishes of Monuments, Cobbled monuments, Cobbled classics and World Tour cobbled races.

Monuments
Result	No.	Pct.
Wins	8	33,33%
2nd	3	12,50%
3rd	4	16,67%
Top 3	15	62,50%
Top 10	23	95,83%
Days	24	100%

Cobbled monuments
Result	No.	Pct.
Wins	6	42,86%
2nd	3	21,43%
3rd	2	14,29%
Top 3	11	78,57%
Top 10	14	100,00%
Days	14	100%

Cobbled classics
Result	No.	Pct.
Wins	9	39,13%
2nd	5	21,74%
3rd	3	13,04%
Top 3	17	73,91%
Top 10	22	95,65%
Days	23	100%

World Tour cobbled races
Result	No.	Pct.
Wins	12	44,44%
2nd	5	18,52%
3rd	3	11,11%
Top 3	20	74,07%
Top 10	25	92,59%
Days	27	100%

Criterium and National races

2011
1st Time trial, National Novice Championships
1st Novice Tour of Huijbergen
1st Novice Course Temse
1st Novice Omloop van Margraten
1st Novice Grand Prix Houtsaeger
1st Time trial, South West Novice District Championships
1st Novice Climbing Course Harzé
1st Novice Polleur-Stoumont-Polleur
1st Novice Course Minderhout
1st Novice Druivenkoers Overijse
2012
1st Overall Junior Acht van Bladel

1st Points classification
1st Young rider classification
1st Stages 1 & 3 (ITT)

1st Junior Omloop van Borsele
1st Junior Course Temse
1st Junior Omloop van Margraten
1st Junior Course Geraardsbergen
1st Junior Tour of Huijbergen
1st Junior Omloop van de Maasvallei
1st Junior Tour of Wolder
1st Junior Climbing Course Harzé
1st Junior Tour of the Low Country
1st Junior Mountain Omloop Simpelveld
1st Junior Climbing Course Herbeumont
1st Junior Course Ravels
2013
1st Overall Junior Tour des Portes du Pays d'Othe

1st Stages 1 & 2

1st Time trial, Junior Omloop van Borsele
1st Junior Course Wortegem-Petegem
1st Junior Isaac Kleeberg Challenge
1st Junior Mountain Criterium Wolder
1st Junior Climbing Course Harzé
1st Junior Draai van de Kaai
1st Junior Mountain Omloop Simpelveld
2014
1st Stage 1 Tour de Liège
2015
1st Stage 4 Tour de Liège
2016
1st Sint-Elooisprijs
2019
1st Antwerp
1st Draai van de Kaai
2022
1st Daags na de Tour
1st Profronde Surhuisterveen
1st RaboRonde Heerlen
1st Stadsprijs Geraardsbergen
1st Izegem Koers
2023
1st Aalst
1st Acht van Chaam
1st Profronde Etten-Leur
1st Madrid
2024
1st Roeselare
1st Profronde Etten-Leur
1st La Nucia

==== Number of wins per year ====
This table includes number of race days per year including general classification and first-, second-, third-place and top 3 finishes including UCI level 2 races.

	2013	2014	2015	2016	2017	2018	2019	2020	2021	2022	2023	2024	Total	%
Cyclo-cross wins	0	5	11	21	29	30	28	13	5	3	11	11	167	73,25
2nd	2	4	3	3	5	0	0	3	2	3	2	0	27	11,84
3rd	0	2	1	0	2	1	1	0	0	1	0	0	8	3,51
Top 3	2	11	15	24	36	31	29	16	7	7	13	11	202	88,60
Days	2	15	21	32	38	33	29	16	8	9	13	12	228	100
Gravel wins	0	0	0	0	0	0	0	0	0	0	0	1	1	50
2nd	0	0	0	0	0	0	0	0	0	0	0	0	0	0
3rd	0	0	0	0	0	0	0	0	0	1	0	0	1	50
Top 3	0	0	0	0	0	0	0	0	0	1	0	1	2	100
Days	0	0	0	0	0	0	0	0	0	1	0	1	2	100
Mountain bike wins	0	0	0	2	3	8	14	0	2	0	0	0	29	48,33
2nd	0	0	0	0	2	2	1	0	1	0	0	0	6	10
3rd	0	0	0	0	1	0	4	0	0	0	0	0	5	8,33
Top 3	0	0	0	0	3	5	14	15	3	0	0	0	40	66,67
Days	0	0	0	10	9	18	16	0	5	0	2	0	60	100
Road wins	0	4	0	0	5	6	11	5	8	5	6	4	54	16,17
2nd	0	1	1	0	2	3	2	1	2	2	3	4	21	6,29
3rd	0	3	0	0	3	0	0	2	2	2	1	2	15	4,49
Top 3	0	8	1	0	10	9	13	8	12	9	10	10	90	26,95
Days	0	25	19	7	21	15	35	33	38	49	49	43	334	100
Total wins	0	9	11	23	37	44	53	18	15	8	17	16	251	40,22
2nd	2	5	4	3	9	5	3	4	5	5	5	4	54	8,65
3rd	0	5	1	1	5	5	1	2	2	3	1	2	29	4,65
Top 3	2	19	16	27	51	54	57	24	22	16	23	11	327	53,26
Days	2	40	40	49	68	66	80	49	51	58	64	56	624	100

As of 31 December 2024

=== Records and honours ===
==== Global records ====
Cyclo-cross

- First double Men's Junior Cyclo-cross World Champion in 2012 and 2013.
- First double Men's Junior Cyclo-cross World Cup winner in 2011-2012 and 2012-2013.
- First double Men's Junior Cyclo-cross Superprestige winner in 2011-2012 and 2012-2013.
- Youngest Men's winner ever in the Cyclo-cross Superprestige in Gieten 2014 (19 years and 228 days).
- Youngest Men's winner ever in the UCI Cyclo-cross World Cup in Hoogerheide 2015 (20 years and 6 days).
- Youngest Men's Cyclo-cross World Champion ever in 2015 (20 years and 13 days).
- Youngest Men's Cyclo-cross Superprestige winner ever in 2014-2015 (20 years and 27 days).
- First Men's Junior Cyclo-cross World Cup winner, Men's Under -23 Cyclo-cross World Cup winner and Men's Elite Cyclo-cross World Cup winner in 2011-2012, 2012-2013, 2013-2014, 2017-2018 and 2025-2026.
- First Men's Junior Cyclo-cross Superprestige winner, Men's Under -23 Cyclo-cross Superprestige winner and Men's Elite Cyclo-cross Superprestige winner in 2011-2012, 2012-2013, 2013-2014, 2014-2015, 2016-2017, 2017-2018 and 2018-2019.
- Most wins in the Men's Cyclo-cross World Cup: 51.
- Most wins in a single Men's Cyclo-cross World Cup season: 8 in 2025-2026 (record shared with Sven Nys).
- Most wins in a single Men's Cyclo-cross Superprestige season: 8 in 2018-2019 (record shared with Sven Nys).
- Most wins in a single Men's Cyclo-cross Trophy season: 7 in 2017-2018 and 2018-2019.
- Most UCI wins in a single Men's Cyclo-cross season: 32 in 2018-2019.
- Most consecutive wins in the Men's Cyclo-cross World Cup in contested races: 15.
- Most consecutive wins in the Men's Cyclo-cross Superprestige in contested races: 13 (record shared with Sven Nys).
- Most consecutive wins in the Men's Cyclo-cross Trophy in contested races: 9.
- Most consecutive UCI Men's Cyclo-cross wins in contested races: 35.
- Most consecutive podium finishes in the Men's Cyclo-cross World Cup in contested races: 27.
- Most consecutive podium finishes in the Men's Cyclo-cross Trophy in contested races: 26.
- Most consecutive UCI Men's Cyclo-cross podium finishes in contested races: 66.
- Most Men's Cyclo-cross World Championships titles: 8 in 2015, 2019, 2020, 2021, 2023, 2024, 2025 and 2026.

Mountain bike

- First XCC winner ever in the Men's Mountain Bike World Cup in Albstadt 2018.
- First XCC and XCO winner in the same weekend ever in the Men's Mountain Bike World Cup in Nové Město 2019.
- Most XCC wins in the Men's Mountain Bike World Cup: 10.
- Most consecutive XCC wins in the Men's Mountain Bike World Cup in contested races: 8.

World Tour cobbled races

- Most Men's Dwars door Vlaanderen wins: 2 in 2019 and 2022 (record shared with 13 others).
- Most Men's Dwars door Vlaanderen and Men's Tour of Flanders wins: 5 (record shared with Johan Museeuw).
- Most consecutive podium finishes in contested Men's World Tour cobbled races between E3 Saxo Classic 2023 and E3 Saxo Classic 2026 : 12.
- Most consecutive top 10 finishes in contested Men's World Tour cobbled races between Tour of Flanders 2021 and E3 Saxo Classic 2026: 17.
- Highest Men's World Tour cobbled races win average ever: 12 out of 27 contested races.
- Highest Men's World Tour cobbled races podium average ever: 20 out of 27 contested races.
- Highest Men's World Tour cobbled races top 10 average ever: 25 out of 27 contested races.

Cobbled classics

- Most consecutive wins in E3 Saxo Classic, Tour of Flanders and Paris-Roubaix between Paris-Roubaix 2023 and E3 Saxo Classic 2025: 5 (record shared with Tom Boonen).
- Most consecutive podium finishes in E3 Saxo Classic, Tour of Flanders and Paris-Roubaix between E3 Saxo Classic 2023 and Tour of Flanders 2026: 11.
- Most consecutive podium finishes in contested Men's Cobbled Classics between E3 Saxo Classic 2023 and E3 Saxo Classic 2026: 11.
- Most consecutive top 10 finishes in contested Men's Cobbled Classics between Gent-Wevelgem 2019 and E3 Saxo Classic 2026: 20.
- Highest Men's Cobbled Classics win average ever: 9 out of 23 contested races.
- Highest Men's Cobbled Classics podium average ever: 17 out of 23 contested races.
- Highest Men's Cobbled Classics top 10 average ever: 22 out of 23 contested races.

Cobbled monuments

- Most Men's Tour of Flanders wins: 3 in 2020, 2022 and 2024 (record shared with 7 others).
- Most consecutive Men's Tour of Flanders podium finishes between 2020 and 2026: 7.
- Most consecutive Men's Paris-Roubaix wins between 2023 and 2025: 3 (record shared with Octave Lapize and Francesco Moser).
- Most consecutive Men's Cobbled Monuments wins between Paris-Roubaix 2023 and Paris-Roubaix 2025: 3 (record shared with Rik Van Looy, Tom Boonen and Fabian Cancellara).
- Most consecutive Men's Cobbled Monuments podium finishes between Tour of Flanders 2023 and Tour of Flanders 2026: 7.
- Most consecutive Men's Cobbled Monuments top 10 finishes between Tour of Flanders 2020 and Paris–Roubaix 2026: 13.
- Most consecutive years a Men's Cobbled Monument win between 2022 and 2025: 4.
- Most years Men's Cobbled Monuments podium finishes in 2021, 2023, 2024 and 2025: 4 (record shared with Eddy Merckx and Fabian Cancellara).
- Highest Men's Cobbled Monuments top 10 average ever: 14 out of 14 contested races.

Monuments

- First Men's Milan-San Remo and Men's Paris-Roubaix winner in multiple years in 2023 and 2025.
- Most years Men's Milan-San Remo, Men's Tour of Flanders and Men's Paris-Roubaix top 10 finishes between 2021 and 2026: 6.
- Most consecutive top 10 finishes in contested Men's Monuments: 22.
- Highest Men's Monuments top 10 average ever: 23 out of 24 contested races.

Championships

- First Men's Junior Cyclo-cross World Champion and Men's Junior Road Race World Champion in 2013.
- First Men's Cyclo-cross World Champion and Men's Road Race World Champion in 2023.
- First Men's Road Race World Champion and Men's Gravel World Champion in 2024.
- First Men's Gravel World Champion and Men's Cyclo-cross World Champion in 2024.
- First Men's World Champion in three different cycling disciplines in 2024 (cyclo-cross, road and gravel).
- First Men's medalist in the World Championships in four different cycling disciplines in 2023 (cyclo-cross, road, mountain bike and gravel).

Other

- Youngest Men's Ronde van Limburg winner ever in 2014 (19 years and 147 days).
- Most Men's Ronde van Limburg wins: 2 in 2014 and 2018 (record shared with 3 others).
- First Men's Milan-San Remo, Men's Paris-Roubaix winner and Men's Road Race World Champion in a single year in 2023.
- First Men's Milan-San Remo, Men's Tour of Flanders, Men's Paris-Roubaix podium finisher and Men's Road Race medalist in a single year in 2023.
- First Men's Tour of Flanders, Men's Paris-Roubaix, Men's Liège-Bastogne-Liège podium finisher and Men's Road Race medalist in a single year in 2024.
- First three Men's Monuments podium finisher and Men's Road Race medalist in consecutive years in 2023 and 2024.
- Least combined race days ever to win a stage and lead the General Classification in the Men's Tour de France and win a stage and lead the General Classification in the Men's Giro d'Italia in 2021 and 2022: 3.
- Longest solo win of the 21th century in a UCI .UWT, .Pro or .1 race in stage 5 of the 2026 Tour de Luxembourg: 175 km.

==== Continental records ====
- Youngest Men's Junior Cyclo-cross European Champion ever in 2011 (16 years and 290 days).
- First double Men's Junior Cyclo-cross European Champion in 2011 and 2012.
- First Men's Junior Cyclo-cross European Champion and Men's Elite Cyclo-cross European Champion in 2011, 2012 and 2017, 2018, 2019.
- First Men's Cyclo-cross World Champion and Men's Cyclo-cross European Champion in 2017.
- Most Men's Cyclo-cross European Championships titles: 3 (2017, 2018 and 2019).
- Most consecutive Men's Cyclo-cross European Championships medals between 2016 and 2019: 4 (record shared with Michael Vanthourenhout).
- First Men's Cyclo-cross European Champion and Men's Cross-country Mountain Bike European Champion in 2019.
- First Men's medalist in the Cyclo-cross European Championships, Road European Championships and Mountain Bike European Championships in 2019.

==== National records ====
- First Men's Novice Cyclo-cross Dutch Champion and Men's Novice Time Trial Dutch Champion in 2011.
- First Men's Junior Cyclo-cross Dutch Champion and Men's Junior Road Race Dutch Champion in 2013.
- Youngest Men's Cyclo-cross Dutch Champion ever in 2015 (19 years and 357 days).
- Most Dutch Men's Cyclo-cross Superprestige race wins: 32.
- Most Dutch Men's Cyclo-cross Trophy race wins: 34.
- Most Dutch Men's Cyclo-cross Superprestige wins: 4 in 2014-2015, 2016-2017, 2017-2018 and 2018-2019 (record shared with Hennie Stamsnijder).
- First Dutch Men's Cyclo-cross Trophy winner in 2017-2018 and 2018-2019.
- Most Dutch Men's UCI Cyclo-cross wins: 183.
- First Dutch Men's Strade Bianche winner in 2021.
- Most Dutch Men's stage wins in Tirreno-Adriatico: 5.
- Most Dutch Men's Milan-San Remo wins: 2 in 2023 and 2025.
- Most Dutch Men's E3 Saxo Bank Classic wins: 3 in 2024, 2025 and 2026 (record shared with Jan Raas).
- Most Dutch Men's Paris-Roubaix wins: 3 in 2023, 2024 and 2025.
- First Dutch Men's Tour of Flanders and Men's Paris-Roubaix winner in a single year in 2024.
- First Dutch Men's winner of the two Dutch World Tour races, the Amstel Gold Race and the Benelux Tour in 2019 and 2020.
- First Men's Cyclo-cross Dutch Champion, Men's Road Race Dutch Champion and Men's Cross-country Mountain Bike Dutch Champion in 2018.
- First Dutch Men's Gravel World Champion in 2024.
- Most Dutch Men's Monument wins: 8.
- Most Dutch Men's Cobbled classics wins: 9.
- Most Dutch Men's Word Tour Cobbled races wins: 12.
- Least Dutch Men's race days ever to win a stage and lead the General Classification in the Men's Tour de France in 2021: 2.
- Least Dutch Men's race days ever to win a stage and lead the General Classification in the Men's Giro d'Italia in 2022: 1 (record shared with Wim van Est and Tom Dumoulin).
- Most Dutch Men's UCI Road World Championships medals: 3 (record shared with Theo Middelkamp).

==== Family records ====
with David van der Poel

- First brothers to both win the Junior Dutch National Cyclo-cross Championships in 2010 and 2012, 2013.
- First brothers to both win the Junior UCI Cyclo-cross World Cup in 2009-2010 and 2011-2012, 2012-2013.
- First brothers to both win the Junior Cyclo-cross Superprestige in 2009-2010 and 2011-2012, 2012-2013.
- First brothers to both win the Under-23 Dutch National Cyclo-cross Championships in 2013 and 2014.

with Adri van der Poel

- First father and son to both win multiple Dutch National Cyclo-cross Championships in 1989, 1990, 1991, 1992, 1995, 1999 and 2015, 2016, 2017, 2018, 2019, 2020.
- First father and son to both win the Cyclo-cross World Championships in 1996 and 2015, 2019, 2020, 2021, 2023, 2024, 2025, 2026.
- First father and son to both win the Cyclo-cross World Cup in 1996-1997 and 2017-2018, 2025-2026.
- First father and son to both win the Cyclo-cross Superprestige in 1996-1997 and 2014-2015, 2016-2017, 2017-2018, 2018-2019.
- First father and son to both win the Tour of Flanders in 1986 and 2020, 2022, 2024.
- First father and son to both podium in Paris–Roubaix in 1986 and 2021, 2023, 2024, 2025.
- First father and son to both win the Brabantse Pijl in 1985 and 2019.
- First father and son to both win the Amstel Gold Race in 1990 and 2019.
- First father and son to both podium in Liège–Bastogne–Liège in 1986, 1988 and 2024.
- First father and son to both win the Dutch National Road Race Championships in 1987 and 2018, 2020.
- First father and son to both wear the yellow jersey in the Tour de France in 1984 and 2021, 2025.
- First father and son to both medal in the Road World Championships in 1983 and 2023, 2024.

with Raymond Poulidor

- First grandfather and grandson to both win Milan-San Remo in 1961 and 2023, 2025.
- First grandfather and grandson to both podium in Liège–Bastogne–Liège in 1968 and 2024.
- First grandfather and grandson to both win the National Road Race Championships in 1961 and 2018, 2020.
- First grandfather and grandson to both win a stage in the Tour de France in 1962, 1964, 1965, 1966, 1967, 1974 and 2021, 2025, 2026.
- First grandfather and grandson to both medal in the Road World Championships in 1961, 1964, 1966, 1974 and 2023, 2024.

=== Awards and honours ===
- Gerrie Knetemann Trophy - Dutch Young Cyclist of the Year: 2013.
- NOC*NSF Young Talent Award: 2013.
- Koning Winter - Best Cyclo-cross Rider of the Year: 2015, 2017, 2018, 2019.
- Flandrien of the Cyclo-cross: 2015, 2017, 2018.
- Dutch Mountain Biker of the Year: 2017, 2018, 2019, 2021.
- Gerrit Schulte Trophy - Dutch Cyclist of the Year: 2019, 2020, 2023, 2024.
- Jaap Eden Award - Dutch Sportsman of the Year: 2019, 2023.
- Eddy Merckx Trophy - Best Classics Rider of the Year: 2023.
- Vélo d'Or - 2nd place: 2023, 3rd place: 2024, 3rd place: 2025.
- International Flandrien of the Year: 2023.

A street in Berg en Terblijt (former Oeveregrubbe) is renamed to Mathieu van der Poel Allee on the place, a few kilometers from the finish, where he led the chase group to the front of the 2019 Amstel Gold Race.
