= Van Aert–Van der Poel rivalry =

Cycling rivalry between Wout van Aert and Mathieu van der Poel

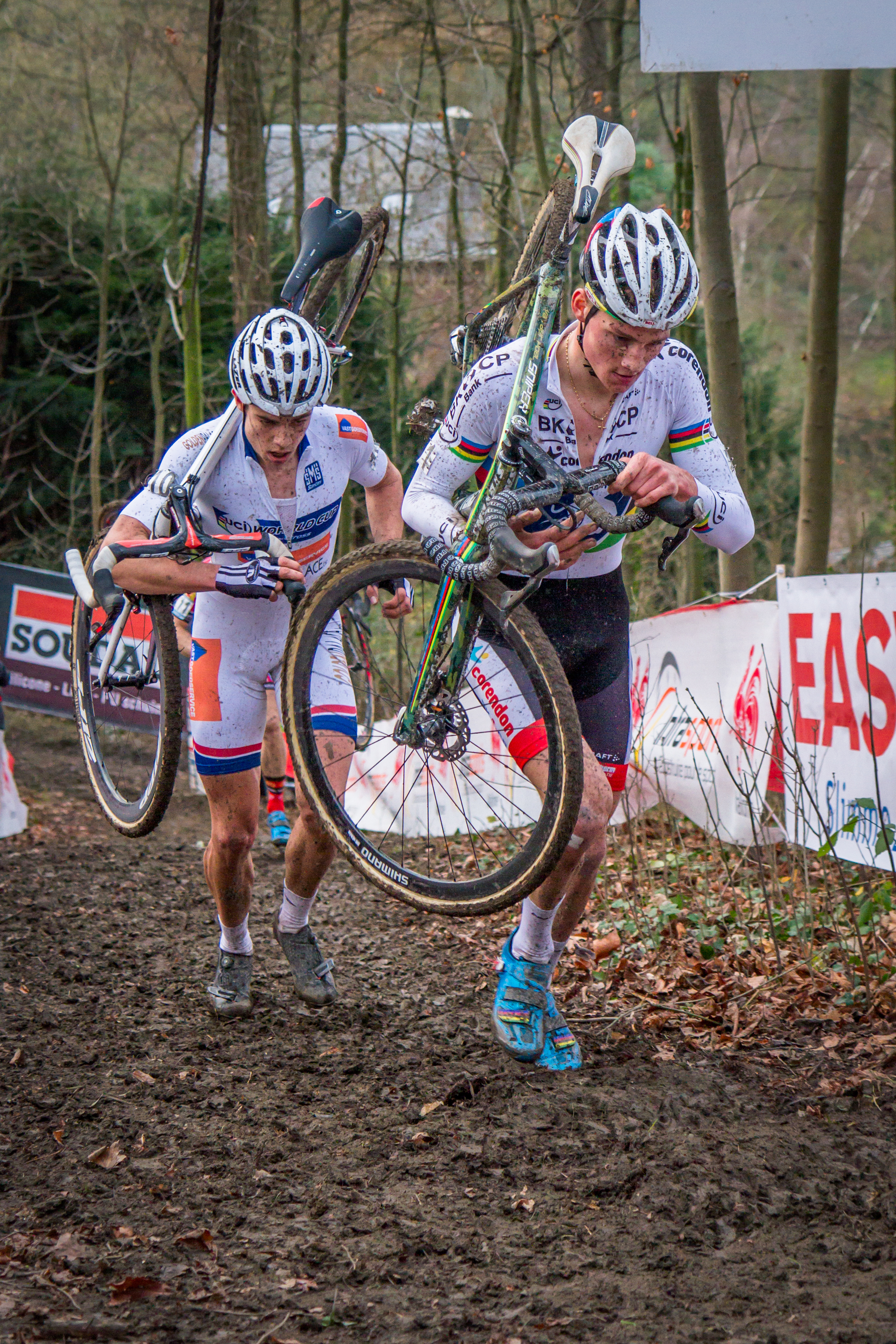
Van der Poel (right) in front of Van Aert at the UCI Cyclo-cross World Cup, Namur, 2015.

The cycling rivalry between Wout van Aert and Mathieu van der Poel is considered among the greatest and longest lasting rivalries in the sport, as they are contemporaries and have competed against each other since they were both eight years old. They raced each other for the first time in a major event in the 2012 UCI Cyclo-cross World Championships – Men's junior race and continuously since October 2013, originally in cyclo-cross and as their ambitions grew further also in road racing. The supporters of both riders, the Belgian media and later worldwide sports journalists began comparing one another regarding track record, racing style and personality.

Van Aert was born in September 1994 and Van der Poel in January 1995. Van Aert is from Belgium and has been riding for Team Visma–Lease a Bike since 2019. Van der Poel is from the Netherlands and rides for Alpecin–Deceuninck. Both were born and raised in the cycling heartland of Flanders and in both cyclo-cross and road racing they have won various similar races and achieved various similar milestones. In cyclo-cross, Van Aert has often been the better racer on heavy courses in the mud whereas Van der Poel is better on punchy courses and known for his last lap attacks. On the road, Van Aert has proved himself many times being the better time trialist, climber and mass sprinter whereas Van der Poel is the better puncheur and classics specialist.

== Background ==
Van der Poel grew up in a true cycling family, having an older brother, David van der Poel, who is also a professional cyclist. His father Adri is a six-time National Champion and became World Cyclocross Champion in 1996. He was also twice a stage winner at the Tour de France and a winner of several Classics during his career, such as the 1986 Tour of Flanders and the 1988 Liège–Bastogne–Liège. His grandfather is Raymond Poulidor, nicknamed The Eternal Second, winner of the 1961 Milan–San Remo, 1964 Vuelta a España and a five time runner up at the Tour de France. Van Aert grew up in a non-cycling family, although his father's cousin Jos van Aert was a Dutch professional cyclist who rode together in the Collstrop Cycling Team with Adri van der Poel in 1994.

== Quotes ==
- Van Aert in 2014 on the absence of Van der Poel in the U23 Cyclo-cross European Championships: "The absent are always in the wrong".”
- Van Aert in 2015 on his loss against Van der Poel in the Cyclo-cross World Championships: “I don't think I won silver. I lost gold. I think I can say that I was the best man in the race but that doesn't buy me anything." About Van der Poel: "He's a nice world champion. He'll show the jersey all year long.”
- Van Aert in 2016 after beating Van der Poel at the Cyclo-cross World Championships: “I have to thank him. Because I got stuck in his wheel I finally got into my rhythm. Merci Mathieu." As for the way Van der Poel wilted: "It's in my character never to give up. I don't race to sit up after five laps.“
- Van der Poel in 2017 on Niels Albert insisting Adri van der Poel designed the Cyclo-cross World Championships course in favour of Van der Poel: "When Wout became world champion in Hoogerheide on the course that my father had set, I didn't hear anyone! Always complaining. Wanker.”
- Adri van der Poel in 2018 on Van Aert dominating during the Cyclo-cross World Championships: “If the difference is two minutes, that is not normal. He rides around, but he does not breathe. With all due respect, Wout does not even stand in the shadow of Mathieu in terms of victories this season.”
- Van der Poel in 2020: “It's really important that I have someone pushing my limits, and I do the same with him as well – we make each other stronger. I think we’ve had some really good battles in the past, and it starts to be a story of its own, and you see that it's getting bigger than the sport itself. It's pretty cool to have someone like him, and it also benefits me.”
- Van Aert in 2021 on his loss against Van der Poel in the 2020 Tour of Flanders: “I would have preferred to have been beaten by Alaphilippe. I would have slept more easily that night. I keep turning that over for three nights, certainly because it was Mathieu who had won. We'll never change. This rivalry has made us who we are and it's not finished.”

== 'Big Three' ==
Throughout the years some riders were compared to Van Aert and Van der Poel, completing a so-called 'Big Three'. In cyclo-cross, Tom Pidcock, a multi-disciplined rider himself, was part of the Big Three since 2021. He never reached frequent wins in a cyclo-cross season and often ended on one of the lower podium spots. He became World Cyclo-cross Champion in 2022, though neither Van Aert nor Van der Poel competed in the race.

On the road, Van Aert and Van der Poel are often named in a Top Three in several lists of best classic racers. In 2020 and 2021 both Julian Alaphilippe, Van Aert and Van der Poel were at the top of their game as to the Classics. It would have come down to a three-horse battle in the final of the 2020 Tour of Flanders, if it weren't for the fall of Alaphilippe due to a motor cycle. In 2022 and 2023 the biggest contender of the 'Big Two' in Classics was Tadej Pogačar. He battled with Van der Poel in both the 2022 Tour of Flanders and 2023 Tour of Flanders and stood on the podium with Van Aert and Van der Poel in the 2023 UCI Road World Championships – Men's road race.

== Cyclo-cross ==
=== Cyclo-cross youth categories ===
Van Aert	2008-2009 Novices	2009-2010 Novices	2010-2011 Juniors	2011-2012 Juniors	2012-2013 U-23	2013-2014 U-23	2014-2015 U-23	Total
Number of wins	0	1	2	5	7	12	6	33

Van der Poel	2009-2010 Novices	2010-2011 Novices	2011-2012 Juniors	2012-2013 Juniors	2013-2014 U-23	2014-2015 U-23	Total
Number of wins	21	27	26	30	11	0	115

=== Novices ===
In the Novice ranks not many races were contested between the pair; 6 in 2009. Van der Poel had the better results in all cyclo-cross races they contested together. Van der Poel remained in the Novice ranks in the 2010-2011 season as Van Aert moved to the Junior ranks that cyclo-cross season.

==== Races contested together ====
Year and race	Best placed rider	Lower placed rider
2009 Horendonk	(Netherlands) Van der Poel	(Belgium) Van Aert 6th
2009 Erpe-Mere	(Netherlands) Van der Poel	(Belgium) Van Aert 6th
2009 Kessel	(Netherlands) Van der Poel	(Belgium) Van Aert 5th
2009 Zwijndrecht	(Netherlands) Van der Poel	(Belgium) Van Aert 5th
2009 Gavere	(Netherlands) Van der Poel	(Belgium) Van Aert 10th
2009 Koksijde	(Netherlands) Van der Poel	(Belgium) Van Aert 6th

=== Juniors ===
In the Junior category only in the 2011-2012 season Van Aert and Van der Poel raced together as Van Aert switched to the Under-23 ranks a year prior to Van der Poel. At the 2012 UCI Cyclo-cross World Championships – Men's junior race in Koksijde, it was Van der Poel who claimed his first world title, defeating Van Aert by eight seconds.

==== Races contested together ====
Year and race	Best placed rider	Lower placed rider
2011 Erpe-Mere	(Netherlands) Van der Poel	(Belgium) Van Aert 4th
2011 Kalmthout	(Netherlands) Van der Poel	(Belgium) Van Aert 4th
2011 Ruddervoorde	(Belgium) Van Aert	(Netherlands) Van der Poel
2011 Tábor	(Netherlands) Van der Poel	(Belgium) Van Aert 7th
2011 Hamme	(Netherlands) Van der Poel	(Belgium) Van Aert
2011 Gavere	(Netherlands) Van der Poel	(Belgium) Van Aert 4th
2011 Koksijde	(Netherlands) Van der Poel	(Belgium) Van Aert
2011 Gieten	(Netherlands) Van der Poel	(Belgium) Van Aert 4th
2011 Diegem	(Netherlands) Van der Poel	(Belgium) Van Aert
2011 Loenhout	(Netherlands) Van der Poel	(Belgium) Van Aert
2012 Liévin	(Netherlands) Van der Poel	(Belgium) Van Aert 20th
2012 Hoogerheide	(Netherlands) Van der Poel	(Belgium) Van Aert 5th
2012 Lille	(Netherlands) Van der Poel	(Belgium) Van Aert
2012 Hoogstraten	(Netherlands) Van der Poel	(Belgium) Van Aert
2012 Middelkerke	(Netherlands) Van der Poel	(Belgium) Van Aert
2012 Oostmalle	(Netherlands) Van der Poel	(Belgium) Van Aert

==== UCI Men's Junior Cyclo-cross World Championships ====
Year and category	Best placed rider	Lower placed rider
2012 Junior	(Netherlands) Van der Poel	(Belgium) Van Aert

==== UEC Men's Junior Cyclo-cross European Championships ====
Year and category	Best placed rider	Lower placed rider
2011 Junior	(Netherlands) Van der Poel	(Belgium) Van Aert 4th

=== Under-23 ===
In the Superprestige, the overall title went to Van der Poel with four wins to three.

==== Races contested together ====
Year and category	Best placed rider	Lower placed rider
2013 Ronse	(Netherlands) Van der Poel	(Belgium) Van Aert
2013 Cauberg	(Belgium) Van Aert	(Netherlands) Van der Poel
2013 Tábor	(Netherlands) Van der Poel	(Belgium) Van Aert
2013 Ruddervoorde	(Netherlands) Van der Poel	(Belgium) Van Aert 8th
2013 Koppenberg	(Belgium) Van Aert	(Netherlands) Van der Poel
2013 Hamme	(Netherlands) Van der Poel	(Belgium) Van Aert
2013 Hasselt	(Belgium) Van Aert	(Netherlands) Van der Poel
2013 Koksijde	(Netherlands) Van der Poel	(Belgium) Van Aert 15th
2013 Essen	(Belgium) Van Aert	(Netherlands) Van der Poel
2013 Namur	(Belgium) Van Aert	(Netherlands) Van der Poel
2013 Zolder	(Netherlands) Van der Poel	(Belgium) Van Aert
2013 Diegem	(Netherlands) Van der Poel	(Belgium) Van Aert
2014 Baal	(Belgium) Van Aert	(Netherlands) Van der Poel
2014 Rome	(Netherlands) Van der Poel	(Belgium) Van Aert
2014 Nommay	(Belgium) Van Aert	(Netherlands) Van der Poel
2014 Lille	(Belgium) Van Aert	(Netherlands) Van der Poel
2013 Oostmalle	(Belgium) Van Aert	(Netherlands) Van der Poel

==== UCI Men's Under-23 Cyclo-cross World Championships ====
Year and category	Best placed rider	Lower placed rider
2014 Under-23	(Belgium) Van Aert	(Netherlands) Van der Poel

==== UEC Men's Under-23 Cyclo-cross European Championships ====
Year and category	Best placed rider	Lower placed rider
2013 U-23	(Netherlands) Van der Poel	(Belgium) Van Aert 4th

=== Cyclo-cross elite category ===
Van Aert	2013-2014	2014-2015	2015-2016	2016-2017	2017-2018	2018-2019	2019-2020	2020-2021	2021-2022	2022-2023	2023-2024	2024-2025	2025-2026	Total
Number of wins	1	11	18	17	9	4	1	5	9	9	3	2	0	91

Van der Poel	2013-2014	2014-2015	2015-2016	2016-2017	2017-2018	2018-2019	2019-2020	2020-2021	2021-2022	2022-2023	2023-2024	2024-2025	2025-2026	Total
Number of wins	1	11	11	22	31	32	24	10	0	7	13	8	13	183

=== Cyclo-cross World Cup ===
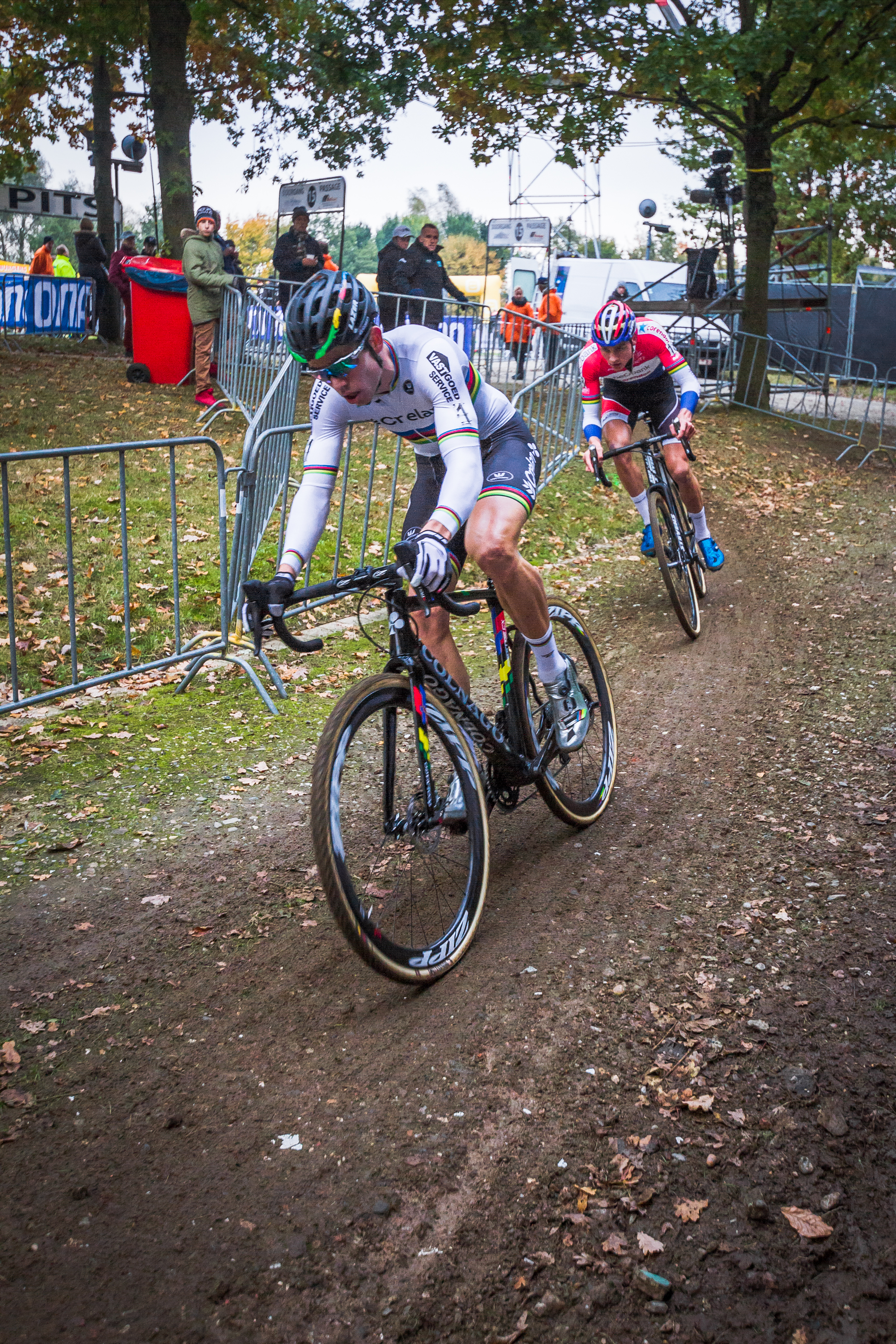
Wout van Aert (left) and Mathieu van der Poel (right) at the 2016 UCI Cyclocross World Cup. Valkenburg, Netherlands, 2016

Each of them won a round of the 2014–15 UCI Cyclo-cross World Cup. Van Aert rode a full 2015–16 UCI Cyclo-cross World Cup season, won the opening round in Las Vegas and secured the overall, while Van der Poel had a knee injury and had to skip the first two rounds. He did win the final four. The 2016–17 UCI Cyclo-cross World Cup was again dominated by Van Aert, as again Van der Poel missed the opening rounds due to an injury. Van Aert won four of the rounds and the overall, Van der Poel won three of them.

In the 2017–18 UCI Cyclo-cross World Cup Van der Poel won the overall as he finally rode a complete season. He won seven rounds, Van Aert beat him in the other two. In 2018–2019 Van der Poel won all six rounds he attended, Van Aert won one, but neither of them won the overall as Toon Aerts had a consistent World Cup season and finished top-4 in all rounds which got him enough points to beat the Big 2.

In the 2019–20 UCI Cyclo-cross World Cup Van Aert was not fully recovered from his 2019 Tour de France crash and did not win a round, as Van der Poel won all five of the rounds he contested. Again Toon Aerts secured the overall. The 2020-21 UCI Cyclo-cross World Cup season was shortened duo to the Covid pandemic. Van Aert rode all rounds as Van der Poel skipped the first one in Tabor. They both won two rounds, Van Aert won the overall for the third time. In 2021–2022 Van der Poel had a heavy back injury and did not win a round, Van Aert won two rounds. In the 2022–23 UCI Cyclo-cross World Cup Van Aert won again two rounds and Van der Poel five.

Van Aert	Total
World Cup wins	17
World Cup Overall series wins	3

Van der Poel	Total
World Cup wins	51
World Cup Overall series wins	2

Year and race	Best placed rider	Lower placed rider
2014 Koksijde	(Belgium) Van Aert	(Netherlands) Van der Poel
2015 Hoogerheide	(Netherlands) Van der Poel	(Belgium) Van Aert
2015 Koksijde	(Belgium) Van Aert	(Netherlands) Van der Poel
2015 Namur	(Netherlands) Van der Poel	(Belgium) Van Aert
2015 Zolder	(Netherlands) Van der Poel	(Belgium) Van Aert 8th
2016 Lignières	(Netherlands) Van der Poel	(Belgium) Van Aert
2016 Hoogerheide	(Netherlands) Van der Poel	(Belgium) Van Aert
2016 Valkenburg	(Netherlands) Van der Poel	(Belgium) Van Aert
2016 Zeven	(Netherlands) Van der Poel	(Belgium) Van Aert
2016 Namur	(Netherlands) Van der Poel	(Belgium) Van Aert
2016 Zolder	(Belgium) Van Aert	(Netherlands) Van der Poel 14th
2017 Las Vegas	(Netherlands) Van der Poel	(Belgium) Van Aert 14th
2017 Iowa	(Netherlands) Van der Poel	(Belgium) Van Aert 7th
2017 Koksijde	(Netherlands) Van der Poel	(Belgium) Van Aert
2017 Bogense	(Netherlands) Van der Poel	(Belgium) Van Aert
2017 Zeven	(Belgium) Van Aert	(Netherlands) Van der Poel
2017 Namur	(Belgium) Van Aert	(Netherlands) Van der Poel
2017 Zolder	(Netherlands) Van der Poel	(Belgium) Van Aert
2018 Nommay	(Netherlands) Van der Poel	(Belgium) Van Aert
2018 Hoogerheide	(Netherlands) Van der Poel	(Belgium) Van Aert
2018 Bern	(Netherlands) Van der Poel	(Belgium) Van Aert
2018 Tábor	(Netherlands) Van der Poel	(Belgium) Van Aert 7th
2018 Koksijde	(Netherlands) Van der Poel	(Belgium) Van Aert
2018 Namur	(Netherlands) Van der Poel	(Belgium) Van Aert
2018 Zolder	(Netherlands) Van der Poel	(Belgium) Van Aert
2019 Hoogerheide	(Netherlands) Van der Poel	(Belgium) Van Aert
2020 Hoogerheide	(Netherlands) Van der Poel	(Belgium) Van Aert 8th
2020 Namur	(Netherlands) Van der Poel	(Belgium) Van Aert
2020 Dendermonde	(Belgium) Van Aert	(Netherlands) Van der Poel
2021 Hulst	(Netherlands) Van der Poel	(Belgium) Van Aert
2021 Overijse	(Belgium) Van Aert	(Netherlands) Van der Poel
2021 Dendermonde	(Belgium) Van Aert	(Netherlands) Van der Poel
2022 Antwerpen	(Netherlands) Van der Poel	(Belgium) Van Aert
2022 Gavere	(Netherlands) Van der Poel	(Belgium) Van Aert
2022 Zonhoven	(Belgium) Van Aert	(Netherlands) Van der Poel
2023 Benidorm	(Netherlands) Van der Poel	(Belgium) Van Aert
2023 Hoogerheide	(Netherlands) Van der Poel	(Belgium) Van Aert
2023 Antwerpen	(Netherlands) Van der Poel	(Belgium) Van Aert
2023 Gavere	(Netherlands) Van der Poel	(Belgium) Van Aert
2023 Hulst	(Netherlands) Van der Poel	(Belgium) Van Aert 5th
2024 Benidorm	(Belgium) Van Aert	(Netherlands) Van der Poel 5th
2025 Maasmechelen	(Netherlands) Van der Poel	(Belgium) Van Aert
2025 Antwerpen	(Netherlands) Van der Poel	(Belgium) Van Aert 7th

=== Cyclo-cross Superprestige ===
Van Aert	Total
Superprestige wins	14
Superprestige Overall series wins	1

Van der Poel	Total
Superprestige wins	32
Superprestige Overall series wins	4

Year and race	Best placed rider	Lower placed rider
2015 Hoogstraten	(Netherlands) Van der Poel	(Belgium) Van Aert
2015 Middelkerke	(Netherlands) Van der Poel	(Belgium) Van Aert
2015 Spa	(Belgium) Van Aert	(Netherlands) Van der Poel 12th
2015 Diegem	(Netherlands) Van der Poel	(Belgium) Van Aert 10th
2016 Hoogstraten	(Netherlands) Van der Poel	(Belgium) Van Aert
2016 Middelkerke	(Netherlands) Van der Poel	(Belgium) Van Aert
2016 Gieten	(Netherlands) Van der Poel	(Belgium) Van Aert
2016 Zonhoven	(Netherlands) Van der Poel	(Belgium) Van Aert
2016 Ruddervoorde	(Netherlands) Van der Poel	(Belgium) Van Aert
2016 Gavere	(Netherlands) Van der Poel	(Belgium) Van Aert
2016 Spa	(Belgium) Van Aert	(Netherlands) Van der Poel
2016 Diegem	(Netherlands) Van der Poel	(Belgium) Van Aert
2017 Hoogstraten	(Netherlands) Van der Poel	(Belgium) Van Aert
2017 Middelkerke	(Netherlands) Van der Poel	(Belgium) Van Aert
2017 Gieten	(Netherlands) Van der Poel	(Belgium) Van Aert
2017 Zonhoven	(Netherlands) Van der Poel	(Belgium) Van Aert
2017 Boom	(Belgium) Van Aert	(Netherlands) Van der Poel 4th
2017 Ruddervoorde	(Netherlands) Van der Poel	(Belgium) Van Aert
2017 Gavere	(Belgium) Van Aert	(Netherlands) Van der Poel
2017 Diegem	(Netherlands) Van der Poel	(Belgium) Van Aert
2018 Hoogstraten	(Netherlands) Van der Poel	(Belgium) Van Aert 6th
2018 Gieten	(Netherlands) Van der Poel	(Belgium) Van Aert
2018 Ruddervoorde	(Netherlands) Van der Poel	(Belgium) Van Aert
2018 Gavere	(Netherlands) Van der Poel	(Belgium) Van Aert
2018 Zonhoven	(Netherlands) Van der Poel	(Belgium) Van Aert
2018 Diegem	(Netherlands) Van der Poel	(Belgium) Van Aert 5th
2020 Zolder	(Netherlands) Van der Poel	(Belgium) Van Aert
2021 Zolder	(Belgium) Van Aert	(Netherlands) Van der Poel DNF
2022 Zolder	(Belgium) Van Aert	(Netherlands) Van der Poel
2022 Diegem	(Belgium) Van Aert	(Netherlands) Van der Poel

=== Cyclo-cross Trofee ===
Van Aert raced a full Elite Trofee series in 2014-2015 and won it. Van der Poel did not contest a complete series.

Van Aert	Total
Trofee wins	22
Trofee Overall series wins	3

Van der Poel	Total
Trofee wins	34
Trofee Overall series wins	2

Year and race	Best placed rider	Lower placed rider
2014 Ronse	(Netherlands) Van der Poel	(Belgium) Van Aert 7th
2014 Hamme	(Belgium) Van Aert	(Netherlands) Van der Poel
2014 Loenhout	(Belgium) Van Aert	(Netherlands) Van der Poel
2015 Lille	(Netherlands) Van der Poel	(Belgium) Van Aert
2015 Hamme	(Belgium) Van Aert	(Netherlands) Van der Poel 5th
2015 Essen	(Belgium) Van Aert	(Netherlands) Van der Poel 8th
2015 Antwerpen	(Belgium) Van Aert	(Netherlands) Van der Poel
2015 Loenhout	(Belgium) Van Aert	(Netherlands) Van der Poel 7th
2016 Sint-Niklaas	(Belgium) Van Aert	(Netherlands) Van der Poel 22nd
2016 Ronse	(Belgium) Van Aert	(Netherlands) Van der Poel 4th
2016 Koppenberg	(Belgium) Van Aert	(Netherlands) Van der Poel 15th
2016 Hamme	(Netherlands) Van der Poel	(Belgium) Van Aert
2016 Essen	(Belgium) Van Aert	(Netherlands) Van der Poel 16th
2016 Antwerpen	(Netherlands) Van der Poel	(Belgium) Van Aert
2016 Loenhout	(Belgium) Van Aert	(Netherlands) Van der Poel DNF
2017 Lille	(Netherlands) Van der Poel	(Belgium) Van Aert
2017 Ronse	(Netherlands) Van der Poel	(Belgium) Van Aert
2017 Koppenberg	(Netherlands) Van der Poel	(Belgium) Van Aert 4th
2017 Hamme	(Netherlands) Van der Poel	(Belgium) Van Aert 16th
2017 Antwerpen	(Netherlands) Van der Poel	(Belgium) Van Aert
2017 Loenhout	(Netherlands) Van der Poel	(Belgium) Van Aert
2018 Baal	(Netherlands) Van der Poel	(Belgium) Van Aert
2018 Lille	(Netherlands) Van der Poel	(Belgium) Van Aert 8th
2018 Koppenberg	(Belgium) Van Aert	(Netherlands) Van der Poel 21st
2018 Antwerpen	(Netherlands) Van der Poel	(Belgium) Van Aert
2018 Loenhout	(Netherlands) Van der Poel	(Belgium) Van Aert
2019 Loenhout	(Netherlands) Van der Poel	(Belgium) Van Aert 5th
2020 Herentals	(Belgium) Van Aert	(Netherlands) Van der Poel
2021 Baal	(Netherlands) Van der Poel	(Belgium) Van Aert
2021 Hamme	(Netherlands) Van der Poel	(Belgium) Van Aert
2022 Herentals	(Netherlands) Van der Poel	(Belgium) Van Aert
2022 Koksijde	(Belgium) Van Aert	(Netherlands) Van der Poel
2024 Baal	(Netherlands) Van der Poel	(Belgium) Van Aert
2024 Koksijde	(Netherlands) Van der Poel	(Belgium) Van Aert
2025 Hofstade	(Netherlands) Van der Poel	(Belgium) Van Aert
2025 Loenhout	(Netherlands) Van der Poel	(Belgium) Van Aert 10th

=== Other races ===
Van Aert	Total
Other wins	38 (including 3 World Championships titles and 5 Belgian Championships titles)

Van der Poel	Total
Other wins	66 (including 8 World Championships titles, 3 European Championships titles and 6 Dutch Championships titles)

Year and race	Best placed rider	Lower placed rider
2014 Mol	(Belgium) Van Aert	(Netherlands) Van der Poel 4th
2015 Waregem	(Netherlands) Van der Poel	(Belgium) Van Aert
2015 Eeklo	(Belgium) Van Aert	(Netherlands) Van der Poel 5th
2015 Mol	(Belgium) Van Aert	(Netherlands) Van der Poel
2016 Meulebeke	(Netherlands) Van der Poel	(Belgium) Van Aert 9th
2016 Boom	(Belgium) Van Aert	(Netherlands) Van der Poel
2016 Mol	(Netherlands) Van der Poel	(Belgium) Van Aert
2016 Overijse	(Netherlands) Van der Poel	(Belgium) Van Aert
2017 Otegem	(Netherlands) Van der Poel	(Belgium) Van Aert 5th
2017 Maldegem	(Netherlands) Van der Poel	(Belgium) Van Aert 4th
2017 Hulst	(Netherlands) Van der Poel	(Belgium) Van Aert
2017 Waregem	(Belgium) Van Aert	(Netherlands) Van der Poel
2017 Leuven	(Netherlands) Van der Poel	(Belgium) Van Aert 10th
2017 Eeklo	(Netherlands) Van der Poel	(Belgium) Van Aert
2017 Meulebeke	(Netherlands) Van der Poel	(Belgium) Van Aert
2017 Kruibeke	(Netherlands) Van der Poel	(Belgium) Van Aert
2017 Bredene	(Belgium) Van Aert	(Netherlands) Van der Poel
2018 Otegem	(Netherlands) Van der Poel	(Belgium) Van Aert
2018 Meulebeke	(Netherlands) Van der Poel	(Belgium) Van Aert
2018 Wachtebeke	(Netherlands) Van der Poel	(Belgium) Van Aert
2019 Otegem	(Netherlands) Van der Poel	(Belgium) Van Aert
2020 Zonnebeke	(Netherlands) Van der Poel	(Belgium) Van Aert
2022 Mol	(Belgium) Van Aert	(Netherlands) Van der Poel
2022 Loenhout	(Belgium) Van Aert	(Netherlands) Van der Poel
2023 Mol	(Netherlands) Van der Poel	(Belgium) Van Aert
2024 Loenhout	(Netherlands) Van der Poel	(Belgium) Van Aert 4th
2026 Mol	(Netherlands) Van der Poel	(Belgium) Van Aert DNF

=== UCI Men's Elite Cyclo-cross World Championships ===
The 2023 UCI Cyclo-cross World Championships in Hoogerheide was decided in the last lap. Van der Poel outsmarted Van Aert by not sprinting after the barriers, but focussing on the final sprint. He made the first kick in the straight uphill and won in his backyard.

In all UCI Cyclo-cross World Championships – Men's elite races they both contested, one of them won the race.

Year and category	Best placed rider	Lower placed rider
2015	(Netherlands) Van der Poel	(Belgium) Van Aert
2016	(Belgium) Van Aert	(Netherlands) Van der Poel 5th
2017	(Belgium) Van Aert	(Netherlands) Van der Poel
2018	(Belgium) Van Aert	(Netherlands) Van der Poel
2019	(Netherlands) Van der Poel	(Belgium) Van Aert
2020	(Netherlands) Van der Poel	(Belgium) Van Aert 4th
2021	(Netherlands) Van der Poel	(Belgium) Van Aert
2023	(Netherlands) Van der Poel	(Belgium) Van Aert
2025	(Netherlands) Van der Poel	(Belgium) Van Aert

=== UEC Men's Elite Cyclo-cross European Championships ===
Year and category	Best placed rider	Lower placed rider
2016	(Netherlands) Van der Poel	(Belgium) Van Aert
2018	(Netherlands) Van der Poel	(Belgium) Van Aert

== Road ==
In the 2021 road race Van Aert was the leader of the Belgian team on home soil in Leuven while Remco Evenepoel worked in the leading group. He could not finish the job however and finished eleventh. Van der Poel did not have an ideal preparation after his Tokyo crash during the Cross-country cycling Olympics. He finished eight. In 2022 Van Aert had to sit back in the main peloton and took fourth place in the bunch sprint while Evenepoel soloed to victory in the leading group. Van der Poel had been in prison the night before the race after a hotel incident with some teenage girls and gave up early.

Before the 2023 race they both were the favourites because the course suited them and they both had a smooth preparation. In a war of attrition it was Van der Poel who rode away from the leaders including Van Aert and soloed to victory as Van Aert took the silver medal.

=== UCI Men's Elite Road Race World Championships ===
Year and category	Best placed rider	Lower placed rider
2021	(Netherlands) Van der Poel 8th	(Belgium) Van Aert 11th
2022	(Belgium) Van Aert 4th	(Netherlands) Van der Poel DNF
2023	(Netherlands) Van der Poel	(Belgium) Van Aert

The 2018 European Road Championships in Glasgow were the first major international head-to-head battle between the pair. On a technical course Matteo Trentin won the sprint against silver medalist Van der Poel and bronze medalist Van Aert.

=== UEC Men's Elite Road Race European Championships ===
Year and category	Best placed rider	Lower placed rider
2018	(Netherlands) Van der Poel	(Belgium) Van Aert

=== Monuments ===
Milan-San Remo

Both Van Aert and Van der Poel have won the Monument Milan-San Remo. Van Aert was the first of them to do so in 2020. It remained his only Monument win until Paris-Roubaix in 2026. Three years later Van der Poel won the Primavera as well, winning again in 2025. Van Aert stood on the third spot of the podium three times, Van der Poel once.

Milan-San Remo	2019	2020	2021	2022	2023	2024	2025	2026
Van Aert	6	1	3	8	3	—	—	3
Van der Poel	—	13	5	3	1	10	1	8

Tour of Flanders

Only Van der Poel has managed to win the Tour of Flanders, which he achieved on three occasions, as well as finishing second twice and third once. Van der Poel has had remarkable consistency in the race finishing on the podium in six consecutive editions and never lower than fourth in his entire career. Van Aert has not won the Tour of Flanders, his best placement was second, after losing a sprint against Van der Poel in 2020.

Tour of Flanders	2018	2019	2020	2021	2022	2023	2024	2025	2026
Van Aert	9	14	2	6	—	4	—	4	4
Van der Poel	—	4	1	2	1	2	1	3	2

Paris-Roubaix

Van Aert has rode in seven editions of Paris-Roubaix. Prior to winning the 2026 edition, his best results were a second place in 2022 and a third place in 2023, the last one after suffering a flat tire on the Carrefour de l'Arbre. Van der Poel won that edition beginning a string of three wins with additional victories in 2024 and 2025. He also secured third place in 2021.

Paris-Roubaix	2018	2019	2020	2021	2022	2023	2024	2025	2026
Van Aert	13	22	NH	7	2	3	—	4	1
Van der Poel	—	—	NH	3	9	1	1	1	4

Liège-Bastogne-Liège

Van der Poel rode Liège-Bastogne-Liège in the pandemic season 2020 after he won the 2020 BinckBank Tour queen stage and general classification the day before. He finished in sixth place at his first attempt. In 2024 he finished on the podium for the first time, sprinting to third place. Van Aert rode Liège once, in 2022, after having to miss the 2022 Tour of Flanders due to a Covid infection. He finished on the podium in third in his only attempt.

Liège-Bastogne-Liège	2020	2021	2022	2024
Van Aert	—	—	3	—
Van der Poel	6	—	—	3

Giro di Lombardia

Only Van der Poel has ridden Il Lombardia, in the pandemic season 2020. He suffered on the long and steep Muro di Sormano and ended in tenth place. After this Top Ten place he also secured a sixth place in Liége, a 5th place in 2021 Milan-San Remo, a first and a second place in the Tour of Flanders and a third place at the 2021 Paris-Roubaix in 14 months, being the second fastest to Top Ten in all 5 Monuments. Only Eddy Merckx reached this milestone sooner, in 13 months.

Giro di Lombardia	2020
Van Aert	—
Van der Poel	10

==== Road races both won ====
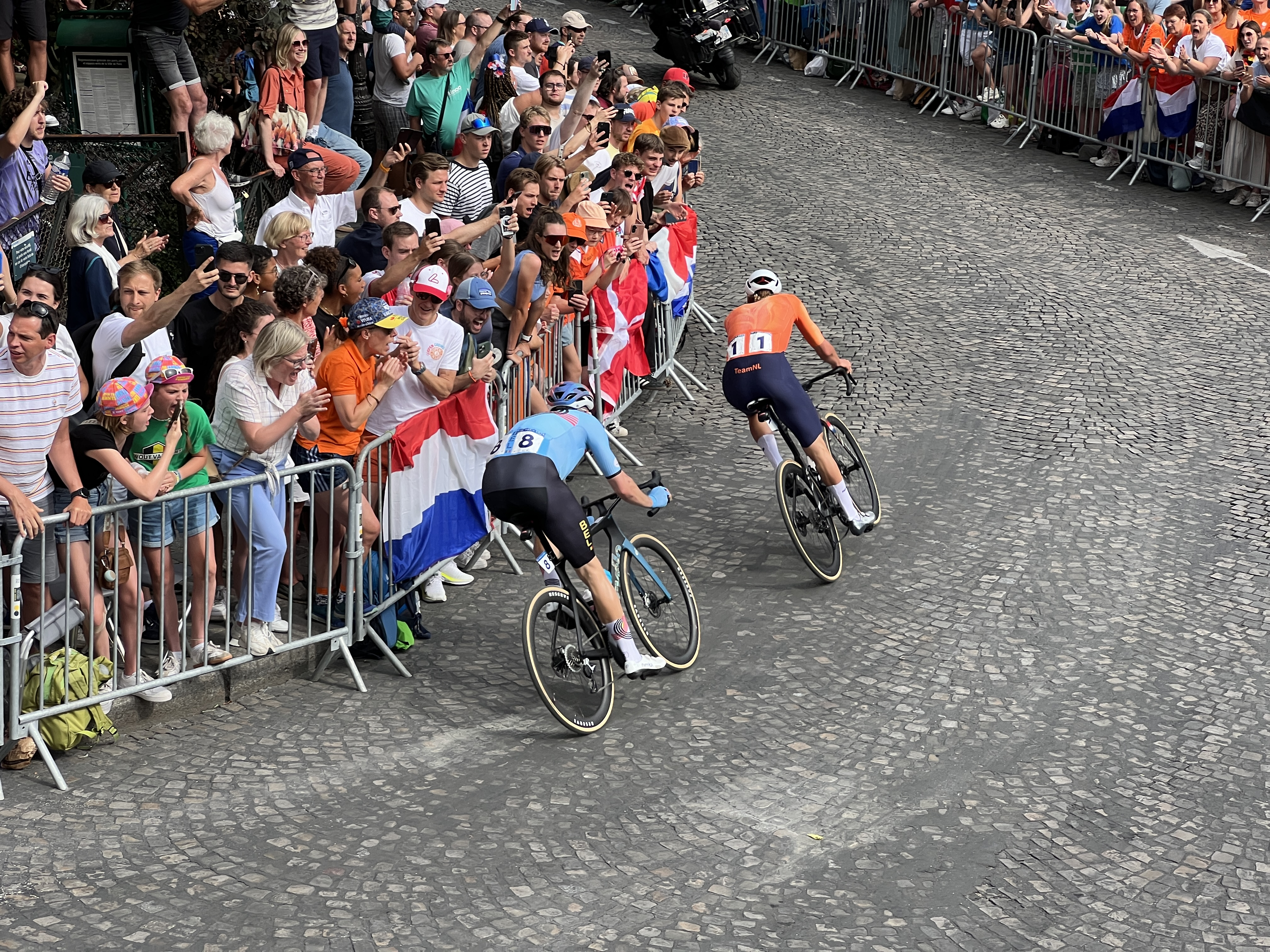
Van der Poel and Van Aert at the 2024 2024 Olympic Road Race in Paris

Both Van Aert and Van der Poel won some of the major classics, including cycling Monument Milan-San Remo, the Strade Bianche and the Amstel Gold Race. The only stage race they both were victorious is the Tour of Britain and they both won one stage (Van der Poel) or multiple stages (Van Aert even won 9) in the Tour de France.

Year and winner	Race	Both in race
(Belgium) 2020 Van Aert	(Italy) Strade Bianche	Yes
(Netherlands) 2021 Van der Poel	(Italy) Strade Bianche	Yes
(Netherlands) 2020, 2021 Van der Poel	(Italy) Tirreno-Adriatico stages (3)	In 2021
(Belgium) 2021 Van Aert	(Italy) Tirreno-Adriatico stages (2)	Yes
(Belgium) 2020 Milan-San Remo Van Aert	(Italy) Milan-San Remo	Yes
(Netherlands) 2023 Van der Poel	(Italy) Milan-San Remo	Yes
(Netherlands) 2019 Van der Poel	(Netherlands) Amstel Gold Race	Yes
(Belgium) 2021 Van Aert	(Netherlands) Amstel Gold Race	No
(Belgium) 2016 Van Aert	Tour of Belgium stage	No
(Netherlands) 2017, 2023 Van der Poel	Tour of Belgium stages (2)	In 2017
(Netherlands) 2014, 2018 Van der Poel	(Belgium) Ronde van Limburg	In 2014
(Belgium) 2017 Van Aert	(Belgium) Ronde van Limburg	Yes
(Netherlands) 2018, 2020 Van der Poel	(Netherlands) National Road Race Championships	No
(Belgium) 2021 Van Aert	(Belgium) National Road Race Championships	No
(Belgium) 2019, 2020, 2021, 2022 Van Aert	Tour de France stages (9)	In 2022
(Netherlands) 2021 Van der Poel	Tour de France stage	Yes
(Netherlands) 2019 Van der Poel	(United Kingdom) Tour of Britain	No
(Belgium) 2021, 2023 Van Aert	(United Kingdom) Tour of Britain	No
