= Florian Vermeersch =

Belgian cyclist

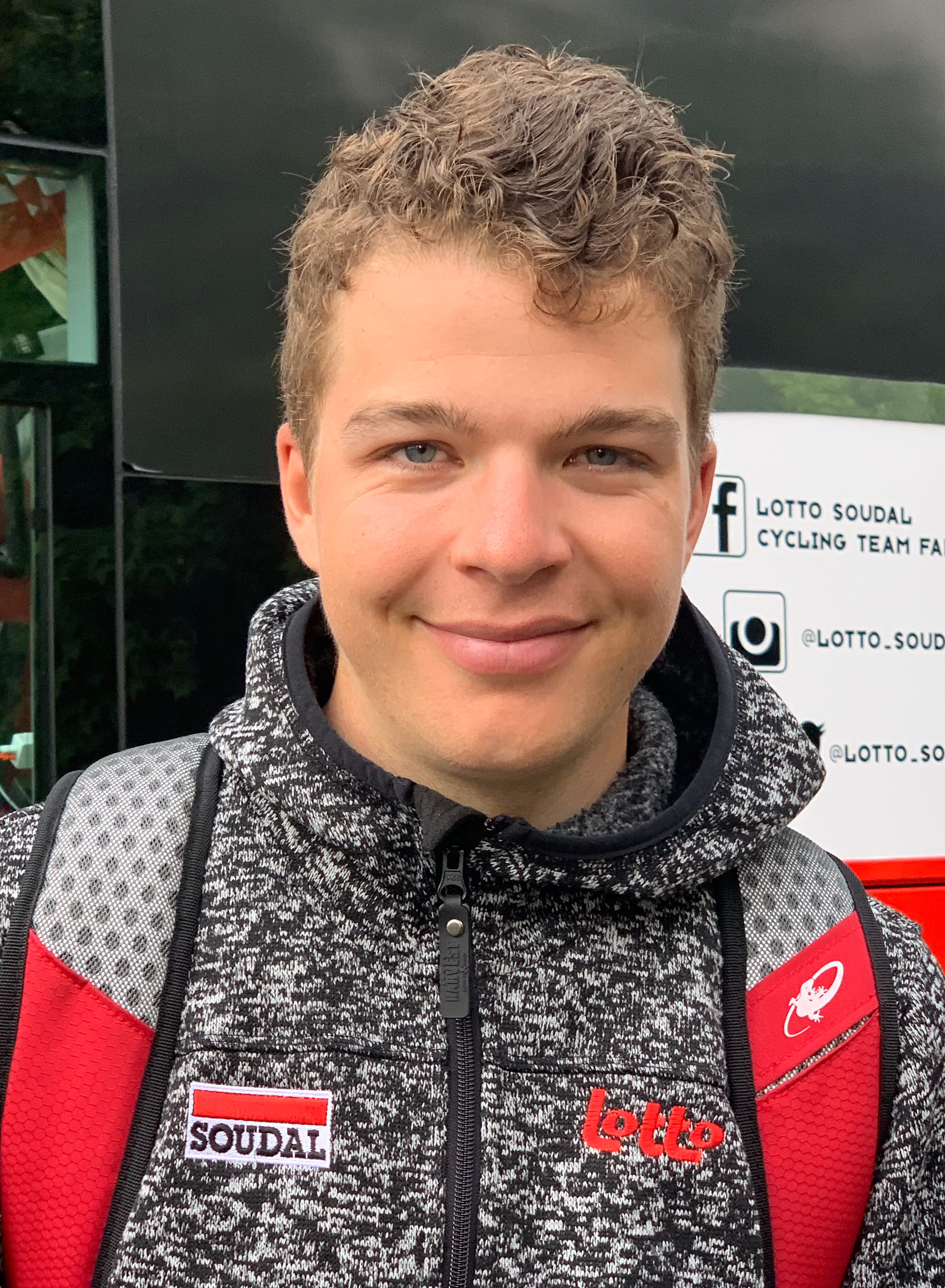
- Vermeersch in 2021

Personal information
- Nickname: The Mayor
- Born: 12 March 1999 (age 27) Ghent, Belgium
- Height: 1.93 m (6 ft 4 in)
- Weight: 85 kg (187 lb; 13 st 5 lb)

Cycling career
- Sport: Cycling
- Current team: UAE Team Emirates XRG
- Disciplines: Road; Cyclo-cross
- Role: Rider
- Rider type: Classics specialist

Amateur team
- 2019–2020: Lotto–Soudal U23

Professional teams
- 2020–2024: Lotto–Soudal
- 2025–: UAE Team Emirates XRG

Major wins
- Gravel World Championships (2025)
Medal record
Representing Belgium
Men's road bicycle racing
World Championships
Bronze medal – third place	2021 Brugge	Under-23 time trial
Men's gravel cycling
World Championships
Gold medal – first place	2025 South Limburg	Elite
Silver medal – second place	2023 Veneto	Elite
Silver medal – second place	2024 Flanders	Elite
Silver medal – second place	2026 Nannup	Elite

Florian Vermeersch (born 12 March 1999) is a Belgian professional racing cyclist, who currently rides for UCI WorldTeam UAE Team Emirates XRG.

== Career ==
=== Lotto–Soudal (2020–2024) ===
On 1 June 2020, Vermeersch was promoted from the team's under-23 development squad. Formerly, Vermeersch competed in cyclo-cross, in which he was highly successful. While being a professional cyclist, he is studying history at Ghent University. In 2021, he placed third in the UCI Road World Under–23 men's time trial. At the 2021 Paris–Roubaix race, which had been postponed from April due to the COVID-19 pandemic, he got into the early breakaway of around 30 riders and ultimately finished second to Sonny Colbrelli and ahead of Mathieu van der Poel in a three-man sprint in the velodrome.

Vermeersch sustained a broken femur in a crash during his first race of 2024 at the Vuelta a Murcia on February 10. The accident occurred on the descent of Alto Collado Bermejo, and forced him to miss the Spring Classics.

=== UAE Team Emirates XRG (2025–) ===
On April 24, it was announced that Vermeersch is set to join UAE Team Emirates on a multi-year contract beginning from the 2025 season. The official signing is pending due to UCI transfer regulations.

== Major results ==
=== Cyclo-cross ===
2015–2016
1st Junior Eeklo
Junior Bpost Bank Trophy

1st Hamme
2nd Sint-Niklaas

Junior Superprestige

2nd Hoogstraten
2nd Middelkerke

2016–2017
Junior DVV Trophy

1st Lille

1st Junior Mol
Junior Brico Cross

2nd Meulebeke

3rd Junior Boom

=== Gravel ===
2023
1st Serenissima Gravel
2nd UCI World Championships
2024
2nd UCI World Championships
2025
1st UCI World Championships

=== Road ===
2019
1st Road race, National Under-23 Championships
6th Gylne Gutuer
7th Overall À travers les Hauts-de-France
7th Hafjell TT
10th Lillehammer GP
2020
4th Brussels Cycling Classic
5th Time trial, National Championships
8th Giro della Toscana
9th Overall BinckBank Tour
2021
1st Mountains classification, Tour de Wallonie
2nd Paris–Roubaix
3rd Time trial, UCI World Under-23 Championships
5th Time trial, National Championships
8th Circuit de Wallonie
2022 (1 pro win)
1st Antwerp Port Epic
9th Grand Prix du Morbihan
2023
2nd Overall Renewi Tour
2nd Boucles de l'Aulne
3rd Dwars door het Hageland
3rd Giro del Veneto
3rd Super 8 Classic
4th Ronde van Drenthe
4th Antwerp Port Epic
5th Overall Danmark Rundt
7th Overall Tour of Belgium
7th Veneto Classic
8th Tro-Bro Léon
2025
National Championships

2nd Time trial
5th Road race

2nd Veneto Classic
4th Grand Prix de Denain
5th Paris–Roubaix
6th Overall Tour of Belgium
6th Bredene Koksijde Classic
2026
3rd Omloop Het Nieuwsblad
3rd E3 Saxo Classic
3rd Flandrien 0.0 Classic
7th Tour of Flanders
8th Overall Tour of Britain

==== Grand Tour general classification results timeline ====
Grand Tour	2021	2022	2023
Giro d'Italia	—	—	—
Tour de France	—	108	120
Vuelta a España	121	—	—

==== Classics results timeline ====
Monument	2020	2021	2022	2023	2024	2025	2026
Milan–San Remo	—	—	125	—	—	—	131
Tour of Flanders	DNF	DNF	76	12	—	43	7
Paris–Roubaix	—	2	DNF	12	—	5	
Liège–Bastogne–Liège	—	—	—	—	—	—	—
Giro di Lombardia	—	—	—	—	—	—	—
Classic	2020	2021	2022	2023	2024	2025	2026
Omloop Het Nieuwsblad	—	DNF	61	43	—	142	3
Kuurne–Brussels–Kuurne	—	DNF	—	32	—	61	54
E3 Saxo Classic	—	16	—	DNF	—	24	3
Gent–Wevelgem	13	DNF	19	17	—	23	31

Legend
—	Did not compete
DNF	Did not finish
