= Chiara Teocchi =

Italian cross-country mountain biker

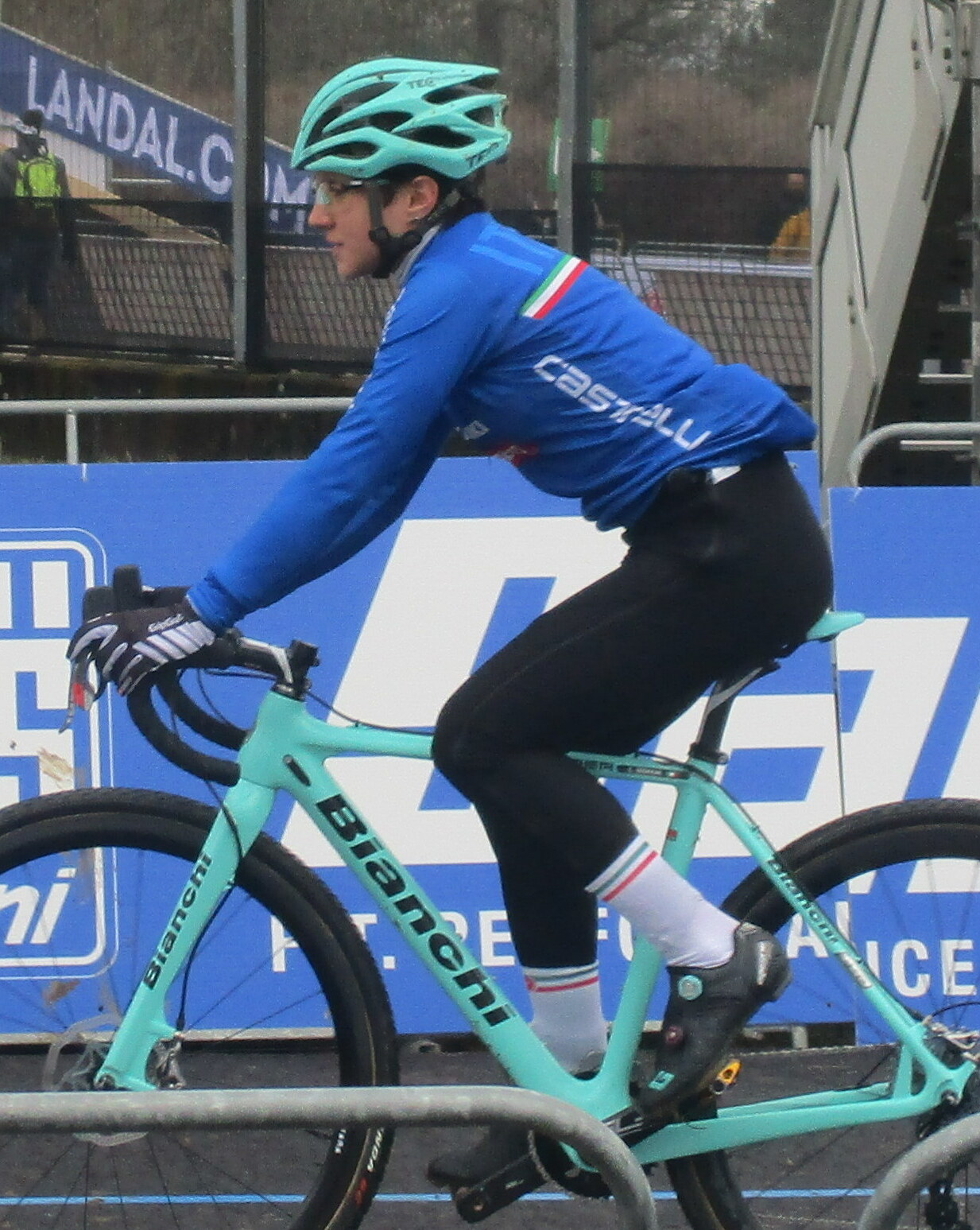
- Teocchi in 2018

Personal information
- Born: 8 December 1996 (age 29) Bergamo, Italy

Cycling career
- Sport: Cycling
- Current team: BH Coloma Team
- Disciplines: Cyclo-cross; Mountain bike racing; Gravel
- Role: Rider
- Rider type: Cross-country (MTB)

Professional teams
- 2015–2019: Bianchi Countervail
- 2020: Stanta Cruz FSA MTB Pro Team
- 2021–2022: Trinity Racing
- 2023: KTM Protek Elettrosystem
- 2024–: Orbea Factory Team
Medal record
Representing Italy
Women's gravel bicycle racing
World Championships
Bronze medal – third place	2022 Veneto	Elite
Women's mountain bike racing
European Championships
Gold medal – first place	2018 Graz-Stattegg	Mixed relay
Gold medal – first place	2024 Cheile Grădiștei	Mixed relay
Bronze medal – third place	2015 Chies d'Alpago	Cross-country eliminator
Bronze medal – third place	2017 Darfo Boario Terme	Mixed relay
Women's cyclo-cross
European Championships
Gold medal – first place	2016 Pontchâteau	Under-23
Gold medal – first place	2017 Tábor	Under-23

Chiara Teocchi (born 8 December 1996) is an Italian racing cyclist, who competes in the cyclo-cross, cross-country mountain biking and gravel disciplines. She competed in the women's cross-country event at the 2024 Summer Olympics, placing 11th. She is also a two-time European under-23 cyclo-cross champion. In 2022, she won the bronze medal at the inaugural UCI Gravel World Championships.

== Major results ==
=== Cyclo-cross ===
2014–2015
Giro d'Italia Cross

1st Isola d'Elba
1st Padova
2nd Fiuggi
3rd Rome

2nd Milan
3rd National Championships
2015–2016
Giro d'Italia Cross

1st Portoferraio
1st Montalto di Castro
2nd Fiuggi
2nd Asolo
3rd Rome

1st Ciclocross del Ponte
1st Brugherio
2nd National Under-23 Championships
2016–2017
1st European Under-23 Championships
1st National Under-23 Championships
1st Gorizia
1st Brugherio
2nd Ciclocross del Ponte
3rd Milan
2017–2018
1st European Under-23 Championships
1st National Under-23 Championships
2nd Gorizia
2018–2019
3rd National Championships
2020–2021
2nd National Championships

=== Mountain bike ===
2014
National Championships

1st Cross-country eliminator
1st Junior cross-country

2015
3rd Cross-country eliminator, European Championships
2016
1st Cross-country, National Under-23 Championships
UCI Under-23 XCO World Cup

3rd Mont-Sainte-Anne

2017
1st Cross-country, National Under-23 Championships
3rd Mixed relay, European Championships
2018
1st Mixed relay, European Championships
2024
1st Mixed relay, European Championships

=== Gravel ===
2022
3rd UCI World Championships

=== Road ===
2014
Summer Youth Olympics

1st Girls' team
2nd Mixed team relay
