= 2025 Paris–Roubaix =

Cycling race

2025 UCI World Tour, race 16 of 36
- Official event poster

Race details
- Dates: 13 April 2025
- Stages: 1
- Distance: 259.2 km (161.1 mi)

Results
	Winner	Mathieu van der Poel (NED)	(Alpecin–Deceuninck)
	Second	Tadej Pogačar (SLO)	(UAE Team Emirates XRG)
	Third	Mads Pedersen (DEN)	(Lidl–Trek)

The 2025 Paris–Roubaix was a road cycling one-day race that took place on 13 April 2025 in France. It was the 122nd edition of Paris–Roubaix and the 16th event of the 2025 UCI World Tour.

The race was won by Dutch rider Mathieu van der Poel of Alpecin–Deceuninck for the third year in succession, after a battle with world champion Tadej Pogačar of UAE Team Emirates XRG. Van der Poel became the eighth rider to win the race three times, and the third rider to win three times in succession after Octave Lapize in the early 1900s and Francesco Moser in the late 1970s.

The race was marked by decisive attacks by van der Poel, Pogačar and Pedersen. Pogačar crashed with around 40 km (25 mi) remaining, falling back after having to change his bicycle. Leading the race solo, van der Poel was hit in the face by a water bottle thrown by a member of the crowd, before puncturing on the Carrefour de l'Arbre sector of cobblestones. Ultimately neither slowed van der Poel enough to enable a tiring Pogačar to catch him before the finish.

== Route ==
Starting in Compiègne, the race finished on the velodrome in Roubaix after covering 259.2 kilometres (161.1 mi), with 55.3 kilometres (34.4 mi) of cobblestones spread out over 30 sectors. A "small detour" before the entrance of the Trouée d'Arenberg sector (with the objective of slowing the speed of riders and improving safety) replaced the chicane used in the 2024 edition.

== Teams ==
All eighteen UCI WorldTeams and seven UCI ProTeams took part in the race.

UCI WorldTeams

- Alpecin–Deceuninck
- Arkéa–B&B Hotels
- Cofidis
- Decathlon–AG2R La Mondiale
- EF Education–EasyPost
- Groupama–FDJ
- INEOS Grenadiers
- Intermarché–Wanty
- Lidl–Trek
- Movistar Team
- Red Bull–Bora–Hansgrohe
- Soudal–Quick-Step
- Team Bahrain Victorious
- Team Jayco–AlUla
- Team Picnic–PostNL
- UAE Team Emirates XRG
- Visma–Lease a Bike
- XDS Astana Team

UCI ProTeams

- Israel–Premier Tech
- Lotto
- Q36.5 Pro Cycling Team
- Team TotalEnergies
- Tudor Pro Cycling Team
- Unibet Tietema Rockets
- Uno-X Mobility

== Race summary ==
In March 2025, world champion Tadej Pogačar (UAE Team Emirates XRG) announced he would take part in Paris–Roubaix for the first time. Pogačar had previously raced the junior editions of Paris–Roubaix in 2015 and 2016. The last time a reigning Tour de France winner took part in Paris–Roubaix was in 1991 (Greg LeMond), and the last time Paris–Roubaix was won by the reigning Tour de France winner was in 1973 (Eddy Merckx).

Prior to the race, media considered that 2023 and 2024 winner Mathieu van der Poel (Alpecin–Deceuninck) was favourite for the win, with Cycling News noting that he had "a new challenge in the form of Tadej Pogačar". Other contenders included Mads Pedersen (Lidl–Trek), Wout van Aert (Visma–Lease a Bike), Filippo Ganna (INEOS Grenadiers) and Jasper Philipsen (Alpecin–Deceuninck).

A total of 175 riders started at Compiègne, of which 58 did not complete the course to Roubaix Velodrome, with 5 finishing outside the time limit. The race was marked by decisive attacks by van der Poel, Pogačar and Pedersen. Of note, Pogačar crashed in sector 9 of pavé with 38 km (24 mi) left, eventually had to change his bicycle and lost contact with van der Poel. Despite puncturing late in the race, van der Poel won for a third consecutive time, with Pogačar 2nd and Pedersen 3rd. Van der Poel became the eighth rider to win the race three times, and the third rider to win three times in succession after Octave Lapize in the early 1900s and Francesco Moser in the late 1970s.

Following the race, Pogačar stated that the race "was one of the most difficult races of my career". During the race, a spectator threw a water bottle at van der Poel, striking him in the face. Van der Poel expressed anger following the race, calling the incident "attempted manslaughter" and stating that it is "something we have to take legal action against". The spectator's behaviour was condemned by the Union Cycliste Internationale (UCI), as well as by the riders union and other groups. The UCI and van der Poel's team Alpecin–Deceuninck both stated they wished the spectator would be punished for their actions. A man handed himself in to West Flanders police on the following Monday.

== Result ==
Result
Rank	Rider	Team	Time
1	Mathieu van der Poel (NED)	Alpecin–Deceuninck	5h 31' 27"
2	Tadej Pogačar (SLO)	UAE Team Emirates XRG	+ 1' 18"
3	Mads Pedersen (DEN)	Lidl–Trek	+ 2' 11"
4	Wout van Aert (BEL)	Visma–Lease a Bike	+ 2' 11"
5	Florian Vermeersch (BEL)	UAE Team Emirates XRG	+ 2' 11"
6	Jonas Rutsch (GER)	Intermarché–Wanty	+ 3' 46"
7	Stefan Bissegger (SUI)	Decathlon–AG2R La Mondiale	+ 3' 46"
8	Markus Hoelgaard (NOR)	Uno-X Mobility	+ 3' 46"
9	Fred Wright (GBR)	Team Bahrain Victorious	+ 4' 35"
10	Laurenz Rex (BEL)	Intermarché–Wanty	+ 4' 36"
