= 2013 UCI Cyclo-cross World Championships – Men's junior race =

Men's Junior Cyclo-cross Race
2013 UCI Cyclo-cross World Championships
- Rainbow jersey

Race details
- Dates: February 2, 2013
- Stages: 1
- Distance: 16.8 km (10.44 mi)
- Winning time: 40' 47"

Medalists
	Gold	Mathieu van der Poel (NED)
	Silver	Martijn Budding (NED)
	Bronze	Adam Ťoupalík (CZE)

This event was held on February 2, 2013, as a part of the 2013 UCI Cyclo-cross World Championships. Just like last year, Mathieu van der Poel of Netherlands took the gold, becoming the first person to win the junior's event twice.

== Race report ==
Mathieu van der Poel went into the race as the big favourite, having won every single race he competed in during the 2012–2013 cyclo-cross season. This race wasn't different, he went full power from the very start and was safe from start to finish. A fall and a flat tire were not capable of taking it away from him. The race for the second spot was equally quickly decided with Martijn Budding, also from the Netherlands, having a nice lead on those behind him. There was more competition for the third spot, showing a nice battle between Belgians Yannick Peeters and Nicolas Cleppe, the Czech Adam Ťoupalík and the American Logan Owen. Peeters disappeared from that group after a fall, Owen shared the same faith. Cleppe had trouble following Ťoupalík, who took the bronze, and also got overtaken again by Owen who was giving it his all in hopes of reaching the podium.

== Results ==
Rank	Cyclist	Time
Gold medal	Mathieu van der Poel (NED)	40' 47"
Silver medal	Martijn Budding (NED)	+ 57"
Bronze medal	Adam Ťoupalík (CZE)	+ 1' 19"
4	Logan Owen (USA)	+ 1' 23"
5	Nicolas Cleppe (BEL)	+ 1' 25"
6	Dominic Grab (SUI)	+ 1' 33"
7	Yannick Peeters (BEL)	+ 1' 38"
8	Quinten Hermans (BEL)	+ 1' 47"
9	Ben Boets (BEL)	+ 2' 02"
10	Léo Vincent (FRA)	+ 2' 33"
11	Curtis White (USA)	+ 2' 43"
12	Richard Jansen (NED)	+ 2' 53"
13	Kobe Goossens (BEL)	+ 2' 53"
14	Clément Russo (FRA)	+ 3' 20"
15	Karel Pokorný (CZE)	+ 3' 20"
16	Manuel Todaro (ITA)	+ 3' 31"
17	Jake Womersley (GBR)	+ 3' 36"
18	Jack Ravenscroft (GBR)	+ 3' 46"
19	Peter Disera (CAN)	+ 3' 52"
20	Nadir Colledani (ITA)	+ 4' 03"
21	Marco König (GER)	+ 4' 14"
22	Gioele Bertolini (ITA)	+ 4' 21"
23	Billy Harding (GBR)	+ 4' 24"
24	Jan Vastl (CZE)	+ 4' 38"
25	Maxx Chance (USA)	+ 4' 58"
26	Adam King (GBR)	+ 5' 03"
27	David Lombardo (USA)	+ 5' 04"
28	Trevor Pearson (CAN)	+ 5' 12"
29	Élie Gesbert (FRA)	+ 5' 13"
30	Isaac Niles (CAN)	+ 5' 36"
31	Stephen Bassett (USA)	1 LAP
32	Neil Symington (CAN)	2 LAPS
33	Yoshiki Yamada (JPN)	3 LAPS
