= 2026 Omloop Het Nieuwsblad =

Cycling race

2026 UCI World Tour, race 4 of 36
- Event poster with previous winners Søren Wærenskjold and Lotte Claes

Race details
- Dates: 28 February 2026
- Stages: 1
- Distance: 207 km (129 mi)
- Winning time: 4h 53' 55"

Results
	Winner	Mathieu van der Poel (NED)	(Alpecin–Premier Tech)
	Second	Tim van Dijke (NED)	(Red Bull–Bora–Hansgrohe)
	Third	Florian Vermeersch (BEL)	(UAE Team Emirates XRG)

The 2026 Omloop Het Nieuwsblad was a road cycling one-day race that took place on 28 February in Belgium, starting in Ghent and finishing in Ninove. It was the 81st edition of the Omloop Het Nieuwsblad and the fourth event of the 2026 UCI World Tour.

The race was won by Dutch rider Mathieu van der Poel of Alpecin–Premier Tech, after attacking on the Muur van Geraardsbergen and riding 16 kilometres solo to the finish.

== Teams ==
Twenty-five teams participated in the race, including all eighteen UCI WorldTeams and seven UCI ProSeries teams.

UCI WorldTeams

- Alpecin–Premier Tech
- Decathlon CMA CGM
- EF Education–EasyPost
- Groupama–FDJ United
- INEOS Grenadiers
- Lidl–Trek
- Lotto–Intermarché
- Movistar Team
- NSN Cycling Team
- Red Bull–Bora–Hansgrohe
- Soudal–Quick-Step
- Team Bahrain Victorious
- Team Jayco–AlUla
- Team Picnic–PostNL
- Visma–Lease a Bike
- UAE Team Emirates XRG
- Uno-X Mobility
- XDS Astana Team

UCI ProSeries Teams

- Burgos Burpellet BH
- Cofidis
- Pinarello–Q36.5 Pro Cycling Team
- Team TotalEnergies
- Tudor Pro Cycling Team
- Unibet Rose Rockets
- Team Flanders–Baloise

== Result ==
Result
Rank	Rider	Team	Time
1	Mathieu van der Poel (NED)	Alpecin–Premier Tech	4h 53' 55"
2	Tim van Dijke (NED)	Red Bull–Bora–Hansgrohe	+ 22"
3	Florian Vermeersch (BEL)	UAE Team Emirates XRG	+ 24"
4	Christophe Laporte (FRA)	Visma–Lease a Bike	+ 53"
5	Aimé De Gendt (BEL)	Pinarello–Q36.5 Pro Cycling Team	+ 54"
6	Tobias Lund Andresen (DEN)	Decathlon CMA CGM	+ 57"
7	Jordi Meeus (BEL)	Red Bull–Bora–Hansgrohe	+ 57"
8	Anthony Turgis (FRA)	Team TotalEnergies	+ 57"
9	Alexis Renard (FRA)	Cofidis	+ 57"
10	Luke Lamperti (USA)	EF Education–EasyPost	+ 57"
