= 2024 UCI Gravel World Championships =

Gravel world championships in 2024

- Venue: Flemish Brabant, Belgium
- Date: 5–6 October 2024

The 2024 UCI Gravel World Championships were held on 5 and 6 October 2024 in Flemish Brabant, Belgium. It was third time the gravel world championships were held.

== Medal summary ==
| Event | Gold | | Silver | | Bronze | |
|---|---|---|---|---|---|---|
Men's Events
| Men elite | Mathieu van der Poel (NED) | 4h 41' 23" | Florian Vermeersch (BEL) | + 1' 03" | Quinten Hermans (BEL) | + 3' 47" |
Women's Events
| Women elite | Marianne Vos (NED) | 4h 01' 07" | Lotte Kopecky (BEL) | + 1" | Lorena Wiebes (NED) | + 3' 57" |
