= 2026 E3 Saxo Classic =

Cycling race

2026 UCI World Tour, race 11 of 36

Race details
- Dates: 27 March 2026
- Stages: 1
- Distance: 208.8 km (129.7 mi)
- Winning time: 4h 45' 15"

Results
	Winner	Mathieu van der Poel (NED)	(Alpecin–Premier Tech)
	Second	Per Strand Hagenes (NOR)	(Visma–Lease a Bike)
	Third	Florian Vermeersch (BEL)	(UAE Team Emirates XRG)

The 2026 E3 Saxo Classic was a road cycling one-day race that took place on 27 March in Belgium. It was the 68th edition of the E3 Saxo Classic, and the 11th event of the 2026 UCI World Tour.

== Teams ==
Twenty-four teams participated in the race, including all eighteen UCI WorldTeams and six UCI ProTeams.

UCI WorldTeams

- Alpecin–Premier Tech
- Decathlon CMA CGM
- EF Education–EasyPost
- Groupama–FDJ United
- INEOS Grenadiers
- Lidl–Trek
- Lotto–Intermarché
- Movistar Team
- NSN Cycling Team
- Red Bull–Bora–Hansgrohe
- Soudal–Quick-Step
- Team Bahrain Victorious
- Team Jayco–AlUla
- Team Picnic–PostNL
- Visma–Lease a Bike
- UAE Team Emirates XRG
- Uno-X Mobility
- XDS Astana Team

UCI ProTeams

- Burgos Burpellet BH
- Pinarello–Q36.5 Pro Cycling Team
- Team Flanders–Baloise
- Team TotalEnergies
- Tudor Pro Cycling Team
- Unibet Rose Rockets

== Result ==
Result (1–10)
Rank	Rider	Team	Time
1	Mathieu van der Poel (NED)	Alpecin–Premier Tech	4h 45' 15"
2	Per Strand Hagenes (NOR)	Visma–Lease a Bike	+ 3"
3	Florian Vermeersch (BEL)	UAE Team Emirates XRG	+ 3"
4	Stan Dewulf (BEL)	Decathlon CMA CGM	+ 3"
5	Jonas Abrahamsen (NOR)	Uno-X Mobility	+ 3"
6	Tobias Lund Andresen (DEN)	Decathlon CMA CGM	+ 24"
7	Christophe Laporte (FRA)	Visma–Lease a Bike	+ 24"
8	Gianni Vermeersch (BEL)	Red Bull–Bora–Hansgrohe	+ 24"
9	Mads Pedersen (DEN)	Lidl–Trek	+ 24"
10	Matteo Trentin (ITA)	Tudor Pro Cycling Team	+ 24"
