= 2017 UEC European Cyclo-cross Championships =

Cycling event

- Venue: Tábor, Czech Republic
- Date: 5 November 2017
- Nations participating: 236
- Cyclists participating: 15
- Events: 5

The 2017 UEC European Cyclo-cross Championships was the European Championship for cyclo-cross for the season 2017–18. It was held in Tábor in Czech Republic on Sunday 5 November 2017. The championships featured five events; men's races for elite, under-23 and junior riders, and women's races for elite and under-23 riders.

== Schedule ==
Sunday 5 November 2017

- 09:00 Men's Junior
- 10:15 Women's Under 23
- 11:30 Men's Under 23
- 13:00 Women's Elite
- 14:30 Men's Elite

All times in local time (UTC+1).

== Medal summary ==
Event	Gold		Silver		Bronze	
Men's events
Men's elite race	Mathieu van der Poel; Netherlands	57' 37"	Lars van der Haar; Netherlands	+ 23"	Toon Aerts; Belgium	+ 1' 26"
Men's under-23 race	Eli Iserbyt; Belgium	53' 19"	Thomas Pidcock; Great Britain	s.t.	Sieben Wouters; Netherlands	+7"
Men's junior race	Loris Rouiller; Switzerland	39' 16"	Tomáš Kopecký; Czech Republic	+ 2"	Ben Tulett; Great Britain	+ 8"
Women's events
Women's elite race	Sanne Cant; Belgium	41' 57"	Lucinda Brand; Netherlands	s.t.	Alice Maria Arzuffi; Italy	+ 15"
Women's under-23 race	Chiara Teocchi; Italy	35' 36"	Laura Verdonschot; Belgium	s.t.	Nikola Nosková; Czech Republic	+ 4"
