= 2022 UCI Gravel World Championships =

Gravel world championships in 2022

- Venue: Veneto, Italy
- Date: 8–9 October 2022
- Events: 12

The 2022 UCI Gravel World Championships were held on 8 and 9 October 2022 in Veneto, Italy. It was the first time the gravel world championships were held.

== Schedule ==
All times listed below are for the local time – Central European Summer Time or UTC+02:00.

Date	Start time	Event	Location (start)	Location (finish)	Distance
8 October	12:00	2022 UCI Gravel World Championships – Women's elite	Vicenza	Cittadella	139.2 km (86.5 mi)
8 October	12:15	2022 UCI Gravel World Championships – Men 50+	Vicenza	Cittadella	139.2 km (86.5 mi)
8 October	12:20	2022 UCI Gravel World Championships – Women 19–34	Vicenza	Cittadella	139.2 km (86.5 mi)
8 October	12:20	2022 UCI Gravel World Championships – Women 35–39	Vicenza	Cittadella	139.2 km (86.5 mi)
8 October	12:20	2022 UCI Gravel World Championships – Women 40–44	Vicenza	Cittadella	139.2 km (86.5 mi)
8 October	12:20	2022 UCI Gravel World Championships – Women 45–49	Vicenza	Cittadella	139.2 km (86.5 mi)
8 October	12:20	2022 UCI Gravel World Championships – Women 50+	Vicenza	Cittadella	139.2 km (86.5 mi)
9 October	12:00	2022 UCI Gravel World Championships – Men elite	Vicenza	Cittadella	194.1 km (120.6 mi)
9 October	12:15	2022 UCI Gravel World Championships – Men 19–34	Vicenza	Cittadella	166.6 km (103.5 mi)
9 October	12:15	2022 UCI Gravel World Championships – Men 35–39	Vicenza	Cittadella	166.6 km (103.5 mi)
9 October	12:20	2022 UCI Gravel World Championships – Men 40–44	Vicenza	Cittadella	166.6 km (103.5 mi)
9 October	12:20	2022 UCI Gravel World Championships – Men 40–49	Vicenza	Cittadella	166.6 km (103.5 mi)

== Medal summary ==
Event	Gold		Silver		Bronze	
Men's Events
Men elite	Gianni Vermeersch (BEL)	5h 10' 41"	Daniel Oss (ITA)	+ 44"	Mathieu van der Poel (NED)	+ 1' 29"
Women's Events
Women elite	Pauline Ferrand-Prévot (FRA)	4h 09' 07"	Sina Frei (SUI)	+ 0"	Chiara Teocchi (ITA)	+ 11"
