= 2025 E3 Saxo Classic =

Cycling race

2025 UCI World Tour, race 11 of 36

Race details
- Dates: 28 March 2025
- Stages: 1
- Distance: 208 km (129 mi)
- Winning time: 4h 38' 11"

Results
	Winner	Mathieu van der Poel (NED)	(Alpecin–Deceuninck)
	Second	Mads Pedersen (DEN)	(Lidl–Trek)
	Third	Filippo Ganna (ITA)	(Netcompany INEOS)

The 2025 E3 Saxo Classic was a road cycling one-day race that took place on 28 March in Belgium. It was the 67th edition of the E3 Saxo Bank Classic, and the 11th event of the 2025 UCI World Tour.

== Teams ==
Twenty-five teams participated in the race, including all eighteen UCI WorldTeams and seven UCI ProTeams.

UCI WorldTeams

- Alpecin–Deceuninck
- Arkéa–B&B Hotels
- Cofidis
- Decathlon–AG2R La Mondiale
- EF Education–EasyPost
- Groupama–FDJ
- INEOS Grenadiers
- Intermarché–Wanty
- Lidl–Trek
- Movistar Team
- Red Bull–Bora–Hansgrohe
- Soudal–Quick-Step
- Team Bahrain Victorious
- Team Jayco–AlUla
- Team Picnic–PostNL
- UAE Team Emirates XRG
- Visma–Lease a Bike
- XDS Astana Team

UCI ProTeams

- Israel–Premier Tech
- Lotto
- Q36.5 Pro Cycling Team
- Team Flanders–Baloise
- Team TotalEnergies
- Tudor Pro Cycling Team
- Uno-X Mobility

== Result ==
Result (1–10)
Rank	Rider	Team	Time
1	Mathieu van der Poel (NED)	Alpecin–Deceuninck	4h 38' 11"
2	Mads Pedersen (DEN)	Lidl–Trek	+ 1' 05"
3	Filippo Ganna (ITA)	INEOS Grenadiers	+ 2' 04"
4	Casper Pedersen (DEN)	Soudal–Quick-Step	+ 2' 33"
5	Jasper Stuyven (BEL)	Lidl–Trek	+ 2' 33"
6	Stefan Küng (SUI)	Groupama–FDJ	+ 2' 33"
7	Aimé De Gendt (BEL)	Cofidis	+ 2' 33"
8	Tim Wellens (BEL)	UAE Team Emirates XRG	+ 2' 35"
9	Matteo Jorgenson (USA)	Visma–Lease a Bike	+ 2' 38"
10	Mike Teunissen (NED)	XDS Astana Team	+ 2' 43"
