= 2026 Tour of Flanders (men's race) =

Cycling race

2026 UCI World Tour, race 14 of 36
- Event poster with previous winners Lotte Kopecky and Tadej Pogačar

Race details
- Dates: 5 April 2026
- Stages: 1
- Distance: 278 km (173 mi)
- Winning time: 6h 20' 07"

Results
	Winner	Tadej Pogačar (SLO)	(UAE Team Emirates XRG)
	Second	Mathieu van der Poel (NED)	(Alpecin–Premier Tech)
	Third	Remco Evenepoel (BEL)	(Red Bull–Bora–Hansgrohe)

The 2026 Tour of Flanders was a one-day cycling classic which took place on 5 April 2026. It was the 110th edition of the Tour of Flanders, and the 14th event of the 2026 UCI World Tour.

The race was won by Slovenian rider, Tadej Pogačar of UAE Team Emirates XRG, successfully defending his title from the previous year. The victory marked his third win of the race, tying the record for the most number of victories in the race. Second place went to Mathieu van der Poel of Alpecin–Premier Tech, marking his seventh consecutive podium placement. The last place on the podium was occupied by Red Bull–Bora–Hansgrohe's Remco Evenepoel in his debut in the race.

== Teams ==
All eighteen UCI WorldTeams and seven UCI ProTeams participated in the race. All teams entered a full squad of seven riders.

UCI WorldTeams

- Alpecin–Premier Tech
- Decathlon CMA CGM
- EF Education–EasyPost
- Groupama–FDJ United
- INEOS Grenadiers
- Lotto–Intermarché
- Lidl–Trek
- Movistar Team
- NSN Cycling Team
- Red Bull–Bora–Hansgrohe
- Soudal–Quick-Step
- Team Bahrain Victorious
- Team Jayco–AlUla
- Team Picnic–PostNL
- UAE Team Emirates XRG
- Uno-X Mobility
- Visma–Lease a Bike
- XDS Astana Team

UCI ProTeams

- Burgos Burpellet BH
- Cofidis
- Pinarello–Q36.5 Pro Cycling Team
- Team Flanders–Baloise
- Team TotalEnergies
- Tudor Pro Cycling Team
- Unibet Rose Rockets

== Result ==
Result
Rank	Rider	Team	Time
1	Tadej Pogačar (SLO)	UAE Team Emirates XRG	6h 20' 07"
2	Mathieu van der Poel (NED)	Alpecin–Premier Tech	+ 34"
3	Remco Evenepoel (BEL)	Red Bull–Bora–Hansgrohe	+ 1' 11"
4	Wout van Aert (BEL)	Visma–Lease a Bike	+ 2' 04"
5	Mads Pedersen (DEN)	Lidl–Trek	+ 2' 48"
6	Jasper Stuyven (BEL)	Soudal–Quick-Step	+ 4' 28"
7	Florian Vermeersch (BEL)	UAE Team Emirates XRG	+ 4' 28"
8	Matej Mohorič (SLO)	Team Bahrain Victorious	+ 4' 30"
9	Christophe Laporte (FRA)	Visma–Lease a Bike	+ 5' 22"
10	Gianni Vermeersch (BEL)	Red Bull–Bora–Hansgrohe	+ 5' 22"
