= 2023 Milan–San Remo =

Italian one-day cycling race

2023 UCI World Tour, race 8 of 35
- Event poster

Race details
- Dates: 18 March 2023
- Stages: 1
- Distance: 294 km (183 mi)
- Winning time: 6h 25' 23"

Results
	Winner	Mathieu van der Poel (NED)	(Alpecin–Deceuninck)
	Second	Filippo Ganna (ITA)	(INEOS Grenadiers)
	Third	Wout van Aert (BEL)	(Team Jumbo–Visma)

The 2023 Milan–San Remo was a road cycling one-day race that took place on 18 March 2023 in northwestern Italy. It was the 114th edition of the Milan–San Remo cycling classic.

The race was won by Dutch rider Mathieu van der Poel of Alpecin–Deceuninck, after an attack on the decent from the Poggio climb.

== Teams ==
Twenty-five teams participated in the race.

UCI WorldTeams

- AG2R Citroën Team
- Alpecin–Deceuninck
- Arkéa–Samsic
- Astana Qazaqstan Team
- Bora–Hansgrohe
- Cofidis
- EF Education–EasyPost
- Groupama–FDJ
- INEOS Grenadiers
- Intermarché–Circus–Wanty
- Movistar Team
- Soudal–Quick-Step
- Team Bahrain Victorious
- Team DSM
- Team Jayco–AlUla
- Team Jumbo–Visma
- Trek–Segafredo
- UAE Team Emirates

UCI ProTeams

- Eolo–Kometa
- Green Project–Bardiani–CSF–Faizanè
- Israel–Premier Tech
- Lotto–Dstny
- Q36.5 Pro Cycling Team
- Team TotalEnergies
- Tudor Pro Cycling Team

== Result ==
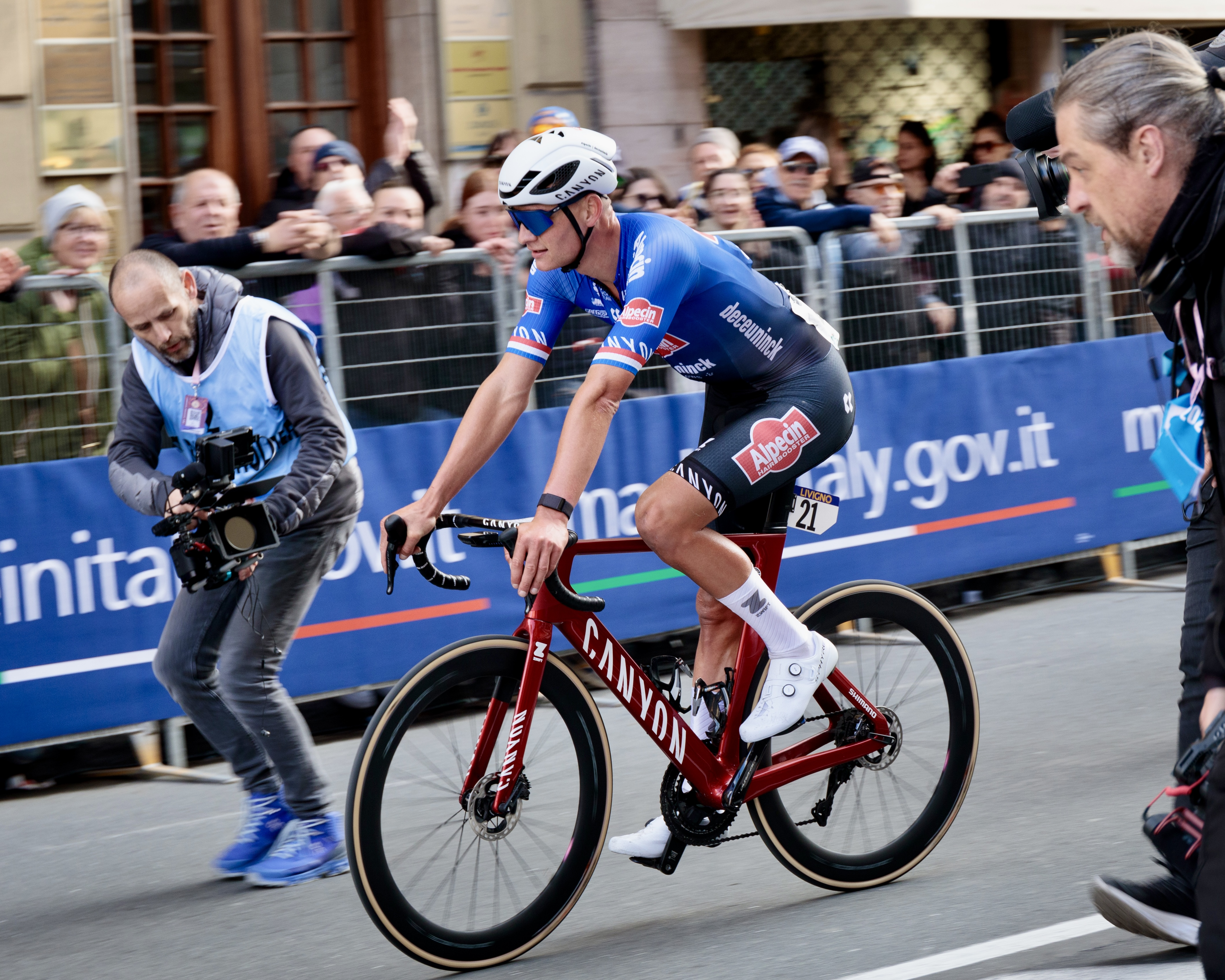
Winner of the 2023 edition, Mathieu van der Poel

Result (1–10)
Rank	Rider	Team	Time
1	Mathieu van der Poel (NED)	Alpecin–Deceuninck	6h 25' 23"
2	Filippo Ganna (ITA)	INEOS Grenadiers	+ 15"
3	Wout van Aert (BEL)	Team Jumbo–Visma	+ 15"
4	Tadej Pogačar (SLO)	UAE Team Emirates	+ 15"
5	Søren Kragh Andersen (DEN)	Alpecin–Deceuninck	+ 26"
6	Mads Pedersen (DEN)	Trek–Segafredo	+ 26"
7	Neilson Powless (USA)	EF Education–EasyPost	+ 26"
8	Matej Mohorič (SLO)	Team Bahrain Victorious	+ 26"
9	Anthony Turgis (FRA)	Team TotalEnergies	+ 26"
10	Jasper Stuyven (BEL)	Trek–Segafredo	+ 26"
