= 2024 Paris–Roubaix =

Cycling race

2024 UCI World Tour, race 16 of 35
- Event poster

Race details
- Dates: 7 April 2024
- Stages: 1
- Distance: 259.7 km (161.4 mi)
- Winning time: 5h 25' 58"

Results
	Winner	Mathieu van der Poel (NED)	(Alpecin–Deceuninck)
	Second	Jasper Philipsen (BEL)	(Alpecin–Deceuninck)
	Third	Mads Pedersen (DEN)	(Lidl–Trek)

The 2024 Paris–Roubaix was a road cycling one-day race that took place on 7 April in France. It was the 121st edition of Paris–Roubaix and the 16th event of the 2024 UCI World Tour.

The race was won by Dutch rider Mathieu van der Poel of Alpecin–Deceuninck for the second year in succession, after a solo attack over 60 kilometres. The margin of victory (3 minutes exactly) was the largest since the 2002 edition of the race. For the third year in succession, the race was the fastest on record with an average speed of 47.85 kilometres per hour (29.73 mph), beating the record set during the 2023 edition.

== Route ==
Starting in Compiègne, the race finished on the velodrome in Roubaix after covering 259.7 kilometres (161.4 mi), with 55.7 kilometres (34.6 mi) of cobblestones (the longest in 30 years), spread out over 29 sectors. A chicane was added prior to the entrance of the Trouée d'Arenberg sector, to slow the speed of riders and improve safety. Some riders criticised the decision, with Mathieu van der Poel stating "Is this a joke?".

== Teams ==
All eighteen UCI WorldTeams and seven UCI ProTeams took part in the race.

UCI WorldTeams

- Alpecin–Deceuninck
- Arkéa–B&B Hotels
- Astana Qazaqstan Team
- Bora–Hansgrohe
- Cofidis
- Decathlon–AG2R La Mondiale
- EF Education–EasyPost
- Groupama–FDJ
- INEOS Grenadiers
- Intermarché–Wanty
- Lidl–Trek
- Movistar Team
- Soudal–Quick-Step
- Team Bahrain Victorious
- Team dsm–firmenich PostNL
- Team Jayco–AlUla
- UAE Team Emirates
- Visma–Lease a Bike

UCI ProTeams

- Bingoal WB
- Israel–Premier Tech
- Lotto–Dstny
- Q36.5 Pro Cycling Team
- Team Flanders–Baloise
- Team TotalEnergies
- Uno-X Mobility

== Result ==
Result
Rank	Rider	Team	Time
1	Mathieu van der Poel (NED)	Alpecin–Deceuninck	5h 25' 58"
2	Jasper Philipsen (BEL)	Alpecin–Deceuninck	+ 3' 00"
3	Mads Pedersen (DEN)	Lidl–Trek	+ 3' 00"
4	Nils Politt (GER)	UAE Team Emirates	+ 3' 00"
5	Stefan Küng (SUI)	Groupama–FDJ	+ 3' 15"
6	Gianni Vermeersch (BEL)	Alpecin–Deceuninck	+ 3' 47"
7	Laurence Pithie (NZL)	Groupama–FDJ	+ 3' 48"
8	Jordi Meeus (BEL)	Bora–Hansgrohe	+ 4' 47"
9	Søren Wærenskjold (NOR)	Uno-X Mobility	+ 4' 47"
10	Madis Mihkels (EST)	Intermarché–Wanty	+ 4' 47"
