= 2015 UCI Cyclo-cross World Championships =

Cyclo-cross championship

- Venue: Tábor, Czech Republic
- Date: 31 January–1 February 2015
- Coordinates: 49°24′52″N 14°39′28″E
- Events: 4

The 2015 UCI Cyclo-cross World Championships is the World Championship for cyclo-cross for the season 2014–15. It took place in Tábor, Czech Republic on Saturday 31 January and Sunday 1 February 2015.

== Medal summary ==
=== Medalists ===
| Event | Gold | | Silver | | Bronze | |
|---|---|---|---|---|---|---|
Men's events
| Men's elite race | Mathieu van der Poel; Netherlands | 1h 09' 12" | Wout Van Aert; Belgium | + 15" | Lars van der Haar; Netherlands | + 17" |
| Men's under-23 race | Michael Vanthourenhout; Belgium | 49' 55" | Laurens Sweeck; Belgium | + 10" | Stan Godrie; Netherlands | + 14" |
| Men's junior race | Simon Andreassen; Denmark | 42' 24" | Eli Iserbyt; Belgium | + 41" | Max Gulinkx; Netherlands | + 42" |
Women's events
| Women's elite race | Pauline Ferrand-Prévot; France | 49' 10" | Sanne Cant; Belgium | + 1" | Marianne Vos; Netherlands | + 15" |

=== Medal table ===
* Host nation (Czech Republic)

| Rank | Nation | Gold | Silver | Bronze | Total |
|---|---|---|---|---|---|
| 1 | Belgium (BEL) | 1 | 4 | 0 | 5 |
| 2 | Netherlands (NED) | 1 | 0 | 4 | 5 |
| 3 | Denmark (DEN) | 1 | 0 | 0 | 1 |
| 3 | France (FRA) | 1 | 0 | 0 | 1 |
| Totals (4 entries) | | 4 | 4 | 4 | 12 |
