= 2023 Paris–Roubaix =

Cycling race

2023 UCI World Tour, race 16 of 35
- Event poster with previous winner Dylan van Baarle

Race details
- Dates: 9 April 2023
- Stages: 1
- Distance: 256.6 km (159.4 mi)
- Winning time: 5h 28' 41"

Results
	Winner	Mathieu van der Poel (NED)	(Alpecin–Deceuninck)
	Second	Jasper Philipsen (BEL)	(Alpecin–Deceuninck)
	Third	Wout van Aert (BEL)	(Team Jumbo–Visma)

The 2023 Paris–Roubaix was a road cycling one-day race that took place on 9 April 2023 in France. It was the 120th edition of Paris–Roubaix and the 16th event of the 2023 UCI World Tour. The race was won by Dutch rider Mathieu van der Poel of Alpecin–Deceuninck.

The race was the fastest edition on record with an average speed of 46.84 kilometres per hour (29.11 mph), beating the record set during the 2022 edition.

== Teams ==
All eighteen UCI WorldTeams and seven UCI ProTeams took part in the race.

UCI WorldTeams

- AG2R Citroën Team
- Alpecin–Deceuninck
- Arkéa–Samsic
- Astana Qazaqstan Team
- Bora–Hansgrohe
- Cofidis
- EF Education–EasyPost
- Groupama–FDJ
- Ineos Grenadiers
- Intermarché–Circus–Wanty
- Movistar Team
- Soudal–Quick-Step
- Team Bahrain Victorious
- Team DSM
- Team Jayco–AlUla
- Team Jumbo–Visma
- Trek–Segafredo
- UAE Team Emirates

UCI ProTeams

- Bingoal WB
- Israel–Premier Tech
- Lotto–Dstny
- Q36.5 Pro Cycling Team
- Team Flanders–Baloise
- Team TotalEnergies
- Uno-X Pro Cycling Team

== Result ==
Result
Rank	Rider	Team	Time
1	Mathieu van der Poel (NED)	Alpecin–Deceuninck	5h 28' 41"
2	Jasper Philipsen (BEL)	Alpecin–Deceuninck	+ 46"
3	Wout van Aert (BEL)	Team Jumbo–Visma	+ 46"
4	Mads Pedersen (DEN)	Trek–Segafredo	+ 50"
5	Stefan Küng (SUI)	Groupama–FDJ	+ 50"
6	Filippo Ganna (ITA)	Ineos Grenadiers	+ 50"
7	John Degenkolb (GER)	Team DSM	+ 2' 35"
8	Max Walscheid (GER)	Cofidis	+ 3' 31"
9	Laurenz Rex (BEL)	Intermarché–Circus–Wanty	+ 3' 35"
10	Christophe Laporte (FRA)	Team Jumbo–Visma	+ 4' 11"
