= 2022 Four Days of Dunkirk =

2022 UCI ProSeries

Race details
- Dates: 3–8 May
- Stages: 6
- Distance: 1,050 km (652.4 mi)
- Winning time: 25h 00' 26"

Results
Jersey awarded to the overall winner	Winner	Philippe Gilbert (BEL)	(Lotto–Soudal)
	Second	Oliver Naesen (BEL)	(AG2R Citroën Team)
	Third	Jake Stewart (GBR)	(Groupama–FDJ)
Jersey awarded to the points classification winner	Points	Jason Tesson (FRA)	(St. Michel–Auber93)
Jersey awarded to the mountains classification winner	Mountains	Alex Colman (BEL)	(Sport Vlaanderen–Baloise)
Jersey awarded to the youth classification winner	Youth	Jake Stewart (GBR)	(Groupama–FDJ)
	Team	Lotto–Soudal	

The 2022 Four Days of Dunkirk (French: Quatre Jours de Dunkerque 2022) was the 66th edition of the Four Days of Dunkirk cycling stage race. It started on 3 May in Dunkirk and ended on 8 May again in Dunkirk.

== Teams ==
Six of the eighteen UCI WorldTeams, eight UCI ProTeams, and four UCI Continental team made up the eighteen teams that participated in the race.

UCI WorldTeams

- AG2R Citroën Team
- Cofidis
- Groupama–FDJ
- Intermarché–Wanty–Gobert Matériaux
- Lotto–Soudal
- Team DSM

UCI ProTeams

- Alpecin–Fenix
- Arkéa–Samsic
- B&B Hotels–KTM
- Bingoal Pauwels Sauces WB
- Burgos BH
- Human Powered Health
- Sport Vlaanderen–Baloise
- Team TotalEnergies

UCI Continental Teams

- Go Sport–Roubaix–Lille Métropole
- Nice Métropole Côte d'Azur
- St. Michel–Auber93
- Team UC Nantes Atlantique

== Route ==
Stage characteristics and winners
Stage	Date	Course	Distance	Type	Stage winner
1	3 May	Dunkirk to Aniche	161.1 km (100.1 mi)	Flat stage	Arvid De Kleijn (NED)
2	4 May	Béthune to Maubege	181.5 km (112.8 mi)	Flat stage	Jason Tesson (FRA)
3	5 May	Péronne to Mont-Saint-Éloi	170 km (110 mi)	Hilly stage	Philippe Gilbert (BEL)
4	6 May	Mazingarbe to Aire-sur-la-Lys	170.8 km (106.1 mi)	Hilly stage	Lionel Taminiaux (BEL)
5	7 May	Roubaix to Cassel	183.7 km (114.1 mi)	Hilly stage	Gianni Vermeersch (BEL)
6	8 May	Ardres to Dunkirk	182.9 km (113.6 mi)	Flat stage	Gerben Thijssen (BEL)

== Stages ==
=== Stage 1 ===
3 May 2022 — Dunkirk to Aniche, 161.1 km (100.1 mi)

Stage 1 Result
Rank	Rider	Team	Time
1	Arvid de Kleijn (NED)	Human Powered Health	3h 31' 14"
2	Jason Tesson (FRA)	St. Michel–Auber93	+ 0"
3	Nils Eekhoff (NED)	Team DSM	+ 0"
4	Pierre Barbier (FRA)	B&B Hotels–KTM	+ 0"
5	Alexis Renard (FRA)	Cofidis	+ 0"
6	Arnaud De Lie (BEL)	Lotto–Soudal	+ 0"
7	Bram Welten (NED)	Groupama–FDJ	+ 0"
8	Daniel McLay (GBR)	Arkéa–Samsic	+ 0"
9	Arne Marit (BEL)	Sport Vlaanderen–Baloise	+ 0"
10	Stanisław Aniołkowski (POL)	Bingoal Pauwels Sauces WB	+ 0"

General classification after Stage 1
Rank	Rider	Team	Time
1	Arvid de Kleijn (NED)	Human Powered Health	3h 31' 04"
2	Jason Tesson (FRA)	St. Michel–Auber93	+ 4"
3	Nils Eekhoff (NED)	Team DSM	+ 6"
4	Cyril Barthe (FRA)	B&B Hotels–KTM	+ 6"
5	Milan Fretin (BEL)	Sport Vlaanderen–Baloise	+ 6"
6	Evaldas Šiškevičius (LTU)	Go Sport–Roubaix–Lille Métropole	+ 6"
7	Clément Russo (FRA)	Arkéa–Samsic	+ 7"
8	Stanisław Aniołkowski (POL)	Bingoal Pauwels Sauces WB	+ 8"
9	Axel Zingle (FRA)	Cofidis	+ 9"
10	Pierre Barbier (FRA)	B&B Hotels–KTM	+ 10"

=== Stage 2 ===
4 May 2022 — Béthune to Maubege, 181.5 km (112.8 mi)

Stage 2 Result
Rank	Rider	Team	Time
1	Jason Tesson (FRA)	St. Michel–Auber93	4h 04' 25"
2	Gerben Thijssen (BEL)	Intermarché–Wanty–Gobert Matériaux	+ 0"
3	Thomas Boudat (FRA)	Go Sport–Roubaix–Lille Métropole	+ 0"
4	Arvid de Kleijn (NED)	Human Powered Health	+ 0"
5	Hugo Hofstetter (FRA)	Arkéa–Samsic	+ 0"
6	Clément Russo (FRA)	Arkéa–Samsic	+ 0"
7	Marc Sarreau (FRA)	AG2R Citroën Team	+ 0"
8	Lorrenzo Manzin (FRA)	Team TotalEnergies	+ 0"
9	Bram Welten (NED)	Groupama–FDJ	+ 0"
10	Óscar Pelegrí (ESP)	Burgos BH	+ 0"

General classification after Stage 2
Rank	Rider	Team	Time
1	Jason Tesson (FRA)	St. Michel–Auber93	7h 35' 20"
2	Arvid de Kleijn (NED)	Human Powered Health	+ 9"
3	Gerben Thijssen (BEL)	Intermarché–Wanty–Gobert Matériaux	+ 13"
4	Evaldas Šiškevičius (LTU)	Go Sport–Roubaix–Lille Métropole	+ 13"
5	Nils Eekhoff (NED)	Team DSM	+ 15"
6	Cyril Barthe (FRA)	B&B Hotels–KTM	+ 15"
7	Thomas Boudat (FRA)	Go Sport–Roubaix–Lille Métropole	+ 15"
8	Clément Russo (FRA)	Arkéa–Samsic	+ 16"
9	Samuel Watson (GBR)	Groupama–FDJ	+ 16"
10	Ángel Fuentes (ESP)	Burgos BH	+ 16"

=== Stage 3 ===
5 May 2022 — Péronne to Mont-Saint-Éloi, 170 km (110 mi)

Stage 3 Result
Rank	Rider	Team	Time
1	Philippe Gilbert (BEL)	Lotto–Soudal	4h 22' 14"
2	Jason Tesson (FRA)	St. Michel–Auber93	+ 0"
3	Julien Simon (FRA)	Team TotalEnergies	+ 0"
4	Pierre Barbier (FRA)	B&B Hotels–KTM	+ 0"
5	Hugo Hofstetter (FRA)	Arkéa–Samsic	+ 0"
6	Clément Russo (FRA)	Arkéa–Samsic	+ 0"
7	Baptiste Planckaert (BEL)	Intermarché–Wanty–Gobert Matériaux	+ 0"
8	Lionel Taminiaux (BEL)	Alpecin–Fenix	+ 0"
9	Marc Sarreau (FRA)	AG2R Citroën Team	+ 0"
10	Benjamin Thomas (FRA)	Cofidis	+ 0"

General classification after Stage 3
Rank	Rider	Team	Time
1	Arvid de Kleijn (NED)	Human Powered Health	11h 57' 43"
2	Philippe Gilbert (BEL)	Lotto–Soudal	+ 0"
3	Samuel Leroux (FRA)	Go Sport–Roubaix–Lille Métropole	+ 1"
4	Gerben Thijssen (BEL)	Intermarché–Wanty–Gobert Matériaux	+ 4"
5	Evaldas Šiškevičius (LTU)	Go Sport–Roubaix–Lille Métropole	+ 4"
6	Thomas Boudat (FRA)	Go Sport–Roubaix–Lille Métropole	+ 6"
7	Nils Eekhoff (NED)	Team DSM	+ 6"
8	Cyril Barthe (FRA)	B&B Hotels–KTM	+ 6"
9	Julien Simon (FRA)	Team TotalEnergies	+ 6"
10	Clément Russo (FRA)	Arkéa–Samsic	+ 7"

=== Stage 4 ===
6 May 2022 — Mazingarbe to Aire-sur-la-Lys, 170.8 km (106.1 mi)

Stage 4 Result
Rank	Rider	Team	Time
1	Lionel Taminiaux (BEL)	Alpecin–Fenix	4h 01' 54"
2	Stanisław Aniołkowski (POL)	Bingoal Pauwels Sauces WB	+ 0"
3	Gerben Thijssen (BEL)	Intermarché–Wanty–Gobert Matériaux	+ 0"
4	Lorrenzo Manzin (FRA)	Team TotalEnergies	+ 0"
5	Arvid de Kleijn (NED)	Human Powered Health	+ 0"
6	Bram Welten (NED)	Groupama–FDJ	+ 0"
7	Reinardt Janse van Rensburg (RSA)	Lotto–Soudal	+ 0"
8	Jules Hesters (BEL)	Sport Vlaanderen–Baloise	+ 0"
9	Nils Eekhoff (NED)	Team DSM	+ 0"
10	Mihkel Räim (EST)	Burgos BH	+ 0"

General classification after Stage 4
Rank	Rider	Team	Time
1	Evaldas Šiškevičius (LTU)	Go Sport–Roubaix–Lille Métropole	15h 59' 36"
2	Gerben Thijssen (BEL)	Intermarché–Wanty–Gobert Matériaux	+ 1"
3	Arvid de Kleijn (NED)	Human Powered Health	+ 1"
4	Lionel Taminiaux (BEL)	Alpecin–Fenix	+ 1"
5	Philippe Gilbert (BEL)	Lotto–Soudal	+ 1"
6	Samuel Leroux (FRA)	Go Sport–Roubaix–Lille Métropole	+ 2"
7	Stanisław Aniołkowski (POL)	Bingoal Pauwels Sauces WB	+ 3"
8	Alexandre Delettre (FRA)	Cofidis	+ 6"
9	Nils Eekhoff (NED)	Team DSM	+ 7"
10	Thomas Boudat (FRA)	Go Sport–Roubaix–Lille Métropole	+ 7"

=== Stage 5 ===
7 May 2022 — Roubaix to Cassel, 183.7 km (114.1 mi)

Stage 5 Result
Rank	Rider	Team	Time
1	Gianni Vermeersch (BEL)	Alpecin–Fenix	4h 39' 56"
2	Oliver Naesen (BEL)	AG2R Citroën Team	+ 0"
3	Jake Stewart (GBR)	Groupama–FDJ	+ 0"
4	Philippe Gilbert (BEL)	Lotto–Soudal	+ 0"
5	Benjamin Thomas (FRA)	Cofidis	+ 0"
6	Baptiste Planckaert (BEL)	Intermarché–Wanty–Gobert Matériaux	+ 0"
7	Damien Touzé (FRA)	AG2R Citroën Team	+ 8"
8	Julien Simon (FRA)	Team TotalEnergies	+ 8"
9	Andreas Kron (DEN)	Lotto–Soudal	+ 8"
10	Lorrenzo Manzin (FRA)	Team TotalEnergies	+ 8"

General classification after Stage 5
Rank	Rider	Team	Time
1	Philippe Gilbert (BEL)	Lotto–Soudal	20h 39' 33"
2	Oliver Naesen (BEL)	AG2R Citroën Team	+ 4"
3	Jake Stewart (GBR)	Groupama–FDJ	+ 5"
4	Benjamin Thomas (FRA)	Cofidis	+ 10"
5	Baptiste Planckaert (BEL)	Intermarché–Wanty–Gobert Matériaux	+ 10"
6	Julien Simon (FRA)	Team TotalEnergies	+ 14"
7	Romain Cardis (FRA)	St. Michel–Auber93	+ 16"
8	Lorrenzo Manzin (FRA)	Team TotalEnergies	+ 17"
9	Hugo Hofstetter (FRA)	Arkéa–Samsic	+ 18"
10	Damien Touzé (FRA)	AG2R Citroën Team	+ 18"

=== Stage 6 ===
8 May 2022 — Ardres to Dunkirk, 182.9 km (113.6 mi)

Stage 6 Result
Rank	Rider	Team	Time
1	Gerben Thijssen (BEL)	Intermarché–Wanty–Gobert Matériaux	4h 20' 53"
2	Hugo Hofstetter (FRA)	Arkéa–Samsic	+ 0"
3	Lorrenzo Manzin (FRA)	Team TotalEnergies	+ 0"
4	Lionel Taminiaux (BEL)	Alpecin–Fenix	+ 0"
5	Pierre Barbier (FRA)	B&B Hotels–KTM	+ 0"
6	Stanisław Aniołkowski (POL)	Bingoal Pauwels Sauces WB	+ 0"
7	Jason Tesson (FRA)	St. Michel–Auber93	+ 0"
8	Benjamin Thomas (FRA)	Cofidis	+ 0"
9	Niklas Märkl (GER)	Team DSM	+ 0"
10	Jake Stewart (GBR)	Groupama–FDJ	+ 0"

General classification after Stage 6
Rank	Rider	Team	Time
1	Philippe Gilbert (BEL)	Lotto–Soudal	25h 00' 26"
2	Oliver Naesen (BEL)	AG2R Citroën Team	+ 4"
3	Jake Stewart (GBR)	Groupama–FDJ	+ 5"
4	Benjamin Thomas (FRA)	Cofidis	+ 10"
5	Baptiste Planckaert (BEL)	Intermarché–Wanty–Gobert Matériaux	+ 10"
6	Hugo Hofstetter (FRA)	Arkéa–Samsic	+ 12"
7	Lorrenzo Manzin (FRA)	Team TotalEnergies	+ 13"
8	Julien Simon (FRA)	Team TotalEnergies	+ 14"
9	Romain Cardis (FRA)	St. Michel–Auber93	+ 16"
10	Damien Touzé (FRA)	AG2R Citroën Team	+ 18"

== Classification leadership table ==
Classification leadership by stage
Stage	Winner	General classification	Points classification	Mountains classification	Young rider classification	Team classification
1	Arvid de Kleijn	Arvid de Kleijn	Arvid de Kleijn	Milan Fretin	Jason Tesson	Groupama–FDJ
2	Jason Tesson	Jason Tesson	Jason Tesson	Alex Colman	Jason Tesson	Groupama–FDJ
3	Philippe Gilbert	Arvid de Kleijn	Jason Tesson	Alex Colman	Gerben Thijssen	Arkéa–Samsic
4	Lionel Taminiaux	Evaldas Šiškevičius	Jason Tesson	Alex Colman	Gerben Thijssen	Arkéa–Samsic
5	Gianni Vermeersch	Philippe Gilbert	Jason Tesson	Alex Colman	Jake Stewart	Lotto–Soudal
6	Gerben Thijssen	Philippe Gilbert	Jason Tesson	Alex Colman	Jake Stewart	Lotto–Soudal
Final		Philippe Gilbert	Jason Tesson	Alex Colman	Jake Stewart	Lotto–Soudal

== Classification standings ==
Legend
General classification	Denotes the winner of the general classification	Mountains classification	Denotes the winner of the mountains classification
Points classification	Denotes the winner of the points classification	Young rider classification	Denotes the winner of the young rider classification
Teams classification	Denotes the winner of the team classification		

=== General classification ===
Final general classification (1–10)
Rank	Rider	Team	Time
1	Philippe Gilbert (BEL)	Lotto–Soudal	25h 00' 26"
2	Oliver Naesen (BEL)	AG2R Citroën Team	+ 4"
3	Jake Stewart (GBR)	Groupama–FDJ	+ 5"
4	Benjamin Thomas (FRA)	Cofidis	+ 10"
5	Baptiste Planckaert (BEL)	Intermarché–Wanty–Gobert Matériaux	+ 10"
6	Hugo Hofstetter (FRA)	Arkéa–Samsic	+ 12"
7	Lorrenzo Manzin (FRA)	Team TotalEnergies	+ 13"
8	Julien Simon (FRA)	Team TotalEnergies	+ 14"
9	Romain Cardis (FRA)	St. Michel–Auber93	+ 16"
10	Damien Touzé (FRA)	AG2R Citroën Team	+ 18"

=== Points classification ===
Final points classification (1–10)
Rank	Rider	Team	Points
1	Jason Tesson (FRA)	St. Michel–Auber93	43
2	Gerben Thijssen (BEL)	Intermarché–Wanty–Gobert Matériaux	36
3	Arvid de Kleijn (NED)	Human Powered Health	28
4	Lionel Taminiaux (BEL)	Alpecin–Fenix	25
5	Hugo Hofstetter (FRA)	Arkéa–Samsic	24
6	Philippe Gilbert (BEL)	Lotto–Soudal	22
7	Lorrenzo Manzin (FRA)	Team TotalEnergies	21
8	Pierre Barbier (FRA)	B&B Hotels–KTM	20
9	Stanisław Aniołkowski (POL)	Bingoal Pauwels Sauces WB	20
10	Clément Russo (FRA)	Arkéa–Samsic	13

=== Mountains classification ===
Final mountains classification (1–10)
Rank	Rider	Team	Points
1	Alex Colman (BEL)	Sport Vlaanderen–Baloise	40
2	Michael Gogl (AUT)	Alpecin–Fenix	17
3	Louis Blouwe (BEL)	Bingoal Pauwels Sauces WB	11
4	Samuel Leroux (FRA)	Go Sport–Roubaix–Lille Métropole	10
5	Matthieu Ladagnous (FRA)	Groupama–FDJ	9
6	Milan Fretin (BEL)	Sport Vlaanderen–Baloise	8
7	Evaldas Šiškevičius (LTU)	Go Sport–Roubaix–Lille Métropole	6
8	Cyril Barthe (FRA)	Arkéa–Samsic	5
9	Robert Stannard (AUS)	Alpecin–Fenix	4
10	Gilles De Wilde (BEL)	Sport Vlaanderen–Baloise	4

=== Young rider classification ===
Final young rider classification (1–10)
Rank	Rider	Team	Time
1	Jake Stewart (GBR)	Groupama–FDJ	25h 00' 31"
2	Andreas Kron (DEN)	Lotto–Soudal	+ 13"
3	Hugo Page (FRA)	Intermarché–Wanty–Gobert Matériaux	+ 17"
4	Joris Delbove (FRA)	St. Michel–Auber93	+ 54"
5	Ward Vanhoof (BEL)	Sport Vlaanderen–Baloise	+ 1' 12"
6	Samuel Watson (GBR)	Groupama–FDJ	+ 1' 12"
7	Hugo Toumire (FRA)	Cofidis	+ 1' 32"
8	Paul Lapeira (FRA)	AG2R Citroën Team	+ 1' 38"
9	Laurence Pithie (NZL)	Groupama–FDJ	+ 1' 39"
10	Ruben Apers (BEL)	Sport Vlaanderen–Baloise	+ 1' 52"

=== Team classification ===
Final team classification (1–10)
Rank	Team	Time
1	Lotto–Soudal	75h 02' 34"
2	B&B Hotels–KTM	+ 16"
3	St. Michel–Auber93	+ 28"
4	Cofidis	+ 46"
5	Groupama–FDJ	+ 51"
6	AG2R Citroën Team	+ 55"
7	Intermarché–Wanty–Gobert Matériaux	+ 1' 13"
8	Alpecin–Fenix	+ 1' 39"
9	Go Sport–Roubaix–Lille Métropole	+ 2' 21"
10	Team TotalEnergies	+ 3' 51"
