= 2020 Cofidis season =

Cofidis
- 2020 season
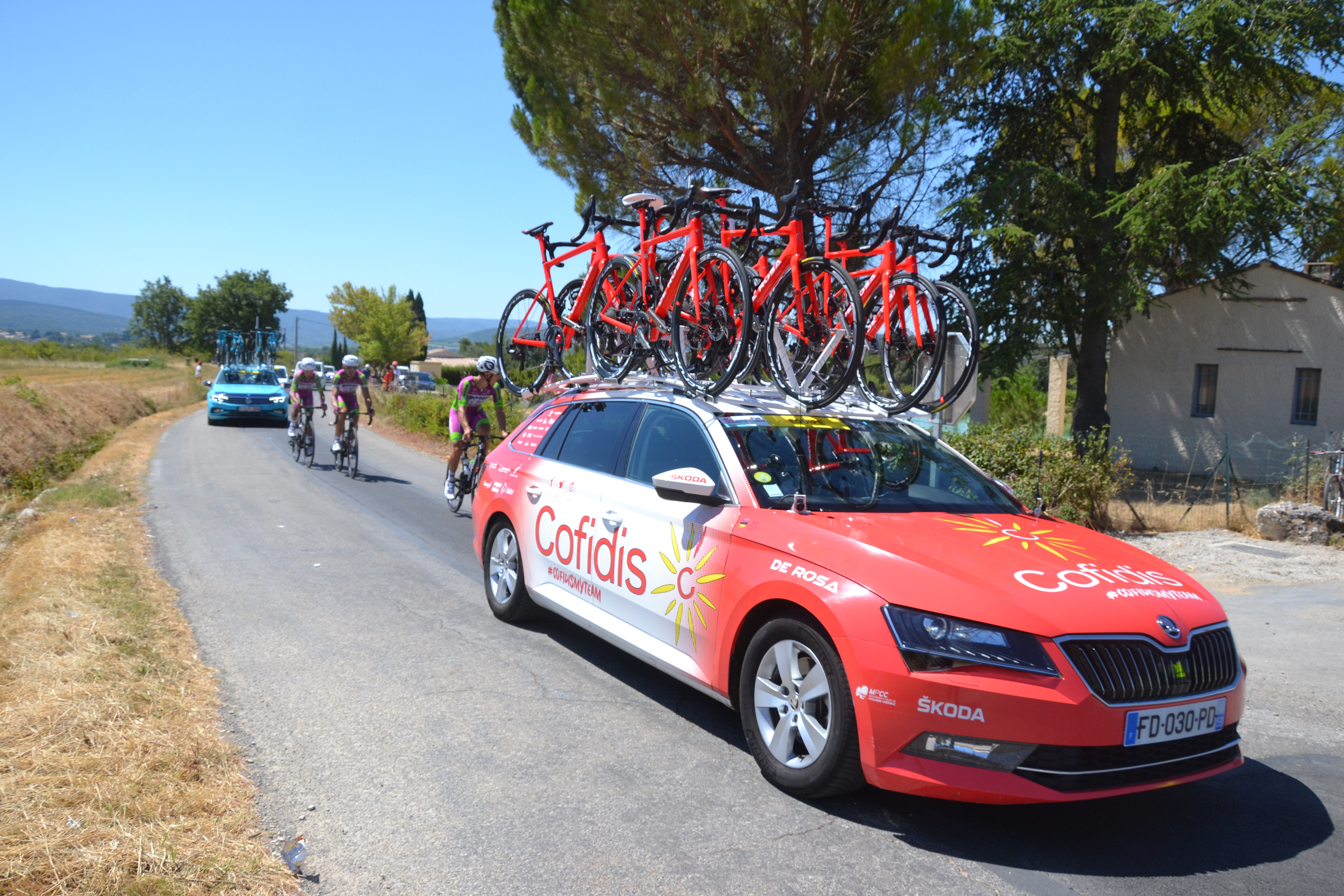
- UCI code: COF
- Status: UCI WorldTeam
- Manager: Yvon Sanquer
- Main sponsor(s): Cofidis
- Based: France
- Bicycles: De Rosa

Season victories
- Stage race stages: 2
- Most wins: Guillaume Martin (2)
- Jersey

The 2020 season for the Cofidis road cycling team began in January at the Tour Down Under. Cofidis stepped up to the UCI WorldTeam status this season after spending the last 10 years as a UCI Professional Continental team.

== Roster ==
As of 1 January 2020.

Rider	Date of birth
Piet Allegaert (BEL)	20 January 1995 (aged 24)
Fernando Barceló (ESP)	6 January 1996 (aged 23)
Natnael Berhane (ERI)	5 January 1991 (aged 28)
Dimitri Claeys (BEL)	18 June 1987 (aged 32)
Simone Consonni (ITA)	12 September 1994 (aged 25)
Nicolas Edet (FRA)	2 November 1987 (aged 32)
Eddy Finé (FRA)	20 November 1997 (aged 22)
Nathan Haas (AUS)	12 May 1989 (aged 30)
Jesper Hansen (DEN)	23 October 1990 (aged 29)
Jesús Herrada (ESP)	26 July 1990 (aged 29)
José Herrada (ESP)	1 October 1985 (aged 34)
Victor Lafay (FRA)	17 January 1996 (aged 23)
Christophe Laporte (FRA)	11 December 1992 (aged 27)
Mathias Le Turnier (FRA)	14 March 1995 (aged 24)

Rider	Date of birth
Cyril Lemoine (FRA)	3 March 1983 (aged 36)
Guillaume Martin (FRA)	9 June 1993 (aged 26)
Luis Ángel Maté (ESP)	23 March 1984 (aged 35)
Marco Mathis (GER)	7 April 1994 (aged 25)
Emmanuel Morin (FRA)	13 March 1995 (aged 24)
Anthony Perez (FRA)	22 April 1991 (aged 28)
Pierre-Luc Périchon (FRA)	4 January 1987 (aged 32)
Stéphane Rossetto (FRA)	6 April 1987 (aged 32)
Fabio Sabatini (ITA)	8 February 1985 (aged 34)
Damien Touzé (FRA)	7 July 1996 (aged 23)
Kenneth Vanbilsen (BEL)	1 June 1990 (aged 29)
Julien Vermote (BEL)	26 July 1989 (aged 30)
Attilio Viviani (ITA)	18 October 1996 (aged 23)
Elia Viviani (ITA)	7 February 1989 (aged 30)

Riders who joined the team for the 2020 season

Rider	2019 team
Piet Allegaert	Sport Vlaanderen–Baloise
Fernando Barceló	Euskadi–Murias
Simone Consonni	UAE Team Emirates
Eddy Finé	Neo Pro
Nathan Haas	Team Katusha–Alpecin
Guillaume Martin	Wanty–Gobert
Fabio Sabatini	Deceuninck–Quick-Step
Julien Vermote	Team Dimension Data
Attilio Viviani	Neo Pro
Elia Viviani	Deceuninck–Quick-Step

Riders who left the team during or after the 2019 season

Rider	2020 team
Darwin Atapuma	Colombia Tierra de Atletas–GW Bicicletas
Nacer Bouhanni	Arkéa–Samsic
Rayane Bouhanni	
Loïc Chetout	Retired
Filippo Fortin	Team Felbermayr–Simplon Wels
Hugo Hofstetter	Israel Start-Up Nation
Julien Simon	Total Direct Énergie
Geoffrey Soupe	Total Direct Énergie
Bert Van Lerberghe	Deceuninck–Quick-Step
Zico Waeytens	Retired

== Season victories ==
Date	Race	Competition	Rider	Country	Location
20 January	La Tropicale Amissa Bongo, Stage 1	UCI Africa Tour	Attilio Viviani (ITA)	Gabon	Ebolowa
2 February	Vuelta a San Juan, Mountains classification	UCI America Tour; UCI ProSeries	Guillaume Martin (FRA)	Argentina	
21 February	Tour des Alpes-Maritimes et du Var, Stage 1	UCI Europe Tour	Anthony Perez (FRA)	France	Grasse
14 March	Paris–Nice, Mountains classification	UCI World Tour	Nicolas Edet (FRA)	France	
8 November	Vuelta a España, Mountains classification	UCI World Tour	Guillaume Martin (FRA)	Spain	

== National, Continental and World champions ==
Date	Discipline	Jersey	Rider	Country	Location
