= 2020 UCI Africa Tour =

- Sixteenth edition of the UCI Africa Tour

Details
- Dates: 25 October 2019 – 1 March 2020
- Location: Africa
- Races: 4

Champions
- Individual champion: Daryl Impey (RSA) (Mitchelton–Scott)
- Teams' champion: ProTouch
- Nations' champion: South Africa

The 2020 UCI Africa Tour was the 16th season of the UCI Africa Tour. The season began on 25 October 2019 with the Tour du Faso and ended on 1 March 2020.

The points leader, based on the cumulative results of previous races, wears the UCI Africa Tour cycling jersey.

Throughout the season, points are awarded to the top finishers of stages within stage races and the final general classification standings of each of the stages races and one-day events. The quality and complexity of a race also determines how many points are awarded to the top finishers: the higher the UCI rating of a race, the more points are awarded. The UCI ratings from highest to lowest are as follows:

- Multi-day events: 2.HC, 2.1 and 2.2
- One-day events: 1.HC, 1.1 and 1.2

== Events ==
=== 2019 ===
Date	Race Name	Location	UCI Rating	Winner	Team	Ref.
25 October–3 November	Tour du Faso	Burkina Faso	2.2	Dário António (ANG)	BAI–Sicasal–Petro de Luanda	
10–17 November	Tour du Sénégal	Senegal	2.2	Didier Munyaneza (RWA)	Benediction–Excel Energy	

=== 2020 ===
Date	Race Name	Location	UCI Rating	Winner	Team	Ref.
20–26 January	La Tropicale Amissa Bongo	Gabon	2.1	Jordan Levasseur (FRA)	Natura4Ever–Roubaix–Lille Métropole	
23 February–1 March	Tour of Rwanda	Rwanda	2.1	Natnael Tesfatsion (ERI)	Eritrea (national team)	
