= 2023 Four Days of Dunkirk =

French cycling race

2023 UCI ProSeries

Race details
- Dates: 16–21 May 2023
- Stages: 6
- Distance: 926.5 km (575.7 mi)
- Winning time: 21h 14' 08"

Results
Jersey awarded to the overall winner	Winner	Romain Grégoire (FRA)	(Groupama–FDJ)
	Second	Kasper Asgreen (DEN)	(Soudal–Quick-Step)
	Third	Cees Bol (NED)	(Astana Qazaqstan Team)
Jersey awarded to the points classification winner	Points	Olav Kooij (NED)	(Team Jumbo–Visma)
Jersey awarded to the mountains classification winner	Mountains	Alex Colman (BEL)	(Team Flanders–Baloise)
Jersey awarded to the youth classification winner	Youth	Romain Grégoire (FRA)	(Groupama–FDJ)
	Team	(Netherlands) Team Jumbo–Visma	

The 2023 Four Days of Dunkirk (French: Quatre Jours de Dunkerque 2023) is a road cycling stage race that took place between 16 and 21 May 2023 in the French administrative region of Hauts-de-France. The race was rated as a category 2.Pro event on the 2023 UCI ProSeries calendar, and is the 67th edition of the Four Days of Dunkirk.

== Teams ==
8 of the 18 UCI WorldTeams, eight UCI ProTeams and four UCI Continental teams made up the 20 teams that participated in the race.

UCI WorldTeams

- AG2R Citroën Team
- Arkéa–Samsic
- Astana Qazaqstan Team
- Cofidis
- Groupama–FDJ
- Intermarché–Circus–Wanty
- Soudal–Quick-Step
- Team Jumbo–Visma

UCI ProTeams

- Bingoal WB
- Bolton Equities Black Spoke
- Equipo Kern Pharma
- Human Powered Health
- Lotto–Dstny
- Team Flanders–Baloise
- Team TotalEnergies
- Uno-X Pro Cycling Team

UCI Continental Teams

- Van Rysel–Roubaix–Lille Métropole
- Nice Métropole Côte d'Azur
- St. Michel–Mavic–Auber93
- CIC U Nantes Atlantique

== Route ==
Stage characteristics and winners
Stage	Date	Course	Distance	Type	Stage winner
1	16 May	Dunkirk to Abbeville	196.6 km (122.2 mi)	Flat stage	Olav Kooij (NED)
2	17 May	Compiègne to Laon	169.9 km (105.6 mi)	Flat stage	Romain Grégoire (FRA)
3	18 May	Saint-Quentin to Saint-Quentin	15.9 km (9.9 mi)	Individual time trial	Benjamin Thomas (FRA)
4	19 May	Maubeuge to Achicourt	173.8 km (108.0 mi)	Hilly stage	Olav Kooij (NED)
5	20 May	Roubaix to Cassel	187.7 km (116.6 mi)	Hilly stage	Per Strand Hagenes (NOR)
6	21 May	Avion to Dunkirk	182.6 km (113.5 mi)	Flat stage	Tim Merlier (BEL)
Total			926.5 km (575.7 mi)		

== Stages ==
=== Stage 1 ===
16 May 2023 – Dunkirk to Abbeville, 196.6 km (122.2 mi)

Stage 1 result
Rank	Rider	Team	Time
1	Olav Kooij (NED)	Team Jumbo–Visma	4h 31' 38"
2	Max Walscheid (GER)	Cofidis	+ 0"
3	Paul Penhoët (FRA)	Groupama–FDJ	+ 0"
4	Tim Merlier (BEL)	Soudal–Quick-Step	+ 0"
5	Daniel McLay (GBR)	Arkéa–Samsic	+ 0"
6	Matteo Malucelli (ITA)	Bingoal WB	+ 0"
7	Gerben Thijssen (BEL)	Intermarché–Circus–Wanty	+ 0"
8	Erlend Blikra (NOR)	Uno-X Pro Cycling Team	+ 0"
9	Stanisław Aniołkowski (POL)	Human Powered Health	+ 0"
10	Peter Sagan (SVK)	Team TotalEnergies	+ 0"

General classification after Stage 1
Rank	Rider	Team	Time
1	Olav Kooij (NED)	Team Jumbo–Visma	4h 31' 28"
2	Max Walscheid (GER)	Cofidis	+ 4"
3	Paul Penhoët (FRA)	Groupama–FDJ	+ 6"
4	Alex Colman (BEL)	Team Flanders–Baloise	+ 7"
5	Samuel Leroux (FRA)	Van Rysel–Roubaix–Lille Métropole	+ 7"
6	Mathis Le Berre (FRA)	Arkéa–Samsic	+ 7"
7	Anthony Turgis (FRA)	Team TotalEnergies	+ 7"
8	Peter Sagan (SVK)	Team TotalEnergies	+ 8"
9	Mark Stewart (GBR)	Bolton Equities Black Spoke	+ 8"
10	Jannik Steimle (GER)	Soudal–Quick-Step	+ 9"

=== Stage 2 ===
17 May 2023 – Compiègne to Laon, 169.9 km (105.6 mi)

Stage 2 result
Rank	Rider	Team	Time
1	Romain Grégoire (FRA)	Groupama–FDJ	3h 59' 05"
2	Ethan Vernon (GBR)	Soudal–Quick-Step	+ 0"
3	Benoît Cosnefroy (FRA)	AG2R Citroën Team	+ 0"
4	Peter Sagan (SVK)	Team TotalEnergies	+ 0"
5	Victor Lafay (FRA)	Cofidis	+ 0"
6	Benjamin Thomas (FRA)	Cofidis	+ 0"
7	Anthon Charmig (DEN)	Uno-X Pro Cycling Team	+ 0"
8	Paul Penhoët (FRA)	Groupama–FDJ	+ 0"
9	Greg Van Avermaet (BEL)	AG2R Citroën Team	+ 0"
10	Olav Kooij (NED)	Team Jumbo–Visma	+ 0"

General classification after Stage 2
Rank	Rider	Team	Time
1	Samuel Leroux (FRA)	Van Rysel–Roubaix–Lille Métropole	8h 30' 32"
2	Olav Kooij (NED)	Team Jumbo–Visma	+ 1"
3	Romain Grégoire (FRA)	Groupama–FDJ	+ 1"
4	Ethan Vernon (GBR)	Soudal–Quick-Step	+ 5"
5	Pier-André Côté (CAN)	Human Powered Health	+ 5"
6	Paul Penhoët (FRA)	Groupama–FDJ	+ 7"
7	Benoît Cosnefroy (FRA)	AG2R Citroën Team	+ 7"
8	Logan Currie (NZL)	Bolton Equities Black Spoke	+ 7"
9	Mathis Le Berre (FRA)	Arkéa–Samsic	+ 8"
10	Anthony Turgis (FRA)	Team TotalEnergies	+ 8"

=== Stage 3 ===
18 May 2023 – Saint-Quentin to Saint-Quentin, 15.9 km (9.9 mi)

Stage 3 result
Rank	Rider	Team	Time
1	Benjamin Thomas (FRA)	Cofidis	19' 21"
2	Niklas Larsen (DEN)	Uno-X Pro Cycling Team	+ 9"
3	Kasper Asgreen (DEN)	Soudal–Quick-Step	+ 14"
4	Ethan Vernon (GBR)	Soudal–Quick-Step	+ 26"
5	Cees Bol (NED)	Astana Qazaqstan Team	+ 26"
6	Lasse Norman Leth (DEN)	Uno-X Pro Cycling Team	+ 26"
7	Samuel Watson (GBR)	Groupama–FDJ	+ 29"
8	Mick van Dijke (NED)	Team Jumbo–Visma	+ 30"
9	Brent Van Moer (BEL)	Lotto–Dstny	+ 30"
10	Romain Grégoire (FRA)	Groupama–FDJ	+ 31"

General classification after Stage 3
Rank	Rider	Team	Time
1	Benjamin Thomas (FRA)	Cofidis	8h 50' 04"
2	Kasper Asgreen (DEN)	Soudal–Quick-Step	+ 14"
3	Ethan Vernon (GBR)	Soudal–Quick-Step	+ 20"
4	Romain Grégoire (FRA)	Groupama–FDJ	+ 21"
5	Cees Bol (NED)	Astana Qazaqstan Team	+ 26"
6	Lasse Norman Leth (DEN)	Uno-X Pro Cycling Team	+ 26"
7	Samuel Watson (GBR)	Groupama–FDJ	+ 29"
8	Brent Van Moer (BEL)	Lotto–Dstny	+ 30"
9	Olav Kooij (NED)	Team Jumbo–Visma	+ 31"
10	Peter Sagan (SVK)	Team TotalEnergies	+ 32"

=== Stage 4 ===
19 May 2023 – Maubeuge to Achicourt, 173.8 km (108.0 mi)

Stage 4 result
Rank	Rider	Team	Time
1	Olav Kooij (NED)	Team Jumbo–Visma	3h 44' 42"
2	Gerben Thijssen (BEL)	Intermarché–Circus–Wanty	+ 0"
3	Milan Fretin (BEL)	Team Flanders–Baloise	+ 0"
4	Erlend Blikra (NOR)	Uno-X Pro Cycling Team	+ 0"
5	Paul Penhoët (FRA)	Groupama–FDJ	+ 0"
6	Peter Sagan (SVK)	Team TotalEnergies	+ 0"
7	Lorrenzo Manzin (FRA)	Team TotalEnergies	+ 0"
8	Tim Merlier (BEL)	Soudal–Quick-Step	+ 0"
9	Rüdiger Selig (GER)	Lotto–Dstny	+ 0"
10	Alexis Renard (FRA)	Cofidis	+ 0"

General classification after Stage 4
Rank	Rider	Team	Time
1	Kasper Asgreen (DEN)	Soudal–Quick-Step	12h 35' 00"
2	Ethan Vernon (GBR)	Soudal–Quick-Step	+ 6"
3	Olav Kooij (NED)	Team Jumbo–Visma	+ 7"
4	Romain Grégoire (FRA)	Groupama–FDJ	+ 7"
5	Cees Bol (NED)	Astana Qazaqstan Team	+ 12"
6	Samuel Watson (GBR)	Groupama–FDJ	+ 15"
7	Brent Van Moer (BEL)	Lotto–Dstny	+ 16"
8	Peter Sagan (SVK)	Team TotalEnergies	+ 18"
9	Logan Currie (NZL)	Bolton Equities Black Spoke	+ 19"
10	Cédric Beullens (BEL)	Lotto–Dstny	+ 26"

=== Stage 5 ===
20 May 2023 – Roubaix to Cassel, 187.7 km (116.6 mi)

Stage 5 result
Rank	Rider	Team	Time
1	Per Strand Hagenes (NOR)	Team Jumbo–Visma	4h 42' 29"
2	Romain Grégoire (FRA)	Groupama–FDJ	+ 0"
3	Alexis Renard (FRA)	Cofidis	+ 5"
4	Brent Van Moer (BEL)	Lotto–Dstny	+ 5"
5	Greg Van Avermaet (BEL)	AG2R Citroën Team	+ 5"
6	Benjamin Thomas (FRA)	Cofidis	+ 8"
7	Cees Bol (NED)	Astana Qazaqstan Team	+ 8"
8	Olav Kooij (NED)	Team Jumbo–Visma	+ 11"
9	Cédric Beullens (BEL)	Lotto–Dstny	+ 14"
10	Laurent Pichon (FRA)	Arkéa–Samsic	+ 14"

General classification after Stage 5
Rank	Rider	Team	Time
1	Romain Grégoire (FRA)	Groupama–FDJ	17h 17' 30"
2	Kasper Asgreen (DEN)	Soudal–Quick-Step	+ 13"
3	Olav Kooij (NED)	Team Jumbo–Visma	+ 17"
4	Cees Bol (NED)	Astana Qazaqstan Team	+ 19"
5	Brent Van Moer (BEL)	Lotto–Dstny	+ 20"
6	Ethan Vernon (GBR)	Soudal–Quick-Step	+ 24"
7	Alexis Renard (FRA)	Cofidis	+ 27"
8	Per Strand Hagenes (NOR)	Team Jumbo–Visma	+ 28"
9	Peter Sagan (SVK)	Team TotalEnergies	+ 36"
10	Samuel Watson (GBR)	Groupama–FDJ	+ 39"

=== Stage 6 ===
21 May 2023 – Avion to Dunkirk, 182.6 km (113.5 mi)

Stage 6 result
Rank	Rider	Team	Time
1	Tim Merlier (BEL)	Soudal–Quick-Step	3h 56' 38"
2	Erlend Blikra (NOR)	Uno-X Pro Cycling Team	+ 0"
3	Cees Bol (NED)	Astana Qazaqstan Team	+ 0"
4	Olav Kooij (NED)	Team Jumbo–Visma	+ 0"
5	Max Walscheid (GER)	Cofidis	+ 0"
6	Rüdiger Selig (GER)	Lotto–Dstny	+ 0"
7	Milan Fretin (BEL)	Team Flanders–Baloise	+ 0"
8	Paul Penhoët (FRA)	Groupama–FDJ	+ 0"
9	Hugo Hofstetter (FRA)	Arkéa–Samsic	+ 0"
10	Peter Sagan (SVK)	Team TotalEnergies	+ 0"

General classification after Stage 6
Rank	Rider	Team	Time
1	Romain Grégoire (FRA)	Groupama–FDJ	21h 14' 08"
2	Kasper Asgreen (DEN)	Soudal–Quick-Step	+ 13"
3	Cees Bol (NED)	Astana Qazaqstan Team	+ 15"
4	Olav Kooij (NED)	Team Jumbo–Visma	+ 17"
5	Brent Van Moer (BEL)	Lotto–Dstny	+ 20"
6	Ethan Vernon (GBR)	Soudal–Quick-Step	+ 24"
7	Alexis Renard (FRA)	Cofidis	+ 27"
8	Peter Sagan (SVK)	Team TotalEnergies	+ 36"
9	Per Strand Hagenes (NOR)	Team Jumbo–Visma	+ 36"
10	Samuel Watson (GBR)	Groupama–FDJ	+ 39"

== Classification leadership table ==
Classification leadership by stage
Stage	Winner	General classification	Points classification	Mountains classification	Young rider classification	Team classification
1	Olav Kooij	Olav Kooij	Olav Kooij	Alex Colman	Olav Kooij	Groupama–FDJ
2	Romain Grégoire	Samuel Leroux	Olav Kooij	Tuur Dens	Olav Kooij	Groupama–FDJ
3	Benjamin Thomas	Benjamin Thomas	Benjamin Thomas	Tuur Dens	Ethan Vernon	Soudal–Quick-Step
4	Olav Kooij	Kasper Asgreen	Olav Kooij	Alex Colman	Ethan Vernon	Soudal–Quick-Step
5	Per Strand Hagenes	Romain Grégoire	Olav Kooij	Alex Colman	Romain Grégoire	Team Jumbo–Visma
6	Tim Merlier	Romain Grégoire	Olav Kooij	Alex Colman	Romain Grégoire	Team Jumbo–Visma
Final		Romain Grégoire	Olav Kooij	Alex Colman	Romain Grégoire	Team Jumbo–Visma

== Classification standings ==
Legend
Denotes the winner of the general classification	Denotes the winner of the mountains classification
Denotes the winner of the points classification	Denotes the winner of the young rider classification
Denotes the winner of the team classification	

=== General classification ===
Final general classification (1–10)
Rank	Rider	Team	Time
1	Romain Grégoire (FRA)	Groupama–FDJ	21h 14' 08"
2	Kasper Asgreen (DEN)	Soudal–Quick-Step	+ 13"
3	Cees Bol (NED)	Astana Qazaqstan Team	+ 15"
4	Olav Kooij (NED)	Team Jumbo–Visma	+ 17"
5	Brent Van Moer (BEL)	Lotto–Dstny	+ 20"
6	Ethan Vernon (GBR)	Soudal–Quick-Step	+ 24"
7	Alexis Renard (FRA)	Cofidis	+ 27"
8	Peter Sagan (SVK)	Team TotalEnergies	+ 36"
9	Per Strand Hagenes (NOR)	Team Jumbo–Visma	+ 36"
10	Samuel Watson (GBR)	Groupama–FDJ	+ 39"

=== Points classification ===
Final points classification (1–10)
Rank	Rider	Team	Points
1	Olav Kooij (NED)	Team Bahrain Victorious	41
2	Romain Grégoire (FRA)	Groupama–FDJ	28
3	Benjamin Thomas (FRA)	Cofidis	25
4	Tim Merlier (BEL)	Soudal–Quick-Step	25
5	Erlend Blikra (NOR)	Uno-X Pro Cycling Team	22
6	Paul Penhoët (FRA)	Groupama–FDJ	21
7	Cees Bol (NED)	Astana Qazaqstan Team	19
8	Ethan Vernon (GBR)	Soudal–Quick-Step	19
9	Max Walscheid (GER)	Cofidis	18
10	Samuel Leroux (FRA)	Van Rysel–Roubaix–Lille Métropole	17

=== Mountains classification ===
Final mountains classification (1–10)
Rank	Rider	Team	Points
1	Alex Colman (BEL)	Team Flanders–Baloise	39
2	Kenny Molly (BEL)	Van Rysel–Roubaix–Lille Métropole	23
3	Tuur Dens (BEL)	Team Flanders–Baloise	15
4	Cériel Desal (BEL)	Bingoal WB	13
5	Mathis Le Berre (FRA)	Arkéa–Samsic	7
6	Pier-André Côté (CAN)	Human Powered Health	4
7	Rait Ärm (EST)	Van Rysel–Roubaix–Lille Métropole	4
8	Geoffrey Soupe (FRA)	Team TotalEnergies	3
9	Kasper Asgreen (DEN)	Soudal–Quick-Step	2
10	Logan Currie (NZL)	Bolton Equities Black Spoke	2

=== Young rider classification ===
Final young rider classification (1–10)
Rank	Rider	Team	Time
1	Romain Grégoire (FRA)	Groupama–FDJ	21h 14' 08"
2	Olav Kooij (NED)	Team Jumbo–Visma	+ 17"
3	Ethan Vernon (GBR)	Soudal–Quick-Step	+ 24"
4	Alexis Renard (FRA)	Cofidis	+ 27"
5	Per Strand Hagenes (NOR)	Team Jumbo–Visma	+ 36"
6	Samuel Watson (GBR)	Groupama–FDJ	+ 39"
7	Logan Currie (NZL)	Bolton Equities Black Spoke	+ 41"
8	Paul Penhoët (FRA)	Groupama–FDJ	+ 1' 52"
9	Luca Van Boven (BEL)	Bingoal WB	+ 2' 07"
10	Antoine Raugel (FRA)	AG2R Citroën Team	+ 2' 38"

=== Team classification ===
Final team classification (1–10)
Rank	Team	Time
1	(Netherlands) Team Jumbo–Visma	63h 44' 41"
2	(Belgium) Lotto–Dstny	+ 0"
3	(Belgium) Soudal–Quick-Step	+ 1"
4	(France) Groupama–FDJ	+ 25"
5	(France) AG2R Citroën Team	+ 1' 14"
6	(France) Arkéa–Samsic	+ 3' 39"
7	(France) Team TotalEnergies	+ 3' 50"
8	(Belgium) Intermarché–Circus–Wanty	+ 8' 12"
9	(France) Cofidis	+ 9' 52"
10	(Norway) Uno-X Pro Cycling Team	+ 10' 00"
