= Jérémy Cabot =

French bicycle racer

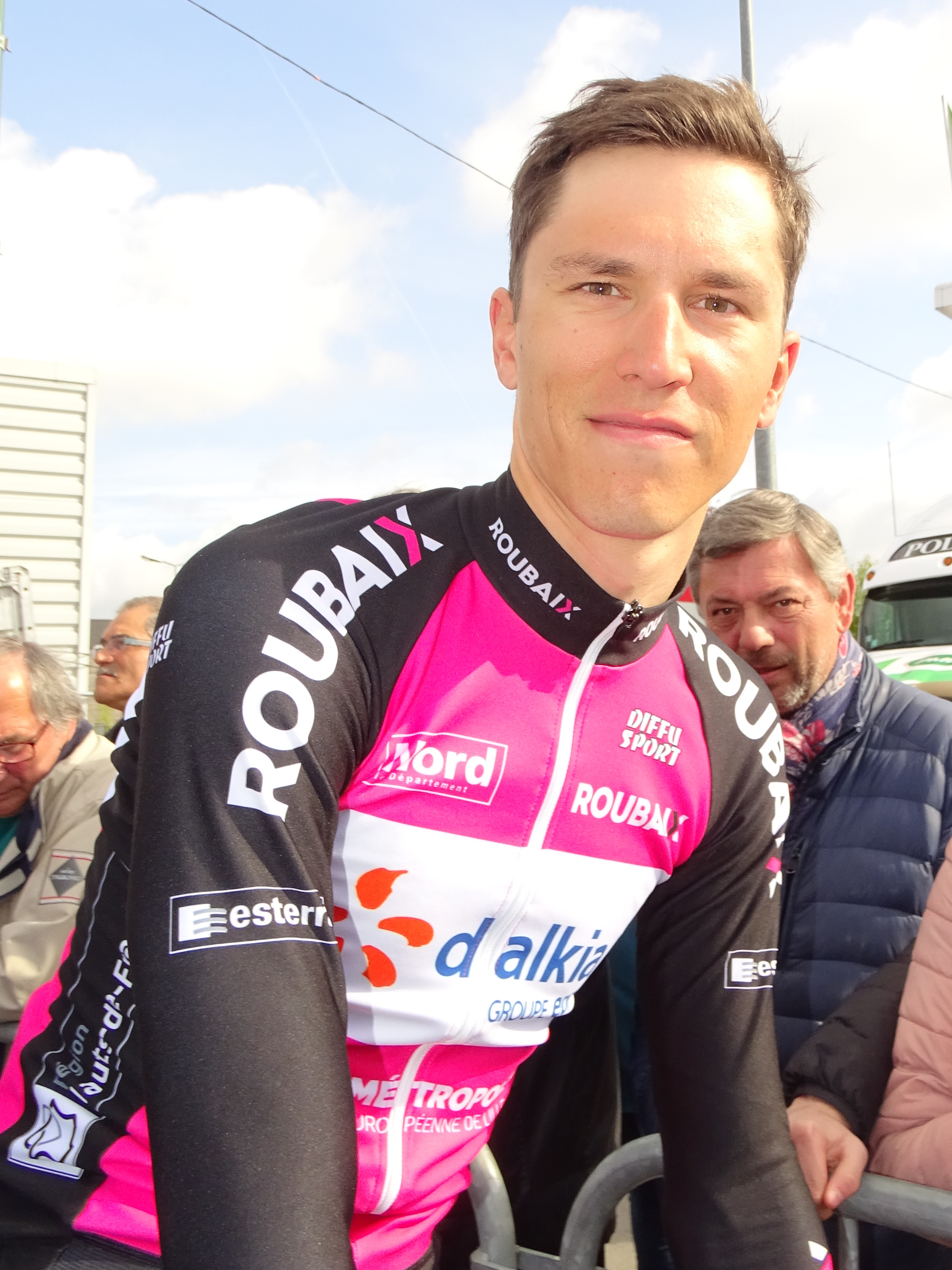
- Cabot in 2017.

Personal information
- Born: 24 July 1991 (age 35) Troyes, France
- Height: 1.92 m (6 ft 4 in)
- Weight: 76 kg (168 lb)

Cycling career
- Sport: Cycling
- Current team: Retired
- Discipline: Road
- Role: Rider

Amateur teams
- 2010–2015: VC Toucy
- 2016: SCO Dijon
- 2019: SCO Dijon

Professional teams
- 2017–2018: Roubaix–Lille Métropole
- 2020–2023: Total Direct Énergie
- 2024: St. Michel–Mavic–Auber93

Jérémy Cabot (French: [ʒeʁemi kabo]; born 24 July 1991 in Troyes) is a French former cyclist, who competed as a professional from 2017 to 2024.

== Major results ==
2016
8th Overall Boucles de la Mayenne
2018
1st Mountains classification, Tour du Limousin
8th Grand Prix de Wallonie
2019
1st Paris–Troyes
3rd Overall Tour du Jura
3rd Grand Prix des Marbriers
5th Grand Prix de la ville de Nogent-sur-Oise
2020
6th Overall La Tropicale Amissa Bongo
2021
5th Road race, National Road Championships
7th Mercan'Tour Classic Alpes-Maritimes
2023
5th Time trial, National Road Championships
7th Overall Tour Poitou-Charentes en Nouvelle-Aquitaine

=== Grand Tour general classification results timeline ===
Grand Tour	2021
Giro d'Italia	—
Tour de France	132
Vuelta a España	—

Legend
—	Did not compete
DNF	Did not finish
