= 2020 La Tropicale Amissa Bongo =

2020 UCI Africa Tour

Race details
- Dates: 20–26 January 2020
- Stages: 7
- Distance: 969.2 km (602.2 mi)
- Winning time: 22h 22' 23"

Results
Jersey awarded to the overall winner	Winner	Jordan Levasseur (FRA)	(Natura4Ever–Roubaix–Lille Métropole)
	Second	Natnael Tesfatsion (ERI)	(Eritrea)
	Third	Emmanuel Morin (FRA)	(Cofidis)
Jersey awarded to the points classification winner	Points	Biniam Girmay (ERI)	(Nippo–Delko–One Provence)
Jersey awarded to the mountains classification winner	Mountains	Dawit Yemane (ERI)	(Eritrea)
Jersey awarded to the youth classification winner	Youth	Natnael Tesfatsion (ERI)	(Eritrea)
Jersey awarded to the sprints classification winner	Sprints	Jordan Levasseur (FRA)	(Natura4Ever–Roubaix–Lille Métropole)
Jersey awarded to the combativity classification winner	Combativity	Joseph Areruya (RWA)	(Rwanda)
Jersey awarded to the team classification winner	Team	Rwanda	

The 2020 La Tropicale Amissa Bongo was a road cycling stage race that took place in Gabon and Cameroon between 20 and 26 January 2020. The race was rated as a 2.1 event as part of the 2020 UCI Africa Tour, and was the 15th edition of La Tropicale Amissa Bongo.

== Teams ==
Fifteen teams were invited to the race, of which one was a UCI WorldTeam, two were UCI Professional Continental teams, four were UCI Continental teams, and eight were national teams. Each team entered six riders into the race for a total of 90 riders, of which 72 finished the race.

UCI WorldTeams

- Cofidis

UCI Professional Continental Teams

- Nippo–Delko–One Provence
- Total Direct Énergie

UCI Continental Teams

- BAI–Sicasal–Petro de Luanda
- Dukla Banská Bystrica
- Natura4Ever–Roubaix–Lille Métropole
- ProTouch

National Teams

- Algeria
- Burkina Faso
- Cameroon
- Eritrea
- Gabon
- Ivory Coast
- Morocco
- Rwanda

== Route ==
Stage characteristics and winners
Stage	Date	Course	Distance	Type	Stage winner
1	January 20	Bitam to Ebolowa (Cameroon)	149 km (93 mi)	Flat stage	Attilio Viviani (ITA)
2	January 21	Bitam to Oyem	107 km (66 mi)	Flat stage	Natnael Tesfatsion (ERI)
3	January 22	Mitzic to Ndjolé	186 km (116 mi)	Hilly stage	Biniam Girmay (ERI)
4	January 23	Lambaréné to Mouila	190 km (120 mi)	Flat stage	Clovis Kamzong (CMR)
5	January 24	Lambaréné to Bifoun	82 km (51 mi)	Flat stage	Youcef Reguigui (ALG)
6	January 25	Port-Gentil to Port-Gentil	127.2 km (79.0 mi)	Flat stage	Biniam Girmay (ERI)
7	January 26	Nkok to Libreville	128 km (80 mi)	Flat stage	Lorrenzo Manzin (FRA)
Total		969.2 km (602.2 mi)			

== Stages ==
=== Stage 1 ===
20 January 2020 — Bitam to Ebolowa (Cameroon), 149 km (93 mi)

Stage 1 Result
Rank	Rider	Team	Time
1	Attilio Viviani (ITA)	Cofidis	3h 33' 57"
2	Lorrenzo Manzin (FRA)	Total Direct Énergie	+ 0"
3	Biniam Girmay (ERI)	Nippo–Delko–One Provence	+ 0"
4	Damien Gaudin (FRA)	Total Direct Énergie	+ 0"
5	Henok Mulubrhan (ERI)	Eritrea	+ 0"
6	Jérémy Cabot (FRA)	Total Direct Énergie	+ 0"
7	Jordan Levasseur (FRA)	Natura4Ever–Roubaix–Lille Métropole	+ 0"
8	Natnael Tesfatsion (ERI)	Eritrea	+ 0"
9	Youcef Reguigui (ALG)	Algeria	+ 0"
10	Riccardo Minali (ITA)	Nippo–Delko–One Provence	+ 0"

General classification after Stage 1
Rank	Rider	Team	Time
1	Attilio Viviani (ITA)	Cofidis	3h 33' 47"
2	Dawit Yemane (ERI)	Eritrea	+ 3"
3	Lorrenzo Manzin (FRA)	Total Direct Énergie	+ 4"
4	Adil El Arbaoui (MAR)	Morocco	+ 4"
5	Moise Mugisha (RWA)	Rwanda	+ 5"
6	Biniam Girmay (ERI)	Nippo–Delko–One Provence	+ 6"
7	Damien Gaudin (FRA)	Total Direct Énergie	+ 10"
8	Henok Mulubrhan (ERI)	Eritrea	+ 10"
9	Jérémy Cabot (FRA)	Total Direct Énergie	+ 10"
10	Jordan Levasseur (FRA)	Natura4Ever–Roubaix–Lille Métropole	+ 10"

=== Stage 2 ===
21 January 2020 — Bitam to Oyem, 107 km (66 mi)

Stage 2 Result
Rank	Rider	Team	Time
1	Natnael Tesfatsion (ERI)	Eritrea	2h 30' 42"
2	Youcef Reguigui (ALG)	Algeria	+ 0"
3	Henok Mulubrhan (ERI)	Eritrea	+ 0"
4	Emmanuel Morin (FRA)	Cofidis	+ 0"
5	Ramūnas Navardauskas (LTU)	Nippo–Delko–One Provence	+ 0"
6	Jordan Levasseur (FRA)	Natura4Ever–Roubaix–Lille Métropole	+ 0"
7	Jérémy Cabot (FRA)	Total Direct Énergie	+ 0"
8	Julien Antomarchi (FRA)	Natura4Ever–Roubaix–Lille Métropole	+ 0"
9	Hendrik Kruger (RSA)	ProTouch	+ 0"
10	Didier Munyaneza (RWA)	Rwanda	+ 0"

General classification after Stage 2
Rank	Rider	Team	Time
1	Natnael Tesfatsion (ERI)	Eritrea	6h 04' 28"
2	Dawit Yemane (ERI)	Eritrea	+ 0"
3	Youcef Reguigui (ALG)	Algeria	+ 5"
4	Henok Mulubrhan (ERI)	Eritrea	+ 7"
5	Emmanuel Morin (FRA)	Cofidis	+ 9"
6	Carlos Oyarzún (CHI)	BAI–Sicasal–Petro de Luanda	+ 10"
7	Jordan Levasseur (FRA)	Natura4Ever–Roubaix–Lille Métropole	+ 11"
8	Jérémy Cabot (FRA)	Total Direct Énergie	+ 11"
9	Damien Gaudin (FRA)	Total Direct Énergie	+ 11"
10	Azzedine Lagab (ALG)	Algeria	+ 11"

=== Stage 3 ===
22 January 2020 — Mitzic to Ndjolé, 186 km (116 mi)

Stage 3 Result
Rank	Rider	Team	Time
1	Biniam Girmay (ERI)	Nippo–Delko–One Provence	4h 16' 28"
2	Jordan Levasseur (FRA)	Natura4Ever–Roubaix–Lille Métropole	+ 2"
3	Emmanuel Morin (FRA)	Cofidis	+ 4"
4	Attilio Viviani (ITA)	Cofidis	+ 4"
5	Henok Mulubrhan (ERI)	Eritrea	+ 4"
6	Natnael Tesfatsion (ERI)	Eritrea	+ 4"
7	Carlos Oyarzún (CHI)	BAI–Sicasal–Petro de Luanda	+ 4"
8	Jérémy Cabot (FRA)	Total Direct Énergie	+ 4"
9	Victor Lafay (FRA)	Cofidis	+ 4"
10	Azzedine Lagab (ALG)	Algeria	+ 9"

General classification after Stage 3
Rank	Rider	Team	Time
1	Natnael Tesfatsion (ERI)	Eritrea	10h 20' 56"
2	Jordan Levasseur (FRA)	Natura4Ever–Roubaix–Lille Métropole	+ 4"
3	Emmanuel Morin (FRA)	Cofidis	+ 9"
4	Henok Mulubrhan (ERI)	Eritrea	+ 10"
5	Carlos Oyarzún (CHI)	BAI–Sicasal–Petro de Luanda	+ 14"
6	Jérémy Cabot (FRA)	Total Direct Énergie	+ 15"
7	Victor Lafay (FRA)	Cofidis	+ 15"
8	Youcef Reguigui (ALG)	Algeria	+ 18"
9	Dawit Yemane (ERI)	Eritrea	+ 19"
10	Azzedine Lagab (ALG)	Algeria	+ 20"

=== Stage 4 ===
23 January 2020 — Lambaréné to Mouila, 190 km (120 mi)

Stage 4 Result
Rank	Rider	Team	Time
1	Clovis Kamzong (CMR)	Cameroon	4h 34' 42"
2	Joseph Areruya (RWA)	Rwanda	+ 0"
3	El Houcaine Sabbahi (MAR)	Morocco	+ 7"
4	Abdoul Aziz Nikiéma (BUR)	Burkina Faso	+ 16"
5	Biniam Girmay (ERI)	Nippo–Delko–One Provence	+ 4' 13"
6	Riccardo Minali (ITA)	Nippo–Delko–One Provence	+ 4' 13"
7	Attilio Viviani (ITA)	Cofidis	+ 4' 13"
8	Youcef Reguigui (ALG)	Algeria	+ 4' 13"
9	Henok Mulubrhan (ERI)	Eritrea	+ 4' 13"
10	Jordan Levasseur (FRA)	Natura4Ever–Roubaix–Lille Métropole	+ 4' 13"

General classification after Stage 4
Rank	Rider	Team	Time
1	Natnael Tesfatsion (ERI)	Eritrea	14h 59' 51"
2	Jordan Levasseur (FRA)	Natura4Ever–Roubaix–Lille Métropole	+ 4"
3	Emmanuel Morin (FRA)	Cofidis	+ 9"
4	Henok Mulubrhan (ERI)	Eritrea	+ 10"
5	Carlos Oyarzún (CHI)	BAI–Sicasal–Petro de Luanda	+ 14"
6	Jérémy Cabot (FRA)	Total Direct Énergie	+ 15"
7	Victor Lafay (FRA)	Cofidis	+ 15"
8	Youcef Reguigui (ALG)	Algeria	+ 18"
9	Dawit Yemane (ERI)	Eritrea	+ 19"
10	Azzedine Lagab (ALG)	Algeria	+ 20"

=== Stage 5 ===
24 January 2020 — Lambaréné to Bifoun, 82 km (51 mi)

Stage 5 Result
Rank	Rider	Team	Time
1	Youcef Reguigui (ALG)	Algeria	1h 45' 01"
2	Yacine Hamza (ALG)	Algeria	+ 0"
3	Emmanuel Morin (FRA)	Cofidis	+ 0"
4	Riccardo Minali (ITA)	Nippo–Delko–One Provence	+ 0"
5	Attilio Viviani (ITA)	Cofidis	+ 0"
6	Biniam Girmay (ERI)	Nippo–Delko–One Provence	+ 0"
7	Jérémy Cabot (FRA)	Total Direct Énergie	+ 0"
8	Bruno Araújo (ANG)	BAI–Sicasal–Petro de Luanda	+ 0"
9	Natnael Tesfatsion (ERI)	Eritrea	+ 0"
10	Paul Daumont (BUR)	Burkina Faso	+ 0"

General classification after Stage 5
Rank	Rider	Team	Time
1	Natnael Tesfatsion (ERI)	Eritrea	16h 44' 50"
2	Jordan Levasseur (FRA)	Natura4Ever–Roubaix–Lille Métropole	+ 2"
3	Emmanuel Morin (FRA)	Cofidis	+ 6"
4	Youcef Reguigui (ALG)	Algeria	+ 10"
5	Henok Mulubrhan (ERI)	Eritrea	+ 12"
6	Jérémy Cabot (FRA)	Total Direct Énergie	+ 14"
7	Carlos Oyarzún (CHI)	BAI–Sicasal–Petro de Luanda	+ 14"
8	Victor Lafay (FRA)	Cofidis	+ 17"
9	Dawit Yemane (ERI)	Eritrea	+ 21"
10	Azzedine Lagab (ALG)	Algeria	+ 22"

=== Stage 6 ===
25 January 2020 — Port-Gentil to Port-Gentil, 127.2 km (79.0 mi)

Stage 6 Result
Rank	Rider	Team	Time
1	Biniam Girmay (ERI)	Nippo–Delko–One Provence	2h 47' 39"
2	Yacine Hamza (ALG)	Algeria	+ 0"
3	Attilio Viviani (ITA)	Cofidis	+ 0"
4	Lorrenzo Manzin (FRA)	Total Direct Énergie	+ 0"
5	Emmanuel Morin (FRA)	Cofidis	+ 0"
6	Youcef Reguigui (ALG)	Algeria	+ 0"
7	Natnael Tesfatsion (ERI)	Eritrea	+ 0"
8	Jordan Levasseur (FRA)	Natura4Ever–Roubaix–Lille Métropole	+ 0"
9	Gustav Basson (RSA)	ProTouch	+ 0"
10	Jérémy Cabot (FRA)	Total Direct Énergie	+ 0"

General classification after Stage 6
Rank	Rider	Team	Time
1	Natnael Tesfatsion (ERI)	Eritrea	19h 32' 29"
2	Jordan Levasseur (FRA)	Natura4Ever–Roubaix–Lille Métropole	+ 1"
3	Emmanuel Morin (FRA)	Cofidis	+ 4"
4	Henok Mulubrhan (ERI)	Eritrea	+ 9"
5	Youcef Reguigui (ALG)	Algeria	+ 10"
6	Jérémy Cabot (FRA)	Total Direct Énergie	+ 14"
7	Carlos Oyarzún (CHI)	BAI–Sicasal–Petro de Luanda	+ 14"
8	Victor Lafay (FRA)	Cofidis	+ 17"
9	Damien Gaudin (FRA)	Total Direct Énergie	+ 20"
10	Dawit Yemane (ERI)	Eritrea	+ 21"

=== Stage 7 ===
26 January 2020 — Nkok to Libreville, 128 km (80 mi)

Stage 7 Result
Rank	Rider	Team	Time
1	Lorrenzo Manzin (FRA)	Total Direct Énergie	2h 49' 56"
2	Youcef Reguigui (ALG)	Algeria	+ 0"
3	Riccardo Minali (ITA)	Nippo–Delko–One Provence	+ 0"
4	Emmanuel Morin (FRA)	Cofidis	+ 0"
5	Jayde Julius (RSA)	ProTouch	+ 0"
6	Biniam Girmay (ERI)	Nippo–Delko–One Provence	+ 0"
7	Natnael Tesfatsion (ERI)	Eritrea	+ 0"
8	Henok Mulubrhan (ERI)	Eritrea	+ 0"
9	Gustav Basson (RSA)	ProTouch	+ 0"
10	Jordan Levasseur (FRA)	Natura4Ever–Roubaix–Lille Métropole	+ 0"

General classification after Stage 7
Rank	Rider	Team	Time
1	Jordan Levasseur (FRA)	Natura4Ever–Roubaix–Lille Métropole	22h 22' 23"
2	Natnael Tesfatsion (ERI)	Eritrea	+ 1"
3	Emmanuel Morin (FRA)	Cofidis	+ 4"
4	Youcef Reguigui (ALG)	Algeria	+ 6"
5	Henok Mulubrhan (ERI)	Eritrea	+ 11"
6	Jérémy Cabot (FRA)	Total Direct Énergie	+ 16"
7	Carlos Oyarzún (CHI)	BAI–Sicasal–Petro de Luanda	+ 16"
8	Damien Gaudin (FRA)	Total Direct Énergie	+ 20"
9	Azzedine Lagab (ALG)	Algeria	+ 24"
10	Ramūnas Navardauskas (LTU)	Nippo–Delko–One Provence	+ 27"

== Classification leadership table ==
Classification leadership by stage
Stage	Winner	General classification	Points classification	Mountains classification	Young rider classification	Sprints classification	Team classification
1	Attilio Viviani	Attilio Viviani	Attilio Viviani	Dawit Yemane	Attilio Viviani	Dawit Yemane	Total Direct Énergie
2	Natnael Tesfatsion	Natnael Tesfatsion	Henok Mulubrhan	Dawit Yemane	Natnael Tesfatsion	Dawit Yemane	Eritrea
3	Biniam Girmay	Natnael Tesfatsion	Henok Mulubrhan	Dawit Yemane	Natnael Tesfatsion	Dawit Yemane	Eritrea
4	Clovis Kamzong	Natnael Tesfatsion	Henok Mulubrhan	Dawit Yemane	Natnael Tesfatsion	Dawit Yemane	Rwanda
5	Youcef Reguigui	Natnael Tesfatsion	Biniam Girmay	Dawit Yemane	Natnael Tesfatsion	Dawit Yemane	Rwanda
6	Biniam Girmay	Natnael Tesfatsion	Biniam Girmay	Dawit Yemane	Natnael Tesfatsion	Dawit Yemane	Rwanda
7	Lorrenzo Manzin	Jordan Levasseur	Biniam Girmay	Dawit Yemane	Natnael Tesfatsion	Jordan Levasseur	Rwanda
Final		Jordan Levasseur	Biniam Girmay	Dawit Yemane	Natnael Tesfatsion	Jordan Levasseur	Rwanda

== Final classification standings ==
Legend
Denotes the winner of the general classification	Denotes the winner of the young rider classification
Denotes the winner of the points classification	Denotes the winner of the sprints classification
Denotes the winner of the mountains classification	Denotes the winner of the teams classification

=== General classification ===
Final general classification (1–10)
Rank	Rider	Team	Time
1	Jordan Levasseur (FRA)	Natura4Ever–Roubaix–Lille Métropole	22h 22' 23"
2	Natnael Tesfatsion (ERI)	Eritrea	+ 1"
3	Emmanuel Morin (FRA)	Cofidis	+ 4"
4	Youcef Reguigui (ALG)	Algeria	+ 6"
5	Henok Mulubrhan (ERI)	Eritrea	+ 11"
6	Jérémy Cabot (FRA)	Total Direct Énergie	+ 16"
7	Carlos Oyarzún (CHI)	BAI–Sicasal–Petro de Luanda	+ 16"
8	Damien Gaudin (FRA)	Total Direct Énergie	+ 20"
9	Azzedine Lagab (ALG)	Algeria	+ 24"
10	Ramūnas Navardauskas (LTU)	Nippo–Delko–One Provence	+ 27"

=== Points classification ===
Final points classification (1–10)
Rank	Rider	Team	Points
1	Biniam Girmay (ERI)	Nippo–Delko–One Provence	144
2	Youcef Reguigui (ALG)	Algeria	140
3	Emmanuel Morin (FRA)	Cofidis	134
4	Attilio Viviani (ITA)	Cofidis	116
5	Natnael Tesfatsion (ERI)	Eritrea	115
6	Jordan Levasseur (FRA)	Natura4Ever–Roubaix–Lille Métropole	110
7	Jérémy Cabot (FRA)	Total Direct Énergie	98
8	Henok Mulubrhan (ERI)	Eritrea	97
9	Lorrenzo Manzin (FRA)	Total Direct Énergie	80
10	Riccardo Minali (ITA)	Nippo–Delko–One Provence	78

=== Mountains classification ===
Final mountains classification (1–10)
Rank	Rider	Team	Points
1	Dawit Yemane (ERI)	Eritrea	17
2	Paul Daumont (BUR)	Burkina Faso	11
3	Oussama Khafi (MAR)	Morocco	8
4	Abdoul Aziz Nikiéma (BUR)	Burkina Faso	8
5	Ramūnas Navardauskas (LTU)	Nippo–Delko–One Provence	6
6	Mekseb Debesay (ERI)	Eritrea	6
7	Victor Lafay (FRA)	Cofidis	5
8	Mohcine El Kouraji (MAR)	Morocco	5
9	Pierre-Luc Périchon (FRA)	Cofidis	5
10	Clovis Kamzong (CMR)	Cameroon	5

=== Young rider classification ===
Final young rider classification (1–10)
Rank	Rider	Team	Time
1	Natnael Tesfatsion (ERI)	Eritrea	22h 22' 24"
2	Henok Mulubrhan (ERI)	Eritrea	+ 10"
3	Dawit Yemane (ERI)	Eritrea	+ 52"
4	Renus Byiza Uhiriwe (RWA)	Rwanda	+ 1' 39"
5	Victor Lafay (FRA)	Cofidis	+ 2' 44"
6	Mohcine El Kouraji (MAR)	Morocco	+ 2' 47"
7	Yacine Hamza (ALG)	Algeria	+ 3' 40"
8	Oussama Khafi (MAR)	Morocco	+ 4' 53"
9	Eddy Finé (FRA)	Cofidis	+ 5' 03"
10	Lukáš Kubiš (SVK)	Dukla Banská Bystrica	+ 14' 20"

=== Sprints classification ===
Final sprints classification (1–10)
Rank	Rider	Team	Points
1	Jordan Levasseur (FRA)	Natura4Ever–Roubaix–Lille Métropole	11
2	Dawit Yemane (ERI)	Eritrea	11
3	El Houcaine Sabbahi (MAR)	Morocco	9
4	Damien Gaudin (FRA)	Total Direct Énergie	8
5	Natnael Tesfatsion (ERI)	Eritrea	8
6	Emmanuel Morin (FRA)	Cofidis	7
7	Mekseb Debesay (ERI)	Eritrea	6
8	Adil El Arbaoui (MAR)	Morocco	6
9	Henok Mulubrhan (ERI)	Eritrea	4
10	Joseph Areruya (RWA)	Rwanda	4

=== Teams classification ===
Final teams classification (1–10)
Rank	Team	Time
1	Rwanda	67h 06' 26"
2	Eritrea	+ 2' 25"
3	Cofidis	+ 4' 37"
4	Algeria	+ 5' 28"
5	ProTouch	+ 6' 38"
6	Natura4Ever–Roubaix–Lille Métropole	+ 9' 25"
7	Nippo–Delko–One Provence	+ 18' 15"
8	Total Direct Énergie	+ 18' 23"
9	Morocco	+ 22' 41"
10	BAI–Sicasal–Petro de Luanda	+ 23' 05"
