= 2017 Grand Prix de Fourmies =

2017 UCI Europe Tour

Race details
- Dates: 3 September 2017
- Stages: 1
- Distance: 205 km (127.4 mi)
- Winning time: 4h 22' 29"

Results
	Winner	Nacer Bouhanni (FRA)
	Second	Marc Sarreau (FRA)
	Third	Rüdiger Selig (GER)

The 2017 Grand Prix de Fourmies was the 85th edition of the Grand Prix de Fourmies road cycling one day race. It was held on 3 September 2017 as part of UCI Europe Tour in category 1.HC.

== Teams ==
Twenty-two teams entered the race. Each team had a maximum of eight riders:

UCI WorldTeams

- Quick-Step Floors
- Bora–Hansgrohe
- UAE Team Emirates
- FDJ
- Trek–Segafredo
- AG2R La Mondiale
- Astana

UCI Professional Continental teams

- Cofidis
- Wilier Triestina–Selle Italia
- Gazprom–RusVelo
- Delko–Marseille Provence KTM
- Roompot–Nederlandse Loterij
- Wanty–Groupe Gobert
- Direct Énergie
- Nippo–Vini Fantini
- Sport Vlaanderen–Baloise
- WB Veranclassic Aqua Protect
- Vérandas Willems–Crelan
- Fortuneo–Oscaro

UCI Continental teams

- Roubaix–Lille Métropole
- Armée de Terre
- HP BTP–Auber93

== Result ==
Final general classification

Rank	Rider	Team	Time
1	Nacer Bouhanni (FRA)	Cofidis	4h 22' 29"
2	Marc Sarreau (FRA)	FDJ	s.t.
3	Rüdiger Selig (GER)	Bora–Hansgrohe	s.t.
4	David Menut (FRA)	HP BTP–Auber93	s.t.
5	Simone Consonni (ITA)	UAE Team Emirates	s.t.
6	Justin Jules (FRA)	WB Veranclassic Aqua Protect	s.t.
7	Jordan Levasseur (FRA)	Armée de Terre	s.t.
8	Jarl Salomein (BEL)	Sport Vlaanderen–Baloise	s.t.
9	Laurent Pichon (FRA)	Fortuneo–Oscaro	s.t.
10	John Degenkolb (GER)	Trek–Segafredo	s.t.
