= Igor Silva =

Igor Silva may refer to:

- Igor Silva (footballer) (born 1996), Brazilian footballer
- Igor Silva (cyclist) (born 1984), Angolan cyclist
