= Julien Laidoun =

French road cyclist (born 1980)

Personal information
- Born: 24 January 1980 (age 46) Reims, France

Cycling career
- Sport: Cycling
- Current team: Pédale Suippase
- Discipline: Road
- Role: Rider

Amateur teams
- 1999: Cyclo 51
- 2000–2001: CC Étupes
- 2001: AG2R Prévoyance (stagiaire)
- 2002: Charvieu–Chavagneux IC
- 2006: UCVA Troyes
- 2008: ASL Hauteville
- 2009–2011: VS Chartrain
- 2012: UVC Charleville-Mézières
- 2014–: Pédale Suippase
- 2018: ASPTT Nancy
- 2019: Team France Défense

Professional teams
- 2002–2004: AG2R Prévoyance
- 2005: MrBookmaker.com–SportsTech
- 2007: Pictoflex–Thompson–Hyundai
- 2020: BAI–Sicasal–Petro de Luanda

Julien Laidoun (born 24 January 1980) is a French road cyclist, who currently rides for amateur team Pédale Suippase. He was professional from 2002 to 2005, in 2007 and again in 2020. He most notably rode in the 2004 Vuelta a España and finished third in the 2003 Tour du Finistère.

== Major results ==
1998
1st Classique des Alpes juniors
2002
7th Overall Le Triptyque des Monts et Châteaux

1st Stage 3

2003
3rd Tour du Finistère
