= 2024 Étoile de Bessèges =

2024 UCI Europe Tour

Race details
- Dates: 31 January–4 February 2024
- Stages: 5
- Distance: 654.415 km (406.6 mi)
- Winning time: 11h 24' 34"

Results
| Jersey awarded to the overall winner | Winner | Mads Pedersen (DEN) | (Lidl–Trek) |
| | Second | Kévin Vauquelin (FRA) | (Arkéa–B&B Hotels) |
| | Third | Alberto Bettiol (ITA) | (EF Education–EasyPost) |
| Jersey awarded to the points classification winner | Points | Mads Pedersen (DEN) | (Lidl–Trek) |
| Jersey awarded to the mountains classification winner | Mountains | Jonas Abrahamsen (NOR) | (Uno-X Mobility) |
| Jersey awarded to the youth classification winner | Youth | Kévin Vauquelin (FRA) | (Arkéa–B&B Hotels) |
| | Team | (France) Decathlon–AG2R La Mondiale | |

The 2024 Étoile de Bessèges – Tour du Gard (transl. Star of Bessèges – Tour of Gard) was a road cycling stage race that took place between 31 January and 4 February 2024 almost entirely within the French department of Gard. The race was rated as a category 2.1 event on the 2024 UCI Europe Tour calendar and was the 54th edition of the Étoile de Bessèges.

== Teams ==
Seven of the 18 UCI WorldTeams, eight UCI ProTeams, and four UCI Continental teams make up the 19 teams that participated in the race. Each team entered a full squad of seven riders with the exception of Cofidis entering six, for a total of 132 riders who started the race.

UCI WorldTeams

- Alpecin–Deceuninck
- Arkéa–B&B Hotels
- Cofidis
- Decathlon–AG2R La Mondiale
- EF Education–EasyPost
- Groupama–FDJ
- Lidl–Trek

UCI ProTeams

- Bingoal WB
- Equipo Kern Pharma
- Lotto–Dstny
- Team Corratec–Vini Fantini
- Team Flanders–Baloise
- Team TotalEnergies
- Tudor Pro Cycling Team
- Uno-X Mobility

UCI Continental Teams

- CIC U Nantes Atlantique
- Nice Métropole Côte d'Azur
- St. Michel–Mavic–Auber93
- Van Rysel–Roubaix

== Route ==
Stage characteristics and winners
| Stage | Date | Course | Distance | Type | Stage winner |
|---|---|---|---|---|---|
| 1 | 31 January | Bellegarde to Bellegarde | 160.6 km (99.8 mi) | Flat stage | Cancelled |
| 2 | 1 February | Marguerittes to Rousson | 163.58 km (101.64 mi) | Hilly stage | Axel Laurance (FRA) |
| 3 | 2 February | Bessèges to Bessèges | 161.11 km (100.11 mi) | Hilly stage | Mads Pedersen (DEN) |
| 4 | 3 February | Méjannes-le-Clap to Méjannes-le-Clap | 154.48 km (95.99 mi) | Hilly stage | Samuel Leroux (FRA) |
| 5 | 4 February | Alès to Alès | 10.645 km (6.614 mi) | Individual time trial | Kévin Vauquelin (FRA) |
| Total | | | 654.415 km (406.635 mi) | | |

== Stages ==
=== Stage 1 ===
31 January 2024 – Bellegarde to Bellegarde, 162.18 km (100.77 mi)

Cancelled due to requests from the prefecture because of ongoing farmers protests.

=== Stage 2 ===
1 February 2024 – Marguerittes to Rousson, 163.58 km (101.64 mi)

Stage 2 Result (1–10)
| Rank | Rider | Team | Time |
|---|---|---|---|
| 1 | Axel Laurance (FRA) | Alpecin–Deceuninck | 3h 57' 10" |
| 2 | Mads Pedersen (DEN) | Lidl–Trek | + 0" |
| 3 | Kévin Vauquelin (FRA) | Arkéa–B&B Hotels | + 0" |
| 4 | Kevin Geniets (LUX) | Groupama–FDJ | + 0" |
| 5 | Rémy Rochas (FRA) | Groupama–FDJ | + 4" |
| 6 | Brent Van Moer (BEL) | Lotto–Dstny | + 4" |
| 7 | Benoît Cosnefroy (FRA) | Decathlon–AG2R La Mondiale | + 7" |
| 8 | Alex Baudin (FRA) | Decathlon–AG2R La Mondiale | + 7" |
| 9 | Aurélien Paret-Peintre (FRA) | Decathlon–AG2R La Mondiale | + 7" |
| 10 | Jenno Berckmoes (BEL) | Lotto–Dstny | + 11" |

General classification after Stage 2 (1–10)
| Rank | Rider | Team | Time |
|---|---|---|---|
| 1 | Axel Laurance (FRA) | Alpecin–Deceuninck | 3h 57' 00" |
| 2 | Mads Pedersen (DEN) | Lidl–Trek | + 4" |
| 3 | Kévin Vauquelin (FRA) | Arkéa–B&B Hotels | + 6" |
| 4 | Kevin Geniets (LUX) | Groupama–FDJ | + 10" |
| 5 | Rémy Rochas (FRA) | Groupama–FDJ | + 14" |
| 6 | Brent Van Moer (BEL) | Lotto–Dstny | + 14" |
| 7 | Benoît Cosnefroy (FRA) | Decathlon–AG2R La Mondiale | + 17" |
| 8 | Alex Baudin (FRA) | Decathlon–AG2R La Mondiale | + 17" |
| 9 | Aurélien Paret-Peintre (FRA) | Decathlon–AG2R La Mondiale | + 17" |
| 10 | Jenno Berckmoes (BEL) | Lotto–Dstny | + 21" |

=== Stage 3 ===
2 February 2024 – Bessèges to Bessèges, 161.11 km (100.11 mi)

Stage 3 Result (1–10)
| Rank | Rider | Team | Time |
|---|---|---|---|
| 1 | Mads Pedersen (DEN) | Lidl–Trek | 3h 43' 54" |
| 2 | Milan Menten (BEL) | Lotto–Dstny | + 0" |
| 3 | Rasmus Tiller (NOR) | Uno-X Mobility | + 0" |
| 4 | Sandy Dujardin (FRA) | Team TotalEnergies | + 0" |
| 5 | Benoît Cosnefroy (FRA) | Decathlon–AG2R La Mondiale | + 0" |
| 6 | Samuel Leroux (FRA) | Van Rysel–Roubaix | + 0" |
| 7 | Axel Laurance (FRA) | Alpecin–Deceuninck | + 0" |
| 8 | Kenneth Van Rooy (BEL) | Bingoal WB | + 0" |
| 9 | Maxime Jarnet (FRA) | Van Rysel–Roubaix | + 0" |
| 10 | Alexandre Delettre (FRA) | St. Michel–Mavic–Auber93 | + 0" |

General classification after Stage 3 (1–10)
| Rank | Rider | Team | Time |
|---|---|---|---|
| 1 | Mads Pedersen (DEN) | Lidl–Trek | 7h 40' 48" |
| 2 | Axel Laurance (FRA) | Alpecin–Deceuninck | + 6" |
| 3 | Kévin Vauquelin (FRA) | Arkéa–B&B Hotels | + 12" |
| 4 | Kevin Geniets (LUX) | Groupama–FDJ | + 16" |
| 5 | Brent Van Moer (BEL) | Lotto–Dstny | + 20" |
| 6 | Rémy Rochas (FRA) | Groupama–FDJ | + 20" |
| 7 | Benoît Cosnefroy (FRA) | Decathlon–AG2R La Mondiale | + 23" |
| 8 | Aurélien Paret-Peintre (FRA) | Decathlon–AG2R La Mondiale | + 23" |
| 9 | Alex Baudin (FRA) | Decathlon–AG2R La Mondiale | + 23" |
| 10 | Jenno Berckmoes (BEL) | Lotto–Dstny | + 27" |

=== Stage 4 ===
3 February 2024 – Méjannes-le-Clap to Méjannes-le-Clap, 154.48 km (95.99 mi)

Stage 4 Result (1–10)
| Rank | Rider | Team | Time |
|---|---|---|---|
| 1 | Samuel Leroux (FRA) | Van Rysel–Roubaix | 3h 28' 32" |
| 2 | Stefan Bissegger (SUI) | EF Education–EasyPost | + 0" |
| 3 | Dries De Bondt (BEL) | Decathlon–AG2R La Mondiale | + 0" |
| 4 | Jonas Iversby Hvideberg (NOR) | Uno-X Mobility | + 2" |
| 5 | Magnus Cort (DEN) | Uno-X Mobility | + 2" |
| 6 | Alberto Bettiol (ITA) | EF Education–EasyPost | + 2" |
| 7 | Jenno Berckmoes (BEL) | Lotto–Dstny | + 2" |
| 8 | Rasmus Tiller (NOR) | Uno-X Mobility | + 2" |
| 9 | Mads Pedersen (DEN) | Lidl–Trek | + 2" |
| 10 | Timo Kielich (BEL) | Alpecin–Deceuninck | + 2" |

General classification after Stage 4 (1–10)
| Rank | Rider | Team | Time |
|---|---|---|---|
| 1 | Mads Pedersen (DEN) | Lidl–Trek | 11h 09' 22" |
| 2 | Axel Laurance (FRA) | Alpecin–Deceuninck | + 6" |
| 3 | Kévin Vauquelin (FRA) | Arkéa–B&B Hotels | + 12" |
| 4 | Kevin Geniets (LUX) | Groupama–FDJ | + 16" |
| 5 | Brent Van Moer (BEL) | Lotto–Dstny | + 20" |
| 6 | Rémy Rochas (FRA) | Groupama–FDJ | + 20" |
| 7 | Benoît Cosnefroy (FRA) | Decathlon–AG2R La Mondiale | + 23" |
| 8 | Aurélien Paret-Peintre (FRA) | Decathlon–AG2R La Mondiale | + 23" |
| 9 | Alex Baudin (FRA) | Decathlon–AG2R La Mondiale | + 23" |
| 10 | Jenno Berckmoes (BEL) | Lotto–Dstny | + 27" |

=== Stage 5 ===
4 February 2024 – Alès to Alès, 10.645 km (6.614 mi), (ITT)

Stage 5 Result (1–10)
| Rank | Rider | Team | Time |
|---|---|---|---|
| 1 | Kévin Vauquelin (FRA) | Arkéa–B&B Hotels | 15' 02" |
| 2 | Mads Pedersen (DEN) | Lidl–Trek | + 10" |
| 3 | Alberto Bettiol (ITA) | EF Education–EasyPost | + 14" |
| 4 | Ben Healy (IRL) | EF Education–EasyPost | + 22" |
| 5 | Sean Quinn (USA) | EF Education–EasyPost | + 24" |
| 6 | Simon Carr (GBR) | EF Education–EasyPost | + 27" |
| 7 | Stefan Bissegger (SUI) | EF Education–EasyPost | + 36" |
| 8 | Toms Skujiņš (LAT) | Lidl–Trek | + 37" |
| 9 | Aurélien Paret-Peintre (FRA) | Decathlon–AG2R La Mondiale | + 38" |
| 10 | Jenno Berckmoes (BEL) | Lotto–Dstny | + 39" |

General classification after Stage 5 (1–10)
| Rank | Rider | Team | Time |
|---|---|---|---|
| 1 | Mads Pedersen (DEN) | Lidl–Trek | 11h 24' 34" |
| 2 | Kévin Vauquelin (FRA) | Arkéa–B&B Hotels | + 2" |
| 3 | Alberto Bettiol (ITA) | EF Education–EasyPost | + 32" |
| 4 | Ben Healy (IRL) | EF Education–EasyPost | + 43" |
| 5 | Rémy Rochas (FRA) | Groupama–FDJ | + 51" |
| 6 | Aurélien Paret-Peintre (FRA) | Decathlon–AG2R La Mondiale | + 51" |
| 7 | Alex Baudin (FRA) | Decathlon–AG2R La Mondiale | + 54" |
| 8 | Jenno Berckmoes (BEL) | Lotto–Dstny | + 56" |
| 9 | Brent Van Moer (BEL) | Lotto–Dstny | + 58" |
| 10 | Kevin Geniets (LUX) | Groupama–FDJ | + 59" |

== Classification leadership table ==
Classification leadership by stage
| Stage | Winner | General classification (Note: The general classification leader's jersey is known as the coral jersey.) | Points classification | Mountains classification | Young rider classification | Team classification |
|---|---|---|---|---|---|---|
| 1 | stage cancelled | | | | | |
| 2 | Axel Laurance | Axel Laurance | Axel Laurance | Jean-Louis Le Ny | Axel Laurance | Groupama–FDJ |
| 3 | Mads Pedersen | Mads Pedersen | Mads Pedersen | Jonas Abrahamsen | Axel Laurance | Groupama–FDJ |
| 4 | Samuel Leroux | Mads Pedersen | Mads Pedersen | Jonas Abrahamsen | Axel Laurance | Decathlon–AG2R La Mondiale |
| 5 | Kévin Vauquelin | Mads Pedersen | Mads Pedersen | Jonas Abrahamsen | Kévin Vauquelin | Decathlon–AG2R La Mondiale |
| Final | | Mads Pedersen | Mads Pedersen | Jonas Abrahamsen | Kévin Vauquelin | Decathlon–AG2R La Mondiale |

== Classification standings ==
Legend
| Denotes the winner of the general classification | Denotes the winner of the points classification |
| Denotes the winner of the mountains classification | Denotes the winner of the young rider classification |

=== General classification ===
Final general classification (1–10)
| Rank | Rider | Team | Time |
|---|---|---|---|
| 1 | Mads Pedersen (DEN) | Lidl–Trek | 11h 24' 34" |
| 2 | Kévin Vauquelin (FRA) | Arkéa–B&B Hotels | + 2" |
| 3 | Alberto Bettiol (ITA) | EF Education–EasyPost | + 32" |
| 4 | Ben Healy (IRL) | EF Education–EasyPost | + 43" |
| 5 | Rémy Rochas (FRA) | Groupama–FDJ | + 51" |
| 6 | Aurélien Paret-Peintre (FRA) | Decathlon–AG2R La Mondiale | + 51" |
| 7 | Alex Baudin (FRA) | Decathlon–AG2R La Mondiale | + 54" |
| 8 | Jenno Berckmoes (BEL) | Lotto–Dstny | + 56" |
| 9 | Brent Van Moer (BEL) | Lotto–Dstny | + 58" |
| 10 | Kevin Geniets (LUX) | Groupama–FDJ | + 59" |

=== Points classification ===
Final points classification (1–10)
| Rank | Rider | Team | Time |
|---|---|---|---|
| 1 | Mads Pedersen (DEN) | Lidl–Trek | 72 |
| 2 | Kévin Vauquelin (FRA) | Arkéa–B&B Hotels | 42 |
| 3 | Axel Laurance (FRA) | Alpecin–Deceuninck | 37 |
| 4 | Samuel Leroux (FRA) | Van Rysel–Roubaix | 35 |
| 5 | Alberto Bettiol (ITA) | EF Education–EasyPost | 30 |
| 6 | Stefan Bissegger (SUI) | EF Education–EasyPost | 29 |
| 7 | Rasmus Tiller (NOR) | Uno-X Mobility | 24 |
| 8 | Jenno Berckmoes (BEL) | Lotto–Dstny | 21 |
| 9 | Benoît Cosnefroy (FRA) | Decathlon–AG2R La Mondiale | 21 |
| 10 | Milan Menten (BEL) | Lotto–Dstny | 20 |

=== Mountains classification ===
Final mountains classification (1–10)
| Rank | Rider | Team | Time |
|---|---|---|---|
| 1 | Jonas Abrahamsen (NOR) | Uno-X Mobility | 42 |
| 2 | Jean-Louis Le Ny (FRA) | Nice Métropole Côte d'Azur | 16 |
| 3 | Alexis Gougeard (FRA) | Cofidis | 14 |
| 4 | Simon Carr (GBR) | EF Education–EasyPost | 14 |
| 5 | Dries De Bondt (BEL) | Decathlon–AG2R La Mondiale | 12 |
| 6 | Mads Pedersen (DEN) | Lidl–Trek | 12 |
| 7 | Maximilian Juillard (FRA) | Van Rysel–Roubaix | 12 |
| 8 | Théo Delacroix (FRA) | St. Michel–Mavic–Auber93 | 12 |
| 9 | Thomas Gachignard (FRA) | Team TotalEnergies | 10 |
| 10 | Samuel Leroux (FRA) | Van Rysel–Roubaix | 8 |

=== Young rider classification ===
Final young rider classification (1–10)
| Rank | Rider | Team | Time |
|---|---|---|---|
| 1 | Kévin Vauquelin (FRA) | Arkéa–B&B Hotels | 11h 24' 36" |
| 2 | Alex Baudin (FRA) | Decathlon–AG2R La Mondiale | + 52" |
| 3 | Jenno Berckmoes (BEL) | Lotto–Dstny | + 54" |
| 4 | Axel Laurance (FRA) | Alpecin–Deceuninck | + 1' 01" |
| 5 | Alec Segaert (BEL) | Lotto–Dstny | + 1' 29" |
| 6 | Andrii Ponomar (UKR) | Team Corratec–Vini Fantini | + 2' 21" |
| 7 | Giacomo Villa (ITA) | Bingoal WB | + 3' 54" |
| 8 | Pierre Henry Basset (FRA) | CIC U Nantes Atlantique | + 4' 29" |
| 9 | Marco Brenner (GER) | Tudor Pro Cycling Team | + 4' 38" |
| 10 | Lukas Nerurkar (GBR) | EF Education–EasyPost | + 5' 08" |

=== Teams classification ===
Final team classification (1–10)
| Rank | Team | Time |
|---|---|---|
| 1 | (France) Decathlon–AG2R La Mondiale | 34h 16' 26" |
| 2 | (France) Groupama–FDJ | + 24" |
| 3 | (Belgium) Lotto–Dstny | + 41" |
| 4 | (United States) EF Education–EasyPost | + 53" |
| 5 | (France) Cofidis | + 1' 55" |
| 6 | (Norway) Uno-X Mobility | + 1' 57" |
| 7 | (France) Team TotalEnergies | + 3' 12" |
| 8 | (France) St. Michel–Mavic–Auber93 | + 3' 15" |
| 9 | (Switzerland) Tudor Pro Cycling Team | + 3' 21" |
| 10 | (Spain) Equipo Kern Pharma | + 3' 29" |
