= Alex Colman =

Belgian cyclist

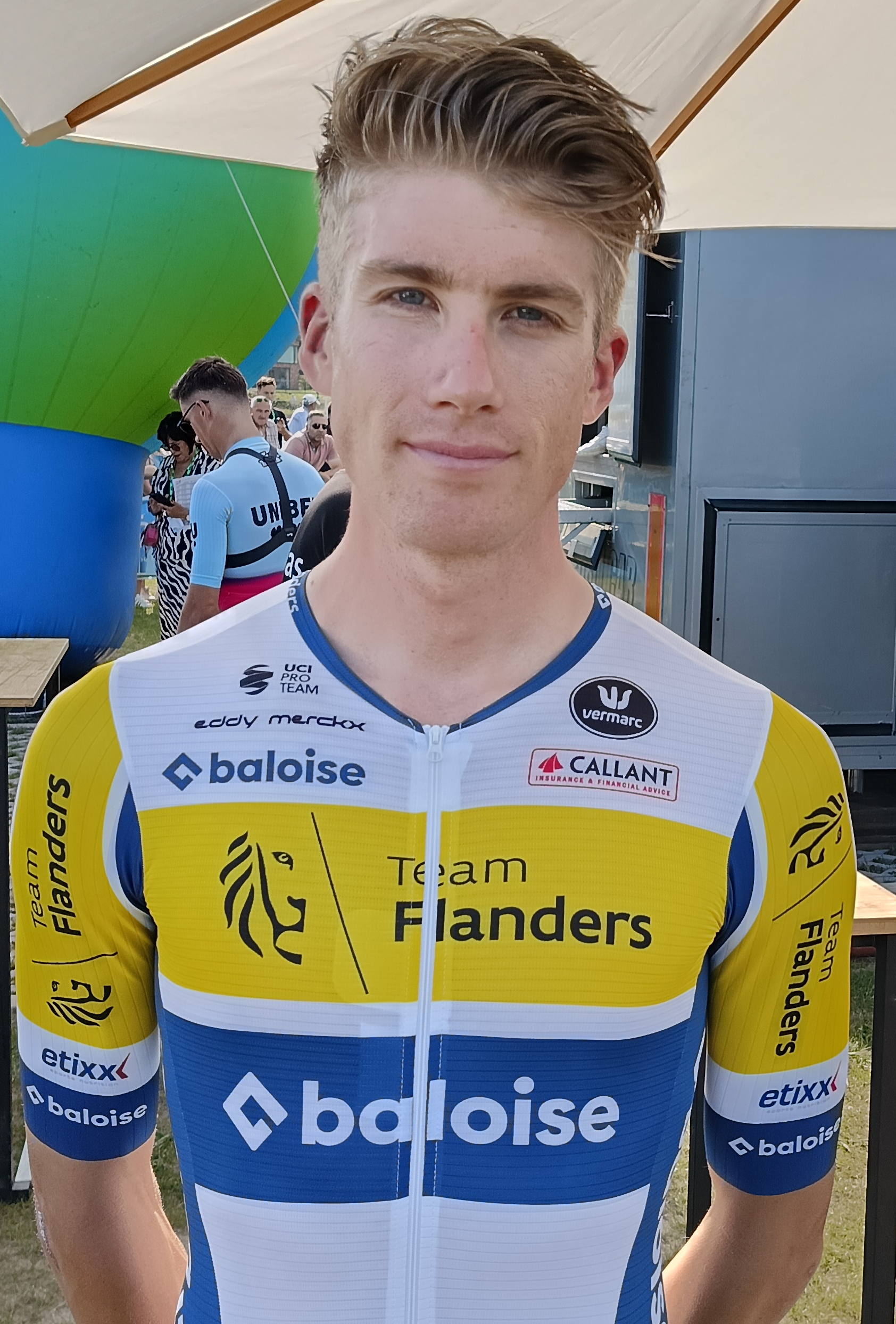
- Colman in 2024

Personal information
- Born: 22 July 1998 (age 28) Sint-Niklaas, Belgium
- Height: 1.84 m (6 ft 0 in)
- Weight: 76 kg (168 lb)

Cycling career
- Sport: Cycling
- Disciplines: Road; Cyclo-cross
- Role: Rider

Amateur teams
- 2016: Lares–Doltcini
- 2017: Image4U–Trek
- 2017–2018: Lotto–Soudal U23

Professional teams
- 2018–2020: Canyon Eisberg
- 2021–2025: Sport Vlaanderen–Baloise

Alex Colman (born 22 July 1998) is a retired Belgian racing cyclist, who most recently rode for UCI ProTeam Team Flanders–Baloise.

== Major results ==
2017
8th Kernen Omloop Echt-Susteren
2018
1st Stage 1 (TTT) Okolo Jižních Čech
4th De Kustpijl
6th Eschborn–Frankfurt Under–23
6th Dorpenomloop Rucphen
2022
1st Mountains classification, Four Days of Dunkirk
2023
1st Mountains classification, Four Days of Dunkirk
2025
8th Dwars door het Hageland
