= Dário António =

Angolan cyclist (born 1992)

Personal information
- Full name: Dário António Marcelino
- Born: 22 October 1992 (age 33) Maianga, Angola

Cycling career
- Sport: Cycling
- Discipline: Road
- Role: Rider

Amateur teams
- 2017–2018: BAI–Sicasal–Petro de Luanda
- 2021: BAI–Sicasal–Petro de Luanda
- 2022: ACT

Professional teams
- 2014: Banco BIC–Carmim
- 2019–2020: BAI–Sicasal–Petro de Luanda

Dário António Marcelino (born 22 October 1992) is an Angolan cyclist, who last rode for Angolan amateur team ACT.

== Major results ==
2012
National Road Championships

2nd Time trial
3rd Road race

2013
3rd Road race, National Road Championships
2015
National Road Championships

3rd Time trial
3rd Road race

2016
1st Road race, National Road Championships
2017
National Road Championships

1st Time trial
2nd Road race

4th Overall Tour de Côte d'Ivoire
2018
National Road Championships

1st Time trial
2nd Road race

2019
1st Time trial, National Road Championships
1st Overall Tour du Faso

1st Stage 1 (TTT)

2022
1st Time trial, National Road Championships
2023
1st Overall Volta Angola
8th Time trial, African Road Championships
2024
1st Time trial, National Road Championships
