= Ángel Fuentes =

Spanish cyclist

Personal information
- Full name: Ángel Fuentes Paniego
- Born: 5 November 1996 (age 29) Burgos, Spain
- Height: 1.9 m (6 ft 3 in)
- Weight: 77 kg (170 lb)

Cycling career
- Sport: Cycling
- Current team: Burgos Burpellet BH
- Discipline: Road
- Role: Rider

Amateur teams
- 2015–2016: Specialized–Fundación Contador
- 2016: Café Baqué–Conservas Campo
- 2017–2018: Baqué–BH
- 2018: Burgos BH (stagiaire)
- 2019: Gomur–Cantabria Infinita

Professional team
- 2019–: Burgos BH

Ángel Fuentes Paniego (born 5 November 1996) is a Spanish cyclist, who currently rides for UCI ProTeam Burgos Burpellet BH.

== Major results ==
2019
1st Prologue & Stage 1 Vuelta Ciclista a León
1st Aiztondo Klasika
2021
6th Route Adélie
2022
10th Route Adélie
