= Algeria national cycling team =

The Algeria national cycling team represents Algeria in International cycling competitions such as Olympic Games or World cycling Championships.

== Medal count ==
Competition	Medal table				
Competition	1st place, gold medalist(s)	2nd place, silver medalist(s)	3rd place, bronze medalist(s)	Tot.	Rank
Summer Olympics	0	0	0	0	−
World cycling Championships	0	0	0	0	−
Mediterranean Games	0	0	3	3	11
African Games	7	7	8	22	2
African Championships	2	7	12	21	?
Total	9	14	23	46	−

== List of medalists at Mediterranean Games ==
Medal	Name	Games	Event
Bronze	Algeria	1975 Algiers, Algeria	Team Time Trial
Bronze	Farouk Hamza	1983 Casablanca, Morocco	Men's road race
Bronze	Abdelbasset Hannachi	2013 Mersin, Turkey	Men's road race

== See also ==
- Algeria at the Olympics
