= Igor Silva (cyclist) =

Angolan bicycle racer

Personal information
- Full name: Igor Alberto Secundino Silva
- Born: 22 October 1984 (age 41)

Cycling career
- Sport: Cycling
- Current team: BAI–Sicasal–Petro de Luanda
- Discipline: Road
- Role: Rider

Amateur teams
- 2015: Benfica de Luanda
- 2016–2020: Jair Transportes de Benguela

Professional teams
- 2013–2014: Banco BIC–Carmim
- 2020–: BAI–Sicasal–Petro de Luanda

Igor Alberto Secundino Silva (born 22 October 1984) is an Angolan road racing cyclist, who currently rides for UCI Continental team BAI–Sicasal–Petro de Luanda.

== Major results ==
2006
1st Time trial, National Road Championships
2007
1st Time trial, National Road Championships
2010
National Road Championships

1st Road race
1st Time trial

2011
National Road Championships

1st Road race
1st Time trial

2012
National Road Championships

1st Road race
1st Time trial

2013
National Road Championships

1st Road race
1st Time trial

2014
National Road Championships

1st Road race
1st Time trial

2015
National Road Championships

1st Road race
1st Time trial

1st Overall Tour of the Democratic Republic of Congo

1st Stages 1 & 3

2016
1st Time trial, National Road Championships
2017
National Road Championships

1st Road race
2nd Time trial

2018
National Road Championships

3rd Road race
3rd Time trial

2019
3rd Overall Tour of Egypt
2022
2nd Time trial, National Road Championships
2023
1st Road race, National Road Championships
1st Stages 1 & 6 Volta Angola
2024
National Road Championships

1st Road race
2nd Time trial
