= Péronne-en-Mélantois =

- Commune
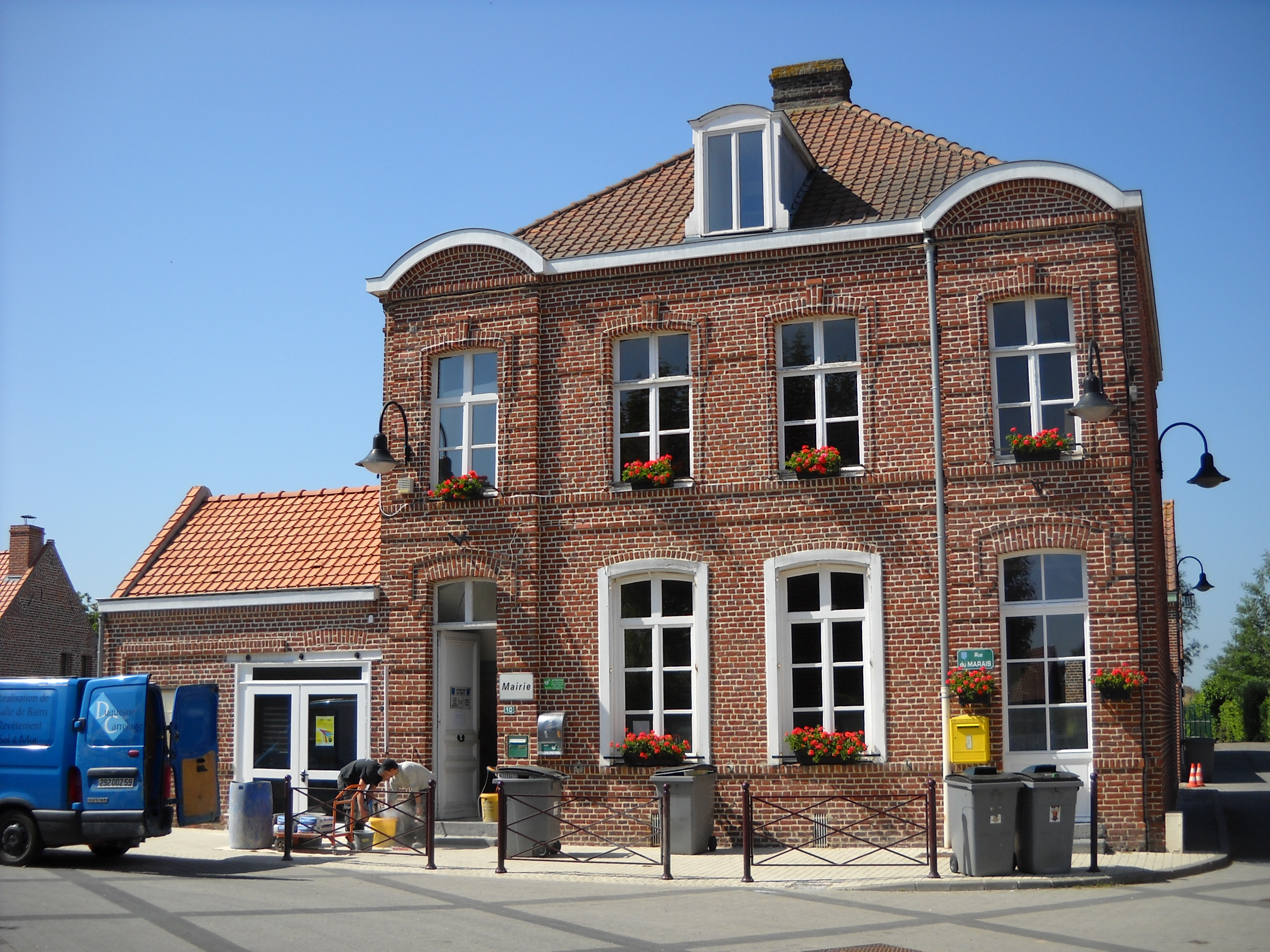
- The town hall in Péronne-en-Mélantois

- Coat of arms
- Location of Péronne-en-Mélantois
- Location within France Location within Hauts-de-France
- Coordinates: 50°34′06″N 3°10′10″E
- Country: France
- Region: Hauts-de-France
- Department: Nord
- Arrondissement: Lille
- Canton: Templeuve-en-Pévèle
- Intercommunality: Métropole Européenne de Lille

Government
  - Mayor (2020–2026): Damien Castelain
- Area^{1}: 1.14 km^{2} (0.44 sq mi)
- Elevation: 33 m (108 ft)
- Highest elevation: 35 m (115 ft)
- Lowest elevation: 26 m (85 ft)
- Population (2023): 1,025
  - Density: 899/km^{2} (2,330/sq mi)
- Time zone: UTC+01:00 (CET)
  - Summer (DST): UTC+02:00 (CEST)
- INSEE/Postal code: 59458 /59273
- ^{1} French Land Register data, which excludes lakes, ponds, glaciers > 1 km^{2} (0.386 sq mi or 247 acres) and river estuaries.

Péronne-en-Mélantois (French pronunciation: [peʁɔn ɑ̃ melɑ̃twa], lit. 'Péronne in Mélantois') is a commune in the Nord department in northern France. It is part of the Métropole Européenne de Lille.

== Heraldry ==
Arms of Péronne-en-Mélantois	The arms of Péronne-en-Mélantois are blazoned : Azure, 3 martlets argent.

== See also ==
- Communes of the Nord department
