= Emmanuel Morin =

French cyclist

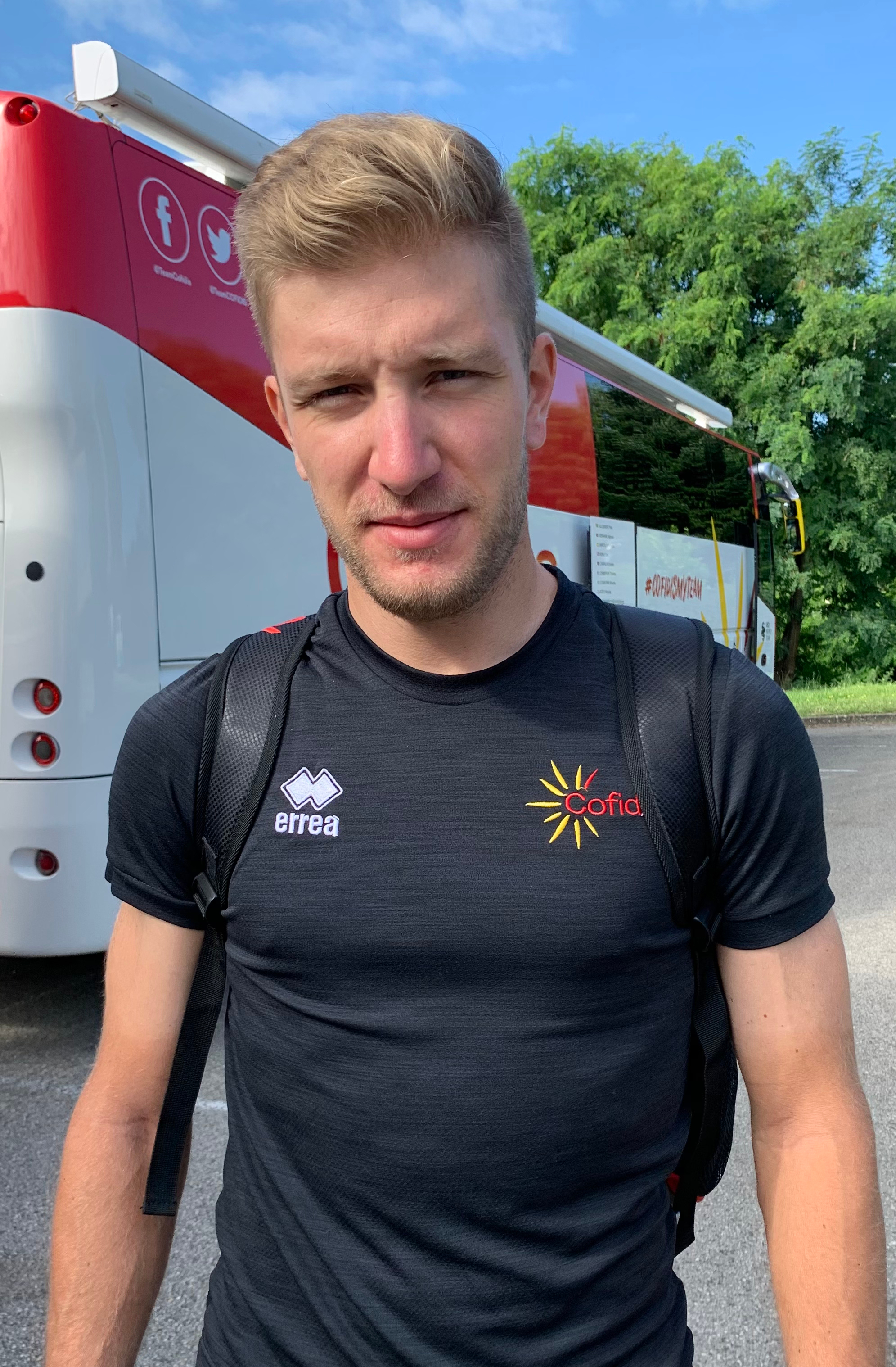

Personal information
- Born: 13 March 1995 (age 31) Machecoul, France
- Height: 1.78 m (5 ft 10 in)
- Weight: 72 kg (159 lb)

Cycling career
- Sport: Cycling
- Current team: Van Rysel–Roubaix
- Discipline: Road
- Role: Rider
- Rider type: Puncheur

Amateur teams
- 2015–2016: US Saint-Herblain
- 2017–2018: Sojasun Espoir–ACNC
- 2018: Cofidis (stagiaire)

Professional teams
- 2019–2021: Cofidis
- 2022–2023: Team UC Nantes Atlantique
- 2024–: Van Rysel–Roubaix

Emmanuel Morin (born 13 March 1995) is a French cyclist, who currently rides for UCI Continental team Van Rysel–Roubaix. In October 2020, he was named in the startlist for the 2020 Vuelta a España.

== Major results ==
2018
1st Route bretonne
2020
3rd Overall La Tropicale Amissa Bongo
2021
2nd Route Adélie
2022
2nd Cholet-Pays de la Loire
6th Route Adélie
8th Paris–Troyes
10th La Roue Tourangelle
2023
1st Route bretonne
9th Classic Loire Atlantique
2024
1st Grand Prix de la Ville de Lillers
3rd Classic Loire Atlantique
5th Le Tour des 100 Communes
6th La Roue Tourangelle
7th Cholet-Pays de la Loire
2025
3rd Paris–Troyes
4th Circuit du Morbihan

=== Grand Tour general classification results timeline ===
Grand Tour	2020	2021
Giro d'Italia	—	—
Tour de France	—	—
Vuelta a España	134	DNF

Legend
—	Did not compete
DNF	Did not finish
