= Jordan Levasseur =

French cyclist

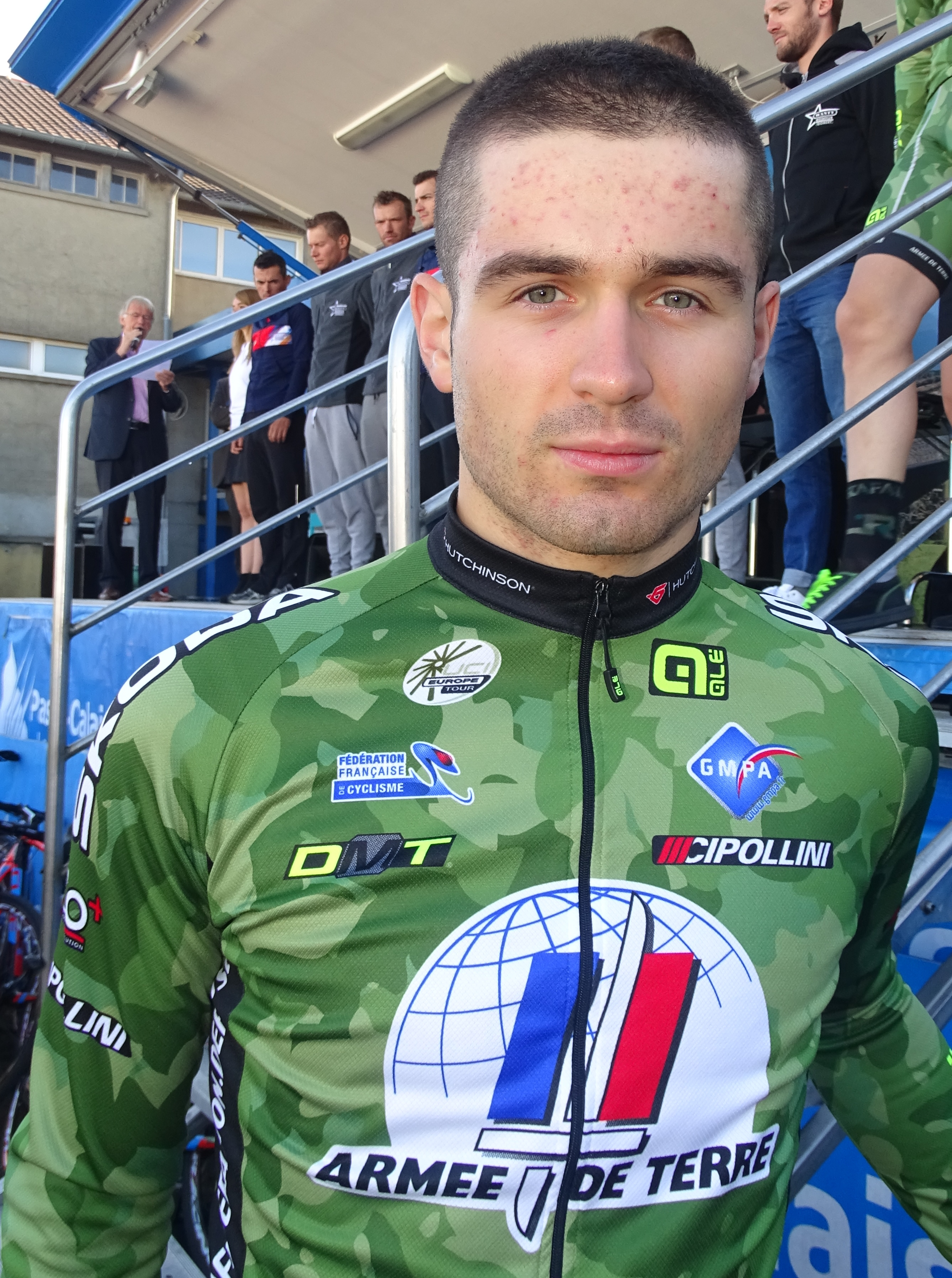
- Levasseur in 2015

Personal information
- Full name: Jordan Levasseur
- Born: 29 May 1995 (age 31) Saint-Saire, France
- Height: 1.78 m (5 ft 10 in)
- Weight: 74 kg (163 lb)

Cycling career
- Sport: Cycling
- Current team: VC Rouen 76
- Discipline: Road
- Role: Rider

Amateur teams
- 2011–2013: USSA Pavilly Barentin Junior
- 2014: Armée de Terre
- 2018: VC Toucy
- 2019: VC Rouen 76
- 2022–: VC Rouen 76

Professional teams
- 2015–2017: Armée de Terre
- 2020–2021: Natura4Ever–Roubaix–Lille Métropole

Jordan Levasseur (born 29 May 1995) is a French cyclist, who currently rides for French amateur team VC Rouen 76.

== Major results ==
=== Track ===
2013
UEC European Junior Track Championships

1st Madison (with Corentin Ermenault)
2nd Team pursuit
3rd Omnium

1st Team pursuit, National Junior Track Championships
2016
National Track Championships

1st Madison (with Benjamin Thomas)
3rd Team pursuit

=== Road ===
2017
1st Overall Paris–Arras Tour

1st Stage 3

1st Grand Prix de la ville de Nogent-sur-Oise
Ronde de l'Oise

1st Points classification
1st Stage 4

5th Famenne Ardenne Classic
7th Grand Prix de Fourmies
2018
8th Paris–Troyes
2019
1st Stage 3 Ronde de l'Oise
2020
1st Overall La Tropicale Amissa Bongo

1st Sprints classification
