= Samuel Leroux =

French cyclist

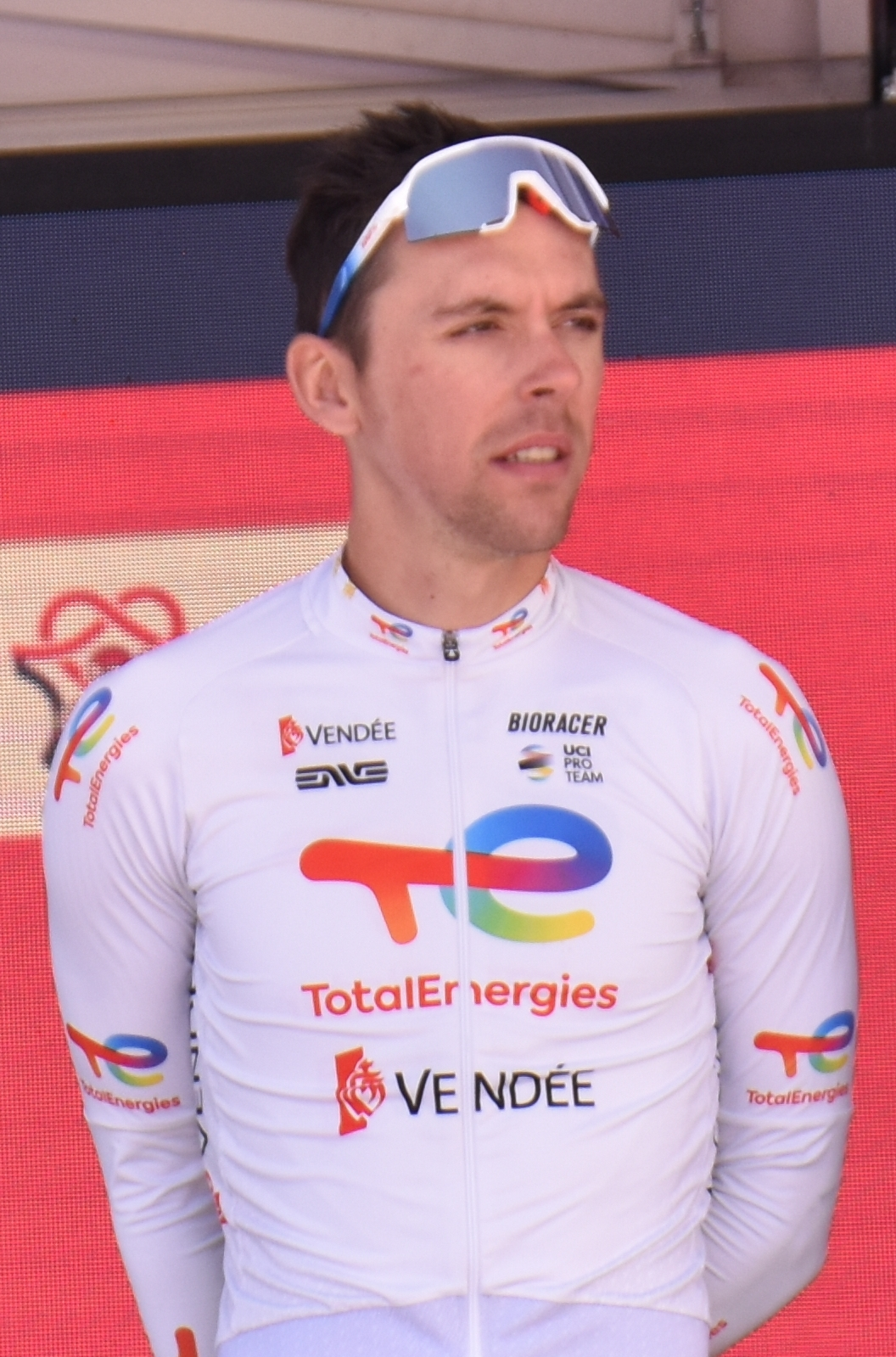
- Leroux in 2025

Personal information
- Born: 27 November 1994 (age 31) Boulogne-sur-Mer, France
- Height: 1.89 m (6 ft 2 in)
- Weight: 79 kg (174 lb)

Cycling career
- Sport: Cycling
- Current team: Team TotalEnergies
- Disciplines: Road; Mountain biking
- Role: Rider

Amateur teams
- 2011–2012: VC Roubaix–Lille Métropole
- 2013–2015: ESEG Douai
- 2016: Dunkerque Littoral Cyclisme–Cofidis
- 2016: Veranclassic–Ago (stagiaire)
- 2017: CC Nogent-sur-Oise

Professional teams
- 2018–2024: Roubaix–Lille Métropole
- 2025–: Team TotalEnergies

Samuel Leroux (born 27 November 1994) is a French professional racing cyclist, who currently rides for UCI ProTeam Team TotalEnergies. He took a surprise victory on stage four of the 2024 Étoile de Bessèges from the breakaway, holding off the chasing peloton by two seconds.

== Major results ==
=== Road ===
2012
9th Grand Prix Bati-Metallo
2015
4th Paris–Mantes-en-Yvelines
2016
5th Time trial, National Under-23 Road Championships
2017
1st Trio Normand (with Romain Bacon & Kévin Lalouette)
9th Paris–Mantes-en-Yvelines
2019
3rd Grand Prix de la ville de Nogent-sur-Oise
2020
1st Paris–Connerré
2021
10th Eurométropole Tour
10th Grand Prix de la ville de Pérenchies
2022
1st Overall Tour d'Eure-et-Loir

1st Stage 3

4th Grand Prix de la Ville de Lillers
8th Grand Prix de Denain
2023
1st Trofee Maarten Wynants
1st Omloop van het Waasland
1st Stage 2 Tour d'Eure-et-Loir
2nd Ruddervoorde Koerse
2024 (1 pro win)
1st Omloop van het Waasland
1st Stage 4 Étoile de Bessèges
3rd Overall Tour Poitou-Charentes en Nouvelle-Aquitaine
2025 (2)
1st Overall Tour Poitou-Charentes en Nouvelle-Aquitaine

1st Stage 3 (ITT)

2026
3rd Overall Tour Poitou-Charentes en Nouvelle-Aquitaine

=== Mountain bike ===
2019
1st Beach race, National Championships
2021
1st Beach race, UEC European Championships
1st Beach race, National Championships
