= BAI–Sicasal–Petro de Luanda =

Angolan professional cycling team

Team information
- UCI code: BSP
- Registered: Angola
- Founded: 2017
- Status: National (2017–2018); UCI Continental (2019–)

Team name history
- 2017–: BAI–Sicasal–Petro de Luanda

BAI–Sicasal–Petro de Luanda is a UCI Continental road cycling team based in Angola. The team was established in 2017. It became UCI registered in late 2018, in preparation for the 2019 season.

== Team roster ==
As of 6 July 2020.

Rider	Date of birth
Dário António (ANG)	22 October 1992 (age 33)
Bruno Araújo (ANG)	7 January 1998 (age 28)
Mario Carvalho (ANG)	22 January 1995 (age 31)
Gabriel Cole (ANG)	2 February 1997 (age 29)
Hélder da Silva (ANG)	12 September 1995 (age 30)
Stevan Kervadec (FRA)	13 November 1993 (age 32)

Rider	Date of birth
Julien Laidoun (FRA)	24 January 1980 (age 46)
Hélvio Lemos (ANG)	12 September 2001 (age 24)
Carlos Oyarzun (CHI)	26 October 1981 (age 44)
Igor Silva (ANG)	22 October 1984 (age 41)
Cruz Tuto (ANG)	13 March 1986 (age 40)
Adilson Zacarias (ANG)	4 April 1996 (age 30)

== Major results ==
2019
Stage 1 Tour du Faso, Team time trial
