= Van Rysel–Roubaix =

French cycling team

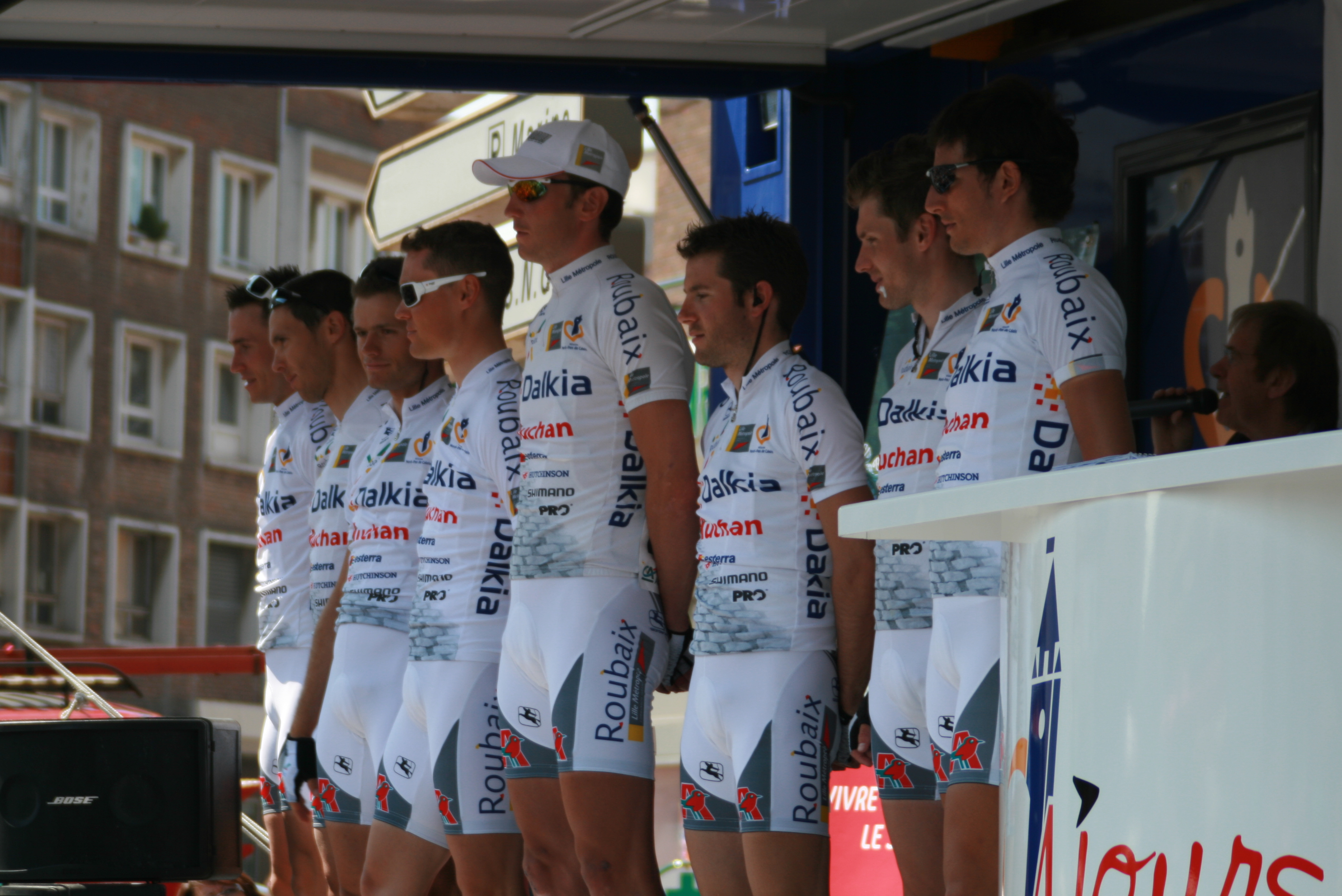

Team information
- UCI code: RLM (2007–2015, 2017–2018); RML (2016); NRL (2019–2020); XRL (2021); GRL (2022–2023); VRL (2023); VRR (2024–)
- Registered: France
- Founded: 2007
- Discipline: Road
- Status: UCI Continental
- Bicycles: Van Rysel
- Website: Team home page

Key personnel
- General manager: Olivier Decock
- Team managers: Frédéric Delcambre; Geoffrey Coupé; Michel Dernies

Team name history
- 2007–2015 2016 2017–2018 2019–2020 2021 2022–2023 2023 2024–: Roubaix–Lille Métropole (RLM); Roubaix–Métropole Européenne de Lille (RML); Roubaix–Lille Métropole (RLM); Natura4Ever–Roubaix–Lille Métropole (NRL); Xelliss–Roubaix–Lille Métropole (XRL); Go Sport–Roubaix–Lille Métropole (GRL); Van Rysel–Roubaix–Lille Métropole (VRL); Van Rysel–Roubaix (VRR)

Van Rysel–Roubaix is a French UCI Continental cycling team founded in 2007. For the 2019 season, the team secured additional sponsorship from Natura4Ever, which was later rebranded as Xelliss in 2021.

Van Rysel has been a title sponsor since 2023.

== Team roster ==
As of 12 March 2025.

Rider	Date of birth
Rait Ärm (EST)	31 March 2000 (age 26)
Daniel Årnes (NOR)	6 June 2000 (age 26)
Kévin Avoine (FRA)	14 November 1997 (age 28)
Rémi Capron (FRA)	18 June 2000 (age 26)
Célestin Guillon (FRA)	7 April 1996 (age 30)
Maxime Jarnet (FRA)	6 September 1998 (age 28)

Rider	Date of birth
Maximilien Juillard (FRA)	13 December 2001 (age 24)
Kenny Molly (BEL)	24 December 1996 (age 29)
Emmanuel Morin (FRA)	13 March 1995 (age 31)
Baptiste Planckaert (BEL)	28 September 1988 (age 37)
Valentin Tabellion (FRA)	23 March 1999 (age 27)
Killian Théot (FRA)	6 June 1999 (age 27)

== Major wins ==
2009
Stage 3 Tour du Gévaudan Languedoc-Roussillon, Florian Vachon
2010
Stage 4 Étoile de Bessèges, Arnaud Molmy
Grand Prix de la Ville de Lillers, Benoît Daeninck
Paris–Troyes, Cédric Pineau
Stage 3 Tour de Bretagne, Benoît Daeninck
Stage 6 Tour de Bretagne, Cédric Pineau
Overall Ronde de l'Oise, Steven Tronet
2011
Grand Prix de la Ville de Lillers, Denis Flahaut
Stage 2 Tour du Loir-et-Cher, Pierre-Luc Périchon
Grand Prix de la ville de Pérenchies, Anthony Colin
2012
Stage 3 Mi-Août en Bretagne, Morgan Kneisky
Stage 3 Boucles de la Mayenne, Fabien Schmidt
2013
Stage 1 Ronde de l'Oise, Maxime Le Montagner
2014
Le Samyn, Maxime Vantomme
Stage 1 Rhône-Alpes Isère Tour, Quentin Jaurégui
Overall Paris–Arras Tour, Maxime Vantomme

Stage 1, Team time trial

2015
Kattekoers, Baptiste Planckaert
Stage 1 Circuit des Ardennes, Rudy Barbier
Paris–Chauny, Maxime Vantomme
Prologue Tour Alsace, Julien Antomarchi
Stage 2 Tour Alsace, Timothy Dupont
Mountains classification Tour du Poitou-Charentes, Rudy Kowalski
2016
Paris–Troyes, Rudy Barbier
Cholet-Pays de Loire, Rudy Barbier
2018
Stage 4 Tour de Bretagne, Julien Antomarchi
Grand Prix de la ville de Nogent-sur-Oise, Julien Antomarchi
2019
Overall Boucles de la Mayenne, Thibault Ferasse
Grand Prix de la ville de Nogent-sur-Oise, Emiel Vermeulen
2020
Overall La Tropicale Amissa Bongo, Jordan Levasseur
2021
Grand Prix de la ville de Pérenchies, Emiel Vermeulen
2022
Overall Tour d'Eure-et-Loir, Samuel Leroux

Stage 2, Valentin Tabellion
Stage 3, Samuel Leroux

2023
Grand Prix de la ville de Pérenchies, Rait Ärm
Stage 2 Tour d'Eure-et-Loir, Samuel Leroux
2024
Estonian National Road Race Championships, Norman Vahtra
Grand Prix de la Ville de Lillers, Emmanuel Morin
Omloop van het Waasland, Samuel Leroux
Stage 4 Étoile de Bessèges, Samuel Leroux
Stage 3 Tour de l'Ain, Rémi Capron
Stage 2 Tour d'Eure-et-Loir, Valentin Tabellion
