= 2022 French Road Cycling Cup =

Bicycle competition

The 2022 French Road Cycling Cup is the 31st edition of the French Road Cycling Cup. There are 17 events, with the Mercan'Tour Classic Alpes-Maritimes making its debut in the competition and joining the usual 16 events from previous years.

The defending champions from the previous season are Dorian Godon, who won the individual and young rider classifications, and AG2R Citroën Team, who won the teams classification.

== Events ==
Date	Event	Winner	Team	Ref.	Series leader	Best young rider	Leading Team
30 January	Grand Prix La Marseillaise	Amaury Capiot (BEL)	Arkéa–Samsic		Amaury Capiot (BEL)	Kiko Galván (ESP)	AG2R Citroën Team
17 March	Grand Prix de Denain	Max Walscheid (GER)	Cofidis		Amaury Capiot (BEL)	Kiko Galván (ESP)	AG2R Citroën Team
19 March	Classic Loire Atlantique	Anthony Perez (FRA)	Cofidis		Amaury Capiot (BEL)	Lewis Askey (GBR)	AG2R Citroën Team
20 March	Cholet-Pays de la Loire	Marc Sarreau (FRA)	AG2R Citroën Team		Marc Sarreau (FRA)	Lewis Askey (GBR)	AG2R Citroën Team
27 March	La Roue Tourangelle	Nacer Bouhanni (FRA)	Arkéa–Samsic		Marc Sarreau (FRA)	Sandy Dujardin (FRA)	AG2R Citroën Team
1 April	Route Adélie	Axel Zingle (FRA)	Cofidis		Anthony Perez (FRA)	Axel Zingle (FRA)	AG2R Citroën Team
12 April	Paris–Camembert	Anthony Delaplace (FRA)	Arkéa–Samsic		Axel Zingle (FRA)	Axel Zingle (FRA)	AG2R Citroën Team
14 May	Grand Prix du Morbihan	Julien Simon (FRA)	Team TotalEnergies		Amaury Capiot (BEL)	Axel Zingle (FRA)	AG2R Citroën Team
15 May	Tro-Bro Léon	Hugo Hofstetter (FRA)	Arkéa–Samsic		Amaury Capiot (BEL)	Axel Zingle (FRA)	AG2R Citroën Team
21 May	Tour du Finistère	Julien Simon (FRA)	Team TotalEnergies		Julien Simon (FRA)	Axel Zingle (FRA)	AG2R Citroën Team
22 May	Boucles de l'Aulne	Idar Andersen (NOR)	Uno-X Pro Cycling Team		Julien Simon (FRA)	Axel Zingle (FRA)	Team TotalEnergies
31 May	Mercan'Tour Classic Alpes-Maritimes	Jakob Fuglsang (DEN)	Israel–Premier Tech		Julien Simon (FRA)	Axel Zingle (FRA)	AG2R Citroën Team
14 August	Polynormande	Franck Bonnamour (FRA)	B&B Hotels–KTM		Julien Simon (FRA)	Axel Zingle (FRA)	Team TotalEnergies
4 September	Tour du Doubs	Valentin Madouas (FRA)	Groupama–FDJ		Julien Simon (FRA)	Axel Zingle (FRA)	Team TotalEnergies
11 September	Grand Prix de Fourmies	Caleb Ewan (AUS)	Lotto–Soudal		Julien Simon (FRA)	Axel Zingle (FRA)	Team TotalEnergies
18 September	Grand Prix d'Isbergues	Arnaud Démare (FRA)	Groupama–FDJ		Julien Simon (FRA)	Luca Mozzato (ITA)	Team TotalEnergies
2 October	Tour de Vendée	Bryan Coquard (FRA)	Cofidis		Julien Simon (FRA)	Luca Mozzato (ITA)	Team TotalEnergies

== Cup standings ==
As of 2 October 2022, after the Tour de Vendée

All competing riders are eligible for the individual general classification, but only those younger than 25 on 1 January 2022 are eligible for the young rider classification. Additionally, only French teams are eligible for the teams classification.

=== Individual ===
Pos.	Rider	Team	Points
1	Julien Simon (FRA)	Team TotalEnergies	171
2	Amaury Capiot (BEL)	Arkéa–Samsic	133
3	Marc Sarreau (FRA)	AG2R Citroën Team	129
4	Luca Mozzato (ITA)	B&B Hotels–KTM	118
5	Clément Venturini (FRA)	AG2R Citroën Team	115
6	Bryan Coquard (FRA)	Cofidis	107
7	Matis Louvel (FRA)	Arkéa–Samsic	100
8	Sandy Dujardin (FRA)	Team TotalEnergies	89
9	Arnaud Démare (FRA)	Groupama–FDJ	85
10	Axel Zingle (FRA)	Cofidis	82

=== Young rider classification ===
Pos.	Rider	Team	Points
1	Luca Mozzato (ITA)	B&B Hotels–KTM	118
2	Matis Louvel (FRA)	Arkéa–Samsic	100
3	Sandy Dujardin (FRA)	Team TotalEnergies	89
4	Axel Zingle (FRA)	Cofidis	82
5	Valentin Ferron (FRA)	Team TotalEnergies	65
6	Idar Andersen (NOR)	Uno-X Pro Cycling Team	50
7	Mathieu Burgaudeau (FRA)	Team TotalEnergies	38
8	Pierre Barbier (FRA)	B&B Hotels–KTM	38
9	Jason Tesson (FRA)	St. Michel–Auber93	38
10	Arnaud De Lie (BEL)	Lotto–Soudal	36

=== Teams ===
Pos.	Team	Points
1	Team TotalEnergies	129
2	AG2R Citroën Team	126
3	Arkéa–Samsic	124
4	Cofidis	118
5	Groupama–FDJ	92
6	B&B Hotels–KTM	85
7	Team UC Nantes Atlantique	57
8	St. Michel–Auber93	56
9	Go Sport–Roubaix–Lille Métropole	55
10	Nice Métropole Côte d'Azur	44
