= 2019 French Road Cycling Cup =

Bicycle competition

The 2019 French Road Cycling Cup is the 28th edition of the French Road Cycling Cup. Compared to the previous season, the same 15 events were held.

The defending champion from the previous season is Hugo Hofstetter.

== Events ==
Date	Event	Winner	Team	Series leader	Leading Team
3 February	Grand Prix d'Ouverture La Marseillaise	Anthony Turgis (FRA)	Direct Énergie	Anthony Turgis (FRA)	Delko–Marseille Provence
24 March	Grand Prix de Denain	Mathieu van der Poel (NED)	Corendon–Circus	Mathieu van der Poel (NED)	Delko–Marseille Provence
30 March	Classic Loire Atlantique	Rudy Barbier (FRA)	Israel Cycling Academy	Marc Sarreau (FRA)	Natura4Ever–Roubaix–Lille Métropole
5 April	Route Adélie	Marc Sarreau (FRA)	Groupama–FDJ	Marc Sarreau (FRA)	Natura4Ever–Roubaix–Lille Métropole
7 April	La Roue Tourangelle	Lionel Taminiaux (BEL)	Wallonie Bruxelles	Marc Sarreau (FRA)	AG2R La Mondiale
16 April	Paris–Camembert	Benoît Cosnefroy (FRA)	AG2R La Mondiale	Marc Sarreau (FRA)	AG2R La Mondiale
20 April	Tour du Finistère	Julien Simon (FRA)	Cofidis	Marc Sarreau (FRA)	AG2R La Mondiale
22 April	Tro-Bro Léon	Andrea Vendrame (ITA)	Androni Giocattoli–Sidermec	Marc Sarreau (FRA)	Arkéa–Samsic
1 June	Grand Prix de Plumelec-Morbihan	Benoît Cosnefroy (FRA)	AG2R La Mondiale	Marc Sarreau (FRA)	Arkéa–Samsic
2 June	Boucles de l'Aulne	Alexis Gougeard (FRA)	AG2R La Mondiale	Marc Sarreau (FRA)	AG2R La Mondiale
18 August	Polynormande	Benoît Cosnefroy (FRA)	AG2R La Mondiale	Marc Sarreau (FRA)	AG2R La Mondiale
8 September	Grand Prix de Fourmies	Pascal Ackermann (GER)	Bora–Hansgrohe	Marc Sarreau (FRA)	AG2R La Mondiale
15 September	Tour du Doubs	Stefan Küng (SWI)	Groupama–FDJ	Marc Sarreau (FRA)	AG2R La Mondiale
22 September	Grand Prix d'Isbergues	Mads Pedersen (DEN)	Trek–Segafredo	Marc Sarreau (FRA)	AG2R La Mondiale
6 October	Tour de Vendée	Marc Sarreau (FRA)	Groupama–FDJ	Marc Sarreau (FRA)	AG2R La Mondiale

== Race results ==
=== Grand Prix d'Ouverture La Marseillaise ===
Result
Rank	Rider	Team	Time
1	Anthony Turgis (FRA)	Direct Énergie	3h 39' 47"
2	Romain Combaud (FRA)	Delko–Marseille Provence	+ 0"
3	Tom Van Asbroeck (BEL)	Israel Cycling Academy	+ 23"
4	Julien Trarieux (FRA)	Delko–Marseille Provence	+ 23"
5	Zico Waeytens (BEL)	Cofidis	+ 23"
6	Lilian Calmejane (FRA)	Direct Énergie	+ 23"
7	Clément Venturini (FRA)	AG2R La Mondiale	+ 23"
8	Milan Menten (BEL)	Sport Vlaanderen–Baloise	+ 23"
9	Kévin Le Cunff (FRA)	St. Michel–Auber93	+ 23"
10	Aimé De Gendt (BEL)	Wanty–Gobert	+ 23"
11	Amaury Capiot (BEL)	Sport Vlaanderen–Baloise	+ 23"
12	Samuel Dumoulin (FRA)	AG2R La Mondiale	+ 23"
13	Julien Simon (FRA)	Cofidis	+ 23"
14	Baptiste Planckaert (BEL)	Wallonie Bruxelles	+ 23"
15	Anthony Maldonado (FRA)	St. Michel–Auber93	+ 23"

=== Grand Prix de Denain ===
Result
Rank	Rider	Team	Time
1	Mathieu van der Poel (NED)	Corendon–Circus	4h 21' 39"
2	Marc Sarreau (FRA)	Groupama–FDJ	+ 3"
3	Timothy Dupont (BEL)	Wanty–Gobert	+ 3"
4	Matteo Moschetti (ITA)	Trek–Segafredo	+ 3"
5	Emiel Vermeulen (BEL)	Natura4Ever–Roubaix–Lille Métropole	+ 3"
6	Justin Jules (FRA)	Wallonie Bruxelles	+ 3"
7	Pierre Barbier (FRA)	Natura4Ever–Roubaix–Lille Métropole	+ 3"
8	Bram Welten (NED)	Arkéa–Samsic	+ 3"
9	Samuel Dumoulin (FRA)	AG2R La Mondiale	+ 3"
10	Romain Cardis (FRA)	Direct Énergie	+ 3"
11	Milan Menten (BEL)	Sport Vlaanderen–Baloise	+ 3"
12	Jonas van Genechten (BEL)	Vital Concept–B&B Hotels	+ 3"
13	Mattia Frapporti (ITA)	Androni Giocattoli–Sidermec	+ 3"
14	Marco Mathis (GER)	Cofidis	+ 3"
15	Andreas Stokbro (DEN)	Riwal Readynez	+ 3"

=== Classic Loire Atlantique ===
Result
Rank	Rider	Team	Time
1	Rudy Barbier (FRA)	Israel Cycling Academy	4h 28' 10"
2	Marc Sarreau (FRA)	Groupama–FDJ	+ 0"
3	Rory Townsend (IRL)	Canyon dhb p/b Bloor Homes	+ 0"
4	Adam de Vos (CAN)	Rally UHC Cycling	+ 0"
5	Jonathan Hivert (FRA)	Direct Énergie	+ 0"
6	Kévin Reza (FRA)	Vital Concept–B&B Hotels	+ 0"
7	Gianni Marchand (BEL)	Cibel–Cebon	+ 0"
8	Alexandre Geniez (FRA)	AG2R La Mondiale	+ 0"
9	Kévin Le Cunff (FRA)	St. Michel–Auber93	+ 0"
10	Thibault Ferasse (FRA)	Natura4Ever–Roubaix–Lille Métropole	+ 0"
11	Julien Antomarchi (FRA)	Natura4Ever–Roubaix–Lille Métropole	+ 0"
12	Bruno Armirail (FRA)	Groupama–FDJ	+ 3"
13	Thomas Stewart (GBR)	Canyon dhb p/b Bloor Homes	+ 7"
14	Jérémy Leveau (FRA)	Delko–Marseille Provence	+ 7"
15	Andrea Vendrame (ITA)	Androni Giocattoli–Sidermec	+ 7"

=== Route Adélie ===
Result
Rank	Rider	Team	Time
1	Marc Sarreau (FRA)	Groupama–FDJ	4h 52' 43"
2	Bram Welten (NED)	Arkéa–Samsic	+ 0"
3	Clément Venturini (FRA)	AG2R La Mondiale	+ 0"
4	Nelson Soto (COL)	Caja Rural–Seguros RGA	+ 1"
5	Eduard-Michael Grosu (ROM)	Delko–Marseille Provence	+ 1"
6	Pierre Barbier (FRA)	Natura4Ever–Roubaix–Lille Métropole	+ 3"
7	Lionel Taminiaux (BEL)	Wallonie Bruxelles	+ 3"
8	Thomas Boudat (FRA)	Direct Énergie	+ 3"
9	Romain Feillu (FRA)	St. Michel–Auber93	+ 3"
10	Julien Simon (FRA)	Cofidis	+ 3"
11	Roland Thalmann (SUI)	Team Vorarlberg Santic	+ 3"
12	Romain Hardy (FRA)	Arkéa–Samsic	+ 3"
13	Quentin Jaurégui (FRA)	AG2R La Mondiale	+ 3"
14	Mattia Frapporti (ITA)	Androni Giocattoli–Sidermec	+ 3"
15	Cyril Barthe (FRA)	Euskadi–Murias	+ 3"

=== La Roue Tourangelle ===
Result
Rank	Rider	Team	Time
1	Lionel Taminiaux (BEL)	Wallonie Bruxelles	4h 23' 35"
2	Robin Carpenter (USA)	Rally UHC Cycling	+ 0"
3	Marc Sarreau (FRA)	Groupama–FDJ	+ 12"
4	Thomas Boudat (FRA)	Direct Énergie	+ 12"
5	Nacer Bouhanni (FRA)	Cofidis	+ 12"
6	Bryan Coquard (FRA)	Vital Concept–B&B Hotels	+ 14"
7	Baptiste Planckaert (BEL)	Wallonie Bruxelles	+ 14"
8	Samuel Dumoulin (FRA)	AG2R La Mondiale	+ 14"
9	Clément Russo (FRA)	Arkéa–Samsic	+ 14"
10	Kévin Le Cunff (FRA)	St. Michel–Auber93	+ 14"
11	Andrea Vendrame (ITA)	Androni Giocattoli–Sidermec	+ 14"
12	Anthony Maldonado (FRA)	St. Michel–Auber93	+ 14"
13	Fabien Schmidt (FRA)	Delko–Marseille Provence	+ 14"
14	Quentin Jaurégui (FRA)	AG2R La Mondiale	+ 14"
15	Pierre Barbier (FRA)	Natura4Ever–Roubaix–Lille Métropole	+ 14"

=== Paris–Camembert ===
Result
Rank	Rider	Team	Time
1	Benoît Cosnefroy (FRA)	AG2R La Mondiale	4h 29' 50"
2	Pierre-Luc Périchon (FRA)	Rally UHC Cycling	+ 3"
3	Quentin Jaurégui (FRA)	AG2R La Mondiale	+ 5"
4	Romain Hardy (FRA)	Arkéa–Samsic	+ 5"
5	Julien El Fares (FRA)	Delko–Marseille Provence	+ 5"
6	Mathijs Paasschens (NED)	Wallonie Bruxelles	+ 5"
7	Jérôme Cousin (FRA)	Total Direct Énergie	+ 5"
8	Kévin Geniets (LUX)	Groupama–FDJ	+ 5"
9	Élie Gesbert (FRA)	Arkéa–Samsic	+ 8"
10	Andrea Vendrame (ITA)	Androni Giocattoli–Sidermec	+ 37"
11	Amaury Capiot (BEL)	Sport Vlaanderen–Baloise	+ 37"
12	Lilian Calmejane (FRA)	Total Direct Énergie	+ 37"
13	Damien Touzé (FRA)	Cofidis	+ 37"
14	Clément Venturini (FRA)	AG2R La Mondiale	+ 37"
15	Julien Simon (FRA)	Cofidis	+ 37"

=== Tour du Finistère ===
Result
Rank	Rider	Team	Time
1	Julien Simon (FRA)	Cofidis	4h 42' 02"
2	Andrea Vendrame (ITA)	Androni Giocattoli–Sidermec	+ 0"
3	Baptiste Planckaert (BEL)	Wallonie Bruxelles	+ 0"
4	Frederik Backaert (BEL)	Wanty–Gobert	+ 0"
5	Guillaume Martin (FRA)	Wanty–Gobert	+ 3"
6	Benjamin Thomas (FRA)	Groupama–FDJ	+ 7"
7	Óscar Rodríguez (ESP)	Euskadi–Murias	+ 11"
8	Romain Hardy (FRA)	Arkéa–Samsic	+ 11"
9	Jonathan Hivert (FRA)	Total Direct Énergie	+ 11"
10	Dorian Godon (FRA)	AG2R La Mondiale	+ 11"
11	Kévin Le Cunff (FRA)	St. Michel–Auber93	+ 11"
12	Lilian Calmejane (FRA)	Total Direct Énergie	+ 11"
13	Guillaume Boivin (CAN)	Cofidis	+ 11"
14	Sébastien Reichenbach (SUI)	Groupama–FDJ	+ 11"
15	Quentin Jaurégui (FRA)	AG2R La Mondiale	+ 11"

=== Tro-Bro Léon ===
Result
Rank	Rider	Team	Time
1	Andrea Vendrame (ITA)	Androni Giocattoli–Sidermec	5h 00' 20"
2	Baptiste Planckaert (BEL)	Wallonie Bruxelles	+ 0"
3	Emil Vinjebo (DEN)	Riwal Readynez	+ 0"
4	Romain Hardy (FRA)	Arkéa–Samsic	+ 0"
5	Lilian Calmejane (FRA)	Total Direct Énergie	+ 0"
6	Marc Sarreau (FRA)	Groupama–FDJ	+ 0"
7	Mickaël Delage (FRA)	Groupama–FDJ	+ 0"
8	Kévin Le Cunff (FRA)	St. Michel–Auber93	+ 0"
9	Anthony Delaplace (FRA)	Arkéa–Samsic	+ 0"
10	Frederik Backaert (BEL)	Wanty–Gobert	+ 3"
11	Alexis Gougeard (FRA)	AG2R La Mondiale	+ 6"
12	Floris Gerts (NED)	Tarteletto–Isorex	+ 29"
13	Andreas Stokbro (DEN)	Riwal Readynez	+ 35"
14	Zak Dempster (AUS)	Israel Cycling Academy	+ 35"
15	Thomas Boudat (FRA)	Total Direct Énergie	+ 35"

=== Grand Prix de Plumelec-Morbihan ===
Result
Rank	Rider	Team	Time
1	Benoît Cosnefroy (FRA)	AG2R La Mondiale	4h 35' 27"
2	Jesús Herrada (ESP)	Cofidis	+ 0"
3	Odd Christian Eiking (NOR)	Wanty–Gobert	+ 0"
4	Kévin Le Cunff (FRA)	St. Michel–Auber93	+ 3"
5	Bryan Coquard (FRA)	Vital Concept–B&B Hotels	+ 3"
6	Guillaume Martin (FRA)	Wanty–Gobert	+ 3"
7	Andrea Pasqualon (ITA)	Wanty–Gobert	+ 5"
8	Julien El Fares (FRA)	Delko–Marseille Provence	+ 5"
9	Marco Tizza (ITA)	Amore & Vita–Prodir	+ 5"
10	Kévin Geniets (LUX)	Groupama–FDJ	+ 8"
11	Aaron Gate (NZL)	EvoPro Racing	+ 9"
12	Dimitri Peyskens (BEL)	Wallonie Bruxelles	+ 14"
13	Warren Barguil (FRA)	Arkéa–Samsic	+ 16"
14	Lilian Calmejane (FRA)	Total Direct Énergie	+ 21"
15	Xandro Meurisse (BEL)	Wanty–Gobert	+ 21"

=== Boucles de l'Aulne ===
Result
Rank	Rider	Team	Time
1	Alexis Gougeard (FRA)	AG2R La Mondiale	4h 14' 00"
2	Quentin Jaurégui (FRA)	AG2R La Mondiale	+ 1' 09"
3	Julien El Fares (FRA)	Delko–Marseille Provence	+ 1' 09"
4	Aurélien Paret-Peintre (FRA)	AG2R La Mondiale	+ 1' 09"
5	Xandro Meurisse (BEL)	Wanty–Gobert	+ 1' 09"
6	Kévin Geniets (LUX)	Groupama–FDJ	+ 1' 09"
7	Anthony Delaplace (FRA)	Arkéa–Samsic	+ 1' 09"
8	Dimitri Peyskens (BEL)	Wallonie Bruxelles	+ 1' 14"
9	Lorenzo Manzin (FRA)	Vital Concept–B&B Hotels	+ 2' 12"
10	Thibault Ferasse (FRA)	Natura4Ever–Roubaix–Lille Métropole	+ 2' 14"
11	Julien Simon (FRA)	Cofidis	+ 2' 15"
12	Paul Ourselin (FRA)	Total Direct Énergie	+ 2' 15"
13	Anthony Maldonado (FRA)	St. Michel–Auber93	+ 2' 15"
14	Mauricio Moreira (URU)	Caja Rural–Seguros RGA	+ 2' 15"
15	Romain Hardy (FRA)	Arkéa–Samsic	+ 2' 26"

=== Poly Normande ===
Result
Rank	Rider	Team	Time
1	Benoît Cosnefroy (FRA)	AG2R La Mondiale	3h 55' 19"
2	Valentin Ferron (FRA)	Total Direct Énergie	+ 2"
3	Damien Touzé (FRA)	Cofidis	+ 14"
4	Alexandre Delettre (FRA)	Delko–Marseille Provence	+ 14"
5	Aurélien Paret-Peintre (FRA)	AG2R La Mondiale	+ 14"
6	Yoann Paillot (FRA)	St. Michel–Auber93	+ 14"
7	Paul Ourselin (FRA)	Total Direct Énergie	+ 14"
8	Anthony Delaplace (FRA)	Arkéa–Samsic	+ 14"
9	Dimitri Claeys (BEL)	Cofidis	+ 1' 57"
10	Adrien Garel (FRA)	Vital Concept–B&B Hotels	+ 2' 45"
11	Adam Lewis (GB)	BEAT Cycling Club	+ 2' 45"
12	Alex Colman (BEL)	Canyon dhb p/b Bloor Homes	+ 2' 56"
13	Kévin Le Cunff (FRA)	St. Michel–Auber93	+ 2' 59"
14	Laurent Pichon (FRA)	Arkéa–Samsic	+ 2' 59"
15	Maxime Chevalier (FRA)	Vital Concept–B&B Hotels	+ 2' 59"

=== Grand Prix de Fourmies ===
Result
Rank	Rider	Team	Time

=== Tour du Doubs ===
Result
Rank	Rider	Team	Time

=== Grand Prix d'Isbergues ===
Result
Rank	Rider	Team	Time

=== Tour de Vendée ===
Result
Rank	Rider	Team	Time

== Final Cup standings ==
=== Individual ===
All competing riders are eligible for this classification.

Pos.	Rider	Team	Points
1	Marc Sarreau (FRA)	Groupama–FDJ	211
2	Benoît Cosnefroy (FRA)	AG2R La Mondiale	170
3	Andrea Vendrame (ITA)	Androni Giocattoli–Sidermec	102
4	Julien Simon (FRA)	Cofidis	94
5	Baptiste Planckaert (BEL)	Wallonie Bruxelles	80
6	Kévin Le Cunff (FRA)	St. Michel–Auber93	78
7	Bryan Coquard (FRA)	Vital Concept–B&B Hotels	77
8	Quentin Jaurégui (FRA)	AG2R La Mondiale	69
9	Lionel Taminiaux (BEL)	Wallonie Bruxelles	64
10	Christophe Laporte (FRA)	Cofidis	60

=== Young rider classification ===
All riders younger than 25 are eligible for this classification.

Pos.	Rider	Team	Points
1	Benoît Cosnefroy (FRA)	AG2R La Mondiale	170
2	Andrea Vendrame (ITA)	Androni Giocattoli–Sidermec	102
3	Quentin Jaurégui (FRA)	AG2R La Mondiale	69
4	Lionel Taminiaux (BEL)	Wallonie Bruxelles	64
5	Pierre Barbier (FRA)	Natura4Ever–Roubaix–Lille Métropole	54
6	Mathieu van der Poel (NED)	Corendon–Circus	50
7	Mads Pedersen (DEN)	Trek–Segafredo	50
8	Pascal Ackermann (GER)	Bora–Hansgrohe	50
9	Anthony Turgis (FRA)	Total Direct Énergie	50
10	Bram Welten (NED)	Arkéa–Samsic	47

=== Teams ===
Only French teams are eligible to be classified in the teams classification.

Pos.	Team	Points
1	AG2R La Mondiale	125
2	Arkéa–Samsic	107
3	Cofidis	103
4	Groupama–FDJ	97
5	Natura4Ever–Roubaix–Lille Métropole	91
6	St. Michel–Auber93	87
7	Delko–Marseille Provence	80
8	Total Direct Énergie	77
9	Vital Concept–B&B Hotels	60
10	Équipe de France U23	11
