= 2019 Grand Prix de Denain =

Grand Prix de Denain
2019 UCI Europe Tour 2019 French Road Cycling Cup

Race details
- Dates: 24 March 2019
- Distance: 198 km (123.0 mi)
- Winning time: 4h 31' 29"

Results
	Winner	Mathieu van der Poel (NED)	(Corendon–Circus)
	Second	Marc Sarreau (FRA)	(Groupama–FDJ)
	Third	Timothy Dupont (BEL)	(Wanty–Gobert)

The 2019 Grand Prix de Denain – Porte du Hainaut was the 61st edition of the Grand Prix de Denain one-day road cycling race, held annually around the town of Denain in northern France. Since 2018, the race has traversed several sectors of cobbled roads, including one used in Paris–Roubaix. The Grand Prix de Denain was ranked 1.HC in the 2019 UCI Europe Tour, and it was the second race in the 2019 French Road Cycling Cup series.

Dutch rider Mathieu van der Poel, of the Corendon–Circus team, won the race. Van der Poel attacked from a leading group of three riders, including Alex Kirsch of Luxembourg and Trek–Segafredo and Estonian Mihkel Räim of Israel Cycling Academy, and rode over eight kilometers solo to the finish. Kirsch and Räim were caught by the peloton, and Marc Sarreau of Groupama–FDJ won the reduced bunch sprint for second place.

== Teams ==
Twenty-two teams competed in the 2019 Grand Prix de Denain, including three UCI WorldTeams, fifteen UCI Professional Continental teams, and four UCI Continental teams.

UCI WorldTeams

- AG2R La Mondiale
- Groupama–FDJ
- Trek–Segafredo

UCI Professional Continental teams

- Androni Giocattoli–Sidermec
- Arkéa–Samsic
- Burgos BH
- Cofidis
- Corendon–Circus
- Delko–Marseille Provence
- Israel Cycling Academy
- Riwal Readynez
- Roompot–Charles
- Sport Vlaanderen–Baloise
- Vital Concept–B&B Hotels
- Wallonie Bruxelles
- Wanty–Gobert
- Direct Énergie

UCI Continental teams

- Amore & Vita–Prodir
- Natura4Ever–Roubaix–Lille Métropole
- St. Michel–Auber93
- Development Team Sunweb
- Tarteletto–Isorex

== Result ==
Result
Rank	Rider	Team	Time
1	Mathieu van der Poel (NED)	Corendon–Circus	4h 21' 39"
2	Marc Sarreau (FRA)	Groupama–FDJ	+ 03"
3	Timothy Dupont (BEL)	Wanty–Gobert	+ 03"
4	Matteo Moschetti (ITA)	Trek–Segafredo	+ 03"
5	Emiel Vermeulen (BEL)	Natura4Ever–Roubaix–Lille Métropole	+ 03"
6	Justin Jules (FRA)	Wallonie Bruxelles	+ 03"
7	Pierre Barbier (FRA)	Natura4Ever–Roubaix–Lille Métropole	+ 03"
8	Bram Welten (NED)	Arkéa–Samsic	+ 03"
9	Samuel Dumoulin (FRA)	AG2R La Mondiale	+ 03"
10	Romain Cardis (FRA)	Direct Énergie	+ 03"
