= Capiot =

Capiot is a surname. Notable people with the surname include:

- Amaury Capiot (born 1993), Belgian cyclist, son of Johan
- Johan Capiot (born 1964), Belgian cyclist, father of Amaury
