= 2022 Grand Prix La Marseillaise =

French cycling race

2022 UCI Europe Tour 2022 French Road Cycling Cup

Race details
- Dates: 30 January 2022
- Stages: 1
- Distance: 174.3 km (108.3 mi)
- Winning time: 4h 31' 11"

Results
	Winner	Amaury Capiot (BEL)	(Arkéa–Samsic)
	Second	Mads Pedersen (DEN)	(Trek–Segafredo)
	Third	Kiko Galván (ESP)	(Equipo Kern Pharma)
	Mountains	Nicolas Debeaumarché (FRA)	(St. Michel–Auber93)
	Youth	Kiko Galván (ESP)	(Equipo Kern Pharma)

The 2022 Grand Prix Cycliste de Marseille La Marseillaise was the 43rd edition of the Grand Prix La Marseillaise one-day road cycling race. It was held on 30 January 2022 as a category 1.1 race on the 2022 UCI Europe Tour, and as the first event of the 2022 French Road Cycling Cup.

The 174.3-kilometre (108.3 mi) race took place in and around Marseille in southeastern France, starting from the village of Château-Gombert in the northeastern part of the city and finishing in downtown Marseille next to the Stade Vélodrome. The race course was undulating, with nine marked climbs along the route totalling approximately 3,000 metres (9,800 ft) of elevation. Three of these climbs, the Pas de la Couelle, the Col de l'Espigoulier, and the Route des Crêtes, offered points for the mountains classification for the first three riders to crest their respective summits. The last climb, the Col de la Gineste, crested with 9.5 kilometres (5.9 mi) left before a downhill run-in to the finish line.

In the finishing sprint, Amaury Capiot took his first professional victory, sprinting out of the slipstream of Mads Pedersen, who held on for second. Edvald Boasson Hagen, who had been one of the first to start his sprint, was passed by Kiko Galván for third, but managed to hold off fast-finishing Benoît Cosnefroy, winner of the 2020 edition, for fourth.

== Teams ==
Nine of the 18 UCI WorldTeams, eight UCI ProTeams, and four UCI Continental teams made up the 21 teams that participated in the race. All but three of these teams entered a full squad of seven riders. Cofidis and Intermarché–Wanty–Gobert Matériaux each entered six riders, while Lotto–Soudal entered five. Lotto–Soudal had originally entered six riders as well, but Sylvain Moniquet was forced to withdraw due to a positive COVID-19 test result days before the race. Trek–Segafredo was reduced to six riders with one non-starter, while UAE Team Emirates was reduced to five riders with two non-starters. In total, 140 riders started the race, of which 130 finished.

UCI WorldTeams

- AG2R Citroën Team
- Cofidis
- EF Education–EasyPost
- Groupama–FDJ
- Intermarché–Wanty–Gobert Matériaux
- Israel–Premier Tech
- Lotto–Soudal
- Trek–Segafredo
- UAE Team Emirates

UCI ProTeams

- Arkéa–Samsic
- B&B Hotels–KTM
- Bingoal Pauwels Sauces WB
- Caja Rural–Seguros RGA
- Equipo Kern Pharma
- Sport Vlaanderen–Baloise
- Team TotalEnergies
- Uno-X Pro Cycling Team

UCI Continental Teams

- Go Sport–Roubaix–Lille Métropole
- Nice Métropole Côte d'Azur
- St. Michel–Auber93
- Team UC Nantes Atlantique

== Result ==
Result (1–10)
Rank	Rider	Team	Time
1	Amaury Capiot (BEL)	Arkéa–Samsic	4h 31' 11"
2	Mads Pedersen (DEN)	Trek–Segafredo	+ 0"
3	Kiko Galván (ESP)	Equipo Kern Pharma	+ 0"
4	Edvald Boasson Hagen (NOR)	Team TotalEnergies	+ 0"
5	Benoît Cosnefroy (FRA)	AG2R Citroën Team	+ 0"
6	Bryan Coquard (FRA)	Cofidis	+ 0"
7	Georg Zimmermann (GER)	Intermarché–Wanty–Gobert Matériaux	+ 0"
8	Diego Ulissi (ITA)	UAE Team Emirates	+ 0"
9	Alessandro Covi (ITA)	UAE Team Emirates	+ 0"
10	Alberto Bettiol (ITA)	EF Education–EasyPost	+ 0"

Mountains classification (1–4)
Rank	Rider	Team	Points
1	Nicolas Debeaumarché (FRA)	St. Michel–Auber93	8
2	Danny van der Tuuk (NED)	Equipo Kern Pharma	6
3	Alexis Gougeard (FRA)	B&B Hotels–KTM	3
4	Louis Blouwe (BEL)	Bingoal Pauwels Sauces WB	1

Young rider classification (1–10)
Rank	Rider	Team	Time
1	Kiko Galván (ESP)	Equipo Kern Pharma	4h 31' 11"
2	Georg Zimmermann (GER)	Intermarché–Wanty–Gobert Matériaux	+ 0"
3	Alessandro Covi (ITA)	UAE Team Emirates	+ 0"
4	Fernando Barceló (ESP)	Caja Rural–Seguros RGA	+ 0"
5	Clément Champoussin (FRA)	AG2R Citroën Team	+ 0"
6	Thibault Guernalec (FRA)	Arkéa–Samsic	+ 0"
7	Luc Wirtgen (LUX)	Bingoal Pauwels Sauces WB	+ 0"
8	Martí Márquez (ESP)	Equipo Kern Pharma	+ 0"
9	Rémy Rochas (FRA)	Cofidis	+ 0"
10	Tobias Halland Johannessen (NOR)	Uno-X Pro Cycling Team	+ 0"
