= 2022 Grand Prix de Denain =

French cycling race

2022 UCI ProSeries 2022 French Road Cycling Cup

Race details
- Dates: 17 March 2022
- Stages: 1
- Distance: 200.3 km (124.5 mi)
- Winning time: 4h 42' 24"

Results
	Winner	Max Walscheid (GER)	(Cofidis)
	Second	Dries De Bondt (BEL)	(Alpecin–Fenix)
	Third	Adrien Petit (FRA)	(Intermarché–Wanty–Gobert Matériaux)

The 2022 Grand Prix de Denain – Porte du Hainaut was the 63rd edition of the Grand Prix de Denain one-day road cycling race. It was held on 17 March 2022 as a category 1.Pro race on the 2022 UCI ProSeries calendar. It was also the second event of the 2022 French Road Cycling Cup. After the 2021 edition was postponed to September by COVID-19 precautions, the race returned to its usual spring timeslot.

The race, which was 200.3 kilometres (124.5 mi) long, took place in and around Denain in northern France. After riders covered a 39.6-kilometre (24.6 mi) circuit to the north of Denain and made the first passage across the finish line, they then took on a larger, 60.4-kilometre (37.5 mi) circuit to the south of Denain. After their second passage across the finish line, riders completed two laps of a 50-kilometre (31 mi) circuit that featured 10.4 kilometres (6.5 mi) of cobblestones spread across six sections. The last of these sections, from Avesnes-le-Sec to Hordain, concluded 10.8 kilometres (6.7 mi) before the finish line.

Early in the stage, a five-rider group went off the front to establish the main breakaway of the race. With around 70 kilometres (43 mi) left, the group began to break up while in the peloton behind, there were several attacks to try to bridge the gap, but the peloton absorbed all of the escapees with around 30 kilometres (19 mi) left. Shortly thereafter, the INEOS Grenadiers trio of Jhonatan Narváez, Magnus Sheffield, and Ben Turner launched another break, and they were joined by Primož Roglič (Team Jumbo–Visma) and Damien Touzé (AG2R Citroën Team). The quintet established a maximum lead of around half a minute before Groupama–FDJ and Intermarché–Wanty–Gobert Matériaux took control at the front of the peloton to close the gap. With under 2 kilometres (1.2 mi) left, the lead group was brought back by the peloton; Narváez tried another attack but was brought back inside the final kilometre. In the final sprint, Adrien Petit led out the sprint before Max Walscheid emerged from his slipstream in the final 100 metres (330 ft) and held off Dries De Bondt for the win.

== Teams ==
Eight of the 18 UCI WorldTeams, eight UCI ProTeams, and four UCI Continental teams made up the 20 teams that participated in the race. Eight teams did not enter a full squad of seven riders; AG2R Citroën Team, Arkéa–Samsic, Bardiani–CSF–Faizanè, Bora–Hansgrohe, Go Sport–Roubaix–Lille Métropole, and Intermarché–Wanty–Gobert Matériaux each entered six riders, while INEOS Grenadiers and Team TotalEnergies each entered five riders. In total, 130 riders started the race, of which 90 finished.

UCI WorldTeams

- AG2R Citroën Team
- Bora–Hansgrohe
- Cofidis
- Groupama–FDJ
- INEOS Grenadiers
- Intermarché–Wanty–Gobert Matériaux
- Team Jumbo–Visma
- UAE Team Emirates

UCI ProTeams

- Alpecin–Fenix
- Arkéa–Samsic
- B&B Hotels–KTM
- Bardiani–CSF–Faizanè
- Bingoal Pauwels Sauces WB
- Sport Vlaanderen–Baloise
- Team TotalEnergies
- Uno-X Pro Cycling Team

UCI Continental Teams

- Go Sport–Roubaix–Lille Métropole
- Nice Métropole Côte d'Azur
- St. Michel–Auber93
- Team UC Nantes Atlantique

== Result ==
Result (1–10)
Rank	Rider	Team	Time
1	Max Walscheid (GER)	Cofidis	4h 42' 24"
2	Dries De Bondt (BEL)	Alpecin–Fenix	+ 0"
3	Adrien Petit (FRA)	Intermarché–Wanty–Gobert Matériaux	+ 0"
4	Pierre Barbier (FRA)	B&B Hotels–KTM	+ 0"
5	Marc Sarreau (FRA)	AG2R Citroën Team	+ 0"
6	Sandy Dujardin (FRA)	Team TotalEnergies	+ 0"
7	Amaury Capiot (BEL)	Arkéa–Samsic	+ 0"
8	Samuel Leroux (FRA)	Go Sport–Roubaix–Lille Métropole	+ 0"
9	Robbe Ghys (BEL)	Sport Vlaanderen–Baloise	+ 0"
10	Bram Welten (NED)	Groupama–FDJ	+ 0"
