= 2022 Grand Prix de Fourmies =

2021 Grand Prix de Fourmies
2021 UCI ProSeries

Race details
- Dates: 11 September 2022
- Stages: 1
- Distance: 197.6 km (122.8 mi)
- Winning time: 4h 27' 07"

Results
	Winner	Caleb Ewan (AUS)	(Lotto–Soudal)
	Second	Dylan Groenewegen (NED)	(Team BikeExchange–Jayco)
	Third	Amaury Capiot (BEL)	(Arkéa–Samsic)

The 2022 Grand Prix de Fourmies was the 89th edition of the Grand Prix de Fourmies, a one-day road cycling race in and around Fourmies in northern France. It was also the fifteenth event of the 2022 French Road Cycling Cup.

== Teams ==
Eleven of the eighteen UCI WorldTeams, seven UCI ProTeams, and five UCI Continental teams made up the twenty-three teams that participated in the race. All teams fielded a full squad of seven riders.

UCI WorldTeams

- AG2R Citroën Team
- Cofidis
- EF Education–EasyPost
- Groupama–FDJ
- Intermarché–Wanty–Gobert Matériaux
- Israel–Premier Tech
- Lotto–Soudal
- Quick-Step Alpha Vinyl Team
- Team BikeExchange–Jayco
- Trek–Segafredo
- UAE Team Emirates

UCI ProTeams

- Alpecin–Deceuninck
- Arkéa–Samsic
- B&B Hotels–KTM
- Bingoal Pauwels Sauces WB
- Sport Vlaanderen–Baloise
- Team TotalEnergies
- Uno-X Pro Cycling Team

UCI Continental Teams

- Go Sport–Roubaix–Lille Métropole
- Nice Métropole Côte d'Azur
- St. Michel–Auber93
- Team Corratec
- Team UC Nantes Atlantique

== Result ==
Result
Rank	Rider	Team	Time
1	Caleb Ewan (AUS)	Lotto–Soudal	4h 27' 07"
2	Dylan Groenewegen (NED)	Team BikeExchange–Jayco	+ 0"
3	Amaury Capiot (BEL)	Arkéa–Samsic	+ 0"
4	Stefano Oldani (ITA)	Alpecin–Deceuninck	+ 0"
5	Jason Tesson (FRA)	St. Michel–Auber93	+ 0"
6	Yves Lampaert (BEL)	Quick-Step Alpha Vinyl Team	+ 0"
7	Julien Simon (FRA)	Team TotalEnergies	+ 0"
8	Marc Sarreau (FRA)	AG2R Citroën Team	+ 0"
9	Emīls Liepiņš (LAT)	Trek–Segafredo	+ 0"
10	Luca Mozzato (ITA)	B&B Hotels–KTM	+ 0"
