= 2012 UCI Cyclo-cross World Championships – Men's junior race =

Men's Junior Cyclo-cross Race
2012 UCI Cyclo-cross World Championships
- Rainbow jersey

Race details
- Dates: January 28, 2012
- Stages: 1
- Distance: 17.72 km (11.01 mi)
- Winning time: 43' 36"

Medalists
	Gold	Mathieu van der Poel (NED)
	Silver	Wout van Aert (BEL)
	Bronze	Quentin Jaurégui (FRA)

This event was held on Saturday 28 January 2012 as part of the 2012 UCI Cyclo-cross World Championships. Six laps had to be completed, totalling up to 17.72 kilometre.

== Ranking ==
Rank	Cyclist	Time
Gold medal	Mathieu van der Poel (NED)	43' 36"
Silver medal	Wout van Aert (BEL)	+ 8"
Bronze medal	Quentin Jaurégui (FRA)	+ 21"
4	Quinten Hermans (BEL)	s.t.
5	Daan Soete (BEL)	s.t.
6	Yorben Van Tichelt (BEL)	+ 48"
7	Silvio Herklotz (GER)	+ 1'00"
8	Daan Hoeyberghs (BEL)	+ 1'25"
9	Romain Seigle (FRA)	+1'32"
10	Victor Koretzky (FRA)	+ 2'11"
11	Anthony Turgis (FRA)	+ 2'23"
12	Dominic Zumstein (SUI)	+ 2'24"
13	Gioele Bertolini (ITA)	+ 2'40"
14	Andrew Dillman (USA)	+ 3'08"
15	Felix Drumm (GER)	+ 3'11"
16	Tim Ariesen (NED)	+ 3'12"
17	Logan Owen (USA)	+ 3'15"
18	Martijn Budding (NED)	+ 3'16"
19	Toki Sawada (JPN)	s.t.
20	Marco König (GER)	+ 3'30"
21	Andri Frischknecht (SUI)	+ 4'05"
22	Stan Wijkel (NED)	+ 4'07"
23	Dylan Kowalski (FRA)	s.t.
24	Jan Brezna (CZE)	s.t.
25	Pjotr Van Beek (NED)	+ 4'31"
26	Michal Paluta (POL)	+ 4'43"
27	Jan Vastl (CZE)	+ 4'44"
28	Karel Pokorny (CZE)	+ 4'45"
29	Emil Linde (SWE)	+ 4'57"
30	Dominic Grab (SUI)	+ 5'06"
31	Koen Weijers (NED)	+ 5'34"
32	Jose Manuel Ribera (ESP)	+ 5'37"
33	Kevin Suarez Fernandez (ESP)	+ 5'43"
34	Curtis White (USA)	+ 5'45"
35	Piotr Konwa (POL)	+ 5'59"
36	Nadir Colledani (ITA)	s.t.
37	Dennis Wahlqvist (SWE)	s.t.
38	Steffen Müller (GER)	+ 6'28"
39	Joseph Moses (GBR)	+ 6'35"
40	Yohan Patry (CAN)	+ 6'50"
41	Kota Yokoyama (JPN)	+ 6'52"
42	Michimasa Nakai (JPN)	+ 7'08"
43	Luca De Nicola (ITA)	+ 7'10"
44	Johannes Siemermann (GER)	+ 7'15"
45	Patryk Stosz (POL)	– 1 LAP
46	Simon Vozar (SVK)	– 1 LAP
47	Riccardo Redaelli (ITA)	– 1 LAP
48	Tobin Ortenblad (USA)	– 1 LAP
49	Jaime Campo Pernia (ESP)	– 2 LAPS
50	Samuel Beaudoin (CAN)	– 2 LAPS
51	Ondrej Glajza (SVK)	– 2 LAPS
52	Sven Fritsch (LUX)	– 2 LAPS
53	Mateusz Grabis (POL)	– 2 LAPS
54	Francesco Pedante (ITA)	– 2 LAPS
55	Richard Cypress Gorry (USA)	– 3 LAPS
56	Tobiasz Lis (POL)	– 3 LAPS
57	Zygimantas Baikstys (LIT)	– 4 LAPS
