= Mathieu van der Poel =

Dutch cyclist

- Van der Poel at the start of the 2026 Milan-San Remo.

Personal information
- Full name: Mathieu van der Poel
- Nicknames: MVDP; The Flying Dutchman
- Born: 19 January 1995 (age 31) Kapellen, Belgium
- Height: 1.84 m (6 ft 0 in)
- Weight: 75 kg (165 lb)

Cycling career
- Sport: Cycling
- Current team: Alpecin–Premier Tech
- Disciplines: Cyclo-cross; Mountain biking; Road; Gravel
- Role: Rider
- Rider type: Puncheur (road); Classics specialist (road); Cross-country (mountain biking)

Amateur team
- 2012–2013: IKO Enertherm–BKCP

Professional team
- 2014–: BKCP–Powerplus

Major wins
- Cyclo-cross World Championships (2015, 2019, 2020, 2021, 2023, 2024, 2025, 2026) European Championships (2017–2019) National Championships (2015–2020) World Cup (2017–18, 2025–26) 51 individual wins (2014–15—2020–21, 2022–23—2025–26) Superprestige (2014–15, 2016–17, 2017–18, 2018–19) Trophy (2017–18, 2018–19) Gravel World Championships (2024) Mountain bike European XC Championships (2019) National XC Championships (2018) XC World Cup 3 individual wins (2019) Road Grand Tours Tour de France 4 individual stages (2021, 2025, 2026) Giro d'Italia 1 individual stage (2022) Combativity award (2022) Stage races BinckBank Tour (2020) Tour of Belgium (2023) Tour of Britain (2019) One-day races and Classics World Road Race Championships (2023) National Road Race Championships (2018, 2020) Milan–San Remo (2023, 2025) Tour of Flanders (2020, 2022, 2024) Paris–Roubaix (2023, 2024, 2025) Amstel Gold Race (2019) Strade Bianche (2021) E3 Saxo Classic (2024, 2025, 2026) Dwars door Vlaanderen (2019, 2022) Omloop Het Nieuwsblad (2026) Brabantse Pijl (2019) GP de Denain (2019) GP de Wallonie (2022) Super 8 Classic (2023)
Medal record
Representing the Netherlands
Men's cyclo-cross
World Championships
Gold medal – first place	2012 Koksijde	Junior
Gold medal – first place	2013 Louisville	Junior
Gold medal – first place	2015 Tábor	Elite
Gold medal – first place	2019 Bogense	Elite
Gold medal – first place	2020 Dübendorf	Elite
Gold medal – first place	2021 Ostend	Elite
Gold medal – first place	2023 Hoogerheide	Elite
Gold medal – first place	2024 Tábor	Elite
Gold medal – first place	2025 Liévin	Elite
Gold medal – first place	2026 Hulst	Elite
Silver medal – second place	2017 Bieles	Elite
Bronze medal – third place	2014 Hoogerheide	Under-23
Bronze medal – third place	2018 Valkenburg	Elite
European Championships
Gold medal – first place	2011 Lucca	Junior
Gold medal – first place	2012 Ipswich	Junior
Gold medal – first place	2017 Tábor	Elite
Gold medal – first place	2018 Rosmalen	Elite
Gold medal – first place	2019 Silvelle	Elite
Silver medal – second place	2013 Mladá Boleslav	Under-23
Silver medal – second place	2016 Pontchâteau	Elite
Men's road cycling
World Championships
Gold medal – first place	2013 Florence	Junior road race
Gold medal – first place	2023 Glasgow	Elite road race
Bronze medal – third place	2024 Zurich	Elite road race
Bronze medal – third place	2026 Montreal	Elite road race
European Championships
Silver medal – second place	2018 Glasgow	Elite road race
Men's mountain bike racing
World Championships
Bronze medal – third place	2018 Lenzerheide	Elite cross-country
European Championships
Gold medal – first place	2019 Brno	Elite cross-country
Men's gravel bicycle racing
World Championships
Gold medal – first place	2024 Flanders	Elite
Bronze medal – third place	2022 Veneto	Elite

Mathieu van der Poel (born 19 January 1995) is a Belgian-born Dutch professional cyclist who has ridden, since 2014, for the UCI WorldTeam Alpecin–Premier Tech. He competes in cyclo-cross, mountain biking, gravel and road racing disciplines of the sport.

Van der Poel has won eight Cyclo-cross World Championships (2015, 2019, 2020, 2021, 2023, 2024, 2025, 2026), one Gravel World Championship (2024) and one Road World Championship (2023), becoming the only Men's World Champion in three different cycling disciplines. He has also won multiple stages at grand tours and has numerous classics victories, including winning both the Tour of Flanders and Paris–Roubaix three times, and Milan–San Remo twice. His rivalry with Wout van Aert is considered to be one of the great rivalries in the sport.

== Early and personal life ==
Born in Kapellen, Van der Poel comes from a family of professional cyclists; his brother David was also prominent in cyclo-cross racing, winning the 2013 National Under-23 Championships in Hilvarenbeek. His father, Adri, is a former six-time Dutch National Champion and the World Cyclo-cross Champion for 1996; he was also twice a stage winner at the Tour de France and a winner of several Classics during his career.

His maternal grandfather was French cyclist Raymond Poulidor, winner of the 1964 Vuelta a España, who also finished the Tour de France in runner-up position three times and in third place five times.

== Career ==
=== Junior career ===
==== Dominance in cyclo-cross and first road race wins ====
Van der Poel made his debut in cyclo-cross during the 2009–10 season, competing in the novices ranks. He won several local races, and at the National Championships in Heerlen, Van der Poel finished in second place, fifteen seconds behind champion Erik Kramer. During the 2010–11 season, Van der Poel won all of the races that he contested; he also combined this with racing on the road in the summer of 2011, and won the Dutch Novice Time Trial Championships in Zwartemeer. The following winter, Van der Poel advanced to the junior ranks, and was immediately dominant in this season; out of all the races he contested, he failed to finish first on only four occasions. He also claimed the junior titles at National, European, and World Championship level, each one by a convincing margin.

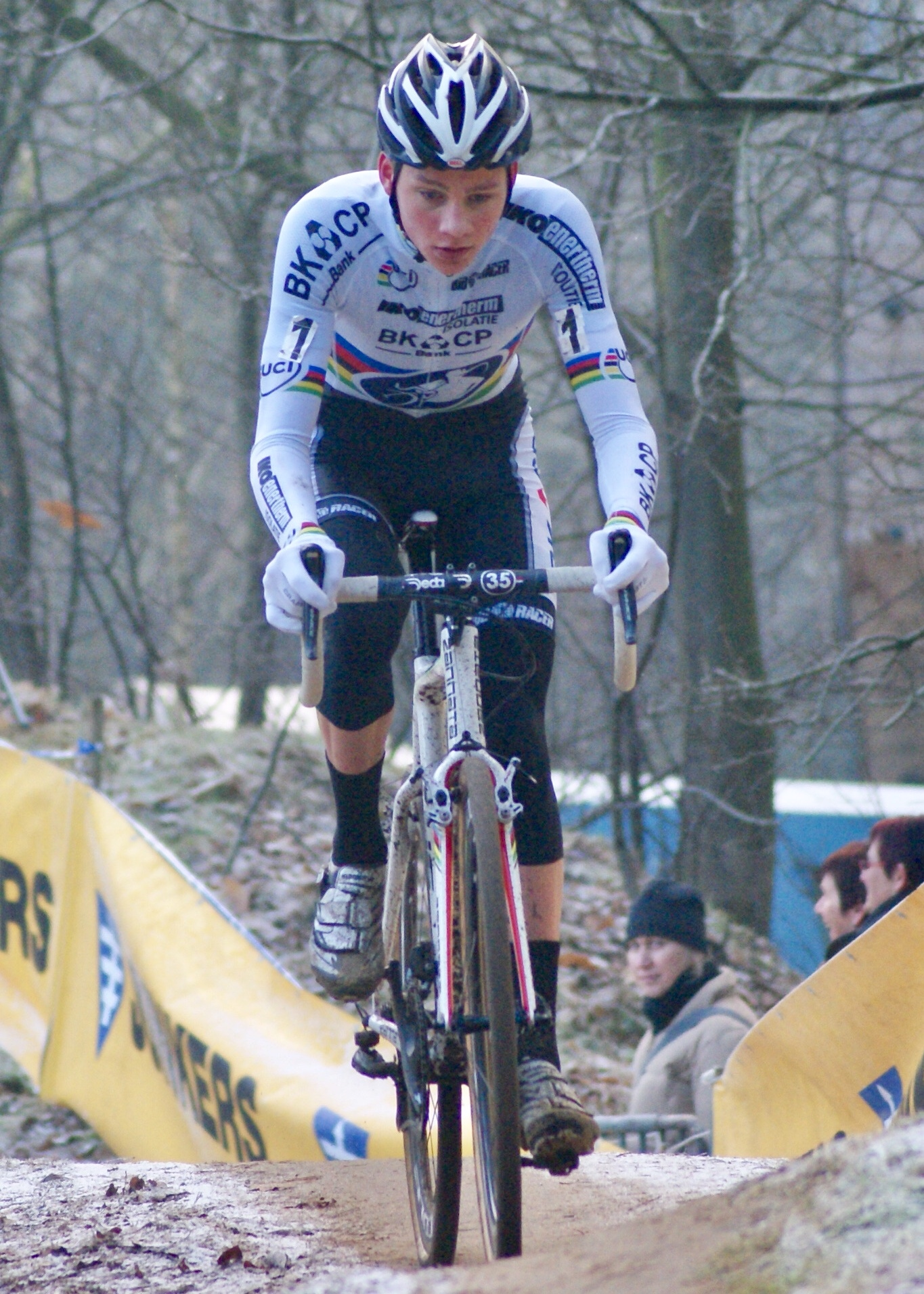
Van der Poel at the 2013 Krawatencross

During the 2012 road season, Van der Poel got his first general classification victory at the Ronde des Vallées; he also won the young rider classification at the same race. Van der Poel was a member of the Dutch World Championship squad, when he competed in the junior road race; he finished within the 56-rider main group, and as the best-placed Dutch rider, in ninth position. Picking up where he left off the previous winter, Van der Poel's 2012–13 cyclo-cross campaign was flawless; he contested thirty races, and won every single one of them. Having defended his European title in the United Kingdom, Van der Poel maintained his Dutch title in Hilvarenbeek on the same day that his brother David won the Under-23 Championships.

==== World champion in cyclo-cross and on the road ====
The month after winning his Dutch title, Van der Poel became the first cyclist to defend his junior world title, by winning the race in Louisville, Kentucky, ahead of teammate Martijn Budding. In the 2013 road season, Van der Poel contested several Nations' Cup Juniors events for the Dutch national team. At the Course de la Paix, Van der Poel won the opening stage in a six-rider select group; he held the race lead into the following day, where Mads Pedersen assumed the race lead for the remainder of the race in an individual time trial around Třebenice. Van der Poel finished third, behind Pedersen and Logan Owen. His next appearance came at the Grand Prix Général Patton, where he soloed – from 14 km (8.7 mi) remaining – to a six-second victory on the race's second and final stage in Wincrange, en route to finishing second place overall, five seconds adrift of race-winner Christoffer Lisson of Denmark. In the process, he also won the points and mountains sub-classifications.

Van der Poel booked stage victories at the Ain'Ternational–Rhône Alpes–Valromey Tour; riding for Enerthem-BKCP, he won a five-rider sprint on the opener, and defeated France's Élie Gesbert in a head-to-head finish on the final stage, to take the overall race victory by almost half a minute from Gesbert. Prior to his next Nations Cup appearance, Van der Poel won the Dutch National Junior Road Race Championships in Chaam. At the Trophée Centre Morbihan, Van der Poel won the race overall, having defended the race lead from the start, after winning a head-to-head sprint against Belarus' Aleksandr Riabushenko on the opening stage. In the lead up to the World Championships, Van der Poel dominated the Grand Prix Rüebliland event, as he won the opening three of the race's four stages. He won a three-rider sprint in Bettwil to win the opening stage, before a solo victory the following day in Leutwil, and a victory in a 9 km (5.6 mi) individual time trial in Hunzenschwil. Pedersen got the better of Van der Poel in a bunch sprint on the final stage, but Van der Poel had done enough to win the race overall by 46 seconds over Pedersen.

This form made Van der Poel one of the favourites for the World Championships, where he would lead the Dutch squad. In addition to competing in the road race, Van der Poel contested the junior time trial race for the Netherlands, along with Sam Oomen. Van der Poel finished 50th out of the 84 riders to complete the course, over two minutes down on the eventual world champion Igor Decraene of Belgium. In the road race, Van der Poel attacked on the final lap, and bridged up to the race leader Franck Bonnamour of France; he later distanced him on the final climb of Via Salviati – around 5 km (3.1 mi) from the finish – and soloed away to win the gold medal, ahead of Pedersen and Albania's Nikaj Iltjan.

=== Senior career ===
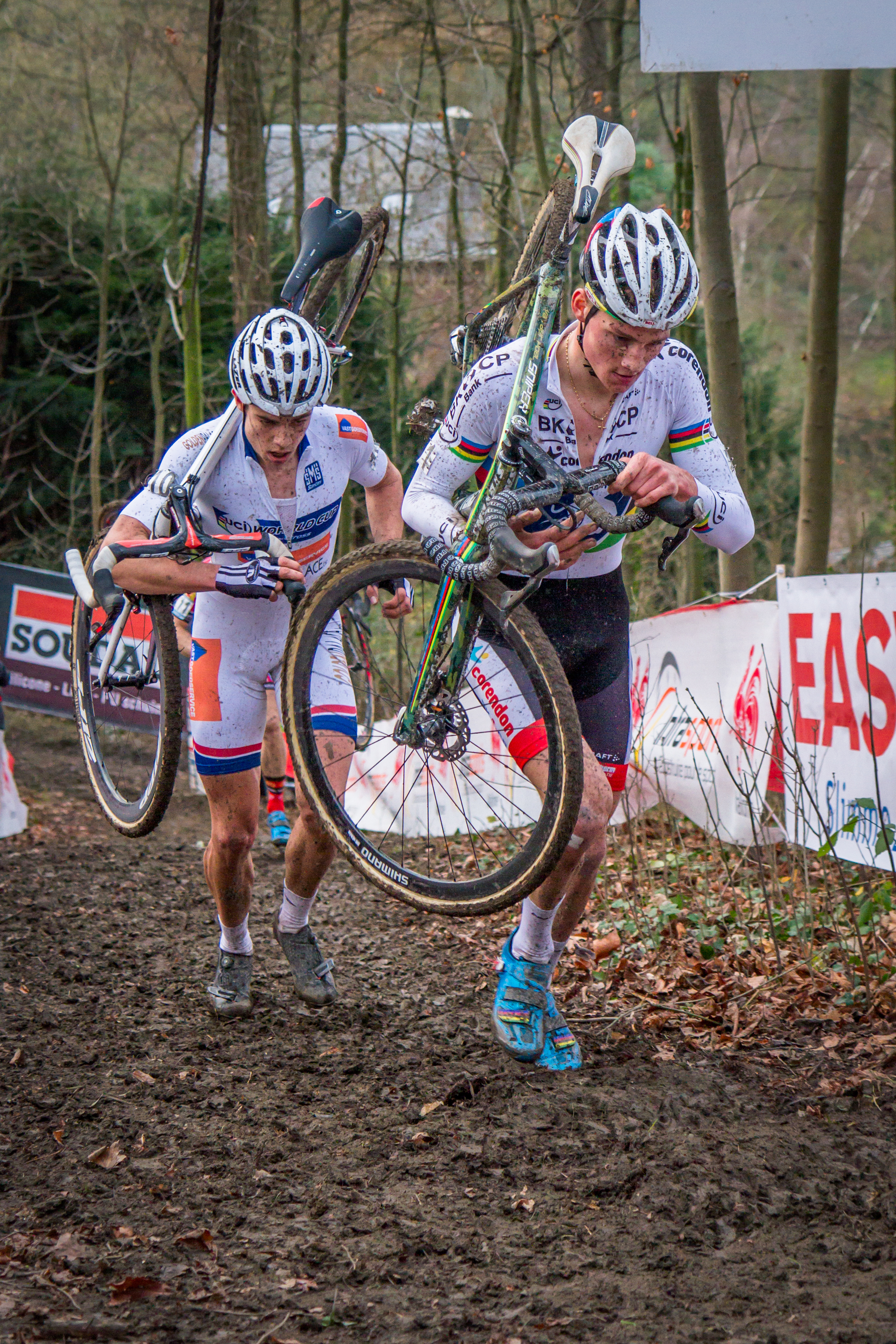
Van der Poel (right) in front of Wout Van Aert at the UCI Cyclocross World Cup, Namur, 2015

Van der Poel moved into the under-23 category ahead of the 2013–14 cyclo-cross season. In his first race in the class, Van der Poel won the GP Mario De Clercq – in the BPost Bank Trophy – at Ronse, defeating nearest rival Gianni Vermeersch by twelve seconds. After he finished third in his first World Cup race, Van der Poel won the second round of the season at Tábor in the Czech Republic, beating Vermeersch once again by three seconds. In the process, Van der Poel became the first rider since Niels Albert in 2004 to take an under-23 race victory as a first-year rider. He completed a clean sweep of victories in the major cyclo-cross competitions, by winning at Ruddervoorde in the Superprestige the following day, leading home his rivals by almost a minute. He won a silver medal at the UEC European Cyclo-cross Championships in Mladá Boleslav in the Czech Republic, finishing 23 seconds behind winner Michael Vanthourenhout.

Van der Poel turned professional with the BKCP–Powerplus team at the start of the 2014 season, joining brother David at the squad, having signed a four-year contract. Prior to doing so, Van der Poel made his elite debut in the Scheldecross Antwerpen, in December 2013; Van der Poel was competing alongside professionals as there was no under-23 race. He finished second in the race, five seconds behind his future teammate Niels Albert, having dropped Philipp Walsleben and Rob Peeters in the closing stages. He again finished second to Albert ten days later in the Grand Prix De Ster Sint-Niklaas, losing out in a two-man sprint finish. He ended 2013 with his fourth Superprestige victory of the season at Diegem.

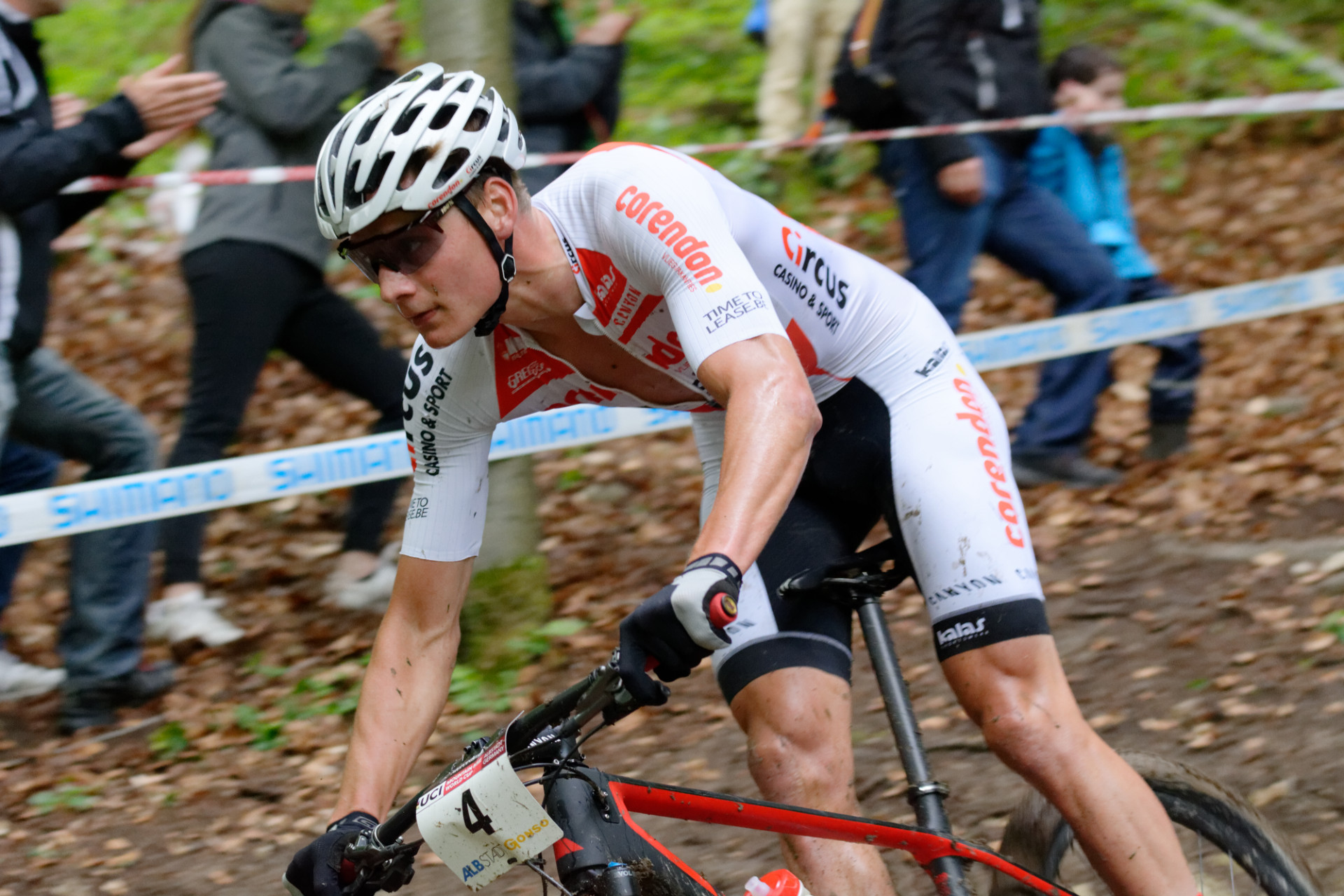
Van der Poel at the 2018 Cross-country World Cup in Albstadt

After finishing second to Wout van Aert in his opening race of 2014 at the Grand Prix Sven Nys, Van der Poel secured the overall under-23 World Cup title with his fourth win of the season, at the Memorial Romano Scotti in Rome. He achieved his first professional victory at the Boels Classic Internationale Cyclo-cross in Heerlen, beating closest rivals Thijs van Amerongen and Rob Peeters. In his first senior road race, Van der Poel finished seventh in the Omloop der Kempen, which had finished in a sprint to the line in Veldhoven. Just a few weeks later he secured his first professional victory on the road, winning the Ronde van Limburg.

He began to compete in the cross-country cycling discipline of the sport having set his sights on the Tokyo 2020 Olympic Games. In 2017 he placed 2nd in the World Cup at Albstadt behind world champion Nino Schurter. In 2018 he raced a full World Cup season finishing 2nd in the series overall and 3rd at the World Championships in Lenzerheide, as well as winning the Dutch National Championship.

At the 2018 European Cycling Championships in Glasgow, Van der Poel competed in the cross-country mountain bike and the road race, winning a silver medal in the latter.

==== 2019 – first classics victories ====
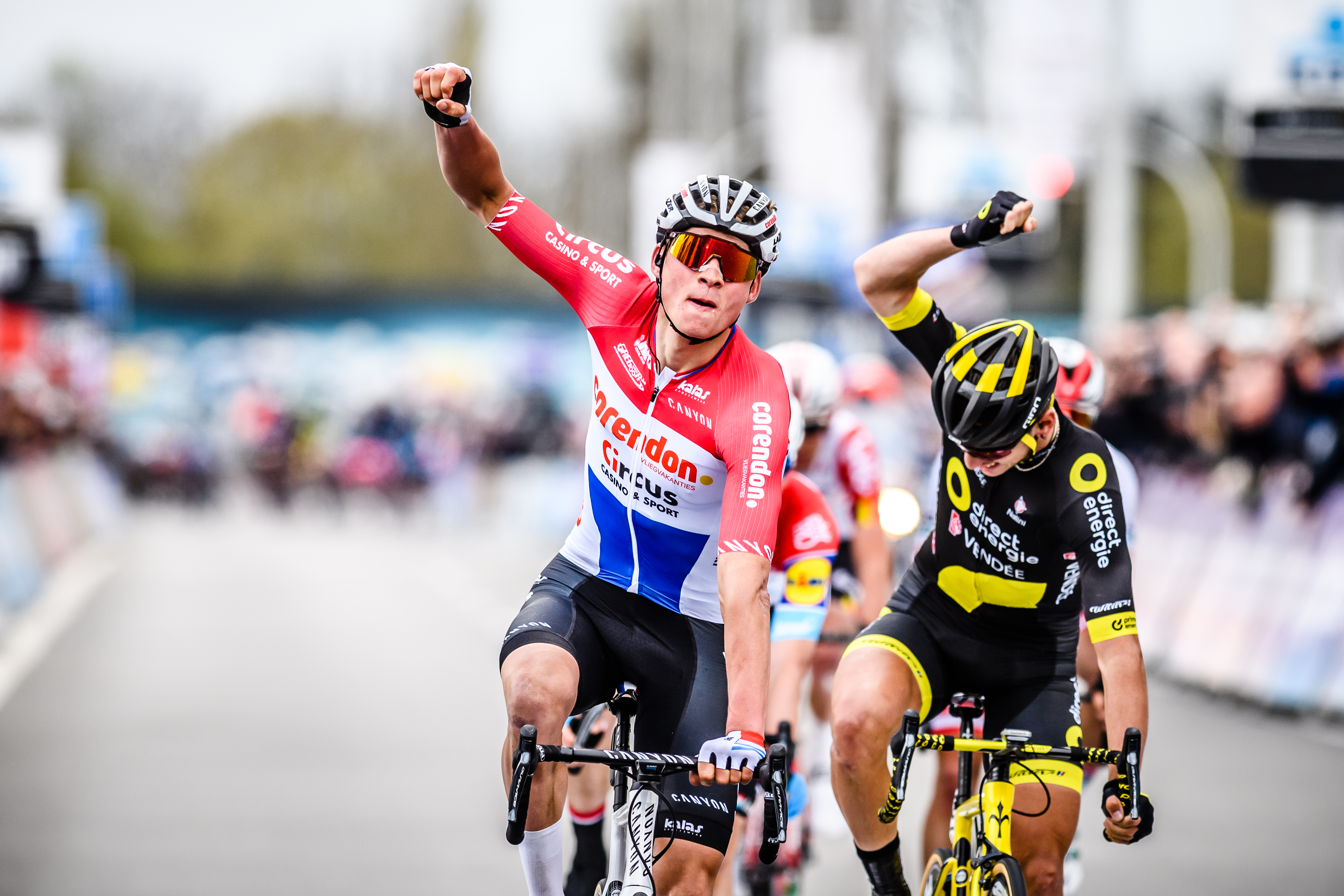
Van der Poel celebrating victory in the 2019 Dwars door Vlaanderen

Van der Poel won the 2019 Dwars door Vlaanderen.

In March 2019, van der Poel won the 2019 Grand Prix de Denain. He attacked from a leading group of three riders, including Alex Kirsch of Luxembourg and Trek–Segafredo and Estonian Mihkel Räim of Israel Cycling Academy, and rode over eight kilometers solo to the finish.

At the 2019 Amstel Gold Race, van der Poel was the first of the favourites to attack at 43 km to the finish together with Gorka Izagirre, but their attempt was brought back by the peloton soon after. After the final ascent of the Cauberg, Julian Alaphilippe and Jakob Fuglsang had a lead of 30 seconds over the two chasers and nearly a minute over the group behind. With 3 km to go their lead was up to 40 seconds over Michał Kwiatkowski. At that point, the two in front stopped collaborating with each other, attempting to conserve energy for their final sprint. However, they were then caught in the last kilometer, first by Kwiatkowski and then by the other chase group led by Van der Poel. In the ensuing sprint, Van der Poel proved to be the strongest

==== 2020 – first Tour of Flanders win ====
In October, van der Poel won the 2020 Tour of Flanders, by outsprinting Wout van Aert. The pair had broken away with Julian Alaphillipe before the latter crashed out in an incident involving a race motorcycle.

==== 2021 – Tour de France stage win and yellow jersey ====
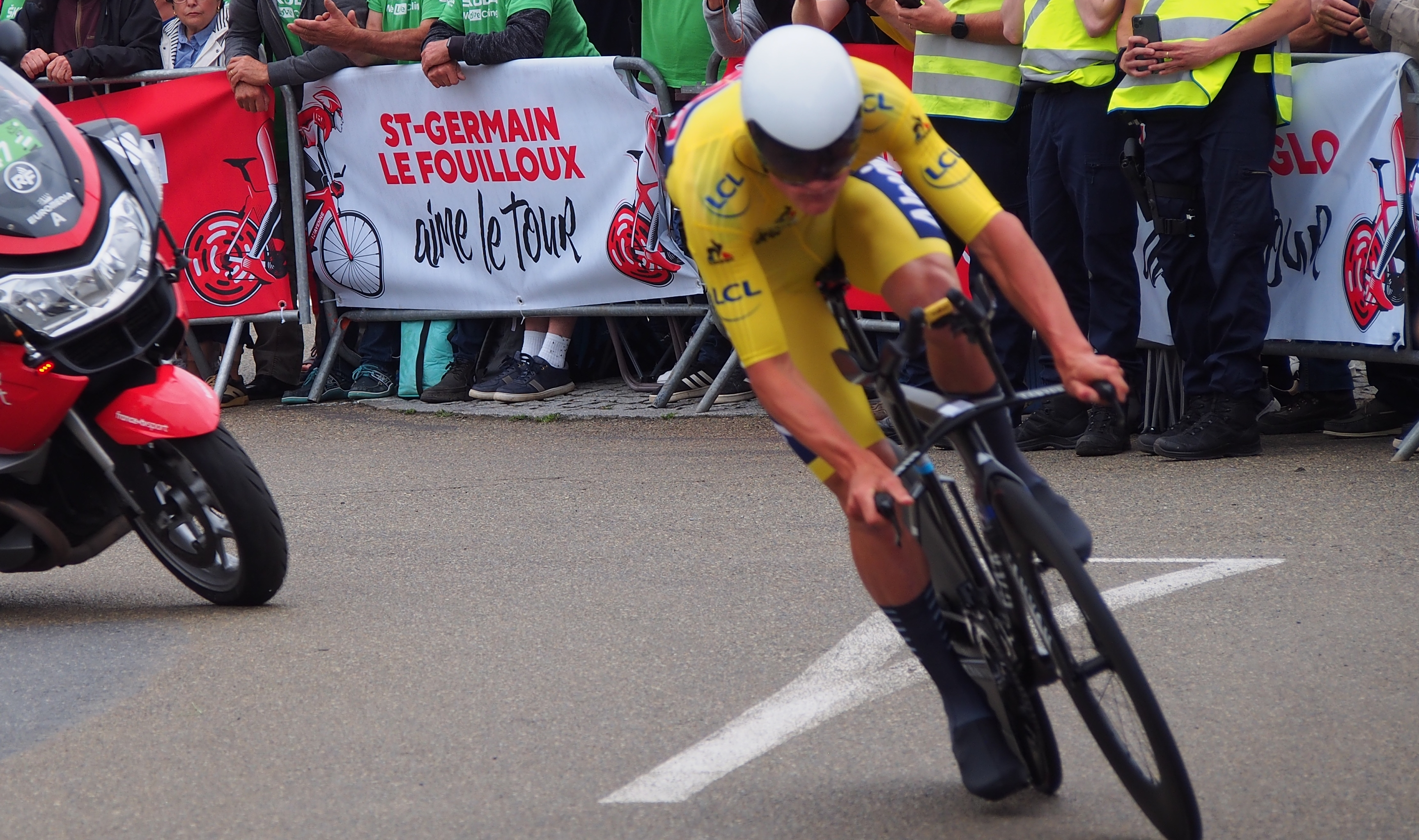
Van der Poel in the yellow jersey in the 2021 Tour de France

In 2021, Van der Poel competed in his first grand tour, the 2021 Tour de France. Here he succeeded in winning the second stage and acquired the yellow jersey, which he wore for six days. He also secured the King of the Mountain jersey on that stage, which he held for a single day.

Van der Poel participated in the Mountain Biking event at the 2020 Summer Olympics in Tokyo. The event had seven laps, but he crashed on a descent in the first lap, as he was apparently unaware that a ramp, present during practice, had been removed. He managed to continue racing, but eventually pulled out after the sixth lap, unable to make up lost time.

Due to persistent back problems, worsened by his Olympic crash, Van der Poel did not defend his title at the 2021 Tour of Britain. He won the 2021 edition of the Antwerp Port Epic, which he used as a trial run for the UCI World Championships.

He came eighth at the 2021 UCI Road World Championships and finished his road season in the 2021 Paris–Roubaix where he took the final podium place covered head to toe in mud. He put an initial hold on his cyclocross season due to his continued back pain, and eventually raced twice before pulling out altogether. At his first race, the Dendermonde World Cup, he finished second behind Wout van Aert. In his second and final race of the season, he crashed early on and pulled out after seven laps.

In September 2021, he renewed his contract with Alpecin–Fenix until 2025.

==== 2022 – second Tour of Flanders win ====
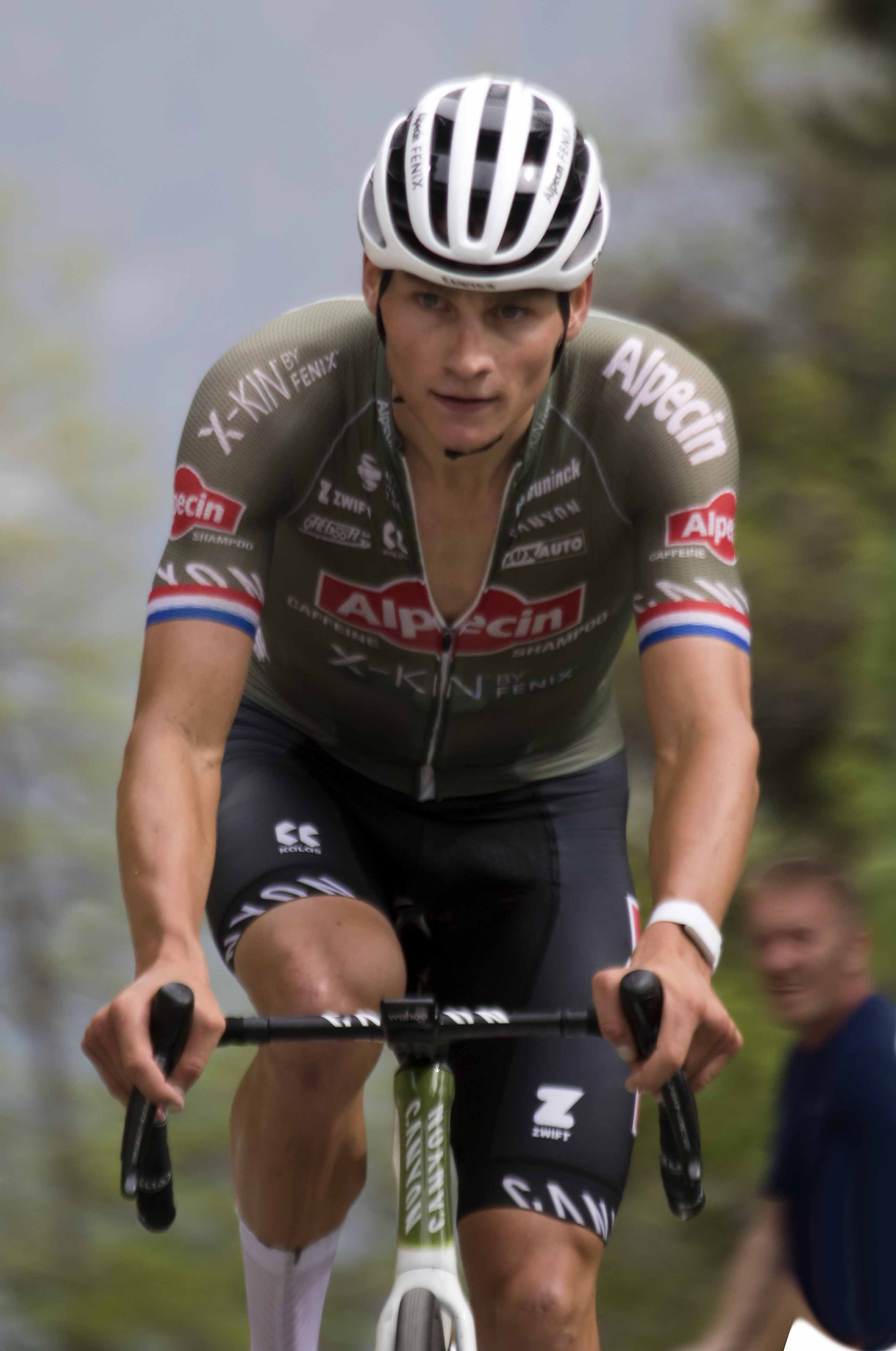
Van der Poel at the 2022 Giro d'Italia

After three months of rest due to his back pain, Van der Poel began his 2022 season at Milan–San Remo, where he finished third. He rode in the Settimana Internazionale di Coppi e Bartali, a five-day stage race, where he won the fourth stage.

He won the Dwars door Vlaanderen.

At the Ronde van Vlaanderen, Tadej Pogačar, making his debut at the race, attacked on the second ascent of Oude Kwaremont and the Koppenberg to pull ahead of the peloton with a select group of riders including van der Poel. Pogačar accelerated twice more on the final ascent of Oude Kwaremont and the Paterberg with only van der Poel able to go with him. The duo rode slowly inside the final kilometre as they prepared for the sprint but this action allowed Dylan van Baarle and Valentin Madouas to come back in the final few hundred metres before van der Poel took the win in the sprint finish.

After a fourth in Amstel Gold Race and a ninth in Paris–Roubaix, Van der Poel made his first appearance at the Giro d'Italia, the second Grand Tour participation of his career. He won the opening stage and wore the pink leader's jersey for three stages. He also won the overall Combativity Award.

In September, Van der Poel was convicted of common assault against two girls aged 13 and 14, after an incident in a hotel in Sydney the night before the Road World Championship; the conviction was overturned following appeal in December.

==== 2023 – Road World Champion ====
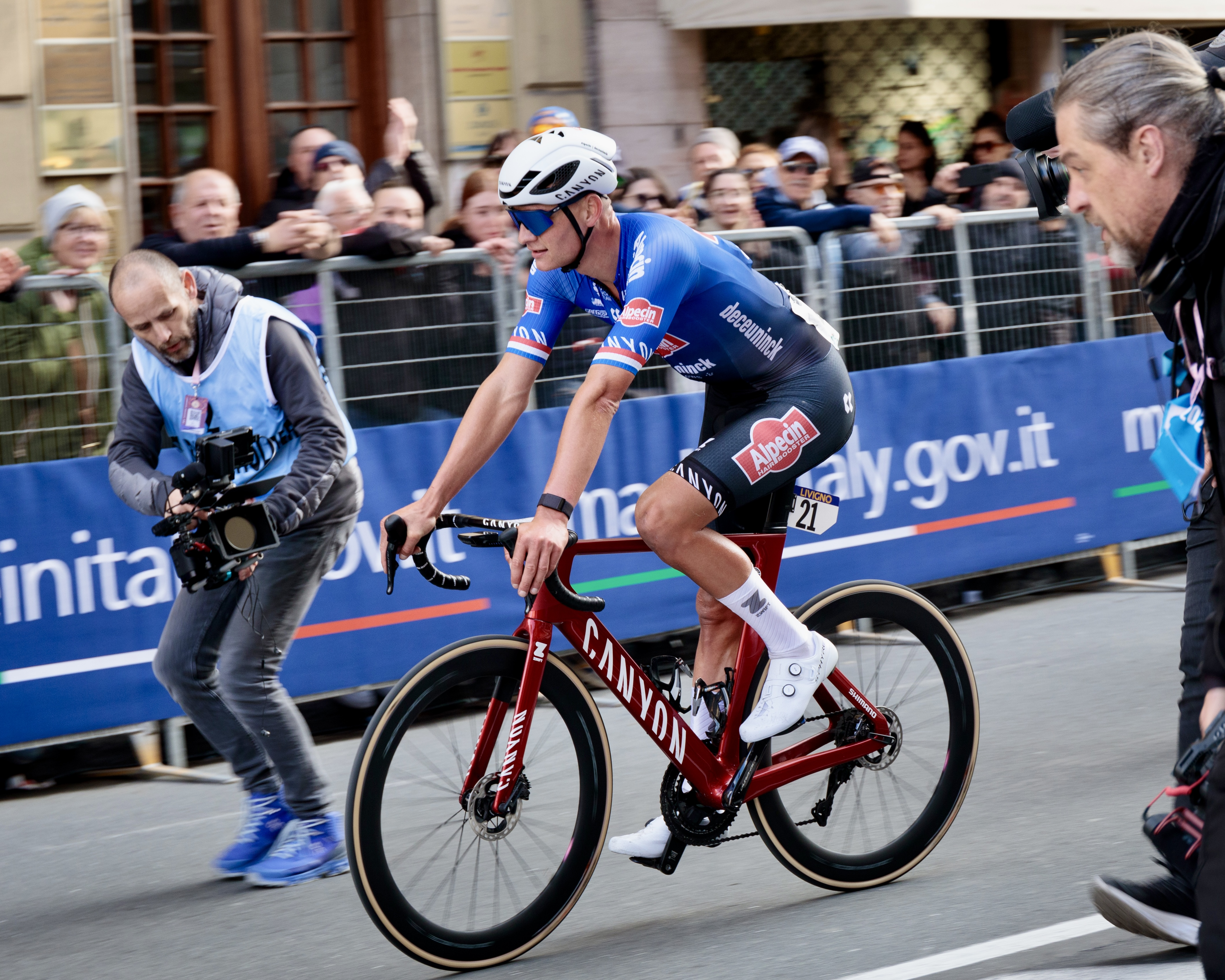
Van der Poel after winning the 2023 Milan–San Remo

Van der Poel began his 2023 season with a win at the X20 Trofee Herentals cyclocross race. He followed this up with two further wins and two silver medals before taking part in the UCI Cyclo-cross World Championships, which he won for a fifth time after a tight sprint against Wout van Aert.

At Milan–San Remo, Van der Poel attacked at the top of the Poggio di San Remo, leaving his main rivals Wout van Aert, Tadej Pogačar and Filippo Ganna behind and soloing into the finish in San Remo.

In April, Van der Poel won Paris-Roubaix, setting a new record of 46.841 km/h, an improvement of more than 1 km/h over the previous record, and finished second in the Tour of Flanders.

On 6 August 2023, van der Poel won the elite men's road race at the 2023 UCI Road World Championships, held in Glasgow as part of the inaugural UCI Cycling World Championships. Van der Poel attacked the leading group of riders including van Aert, Pogacar and Mads Pedersen in the closing laps and despite suffering a crash and damaging his shoe was able to extend his lead to take solo victory.

==== 2024 – Roubaix–Flanders double ====
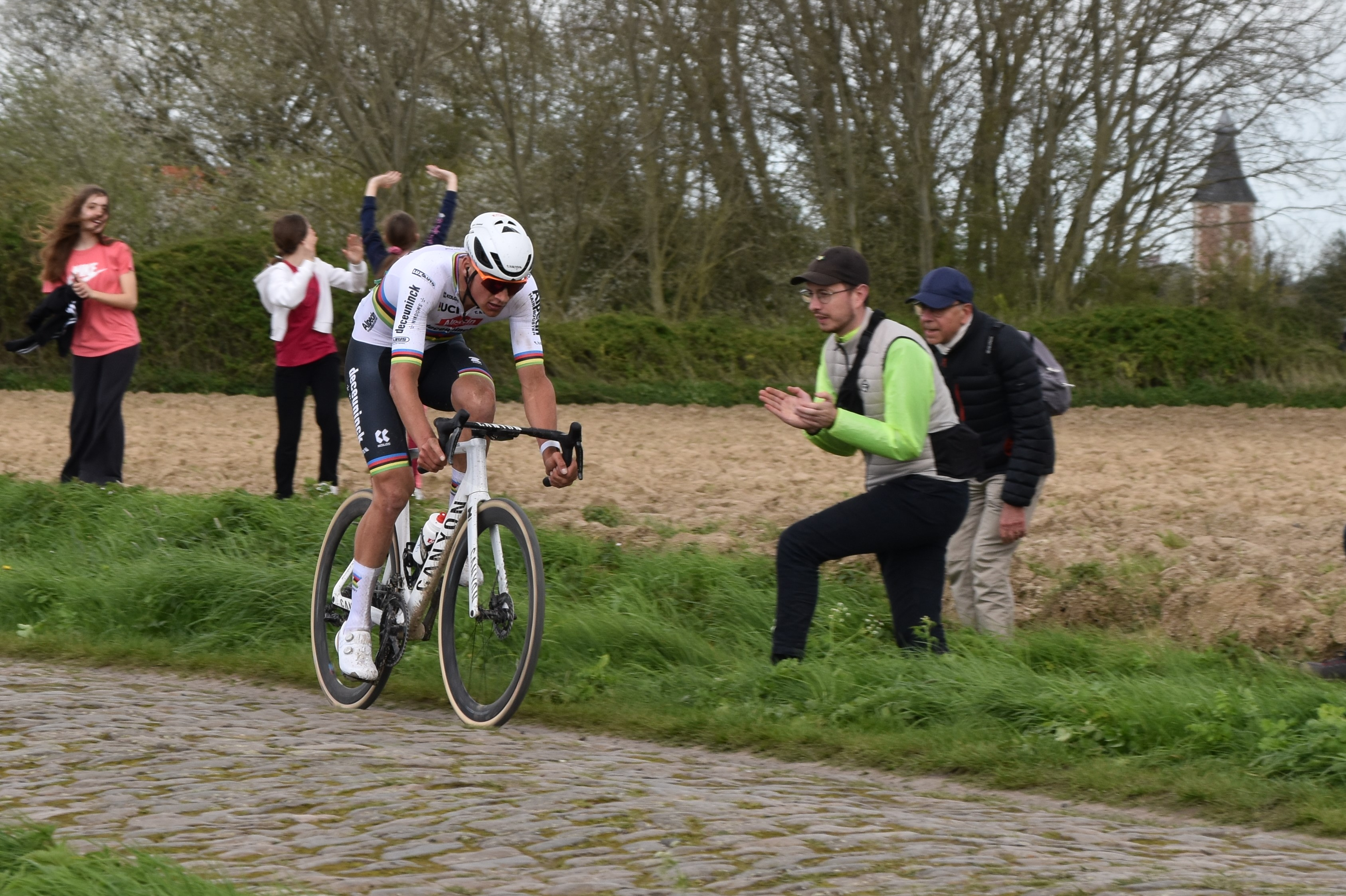
van der Poel riding to victory at the 2024 Paris–Roubaix

Van der Poel began his 2024 road season at Milan–San Remo, where Van der Poel rode for his teammate Jasper Philipsen, following Tadej Pogačar's attacks over the top of the Poggio and pacing the final lead in to San Remo, where Philipsen sprinted for the win.

Van der Poel had a strong cobbled classics season, winning the E3 Saxo Classic, finishing second at Gent–Wevelgem, and then winning the Tour of Flanders for a record-tying third time. The next week, Van der Poel won Paris-Roubaix for the second consecutive year.

Returning to defend his title, Van der Poel finished third, claiming the bronze medal at the 2024 UCI Road World Championships, after winning the sprint for third place in the group behind winner Pogačar and silver medalist Ben O'Connor.

In October, Van der Poel won the UCI Gravel World Championships, dropping breakaway companion Florian Vermeersch with 13 km to go and winning solo with over a minute gap. This marked Van der Poel's eighth world championship across three different disciplines.

==== 2025 – second Milan–San Remo win ====
During the winter cyclo-cross season, Van der Poel won every race he participated in, culminating in winning the world championships in Liévin. Van der Poel led for the majority of the race, finishing 45 seconds ahead of rival Wout van Aert. It was Van der Poel's seventh world championship, tying the record of Erik De Vlaeminck.

Van der Poel began his road season in March at the Ename Samyn Classic, which he won in a bunch sprint. Van der Poel won the 2025 Milan-San Remo, out-sprinting Filippo Ganna and Tadej Pogačar after following Pogačar's attack on the Cipressa with 25 km to go. It was van der Poel's second win at the race, and seventh monument of his career.

He secured his eighth monument victory with a win in Paris-Roubaix after riding solo away from the fallen Pogačar with 38 kilometers to go, eventually winning by over a minute. He became the third rider in the race's history to win three consecutive editions.

Van der Poel returned to cross-country mountain bike racing at the 2025 UCI Mountain Bike World Cup race in Nove Mesto, Czechia, but exited the race less than halfway through after crashing twice, with the second crash resulting in a fractured scaphoid bone. He vowed to continue preparation for the world championships despite the setback.

Despite the injury, Van der Poel returned in time for participation in the Critérium du Dauphiné. He finished inside the top 10 of all but two of the seven stages.

At the 2025 Tour de France, Van der Poel helped lead out Jasper Philipsen to the stage 1 victory before winning stage 2 in a sprint against Tadej Pogačar and Jonas Vingegaard, claiming his first win at the tour in four years and the yellow jersey in the process for the second time of his career.

==== 2026 ====
Van der Poel was selected for the 2026 Tour de France. He won both stage nine and the ultimate stage twenty-one on the Champs-Élysees, the latter after being in a breakaway with Tadej Pogačar in the yellow jersey. Van der Poel was almost caught in the last hundred metres, but fended off a small group of sprinters to win in the bike throw.

== Rivalries ==
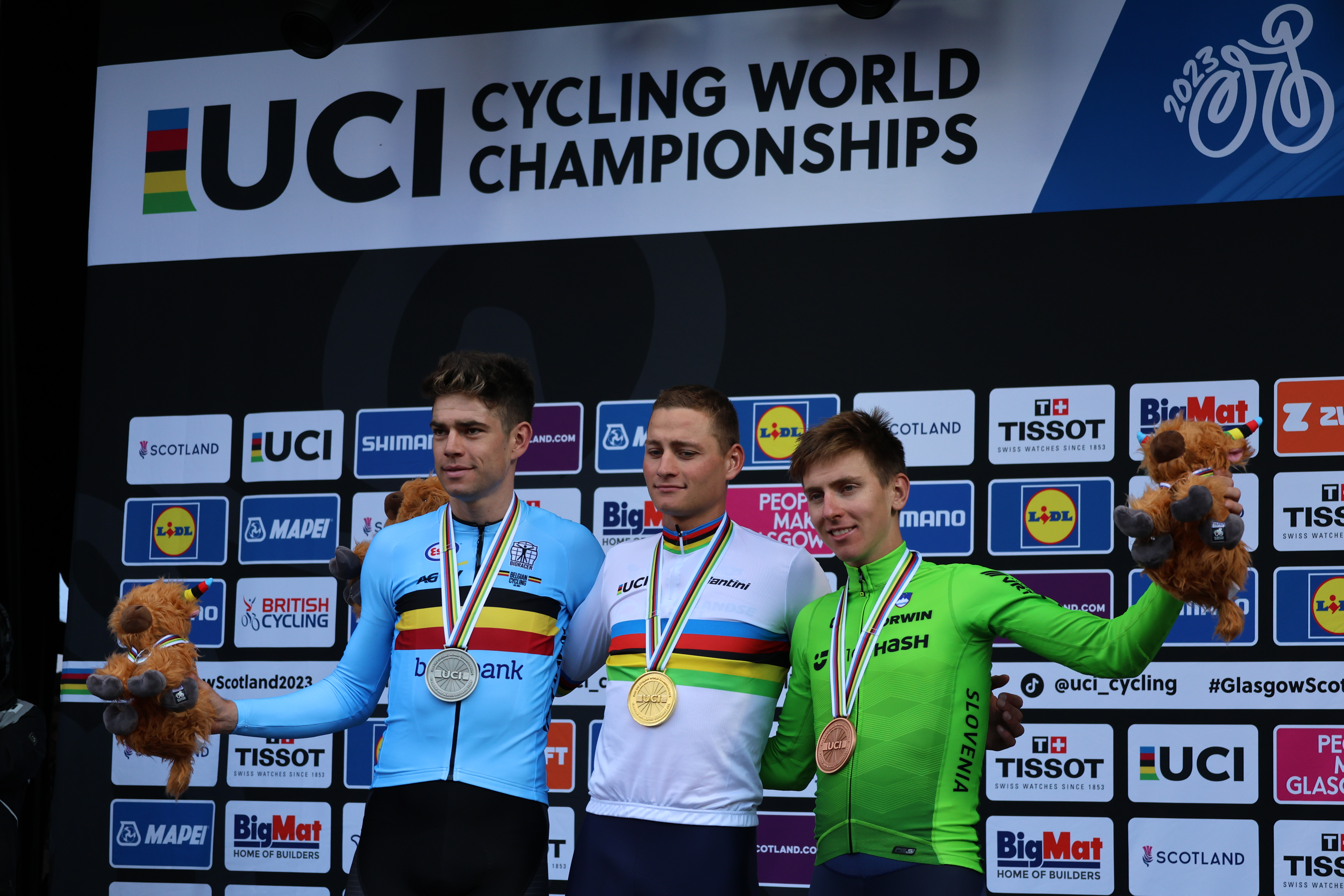
Van der Poel with Wout van Aert (left) and Tadej Pogačar (right) on the podium of the 2023 UCI Road World Championships – Men's road race

=== Wout van Aert ===
Van der Poel and Belgian Wout van Aert have competed against one another in cyclo-cross and road races for over a decade, and their rivalry is considered one of the greatest in cycling's history. In cyclo-cross, they have dominated the discipline, with Van Aert winning three world championships from 2016 to 2018, and Van der Poel winning eight between 2015 and 2026. On the road, Van der Poel has consistently outperformed Van Aert in Monuments and the world championships, but Van Aert is considered the more versatile rider, as he has consistently been better in bunch sprints, time trials, and long climbs.

=== Tadej Pogačar ===
Another rivalry of Van der Poel is with Slovenian cyclist Tadej Pogačar, with whom he competes in one-day classics. The two are regarded as the pre-eminent one-day riders of their generation, having combined for 21 Monument victories—eight for van der Poel and thirteen for Pogačar—placing them far ahead of other active cyclists. Their rivalry gained prominence in 2025, when media coverage intensified ahead of the spring classics. Van der Poel won Milan-San Remo and Paris–Roubaix that season, while Pogačar won the Tour of Flanders and Liège–Bastogne–Liège.

== Endorsements ==
Van der Poel is sponsored by luxury watch brand Richard Mille, and won his seventh cyclo-cross world championship while wearing a watch worth more than US$300,000.

In 2025, Van der Poel received criticism for his endorsement of Dutch private jet company Flying Group. In a response on social media, he wrote "I understand the environmental concerns, and I respect everyone's voice" but that flying private was critical to his sporting performance.
