= Quentin Jaurégui =

French bicycle racer

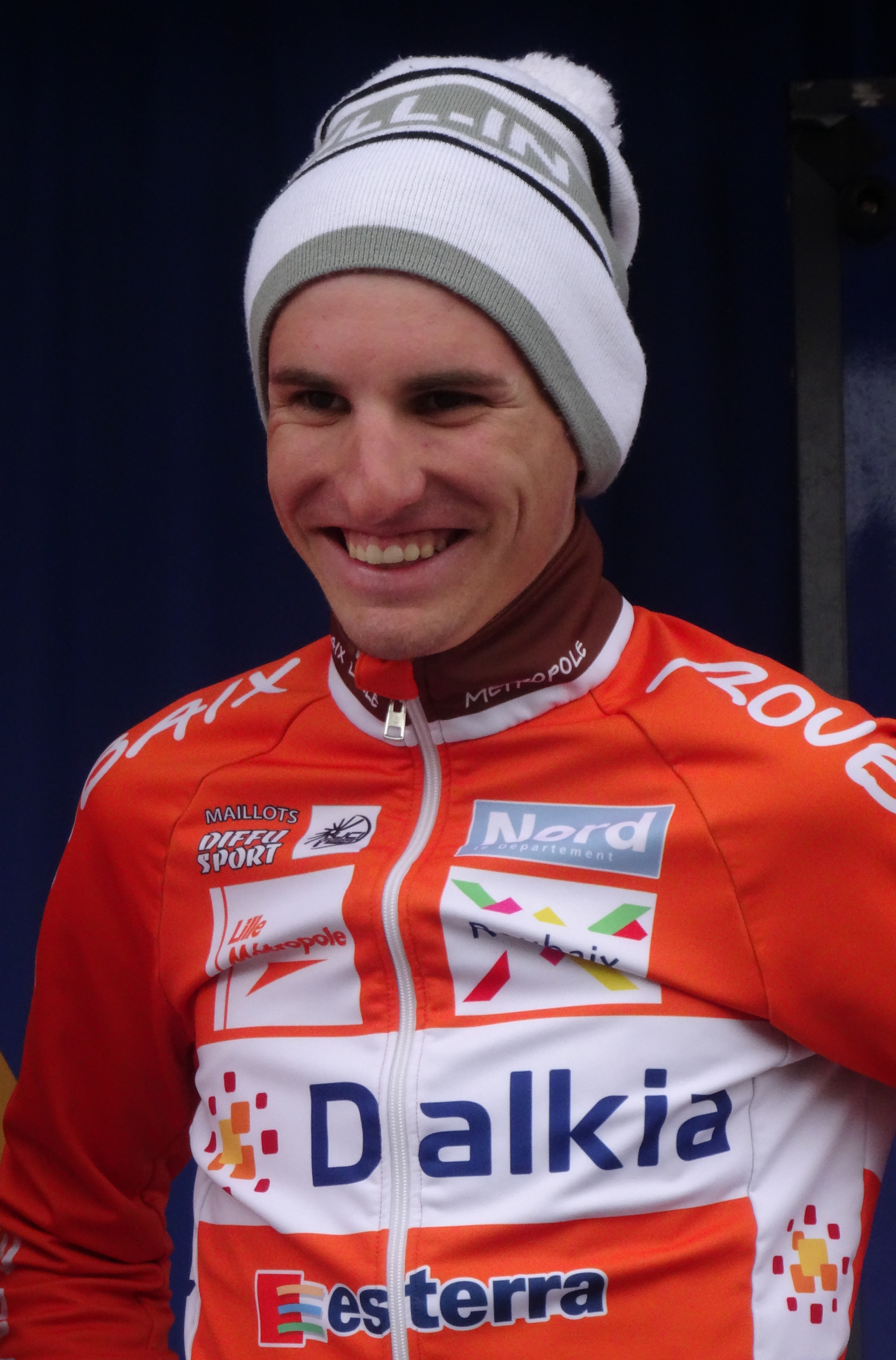
- Jaurégui in 2014.

Personal information
- Full name: Quentin Jaurégui
- Born: 22 April 1994 (age 32) Cambrai, France
- Height: 1.76 m (5 ft 9 in)
- Weight: 60 kg (132 lb; 9 st 6 lb)

Cycling career
- Sport: Cycling
- Current team: Dunkerque Grand Littoral
- Disciplines: Road; Cyclo-cross
- Role: Rider

Amateur teams
- 2009: CC Nogent-sur-Oise
- 2010: Vélo-Club La Pomme Marseille
- 2011–2013: Boxx–BKCP
- 2023–: Dunkerque Grand Littoral

Professional teams
- 2013: BKCP–Powerplus
- 2013: Argos–Shimano (stagiaire)
- 2014: Roubaix–Lille Métropole
- 2015–2020: AG2R La Mondiale
- 2021–2022: B&B Hotels p/b KTM
Medal record
Men's cyclo-cross
Representing France
World Championships
Bronze medal – third place	2012 Koksijde	Junior race
European Championships
Silver medal – second place	2011 Lucca	Junior race
Bronze medal – third place	2010 Frankfurt	Junior race

Quentin Jaurégui (born 22 April 1994) is a French cyclist, who currently rides for French amateur team Dunkerque Grand Littoral.

== Career ==
Jaurégui was born in Cambrai. In 2012, Jaurégui won a bronze medal in the junior race at the UCI Cyclo-cross World Championships in Koksijde, Belgium. On 3 May 2015, he won the one-day race Grand Prix de la Somme by beating Anthony Delaplace and Alo Jakin in a contest of three. He was named in the startlist for the 2016 Vuelta a España and the startlist for the 2017 Giro d'Italia.

== Major results ==
2010
3rd Junior race, UEC European Cyclo-cross Championships
2011
2nd Junior race, UEC European Cyclo-cross Championships
2nd Junior race, National Cyclo-cross Championships
2012
1st Junior race, National Cyclo-cross Championships
1st Overall Grand Prix Général Patton

1st Points classification
1st Stage 1

3rd Junior race, UCI Cyclo-cross World Championships
3rd Overall Tour du Valromey
5th Overall Liège–La Gleize

1st Stage 2a (TTT) & 3

6th Overall Rothaus Regio-Tour International
6th Overall Grand Prix Rüebliland
2014
1st Stage 1 Rhône-Alpes Isère Tour
3rd Polynormande
7th Tour du Finistère
2015
1st Grand Prix de la Somme
2016
1st Mountains classification Route du Sud
2017
3rd Tour du Doubs
2018
3rd Paris–Chauny
8th Overall Circuit de la Sarthe
10th Tour de Vendée
2019
2nd Boucles de l'Aulne
3rd Paris–Camembert
2022
1st Stage 2 Alpes Isère Tour
2023
5th Grand Prix de Brebières

=== Grand Tour general classification results timeline ===
Grand Tour	2016	2017	2018	2019	2020
Giro d'Italia	—	90	48	—	—
Tour de France	—	—	—	—	—
Vuelta a España	95	—	—	81	DNF

Legend
—	Did not compete
DNF	Did not finish
