= Kiko Galván =

Spanish cyclist

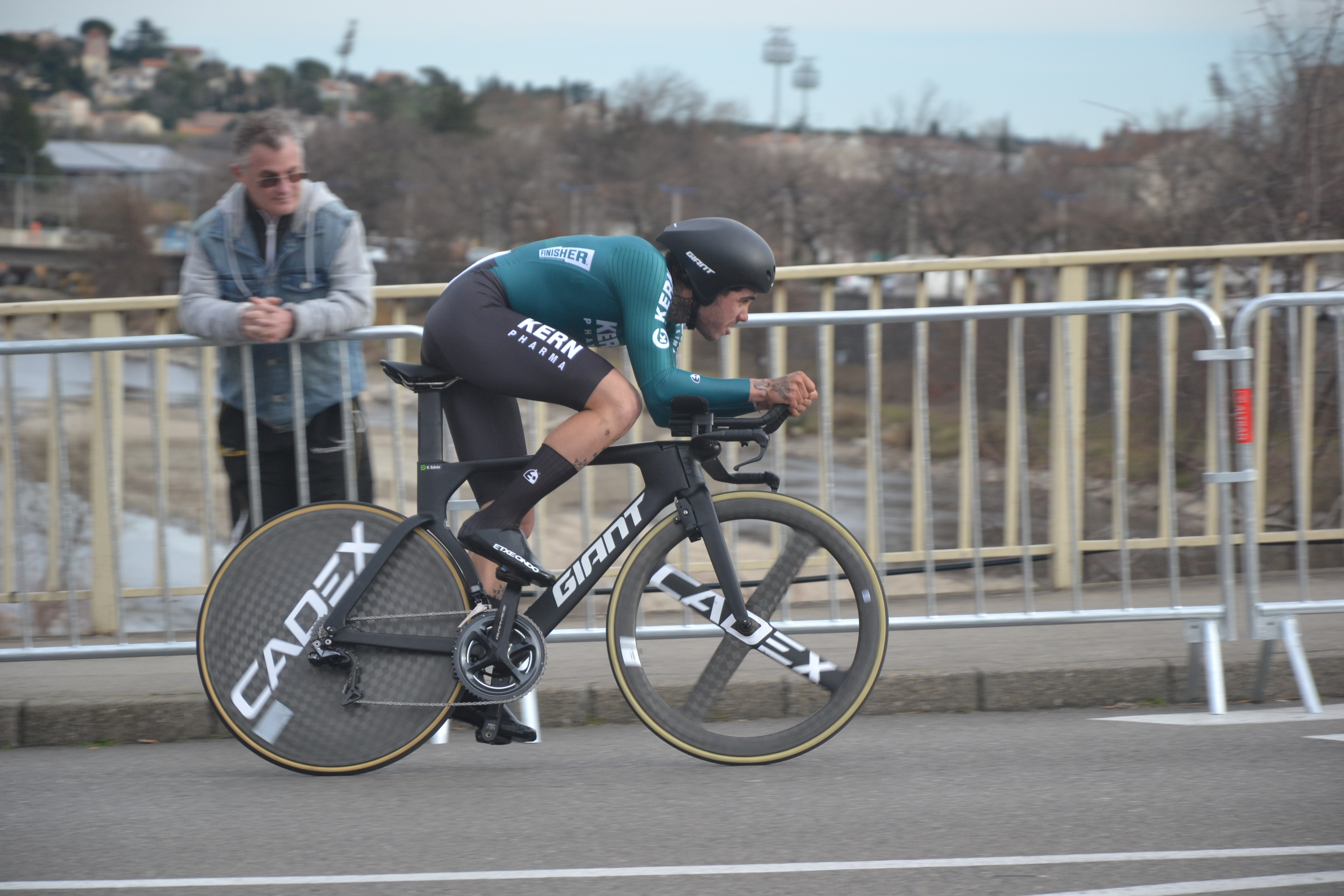
- Galván at the 2022 Étoile de Bessèges

Personal information
- Full name: Francisco Galván Fernández
- Nickname: Kiko
- Born: 1 December 1997 (age 28) Llissá de Munt, Spain
- Height: 1.76 m (5 ft 9 in)
- Weight: 71 kg (157 lb)

Cycling career
- Sport: Cycling
- Current team: Equipo Kern Pharma
- Discipline: Road
- Role: Rider

Amateur team
- 2016–2019: Lizarte

Professional team
- 2020–: Equipo Kern Pharma

Francisco "Kiko" Galván Fernández (born 1 December 1997) is a Spanish cyclist, who currently rides for UCI ProTeam Equipo Kern Pharma.

== Major results ==
2019
1st Overall Vuelta a Cantabria

1st Stage 1

2020
9th Overall Tour du Limousin
2021
4th Grand Prix La Marseillaise
4th Overall Volta ao Alentejo
2022
3rd Grand Prix La Marseillaise
9th Clàssica Comunitat Valenciana 1969
2024
7th Antwerp Port Epic
8th Cholet-Pays de la Loire
8th La Roue Tourangelle
10th Brussels Cycling Classic
2025
3rd Grand Prix La Marseillaise
6th La Roue Tourangelle
9th Trofeo Calvià
10th Trofeo Ses Salines

=== Grand Tour general classification results timeline ===
Grand Tour	2022
Giro d'Italia	—
Tour de France	—
Vuelta a España	105

Legend
—	Did not compete
DNF	Did not finish
