= Marc Sarreau =

French cyclist (born 1993)

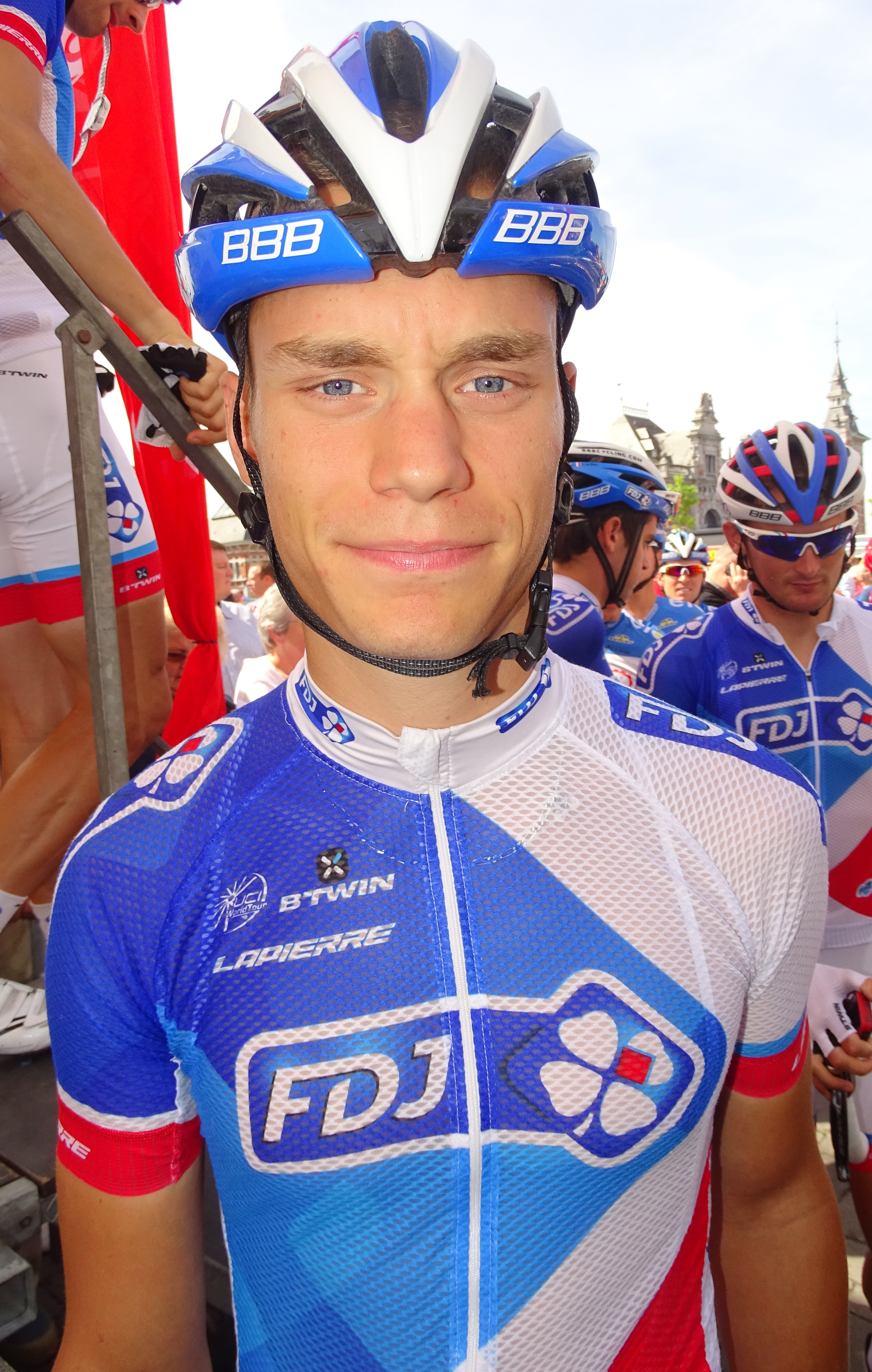
- Sarreau at the 2015 Grand Prix Pino Cerami

Personal information
- Full name: Marc Sarreau
- Born: 10 June 1993 (age 33) Vierzon, France
- Height: 1.82 m (6 ft 0 in)
- Weight: 72 kg (159 lb)

Cycling career
- Sport: Cycling
- Current team: Retired
- Discipline: Road
- Role: Rider

Amateur teams
- 2007: CC Vierzonnais
- 2008–2011: US Florentaise
- 2012–2013: Guidon Chalettois
- 2014: Armée de Terre

Professional teams
- 2014: FDJ.fr (stagiaire)
- 2015–2020: FDJ
- 2021–2023: AG2R Citroën Team
- 2024: Groupama–FDJ

Marc Sarreau (born 10 June 1993) is a French former cyclist, who competed as a professional from 2015 to 2024. He took 17 professional wins and competed in three Grand Tours in his career.

== Major results ==
2013
7th Grand Prix de la ville de Nogent-sur-Oise
2014
1st Overall Tour du Canton de Saint-Ciers

1st Stage 1

1st Boucles du Haut Var
1st Paris–Chauny
1st Stage 2 Tour Nivernais Morvan
1st Stage 2 Tour de Seine Maritime
3rd ZLM Tour
6th Overall Ronde de l'Oise
2015
1st Stage 3 Tour du Poitou-Charentes
4th Scheldeprijs
7th Grand Prix d'Isbergues
10th Grand Prix de Fourmies
2016
1st Stage 1 (TTT) La Méditerranéenne
4th Paris–Bourges
5th Cholet-Pays de Loire
9th Trofeo Felanitx-Ses Salines–Campos-Porreres
10th Trofeo Playa de Palma
2017
1st Stage 5 Tour du Poitou-Charentes
2nd Grand Prix de Fourmies
2nd Paris–Bourges
8th Scheldeprijs
9th Grand Prix d'Isbergues
2018
1st La Roue Tourangelle
Circuit de la Sarthe

1st Points classification
1st Stage 2

1st Stage 1 Four Days of Dunkirk
8th Grand Prix de Denain
9th Overall Étoile de Bessèges

1st Points classification
1st Stages 1 & 3

2019
1st Overall French Road Cycling Cup
1st Paris–Bourges
1st Tour de Vendée
1st Cholet-Pays de la Loire
1st Route Adélie
1st Points classification, Tour de Pologne
1st Stage 3 Étoile de Bessèges
2nd Grand Prix de Denain
2nd Classic Loire Atlantique
3rd La Roue Tourangelle
6th Tro-Bro Léon
2020
6th Race Torquay
2021
2nd Circuit de Wallonie
3rd La Roue Tourangelle
5th Cholet-Pays de la Loire
9th Scheldeprijs
9th Clásica de Almería
10th Overall Boucles de la Mayenne
2022
1st Cholet-Pays de la Loire
Tour Poitou-Charentes en Nouvelle-Aquitaine

1st Points classification
1st Stages 1, 2 & 3a

2nd Grand Prix d'Isbergues
5th Grand Prix de Denain
6th Paris–Chauny
8th Grand Prix de Fourmies
10th Paris–Bourges
2023
1st Stage 4 Tour Poitou-Charentes en Nouvelle-Aquitaine
6th Kampioenschap van Vlaanderen
6th Paris–Chauny
2024
7th Clàssica Comunitat Valenciana 1969

=== Grand Tour general classification results timeline ===
Grand Tour	2016	2017	2018	2019
Giro d'Italia	DNF	—	—	—
Tour de France	—	—	—	—
Vuelta a España	—	—	131	139

Legend
—	Did not compete
DNF	Did not finish
