= Amaury Capiot =

Belgian cyclist (born 1993)

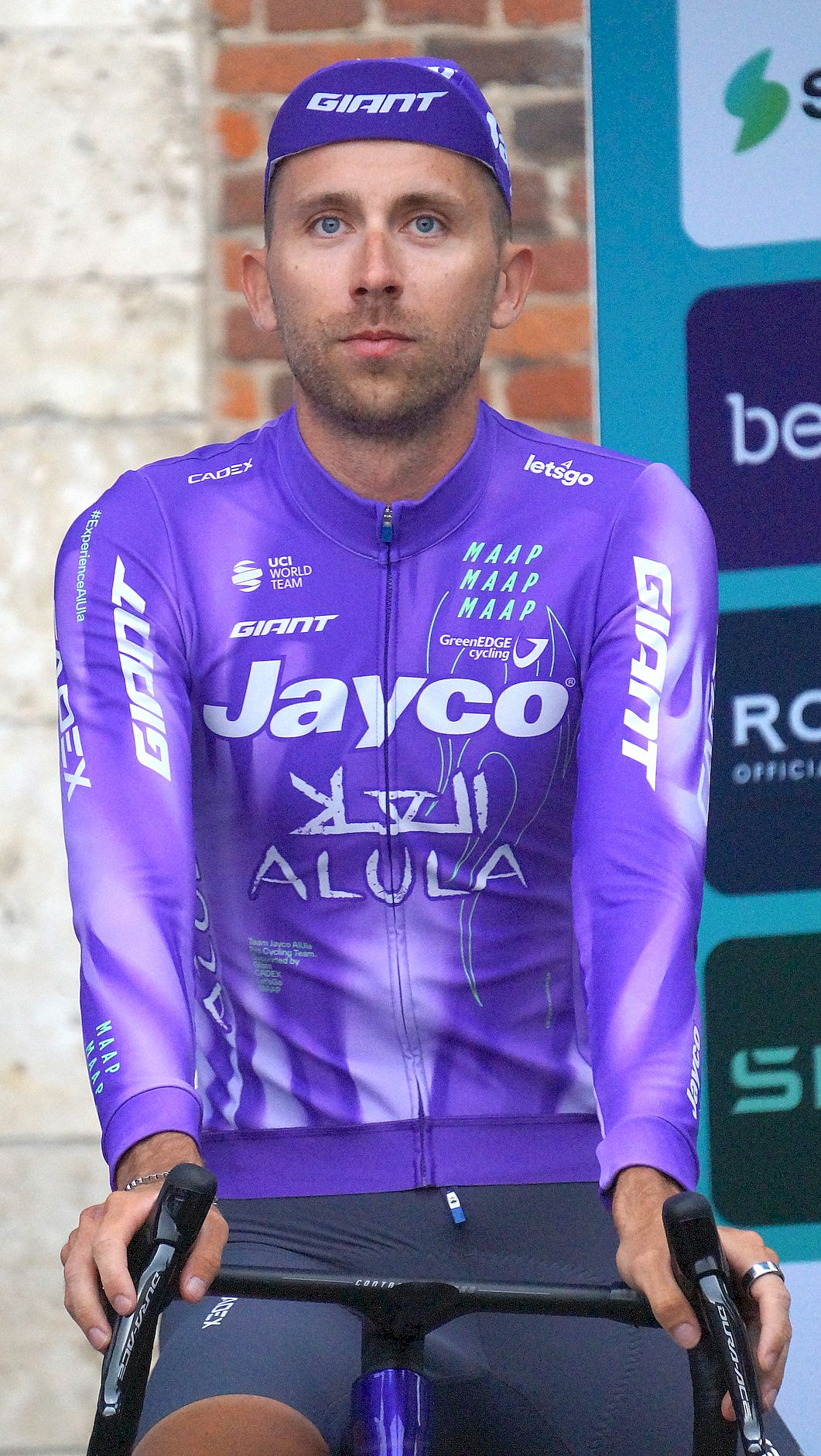
- Capiot in 2026

Personal information
- Full name: Amaury Capiot
- Born: 25 June 1993 (age 33) Lanaken, Flanders, Belgium
- Height: 1.87 m (6 ft 2 in)
- Weight: 69 kg (152 lb; 10.9 st)

Cycling career
- Sport: Cycling
- Current team: Team Jayco–AlUla
- Discipline: Road
- Role: Rider

Amateur teams
- 2011: Balen BC
- 2012–2013: Rock Werchter–S.O.S. Piet
- 2014: Lotto–Belisol U23

Professional teams
- 2015–2020: Topsport Vlaanderen–Baloise
- 2021–2025: Arkéa–Samsic
- 2026–: Team Jayco–AlUla

Amaury Capiot (born 25 June 1993) is a Belgian professional racing cyclist, who currently rides for UCI WorldTeam Team Jayco–AlUla. He is the son of former Belgian racing cyclist Johan Capiot.

== Major results ==
2011
1st Gent–Menen
1st Remouchamps–Ferrières–Remouchamps
1st Stage 1 Keizer der Juniores
8th Paris–Roubaix Juniors
2014
4th Antwerpse Havenpijl
6th Grand Prix Criquielion
7th Paris–Roubaix Espoirs
9th Overall Tour du Loir-et-Cher

1st Young rider classification

9th Overall Paris–Arras Tour
10th Kernen Omloop Echt-Susteren
2015
4th Velothon Berlin
6th Arnhem–Veenendaal Classic
7th Ronde van Limburg
7th De Kustpijl
9th Münsterland Giro
9th Omloop van het Houtland
2016
1st Combativity classification, Tour of Belgium
3rd Omloop Mandel-Leie-Schelde
4th Grand Prix de la ville de Pérenchies
4th Grote Prijs Marcel Kint
4th Tour de l'Eurométropole
5th Binche–Chimay–Binche
6th Ronde van Drenthe
6th Nationale Sluitingsprijs
7th Dorpenomloop Rucphen
7th Grand Prix de Fourmies
7th Kampioenschap van Vlaanderen
2017
5th Clásica de Almería
2018
2nd Nokere Koerse
6th Three Days of Bruges–De Panne
2019
3rd Paris–Bourges
5th Paris–Tours
6th Grote Prijs Jef Scherens
8th Brussels Cycling Classic
8th Grand Prix Pino Cerami
8th Grand Prix de Fourmies
9th Ronde van Limburg
2020
3rd Overall Tour de Wallonie
4th Trofeo Playa de Palma
6th Scheldeprijs
6th Clásica de Almería
7th Druivenkoers Overijse
7th Antwerp Port Epic
9th Brussels Cycling Classic
2021
3rd Clàssica Comunitat Valenciana 1969
6th Le Samyn
7th Paris–Camembert
9th Overall Tour de Wallonie
9th Gran Piemonte
9th Vuelta a Castilla y León
10th Paris–Tours
2022 (2 pro wins)
1st Grand Prix La Marseillaise
1st Stage 3 Boucles de la Mayenne
2nd Clàssica Comunitat Valenciana 1969
3rd Grand Prix de Fourmies
4th Grand Prix du Morbihan
6th Grand Prix d'Isbergues
7th Kuurne–Brussels–Kuurne
7th Grand Prix de Denain
9th Paris–Tours
10th Tour du Finistère
10th Kampioenschap van Vlaanderen
2024 (1)
1st Stage 4 Tour of Oman
3rd Muscat Classic
3rd Heistse Pijl
7th Rund um Köln
9th Le Samyn
10th Grand Prix de Denain
10th Clàssica Comunitat Valenciana 1969
2025
6th Rund um Köln
7th Overall Boucles de la Mayenne
9th Le Samyn
2026
6th Clàssica Comunitat Valenciana 1969

=== Grand Tour general classification results timeline ===
Grand Tour	2022
Giro d'Italia	—
Tour de France	84
Vuelta a España	—

Legend
—	Did not compete
DNF	Did not finish
