= 2011 Team Europcar season =

2011 Team Europcar season
Manager	Jean-René Bernaudeau
One-day victories	3
Stage race overall victories	3
Stage race stage victories	14
Previous season • Next season

The 2011 season for the Team Europcar cycling team began in January with La Tropicale Amissa Bongo and ended in October with Yukiya Arashiro's performance in the Japan Cup. It was the team's twelfth season as a professional cycling team, although its second as a UCI Professional Continental team. Unlike fellow former UCI ProTeams Cofidis, FDJ, and Geox–TMC, they did not seek the status for 2011, thus in order to compete in any UCI World Tour event, the team had to be invited in advance, by race organizers.

The season was one of the best in the team's history, with 20 victories and a Tour de France with multiple noteworthy performances. Team leader Thomas Voeckler wore the yellow jersey as race leader for ten days; the second such occurrence of his career, after also leading for ten days in 2004. Unlike that race, however, Voeckler poised himself as a serious overall contender and took fourth place overall; the best result by a French rider since 2000. While he spent most of the Tour riding in Voeckler's service, Pierre Rolland won one of the marquee stages, up Alpe d'Huez, eventually finishing 11th overall and winning the young rider classification.

Voeckler was one of the more prolific winners of the early season, tallying eight victories in 2011, the last of them obtained on May 8. The veteran Frenchman won five stages at four stage races, plus the overall crowns at the Tour du Haut Var and the Four Days of Dunkirk along with the single-day Cholet-Pays de Loire.

== 2011 roster ==
Ages as of January 1, 2011.

Rider	Date of birth
Yukiya Arashiro (JPN)	September 22, 1984 (aged 26)
Giovanni Bernaudeau (FRA)	August 25, 1983 (aged 27)
Franck Bouyer (FRA)	March 17, 1974 (aged 36)
Anthony Charteau (FRA)	June 4, 1979 (aged 31)
Sébastien Chavanel (FRA)	March 21, 1981 (aged 29)
Mathieu Claude (FRA)	March 17, 1983 (aged 27)
Jérôme Cousin (FRA)	June 5, 1989 (aged 21)
Damien Gaudin (FRA)	August 20, 1986 (aged 24)
Cyril Gautier (FRA)	September 26, 1987 (aged 23)
Yohann Gène (FRA)	June 25, 1981 (aged 29)
Saïd Haddou (FRA)	November 23, 1982 (aged 28)
Tony Hurel (FRA)	November 1, 1987 (aged 23)
Vincent Jérôme (FRA)	November 26, 1984 (aged 26)

Rider	Date of birth
Christophe Kern (FRA)	January 18, 1981 (aged 29)
Morgan Lamoisson (Note: Rider joined the team on August 1 as a stagiaire.) (FRA)	September 7, 1988 (aged 22)
Guillaume Le Floch (FRA)	February 16, 1985 (aged 25)
Yann Moritz (FRA)	September 22, 1988 (aged 22)
Bryan Naulleau (FRA)	March 17, 1988 (aged 22)
Alexandre Pichot (FRA)	January 6, 1983 (aged 27)
Perrig Quéméneur (FRA)	April 26, 1984 (aged 26)
Kévin Réza (FRA)	May 18, 1988 (aged 22)
Pierre Rolland (FRA)	October 10, 1986 (aged 24)
Sébastien Turgot (FRA)	April 11, 1984 (aged 26)
David Veilleux (CAN)	November 26, 1987 (aged 23)
Thomas Voeckler (FRA)	June 22, 1979 (aged 31)

Riders who joined the team for the 2011 season

Rider	2010 team
Sébastien Chavanel	FDJ
Jérôme Cousin	Vendée U
Tony Hurel	Vendée U
Christophe Kern	Cofidis
Kévin Reza	Vendée U
David Veilleux	Kelly Benefit Strategies

Riders who left the team during or after the 2010 season

Rider	2011 team
Freddy Bichot	Team Véranda Rideau Sarthe
William Bonnet	FDJ
Steve Chainel	FDJ
Pierrick Fédrigo	FDJ
Laurent Lefèvre	Retired
Matthieu Sprick	Skil–Shimano
Yuri Trofimov	Team Katusha
Johann Tschopp	BMC Racing Team
Nicolas Vogondy	Cofidis

== One-day races ==
=== Spring classics ===
The team had a solid showing at the traditional opener to the French cycling season, the Grand Prix d'Ouverture La Marseillaise. While FDJ's Jérémy Roy easily won the race with a solo breakaway, Gautier rode to sixth place by finishing near the front of the peloton two and a half minutes behind. At Kuurne–Brussels–Kuurne, one of the early-season Belgian races, Chavanel also turned in a sixth place, in a large field sprint. That same day, Gautier secured a podium finish at Les Boucles du Sud Ardèche, coming third in a selective 12-rider sprint at the front of the race. Chavanel rode to eighth place at Le Samyn, coming across the line 11 seconds back of the winner Dominic Klemme in a race decided by a late breakaway.

On the same weekend as the more prestigious Milan–San Remo, to which the team was not invited, they picked up two wins in single-day races. Veilleux won La Roue Tourangelle beating Saur–Sojasun's Anthony Delaplace in a two-up sprint five seconds ahead of the main field. Chavanel led the field across the line, giving Europcar two out of the three podium spots. That same day, team leader Voeckler won Cholet-Pays de Loire by foiling a field sprint. With 3 km (1.9 mi) left in the race, Voeckler went on the attack. He opened up a ten-second time gap very quickly and just held on to win, having no appreciable gap over the peloton at the finish. Since Cholet-Pays de Loire is a UCI Europe Tour race, Voeckler had to wear the all-white jersey of Europe Tour leader and not the French national champion's jersey, something which spectators expecting to see the tricolor jersey found absurd. While Voeckler was nonetheless happy to come away with a win, he stressed after the race that it was not Milan–San Remo, and that the victory should be viewed with the proper perspective.

In April, Jérôme won Tro-Bro Léon. He credited the win to advice from teammate Quemeneur, who hails from the area where the race was won, about the roads on which it was run. Also working in Jérôme's favor was a timely puncture from teammate Hurel. After Hurel got a wheel change, Jérôme had bridged up to him, so Hurel went to work for Jérôme. Jérôme and Will Routley then broke away from two FDJ riders for the final sprint, which Jérôme won with a time gap. Voeckler just missed out on the podium at the Tour du Finistère, finishing in second position of the peloton behind two late attackers for fourth place on the day. In late May, the team had a very strong showing at the Boucles de l'Aulne. While Vacansoleil–DCM's Martijn Keizer rode off with the victory, Team Europcar placed three riders in the top ten and four in the top twelve – Charteau on the podium in third, Gautier in fifth, Gène in seventh, and Veilleux in twelfth.

The team also sent squads to Omloop Het Nieuwsblad, Dwars door Vlaanderen, E3 Prijs Vlaanderen – Harelbeke, Gent–Wevelgem, the Route Adélie de Vitré, the Tour of Flanders, the Flèche d'Emeraude, the Scheldeprijs, Paris–Roubaix, Paris–Camembert, the Brabantse Pijl, the Grand Prix de Denain, and the Grand Prix de Plumelec-Morbihan, but finished no higher than 11th in any of these races.

=== Fall races ===
Cousin took ninth at the Polynormande, in fourth position from the peloton behind five breakaway riders. Haddou took fifth in a field sprint at the Châteauroux Classic, behind Ag2r–La Mondiale's Anthony Ravard. Voeckler took a podium finish at the GP Ouest-France. Lampre–ISD's Grega Bole broke away in the final kilometer to win the race, and Simon Gerrans and Voeckler tried to bridge up to him. Though everyone in the peloton had the same time at the finish, Bole, Gerrans, and Voeckler finished just ahead of the main field, in that order to round out the podium. Voeckler also turned in the team's best ride at the Tour de la Somme, finishing ninth in the field sprint. At the Tour de Vendée, which took place not far from the team's headquarters, they had two riders take top-ten placings, Charteau in sixth and Quemeneur in seventh.

The team also sent squads to the Tour du Doubs, the Grand Prix Cycliste de Québec, Paris–Brussels, the Grand Prix Cycliste de Montréal, the Grand Prix de Wallonie, the Grand Prix d'Isbergues, Binche–Tournai–Binche, Paris–Bourges, Paris–Tours, the Giro del Piemonte, the Giro di Lombardia, and the Japan Cup, but finished no higher than 11th in any of these races.

== Stage races ==
Just as they had been in 2010 under their former guise as Bbox Bouygues Telecom – when the team won two stages and the overall classification with Charteau – the team was very successful at La Tropicale Amissa Bongo in Africa. Gène took the team's first win of the year (and accordingly, first under their new name) in stage 2, the only stage that finished outside the race's primary host nation of Gabon, winning a field sprint in Ebolowa in Cameroon. In stage 4, the event's defending champion Charteau figured into a winning breakaway. Though he finished 24 seconds back on stage winner Daniel Teklehaymanot, he assumed the race leadership. He had a lead of four seconds over the man in second place and seven seconds over the man in third, but a good two minutes over the man in fourth, meaning it was virtually certain that he would at the very least finish on the podium. The next day, Gène added a second sprint win, as most of the field finished together and Charteau retained his advantage in the overall. While the final stage had the potential to shake up the overall standings, with three large groups finishing four seconds after one another, Charteau held on to win the race overall for the second straight year by finishing in the first of these groups. In February, at the Étoile de Bessèges, Haddou won the sprint finish to the race's titular stage finishing in Bessèges. Later in February, Voeckler won the first stage of the Tour Méditerranéen. He had instigated the morning breakaway with four others, and they stayed away by a margin of three seconds over the fast-charging peloton. Voeckler won the two-day Tour du Haut Var later in February. He finished one second down on Samuel Dumoulin in stage 1, but in the hillier second stage, he finished 29 seconds clear of any other riders, along with breakaway companion Julien Antomarchi. He allowed Antomarchi to take the stage win, knowing that he had the race overall won. The team entered another African race in February, the Tour of South Africa. After winning La Tropicale Amissa Bongo, Charteau was expected to be a top contender for victory, but he broke his collarbone after a stage 1 crash and had to leave the race. The squad did pick up a win, with Gène taking stage 3 from a breakaway sprint, but their best-placed overall finisher was Quemeneur over two minutes down on race champion Kristian House.

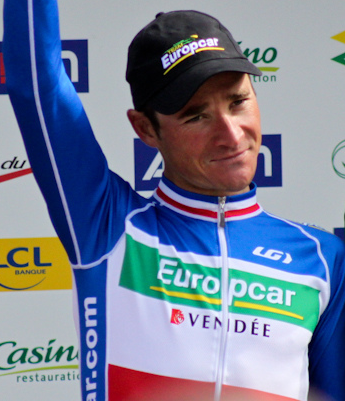
Team leader Thomas Voeckler took several wins early in the season, including stages at the Tour Méditerranéen, Paris–Nice, the Giro del Trentino, and the Four Days of Dunkirk.

Voeckler entered Paris–Nice optimistic for results, but with the realization that the stage 6 individual time trial would limit any chances he had on the overall crown. After finishing in the peloton for the first three stages, Voeckler figured into a winning breakaway in stage 4. He and recently ousted race leader Thomas De Gendt, with two others, broke away just 6 km (3.7 mi) into the stage and stayed away by a margin of 13 seconds over the peloton at the finish. Voeckler won the four-man sprint at the end and took the stage win, as De Gendt had spent all his energies drilling the group to the line in order to get the time gap he needed to retake the race leadership. It was Voeckler's first career Paris–Nice stage win, after having competed in the race since 2003. Voeckler lost two minutes in the mountains the next day and any chance at the overall, but he rebounded to win stage 8 from another breakaway. Again joining the morning escape, Voeckler was one of relatively few riders who chose to complete the race by riding a slippery descent of the Col d'Eze, and stayed out front by 23 seconds over Lampre–ISD's Diego Ulissi and one minute, 22 seconds over the peloton. He finished the race in 21st place overall. He added a sixth win on the season at the Giro del Trentino. Breaking away with Michele Scarponi on the climb to Ledro Bezzecca which closed out stage two, Voeckler defeated the Italian in the sprint 25 seconds ahead of the peloton. Upon seeing Scarponi make the juncture to him, he had been careful not to expend too much effort and leave himself fresh for the eventual sprint. Voeckler added further success at the Four Days of Dunkirk. While German sprinter Marcel Kittel won four of the race's five stages, Voeckler took the one that mattered as far as the overall classification was concerned. He put in a winning attack 20 km (12 mi) from the end of the hilly fourth stage, as the chase group he had been in caught the day's morning breakaway. He finished safely in the peloton in the final stage the next day, comfortably maintaining his minute-plus lead to win the race overall.

The team was successful in stage-hunting at events later in the season. Chavanel took his first win since rejoining the team, and first in three years, at the Circuit de Lorraine, winning a nearly full field sprint. Kern took a strong win at the Critérium du Dauphiné, finishing alone 9 seconds clear of the main field full of some of the best climbers in the world, atop the short, steep climb at Les Gets. The team had been very active in the finale, with Rolland and Voeckler launching attacks in the run into the finish before Kern got clear. The team's performances on the race's last day got them the victory in the race's teams classification as well. Later in June, Turgot won the prologue time trial at the Boucles de la Mayenne, besting Endura Racing's Alexander Wetterhall by less than a second. The squad won the team award at this race as well. Charteau showed his climbing prowess and cunning in stage 2 at the Route du Sud, outpacing Movistar Team's Vasil Kiryienka to win alone on a Pyrenean hilltop in Cauterets. The team did not win any stage at the Tour du Poitou-Charentes, but they did win two jersey classifications, with Pichot taking the mountains classification and Gaudin the sprints.

The team also sent squads to the Tour de Langkawi, the Driedaagse van West-Vlaanderen, the Circuit de la Sarthe, the Tour de Romandie, the Rhône-Alpes Isère Tour, Bayern-Rundfahrt, the Tour de Luxembourg, Paris–Corrèze, the Danmark Rundt, the Tour du Limousin, and the Tour of Britain, but did not achieve a stage win, classification win, or podium finish in any of them.

== Grand Tours ==
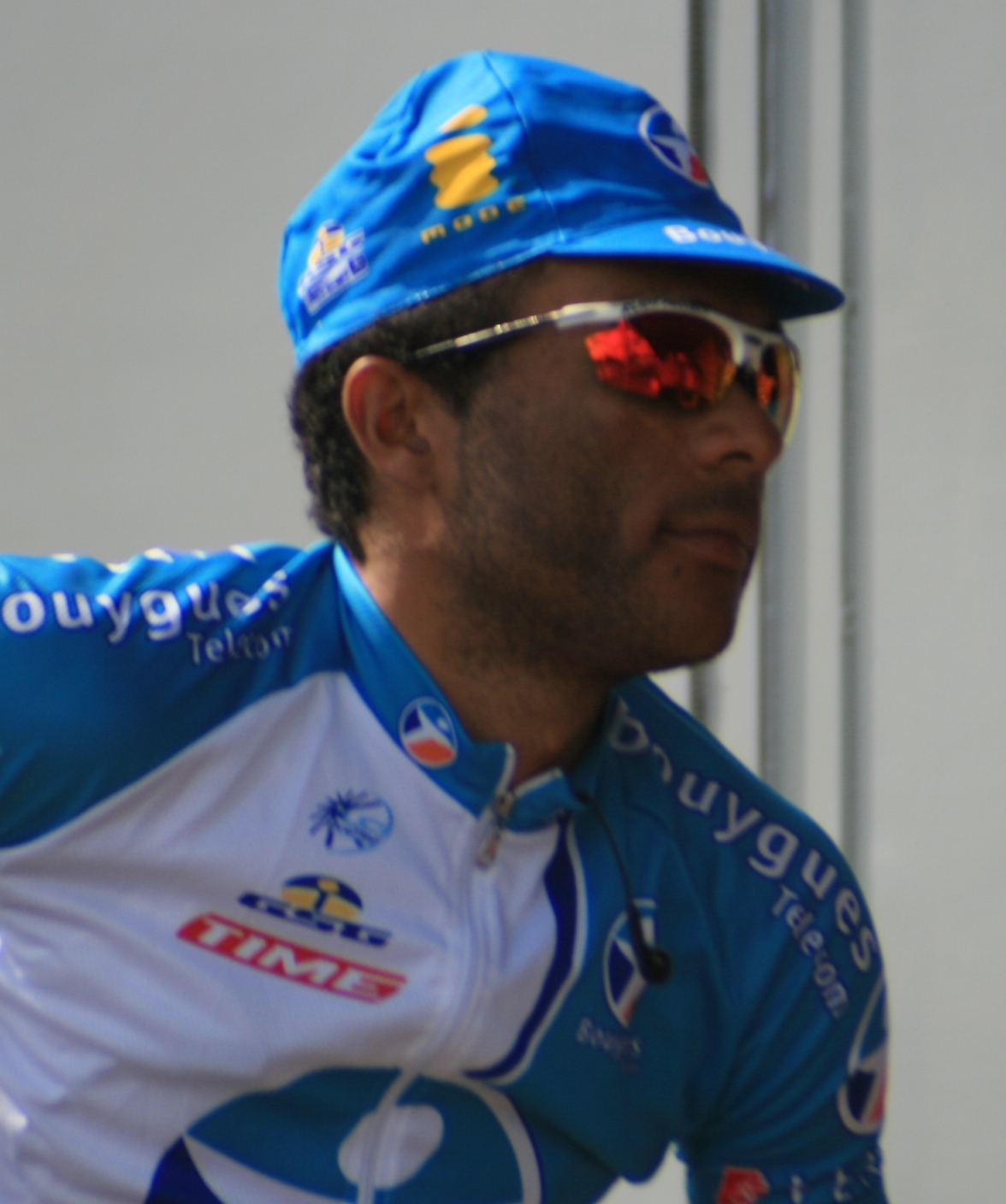
Yohann Gène, pictured here in the team's 2008 jersey under their guise as Bouygues Télécom, was the first black rider in the Tour's 98-year history.

As a Professional Continental team, Europcar needed to be selected by the organizers of any of the Grand Tours in order to participate. They were selected to ride the Tour de France, but not the Giro d'Italia, nor the Vuelta a España.

=== Tour de France ===
The Amaury Sport Organisation announced the wildcard entries to the Tour de France in January, much earlier than in past years. Team Europcar had among their number French national champion Voeckler, though he lost that title shortly before the Tour, a de facto national hero after he wore the yellow jersey for ten days in the 2004 Tour de France. Confident of their inclusion, they were indeed among the four teams added to the 18 UCI ProTeams obligated to attend. Voeckler was named as the squad leader, with Charteau and Kern his top support riders. Gène was also named to the squad, the first black rider in the Tour's history. The team started quietly, with no rider finishing near the front of the race on stage 1 at the Mont des Alouettes and 13th of 22 teams in the stage 2 team time trial. The team did not really figure into the sprint finishes that happened early in the Tour, having left their best sprinter Chavanel off the squad for the Tour. Turgot's eighth place in stage 7 was their highest such finish.

Stage 9 was the Tour's toughest stage to that point, with seven climbs during the 208 km (129.2 mi) parcours. Voeckler, who entered the day in 19th place a minute and 29 seconds down in the overall classification, made a high-powered breakaway with Luis León Sánchez, Sandy Casar, Juan Antonio Flecha (all of them stage winners in one or more previous Tours) and Johnny Hoogerland. Some 36 km (22 mi) from the finish line, a car from France Télévisions sideswiped Flecha and Hoogerland, the two front riders at the time, sending both off their bicycles and Hoogerland crashing into a barbed-wire fence. After a few uncertain minutes while he appeared to want to wait for Flecha and Hoogerland to rejoin them, Voeckler then drove the breakaway hard. With prior race leader Thor Hushovd well back, the yellow jersey was bound to change hands, and Voeckler's time gap over the main field at the time of Flecha and Hoogerland's crash made him very likely to be the rider to take it. Voeckler's efforts left him unable to sprint at the end of the stage, and Sánchez won, but his near four-minute time gap over the peloton gave him the yellow jersey by a minute and 49 seconds over Sánchez and two minutes and 26 seconds against the best-placed overall favorite, Cadel Evans in third place.

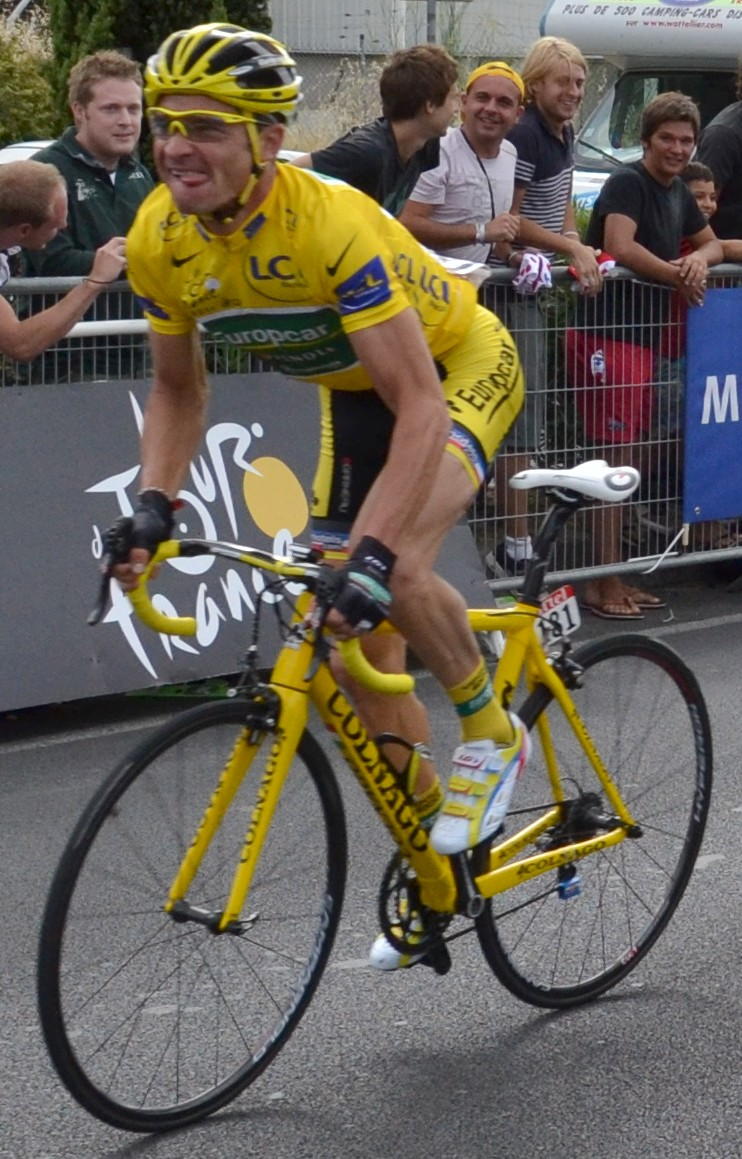
Thomas Voeckler wore the yellow jersey for ten days; the second time he had done so in his career, after 2004.

The overall standings did not change until stage 12, on Bastille Day, which ended with the hors catégorie climb to Luz Ardiden. Voeckler finished ninth on the day, ceding 20 seconds to most of the race's top overall riders, but still had sufficient time in hand to remain race leader by nearly two minutes. Rolland finished at his side for tenth on the day. Voeckler had said the night before that he expected to lose the jersey on this stage. After the peloton mostly stayed together in stage 13, popular expectation for stage 14, including two first-category climbs on course and another hors catégorie climb at the finish (Plateau de Beille), again was for Voeckler to lose the jersey. But he not only retained the jersey, he also finished with the main group of overall favorites, losing time to only three riders and actually putting time into other riders such as Damiano Cunego and Tom Danielson. Voeckler himself again expressed his surprise at his successes, saying "I was very surprised to be with the best riders up the Plateau de Beille climb. I don't know how far I can go." Stage 16 ended with a lengthy descent, from the second-category Col de Manse. Voeckler lost time to nearly all the race's top riders, and expressed after the stage his certainty that he could not win the Tour, but he remained race leader.

Stage 18 was undoubtedly the most difficult in the Tour, incorporating three hors catégorie climbs, including the Col du Galibier at the finish; as such, race organisers defined the stage as the race's queen stage. When Andy Schleck, who began the day two minutes and 36 seconds behind Voeckler, surged away from the race's top riders 60 km (37 mi) from the finish and quickly made it to the morning breakaway, it seemed all but certain that he would become the new race leader. While Schleck easily won the stage, Voeckler followed Evans as the Australian made a strenuous pull at the end of the stage to limit his time losses. At the very end, Voeckler lost Evans' wheel and fell to fifth on the day, two minutes and 21 seconds behind Schleck. Visibly so spent that he could not sit upright on his bicycle after crossing the finish line, Voeckler had retained the yellow jersey by a margin of 15 seconds. He said afterwards that while he had expected to lose the jersey earlier in the Tour, on this day all the team's efforts were put into retaining it. Post-race analyses called Voeckler a "survivor" and "astonishing."

With Voeckler having visibly given it everything he had in stage 18, and another hors catégorie finish looming (at Alpe d'Huez) in stage 19, he was no longer the favourite to keep the yellow jersey to Paris, as Evans and the Schleck brothers held an advantage over him in the high mountain stages. Though stage 19 was also the Tour's shortest, Voeckler was indeed dropped between the Col du Galibier (visited again in stage 19) and Alpe d'Huez, finally ceding the jersey to Schleck. However, the day was still a very good one for the team. On the ascent of the Galibier, Voeckler told Rolland not to work for him any further and to ride his own race, and Rolland rode at or near the front of the race the rest of the day. Together with Spaniards Alberto Contador and Samuel Sánchez as the leading group on Alpe d'Huez, Rolland rode away from them with 2.5 km (1.6 mi) to race and took the day's honors, the first and only stage win for a French rider in this Tour. He also claimed the best young rider white jersey by finishing two minutes the better of Cofidis' Rein Taaramäe, who had begun the day in the lead in that classification. Voeckler finished 20th on the stage, losing three minutes to most of the other top riders, but this dropped him only to fourth place overall.

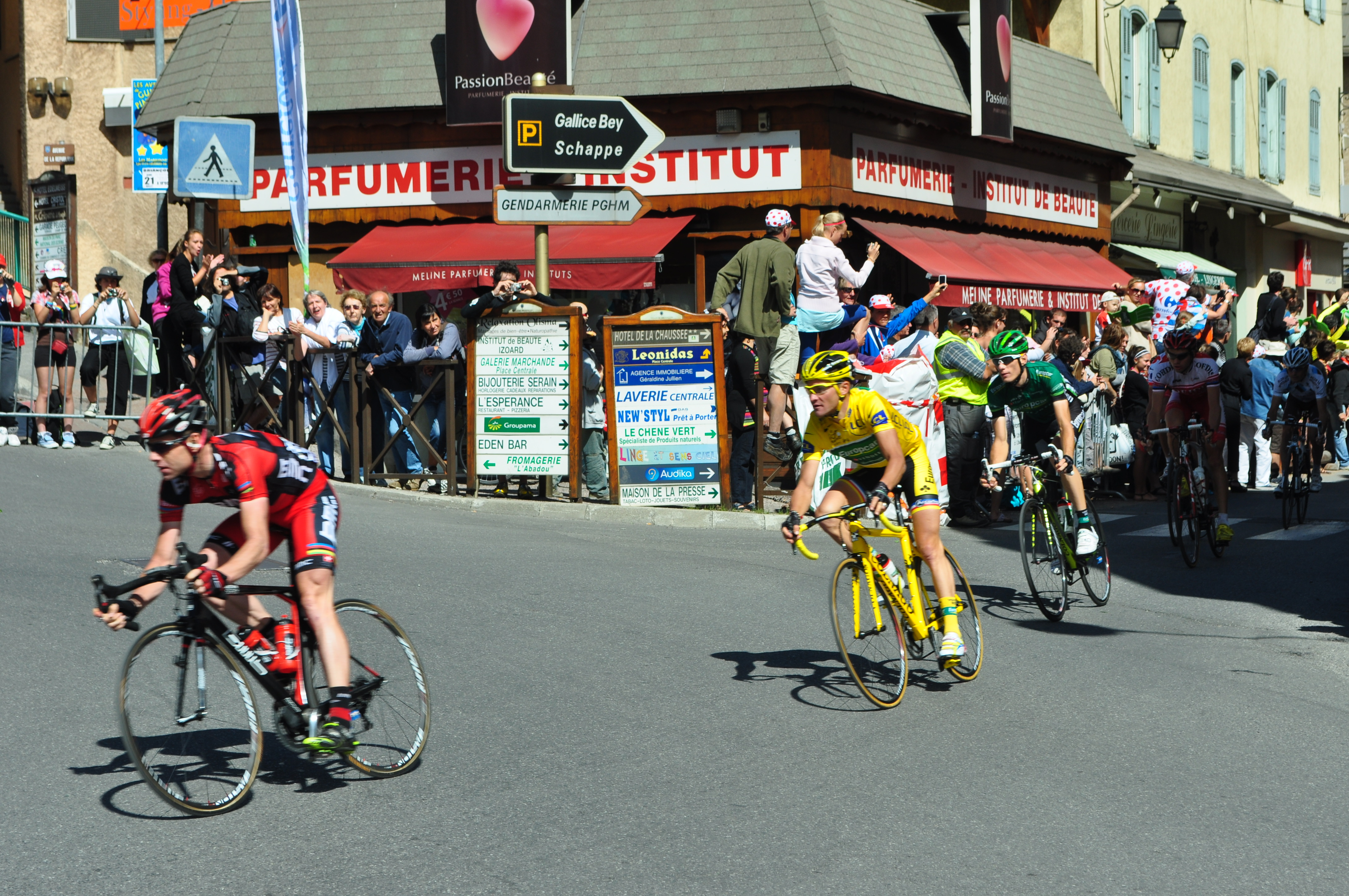
Voeckler riding behind Cadel Evans during stage 18, the second-to-last day he wore the yellow jersey.

The stage 20 individual time trial was to be the Tour's final competitive stage, since its final stage is traditionally mostly ceremonial and only competitive at the sprint finish. Voeckler's position was likely secure, being a minute and 13 seconds behind Evans and a minute and 21 seconds ahead of Damiano Cunego, both time gaps unlikely to be recouped due to Voeckler's and Cunego's limited time trial skills. However, Rolland's position as best young rider remained in play due to his minute and 33 seconds advantage over Taaramäe, and Taaramäe's time trial abilities well superior to Rolland's. Rolland rode one of the best time trials of his career to finish 21st. Taaramäe finished tenth, and took back 47 seconds, but it was insufficient to take back the white jersey. Eight of the nine Team Europcar riders completed the Tour, with the lone exception being Kern who had crashed out of stage 5. Voeckler finished fourth overall and Rolland tenth as the best young rider.

== Season victories ==
Date	Race	Competition	Rider	Country	Location
January 26	La Tropicale Amissa Bongo, Stage 2	UCI Africa Tour	Yohann Gène (FRA)	Cameroon	Ebolowa
January 29	La Tropicale Amissa Bongo, Stage 5	UCI Africa Tour	Yohann Gène (FRA)	Gabon	Kango
January 30	La Tropicale Amissa Bongo, Overall	UCI Africa Tour	Anthony Charteau (FRA)	Gabon	
January 30	La Tropicale Amissa Bongo, Teams classification	UCI Africa Tour	(Note: The riders on the squad were Anthony Charteau, Giovanni Bernaudeau, Mathieu Claude, Yohann Gène, Vincent Jérôme, and Franck Bouyer)	Gabon	
February 6	Étoile de Bessèges, Stage 5	UCI Europe Tour	Saïd Haddou (FRA)	France	Bessèges
February 9	Tour Méditerranéen, Stage 1	UCI Europe Tour	Thomas Voeckler (FRA)	France	Pertuis
February 20	Tour du Haut Var, Overall	UCI Europe Tour	Thomas Voeckler (FRA)	France	
February 20	Tour du Haut Var, Points classification	UCI Europe Tour	Thomas Voeckler (FRA)	France	
February 22	Tour of South Africa, Stage 3	UCI Africa Tour	Yohann Gène (FRA)	South Africa	Summerstrand
February 26	Tour of South Africa, Points classification	UCI Africa Tour	Yohann Gène (FRA)	South Africa	
February 26	Tour of South Africa, Teams classification	UCI Africa Tour	(Note: The riders on the squad were Anthony Charteau, Giovanni Bernaudeau, Tony Hurel, Yohann Gène, Perrig Quéméneur, and Kévin Reza)	South Africa	
March 9	Paris–Nice, Stage 4	UCI World Tour	Thomas Voeckler (FRA)	France	Belleville
March 13	Paris–Nice, Stage 8	UCI World Tour	Thomas Voeckler (FRA)	France	Nice
March 20	Cholet-Pays de Loire	UCI Europe Tour	Thomas Voeckler (FRA)	France	Cholet
March 20	La Roue Tourangelle	UCI Europe Tour	David Veilleux (CAN)	France	Tours
April 17	Tro-Bro Léon	UCI Europe Tour	Vincent Jérôme (FRA)	France	Lannilis
April 20	Giro del Trentino, Stage 2	UCI Europe Tour	Thomas Voeckler (FRA)	Italy	Ledro Bezzecca
May 7	Four Days of Dunkirk, Stage 4	UCI Europe Tour	Thomas Voeckler (FRA)	France	Cassel
May 8	Four Days of Dunkirk, Overall	UCI Europe Tour	Thomas Voeckler (FRA)	France	
May 19	Circuit de Lorraine, Stage 2	UCI Europe Tour	Sébastien Chavanel (FRA)	France	Commercy
June 10	Critérium du Dauphiné, Stage 5	UCI World Tour	Christophe Kern (FRA)	France	Les Gets
June 12	Critérium du Dauphiné, Teams classification	UCI World Tour	(Note: The riders on the squad were Thomas Voeckler, Yukiya Arashiro, Sébastien Chavanel, Cyril Gautier, Vincent Jérôme, Christophe Kern, Perrig Quéméneur and Pierre Rolland)	France	
June 16	Boucles de la Mayenne, Prologue	UCI Europe Tour	Sébastien Turgot (FRA)	France	Laval
June 17	Route du Sud, Stage 2	UCI Europe Tour	Anthony Charteau (FRA)	France	Cauterets
June 19	Boucles de la Mayenne, Teams classification	UCI Europe Tour	(Note: The riders on the squad were Franck Bouyer, Mathieu Claude, Jérôme Cousin, Damien Gaudin, Vincent Jérôme and Sébastien Turgot)	France	
July 22	Tour de France, Stage 19	UCI World Tour	Pierre Rolland (FRA)	France	Alpe d'Huez
July 24	Tour de France, Young rider classification	UCI World Tour	Pierre Rolland (FRA)	France	
August 26	Tour du Poitou-Charentes, Mountains classification	UCI Europe Tour	Alexandre Pichot (FRA)	France	
August 26	Tour du Poitou-Charentes, Sprint classification	UCI Europe Tour	Damien Gaudin (FRA)	France	

== Away from competition ==
=== Change of title sponsor ===
Midway through the 2010 season, Bouygues Telecom announced that they wished to reduce their involvement in financing the team, and were interested in continuing their partnership with the squad. This was on the proviso that team manager Jean-René Bernaudeau could find a primary sponsor that would allow Bouygues Telecom to contribute €1 million to the team's budget, but the rest of its finances would be covered by an incoming sponsor. At this point in time, the team had lodged an application to become a UCI ProTeam once again in 2011. Following his victory in the inaugural Grand Prix Cycliste de Québec, Voeckler was complacent about his team's future, believing his team manager Bernaudeau would eventually find a sponsor. Bernaudeau himself was still hopeful of acquiring a deal at that point, but that deadlines were working against him in order for the team to return as a professional team from the 2011 season onwards.

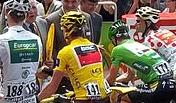
Rolland, at far left, before the start of the Tour's final stage, with the other jersey winners, shows the Europcar logo.

After talks with an organisation in Paris, which later turned out to be French multinational oil company Total, Bernaudeau set his sights on another company, a banking group, and at best, rated his team's chances of survival as "6 out of 10". Voeckler was equally pessimistic about the team's chances of survival, having stated that the team could not have done any better, than they had in 2010. Voeckler had also received offers from rival French squads Cofidis and Saur–Sojasun about joining their respective teams, if in the worst-case scenario that Bbox Bouygues Telecom folded. Bernaudeau obtained an extension from the Union Cycliste Internationale, in relation to the registration records for the team, which had to be submitted before 1 October.

Ultimately, Voeckler signed a contract with Cofidis on 1 October, which would have only become official if Bbox Bouygues Telecom folded. Voeckler announced a complete U-turn on his move a day later, with preliminary reports from France stating that the team had indeed found a sponsor – on a three-year deal from the 2011 season onwards – and that it was car rental company Europcar that had joined the team as sponsor on the proviso that Voeckler, the French national champion, was part of the team's roster. The deal was officially confirmed later that day, but the team were no longer eligible to apply for a ProTeam licence due to the delay in finding a sponsor. Bernaudeau sent the team's dossier to the Union Cycliste Internationale on 4 October, requesting Professional Continental status for another year; this status was granted in November.
