= 2010 Bbox Bouygues Telecom season =

2010 Bbox Bouygues Telecom season
Manager	Jean-René Bernaudeau
One-day victories	2
Stage race overall victories	2
Stage race stage victories	11
Previous season • Next season

The 2010 season for Bbox Bouygues Telecom began in January with La Tropicale Amissa Bongo and ended in October at the Japan Cup. It is the team's first season as a UCI Professional Continental team, after being relegated from UCI ProTour status after the 2009 season. The team had been part of the ProTour since the ProTour's inception in 2005. The team carries wildcard status in 2010, meaning they are eligible to be invited to any ProTour event should the organizers wish to include them.

The team's manager is former cyclist Jean-René Bernaudeau, who has led the team since its origination. The team nearly folded at the end of 2010, after a search for a title sponsor to replace the outgoing Bouygues group proved very difficult. Europcar came forward at the last moment to save the team.

== 2010 roster ==
Ages as of January 1, 2010.

Rider	Date of birth
Yukiya Arashiro (JPN)	September 22, 1984 (aged 25)
Freddy Bichot (FRA)	September 9, 1979 (aged 30)
Giovanni Bernaudeau (FRA)	August 25, 1983 (aged 26)
William Bonnet (FRA)	May 6, 1983 (aged 26)
Franck Bouyer (FRA)	March 17, 1974 (aged 35)
Steve Chainel (FRA)	September 6, 1983 (aged 26)
Anthony Charteau (FRA)	June 4, 1979 (aged 30)
Mathieu Claude (FRA)	March 17, 1983 (aged 26)
Jérôme Cousin (FRA)	June 5, 1989 (aged 20)
Pierrick Fédrigo (FRA)	November 30, 1978 (aged 31)
Damien Gaudin (FRA)	August 20, 1986 (aged 23)
Cyril Gautier (FRA)	September 26, 1987 (aged 22)
Yohann Gène (FRA)	June 25, 1981 (aged 28)

Rider	Date of birth
Saïd Haddou (FRA)	November 23, 1982 (aged 27)
Vincent Jérôme (FRA)	November 26, 1984 (aged 25)
Guillaume Le Floch (FRA)	February 16, 1985 (aged 24)
Laurent Lefèvre (FRA)	July 2, 1976 (aged 33)
Alexandre Pichot (FRA)	January 6, 1983 (aged 26)
Perrig Quéméneur (FRA)	April 26, 1984 (aged 25)
Pierre Rolland (FRA)	October 10, 1986 (aged 23)
Matthieu Sprick (FRA)	September 29, 1981 (aged 28)
Yuri Trofimov (RUS)	January 26, 1984 (aged 25)
Johann Tschopp (SUI)	July 1, 1982 (aged 27)
Sébastien Turgot (FRA)	April 11, 1984 (aged 25)
Thomas Voeckler (FRA)	June 22, 1979 (aged 30)
Nicolas Vogondy (FRA)	August 8, 1977 (aged 32)

Riders who joined the team for the 2010 season

Rider	2009 team
Freddy Bichot	Agritubel
Anthony Charteau	Caisse d'Epargne
Jérôme Cousin	neo-pro
Nicolas Vogondy	Agritubel

Riders who left the team during or after the 2009 season

Rider	2010 team
Julien Belgy	Free agent
Olivier Bonnaire	Française des Jeux
Arnaud Labbe	Free agent
Rony Martias	Saur-Sojasun
Evgeny Sokolov	Free agent

== Stage races ==
The team opened their season in Africa, at La Tropicale Amissa Bongo, in the nation of Gabon. After first taking the overall lead in stage 3, Charteau backed it up with a stage win from a breakaway the next day, padding his lead. Gène and Bernaudeau finished in the top two positions in a mass sprint finish to stage 5 a day later. Charteau won the race overall the next day by finishing with the peloton in a stage conquered by a breakaway.

== Grand Tours ==
=== Giro d'Italia ===
Bbox was one of 22 teams in the Giro d'Italia. They sent a squad headed by Voeckler and there with the express goal of trying for stage wins. The team was not competitive in the Giro's opening stages in the Netherlands. They did not have any riders contesting the sprint finishes to the first two road race stages, and their highest-placed man in the overall standings prior to the transfer to Italy was Bonnet in 40th place. Their fortunes changed little in the stage 4 team time trial, when they finished 17th.

In stage 5, Arashiro instigated the day's principal breakaway 25 km (16 mi) into the stage. He and two of the three riders who first broke away with him stayed away to the finish line, coming home 4 seconds ahead of a fast-charging peloton that had just mistimed the catch. Arashiro was last of the three in the sprint for the stage win, but received much praise for his combativity on the stage in starting the break and in his pacemaking, which helped them stay away. The next day's stage featured a depleted group sprint for the high stage placings available to the peloton after a two-man breakaway stayed away to the finish. Bonnet took sixth in this stage.

The team was then quiet until stage 12. With a field sprint seemingly shaping up as the stage neared its conclusion, a counterattack made as the day's principal breakaway was caught got ten riders to the finish line 10 seconds ahead of the peloton. Voeckler made this split, but just missed out on the stage win, finishing second to Filippo Pozzato in the sprint. Voeckler said after the stage that he was satisfied with his ride even though he narrowly missed a victory, stating that Pozzato is simply the better sprinter. The next day's stage featured a winning morning breakaway. Claude was part of this group, though he was only seventh out of nine in the sprint for the stage win.

The team claimed their only win of the Giro in the queen stage, stage 20. Tschopp and Gilberto Simoni were the day's principal escape group. After Tschopp beat Simoni to the top of the Passo di Gavia for the prize money that went along with winning the Cima Coppi, the Giro's tallest climb, he rode an aggressive descent of the mountain and was out front for the entirety of the stage. Tschopp climbed the Passo del Tonale alone en route to victory 16 seconds ahead of Cadel Evans in second place. He was the first Swiss rider to win a stage at the Giro since Alex Zülle in 1998. The team's highest-placed rider in the final overall standings was Voeckler in 23rd. They finished tenth in the Trofeo Fast Team standings and 15th in the Trofeo Super Team.

=== Tour de France ===
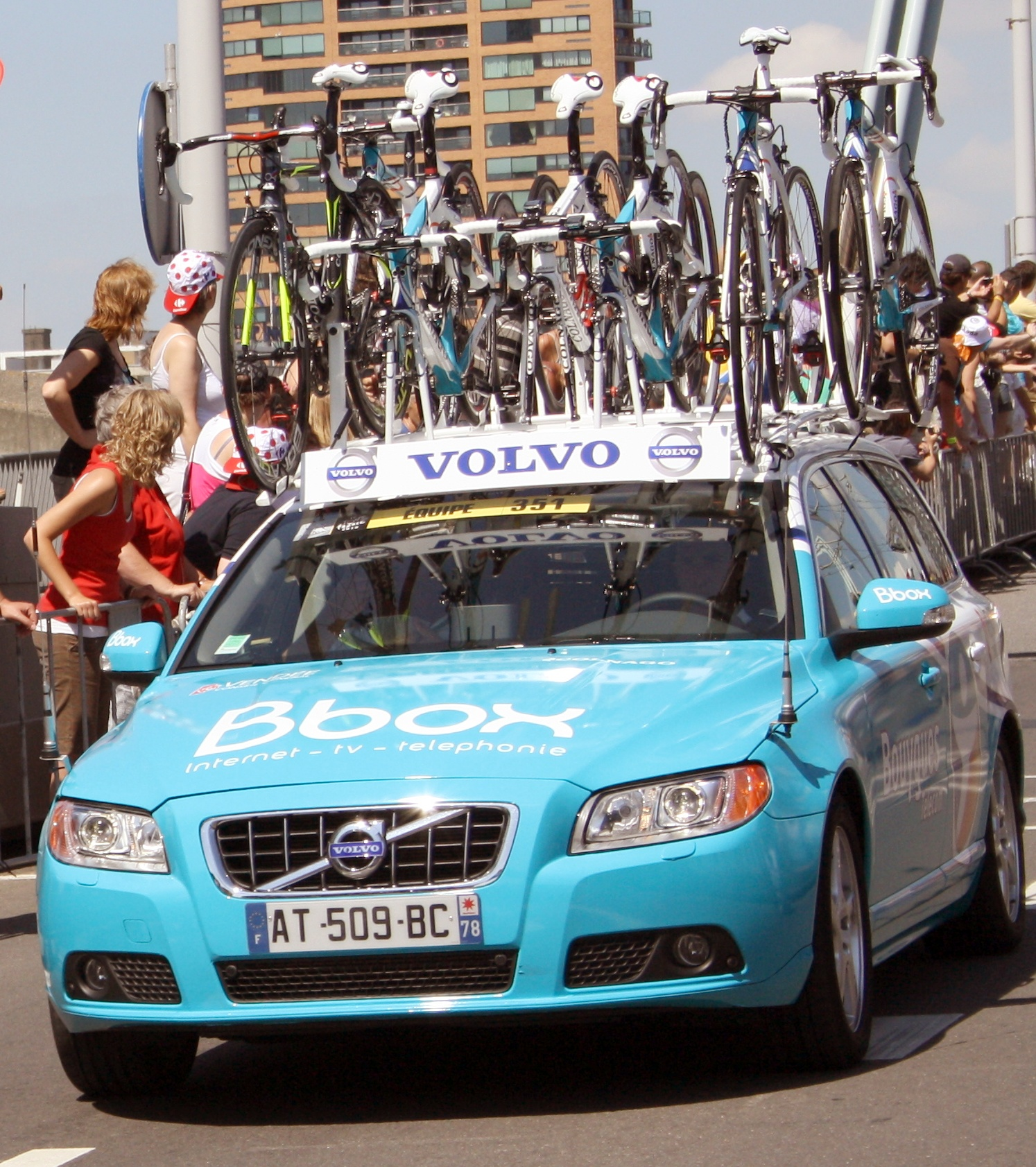
The Bbox team car at the start of stage 1 in Rotterdam.

Voeckler led the squad sent to the Tour de France, again seeking stage wins. The squad was combative in the Tour's early flat stages, making morning breakaways in stages 2, 3, 4, and 6. Turgot took fifth place in back-to-back field sprints, in stages 5 and 6. After taking mountains points in morning breakaways in several previous stages, Charteau took the polka-dot jersey after stage 9, again making the breakaway. This one stayed away to decide the stage, though Charteau did not contest the sprint, finishing in fifth place two seconds behind Sandy Casar, Luis León Sánchez, and Damiano Cunego. He lost it to Jérôme Pineau the next day, but took it back again after stage 12. From this point on, there was not much competition in the mountains classification. The race's elite riders took some of the more difficult climbs, like the Col du Tourmalet, while other breakaways involving riders who had not yet scored many points took place on other climbs. Christophe Moreau came close to challenging Charteau for the jersey, but Charteau clinched it after stage 17 when he and Moreau both failed to score further – none of the stages after 17 had any categorized climbs, so Charteau needed only to finish the race to win the classification, which he did.

The team also had consecutive stage wins in the race's final week. Voeckler soloed to victory in stage 15 up the Port de Balès and arrived in Bagneres-de-Luchon with a comfortable margin of a minute and a half over the remnants of the morning breakaway he had left behind and nearly three minutes over the race's elite riders. The next day, Fédrigo won in Pau on a stage that had been targeted by Lance Armstrong. Eight of nine riders from an early breakaway, Fédrigo and Armstrong among them, finished together after riding over the hors catégorie Col du Tourmalet and Col d'Aspin climbs. Charteau was the team's highest-placed rider in Paris, finishing the Tour in 44th place, at a deficit of 1 hour, 24 minutes, and 12 seconds to Tour champion Alberto Contador. The squad was tenth in the teams classification.

=== Vuelta a España ===
Bbox attended the Vuelta a España, but was shut out of any noteworthy results. Tschopp's third place from a breakaway in stage 8 on the Xorret de Catí was the only time they so much as finished in the top ten of a stage. The squad's highest-placed rider in the final overall standings was Sprick in 54th, at a deficit of an hour and 45 minutes to Vuelta champion Vincenzo Nibali. The squad was 19th in the teams classification, better only than the small Spanish teams Andalucía–Cajasur and Footon–Servetto–Fuji.

== Season victories ==
Date	Race	Competition	Rider	Country	Location
January 22	La Tropicale Amissa Bongo, Stage 4	UCI Africa Tour	Anthony Charteau (FRA)	Gabon	Lambaréné
January 23	La Tropicale Amissa Bongo, Stage 5	UCI Africa Tour	Yohann Gène (FRA)	Gabon	Kango
January 24	La Tropicale Amissa Bongo, Overall	UCI Africa Tour	Anthony Charteau (FRA)	Gabon	
March 9	Paris–Nice, Stage 2	UCI World Ranking	William Bonnet (FRA)	France	Limoges
March 27	Critérium International, Stage 1	UCI Europe Tour	Pierrick Fédrigo (FRA)	France	Col de l'Ospedale
March 28	Critérium International, Overall	UCI Europe Tour	Pierrick Fédrigo (FRA)	France	
March 28	Critérium International, Points classification	UCI Europe Tour	Pierrick Fédrigo (FRA)	France	
March 28	Critérium International, Mountains classification	UCI Europe Tour	Pierre Rolland (FRA)	France	
March 30	Three Days of De Panne, Stage 1	UCI Europe Tour	Steve Chainel (FRA)	Belgium	Oudenaarde
March 31	Three Days of De Panne, Stage 2	UCI Europe Tour	Sébastien Turgot (FRA)	Belgium	Saint-Idesbald
April 2	Route Adélie de Vitré	UCI Europe Tour	Cyril Gautier (FRA)	France	Vitré
May 22	Circuit de Lorraine, Stage 4	UCI Europe Tour	Pierre Rolland (FRA)	France	Belleville-sur-Meuse
May 23	Circuit de Lorraine, Teams classification	UCI Europe Tour	(Note: The riders on the squad were Freddy Bichot, Steve Chainel, Cyril Gautier, Matthieu Sprick, Laurent Lefèvre, Nicolas Vogondy, and Pierre Rolland)	France	
May 29	Giro d'Italia, Stage 20	UCI World Ranking	Johann Tschopp (SWI)	Italy	Passo del Tonale
June 10	Critérium du Dauphiné, Stage 4	UCI World Ranking	Nicolas Vogondy (FRA)	France	Risoul
July 19	Tour de France, Stage 15	UCI World Ranking	Thomas Voeckler (FRA)	France	Bagnères-de-Luchon
July 20	Tour de France, Stage 16	UCI World Ranking	Pierrick Fédrigo (FRA)	France	Pau
July 25	Tour de France, Mountains classification	UCI World Ranking	Anthony Charteau (FRA)	France	
September 10	Grand Prix Cycliste de Québec	UCI ProTour	Thomas Voeckler (FRA)	Canada	Quebec City
