= 2011 Paris–Nice =

2011 UCI World Tour, race 2 of 27
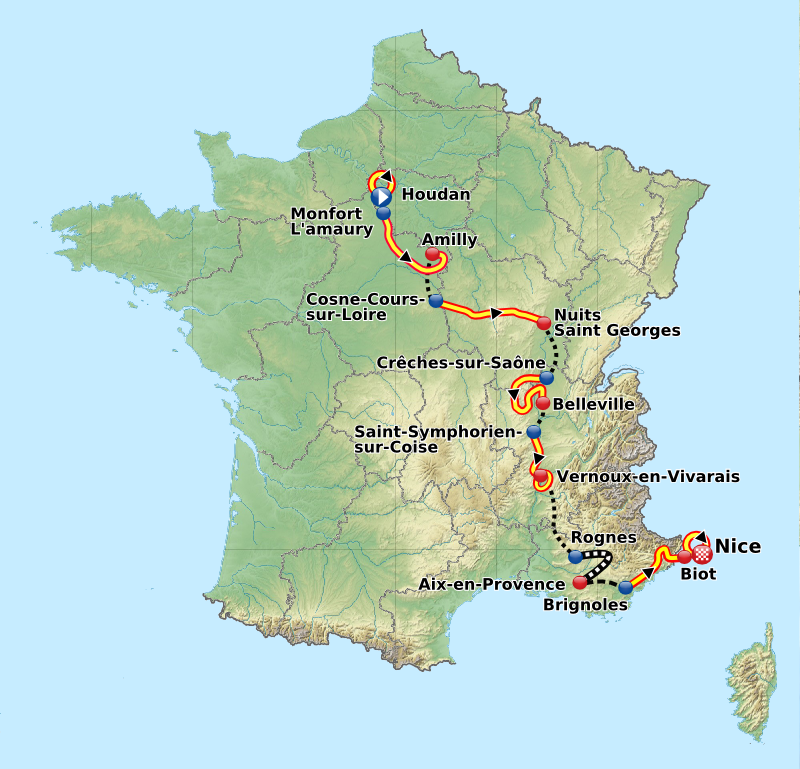

Race details
- Dates: 6–13 March 2011
- Stages: 8
- Distance: 1,307 km (812 mi)
- Winning time: 34h 03' 37"

Results
Jersey awarded to the overall winner	Winner	Tony Martin (Germany)	(HTC–Highroad)
	Second	Andreas Klöden (Germany)	(Team RadioShack)
	Third	Bradley Wiggins (Great Britain)	(Team Sky)
Jersey awarded to the points classification winner	Points	Heinrich Haussler (Australia)	(Garmin–Cervélo)
Jersey awarded to the mountains classification winner	Mountains	Rémi Pauriol (France)	(FDJ)
Jersey awarded to the young rider classification winner	Young rider	Rein Taaramäe (Estonia)	(Cofidis)
	Team	Team RadioShack	

The 2011 Paris–Nice was the 69th running of the Paris–Nice cycling stage race, often known as the Race to the Sun. It started on 6 March in Houdan and ended on 13 March in Nice and consisted of eight stages, including a time trial. It was the second race of the 2011 UCI World Tour season.

The race was won by HTC–Highroad rider Tony Martin, after holding onto the leader's yellow jersey which came from a time trial stage win on stage six. Martin's winning margin over runner-up and fellow German Andreas Klöden (Team RadioShack) – winner of the fifth stage of the race – was 36 seconds, with Team Sky's Bradley Wiggins completing the podium, 41 seconds down on Martin.

In the race's other classifications, Rein Taaramäe of Cofidis won the white jersey for the highest placed rider under the age of 25, and Garmin–Cervélo's Heinrich Haussler took home the green jersey for amassing the highest number of points during stages at intermediate sprints and stage finishes. FDJ rider Rémi Pauriol won the King of the Mountains classification, with Team RadioShack finishing at the head of the teams classification.

== Teams ==
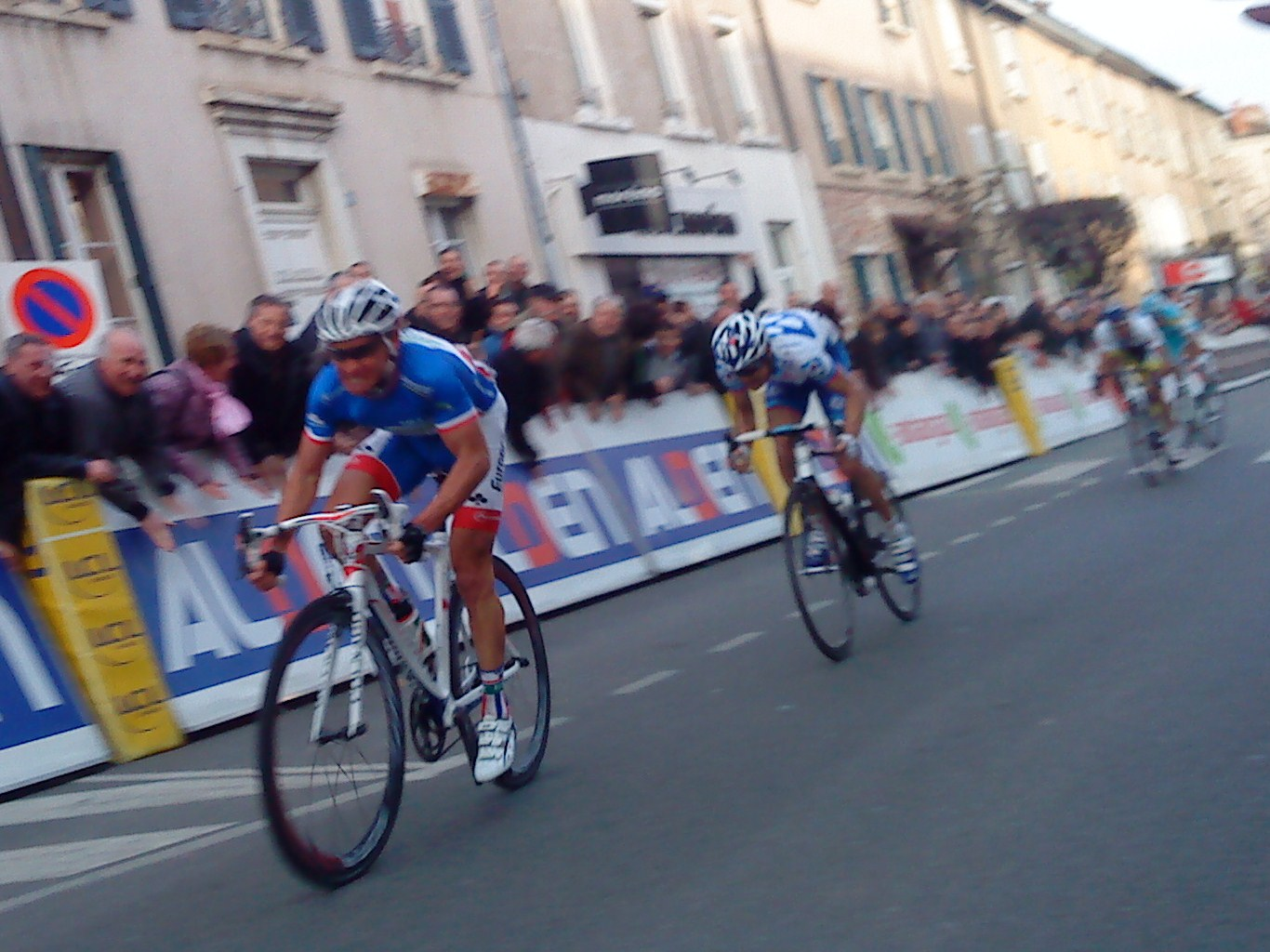
Thomas Voeckler wins sprint finish to end stage four

22 teams were invited to the 2011 Paris–Nice. The teams were:

- Ag2r–La Mondiale
- Astana
- BMC Racing Team
- Bretagne–Schuller
- Cofidis
- Team Europcar
- Euskaltel–Euskadi
- FDJ
- Garmin–Cervélo
- Lampre–ISD
- Leopard Trek
- Liquigas–Cannondale
- Omega Pharma–Lotto
- Quick-Step
- Rabobank
- HTC–Highroad
- Team Katusha
- Movistar Team
- Team RadioShack
- Saxo Bank–SunGard
- Team Sky
- Vacansoleil–DCM

== Route ==
Stage characteristics and winners
Stage	Date	Course	Distance	Type	Winner
1	6 March	Houdan to Houdan	154.5 km (96.0 mi)	Flat stage	Thomas De Gendt (BEL)
2	7 March	Montfort-l'Amaury to Amilly	198.5 km (123.3 mi)	Flat stage	Greg Henderson (NZL)
3	8 March	Cosne-Cours-sur-Loire to Nuits-Saint-Georges	202.5 km (125.8 mi)	Hilly stage	Matthew Goss (AUS)
4	9 March	Crêches-sur-Saône to Belleville	191 km (119 mi)	Hilly stage	Thomas Voeckler (FRA)
5	10 March	Saint-Symphorien-sur-Coise to Vernoux-en-Vivarais	194 km (121 mi)	Medium mountain stage	Andreas Klöden (GER)
6	11 March	Rognes to Aix-en-Provence	27 km (17 mi)	Individual time trial	Tony Martin (GER)
7	12 March	Brignoles to Biot	215.5 km (133.9 mi)	Medium mountain stage	Rémy Di Gregorio (FRA)
8	13 March	Nice to Nice	124 km (77 mi)	Medium mountain stage	Thomas Voeckler (FRA)

== Stages ==
=== Stage 1 ===
6 March 2011 – Houdan to Houdan, 154.5 km (96.0 mi)

Stage 1 Result

	Rider	Team	Time
1	Thomas De Gendt (BEL)	Vacansoleil–DCM	4h 05' 06"
2	Jérémy Roy (FRA)	FDJ	s.t.
3	Heinrich Haussler (AUS)	Garmin–Cervélo	s.t.
4	Peter Sagan (SVK)	Liquigas–Cannondale	s.t.
5	Greg Henderson (NZL)	Team Sky	s.t.
6	Jens Voigt (GER)	Leopard Trek	s.t.
7	Wouter Weylandt (BEL)	Leopard Trek	s.t.
8	Danilo Wyss (SUI)	BMC Racing Team	s.t.
9	Romain Feillu (FRA)	Vacansoleil–DCM	s.t.
10	Gert Steegmans (BEL)	Quick-Step	s.t.

General Classification after Stage 1

	Rider	Team	Time
1	Thomas De Gendt (BEL)	Vacansoleil–DCM	4h 04' 53"
2	Jérémy Roy (FRA)	FDJ	+ 6"
3	Heinrich Haussler (AUS)	Garmin–Cervélo	+ 9"
4	Damien Gaudin (FRA)	Team Europcar	+ 10"
5	Jens Voigt (GER)	Leopard Trek	+ 11"
6	Romain Feillu (FRA)	Vacansoleil–DCM	+ 12"
7	Peter Sagan (SVK)	Liquigas–Cannondale	+ 13"
8	Greg Henderson (NZL)	Team Sky	+ 13"
9	Wouter Weylandt (BEL)	Leopard Trek	+ 13"
10	Danilo Wyss (SUI)	BMC Racing Team	+ 13"

=== Stage 2 ===
7 March 2011 – Montfort-l'Amaury to Amilly, 198.5 km (123.3 mi)

Stage 2 Result

	Rider	Team	Time
1	Greg Henderson (NZL)	Team Sky	5h 00' 56"
2	Matthew Goss (AUS)	HTC–Highroad	s.t.
3	Denis Galimzyanov (RUS)	Team Katusha	s.t.
4	Heinrich Haussler (AUS)	Garmin–Cervélo	s.t.
5	Peter Sagan (SVK)	Liquigas–Cannondale	s.t.
6	Romain Feillu (FRA)	Vacansoleil–DCM	s.t.
7	Jürgen Roelandts (BEL)	Omega Pharma–Lotto	s.t.
8	José Joaquín Rojas (ESP)	Movistar Team	s.t.
9	Tomas Vaitkus (LTU)	Astana	s.t.
10	Danilo Wyss (SUI)	BMC Racing Team	s.t.

General Classification after Stage 2

	Rider	Team	Time
1	Thomas De Gendt (BEL)	Vacansoleil–DCM	9h 05' 48"
2	Greg Henderson (NZL)	Team Sky	+ 4"
3	Jérémy Roy (FRA)	FDJ	+ 7"
4	Matthew Goss (AUS)	HTC–Highroad	+ 8"
5	Tony Gallopin (FRA)	Cofidis	+ 8"
6	Heinrich Haussler (AUS)	Garmin–Cervélo	+ 10"
7	Denis Galimzyanov (RUS)	Team Katusha	+ 10"
8	Jens Voigt (GER)	Leopard Trek	+ 12"
9	Romain Feillu (FRA)	Vacansoleil–DCM	+ 13"
10	Peter Sagan (SVK)	Liquigas–Cannondale	+ 14"

=== Stage 3 ===
8 March 2011 – Cosne-Cours-sur-Loire to Nuits-Saint-Georges, 202.5 km (125.8 mi)

Stage 3 Result

	Rider	Team	Time
1	Matthew Goss (AUS)	HTC–Highroad	5h 16' 48"
2	Heinrich Haussler (AUS)	Garmin–Cervélo	s.t.
3	Denis Galimzyanov (RUS)	Team Katusha	s.t.
4	José Joaquín Rojas (ESP)	Movistar Team	s.t.
5	Geraint Thomas (GBR)	Team Sky	s.t.
6	Greg Henderson (NZL)	Team Sky	s.t.
7	Anthony Ravard (FRA)	Ag2r–La Mondiale	s.t.
8	Francesco Gavazzi (ITA)	Lampre–ISD	s.t.
9	Romain Feillu (FRA)	Vacansoleil–DCM	s.t.
10	Valerio Agnoli (ITA)	Liquigas–Cannondale	s.t.

General Classification after Stage 3

	Rider	Team	Time
1	Matthew Goss (AUS)	HTC–Highroad	14h 22' 34"
2	Thomas De Gendt (BEL)	Vacansoleil–DCM	+ 2"
3	Heinrich Haussler (AUS)	Garmin–Cervélo	+ 6"
4	Greg Henderson (NZL)	Team Sky	+ 6"
5	Denis Galimzyanov (RUS)	Team Katusha	+ 8"
6	Jérémy Roy (FRA)	FDJ	+ 9"
7	Tony Gallopin (FRA)	Cofidis	+ 10"
8	Cyril Gautier (FRA)	Team Europcar	+ 11"
9	Cédric Pineau (FRA)	FDJ	+ 11"
10	Jens Voigt (GER)	Leopard Trek	+ 14"

=== Stage 4 ===
9 March 2011 – Crêches-sur-Saône to Belleville, 191 km (118.7 mi)

Stage 4 Result

	Rider	Team	Time
1	Thomas Voeckler (FRA)	Team Europcar	5h 04' 20"
2	Rémi Pauriol (FRA)	FDJ	s.t.
3	Thomas De Gendt (BEL)	Vacansoleil–DCM	s.t.
4	Rémy Di Gregorio (FRA)	Astana	s.t.
5	Heinrich Haussler (AUS)	Garmin–Cervélo	+ 13"
6	Peter Sagan (SVK)	Liquigas–Cannondale	+ 13"
7	Romain Feillu (FRA)	Vacansoleil–DCM	+ 13"
8	Samuel Dumoulin (FRA)	Cofidis	+ 13"
9	Grega Bole (SLO)	Lampre–ISD	+ 13"
10	Danilo Wyss (SUI)	BMC Racing Team	+ 13"

General Classification after Stage 4

	Rider	Team	Time
1	Thomas De Gendt (BEL)	Vacansoleil–DCM	19h 26' 46"
2	Thomas Voeckler (FRA)	Team Europcar	+ 10"
3	Rémi Pauriol (FRA)	FDJ	+ 16"
4	Matthew Goss (AUS)	HTC–Highroad	+ 21"
5	Rémy Di Gregorio (FRA)	Astana	+ 24"
6	Heinrich Haussler (AUS)	Garmin–Cervélo	+ 27"
7	Jérémy Roy (FRA)	FDJ	+ 30"
8	Tony Gallopin (FRA)	Cofidis	+ 31"
9	Cyril Gautier (FRA)	Team Europcar	+ 32"
10	Jens Voigt (GER)	Leopard Trek	+ 35"

=== Stage 5 ===
10 March 2011 – Saint-Symphorien-sur-Coise to Vernoux-en-Vivarais, 194 km (120.5 mi)

Stage 5 Result

	Rider	Team	Time
1	Andreas Klöden (GER)	Team RadioShack	4h 59' 00"
2	Samuel Sánchez (ESP)	Euskaltel–Euskadi	s.t.
3	Matteo Carrara (ITA)	Vacansoleil–DCM	s.t.
4	Tony Martin (GER)	HTC–Highroad	s.t.
5	Rein Taaramäe (EST)	Cofidis	s.t.
6	Robert Kišerlovski (CRO)	Astana	s.t.
7	Janez Brajkovič (SLO)	Team RadioShack	s.t.
8	Xavier Tondó (ESP)	Movistar Team	s.t.
9	Luis León Sánchez (ESP)	Rabobank	+ 18"
10	Pierre Rolland (FRA)	Team Europcar	+ 19"

General Classification after Stage 5

	Rider	Team	Time
1	Andreas Klöden (GER)	Team RadioShack	24h 26' 13"
2	Samuel Sánchez (ESP)	Euskaltel–Euskadi	+ 4"
3	Matteo Carrara (ITA)	Vacansoleil–DCM	+ 6"
4	Tony Martin (GER)	HTC–Highroad	+ 10"
5	Robert Kišerlovski (CRO)	Astana	+ 10"
6	Janez Brajkovič (SLO)	Team RadioShack	+ 10"
7	Xavier Tondó (ESP)	Movistar Team	+ 10"
8	Rein Taaramäe (EST)	Cofidis	+ 10"
9	Luis León Sánchez (ESP)	Rabobank	+ 28"
10	Roman Kreuziger (CZE)	Astana	+ 29"

=== Stage 6 ===
11 March 2011 – Rognes to Aix-en-Provence, 27 km (16.8 mi), (ITT)

Stage 6 Result

	Rider	Team	Time
1	Tony Martin (GER)	HTC–Highroad	33' 24"
2	Bradley Wiggins (GBR)	Team Sky	+ 20"
3	Richie Porte (AUS)	Saxo Bank–SunGard	+ 29"
4	Andreas Klöden (GER)	Team RadioShack	+ 46"
5	Jean-Christophe Péraud (FRA)	Ag2r–La Mondiale	+ 55"
6	Lieuwe Westra (NED)	Vacansoleil–DCM	+ 57"
7	Andrew Talansky (USA)	Garmin–Cervélo	+ 1' 05"
8	Rein Taaramäe (EST)	Cofidis	+ 1' 10"
9	Levi Leipheimer (USA)	Team RadioShack	+ 1' 10"
10	Tejay van Garderen (USA)	HTC–Highroad	+ 1' 29"

General Classification after Stage 6

	Rider	Team	Time
1	Tony Martin (GER)	HTC–Highroad	24h 59' 47"
2	Andreas Klöden (GER)	Team RadioShack	+ 36"
3	Bradley Wiggins (GBR)	Team Sky	+ 39"
4	Rein Taaramäe (EST)	Cofidis	+ 1' 10"
5	Jean-Christophe Péraud (FRA)	Ag2r–La Mondiale	+ 1' 14"
6	Levi Leipheimer (USA)	Team RadioShack	+ 1' 29"
7	Janez Brajkovič (SLO)	Team RadioShack	+ 1' 32"
8	Samuel Sánchez (ESP)	Euskaltel–Euskadi	+ 1' 37"
9	Xavier Tondó (ESP)	Movistar Team	+ 1' 51"
10	Bauke Mollema (NED)	Rabobank	+ 1' 57"

=== Stage 7 ===
12 March 2011 – Brignoles to Biot, 215.5 km (133.9 mi)

Stage 7 Result

	Rider	Team	Time
1	Rémy Di Gregorio (FRA)	Astana	5h 46' 23"
2	Samuel Sánchez (ESP)	Euskaltel–Euskadi	+ 5"
3	Rigoberto Urán (COL)	Team Sky	+ 5"
4	Andreas Klöden (GER)	Team RadioShack	+ 7"
5	Tony Martin (GER)	HTC–Highroad	+ 7"
6	Rein Taaramäe (EST)	Cofidis	+ 7"
7	Janez Brajkovič (SLO)	Team RadioShack	+ 9"
8	Bradley Wiggins (GBR)	Team Sky	+ 9"
9	Xavier Tondó (ESP)	Movistar Team	+ 9"
10	Maxime Monfort (BEL)	Leopard Trek	+ 11"

General Classification after Stage 7

	Rider	Team	Time
1	Tony Martin (GER)	HTC–Highroad	30h 46' 17"
2	Andreas Klöden (GER)	Team RadioShack	+ 36"
3	Bradley Wiggins (GBR)	Team Sky	+ 41"
4	Rein Taaramäe (EST)	Cofidis	+ 1' 10"
5	Jean-Christophe Péraud (FRA)	Ag2r–La Mondiale	+ 1' 21"
6	Samuel Sánchez (ESP)	Euskaltel–Euskadi	+ 1' 29"
7	Janez Brajkovič (SLO)	Team RadioShack	+ 1' 34"
8	Levi Leipheimer (USA)	Team RadioShack	+ 1' 36"
9	Xavier Tondó (ESP)	Movistar Team	+ 1' 53"
10	Bauke Mollema (NED)	Rabobank	+ 2' 04"

=== Stage 8 ===
13 March 2011 – Nice to Nice, 124 km (77.1 mi)

Stage 8 Result

	Rider	Team	Time
1	Thomas Voeckler (FRA)	Team Europcar	3h 15' 58"
2	Diego Ulissi (ITA)	Lampre–ISD	+ 23"
3	Julien El Fares (FRA)	Cofidis	+ 1' 06"
4	Samuel Sánchez (ESP)	Euskaltel–Euskadi	+ 1' 06"
5	David López García (ESP)	Movistar Team	+ 1' 06"
6	Matteo Carrara (ITA)	Vacansoleil–DCM	+ 1' 08"
7	Gorka Izagirre (ESP)	Euskaltel–Euskadi	+ 1' 12"
8	José Joaquín Rojas (ESP)	Movistar Team	+ 1' 22"
9	Simon Špilak (SLO)	Lampre–ISD	+ 1' 22"
10	Tomas Vaitkus (LTU)	Astana	+ 1' 22"

Final General Classification

	Rider	Team	Time
1	Tony Martin (GER)	HTC–Highroad	34h 03' 37"
2	Andreas Klöden (GER)	Team RadioShack	+ 36"
3	Bradley Wiggins (GBR)	Team Sky	+ 41"
4	Rein Taaramäe (EST)	Cofidis	+ 1' 10"
5	Samuel Sánchez (ESP)	Euskaltel–Euskadi	+ 1' 13"
6	Jean-Christophe Péraud (FRA)	Ag2r–La Mondiale	+ 1' 24"
7	Janez Brajkovič (SLO)	Team RadioShack	+ 1' 34"
8	Levi Leipheimer (USA)	Team RadioShack	+ 1' 36"
9	Bauke Mollema (NED)	Rabobank	+ 2' 04"
10	Maxime Monfort (BEL)	Leopard Trek	+ 2' 26"

== Classification leadership progress ==
Stage	Winner	General Classification	Points Classification	Mountains Classification	Young Rider Classification	Team Classification
1	Thomas De Gendt	Thomas De Gendt	Thomas De Gendt	Damien Gaudin	Thomas De Gendt	Vacansoleil–DCM
2	Greg Henderson	Thomas De Gendt	Greg Henderson	Damien Gaudin	Thomas De Gendt	Vacansoleil–DCM
3	Matthew Goss	Matthew Goss	Heinrich Haussler	Jussi Veikkanen	Matthew Goss	Vacansoleil–DCM
4	Thomas Voeckler	Thomas De Gendt	Heinrich Haussler	Rémi Pauriol	Thomas De Gendt	Vacansoleil–DCM
5	Andreas Klöden	Andreas Klöden	Heinrich Haussler	Rémi Pauriol	Robert Kišerlovski	Team RadioShack
6	Tony Martin	Tony Martin	Heinrich Haussler	Rémi Pauriol	Rein Taaramäe	Team RadioShack
7	Rémy Di Gregorio	Tony Martin	Heinrich Haussler	Rémi Pauriol	Rein Taaramäe	Team RadioShack
8	Thomas Voeckler	Tony Martin	Heinrich Haussler	Rémi Pauriol	Rein Taaramäe	Team RadioShack
Final		Tony Martin	Heinrich Haussler	Rémi Pauriol	Rein Taaramäe	Team RadioShack
