= Tour d'Eure-et-Loir =

Annual French cycling competition

Race details
- Date: May
- Region: Eure-et-Loir, France
- Discipline: Road
- Competition: UCI Europe Tour
- Type: Stage race
- Web site: www.tour-eure-et-loir-cycliste.fr

History
- First edition: 1949
- Editions: 56 (as of 2025)
- First winner: Georges Roux (FRA)
- Most wins: Raymond Komor (FRA); Francis Bazire (FRA); Laurent Bezault (FRA); Fabrice Henry (FRA) (2 wins)
- Most recent: Paul Picard (FRA)

The Tour d'Eure-et-Loir is a multi-day road cycling race that has been held annually in the Eure-et-Loir department of France since 1949. It was part of UCI Europe Tour as a category 2.2 event from 2019 to 2024, before returning to the national calendar in 2025.

== Winners ==
Year	Winner	Second	Third
1949	(France) Georges Roux	(France) P. Charbonnel	(France) M. Sandon
1950	(France) Roger Huet	(France) G. Gautier	(France) Valentin Gerussi
1951	(France) Raymond Komor	(France) Bernard Potet	(France) G. Lécuyer
1952	(France) G. Langlois	(France) Guyard	(France) H. Renard
1953	(France) Jean Hemmerle	(France) J. Cortinavis	(France) Gilbert Saulière
1954	(France) André Mézière	(France) Armand Finet	(France) Roger Bezamat
1955	(France) Raymond Komor	(France) Antoine Frankowski	(France) Paul Sighirdjian
1956	(France) Marcel Danguillaume	(France) André Vagner	(France) Duchannoy
1957	(France) Jean Danguillaume	(France) Fernand Lamy	(France) Raymond Guilbert
1958	(France) Raymond Guitay	(France) Carrara	(France) Jean Hoffmann
1959	(Spain) Henri Belena	(France) I. Chaipolin	(France) Jacques Collado
1960	(France) Gérard Bauman	(France) Alphonse Chiapolini	(France) Valentin Modric
1961	(Spain) José Maria Errandonea	(France) Lucien Wasilewski	(France) Eugène Huet
1962	(France) Francis Bazire	(France) Jack André	(France) Alain Vera
1963	(France) Francis Bazire	(Spain) José Maria Errandonea	(France) Jean-Pierre Magnien
1964	(France) Raymond Delisle	(France) Roger Milliot	(France) Francis Pamart
1965	(France) Jean-Pierre Livet	(United Kingdom) Colin Lewis	(France) Charly Grosskost
1966	(France) Jean Sadot	(France) Jacky Mourioux	(France) Pierre Croquison
1967	(France) Jean-Pierre Danguillaume	(France) Gérard Besnard	(France) Michel Lainé
1968	(France) Christian Boulnois	(France) Gérard Demont	(France) Jacky Mourioux
1969–1971	No race		
1972	(France) Michel Coroller	(France) Francis Quillon	(France) Richard Kindelberger
1973–1978	No race		
1979	(France) Jean-Paul Loris	(France) Jean-Paul Romion	(France) Joël Mouquet
1980	(France) Guy Gallopin	(France) Patrick Derosier	(France) Jean-Paul Romion
1981	(France) Claude Marciaux	(France) Philippe Pesenti	(France) Jean-Luc Hamon
1982	(France) Berto Vaccari	(France) Yvan Frebert	(France) Thierry Claveyrolat
1983	(France) Jacky Buron	(France) Florent Maugé	(France) Patrick Lucas
1984	(France) Bernard Richard	(France) Patrick Pommeret	(France) Thierry Le Rall
1985	(France) Laurent Bezault	(France) Jean-François Morio	(France) Philippe Brenner
1986	(France) Jean-François Morio	(France) Jean-Pierre Duracka	(France) Claude Cherod
1987	(France) Laurent Bezault	(France) Jean-François Morio	(France) Pascal Lino
1988	(France) Fabrice Henry	(France) Christophe Paulve	(France) Philippe Pitrou
1989	(France) Marc Peronin	(France) Laurent Brochard	(France) Yvon Ledanois
1990	(France) Fabrice Henry	(France) F. Prudhomme	(France) Jean-Michel Audren
1991	(France) Hervé Boussard	(France) Olivier Peyrieras	(France) Cédric Vasseur
1992	(France) Valère Fillon	(France) Fabrice Henry	(France) Jean-Michel Monin
1993–2001	No race		
2002	(France) Rony Martias	(France) Arnaud Coyot	(France) Yohann Gène
2003	(France) Anthony Ravard	(France) Alexandre Naulleau	(France) Romain Feillu
2004	(France) Mathieu Claude	(France) Sébastien Minard	(France) Antoine Dalibard
2005	(France) Romain Feillu	(France) Julien Belgy	(France) Benoît Sinner
2006	(France) Benoît Daeninck	(France) Guillaume Le Floch	(Estonia) Rein Taaramäe
2007	(France) Maxime Bouet	(France) Arnold Jeannesson	(France) Raphaël Lesage
2008	(New Zealand) Alex Meenhorst	(France) Fabien Taillefer	(France) Pierre-Luc Périchon
2009	(France) Mathieu Halleguen	(France) Armindo Fonseca	(France) Thomas Girard
2010	(France) Thomas Vaubourzeix	(Lithuania) Ramūnas Navardauskas	(France) Emmanuel Kéo
2011	(France) Mathieu Cloarec	(France) Emmanuel Kéo	(France) Mathieu Le Lavandier
2012	(Australia) Samuel Spokes	(France) Benoît Poitevin	(Belgium) Thomas Sprengers
2013	(France) Benoît Poitevin	(France) Marc Fournier	(France) Romain Cardis
2014	(France) Benoît Sinner	(France) Jérémy Cornu	(France) Bruno Armirail
2015	(France) Romain Cardis	(France) Thomas Rostollan	(France) Benoît Cosnefroy
2016	(France) Paul Ourselin	(France) Fabien Doubey	(France) Aurélien Paret-Peintre
2017–2018	No race		
2019	(Netherlands) Luuc Bugter	(France) Maxime Urruty	(France) Sébastien Havot
2020	No race due to the COVID-19 pandemic		
2021	(France) Paul Penhoët	(Germany) Kim Heiduk	(France) Maxime Jarnet
2022	(France) Samuel Leroux	(France) Valentin Tabellion	(France) Emilien Jeannière
2023	(France) Noa Isidore	(Belgium) Jasper Dejaegher	(France) Valentin Tabellion
2024	(France) Antoine L'Hote	(France) Théo Delacroix	(France) Joris Delbove
2025	(France) Paul Picard	(France) Baptiste Gillet	(France) Edgard Berthelemy
