= Tony Hurel =

French cyclist

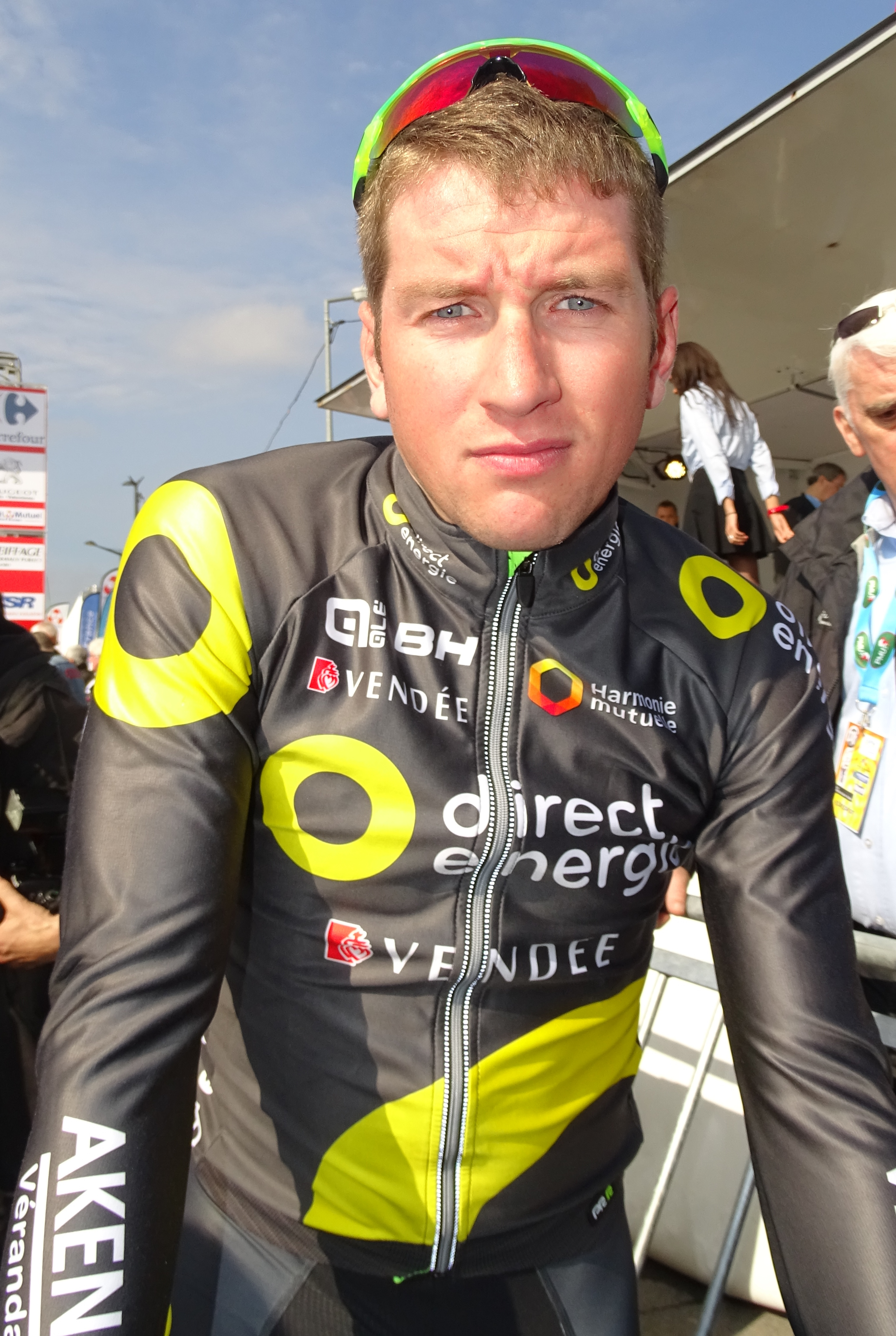
- Hurel at the 2016 Grand Prix de Denain

Personal information
- Full name: Tony Hurel
- Born: 1 November 1987 (age 39) Lisieux, France

Cycling career
- Sport: Cycling
- Current team: St. Michel–Preference Home–Auber93
- Disciplines: Road; Cyclo-cross
- Role: Rider

Amateur teams
- 2005: Comité Sarthe (junior)
- 2006–2007: CA Mantes
- 2007: SFAC
- 2008–2010: Vendée U
- 2009: Bbox Bouygues Telecom (stagiaire)
- 2010–2019: VS Saint-Michel Charles Christ (cyclo-cross)
- 2010: Bbox Bouygues Telecom (stagiaire)
- 2018: Sojasun espoir–ACNC

Professional teams
- 2011–2017: Team Europcar
- 2019–: St. Michel–Auber93

Tony Hurel (born 1 November 1987) is a French professional road and cyclo-cross racer, who currently rides for UCI Continental team St. Michel–Preference Home–Auber93.

== Career ==
Born in Lisieux, Hurel competed as a professional from the start of the 2011 season, joining Team Europcar full-time after two stagiaire contracts with the team, then known as Bbox Bouygues Telecom in the second half of 2009 and 2010 respectively. In July 2012, Hurel took his first victory for the team, by winning the Polynormande race in France, in a bunch sprint. He was named in the start list for the 2015 Vuelta a España. He returned to the amateur ranks after the 2017 season, signing a deal with Sojasun espoir–ACNC.

== Major results ==
2005
1st Overall Ronde des Vallées
1st Overall Circuito Cántabro
2007
1st Stage 6 Tour de la Nouvelle-Caledonie
2008
1st Overall Vuelta a la Comunidad de Madrid sub-23
2nd Prix Gilbert Bousquet
2009
1st Trophée des Champions
1st Circuit de la Vallée de la Loire
2nd Overall Saint Brieuc Agglo-Tour
2nd Tour du Perigord
4th Overall Tour de Martinique

1st Stage 8b (ITT)

6th Paris–Tours Espoirs
2010
1st Overall Circuit des Plages Vendéennes

1st Stage 4

1st Paris–Conneré
1st Grand Prix SADE
1st Stage 3 Tour de la Manche
2nd Paris–Chambord–Vailly
8th Overall Boucles de la Mayenne
2011
1st Cyclo-cross de Dollon Chpt 72
1st Cyclo-cross de Bretoncelles
7th La Roue Tourangelle
2012
1st Polynormande
3rd Cyclo cross de Deauville
10th Tro-Bro Léon
2013
4th Overall Arctic Race of Norway
7th Overall Tour de Normandie
2014
9th Trofeo Ses Salines
10th Tour de Vendée
2016
6th Polynormande
10th Le Samyn
2017
1st Stage 2 La Tropicale Amissa Bongo
2018
1st Stage 3 Tour de Bretagne
4th Overall Tour du Loir-et-Cher

1st Stage 3

7th Overall Circuit des Ardennes
2019
2nd Paris–Troyes
9th Overall Ronde de l'Oise

=== Grand Tour general classification results timeline ===
Grand Tour	2014	2015	2016
Giro d'Italia	134	—	—
Tour de France	—	—	—
Vuelta a España	—	145	DNF

Legend
—	Did not compete
DNF	Did not finish
