= Damien Gaudin =

French road bicycle racer

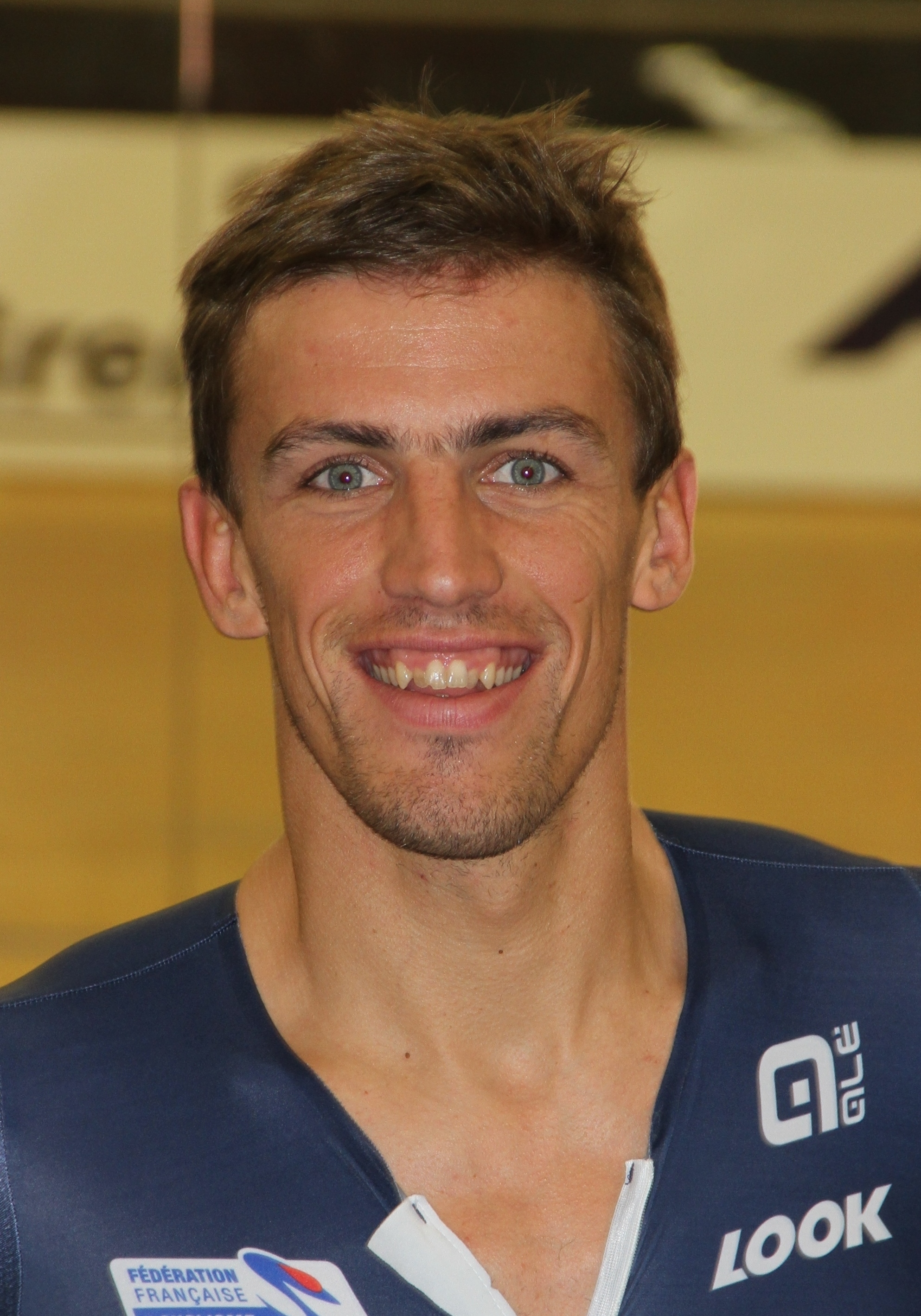
- Gaudin at the 2015 UEC European Track Championships

Personal information
- Full name: Damien Gaudin
- Born: 20 August 1986 (age 40) Beaupréau, France
- Height: 1.90 m (6 ft 3 in)
- Weight: 79 kg (174 lb; 12 st 6 lb)

Cycling career
- Sport: Cycling
- Current team: Retired
- Disciplines: Road; Track
- Role: Rider
- Rider type: Time trialist; Classics specialist

Amateur team
- 2005–2007: Vendée U

Professional teams
- 2008–2013: Bouygues Télécom
- 2014–2016: Ag2r–La Mondiale
- 2017: Armée de Terre
- 2018–2021: Direct Énergie

Damien Gaudin (born 20 August 1986) is a French former road bicycle racer, who competed as a professional from 2008 to 2021 for the AG2R La Mondiale, Armée de Terre and Team Europcar/Team TotalEnergies squads.

During his professional career, Gaudin took six victories – the 2013 Cholet-Pays de Loire and 2017 Tro-Bro Léon one-day races, and four prologue time trials between 2013 and 2018. He also won five national titles at the French National Track Championships, competed in the team pursuit for France at the 2008 Summer Olympics, and won two daily combativity awards in the 2018 Tour de France.

== Major results ==
2003
1st Chrono des Nations Juniors
2004
3rd Chrono des Nations Juniors
2006
1st Madison, National Track Championships (with Thibaut Mace)
National Under-23 Track Championships

1st Individual pursuit
1st Points race

2007
National Under-23 Track Championships

1st Individual pursuit
2nd Team pursuit

1st Paris–Roubaix Espoirs
2nd Madison, National Track Championships (with Thibaut Mace)
2nd Overall Tour du Haut-Anjou
9th Overall Ronde de l'Oise
2008
1st Madison, National Track Championships (with Sébastien Turgot)
2009
National Track Championships

1st Individual pursuit
2nd Madison (with Jérôme Cousin)

2010
National Track Championships

1st Individual pursuit
1st Madison (with Benoît Daeninck)

2011
4th Overall Danmark Rundt
6th Overall Tour du Poitou-Charentes
2012
5th Overall Danmark Rundt
5th Duo Normand (with Sébastien Turgot)
8th Grote Prijs Jef Scherens
2013
1st Cholet-Pays de Loire
1st Prologue Paris–Nice
5th Paris–Roubaix
2015
4th Grand Prix de la Somme
5th Overall Four Days of Dunkirk
2016
7th Overall Four Days of Dunkirk
2017
1st Tro-Bro Léon
1st Stage 6 Tour de Normandie
1st Stage 4 Tour de Bretagne
1st Prologue Tour de Luxembourg
1st Prologue Volta a Portugal
9th Overall Tour du Poitou-Charentes
2018
1st Prologue Tour de Luxembourg
2nd Tro-Bro Léon
3rd Overall La Tropicale Amissa Bongo
3rd Le Samyn
Tour de France

Combativity award Stages 6 & 9

2019
9th Overall Tour Poitou-Charentes en Nouvelle-Aquitaine
2020
8th Overall La Tropicale Amissa Bongo
2021
2nd Nokere Koerse

=== Grand Tour general classification results timeline ===
Grand Tour	2009	2010	2011	2012	2013	2014	2015	2016	2017	2018
Giro d'Italia	—	136	—	—	—	—	—	—	—	—
Tour de France	—	—	—	—	—	—	146	—	—	140
Vuelta a España	139	—	—	—	—	132	—	—	—	—

Legend
—	Did not compete
DNF	Did not finish
