= Mathieu Claude =

French cyclist

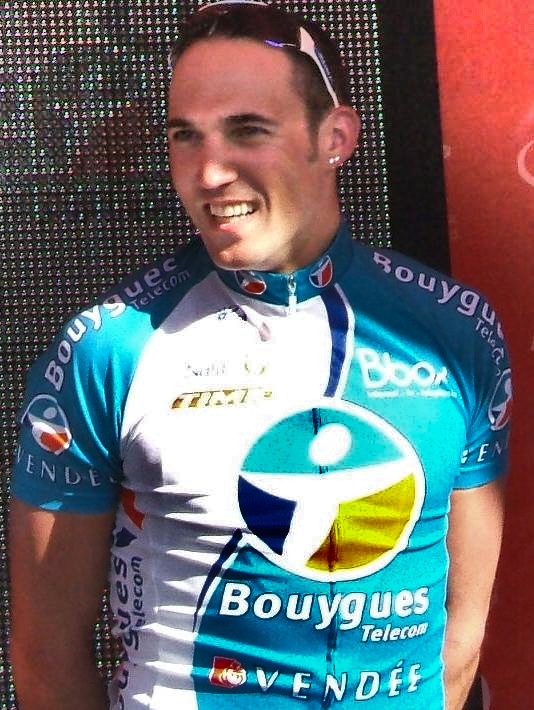

Personal information
- Full name: Mathieu Claude
- Born: 17 March 1983 (age 43) Niort, France
- Height: 1.80 m (5 ft 11 in)
- Weight: 69 kg (152 lb)

Cycling career
- Sport: Cycling
- Current team: Retired
- Discipline: Road
- Role: Rider

Amateur team
- 2002–2004: Vendée U

Professional team
- 2005–2012: Bouygues Télécom

Mathieu Claude (born 17 March 1983) is a French former professional road bicycle racer, who competed professionally between 2005 and 2012, entirely for the Bouygues Télécom squad which later became Team Europcar. He competed in the 2005 and 2010 Giro d'Italia and the 2006 and 2007 Vuelta a España.

== Major results ==
2003
1st La Côte Picarde
1st Paris–Tours Espoirs
2004
1st Overall Tour d'Eure-et-Loir
1st Stage 3 Boucles de la Mayenne
6th Bordeaux–Saintes
2005
6th Grand Prix d'Isbergues
2006
7th Châteauroux Classic
9th Nokere Koerse
2007
6th Boucles de l'Aulne
2008
9th Overall Tour Ivoirien de la Paix
