= Crêches-sur-Saône =

- Commune
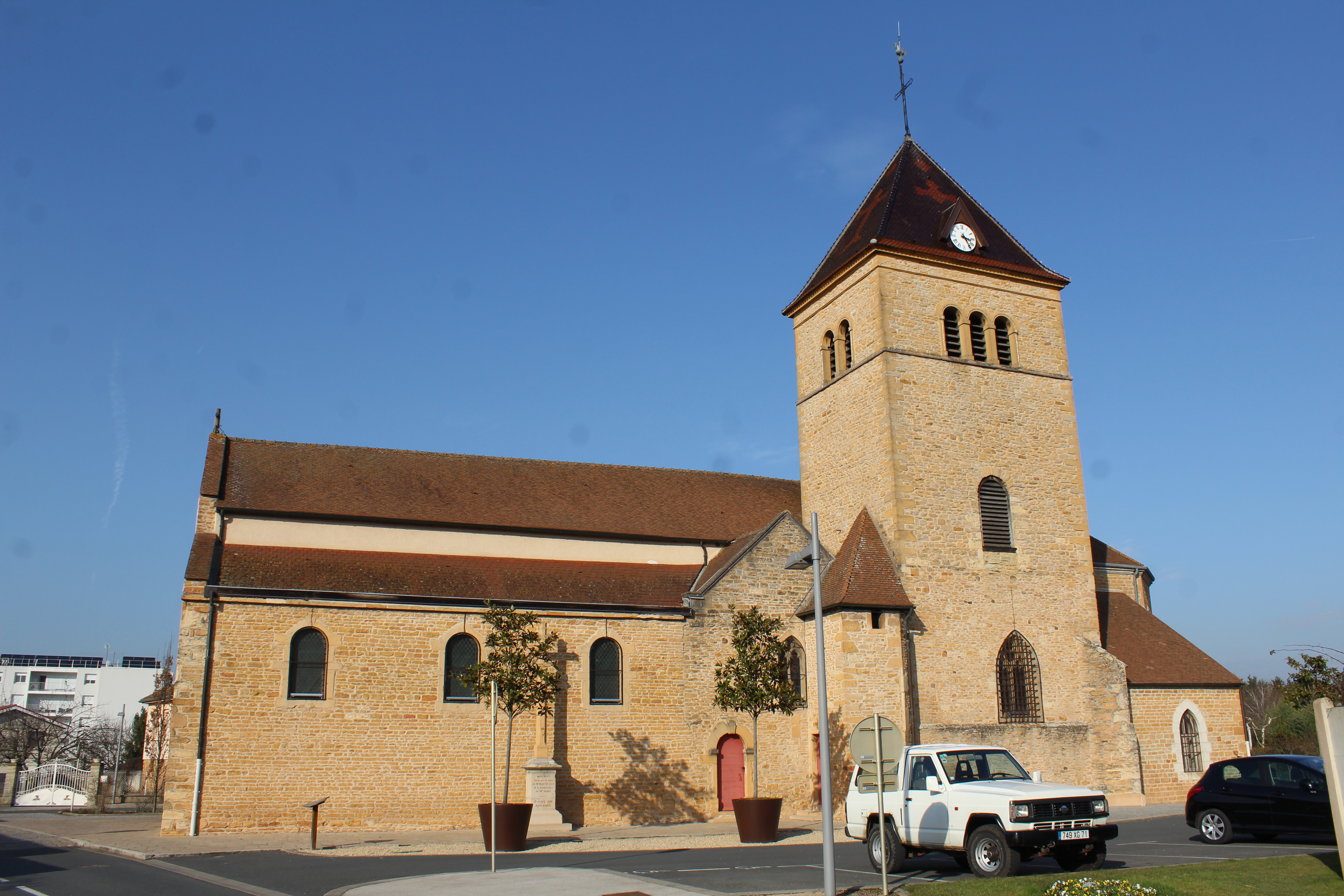
- The church in Crêches-sur-Saône

- Coat of arms
- Location of Crêches-sur-Saône
- Location within France Location within Bourgogne-Franche-Comté
- Coordinates: 46°14′51″N 4°47′14″E
- Country: France
- Region: Bourgogne-Franche-Comté
- Department: Saône-et-Loire
- Arrondissement: Mâcon
- Canton: La Chapelle-de-Guinchay
- Intercommunality: Mâconnais Beaujolais Agglomération

Government
  - Mayor (2026–32): Valentin Carreras
- Area^{1}: 9.33 km^{2} (3.60 sq mi)
- Elevation: 183 m (600 ft)
- Highest elevation: 230 m (750 ft)
- Lowest elevation: 169 m (554 ft)
- Population (2023): 3,198
  - Density: 343/km^{2} (888/sq mi)
- Time zone: UTC+01:00 (CET)
  - Summer (DST): UTC+02:00 (CEST)
- INSEE/Postal code: 71150 /71680
- ^{1} French Land Register data, which excludes lakes, ponds, glaciers > 1 km^{2} (0.386 sq mi or 247 acres) and river estuaries.

Crêches-sur-Saône (French pronunciation: [kʁɛʃ syʁ son], literally Crêches on Saône) is a commune in the Saône-et-Loire department in the region of Bourgogne-Franche-Comté in eastern France.

== Population ==
Historical population
Year	Pop.	±% p.a.
1968	1,588	—
1975	2,169	+4.55%
1982	2,345	+1.12%
1990	2,531	+0.96%
1999	2,753	+0.94%
2007	2,826	+0.33%
2012	2,887	+0.43%
2017	2,986	+0.68%
2023	3,198	+1.15%
Source: INSEE

== See also ==
- Communes of the Saône-et-Loire department
