= Sébastien Turgot =

French cyclist

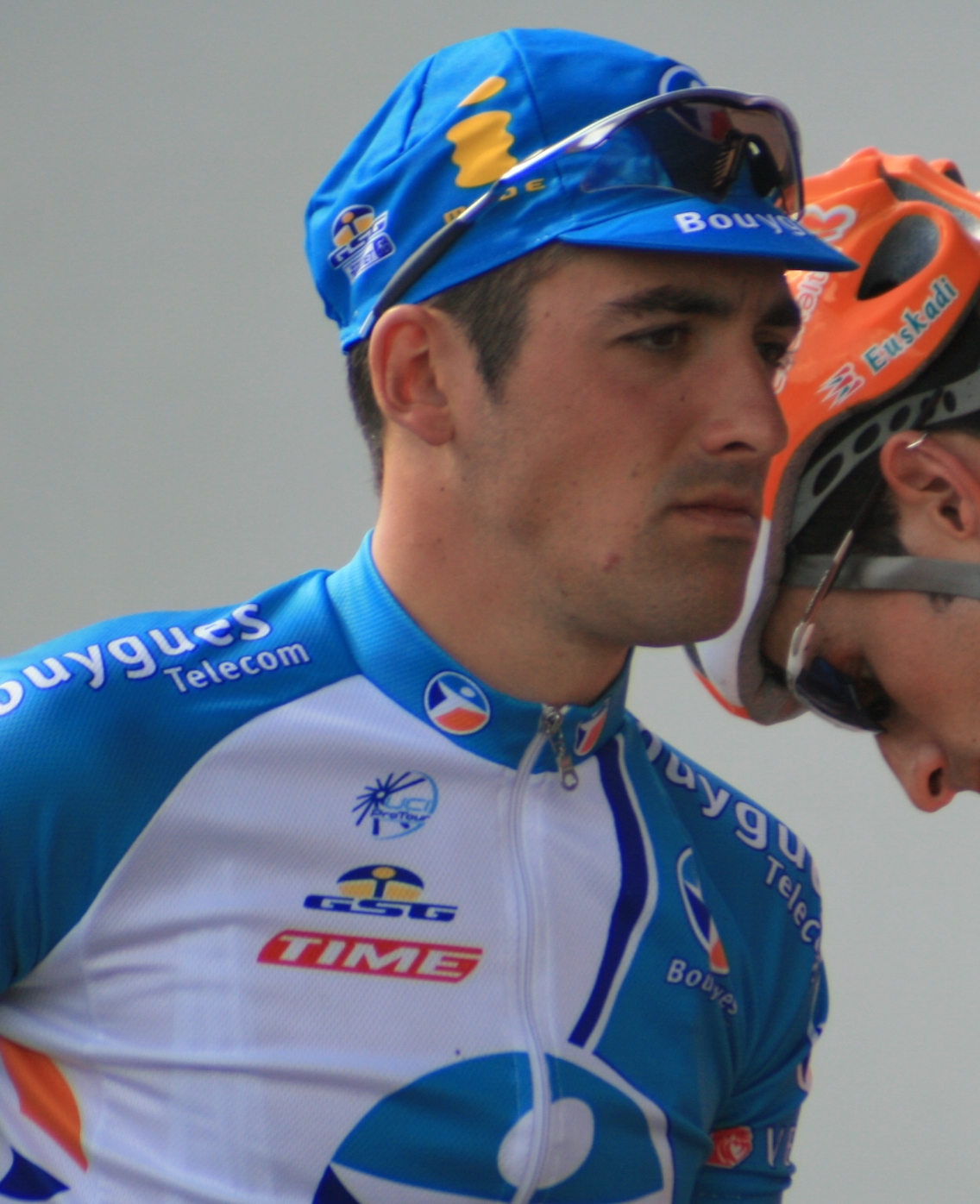
- Turgot at the 2008 Eneco Tour

Personal information
- Full name: Sébastien Turgot
- Born: 11 April 1984 (age 42) Limoges, France
- Height: 1.79 m (5 ft 10 in)
- Weight: 73 kg (161 lb; 11.5 st)

Cycling career
- Sport: Cycling
- Current team: Retired
- Discipline: Road
- Role: Rider

Amateur teams
- 2006: Bouygues Télécom (stagiaire)
- 2007: Vendée U
- 2017: US Saint-Herblain

Professional teams
- 2008–2013: Bouygues Télécom
- 2014–2016: Ag2r–La Mondiale

Sébastien Turgot (French: [sebastjɛ̃ tyʁɡo]; born 11 April 1984) is a French former professional road bicycle racer, who rode professionally between 2008 and 2016 for the Team Europcar and AG2R La Mondiale teams.

His biggest result came when he came in third in the 2008 Paris–Tours after leading in the last 100 metres, but was beaten by Philippe Gilbert of Française des Jeux and Jan Kuyckx of Landbouwkrediet–Tönissteiner. His third place was not expected by anybody but was a confirmation of his abilities, as demonstrated by his multiple French national track championship titles. In 2012, Turgot was runner-up in one of the most prestigious races of the cycling calendar, Paris–Roubaix.

== Major results ==
2006
6th La Côte Picarde
2007
1st Overall Les 3 Jours de Vaucluse

1st Young rider classification

8th Overall Tour de Bretagne

1st Stage 4

9th Overall Le Triptyque des Monts et Châteaux
2008
2nd Overall Tour Ivoirien de la Paix

1st Stage 2

3rd Paris–Tours
3rd Grand Prix de la Somme
6th Overall Tour du Poitou-Charentes
2010
7th Kuurne–Brussels–Kuurne
8th Overall Three Days of De Panne

1st Stage 2

8th Châteauroux Classic
2011
2nd Overall Boucles de la Mayenne

1st Prologue

10th Overall Danmark Rundt
2012
2nd Paris–Roubaix
4th Polynormande
5th Road race, National Road Championships
5th Duo Normand (with Damien Gaudin)
6th Overall Tour de Picardie
8th Scheldeprijs
10th Overall Three Days of De Panne
10th E3 Harelbeke
2013
8th Tour of Flanders
9th La Roue Tourangelle
10th E3 Harelbeke
10th Paris–Roubaix
2014
3rd Cholet-Pays de Loire
7th Tro-Bro Léon
2015
5th Grand Prix Pino Cerami
9th Overall Tour de Wallonie

=== Grand Tour general classification results timeline ===
Grand Tour	2010	2011	2012	2013	2014
Giro d'Italia	Did not contest during career				
Tour de France	113	120	—	—	—
Vuelta a España	—	—	—	—	154

Legend
—	Did not compete
DNF	Did not finish
