= Guillaume Le Floch =

French cyclist

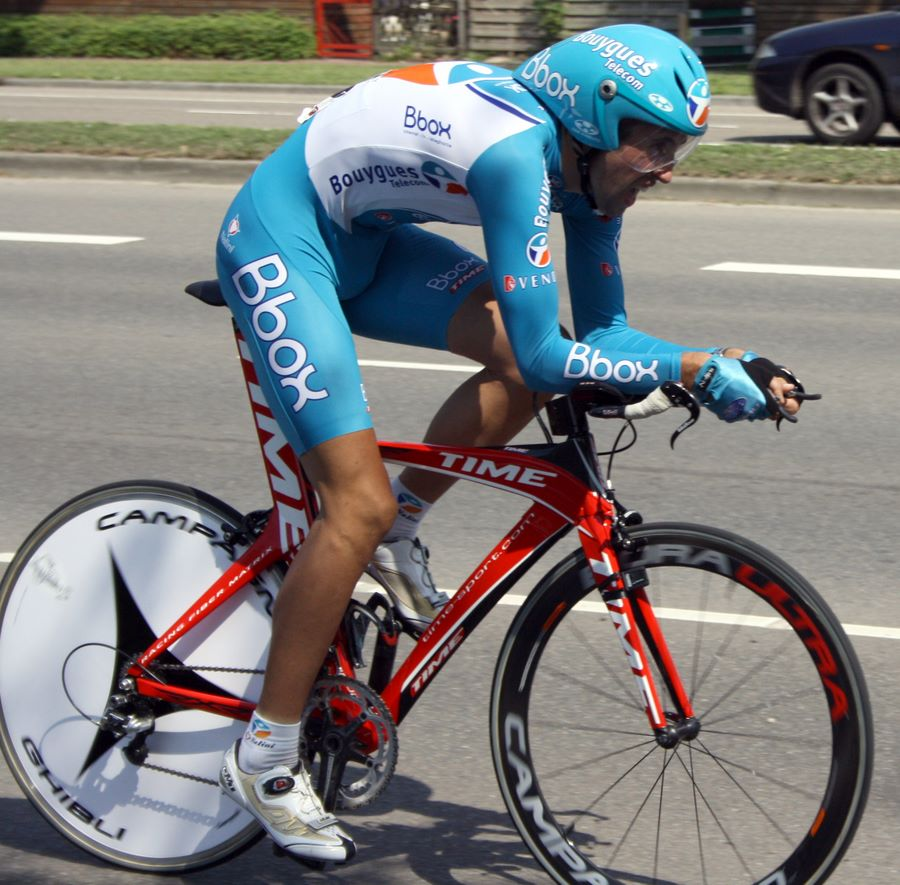

Personal information
- Full name: Guillaume Le Floch
- Born: 16 February 1985 (age 41) Saint-Brieuc, France

Cycling career
- Sport: Cycling
- Disciplines: Road, track
- Role: Rider
- Rider type: Rouleur

Amateur teams
- 2004–2006: Super Sport 35–ACNC
- 2012: Côtes d'Armor–Marie Morin
- 2013: VC Quintin

Professional teams
- 2007–2008: Bretagne–Armor Lux
- 2009–2011: Bbox Bouygues Telecom

Guillaume Le Floch (born 16 February 1985 in Saint-Brieuc) is a French athlete. Prior to this, he was a road bicycle racer, who competed professionally between 2007 and 2011 for the Bretagne–Armor Lux and Team Europcar squads.

== Palmares ==
2005
1st, stage 2a, Kreiz Breizh

2006
2nd, French national road race championship (U23)
2nd, GP Plouay (U23)

2007
1st, Circuit de Morbihan
