= Anthony Charteau =

French cyclist

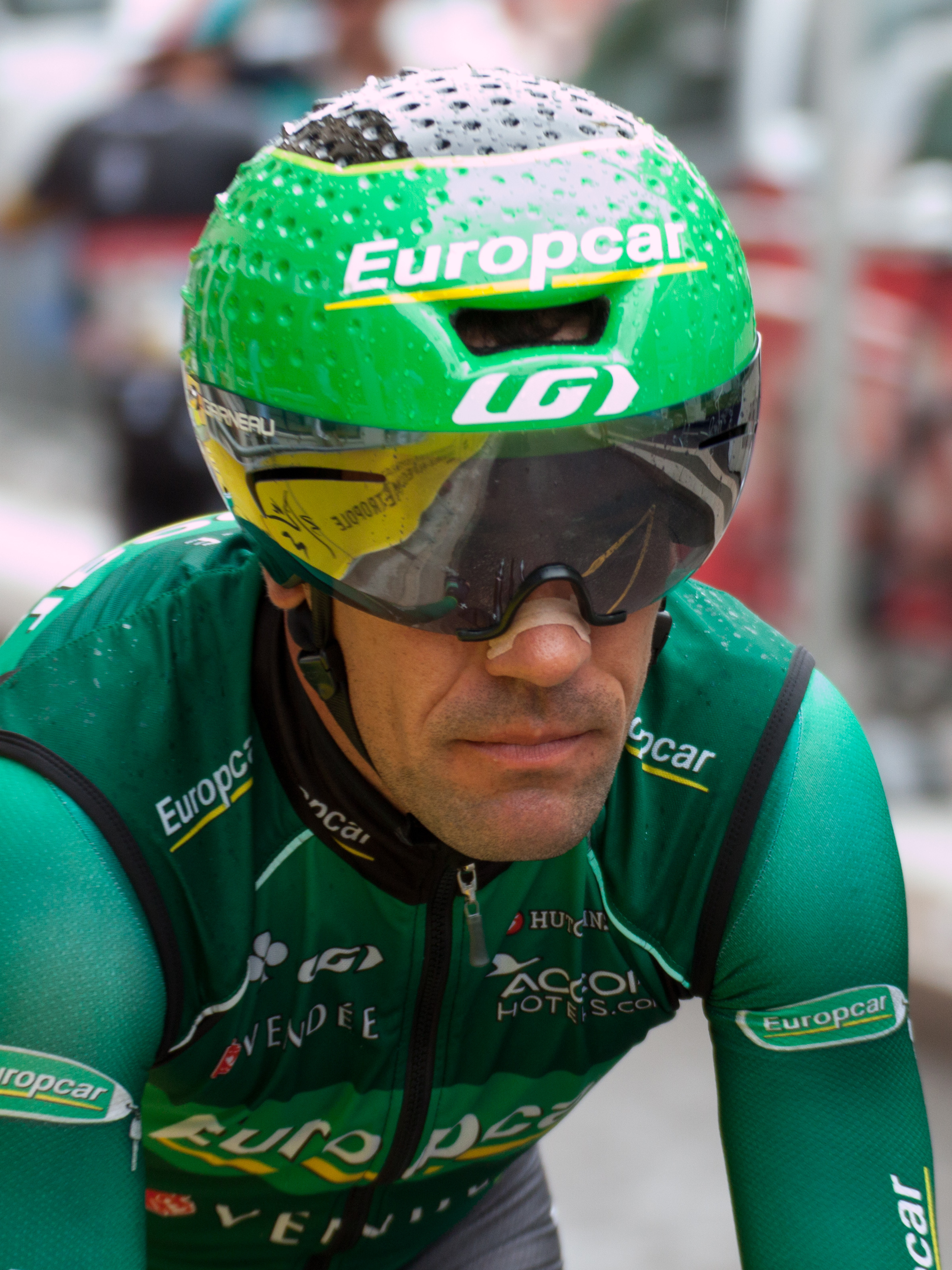
- Charteau at the 2012 Critérium du Dauphiné

Personal information
- Full name: Anthony Charteau
- Born: 4 June 1979 (age 47) Nantes, France
- Height: 1.75 m (5 ft 9 in)
- Weight: 67 kg (148 lb)

Cycling career
- Sport: Cycling
- Discipline: Road
- Role: Rider
- Rider type: Break away specialists/Climber

Professional teams
- 2001–2005: Bonjour
- 2006–2007: Crédit Agricole
- 2008–2009: Caisse d'Epargne
- 2010–2013: Bbox Bouygues Telecom

Major wins
- Grand Tours Tour de France Mountains classification (2010) Stage races Tour de Langkawi (2007)

Anthony Charteau (born 4 June 1979 in Nantes) is a French former professional road bicycle racer, who competed as a professional between 2001 and 2013. His biggest career victory was winning the Mountains classification in the Tour de France in the 2010 edition, which was his major breakthrough. He also won the Tropicale Amissa Bongo stage race in Gabon for three years in a row from 2010 to 2012.

Charteau retired at the end of the 2013 season, after thirteen seasons as a professional.

== Major results ==
2003
2nd Classic Loire Atlantique
4th Tour du Doubs
2004
6th Overall Route du Sud
2005
1st Stage 6 Volta a Catalunya
4th Tour du Finistère
9th International Grand Prix Doha
2006
1st Polynormande
2nd Grand Prix de Plumelec-Morbihan
2007
1st Overall Tour de Langkawi

1st Stage 3

2nd Paris–Camembert
3rd Overall Tour du Limousin
4th Trophée des Grimpeurs
9th Tour du Finistère
2008
3rd Paris–Bourges
2010
1st Overall La Tropicale Amissa Bongo

1st Stage 4

1st Mountains classification, Tour de France
9th Tour du Finistère
2011
1st Overall La Tropicale Amissa Bongo
3rd Boucles de l'Aulne
6th Tour de Vendée
10th Overall Route du Sud

1st Stage 2

2012
1st Overall La Tropicale Amissa Bongo
3rd Overall Route du Sud
7th Paris–Camembert
2013
1st Stage 4 Tour de Normandie
9th Overall Rhône-Alpes Isère Tour
