= Belleville, Rhône =

Belleville
- Part of Belleville-en-Beaujolais
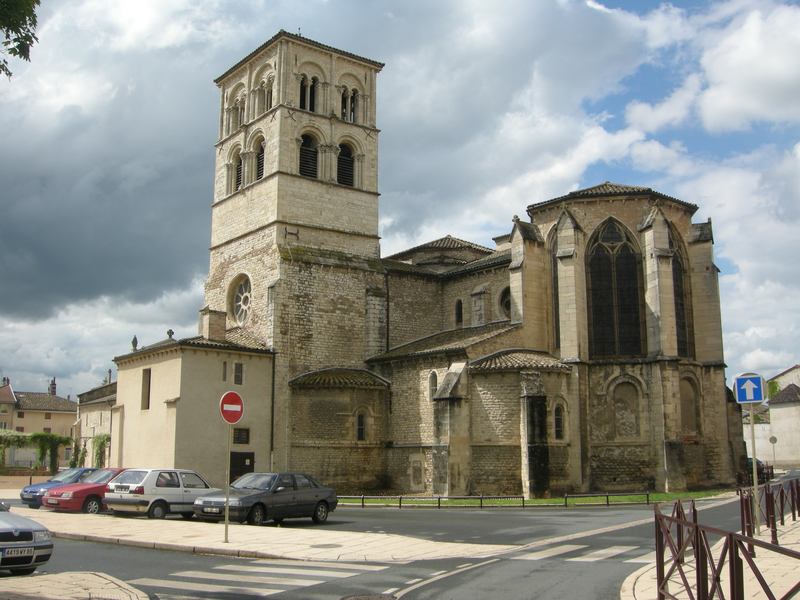
- The church of Our Lady, in Belleville

- Coat of arms
- Location of Belleville
- Location within France Location within Auvergne-Rhône-Alpes
- Coordinates: 46°06′34″N 4°45′00″E
- Country: France
- Region: Auvergne-Rhône-Alpes
- Department: Rhône
- Arrondissement: Villefranche-sur-Saône
- Canton: Belleville
- Commune: Belleville-en-Beaujolais
- Area^{1}: 10.42 km^{2} (4.02 sq mi)
- Elevation: 191 m (627 ft)
- Highest elevation: 225 m (738 ft)
- Lowest elevation: 169 m (554 ft)
- Population (2022): 8,695
  - Density: 834.5/km^{2} (2,161/sq mi)
- Time zone: UTC+01:00 (CET)
  - Summer (DST): UTC+02:00 (CEST)
- Postal code: 69220
- ^{1} French Land Register data, which excludes lakes, ponds, glaciers > 1 km^{2} (0.386 sq mi or 247 acres) and river estuaries.

Belleville (French pronunciation: [bɛlvil]) is a former commune of the Rhône department in eastern France. On 1 January 2019, it was merged into the new commune Belleville-en-Beaujolais.

== See also ==
Communes of the Rhône department
