= Anthony Ravard =

French cyclist

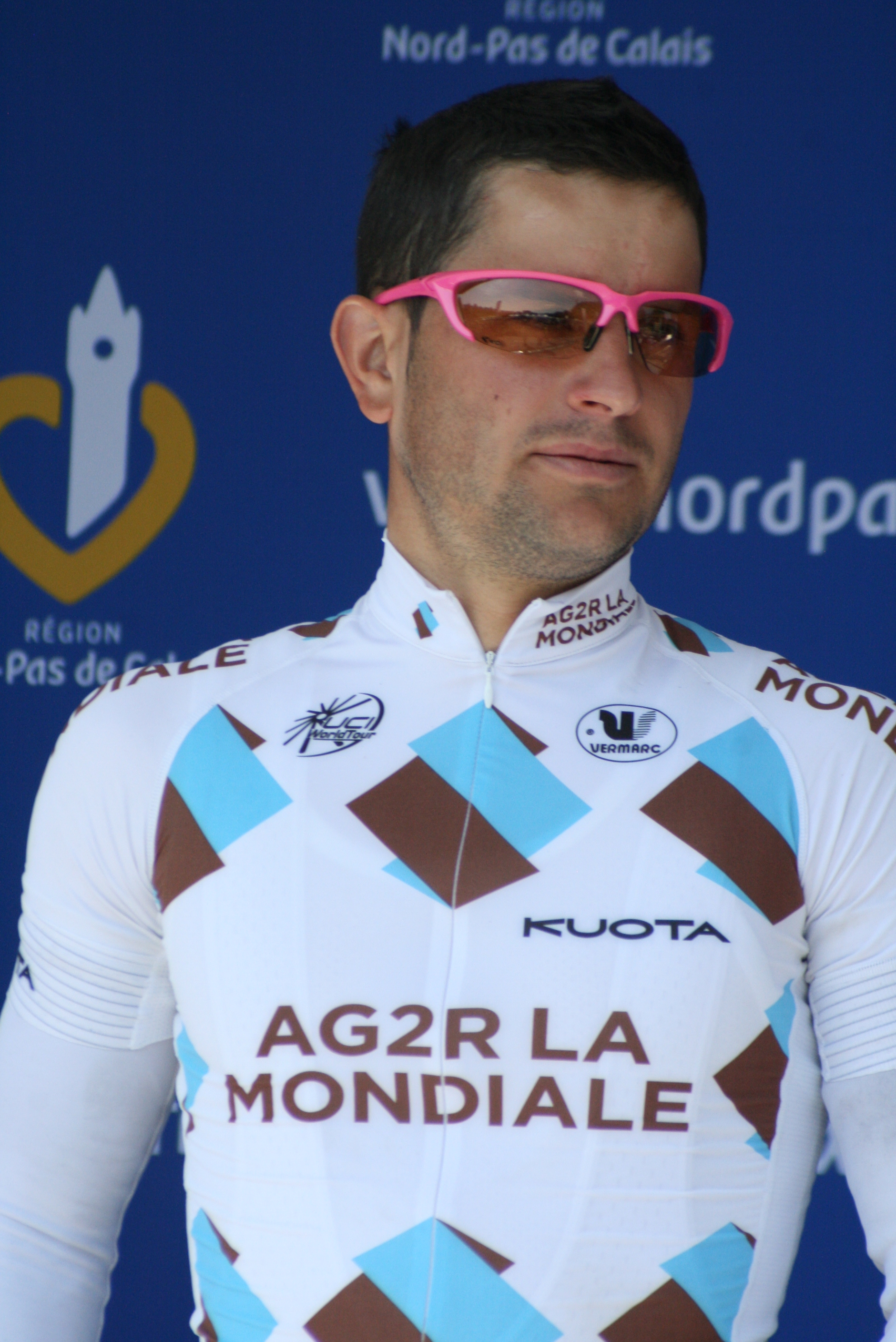
- Ravard at the 2011 Four Days of Dunkirk

Personal information
- Full name: Anthony Ravard
- Born: 28 September 1983 (age 43) Nantes, France

Cycling career
- Sport: Cycling
- Discipline: Road
- Role: Rider
- Rider type: Sprinter

Professional teams
- 2005–2006: Bouygues Télécom
- 2007–2009: Agritubel
- 2010–2013: Ag2r–La Mondiale

Anthony Ravard (born 28 September 1983) is a French former road bicycle racer, who competed as a professional between 2005 and 2013. Ravard competed professionally for UCI Pro Tour team Ag2r–La Mondiale, as well as the Bouygues Télécom and Agritubel squads.

== Major results ==
2004
1st Stage 3 Ruban Granitier Breton
1st Stage 2 Boucles de la Mayenne
6th La Côte Picarde
2005
1st Stage 1 Circuit de la Sarthe
4th GP de Fourmies
2006
9th GP de la Ville de Rennes
10th Nokere Koerse
2008
Tour de Normandie
1st Stages 2, 3 & 4
1st Stage 1 Circuit de la Sarthe
1st, Châteauroux Classic
2nd Boucles du Sud Ardèche
4th Classic Loire Atlantique
4th Paris–Camembert
7th Memorial Samyn
2009
1st Stage 1 Tour du Poitou-Charentes
2nd Grand Prix de la Somme
3rd Châteauroux Classic
4th Boucles du Sud Ardèche
2010
Circuit de la Sarthe

1st Points classification
1st Stages 2a & 4

1st Stage 2 Tour du Poitou-Charentes
1st Châteauroux Classic
1st Paris–Bourges
3rd Grand Prix de la Somme
4th Memorial Rik Van Steenbergen
9th Route Adélie
2011
1st Overall Étoile de Bessèges

1st Points classification

1st Stage 3 Tour du Poitou-Charentes
1st Châteauroux Classic
3rd Paris–Brussels
7th Kuurne–Brussels–Kuurne
7th Grand Prix of Aargau Canton
7th Paris–Bourges
8th Grand Prix d'Isbergues
2012
4th Le Samyn

Grand Tour general classification results timeline

Grand Tour	2010	2011	2012	2013
Giro d'Italia	DNF	—	—	—
Tour de France	—	—	—	—
Vuelta a España	—	—	—	—

Legend
—	Did not compete
DNF	Did not finish
