= Jérôme Cousin =

French road bicycle racer

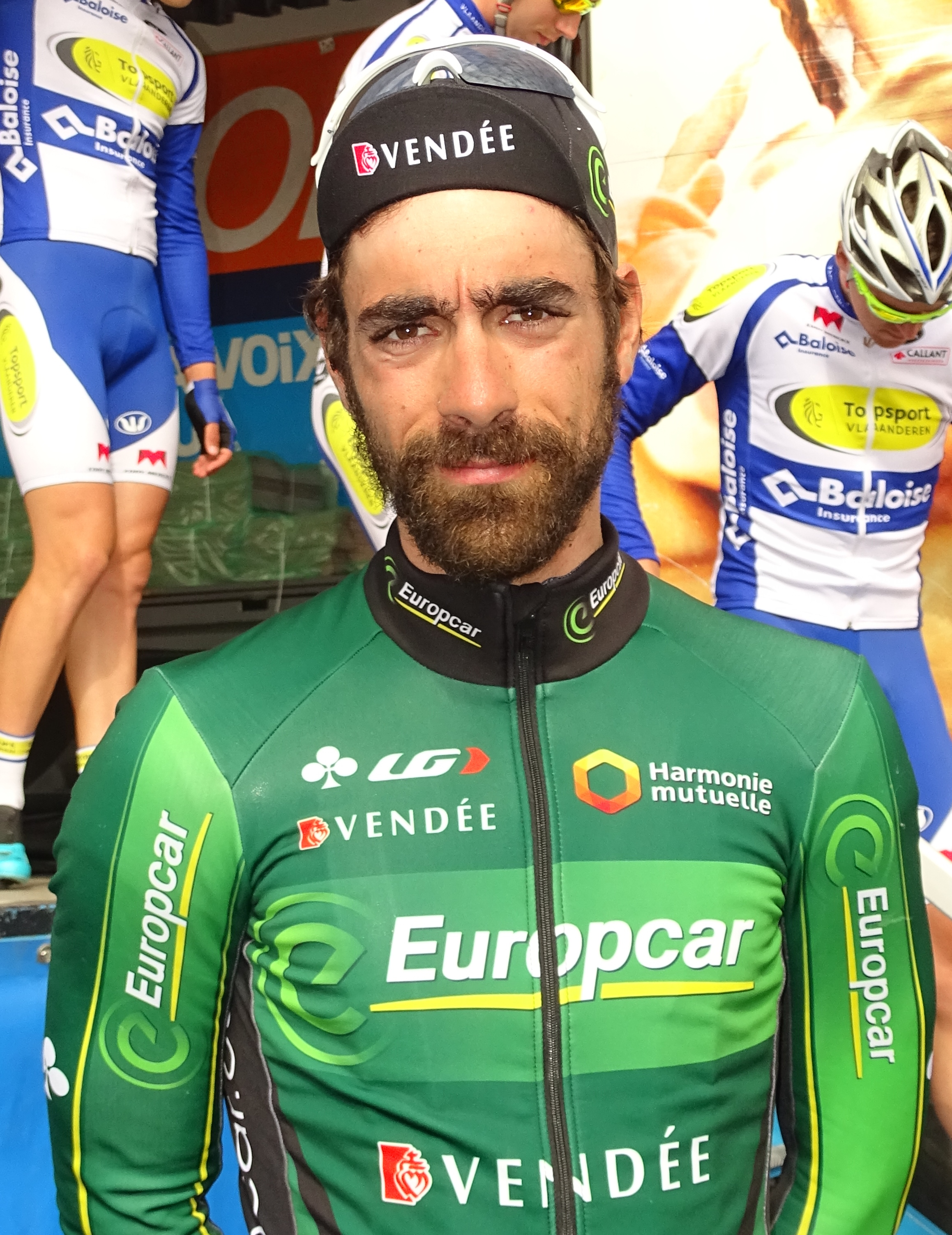
- Cousin in 2015.

Personal information
- Full name: Jérôme Cousin
- Born: 5 June 1989 (age 37) Saint-Sébastien-sur-Loire, Pays de la Loire, France
- Height: 1.80 m (5 ft 11 in)
- Weight: 74 kg (163 lb; 11 st 9 lb)

Cycling career
- Sport: Cycling
- Current team: Team TotalEnergies
- Discipline: Road
- Role: Rider
- Rider type: All-rounder

Amateur teams
- 2007: Team UC Nantes Atlantique junior
- 2008–2010: Vendée U
- 2009: Bbox Bouygues Telecom (stagiaire)
- 2010: Bbox Bouygues Telecom (stagiaire)

Professional teams
- 2011–2015: Team Europcar
- 2016–2017: Cofidis
- 2018–: Direct Énergie

Jérôme Cousin (born 5 June 1989) is a French professional road racing cyclist, who currently rides for UCI ProTeam Team TotalEnergies.

In October 2015 Cofidis announced that Cousin would join them from 2016 on a two-year contract, after six years with Team Europcar and its previous iterations. He returned to the team in 2018, now known as Direct Énergie, upon the expiration of his contract.

== Major results ==
2006
5th Chrono des Nations Juniors
2008
3rd Overall Tour du Haut-Anjou
9th Chrono des Nations Espoirs
2010
8th Overall Ronde de l'Isard

1st Stage 1

10th Overall Thüringen Rundfahrt der U23
2011
7th Overall Danmark Rundt
9th Polynormande
2012
1st Overall Tour de Normandie

1st Stage 2

Rhône-Alpes Isère Tour

1st Points classification
1st Stage 3

2013
2nd Overall Étoile de Bessèges

1st Young rider classification
1st Stage 3

Tour de France

Combativity award Stages 1 & 10

2018
1st Stage 5 Paris–Nice
Combativity award Stage 4 Tour de France
2019
3rd Overall Vuelta a Castilla y León
7th Paris–Camembert
2020
Combativity award Stage 3 Tour de France

=== Grand Tour general classification results timeline ===
Grand Tour	2013	2014	2015	2016	2017	2018	2019	2020
Giro d'Italia	Has not contested during his career							
Tour de France	156	—	—	121	—	93	—	HD
Vuelta a España	—	78	73	129	—	—	—	—

Legend
—	Did not compete
DNF	Did not finish
HD	Finished a stage outside the time limit resulting in them being eliminated.
