= La Tropicale Amissa Bongo =

Gabonese multi-day road cycling race

Race details
- Date: Late January
- Region: Gabon
- Discipline: Road
- Competition: UCI Africa Tour
- Type: Stage race
- Web site: www.tropicaleamissabongo.com/en/

History
- First edition: 2006
- Editions: 16 (as of 2023)
- First winner: Jussi Veikkanen (FIN)
- Most wins: Anthony Charteau (FRA) (3 wins)
- Most recent: Geoffrey Soupe (FRA)

La Tropicale Amissa Bongo is a road cycling race held in Gabon, as a 2.1 category event on the UCI Africa Tour. The race consists of only a men's competition, a race run over seven stages. The race is named in honor of Albertine Amissa Bongo.

== Past winners ==
Year	Country	Rider	Team
2006	Finland	Jussi Veikkanen	Française des Jeux
2007	France	Frédéric Guesdon	Française des Jeux
2008	France	Lilian Jégou	Française des Jeux
2009	France	Matthieu Ladagnous	Française des Jeux
2010	France	Anthony Charteau	Bbox Bouygues Telecom
2011	France	Anthony Charteau	Team Europcar
2012	France	Anthony Charteau	Team Europcar
2013	France	Yohann Gène	Team Europcar
2014	Eritrea	Natnael Berhane	Team Europcar
2015	Tunisia	Rafaâ Chtioui	Skydive Dubai–Al Ahli
2016	France	Adrien Petit	Direct Énergie
2017	France	Yohann Gène	Direct Énergie
2018	Rwanda	Joseph Areruya	Rwanda (national team)
2019	Italy	Niccolò Bonifazio	Direct Énergie
2020	France	Jordan Levasseur	Natura4Ever–Roubaix–Lille Métropole
2021–2022	No race		
2023	France	Geoffrey Soupe	Team TotalEnergies
