= List of 2014 UCI ProTeams and riders =

This page is a list of 2014 UCI ProTeams and riders. These teams competed in the 2014 UCI World Tour.

== Teams overview ==
The 18 ProTeams in 2014 were:

Code	Official team name	Licence holder	Country	Groupset	Bicycles
ALM	Ag2r–La Mondiale (2014 season)	EUSRL France Cyclisme	France	Campagnolo	Focus
AST	Astana (2014 season)	Abacanto SA	Kazakhstan	Campagnolo	Specialized
BEL	Belkin Pro Cycling (2014 season)	Rabo Wielerploegen	Netherlands	Shimano	Bianchi
BMC	BMC Racing Team (2014 season)	Continuum Sports LLC	United States	Shimano	BMC
CAN	Cannondale (2014 season)	Brixia Sports	Italy	SRAM	Cannondale
EUC	Team Europcar (2014 season)	SA Vendée Cyclisme	France	Campagnolo	Colnago
FDJ	FDJ.fr (2014 season)	Société de Gestion de L'Echappée	France	Shimano	Lapierre
GIA	Giant–Shimano (2014 season)	SMS Cycling B.V.	Netherlands	Shimano	Giant
GRS	Garmin–Sharp (2014 season)	Slipstream Sports, LLC	United States	Shimano	Cervélo
KAT	Team Katusha (2014 season)	Katusha Management SA	Russia	Shimano	Canyon
LAM	Lampre–Merida (2014 season)	CGS Cycling Team AG	Italy	Shimano	Merida
LTB	Lotto–Belisol (2014 season)	Belgian Cycling Company sa	Belgium	Campagnolo	Ridley
MOV	Movistar Team (2014 season)	Abarca Sports S.L.	Spain	Campagnolo	Canyon
OGE	Orica–GreenEDGE (2014 season)	GreenEdge Cycling	Australia	Shimano	Scott
OPQ	Omega Pharma–Quick-Step (2014 season)	Esperanza bvba	Belgium	SRAM	Specialized
SKY	Team Sky (2014 season)	Tour Racing Limited	Great Britain	Shimano	Pinarello
TCS	Tinkoff–Saxo (2014 season)	Tinkoff Sport	Russia	SRAM	Specialized
TFR	Trek Factory Racing (2014 season)	Trek Bicycle Corporation	United States	Shimano	Trek

== Riders ==
=== Ag2r–La Mondiale ===
As of 1 January 2014.

Rider	Date of birth
Davide Appollonio (ITA)	2 June 1989 (aged 24)
Gediminas Bagdonas (LTU)	26 December 1985 (aged 28)
Romain Bardet (FRA)	9 November 1990 (aged 23)
Julien Bérard (FRA)	2 July 1987 (aged 26)
Carlos Betancur (COL)	13 October 1989 (aged 24)
Guillaume Bonnafond (FRA)	23 June 1987 (aged 26)
Maxime Bouet (FRA)	3 November 1986 (aged 27)
Steve Chainel (FRA)	6 September 1983 (aged 30)
Mikaël Cherel (FRA)	17 March 1986 (aged 27)
Maxime Daniel (FRA)	5 June 1991 (aged 22)
Axel Domont (FRA)	7 August 1990 (aged 23)
Samuel Dumoulin (FRA)	20 August 1980 (aged 33)
Hubert Dupont (FRA)	13 November 1980 (aged 33)
Ben Gastauer (LUX)	14 November 1987 (aged 26)
Damien Gaudin (FRA)	20 August 1986 (aged 27)

Rider	Date of birth
Alexis Gougeard (FRA)	5 March 1993 (aged 20)
Patrick Gretsch (GER)	7 April 1987 (aged 26)
Hugo Houle (CAN)	27 September 1990 (aged 23)
Yauheni Hutarovich (BLR)	29 November 1983 (aged 30)
Blel Kadri (FRA)	3 September 1986 (aged 27)
Julian Kern (GER)	28 December 1989 (aged 24)
Sébastien Minard (FRA)	12 June 1982 (aged 31)
Lloyd Mondory (FRA)	26 April 1982 (aged 31)
Matteo Montaguti (ITA)	6 January 1984 (aged 29)
Rinaldo Nocentini (ITA)	25 September 1977 (aged 36)
Jean-Christophe Péraud (FRA)	22 May 1977 (aged 36)
Domenico Pozzovivo (ITA)	30 November 1982 (aged 31)
Christophe Riblon (FRA)	17 January 1981 (aged 32)
Sébastien Turgot (FRA)	11 April 1984 (aged 29)
Alexis Vuillermoz (FRA)	1 June 1988 (aged 25)

=== Astana ===
As of 1 January 2014.

Rider	Date of birth
Valerio Agnoli (ITA)	6 January 1985 (aged 28)
Fabio Aru (ITA)	3 July 1990 (aged 23)
Borut Božič (SLO)	8 August 1980 (aged 33)
Janez Brajkovič (SLO)	18 December 1983 (aged 30)
Alexsandr Dyachenko (KAZ)	17 October 1983 (aged 30)
Daniil Fominykh (KAZ)	28 August 1991 (aged 22)
Jakob Fuglsang (DEN)	22 March 1985 (aged 28)
Enrico Gasparotto (ITA)	22 March 1982 (aged 31)
Francesco Gavazzi (ITA)	1 August 1984 (aged 29)
Dmitriy Gruzdev (KAZ)	13 March 1986 (aged 27)
Andrea Guardini (ITA)	12 June 1989 (aged 24)
Jacopo Guarnieri (ITA)	14 August 1987 (aged 26)
Andriy Hrivko (UKR)	7 August 1983 (aged 30)
Evan Huffman (USA)	7 January 1990 (aged 23)
Maxim Iglinsky (KAZ)	18 April 1981 (aged 32)

Rider	Date of birth
Valentin Iglinsky (KAZ)	12 May 1984 (aged 29)
Arman Kamyshev (KAZ)	14 March 1991 (aged 22)
Tanel Kangert (EST)	11 March 1987 (aged 26)
Fredrik Kessiakoff (SWE)	17 May 1980 (aged 33)
Mikel Landa (ESP)	13 December 1989 (aged 24)
Alexey Lutsenko (KAZ)	7 September 1992 (aged 21)
Dimitry Muravyev (KAZ)	2 November 1979 (aged 34)
Vincenzo Nibali (ITA)	14 November 1984 (aged 29)
Michele Scarponi (ITA)	25 September 1979 (aged 34)
Paolo Tiralongo (ITA)	8 July 1977 (aged 36)
Ruslan Tleubayev (KAZ)	7 March 1987 (aged 26)
Alessandro Vanotti (ITA)	16 September 1980 (aged 33)
Lieuwe Westra (NED)	11 September 1982 (aged 31)
Andrey Zeits (KAZ)	14 December 1986 (aged 27)

=== Belkin Pro Cycling ===
As of 4 March 2014.

Rider	Date of birth
Jack Bobridge (AUS)	13 July 1989 (aged 24)
Jetse Bol (NED)	8 September 1989 (aged 24)
Lars Boom (NED)	30 December 1985 (aged 28)
Theo Bos (NED)	22 August 1983 (aged 30)
Graeme Brown (AUS)	9 April 1979 (aged 34)
Stef Clement (NED)	24 September 1982 (aged 31)
Rick Flens (NED)	11 April 1983 (aged 30)
Juan Manuel Gárate (Note: Gárate left the team on 25 February.) (ESP)	24 April 1976 (aged 37)
Robert Gesink (NED)	31 May 1986 (aged 27)
Marc Goos (NED)	30 November 1990 (aged 23)
Jonathan Hivert (FRA)	23 March 1985 (aged 28)
Moreno Hofland (NED)	31 August 1991 (aged 22)
Martijn Keizer (Note: Keizer joined the team on 25 February, after leaving VeranClassic-Doltcini.) (NED)	25 March 1988 (aged 25)
Wilco Kelderman (NED)	25 March 1991 (aged 22)
Steven Kruijswijk (NED)	7 June 1987 (aged 26)

Rider	Date of birth
Tom Leezer (NED)	26 December 1985 (aged 28)
Barry Markus (NED)	17 July 1991 (aged 22)
Paul Martens (GER)	26 October 1983 (aged 30)
Bauke Mollema (NED)	26 November 1986 (aged 27)
Lars Petter Nordhaug (NOR)	14 May 1984 (aged 29)
Bram Tankink (NED)	3 December 1978 (aged 35)
David Tanner (AUS)	30 September 1984 (aged 29)
Laurens ten Dam (NED)	13 November 1980 (aged 33)
Maarten Tjallingii (NED)	5 November 1977 (aged 36)
Nick van der Lijke (NED)	23 September 1991 (aged 22)
Jos van Emden (NED)	27 June 1987 (aged 26)
Dennis van Winden (NED)	2 December 1987 (aged 26)
Sep Vanmarcke (BEL)	28 July 1988 (aged 25)
Robert Wagner (GER)	17 April 1983 (aged 30)
Maarten Wynants (BEL)	13 May 1982 (aged 31)

=== BMC Racing Team ===
As of August 3, 2014.

Rider	Date of birth
Darwin Atapuma (COL)	January 15, 1988 (aged 25)
Alessandro Ballan (Note: Ballan was fired by the team on January 17, following his two-year doping ban.) (ITA)	November 6, 1979 (aged 34)
Brent Bookwalter (USA)	February 16, 1984 (aged 29)
Marcus Burghardt (GER)	June 30, 1983 (aged 30)
Steve Cummings (GBR)	March 19, 1981 (aged 32)
Rohan Dennis (Note: Dennis joined the team on August 1.) (AUS)	May 28, 1990 (aged 23)
Silvan Dillier (SUI)	August 3, 1990 (aged 23)
Yannick Eijssen (BEL)	June 26, 1989 (aged 24)
Cadel Evans (AUS)	February 14, 1977 (aged 36)
Philippe Gilbert (BEL)	July 5, 1982 (aged 31)
Ben Hermans (BEL)	June 8, 1986 (aged 27)
Thor Hushovd (NOR)	January 18, 1978 (aged 35)
Martin Kohler (SUI)	July 17, 1985 (aged 28)
Sebastian Lander (DEN)	March 11, 1991 (aged 22)
Klaas Lodewyck (BEL)	March 24, 1988 (aged 25)

Rider	Date of birth
Amaël Moinard (FRA)	February 2, 1982 (aged 31)
Steve Morabito (SUI)	January 30, 1983 (aged 30)
Dominik Nerz (GER)	August 25, 1989 (aged 24)
Daniel Oss (ITA)	January 13, 1987 (aged 26)
Taylor Phinney (USA)	June 27, 1990 (aged 23)
Manuel Quinziato (ITA)	October 30, 1979 (aged 34)
Samuel Sánchez (Note: Sánchez joined the team on February 2.) (ESP)	February 5, 1978 (aged 35)
Michael Schär (SUI)	September 29, 1986 (aged 27)
Peter Stetina (USA)	August 8, 1987 (aged 26)
Greg Van Avermaet (BEL)	May 17, 1985 (aged 28)
Tejay van Garderen (USA)	August 12, 1988 (aged 25)
Peter Velits (SVK)	August 12, 1985 (aged 28)
Larry Warbasse (USA)	June 28, 1990 (aged 23)
Danilo Wyss (SUI)	August 26, 1985 (aged 28)
Rick Zabel (GER)	December 7, 1993 (aged 20)

=== Cannondale ===
As of 1 January 2014.

Rider	Date of birth
Ivan Basso (ITA)	26 November 1977 (aged 36)
George Bennett (NZL)	7 April 1990 (aged 23)
Alberto Bettiol (ITA)	29 October 1993 (aged 20)
Maciej Bodnar (POL)	7 March 1985 (aged 28)
Guillaume Boivin (CAN)	25 September 1989 (aged 24)
Damiano Caruso (ITA)	12 October 1987 (aged 26)
Alessandro De Marchi (ITA)	19 May 1986 (aged 27)
Davide Formolo (ITA)	24 October 1992 (aged 21)
Oscar Gatto (ITA)	1 January 1985 (aged 29)
Ted King (USA)	31 January 1983 (aged 30)
Michel Koch (GER)	15 October 1991 (aged 22)
Kristijan Koren (SLO)	25 November 1986 (aged 27)
Matthias Krizek (AUT)	29 September 1988 (aged 25)
Paolo Longo Borghini (ITA)	10 December 1980 (aged 33)

Rider	Date of birth
Alan Marangoni (ITA)	16 July 1984 (aged 29)
Marco Marcato (ITA)	11 February 1984 (aged 29)
Jean-Marc Marino (FRA)	15 August 1983 (aged 30)
Matej Mohorič (SLO)	19 October 1994 (aged 19)
Moreno Moser (ITA)	25 December 1990 (aged 23)
Daniele Ratto (ITA)	5 October 1989 (aged 24)
Fabio Sabatini (ITA)	18 February 1985 (aged 28)
Juraj Sagan (SVK)	23 December 1988 (aged 25)
Peter Sagan (SVK)	26 January 1990 (aged 23)
Cristiano Salerno (ITA)	18 February 1985 (aged 28)
Cayetano Sarmiento (COL)	28 March 1987 (aged 26)
Davide Villella (ITA)	27 June 1991 (aged 22)
Elia Viviani (ITA)	7 February 1989 (aged 24)
Cameron Wurf (AUS)	3 August 1983 (aged 30)

=== Team Europcar ===
As of 1 January 2014.

Rider	Date of birth
Yukiya Arashiro (JPN)	22 September 1984 (aged 29)
Natnael Berhane (ERI)	5 January 1991 (aged 22)
Giovanni Bernaudeau (FRA)	25 August 1983 (aged 30)
Bryan Coquard (FRA)	25 April 1992 (aged 21)
Jérôme Cousin (FRA)	5 June 1989 (aged 24)
Dan Craven (Note: Craven joined the team on 1 June.) (NAM)	1 February 1983 (aged 30)
Antoine Duchesne (CAN)	12 September 1991 (aged 22)
Jimmy Engoulvent (FRA)	7 December 1979 (aged 34)
Cyril Gautier (FRA)	26 September 1987 (aged 26)
Yohann Gène (FRA)	25 June 1981 (aged 32)
Romain Guillemois (FRA)	28 March 1991 (aged 22)
Tony Hurel (FRA)	1 November 1987 (aged 26)
Fabrice Jeandesboz (FRA)	4 December 1984 (aged 29)
Vincent Jérôme (FRA)	26 November 1984 (aged 29)

Rider	Date of birth
Christophe Kern (FRA)	18 January 1981 (aged 32)
Morgan Lamoisson (FRA)	7 September 1988 (aged 25)
Davide Malacarne (ITA)	11 July 1987 (aged 26)
Yannick Martinez (FRA)	4 May 1988 (aged 25)
Maxime Méderel (FRA)	19 September 1980 (aged 33)
Bryan Nauleau (FRA)	17 March 1988 (aged 25)
Alexandre Pichot (FRA)	6 January 1983 (aged 30)
Perrig Quéméneur (FRA)	26 April 1984 (aged 29)
Kévin Reza (FRA)	18 May 1988 (aged 25)
Pierre Rolland (FRA)	10 October 1986 (aged 27)
Romain Sicard (FRA)	1 January 1988 (aged 26)
Björn Thurau (GER)	23 July 1988 (aged 25)
Angelo Tulik (FRA)	2 December 1990 (aged 23)
Thomas Voeckler (FRA)	22 June 1979 (aged 34)

=== FDJ.fr ===
As of 1 January 2014

Rider	Date of birth
William Bonnet (FRA)	25 June 1982 (aged 31)
David Boucher (BEL)	17 March 1980 (aged 33)
Nacer Bouhanni (FRA)	25 July 1990 (aged 23)
Sébastien Chavanel (FRA)	21 March 1983 (aged 30)
Arnaud Courteille (FRA)	13 March 1989 (aged 24)
Mickaël Delage (FRA)	6 August 1985 (aged 28)
Arnaud Démare (FRA)	26 August 1991 (aged 22)
Kenny Elissonde (FRA)	22 July 1991 (aged 22)
Pierrick Fédrigo (FRA)	30 November 1978 (aged 35)
Murilo Fischer (BRA)	16 June 1979 (aged 34)
Alexandre Geniez (FRA)	16 April 1988 (aged 25)
Anthony Geslin (FRA)	9 June 1980 (aged 33)
Arnold Jeannesson (FRA)	15 January 1986 (aged 27)
Mathieu Ladagnous (FRA)	12 December 1984 (aged 29)
Johan Le Bon (FRA)	3 October 1990 (aged 23)

Rider	Date of birth
Pierre-Henri Lecuisinier (FRA)	30 June 1993 (aged 20)
Laurent Mangel (FRA)	22 May 1981 (aged 32)
Francis Mourey (FRA)	8 December 1980 (aged 33)
Yoann Offredo (FRA)	12 November 1986 (aged 27)
Laurent Pichon (FRA)	19 July 1986 (aged 27)
Cédric Pineau (FRA)	8 May 1985 (aged 28)
Thibaut Pinot (FRA)	29 May 1990 (aged 23)
Anthony Roux (FRA)	18 April 1987 (aged 26)
Jérémy Roy (FRA)	22 June 1983 (aged 30)
Geoffrey Soupe (FRA)	22 March 1988 (aged 25)
Benoît Vaugrenard (FRA)	5 January 1982 (aged 31)
Jussi Veikkanen (FIN)	29 March 1981 (aged 32)
Arthur Vichot (FRA)	26 November 1988 (aged 25)
Émilien Viennet (FRA)	6 February 1992 (aged 21)

=== Garmin–Sharp ===
As of January 1, 2014.

Rider	Date of birth
Janier Acevedo (COL)	December 6, 1985 (aged 28)
Jack Bauer (NZL)	April 7, 1985 (aged 28)
Nate Brown (USA)	July 6, 1991 (aged 22)
André Cardoso (POR)	September 3, 1984 (aged 29)
Tom Danielson (USA)	March 13, 1978 (aged 35)
Thomas Dekker (NED)	September 6, 1984 (aged 29)
Rohan Dennis (AUS)	May 28, 1990 (aged 23)
Caleb Fairly (USA)	February 19, 1987 (aged 26)
Tyler Farrar (USA)	June 2, 1984 (aged 29)
Koldo Fernández (ESP)	September 13, 1981 (aged 32)
Phil Gaimon (USA)	January 28, 1986 (aged 27)
Nathan Haas (AUS)	March 12, 1989 (aged 24)
Ryder Hesjedal (CAN)	December 9, 1980 (aged 33)
Alex Howes (USA)	January 1, 1988 (aged 26)
Ben King (USA)	March 22, 1989 (aged 24)

Rider	Date of birth
Raymond Kreder (NED)	November 26, 1989 (aged 24)
Sebastian Langeveld (NED)	January 17, 1985 (aged 28)
Dan Martin (IRE)	August 20, 1986 (aged 27)
David Millar (GBR)	January 4, 1977 (aged 36)
Lachlan Morton (AUS)	January 2, 1992 (aged 21)
Ramūnas Navardauskas (LTU)	January 30, 1988 (aged 25)
Lasse Norman Hansen (DEN)	February 11, 1992 (aged 21)
Nick Nuyens (BEL)	May 5, 1980 (aged 33)
Tom-Jelte Slagter (NED)	July 1, 1989 (aged 24)
Andrew Talansky (USA)	November 23, 1988 (aged 25)
Dylan van Baarle (NED)	May 22, 1993 (aged 20)
Johan Vansummeren (BEL)	February 4, 1981 (aged 32)
Steele Von Hoff (AUS)	December 31, 1987 (aged 26)
Fabian Wegmann (GER)	June 20, 1980 (aged 33)

=== Giant–Shimano ===
As of 1 January 2014.

Rider	Date of birth
Jonas Ahlstrand (SWE)	16 February 1990 (aged 23)
Nikias Arndt (GER)	18 November 1991 (aged 22)
Brian Bulgaç (Note: Bulgaç joined the team on April 28.) (NED)	7 April 1988 (aged 25)
Warren Barguil (FRA)	28 October 1991 (aged 22)
Lawson Craddock (USA)	20 February 1992 (aged 21)
Roy Curvers (NED)	27 December 1979 (aged 34)
Thomas Damuseau (FRA)	18 March 1989 (aged 24)
Bert De Backer (BEL)	2 April 1984 (aged 29)
Koen de Kort (NED)	8 September 1982 (aged 31)
John Degenkolb (GER)	7 January 1989 (aged 24)
Dries Devenyns (BEL)	22 July 1983 (aged 30)
Tom Dumoulin (NED)	11 November 1990 (aged 23)
Johannes Fröhlinger (GER)	9 June 1985 (aged 28)
Simon Geschke (GER)	13 March 1986 (aged 27)
Chad Haga (USA)	26 August 1988 (aged 25)

Rider	Date of birth
Thierry Hupond (FRA)	10 November 1984 (aged 29)
Reinardt Janse van Rensburg (RSA)	3 February 1989 (aged 24)
Ji Cheng (CHN)	15 July 1987 (aged 26)
Marcel Kittel (GER)	11 May 1988 (aged 25)
Loh Sea Keong (MYS)	2 November 1986 (aged 27)
Tobias Ludvigsson (SWE)	22 February 1991 (aged 22)
Luka Mezgec (SLO)	27 June 1988 (aged 25)
Daan Olivier (NED)	24 November 1992 (aged 21)
Tom Peterson (USA)	24 December 1986 (aged 27)
Georg Preidler (AUT)	17 June 1990 (aged 23)
Ramon Sinkeldam (NED)	9 February 1989 (aged 24)
Matthieu Sprick (FRA)	29 September 1981 (aged 32)
Tom Stamsnijder (NED)	15 May 1985 (aged 28)
Albert Timmer (NED)	13 June 1985 (aged 28)
Tom Veelers (NED)	14 September 1984 (aged 29)

=== Team Katusha ===
As of 1 January 2014.

Rider	Date of birth
Maxim Belkov (RUS)	9 January 1985 (aged 28)
Pavel Brutt (RUS)	29 January 1982 (aged 31)
Giampaolo Caruso (ITA)	15 August 1980 (aged 33)
Sergey Chernetskiy (RUS)	9 April 1990 (aged 23)
Vladimir Gusev (RUS)	4 July 1982 (aged 31)
Marco Haller (AUT)	1 April 1991 (aged 22)
Petr Ignatenko (RUS)	27 September 1987 (aged 26)
Mikhail Ignatiev (RUS)	7 May 1985 (aged 28)
Vladimir Isaichev (RUS)	26 April 1986 (aged 27)
Pavel Kochetkov (RUS)	7 March 1986 (aged 27)
Alexandr Kolobnev (RUS)	4 May 1981 (aged 32)
Dmitry Kozonchuk (RUS)	5 April 1984 (aged 29)
Alexander Kristoff (NOR)	5 July 1987 (aged 26)
Aleksandr Kuschynski (BLR)	27 October 1979 (aged 34)
Vyacheslav Kuznetsov (RUS)	24 June 1989 (aged 24)

Rider	Date of birth
Alberto Losada (ESP)	28 February 1982 (aged 31)
Daniel Moreno (ESP)	5 September 1981 (aged 32)
Luca Paolini (ITA)	17 January 1977 (aged 36)
Alexander Porsev (RUS)	21 February 1986 (aged 27)
Joaquim Rodríguez (ESP)	12 May 1979 (aged 34)
Alexander Rybakov (RUS)	17 May 1988 (aged 25)
Rüdiger Selig (GER)	19 February 1989 (aged 24)
Egor Silin (RUS)	25 June 1988 (aged 25)
Gatis Smukulis (LAT)	15 April 1987 (aged 26)
Simon Špilak (SLO)	23 June 1986 (aged 27)
Yuri Trofimov (RUS)	26 January 1984 (aged 29)
Alexey Tsatevich (RUS)	5 July 1989 (aged 24)
Ángel Vicioso (ESP)	13 April 1977 (aged 36)
Eduard Vorganov (RUS)	1 December 1982 (aged 31)
Anton Vorobyev (RUS)	12 October 1990 (aged 23)

=== Lampre–Merida ===
As of 30 January 2014

Rider	Date of birth
Winner Anacona (COL)	11 August 1988 (aged 25)
Niccolò Bonifazio (ITA)	29 October 1993 (aged 20)
Matteo Bono (ITA)	11 November 1983 (aged 30)
Mattia Cattaneo (ITA)	25 October 1990 (aged 23)
Davide Cimolai (ITA)	13 August 1989 (aged 24)
Valerio Conti (ITA)	30 March 1993 (aged 20)
Rui Costa (POR)	5 October 1986 (aged 27)
Damiano Cunego (ITA)	19 September 1981 (aged 32)
Luca Dodi (ITA)	26 May 1987 (aged 26)
Kristijan Đurasek (CRO)	26 July 1987 (aged 26)
Elia Favilli (ITA)	31 January 1989 (aged 24)
Roberto Ferrari (ITA)	9 March 1983 (aged 30)
Chris Horner (USA)	23 October 1971 (aged 42)

Rider	Date of birth
Sacha Modolo (ITA)	19 June 1987 (aged 26)
Manuele Mori (ITA)	9 August 1980 (aged 33)
Przemysław Niemiec (POL)	11 April 1980 (aged 33)
Nelson Oliveira (POR)	6 March 1989 (aged 24)
Andrea Palini (ITA)	16 June 1989 (aged 24)
Jan Polanc (SLO)	6 May 1992 (aged 21)
Filippo Pozzato (ITA)	10 September 1981 (aged 32)
Maximiliano Richeze (ARG)	7 March 1983 (aged 30)
José Serpa (COL)	17 April 1979 (aged 34)
Diego Ulissi (ITA)	15 July 1989 (aged 24)
Rafael Valls (ESP)	27 June 1987 (aged 26)
Luca Wackermann (ITA)	13 March 1992 (aged 21)
Xu Gang (CHN)	28 January 1984 (aged 29)

=== Lotto–Belisol ===
As of 15 February 2014.

Rider	Date of birth
Sander Armée (BEL)	10 December 1985 (aged 28)
Lars Bak (DEN)	16 January 1980 (aged 33)
Kris Boeckmans (BEL)	13 February 1987 (aged 26)
Vegard Breen (NOR)	8 February 1990 (aged 23)
Stig Broeckx (BEL)	10 May 1990 (aged 23)
Sean De Bie (BEL)	3 October 1991 (aged 22)
Bart De Clercq (BEL)	26 August 1986 (aged 27)
Jens Debusschere (BEL)	28 August 1989 (aged 24)
Kenny Dehaes (BEL)	10 November 1984 (aged 29)
Gert Dockx (BEL)	4 July 1988 (aged 25)
Tony Gallopin (FRA)	19 April 1988 (aged 25)
André Greipel (GER)	16 July 1982 (aged 31)
Adam Hansen (AUS)	11 May 1981 (aged 32)
Greg Henderson (NZL)	10 September 1976 (aged 37)

Rider	Date of birth
Olivier Kaisen (Note: Kaisen was forced to retire from the sport on 10 February, on medical advice.) (BEL)	30 April 1983 (aged 30)
Pim Ligthart (NED)	16 June 1988 (aged 25)
Maxime Monfort (BEL)	14 January 1983 (aged 30)
Jürgen Roelandts (BEL)	2 July 1985 (aged 28)
Marcel Sieberg (GER)	30 April 1982 (aged 31)
Boris Vallée (BEL)	3 June 1993 (aged 20)
Jurgen Van den Broeck (BEL)	1 February 1983 (aged 30)
Tosh Van der Sande (BEL)	28 November 1990 (aged 23)
Dennis Vanendert (BEL)	27 June 1988 (aged 25)
Jelle Vanendert (BEL)	19 February 1985 (aged 28)
Jonas van Genechten (BEL)	16 September 1986 (aged 27)
Tim Wellens (BEL)	10 May 1991 (aged 22)
Frederik Willems (BEL)	8 September 1979 (aged 34)

=== Movistar Team ===
As of 1 January 2014.

Rider	Date of birth
Andrey Amador (CRC)	29 August 1986 (aged 27)
Igor Antón (ESP)	2 March 1983 (aged 30)
Eros Capecchi (ITA)	13 June 1986 (aged 27)
Jonathan Castroviejo (ESP)	27 April 1987 (aged 26)
Alex Dowsett (GBR)	3 October 1988 (aged 25)
Imanol Erviti (ESP)	15 November 1983 (aged 30)
John Gadret (FRA)	22 April 1979 (aged 34)
Iván Gutiérrez (ESP)	27 November 1978 (aged 35)
Jesús Herrada (ESP)	26 July 1990 (aged 23)
José Herrada (ESP)	1 October 1985 (aged 28)
Beñat Intxausti (ESP)	20 March 1986 (aged 27)
Gorka Izagirre (ESP)	7 October 1987 (aged 26)
Ion Izagirre (ESP)	4 February 1988 (aged 25)
Pablo Lastras (ESP)	20 January 1976 (aged 37)

Rider	Date of birth
Juan José Lobato (ESP)	28 December 1988 (aged 25)
Adriano Malori (ITA)	28 January 1988 (aged 25)
Javier Moreno (ESP)	18 July 1984 (aged 29)
Rubén Plaza (ESP)	29 February 1980 (aged 33)
Dayer Quintana (COL)	10 August 1992 (aged 21)
Nairo Quintana (COL)	4 February 1990 (aged 23)
José Joaquín Rojas (ESP)	8 June 1985 (aged 28)
Enrique Sanz (ESP)	11 September 1989 (aged 24)
Jasha Sütterlin (GER)	4 November 1992 (aged 21)
Sylwester Szmyd (POL)	2 March 1978 (aged 35)
Alejandro Valverde (ESP)	25 April 1980 (aged 33)
Francisco Ventoso (ESP)	6 May 1982 (aged 31)
Giovanni Visconti (ITA)	13 January 1983 (aged 30)

=== Omega Pharma–Quick-Step ===
As of 1 September 2014.

Rider	Date of birth
Julian Alaphilippe (FRA)	11 June 1992 (aged 22)
Jan Bakelants (BEL)	14 February 1986 (aged 28)
Tom Boonen (BEL)	15 October 1980 (aged 33)
Gianluca Brambilla (ITA)	22 August 1987 (aged 27)
Mark Cavendish (GBR)	21 May 1985 (aged 29)
Thomas De Gendt (BEL)	6 November 1986 (aged 27)
Kevin De Weert (BEL)	27 May 1982 (aged 32)
Andrew Fenn (GBR)	1 July 1990 (aged 24)
Michał Gołaś (POL)	29 September 1984 (aged 29)
Iljo Keisse (BEL)	21 December 1982 (aged 31)
Michał Kwiatkowski (POL)	2 June 1990 (aged 24)
Nikolas Maes (BEL)	9 April 1986 (aged 28)
Tony Martin (GER)	23 April 1985 (aged 29)
Gianni Meersman (BEL)	5 December 1985 (aged 28)
Serge Pauwels (BEL)	23 November 1983 (aged 30)

Rider	Date of birth
Alessandro Petacchi (ITA)	3 January 1974 (aged 40)
Wout Poels (NED)	1 October 1987 (aged 26)
Mark Renshaw (AUS)	22 October 1982 (aged 31)
Pieter Serry (BEL)	21 November 1988 (aged 25)
Gert Steegmans (BEL)	30 September 1980 (aged 33)
Zdeněk Štybar (CZE)	11 December 1985 (aged 28)
Niki Terpstra (NED)	18 May 1984 (aged 30)
Matteo Trentin (ITA)	2 August 1989 (aged 25)
Rigoberto Urán (COL)	26 January 1987 (aged 27)
Petr Vakoč (CZE)	11 July 1992 (aged 22)
Guillaume Van Keirsbulck (BEL)	14 February 1991 (aged 23)
Stijn Vandenbergh (BEL)	25 April 1984 (aged 30)
Martin Velits (SVK)	21 February 1985 (aged 29)
Julien Vermote (BEL)	26 July 1989 (aged 25)
Carlos Verona (ESP)	4 November 1992 (aged 21)

=== Orica–GreenEDGE ===
As of 1 January 2014.

Rider	Date of birth
Michael Albasini (SUI)	20 December 1980 (aged 33)
Sam Bewley (NZL)	22 July 1987 (aged 26)
Esteban Chaves (COL)	17 January 1990 (aged 23)
Simon Clarke (AUS)	18 July 1986 (aged 27)
Mitchell Docker (AUS)	2 October 1986 (aged 27)
Luke Durbridge (AUS)	9 April 1991 (aged 22)
Simon Gerrans (AUS)	16 May 1980 (aged 33)
Matthew Goss (AUS)	5 November 1986 (aged 27)
Mathew Hayman (AUS)	20 April 1978 (aged 35)
Michael Hepburn (AUS)	17 August 1991 (aged 22)
Leigh Howard (AUS)	18 October 1989 (aged 24)
Damien Howson (AUS)	13 August 1992 (aged 21)
Daryl Impey (RSA)	6 December 1984 (aged 29)

Rider	Date of birth
Jens Keukeleire (BEL)	23 November 1988 (aged 25)
Aidis Kruopis (LIT)	26 October 1986 (aged 27)
Brett Lancaster (AUS)	15 November 1979 (aged 34)
Michael Matthews (AUS)	26 September 1990 (aged 23)
Christian Meier (CAN)	2 September 1985 (aged 28)
Cameron Meyer (AUS)	11 January 1988 (aged 25)
Jens Mouris (NED)	12 March 1980 (aged 33)
Ivan Santaromita (ITA)	30 April 1984 (aged 28)
Svein Tuft (CAN)	19 May 1977 (aged 36)
Pieter Weening (NED)	5 April 1981 (aged 32)
Adam Yates (GBR)	7 August 1992 (aged 21)
Simon Yates (GBR)	7 August 1992 (aged 21)

=== Team Sky ===
As of 14 April 2014.

Rider	Date of birth
Edvald Boasson Hagen (NOR)	17 May 1987 (aged 26)
Ian Boswell (USA)	7 February 1991 (aged 22)
Dario Cataldo (ITA)	17 March 1985 (aged 28)
Philip Deignan (IRL)	7 September 1983 (aged 30)
Joe Dombrowski (USA)	12 May 1991 (aged 22)
Nathan Earle (AUS)	4 June 1988 (aged 25)
Josh Edmondson (GBR)	6 July 1992 (aged 21)
Bernhard Eisel (AUT)	17 February 1981 (aged 32)
Chris Froome (GBR)	20 May 1985 (aged 28)
Sebastián Henao (COL)	5 August 1993 (aged 20)
Sergio Henao (COL)	10 December 1987 (aged 26)
Peter Kennaugh (GBR)	15 June 1989 (aged 24)
Vasil Kiryienka (BLR)	28 June 1981 (aged 32)
Christian Knees (GER)	5 March 1981 (aged 32)
David López (ESP)	13 May 1981 (aged 32)

Rider	Date of birth
Mikel Nieve (ESP)	26 May 1984 (aged 29)
Danny Pate (USA)	23 March 1979 (aged 34)
Richie Porte (AUS)	30 January 1985 (aged 28)
Salvatore Puccio (ITA)	31 August 1989 (aged 24)
Gabriel Rasch (Note: Rasch retired from the sport on 13 April, after completing Paris–Roubaix.) (NOR)	8 April 1976 (aged 37)
Luke Rowe (GBR)	10 March 1990 (aged 23)
Kanstantsin Sivtsov (BLR)	9 August 1982 (aged 31)
Ian Stannard (GBR)	25 May 1987 (aged 26)
Chris Sutton (AUS)	10 September 1984 (aged 29)
Ben Swift (GBR)	5 November 1987 (aged 26)
Geraint Thomas (GBR)	25 May 1986 (aged 27)
Jonathan Tiernan-Locke (Note: Tiernan-Locke was sacked by the team on 17 July, following his two-year suspension for biological passport irregularities.) (GBR)	26 December 1984 (aged 29)
Bradley Wiggins (GBR)	28 April 1980 (aged 33)
Xabier Zandio (ESP)	17 March 1977 (aged 36)

=== Tinkoff–Saxo ===
As of 11 March 2014.

Rider	Date of birth
Edward Beltrán (Note: Beltrán joined the team on 4 March, from the Nankang–Fondriest team.) (COL)	18 January 1990 (aged 23)
Daniele Bennati (ITA)	24 September 1980 (aged 33)
Manuele Boaro (ITA)	3 December 1987 (aged 26)
Matti Breschel (DEN)	31 August 1984 (aged 29)
Alberto Contador (ESP)	6 December 1982 (aged 31)
Jesper Hansen (DEN)	4 May 1991 (aged 22)
Jesús Hernández (ESP)	28 September 1981 (aged 32)
Christopher Juul-Jensen (DEN)	6 July 1989 (aged 24)
Michael Kolář (SVK)	21 December 1992 (aged 21)
Roman Kreuziger (CZE)	6 May 1986 (aged 27)
Karsten Kroon (NED)	29 January 1976 (aged 37)
Marko Kump (SLO)	9 September 1988 (aged 25)
Rafał Majka (POL)	12 September 1989 (aged 24)
Jay McCarthy (AUS)	8 September 1992 (aged 21)
Michael Mørkøv (DEN)	30 April 1985 (aged 28)

Rider	Date of birth
Sérgio Paulinho (POR)	26 March 1980 (aged 33)
Evgeni Petrov (RUS)	25 May 1978 (aged 35)
Bruno Pires (POR)	15 May 1981 (aged 32)
Paweł Poljański (POL)	6 May 1990 (aged 23)
Nicolas Roche (IRL)	3 July 1984 (aged 29)
Michael Rogers (AUS)	20 December 1979 (aged 34)
Ivan Rovny (RUS)	30 September 1987 (aged 26)
Chris Anker Sørensen (DEN)	5 September 1984 (aged 29)
Nicki Sørensen (DEN)	14 May 1975 (aged 38)
Rory Sutherland (AUS)	8 February 1982 (aged 31)
Matteo Tosatto (ITA)	14 May 1974 (aged 39)
Nikolay Trusov (RUS)	2 July 1985 (aged 28)
Michael Valgren (DEN)	7 February 1992 (aged 21)
Oliver Zaugg (SUI)	9 May 1981 (aged 32)

=== Trek Factory Racing ===
As of January 1, 2014.

Rider	Date of birth
Eugenio Alafaci (ITA)	August 9, 1990 (aged 23)
Julián Arredondo (COL)	July 30, 1988 (aged 25)
Fumiyuki Beppu (JPN)	April 10, 1983 (aged 30)
Matthew Busche (USA)	May 9, 1985 (aged 28)
Fabian Cancellara (SUI)	March 18, 1981 (aged 32)
Stijn Devolder (BEL)	August 29, 1979 (aged 34)
Laurent Didier (LUX)	July 19, 1984 (aged 29)
Fabio Felline (ITA)	March 29, 1990 (aged 23)
Danilo Hondo (GER)	January 4, 1974 (aged 39)
Markel Irizar (ESP)	February 5, 1980 (aged 33)
Bob Jungels (LUX)	September 22, 1992 (aged 21)
Robert Kišerlovski (CRO)	August 9, 1986 (aged 27)
Giacomo Nizzolo (ITA)	January 30, 1989 (aged 24)
Yaroslav Popovych (UKR)	January 4, 1980 (aged 33)

Rider	Date of birth
Grégory Rast (SUI)	January 17, 1980 (aged 33)
Hayden Roulston (NZL)	January 10, 1981 (aged 32)
Andy Schleck (LUX)	June 10, 1985 (aged 28)
Fränk Schleck (LUX)	April 15, 1980 (aged 33)
Jesse Sergent (NZL)	July 8, 1988 (aged 25)
Fábio Silvestre (POR)	January 25, 1990 (aged 23)
Jasper Stuyven (BEL)	April 17, 1992 (aged 21)
Boy van Poppel (NED)	January 18, 1988 (aged 25)
Danny van Poppel (NED)	July 26, 1993 (aged 20)
Kristof Vandewalle (BEL)	April 5, 1985 (aged 28)
Jens Voigt (GER)	September 17, 1971 (aged 42)
Calvin Watson (AUS)	January 6, 1993 (aged 20)
Riccardo Zoidl (AUT)	April 8, 1988 (aged 25)
Haimar Zubeldia (ESP)	April 1, 1977 (aged 36)

== See also ==
- 2014 in men's road cycling
- List of 2014 UCI Professional Continental and Continental teams
- List of 2014 UCI Women's Teams

Preceded by 2013	List of UCI ProTeams and riders 2014	Succeeded by 2015
