= 2015 Team Europcar season =

Team Europcar
- 2015 season
- UCI code: EUC
- Status: UCI Professional Continental
- Manager: Jean-René Bernaudeau
- Main sponsor(s): Europcar
- Based: France
- Bicycles: Colnago

Season victories
- One-day races: 1
- Stage race overall: 1
- Stage race stages: 6
- National Championships: 1

The 2015 season for the Team Europcar cycling team began in January at the Tour de San Luis. Team Europcar is a French-registered UCI Professional Continental cycling team that participated in road bicycle racing events on the UCI Continental Circuits and when selected as a wildcard to UCI ProTour events.

== Team roster ==
Rider	Date of birth
Yukiya Arashiro (JPN)	22 September 1984 (aged 30)
Giovanni Bernaudeau (FRA)	25 August 1983 (aged 31)
Thomas Boudat (FRA)	24 February 1994 (aged 20)
Bryan Coquard (FRA)	25 April 1992 (aged 22)
Jérôme Cousin (FRA)	5 June 1989 (aged 25)
Dan Craven (NAM)	1 February 1983 (aged 31)
Antoine Duchesne (CAN)	12 September 1991 (aged 23)
Jimmy Engoulvent (FRA)	7 December 1979 (aged 35)
Cyril Gautier (FRA)	26 September 1987 (aged 27)
Yohann Gène (FRA)	25 June 1981 (aged 33)
Romain Guillemois (FRA)	28 March 1991 (aged 23)
Tony Hurel (FRA)	1 November 1987 (aged 27)
Fabrice Jeandesboz (FRA)	4 December 1984 (aged 30)

Rider	Date of birth
Vincent Jérôme (FRA)	26 November 1984 (aged 30)
Morgan Lamoisson (FRA)	7 September 1988 (aged 26)
Yannick Martinez (FRA)	4 May 1988 (aged 26)
Maxime Méderel (FRA)	19 September 1980 (aged 34)
Julien Morice (FRA)	20 July 1991 (aged 23)
Bryan Nauleau (FRA)	17 March 1988 (aged 26)
Alexandre Pichot (FRA)	6 January 1983 (aged 31)
Perrig Quéméneur (FRA)	26 April 1984 (aged 30)
Pierre Rolland (FRA)	10 October 1986 (aged 28)
Romain Sicard (FRA)	1 January 1988 (aged 27)
Guillaume Thévenot (FRA)	13 September 1993 (aged 21)
Angelo Tulik (FRA)	2 December 1990 (aged 24)
Thomas Voeckler (FRA)	22 June 1979 (aged 35)

Riders who joined the team for the 2015 season

Rider	2014 team
Thomas Boudat	neo-pro (Vendée U)
Julien Morice	neo-pro (Vendée U)
Guillaume Thévenot	neo-pro (Vendée U)

Riders who left the team during or after the 2014 season

Rider	2015 team
Natnael Berhane	MTN–Qhubeka
Christophe Kern	Retired
Davide Malacarne	Astana
Kévin Reza	FDJ
Björn Thurau	Bora–Argon 18

== Season victories ==
Date	Race	Competition	Rider	Country	Location
6 February	Étoile de Bessèges, Stage 3	UCI Europe Tour	Bryan Coquard (FRA)	France	Bessèges
22 February	La Tropicale Amissa Bongo, Points classification	UCI Africa Tour	Yohann Gène (FRA)	Gabon	
22 February	La Tropicale Amissa Bongo, Mountains classification	UCI Africa Tour	Giovanni Bernaudeau (FRA)	Gabon	
26 March	Classica Corsica	UCI Europe Tour	Thomas Boudat (FRA)	France	Bastia
19 April	Vuelta a Castilla y León, Stage 3	UCI Europe Tour	Pierre Rolland (FRA)	Spain	Lubián
19 April	Vuelta a Castilla y León, Overall	UCI Europe Tour	Pierre Rolland (FRA)	Spain	
19 April	Vuelta a Castilla y León, Combination classification	UCI Europe Tour	Pierre Rolland (FRA)	Spain	
6 May	Four Days of Dunkirk, Stage 1	UCI Europe Tour	Bryan Coquard (FRA)	France	Orchies
10 May	Four Days of Dunkirk, Points classification	UCI Europe Tour	Bryan Coquard (FRA)	France	
10 May	Four Days of Dunkirk, Young rider classification	UCI Europe Tour	Bryan Coquard (FRA)	France	
16 May	Rhône-Alpes Isère Tour, Stage 3	UCI Europe Tour	Fabrice Jeandesboz (FRA)	France	Saint-Maurice-l'Exil
19 June	Route du Sud, Stage 2	UCI Europe Tour	Bryan Coquard (FRA)	France	Saint-Gaudens
21 June	Route du Sud, Stage 4	UCI Europe Tour	Bryan Coquard (FRA)	France	Gaillac
21 June	Route du Sud, Points classification	UCI Europe Tour	Bryan Coquard (FRA)	France	

== National, Continental and World champions 2015 ==
Date	Discipline	Jersey	Rider	Country	Location
1 February	Namibia National Road Race Champion		Dan Craven (NAM)	Namibia	Windhoek
