= 2015 La Tropicale Amissa Bongo =

2015 UCI Africa Tour, race 5
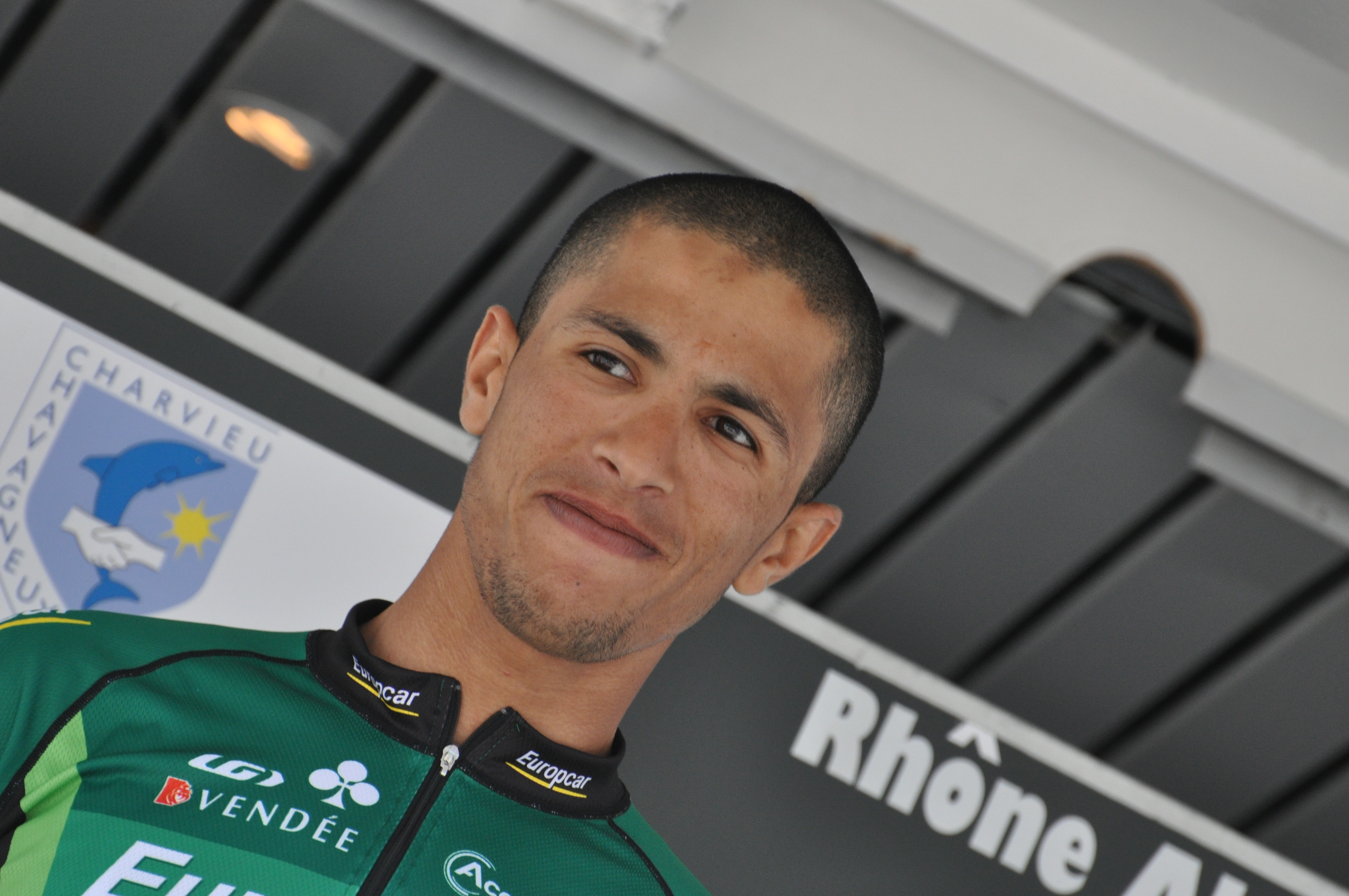
- Rafaâ Chtioui, winner of the 2015 La Tropicale Amissa Bongo

Race details
- Dates: 16–22 February 2015
- Stages: 8
- Distance: 955.3 km (593.6 mi)
- Winning time: 23h 02' 08"

Results
Jersey awarded to the overall winner	Winner	Rafaâ Chtioui (TUN)	(Skydive Dubai–Al Ahli)
	Second	Giovanni Bernaudeau (FRA)	(Team Europcar)
	Third	Abdelkader Belmokhtar (ALG)	(Algeria)
Jersey awarded to the points classification winner	Points	Yohann Gène (FRA)	(Team Europcar)
Jersey awarded to the mountains classification winner	Mountains	Giovanni Bernaudeau (FRA)	(Team Europcar)
Jersey awarded to the youth classification winner	Youth	Bonaventure Uwizeyimana (RWA)	(Rwanda)
	Team	Skydive Dubai–Al Ahli	

The 2015 La Tropicale Amissa Bongo was the tenth edition of the La Tropicale Amissa Bongo road cycling stage race held in Gabon. It was held between 16 and 22 February 2015. It was rated a 2.1 event and was part of the 2015 UCI Africa Tour. The race is therefore the highest ranked stage race in Africa.

The race is known for bringing amateur African cycling teams together with professional teams from Europe. Team Europcar had dominated the recent editions of the race, having won every edition between 2010 and 2014. The 2014 champion was Natnael Berhane, the first African to win the event, but he was not selected to defend his title. His teammate Yohann Gène was chosen to lead Team Europcar instead.

The 2015 race consisted of eight stages. These began with difficult, hilly stages in eastern Gabon, before coming to the western coast for several stages suitable for sprinters. There was also a team time trial that took place at night, although the times for this did not play a part in the general classification, because of a delay to the start of the stage. The key stage in the general classification of the 2015 race was stage 1, when a breakaway of three riders escaped and was able to stay away throughout the stage; the same riders made up the final podium. Rafaâ Chtioui (Skydive Dubai–Al Ahli) won the first and second stages and took the yellow jersey for the overall victory. These were the first professional wins of his career. Chtioui was the first Tunisian to win the overall victory in the race, and the second African. Following his victory, he became the leader of the 2015 UCI Africa Tour rankings.

The other riders to break away on stage 1, Giovanni Bernaudeau (Team Europcar) and Abdelkader Belmokhtar (Algeria), finished second and third respectively in the general classification. Bernaudeau also won the green and white jersey of the mountains classification. Four of the stages in the race were won by the Bretagne–Séché Environnement team. Three of these were won by Yauheni Hutarovich. The rose jersey of the points classification, however, was won by Yohann Gène, who finished in the top 10 in six stages. The white jersey of the best young rider was won by Bonaventure Uwizeyimana (Rwanda).

== Teams ==
Fifteen teams were selected to take part in the 2015 edition of the race. Four of these were Professional Continental teams; two were Continental teams; nine were national cycling teams from various African nations.

- Team Europcar
- Gabon (national team)
- Eritrea (national team)
- Wanty–Groupe Gobert
- Morocco (national team)
- Rwanda (national team)
- Bretagne–Séché Environnement
- Algeria (national team)
- South Africa (national team)
- Skydive Dubai–Al Ahli
- Côte d'Ivoire (national team)
- Cameroon (national team)
- Bike Aid
- Burkina Faso (national team)
- Roth–Škoda

== Route ==
Locations of stage finishes in Gabon

1	Stage 1, Bongoville to Moanda
2	Stage 2, Okondja to Franceville
3	Stage 3, Mounana to Koulamoutou
4	Stage 4, Ndjolé to Lambaréné
5	Stage 5, Lambaréné to Kango
6	Stage 6, Port-Gentil to Port-Gentil (team time trial)
7	Stage 7, Port-Gentil to Port-Gentil
8	Stage 8, Libreville to Libreville

The race was scheduled to be made up of eight stages. Seven of these were road stages, while one was a team time trial. This was the first time a team time trial was included in the race, which also included the hilly eastern portion of Gabon for the first time. The race was therefore expected to be more selective, whereas in the past it had suited sprinters.

List of stages
Stage	Date	Course	Type	Distance	Winner
1	16 February	Bongoville to Moanda	Hilly stage	100 km (62.1 mi)	Rafaâ Chtioui (TUN)
2	17 February	Okondja to Franceville	Hilly stage	170.7 km (106.1 mi)	Rafaâ Chtioui (TUN)
3	18 February	Mounana to Koulamoutou	Hilly stage	157.2 km (97.7 mi)	Daniel McLay (GBR)
4	19 February	Ndjolé to Lambaréné	Hilly stage	132.5 km (82.3 mi)	Andrea Palini (ITA)
5	20 February	Lambaréné to Kango	Flat stage	143 km (88.9 mi)	Yauheni Hutarovich (BLR)
6	20 February	Port-Gentil to Port-Gentil	Team time trial	8.5 km (5.3 mi)	Morocco
7	21 February	Port-Gentil to Port-Gentil	Flat stage	116.6 km (72.5 mi)	Yauheni Hutarovich (BLR)
8	22 February	Akanda to Libreville	Flat stage	126.8 km (78.8 mi)	Yauheni Hutarovich (BLR)

== Stages ==
=== Stage 1 ===
16 February 2015 — Bongoville to Moanda, 100 km (62.1 mi)

Stage 1 was a 100 km (62 mi) route from Bongoville to Moanda. On a hot and sunny day, Rafaâ Chtioui (Skydive Dubai–Al Ahli), Abdelkader Belmokhtar (Algeria), Giovanni Bernaudeau (Team Europcar) formed a breakaway in the twenty-ninth kilometre. Chtioui dropped his companions on a difficult and hilly course, coming home nearly two minutes ahead of the other breakaway riders and three minutes ahead of the peloton, giving him a large advantage in the general classification. This was the first time that an African rider had won the first stage of the race.

Stage 1 result
Rank	Rider	Team	Time
1	Rafaâ Chtioui (TUN)	Skydive Dubai–Al Ahli	2h 45' 43"
2	Abdelkader Belmokhtar (ALG)	Algeria	+ 1' 49"
3	Giovanni Bernaudeau (FRA)	Team Europcar	+ 2' 04"
4	Bonaventure Uwizeyimana (RWA)	Rwanda	+ 2' 56"
5	Edgar Pinto (POR)	Skydive Dubai–Al Ahli	+ 2' 56"
6	Dan Craven (NAM)	Team Europcar	+ 2' 56"
7	Jayde Julius (RSA)	South Africa	+ 2' 56"
8	Francisco Mancebo (ESP)	Skydive Dubai–Al Ahli	+ 2' 56"
9	Jérôme Baugnies (BEL)	Wanty–Groupe Gobert	+ 3' 46"
10	Adil Barbari (ALG)	Algeria	+ 3' 46"

General classification after stage 1
Rank	Rider	Team	Time
1	Rafaâ Chtioui (TUN)	Skydive Dubai–Al Ahli	2h 45' 27"
2	Abdelkader Belmokhtar (ALG)	Algeria	+ 1' 55"
3	Giovanni Bernaudeau (FRA)	Team Europcar	+ 2' 14"
4	Bonaventure Uwizeyimana (RWA)	Rwanda	+ 3' 12"
5	Edgar Pinto (POR)	Skydive Dubai–Al Ahli	+ 3' 12"
6	Dan Craven (NAM)	Team Europcar	+ 3' 12"
7	Jayde Julius (RSA)	South Africa	+ 3' 12"
8	Francisco Mancebo (ESP)	Skydive Dubai–Al Ahli	+ 3' 12"
9	Jérôme Baugnies (BEL)	Wanty–Groupe Gobert	+ 4' 02"
10	Adil Barbari (ALG)	Algeria	+ 4' 02"

=== Stage 2 ===
17 February 2015 — Okondja to Franceville, 170.7 km (106.1 mi)

Stage 2 was a 170.7 km (106 mi) route from Okondja to Franceville. The course was generally flat, with no significant climbs.

The break of the day was formed by Janvier Hadi (Rwanda), Clint Hendricks (South Africa) and Herman Yemeli (Cameroon). Hendricks and Yemeli were caught with approximately 20 km (12 mi) remaining, but Hadi had attacked and was able to remain in front alone. In the final kilometres, he was caught by Azzedine Lagab (Algeria), who had attacked the peloton. Skydive Dubai–Al Ahli, however, controlled the peloton and were able to bring the pair back with 3 km (2 mi) remaining and set up race leader Rafaâ Chtioui for the sprint. Despite a strong sprint from Yohann Gène (Team Europcar), Chtioui won the group sprint to take his second stage victory and extend his lead in the overall classification.

Abdelkader Belmokhtar (Algeria), who had been in second place after the first stage, finished in a group 41 seconds behind the leader. He therefore dropped into third place behind Giovanni Bernaudeau (Team Europcar).

Stage 2 result
Rank	Rider	Team	Time
1	Rafaâ Chtioui (TUN)	Skydive Dubai–Al Ahli	4h 30' 38"
2	Yohann Gène (FRA)	Team Europcar	+ 0"
3	Tesfom Okubamariam (ERI)	Eritrea	+ 0"
4	Meron Amanuel (ERI)	Bike Aid	+ 0"
5	Tim De Troyer (BEL)	Wanty–Groupe Gobert	+ 0"
6	Edgar Pinto (POR)	Skydive Dubai–Al Ahli	+ 0"
7	Jean Bosco Nsengimana (RWA)	Rwanda	+ 0"
8	Maarten de Jonge (NED)	Bike Aid	+ 0"
9	Bryan Nauleau (FRA)	Team Europcar	+ 0"
10	James Vanlandschoot (BEL)	Wanty–Groupe Gobert	+ 0"

General classification after stage 2
Rank	Rider	Team	Time
1	Rafaâ Chtioui (TUN)	Skydive Dubai–Al Ahli	7h 15' 55"
2	Giovanni Bernaudeau (FRA)	Team Europcar	+ 2' 24"
3	Abdelkader Belmokhtar (ALG)	Algeria	+ 2' 46"
4	Edgar Pinto (POR)	Skydive Dubai–Al Ahli	+ 3' 21"
5	Bonaventure Uwizeyimana (RWA)	Rwanda	+ 3' 22"
6	Francisco Mancebo (ESP)	Skydive Dubai–Al Ahli	+ 3' 22"
7	Dan Craven (NAM)	Team Europcar	+ 3' 22"
8	Jayde Julius (RSA)	South Africa	+ 4' 03"
9	Maarten de Jonge (NED)	Bike Aid	+ 4' 12"
10	Jérôme Baugnies (BEL)	Wanty–Groupe Gobert	+ 4' 12"

=== Stage 3 ===
18 February 2015 — Mounana to Koulamoutou, 157.2 km (97.7 mi)

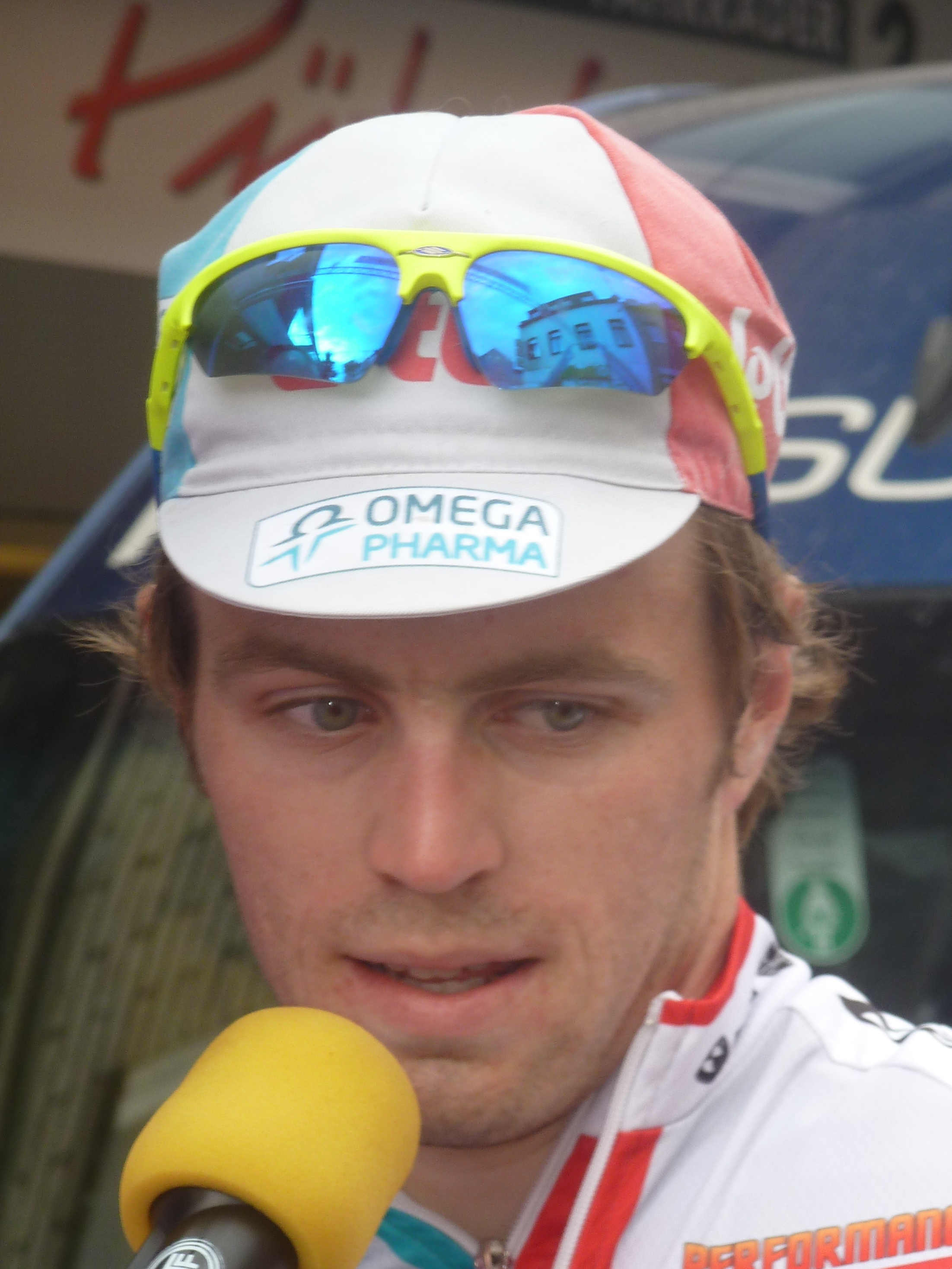
Daniel McLay, winner of stage 3

Stage 3 was a fairly flat 157.2 km (98 mi) route from Mounana to Koulamoutou. The race once again took place in very hot conditions.

The break of the day was formed by Salah Eddine Mraouni (Morocco), Tesfom Okubamariam (Eritrea) and Jean Bosco Uwizeyimana (Rwanda). The three riders escaped at the very beginning of the stage. The chase was controlled by Skydive Dubai–Al Ahli on behalf of Chtioui, the race leader, with Bretagne–Séché Environnement and Team Europcar also participating.

In the final kilometres, with the breakaway caught, Bretagne–Séché Environnement took control of the peloton. The plan was for Daniel McLay to lead out his teammate Yauheni Hutarovich, but, with 300 m (980 ft) remaining, Hutarovich was not in McLay's wheel, so he decided to sprint for himself. McLay and Hutarovich both contested the sprint, with a video replay necessary to determine which rider had won. McLay's victory was the first by a British rider in La Tropicale Amissa Bongo, and the first professional win of his career.

Stage 3 result
Rank	Rider	Team	Time
1	Daniel McLay (GBR)	Bretagne–Séché Environnement	3h 56' 56"
2	Yauheni Hutarovich (BLR)	Bretagne–Séché Environnement	+ 0"
3	Salah Eddine Mraouni (MAR)	Morocco	+ 0"
4	Yohann Gène (FRA)	Team Europcar	+ 0"
5	Andrea Palini (ITA)	Skydive Dubai–Al Ahli	+ 0"
6	Reynard Butler (RSA)	South Africa	+ 0"
7	Meron Teshome (ERI)	Eritrea	+ 0"
8	Fréderique Robert (BEL)	Wanty–Groupe Gobert	+ 0"
9	Hendrik Kruger (RSA)	South Africa	+ 0"
10	Mekseb Debesay (ERI)	Bike Aid	+ 0"

General classification after stage 3
Rank	Rider	Team	Time
1	Rafaâ Chtioui (TUN)	Skydive Dubai–Al Ahli	11h 12' 51"
2	Giovanni Bernaudeau (FRA)	Team Europcar	+ 2' 24"
3	Abdelkader Belmokhtar (ALG)	Algeria	+ 2' 53"
4	Edgar Pinto (POR)	Skydive Dubai–Al Ahli	+ 3' 21"
5	Dan Craven (NAM)	Team Europcar	+ 3' 21"
6	Bonaventure Uwizeyimana (RWA)	Rwanda	+ 3' 22"
7	Francisco Mancebo (ESP)	Skydive Dubai–Al Ahli	+ 3' 29"
8	Salah Eddine Mraouni (MAR)	Morocco	+ 4' 03"
9	Jayde Julius (RSA)	South Africa	+ 4' 03"
10	Maarten de Jonge (NED)	Bike Aid	+ 4' 12"

=== Stage 4 ===
19 February 2015 — Ndjolé to Lambaréné, 132.5 km (82.3 mi)

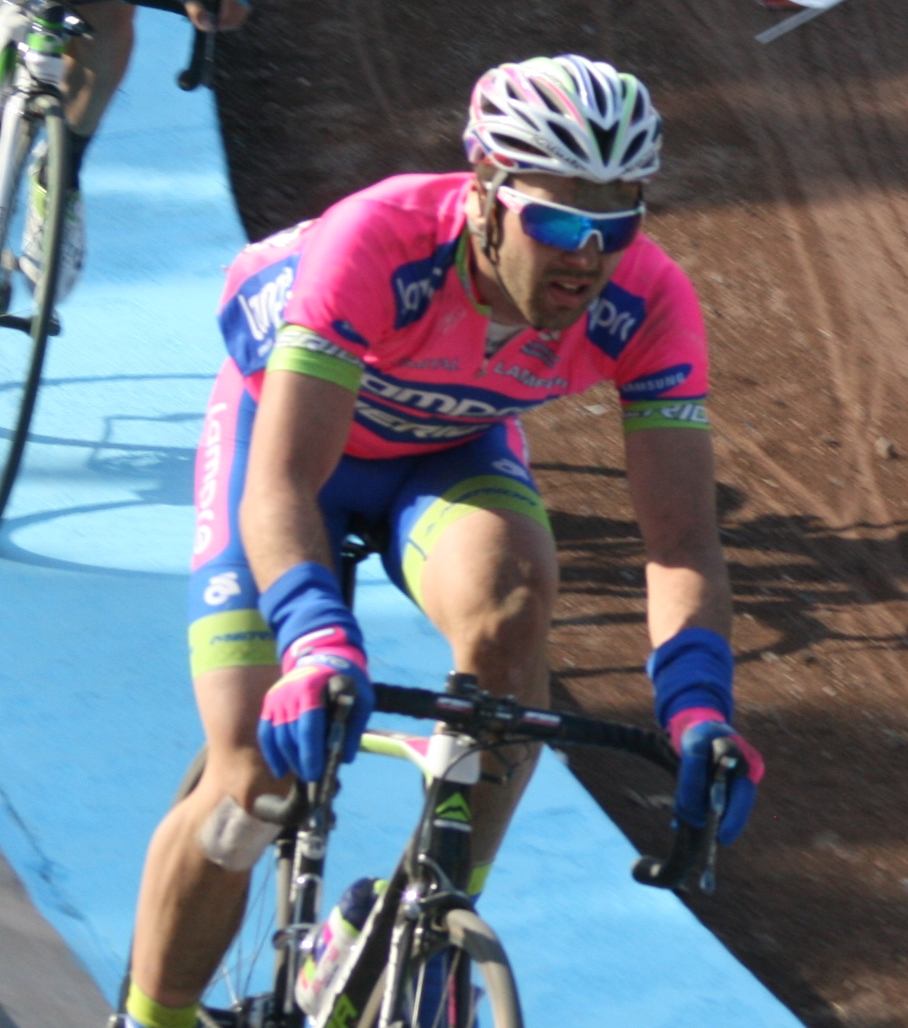
Andrea Palini, winner of stage 4

The fourth stage was a 132.5 km (82 mi) route from Ndjolé to Lambaréné. It was fairly flat, with one hill coming about 20 km (12 mi) from the end.

The breakaway of the day was made by Bryan Nauleau (Team Europcar), Benoît Jarrier (Bretagne–Séché Environnement), Essaïd Abelouache (Morocco) and Adil Barbari (Algeria). They were never able to earn a significant lead. There was another attack with 30 km (19 mi) remaining by Mohammed Errafai (Morocco), and he was able to hold the chasing peloton off until the final 3 km (2 mi).

The sprint was led out by Skydive Dubai–Al Ahli and their sprinter, Andrea Palini launched his sprint with 300 m (980 ft) remaining. No other riders were able to catch him as he took Skydive Dubai–Al Ahli's third stage victory of the race.

Rafaâ Chtioui retained his yellow jersey, while Yohann Gène took over the lead of the points competition.

Stage 4 result
Rank	Rider	Team	Time
1	Andrea Palini (ITA)	Skydive Dubai–Al Ahli	3h 12' 01"
2	Yohann Gène (FRA)	Team Europcar	+ 0"
3	Mekseb Debesay (ERI)	Bike Aid	+ 0"
4	Tim De Troyer (BEL)	Wanty–Groupe Gobert	+ 0"
5	Salah Eddine Mraouni (MAR)	Morocco	+ 0"
6	Hendrik Kruger (RSA)	South Africa	+ 0"
7	Yauheni Hutarovich (BLR)	Bretagne–Séché Environnement	+ 0"
8	Tesfom Okubamariam (ERI)	Eritrea	+ 0"
9	Edgar Pinto (POR)	Skydive Dubai–Al Ahli	+ 0"
10	Bonaventure Uwizeyimana (RWA)	Rwanda	+ 0"

General classification after stage 4
Rank	Rider	Team	Time
1	Rafaâ Chtioui (TUN)	Skydive Dubai–Al Ahli	14h 24' 52"
2	Giovanni Bernaudeau (FRA)	Team Europcar	+ 2' 24"
3	Abdelkader Belmokhtar (ALG)	Algeria	+ 2' 53"
4	Edgar Pinto (POR)	Skydive Dubai–Al Ahli	+ 3' 21"
5	Dan Craven (NAM)	Team Europcar	+ 3' 21"
6	Bonaventure Uwizeyimana (RWA)	Rwanda	+ 3' 22"
7	Francisco Mancebo (ESP)	Skydive Dubai–Al Ahli	+ 3' 29"
8	Salah Eddine Mraouni (MAR)	Morocco	+ 4' 03"
9	Maarten de Jonge (NED)	Bike Aid	+ 4' 12"
10	Anthony Delaplace (FRA)	Bretagne–Séché Environnement	+ 4' 13"

=== Stage 5 ===
20 February 2015 — Lambaréné to Kango, 143 km (88.9 mi)

Stage 5 was a flat 143 km (89 mi) course from Lambaréné to Kango, held on the same day as stage 6.

The stage was decided in a sprint finish, won by Yauheni Hutarovich (Bretagne–Séché Environnement), who had finished second in stage 3. Yohann Gène of Team Europcar finished second in the rose jersey with Tim De Troyer (Wanty–Groupe Gobert) in third. There was no change at the head of the general classification.

Stage 5 result
Rank	Rider	Team	Time
1	Yauheni Hutarovich (BLR)	Bretagne–Séché Environnement	3h 08' 22"
2	Yohann Gène (FRA)	Team Europcar	+ 0"
3	Tim De Troyer (BEL)	Wanty–Groupe Gobert	+ 0"
4	Nolan Hoffman (RSA)	South Africa	+ 0"
5	Reynard Butler (RSA)	South Africa	+ 0"
6	Daniel McLay (GBR)	Bretagne–Séché Environnement	+ 0"
7	Tom Devriendt (BEL)	Wanty–Groupe Gobert	+ 0"
8	Andrea Palini (ITA)	Skydive Dubai–Al Ahli	+ 0"
9	Elyas Afewerki (ERI)	Eritrea	+ 0"
10	Morgan Lamoisson (FRA)	Team Europcar	+ 0"

General classification after stage 5
Rank	Rider	Team	Time
1	Rafaâ Chtioui (TUN)	Skydive Dubai–Al Ahli	17h 33' 14"
2	Giovanni Bernaudeau (FRA)	Team Europcar	+ 2' 24"
3	Abdelkader Belmokhtar (ALG)	Algeria	+ 2' 53"
4	Edgar Pinto (POR)	Skydive Dubai–Al Ahli	+ 3' 21"
5	Dan Craven (NAM)	Team Europcar	+ 3' 21"
6	Bonaventure Uwizeyimana (RWA)	Rwanda	+ 3' 22"
7	Francisco Mancebo (ESP)	Skydive Dubai–Al Ahli	+ 3' 29"
8	Salah Eddine Mraouni (MAR)	Morocco	+ 4' 00"
9	Maarten de Jonge (NED)	Bike Aid	+ 4' 12"
10	Elyas Afewerki (ERI)	Eritrea	+ 4' 13"

=== Stage 6 ===
20 February 2015 — Port-Gentil to Port-Gentil, 8.5 km (5.3 mi), team time trial (TTT)

Stage 6 was a 8.5 km (5 mi) team time trial around Port-Gentil. The course was almost entirely flat and, unusually, was held at night.

Due to problems with air transport, the stage was delayed by two hours. It was therefore decided that the stage results would not count towards the overall classification.

The first team to set a good time was the national team of the host nation, Gabon, who set a time of 11' 41". The Moroccan team took the lead shortly afterwards and went into the lead with a time of 10' 37". It was expected that Bretagne–Séché Environnement, next to finish, would beat this time, but they finished 14" behind. The only other teams to go under 11 minutes were the national teams of Eritrea (who had recently won the African Continental Championships in the discipline) and Rwanda. Skydive Dubai–Al Ahli, with race leader Rafaâ Chtioui, were only able to set the ninth fastest time, over a minute behind the Moroccan team. The biggest team in the race, Team Europcar, was even further behind.

As the stage did not count towards the general classification, Chtioui retained his race lead.

Stage 6 result
Rank	Team	Time
1	Morocco	10' 37"
2	Eritrea	+ 11"
3	Bretagne–Séché Environnement	+ 14"
4	Rwanda	+ 16"
5	Algeria	+ 33"
6	South Africa	+ 36"
7	Cameroon	+ 47"
8	Gabon	+ 1' 04"
9	Skydive Dubai–Al Ahli	+ 1' 09"
10	Burkina Faso	+ 1' 14"

General classification after stage 6
Rank	Rider	Team	Time
1	Rafaâ Chtioui (TUN)	Skydive Dubai–Al Ahli	17h 33' 14"
2	Giovanni Bernaudeau (FRA)	Team Europcar	+ 2' 24"
3	Abdelkader Belmokhtar (ALG)	Algeria	+ 2' 53"
4	Edgar Pinto (POR)	Skydive Dubai–Al Ahli	+ 3' 21"
5	Dan Craven (NAM)	Team Europcar	+ 3' 21"
6	Bonaventure Uwizeyimana (RWA)	Rwanda	+ 3' 22"
7	Francisco Mancebo (ESP)	Skydive Dubai–Al Ahli	+ 3' 29"
8	Salah Eddine Mraouni (MAR)	Morocco	+ 4' 00"
9	Maarten de Jonge (NED)	Bike Aid	+ 4' 12"
10	Elyas Afewerki (ERI)	Eritrea	+ 4' 13"

=== Stage 7 ===
21 February 2015 — Port-Gentil to Port-Gentil, 116.6 km (72.5 mi)

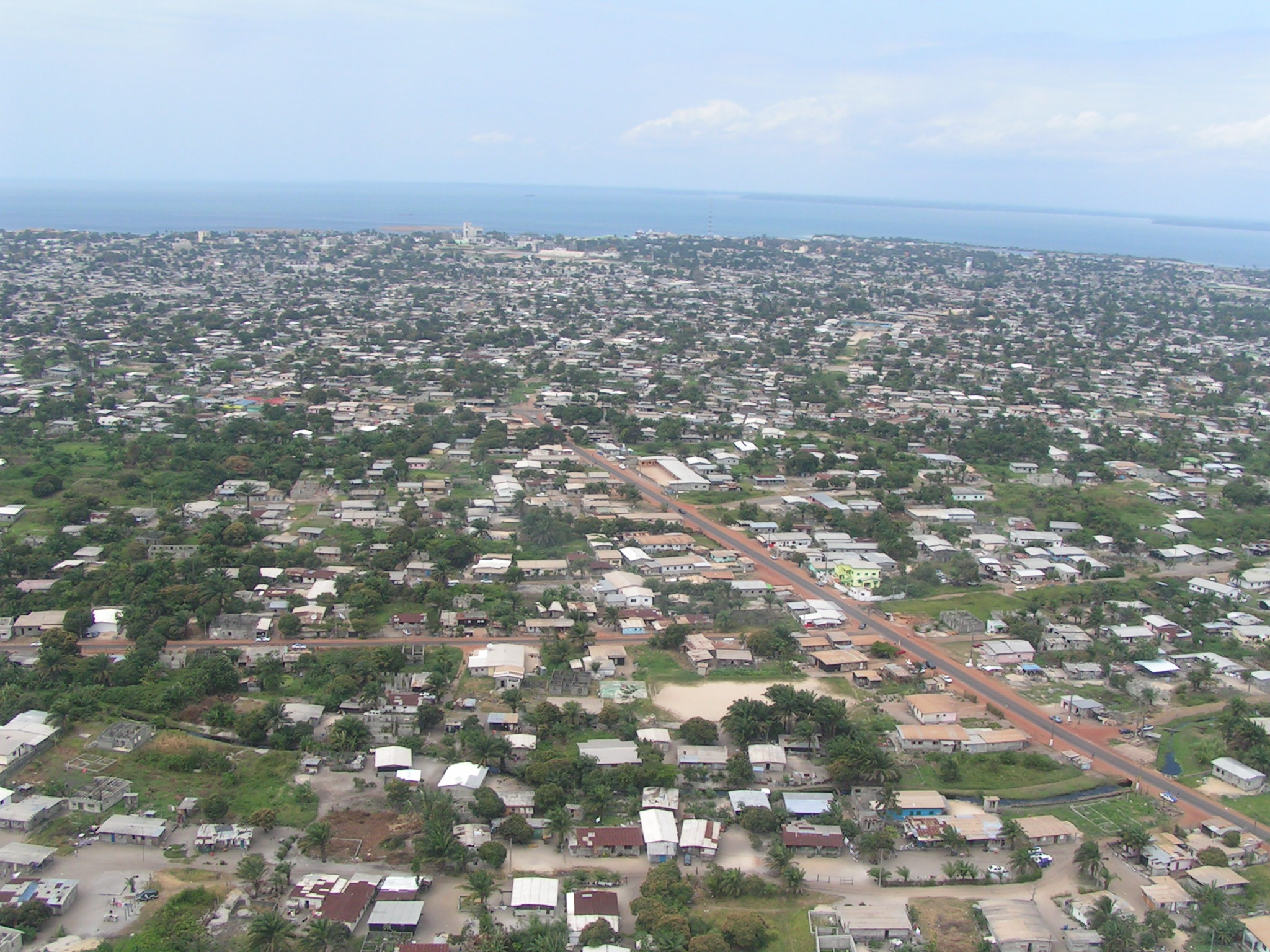
Port-Gentil, the location of stage 7

The seventh stage was held entirely in Port-Gentil, the economic centre of Gabon. It was 116.6 km (72 mi) in total, made up of eleven laps of a 10.6 km (6.6 mi) city-centre circuit. The route was almost entirely flat.

The stage was controlled throughout by Bretagne–Séché Environnement, who set a strong pace in support of Yauheni Hutarovich. In the sprint finish, Hutarovich opened his sprint with 300 m (980 ft) remaining and was easily able to overcome the other riders – headed by Andrea Palini (Skydive Dubai–Al Ahli) and Yohann Gène (Team Europcar) – to take his second victory of the race and the third for his team. Hutarovich raised his arms in celebration before the finish line and in doing so swerved dramatically. Palini claimed that he had been obstructed and that Hutarovich should be relegated, but the race jury disagreed and Hutarovich was awarded the stage win.

The overall lead of Rafaâ Chtioui of Skydive Dubai–Al Ahli was not threatened and he remained more than two minutes ahead of the field and highly likely to win the general classification the following day.

Stage 7 result
Rank	Rider	Team	Time
1	Yauheni Hutarovich (BLR)	Bretagne–Séché Environnement	2h 34' 08"
2	Andrea Palini (ITA)	Skydive Dubai–Al Ahli	+ 0"
3	Yohann Gène (FRA)	Team Europcar	+ 0"
4	Meron Teshome (ERI)	Eritrea	+ 0"
5	Nolan Hoffman (RSA)	South Africa	+ 0"
6	Morgan Lamoisson (FRA)	Team Europcar	+ 0"
7	Daniel McLay (GBR)	Bretagne–Séché Environnement	+ 0"
8	Edgar Pinto (POR)	Skydive Dubai–Al Ahli	+ 0"
9	Fréderique Robert (BEL)	Wanty–Groupe Gobert	+ 0"
10	Tim De Troyer (BEL)	Wanty–Groupe Gobert	+ 0"

General classification after stage 7
Rank	Rider	Team	Time
1	Rafaâ Chtioui (TUN)	Skydive Dubai–Al Ahli	20h 07' 22"
2	Giovanni Bernaudeau (FRA)	Team Europcar	+ 2' 23"
3	Abdelkader Belmokhtar (ALG)	Algeria	+ 2' 53"
4	Edgar Pinto (POR)	Skydive Dubai–Al Ahli	+ 3' 21"
5	Dan Craven (NAM)	Team Europcar	+ 3' 21"
6	Bonaventure Uwizeyimana (RWA)	Rwanda	+ 3' 22"
7	Francisco Mancebo (ESP)	Skydive Dubai–Al Ahli	+ 3' 29"
8	Salah Eddine Mraouni (MAR)	Morocco	+ 4' 00"
9	Anthony Delaplace (FRA)	Bretagne–Séché Environnement	+ 4' 10"
10	Elyas Afewerki (ERI)	Eritrea	+ 4' 11"

=== Stage 8 ===
22 February 2015 — Akanda to Libreville, 126.8 km (78.8 mi)

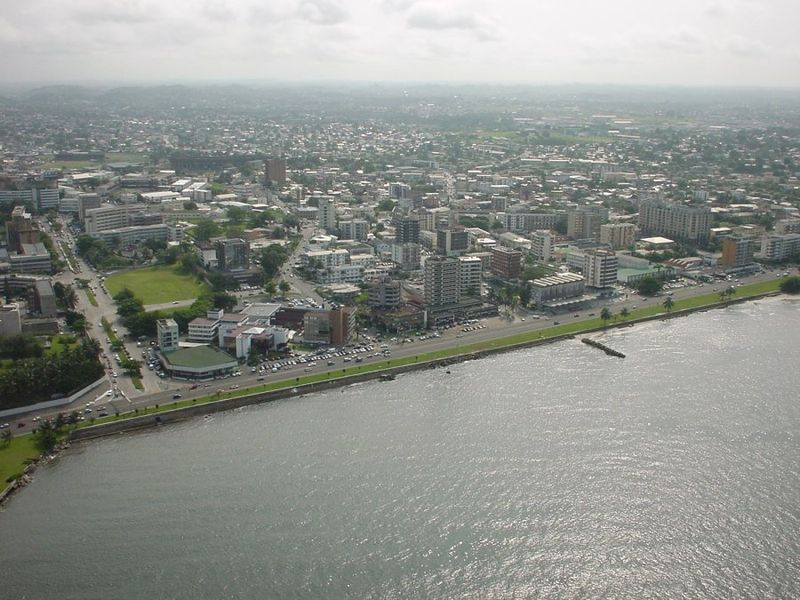
Libreville, venue of the finishing circuit of stage 8

The final stage of the 2015 La Tropicale Amissa Bongo was a 126.8 km (79 mi) route. It started at Cap Estérias on the outskirts of Libreville, running south along the coast to the city centre, where the riders entered a 5.8 km (3.6 mi) finishing circuit. After 15 laps of the circuit, they finished the race outside the Lycée National Léon M'Ba.

The first break was formed by Mohammed Errafai (Morocco) and Daniel Teklay (Eritrea). They were joined after 16 km (10 mi) of racing by Yannick Lontsi (Cameroon) and Iboudo Harouna (Burkina Faso). The stage was controlled by Rafaâ Chtioui's Skydive Dubai–Al Ahli team, especially by Francisco Mancebo, despite a late ambitious attack by Team Europcar. Once again, the stage finished in a bunch sprint and, once again, Bretagne–Séché Environnement were dominant. Yauheni Hutarovich won his third stage of the week, with his team mate and lead-out rider Daniel McLay able to take second place on the stage. Morgan Lamoisson (Team Europcar) took third place in the sprint.

Chtioui finished in a group 13 seconds behind the leader, but this was did not make a significant difference to his overall lead and he was therefore able to take the overall victory in the race. The one significant change in the final stage was Giovanni Bernaudeau (Team Europcar) gaining enough mountain points to win the mountains classification.

The prizes were presented after the stage by President Ali Bongo Ondimba and several other members of the Gabonese government. Several famous figures from European cycling were also present, including Laurent Jalabert, Bernard Hinault and Jean-Marie Leblanc, formerly the director of the Tour de France.

Stage 8 result
Rank	Rider	Team	Time
1	Yauheni Hutarovich (BLR)	Bretagne–Séché Environnement	2h 54' 33"
2	Daniel McLay (GBR)	Bretagne–Séché Environnement	+ 0"
3	Morgan Lamoisson (FRA)	Team Europcar	+ 0"
4	Andrea Palini (ITA)	Skydive Dubai–Al Ahli	+ 0"
5	Yohann Gène (FRA)	Team Europcar	+ 0"
6	Mekseb Debesay (ERI)	Bike Aid	+ 0"
7	Alberto Cecchin (ITA)	Roth–Škoda	+ 0"
8	Tim De Troyer (BEL)	Wanty–Groupe Gobert	+ 0"
9	Salah Eddine Mraouni (MAR)	Morocco	+ 0"
10	Nolan Hoffman (RSA)	South Africa	+ 0"

Final general classification
Rank	Rider	Team	Time
1	Rafaâ Chtioui (TUN)	Skydive Dubai–Al Ahli	23h 02' 08"
2	Giovanni Bernaudeau (FRA)	Team Europcar	+ 2' 07"
3	Abdelkader Belmokhtar (ALG)	Algeria	+ 2' 39"
4	Dan Craven (NAM)	Team Europcar	+ 3' 06"
5	Edgar Pinto (POR)	Skydive Dubai–Al Ahli	+ 3' 08"
6	Bonaventure Uwizeyimana (RWA)	Rwanda	+ 3' 09"
7	Francisco Mancebo (ESP)	Skydive Dubai–Al Ahli	+ 3' 16"
8	Salah Eddine Mraouni (MAR)	Morocco	+ 3' 47"
9	Anthony Delaplace (FRA)	Bretagne–Séché Environnement	+ 3' 57"
10	Elyas Afewerki (ERI)	Eritrea	+ 3' 58"

== Classifications ==
There were twelve classifications in the 2015 La Tropicale Amissa Bongo. The leader of each competition was awarded a jersey after each stage to denote their leadership of that classification, which they wore in subsequent stages.

The first and most important classification was the general classification. This was calculated by adding together the times of each rider cumulatively across the eight stages (though the stage 6 team time trial was ultimately excluded), before applying time bonuses. Time bonuses were awarded for the first, second and third placed riders on each stage (10, 6 and 4 seconds respectively) and for the first, second and third placed riders at each intermediate sprint (3, 2 and 1 seconds respectively). The winner of this classification was awarded a yellow jersey and was considered the overall winner of the race.

The points classification was calculated by awarding points to the top 20 riders on each road stage (i.e. excluding the team time trial). The rider with the most points after the race was the winner of the classification and was awarded a pink jersey.

The mountains classification was calculated based on the classified climbs on the road stages. Every climb of the race was classified as a fourth-category climb, all carrying the same number of points: 5, 3 and 1 points to the first three riders to the summit. The winner of this classification was awarded a green jersey with white polka dots.

The first rider in the general classification who was born after 1 January 1992 was considered the winner of the young riders classification. The prize for this competition was a white and blue jersey.

The teams classification was calculated by taking the best three riders on each team on each stage and adding their times together. The team with the lowest cumulative time over the seven road stages plus the team's time in the team time trial (though this was eventually excluded from the calculation) was the winner of the classification. The leading team was awarded white casquettes after each stage and was awarded green and white jerseys after the seventh and eighth stages, though these jerseys were not worn during racing.

There were also six minor classifications. The rider who had scored most points at intermediate sprints was awarded a blue jersey with white polka dots. The best rider on one of the African national teams was awarded a green jersey and the best rider on the Gabonese national team was awarded a blue jersey. The best African team was awarded a beige jersey, though again these were not worn during racing. There was a combativity classification. After each stage, the rider who had made most effort and demonstrated good sportsmanship during each stage was awarded points, and the rider with the most points at the end of the race was awarded a yellow and green jersey. Finally, there was a jersey awarded each day for the Gabonese rider who had been in the longest breakaway; the longest breakaway by a Gabonese rider in the whole race was awarded the jersey after the final stage. This jersey was blue and white, in the Gabonese national colours.

There was also an orange jersey awarded to the winner of each stage, to be worn in the following day's stage.

=== Major classifications leadership table ===
Stage	Winner	General classification	Points classification	Young rider classification	Mountains classification	Teams classification
1	Rafaâ Chtioui	Rafaâ Chtioui	Rafaâ Chtioui	Bonaventure Uwizeyimana	Abdelkader Belmokhtar	Skydive Dubai–Al Ahli
2	Rafaâ Chtioui	Rafaâ Chtioui	Rafaâ Chtioui	Bonaventure Uwizeyimana	Abdelkader Belmokhtar	Skydive Dubai–Al Ahli
3	Daniel McLay	Rafaâ Chtioui	Rafaâ Chtioui	Bonaventure Uwizeyimana	Abdelkader Belmokhtar	Skydive Dubai–Al Ahli
4	Andrea Palini	Rafaâ Chtioui	Yohann Gène	Bonaventure Uwizeyimana	Tesfom Okubamariam	Skydive Dubai–Al Ahli
5	Yauheni Hutarovich	Rafaâ Chtioui	Yohann Gène	Bonaventure Uwizeyimana	Tesfom Okubamariam	Skydive Dubai–Al Ahli
6	Morocco	Rafaâ Chtioui	Yohann Gène	Bonaventure Uwizeyimana	Tesfom Okubamariam	Skydive Dubai–Al Ahli
7	Yauheni Hutarovich	Rafaâ Chtioui	Yohann Gène	Bonaventure Uwizeyimana	Tesfom Okubamariam	Skydive Dubai–Al Ahli
8	Yauheni Hutarovich	Rafaâ Chtioui	Yohann Gène	Bonaventure Uwizeyimana	Giovanni Bernaudeau	Skydive Dubai–Al Ahli
Final		Rafaâ Chtioui	Yohann Gène	Bonaventure Uwizeyimana	Giovanni Bernaudeau	Skydive Dubai–Al Ahli

=== Minor classifications winners ===
Classification	Winner	Team
Best African rider	Abdelkader Belmokhtar	Algeria
Best Gabonese rider	Cédric Tchouta	Gabon
Intermediate sprints	Essaïd Abelouache	Morocco
Combativity	Mohammed Errafai	Morocco
Longest Gabonese breakaway	Lérys Moukagni	Gabon
Best African team		Rwanda
