= 2014 Team Europcar season =

Team Europcar
- 2014 season
- Manager: Jean-René Bernaudeau

Season victories
- One-day races: 3
- Stage race overall: 1
- Stage race stages: 7
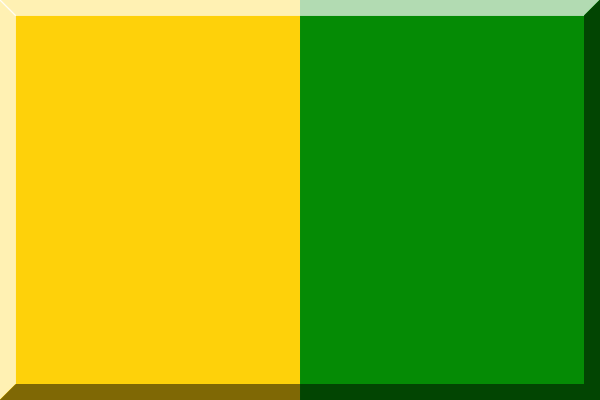
- Jersey

The 2014 season for the Team Europcar cycling team began in January with La Tropicale Amissa Bongo.

== Team roster ==
As of 1 January 2014.

Rider	Date of birth
Yukiya Arashiro (JPN)	22 September 1984 (aged 29)
Natnael Berhane (ERI)	5 January 1991 (aged 22)
Giovanni Bernaudeau (FRA)	25 August 1983 (aged 30)
Bryan Coquard (FRA)	25 April 1992 (aged 21)
Jérôme Cousin (FRA)	5 June 1989 (aged 24)
Dan Craven (Note: Craven joined the team on 1 June.) (NAM)	1 February 1983 (aged 30)
Antoine Duchesne (CAN)	12 September 1991 (aged 22)
Jimmy Engoulvent (FRA)	7 December 1979 (aged 34)
Cyril Gautier (FRA)	26 September 1987 (aged 26)
Yohann Gène (FRA)	25 June 1981 (aged 32)
Romain Guillemois (FRA)	28 March 1991 (aged 22)
Tony Hurel (FRA)	1 November 1987 (aged 26)
Fabrice Jeandesboz (FRA)	4 December 1984 (aged 29)
Vincent Jérôme (FRA)	26 November 1984 (aged 29)

Rider	Date of birth
Christophe Kern (FRA)	18 January 1981 (aged 32)
Morgan Lamoisson (FRA)	7 September 1988 (aged 25)
Davide Malacarne (ITA)	11 July 1987 (aged 26)
Yannick Martinez (FRA)	4 May 1988 (aged 25)
Maxime Méderel (FRA)	19 September 1980 (aged 33)
Bryan Nauleau (FRA)	17 March 1988 (aged 25)
Alexandre Pichot (FRA)	6 January 1983 (aged 30)
Perrig Quéméneur (FRA)	26 April 1984 (aged 29)
Kévin Reza (FRA)	18 May 1988 (aged 25)
Pierre Rolland (FRA)	10 October 1986 (aged 27)
Romain Sicard (FRA)	1 January 1988 (aged 26)
Björn Thurau (GER)	23 July 1988 (aged 25)
Angelo Tulik (FRA)	2 December 1990 (aged 23)
Thomas Voeckler (FRA)	22 June 1979 (aged 34)

Riders who joined the team for the 2014 season

Rider	2013 team
Antoine Duchesne	neo-pro (Bontrager Cycling Team)
Jimmy Engoulvent	Sojasun
Romain Guillemois	neo-pro (Vendée U)
Fabrice Jeandesboz	Sojasun
Yannick Martinez	neo-pro (La Pomme Marseille)
Maxime Méderel	Sojasun
Romain Sicard	Euskaltel–Euskadi

Riders who left the team during or after the 2013 season

Rider	2014 team
Franck Bouyer	Retired
Anthony Charteau	Retired
Sébastien Chavanel	FDJ.fr
Damien Gaudin	Ag2r–La Mondiale
Sébastien Turgot	Ag2r–La Mondiale
David Veilleux	Retired

== Season victories ==
Date	Race	Competition	Rider	Country	Location
19 January	La Tropicale Amissa Bongo, Overall	UCI Africa Tour	Natnael Berhane (ERI)	Gabon	
19 January	La Tropicale Amissa Bongo, Sprints classification	UCI Africa Tour	Natnael Berhane (ERI)	Gabon	
19 January	La Tropicale Amissa Bongo, Teams classification	UCI Africa Tour	(Note: The riders on the squad were Yohann Gène, Natnael Berhane, Giovanni Bernaudeau, Romain Guillemois, Fabrice Jeandesboz and Bryan Nauleau)	Gabon	
7 February	Étoile de Bessèges, Stage 3	UCI Europe Tour	Bryan Coquard (FRA)	France	Bessèges
8 February	Étoile de Bessèges, Stage 4	UCI Europe Tour	Bryan Coquard (FRA)	France	Laudun
4 April	Route Adélie	UCI Europe Tour	Bryan Coquard (FRA)	France	Vitré
15 April	Paris–Camembert	UCI Europe Tour	Bryan Coquard (FRA)	France	Vimoutiers
27 April	La Roue Tourangelle	UCI Europe Tour	Angelo Tulik (FRA)	France	Tours
11 May	Four Days of Dunkirk, Stage 5	UCI Europe Tour	Jimmy Engoulvent (FRA)	France	Dunkirk
16 May	Tour de Picardie, Stage 1	UCI Europe Tour	Bryan Coquard (FRA)	France	Estrées-Saint-Denis
5 June	Boucles de la Mayenne, Prologue	UCI Europe Tour	Jimmy Engoulvent (FRA)	France	Laval
8 June	Boucles de la Mayenne, Stage 3	UCI Europe Tour	Yohann Gène (FRA)	France	Laval
22 June	Tour de Suisse, Mountains classification	UCI World Tour	Björn Thurau (GER)	Switzerland	
20 August	Tour du Limousin, Stage 2	UCI Europe Tour	Cyril Gautier (FRA)	France	Grèzes
22 August	Tour du Limousin, Combativity classification	UCI Europe Tour	Christophe Kern (FRA)	France	
22 August	Tour du Limousin, Teams classification	UCI Europe Tour	(Note: The riders on the squad were Giovanni Bernaudeau, Cyril Gautier, Yukiya Arashiro, Perrig Quéméneur, Kévin Reza, Christophe Kern, Angelo Tulik and Thomas Voeckler)	France	
