= 2014 UCI Road World Championships – Men's road race =

Men's road race
2014 UCI Road World Championships
- Rainbow jersey

Race details
- Dates: 28 September 2014
- Stages: 1
- Distance: 254.80 km (158.33 mi)
- Winning time: 6h 29' 07"

Medalists
| | Gold | Michał Kwiatkowski (POL) |
| | Silver | Simon Gerrans (AUS) |
| | Bronze | Alejandro Valverde (ESP) |

The Men's road race of the 2014 UCI Road World Championships was a cycling event that took place on 28 September 2014 in Ponferrada, Spain. It was the 81st edition of the championship, and Portugal's Rui Costa was the defending champion.

After attacking with around 6 km (3.7 mi) remaining, Poland's Michał Kwiatkowski held off the rest of the field to become his country's first world road race champion. Kwiatkowski held on by a second to beat Australia's Simon Gerrans, while Spain's Alejandro Valverde finished in third place for the third successive world championships.

== Qualification ==
Qualification was based on performances on the UCI run tours during 2014. Results from January to the middle of August counted towards the qualification criteria on both the 2014 UCI World Tour and the UCI Continental Circuits across the world, with the rankings being determined upon the release of the numerous tour rankings on 15 August 2014.

The following 48 nations qualified.

| Number of riders | Nations |
|---|---|
| 14 to enter, 9 to start | Australia, Belgium, Colombia, France, Germany, Great Britain, Italy, Netherlands, Poland, Spain |
| 9 to enter, 6 to start | Austria, Denmark, Iran, Morocco, Portugal, Russia, Slovenia, Ukraine, United States, Venezuela |
| 5 to enter, 3 to start | Algeria, Argentina, Belarus, Brazil, Canada, Costa Rica, Croatia, Czech Republic, Eritrea, Estonia, Ireland, Japan, Kazakhstan, Latvia, Lithuania, Luxembourg, New Zealand, Norway, Romania, Slovakia, South Africa, South Korea, Switzerland |
| 2 to enter, 1 to start | Bulgaria, Ecuador, Greece, Serbia, Sweden |

== Course ==
The race was held on the same circuit as the other road races and consisted of 14 laps. The circuit was 18.20 km (11.31 mi) long and included two hills. The total climbing was 306 m (1,004 ft) per lap and the maximum incline was 10.7%.

The first 4 km (2.5 mi) were flat, after which the climb to Alto de Montearenas started, with an average gradient of 8%. After a few hundred metres the ascent flattened and the remaining 5.1 km (3.2 mi) were at an average gradient of 3.5%. Next was a descent, with the steepest point after 11 km (6.8 mi) at a 16% negative gradient.

The Alto de Compostilla was a short climb of 1.1 km (0.68 mi), at an average gradient is 6.5% with some of the steepest parts at 11%. The remaining distance of 4.5 km (2.8 mi) was downhill thereafter, prior to the finish in Ponferrada.

== Schedule ==
All times are in Central European Time (UTC+1).

| Date | Time | Event |
|---|---|---|
| 28 September 2014 | 10:00–16:35 | Men's road race |
| 28 September 2014 | 16:55 | Victory ceremony |

== Participating nations ==
204 cyclists from 44 nations started the men's road race. The numbers of cyclists per nation are shown in parentheses.

- Algeria (1)
- Argentina (3)
- Australia (9)
- Austria (6)
- Belgium (9)
- Belarus (3)
- Brazil (3)
- Canada (3)
- Colombia (9)
- Costa Rica (2)
- Croatia (3)
- Czech Republic (3)
- Denmark (6)
- Ecuador (1)
- Eritrea (2)
- Estonia (3)
- France (9)
- (United Kingdom) Great Britain (9)
- Germany (9)
- Greece (1)
- (Republic of Ireland) Ireland (3)
- Italy (9)
- Japan (3)
- Kazakhstan (3)
- Latvia (3)
- Lithuania (3)
- Luxembourg (1)
- Morocco (5)
- Netherlands (9)
- New Zealand (3)
- Norway (3)
- Poland (9)
- Portugal (6)
- Romania (3)
- Russia (6)
- Slovakia (3)
- Slovenia (6)
- South Africa (3)
- Spain (9) (host)
- Sweden (1)
- Switzerland (3)
- Ukraine (6)
- United States (6)
- Venezuela (4)

== Prize money ==
The UCI assigned premiums for the top 3 finishers, with a total prize money of €16,101.

| Position | 1st | 2nd | 3rd | Total |
| Amount | €7,667 | €5,367 | €3,067 | €16,101 |

== Results ==
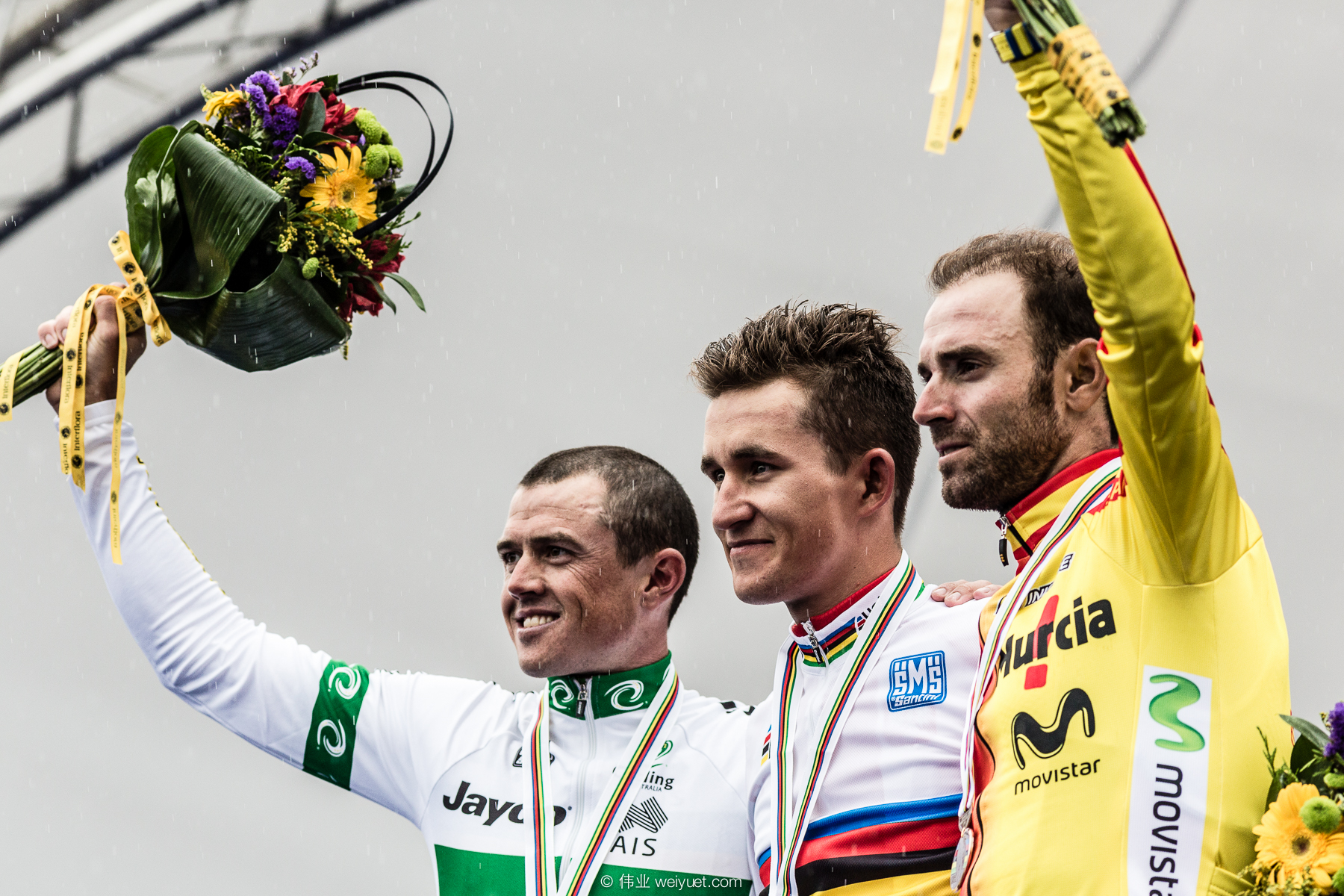
Medalists after the race.

=== Final classification ===
Of the race's 204 entrants, 95 riders completed the full distance of 254.8 km (158.3 mi).

| Rank | Rider | Country | Time |
|---|---|---|---|
| 1 | Michał Kwiatkowski | Poland | 6h 29' 07" |
| 2 | Simon Gerrans | Australia | + 1" |
| 3 | Alejandro Valverde | Spain | + 1" |
| 4 | Matti Breschel | Denmark | + 1" |
| 5 | Greg Van Avermaet | Belgium | + 1" |
| 6 | Tony Gallopin | France | + 1" |
| 7 | Philippe Gilbert | Belgium | + 4" |
| 8 | Alexander Kristoff | Norway | + 7" |
| 9 | John Degenkolb | Germany | + 7" |
| 10 | Nacer Bouhanni | France | + 7" |
| 11 | Fabian Cancellara | Switzerland | + 7" |
| 12 | Ben Swift | Great Britain | + 7" |
| 13 | Sonny Colbrelli | Italy | + 7" |
| 14 | Michael Matthews | Australia | + 7" |
| 15 | Ramūnas Navardauskas | Lithuania | + 7" |
| 16 | Daryl Impey | South Africa | + 7" |
| 17 | Maciej Paterski | Poland | + 7" |
| 18 | Bauke Mollema | Netherlands | + 7" |
| 19 | Warren Barguil | France | + 7" |
| 20 | Michael Valgren | Denmark | + 7" |
| 21 | Daniele Bennati | Italy | + 7" |
| 22 | Tom Dumoulin | Netherlands | + 7" |
| 23 | Rui Costa | Portugal | + 7" |
| 24 | Jon Izagirre | Spain | + 7" |
| 25 | Brent Bookwalter | United States | + 7" |
| 26 | Nicolas Roche | Ireland | + 7" |
| 27 | Rigoberto Urán | Colombia | + 7" |
| 28 | Edvald Boasson Hagen | Norway | + 7" |
| 29 | Petr Vakoč | Czech Republic | + 14" |
| 30 | Alex Howes | United States | + 14" |
| 31 | Chris Anker Sørensen | Denmark | + 14" |
| 32 | Giovanni Visconti | Italy | + 14" |
| 33 | Joaquim Rodríguez | Spain | + 17" |
| 34 | Fabio Aru | Italy | + 17" |
| 35 | Yuri Trofimov | Russia | + 17" |
| 36 | Daniel Moreno | Spain | + 17" |
| 37 | Lars Petter Nordhaug | Norway | + 17" |
| 38 | Dominik Nerz | Germany | + 21" |
| 39 | Simon Geschke | Germany | + 24" |
| 40 | Vincenzo Nibali | Italy | + 27" |
| 41 | Giampaolo Caruso | Italy | + 31" |
| 42 | Grega Bole | Slovenia | + 38" |
| 43 | Peter Sagan | Slovakia | + 42" |
| 44 | Andriy Hryvko | Ukraine | + 50" |
| 45 | Alessandro De Marchi | Italy | + 1' 03" |
| 46 | Alexandr Kolobnev | Russia | + 1' 05" |
| 47 | Kristijan Đurasek | Croatia | + 1' 05" |
| 48 | Jan Bakelants | Belgium | + 1' 05" |

| Rank | Rider | Country | Time |
|---|---|---|---|
| 49 | Tom Boonen | Belgium | + 1' 05" |
| 50 | Sergey Chernetskiy | Russia | + 1' 05" |
| 51 | Jonathan Castroviejo | Spain | + 1' 05" |
| 52 | Ben Gastauer | Luxembourg | + 1' 05" |
| 53 | Matthias Brändle | Austria | + 1' 27" |
| 54 | Tiago Machado | Portugal | + 1' 32" |
| 55 | Simon Clarke | Australia | + 2' 10" |
| 56 | Ben Hermans | Belgium | + 2' 10" |
| 57 | Wout Poels | Netherlands | + 2' 19" |
| 58 | Michał Gołaś | Poland | + 2' 31" |
| 59 | Vasil Kiryienka | Belarus | + 2' 32" |
| 60 | Cyril Gautier | France | + 2' 36" |
| 61 | Jean-Christophe Péraud | France | + 2' 36" |
| 62 | Romain Bardet | France | + 2' 36" |
| 63 | Paul Martens | Germany | + 2' 39" |
| 64 | Sep Vanmarcke | Belgium | + 3' 42" |
| 65 | Imanol Erviti | Spain | + 4' 08" |
| 66 | Michael Albasini | Switzerland | + 5' 12" |
| 67 | Nelson Oliveira | Portugal | + 5' 12" |
| 68 | Georg Preidler | Austria | + 5' 12" |
| 69 | Danilo Wyss | Switzerland | + 5' 12" |
| 70 | Esteban Chaves | Colombia | + 5' 12" |
| 71 | Christopher Juul-Jensen | Denmark | + 5' 12" |
| 72 | Kristjan Fajt | Slovenia | + 6' 11" |
| 73 | Reinardt Janse van Rensburg | South Africa | + 6' 11" |
| 74 | Damiano Caruso | Italy | + 6' 11" |
| 75 | Ilnur Zakarin | Russia | + 6' 11" |
| 76 | Jonathan Monsalve | Venezuela | + 6' 11" |
| 77 | Sylvain Chavanel | France | + 6' 11" |
| 78 | Alexsandr Dyachenko | Kazakhstan | + 6' 11" |
| 79 | Jesús Herrada | Spain | + 6' 11" |
| 80 | Manuel Quinziato | Italy | + 6' 11" |
| 81 | Adam Hansen | Australia | + 6' 11" |
| 82 | Peter Kennaugh | Great Britain | + 6' 14" |
| 83 | Zdeněk Štybar | Czech Republic | + 7' 01" |
| 84 | Dan Martin | Ireland | + 8' 25" |
| 85 | Andrey Amador | Costa Rica | + 11' 59" |
| 86 | Jack Bauer | New Zealand | + 13' 43" |
| 87 | Peter Velits | Slovakia | + 13' 43" |
| 88 | Andrey Zeits | Kazakhstan | + 14' 53" |
| 89 | Johan Vansummeren | Belgium | + 14' 53" |
| 90 | Stef Clement | Netherlands | + 15' 23" |
| 91 | Jan Bárta | Czech Republic | + 15' 23" |
| 92 | Mykhaylo Kononenko | Ukraine | + 15' 23" |
| 93 | Andriy Khripta | Ukraine | + 15' 34" |
| 94 | Miyataka Shimizu | Japan | + 20' 22" |
| 95 | George Bennett | New Zealand | + 20' 22" |

=== Riders who failed to finish ===
109 riders failed to finish the race.

| Rider | Country |
|---|---|
| Jelle Vanendert | Belgium |
| Luis León Sánchez | Spain |
| Sérgio Paulinho | Portugal |
| Nicki Sørensen | Denmark |
| Tony Martin | Germany |
| Luke Rowe | Great Britain |
| Michael Mørkøv | Denmark |
| Daniel Navarro | Spain |
| Tim Wellens | Belgium |
| Mathew Hayman | Australia |
| Paweł Poljański | Poland |
| Cadel Evans | Australia |
| Andrei Solomennikov | Russia |
| Philip Deignan | Ireland |
| Steven Kruijswijk | Netherlands |
| Janier Acevedo | Colombia |
| Jacques Janse van Rensburg | South Africa |
| Ryan Anderson | Canada |
| Toms Skujiņš | Latvia |
| Rein Taaramäe | Estonia |
| Luka Mezgec | Slovenia |
| Winner Anacona | Colombia |
| Yukiya Arashiro | Japan |
| Rory Sutherland | Australia |
| Wilco Kelderman | Netherlands |
| Simon Yates | Great Britain |
| Emanuel Kišerlovski | Croatia |
| Geoffrey Soupe | France |
| Juan Carlos Rojas | Costa Rica |
| Patrick Konrad | Austria |
| Kévin Reza | France |
| Martin Velits | Slovakia |
| Eduardo Sepúlveda | Argentina |
| Carlos Quintero | Colombia |
| Bartosz Huzarski | Poland |
| Oleksandr Polivoda | Ukraine |
| Kristijan Koren | Slovenia |

| Rider | Country |
|---|---|
| Tom-Jelte Slagter | Netherlands |
| Žydrūnas Savickas | Lithuania |
| Julián Arredondo | Colombia |
| Matija Kvasina | Croatia |
| Jan Polanc | Slovenia |
| Aleksejs Saramotins | Latvia |
| Ignatas Konovalovas | Lithuania |
| Jure Kocjan | Slovenia |
| Greg Henderson | New Zealand |
| André Cardoso | Portugal |
| José Mendes | Portugal |
| Gatis Smukulis | Latvia |
| Roman Maikin | Russia |
| Michael Woods | Canada |
| Riccardo Zoidl | Austria |
| Tobias Ludvigsson | Sweden |
| Marco Haller | Austria |
| Murilo Fischer | Brazil |
| David Millar | Great Britain |
| Sebastián Henao | Colombia |
| Rafael Andriato | Brazil |
| Bernhard Eisel | Austria |
| Andrew Talansky | United States |
| Geraint Thomas | Great Britain |
| Kiel Reijnen | United States |
| Miguel Ángel Rubiano | Colombia |
| Eric Marcotte | United States |
| Daniil Fominykh | Kazakhstan |
| Cristian Egídio | Brazil |
| Paul Voss | Germany |
| Pieter Weening | Netherlands |
| Dylan van Baarle | Netherlands |
| Chris Froome | Great Britain |
| Kanstantsin Sivtsov | Belarus |
| Adam Yates | Great Britain |
| Heinrich Haussler | Australia |

| Rider | Country |
|---|---|
| Carlos Betancur | Colombia |
| Maximiliano Richeze | Argentina |
| Yukihiro Doi | Japan |
| Natnael Berhane | Eritrea |
| Dmytro Krivtsov | Ukraine |
| Andrei Nechita | Romania |
| Przemysław Niemiec | Poland |
| Michał Podlaski | Poland |
| Alo Jakin | Estonia |
| Bartłomiej Matysiak | Poland |
| Maciej Bodnar | Poland |
| Yauheni Hutarovich | Belarus |
| Mekseb Debesay | Eritrea |
| Gert Jõeäär | Estonia |
| Carlos Gálviz | Venezuela |
| Johannes Fröhlinger | Germany |
| Christian Knees | Germany |
| Tejay van Garderen | United States |
| Sergiy Lagkuti | Ukraine |
| André Greipel | Germany |
| Rohan Dennis | Australia |
| Serghei Tvetcov | Romania |
| Steve Cummings | Great Britain |
| Carlos José Ochoa | Venezuela |
| Azzedine Lagab | Algeria |
| Segundo Navarrete | Ecuador |
| Errafai Mohammed Amine | Morocco |
| Lucas Gaday | Argentina |
| Tarik Chaoufi | Morocco |
| Georgios Bouglas | Greece |
| Abdelatif Saadoune | Morocco |
| Oleg Berdos | Romania |
| Xavier Quevedo | Venezuela |
| Mouhssine Lahsaini | Morocco |
| Christian Meier | Canada |
| Essaïd Abelouache | Morocco |
