= 2010 La Tropicale Amissa Bongo =

Race details
- Dates: January 19 – January 24
- Stages: 6
- Distance: 719 km (446.8 mi)
- Winning time: 17h 48' 52"

Results
	Winner	Anthony Charteau (FRA)	(Bbox Bouygues Telecom)
	Second	Ian McLeod (RSA)	(MTN)
	Third	Julien Loubet (FRA)	(Ag2r–La Mondiale)

The 2010 La Tropicale Amissa Bongo took place from January 19 to 24. It was the fifth edition of the La Tropicale Amissa Bongo. This edition of the race consisted of six stages.

== Stages ==
Stage	Date	Start	Finish	Distance	Stage Top 3
1	19 January	Bongoville	Akieni	81 km	Samuel Dumoulin (FRA); Giovanni Bernaudeau (FRA); Christof Van Heerden (RSA)
2	20 January	Kabala	Franceville	125 km	Julien Loubet (FRA); David Moncoutié (FRA); Anthony Charteau (FRA)
3	21 January	Ngouoni	Moanda	101 km	Nicolas Rousseau (FRA); Amaël Moinard (FRA); Ian McLeod (RSA)
4	22 January	Ndjole	Lambaréné	133 km	Anthony Charteau (FRA); Ian McLeod (RSA); Julien Loubet (FRA)
5	23 January	Lambaréné	Kango	149 km	Yohann Gène (FRA); Giovanni Bernaudeau (FRA); Nicolas Rousseau (FRA)
6	24 January	Owendo	Libreville	130 km	Michael Reihs (DEN); Guillaume Blot (FRA); Guillaume Bonnafond (FRA)
