= Cycling South Africa =

National governing body of cycle racing in South Africa

- Sport: Cycling
- Abbreviation: CSA
- Affiliation: UCI
- Regional affiliation: African Cycling Federation
- Headquarters: Cape Town
- Location: 3rd Floor, Skyscape Terraces, DJ Wood Way, Bellville Business Park 7535
- President: Ciska du Plessis-Austin
- Secretary: Elton Davids

Official website
- www.cyclingsa.com
- (South Africa)

Cycling South Africa or Cycling SA is the national governing body of cycle racing in South Africa. Cycling SA is a member of the Confédération Africaine de Cyclisme and the Union Cycliste Internationale (UCI). It is affiliated to the South African Sports Confederation and Olympic Committee (SASCOC), as well as the Department of Sport and Recreation SA. Cycling South Africa regulates the five major disciplines within the sport, both amateur and professional, which include: road cycling, mountain biking, BMX biking, track cycling and para-cycling.
