= Cameroon Cycling Federation =

National governing body of cycle racing in Cameroon

The Cameroon Cycling Federation or FÉCACyclisme (in French: Fédération Camerounaise de Cyclisme) is the national governing body of cycle racing in Cameroon. FÉCACyclisme was founded on 29 September 1959. FÉCACyclisme is a member of the Confédération Africaine de Cyclisme.

The Cameroon Cycling Federation sponsor the annual Grand Prix Chantal Biya race, part of the UCI Africa Tour.
