= Mohammed Errafai =

Moroccan bicycle racer

Personal information
- Full name: Mohammed Amine Errafai
- Born: 8 February 1989 (age 37) Taza, Morocco

Cycling career
- Sport: Cycling
- Discipline: Road
- Role: Rider

Mohammed Amine Errafai (born 8 February 1989) is a Moroccan road cyclist. Born in the city of Taza, he started cycling in 2010 and he won many races in his region, he shine as a great and stronger cyclist in 2013/2014 when he moved to another club named "WAF" where he won multiple national races before he has been chosen to participate with the 3rd National Team in the 2014 Tour du Maroc.

In the 2014 National Championship Time Trial he finished in the 3rd place and in the National Road Championship he finished 13th.

Because of his great results, the Royal Moroccan Federation of Cycling chose him to participate with the 1st National Team at the 2014 UCI Road World Championships.

== Major results ==
2014
3rd Time trial, National Road Championships
Challenge du Prince

3rd Trophée de la Maison Royale
6th Trophée de l'Anniversaire
6th Trophée Princier

2015
La Tropicale Amissa Bongo

1st Combativity classification
1st Stage 6 (TTT)

2nd Overall Tour du Faso

1st Stage 2

2nd Grand Prix de Ben Guerir, Challenge des phosphates
Les Challenges de la Marche Verte

4th GP Al Massira
6th GP Oued Eddahab

Challenge du Prince

6th Trophée de l'Anniversaire
7th Trophée de la Maison Royale
8th Trophée Princier

7th Overall Grand Prix Chantal Biya
9th Overall Tour de Côte d'Ivoire
2016
1st Overall Tour du Cameroun

1st Stage 1

3rd Team time trial, African Road Championships
Challenge du Prince

6th Trophée de l'Anniversaire
7th Trophée de la Maison Royale
