= Maarten de Jonge =

Dutch cyclist

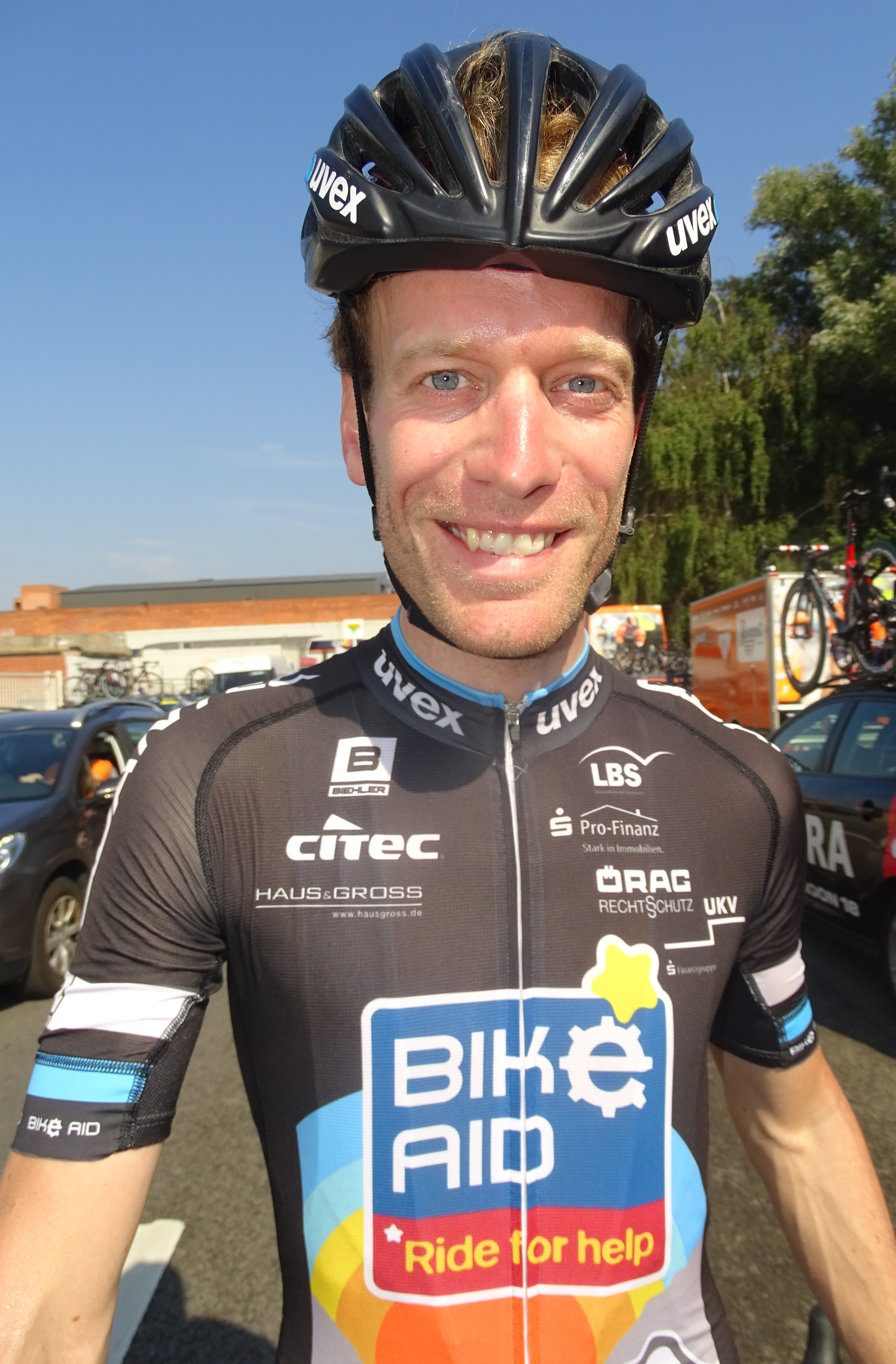
- De Jonge in 2015

Personal information
- Full name: Maarten de Jonge
- Born: 9 March 1985 (age 41) Oldenzaal, Netherlands
- Height: 1.82 m (6 ft 0 in)
- Weight: 65 kg (143 lb)

Cycling career
- Sport: Cycling
- Current team: Retired
- Discipline: Road
- Role: Rider

Amateur team
- 2008–2009: Beveren 2000

Professional teams
- 2004: Team Fuji Bikes
- 2007: Time-van Hemert
- 2009: Skil–Shimano (stagiaire)
- 2010: Cycling Team Jo Piels
- 2011: Endura Racing
- 2012: Team Raiko–Stölting
- 2013: Team Vorarlberg
- 2014: Terengganu Cycling Team
- 2015: Bike Aid
- 2016: Team Lvshan Landscape
- 2017–2020: Monkey Town Continental Team

Maarten de Jonge also known by his nickname ‘El Tigre Del Norte’ (born 9 March 1985) is a Dutch former professional cyclist, who rode professionally for ten teams during his career. He claims to have attempted to fly on both Malaysia Airlines Flight 370 and Malaysia Airlines Flight 17, but changed flights in order to save money.

It has never been independently confirmed that de Jonge ever booked tickets for either flight. According to Slate, de Jonge only mentioned he wanted to fly on the day MH17 crashed, but he never mentioned that he booked a ticket for that flight. Slate also mentioned that there was no reason for de Jonge to book a flight on MH370.

== Major results ==
2008
3rd Internationale Wielertrofee Jong Maar Moedig
5th Overall Tour des Pyrénées
2010
3rd Overall Flèche du Sud
2011
8th Neuseen Classics
2012
4th Overall Tour de Serbie
2014
1st Stage 4 Tour of Thailand
