= Yohann Gène =

French bicycle racer

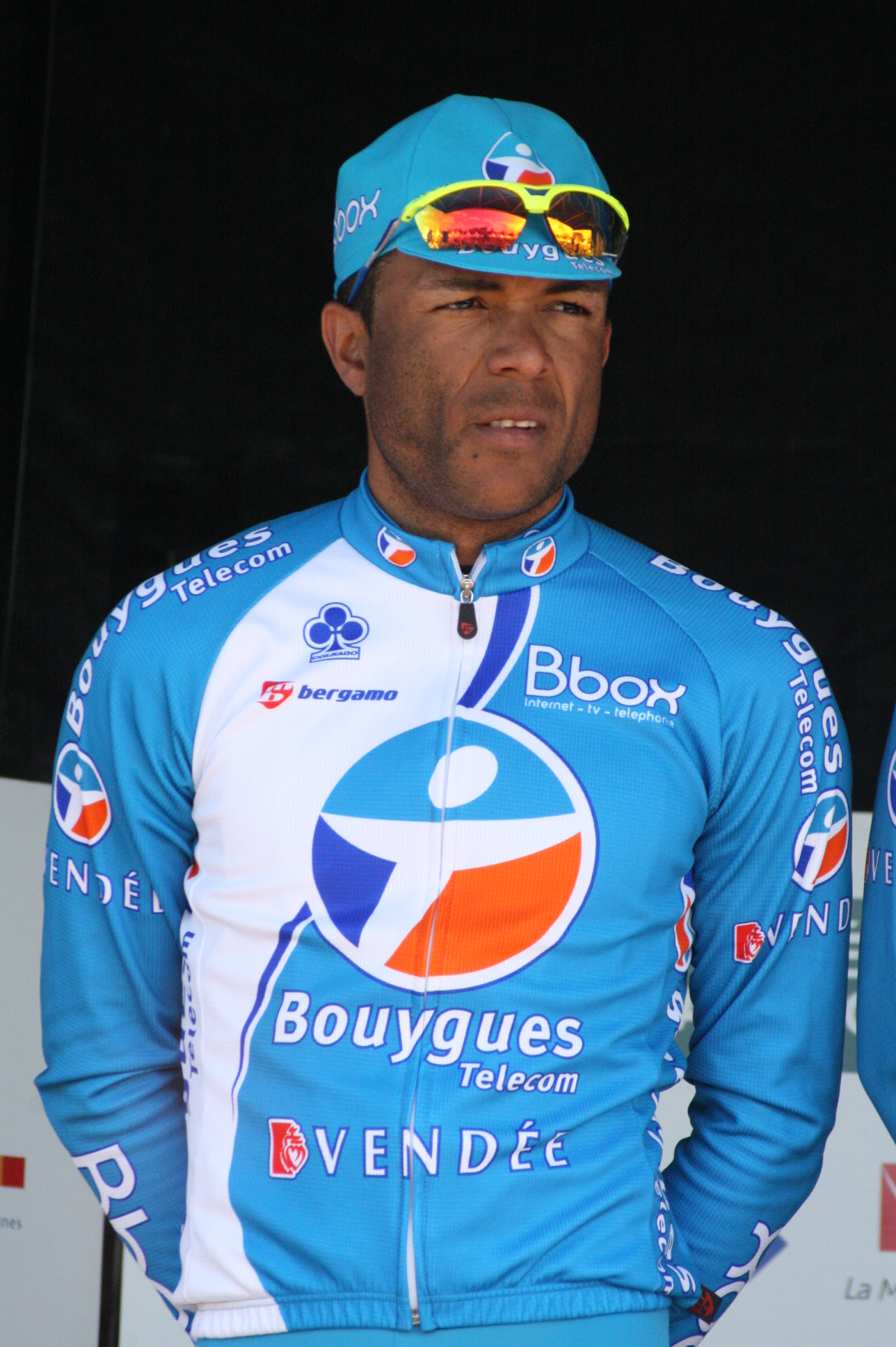
- Gène at the 2010 Four Days of Dunkirk

Personal information
- Full name: Yohann Gène
- Born: 25 June 1981 (age 45) Pointe-à-Pitre, Guadeloupe
- Height: 1.75 m (5 ft 9 in)
- Weight: 67 kg (148 lb)

Cycling career
- Sport: Cycling
- Current team: Retired
- Discipline: Road
- Role: Rider
- Rider type: Sprinter

Amateur teams
- 2000–2004: Vendée U–Pays de la Loire
- 2003: Brioches La Boulangère (stagiaire)
- 2004: Brioches La Boulangère (stagiaire)

Professional team
- 2005–2019: Bouygues Télécom

Yohann Gène (born 25 June 1981 in Pointe-à-Pitre, Guadeloupe) is a French former professional road bicycle racer, who competed professionally between 2005 and 2019, entirely for Bouygues Télécom and its later iterations.

== Major results ==
2003
2nd La Côte Picarde
9th Overall Tour de la Somme
2004
6th Grand Prix des Marbriers
2007
5th Grand Prix de la Somme
2009
1st Stage 7 Tour de Langkawi
2010
2nd Val d'Ille Classic
5th Overall La Tropicale Amissa Bongo

1st Stage 5

2011
1st Stage 3 Tour of South Africa
7th Boucles de l'Aulne
9th Overall La Tropicale Amissa Bongo

1st Stages 2 & 5

2012
3rd Châteauroux Classic
5th Overall La Tropicale Amissa Bongo

1st Points classification
1st Stages 1 & 5

10th Tallinn–Tartu GP
2013
1st Overall La Tropicale Amissa Bongo

1st Points classification
1st Stage 6

1st Stage 2 Route du Sud
2014
1st Stage 3 Boucles de la Mayenne
7th Grand Prix de Fourmies
2015
1st Points classification La Tropicale Amissa Bongo
2016
6th Tro-Bro Léon
2017
1st Overall La Tropicale Amissa Bongo

1st Stage 5

=== Grand Tour general classification results timeline ===
| Grand Tour | 2005 | 2006 | 2007 | 2008 | 2009 | 2010 | 2011 | 2012 | 2013 | 2014 | 2015 | 2016 | 2017 |
|---|---|---|---|---|---|---|---|---|---|---|---|---|---|
| Giro d'Italia | — | 149 | DNF | — | DNF | — | — | — | — | — | — | — | — |
| Tour de France | — | — | — | — | — | — | 158 | 139 | 158 | 128 | 137 | 158 | 134 |
| Vuelta a España | 126 | — | — | — | — | — | — | — | — | — | — | — | — |
