= Perrig Quéméneur =

French road bicycle racer

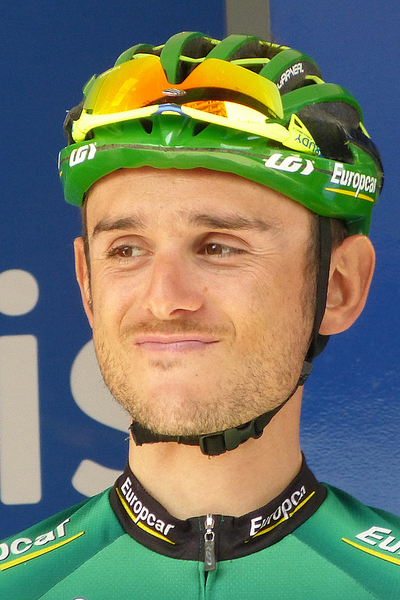
- Quéméneur at the 2013 Four Days of Dunkirk

Personal information
- Full name: Perrig Quéméneur
- Born: 26 April 1984 (age 42) Landerneau, France
- Height: 1.81 m (5 ft 11 in)
- Weight: 67 kg (148 lb; 10.6 st)

Cycling career
- Sport: Cycling
- Current team: Retired
- Discipline: Road
- Role: Rider

Amateur teams
- 2003: VS Lesnevien
- 2004–2007: Vendée U–Pays de la Loire
- 2007: Bouygues Télécom (stagiaire)

Professional team
- 2008–2019: Bouygues Télécom

Perrig Quéméneur (born 26 April 1984 in Landerneau) is a French former road bicycle racer from Brittany, who rode professionally between 2008 and 2019, entirely for the Bouygues Télécom team and its later iterations.

== Major results ==
2006
3rd Overall Tour du Haut-Anjou
2007
1st Grand Prix de la ville de Buxerolles
4th Overall Tour de Bretagne
10th Overall Tour du Limousin
10th Overall Tour des Pyrénées
2010
8th Tro-Bro Léon
2011
4th Overall Tour of South Africa
4th Overall Tour du Gévaudan Languedoc-Roussillon
5th Overall Rhône-Alpes Isère Tour
7th Tour de Vendée
Combativity award Stage 1 Tour de France
2015
Combativity award Stage 6 Tour de France
2017
6th Overall Rhône-Alpes Isère Tour

=== Grand Tour general classification results timeline ===
Grand Tour	2010	2011	2012	2013	2014	2015	2016	2017
Giro d'Italia	—	—	—	—	80	—	—	—
Tour de France	—	151	—	—	83	74	—	106
Vuelta a España	100	—	—	—	—	—	74	—
