= Kévin Reza =

French racing cyclist

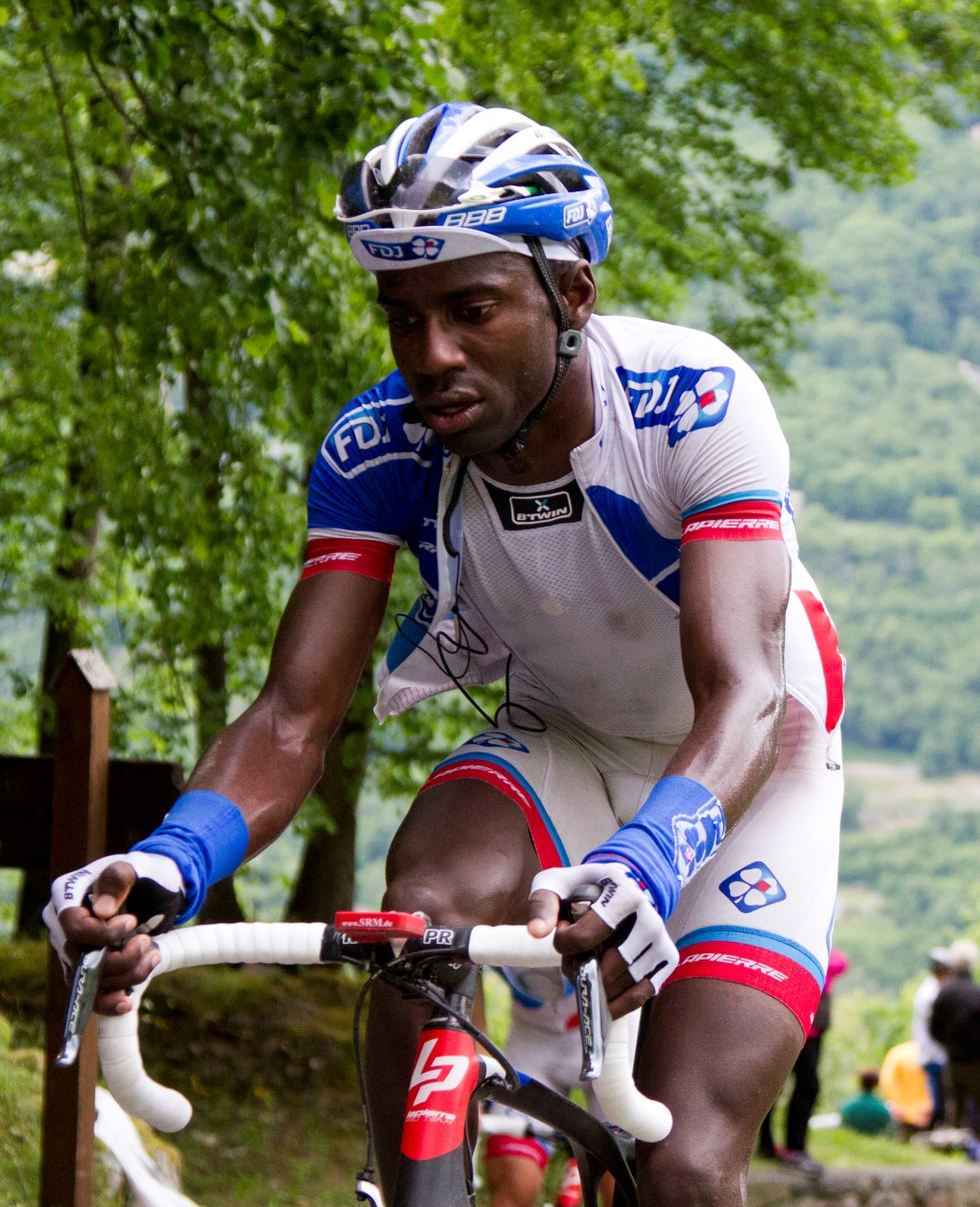
- Reza at the 2015 Giro d'Italia

Personal information
- Full name: Kévin Reza
- Nickname: LaRez
- Born: 18 May 1988 (age 38) Versailles, Yvelines, France
- Height: 1.86 m (6 ft 1 in)
- Weight: 72 kg (159 lb; 11.3 st)

Cycling career
- Sport: Cycling
- Current team: B&B Hotels p/b KTM
- Discipline: Road
- Role: Rider
- Rider type: Sprinter

Amateur teams
- 2007–2010: Vendée U
- 2010: Bbox Bouygues Telecom (stagiaire)

Professional teams
- 2011–2014: Team Europcar
- 2015–2017: FDJ
- 2018–2021: Vital Concept

Kévin Reza (born 18 May 1988) is a French former professional road bicycle racer, who last rode for UCI ProTeam B&B Hotels p/b KTM. He was named in the start list for the 2015 Vuelta a España.

== Early life ==
Reza was born in May 1988 on the outskirts of Paris. His family originate from Guadeloupe.

== Career ==
Reza signed his first professional contract in 2011 for French cycling team Team Europcar. In 2013 he took part in his first Grand Tour, the Tour de France, finishing in 134th position overall.

In 2015, Reza signed for French team FDJ. Whilst at FDJ, during the 2017 Tour de Romandie, Reza was a victim of racial abuse from Team Sky rider Gianni Moscon. Moscon was subsequently suspended from racing with Team Sky for six weeks.

In August 2017, Reza was named as one of fifteen riders joining new French cycling outfit Vital Concept. In June 2021, Reza announced that he would be retiring from cycling at the end of the season.

== Activism and advocacy ==
At the 2020 Tour de France, Reza was involved in a small gesture of solidarity with the Black Lives Matter movement. As the only black rider in the race, he rode at the front of the peloton on the final day of racing.

== Major results ==
2007
3rd Madison, National Junior Track Championships
2008
1st Stage 2 Vuelta Madrid Under-23
2009
2nd Overall Circuit du Mené
3rd Les Boucles de la Loire
8th Overall Tour de Martinique

1st Stages 1, 5 & 8a

2010
1st Les Boucles de la Loire
7th Classic Loire Atlantique
2011
3rd Madison, National Track Championships
2012
9th Overall Rhône-Alpes Isère Tour
2013
8th Cholet-Pays de Loire
9th Brussels Cycling Classic
2014
3rd Road race, National Road Championships
6th Classic Loire Atlantique
9th Overall Tour de Picardie
2015
4th Classic Sud-Ardèche
10th Classic Loire Atlantique
2016
7th Overall Tour de Picardie
2017
3rd Paris–Camembert
8th Grand Prix de Plumelec-Morbihan
2018
4th Paris–Chauny
9th Grand Prix de Wallonie
2019
6th Classic Loire Atlantique
10th Heistse Pijl

=== Grand Tour general classification results timeline ===
Grand Tour	2013	2014	2015	2016	2017	2018	2019	2020
Giro d'Italia	—	—	103	—	—	—	—	—
Tour de France	134	73	—	—	—	—	—	137
Vuelta a España	—	—	113	DNF	—	—	—	—

Legend
—	Did not compete
DNF	Did not finish
