= Giovanni Bernaudeau =

French former road bicycle racer

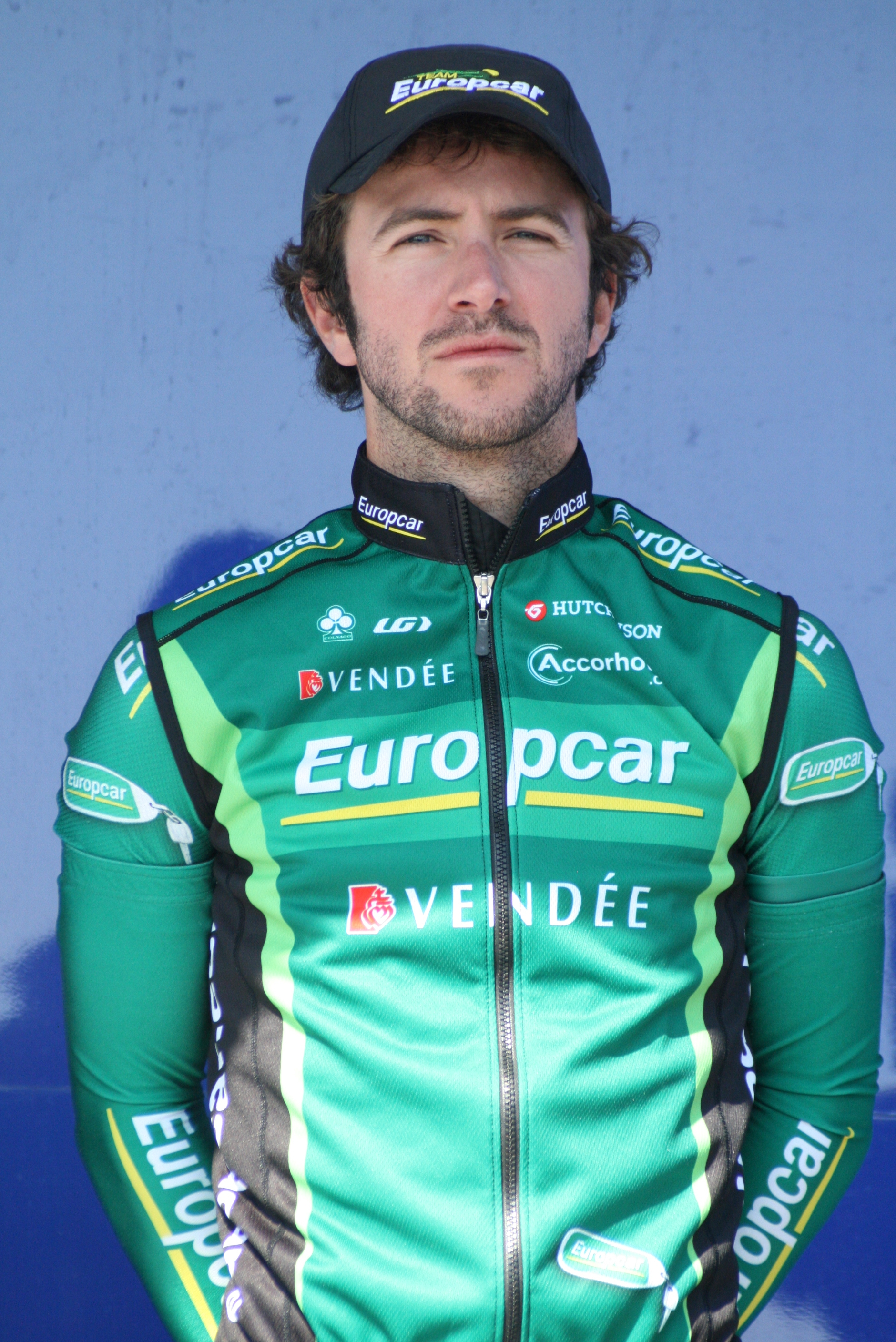
- Bernaudeau at the 2011 Four Days of Dunkirk

Personal information
- Full name: Giovanni Bernaudeau
- Born: 25 August 1983 (age 43) Fontenay-le-Comte, France
- Height: 1.75 m (5 ft 9 in)
- Weight: 62 kg (137 lb)

Cycling career
- Sport: Cycling
- Current team: Retired
- Discipline: Road
- Role: Rider
- Rider type: Rouleur

Amateur teams
- 2002–2004: Vendée U–Pays de la Loire
- 2004: Brioches La Boulangère (stagiaire)

Professional team
- 2005–2015: Bouygues Télécom

Giovanni Bernaudeau (born 25 August 1983 in Fontenay-le-Comte, Vendée) is a French former road bicycle racer, who competed professionally between 2005 and 2015, for the Team Europcar team and its previous iterations. He is the son of former professional cyclist Jean-René Bernaudeau.

== Major results ==
2004
2nd Paris–Tours Espoirs
2008
6th Overall La Tropicale Amissa Bongo
2011
10th Overall Paris–Corrèze
2014
9th Overall La Tropicale Amissa Bongo
2015
2nd Overall La Tropicale Amissa Bongo

1st Mountains classification
