= Morgan Lamoisson =

French cyclist

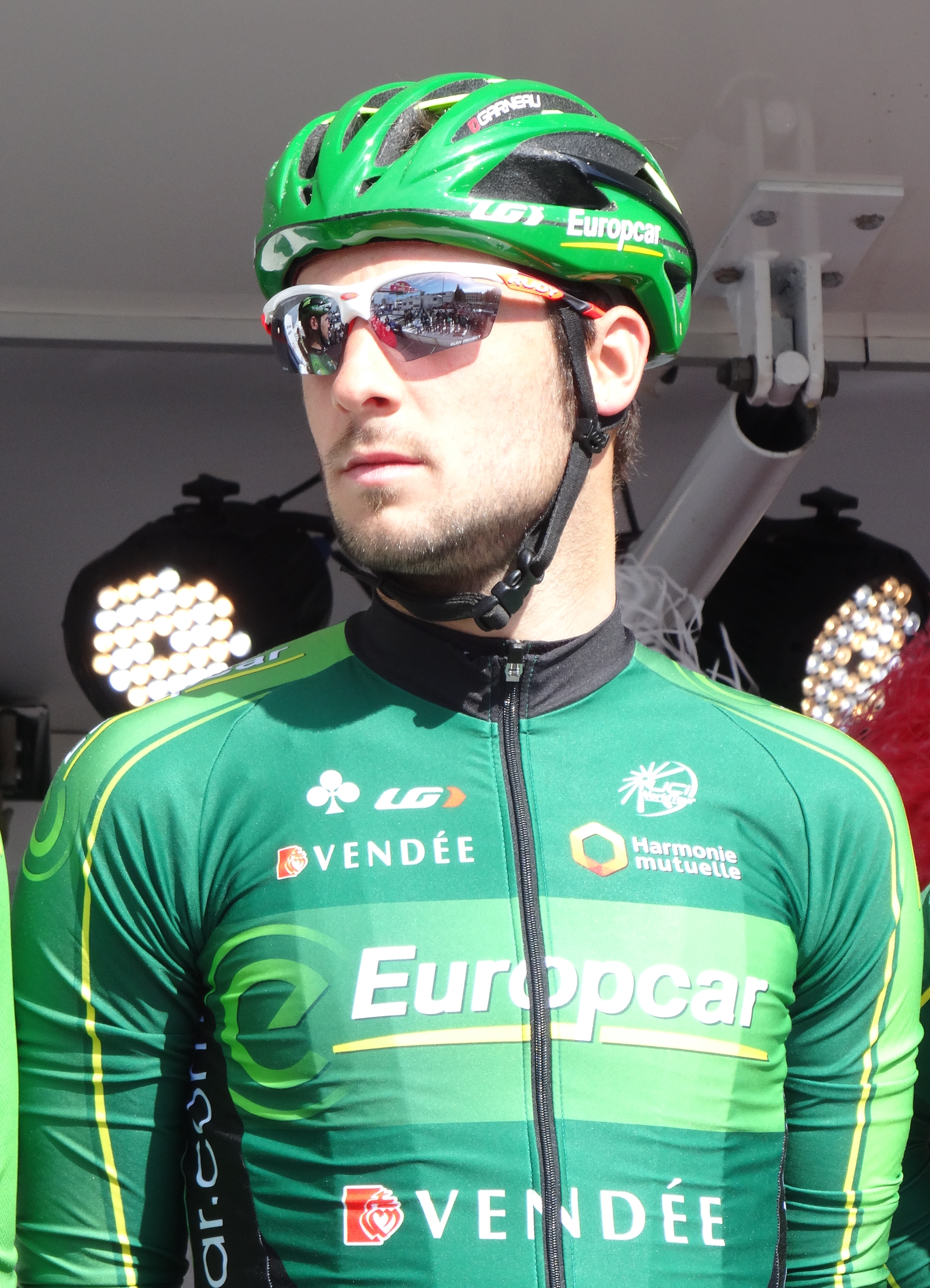
- Lamoisson at the 2014 Grand Prix de Denain

Personal information
- Full name: Morgan Lamoisson
- Born: 7 September 1988 (age 38) Issoudun, France
- Height: 1.78 m (5 ft 10 in)
- Weight: 69 kg (152 lb)

Cycling career
- Sport: Cycling
- Current team: Retired
- Discipline: Road
- Role: Rider
- Rider type: Sprinter

Amateur teams
- 2007–2010: Blois CAC 41
- 2011–2012: Vendée U
- 2016: Vendée U

Professional team
- 2013–2015: Team Europcar

Morgan Lamoisson (born 7 September 1988 in Issoudun) is a French former cyclist, who rode professionally between 2013 and 2015 for the Team Europcar team. Lamoisson retired at the end of the 2016 season, after a season with amateur team Vendée U.

== Major results ==
2011
1st Stage 3 Tour du Loir-et-Cher
6th La Roue Tourangelle
2012
4th Val d'Ille Classic
2014
5th Châteauroux Classic
7th Overall Tour de l'Eurométropole
2015
6th Duo Normand (with Julien Morice)
