= List of teams and cyclists in the 2016 Vuelta a España =

List of cyclists

The 2016 Vuelta a España was the 71st edition of the race. It was the last of cycling's three Grand Tours to take place during the 2016 road cycling season. The race started in Ourense on 20 August and finished in Madrid on 11 September.

All 18 UCI World Tour teams were automatically entitled to start the race. In May 2016, four UCI Professional Continental teams were awarded wildcard places in the race by the organisers, Unipublic.

== Teams ==
The 18 UCI WorldTeams were automatically invited to participate in the Vuelta. In addition, the race organisers, Unipublic, invited four wildcard teams. These included Caja Rural–Seguros RGA, the only Spanish-registered UCI Professional Continental team. Two French teams, Cofidis and Direct Énergie, also received entries. The final team to be invited was Bora–Argon 18.

UCI WorldTeams

- Movistar Team (riders)
- Tinkoff (riders)
- Team Sky (riders)
- BMC Racing Team (riders)
- LottoNL–Jumbo (riders)
- Orica–BikeExchange (riders)
- Astana (riders)
- FDJ (riders)
- Team Giant–Alpecin (riders)
- Trek–Segafredo (riders)
- AG2R La Mondiale (riders)
- Team Katusha (riders)
- Lotto–Soudal (riders)
- Etixx–Quick-Step (riders)
- Cannondale–Drapac (riders)
- Team Dimension Data (riders)
- IAM Cycling (riders)
- Lampre–Merida (riders)

UCI Professional Continental teams

- Cofidis (riders)
- Bora–Argon 18 (riders)
- Caja Rural–Seguros RGA (riders)
- Direct Énergie (riders)

== Cyclists ==
Legend
No.	Starting number worn by the rider during the Vuelta
Pos.	Position in the general classification
Time	Deficit to the winner of the general classification
General classification	Denotes the winner of the general classification
Points classification	Denotes the winner of the points classification
Mountains classification	Denotes the winner of the mountains classification
Combination classification	Denotes the winner of the combination classification
DNS	Denotes a rider who did not start, followed by the stage before which he withdrew
DNF	Denotes a rider who did not finish, followed by the stage in which he withdrew
DSQ	Denotes a rider who was disqualified from the race, followed by the stage in which this occurred
Age correct as of 20 August 2016, the date on which the Vuelta began

=== By starting number ===
No.	Name	Nationality	Team	Age	Pos.	Time	Ref
1	Alejandro Valverde	Spain	Movistar Team	36			
2	Jonathan Castroviejo	Spain	Movistar Team	29			
3	Imanol Erviti	Spain	Movistar Team	32			
4	Rubén Fernández	Spain	Movistar Team	25			
5	José Herrada	Spain	Movistar Team	30			
6	Daniel Moreno	Spain	Movistar Team	34			
7	Nairo Quintana	Colombia	Movistar Team	26			
8	José Joaquín Rojas	Spain	Movistar Team	31			
9	Rory Sutherland	Australia	Movistar Team	34			
11	Alberto Contador	Spain	Tinkoff	33			
12	Daniele Bennati	Italy	Tinkoff	35			
13	Manuele Boaro	Italy	Tinkoff	29			
14	Michael Gogl	Austria	Tinkoff	22			
15	Jesús Hernández	Spain	Tinkoff	34			
16	Robert Kišerlovski	Croatia	Tinkoff	30	DNS-6	—	
17	Sérgio Paulinho	Portugal	Tinkoff	36			
18	Ivan Rovny	Russia	Tinkoff	28			
19	Yuri Trofimov	Russia	Tinkoff	32			
21	Chris Froome	Great Britain	Team Sky	31			
22	Ian Boswell	United States	Team Sky	25			
23	Michał Gołaś	Poland	Team Sky	32			
24	Peter Kennaugh	Great Britain	Team Sky	27			
25	Christian Knees	Germany	Team Sky	35			
26	Leopold König	Czech Republic	Team Sky	28			
27	Michał Kwiatkowski	Poland	Team Sky	25	DNF-7	—	
28	David López	Spain	Team Sky	35			
29	Salvatore Puccio	Italy	Team Sky	26			
31	Tejay van Garderen	United States	BMC Racing Team	28	DNF-17	—	
32	Darwin Atapuma	Colombia	BMC Racing Team	28			
33	Silvan Dillier	Switzerland	BMC Racing Team	26			
34	Jempy Drucker	Luxembourg	BMC Racing Team	29			
35	Philippe Gilbert	Belgium	BMC Racing Team	34	DNF-14	—	
36	Ben Hermans	Belgium	BMC Racing Team	30			
37	Samuel Sánchez	Spain	BMC Racing Team	38			
38	Dylan Teuns	Belgium	BMC Racing Team	24			
39	Danilo Wyss	Switzerland	BMC Racing Team	30			
41	Steven Kruijswijk	Netherlands	LottoNL–Jumbo	29	DNS-6	—	
42	Enrico Battaglin	Italy	LottoNL–Jumbo	26	DNF-9	—	
43	George Bennett	New Zealand	LottoNL–Jumbo	26			
44	Koen Bouwman	Netherlands	LottoNL–Jumbo	22			
45	Victor Campenaerts	Belgium	LottoNL–Jumbo	24			
46	Robert Gesink	Netherlands	LottoNL–Jumbo	30			
47	Martijn Keizer	Netherlands	LottoNL–Jumbo	28			
48	Bram Tankink	Netherlands	LottoNL–Jumbo	37			
49	Jos van Emden	Netherlands	LottoNL–Jumbo	31	DNS-17	—	
51	Esteban Chaves	Colombia	Orica–BikeExchange	26			
52	Sam Bewley	New Zealand	Orica–BikeExchange	29			
53	Simon Gerrans	Australia	Orica–BikeExchange	36			
54	Jack Haig	Australia	Orica–BikeExchange	22			
55	Damien Howson	Australia	Orica–BikeExchange	24			
56	Jens Keukeleire	Belgium	Orica–BikeExchange	27			
57	Magnus Cort Nielsen	Denmark	Orica–BikeExchange	23			
58	Svein Tuft	Canada	Orica–BikeExchange	39			
59	Simon Yates	Great Britain	Orica–BikeExchange	24			
61	Michele Scarponi	Italy	Astana	36			
62	Dario Cataldo	Italy	Astana	31			
63	Dmitriy Gruzdev	Kazakhstan	Astana	30			
64	Miguel Ángel López	Colombia	Astana	22	DNF-6	—	
65	Davide Malacarne	Italy	Astana	29	DNF-14	—	
66	Luis León Sánchez	Spain	Astana	32			
67	Gatis Smukulis	Latvia	Astana	38			
68	Alessandro Vanotti	Italy	Astana	35			
69	Andrey Zeits	Kazakhstan	Astana	29			
71	Kenny Elissonde	France	FDJ	25			
72	Odd Christian Eiking	Norway	FDJ	21			
73	Murilo Fischer	Brazil	FDJ	37	DNF-5	—	
74	Alexandre Geniez	France	FDJ	28			
75	Mathieu Ladagnous	France	FDJ	31			
76	Johan Le Bon	France	FDJ	25	DNF-14	—	
77	Lorrenzo Manzin	France	FDJ	22			
78	Laurent Pichon	France	FDJ	30	DNF-11	—	
79	Kévin Reza	France	FDJ	28	DNF-10	—	
81	Warren Barguil	France	Team Giant–Alpecin	24	DNF-3	—	
82	Nikias Arndt	Germany	Team Giant–Alpecin	24			
83	Koen de Kort	Netherlands	Team Giant–Alpecin	33			
84	Johannes Fröhlinger	Germany	Team Giant–Alpecin	31			
85	Chad Haga	United States	Team Giant–Alpecin	27			
86	Tobias Ludvigsson	Sweden	Team Giant–Alpecin	25			
87	Sindre Lunke	Norway	Team Giant–Alpecin	23			
88	Tom Stamsnijder	Netherlands	Team Giant–Alpecin	31			
89	Zico Waeytens	Belgium	Team Giant–Alpecin	24	DNF-13	—	
91	Haimar Zubeldia	Spain	Trek–Segafredo	39			
92	Fumiyuki Beppu	Japan	Trek–Segafredo	33			
93	Julien Bernard	France	Trek–Segafredo	24			
94	Niccolò Bonifazio	Italy	Trek–Segafredo	22	DNF-7	—	
95	Laurent Didier	Luxembourg	Trek–Segafredo	32			
96	Fabio Felline	Italy	Trek–Segafredo	26			
97	Markel Irizar	Spain	Trek–Segafredo	36	DNF-10	—	
98	Kiel Reijnen	United States	Trek–Segafredo	30			
99	Riccardo Zoidl	Austria	Trek–Segafredo	28			
101	Jean-Christophe Péraud	France	AG2R La Mondiale	39			
102	Gediminas Bagdonas	Lithuania	AG2R La Mondiale	30			
103	Jan Bakelants	Belgium	AG2R La Mondiale	30			
104	François Bidard	France	AG2R La Mondiale	24			
105	Axel Domont	France	AG2R La Mondiale	26			
106	Quentin Jaurégui	France	AG2R La Mondiale	22			
107	Pierre Latour	France	AG2R La Mondiale	22			
108	Sébastien Minard	France	AG2R La Mondiale	34	DNS-6	—	
109	Christophe Riblon	France	AG2R La Mondiale	35			
111	Alberto Losada	Spain	Team Katusha	34			
112	Sven Erik Bystrøm	Norway	Team Katusha	24			
113	Pavel Kochetkov	Russia	Team Katusha	30			
114	Sergey Lagutin	Russia	Team Katusha	35			
115	Tiago Machado	Portugal	Team Katusha	30			
116	Matvey Mamykin	Russia	Team Katusha	33			
117	Jhonatan Restrepo	Colombia	Team Katusha	23			
118	Egor Silin	Russia	Team Katusha	28			
119	Rein Taaramäe	Estonia	Team Katusha	29	DNF-7	—	
121	Bart De Clercq	Belgium	Lotto–Soudal	29			
122	Sander Armée	Belgium	Lotto–Soudal	30			
123	Thomas De Gendt	Belgium	Lotto–Soudal	29			
124	Gert Dockx	Belgium	Lotto–Soudal	28			
125	Adam Hansen	Australia	Lotto–Soudal	35			
126	Maxime Monfort	Belgium	Lotto–Soudal	33			
127	Tosh Van der Sande	Belgium	Lotto–Soudal	25			
128	Louis Vervaeke	Belgium	Lotto–Soudal	22			
129	Jelle Wallays	Belgium	Lotto–Soudal	27			
131	Gianluca Brambilla	Italy	Etixx–Quick-Step	28			
132	Maxime Bouet	France	Etixx–Quick-Step	29			
133	David de la Cruz	Spain	Etixx–Quick-Step	27			
134	Yves Lampaert	Belgium	Etixx–Quick-Step	25			
135	Gianni Meersman	Belgium	Etixx–Quick-Step	30			
136	Pieter Serry	Belgium	Etixx–Quick-Step	27			
137	Zdeněk Štybar	Czech Republic	Etixx–Quick-Step	30			
138	Niki Terpstra	Netherlands	Etixx–Quick-Step	32			
139	Martin Velits	Slovakia	Etixx–Quick-Step	31			
141	Andrew Talansky	United States	Cannondale–Drapac	27			
142	Patrick Bevin	New Zealand	Cannondale–Drapac	25	DNF-11	—	
143	Simon Clarke	Australia	Cannondale–Drapac	30	DNS-11	—	
144	Joe Dombrowski	United States	Cannondale–Drapac	25			
145	Davide Formolo	Italy	Cannondale–Drapac	23			
146	Ben King	United States	Cannondale–Drapac	27			
147	Moreno Moser	Italy	Cannondale–Drapac	25			
148	Pierre Rolland	France	Cannondale–Drapac	29			
149	Davide Villella	Italy	Cannondale–Drapac	25			
151	Igor Antón	Spain	Team Dimension Data	33	DNS-9	—	
152	Nicolas Dougall	South Africa	Team Dimension Data	23			
153	Tyler Farrar	United States	Team Dimension Data	32			
154	Omar Fraile	Spain	Team Dimension Data	26			
155	Nathan Haas	Australia	Team Dimension Data	27			
156	Jacques Janse van Rensburg	South Africa	Team Dimension Data	28	DNS-15	—	
157	Merhawi Kudus	Eritrea	Team Dimension Data	22			
158	Kristian Sbaragli	Italy	Team Dimension Data	26			
159	Jaco Venter	South Africa	Team Dimension Data	29			
161	Mathias Frank	Switzerland	IAM Cycling	29			
162	Clément Chevrier	France	IAM Cycling	24			
163	Dries Devenyns	Belgium	IAM Cycling	33			
164	Vegard Stake Laengen	Norway	IAM Cycling	27			
165	Simon Pellaud	Switzerland	IAM Cycling	23			
166	Vicente Reynés	Spain	IAM Cycling	35	DNF-4	—	
167	Jonas van Genechten	Belgium	IAM Cycling	29			
168	Larry Warbasse	United States	IAM Cycling	26			
169	Marcel Wyss	Switzerland	IAM Cycling	30			
171	Louis Meintjes	South Africa	Lampre–Merida	24			
172	Yukiya Arashiro	Japan	Lampre–Merida	31			
173	Mattia Cattaneo	Italy	Lampre–Merida	25			
174	Valerio Conti	Italy	Lampre–Merida	23			
175	Kristijan Đurasek	Croatia	Lampre–Merida	29			
176	Mário Costa	Portugal	Lampre–Merida	30	DNF-17	—	
177	Tsgabu Grmay	Ethiopia	Lampre–Merida	24			
178	Ilia Koshevoy	Belarus	Lampre–Merida	25			
179	Federico Zurlo	Italy	Lampre–Merida	22	DNF-4	—	
181	Luis Ángel Maté	Spain	Cofidis	32			
182	Yoann Bagot	France	Cofidis	28	DNF-9	—	
183	Loïc Chetout	France	Cofidis	23			
184	Jérôme Cousin	France	Cofidis	27			
185	Romain Hardy	France	Cofidis	27			
186	Rudy Molard	France	Cofidis	26			
187	Stéphane Rossetto	France	Cofidis	29			
188	Florian Sénéchal	France	Cofidis	23	DNF-12	—	
189	Kenneth Vanbilsen	Belgium	Cofidis	26	DNF-14	—	
191	José Mendes	Portugal	Bora–Argon 18	31			
192	Cesare Benedetti	Italy	Bora–Argon 18	29			
193	Silvio Herklotz	Germany	Bora–Argon 18	22	DNS-11	—	
194	Bartosz Huzarski	Poland	Bora–Argon 18	35	DNF-10	—	
195	Gregor Mühlberger	Austria	Bora–Argon 18	22			
196	Christoph Pfingsten	Germany	Bora–Argon 18	28			
197	Michael Schwarzmann	Germany	Bora–Argon 18	25			
198	Rüdiger Selig	Germany	Bora–Argon 18	27			
199	Scott Thwaites	Great Britain	Bora–Argon 18	26			
201	David Arroyo	Spain	Caja Rural–Seguros RGA	36			
202	Pello Bilbao	Spain	Caja Rural–Seguros RGA	26			
203	Hugh Carthy	Great Britain	Caja Rural–Seguros RGA	22			
204	José Gonçalves	Portugal	Caja Rural–Seguros RGA	27	DNF-11	—	
205	Ángel Madrazo	Spain	Caja Rural–Seguros RGA	28	DNF-14	—	
206	Lluís Mas	Spain	Caja Rural–Seguros RGA	27	DNS-5	—	
207	Sergio Pardilla	Spain	Caja Rural–Seguros RGA	32			
208	Eduard Prades	Spain	Caja Rural–Seguros RGA	29			
209	Jaime Rosón	Spain	Caja Rural–Seguros RGA	23			
211	Romain Sicard	France	Direct Énergie	28			
212	Ryan Anderson	Canada	Direct Énergie	29			
213	Lilian Calmejane	France	Direct Énergie	23			
214	Romain Cardis	France	Direct Énergie	24			
215	Tony Hurel	France	Direct Énergie	28	DNF-9	—	
216	Fabrice Jeandesboz	France	Direct Énergie	31	DNF-12	—	
217	Julien Morice	France	Direct Énergie	25			
218	Bryan Nauleau	France	Direct Énergie	28			
219	Perrig Quéméneur	France	Direct Énergie	32			

=== By team ===
Movistar Team (MOV)
No.	Rider	Pos.
1	Alejandro Valverde (ESP)	
2	Jonathan Castroviejo (ESP)	
3	Imanol Erviti (ESP)	
4	Rubén Fernández (ESP)	
5	José Herrada (ESP)	
6	Daniel Moreno (ESP)	
7	Nairo Quintana (COL)	
8	José Joaquín Rojas (ESP)	
9	Rory Sutherland (AUS)	
Directeur sportif: José Luis Arrieta

Tinkoff (TNK)
No.	Rider	Pos.
11	Alberto Contador (ESP)	
12	Daniele Bennati (ITA)	
13	Manuele Boaro (ITA)	
14	Michael Gogl (AUT)	
15	Jesús Hernández (ESP)	
16	Robert Kišerlovski (CRO)	DNS-6
17	Sérgio Paulinho (POR)	
18	Ivan Rovny (RUS)	
19	Yuri Trofimov (RUS)	
Directeur sportif: Steven de Jongh

Team Sky (SKY)
No.	Rider	Pos.
21	Chris Froome (GBR)	
22	Ian Boswell (USA)	
23	Michał Gołaś (POL)	
24	Peter Kennaugh (GBR)	
25	Christian Knees (GER)	
26	Leopold König (CZE)	
27	Michał Kwiatkowski (POL)	DNF-7
28	David López (ESP)	
29	Salvatore Puccio (ITA)	
Directeur sportif: Dario Cioni

BMC Racing Team (BMC)
No.	Rider	Pos.
31	Tejay van Garderen (USA)	DNF-17
32	Darwin Atapuma (COL)	
33	Silvan Dillier (SUI)	
34	Jempy Drucker (LUX)	
35	Philippe Gilbert (BEL)	DNF-14
36	Ben Hermans (BEL)	
37	Samuel Sánchez (ESP)	
38	Dylan Teuns (BEL)	
39	Danilo Wyss (SUI)	
Directeur sportif: Jan Boven

LottoNL–Jumbo (TLJ)
No.	Rider	Pos.
41	Steven Kruijswijk (NED)	DNS-6
42	Enrico Battaglin (ITA)	DNF-9
43	George Bennett (NZL)	
44	Koen Bouwman (NED)	
45	Victor Campenaerts (BEL)	
46	Robert Gesink (NED)	
47	Martijn Keizer (NED)	
48	Bram Tankink (NED)	
49	Jos van Emden (NED)	DNS-17
Directeur sportif:

Orica–BikeExchange (OBE)
No.	Rider	Pos.
51	Esteban Chaves (COL)	
52	Sam Bewley (NZL)	
53	Simon Gerrans (AUS)	
54	Jack Haig (AUS)	
55	Damien Howson (AUS)	
56	Jens Keukeleire (BEL)	
57	Magnus Cort Nielsen (DEN)	
58	Svein Tuft (CAN)	
59	Simon Yates (GBR)	
Directeur sportif: Neil Stephens

Astana (AST)
No.	Rider	Pos.
61	Michele Scarponi (ITA)	
62	Dario Cataldo (ITA)	
63	Dmitriy Gruzdev (KAZ)	
64	Miguel Ángel López (COL)	DNF-6
65	Davide Malacarne (ITA)	DNF-14
66	Luis León Sánchez (ESP)	
67	Gatis Smukulis (LAT)	
68	Alessandro Vanotti (ITA)	
69	Andrey Zeits (KAZ)	
Directeur sportif: Alexandr Shefer

FDJ (FDJ)
No.	Rider	Pos.
71	Kenny Elissonde (FRA)	
72	Odd Christian Eiking (NOR)	
73	Murilo Fischer (BRA)	DNF-5
74	Alexandre Geniez (FRA)	
75	Mathieu Ladagnous (FRA)	
76	Johan Le Bon (FRA)	DNF-14
77	Lorrenzo Manzin (FRA)	
78	Laurent Pichon (FRA)	DNF-11
79	Kévin Reza (FRA)	DNF-10
Directeur sportif: Frank Pineau

Team Giant–Alpecin (TGA)
No.	Rider	Pos.
81	Warren Barguil (FRA)	DNF-3
82	Nikias Arndt (GER)	
83	Koen de Kort (NED)	
84	Johannes Fröhlinger (GER)	
85	Chad Haga (USA)	
86	Tobias Ludvigsson (SWE)	
87	Sindre Lunke (NOR)	
88	Tom Stamsnijder (NED)	
89	Zico Waeytens (BEL)	DNF-13
Directeur sportif: Arthur van Dongen

Trek–Segafredo (TFS)
No.	Rider	Pos.
91	Haimar Zubeldia (ESP)	
92	Fumiyuki Beppu (JPN)	
93	Julien Bernard (FRA)	
94	Niccolò Bonifazio (ITA)	DNF-7
95	Laurent Didier (LUX)	
96	Fabio Felline (ITA)	
97	Markel Irizar (ESP)	DNF-10
98	Kiel Reijnen (USA)	
99	Riccardo Zoidl (AUT)	
Directeur sportif: Dirk Demol

AG2R La Mondiale (ALM)
No.	Rider	Pos.
101	Jean-Christophe Péraud (FRA)	
102	Gediminas Bagdonas (LTU)	
103	Jan Bakelants (BEL)	
104	François Bidard (FRA)	
105	Axel Domont (FRA)	
106	Quentin Jaurégui (FRA)	
107	Pierre Latour (FRA)	
108	Sébastien Minard (FRA)	DNS-6
109	Christophe Riblon (FRA)	
Directeur sportif: Julien Jurdie

Team Katusha (KAT)
No.	Rider	Pos.
111	Alberto Losada (ESP)	
112	Sven Erik Bystrøm (NOR)	
113	Pavel Kochetkov (RUS)	
114	Sergey Lagutin (RUS)	
115	Tiago Machado (POR)	
116	Matvey Mamykin (RUS)	
117	Jhonatan Restrepo (COL)	
118	Egor Silin (RUS)	
119	Rein Taaramäe (EST)	DNF-7
Directeur sportif: José Azevedo

Lotto–Soudal (LTS)
No.	Rider	Pos.
121	Bart De Clercq (BEL)	
122	Sander Armée (BEL)	
123	Thomas De Gendt (BEL)	
124	Gert Dockx (BEL)	
125	Adam Hansen (AUS)	
126	Maxime Monfort (BEL)	
127	Tosh Van der Sande (BEL)	
128	Louis Vervaeke (BEL)	
129	Jelle Wallays (BEL)	
Directeur sportif: Mario Aerts

Etixx–Quick-Step (EQS)
No.	Rider	Pos.
131	Gianluca Brambilla (ITA)	
132	Maxime Bouet (FRA)	
133	David de la Cruz (ESP)	
134	Yves Lampaert (BEL)	
135	Gianni Meersman (BEL)	
136	Pieter Serry (BEL)	
137	Zdeněk Štybar (CZE)	
138	Niki Terpstra (NED)	
139	Martin Velits (SVK)	
Directeur sportif: Rik Van Slycke

Cannondale–Drapac (CDT)
No.	Rider	Pos.
141	Andrew Talansky (USA)	
142	Patrick Bevin (NZL)	DNF-11
143	Simon Clarke (AUS)	DNS-11
144	Joe Dombrowski (USA)	
145	Davide Formolo (ITA)	
146	Ben King (USA)	
147	Moreno Moser (ITA)	
148	Pierre Rolland (FRA)	
149	Davide Villella (ITA)	
Directeur sportif: Bingen Fernández

Team Dimension Data (DDD)
No.	Rider	Pos.
151	Igor Antón (ESP)	DNS-9
152	Nicolas Dougall (RSA)	
153	Tyler Farrar (USA)	
154	Omar Fraile (ESP)	
155	Nathan Haas (AUS)	
156	Jacques Janse van Rensburg (RSA)	DNS-15
157	Merhawi Kudus (ERI)	
158	Kristian Sbaragli (ITA)	
159	Jaco Venter (RSA)	
Directeur sportif: Alex Sans Vega

IAM Cycling (IAM)
No.	Rider	Pos.
161	Mathias Frank (SUI)	
162	Clément Chevrier (FRA)	
163	Dries Devenyns (BEL)	
164	Vegard Stake Laengen (NOR)	
165	Simon Pellaud (SUI)	
166	Vicente Reynés (ESP)	DNF-4
167	Jonas van Genechten (BEL)	
168	Larry Warbasse (USA)	
169	Marcel Wyss (SUI)	
Directeur sportif: Eddy Seigneur

Lampre–Merida (LAM)
No.	Rider	Pos.
171	Louis Meintjes (RSA)	
172	Yukiya Arashiro (JPN)	
173	Mattia Cattaneo (ITA)	
174	Valerio Conti (ITA)	
175	Kristijan Đurasek (CRO)	
176	Mário Costa (POR)	DNF-17
177	Tsgabu Grmay (ETH)	
178	Ilia Koshevoy (BLR)	
179	Federico Zurlo (ITA)	DNF-4
Directeur sportif: Simone Pedrazzini

Cofidis (COF)
No.	Rider	Pos.
181	Luis Ángel Maté (ESP)	
182	Yoann Bagot (FRA)	DNF-9
183	Loïc Chetout (FRA)	
184	Jérôme Cousin (FRA)	
185	Romain Hardy (FRA)	
186	Rudy Molard (FRA)	
187	Stéphane Rossetto (FRA)	
188	Florian Sénéchal (FRA)	DNF-12
189	Kenneth Vanbilsen (BEL)	DNF-14
Directeur sportif: Christian Guiberteau

Bora–Argon 18 (BOA)
No.	Rider	Pos.
191	José Mendes (POR)	
192	Cesare Benedetti (ITA)	
193	Silvio Herklotz (GER)	DNS-11
194	Bartosz Huzarski (POL)	DNF-10
195	Gregor Mühlberger (AUT)	
196	Christoph Pfingsten (GER)	
197	Michael Schwarzmann (GER)	
198	Rüdiger Selig (GER)	
199	Scott Thwaites (GBR)	
Directeur sportif:

Caja Rural–Seguros RGA (CJR)
No.	Rider	Pos.
201	David Arroyo (ESP)	
202	Pello Bilbao (ESP)	
203	Hugh Carthy (GBR)	
204	José Gonçalves (POR)	DNF-11
205	Ángel Madrazo (ESP)	DNF-14
206	Lluís Mas (ESP)	DNS-5
207	Sergio Pardilla (ESP)	
208	Eduard Prades (ESP)	
209	Jaime Rosón (ESP)	
Directeur sportif: Eugenio Goikoetxea

Direct Énergie (DEN)
No.	Rider	Pos.
211	Romain Sicard (FRA)	
212	Ryan Anderson (CAN)	
213	Lilian Calmejane (FRA)	
214	Romain Cardis (FRA)	
215	Tony Hurel (FRA)	DNF-9
216	Fabrice Jeandesboz (FRA)	DNF-12
217	Julien Morice (FRA)	
218	Bryan Nauleau (FRA)	
219	Perrig Quéméneur (FRA)	
Directeur sportif: Dominique Arnould

=== By nationality ===
The 198 riders that competed in the 2016 Vuelta a España represented 37 countries.

Country	No. of riders	Finishers	Stage wins
Australia	7		
Austria	3		
Belarus	1		
Belgium	21		4 (Gianni Meersman ×2, Jonas van Genechten ×1, Jens Keukeleire ×1)
Brazil	1		
Canada	2		
Colombia	5		1 (Nairo Quintana)
Croatia	2		
Czech Republic	2		
Denmark	1		1 (Magnus Cort Nielsen)
Eritrea	1		
Estonia	1		
Ethiopia	1		
France	34		2 (Alexandre Geniez ×1, Lilian Calmejane ×1)
Germany	7		
Italy	19		2 (Valerio Conti ×1, Gianluca Brambilla ×1)
Japan	2		
Kazakhstan	2		
Latvia	1		
Lithuania	1		
Luxembourg	2		1 (Jempy Drucker)
Netherlands	9		1 (Robert Gesink)
New Zealand	3		
Norway	4		
Poland	3		
Portugal	5		
Russia	6		1 (Sergey Lagutin)
Slovakia	1		
South Africa	4		
Spain	27		1 (David de la Cruz)
Sweden	1		
Switzerland	5		1 (Mathias Frank)
Great Britain	5		2 (Simon Yates ×1, Chris Froome ×1)
United States	10		
Total	198	158	17 (Note: The team time trial on stage 1, won by Team Sky, is not counted in this total.)
