= 2016 Vuelta a España, Stage 12 to Stage 21 =

Cycling race stages

The 2016 Vuelta a España began on 21 August, with Stage 21 scheduled for 11 September. The 2016 edition of the cycle race began with the only team time trial stage of the race, just outside Ourense.

== Classification standings ==
Legend (Note: Jerseys appearing in the table on the left of the page indicate those worn by the cyclist during the particular stage, while those appearing in the table on the right of the page indicate those awarded to the cyclist after the stage.)
Red jersey	Denotes the leader of the general classification	Green jersey	Denotes the leader of the points classification
Blue polka dot jersey	Denotes the leader of the mountains classification	White jersey	Denotes the leader of the combination rider classification

== Stage 12 ==
1 September 2016 — Los Corrales de Buelna – Bilbao, 193.2 km (120.0 mi)

Stage 12 result

	Rider	Team	Time
1	Jens Keukeleire (BEL)	Orica–BikeExchange	4h 31' 43"
2	Maxime Bouet (FRA)	Etixx–Quick-Step	s.t.
3	Fabio Felline (ITA)	Trek–Segafredo	s.t.
4	Kristian Sbaragli (ITA)	Team Dimension Data	s.t.
5	Luis León Sánchez (ESP)	Astana	s.t.
6	Pello Bilbao (ESP)	Caja Rural–Seguros RGA	s.t.
7	Jan Bakelants (BEL)	AG2R La Mondiale	s.t.
8	Alejandro Valverde (ESP)	Movistar Team	s.t.
9	Silvan Dillier (SUI)	BMC Racing Team	s.t.
10	Mathias Frank (SUI)	IAM Cycling	s.t.

General classification after stage 12

	Rider	Team	Time
1	Nairo Quintana (COL)	Movistar Team	46h 53' 21"
2	Chris Froome (GBR)	Team Sky	+ 54"
3	Alejandro Valverde (ESP)	Movistar Team	+ 1' 05"
4	Esteban Chaves (COL)	Orica–BikeExchange	+ 2' 34"
5	Alberto Contador (ESP)	Tinkoff	+ 3' 08"
6	Leopold König (CZE)	Team Sky	+ 3' 09"
7	Simon Yates (GBR)	Orica–BikeExchange	+ 3' 25"
8	Michele Scarponi (ITA)	Astana	+ 3' 34"
9	David de la Cruz (ESP)	Etixx–Quick-Step	+ 3' 45"
10	Samuel Sánchez (ESP)	BMC Racing Team	+ 3' 56"

== Stage 13 ==
2 September 2016 — Bilbao – Urdax-Dantxarinea, 213.4 km (132.6 mi)

Stage 13 result

	Rider	Team	Time
1	Valerio Conti (ITA)	Lampre–Merida	5h 29' 04"
2	Danilo Wyss (SUI)	BMC Racing Team	+ 55"
3	Sergey Lagutin (RUS)	Team Katusha	+ 55"
4	Michael Gogl (AUT)	Tinkoff	+ 55"
5	Vegard Stake Laengen (NOR)	IAM Cycling	+ 55"
6	Yves Lampaert (BEL)	Etixx–Quick-Step	+ 55"
7	Cesare Benedetti (ITA)	Bora–Argon 18	+ 1' 02"
8	Jelle Wallays (BEL)	Lotto–Soudal	+ 1' 04"
9	Gatis Smukulis (LAT)	Astana	+ 1' 04"
10	Stéphane Rossetto (FRA)	Cofidis	+ 1' 08"

General classification after stage 13

	Rider	Team	Time
1	Nairo Quintana (COL)	Movistar Team	52h 56' 29"
2	Chris Froome (GBR)	Team Sky	+ 54"
3	Alejandro Valverde (ESP)	Movistar Team	+ 1' 05"
4	Esteban Chaves (COL)	Orica–BikeExchange	+ 2' 34"
5	Alberto Contador (ESP)	Tinkoff	+ 3' 08"
6	Leopold König (CZE)	Team Sky	+ 3' 09"
7	Simon Yates (GBR)	Orica–BikeExchange	+ 3' 25"
8	Michele Scarponi (ITA)	Astana	+ 3' 34"
9	David de la Cruz (ESP)	Etixx–Quick-Step	+ 3' 45"
10	Samuel Sánchez (ESP)	BMC Racing Team	+ 3' 56"

== Stage 14 ==
3 September 2016 — Urdax-Dantxarinea – Col d'Aubisque (Gourette), 196.1 km (121.9 mi)

Stage 14 result

	Rider	Team	Time
1	Robert Gesink (NED)	LottoNL–Jumbo	5h 43' 24"
2	Kenny Elissonde (FRA)	FDJ	+ 7"
3	Egor Silin (RUS)	Team Katusha	+ 9"
4	George Bennett (NZL)	LottoNL–Jumbo	+ 31"
5	Simon Yates (GBR)	Orica–BikeExchange	+ 39"
6	Haimar Zubeldia (ESP)	Trek–Segafredo	+ 49"
7	Jan Bakelants (BEL)	AG2R La Mondiale	+ 1' 11"
8	Andrew Talansky (USA)	Cannondale–Drapac	+ 1' 14"
9	Esteban Chaves (COL)	Orica–BikeExchange	+ 1' 14"
10	Leopold König (CZE)	Team Sky	+ 1' 16"

General classification after stage 14

	Rider	Team	Time
1	Nairo Quintana (COL)	Movistar Team	58h 41' 40"
2	Chris Froome (GBR)	Team Sky	+ 54"
3	Esteban Chaves (COL)	Orica–BikeExchange	+ 2' 01"
4	Simon Yates (GBR)	Orica–BikeExchange	+ 2' 17"
5	Leopold König (CZE)	Team Sky	+ 2' 38"
6	Alberto Contador (ESP)	Tinkoff	+ 3' 28"
7	Samuel Sánchez (ESP)	BMC Racing Team	+ 3' 59"
8	Andrew Talansky (USA)	Cannondale–Drapac	+ 4' 30"
9	Michele Scarponi (ITA)	Astana	+ 5' 37"
10	Daniel Moreno (ESP)	Movistar Team	+ 5' 52"

== Stage 15 ==
4 September 2016 — Sabiñánigo – Aramon Formigal, Sallent de Gállego 118.5 km (73.6 mi)

Stage 15 result

	Rider	Team	Time
1	Gianluca Brambilla (ITA)	Etixx–Quick-Step	2h 54' 30"
2	Nairo Quintana (COL)	Movistar Team	+ 3"
3	Fabio Felline (ITA)	Trek–Segafredo	+ 25"
4	Kenny Elissonde (FRA)	FDJ	+ 28"
5	David de la Cruz (ESP)	Etixx–Quick-Step	+ 31"
6	Alberto Contador (ESP)	Tinkoff	+ 34"
7	Davide Formolo (ITA)	Cannondale–Drapac	+ 53"
8	Matvey Mamykin (RUS)	Team Katusha	+ 1' 16"
9	Esteban Chaves (COL)	Orica–BikeExchange	+ 1' 53"
10	Michele Scarponi (ITA)	Astana	+ 1' 59"

General classification after stage 15

	Rider	Team	Time
1	Nairo Quintana (COL)	Movistar Team	61h 36' 07"
2	Chris Froome (GBR)	Team Sky	+ 3' 37"
3	Esteban Chaves (COL)	Orica–BikeExchange	+ 3' 57"
4	Alberto Contador (ESP)	Tinkoff	+ 4' 02"
5	Simon Yates (GBR)	Orica–BikeExchange	+ 5' 07"
6	Samuel Sánchez (ESP)	BMC Racing Team	+ 6' 12"
7	Andrew Talansky (USA)	Cannondale–Drapac	+ 6' 43"
8	Davide Formolo (ITA)	Cannondale–Drapac	+ 7' 17"
9	David de la Cruz (ESP)	Etixx–Quick-Step	+ 7' 23"
10	Michele Scarponi (ITA)	Astana	+ 7' 39"

== Stage 16 ==
5 September 2016 — Alcañiz – Peñiscola 156.4 km (97.2 mi)

Stage 16 result

	Rider	Team	Time
1	Jempy Drucker (LUX)	BMC Racing Team	3h 21' 18"
2	Rüdiger Selig (GER)	Bora–Argon 18	s.t.
3	Nikias Arndt (GER)	Team Giant–Alpecin	s.t.
4	Gianni Meersman (BEL)	Etixx–Quick-Step	s.t.
5	Lorrenzo Manzin (FRA)	FDJ	s.t.
6	Jonas van Genechten (BEL)	IAM Cycling	s.t.
7	Kristian Sbaragli (ITA)	Team Dimension Data	s.t.
8	Kiel Reijnen (USA)	Trek–Segafredo	s.t.
9	Tosh Van der Sande (BEL)	Lotto–Soudal	s.t.
10	Jhonatan Restrepo (COL)	Team Katusha	s.t.

General classification after stage 16

	Rider	Team	Time
1	Nairo Quintana (COL)	Movistar Team	64h 56' 27"
2	Chris Froome (GBR)	Team Sky	+ 3' 37"
3	Esteban Chaves (COL)	Orica–BikeExchange	+ 3' 57"
4	Alberto Contador (ESP)	Tinkoff	+ 4' 02"
5	Simon Yates (GBR)	Orica–BikeExchange	+ 5' 07"
6	Samuel Sánchez (ESP)	BMC Racing Team	+ 6' 12"
7	Andrew Talansky (USA)	Cannondale–Drapac	+ 6' 43"
8	Davide Formolo (ITA)	Cannondale–Drapac	+ 7' 17"
9	David de la Cruz (ESP)	Etixx–Quick-Step	+ 7' 23"
10	Michele Scarponi (ITA)	Astana	+ 7' 39"

== Stage 17 ==
7 September 2016 — Castellón – Lluenca, Mas de la Costa 177.5 km (110.3 mi)

Stage 17 result

	Rider	Team	Time
1	Mathias Frank (SUI)	IAM Cycling	4h 34' 38"
2	Leopold König (CZE)	Team Sky	+ 6"
3	Robert Gesink (NED)	LottoNL–Jumbo	+ 11"
4	Pello Bilbao (ESP)	Caja Rural–Seguros RGA	+ 14"
5	Dario Cataldo (ITA)	Astana	+ 16"
6	José Herrada (ESP)	Movistar Team	+ 29"
7	Axel Domont (FRA)	AG2R La Mondiale	+ 48"
8	Bart De Clercq (BEL)	Lotto–Soudal	+ 57"
9	Kristijan Đurasek (CRO)	Lampre–Merida	+ 1' 02"
10	Haimar Zubeldia (ESP)	Trek–Segafredo	+ 1' 04"

General classification after stage 17

	Rider	Team	Time
1	Nairo Quintana (COL)	Movistar Team	69h 35' 32"
2	Chris Froome (GBR)	Team Sky	+ 3' 37"
3	Esteban Chaves (COL)	Orica–BikeExchange	+ 3' 57"
4	Alberto Contador (ESP)	Tinkoff	+ 4' 02"
5	Simon Yates (GBR)	Orica–BikeExchange	+ 6' 03"
6	Andrew Talansky (USA)	Cannondale–Drapac	+ 7' 34"
7	Samuel Sánchez (ESP)	BMC Racing Team	+ 8' 12"
8	Davide Formolo (ITA)	Cannondale–Drapac	+ 8' 13"
9	Michele Scarponi (ITA)	Astana	+ 8' 28"
10	David de la Cruz (ESP)	Etixx–Quick-Step	+ 8' 52"

== Stage 18 ==
8 September 2016 — Requena – Gandia 200.6 km (124.6 mi)

Stage 18 result

	Rider	Team	Time
1	Magnus Cort Nielsen (DEN)	Orica–BikeExchange	4h 54' 31"
2	Nikias Arndt (GER)	Team Giant–Alpecin	s.t.
3	Jempy Drucker (LUX)	BMC Racing Team	s.t.
4	Daniele Bennati (ITA)	Tinkoff	s.t.
5	Jonas van Genechten (BEL)	IAM Cycling	s.t.
6	Kiel Reijnen (USA)	Trek–Segafredo	s.t.
7	Michael Schwarzmann (GER)	Bora–Argon 18	s.t.
8	Gianni Meersman (BEL)	Etixx–Quick-Step	s.t.
9	Kristian Sbaragli (ITA)	Team Dimension Data	s.t.
10	Lorrenzo Manzin (FRA)	FDJ	s.t.

General classification after stage 18

	Rider	Team	Time
1	Nairo Quintana (COL)	Movistar Team	74h 30' 03"
2	Chris Froome (GBR)	Team Sky	+ 3' 37"
3	Esteban Chaves (COL)	Orica–BikeExchange	+ 3' 57"
4	Alberto Contador (ESP)	Tinkoff	+ 4' 02"
5	Simon Yates (GBR)	Orica–BikeExchange	+ 6' 03"
6	Andrew Talansky (USA)	Cannondale–Drapac	+ 7' 34"
7	Samuel Sánchez (ESP)	BMC Racing Team	+ 8' 12"
8	Davide Formolo (ITA)	Cannondale–Drapac	+ 8' 13"
9	Michele Scarponi (ITA)	Astana	+ 8' 28"
10	David de la Cruz (ESP)	Etixx–Quick-Step	+ 8' 52"

== Stage 19 ==
9 September 2016 — Xàbia – Calp 37.5 km (23.3 mi), individual time trial (ITT)

Stage 19 result

	Rider	Team	Time
1	Chris Froome (GBR)	Team Sky	46' 33"
2	Jonathan Castroviejo (ESP)	Movistar Team	+ 44"
3	Tobias Ludvigsson (SWE)	Team Giant–Alpecin	+ 1' 24"
4	Yves Lampaert (BEL)	Etixx–Quick-Step	+ 1' 26"
5	Victor Campenaerts (BEL)	LottoNL–Jumbo	+ 1' 47"
6	Leopold König (CZE)	Team Sky	+ 1' 51"
7	Andrew Talansky (USA)	Cannondale–Drapac	+ 1' 54"
8	Alberto Contador (ESP)	Tinkoff	+ 1' 57"
9	Fabio Felline (ITA)	Trek–Segafredo	+ 1' 58"
10	Luis León Sánchez (ESP)	Astana	+ 2' 10"

General classification after stage 19

	Rider	Team	Time
1	Nairo Quintana (COL)	Movistar Team	75h 18' 52"
2	Chris Froome (GBR)	Team Sky	+ 1' 21"
3	Alberto Contador (ESP)	Tinkoff	+ 3' 43"
4	Esteban Chaves (COL)	Orica–BikeExchange	+ 4' 54"
5	Andrew Talansky (USA)	Cannondale–Drapac	+ 7' 12"
6	Simon Yates (GBR)	Orica–BikeExchange	+ 7' 32"
7	Michele Scarponi (ITA)	Astana	+ 10' 01"
8	Daniel Moreno (ESP)	Movistar Team	+ 10' 07"
9	David de la Cruz (ESP)	Etixx–Quick-Step	+ 10' 11"
10	Davide Formolo (ITA)	Cannondale–Drapac	+ 11' 14"

== Stage 20 ==
10 September 2016 — Benidorm – Aito de Aitana 193.2 km (120.0 mi)

Stage 20 result

	Rider	Team	Time
1	Pierre Latour (FRA)	AG2R La Mondiale	5h 19' 41"
2	Darwin Atapuma (COL)	BMC Racing Team	+ 2"
3	Fabio Felline (ITA)	Trek–Segafredo	+ 17"
4	Mathias Frank (SUI)	IAM Cycling	+ 40"
5	Robert Gesink (NED)	LottoNL–Jumbo	+ 1' 03"
6	Bart De Clercq (BEL)	Lotto–Soudal	+ 1' 28"
7	Rudy Molard (FRA)	Cofidis	+ 2' 02"
8	Lilian Calmejane (FRA)	Direct Énergie	+ 3' 01"
9	Esteban Chaves (COL)	Orica–BikeExchange	+ 3' 17"
10	Nairo Quintana (COL)	Movistar Team	+ 4' 03"

General classification after stage 20

	Rider	Team	Time
1	Nairo Quintana (COL)	Movistar Team	80h 42' 36"
2	Chris Froome (GBR)	Team Sky	+ 1' 23"
3	Esteban Chaves (COL)	Orica–BikeExchange	+ 4' 08"
4	Alberto Contador (ESP)	Tinkoff	+ 4' 21"
5	Andrew Talansky (USA)	Cannondale–Drapac	+ 7' 43"
6	Simon Yates (GBR)	Orica–BikeExchange	+ 8' 33"
7	David de la Cruz (ESP)	Etixx–Quick-Step	+ 11' 18"
8	Daniel Moreno (ESP)	Movistar Team	+ 13' 04"
9	Davide Formolo (ITA)	Cannondale–Drapac	+ 13' 17"
10	George Bennett (NZL)	LottoNL–Jumbo	+ 14' 07"

== Stage 21 ==
11 September 2016 — Las Rozas – Madrid 104.1 km (64.7 mi)

Stage 21 result

	Rider	Team	Time
1	Magnus Cort (DEN)	Orica–BikeExchange	2h 48' 52"
2	Daniele Bennati (ITA)	Tinkoff	s.t.
3	Gianni Meersman (BEL)	Etixx–Quick-Step	s.t.
4	Kristian Sbaragli (ITA)	Team Dimension Data	s.t.
5	Nikias Arndt (GER)	Team Giant–Alpecin	s.t.
6	Lorrenzo Manzin (FRA)	FDJ	s.t.
7	Romain Hardy (FRA)	Cofidis	s.t.
8	Jhonatan Restrepo (COL)	Team Katusha	s.t.
9	Rüdiger Selig (GER)	Bora–Argon 18	s.t.
10	Salvatore Puccio (ITA)	Team Sky	s.t.

General classification after stage 21

	Rider	Team	Time
1	Nairo Quintana (COL)	Movistar Team	83h 31' 28"
2	Chris Froome (GBR)	Team Sky	+ 1' 23"
3	Esteban Chaves (COL)	Orica–BikeExchange	+ 4' 08"
4	Alberto Contador (ESP)	Tinkoff	+ 4' 21"
5	Andrew Talansky (USA)	Cannondale–Drapac	+ 7' 43"
6	Simon Yates (GBR)	Orica–BikeExchange	+ 8' 33"
7	David de la Cruz (ESP)	Etixx–Quick-Step	+ 11' 18"
8	Daniel Moreno (ESP)	Movistar Team	+ 13' 04"
9	Davide Formolo (ITA)	Cannondale–Drapac	+ 13' 17"
10	George Bennett (NZL)	LottoNL–Jumbo	+ 14' 07"
