= 2016 Vuelta a España, Stage 1 to Stage 11 =

Cycling race stages

The 2016 Vuelta a España began on 21 August, with Stage 21 scheduled for 11 September. The 2016 edition of the cycle race began with the only team time trial stage of the race, just outside Ourense.

== Classification standings ==
Legend (Note: Jerseys appearing in the table on the left of the page indicate those worn by the cyclist during the particular stage, while those appearing in the table on the right of the page indicate those awarded to the cyclist after the stage.)
Red jersey	Denotes the leader of the general classification	Green jersey	Denotes the leader of the points classification
Blue polka dot jersey	Denotes the leader of the mountains classification	White jersey	Denotes the leader of the combination rider classification

== Stage 1 ==
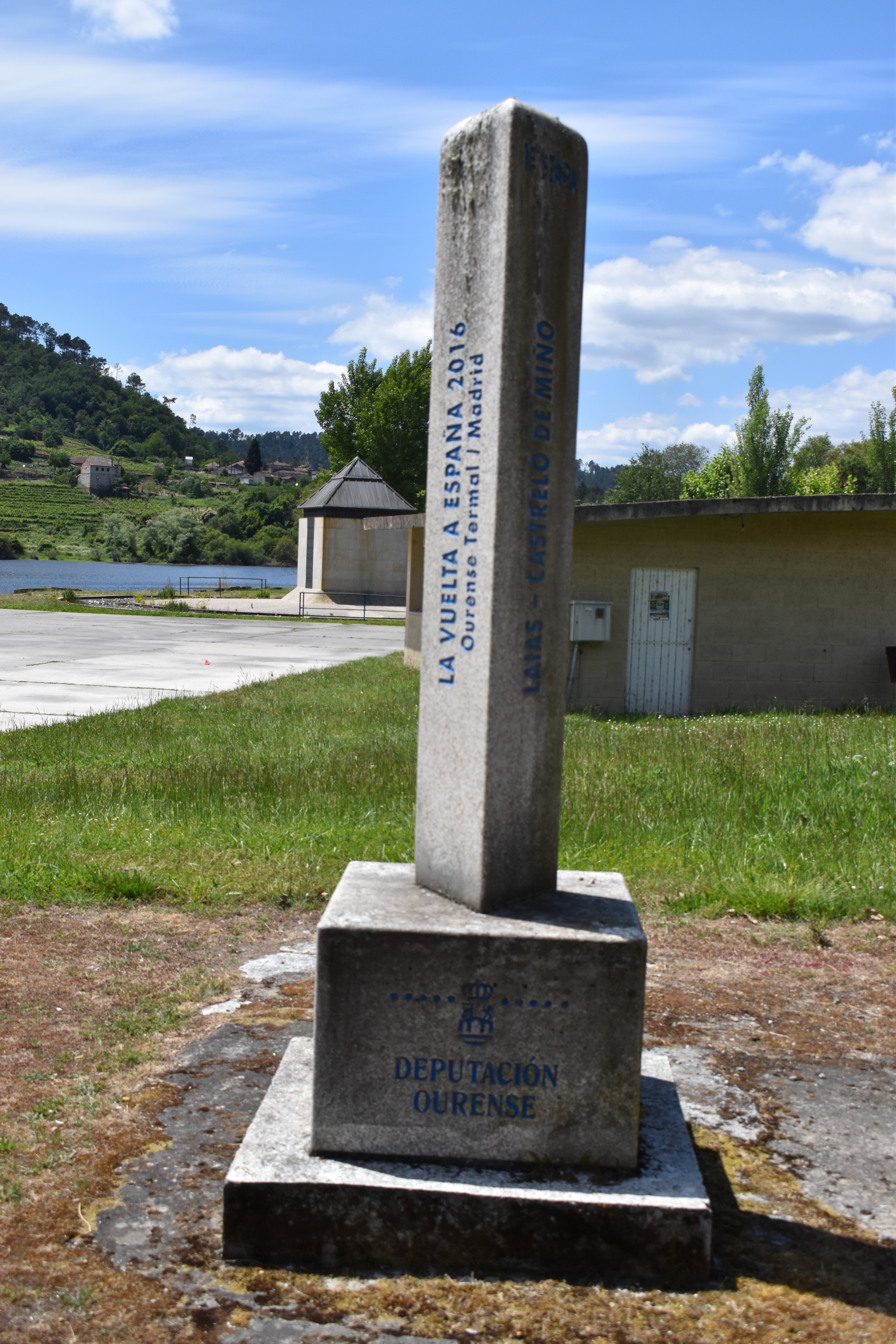
Departure point in Laias, Cenlle.

20 August 2016 — Ourense – Parque Náutico Castrelo de Miño, 27.8 km (17.3 mi), team time trial (TTT)

Stage 1 result

	Team	Time
1	Team Sky	30' 37"
2	Movistar Team	+ 0"
3	Orica–BikeExchange	+ 6"
4	BMC Racing Team	+ 7"
5	Etixx–Quick-Step	+ 22"
6	LottoNL–Jumbo	+ 27"
7	Trek–Segafredo	+ 50"
8	Cannondale–Drapac	+ 52"
9	Tinkoff	+ 52"
10	Bora–Argon 18	+ 57"

General classification after stage 1

	Rider	Team	Time
1	Peter Kennaugh (GBR)	Team Sky	30' 37"
2	Salvatore Puccio (ITA)	Team Sky	+ 0"
3	Michał Kwiatkowski (POL)	Team Sky	+ 0"
4	Leopold König (CZE)	Team Sky	+ 0"
5	Chris Froome (GBR)	Team Sky	+ 0"
6	Alejandro Valverde (ESP)	Movistar Team	+ 0"
7	Jonathan Castroviejo (ESP)	Movistar Team	+ 0"
8	Rubén Fernández (ESP)	Movistar Team	+ 0"
9	José Joaquín Rojas (ESP)	Movistar Team	+ 0"
10	Nairo Quintana (COL)	Movistar Team	+ 0"

== Stage 2 ==
21 August 2016 — Ourense – Baiona, 160.8 km (99.9 mi)

Stage 2 result

	Rider	Team	Time
1	Gianni Meersman (BEL)	Etixx–Quick-Step	4h 16' 39"
2	Michael Schwarzmann (GER)	Bora–Argon 18	s.t.
3	Magnus Cort Nielsen (DEN)	Orica–BikeExchange	s.t.
4	Michał Kwiatkowski (POL)	Team Sky	s.t.
5	Jonas van Genechten (BEL)	IAM Cycling	s.t.
6	Kristian Sbaragli (ITA)	Team Dimension Data	s.t.
7	Niccolò Bonifazio (ITA)	Trek–Segafredo	s.t.
8	Jhonatan Restrepo (COL)	Team Katusha	s.t.
9	Jempy Drucker (LUX)	BMC Racing Team	s.t.
10	Lorrenzo Manzin (FRA)	FDJ	s.t.

General classification after stage 2

	Rider	Team	Time
1	Michał Kwiatkowski (POL)	Team Sky	4h 47' 16"
2	José Joaquín Rojas (ESP)	Movistar Team	+ 0"
3	Alejandro Valverde (ESP)	Movistar Team	+ 0"
4	Chris Froome (GBR)	Team Sky	+ 0"
5	Salvatore Puccio (ITA)	Team Sky	+ 0"
6	Peter Kennaugh (GBR)	Team Sky	+ 0"
7	Nairo Quintana (COL)	Movistar Team	+ 0"
8	Leopold König (CZE)	Team Sky	+ 0"
9	Rubén Fernández (ESP)	Movistar Team	+ 0"
10	Jonathan Castroviejo (ESP)	Movistar Team	+ 0"

== Stage 3 ==
22 August 2016 — Marín – Dumbría, Mirador de Ézaro, 176.4 km (109.6 mi)

Stage 3 result

	Rider	Team	Time
1	Alexandre Geniez (FRA)	FDJ	4h 28' 36"
2	Rubén Fernández (ESP)	Movistar Team	+ 21"
3	Alejandro Valverde (ESP)	Movistar Team	+ 26"
4	Chris Froome (GBR)	Team Sky	+ 26"
5	Esteban Chaves (COL)	Orica–BikeExchange	+ 26"
6	Nairo Quintana (COL)	Movistar Team	+ 32"
7	Igor Antón (ESP)	Team Dimension Data	+ 32"
8	Samuel Sánchez (ESP)	BMC Racing Team	+ 54"
9	Alberto Contador (ESP)	Tinkoff	+ 54"
10	Gianluca Brambilla (ITA)	Etixx–Quick-Step	+ 54"

General classification after stage 3

	Rider	Team	Time
1	Rubén Fernández (ESP)	Movistar Team	9h 16' 07"
2	Alejandro Valverde (ESP)	Movistar Team	+ 7"
3	Chris Froome (GBR)	Team Sky	+ 11"
4	Esteban Chaves (COL)	Orica–BikeExchange	+ 17"
5	Nairo Quintana (COL)	Movistar Team	+ 17"
6	Samuel Sánchez (ESP)	BMC Racing Team	+ 46"
7	Peter Kennaugh (GBR)	Team Sky	+ 47"
8	Leopold König (CZE)	Team Sky	+ 51"
9	Daniel Moreno (ESP)	Movistar Team	+ 58"
10	Gianluca Brambilla (ITA)	Etixx–Quick-Step	+ 1' 01"

== Stage 4 ==
23 August 2016 — Betanzos – San Andrés de Teixido, 163.5 km (101.6 mi)

Stage 4 result

	Rider	Team	Time
1	Lilian Calmejane (FRA)	Direct Énergie	4h 05' 19"
2	Darwin Atapuma (COL)	BMC Racing Team	+ 15"
3	Ben King (USA)	Cannondale–Drapac	+ 15"
4	Andrey Zeits (KAZ)	Astana	+ 19"
5	Nathan Haas (AUS)	Team Dimension Data	+ 23"
6	Enrico Battaglin (ITA)	LottoNL–Jumbo	+ 24"
7	Pierre Rolland (FRA)	Cannondale–Drapac	+ 33"
8	Chad Haga (USA)	Team Giant–Alpecin	+ 37"
9	Jaime Rosón (ESP)	Caja Rural–Seguros RGA	+ 40"
10	Cesare Benedetti (ITA)	Bora–Argon 18	+ 42"

General classification after stage 4

	Rider	Team	Time
1	Darwin Atapuma (COL)	BMC Racing Team	13h 23' 10"
2	Alejandro Valverde (ESP)	Movistar Team	+ 29"
3	Chris Froome (GBR)	Team Sky	+ 33"
4	Esteban Chaves (COL)	Orica–BikeExchange	+ 39"
5	Nairo Quintana (COL)	Movistar Team	+ 39"
6	Samuel Sánchez (ESP)	BMC Racing Team	+ 1' 08"
7	Rubén Fernández (ESP)	Movistar Team	+ 1' 11"
8	Leopold König (CZE)	Team Sky	+ 1' 13"
9	Peter Kennaugh (GBR)	Team Sky	+ 1' 15"
10	Gianluca Brambilla (ITA)	Etixx–Quick-Step	+ 1' 23"

== Stage 5 ==
24 August 2016 — Viveiro – Lugo, 171.3 km (106.4 mi)

Stage 5 result

	Rider	Team	Time
1	Gianni Meersman (BEL)	Etixx–Quick-Step	4h 16' 42"
2	Fabio Felline (ITA)	Trek–Segafredo	s.t.
3	Kévin Reza (FRA)	FDJ	s.t.
4	Luis León Sánchez (ESP)	Astana	s.t.
5	Zico Waeytens (BEL)	Team Giant–Alpecin	s.t.
6	Alejandro Valverde (ESP)	Movistar Team	s.t.
7	Romain Hardy (FRA)	Cofidis	s.t.
8	Jempy Drucker (LUX)	BMC Racing Team	s.t.
9	Kenneth Vanbilsen (BEL)	Cofidis	s.t.
10	José Gonçalves (POR)	Caja Rural–Seguros RGA	s.t.

General classification after stage 5

	Rider	Team	Time
1	Darwin Atapuma (COL)	BMC Racing Team	17h 39' 52"
2	Alejandro Valverde (ESP)	Movistar Team	+ 28"
3	Chris Froome (GBR)	Team Sky	+ 32"
4	Esteban Chaves (COL)	Orica–BikeExchange	+ 38"
5	Nairo Quintana (COL)	Movistar Team	+ 38"
6	Samuel Sánchez (ESP)	BMC Racing Team	+ 1' 07"
7	Rubén Fernández (ESP)	Movistar Team	+ 1' 10"
8	Leopold König (CZE)	Team Sky	+ 1' 12"
9	Peter Kennaugh (GBR)	Team Sky	+ 1' 14"
10	Gianluca Brambilla (ITA)	Etixx–Quick-Step	+ 1' 22"

== Stage 6 ==
25 August 2016 — Monforte de Lemos – Ribeira Sacra, Luintra, 163.2 km (101.4 mi)

Stage 6 result

	Rider	Team	Time
1	Simon Yates (GBR)	Orica–BikeExchange	4h 05' 00"
2	Luis León Sánchez (ESP)	Astana	+ 20"
3	Fabio Felline (ITA)	Trek–Segafredo	+ 22"
4	Ben Hermans (BEL)	BMC Racing Team	+ 22"
5	Kenny Elissonde (FRA)	FDJ	+ 22"
6	Daniel Moreno (ESP)	Movistar Team	+ 22"
7	Mathias Frank (SUI)	IAM Cycling	+ 22"
8	Alejandro Valverde (ESP)	Movistar Team	+ 29"
9	Romain Hardy (FRA)	Cofidis	+ 29"
10	Simon Clarke (AUS)	Cannondale–Drapac	+ 29"

General classification after stage 6

	Rider	Team	Time
1	Darwin Atapuma (COL)	BMC Racing Team	21h 45' 21"
2	Alejandro Valverde (ESP)	Movistar Team	+ 28"
3	Chris Froome (GBR)	Team Sky	+ 32"
4	Esteban Chaves (COL)	Orica–BikeExchange	+ 38"
5	Nairo Quintana (COL)	Movistar Team	+ 38"
6	Samuel Sánchez (ESP)	BMC Racing Team	+ 1' 07"
7	Leopold König (CZE)	Team Sky	+ 1' 12"
8	Peter Kennaugh (GBR)	Team Sky	+ 1' 14"
9	Gianluca Brambilla (ITA)	Etixx–Quick-Step	+ 1' 22"
10	Simon Yates (GBR)	Orica–BikeExchange	+ 1' 28"

== Stage 7 ==
26 August 2016 — Maceda – Puebla de Sanabria, 158.5 km (98.5 mi)

Stage 7 result

	Rider	Team	Time
1	Jonas van Genechten (BEL)	IAM Cycling	3h 55' 44"
2	Daniele Bennati (ITA)	Tinkoff	s.t.
3	Alejandro Valverde (ESP)	Movistar Team	s.t.
4	Philippe Gilbert (BEL)	BMC Racing Team	s.t.
5	Kévin Reza (FRA)	FDJ	s.t.
6	Gediminas Bagdonas (LTU)	AG2R La Mondiale	s.t.
7	Gianni Meersman (BEL)	Etixx–Quick-Step	s.t.
8	Kristian Sbaragli (ITA)	Team Dimension Data	s.t.
9	Romain Hardy (FRA)	Cofidis	s.t.
10	Tosh Van der Sande (BEL)	Lotto–Soudal	s.t.

General classification after stage 7

	Rider	Team	Time
1	Darwin Atapuma (COL)	BMC Racing Team	25h 41' 21"
2	Alejandro Valverde (ESP)	Movistar Team	+ 24"
3	Chris Froome (GBR)	Team Sky	+ 32"
4	Esteban Chaves (COL)	Orica–BikeExchange	+ 38"
5	Nairo Quintana (COL)	Movistar Team	+ 38"
6	Samuel Sánchez (ESP)	BMC Racing Team	+ 1' 07"
7	Leopold König (CZE)	Team Sky	+ 1' 12"
8	Peter Kennaugh (GBR)	Team Sky	+ 1' 14"
9	Gianluca Brambilla (ITA)	Etixx–Quick-Step	+ 1' 22"
10	Simon Yates (GBR)	Orica–BikeExchange	+ 1' 28"

== Stage 8 ==
27 August 2016 — Villalpando – La Camperona, Valle de Sabero, 181.5 km (112.8 mi)

Stage 8 result

	Rider	Team	Time
1	Sergey Lagutin (RUS)	Team Katusha	4h 09' 30"
2	Axel Domont (FRA)	AG2R La Mondiale	+ 10"
3	Perrig Quéméneur (FRA)	Direct Énergie	+ 17"
4	Mattia Cattaneo (ITA)	Lampre–Merida	+ 24"
5	Pieter Serry (BEL)	Etixx–Quick-Step	+ 40"
6	Jacques Janse van Rensburg (RSA)	Team Dimension Data	+ 55"
7	Scott Thwaites (GBR)	Bora–Argon 18	+ 1' 11"
8	Gatis Smukulis (LAT)	Astana	+ 1' 30"
9	Jhonatan Restrepo (COL)	Team Katusha	+ 1' 30"
10	Loïc Chetout (FRA)	Cofidis	+ 1' 44"

General classification after stage 8

	Rider	Team	Time
1	Nairo Quintana (COL)	Movistar Team	29h 55' 54"
2	Alejandro Valverde (ESP)	Movistar Team	+ 19"
3	Chris Froome (GBR)	Team Sky	+ 27"
4	Esteban Chaves (COL)	Orica–BikeExchange	+ 57"
5	Leopold König (CZE)	Team Sky	+ 1' 16"
6	Darwin Atapuma (COL)	BMC Racing Team	+ 1' 36"
7	Alberto Contador (ESP)	Tinkoff	+ 1' 39"
8	Daniel Moreno (ESP)	Movistar Team	+ 1' 44"
9	Gianluca Brambilla (ITA)	Etixx–Quick-Step	+ 1' 46"
10	Samuel Sánchez (ESP)	BMC Racing Team	+ 1' 46"

== Stage 9 ==
28 August 2016 — Cistierna – Alto del Naranco, Oviedo, 164.5 km (102.2 mi)

Stage 9 result

	Rider	Team	Time
1	David de la Cruz (ESP)	Etixx–Quick-Step	3h 47' 56"
2	Dries Devenyns (BEL)	IAM Cycling	+ 27"
3	Moreno Moser (ITA)	Cannondale–Drapac	+ 33"
4	Luis León Sánchez (ESP)	Astana	+ 51"
5	Mathias Frank (SUI)	IAM Cycling	+ 51"
6	Alexandre Geniez (FRA)	FDJ	+ 53"
7	Bartosz Huzarski (POL)	Bora–Argon 18	+ 58"
8	Thomas de Gendt (BEL)	Lotto–Soudal	+ 1' 04"
9	Pello Bilbao (ESP)	Caja Rural–Seguros RGA	+ 1' 04"
10	Dylan Teuns (BEL)	BMC Racing Team	+ 1' 10"

General classification after stage 9

	Rider	Team	Time
1	David de la Cruz (ESP)	Etixx–Quick-Step	34h 46' 24"
2	Nairo Quintana (COL)	Movistar Team	+ 22"
3	Alejandro Valverde (ESP)	Movistar Team	+ 41"
4	Chris Froome (GBR)	Team Sky	+ 49"
5	Esteban Chaves (COL)	Orica–BikeExchange	+ 1' 19"
6	Leopold König (CZE)	Team Sky	+ 1' 38"
7	Alberto Contador (ESP)	Tinkoff	+ 2' 01"
8	Darwin Atapuma (COL)	BMC Racing Team	+ 2' 06"
9	Gianluca Brambilla (ITA)	Etixx–Quick-Step	+ 2' 07"
10	Samuel Sánchez (ESP)	BMC Racing Team	+ 2' 08"

== Stage 10 ==
29 August 2016 — Lugones – Lagos de Covadonga, 188.7 km (117.3 mi)

Stage 10 result

	Rider	Team	Time
1	Nairo Quintana (COL)	Movistar Team	4h 50' 31"
2	Robert Gesink (NED)	LottoNL–Jumbo	+ 24"
3	Chris Froome (GBR)	Team Sky	+ 25"
4	Omar Fraile (ESP)	Team Dimension Data	+ 28"
5	Alejandro Valverde (ESP)	Movistar Team	+ 28"
6	Michele Scarponi (ITA)	Astana	+ 28"
7	Esteban Chaves (COL)	Orica–BikeExchange	+ 1' 02"
8	Alberto Contador (ESP)	Tinkoff	+ 1' 05"
9	Simon Yates (GBR)	Orica–BikeExchange	+ 1' 09"
10	Fabio Felline (ITA)	Trek–Segafredo	+ 1' 11"

General classification after stage 10

	Rider	Team	Time
1	Nairo Quintana (COL)	Movistar Team	38h 37' 07"
2	Alejandro Valverde (ESP)	Movistar Team	+ 57"
3	Chris Froome (GBR)	Team Sky	+ 58"
4	Esteban Chaves (COL)	Orica–BikeExchange	+ 2' 09"
5	Alberto Contador (ESP)	Tinkoff	+ 2' 54"
6	Leopold König (CZE)	Team Sky	+ 2' 57"
7	David de la Cruz (ESP)	Etixx–Quick-Step	+ 3' 03"
8	Simon Yates (GBR)	Orica–BikeExchange	+ 3' 06"
9	Michele Scarponi (ITA)	Astana	+ 3' 14"
10	Samuel Sánchez (ESP)	BMC Racing Team	+ 3' 20"

== Stage 11 ==
31 August 2016 — Jurassic Museum of Asturias, Colunga – Peña Cabarga, 168.2 km (104.5 mi)

Stage 11 result

	Rider	Team	Time
1	Chris Froome (GBR)	Team Sky	3h 44' 47"
2	Nairo Quintana (COL)	Movistar Team	s.t.
3	Alejandro Valverde (ESP)	Movistar Team	+ 6"
4	Leopold König (CZE)	Team Sky	+ 6"
5	Alberto Contador (ESP)	Tinkoff	+ 6"
6	Simon Yates (GBR)	Orica–BikeExchange	+ 13"
7	Michele Scarponi (ITA)	Astana	+ 14"
8	Esteban Chaves (COL)	Orica–BikeExchange	+ 19"
9	Pierre Latour (FRA)	AG2R La Mondiale	+ 22"
10	Samuel Sánchez (ESP)	BMC Racing Team	+ 30"

General classification after stage 11

	Rider	Team	Time
1	Nairo Quintana (COL)	Movistar Team	42h 21' 48"
2	Chris Froome (GBR)	Team Sky	+ 54"
3	Alejandro Valverde (ESP)	Movistar Team	+ 1' 05"
4	Esteban Chaves (COL)	Orica–BikeExchange	+ 2' 34"
5	Alberto Contador (ESP)	Tinkoff	+ 3' 08"
6	Leopold König (CZE)	Team Sky	+ 3' 09"
7	Simon Yates (GBR)	Orica–BikeExchange	+ 3' 25"
8	Michele Scarponi (ITA)	Astana	+ 3' 34"
9	David de la Cruz (ESP)	Etixx–Quick-Step	+ 3' 45"
10	Samuel Sánchez (ESP)	BMC Racing Team	+ 3' 56"
