= Nicolas Dougall =

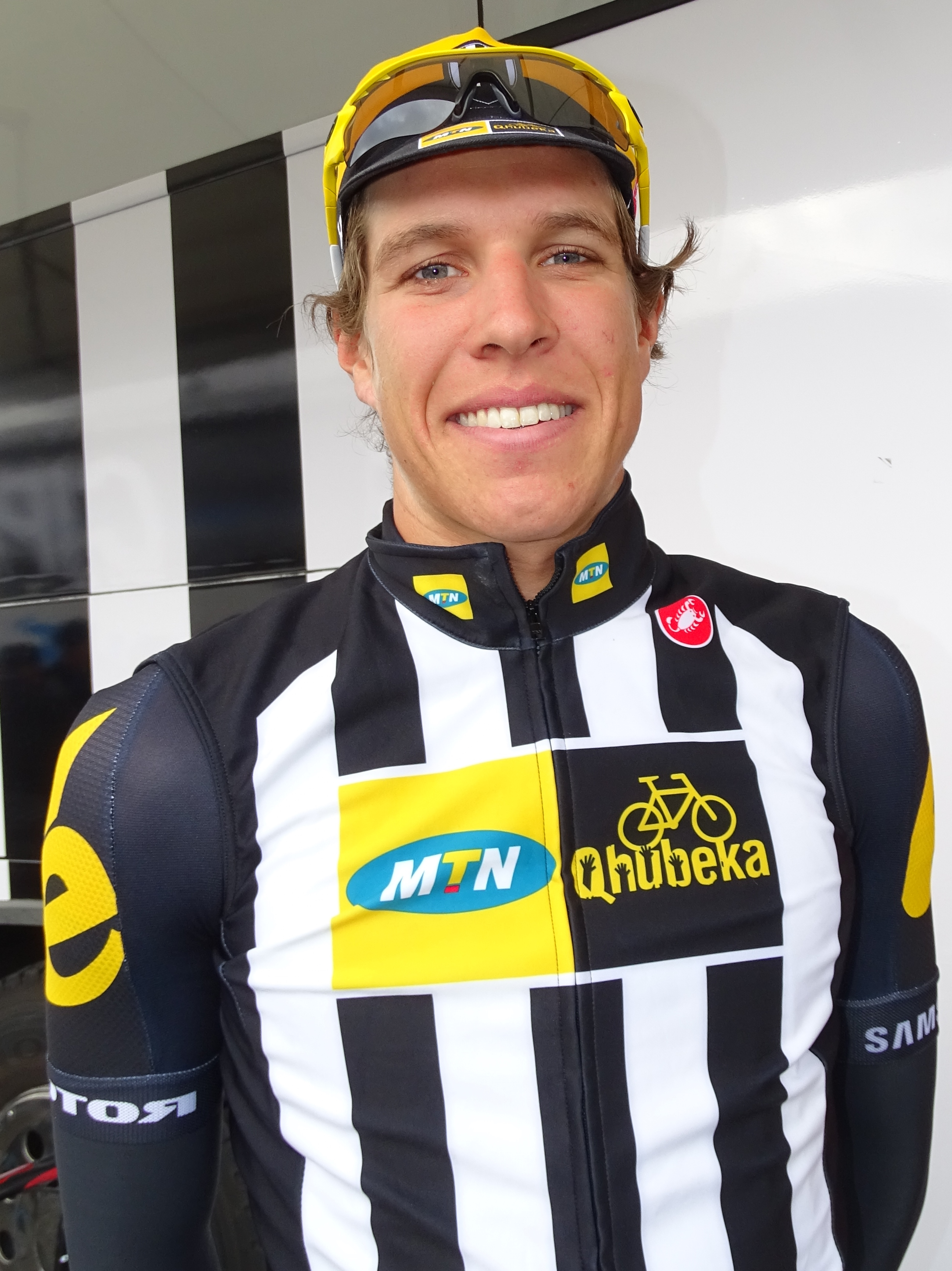
Nicolas Dougall

Nicolas Dougall (born 21 November 1992) is a South African Triathlete, and Ex professional road cyclist, who last rode for UCI WorldTeam Team Dimension Data.

Dougall was born in Hertfordshire in the United Kingdom, but grew up in Brisbane, Australia. His first Grand Tour was the 2016 Vuelta a España.

After five years with Team Dimension Data (formerly MTN - Qhubeka) Nic returned to his roots as a triathlete, with his first race being Barcelona Ironman 70.3 on Sunday 19 May 2019.

== Career achievements ==
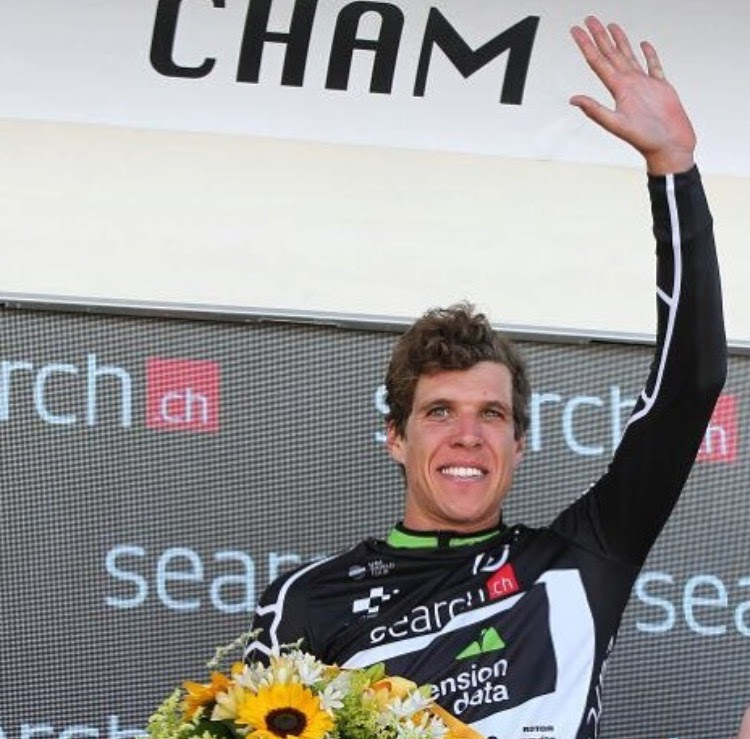
Dougall at the 2017 Tour de Suisse

=== Major results ===
2009
1st, World ITU Sprint Distance Triathlon, Queensland Australia.
2011
1st Stage 1 (TTT) Tour of Tasmania

==== 2012 ====
3rd Stage Princess Maha Chakri Sirindhorn's Cup Tour of Thailand

==== 2013 ====
7th National Championships South-Africa U23 - Road Race

2014
National Under–23 Road Championships

2nd Time trial
3rd Road race

==== 2015 ====
18th GC Tour du Poitou Charentes

5th Tour du Poitou Charentes - Youth classification

==== 2016 ====
18th World Championships - Road Race

8th Tour of Croatia - Stage 5 (TTT)

2017
5th Time trial, National Road Championships
13th Tour de Suisse - Points classification

==== 2018 ====
21st Scheldeprijs

==== 2019 ====
6th Ironman 70.3 Barcelona

=== Grand Tour general classification results timeline ===
Grand Tour	2016	2017
Giro d'Italia	—	—
Tour de France	—	—
Vuelta a España	154	DNF

Legend
—	Did not compete
DNF	Did not finish
