= Bryan Nauleau =

French road cyclist

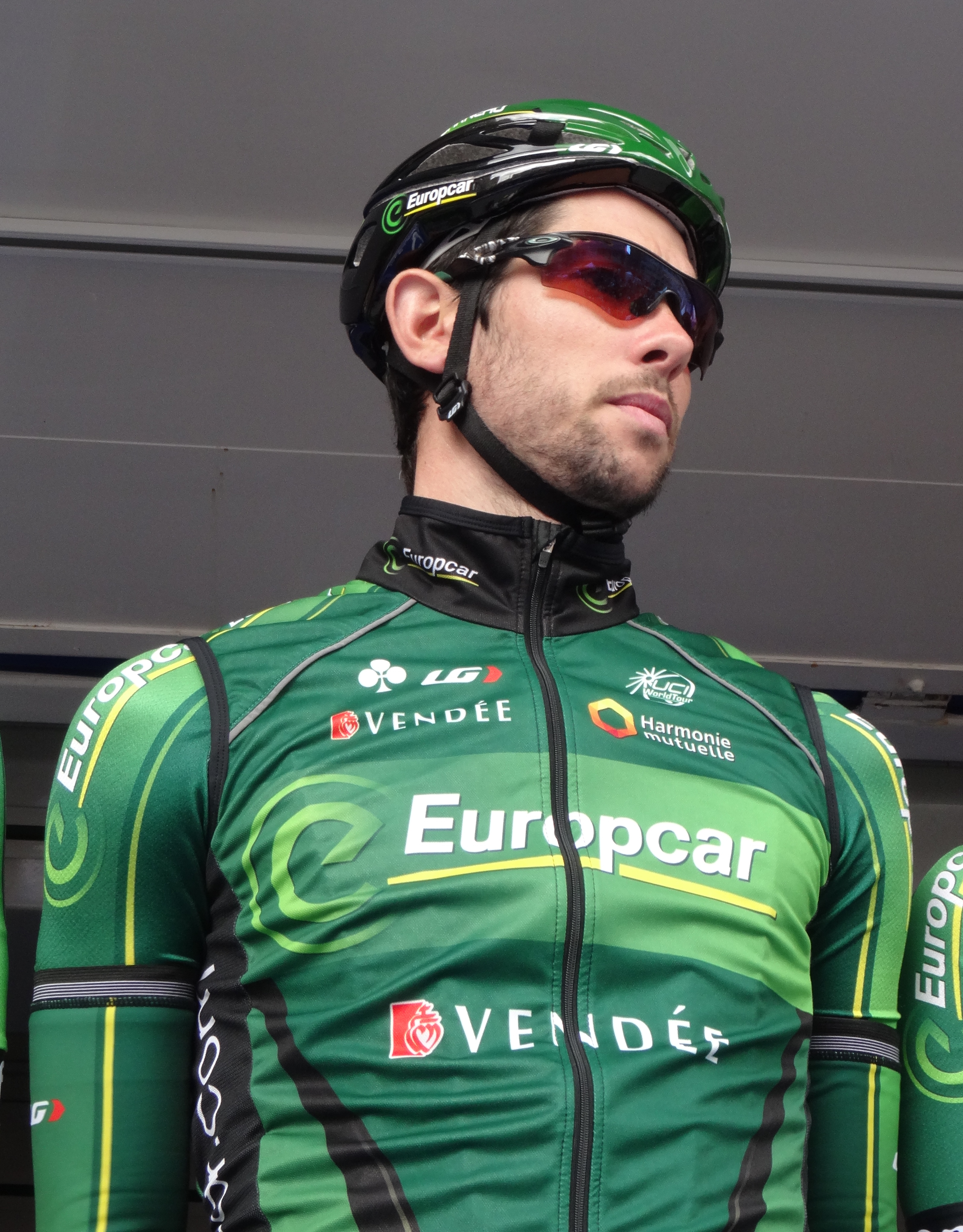
- Nauleau at the 2014 Four Days of Dunkirk

Personal information
- Full name: Bryan Nauleau
- Born: 13 March 1988 (age 38) Les Sables-d'Olonne, France

Cycling career
- Sport: Cycling
- Current team: Les Sables Vendée Cyclisme
- Disciplines: Road; Track
- Role: Rider

Amateur teams
- 2005: EC du Château d'Olonne
- 2007–2013: Vendée U
- 2011: Team Europcar (stagiaire)
- 2012: Team Europcar (stagiaire)
- 2020–: Les Sables Vendée Cyclisme

Professional team
- 2013–2019: Team Europcar

Bryan Nauleau (born 13 March 1988 in Les Sables-d'Olonne) is a French cyclist, who currently rides for French amateur team Les Sables Vendée Cyclisme. Nauleau rode professionally between 2013 and 2019, entirely for Team Europcar and its later iterations. He was named in the start list for the 2015 Tour de France.

== Major results ==
2006
2nd Team pursuit, UEC European Junior Track Championships
2008
8th Chrono des Nations U23
2009
1st Team pursuit, National Track Championships
2011
3rd Grand Prix Cristal Energie
2013
6th Overall Tour de Bretagne
2015
9th Boucles de l'Aulne
2016
7th Overall Tour de Savoie Mont-Blanc
8th Overall La Tropicale Amissa Bongo

=== Grand Tour general classification results timeline ===
Grand Tour	2014	2015	2016
Giro d'Italia	—	—	—
Tour de France	—	157	—
Vuelta a España	DNF	—	146

Legend
—	Did not compete
DNF	Did not finish
