= Loïc Chetout =

French road cyclist

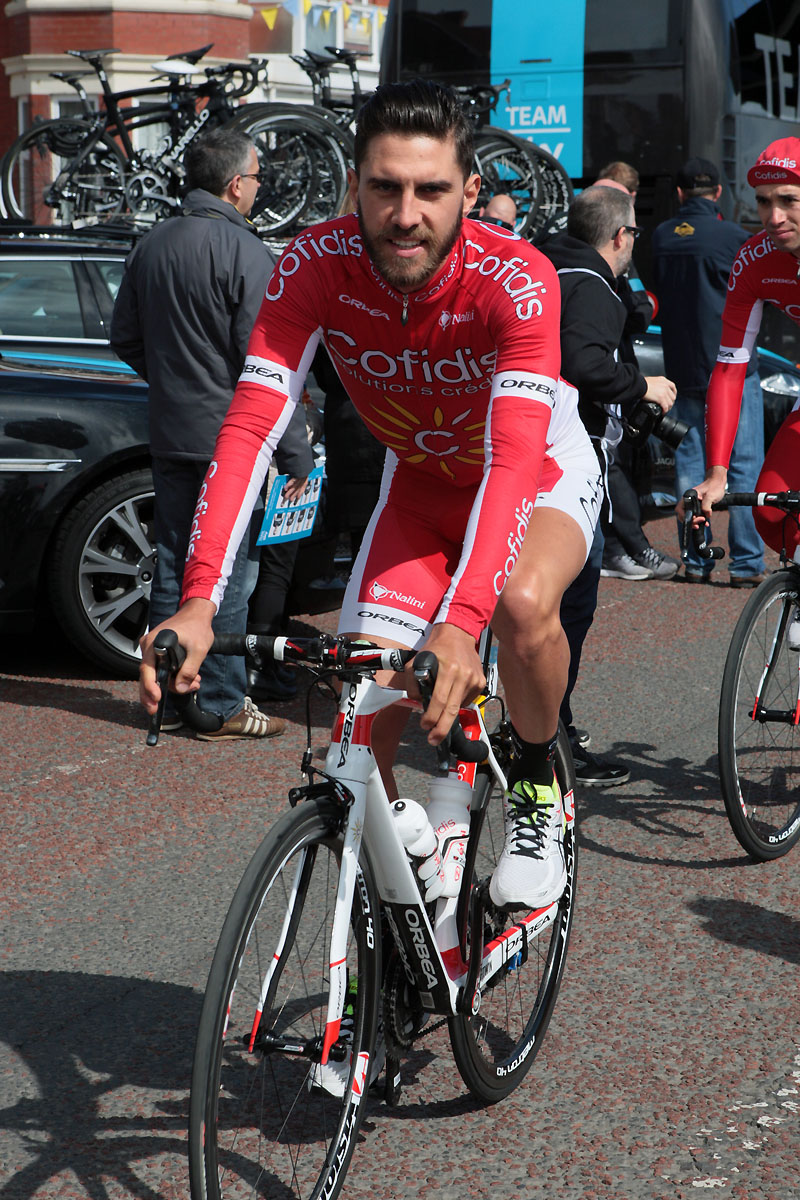
- Chetout in 2015.

Personal information
- Full name: Loïc Chetout
- Born: 23 September 1992 (age 34) Bayonne, France
- Height: 1.78 m (5 ft 10 in)

Cycling career
- Sport: Cycling
- Current team: Retired
- Discipline: Road
- Role: Rider

Amateur teams
- 2011–2013: Naturgas Energía
- 2014: GSC Blagnac Vélo Sport 31

Professional teams
- 2013: Euskadi (stagiaire)
- 2014: Cofidis (stagiaire)
- 2015–2019: Cofidis

Loïc Chetout (born 23 September 1992) is a French former professional racing cyclist, who rode professionally between 2015 and 2019 for UCI Professional Continental team Cofidis.

He made his Grand Tour début at the 2016 Vuelta a España, finishing 138th overall with one top ten placing. His first Monuments races came in 2017, riding the Tour of Flanders and Paris–Roubaix.

== Career achievements ==
=== Major results ===
2014
1st Stage 3a Ronde de l'Isard
2016
2nd Classic Loire Atlantique
8th Paris–Camembert
10th Grand Prix de Denain
2018
1st Combativity classification Tour of Oman

=== Grand Tour general classification results timeline ===
Grand Tour	2016	2017	2018
Giro d'Italia	—	—	—
Tour de France	—	—	—
Vuelta a España	138	—	144

Legend
—	Did not compete
DNF	Did not finish
