= Unipublic =

Spanish event organising agency

Unipublic is a Spanish event organising agency owned by the French sports organisation Amaury Sport Organisation (ASO). They are the organisers of Vuelta a España, an annual bicycle race held in Spain.

== History ==
Unipublic was founded in 1975 and soon specialized in elite sports, as it obtained rights to national and international TVE Sports broadcasts: rhythmic gymnastics, skiing, cycling, basketball, etc. In 1983 he participated decisively in the creation of the ACB Basketball League, and in 1987 he bought the rights to the Espanyol basketball section. The 87-88 season he continued playing under that name, and the next season it was renamed Club Baloncesto Unipublic, playing as "Grupo Ifa Barcelona". At the end of that year it merged with Granollers, playing as "Grupo Ifa Granollers" and in Granollers; Unipublic remained active with the team until 1991, when he abandoned his involvement with it. He also helped create the Larios Athletics Club, six-time European champion. The rights to events such as football and cycling were the subject of a ratings war between TVE and the first private networks in Spain.

In this context, Unipublic grew and developed its own media to maintain its independent position in relation to Spanish programming companies. In 2005 Antena 3 bought the agency, where it continued its development process in favor of its most important asset: La Vuelta a España, of which it has been the owner and main operator since 1979.

In 2008, the Amaury Sport Organization (ASO) (organizer of the Tour de France, among other sporting events in France and around the world) took over 49% of Unipublic and, later in 2014, it took over 100%, leaving ASO as its only shareholder.
