= Valerio Conti =

Italian cyclist

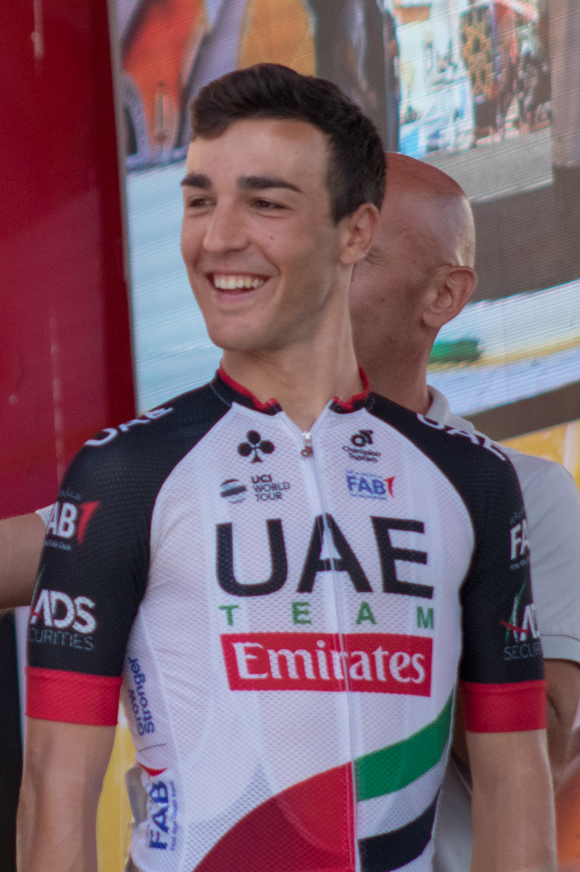
- Conti in 2018

Personal information
- Full name: Valerio Conti
- Born: 30 March 1993 (age 33) Rome, Italy
- Height: 1.72 m (5 ft 8 in)
- Weight: 60 kg (132 lb; 9 st 6 lb)

Cycling career
- Sport: Cycling
- Current team: Solution Tech NIPPO Rali
- Discipline: Road
- Role: Rider
- Rider type: Climber

Amateur team
- 2012–2013: Mastromarco-Sensi-Benedetti-Dover

Professional teams
- 2013: Lampre–Merida (stagiaire)
- 2014–2021: Lampre–Merida
- 2022: Astana Qazaqstan Team
- 2023–: Team Corratec

Major wins
- Grand Tours Vuelta a España 1 individual stage (2016) One-Day Races and Classics Gran Premio Bruno Beghelli (2014)

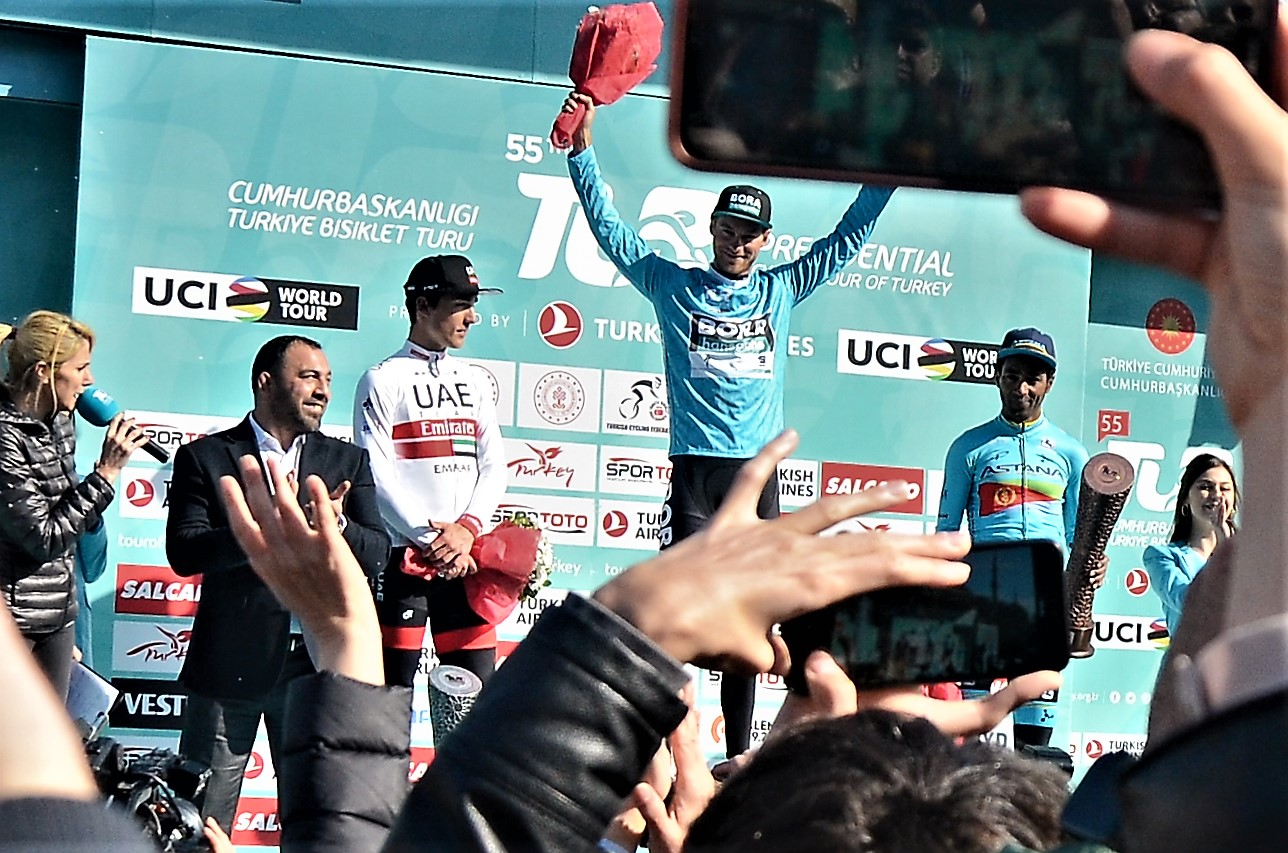
Valerio Conti of UAE Team Emirates (left), runner-up of the General classification at the 55th Presidential Cycling Tour of Turkey 2019 at the award ceremony.

Valerio Conti (born 30 March 1993) is an Italian cyclist who currently rides for UCI ProTeam Solution Tech NIPPO Rali. He has competed in every edition of the Giro d'Italia between 2016 and 2023.

== Major results ==
2010
3rd Trofeo Città di Ivrea
4th Overall Tre Ciclistica Bresciana

1st Stage 2

7th Trofeo Dorigo Porte
2011
1st Overall Tre Ciclistica Bresciana

1st Stages 1 (ITT) & 3

1st Trofeo Dorigo Porte
1st Stage 1 Trofeo Karlsberg
National Junior Road Championships

2nd Time trial
2nd Road race

3rd Overall Giro della Lunigiana
4th Road race, UEC European Junior Road Championships
2013
3rd Ruota d'Oro
5th Gran Premio Palio del Recioto
2014
1st Gran Premio Bruno Beghelli
6th Japan Cup
Vuelta a España

Held after Stages 2 & 4

2015
Tour of Japan

1st Points classification
1st Stage 6

10th Coppa Sabatini
2016
1st Stage 13 Vuelta a España
2018
5th Overall Adriatica Ionica Race
2019
2nd Overall Presidential Tour of Turkey
4th Overall Vuelta a San Juan
Giro d'Italia

Held after Stages 6–11

2020
1st Trofeo Matteotti
2021
2nd Giro dell'Appennino
2nd Gran Premio di Lugano
2023
5th Overall Tour of Hainan
9th Giro della Provincia di Reggio Calabria
2024
9th Overall Tour of Antalya

=== Grand Tour general classification results timeline ===
Grand Tour	2014	2015	2016	2017	2018	2019	2020	2021	2022	2023
Giro d'Italia	—	—	27	68	24	DNF	101	89	DNF	DNF
Tour de France	Has not contested during his career									
Vuelta a España	112	151	66	—	60	70	—	—	—	—

Legend
—	Did not compete
DNF	Did not finish
IP	Race in Progress
