= Axel Domont =

French cyclist

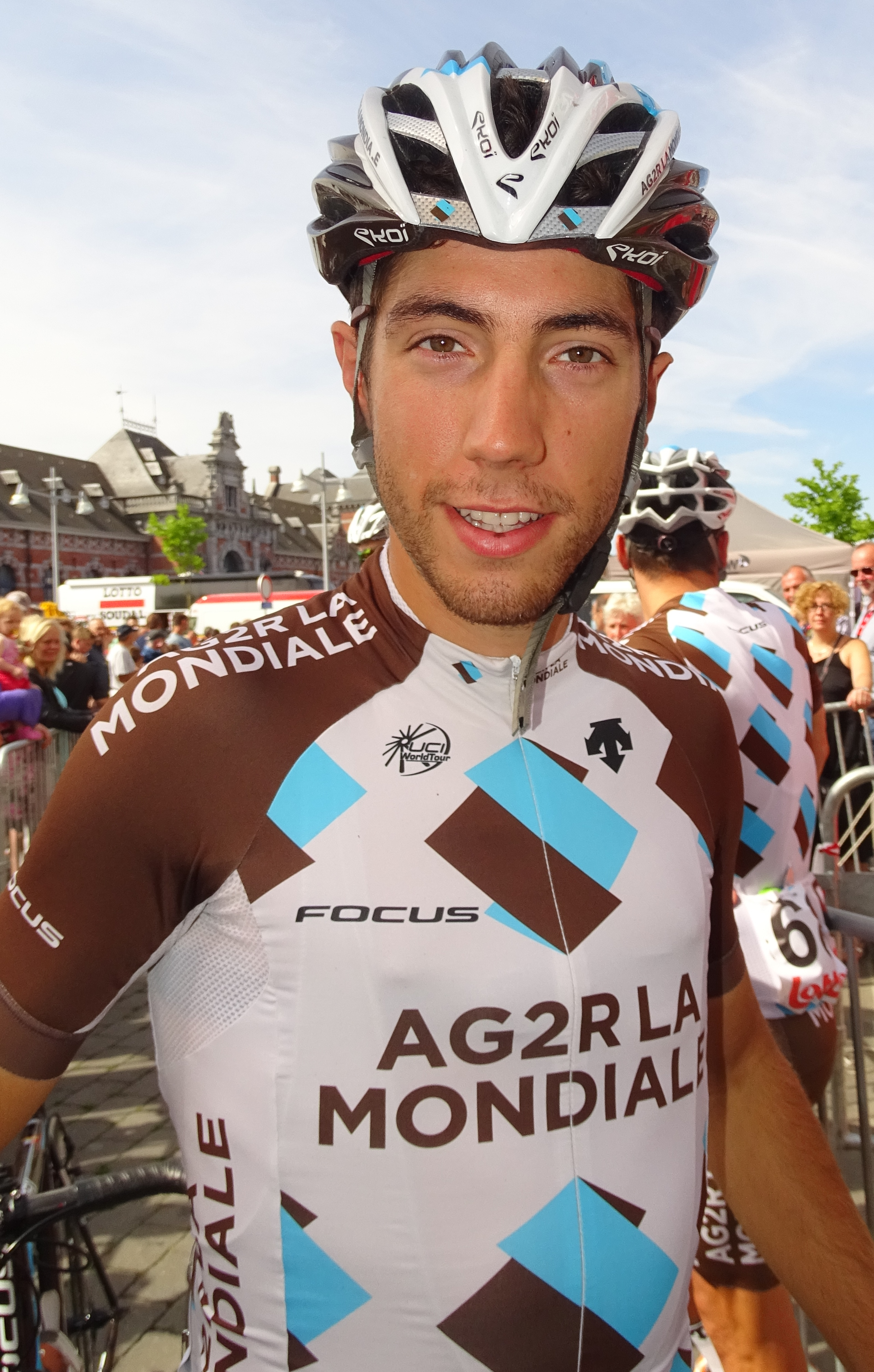
- Domont in 2015

Personal information
- Full name: Axel Domont
- Born: 7 August 1990 (age 36) Valence, France
- Height: 1.79 m (5 ft 10 in)
- Weight: 65 kg (143 lb; 10.2 st)

Cycling career
- Sport: Cycling
- Current team: Retired
- Discipline: Road
- Role: Rider
- Rider type: Climber

Amateur teams
- 2009: UC Aubenas
- 2010–2012: Chambéry CF
- 2011: Ag2r–La Mondiale (stagiaire)

Professional team
- 2013–2020: Ag2r–La Mondiale

Axel Domont (born 7 August 1990) is a French winemaker and former racing cyclist, who competed professionally between 2013 and 2020, entirely for UCI WorldTeam AG2R La Mondiale.

== Major results ==
2011
2nd Piccolo Giro di Lombardia
3rd Overall Giro del Friuli-Venezia Giulia
8th Overall Tour des Pays de Savoie
8th Overall Ronde de l'Isard
9th Road race, UEC European Under-23 Road Championships
2012
5th Overall Toscana-Terra di Ciclismo

1st Stage 5

7th Overall Ronde de l'Isard
2014
1st Stage 5 Circuit de la Sarthe
Tour du Limousin

1st Mountains classification
1st Sprints classification

1st Sprints classification Route du Sud

=== Grand Tour general classification results timeline ===
Grand Tour	2014	2015	2016	2017	2018	2019	2020
Giro d'Italia	58	75	50	—	—	—	—
Tour de France	—	—	—	68	DNF	—	—
Vuelta a España	—	—	48	DNF	—	—	DNF

Legend
—	Did not compete
DNF	Did not finish
