= Kristian Sbaragli =

Italian cyclist (born 1990)

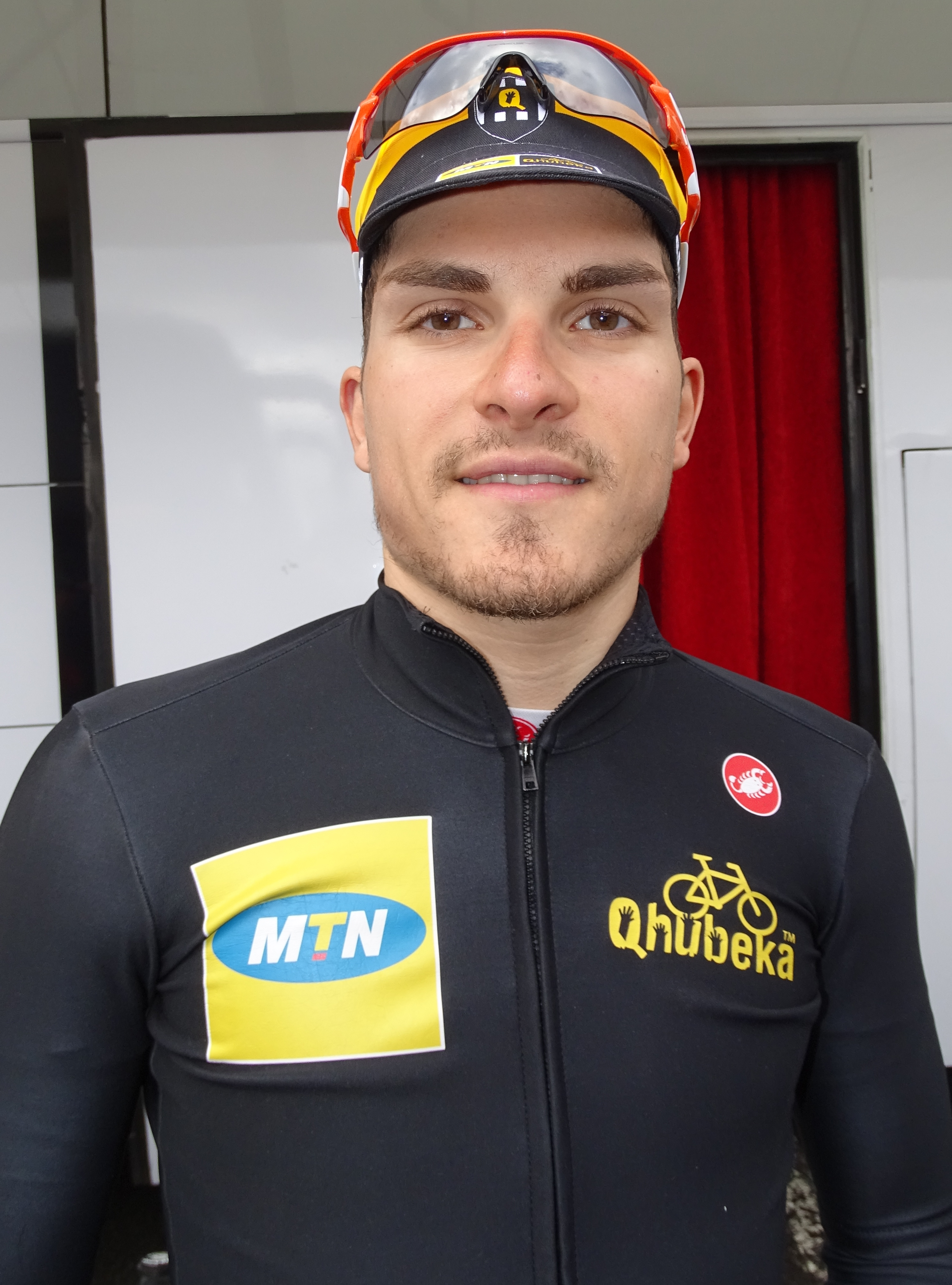
- Sbaragli in 2015

Personal information
- Born: 8 May 1990 (age 36) Empoli, Italy
- Height: 1.75 m (5 ft 9 in)
- Weight: 70 kg (154 lb)

Cycling career
- Sport: Cycling
- Current team: Solution Tech NIPPO Rali
- Discipline: Road
- Role: Rider
- Rider type: Sprinter

Amateur team
- 2009–2012: Hopplà–Seano–Bellissima

Professional teams
- 2013–2017: MTN–Qhubeka
- 2018–2019: Israel Cycling Academy
- 2020–2023: Alpecin–Deceuninck
- 2024–: Team Corratec–Vini Fantini

Major wins
- Grand Tours Vuelta a España 1 individual stage (2015)

Kristian Sbaragli (born 8 May 1990) is an Italian racing cyclist, who currently rides for UCI ProTeam Solution Tech NIPPO Rali. Professional since 2013, he won stage 10 of the 2015 Vuelta a España.

== Major results ==
2007
7th GP Dell'Arno
2008
1st Trofeo Buffoni
3rd Coppa Città di Offida
4th Overall Giro della Toscana
7th Overall Giro della Lunigiana
9th Trofeo San Rocco
2011
5th Gran Premio della Liberazione
5th Gran Premio Industrie del Marmo
2012
1st Trofeo Edil C
1st Trofeo Gianfranco Bianchin
2nd Gran Premio Industrie del Marmo
3rd Road race, National Under-23 Road Championships
3rd Ronde van Vlaanderen Beloften
3rd Gran Premio di Poggiana
4th Gran Premio della Liberazione
10th GP Capodarco
2013
5th Memorial Marco Pantani
5th Le Samyn
7th Ronde van Zeeland Seaports
10th Overall Tour de Korea

1st Stages 1 & 5 (TTT)

2014
2nd Gran Premio Industria e Commercio di Prato
4th Tour du Finistère
5th Le Samyn
7th Paris–Tours
10th Grand Prix de Denain
10th Grand Prix Pino Cerami
10th Trofeo Ses Salines
2015
1st Stage 10 Vuelta a España
4th Memorial Marco Pantani
5th Grand Prix of Aargau Canton
5th RideLondon–Surrey Classic
6th Tre Valli Varesine
7th Paris–Camembert
8th Kuurne–Brussels–Kuurne
8th Gran Piemonte
9th Overall Tour de Luxembourg
10th Overall Tour des Fjords
10th Trofeo Playa de Palma
2016
4th Grand Prix of Aargau Canton
4th Rund um Köln
8th Gran Premio Bruno Beghelli
9th Coppa Sabatini
9th Paris–Bourges
10th Tre Valli Varesine
2018
2nd Gran Premio di Lugano
4th Trofeo Matteotti
8th Overall Czech Cycling Tour
10th Grand Prix de Fourmies
10th Gran Premio Bruno Beghelli
2019
4th Coppa Sabatini
5th Overall Tour du Limousin
6th Grand Prix Cycliste de Montréal
7th Tre Valli Varesine
9th Gran Premio di Lugano
9th Memorial Marco Pantani
2020
5th Road race, National Road Championships
2021
6th Memorial Marco Pantani
6th Coppa Ugo Agostoni
7th Amstel Gold Race
8th Overall Tour of Britain
2022
8th Tour of Leuven
2023
3rd Road race, National Road Championships
2024
4th Coppa Sabatini
9th Overall Tour de Kyushu
10th Overall Région Pays de la Loire Tour

=== Grand Tour general classification results timeline ===
Grand Tour	2014	2015	2016	2017	2018	2019	2020	2021	2022	2023
Giro d'Italia	—	—	93	101	111	77	—	—	—	85
Tour de France	—	—	—	—	—	—	—	106	70	
Vuelta a España	104	105	82	—	—	—	—	—	—	

Legend
—	Did not compete
DNF	Did not finish
IP	In progress
