= Egor Silin =

Russian road racing cyclist

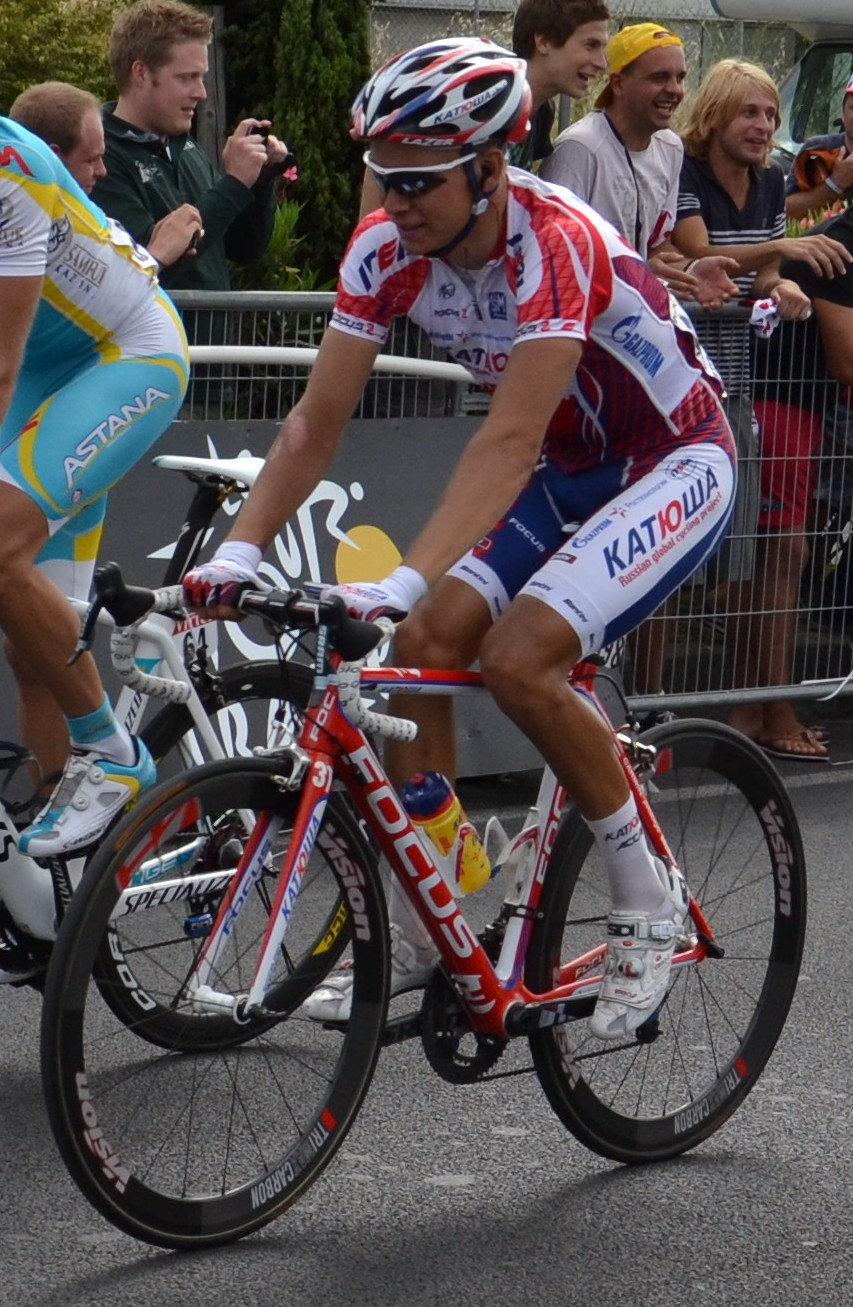
- Silin at the 2011 Tour de France

Personal information
- Full name: Egor Viktorovich Silin
- Born: 25 June 1988 (age 38): Ishim, Russian SFSR, Soviet Union; (now Russia)
- Height: 1.77 m (5 ft 10 in)
- Weight: 61 kg (134 lb)

Cycling career
- Sport: Cycling
- Discipline: Road
- Role: Rider
- Rider type: Climber

Professional teams
- 2010–2011: Team Katusha
- 2012–2013: Astana
- 2014–2016: Team Katusha
- 2017–2018: Rádio Popular–Boavista

Egor Viktorovich Silin (born 25 June 1988) is a Russian road racing cyclist, who last rode for UCI Continental team Rádio Popular–Boavista.

Silin left Astana at the end of the 2013 season, and rejoined Team Katusha for the 2014 season; Silin had been with the squad prior to moving to Astana. He was named in the start list for the 2016 Giro d'Italia.

== Major results ==
2007
2nd Gara Ciclistica Millionaria
2008
1st GP Citta di Felino
2nd Gara Ciclistica Millionaria
6th Piccolo Giro di Lombardia
7th Lombardia Tour
2009
1st Coppa della Pace
2nd GP Palio del Recioto
3rd Overall Giro della Valle d'Aosta

1st Stage 4

3rd Trofeo Alcide Degasperi
7th Giro del Belvedere
8th Overall Baby Giro

1st Stage 7

2011
1st Stage 4 Herald Sun Tour
6th Tre Valli Varesine
2014
8th Overall Tour Méditerranéen
10th Overall Tour Down Under
2015
6th Overall Tour of Austria

1st Prologue

2016
7th Gran Premio Miguel Indurain

=== Grand Tour general classification results timeline ===
Grand Tour	2011	2012	2013	2014	2015	2016
Giro d'Italia	—	—	—	—	—	38
Tour de France	73	—	—	DNF	—	—
Vuelta a España	—	122	—	—	—	15

Legend
—	Did not compete
DNF	Did not finish
