= Urdazubi/Urdax =

Coordinates: 43°16′02″N 1°30′16″W

Urdazubi
- Village
- Urdazubi / Urdax
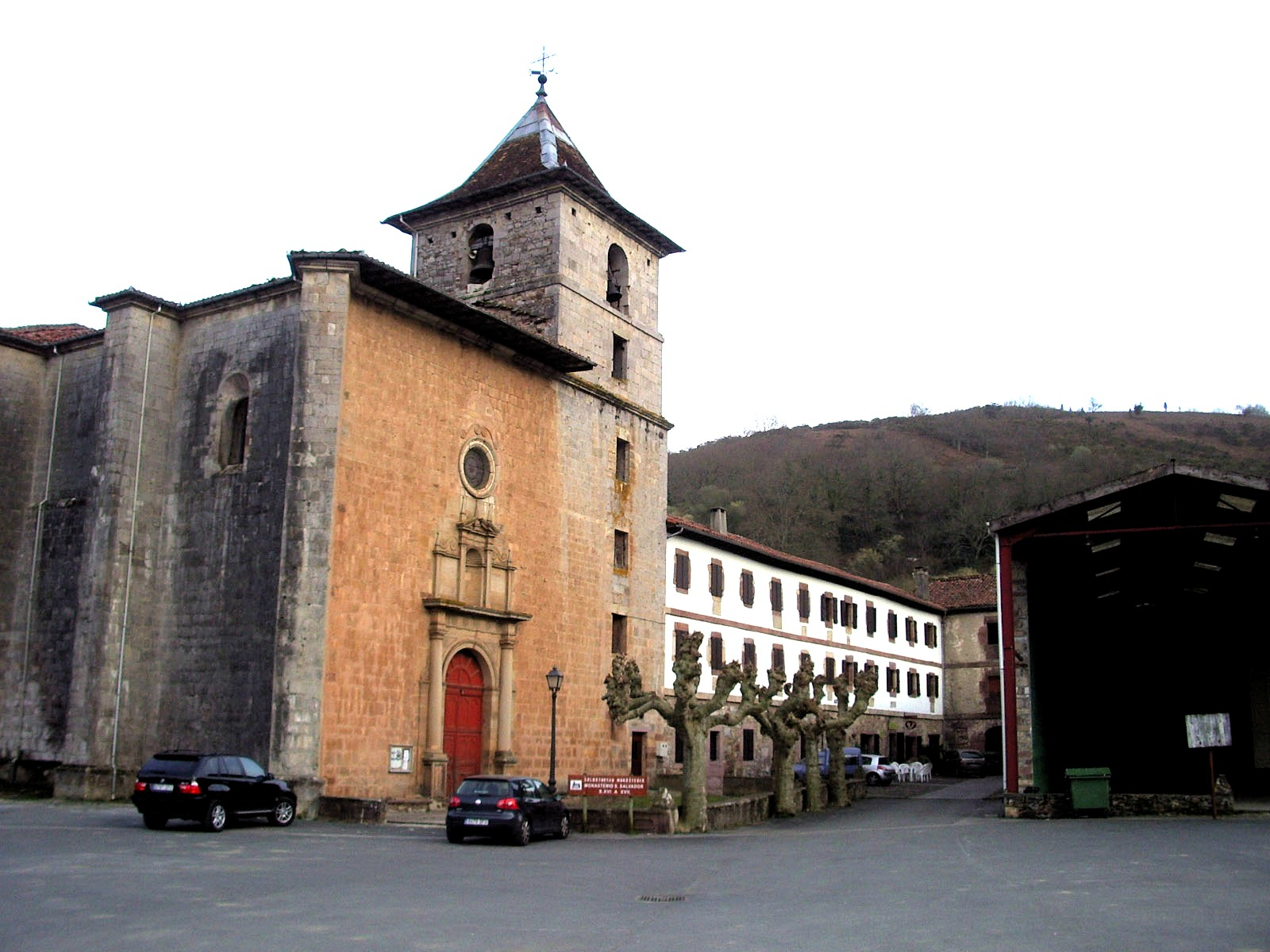

- Coat of arms

- Location within Spain
- Country: Spain
- Autonomous community: Navarre
- Province: Pamplona

Government
  - Mayor: Santiago Villares Oteguy. (2015) (Azkar)

Area
  - Total: 7.75 km^{2} (2.99 sq mi)
- Elevation: 90 m (300 ft)
- Highest elevation: 90 m (300 ft)
- Lowest elevation: 0 m (0 ft)

Population (2014)
  - Total: 392
  - Density: 50.6/km^{2} (131/sq mi)
- Demonym: Urdaizubitarra
- Time zone: UTC+1 (CET)
  - Summer (DST): UTC+2 (CEST)
- Postal code: 31711
- Dialing code: 948
- Official language(s): Basque language, Spanish
- Website: www.urdax.es

Urdazubi/Urdax is a village and municipality located in the autonomous community of Navarre, in the north of Spain.

== Caves ==
Well known because of its caves, Urdazubi is an interesting place for speleology at a basic level. Urdazubi caves were created by the underground river Urtxuma 14,000 years ago, and nowadays only a single cave can be visited by the public. The only cave that is opened to those interested in it, is the Ikaburu cave where visitors can enjoy a guided visit through its corridors and stances. The Ikaburu cave tour includes more than seeing the wonderful stalactites and stalagmites, but also stories of witches, shepherds, monks, Spanish Civil War, or even contrabandists.

== Monastery ==
The Monastery of Urdazubi is said to have been established during the 11th century by an Augustinian Congregation who built a pilgrim hospital there for those who were doing the Way of St James. Even if the monastery is there, the original building does not longer exist due to a fire that happened in 1526 and another one in 1793. The external appearance and architecture in renaissance style, which was not the original style, and the only things that are completely original and did not disappear during the fires are the church and the cloister.
