= 2016 Vuelta a España =

71st edition of the Vuelta a España

2016 UCI World Tour, race 21 of 28

Race details
- Dates: 20 August – 11 September 2016
- Stages: 21
- Distance: 3,315.4 km (2,060 mi)

Results
Jersey awarded to the overall winner	Winner	Nairo Quintana (COL)	(Movistar Team)
	Second	Chris Froome (GBR)	(Team Sky)
	Third	Esteban Chaves (COL)	(Orica–BikeExchange)
Jersey awarded to the points classification winner	Points	Fabio Felline (ITA)	(Trek–Segafredo)
Jersey awarded to the mountains classification winner	Mountains	Omar Fraile (ESP)	(Team Dimension Data)
Jersey awarded to the combination classification winner	Combination	Nairo Quintana (COL)	(Movistar Team)
	Combativity	Alberto Contador (ESP)	(Tinkoff)
	Team	(United States) BMC Racing Team	

The 2016 Vuelta a España was a three-week Grand Tour cycling stage race that took place in Spain between 20 August and 11 September 2016. The race was the 71st edition of the Vuelta a España and the final Grand Tour of the 2016 cycling season.

The race included 21 stages, beginning with a team time trial that started in Ourense. The subsequent stages included 10 summit finishes. The race ended in Madrid.

The overall winner was Nairo Quintana of team Movistar, with Chris Froome (Team Sky) second and Esteban Chaves (Orica–BikeExchange) third.

== Teams ==
The eighteen UCI WorldTeams were automatically invited and obliged to attend the race. The organiser of the Vuelta, Unipublic, was also able to invite four UCI Professional Continental teams – the second tier of professional cycling teams – as wildcards.

The teams entering the race were:

World Tour teams

- AG2R La Mondiale
- Astana
- BMC Racing Team
- Team Dimension Data
- Etixx–Quick-Step
- FDJ
- Team Giant–Alpecin
- IAM Cycling
- Team Katusha
- Lampre–Merida
- LottoNL–Jumbo
- Lotto–Soudal
- Movistar Team
- Team Sky
- Tinkoff
- Trek–Segafredo
- Cannondale–Drapac
- Orica–BikeExchange

Professional Continental teams

- Bora–Argon 18
- Caja Rural–Seguros RGA
- Cofidis
- Direct Énergie

== Route ==
The route of the 2016 Vuelta was announced on 9 January 2016. In contrast to the two previous editions of the Vuelta, which had begun in Andalusia, this edition spent its first week in Galicia in the north-west of Spain. The first stage was a team time trial to Castrelo de Miño. The first significant climb of the race was at the end of the third stage, which was the first of ten summit finishes in the race. The route travelled through Asturias before coming to the Basque Country; the fourteenth stage, described by Cyclingnews.com as the hardest of the race, took place mainly just across the border in France. The route continued down the eastern coast of Spain over the next few days, with several mountainous stages, with the race's only individual time trial coming on stage 19. One more mountainous stage followed, finishing on the Alto de Aitana, before the riders travelled to Madrid for the closing stage on a circuit in the city centre.

Stage characteristics and winners
Stage	Date	Course	Distance	Type	Winner
1	20 August	Laias to Parque Náutico Castrelo de Miño	27.8 km (17 mi)	Team time trial	(United Kingdom) Team Sky
2	21 August	Ourense to Baiona	160.8 km (100 mi)	Flat stage	Gianni Meersman (BEL)
3	22 August	Marín to Mirador de Ézaro (Dumbría)	176.4 km (110 mi)	Medium-mountain stage	Alexandre Geniez (FRA)
4	23 August	Betanzos to San Andrés de Teixido	163.5 km (102 mi)	Medium-mountain stage	Lilian Calmejane (FRA)
5	24 August	Viveiro to Lugo	171.3 km (106 mi)	Flat stage	Gianni Meersman (BEL)
6	25 August	Monforte de Lemos to Ribeira Sacra, Luintra	163.2 km (101 mi)	Hilly stage	Simon Yates (GBR)
7	26 August	Maceda to Puebla de Sanabria	158.5 km (98 mi)	Hilly stage	Jonas van Genechten (BEL)
8	27 August	Villalpando to La Camperona, Valle de Sabero	181.5 km (113 mi)	Medium-mountain stage	Sergey Lagutin (RUS)
9	28 August	Cistierna to Alto del Naranco, Oviedo	164.5 km (102 mi)	Medium-mountain stage	David de la Cruz (ESP)
10	29 August	Lugones to Lagos de Covadonga	188.7 km (117 mi)	Mountain stage	Nairo Quintana (COL)
	30 August	Oviedo	Rest day		
11	31 August	Jurassic Museum of Asturias, Colunga to Peña Cabarga	168.6 km (105 mi)	Medium-mountain stage	Chris Froome (GBR)
12	1 September	Los Corrales de Buelna to Bilbao	193.2 km (120 mi)	Hilly stage	Jens Keukeleire (BEL)
13	2 September	Bilbao to Urdax-Dantxarinea	213.4 km (133 mi)	Hilly stage	Valerio Conti (ITA)
14	3 September	Urdax-Dantxarinea to Col d'Aubisque (Gourette)	196 km (122 mi)	Mountain stage	Robert Gesink (NED)
15	4 September	Sabiñánigo to Aramon Formigal, Sallent de Gállego	118.5 km (74 mi)	Medium-mountain stage	Gianluca Brambilla (ITA)
16	5 September	Alcañiz to Peñíscola	156.4 km (97 mi)	Flat stage	Jempy Drucker (LUX)
	6 September	Castellón de la Plana	Rest day		
17	7 September	Castellón de la Plana to Camins del Penyagolosa, Llucena	177.5 km (110 mi)	Medium-mountain stage	Mathias Frank (SUI)
18	8 September	Requena to Gandia	200.6 km (125 mi)	Flat stage	Magnus Cort Nielsen (DEN)
19	9 September	Xàbia to Calp	37 km (23 mi)	Individual time trial	Chris Froome (GBR)
20	10 September	Benidorm to Alto de Aitana	193.2 km (120 mi)	Mountain stage	Pierre Latour (FRA)
21	11 September	Las Rozas to Madrid	104.8 km (65 mi)	Flat stage	Magnus Cort Nielsen (DEN)
Total			3,315.4 km (2,060 mi)		

== Classification leadership ==
The race included four principal classifications. The first of these was the general classification, which was calculated by adding up each rider's times on each stage and applying the relevant time bonuses. These were 10 seconds for the stage winner, 6 seconds for the rider in second, and 4 seconds for the rider in third, and 3, 2 and 1 seconds for the first three riders at each intermediate sprint; no bonuses were awarded on the time trial stages. The rider with the lowest cumulative time was the winner of the general classification and was considered the overall winner of the Vuelta. The rider leading the classification wore a red jersey.

Sprint points
Category	1st	2nd	3rd	4th	5th	6th	7th	8th	9th	10th	11th	12th	13th	14th	15th
Finish sprint	25	20	16	14	12	10	9	8	7	6	5	4	3	2	1
Intermediate sprint	4	2	1												

The second classification was the points classification. Riders were awarded points for finishing in the top fifteen places on each stage and in the top three at each intermediate sprint. The first rider at each stage finish was awarded 25 points, the second 20 points, the third 16 points, the fourth 14 points, the fifth 12 points, the sixth 10 points, down to 1 point for the rider in fifteenth. At the intermediate sprints, the first three riders won 4, 2 and 1 points respectively. The rider with the most points won the classification and wore a green jersey.

Mountain points
Category	1st	2nd	3rd	4th	5th	6th
Cima Alberto Fernández	20	15	10	6	4	2
Special category	15	10	6	4	2	
First category	10	6	4	2	1	
Second category	5	3	1			
Third category	3	2	1			

The third classification was the mountains classification. Most stages of the race included one or more categorised climbs. Stages were categorised as third-, second-, first- and special-category, with the more difficult climbs rated higher. The most difficult climb of the race was given its own category as the Cima Alberto Fernández. Points were awarded for the first riders across the summit of each climb; the rider with the most accumulated points won the classification and wore a white jersey with blue polka dots.

The fourth individual classification was the combination classification. This was calculated by adding up each rider's position on the other three individual classifications. The rider with the lowest cumulative score was the winner of the classification and wore a white jersey.

The final classification was a team classification. This was calculated by adding together the times of each team's best three riders on each stage. The team with the lowest cumulative time was the winner of the classification. There was also a combativeness prize awarded on each stage; three riders were chosen on each stage by a race jury to recognise the rider "who displayed the most courageous effort". There was then a public vote to decide which rider would be awarded the prize; the rider wore a red dossard (race number) the following day. An identical procedure took place on the final stage to decide the most combative rider of the whole Vuelta.

Classification leadership by stage
Stage	Winner	General classification	Points classification	Mountains classification	Combination classification	Team classification	Combativity award
1	Team Sky	Peter Kennaugh	not awarded	not awarded	not awarded	Team Sky	not awarded
2	Gianni Meersman	Michał Kwiatkowski	Gianni Meersman	Laurent Pichon	Laurent Pichon	Team Sky	not awarded
3	Alexandre Geniez	Rubén Fernández	Alexandre Geniez	Alexandre Geniez	Rubén Fernández	Movistar Team	Simon Pellaud
4	Lilian Calmejane	Darwin Atapuma	Alexandre Geniez	Alexandre Geniez	Darwin Atapuma	Movistar Team	Thomas De Gendt
5	Gianni Meersman	Darwin Atapuma	Gianni Meersman	Alexandre Geniez	Darwin Atapuma	Movistar Team	Tiago Machado
6	Simon Yates	Darwin Atapuma	Gianni Meersman	Alexandre Geniez	Darwin Atapuma	Movistar Team	Omar Fraile
7	Jonas van Genechten	Darwin Atapuma	Gianni Meersman	Alexandre Geniez	Darwin Atapuma	Movistar Team	Luis Ángel Maté
8	Sergey Lagutin	Nairo Quintana	Gianni Meersman	Sergey Lagutin	Alejandro Valverde	Etixx–Quick-Step	Jhonatan Restrepo
9	David de la Cruz	David de la Cruz	Gianni Meersman	Thomas De Gendt	David de la Cruz	Etixx–Quick-Step	Luis León Sánchez
10	Nairo Quintana	Nairo Quintana	Alejandro Valverde	Omar Fraile	Nairo Quintana	Movistar Team	Luis Ángel Maté
11	Chris Froome	Nairo Quintana	Alejandro Valverde	Nairo Quintana	Nairo Quintana	Movistar Team	Tiago Machado
12	Jens Keukeleire	Nairo Quintana	Alejandro Valverde	Nairo Quintana	Nairo Quintana	Movistar Team	David López
13	Valerio Conti	Nairo Quintana	Alejandro Valverde	Sergey Lagutin	Nairo Quintana	BMC Racing Team	Gatis Smukulis
14	Robert Gesink	Nairo Quintana	Alejandro Valverde	Kenny Elissonde	Nairo Quintana	BMC Racing Team	Simon Gerrans
15	Gianluca Brambilla	Nairo Quintana	Alejandro Valverde	Kenny Elissonde	Nairo Quintana	BMC Racing Team	Alberto Contador
16	Jempy Drucker	Nairo Quintana	Alejandro Valverde	Kenny Elissonde	Nairo Quintana	BMC Racing Team	Luis Ángel Maté
17	Mathias Frank	Nairo Quintana	Alejandro Valverde	Kenny Elissonde	Nairo Quintana	BMC Racing Team	Jaime Rosón
18	Magnus Cort	Nairo Quintana	Alejandro Valverde	Kenny Elissonde	Nairo Quintana	BMC Racing Team	Fumiyuki Beppu
19	Chris Froome	Nairo Quintana	Alejandro Valverde	Kenny Elissonde	Nairo Quintana	BMC Racing Team	Chris Froome
20	Pierre Latour	Nairo Quintana	Fabio Felline	Omar Fraile	Nairo Quintana	BMC Racing Team	Luis León Sánchez
21	Magnus Cort	Nairo Quintana	Fabio Felline	Omar Fraile	Nairo Quintana	BMC Racing Team	not awarded
Final		Nairo Quintana	Fabio Felline	Omar Fraile	Nairo Quintana	BMC Racing Team	Alberto Contador

- In stage three, Bryan Nauleau, who was second in the combination classification, wore the white jersey, because first-placed Laurent Pichon wore the polka-dot jersey as leader of the mountains classification.
- In stage four, Simon Pellaud, who was second in the mountains classification, wore the polka-dot jersey, because first-placed Alexandre Geniez wore the green jersey as leader of the points classification. Alejandro Valverde, who was second in the combination classification, wore the white jersey, because first-placed Rubén Fernández wore the red jersey as the leader of the overall classification.
- In stage five, Thomas De Gendt, who was second in the mountains classification, wore the polka-dot jersey, because first-placed Alexandre Geniez wore the green jersey as leader of the points classification. Lilian Calmejane, who was second in the combination classification, wore the white jersey, because first-placed Darwin Atapuma wore the red jersey as the leader of the overall classification.
- In stages 6–8, Alejandro Valverde, who was second in the combination classification, wore the white jersey, because first-placed Darwin Atapuma wore the red jersey as the leader of the overall classification.
- In stage ten, Alejandro Valverde, who was second in the combination classification, wore the white jersey, because first-placed David de la Cruz wore the red jersey as the leader of the overall classification.
- In stages 11–21, Chris Froome, who was second in the combination classification, wore the white jersey, because first-placed Nairo Quintana wore the red jersey as the leader of the overall classification.
- In stages twelve and thirteen, Omar Fraile, who was second in the mountains classification, wore the polka-dot jersey, because first-placed Nairo Quintana wore the red jersey as the leader of the overall classification.

== Final standings ==
Legend
General classification	Denotes the leader of the general classification	Points classification	Denotes the leader of the points classification
Mountains classification	Denotes the leader of the mountains classification	Combination classification	Denotes the leader of the combination rider classification

=== General classification ===
Final general classification (1–10)
Rank	Rider	Team	Time
1	Nairo Quintana (COL)	Movistar Team	83h 31' 28"
2	Chris Froome (GBR)	Team Sky	+ 1' 23"
3	Esteban Chaves (COL)	Orica–BikeExchange	+ 4' 08"
4	Alberto Contador (ESP)	Tinkoff	+ 4' 21"
5	Andrew Talansky (USA)	Cannondale–Drapac	+ 7' 43"
6	Simon Yates (GBR)	Orica–BikeExchange	+ 8' 33"
7	David de la Cruz (ESP)	Etixx–Quick-Step	+ 11' 18"
8	Daniel Moreno (ESP)	Movistar Team	+ 13' 04"
9	Davide Formolo (ITA)	Cannondale–Drapac	+ 13' 17"
10	George Bennett (NZL)	LottoNL–Jumbo	+ 14' 07"

=== Points classification ===
Final points classification (1–10)
Rank	Rider	Team	Points
1	Fabio Felline (ITA)	Trek–Segafredo	100
2	Nairo Quintana (COL)	Movistar Team	97
3	Alejandro Valverde (ESP)	Movistar Team	93
4	Chris Froome (GBR)	Team Sky	92
5	Luis León Sánchez (ESP)	Astana	75
6	Gianni Meersman (BEL)	Etixx–Quick-Step	73
7	Simon Yates (GBR)	Orica–BikeExchange	56
8	Alberto Contador (ESP)	Tinkoff	56
9	Esteban Chaves (COL)	Orica–BikeExchange	54
10	Daniele Bennati (ITA)	Tinkoff	54

=== Mountains classification ===
Final mountains classification (1–10)
Rank	Rider	Team	Points
1	Omar Fraile (ESP)	Team Dimension Data	58
2	Kenny Elissonde (FRA)	FDJ	57
3	Robert Gesink (NED)	LottoNL–Jumbo	37
4	Alexandre Geniez (FRA)	FDJ	28
5	Nairo Quintana (COL)	Movistar Team	27
6	Egor Silin (RUS)	Team Katusha	23
7	Sergey Lagutin (RUS)	Team Katusha	22
8	Thomas De Gendt (BEL)	Lotto–Soudal	19
9	Gianluca Brambilla (ITA)	Etixx–Quick-Step	18
10	Luis Ángel Maté (ESP)	Cofidis	18

=== Combination classification ===
Final combination classification (1–10)
Rank	Rider	Team	Points
1	Nairo Quintana (COL)	Movistar Team	8
2	Chris Froome (GBR)	Team Sky	17
3	Kenny Elissonde (FRA)	FDJ	34
4	David de la Cruz (ESP)	Etixx–Quick-Step	39
5	Alejandro Valverde (ESP)	Movistar Team	41
6	Fabio Felline (ITA)	Trek–Segafredo	43
7	Simon Yates (GBR)	Orica–BikeExchange	46
8	Gianluca Brambilla (ITA)	Etixx–Quick-Step	48
9	Robert Gesink (NED)	LottoNL–Jumbo	48
10	Egor Silin (RUS)	Team Katusha	49

=== Team classification ===
Final teams classification (1–10)
Rank	Team	Time
1	(United States) BMC Racing Team	249h 48' 23"
2	(Spain) Movistar Team	+ 4' 43"
3	(United States) Cannondale–Drapac	+ 22' 44"
4	(Russia) Team Katusha	+ 35' 19"
5	(France) AG2R La Mondiale	+ 35' 30"
6	(Kazakhstan) Astana	+ 56' 22"
7	(Belgium) Etixx–Quick-Step	+ 1h 04' 57"
8	(Switzerland) IAM Cycling	+ 1h 08' 38"
9	(Russia) Tinkoff	+ 1h 23' 50"
10	(Australia) Orica–BikeExchange	+ 1h 33' 00"

== Controversy ==
In stage 15, more than 90 riders were 10 km/h slower than the winner and finished far outside of the time cut. They were, nevertheless, allowed to stay in the race. Of the six remaining stages, five were won by riders from that grupetto (Drucker, Frank, 2x Cort Nielsen, Latour), Froome being the only exception after winning the time trial (stage 19).

== Sources ==
- Race regulations (PDF). Unipublic. Archived (PDF) from the original on 18 August 2015.
