= Darwin Atapuma =

Colombian cyclist

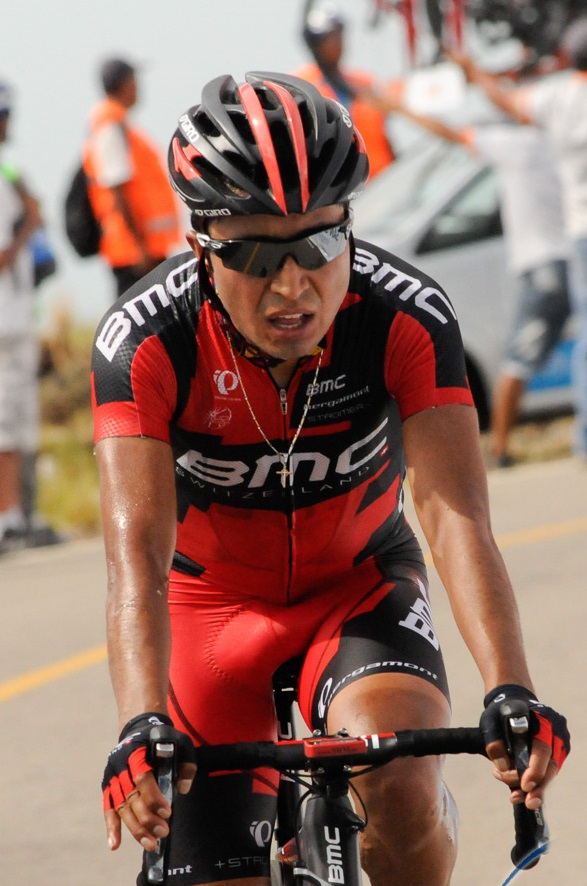
- Atapuma at the 2014 Tour de San Luis

Personal information
- Full name: Jhon Darwin Atapuma Hurtado
- Nickname: El Puma
- Born: 15 January 1988 (age 38) Túquerres, Nariño, Colombia
- Height: 1.67 m (5 ft 5 1/2 in)
- Weight: 59 kg (130 lb; 9 st 4 lb)

Cycling career
- Sport: Cycling
- Discipline: Road
- Role: Rider
- Rider type: Climbing specialist

Amateur team
- 2021: Colombia Tierra de Atletas–GW Bicicletas

Professional teams
- 2009–2011: Colombia es Pasión–Coldeportes
- 2012–2013: Colombia–Coldeportes
- 2014–2016: BMC Racing Team
- 2017–2018: UAE Abu Dhabi
- 2019: Cofidis
- 2020: Colombia Tierra de Atletas–GW Bicicletas
- 2022: Colombia Tierra de Atletas–GW Shimano
- 2023: Beykoz Belediyesi Spor Kulübü

Major wins
- Single-day races and Classics National Road Race Championships (2008)

Jhon Darwin Atapuma Hurtado (born 15 January 1988) is a Colombian retired cyclist, who last rode for UCI Continental team Istanbul Büyükșehir Belediye Spor Türkiye.

After two seasons with Colombia, Atapuma left the team at the end of the 2013 season and joined the BMC Racing Team for 2014. In 2015, he finished 16th in the Giro d'Italia and 56th in the Vuelta a España. In the 2016 Vuelta a España, he held the red jersey after a second-place finish in Stage 4. In September 2016 Atapuma announced that he would join UAE Abu Dhabi on a two-year deal from 2017.

== Major results ==
2007
6th Overall Vuelta al Ecuador

1st Stages 2 & 8

2008
1st Road race, National Road Championships
2009
3rd Overall Tour de Beauce

1st Stage 3

6th Overall Coupe des nations Ville Saguenay
2010
6th Overall Vuelta a Colombia
8th Overall Grand Prix du Portugal
9th Overall Tour de l'Avenir
2011
9th Overall Tour de l'Ain
2012
3rd Road race, National Road Championships
8th Overall Giro del Trentino

1st Stage 4

9th Overall Volta a Portugal
10th Overall Vuelta a Colombia
10th Overall Monviso-Venezia — Il Padania
2013
1st Stage 6 Tour de Pologne
6th Overall Tour of Slovenia
6th Overall Tour of Turkey
2014
9th Overall Tour de San Luis
2015
1st Stage 1 (TTT) Vuelta a España
7th Overall Volta a Catalunya
2016
1st Stage 5 Tour de Suisse
4th Overall Tour of Utah
9th Overall Giro d'Italia
Vuelta a España

Held & after Stages 4–7

2017
4th Road race, National Road Championships
Combativity award Stage 18 Tour de France
2019
10th Mont Ventoux Dénivelé Challenge
2021
1st Stage 8 Vuelta a Colombia

=== Grand Tour general classification results timeline ===
Grand Tour	2013	2014	2015	2016	2017	2018	2019
Giro d'Italia	18	—	16	9	—	61	—
Tour de France	—	DNF	—	—	41	69	—
Vuelta a España	—	—	56	32	20	—	61

Legend
—	Did not compete
DNF	Did not finish
