= Gianluca Brambilla =

Italian road racing cyclist

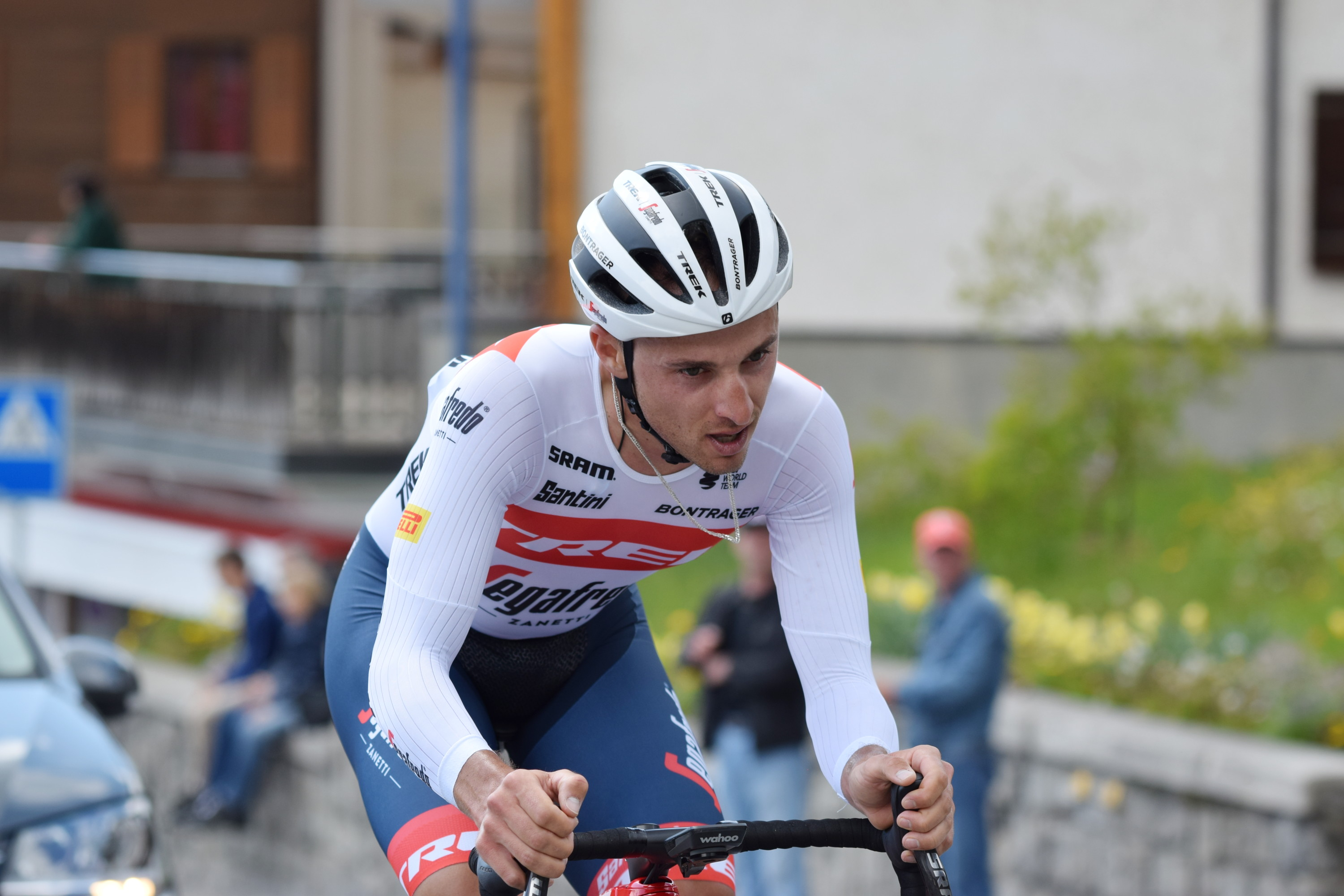
- Brambilla at the 2022 Tour de Romandie.

Personal information
- Full name: Gianluca Brambilla
- Nickname: Brambi
- Born: 22 August 1987 (age 39) Bellano, Italy
- Height: 1.70 m (5 ft 7 in)
- Weight: 57 kg (126 lb; 9.0 st)

Cycling career
- Sport: Cycling
- Current team: Pinarello–Q36.5 Pro Cycling Team
- Discipline: Road
- Role: Rider
- Rider type: Climber; Domestique

Amateur teams
- 2006: Ormesani Panni
- 2007–2009: Zalf Desirèe Fior

Professional teams
- 2010–2012: Colnago–CSF Inox
- 2013–2017: Omega Pharma–Quick-Step
- 2018–2022: Trek–Segafredo
- 2023–: Q36.5 Pro Cycling Team

Major wins
- Grand Tours Giro d'Italia 1 individual stage (2016) Vuelta a España 1 individual stage (2016)

Gianluca Brambilla (born 22 August 1987) is an Italian professional road bicycle racer, who currently rides for UCI ProTeam Pinarello–Q36.5 Pro Cycling Team. He started his professional career in 2010 with Colnago–CSF Inox.

== Career ==
Born in Bellano, Brambilla began his professional career in 2010 with the Colnago–CSF Inox team, moving to Omega Pharma–Quick-Step in 2013. He was also a member of the Ormesani Panni and Zalf Desirèe Fior teams as an amateur, winning numerous domestic races. At the 2011 Giro d'Italia, Brambilla finished fourth in the mountains classification as well as taking a fourth place stage finish during Stage 18 to San Pellegrino Terme. Brambilla took two further top-ten places at the 2012 edition of the race, placing tenth on the seventh stage, and seventh on the eighth stage.

In September 2014, Brambilla was ejected from the Vuelta a España during the 16th stage after trading blows with Russian cyclist Ivan Rovny.

In 2016, he won Stage 8 of the Giro d'Italia, which netted him the Pink Jersey. He did so from an early breakaway. In June 2017, he was named in the startlist for the Tour de France.

In February 2021, Brambilla won the Tour des Alpes-Maritimes et du Var stage race. He had done well on the first two stages, managing to keep pace with race leaders, and was well-placed going into the third and final stage in 17th place, but only 13 seconds behind then-race leader Michael Woods. He was a part of the day's main breakaway group of 16 riders. As the breakaway began to disintegrate on the slopes of the last categorized climb, the Col de la Madone, Brambilla attacked, with only Valentin Madouas able to follow. With around 11 kilometers left, he attacked again, and this time Madouas was unable to keep up. Brambilla pushed on over the last climb, the uncategorized Col de Nice, and managed to hold on for the stage win. Despite Woods' best efforts to maintain his lead, he and Brambilla's teammate Bauke Mollema finished in a group 18 seconds behind Brambilla, giving the Italian the overall win.

== Major results ==
2006
3rd Overall Giro del Veneto Juniors
2007
Giro del Veneto Juniors

1st Stages 1 (TTT) & 4

5th Overall Giro del Friuli-Venezia Giulia
9th Giro del Belvedere
2008
1st Gran Premio Palio del Recioto
3rd Trofeo Zsšdi
4th Trofeo Gianfranco Bianchin
5th Trofeo Banca Popolare di Vicenza
6th Overall Giro delle Regioni
9th GP Capodarco
10th Trofeo Città di San Vendemiano
2009
1st Overall Giro del Friuli-Venezia Giulia
1st Coppa Città di San Daniele
2nd Trofeo Gianfranco Bianchin
3rd Road race, National Under-23 Road Championships
3rd Trofeo Zsšdi
3rd Giro della Valli Aretine
3rd Ruota d'Oro
7th Gran Premio Palio del Recioto
10th Giro del Medio Brenta
2010 (1 pro win)
1st Gran Premio Nobili Rubinetterie
6th Gran Premio di Lugano
2011
4th Gran Premio Industria e Commercio Artigianato Carnaghese
4th Giro della Romagna
6th Gran Premio dell'Insubria-Lugano
2012
1st Stage 1b (TTT) Giro di Padania
2nd Giro dell'Appennino
4th Trofeo Laigueglia
4th GP Industria & Artigianato di Larciano
7th Gran Premio di Lugano
7th Memorial Marco Pantani
8th Trofeo Melinda
10th Giro dell'Emilia
2014
4th Trofeo Serra de Tramuntana
2015
6th Overall Abu Dhabi Tour
10th Giro di Lombardia
10th La Drôme Classic
2016 (3)
1st Trofeo Pollenca–Port de Andratx
Giro d'Italia

1st Stage 8
Held after Stages 8–9

1st Stage 15 Vuelta a España
2nd Road race, National Road Championships
3rd Strade Bianche
4th Trofeo Serra de Tramuntana
6th Clásica de San Sebastián
7th Overall Vuelta a Burgos
8th Tre Valli Varesine
10th Overall Tour of Oman
2017
8th Cadel Evans Great Ocean Road Race
8th Grand Prix de Wallonie
2018
4th Trofeo Serra de Tramuntana
5th Memorial Marco Pantani
8th Overall Tour of Croatia
10th Overall Adriatica Ionica Race
10th Tre Valli Varesine
2019
6th Trofeo Andratx–Lloseta
10th Giro dell'Emilia
Giro d'Italia

Held after Stage 12

2020
9th Overall Tirreno–Adriatico
10th Giro dell'Emilia
2021 (2)
1st Overall Tour des Alpes-Maritimes et du Var

1st Stage 3

6th GP Industria & Artigianato di Larciano
2022
8th Overall Settimana Internazionale di Coppi e Bartali
9th Overall Tour de l'Ain
2023
7th Overall Vuelta a Asturias
9th Giro della Toscana
9th Trofeo Matteotti
10th Overall Settimana Internazionale di Coppi e Bartali
10th Giro del Veneto
2024
5th Overall AlUla Tour
6th Milano–Torino
9th GP Industria & Artigianato di Larciano
10th Vuelta a Murcia
10th Memorial Marco Pantani
2025
7th Overall Tour de l'Ain

=== Grand Tour general classification results timeline ===
| Grand Tour | 2011 | 2012 | 2013 | 2014 | 2015 | 2016 | 2017 | 2018 | 2019 | 2020 | 2021 |
|---|---|---|---|---|---|---|---|---|---|---|---|
| Giro d'Italia | 95 | 13 | 105 | 29 | — | 22 | — | 18 | 49 | DNF | DNF |
| Tour de France | — | — | — | — | — | — | 53 | — | — | — | — |
| Vuelta a España | — | — | — | DSQ | 13 | 23 | — | 16 | 42 | — | 22 |

Legend
| — | Did not compete |
| DNF | Did not finish |
