= 2014 Wanty–Groupe Gobert season =

Belgian cycling team season

2014 Wanty–Groupe Gobert season
Manager	Jean-François Bourlaert
One-day victories	3
Stage race overall victories	–
Stage race stage victories	7
Previous season • Next season

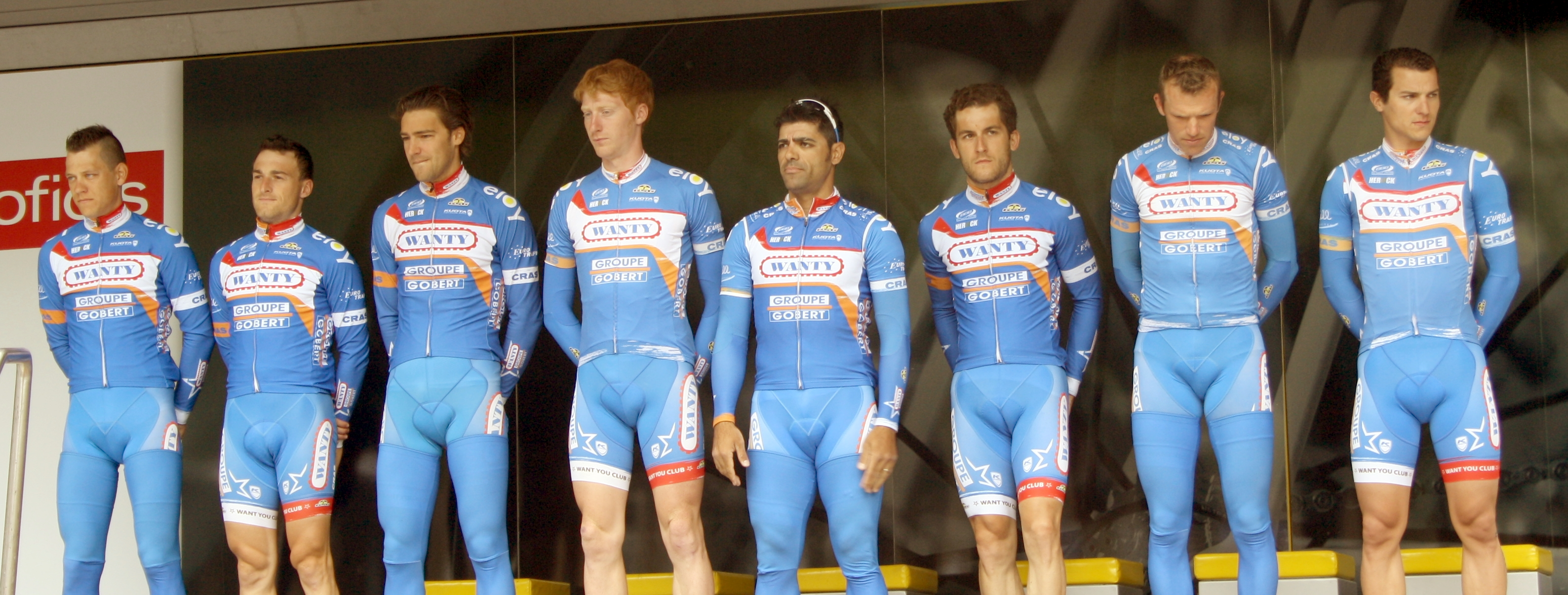
Wanty

The 2014 season for the Wanty–Groupe Gobert cycling team began in January at the La Tropicale Amissa Bongo. The team participated in UCI Continental Circuits and UCI World Tour events when given a wildcard invitation.

== 2014 roster ==
As of 25 February 2014.

Rider	Date of birth
Frederik Backaert (BEL)	13 March 1990 (age 36)
Jerôme Baugnies (BEL)	1 April 1987 (age 39)
Francis De Greef (BEL)	2 February 1985 (age 41)
Tim De Troyer (BEL)	11 August 1990 (age 35)
Laurens De Vreese (BEL)	29 September 1988 (age 37)
Thomas Degand (BEL)	13 May 1986 (age 40)
Jempy Drucker (LUX)	3 September 1986 (age 39)
Jan Ghyselinck (BEL)	24 February 1988 (age 38)
Jérôme Gilbert (BEL)	22 January 1984 (age 42)
Grégory Habeaux (BEL)	20 October 1982 (age 43)
Roy Jans (BEL)	15 September 1990 (age 35)
Michel Kreder (NED)	15 August 1987 (age 38)

Rider	Date of birth
Wesley Kreder (NED)	4 November 1990 (age 35)
Björn Leukemans (BEL)	1 July 1977 (age 48)
Marco Minnaard (NED)	11 April 1989 (age 37)
Danilo Napolitano (ITA)	31 January 1981 (age 45)
Fréderique Robert (BEL)	25 January 1989 (age 37)
Kevin Seeldraeyers (BEL)	12 September 1986 (age 39)
Mirko Selvaggi (ITA)	11 February 1985 (age 41)
Nico Sijmens (BEL)	1 April 1978 (age 48)
Kevin Van Melsen (BEL)	1 April 1987 (age 39)
James Vanlandschoot (BEL)	26 August 1978 (age 47)
Frederik Veuchelen (BEL)	4 September 1978 (age 47)

Riders who joined the team for the 2014 season

Rider	2013 team
Frederik Backaert	neo-pro (EFC-Omega Pharma-Quick Step)
Jérôme Baugnies	ex-pro (ToWin-Josan)
Francis De Greef	Lotto–Belisol
Laurens De Vreese	Topsport Vlaanderen–Baloise
Jan Ghyselinck	Cofidis
Michel Kreder	Garmin–Sharp
Wesley Kreder	Vacansoleil–DCM
Björn Leukemans	Vacansoleil–DCM
Marco Minnaard	neo-pro (Rabobank Development Team)
Fréderique Robert	Lotto–Belisol
Kevin Seeldraeyers	Astana
Mirko Selvaggi	Vacansoleil–DCM
Nico Sijmens	Cofidis
Frederik Veuchelen	Vacansoleil–DCM

Riders who left the team during or after the 2013 season

Rider	2014 team
Steven Caethoven	Decock-Woningbouw Vandekerkhove
Andy Cappelle	Retired
Davy Commeyne	Smartphoto
Will Routley	Optum–Kelly Benefit Strategies
Staf Scheirlinckx	Retired
Stefan van Dijk	Retired
Jurgen Van Goolen	Retired
Benjamin Verraes	Josan-To Win
Nicolas Vogondy	Retired

== Season victories ==
Date	Race	Competition	Rider	Country	Location
14 January	La Tropicale Amissa Bongo, Stage 2	UCI Africa Tour	Jérôme Baugnies (BEL)	Gabon	Oyem
15 January	La Tropicale Amissa Bongo, Stage 3	UCI Africa Tour	Roy Jans (BEL)	Gabon	Lambaréné
18 January	La Tropicale Amissa Bongo, Stage 6	UCI Africa Tour	Fréderique Robert (BEL)	Gabon	Port-Gentil
19 January	La Tropicale Amissa Bongo, Stage 7	UCI Africa Tour	Fréderique Robert (BEL)	Gabon	Libreville
19 January	La Tropicale Amissa Bongo, Points classification	UCI Africa Tour	Roy Jans (BEL)	Gabon	
19 January	La Tropicale Amissa Bongo, Mountains classification	UCI Africa Tour	Marco Minnaard (NED)	Gabon	
9 March	Driedaagse van West-Vlaanderen, Points classification	UCI Europe Tour	Danilo Napolitano (ITA)	Belgium	
16 March	Omloop van het Waasland	UCI Europe Tour	Danilo Napolitano (ITA)	Belgium	Stekene
3 April	Three Days of De Panne, Mountains classification	UCI Europe Tour	Tim De Troyer (BEL)	Belgium	
18 May	Tour de Picardie, Teams classification	UCI Europe Tour	(Note: The riders on the squad were Danilo Napolitano, Tim De Troyer, Jempy Drucker, Grégory Habeaux, Wesley Kreder, Björn Leukemans, Fréderique Robert, and Frederik Veuchelen)	France	
25 May	World Ports Classic, Teams classification	UCI Europe Tour	(Note: The riders on the squad were Danilo Napolitano, Frederik Backaert, Tim De Troyer, Laurens De Vreese, Roy Jans, Wesley Kreder, Fréderique Robert, and Frederik Veuchelen)	(Note: Race held in Belgium and the Netherlands.)	
28 May	Tour des Fjords, Stage 1	UCI Europe Tour	Jérôme Baugnies (BEL)	Norway	Ulvik
30 July	Tour de Wallonie, Mountains classification	UCI Europe Tour	Kevin Van Melsen (BEL)	Belgium	
3 August	Polynormande	UCI Europe Tour	Jan Ghyselinck (BEL)	France	Saint-Martin-de-Landelles
19 August	Tour du Limousin, Stage 1	UCI Europe Tour	Björn Leukemans (BEL)	France	Brive
22 August	Tour du Limousin, Combination classification	UCI Europe Tour	Francis De Greef (BEL)	France	
29 August	Tour du Poitou-Charentes, Mountains classification	UCI Europe Tour	Kevin Van Melsen (BEL)	France	
27 September	Tour du Gévaudan Languedoc-Roussillon, Stage 1	UCI Europe Tour	Thomas Degand (BEL)	France	Chanac
28 September	Gooikse Pijl	UCI Europe Tour	Roy Jans (BEL)	Belgium	Gooik
