= List of wins by Willems Verandas Continental Team and its successors =

This is a comprehensive list of victories of the Intermarché–Wanty cycling team. The races are categorized according to the UCI Continental Circuits rules. The team was a Continental team in 2008 a Professional Continental team from 2011 to 2020. In 2021 the team stepped up to the world tour.

== 2008 Willems Verandas ==
No recorded wins

== 2009 Verandas Willems ==
Circuit de Wallonie, Romain Zingle

== 2010 Verandas Willems ==
Arno Wallaard Memorial, Stefan van Dijk
Omloop der Kempen, Stefan van Dijk
Stage 3 Rhône-Alpes Isère Tour, Andy Cappelle
Flèche Ardennaise, Thomas Degand
Stage 2 Tour de Wallonie, Stefan van Dijk
Polynormande, Andy Cappelle
Grote Prijs Stad Zottegem, Stefan van Dijk
Omloop van het Houtland, Stefan van Dijk

== 2011 Veranda's Willems–Accent ==
Beverbeek Classic, Evert Verbist
Stage 2 Delta Tour Zeeland, Steven Caethoven
Stage 1 Route du Sud, Stefan van Dijk
Stage 3 Route du Sud, Jurgen Van Goolen
Dwars door het Hageland, Grégory Habeaux

== 2012 Accent.jobs–Willems Veranda's ==
Grote Prijs Jef Scherens, Steven Caethoven

== 2013 Accent Jobs–Wanty ==
Stage 1 Driedaagse van West-Vlaanderen, Danilo Napolitano

== 2014 Wanty–Groupe Gobert ==
Stage 2 La Tropicale Amissa Bongo, Jérôme Baugnies
Stage 3 La Tropicale Amissa Bongo, Roy Jans
Stages 6 & 7 La Tropicale Amissa Bongo, Fréderique Robert
Omloop van het Waasland, Danilo Napolitano
Stage 1 Tour des Fjords, Jérôme Baugnies
La Poly Normande, Jan Ghyselinck
Stage 1 Tour du Limousin, Björn Leukemans
Stage 1 Tour du Gévaudan Languedoc-Roussillon, Thomas Degand
Gooikse Pijl, Roy Jans

== 2015 Wanty–Groupe Gobert ==
Stage 2 Étoile de Bessèges, Roy Jans
Tour du Finistère, Tim De Troyer
Stage 3 Boucles de la Mayenne, Danilo Napolitano
Ronde van Limburg, Björn Leukemans
Grote Prijs Jef Scherens, Björn Leukemans
Druivenkoers Overijse, Jérôme Baugnies
Schaal Sels-Merksem, Robin Stenuit

== 2016 Wanty–Groupe Gobert ==
Amstel Gold Race, Enrico Gasparotto
Stage 4 4 Jours de Dunkerque, Kenny Dehaes
Stage 3 Rhône-Alpes Isère Tour, Jérôme Baugnies
Stage 3 Tour de Picardie, Kenny Dehaes
Ronde van Limburg, Kenny Dehaes
Internationale Wielertrofee Jong Maar Moedig I.W.T., Jérôme Baugnies
Grote Prijs Jef Scherens, Dimitri Claeys
Stage 7 Tour of Austria, Frederik Backaert

== 2017 Wanty–Groupe Gobert ==
Le Samyn, Guillaume Van Keirsbulck
Overall Rhône-Alpes Isère Tour, Marco Minnaard
Overall Tour du Jura, Thomas Degand

== 2018 Wanty–Groupe Gobert ==
Overall Circuit Cycliste Sarthe – Pays de la Loire, Guillaume Martin

Stage 3, Guillaume Martin

Grand Prix de Plumelec-Morbihan, Andrea Pasqualon
Overall Tour de Luxembourg, Andrea Pasqualon

Stages 2 & 3 Tour de Luxembourg, Andrea Pasqualon

Internationale Wielertrofee Jong Maar Moedig I.W.T., Jérôme Baugnies
Stage 3 Tour de Wallonie, Odd Christian Eiking
GP Stad Zottegem, Jérôme Baugnies
Schaal Sels, Timothy Dupont
Druivenkoers Overijse, Xandro Meurisse
Antwerp Port Epic, Guillaume Van Keirsbulck
Overall Tour of Taihu Lake, Boris Vallée

== 2019 Wanty–Gobert ==
Stage 4 Giro di Sicilia, Guillaume Martin
Stage 2 Tour of Austria, Tom Devriendt
Overall Tour de Wallonie, Loïc Vliegen

Stage 1, Timothy Dupont
Stage 2, Loïc Vliegen

Stage 3 Arctic Race of Norway, Odd Christian Eiking
Stage 5 Tour Poitou-Charentes en Nouvelle Aquitaine, Andrea Pasqualon
Antwerp Port Epic, Aimé De Gendt

== 2020 Circus–Wanty Gobert ==
Overall Vuelta a Murcia, Xandro Meurisse

Stage 1, Xandro Meurisse

Tour du Doubs, Loïc Vliegen
Gooikse Pijl, Danny van Poppel

== 2021 Intermarché–Wanty–Gobert Matériaux ==
Stage 3 Giro d'Italia, Taco van der Hoorn
Estonia National Time Trial Championships, Rein Taaramäe
Stage 2 Tour de l'Ain, Georg Zimmermann
Stage 3 Vuelta a España, Rein Taaramäe
Egmont Cycling Race, Danny van Poppel
Stage 3 Benelux Tour, Taco van der Hoorn
Classic Grand Besançon Doubs, Biniam Girmay
Omloop van het Houtland, Taco van der Hoorn
Binche–Chimay–Binche, Danny van Poppel

== 2022 Intermarché–Wanty–Gobert Matériaux ==
Trofeo Alcúdia – Port d'Alcúdia, Biniam Girmay
Clásica de Almería, Alexander Kristoff
Overall Tour of Oman, Jan Hirt

Stage 5, Jan Hirt

Gent–Wevelgem, Biniam Girmay
Scheldeprijs, Alexander Kristoff
Stage 6 Four Days of Dunkirk, Gerben Thijssen
Stage 10 Giro d'Italia, Biniam Girmay
Stage 16 Giro d'Italia, Jan Hirt
Circuit de Wallonie, Andrea Pasqualon
Stage 6 Tour of Norway, Alexander Kristoff
Giro dell'Appennino, Louis Meintjes
Brussels Cycling Classic, Taco van der Hoorn
Stage 4 Tour of Belgium, Quinten Hermans
Estonia National Time Trial Championships, Rein Taaramäe
Eritrea National Time Trial Championships, Biniam Girmay
Stage 5 Tour de Wallonie, Jan Bakelants
Stage 2 Tour de Pologne, Gerben Thijssen
Overall Sazka Tour, Lorenzo Rota

Stage 2, Lorenzo Rota

Circuit Franco–Belge, Alexander Kristoff
Stage 2 Deutschland Tour, Alexander Kristoff
Stage 9 Vuelta a España, Louis Meintjes
Gooikse Pijl, Gerben Thijssen

== 2023 Intermarché–Circus–Wanty ==
Trofeo Calvià, Rui Costa
Trofeo Andratx–Mirador D'es Colomer, Kobe Goossens
Trofeo Serra de Tramuntana, Kobe Goossens
Overall Volta a la Comunitat Valenciana, Rui Costa

Stage 1, Biniam Girmay
Stage 5, Rui Costa

Grote Prijs Jean-Pierre Monseré, Gerben Thijssen
Bredene Koksijde Classic, Gerben Thijssen
Stage 2 Giro di Sicilia, Niccolò Bonifazio
Stage 1 Tour of Norway, Mike Teunissen
Ronde van Limburg, Gerben Thijssen
Stage 6 Critérium du Dauphiné, Georg Zimmermann
Stage 2 Tour de Suisse, Biniam Girmay
Estonia National Time Trial Championships, Rein Taaramäe
Stage 4 Tour du Limousin, Hugo Page
Stage 3 Renewi Tour, Mike Teunissen
Stage 3 Deutschland Tour, Madis Mihkels
Stage 15 Vuelta a España, Rui Costa
Omloop van het Houtland, Gerben Thijssen
Japan Cup, Rui Costa

== 2024 Intermarché–Wanty ==
Surf Coast Classic, Biniam Girmay
Trofeo Palma, Gerben Thijssen
Stage 1 Volta ao Algarve, Gerben Thijssen
Le Samyn, Laurenz Rex
Stage 4 Tour of the Basque Country, Louis Meintjes
Circuit Franco-Belge, Biniam Girmay
Overall ZLM Tour, Rune Herregodts

Stage 1 (ITT), Rune Herregodts

Estonia National Time Trial Championships, Rein Taaramäe
Points classification Tour de France, Biniam Girmay

Stages 3, 8 & 12, Biniam Girmay

Elfstedenrace, Taco van der Hoorn

== Supplementary statistics ==
'Grand Tours by highest finishing position
Race	2011	2012	2013	2014	2015	2016	2017	2018	2019	2020	2021	2022	2023
Giro d'Italia	–	–	–	–	–	–	–	–	–	–	26	6	27
Tour de France	–	–	–	–	–	–	23	21	12	–	14	8	47
Vuelta a España	–	–	–	–	–	–	–	–	–	–	11	11	41
'Major week-long stage races by highest finishing position
Race	2011	2012	2013	2014	2015	2016	2017	2018	2019	2020	2021	2022	2023
Tour Down Under	–	–	–	–	–	–	–	–	–	–	NH		7
Paris–Nice	–	–	–	–	–	–	–	–	–	11	23	23	13
Tirreno–Adriatico	–	–	–	–	–	–	–	–	–	–	22	13	25
Volta a Catalunya	–	–	–	70	50	35	36	–	8	NH	28	19	31
Tour of the Basque Country	–	–	–	–	–	–	–	–	–	NH	30	DNF	15
Tour de Romandie	–	–	–	–	–	21	34	27	18	NH	18	32	19
Critérium du Dauphiné	–	–	–	–	–	29	18	12	14	54	17	6	7
Tour de Suisse	–	–	–	17	22	–	–	–	–	NH	DNF (Note: The team did not start Stage 4 due to a positive Covid test.)	9	DNF (Note: Following the death of Gino Mäder during Stage 5 and subsecquent cancellation of stage 6, the team pulled out of the race to honor Mader.)
Tour de Pologne	–	–	–	–	–	–	–	–	–	–	12	20	59
Benelux Tour	38	49	43	28	17	34	17	20	55	15	21	NH (Note: The race was cancelled due to an overcrowded calendar.)	5
'Monument races by highest finishing position
Race	2011	2012	2013	2014	2015	2016	2017	2018	2019	2020	2021	2022	2023
Milan–San Remo	–	–	–	–	–	–	–	–	–	21	40	12	28
Tour of Flanders	8	37	78	9	18	9	14	30	37	15	16	10	31
Paris–Roubaix	–	–	–	15	19	22	14	–	26	NH	19	4	9
Liège–Bastogne–Liège	DNF	85	119	49	16	12	65	33	19	24	36	2	20
Il Lombardia	–	–	–	–	–	–	–	–	–	30	28	33	13
'Classics by highest finishing position
Classic	2011	2012	2013	2014	2015	2016	2017	2018	2019	2020	2021	2022	2023
Omloop Het Nieuwsblad	45	10	13	6	15	12	11	28	47	19	28	8	11
Kuurne–Brussels–Kuurne	11	8	NH	20	20	30	28	10	16	22	39	10	4
Strade Bianche	–	–	–	–	–	–	–	–	–	18	34	9	4
E3 Harelbeke	22	47	DNF	16	12	17	52	15	42	NH	24	5	30
Gent–Wevelgem	56	40	26	27	21	55	20	22	42	20	23	1	45
Amstel Gold Race	23	95	98	11	8	1	31	38	27	NH	20	27	32
La Flèche Wallonne	34	111	126	29	15	5	40	66	18	34	14	15	25
Clásica de San Sebastián	–	–	–	–	–	–	–	–	–	NH	4	10	8
Paris–Tours	68	23	37	4	5	12	8	11	6	9	5	11	14

Legend
—	Did not compete
DNF	Did not finish
DNS	Did not start
NH	Not held
