= List of Mitsubishi–Jartazi rosters =

The following is a list of rosters of the former UCI team Mitsubishi–Jartazi, categorised by season.

== 2004 ==
Roster in 2004, age as of 1 January 2004:

Rider	Date of birth
Jurgen Beeckman (BEL)	13 March 1983 (aged 20)
Bart Cosyn (BEL)	9 May 1985 (aged 18)
Davy Daniels (BEL)	12 July 1976 (aged 27)
Klaas De Gruyter (BEL)	9 March 1980 (aged 23)
Dimitri De Herdt (BEL)	13 February 1981 (aged 22)
Benedikt De Vreese (BEL)	7 April 1985 (aged 18)
Ken Devaere (BEL)	1 July 1983 (aged 20)
Andy Dierckx (BEL)	31 January 1983 (aged 20)
Leonardo Duque (COL)	10 April 1980 (aged 23)
Morten Hegreberg (NOR)	11 June 1977 (aged 26)
Roy Hegreberg (NOR)	25 March 1981 (aged 22)
Olivier Huysveld (BEL)	25 August 1983 (aged 20)

Rider	Date of birth
Robby Meul (BEL)	4 September 1981 (aged 22)
Pieter Muys (BEL)	2 January 1985 (aged 18)
Maarten Neyens (BEL)	1 March 1985 (aged 18)
Frederik Penne (BEL)	5 June 1978 (aged 25)
Stijn Penne (BEL)	30 August 1984 (aged 19)
Peter Ronsse (BEL)	9 February 1980 (aged 23)
Dries Van der Ginst (BEL)	16 May 1985 (aged 18)
Kenny Van Der Schueren (BEL)	20 July 1982 (aged 21)
Gregory Van Sinaey (BEL)	1 June 1982 (aged 21)
Jelle Vanendert (BEL)	19 February 1985 (aged 18)
Tom Vastmans (BEL)	13 August 1984 (aged 19)
Glen Zelderloo (BEL)	2 January 1980 (aged 23)

== 2005 ==
Roster in 2005, age as of 1 January 2005:

Rider	Date of birth
Igor Abakoumov (BEL)	30 May 1981 (aged 23)
Heath Blackgrove (NZL)	5 December 1980 (aged 24)
Michael Blanchy (BEL)	24 September 1981 (aged 23)
David Derepas (FRA)	9 March 1978 (aged 26)
Leonardo Duque (COL)	10 April 1980 (aged 24)
John Gadret (FRA)	22 April 1979 (aged 25)
Vygantas Kaminskas (LTU)	1 August 1982 (aged 22)
Vytautas Kaupas (LTU)	1 April 1982 (aged 22)
Denys Kostyuk (UKR)	13 March 1982 (aged 22)

Rider	Date of birth
Robby Meul (BEL)	4 September 1981 (aged 23)
Claude Pauwels (BEL)	8 April 1980 (aged 24)
Stijn Penne (BEL)	30 August 1984 (aged 20)
Peter Ronsse (BEL)	9 February 1980 (aged 24)
Maksyim Rudenko (UKR)	12 October 1979 (aged 25)
Johan Svensson (SWE)	2 October 1979 (aged 25)
Steven Thys (BEL)	19 July 1978 (aged 26)
Raimondas Vilčinskas (LTU)	5 July 1977 (aged 27)
Stefan Wijnants (BEL)	27 March 1981 (aged 23)

== 2006 ==
Roster in 2006, age as of 1 January 2006:

Rider	Date of birth
Igor Abakoumov (BEL)	30 May 1981 (aged 24)
Michael Blanchy (BEL)	24 September 1981 (aged 24)
Yohan Cauquil (FRA)	4 March 1985 (aged 20)
Thierry De Groote (BEL)	9 May 1975 (aged 30)
David Derepas (FRA)	9 March 1978 (aged 27)
Jurgen François (BEL)	26 March 1985 (aged 20)
Hamish Haynes (GBR)	5 March 1974 (aged 31)
Johnny Hoogerland (NED)	13 May 1983 (aged 22)
Vytautas Kaupas (LTU)	1 April 1982 (aged 23)
Robby Meul (BEL)	4 September 1981 (aged 24)
Dimitry Muravyev (KAZ)	2 November 1979 (aged 26)

Rider	Date of birth
Sven Nevens (BEL)	25 October 1983 (aged 22)
Francesco Planckaert (BEL)	12 March 1982 (aged 23)
Peter Ronsse (BEL)	9 February 1980 (aged 25)
Bert Scheirlinckx (BEL)	1 November 1974 (aged 31)
Yevgeniy Sladkov (KAZ)	15 December 1983 (aged 22)
Jan Soetens (BEL)	7 January 1984 (aged 21)
Steven Thys (BEL)	19 July 1978 (aged 27)
Janek Tombak (EST)	22 July 1976 (aged 29)
Kevin Van der Slagmolen (BEL)	11 May 1980 (aged 25)
Jarno Van Mingeroet (BEL)	23 September 1977 (aged 28)

== 2007 ==
Roster in 2007, age as of 1 January 2007:

Rider	Date of birth
Edwig Cammaerts (BEL)	17 July 1987 (aged 19)
Yohan Cauquil (FRA)	4 March 1985 (aged 21)
Geoffrey Coupé (BEL)	26 January 1981 (aged 25)
Mathieu Criquielion (BEL)	27 April 1981 (aged 25)
Bram Deprez (BEL)	6 June 1986 (aged 20)
Mathieu Drouilly (FRA)	31 January 1986 (aged 20)
Denis Flahaut (FRA)	28 November 1978 (aged 28)
Jurgen François (BEL)	26 March 1985 (aged 21)
Grégory Habeaux (BEL)	20 October 1982 (aged 24)
Mario Ickx (BEL)	14 February 1984 (aged 22)
Vytautas Kaupas (LTU)	1 April 1982 (aged 24)

Rider	Date of birth
Eddy Lembo (FRA)	10 November 1980 (aged 26)
Jo Maes (BEL)	30 March 1995 (aged 11)
Sven Nevens (BEL)	25 October 1983 (aged 23)
Geert Omloop (BEL)	12 February 1974 (aged 32)
Jan Soetens (BEL)	7 January 1984 (aged 22)
Mindaugas Striška (LTU)	7 May 1984 (aged 22)
Janek Tombak (EST)	22 July 1976 (aged 30)
Kenny Van Braeckel (BEL)	12 November 1983 (aged 23)
Jarno Van Mingeroet (BEL)	23 September 1977 (aged 29)
Jukka Vastaranta (FIN)	29 March 1984 (aged 22)

== 2008 ==
Roster in 2008, age as of 1 January 2008:

Rider	Date of birth
Igor Abakoumov (BEL)	30 May 1981 (aged 26)
Yohan Cauquil (FRA)	4 March 1985 (aged 22)
Geoffrey Coupé (BEL)	26 January 1981 (aged 26)
Mathieu Criquielion (BEL)	27 April 1981 (aged 26)
Allan Davis (AUS)	27 July 1980 (aged 27)
Hans Dekkers (NED)	8 August 1981 (aged 26)
Frank Dressler-Lehnhof (GER)	30 September 1976 (aged 31)
Mathieu Drouilly (FRA)	31 January 1986 (aged 21)
Grégory Habeaux (BEL)	20 October 1982 (aged 25)
Vytautas Kaupas (LTU)	1 April 1982 (aged 25)
Kalle Kriit (EST)	13 November 1983 (aged 24)
Gennady Mikhaylov (RUS)	8 February 1974 (aged 33)

Rider	Date of birth
Jens Mouris (NED)	12 March 1980 (aged 27)
Sven Nevens (BEL)	25 October 1983 (aged 24)
Geert Omloop (BEL)	12 February 1974 (aged 33)
Martial Ricci-Poggi (FRA)	25 September 1980 (aged 27)
Mindaugas Striška (LTU)	7 May 1984 (aged 23)
Janek Tombak (EST)	22 July 1976 (aged 31)
Stefan van Dijk (NED)	22 January 1976 (aged 31)
Jarno Van Mingeroet (BEL)	23 September 1977 (aged 30)
Frank Vandenbroucke (BEL)	6 November 1974 (aged 33)
James Vanlandschoot (BEL)	26 August 1978 (aged 29)
Maxime Vantomme (BEL)	8 March 1986 (aged 21)
Geert Verheyen (BEL)	10 March 1973 (aged 34)
