= 2015 Wanty–Groupe Gobert season =

Wanty–Groupe Gobert
- 2015 season
- UCI code: WGG
- Status: UCI Professional Continental
- Manager: Jean-François Bourlaert
- Main sponsor(s): Wanty & Groupe Gobert
- Based: Belgium
- Bicycles: Kuota

Season victories
- One-day races: 3
- Stage race overall: -
- Stage race stages: 2

The 2015 season for the Wanty–Groupe Gobert cycling team began in February at the La Tropicale Amissa Bongo. The team participated in UCI Continental Circuits and UCI World Tour events when given a wildcard invitation.

== 2015 roster ==
Rider	Date of birth
Simone Antonini (ITA)	12 February 1991 (age 34)
Frederik Backaert (BEL)	13 March 1990 (age 35)
Jerôme Baugnies (BEL)	1 April 1987 (age 38)
Francis De Greef (BEL)	2 February 1985 (age 40)
Tim De Troyer (BEL)	11 August 1990 (age 35)
Tom Devriendt (BEL)	29 October 1991 (age 33)
Boris Dron (BEL)	17 March 1988 (age 37)
Yannick Eijssen (BEL)	26 June 1989 (age 36)
Enrico Gasparotto (ITA)	22 March 1982 (age 43)
Jan Ghyselinck (BEL)	24 February 1988 (age 37)
Roy Jans (BEL)	15 September 1990 (age 35)

Rider	Date of birth
Björn Leukemans (BEL)	1 July 1977 (age 48)
Marco Marcato (ITA)	11 February 1984 (age 41)
Marco Minnaard (NED)	11 April 1989 (age 36)
Danilo Napolitano (ITA)	31 January 1981 (age 44)
Fréderique Robert (BEL)	25 January 1989 (age 36)
Mirko Selvaggi (ITA)	11 February 1985 (age 40)
Lander Seynaeve (BEL)	29 May 1992 (age 33)
Kevin Van Melsen (BEL)	1 April 1987 (age 38)
James Vanlandschoot (BEL)	26 August 1978 (age 47)
Frederik Veuchelen (BEL)	4 September 1978 (age 47)

Riders who joined the team for the 2015 season

Rider	2014 team
Simone Antonini	neo-pro (Marchiol-Emisfero)
Tom Devriendt	neo-pro (Team 3M)
Boris Dron	neo-pro (Wallonie-Bruxelles)
Yannick Eijssen	BMC Racing Team
Enrico Gasparotto	Astana
Marco Marcato	Cannondale
Lander Seynaeve	neo-pro (EFC-OmegaPharma-Quick Step)

Riders who left the team during or after the 2014 season

Rider	2015 team
Thomas Degand	IAM Cycling
Laurens De Vreese	Astana
Jempy Drucker	BMC Racing Team
Jérôme Gilbert	Vérandas Willems
Grégory Habeaux	Wallonie-Bruxelles
Michel Kreder	Roompot-Orange
Wesley Kreder	Roompot-Orange
Kevin Seeldraeyers	Torku Sekerspor
Nico Sijmens	Retired

== Season victories ==
Date	Race	Competition	Rider	Country	Location
5 February	Étoile de Bessèges, Stage 2	UCI Europe Tour	Roy Jans (BEL)	France	Les Fumades
18 April	Tour du Finistère	UCI Europe Tour	Tim De Troyer (BEL)	France	Quimper
17 May	Bayern–Rundfahrt, Mountains classification	UCI Europe Tour	Frederik Veuchelen (BEL)	Germany	
7 June	Boucles de la Mayenne, Stage 3	UCI Europe Tour	Danilo Napolitano (ITA)	France	Laval
7 June	Tour de Luxembourg, Points classification	UCI Europe Tour	Enrico Gasparotto (ITA)	Luxembourg	
14 June	Ronde van Limburg	UCI Europe Tour	Björn Leukemans (BEL)	Belgium	Tongeren
26 August	Druivenkoers Overijse	UCI Europe Tour	Jérôme Baugnies (BEL)	Belgium	Overijse
