= 2016 Direct Énergie season =

Direct Énergie
- 2016 season
- UCI code: DEN
- Status: UCI Professional Continental
- Manager: Jean-René Bernaudeau
- Based: France
- Bicycles: Colnago

Season victories
- One-day races: 1
- Stage race overall: 6
- Stage race stages: 18

The 2016 season for the Direct Énergie cycling team began in January at the La Tropicale Amissa Bongo. Team Europcar is a French-registered UCI Professional Continental cycling team that participated in road bicycle racing events on the UCI Continental Circuits and when selected as a wildcard to UCI ProTour events.

The sponsor on jerseys is Poweo in the cycling races taking place in Belgium.

== Team roster ==
Rider	Date of birth
Ryan Anderson (CAN)	22 July 1987 (aged 28)
Thomas Boudat (FRA)	24 February 1994 (aged 21)
Lilian Calmejane (FRA)	6 December 1992 (aged 23)
Romain Cardis (FRA)	12 August 1992 (aged 23)
Sylvain Chavanel (FRA)	30 June 1979 (aged 36)
Bryan Coquard (FRA)	25 April 1992 (aged 23)
Jérémy Cornu (FRA)	7 August 1991 (aged 24)
Antoine Duchesne (CAN)	12 September 1991 (aged 24)
Yohann Gène (FRA)	25 June 1981 (aged 34)
Fabien Grellier (FRA)	31 October 1994 (aged 21)
Romain Guillemois (FRA)	28 March 1991 (aged 24)

Rider	Date of birth
Tony Hurel (FRA)	1 November 1987 (aged 28)
Fabrice Jeandesboz (FRA)	4 December 1984 (aged 31)
Julien Morice (FRA)	20 July 1991 (aged 24)
Bryan Nauleau (FRA)	17 March 1988 (aged 27)
Adrien Petit (FRA)	26 September 1990 (aged 25)
Alexandre Pichot (FRA)	6 January 1983 (aged 32)
Perrig Quéméneur (FRA)	26 April 1984 (aged 31)
Romain Sicard (FRA)	1 January 1988 (aged 28)
Guillaume Thévenot (FRA)	13 September 1993 (aged 22)
Angelo Tulik (FRA)	2 December 1990 (aged 25)
Thomas Voeckler (FRA)	22 June 1979 (aged 36)

Riders who joined the team for the 2016 season

Rider	2015 team
Romain Cardis	neo-pro (Vendée U)
Lilian Calmejane	neo-pro (Vendée U)
Adrien Petit	Cofidis
Sylvain Chavanel	IAM Cycling
Fabien Grellier	neo-pro (Vendée U)
Jérémy Cornu	neo-pro (Vendée U)

Riders who left the team during or after the 2015 season

Rider	2016 team
Maxime Méderel	Retired
Yannick Martinez	Delko–Marseille Provence KTM
Jérôme Cousin	Cofidis
Jimmy Engoulvent	Retired
Morgan Lamoisson	Retired
Giovanni Bernaudeau	Retired
Dan Craven	Cycling Academy
Vincent Jérôme	Retired
Cyril Gautier	AG2R La Mondiale
Pierre Rolland	Cannondale
Yukiya Arashiro	Lampre–Merida

== Season victories ==
Date	Race	Competition	Rider	Country	Location
20 January	La Tropicale Amissa Bongo, Stage 3	UCI Africa Tour	Adrien Petit (FRA)	Gabon	Ndjolé
22 January	La Tropicale Amissa Bongo, Stage 5	UCI Africa Tour	Adrien Petit (FRA)	Gabon	Oyem
23 January	La Tropicale Amissa Bongo, Stage 6	UCI Africa Tour	Adrien Petit (FRA)	Gabon	Stade de l'Amitié
24 January	La Tropicale Amissa Bongo, Overall	UCI Africa Tour	Adrien Petit (FRA)	Gabon	
24 January	La Tropicale Amissa Bongo, Teams classification	UCI Africa Tour	(Note: The riders on the squad were Thomas Voeckler, Yohann Gène, Tony Hurel, Bryan Nauleau, Adrien Petit and Alexandre Pichot)	Gabon	
3 February	Étoile de Bessèges, Stage 1	UCI Europe Tour	Bryan Coquard (FRA)	France	Beaucaire
4 February	Étoile de Bessèges, Stage 2	UCI Europe Tour	Bryan Coquard (FRA)	France	Méjannes-le-Clap
5 February	Étoile de Bessèges, Stage 3	UCI Europe Tour	Sylvain Chavanel (FRA)	France	Bessèges
7 February	Étoile de Bessèges, Points classification	UCI Europe Tour	Bryan Coquard (FRA)	France	
14 February	La Méditerranéenne, Young rider classification	UCI Europe Tour	Lilian Calmejane (FRA)	SpainFranceItaly	
23 February	Tour La Provence, Stage 1	UCI Europe Tour	Thomas Voeckler (FRA)	France	Cassis
25 February	Tour La Provence, Overall	UCI Europe Tour	Thomas Voeckler (FRA)	France	Marseille
13 March	Paris–Nice, Mountains classification	UCI World Tour	Antoine Duchesne (CAN)	France	
1 April	Route Adélie de Vitré	UCI Europe Tour	Bryan Coquard (FRA)	France	Vitré
6 April	Circuit de la Sarthe, Stage 2a	UCI Europe Tour	Bryan Coquard (FRA)	France	Angers
1 May	Tour de Yorkshire, Stage 3	UCI Europe Tour	Thomas Voeckler (FRA)	United Kingdom	Scarborough
1 May	Tour de Yorkshire, Overall	UCI Europe Tour	Thomas Voeckler (FRA)	United Kingdom	
4 May	Four Days of Dunkirk, Stage 1	UCI Europe Tour	Bryan Coquard (FRA)	France	Gravelines
5 May	Four Days of Dunkirk, Stage 2	UCI Europe Tour	Bryan Coquard (FRA)	France	Aniche
6 May	Four Days of Dunkirk, Stage 3	UCI Europe Tour	Bryan Coquard (FRA)	France	Saint-Pol-sur-Ternoise
8 May	Four Days of Dunkirk, Overall	UCI Europe Tour	Bryan Coquard (FRA)	France	
8 May	Four Days of Dunkirk, Points classification	UCI Europe Tour	Bryan Coquard (FRA)	France	
8 May	Four Days of Dunkirk, Young rider classification	UCI Europe Tour	Bryan Coquard (FRA)	France	
2 June	Boucles de la Mayenne, Prologue	UCI Europe Tour	Bryan Coquard (FRA)	France	Laval
4 June	Boucles de la Mayenne, Stage 2	UCI Europe Tour	Bryan Coquard (FRA)	France	Villaines-la-Juhel
5 June	Boucles de la Mayenne, Overall	UCI Europe Tour	Bryan Coquard (FRA)	France	
5 June	Boucles de la Mayenne, Points classification	UCI Europe Tour	Bryan Coquard (FRA)	France	
5 June	Boucles de la Mayenne, Young rider classification	UCI Europe Tour	Thomas Boudat (FRA)	France	
5 June	Boucles de la Mayenne, Teams classification	UCI Europe Tour	(Note: The riders on the squad were Thomas Boudat, Bryan Coquard, Yohann Gène, Alexandre Pichot, Adrien Petit and Angelo Tulik)	France	
16 June	Route du Sud, Stage 1	UCI Europe Tour	Bryan Coquard (FRA)	France	Bessières
17 June	Route du Sud, Stage 2	UCI Europe Tour	Bryan Coquard (FRA)	France	Albi
23 August	Vuelta a España, Stage 4	UCI World Tour	Lilian Calmejane (FRA)	Spain	San Andrés de Teixido
25 August	Tour du Poitou-Charentes, Stage 4	UCI Europe Tour	Sylvain Chavanel (FRA)	France	Châtellerault
26 August	Tour du Poitou-Charentes, Overall	UCI Europe Tour	Sylvain Chavanel (FRA)	France	

== National, Continental and World champions 2016 ==
Date	Discipline	Jersey	Rider	Country	Location
21 August	French National Under–23 Road Championships		Paul Ourselin (FRA)	France	Civaux
