= Johan Svensson =

Johan Svensson may refer to:

- Johan Svensson (cyclist) (born 1979), Swedish professional road-racing cyclist
- Johan Svensson (footballer) (born 1981), Swedish footballer
- Johan Svensson (Swedish Air Force officer) (born 1962), Swedish Air Force officer
- Johan Rudolf Svensson (1899–1978), Swedish Olympic wrestler and actor
