= Soetens =

Soetens is a surname. Notable people with the surname include:

- Jan Soetens (born 1984), Belgian cyclist
- René Soetens (born 1948), Canadian politician
- Robert Soetens (1897–1997), French violinist
