= Seynaeve =

Seynaeve is a surname. Notable people with the surname include:

- Lander Seynaeve (born 1992), Belgian cyclist
- Marcel Seynaeve (1933–2015), Belgian cyclist
- Maurice Seynaeve (1907–1998), Belgian cyclist
