= Blanchy =

Blanchy is a surname and may refer to:

- François Blanchy (1886–1960), French tennis player
- Frédéric Blanchy (1868–1944), French sailor
- Michael Blanchy (born 1981), Belgian former professional road cyclist
- Pierre Blanchy (1897–1981), French politician

== See also ==
- Letter to Blanchy, 1990s New Zealand programme
