= Equipo Bolivia =

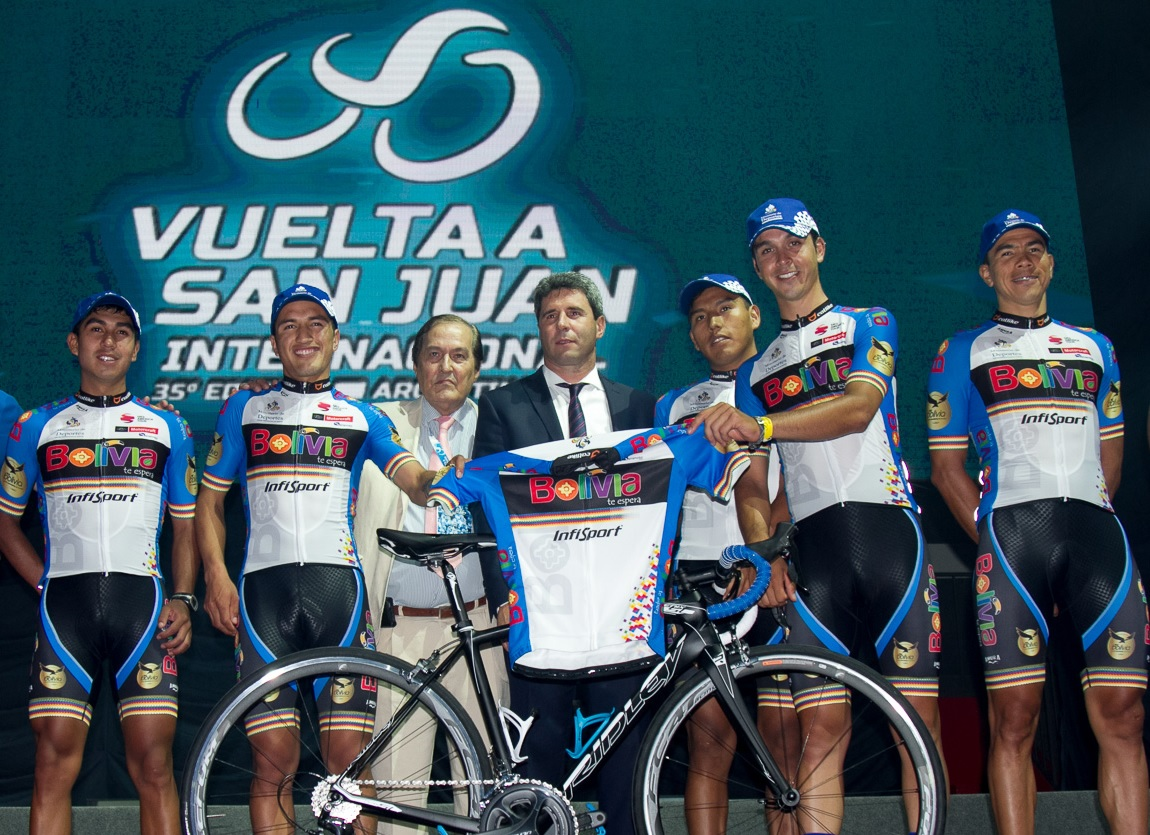

Team information
- UCI code: BOL
- Registered: Bolivia
- Founded: 2017
- Discipline: Road
- Status: UCI Continental

Key personnel
- General manager: Laudelino Cubino
- Team manager: Javier Murguialday

Team name history
- 2017–: Equipo Bolivia

Equipo Bolivia is a Bolivian UCI Continental cycling team established in 2017.

== Team roster ==
Rider	Date of birth
Carlos Amurrio (BOL)	21 October 1993 (age 32)
Javier Arando (BOL)	24 February 1994 (age 32)
Piter Campero (BOL)	12 January 1991 (age 35)
Egoitz García (ESP)	31 March 1986 (age 40)

Rider	Date of birth
Ivan Martinez Jimenez (ESP)	8 September 1985 (age 40)
Nuno Meireles (POR)	13 August 1991 (age 35)
Checa Sandro (BOL)	27 April 1995 (age 31)
Gilver Zurita (BOL)	30 December 1986 (age 39)
