= Egoitz García =

Spanish cyclist

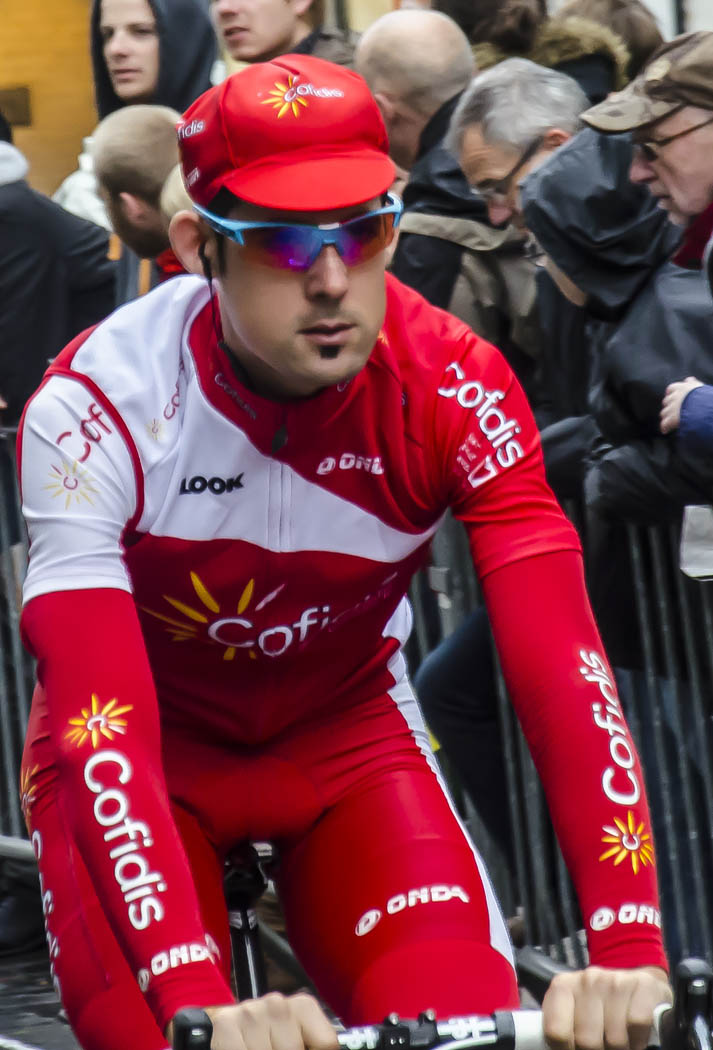
- Egoitz García (2014).

Personal information
- Full name: Egoitz García Echeguibel
- Born: 31 March 1986 (age 40) Barakaldo, Spain
- Height: 1.80 m (5 ft 11 in)
- Weight: 70 kg (154 lb; 11 st 0 lb)

Cycling career
- Sport: Cycling
- Discipline: Road
- Role: Rider

Amateur teams
- 2009: ECP
- 2009: Andorra–Grandvalira

Professional teams
- 2010–2011: Caja Rural
- 2012–2014: Cofidis
- 2015: Murias Taldea
- 2016: Al Marakeb Cycling Team
- 2017: Equipo Bolivia

Major wins
- Paris–Corrèze (2012)

Egoitz García Echeguibel (born 31 March 1986) is a Spanish professional road bicycle racer who last rode for UCI Continental team Equipo Bolivia. He formerly rode for UCI Professional Continental Team Cofidis.

Born in Barakaldo, García has competed as a professional since the start of the 2010 season, riding as a member of the Caja Rural squad for two seasons before joining Cofidis for the 2012 season. In August 2012, García took his first victory for the team, by winning the two-stage Paris–Corrèze race in France; having finished with the peloton in stage one, García finished second to FDJ–BigMat's Kenny Elissonde on the final stage, after the pair had broken away from the main field. In December 2014 it was announced that García would join the new Basque-based Murias Taldea team for 2015.

== Career achievements ==
=== Major results ===
2004
3rd National Junior Time Trial Championships
2007
1st Stage 1 Vuelta Ciclista a Valladolid
2009
1st GP Macario
2010
7th Gran Premio de Llodio
2011
7th Overall Tour of Turkey
8th Cholet-Pays de Loire
2012
1st Overall Paris–Corrèze
2013
3rd Circuito de Getxo
4th Trofeo Campos–Santanyí–Ses Salines
4th Trofeo Platja de Muro
7th Overall Tour du Haut Var
10th Omloop Het Nieuwsblad
10th Prueba Villafranca de Ordizia
2014
3rd Overall La Tropicale Amissa Bongo
9th Omloop Het Nieuwsblad
2015
7th National Road Race Championships
9th Circuito de Getxo

=== Grand Tour general classification results timeline ===
Grand Tour	2012	2013
Giro d'Italia	—	—
Tour de France	—	115
Vuelta a España	101	—

Legend
—	Did not compete
DNF	Did not finish
