= Sven Jodts =

Belgian cyclist

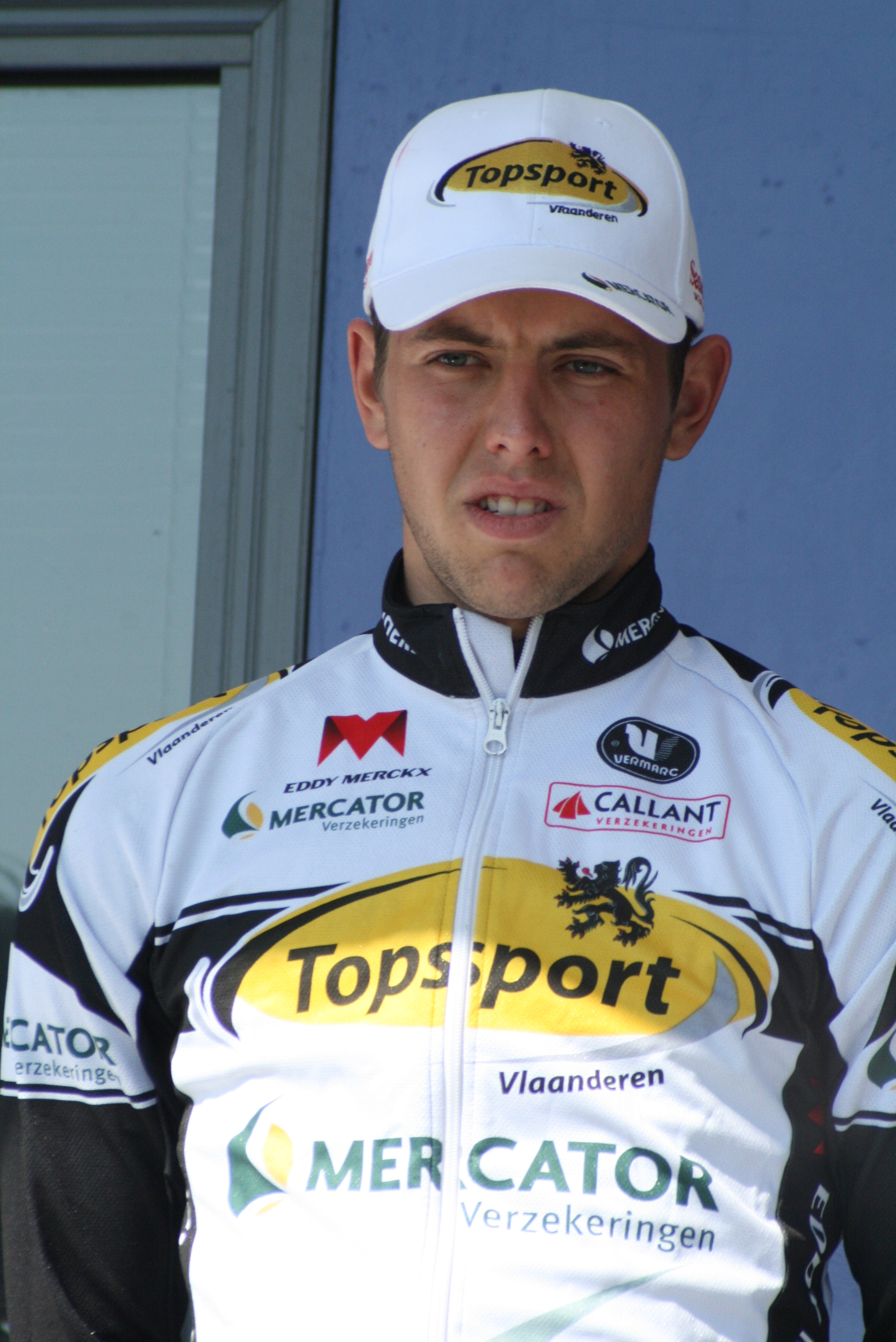
- Jodts in 2011

Personal information
- Full name: Sven Jodts
- Born: 14 October 1988 (age 38) Veurne, Belgium
- Height: 1.80 m (5 ft 11 in)
- Weight: 74 kg (163 lb)

Cycling career
- Sport: Cycling
- Current team: Retired
- Discipline: Road
- Role: Rider

Amateur team
- 2008–2010: Beveren 2000–Quick-Step

Professional teams
- 2011–2012: Topsport Vlaanderen–Mercator
- 2013: Colba–Superano Ham

Sven Jodts (born 14 October 1988 in Veurne) is a Belgian former professional cyclist.

== Major results ==
2007
1st Stage 3 Triptyque des Barrages
2008
1st Stage 4 Tour du Haut-Anjou
2009
1st Stage 3 Tour de Moselle
2010
1st Internationale Wielertrofee Jong Maar Moedig
1st Stage 8 Tour de Normandie
3rd Brussel–Opwijk
2011
3rd Beverbeek Classic
