= 2014 La Tropicale Amissa Bongo =

Race details
- Dates: January 13 – January 19
- Stages: 7
- Distance: 960.3 km (596.7 mi)
- Winning time: 22h 52' 24"

Results
Jersey awarded to the overall winner	Winner	Natnael Berhane (ERI)	(Team Europcar)
	Second	Luis León Sánchez (ESP)	(Caja Rural–Seguros RGA)
	Third	Egoitz García (ESP)	(Cofidis)
Jersey awarded to the points classification winner	Points	Roy Jans (BEL)	(Wanty–Groupe Gobert)
Jersey awarded to the mountains classification winner	Mountains	Marco Minnaard (NED)	(Wanty–Groupe Gobert)
Jersey awarded to the youth classification winner	Youth	Florian Sénéchal (FRA)	(Cofidis)
Jersey awarded to the sprints classification winner	Sprints	Natnael Berhane (ERI)	(Team Europcar)
	Team	Team Europcar	

The 2014 La Tropicale Amissa Bongo took place from 13 to 19 January 2014, and was the ninth edition of La Tropicale Amissa Bongo. This edition of the race consisted of seven stages.

== Participating teams ==
Fourteen teams competed in the 2014 La Tropicale Amissa Bongo; six professional teams took part along with eight national selection teams.

The 14 teams invited to the race were:

- Burkina Faso (national team)
- Caja Rural–Seguros RGA
- Cameroon (national team)
- Cofidis
- Côte d'Ivoire (national team)
- Eritrea (national team)
- Team Europcar
- Gabon (national team)
- Morocco (national team)
- MTN–Qhubeka
- Namibia (national team)
- Rwanda (national team)
- Vélo Club Sovac
- Wanty–Groupe Gobert

== Stages ==
=== Stage 1 ===
13 January 2014 — Bitam to Ebolowa (Cameroon), 149.2 km (92.7 mi)

Stage 1 Result

	Rider	Team	Time
1	Luis León Sánchez (ESP)	Caja Rural–Seguros RGA	3h 32' 35"
2	Egoitz García (ESP)	Cofidis	s.t.
3	Natnael Berhane (ERI)	Team Europcar	s.t.
4	Linus Gerdemann (GER)	MTN–Qhubeka	s.t.
5	Grégory Habeaux (BEL)	Wanty–Groupe Gobert	s.t.
6	Fabrice Jeandesboz (FRA)	Team Europcar	+ 4"
7	Jérôme Baugnies (BEL)	Wanty–Groupe Gobert	+ 53"
8	Florian Sénéchal (FRA)	Cofidis	+ 53"
9	Fréderique Robert (BEL)	Wanty–Groupe Gobert	+ 2' 46"
10	Giovanni Bernaudeau (FRA)	Team Europcar	+ 2' 46"

General Classification after Stage 1

	Rider	Team	Time
1	Egoitz García (ESP)	Cofidis	3h 32' 24"
2	Luis León Sánchez (ESP)	Caja Rural–Seguros RGA	+ 1"
3	Natnael Berhane (ERI)	Team Europcar	+ 7"
4	Linus Gerdemann (GER)	MTN–Qhubeka	+ 11"
5	Grégory Habeaux (BEL)	Wanty–Groupe Gobert	+ 11"
6	Fabrice Jeandesboz (FRA)	Team Europcar	+ 15"
7	Florian Sénéchal (FRA)	Cofidis	+ 57"
8	Jérôme Baugnies (BEL)	Wanty–Groupe Gobert	+ 58"
9	Fréderique Robert (BEL)	Wanty–Groupe Gobert	+ 2' 57"
10	Giovanni Bernaudeau (FRA)	Team Europcar	+ 2' 57"

=== Stage 2 ===
14 January 2014 — Awoua to Oyem, 120 km (74.6 mi)

Stage 2 Result

	Rider	Team	Time
1	Jérôme Baugnies (BEL)	Wanty–Groupe Gobert	2h 54' 25"
2	Luis León Sánchez (ESP)	Caja Rural–Seguros RGA	s.t.
3	Natnael Berhane (ERI)	Team Europcar	s.t.
4	Roy Jans (BEL)	Wanty–Groupe Gobert	s.t.
5	Meron Amanuel (ERI)	Eritrea (national team)	s.t.
6	Giovanni Bernaudeau (FRA)	Team Europcar	s.t.
7	Salah Eddine Mraouni (MAR)	Morocco (national team)	s.t.
8	Metkel Eyob (ERI)	Eritrea (national team)	s.t.
9	Florian Sénéchal (FRA)	Cofidis	s.t.
10	Reda Aadel (MAR)	Morocco (national team)	s.t.

General Classification after Stage 2

	Rider	Team	Time
1	Luis León Sánchez (ESP)	Caja Rural–Seguros RGA	6h 26' 44"
2	Egoitz García (ESP)	Cofidis	+ 5"
3	Natnael Berhane (ERI)	Team Europcar	+ 8"
4	Linus Gerdemann (GER)	MTN–Qhubeka	+ 16"
5	Grégory Habeaux (BEL)	Wanty–Groupe Gobert	+ 16"
6	Fabrice Jeandesboz (FRA)	Team Europcar	+ 20"
7	Jérôme Baugnies (BEL)	Wanty–Groupe Gobert	+ 53"
8	Florian Sénéchal (FRA)	Cofidis	+ 1' 02"
9	Giovanni Bernaudeau (FRA)	Team Europcar	+ 3' 02"
10	Salah Eddine Mraouni (MAR)	Morocco (national team)	+ 3' 02"

=== Stage 3 ===
15 January 2014 — Ndjolé to Lambaréné, 132.5 km (82.3 mi)

Stage 3 Result

	Rider	Team	Time
1	Roy Jans (BEL)	Wanty–Groupe Gobert	3h 19' 16"
2	Jérôme Baugnies (BEL)	Wanty–Groupe Gobert	s.t.
3	Egoitz García (ESP)	Cofidis	s.t.
4	Yohann Gène (FRA)	Team Europcar	s.t.
5	Florian Sénéchal (FRA)	Cofidis	s.t.
6	Rasmané Ouedraogo (BUR)	Burkina Faso (national team)	s.t.
7	Youcef Reguigui (ALG)	MTN–Qhubeka	s.t.
8	Giovanni Bernaudeau (FRA)	Team Europcar	s.t.
9	Reda Aadel (MAR)	Morocco (national team)	s.t.
10	Luis León Sánchez (ESP)	Caja Rural–Seguros RGA	s.t.

General Classification after Stage 3

	Rider	Team	Time
1	Luis León Sánchez (ESP)	Caja Rural–Seguros RGA	9h 46' 00"
2	Egoitz García (ESP)	Cofidis	+ 1"
3	Natnael Berhane (ERI)	Team Europcar	+ 8"
4	Linus Gerdemann (GER)	MTN–Qhubeka	+ 16"
5	Grégory Habeaux (BEL)	Wanty–Groupe Gobert	+ 16"
6	Fabrice Jeandesboz (FRA)	Team Europcar	+ 20"
7	Jérôme Baugnies (BEL)	Wanty–Groupe Gobert	+ 47"
8	Florian Sénéchal (FRA)	Cofidis	+ 1' 02"
9	Giovanni Bernaudeau (FRA)	Team Europcar	+ 3' 02"
10	Reda Aadel (MAR)	Morocco (national team)	+ 3' 02"

=== Stage 4 ===
16 January 2014 — Lambaréné to Mouila, 190.4 km (118.3 mi)

Stage 4 Result

	Rider	Team	Time
1	Frekalsi Debesay (ERI)	MTN–Qhubeka	4h 42' 36"
2	Mouhssine Lahsaini (MAR)	Morocco (national team)	+ 2"
3	Marco Minnaard (NED)	Wanty–Groupe Gobert	+ 3"
4	Hervé Mba (CMR)	Cameroon (national team)	+ 3"
5	Louis Verhelst (BEL)	Cofidis	+ 3"
6	Raul Seibeb (NAM)	Namibia (national team)	+ 3"
7	Romain Guillemois (FRA)	Team Europcar	+ 3"
8	Valens Ndayisenga (RWA)	Rwanda (national team)	+ 10"
9	Roy Jans (BEL)	Wanty–Groupe Gobert	+ 6' 40"
10	Youcef Reguigui (ALG)	MTN–Qhubeka	+ 6' 40"

General Classification after Stage 4

	Rider	Team	Time
1	Luis León Sánchez (ESP)	Caja Rural–Seguros RGA	14h 35' 16"
2	Egoitz García (ESP)	Cofidis	+ 1"
3	Natnael Berhane (ERI)	Team Europcar	+ 8"
4	Linus Gerdemann (GER)	MTN–Qhubeka	+ 16"
5	Grégory Habeaux (BEL)	Wanty–Groupe Gobert	+ 16"
6	Fabrice Jeandesboz (FRA)	Team Europcar	+ 20"
7	Jérôme Baugnies (BEL)	Wanty–Groupe Gobert	+ 47"
8	Florian Sénéchal (FRA)	Cofidis	+ 1' 02"
9	Giovanni Bernaudeau (FRA)	Team Europcar	+ 3' 02"
10	Salah Eddine Mraouni (MAR)	Morocco (national team)	+ 3' 02"

=== Stage 5 ===
17 January 2014 — Lambaréné to Kango, 143 km (88.9 mi)

Stage 5 Result

	Rider	Team	Time
1	Bonaventure Uwizeyimana (RWA)	Rwanda (national team)	3h 16' 31"
2	Mouhssine Lahsaini (MAR)	Morocco (national team)	+ 5"
3	Tim De Troyer (BEL)	Wanty–Groupe Gobert	+ 26"
4	Yohann Gène (FRA)	Team Europcar	+ 26"
5	Meron Teshome (ERI)	Eritrea (national team)	+ 26"
6	Youcef Reguigui (ALG)	MTN–Qhubeka	+ 26"
7	Adrien Petit (FRA)	Cofidis	+ 26"
8	Karim Hadjbouzit (ALG)	Vélo Club Sovac	+ 26"
9	Issaka Kabré (BUR)	Burkina Faso (national team)	+ 31"
10	Bryan Nauleau (FRA)	Team Europcar	+ 31"

General Classification after Stage 5

	Rider	Team	Time
1	Luis León Sánchez (ESP)	Caja Rural–Seguros RGA	17h 57' 46"
2	Egoitz García (ESP)	Cofidis	+ 1"
3	Natnael Berhane (ERI)	Team Europcar	+ 7"
4	Grégory Habeaux (BEL)	Wanty–Groupe Gobert	+ 17"
5	Linus Gerdemann (GER)	MTN–Qhubeka	+ 18"
6	Fabrice Jeandesboz (FRA)	Team Europcar	+ 22"
7	Jérôme Baugnies (BEL)	Wanty–Groupe Gobert	+ 49"
8	Florian Sénéchal (FRA)	Cofidis	+ 1' 04"
9	Dan Craven (NAM)	Namibia (national team)	+ 3' 01"
10	Giovanni Bernaudeau (FRA)	Team Europcar	+ 3' 04"

=== Stage 6 ===
18 January 2014 — Port-Gentil to Port-Gentil, 106 km (65.9 mi)

Stage 6 Result

	Rider	Team	Time
1	Fréderique Robert (BEL)	Wanty–Groupe Gobert	2h 19' 56"
2	Roy Jans (BEL)	Wanty–Groupe Gobert	s.t.
3	Tarik Chaoufi (MAR)	Morocco (national team)	s.t.
4	Giovanni Bernaudeau (FRA)	Team Europcar	s.t.
5	Tim De Troyer (BEL)	Wanty–Groupe Gobert	s.t.
6	Bryan Nauleau (FRA)	Team Europcar	s.t.
7	Amanuel Ghebreigzabhier (ERI)	Eritrea (national team)	s.t.
8	Frekalsi Debesay (ERI)	MTN–Qhubeka	s.t.
9	Tesfom Okubamariam (ERI)	Eritrea (national team)	s.t.
10	Javier Aramendia (ESP)	Caja Rural–Seguros RGA	s.t.

General Classification after Stage 6

	Rider	Team	Time
1	Luis León Sánchez (ESP)	Caja Rural–Seguros RGA	20h 19' 34"
2	Egoitz García (ESP)	Cofidis	+ 1"
3	Natnael Berhane (ERI)	Team Europcar	+ 4"
4	Grégory Habeaux (BEL)	Wanty–Groupe Gobert	+ 20"
5	Linus Gerdemann (GER)	MTN–Qhubeka	+ 21"
6	Fabrice Jeandesboz (FRA)	Team Europcar	+ 25"
7	Jérôme Baugnies (BEL)	Wanty–Groupe Gobert	+ 52"
8	Florian Sénéchal (FRA)	Cofidis	+ 1' 07"
9	Giovanni Bernaudeau (FRA)	Team Europcar	+ 1' 12"
10	Dan Craven (NAM)	Namibia (national team)	+ 3' 04"

=== Stage 7 ===
19 January 2014 — Owendo to Libreville, 124 km (77.1 mi)

Stage 7 Result

	Rider	Team	Time
1	Fréderique Robert (BEL)	Wanty–Groupe Gobert	2h 32' 52"
2	Roy Jans (BEL)	Wanty–Groupe Gobert	s.t.
3	Meron Amanuel (ERI)	Eritrea (national team)	s.t.
4	Luis León Sánchez (ESP)	Caja Rural–Seguros RGA	s.t.
5	Egoitz García (ESP)	Cofidis	s.t.
6	Rasmané Ouedraogo (BUR)	Burkina Faso (national team)	s.t.
7	Natnael Berhane (ERI)	Team Europcar	s.t.
8	Bonaventure Uwizeyimana (RWA)	Rwanda (national team)	s.t.
9	Salah Eddine Mraouni (MAR)	Morocco (national team)	s.t.
10	Frekalsi Debesay (ERI)	MTN–Qhubeka	s.t.

Final General Classification

	Rider	Team	Time
1	Natnael Berhane (ERI)	Team Europcar	22h 52' 24"
2	Luis León Sánchez (ESP)	Caja Rural–Seguros RGA	+ 1"
3	Egoitz García (ESP)	Cofidis	+ 2"
4	Grégory Habeaux (BEL)	Wanty–Groupe Gobert	+ 22"
5	Linus Gerdemann (GER)	MTN–Qhubeka	+ 23"
6	Fabrice Jeandesboz (FRA)	Team Europcar	+ 27"
7	Jérôme Baugnies (BEL)	Wanty–Groupe Gobert	+ 54"
8	Florian Sénéchal (FRA)	Cofidis	+ 1' 09"
9	Giovanni Bernaudeau (FRA)	Team Europcar	+ 1' 45"
10	Salah Eddine Mraouni (MAR)	Morocco (national team)	+ 3' 06"
