= Jérémy Cornu =

French cyclist

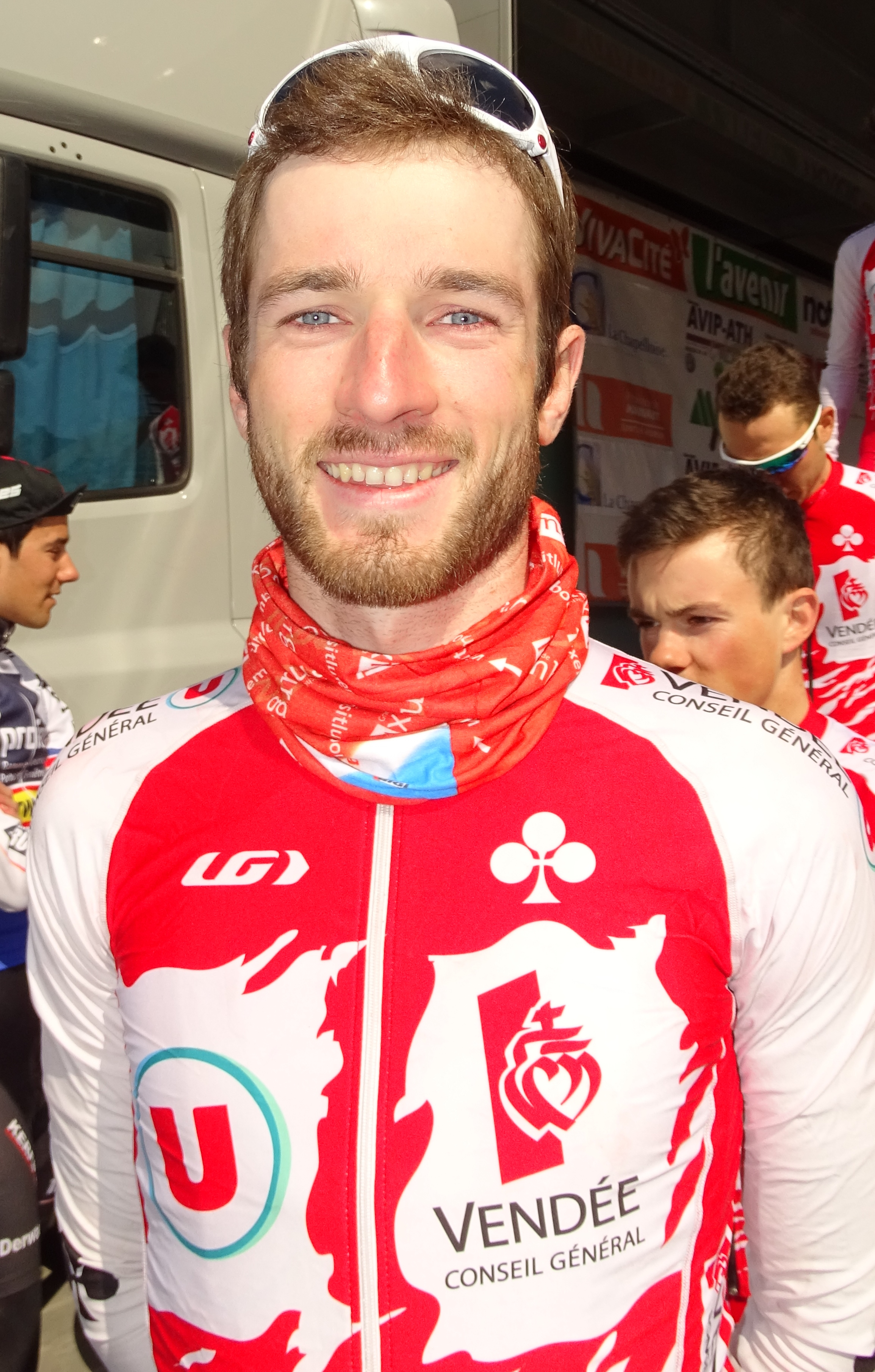
- Cornu in 2015.

Personal information
- Full name: Jérémy Cornu
- Born: August 7, 1991 (age 35) Lisieux, France
- Height: 1.78 m (5 ft 10 in)
- Weight: 66 kg (146 lb)

Cycling career
- Sport: Cycling
- Current team: Retired
- Discipline: Road
- Role: Rider

Amateur teams
- 2009: Occitane CF
- 2010–2015: Vendée U
- 2019: Team UC Nantes Atlantique

Professional teams
- 2014: Team Europcar (stagiaire)
- 2016–2018: Direct Énergie

Jérémy Cornu (born August 7, 1991, in Lisieux) is a French former cyclist, who rode professionally for the Direct Énergie team between 2016 and 2018.

== Major results ==
2015
5th Overall Tour de Normandie
6th Overall Le Triptyque des Monts et Châteaux
9th Overall Tour de Gironde
10th Overall Flèche du Sud
2017
1st Stage 1 Rhône-Alpes Isère Tour
10th Tour du Finistère
2018
3rd Overall Circuit des Ardennes

1st Stage 3

6th Tour du Finistère
