= Johan Svensson (cyclist) =

Swedish cyclist

Personal information
- Born: October 2, 1979 (age 47) Falkenberg, Sweden

Cycling career
- Sport: Cycling
- Current team: Retired
- Role: Rider

Johan Svensson (born 2 October 1979 in Falkenberg) is a Swedish professional road-racing cyclist. He was on the 2005 Mitsubishi–Jartazi roster.
