= Bessières, Haute-Garonne =

Bessières Becièras (Occitan)
- Commune
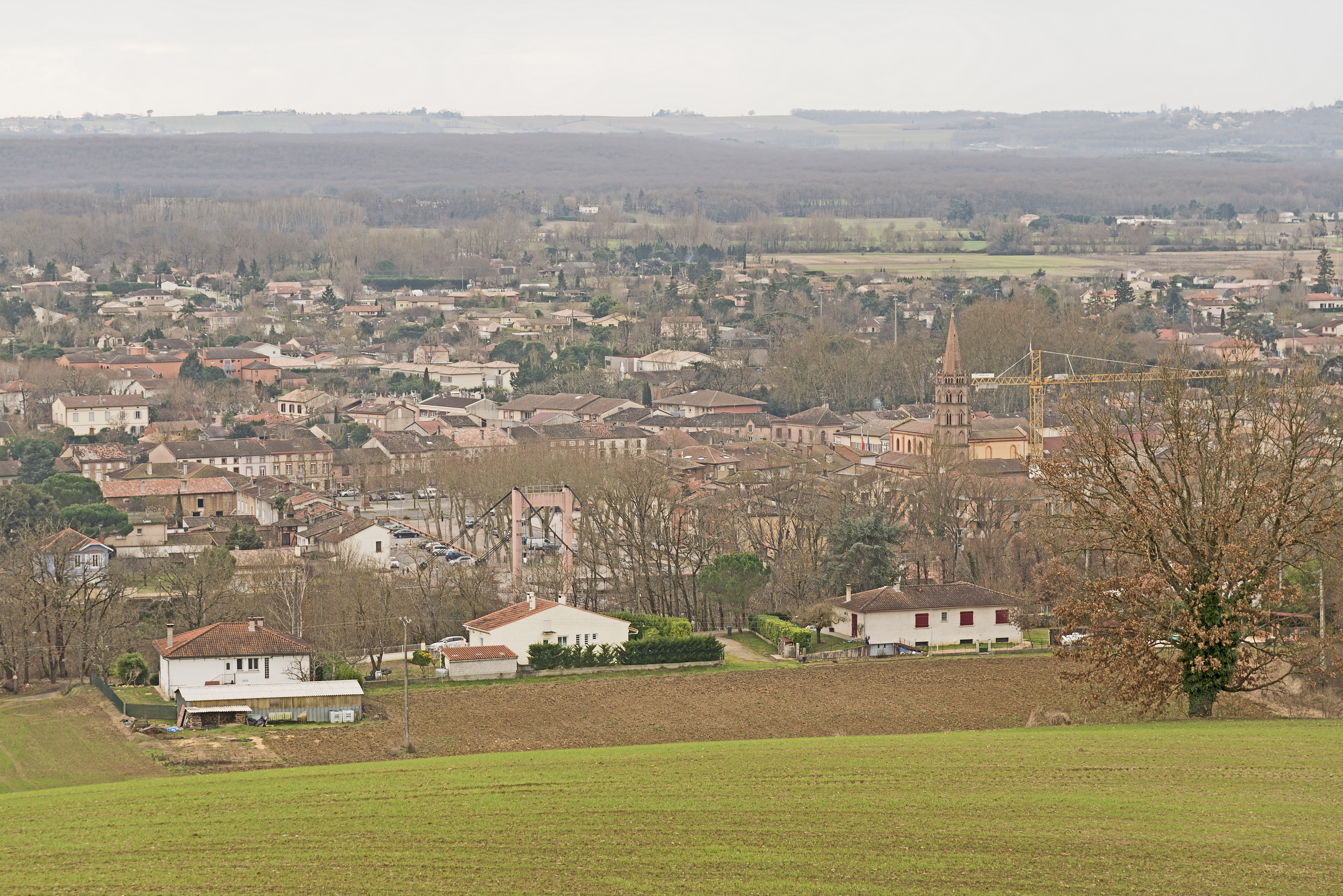
- A general view of Bessières

- Coat of arms
- Location of Bessières
- Location within France Location within Occitanie
- Coordinates: 43°48′05″N 1°36′24″E
- Country: France
- Region: Occitania
- Department: Haute-Garonne
- Arrondissement: Toulouse
- Canton: Villemur-sur-Tarn

Government
  - Mayor (2020–2026): Cédric Maurel
- Area^{1}: 16.68 km^{2} (6.44 sq mi)
- Elevation: 108 m (354 ft)
- Highest elevation: 194 m (636 ft)
- Lowest elevation: 85 m (279 ft)
- Population (2023): 4,310
  - Density: 258/km^{2} (669/sq mi)
- Time zone: UTC+01:00 (CET)
  - Summer (DST): UTC+02:00 (CEST)
- INSEE/Postal code: 31066 /31660
- ^{1} French Land Register data, which excludes lakes, ponds, glaciers > 1 km^{2} (0.386 sq mi or 247 acres) and river estuaries.

Bessières (French pronunciation: [bɛsjɛʁ]; Occitan: Becièras) is a commune in the Haute-Garonne department in southwestern France.

== Population ==
Historical population
Year	Pop.	±% p.a.
1968	1,456	—
1975	1,595	+1.31%
1982	1,841	+2.07%
1990	2,009	+1.10%
1999	2,222	+1.13%
2007	3,069	+4.12%
2012	3,472	+2.50%
2017	4,073	+3.24%
2023	4,310	+0.95%
Source: INSEE

== Sights ==
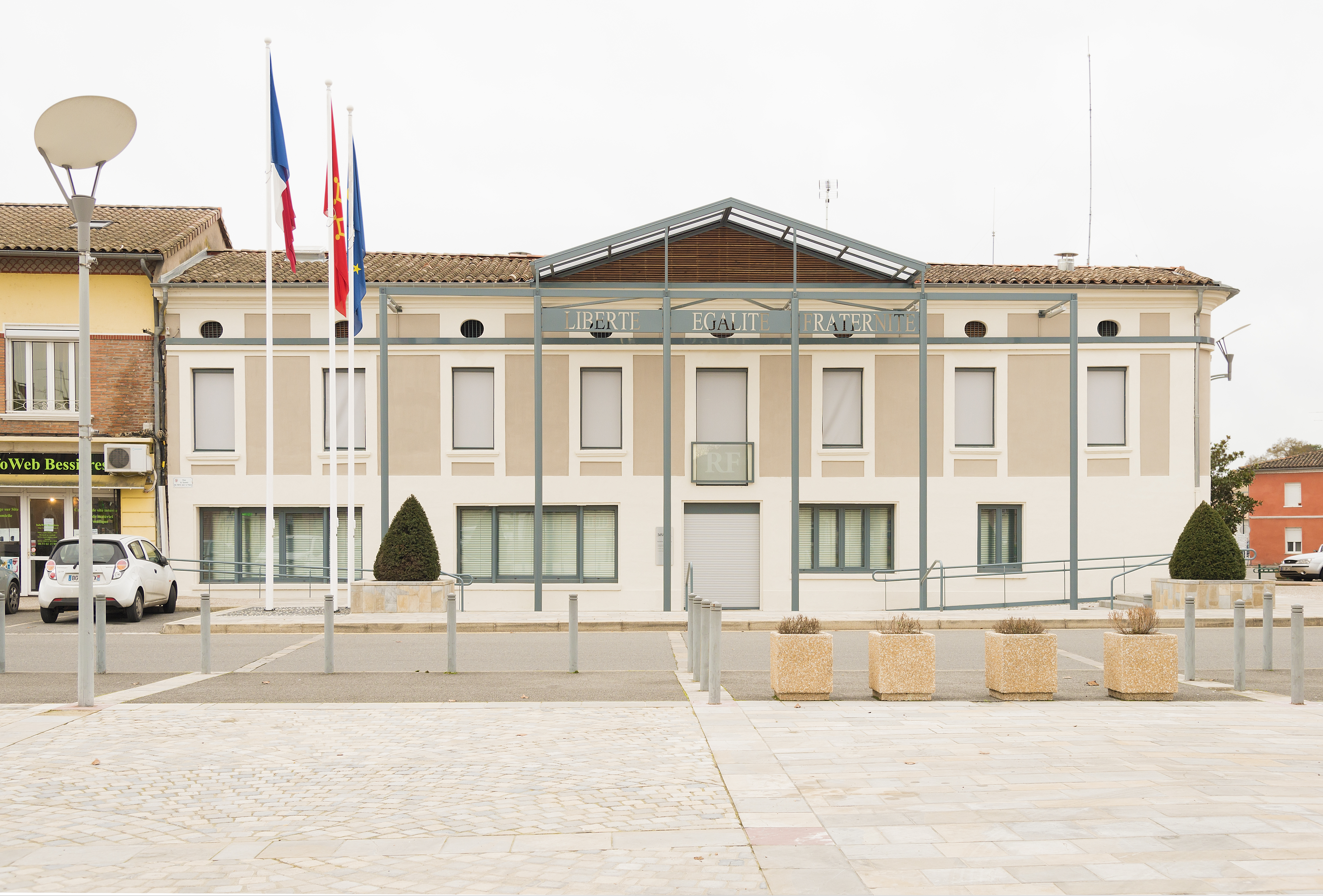
The town hall

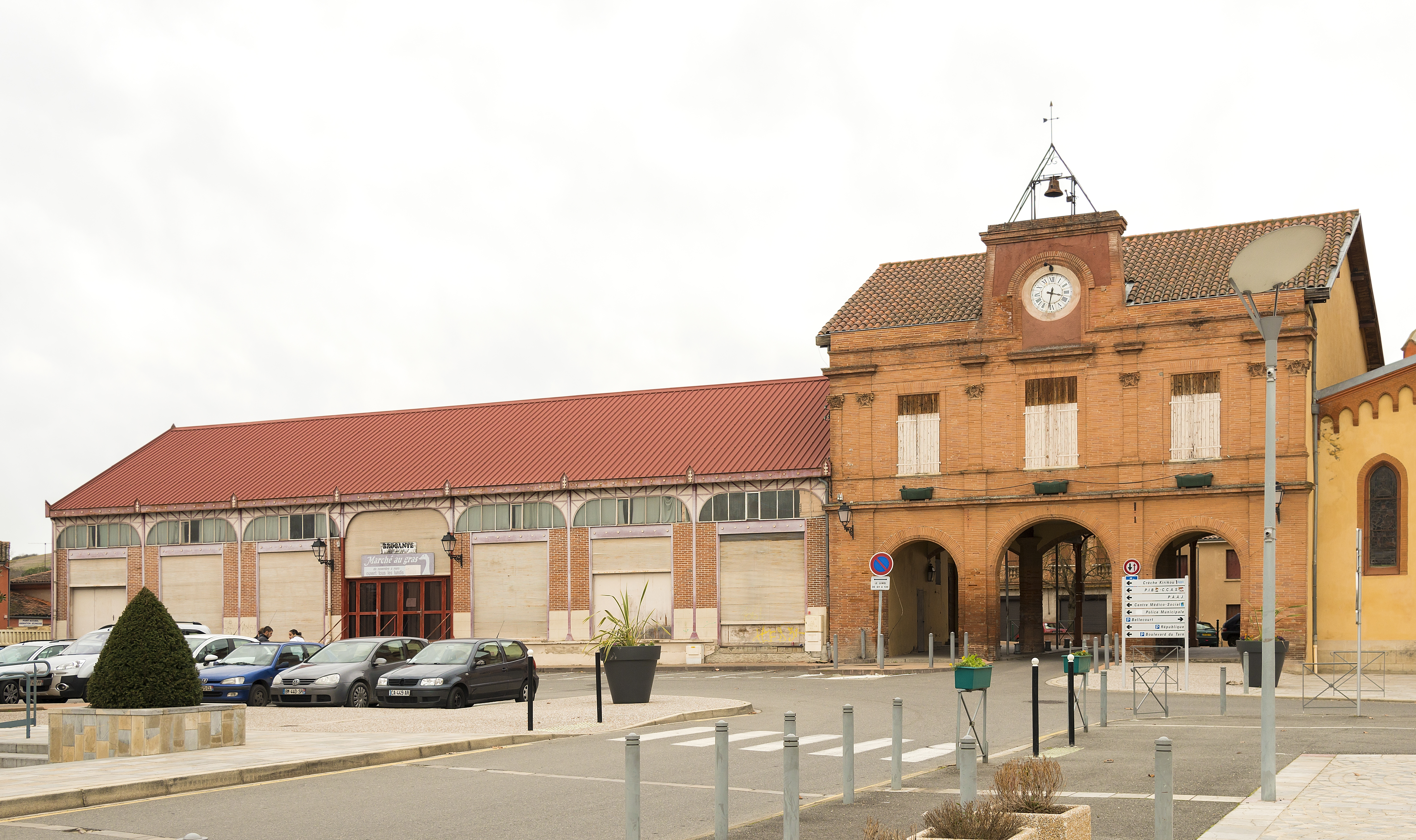
The market

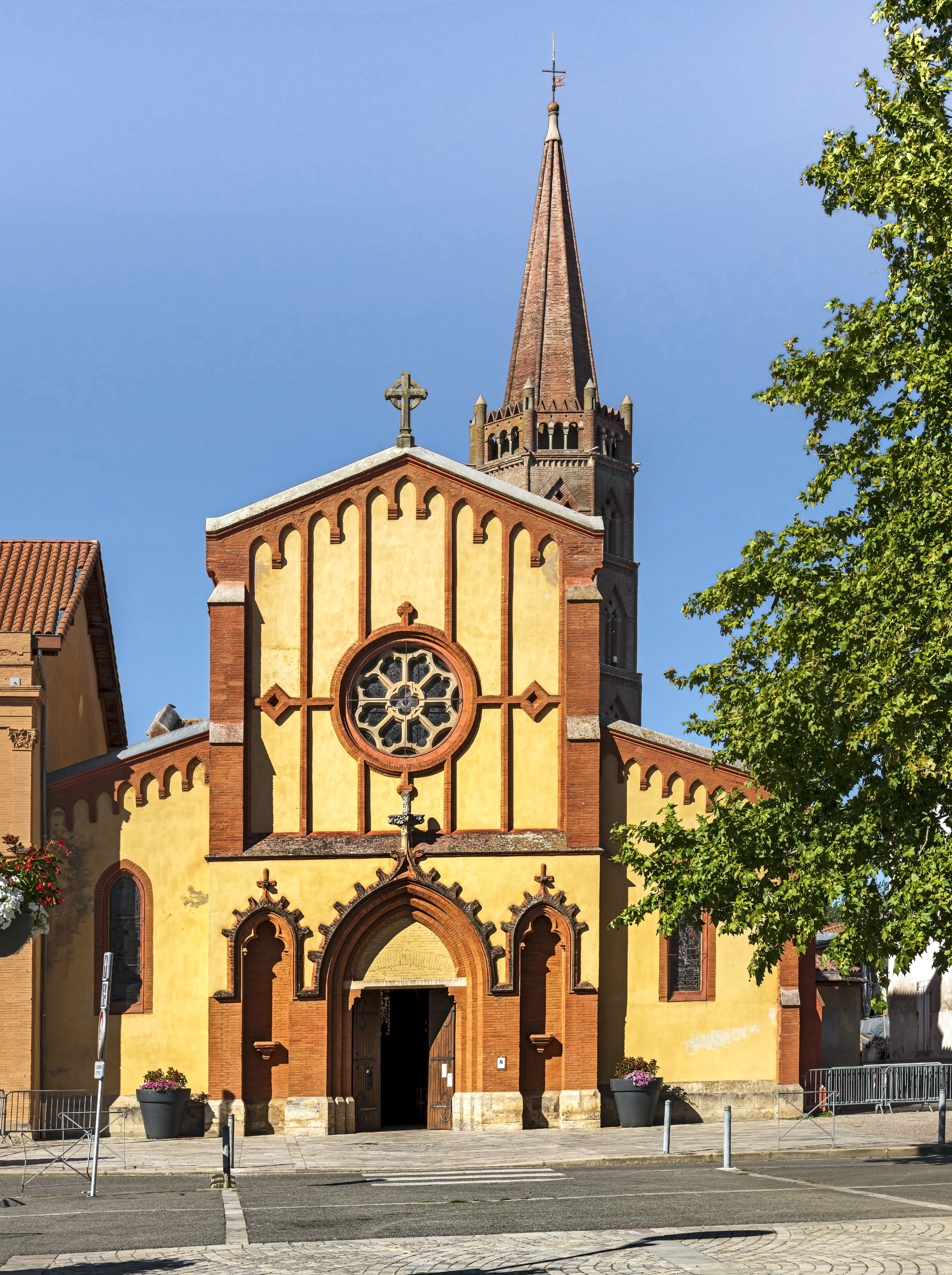
The church

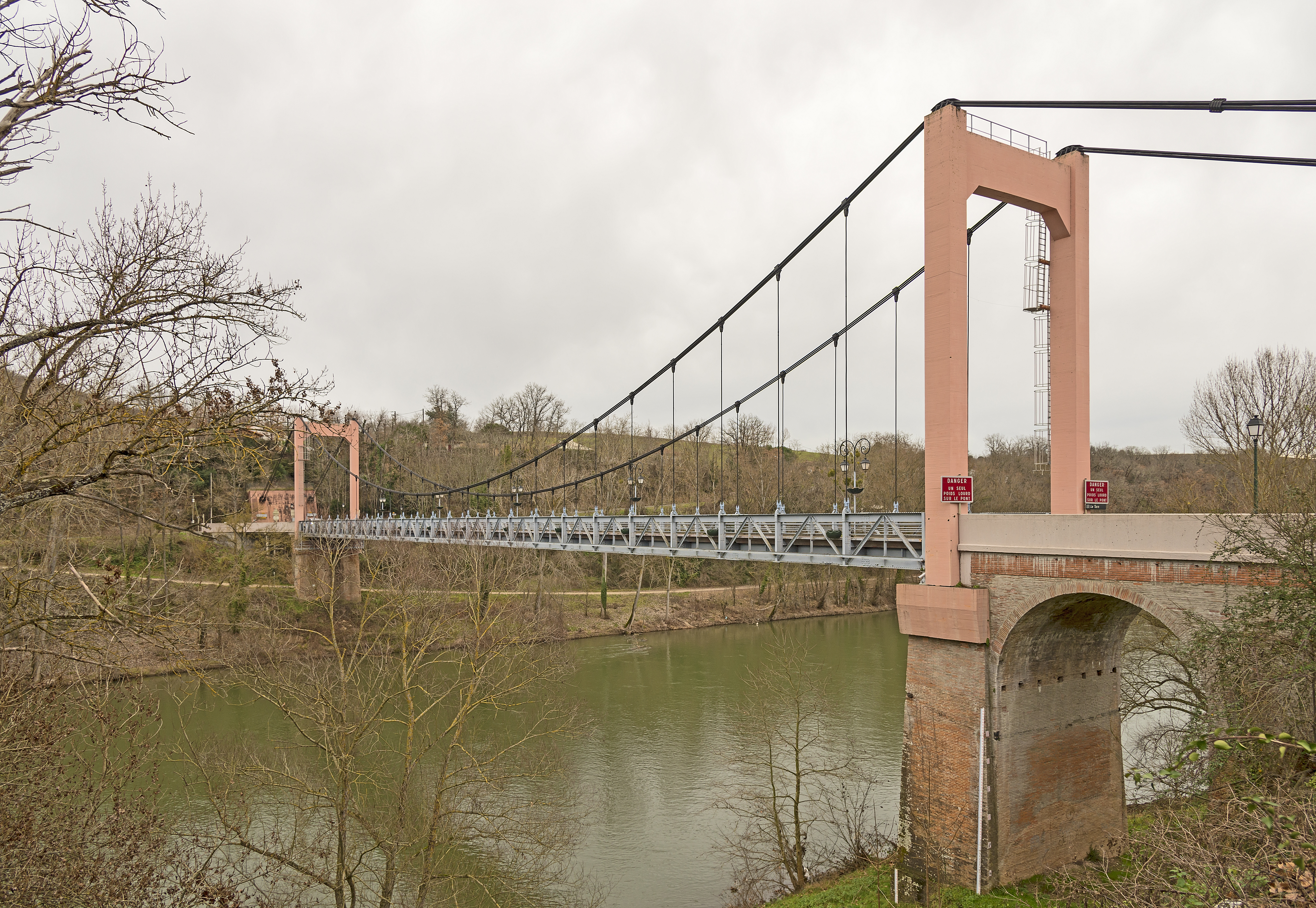
The bridge

== See also ==
- Communes of the Haute-Garonne department
