= Mathieu Criquielion =

Belgian cyclist

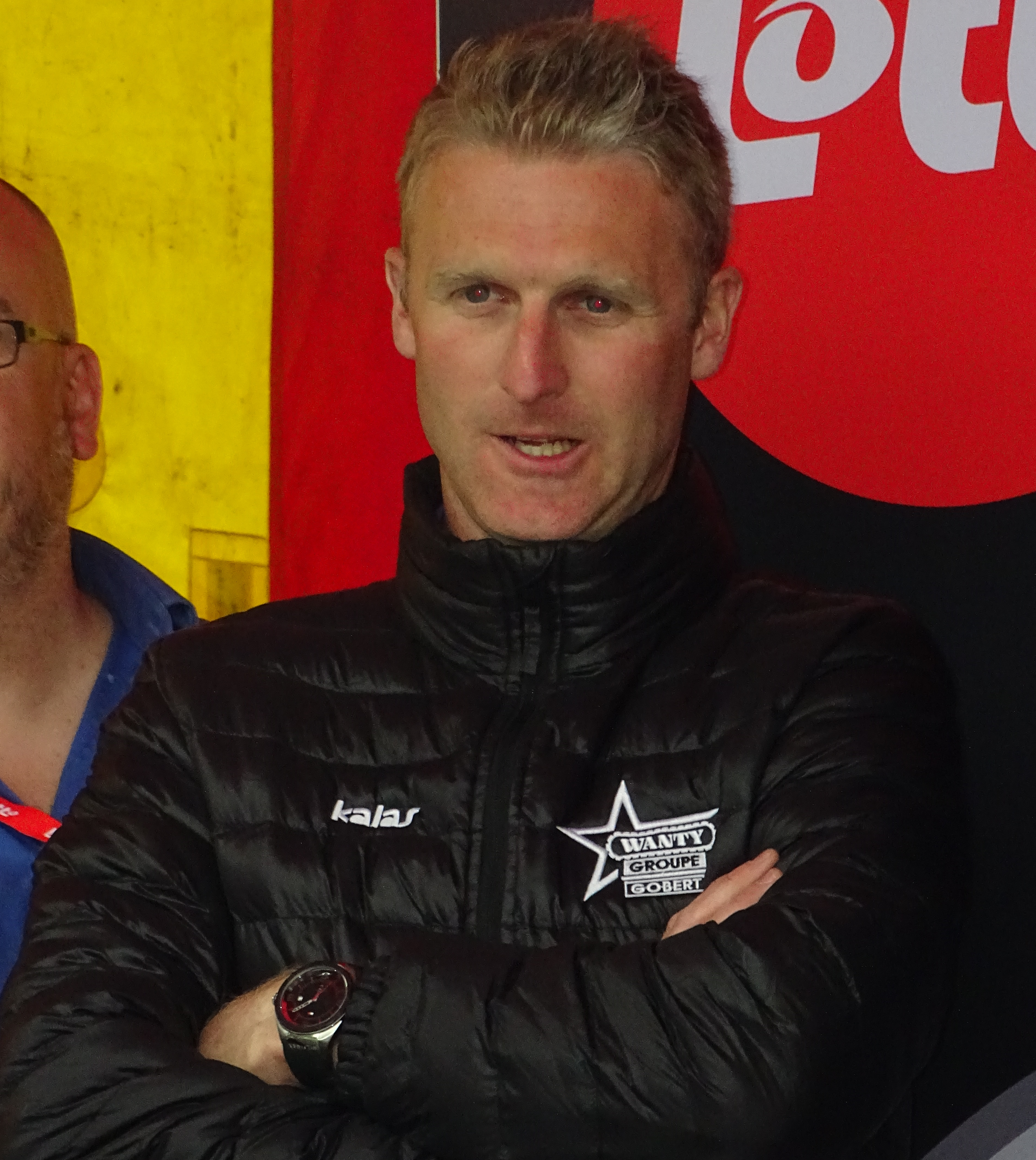
- Criquielion in 2016

Personal information
- Born: 27 April 1981 (age 45) Ath, Belgium

Cycling career
- Sport: Cycling
- Current team: Retired
- Discipline: Road
- Role: Rider

Professional teams
- 2005–2006: Landbouwkrediet–Colnago
- 2007–2008: Mitsubishi–Jartazi
- 2009: Verandas Willems

Mathieu Criquielion (born 27 April 1981 in Ath) is a Belgian former cyclist. His father Claude was also a professional cyclist.

== Major results ==
2004
1st Stage 1 Tour du Brabant Wallon
2006
10th Omloop van het Waasland
