= Jérôme Gilbert =

Belgian cyclist

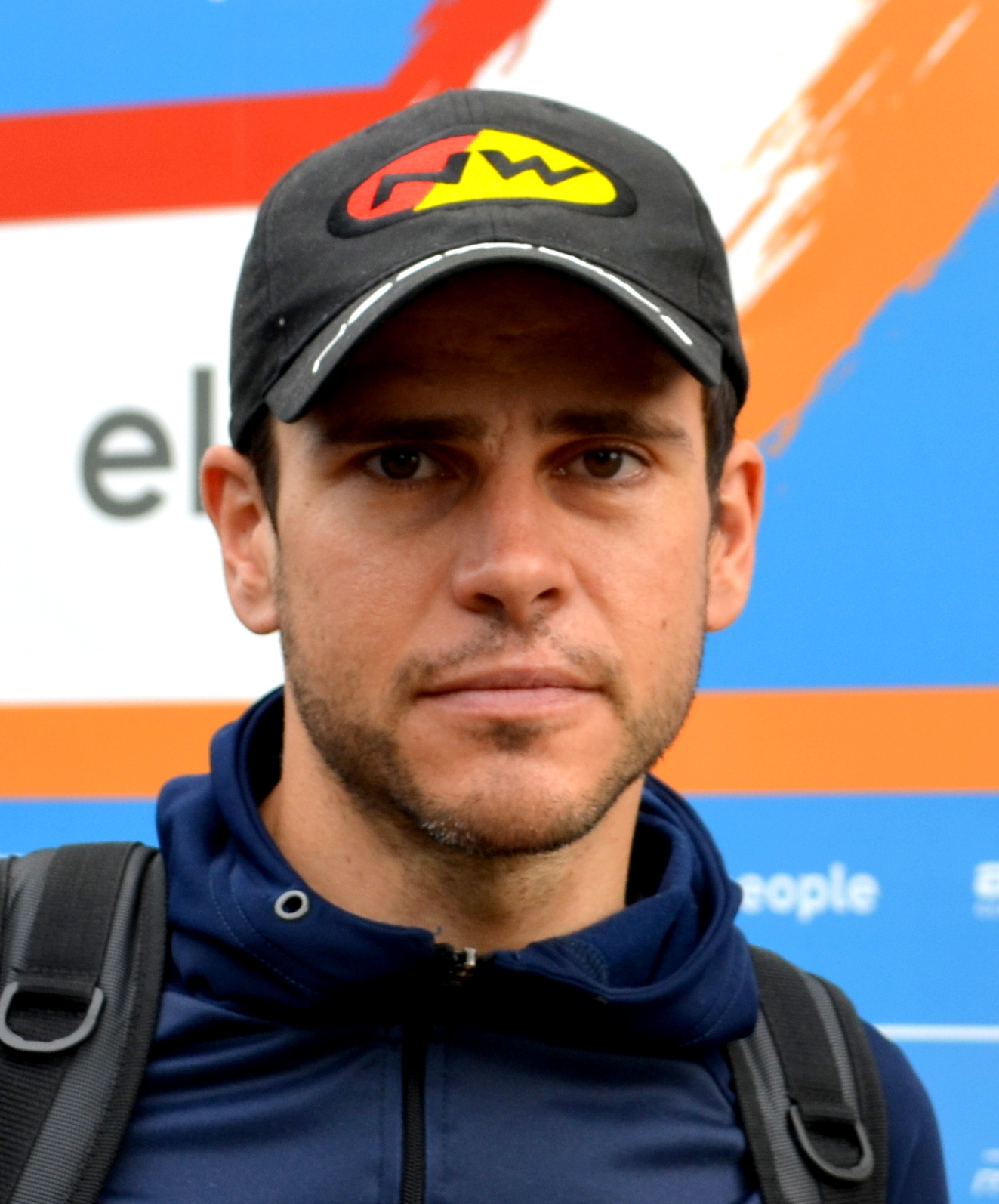
- Gilbert at the 2014 Tour de l'Ain

Personal information
- Full name: Jérôme Gilbert
- Born: 22 January 1984 (age 42) Verviers, Wallonia, Belgium

Cycling career
- Sport: Cycling
- Current team: Retired
- Discipline: Road
- Role: Rider

Professional teams
- 2012: Ville d'Alger
- 2012–2014: Accent.jobs–Willems Veranda's
- 2015: Verandas Willems

Jérôme Gilbert (born 22 January 1984) is a Belgian former racing cyclist, who competed professionally between 2012 and 2015. He is the younger brother of Philippe Gilbert.
