= Jan Soetens =

Belgian cyclist

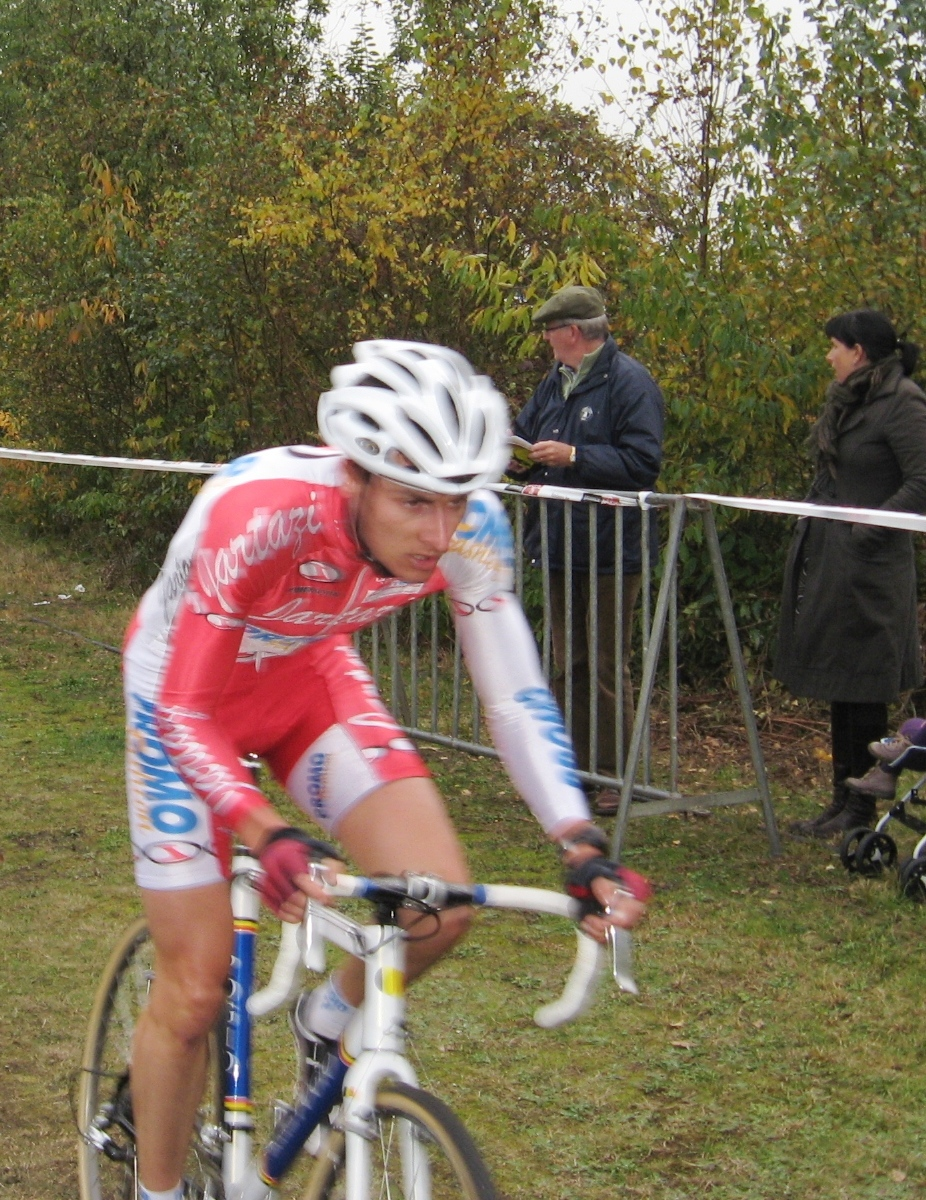

Personal information
- Born: 7 January 1984 (age 42) Geraardsbergen, East Flanders, Belgium

Cycling career
- Sport: Cycling
- Current team: Retired
- Disciplines: Cyclo-cross; Road
- Role: Rider

Professional teams
- 2006–2007: Jartazi–7Mobile
- 2007–2008: Revor Cycling Team

Jan Soetens (born 7 January 1984) is a Belgian former professional racing cyclist.

== Major results ==
2001–2002
3rd National Junior Championships
2004–2005
1st National Under-23 Championships
Under-23 Superprestige

2nd Vorselaar

2005–2006
2nd UEC European Under-23 Championships
2006–2007
1st Grand Prix Julien Cajot
2007–2008
1st National Amateur Championships
2nd Grand Prix Julien Cajot
3rd Kasteelcross Zonnebeke
2009–2010
2nd Steinmaur
