= Michael Blanchy =

Belgian cyclist

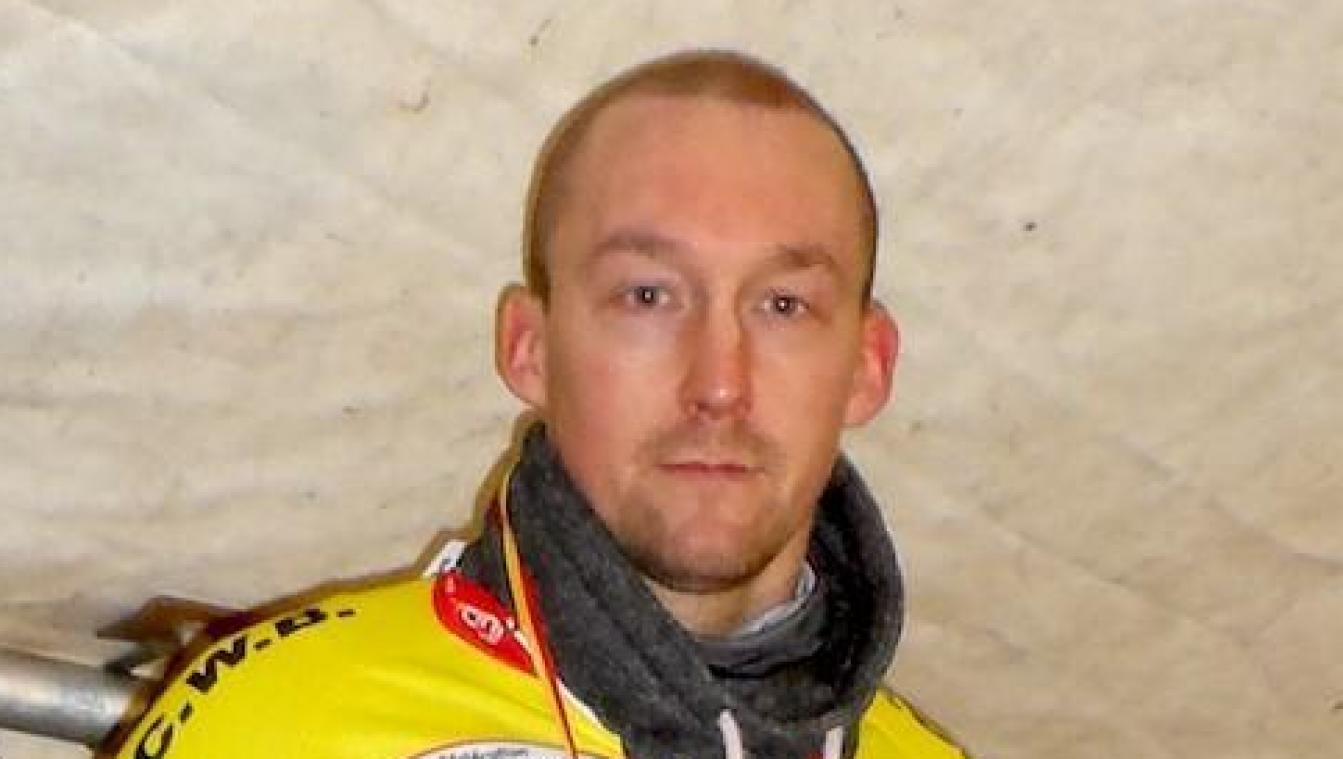

Personal information
- Born: 24 September 1981 (age 45) Verviers, Belgium

Cycling career
- Sport: Cycling
- Current team: Retired
- Discipline: Road
- Role: Rider

Amateur teams
- 2010: Multisport
- 2011: Royale Pédale Saint-Marin-Tournais
- 2014: ECW-VC Central

Professional teams
- 2004: Chocolade Jacques–Wincor Nixdorf
- 2005–2006: Jartazi Granville Team
- 2007: Babes Only–Villapark Lingemeer–Flanders
- 2008: Josan Mercedes Benz Aalst
- 2009: Revor–Jartazi

Michael Blanchy (born 24 September 1981) is a Belgian former professional road cyclist.

== Major results ==
2002
1st Internationale Wielertrofee Jong Maar Moedig
3rd Paris–Roubaix Espoirs
2003
1st Stages 2 & 3 Tour de Liège
3rd Hasselt–Spa–Hasselt
5th Grand Prix de Dourges
8th Zellik–Galmaarden
2004
4th Brussel–Ingooigem
2005
Le Triptyque des Monts et Châteaux

1st Mountains classification
1st Stage 2b

2nd Omloop van de Vlaamse Scheldeboorden
2nd Grand Prix de la ville de Pérenchies
7th Nationale Sluitingprijs
7th Grand Prix de Dourges
10th Omloop van het Waasland
2006
1st Mountains classification, Circuit Franco-Belge
6th Overall La Tropicale Amissa Bongo

1st Stage 3

8th Ronde van Noord-Holland
2007
1st Grand Prix Criquielion
3rd Internatie Reningelst
7th Vlaamse Havenpijl
8th Omloop van de Vlaamse Scheldeboorden
2009
5th Omloop van het Waasland
6th Grand Prix Herning
9th Rund um Düren
