= Romain Guillemois =

French cyclist

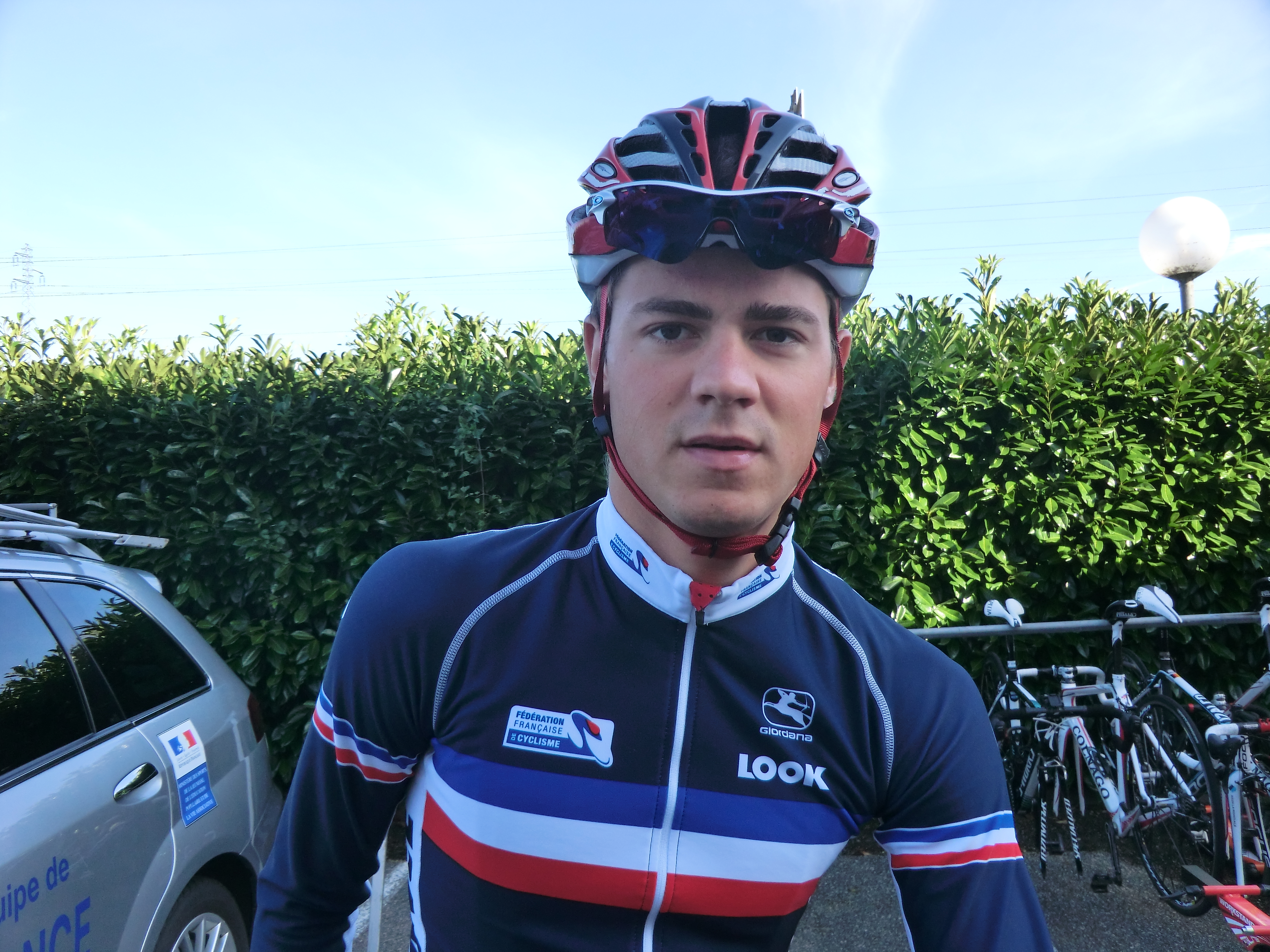
- Guillemois at the 2013 Tour de l'Ain

Personal information
- Full name: Romain Guillemois
- Born: 28 March 1991 (age 35) Marmande, France
- Height: 1.82 m (6 ft 0 in)
- Weight: 66 kg (146 lb)

Cycling career
- Sport: Cycling
- Current team: Retired
- Disciplines: Road, track
- Role: Rider

Amateur teams
- 2010–2013: Vendée U
- 2012: Team Europcar (stagiaire)
- 2013: Team Europcar (stagiaire)

Professional team
- 2014–2017: Team Europcar

Romain Guillemois (born 28 March 1991 in Marmande) is a French former cyclist, who rode professionally between 2014 and 2017 for the Direct Énergie team.

== Major results ==
2009
3rd Overall Liège-La Gleize

1st Stage 2 (TTT)

4th Road race, UCI Junior Road World Championships
2010
2nd Paris–Tours Espoirs
3rd Paris-Connerré
5th Chrono des Nations
2011
3rd Overall Boucles de la Mayenne

1st Stage 1

2012
1st Boucles Catalanes
2013
1st Stage 2 Boucles de la Mayenne
6th Overall Coupe des nations Ville Saguenay
6th Road race, Jeux de la Francophonie
7th Liège–Bastogne–Liège Espoirs
9th Paris–Tours Espoirs
10th Tour du Doubs
2015
10th Tour du Doubs
