= Lander Seynaeve =

Belgian cyclist

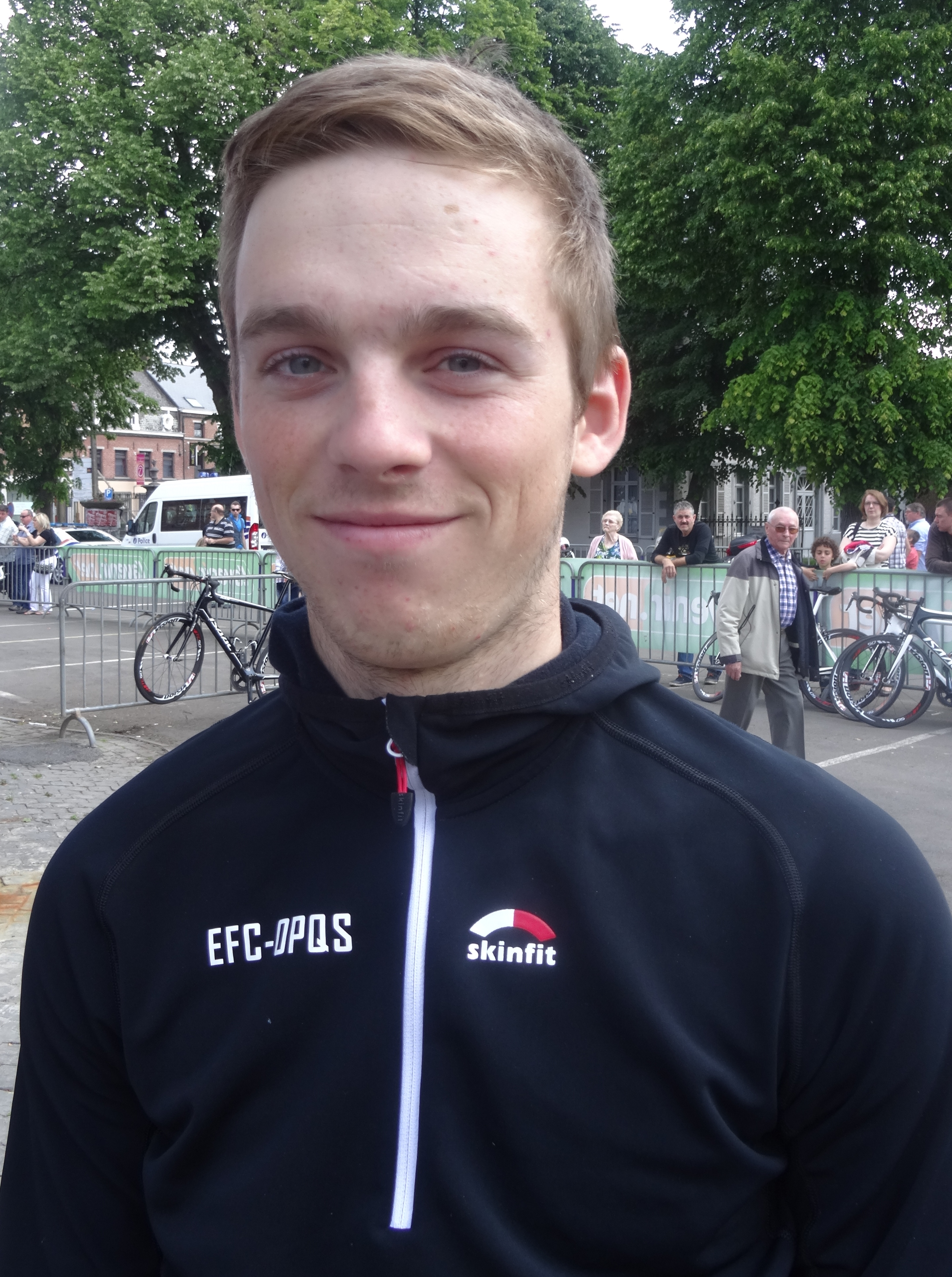
- Lander Seynaeve in 2014

Personal information
- Born: 29 May 1992 (age 34) Pontoise, France

Cycling career
- Sport: Cycling
- Current team: Intermarché–Wanty
- Discipline: Road
- Role: Rider

Amateur teams
- 2013: Accent Jobs–Wanty (stagiaire)
- 2014: Wanty–Groupe Gobert (stagiaire)

Professional team
- 2015–: Wanty–Groupe Gobert

Lander Seynaeve (born 29 May 1992) is a Belgian professional racing cyclist.
