= Internationale Wielertrofee Jong Maar Moedig =

Belgian one-day road cycling race

- Poster to the 2020 edition

Race details
- Date: June
- Region: Flemish Brabant
- Discipline: Road race
- Competition: UCI Europe Tour
- Type: Single day race
- Organiser: Wielerclub Jong Maar Moedig
- Web site: www.jongmaarmoedig.eu/IWT/2014/

History
- First edition: 1985
- Editions: 35
- Final edition: 2019
- First winner: Greg Moens (BEL)
- Most wins: Tim Declercq (BEL); Jérôme Baugnies (BEL); (2 wins)
- Final winner: Julien Van Den Brande (BEL)

The Internationale Wielertrofee Jong Maar Moedig was a professional cycling race held annually in Belgium between 1985 and 2019.

It was first held in 1985 under the name Grand Prix Jerry Blondel. In 1987 it was renamed Trophée Cycliste International Jerry Blondel. From 1998 it was known as the Internationale Wielertrofee Jong Maar Moedig. It was a part of the UCI Europe Tour from 2005 as a category 1.2 race. The race was cancelled in 2020 and 2021 due to the COVID-19 pandemic in Belgium, before being definitively cancelled later in 2021.

== Winners ==
Year	Country	Rider	Team
1985	Belgium	Greg Moens	
1986	Belgium	Rudi Van Der Haegen	
1987	Belgium	Peter De Clercq	
1988	Belgium	Marc Brock	
1989	Belgium	Alain Van Den Bossche	
1990	Belgium	Tom Desmet	
1991	Belgium	Peter Van Petegem	
1992	Belgium	Frank Corvers	
1993	Belgium	Sébastien Van Den Abeele	
1994	Belgium	Denis Francois	
1995	Belgium	Steve De Wolf	
1996	Belgium	Frédéric Moerman	
1997	Belgium	Danny In 't Ven	
1998	Netherlands	Matthé Pronk	
1999	Netherlands	Stefan van Dijk	
2000	Great Britain	Chris Newton	
2001	Belgium	Tom Boonen	
2002	Belgium	Michael Blanchy	
2003	Belgium	Hans De Meester	
2004	Belgium	Daniel Verelst	
2005	Belgium	Gert Vanderaerden	
2006	Belgium	Greg Van Avermaet	Bodysol–Win for Life–Jong Vlaanderen
2007	Belgium	Sven Nys	Rabobank
2008	Belgium	Stijn Neirynck	
2009	Belgium	Thomas De Gendt	Topsport Vlaanderen–Mercator
2010	Belgium	Sven Jodts	Beveren 2000 Quick Step
2011	Belgium	Bert Scheirlinckx	Landbouwkrediet
2012	Belgium	Tim Declercq	Topsport Vlaanderen–Mercator
2013	Belgium	Tim Declercq	Topsport Vlaanderen–Baloise
2014	Belgium	Gijs Van Hoecke	Topsport Vlaanderen–Baloise
2015	Belgium	Dimitri Claeys	Verandas Willems
2016	Belgium	Jérôme Baugnies	Wanty–Groupe Gobert
2017	Belgium	Toon Aerts	Telenet–Fidea Lions
2018	Belgium	Jérôme Baugnies	Wanty–Groupe Gobert
2019	Belgium	Julien Van Den Brande	Tarteletto–Isorex
2020– 2021	No race due to the COVID-19 pandemic in Belgium		
