= Tim De Troyer =

Belgian cyclist

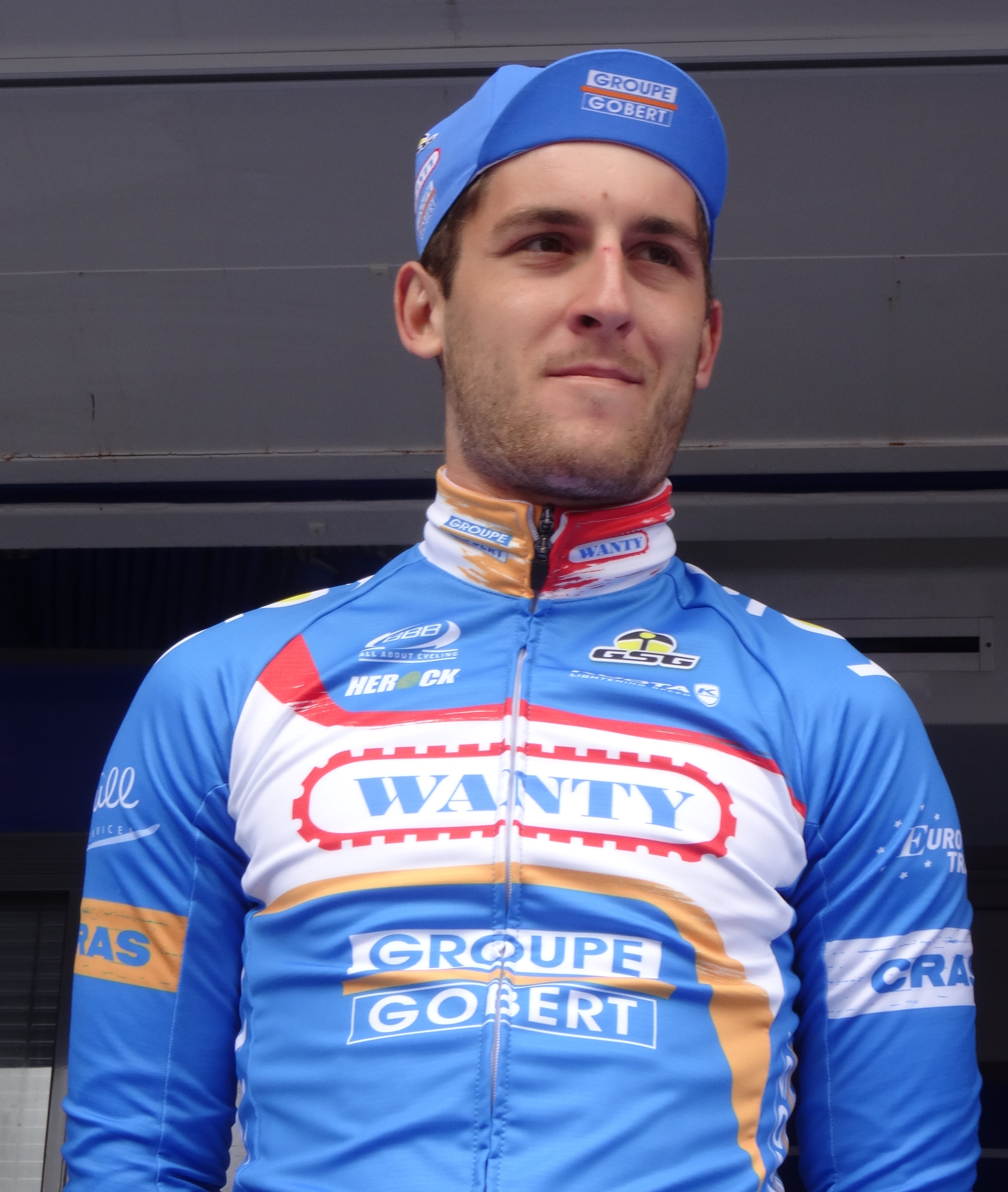
- De Troyer in 2014

Personal information
- Born: 11 August 1990 (age 36) Aalst, Belgium
- Height: 1.78 m (5 ft 10 in)
- Weight: 72 kg (159 lb; 11.3 st)

Cycling career
- Sport: Cycling
- Current team: Retired
- Discipline: Road
- Role: Rider

Amateur teams
- 2012: Ovyta–Eijssen–Acrog
- 2012: Accent.jobs–Willems Veranda's (stagiaire)
- 2017: Vetrapo

Professional teams
- 2013–2015: Accent Jobs–Wanty
- 2016: Verandas Willems

Tim De Troyer (born 11 August 1990) is a Belgian former racing cyclist. He rode at the 2014 UCI Road World Championships.

== Major results ==
2008
1st Guido Reybrouck Classic
2nd Gent–Menen
3rd Grand Prix Bati-Metallo
2011
1st Grand Prix Criquielion
2012
2nd Road race, National Under-23 Road Championships
4th De Vlaamse Pijl
8th Circuit de Wallonie
9th La Côte Picarde
2014
1st Mountains classification Three Days of De Panne
2nd Grote Prijs Stad Zottegem
2015
1st Tour du Finistère
3rd Internationale Wielertrofee Jong Maar Moedig
2016
4th Overall Le Triptyque des Monts et Châteaux
