= Grégory Habeaux =

Belgian cyclist

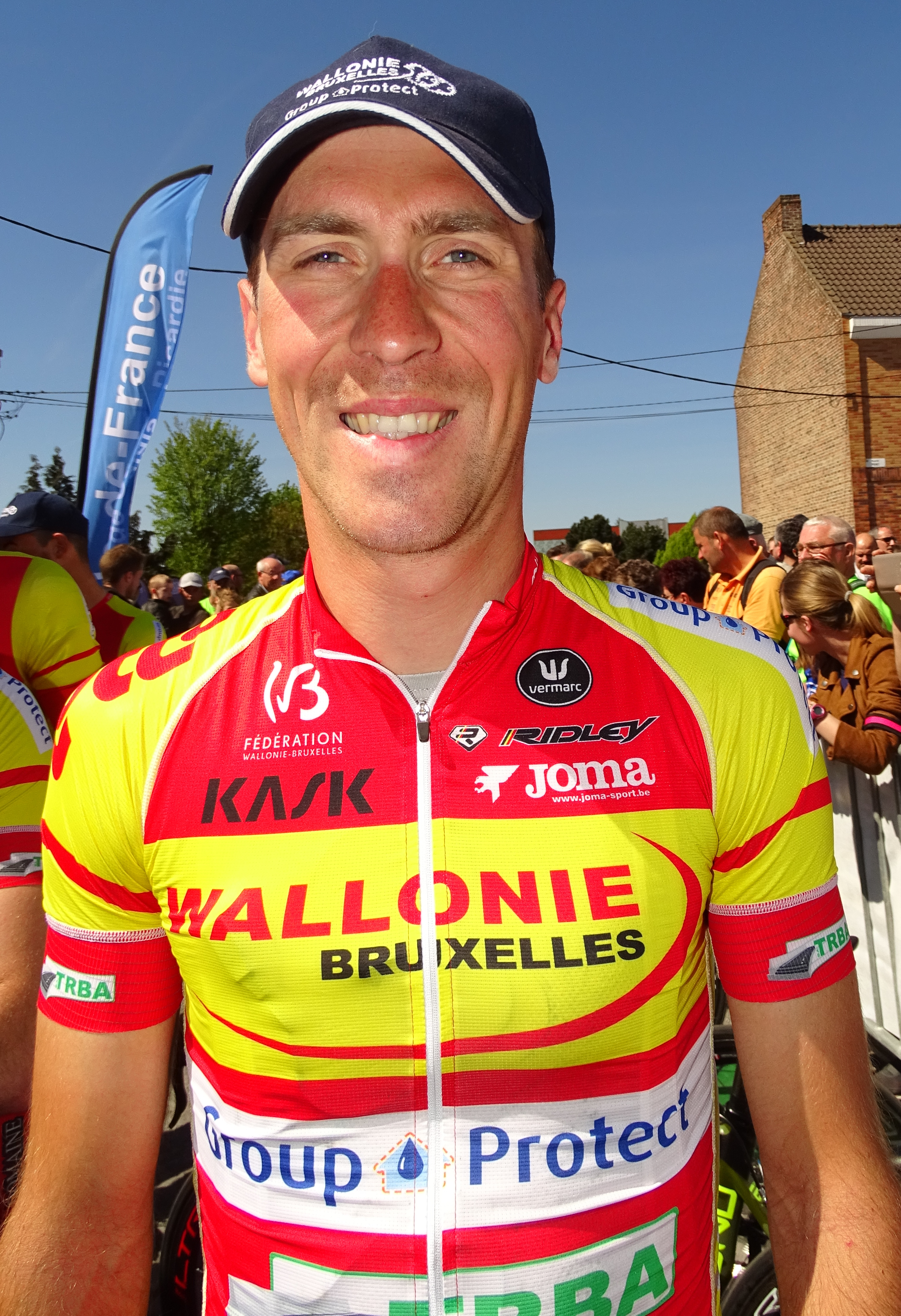
- Habeaux in 2016.

Personal information
- Full name: Grégory Habeaux
- Born: 20 October 1982 (age 43) Bassenge, Belgium
- Height: 1.83 m (6 ft 0 in)
- Weight: 68 kg (150 lb)

Cycling career
- Sport: Cycling
- Current team: Retired
- Discipline: Road
- Role: Rider

Professional teams
- 2004: Mr. Bookmaker–Palmans–Collstrop (stagiaire)
- 2005–2006: Landbouwkrediet–Colnago
- 2007: Jartazi–Promo Fashion
- 2008–2014: Willems Verandas
- 2015–2018: Wallonie-Bruxelles

Grégory Habeaux (born 20 October 1982 in Bassenge) is a Belgian former cyclist, who rode professionally between 2005 and 2018 for the Landbouwkrediet–Colnago, Jartazi–Promo Fashion, Wanty–Groupe Gobert and WB Aqua Protect Veranclassic teams before retiring due to heart issues.

== Major results ==
2004
2nd Overall Tour de Liège

1st Stage 1

5th La Côte Picarde
5th Grand Prix Criquielion
7th Memorial Van Coningsloo
2006
8th Omloop van het Waasland
2010
2nd Overall Boucles de la Mayenne
4th Overall Ronde de l'Oise
10th Polynormande
2011
1st Dwars door het Hageland
8th Antwerpse Havenpijl
2012
7th Overall Paris–Corrèze
2013
9th Memorial Marco Pantani
2014
4th Overall La Tropicale Amissa Bongo
2015
1st Mountains classification Tour de l'Eurométropole
3rd Velothon Wales
8th Overall Paris–Arras Tour
10th Polynormande
2016
3rd Internationale Wielertrofee Jong Maar Moedig
7th Circuit de Wallonie
10th Classic Loire Atlantique
2017
2nd Paris–Chauny
10th Grand Prix de la ville de Nogent-sur-Oise
