= Jérôme Baugnies =

Belgian bicycle racer

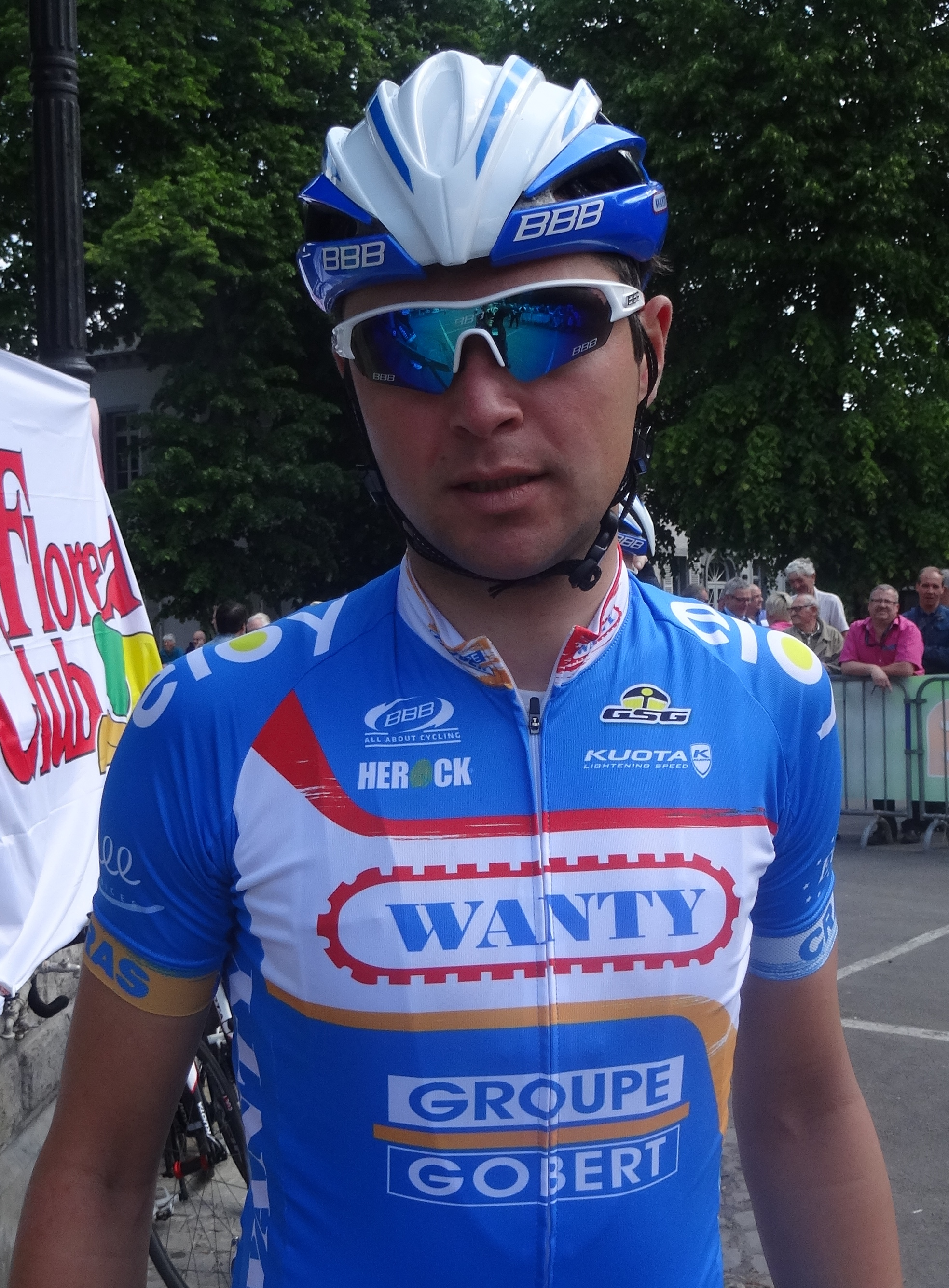
- Baugnies in 2014

Personal information
- Full name: Jérôme Baugnies
- Born: 1 April 1987 (age 39) Soignies, Belgium
- Height: 1.81 m (5 ft 11 in)
- Weight: 69 kg (152 lb; 10.9 st)

Cycling career
- Sport: Cycling
- Current team: Team Metalced
- Discipline: Road
- Role: Rider

Amateur teams
- 2013: To Win–Josan
- 2020: Decock–Van Eyck–Devos Capoen
- 2021–: Anarto–SVK

Professional teams
- 2006–2008: Bodysol–Win for Life–Jong Vlaanderen
- 2009: Cinelli–Down Under
- 2009: Josan–Isorex Mercedes–Aalst CT
- 2010–2011: Topsport Vlaanderen–Mercator
- 2012: Team NetApp
- 2014–2019: Wanty–Groupe Gobert
- 2020: Canyon dhb p/b Soreen

Jérôme Baugnies (born 1 April 1987) is a Belgian cyclist, who rides for Belgian amateur team Team Metalced.

== Major results ==
2004
7th Paris–Roubaix Juniors
2005
3rd Paris–Roubaix Juniors
2006
2nd Grand Prix Criquielion
8th Liège–Bastogne–Liège U23
2007
1st Stage 5 (TTT) Volta a Lleida
4th Paris–Tours Espoirs
2008
1st Grote Prijs Beeckman-De Caluwé
2nd Road race, National Under-23 Road Championships
2nd Ronde van Vlaanderen U23
5th Liège–Bastogne–Liège U23
5th Flèche Ardennaise
6th Romsée–Stavelot–Romsée
8th Kattekoers
2009
5th Road race, UCI Under-23 Road World Championships
5th Memorial Van Coningsloo
5th Flèche Ardennaise
2010
3rd Tre Valli Varesine
2011
2nd Eschborn-Frankfurt City Loop
8th Circuito de Getxo
2013
1st Road race, National Amateur Road Championships
1st Kattekoers
3rd Grand Prix Impanis-Van Petegem
3rd Grand Prix de la ville de Nogent-sur-Oise
4th Omloop Het Nieuwsblad Beloften
4th Memorial Van Coningsloo
5th Ronde van Limburg
6th Overall Ronde de l'Oise
10th Internationale Wielertrofee Jong Maar Moedig
2014
2nd Giro di Toscana
3rd Overall Tour des Fjords

1st Stage 1

3rd Grand Prix of Aargau Canton
3rd Eschborn-Frankfurt City Loop
4th GP Industria & Artigianato di Larciano
6th Tour de Vendée
7th Overall La Tropicale Amissa Bongo

1st Stage 2

7th Druivenkoers Overijse
9th Overall Tour of Norway
2015
1st Druivenkoers Overijse
2nd Tour du Finistère
6th Internationale Wielertrofee Jong Maar Moedig
7th Binche–Chimay–Binche
10th Grand Prix de Wallonie
2016
1st Druivenkoers Overijse
1st Internationale Wielertrofee Jong Maar Moedig
1st Sprints classification Vuelta a Andalucía
2nd Overall Rhône-Alpes Isère Tour

1st Stage 3

2nd Grand Prix Pino Cerami
3rd Grand Prix de Wallonie
10th Grand Prix d'Ouverture La Marseillaise
2017
1st Druivenkoers Overijse
3rd Grote Prijs Jean-Pierre Monseré
3rd De Kustpijl
4th Dwars door de Vlaamse Ardennen
8th Overall Tour de Luxembourg
8th Volta Limburg Classic
9th Internationale Wielertrofee Jong Maar Moedig
2018
1st Internationale Wielertrofee Jong Maar Moedig
1st Grote Prijs Stad Zottegem
2nd Grand Prix Pino Cerami
3rd Overall Rhône-Alpes Isère Tour
3rd Tacx Pro Classic
4th Dwars door het Hageland
5th Grand Prix de la Ville de Lillers
6th Volta Limburg Classic
2019
9th Grote Prijs Stad Zottegem
