= Haddou =

Haddou is a surname. Notable people with the surname include:

- Insaf Zoubida Haddou (born 1992), Algerian female volleyball player
- Ismaël Haddou (born 1996), Algerian footballer
- Jadour Haddou (born 1949), Moroccan middle-distance runner
- Madjid Ben Haddou (born 1975), Algerian footballer
- Moulay Haddou (born 1975), Algerian footballer
- Nadir Haddou (born 1983), French cyclist
- Saïd Haddou (born 1982), French cyclist
- Yassine Haddou (born 1989), French footballer
- Jamoul (born Jamila Haddou in 1999), Moroccan singer
