= 2003 Scheldeprijs =

Race details
- Dates: 16 April 2003
- Stages: 1
- Distance: 206 km (128.0 mi)
- Winning time: 4h 40' 00"

Results
| | Winner | Ludovic Capelle (BEL) | (Landbouwkrediet–Colnago) |
| | Second | Jaan Kirsipuu (EST) | (AG2R Prévoyance) |
| | Third | Steffen Radochla (GER) | (Team Bianchi) |

The 2003 Scheldeprijs was the 90th edition of the Scheldeprijs cycle race and was held on 16 April 2003. The race was won by Ludovic Capelle of the Landbouwkrediet–Colnago team.

== General classification ==
Final general classification

| Rank | Rider | Team | Time |
|---|---|---|---|
| 1 | Ludovic Capelle (BEL) | Landbouwkrediet–Colnago | 4h 40' 00" |
| 2 | Jaan Kirsipuu (EST) | AG2R Prévoyance | + 0" |
| 3 | Steffen Radochla (GER) | Team Bianchi | + 0" |
| 4 | Servais Knaven (NED) | Quick-Step–Davitamon | + 0" |
| 5 | Erik Zabel (GER) | Team Telekom | + 1" |
| 6 | Jo Planckaert (BEL) | Cofidis | + 1" |
| 7 | Allan Bo Andresen (DEN) | Team Fakta | + 1" |
| 8 | Franck Pencolé (FRA) | MBK–Oktos–Saint-Quentin | + 1" |
| 9 | Frank Høj (DEN) | Team Fakta | + 1" |
| 10 | Eric Baumann (GER) | Team Wiesenhof | + 1" |
