= Johan Le Bon =

French cyclist

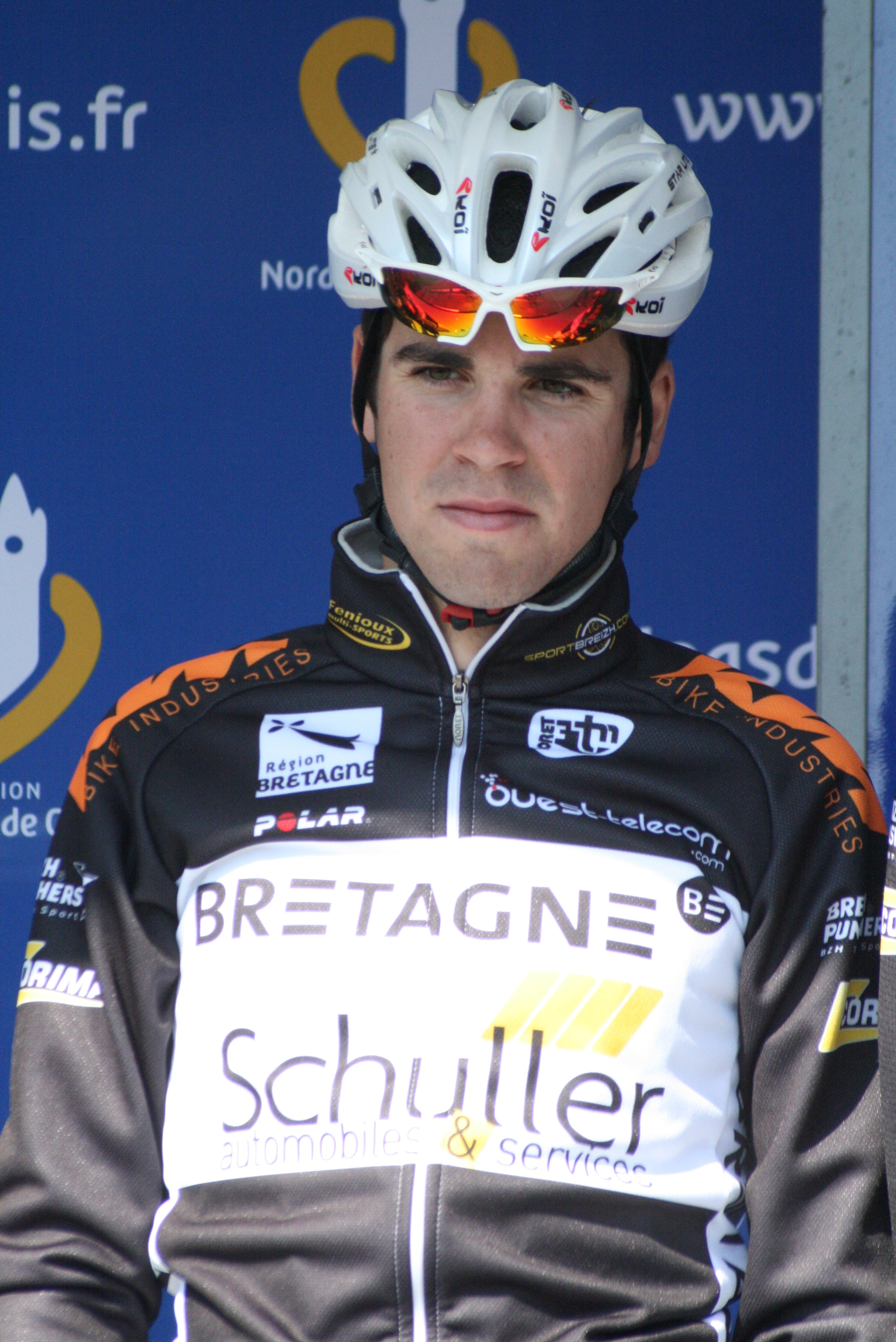
- Le Bon at the 2011 Four Days of Dunkirk

Personal information
- Full name: Johan Le Bon
- Born: 3 October 1990 (age 36) Lannion, France
- Height: 1.80 m (5 ft 11 in)
- Weight: 71 kg (157 lb)

Cycling career
- Sport: Cycling
- Current team: Dinan Sport Cycling
- Discipline: Road
- Role: Rider
- Rider type: Rouleur

Amateur teams
- 2008–2009: UC Briochine
- 2021–: Dinan Sport Cycling

Professional teams
- 2009–2012: Bretagne–Schuller
- 2013–2017: FDJ
- 2018–2020: Vital Concept
- 2021: Cambodia Cycling Academy

Johan Le Bon (born 3 October 1990) is a French road bicycle racer, who currently rides for French amateur team Dinan Sport Cycling.

== Career ==
Riding as a junior in 2008, Johan Le Bon became European Champion and World Champion within the space of a month. He also won the bronze medal at the European Time Trial Championships that year.

One year later, he joined professional cycling team Bretagne–Schuller. The 2010 edition of the Route bretonne gave him his first professional victory. He also won the third stage of the Coupe des nations Ville Saguenay, a race he won the previous year as an amateur, and the third stage of Kreiz Breizh Elites, becoming overall winner of the latter.

In both 2011 and 2012 Johan Le Bon emerged as French Under-23 Time Trial Champion.

In 2013 Le Bon moved to World Tour team FDJ. In the important three-day stage races of West Flanders and De Panne, Le Bon came in fifth and fourth, respectively. He gained his first podium spot with FDJ by finishing second in the Tro-Bro Léon. Later that year, Le Bon debuted in a Grand Tour when he took part in the Giro d'Italia.

In 2014, he participated in the Paris–Roubaix and Omloop Het Nieuwsblad cycling classics. He again took part in the Giro d'Italia, and also finished the Vuelta a España.

His biggest victory at the time came in 2015, when he won the fifth stage of the Eneco Tour.

== Major results ==
2007
1st Stage 2 Ronde des vallées
2008
UCI Juniors World Championships

1st Road race
5th Time trial

UEC European Junior Road Championships

1st Road race
3rd Time trial

1st Overall Ronde des vallées

1st Prologue

1st Overall Tour du Morbihan
1st Classique des Alpes Juniors
2nd Time trial, National Junior Road Championships
2009
1st Overall Coupe des nations Ville Saguenay
1st Étoile de Tressignaux
1st Stage 2 Classic Loire Atlantique
7th Flèche Ardennaise
2010
1st Overall Kreiz Breizh Elites

1st Stage 3

1st Route bretonne
1st Stage 3 Coupe des nations Ville Saguenay
2nd Time trial, National Under-23 Road Championships
3rd Overall Paris–Corrèze
2011
1st Time trial, National Under-23 Road Championships
1st Mountains classification Tour de Picardie
2nd Paris–Mantes-en-Yvelines
5th Overall Thüringen Rundfahrt der U23
7th Time trial, UEC European Under-23 Road Championships
2012
1st Time trial, National Under-23 Road Championships
2nd Overall Thüringen Rundfahrt der U23

1st Stage 2

4th Overall Kreiz Breizh Elites
6th Overall Tour de Normandie

1st Young rider classification

2013
2nd Tro-Bro Léon
3rd Time trial, National Road Championships
4th Overall Three Days of De Panne
5th Overall Driedaagse van West-Vlaanderen
5th Chrono des Nations
2014
3rd Overall Driedaagse van West-Vlaanderen
2015
1st Stage 5 Eneco Tour
3rd Chrono des Nations
8th Overall Tour de l'Eurométropole
9th Overall Boucles de la Mayenne

1st Prologue

9th Overall Tour du Poitou-Charentes
2016
3rd Duo Normand (with Marc Fournier)
4th Overall Boucles de la Mayenne
5th Tro-Bro Léon
5th Chrono des Nations
10th Overall Three Days of De Panne
2017
1st Prologue Tour de l'Ain
2nd Overall Boucles de la Mayenne

1st Prologue & Stage 1

2nd Polynormande
2018
9th Ronde van Drenthe
9th Chrono des Nations
10th Overall Étoile de Bessèges
2020
1st Malaysian International Classic Race
2021
1st Stage 2 Kreiz Breizh Elites
6th Overall Tour de Bretagne
2022
1st Overall Tour de Bretagne

1st Stages 2 & 7

=== Grand Tour general classification results timeline ===
Grand Tour	2013	2014	2015	2016	2017
Giro d'Italia	115	89	—	—	—
Tour de France	—	—	—	—	—
Vuelta a España	—	79	—	DNF	DNF
