= 2009 Tro-Bro Léon =

Race details
- Dates: 19 April 2009
- Stages: 1
- Distance: 202.7 km (126.0 mi)
- Winning time: 4h 56' 35"

Results
	Winner	Saïd Haddou (FRA)
	Second	Stéphane Bonsergent (FRA)
	Third	Lilian Jégou (FRA)

The 2009 Tro-Bro Léon was the 26th edition of the Tro-Bro Léon cycle race and was held on 19 April 2009. The race was won by Saïd Haddou.

== General classification ==
Final general classification

Rank	Rider	Time
1	Saïd Haddou (FRA)	4h 56' 35"
2	Stéphane Bonsergent (FRA)	+ 0"
3	Lilian Jégou (FRA)	+ 0"
4	Denys Kostyuk (UKR)	+ 0"
5	Mikel Gaztañaga (ESP)	+ 0"
6	Steven Tronet (FRA)	+ 0"
7	Steven Caethoven (BEL)	+ 0"
8	Florian Vachon (FRA)	+ 0"
9	Nadir Haddou (FRA)	+ 0"
10	Jimmy Casper (FRA)	+ 0"
