= 2004 Dwars door Vlaanderen =

Race details
- Dates: 24 March 2004
- Stages: 1
- Distance: 204 km (126.8 mi)
- Winning time: 5h 02' 30"

Results
	Winner	Ludovic Capelle (BEL)
	Second	Jaan Kirsipuu (EST)
	Third	Roger Hammond (GBR)

The 2004 Dwars door Vlaanderen was the 59th edition of the Dwars door Vlaanderen cycle race and was held on 24 March 2004. The race started in Kortrijk and finished in Waregem. The race was won by Ludovic Capelle.

== General classification ==
Final general classification

Rank	Rider	Time
1	Ludovic Capelle (BEL)	5h 02' 30"
2	Jaan Kirsipuu (EST)	+ 18"
3	Roger Hammond (GBR)	+ 18"
4	Dave Bruylandts (BEL)	+ 18"
5	Franck Pencolé (FRA)	+ 18"
6	Niko Eeckhout (BEL)	+ 24"
7	Servais Knaven (NED)	+ 24"
8	Jan Kuyckx (BEL)	+ 1' 08"
9	Antonio Cruz (USA)	+ 1' 08"
10	Jeremy Hunt (GBR)	+ 1' 08"
