= 1999 Tro-Bro Léon =

Race details
- Dates: 30 May 1999
- Stages: 1
- Distance: 177.6 km (110.4 mi)
- Winning time: 4h 13' 51"

Results
	Winner	Jean-Michel Thilloy (FRA)
	Second	Ludovic Capelle (BEL)
	Third	Ludovic Auger (FRA)

The 1999 Tro-Bro Léon was the 16th edition of the Tro-Bro Léon cycle race and was held on 30 May 1999. The race was won by Jean-Michel Thilloy.

== General classification ==
Final general classification

Rank	Rider	Time
1	Jean-Michel Thilloy (FRA)	4h 13' 51"
2	Ludovic Capelle (BEL)	+ 0"
3	Ludovic Auger (FRA)	+ 0"
4	Sébastien Hinault (FRA)	+ 0"
5	Franck Rénier (FRA)	+ 0"
6	Christian Blanchard (FRA)	+ 0"
7	Frederic Mainguenaud (FRA)	+ 0"
8	Cyrille Prise (FRA)	+ 0"
9	Jean-Patrick Nazon (FRA)	+ 0"
10	Janek Tombak (EST)	+ 0"
