= 2007 Grand Prix de Denain =

Race details
- Dates: 19 April 2007
- Stages: 1
- Distance: 199.4 km (123.9 mi)
- Winning time: 4h 18' 56"

Results
	Winner	Sébastien Chavanel (FRA)
	Second	Mark Renshaw (AUS)
	Third	Eric Baumann (GER)

The 2007 Grand Prix de Denain was the 49th edition of the Grand Prix de Denain cycle race and was held on 19 April 2007. The race was won by Sébastien Chavanel.

== General classification ==
Final general classification

Rank	Rider	Time
1	Sébastien Chavanel (FRA)	4h 18' 56"
2	Mark Renshaw (AUS)	+ 0"
3	Eric Baumann (GER)	+ 0"
4	Saïd Haddou (FRA)	+ 0"
5	Gorik Gardeyn (BEL)	+ 0"
6	Nicolas Roche (IRL)	+ 0"
7	Jérémie Galland (FRA)	+ 0"
8	Jean-Patrick Nazon (FRA)	+ 0"
9	Jimmy Engoulvent (FRA)	+ 0"
10	Steven Caethoven (BEL)	+ 0"
