= 2011 Tour de Picardie =

2010–2011 UCI Europe Tour, race 15 of 27
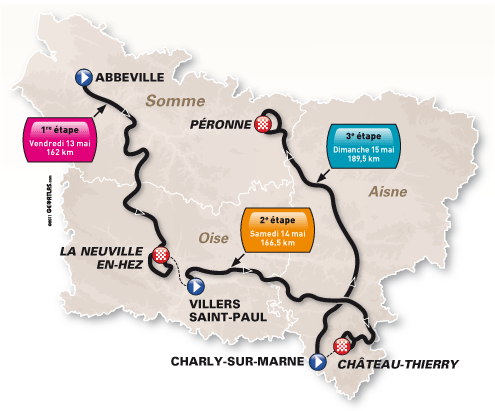
- The route of the 2011 Tour de Picardie

Race details
- Dates: 13–15 May
- Stages: 3
- Distance: 518 km (321.9 mi)
- Winning time: 12h 01' 00"

Results
Jersey awarded to the overall winner	Winner	Romain Feillu (France)	(Vacansoleil–DCM)
	Second	Kenny Dehaes (Belgium)	(Omega Pharma–Lotto)
	Third	Filippo Pozzato (Italy)	(Team Katusha)
Jersey awarded to the points classification winner	Points	Kenny Dehaes (Belgium)	(Omega Pharma–Lotto)
Jersey awarded to the mountains classification winner	Mountains	Johan Le Bon (France)	(Bretagne–Schuller)
	Team	Saur–Sojasun	

The 2011 Tour de Picardie was the 65th edition of the Tour de Picardie cycling stage race. It started on 13 May in Abbeville and ended on 15 May in Peronne and consisted of three stages.

The race was won by Team Vacansoleil-DCM rider Romain Feillu, who claimed the leader's yellow and blue jersey after a strong finish on the 3rd stage. Feillu' winning margin over runner-up Kenny De Haes of Omega Pharma-Lotto was 8 seconds, and Katusha's Filippo Pozzato completed the podium, 8 seconds down on Feillu.

In the race's other classifications, Omega-Pharma Lotto rider Kenny de Haes won the points classification's green jersey. Bretagne-Schuller rider Johan Lethe King of the Mountains classification, with Saur-Sojasun finishing at the head of the teams classification.

== Pre-race favourites ==
The winner of the 2010 Tour de Picardie, Ben Swift, was not looking to defend last year's victory because of his racing at the 2010 Tour of California, while other pre-race favourites like 3 stage winner of Tour Méditerranéen winner, Romain Feillu, as well as Kenny Dehaeswho was 5th at 2008.

== Stages ==
=== 1 ===
13 May 2011 – Abbeville to La Neuville-en-Hez, 162 km

Stage Result and General Classification after Stage

	Rider	Team	Time
1	Egidijus Juodvalkis (LIT)	Landbouwkrediet	3h 42' 29"
2	Kenny Dehaes (BEL)	Omega Pharma–Lotto	+ 1"
3	Martin Elmiger (SUI)	Ag2r–La Mondiale	+ 1"

	Rider	Team	Time
1	Egidijus Juodvalkis (LIT)	Landbouwkrediet	3h 42' 29"
2	Kenny Dehaes (BEL)	Omega Pharma–Lotto	+ 5"
3	Martin Elmiger (SUI)	Ag2r–La Mondiale	+ 7"

=== 2 ===
14 May 2011 – Villers-Saint-Paul to Château-Thierry, 166.5 km

Stage Result and General Classification after Stage

	Rider	Team	Time
1	Romain Feillu (FRA)	Vacansoleil–DCM	3h 45' 26"
2	Saïd Haddou (FRA)	Team Europcar	st"
3	Mathieu Drujon (FRA)	BigMat–Auber 93	st"

	Rider	Team	Time
1	Egidijus Juodvalkis (LIT)	Landbouwkrediet	3h 42' 29"
2	Romain Feillu (FRA)	Vacansoleil–DCM	+ 1"
3	Kenny Dehaes (BEL)	Omega Pharma–Lotto	+ 5"

=== 3 ===
15 May 2011 – Charly-sur-Marne to Péronne, 189.5 km

Stage Result and General Classification after Stage

	Rider	Team	Time
1	Jimmy Casper (FRA)	Saur–Sojasun	4h 32' 58"
2	Filippo Pozzato (ITA)	Team Katusha	st"
3	Romain Feillu (FRA)	Vacansoleil–DCM	st"

	Rider	Team	Time
1	Romain Feillu (FRA)	Vacansoleil–DCM	12h 01' 00"
2	Kenny Dehaes (BEL)	Omega Pharma–Lotto	+ 8"
3	Filippo Pozzato (ITA)	Team Katusha	+ 8"

== Classification leadership ==
Stage	Winner	General classification	Mountains classification	Points classification	Team Classification
1	Egidijus Juodvalkis	Egidijus Juodvalkis	Johan Le Bon	Egidijus Juodvalkis	Landbouwkrediet
2	Romain Feillu	Egidijus Juodvalkis	Johan Le Bon	Kenny Dehaes	BigMat–Auber 93
3	Jimmy Casper	Romain Feillu	Johan Le Bon	Kenny Dehaes	Saur–Sojasun
Final		Romain Feillu	Johan Le Bon	Kenny Dehaes	Saur–Sojasun

== Winners ==
=== General classification ===
	Rider	Team	Time
1	Romain Feillu (FRA)	Vacansoleil–DCM	12h 01' 00"
2	Kenny Dehaes (BEL)	Omega Pharma–Lotto	+ 8"
3	Filippo Pozzato (ITA)	Team Katusha	+ 8"

=== Points ===
	Rider	Team	Time
1	Kenny Dehaes (BEL)	Omega Pharma–Lotto	46 points
2	Romain Feillu (FRA)	Vacansoleil–DCM	45 points
3	Filippo Pozzato (ITA)	Team Katusha	41 points

=== Mountains ===
	Rider	Team	Time
1	Johan Le Bon (FRA)	Bretagne–Schuller	20 points
2	Mathieu Halleguen (FRA)	Bretagne–Schuller	9 points
3	Benoit Daeninck (FRA)	Roubaix–Lille Métropole	8 points

=== Team ===
Pos.	Team	Time
1	Saur–Sojasun	36h 03' 42"
2	BigMat–Auber 93	+ 7"
3	Bretagne–Schuller	+ 7"

== See also ==
- https://web.archive.org/web/20110623140759/http://www.letour.fr/fr/homepage_courseTDO.html
