= 2007 Tro-Bro Léon =

Race details
- Dates: 22 April 2007
- Stages: 1
- Distance: 186.6 km (115.9 mi)
- Winning time: 4h 44' 28"

Results
	Winner	Saïd Haddou (FRA)
	Second	Sébastien Chavanel (FRA)
	Third	Christophe Diguet (FRA)

The 2007 Tro-Bro Léon was the 24th edition of the Tro-Bro Léon cycle race and was held on 22 April 2007. The race was won by Saïd Haddou.

== General classification ==
Final general classification

Rank	Rider	Time
1	Saïd Haddou (FRA)	4h 44' 28"
2	Sébastien Chavanel (FRA)	+ 0"
3	Christophe Diguet (FRA)	+ 0"
4	Stéphane Bonsergent (FRA)	+ 0"
5	Lloyd Mondory (FRA)	+ 0"
6	Takashi Miyazawa (JPN)	+ 0"
7	Rony Martias (FRA)	+ 0"
8	Pierre Rolland (FRA)	+ 0"
9	Nicolas Roche (IRL)	+ 0"
10	Guillaume Levarlet (FRA)	+ 0"
