= 2013 Three Days of De Panne =

2013 UCI Europe Tour

Race details
- Dates: 26–28 March
- Stages: 4
- Distance: 528.45 km (328.36 mi)

Results
Jersey awarded to the overall winner	Winner	Sylvain Chavanel (FRA)	(Omega Pharma–Quick-Step)
	Second	Alexander Kristoff (NOR)	(Team Katusha)
	Third	Niki Terpstra (NED)	(Omega Pharma–Quick-Step)
Jersey awarded to the points classification winner	Points	Alexander Kristoff (NOR)	(Team Katusha)
Jersey awarded to the mountains classification winner	Mountains	Marco Haller (AUT)	(Team Katusha)
Jersey awarded to the sprints classification winner	Sprints	Koen Barbé (BEL)	(Crelan–Euphony)
	Team	Omega Pharma–Quick-Step	

The 2013 Three Days of De Panne (Dutch: 2013 KBC Driedaagse van De Panne-Koksijde) was the 37th edition of the Three Days of De Panne, an annual bicycle stage race. Taking part in and around the De Panne region of West Flanders, it began in Middelkerke on 26 March and was finished in De Panne two days later. The 528.45 km (328.36 mi) long race contained four stages, with two held on the final day. It was part of the 2013 UCI Europe Tour and was rated as a 2.HC event.

== Teams ==
23 teams were invited to participate in the tour: 10 UCI ProTeams, 11 UCI Professional Continental Teams and 2 UCI Continental Teams.

UCI ProTeams
- Omega Pharma–Quick-Step
- Cannondale
- Lotto–Belisol
- Orica–GreenEDGE
- Astana
- Vacansoleil–DCM
- Argos–Shimano
- Team Katusha
- Lampre–Merida
- FDJ
UCI Professional Continental Teams
- Team Europcar
- Vini Fantini–Selle Italia
- Bardiani Valvole–CSF Inox
- Champion System
- Topsport Vlaanderen–Baloise
- NetApp–Endura
- UnitedHealthcare
- Crelan–Euphony
- RusVelo
- MTN–Qhubeka
- Accent Jobs–Wanty
UCI Continental Teams
- Team 3M
- An Post–Chain Reaction

== Race overview ==
Stage	Date	Course	Distance	Type	Winner
1	26 March	Middelkerke to Zottegem	197.3 km (122.6 mi)	Intermediate stage	Peter Sagan (SVK)
2	27 March	Oudenaarde to Koksijde	208.9 km (129.8 mi)	Flat stage	Mark Cavendish (GBR)
3a	28 March	De Panne to De Panne	109.7 km (68.2 mi)	Flat stage	Alexander Kristoff (NOR)
3b	28 March	De Panne to Koksijde to De Panne	14.75 km (9.2 mi)	Individual time trial	Sylvain Chavanel (FRA)

== Stages ==
=== Stage 1 ===
26 March 2013 – Middelkerke to Zottegem, 197.3 km (122.6 mi)

Stage 1 Result
	Rider	Team	Time
1	Peter Sagan (SVK)	Cannondale	5h 00' 27"
2	Arnaud Démare (FRA)	FDJ	s.t.
3	Alexander Kristoff (NOR)	Team Katusha	s.t.
4	Sylvain Chavanel (FRA)	Omega Pharma–Quick-Step	s.t.
5	Oscar Gatto (ITA)	Vini Fantini–Selle Italia	s.t.
6	Niki Terpstra (NED)	Omega Pharma–Quick-Step	s.t.
7	Maxime Vantomme (BEL)	Crelan–Euphony	s.t.
8	Jérôme Cousin (FRA)	Team Europcar	s.t.
9	Davide Cimolai (ITA)	Lampre–Merida	s.t.
10	Johan Le Bon (FRA)	FDJ	s.t.

General Classification after Stage 1
	Rider	Team	Time
1	Peter Sagan (SVK)	Cannondale	5h 00' 17"
2	Arnaud Démare (FRA)	FDJ	+ 4"
3	Alexander Kristoff (NOR)	Team Katusha	+ 6"
4	Sylvain Chavanel (FRA)	Omega Pharma–Quick-Step	+ 10"
5	Oscar Gatto (ITA)	Vini Fantini–Selle Italia	+ 10"
6	Niki Terpstra (NED)	Omega Pharma–Quick-Step	+ 10"
7	Maxime Vantomme (BEL)	Crelan–Euphony	+ 10"
8	Jérôme Cousin (FRA)	Team Europcar	+ 10"
9	Davide Cimolai (ITA)	Lampre–Merida	+ 10"
10	Johan Le Bon (FRA)	FDJ	+ 10"

=== Stage 2 ===
27 March 2013 – Oudenaarde to Koksijde, 208.9 km (129.8 mi)

Stage 2 Result
	Rider	Team	Time
1	Mark Cavendish (GBR)	Omega Pharma–Quick-Step	4h 46' 57"
2	Elia Viviani (ITA)	Cannondale	s.t.
3	Francesco Chicchi (ITA)	Vini Fantini–Selle Italia	s.t.
4	Arnaud Démare (FRA)	FDJ	s.t.
5	Alexander Kristoff (NOR)	Team Katusha	s.t.
6	Baptiste Planckaert (BEL)	Crelan–Euphony	s.t.
7	Romain Feillu (FRA)	Vacansoleil–DCM	s.t.
8	Blaž Jarc (SLO)	NetApp–Endura	s.t.
9	Nikias Arndt (GER)	Argos–Shimano	s.t.
10	Tom Van Asbroeck (BEL)	Topsport Vlaanderen–Baloise	s.t.

General Classification after Stage 2
	Rider	Team	Time
1	Arnaud Démare (FRA)	FDJ	9h 47' 18"
2	Alexander Kristoff (NOR)	Team Katusha	+ 2"
3	Mark Cavendish (GBR)	Omega Pharma–Quick-Step	+ 5"
4	Sylvain Chavanel (FRA)	Omega Pharma–Quick-Step	+ 6"
5	Maxime Vantomme (BEL)	Crelan–Euphony	+ 6"
6	Niki Terpstra (NED)	Omega Pharma–Quick-Step	+ 6"
7	Davide Cimolai (ITA)	Lampre–Merida	+ 11"
8	Johan Le Bon (FRA)	FDJ	+ 14"
9	Oscar Gatto (ITA)	Vini Fantini–Selle Italia	+ 14"
10	André Greipel (GER)	Lotto–Belisol	+ 15"

=== Stage 3a ===
28 March 2013 – De Panne to De Panne, 109.7 km (68.2 mi)

Stage 3a Result
	Rider	Team	Time
1	Alexander Kristoff (NOR)	Team Katusha	2h 29' 02"
2	Sacha Modolo (ITA)	Bardiani Valvole–CSF Inox	s.t.
3	Elia Viviani (ITA)	Cannondale	s.t.
4	Sonny Colbrelli (ITA)	Bardiani Valvole–CSF Inox	s.t.
5	Baptiste Planckaert (BEL)	Crelan–Euphony	s.t.
6	Davide Cimolai (ITA)	Lampre–Merida	s.t.
7	Kenny Dehaes (BEL)	Lotto–Belisol	s.t.
8	Mark Cavendish (GBR)	Omega Pharma–Quick-Step	s.t.
9	Kenny van Hummel (NED)	Vacansoleil–DCM	s.t.
10	Alessandro Bazzana (ITA)	UnitedHealthcare	s.t.

General Classification after Stage 3a
	Rider	Team	Time
1	Alexander Kristoff (NOR)	Team Katusha	12h 16' 16"
2	Arnaud Démare (FRA)	FDJ	+ 4"
3	Mark Cavendish (GBR)	Omega Pharma–Quick-Step	+ 9"
4	Sylvain Chavanel (FRA)	Omega Pharma–Quick-Step	+ 10"
5	Maxime Vantomme (BEL)	Crelan–Euphony	+ 10"
6	Niki Terpstra (NED)	Omega Pharma–Quick-Step	+ 10"
7	Davide Cimolai (ITA)	Lampre–Merida	+ 15"
8	Johan Le Bon (FRA)	FDJ	+ 18"
9	Oscar Gatto (ITA)	Vini Fantini–Selle Italia	+ 18"
10	Baptiste Planckaert (BEL)	Crelan–Euphony	+ 19"

=== Stage 3b ===
28 March 2013 – De Panne to Koksijde to De Panne, 14.75 km (9.17 mi) individual time trial (ITT)

Stage 3b Result
	Rider	Team	Time
1	Sylvain Chavanel (FRA)	Omega Pharma–Quick-Step	18' 03"
2	Anton Vorobyev (RUS)	Team Katusha	+ 19"
3	Lieuwe Westra (NED)	Vacansoleil–DCM	+ 21"
4	Johan Le Bon (FRA)	FDJ	+ 24"
5	Niki Terpstra (NED)	Omega Pharma–Quick-Step	+ 31"
6	Alexander Kristoff (NOR)	Team Katusha	+ 32"
7	Tom Dumoulin (NED)	Argos–Shimano	+ 34"
8	Jens Mouris (NED)	Orica–GreenEDGE	+ 35"
9	Luke Durbridge (AUS)	Orica–GreenEDGE	+ 35"
10	Guillaume Van Keirsbulck (BEL)	Omega Pharma–Quick-Step	+ 41"

Final General Classification
	Rider	Team	Time
1	Sylvain Chavanel (FRA)	Omega Pharma–Quick-Step	12h 34' 28"
2	Alexander Kristoff (NOR)	Team Katusha	+ 22"
3	Niki Terpstra (NED)	Omega Pharma–Quick-Step	+ 31"
4	Johan Le Bon (FRA)	FDJ	+ 32"
5	Lieuwe Westra (NED)	Vacansoleil–DCM	+ 38"
6	Tom Dumoulin (NED)	Argos–Shimano	+ 51"
7	Luke Durbridge (AUS)	Orica–GreenEDGE	+ 52"
8	David Boucher (FRA)	FDJ	+ 57"
9	Guillaume Van Keirsbulck (BEL)	Omega Pharma–Quick-Step	+ 58"
10	Mark Cavendish (GBR)	Omega Pharma–Quick-Step	+ 1' 06"

== Classification leadership ==
Stage	Winner	General classification	Points classification	Mountains classification	Sprints classification	Team classification	Combativity award
1	Peter Sagan	Peter Sagan	Peter Sagan	Marco Haller	Koen Barbé	FDJ	Marco Haller
2	Mark Cavendish	Arnaud Démare	Arnaud Démare	Marco Haller	Koen Barbé	Omega Pharma–Quick-Step	Mattia Pozzo
3a	Alexander Kristoff	Alexander Kristoff	Alexander Kristoff	Marco Haller	Koen Barbé	Omega Pharma–Quick-Step	Niko Eeckhout
3b	Sylvain Chavanel	Sylvain Chavanel	Alexander Kristoff	Marco Haller	Koen Barbé	Omega Pharma–Quick-Step	no award
Final		Sylvain Chavanel	Alexander Kristoff	Marco Haller	Koen Barbé	Omega Pharma–Quick-Step	Koen Barbé

Notes

- In stage 2, Arnaud Démare, who was second in the points classification, wore the green jersey, because Peter Sagan (in first place) wore the white jersey as leader of the general classification during that stage.
- In stage 3a, Alexander Kristoff, who was second in the points classification, wore the green jersey, because Arnaud Démare (in first place) wore the white jersey as leader of the general classification during that stage.
