= Nazon =

Nazon is a surname. Notable people with the surname include:

- Damien Nazon (born 1974), French racing cyclist
- Duckens Nazon (born 1994), French-born Haitian footballer
- Jean-Patrick Nazon (born 1977), French road bicycle racer, brother of Damien
