= David Boucher (cyclist) =

Belgian professional road cyclist

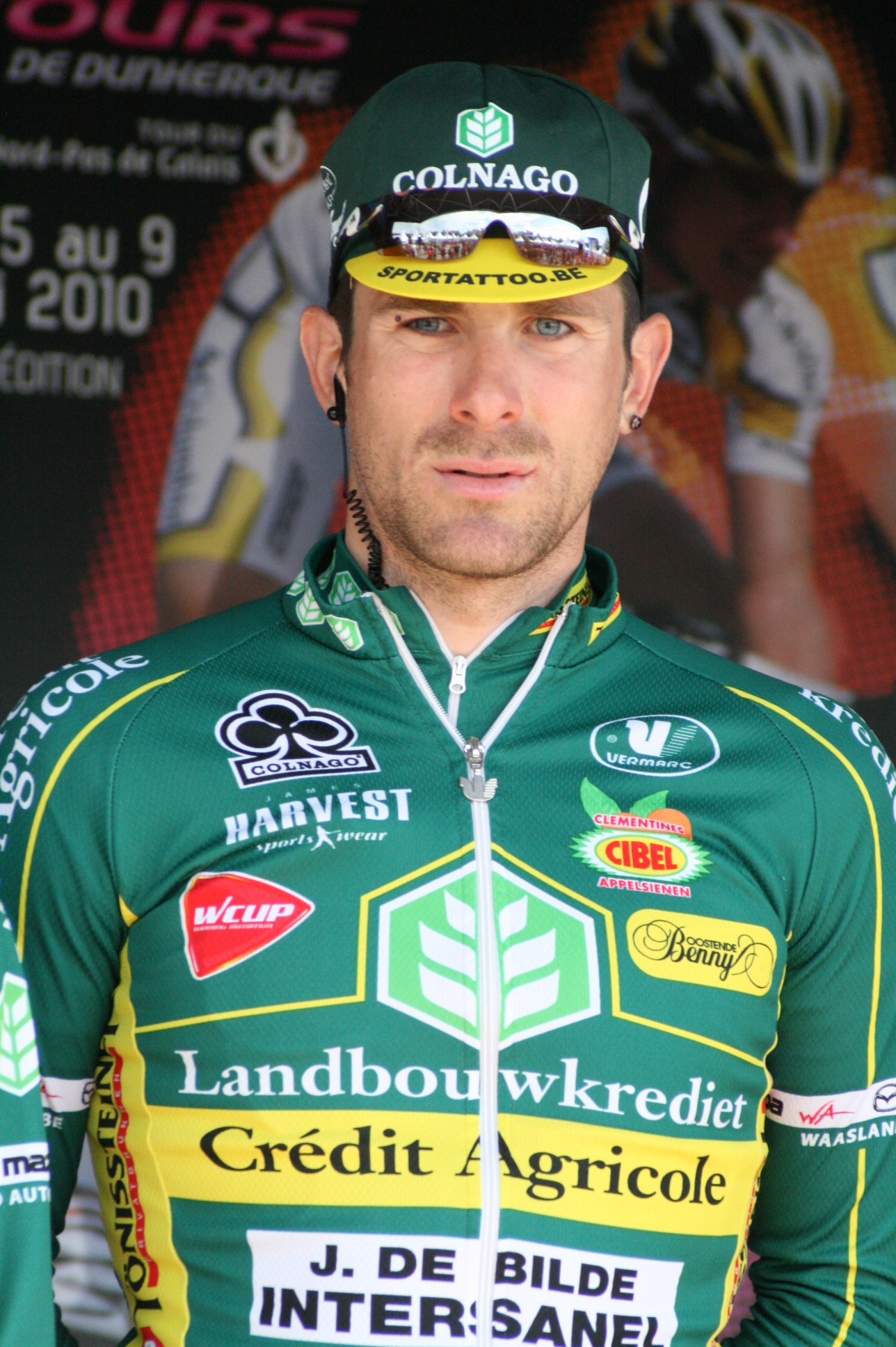
- Boucher at the 2010 Four Days of Dunkirk

Personal information
- Full name: David Boucher
- Born: 17 March 1980 (age 46) Maubeuge, France
- Height: 1.88 m (6 ft 2 in)
- Weight: 78 kg (172 lb)

Cycling career
- Sport: Cycling
- Current team: Acrog–Tormans
- Discipline: Road
- Role: Rider

Amateur teams
- 2003: Marlux–Wincor Nixdorf (stagiaire)
- 2020–: Acrog–Tormans

Professional teams
- 2004: Oktos–Saint-Quentin
- 2005–2006: Unibet.com
- 2007–2010: Landbouwkrediet–Tönissteiner
- 2011: Omega Pharma–Lotto
- 2012–2015: FDJ–BigMat
- 2016–2017: Crelan–Vastgoedservice
- 2018–2019: Tarteletto–Isorex

David Boucher (born 17 March 1980) is a Belgian road cyclist, who currently rides for Belgian amateur team Acrog–Tormans.

== Personal life ==
Midway through the 2013 season, Boucher – previously a French rider – became a naturalised Belgian citizen.

== Major results ==
2004
1st Stage 2 Tour de la Somme
2005
2nd Grand Prix de la Ville de Lillers
2009
8th Overall Delta Tour Zeeland
2010
2nd Antwerpse Havenpijl
9th Ronde van het Groene Hart
2013
8th Overall Three Days of De Panne
2017
2nd Duo Normand
