= Stéphane Bonsergent =

French cyclist

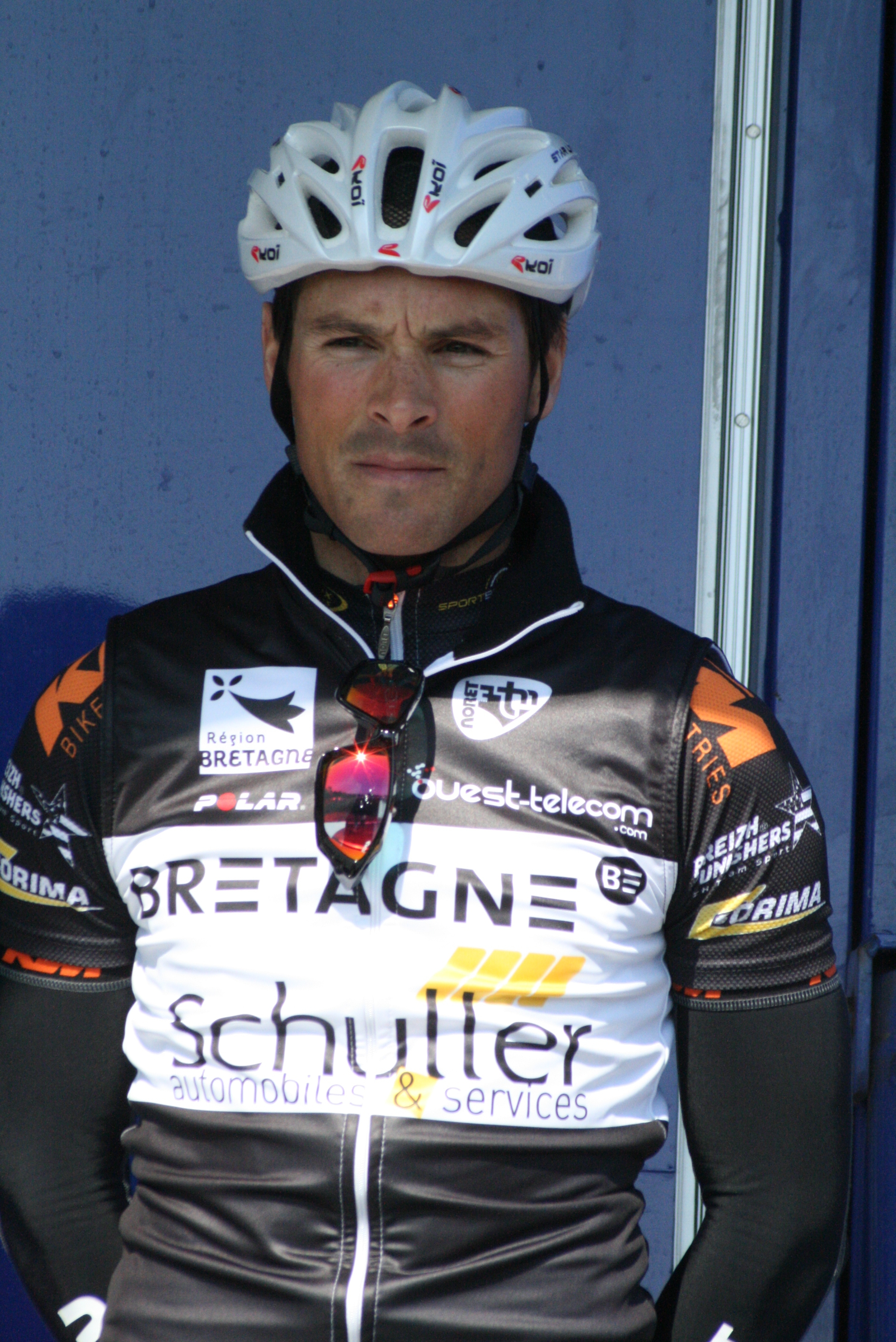
- Bonsergent at the 2011 Four Days of Dunkirk

Personal information
- Full name: Stéphane Bonsergent
- Born: 3 September 1977 (age 49) Sainte-Gemmes-d'Andigné, France
- Height: 1.74 m (5 ft 9 in)
- Weight: 67 kg (148 lb)

Cycling career
- Sport: Cycling
- Current team: Retired
- Disciplines: Road, Cyclo-cross
- Role: Rider

Amateur teams
- 2003–2004: France Police
- 2005: Jean Floc'h–Moréac 56

Professional team
- 2006–2011: Bretagne–Jean Floc'h

Stéphane Bonsergent (born 3 September 1977) is a French former professional racing cyclist, who competed as a professional with the Bretagne–Schuller team, between 2006 and 2011.

== Major results ==
2002
4th Boucle de l'Artois
5th Grand Prix de la Ville de Nogent-sur-Oise
2004
1st Univest Grand Prix
7th Grand Prix de Beuvry-la-Forêt
2005
1st Stage 4 Boucles de la Mayenne
3rd Grand Prix de Beuvry-la-Forêt
5th Overall Tour de Normandie

1st Stage 1

6th Overall Ruban Granitier Breton

1st Stage 4

2006
1st Circuit de la Nive
1st Stages 4 & 9 Tour du Faso
5th GP de Dourges-Hénin-Beaumont
6th Tro-Bro Léon
8th Paris–Troyes
10th Tour de Vendée
2007
1st Ronde du Pays Basque
4th Tro-Bro Léon
6th Paris–Bourges
6th Châteauroux Classic
6th GP de la Ville de Rennes
2008
9th Overall La Tropicale Amissa Bongo

1st Mountains classification
1st Stage 2

9th Cholet-Pays de Loire
10th Paris–Troyes
2009
2nd Tro-Bro Léon
5th GP de Denain
6th Châteauroux Classic
7th GP de Fourmies
9th Grand Prix de la Ville de Lillers
2011
4th Grand Prix de la Ville de Lillers
