= 2014 Tro-Bro Léon =

Race details
- Dates: 20 April 2014
- Stages: 1
- Distance: 202.9 km (126.1 mi)
- Winning time: 4h 56' 15"

Results
	Winner	Adrien Petit (FRA)
	Second	Flavien Dassonville (FRA)
	Third	Cédric Pineau (FRA)

The 2014 Tro-Bro Léon was the 31st edition of the Tro-Bro Léon cycle race and was held on 20 April 2014. The race was won by Adrien Petit.

== General classification ==
Final general classification

Rank	Rider	Time
1	Adrien Petit (FRA)	4h 56' 15"
2	Flavien Dassonville (FRA)	+ 3"
3	Cédric Pineau (FRA)	+ 27"
4	Pierre-Luc Périchon (FRA)	+ 31"
5	Benoît Jarrier (FRA)	+ 41"
6	Bert-Jan Lindeman (NED)	+ 41"
7	Sébastien Turgot (FRA)	+ 41"
8	Vincent Jérôme (FRA)	+ 41"
9	Guillaume Levarlet (FRA)	+ 41"
10	Erwann Corbel (FRA)	+ 44"
