= Frédéric Guesdon =

French cyclist

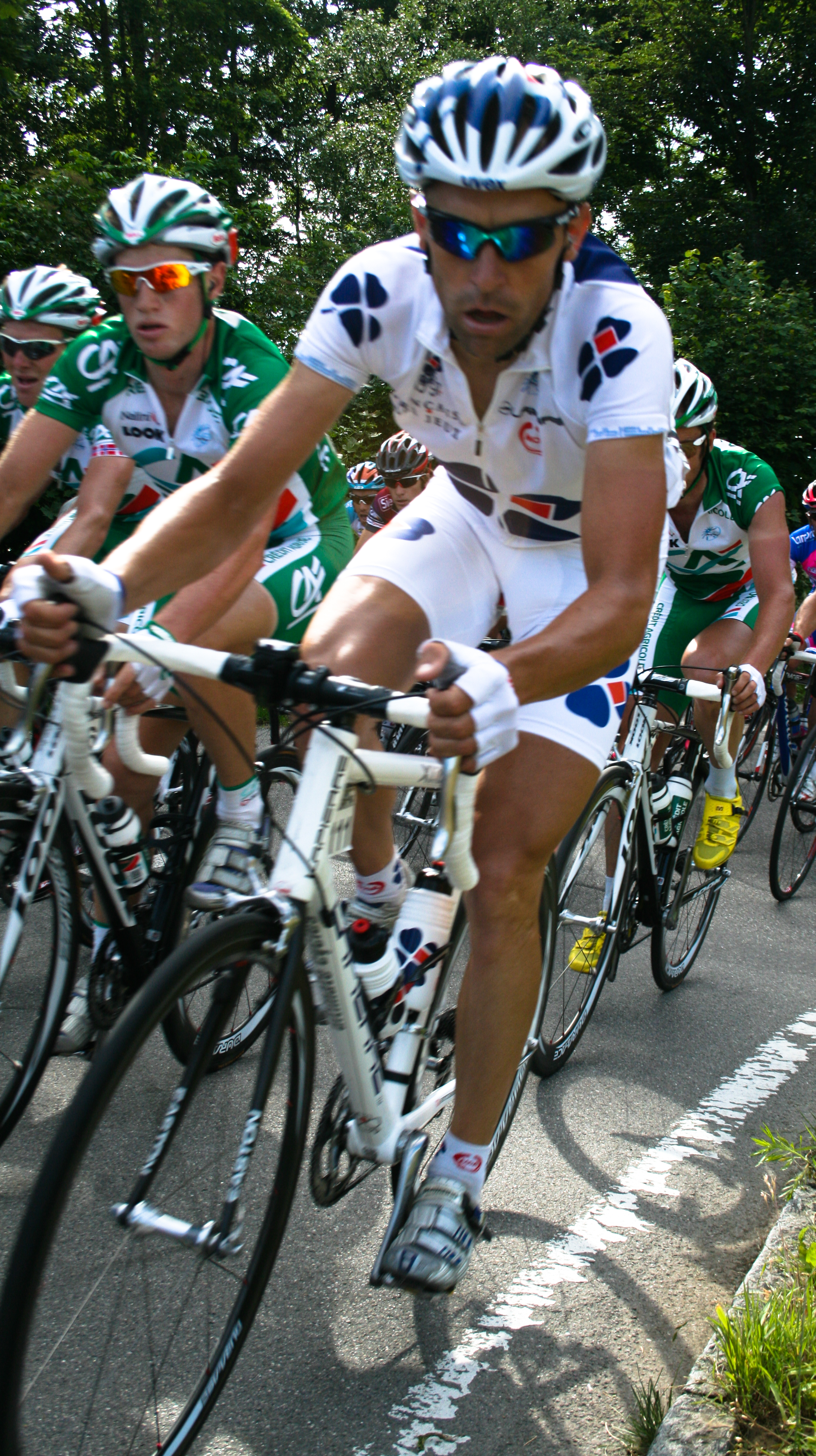

Personal information
- Full name: Frédéric Guesdon
- Born: 14 October 1971 (age 55) Saint-Méen-le-Grand, France
- Height: 1.85 m (6 ft 1 in)
- Weight: 73 kg (161 lb; 11 st 7 lb)

Cycling career
- Sport: Cycling
- Current team: Retired
- Discipline: Road
- Role: Rider
- Rider type: Classics specialist

Professional teams
- 1995: Le Groupement
- 1996: Team Polti
- 1997–2012: Française des Jeux

Managerial team
- 2013–: FDJ

Major wins
- Single-day races and Classics Paris–Roubaix (1997) Paris–Tours (2006)

Frédéric Guesdon (born 14 October 1971) is a French former professional road bicycle racer who competed as a professional between 1995 and 2012, most notably for UCI ProTeam FDJ–BigMat, spending 16 years of his career with the team.

Guesdon was born in Saint-Méen-le-Grand, Brittany. He turned professional in 1995 with the French Le Groupement team and moved on to the Polti team in 1996, where he scored eleventh place at Paris–Roubaix and third place at the French championship. Guesdon had his breakthrough year in 1997. Having signed with the new Française des Jeux team, he scored an early victory for the team in the prestigious spring monument Paris–Roubaix. On the day, of his 1997 Paris–Roubaix victory, he persuaded his team director Marc Madiot to designate him a protected rider alongside his team leader Max Sciandri. After a race full of punctures, Guesdon was with the leading group, containing the defending champion Johan Museeuw, when they entered the velodrome and attacked early to win. Later he would put his race winning move down to inexperience. Guesdon also took victories at the Classic Haribo and a stage in the Tour du Limousin. Guesdon had to wait until 2000 for his next major victory, a stage in the Critérium du Dauphiné Libéré, a feat he repeated in 2002. Despite a complete lack of victories between this win and his next win, over three-and-a-half years later in the 2006 Tropicale Amissa Bongo, Guesdon remained loyal to Française des Jeux and Française des Jeux to him. This paid dividends when Guesdon won the 2006 UCI ProTour race Paris–Tours, his first ProTour victory and the first overall ProTour victory both for Française des Jeux since the inception of the competition in 2005. Following this result he would serve as a guide to new young team recruits.

In 1998 Madiot opined that Guesdon "[was] not a great rider, but he will have some great rides".

A hip injury at the 2012 Tour Down Under provided him with determination to recover for his swansong. He retired on 8 April 2012, after completing Paris–Roubaix.

== Major results ==
1996
3rd Road race, National Road Championships
6th Grand Prix d'Ouverture La Marseillaise
1997
1st Paris–Roubaix
1st Classic Haribo
1st Stage 2 Tour du Limousin
2nd Polynormande
1998
5th Grand Prix de Denain
6th Overall Tour du Limousin
1999
1st Stage 3 Tour de l'Ain
3rd Grand Prix d'Isbergues
2000
1st Stage 1 Critérium du Dauphiné Libéré
1st Stage 1 Giro della Provincia di Lucca
3rd Grand Prix d'Isbergues
8th Dwars door Vlaanderen
2001
1st Mountains classification, Tour Méditerranéen
3rd Grand Prix de Denain
8th Tro-Bro Léon
2002
1st Stage 5 Critérium du Dauphiné Libéré
4th Overall Étoile de Bessèges
2003
5th E3 Prijs Vlaanderen
5th Grand Prix de Denain
5th Grand Prix d'Isbergues
6th Tour of Flanders
7th Kampioenschap van Vlaanderen
2004
2nd Grand Prix d'Isbergues
4th Overall Circuit Franco-Belge
5th Cholet-Pays de Loire
7th Tro-Bro Léon
2006
1st Paris–Tours
2nd Overall La Tropicale Amissa Bongo

1st Prologue

3rd Grand Prix d'Isbergues
4th Overall Tour du Limousin
7th Paris–Roubaix
2007
1st Overall La Tropicale Amissa Bongo
2008
1st Tro-Bro Léon
4th Grand Prix de Denain
7th Tour de Vendée
8th Grand Prix d'Isbergues
9th Grand Prix de Wallonie
2009
6th Grand Prix de la Somme
9th GP Ouest–France
