= 2005 Tour du Haut Var =

Race details
- Dates: 19 February 2005
- Stages: 1
- Distance: 181 km (112.5 mi)
- Winning time: 4h 43' 55"

Results
	Winner	Philippe Gilbert (BEL)
	Second	Ruggero Marzoli (ITA)
	Third	Cédric Vasseur (FRA)

The 2005 Tour du Haut Var was the 37th edition of the Tour du Haut Var cycle race and was held on 19 February 2005. The race started and finished in Draguignan. The race was won by Philippe Gilbert.

== General classification ==
Final general classification

Rank	Rider	Time
1	Philippe Gilbert (BEL)	4h 43' 55"
2	Ruggero Marzoli (ITA)	+ 0"
3	Cédric Vasseur (FRA)	+ 0"
4	Davide Rebellin (ITA)	+ 18"
5	Patrice Halgand (FRA)	+ 18"
6	David Moncoutié (FRA)	+ 18"
7	Florent Brard (FRA)	+ 18"
8	Michael Rogers (AUS)	+ 20"
9	Matej Mugerli (SLO)	+ 32"
10	Giuliano Figueras (ITA)	+ 38"
