= Tro-Bro Léon =

French one-day road cycling race

Race details
- Date: Late April (until 2019); Mid-May (since 2021)
- Region: Brittany, France
- English name: Tour of Pays de Léon
- Local name(s): Tour du Pays Léonard (in French); Tro-Bro Léon (in Breton)
- Nickname: Le Petit Paris–Roubaix
- Discipline: Road
- Competition: UCI Europe Tour; UCI ProSeries
- Type: Single-day
- Race director: Jean-Paul Mellouët
- Web site: www.trobroleon.com

History
- First edition: 1984
- Editions: 42 (as of 2026)
- First winner: Bruno Chemin (FRA)
- Most wins: Philippe Dalibard (FRA) (3 wins)
- Most recent: Filippo Fiorelli (ITA)

Tro-Bro Léon (English: Tour of Léon or The Hipsters’ Paris—Roubaix; French: Tour du Léon) is a professional cycle road race held in Finistère, Brittany. The event was first run in 1984 as an amateur race before becoming a professional race since 2000. The race was established in 2005 as a 1.1 event on the UCI Europe Tour. In 2020, the event joined the UCI ProSeries in its inaugural edition, although the cancellation of the 2020 edition meant that the inaugural event was held in 2021.

== Ribinoù ==
Tro-Bro Léon is often called Le Petit Paris–Roubaix, The Hell of the West or The Hipsters’ Paris—Roubaix due to its similarities with Paris–Roubaix, because Tro-Bro Léon includes around two dozen sections of ribinoù, which longtime race director Jean-Paul Mellouët described as a variety of farm tracks and unpaved roads on the rolling and windy roads of Brittany that can feature cobblestones, dirt paths, and/or gravel. The rider who crosses the line first and the best placed Breton rider each receive a piglet.

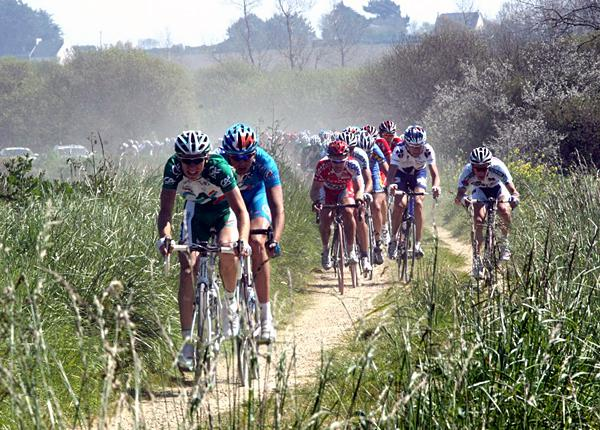
Ribinoù section during the 2007 edition

== Winners ==
Year	Country	Rider	Team
1984	France	Bruno Chemin	
1985	France	Bruno Chemin	
1986	France	Philippe Dalibard	
1987	France	Dominique Le Bon	
1988	France	Philippe Dalibard	
1989	France	Philippe Dalibard	
1990	France	Marc Hibou	
1991	France	William Milloux	
1992	Estonia	Jaan Kirsipuu	
1993	France	Jean-Philippe Rouxel	
1994	France	Stéphane Pétilleau	
1995	France	Camille Coualan	
1996	France	Thierry Bricaud	
1997	France	Frédéric Delalande	Jean Floc'h-Mantes
1998	France	Frédéric Delalande	Jean Floc'h-Mantes
1999	France	Jean-Michel Thilloy	Saint-Quentin–Oktos–MBK
2000	Belgium	Jo Planckaert	Cofidis
2001	France	Jacky Durand	Française des Jeux
2002	Australia	Baden Cooke	Française des Jeux
2003	France	Samuel Dumoulin	Jean Delatour
2004	France	Samuel Dumoulin	AG2R Prévoyance
2005	France	Tristan Valentin	Auber 93
2006	Australia	Mark Renshaw	Crédit Agricole
2007	France	Saïd Haddou	Bouygues Télécom
2008	France	Frédéric Guesdon	Française des Jeux
2009	France	Saïd Haddou	Bbox Bouygues Telecom
2010	France	Jérémy Roy	Française des Jeux
2011	France	Vincent Jérôme	Team Europcar
2012	Canada	Ryan Roth	SpiderTech–C10
2013	France	Francis Mourey	FDJ
2014	France	Adrien Petit	Cofidis
2015	France	Alexandre Geniez	FDJ
2016	Denmark	Martin Mortensen	ONE Pro Cycling
2017	France	Damien Gaudin	Armée de Terre
2018	France	Christophe Laporte	Cofidis
2019	Italy	Andrea Vendrame	Androni Giocattoli–Sidermec
2020	No race due to the COVID-19 pandemic		
2021	Great Britain	Connor Swift	Arkéa–Samsic
2022	France	Hugo Hofstetter	Arkéa–Samsic
2023	Italy	Giacomo Nizzolo	Israel–Premier Tech
2024	Belgium	Arnaud De Lie	Lotto–Dstny
2025	France	Bastien Tronchon	Decathlon–AG2R La Mondiale
2026	Italy	Filippo Fiorelli	Visma–Lease a Bike

=== Wins per country ===
Wins	Country
31	France
3	Italy
2	Australia; Belgium
1	Canada; Denmark; Estonia; Great Britain
