= 2006 Tro-Bro Léon =

Race details
- Dates: 16 April 2006
- Stages: 1
- Distance: 191.7 km (119.1 mi)
- Winning time: 4h 46' 54"

Results
| | Winner | Mark Renshaw (AUS) |
| | Second | Alexandre Usov (BLR) |
| | Third | Jean-Patrick Nazon (FRA) |

The 2006 Tro-Bro Léon was the 23rd edition of the Tro-Bro Léon cycle race and was held on 16 April 2006. The race was won by Mark Renshaw.

== General classification ==
Final general classification

| Rank | Rider | Time |
|---|---|---|
| 1 | Mark Renshaw (AUS) | 4h 46' 54" |
| 2 | Alexandre Usov (BLR) | + 1" |
| 3 | Jean-Patrick Nazon (FRA) | + 1" |
| 4 | Lloyd Mondory (FRA) | + 1" |
| 5 | Lilian Jégou (FRA) | + 1" |
| 6 | Stéphane Bonsergent (FRA) | + 1" |
| 7 | William Bonnet (FRA) | + 1" |
| 8 | Jean-Luc Delpech (FRA) | + 1" |
| 9 | Benoît Sinner (FRA) | + 1" |
| 10 | Eduard Vorganov (RUS) | + 1" |
