= 2010 Chrono des Nations =

Race details
- Dates: 17 October 2010
- Stages: 1
- Distance: 48.5 km (30.14 mi)
- Winning time: 58' 53"

Results
	Winner	David Millar (GBR)
	Second	Edvald Boasson Hagen (NOR)
	Third	Lieuwe Westra (NED)

The 2010 Chrono des Nations was the 29th edition of the Chrono des Nations cycle race and was held on 17 October 2010. The race started and finished in Les Herbiers. The race was won by David Millar.

== General classification ==
Final general classification

Rank	Rider	Time
1	David Millar (GBR)	58' 56"
2	Edvald Boasson Hagen (NOR)	+ 2' 19"
3	Lieuwe Westra (NED)	+ 3' 06"
4	Gustav Larsson (SWE)	+ 3' 10"
5	Markel Irizar (ESP)	+ 3' 32"
6	Nicolas Vogondy (FRA)	+ 3' 36"
7	Rubens Bertogliati (SUI)	+ 3' 57"
8	Jérémy Roy (FRA)	+ 4' 04"
9	Yuriy Krivtsov (UKR)	+ 4' 21"
10	Paul Poux (FRA)	+ 4' 27"
