= Franck Pencolé =

French cyclist

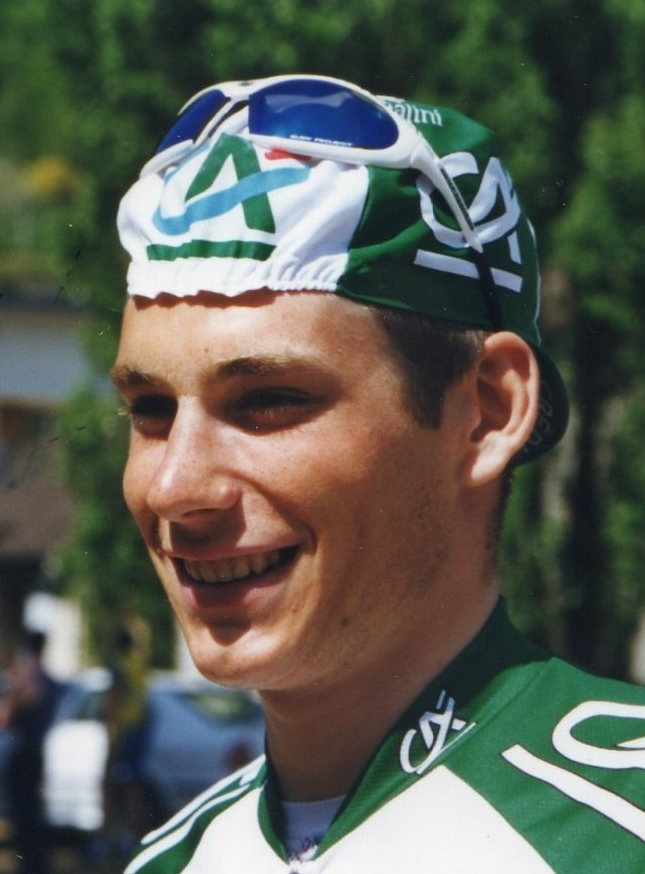
- Pencolé in 1999

Personal information
- Born: 6 November 1976 (age 49) Évreux, France
- Height: 1.84 m (6 ft 0 in)
- Weight: 74 kg (163 lb)

Cycling career
- Sport: Cycling
- Current team: Retired
- Discipline: Road
- Role: Rider

Professional teams
- 1998: BigMat–Auber 93 (stagiaire)
- 1999–2000: Crédit Agricole
- 2001: BigMat–Auber 93
- 2002: Française des Jeux
- 2003–2004: MBK–Oktos–Saint-Quentin

Franck Pencolé (born 6 November 1976) is a French former professional road cyclist.

== Major results ==
1997
9th Paris–Mantes
1998
1st Stage 4 Transalsace International
3rd Omloop Het Nieuwsblad Beloften
6th Ronde van Vlaanderen U23
2001
3rd Omloop van het Waasland
2002
1st Mountains classification, Tour of Belgium
7th Tro-Bro Léon
8th Ronde van Midden-Zeeland
2003
4th Omloop van het Waasland
6th Trophée des Grimpeurs
6th Paris–Camembert
8th Scheldeprijs
2004
3rd Classic Loire-Atlantique
5th Dwars door Vlaanderen
5th Route Adélie
7th A Travers le Morbihan
