= Stéphane Barthe =

French cyclist (born 1972)

Personal information
- Full name: Stéphane Barthe
- Born: 5 December 1972 (age 53) Ermont, France
- Height: 1.7 m (5 ft 7 in)
- Weight: 65 kg (143 lb)

Cycling career
- Sport: Cycling
- Current team: Retired
- Discipline: Road
- Role: Rider

Amateur teams
- 2004: US Montauban 82
- 2005: Oddas–Diemme

Professional teams
- 1996–2000: Petit Casino
- 2001: U.S. Postal Service
- 2002–2004: Saint-Quentin–Oktos

Stéphane Barthe (French pronunciation: [stefan baʁt]; born 5 December 1972) is a French former racing cyclist. He won the French national road race title in 1997.

== Major results ==
1995
2nd Overall Tour du Loir-et-Cher
1996
1st Stage 8 Ruban Granitier Breton
3rd Overall Tour de Normandie
1997
1st Road race, National Road Championships
1st Châteauroux Classic
1st Stage 1 Critérium International
2nd Overall Tour du Poitou Charentes et de la Vienne
2nd Kuurne–Brussels–Kuurne
2nd Paris–Mantes
3rd Bordeaux–Caudéran
7th A Travers le Morbihan
7th Classic Haribo
8th Overall Giro di Puglia
1998
1st Stage 1 Setmana Catalana de Ciclisme
6th Overall Tour de l'Oise

1st Stage 2b

8th Tour de Vendée
1999
1st Stage 3 Four Days of Dunkirk
1st Stage 1 Critérium International
1st Stage 3 Tour du Poitou Charentes et de la Vienne
4th Grand Prix de Denain
5th Overall Tour de l'Oise
2000
3rd Overall Danmark Rundt
5th Road race, National Road Championships
7th Overall Four Days of Dunkirk
10th Classic Haribo
2001
10th Trofeo Luis Puig
2002
1st Stage 4 Tour de Beauce
6th Tour de la Somme
8th Tour de Vendée
10th Tro-Bro Léon
2003
2nd Time trial, National Road Championships
8th Overall Tour du Poitou Charentes et de la Vienne
8th Tour de Vendée
2004
1st Overall Tour du Poitou Charentes et de la Vienne
3rd Bordeaux–Saintes
4th Bordeaux–Caudéran
2005
4th Time trial, National Road Championships
7th Overall Tour de Normandie
7th Grand Prix de la Ville de Lillers
