= 1998 Grand Prix de Denain =

Race details
- Dates: 23 April 1998
- Stages: 1
- Distance: 189 km (117.4 mi)
- Winning time: 4h 18' 25"

Results
	Winner	Jaan Kirsipuu (EST)
	Second	Jeroen Blijlevens (NED)
	Third	Frédéric Moncassin (FRA)

The 1998 Grand Prix de Denain was the 40th edition of the Grand Prix de Denain cycle race and was held on 23 April 1998. The race was won by Jaan Kirsipuu.

== General classification ==
Final general classification

Rank	Rider	Time
1	Jaan Kirsipuu (EST)	4h 18' 25"
2	Jeroen Blijlevens (NED)	+ 0"
3	Frédéric Moncassin (FRA)	+ 0"
4	Enrico Cassani (ITA)	+ 0"
5	Frédéric Guesdon (FRA)	+ 0"
6	Markus Zberg (SUI)	+ 0"
7	Hans De Meester (BEL)	+ 0"
8	Koen Beeckman (BEL)	+ 0"
9	Franck Morelle (FRA)	+ 0"
10	Hendrik Van Dijck (BEL)	+ 0"
