= 2002 Tro-Bro Léon =

Race details
- Dates: 2 June 2002
- Stages: 1
- Distance: 184.3 km (114.5 mi)
- Winning time: 4h 30' 13"

Results
	Winner	Baden Cooke (AUS)
	Second	Walter Bénéteau (FRA)
	Third	Sébastien Hinault (FRA)

The 2002 Tro-Bro Léon was the 19th edition of the Tro-Bro Léon cycle race and was held on 2 June 2002. The race was won by Baden Cooke.

== General classification ==
Final general classification

Rank	Rider	Time
1	Baden Cooke (AUS)	4h 30' 13"
2	Walter Bénéteau (FRA)	+ 2"
3	Sébastien Hinault (FRA)	+ 32"
4	Franck Rénier (FRA)	+ 32"
5	Bert Scheirlinckx (BEL)	+ 33"
6	Christophe Edaleine (FRA)	+ 35"
7	Franck Pencolé (FRA)	+ 39"
8	Anthony Morin (FRA)	+ 2' 22"
9	Anthony Geslin (FRA)	+ 2' 25"
10	Stéphane Barthe (FRA)	+ 2' 34"
