= Franck Rénier =

French cyclist

Franck Renier
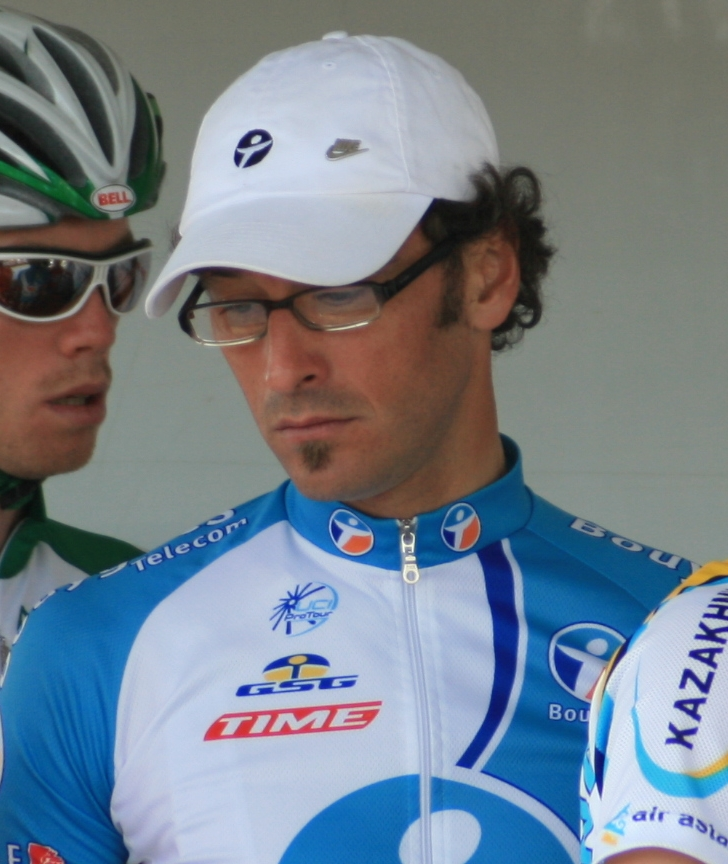

Personal information
- Full name: Franck Renier
- Born: 11 April 1974 (age 52) Laval, France
- Height: 1.83 m (6 ft 0 in)
- Weight: 69 kg (152 lb)

Cycling career
- Sport: Cycling
- Discipline: Road
- Role: Rider

Amateur team
- 1998–1999: Vendée U

Professional team
- 2000–2008: Bonjour

Franck Renier (born 11 April 1974 in Laval, Mayenne) is a French former professional road bicycle racer.

== Major results ==
1999
5th Tro-Bro Léon
2000
4th Tro-Bro Léon
2001
1st Tour du Finistère
5th A Travers le Morbihan
8th Scheldeprijs
9th Tro-Bro Léon
2002
4th Tro-Bro Léon
7th Overall Paris–Corrèze
2003
2nd Grand Prix d'Isbergues
4th Paris–Brussels
5th Paris–Tours
5th Paris–Camembert
9th Grand Prix d'Ouverture La Marseillaise
10th Grand Prix de Villers-Cotterêts
2004
3rd Overall Tour du Limousin
4th Overall Tour de l'Ain
4th Grand Prix de Villers-Cotterêts
8th Classic Haribo
9th Polynormande
10th Tro-Bro Léon
2006
8th Omloop Het Volk

=== Grand Tour results ===
- Vuelta a España - 121st (2006)
- Giro d'Italia - 134th (2005)
- Tour de France
  - 85th (2002)
  - 95th (2003)
  - 114th (2004)
  - 116th (2001)
