= 2004 Tro-Bro Léon =

Race details
- Dates: 25 April 2004
- Stages: 1
- Distance: 195.2 km (121.3 mi)
- Winning time: 5h 02' 26"

Results
	Winner	Samuel Dumoulin (FRA)
	Second	Christophe Mengin (FRA)
	Third	Bert Scheirlinckx (BEL)

The 2004 Tro-Bro Léon was the 21st edition of the Tro-Bro Léon cycle race and was held on 25 April 2004. The race was won by Samuel Dumoulin.

== General classification ==
Final general classification

Rank	Rider	Time
1	Samuel Dumoulin (FRA)	5h 02' 26"
2	Christophe Mengin (FRA)	+ 2"
3	Bert Scheirlinckx (BEL)	+ 5"
4	Andrey Mizurov (KAZ)	+ 14"
5	Nicolas Inaudi (FRA)	+ 46"
6	Thomas Voeckler (FRA)	+ 49"
7	Frédéric Guesdon (FRA)	+ 55"
8	Erki Pütsep (EST)	+ 55"
9	Jo Planckaert (BEL)	+ 55"
10	Franck Rénier (FRA)	+ 55"
