= 2000 Tro-Bro Léon =

Race details
- Dates: 28 May 2000
- Stages: 1
- Distance: 180.6 km (112.2 mi)
- Winning time: 4h 36' 16"

Results
	Winner	Jo Planckaert (BEL)
	Second	Samuel Sánchez (ESP)
	Third	Ludovic Capelle (BEL)

The 2000 Tro-Bro Léon was the 17th edition of the Tro-Bro Léon cycle race and was held on 28 May 2000. The race was won by Jo Planckaert.

== General classification ==
Final general classification

Rank	Rider	Time
1	Jo Planckaert (BEL)	4h 36' 16"
2	Samuel Sánchez (ESP)	+ 0"
3	Ludovic Capelle (BEL)	+ 0"
4	Franck Rénier (FRA)	+ 0"
5	Hans De Clercq (BEL)	+ 8"
6	Jürgen Vermeersch (BEL)	+ 9"
7	Frédéric Finot (FRA)	+ 11"
8	Damien Nazon (FRA)	+ 18"
9	Jean-Patrick Nazon (FRA)	+ 18"
10	Saulius Ruškys (LTU)	+ 18"
