= Erwann Corbel =

French cyclist

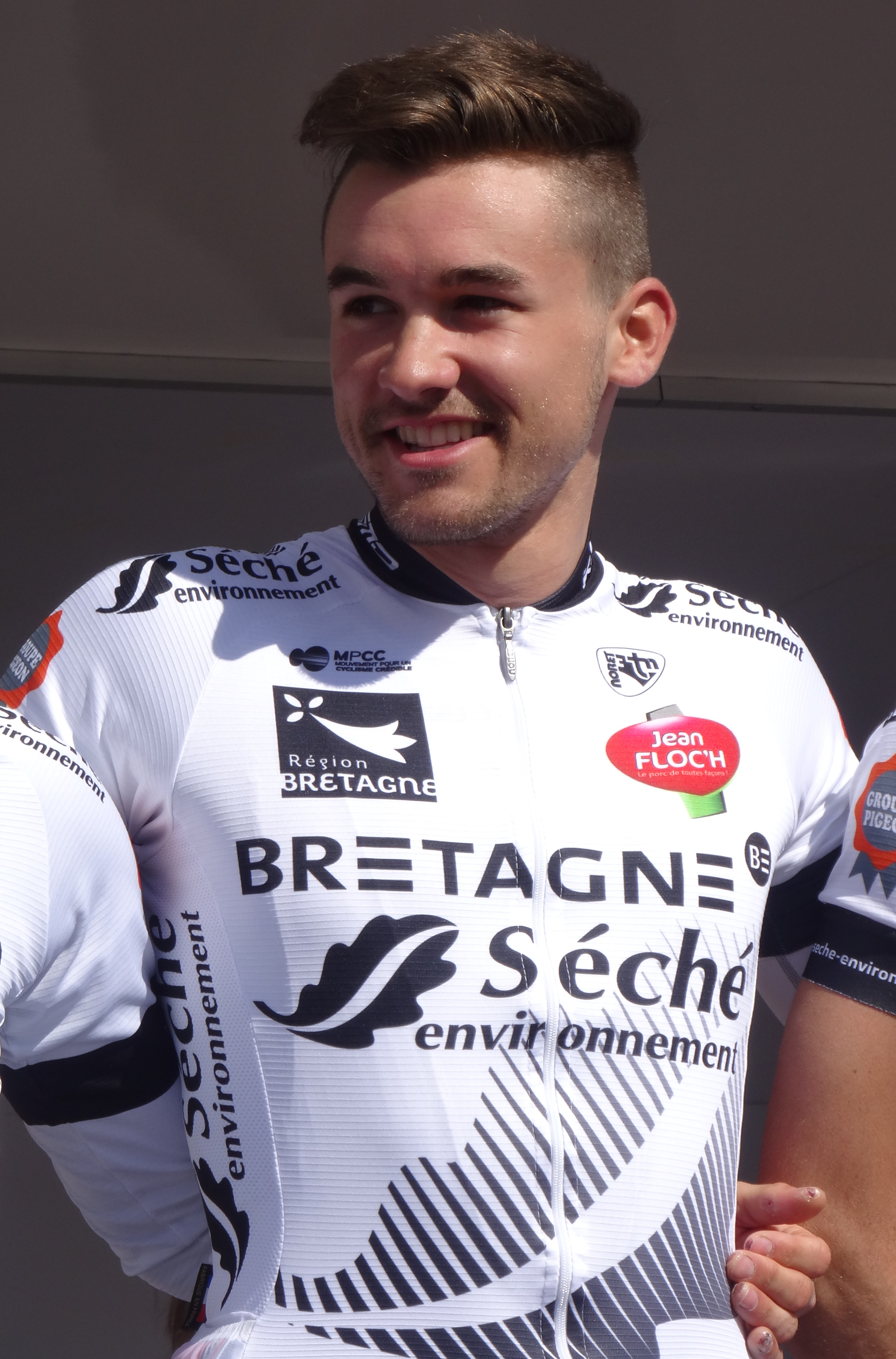
- Corbel in 2014.

Personal information
- Full name: Erwann Corbel
- Born: 20 April 1991 (age 35) Rennes, France
- Height: 1.80 m (5 ft 11 in)

Cycling career
- Sport: Cycling
- Current team: ES Torigni
- Discipline: Road
- Role: Rider

Amateur teams
- 2010–2011: Sojasun U23–ACNC
- 2012: Côtes d'Armor–Marie Morin
- 2015–2016: VC Pays de Loudéac
- 2020–: ES Torigni

Professional teams
- 2012: Cofidis (stagiaire)
- 2013–2014: Bretagne–Séché Environnement
- 2017: Fortuneo–Vital Concept
- 2018: Vital Concept

Erwann Corbel (born 20 April 1991) is a French cyclist, who currently rides for French amateur team ES Torigni. Corbel rode professionally between 2013 and 2014 and 2017 to 2018 for the Fortuneo–Oscaro (over two spells) and Vital Concept teams, prior to initially retiring from the sport.

== Major results ==
2010
1st Stage 1 Tour de New Caledonia
2012
1st Stage 3 Kreiz Breizh Elites
1st Stage 1 Tour des Deux-Sèvres
1st Stage 4 Trophée Aven Moros
2nd Grand Prix des Hauts-de-France
10th Overall Tour de Gironde
2013
1st Stage 2b Kreiz Breizh Elites
7th Overall Tour de Picardie
8th Circuito de Getxo
9th Boucles de l'Aulne
10th Val d'Ille Classic
2014
4th Le Samyn
10th Tro-Bro Léon
2015
1st Road race, Brittany Regional Road Championships
1st Bourg-Arbent-Bourg
1st Boucles de l'Austreberthe
1st Ronde Briochine
2nd Circuit de l'Essor
2nd Manche-Atlantique
2nd Paris–Mantes-en-Yvelines
3rd Flèche de Locminé
3rd Tour du Canton de Saint-Ciers
3rd Essor Breton
2017
6th Grote Prijs Jef Scherens
7th Grand Prix de la Somme
