= Cédric Pineau =

Road bicycle racer

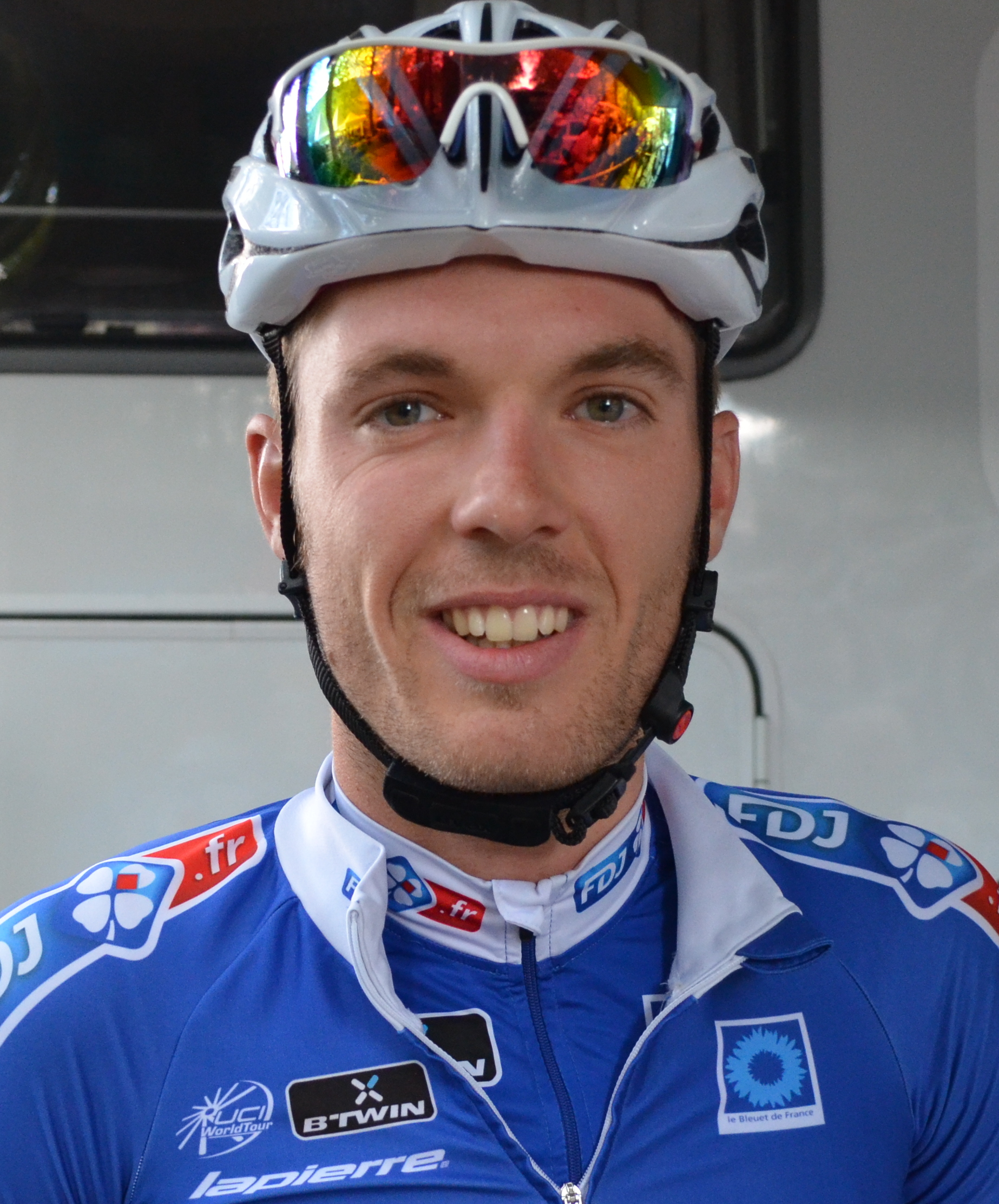
- Pineau at the 2014 Tour de l'Ain

Personal information
- Full name: Cédric Pineau
- Born: 8 May 1985 (age 41) Migennes, France
- Height: 1.77 m (5 ft 9 1/2 in)
- Weight: 68 kg (150 lb)

Cycling career
- Sport: Cycling
- Current team: Retired
- Disciplines: Road; Cyclo-cross
- Role: Rider
- Rider type: Puncheur (road); Cyclo-cross

Amateur teams
- 2006: Agritubel (stagiaire)
- 2007: Roubaix–Lille Métropole

Professional teams
- 2008–2009: Ag2r–La Mondiale
- 2010: Roubaix–Lille Métropole
- 2011–2017: FDJ

Cédric Pineau (born 8 May 1985) is a French former road bicycle racer, who rode professionally between 2007 and 2017 with the Ag2r–La Mondiale, Roubaix–Lille Métropole and FDJ teams.

== Major results ==
2006
1st Troyes–Dijon
2007
1st Troyes–Dijon
2008
2nd Paris–Bourges
4th Grand Prix de la Somme
10th Grand Prix d'Isbergues
2009
10th Grand Prix d'Isbergues
2010
1st Paris–Troyes
3rd Le Samyn
3rd Tour du Finistère
4th Overall Tour de Bretagne

1st Stage 6

4th Overall Tour du Haut Var
4th Overall Four Days of Dunkirk
4th Overall Circuit de Lorraine
4th Grand Prix de la Ville de Lillers
4th Cholet-Pays de Loire
4th Grand Prix de la Somme
4th Tour de Vendée
5th Classic Loire Atlantique
7th Overall Tour du Poitou-Charentes
10th De Vlaamse Pijl
2011
8th Grand Prix d'Ouverture La Marseillaise
9th Overall Tour du Haut Var
2013
8th Tro-Bro Léon
9th Tour du Finistère
2014
3rd Tro-Bro Léon

=== Grand Tour general classification results timeline ===
Grand Tour	2012	2013	2014	2015	2016
Giro d'Italia	—	—	—	121	—
Tour de France	133	—	102	—	DNF
Vuelta a España	—	103	77	—	—

Legend
—	Did not compete
DNF	Did not finish
