= Lieuwe Westra =

Dutch racing cyclist (1982–2023)

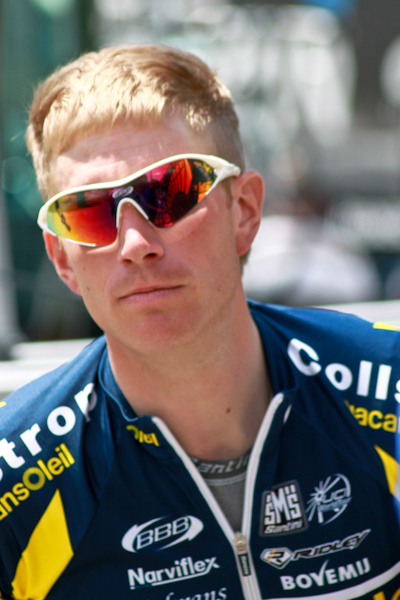
- Westra at the 2011 Critérium du Dauphiné

Personal information
- Full name: Lieuwe Westra
- Nickname: It Beest
- Born: 11 September 1982 Mûnein, Netherlands
- Died: 14 January 2023 (aged 40) Medemblik, Netherlands
- Height: 1.85 m (6 ft 1 in)
- Weight: 74 kg (163 lb)

Cycling career
- Sport: Cycling
- Discipline: Road
- Role: Rider
- Rider type: Time trialist

Professional teams
- 2006–2008: KrolStonE Continental Team
- 2009–2013: Vacansoleil
- 2014–2016: Astana

Major wins
- Stage races Danmark Rundt (2012) Three Days of De Panne (2016) Single-day races and Classics National Time Trial Championships (2012, 2013)

Lieuwe Westra (11 September 1982 – 14 January 2023) was a Dutch professional racing cyclist who rode professionally between 2006 and 2016 for the KrolStonE Continental Team, Vacansoleil–DCM and Astana teams.

== Life and career ==
Born in Mûnein, Westra finished second at the 2012 Paris–Nice, a UCI World Tour race; he also won the queen stage to Mende. This particular stage finished atop the Côte de la Croix-Neuve–Montée Laurent Jalabert – a 3 km (1.9 mi) climb at an average gradient of 10.1%. He attacked inside the final kilometer and the lead group piloted by race leader Bradley Wiggins could not reel him in. He freewheeled over the finishing line, sparking speculation that he could have put on the leader's jersey had he pursued his effort, since the win put him 6 seconds in arrears of Wiggins. He would finish Paris-Nice 8 seconds down on the Briton in the general classification. In August, Westra won the overall classification of the 2012 Danmark Rundt, a six-stage race held in Denmark. He won the event's individual time trial, helping him seal the victory as it netted him the leader's jersey, which he would not relinquish. Ramūnas Navardauskas of the Garmin–Barracuda squad finished second with a deficit of 10 seconds. Westra earned his first victory of the 2013 season at the Tour of California, where he foiled the sprinters' plans by breaking away with 5 km (3.1 mi) and managed to resist to the lead group. Francisco Mancebo joined him in his bid for victory, the pair cooperated and Westra won the two-man sprint.

After five years with the Vacansoleil–DCM team, Westra joined Astana on a two-year contract, for the 2014 and 2015 seasons.

On Sunday 8 January 2017, Westra announced his retirement via his Facebook page. He wrote "Today I have decided to stop racing. I cannot afford to continue. Thanks to A Boskamp and K Snijder! Ok I stop but go now and I have time to solve these issues briefly Thanks to cycling world ciaoooo westra". This post was subsequently deleted, however the next day the retirement was confirmed via the Twitter account for the Wanty–Groupe Gobert team. In an interview with the Dutch television channel NOS in July 2017 he reported that struggles with depression were the reason for his retirement. Weight gain from his antidepressants were further preventing a continuation of his professional cycling career. Afterwards he announced his intention to move to Australia in September 2017 to marry his Australian girlfriend Ingrid Kimber.

He published his autobiography Het Beest: het wielerleven van Lieuwe Westra in 2018. In this book he admitted to faking injuries and illnesses to get Therapeutic Use Exemptions for performance-enhancing drugs, particularly cortisone. A practice that, he claimed, was prevalent among riders of his generation and that the team physicians readily aided to. He denied using EPO or blood doping, though admitted he probably would have, had he made the move from amateur to professional cycling sooner.

Westra returned to Europe in 2019 to open a hostel for cycling tourists in Calpe with his wife.

While in Spain his problems with depression and substance abuse soon began to worsen. This was accelerated by him witnessing the serious accident of Amy Pieters on 23 December 2021 in Calpe. His behaviour got increasingly aggressive which culminated in him being given a contact ban with his wife Ingrid in May 2022. His brother Jan Hendrik took him back to the Netherlands where his behaviour didn't improve and police had to remove him from the house of his mother.

In the last months of his life he cut all contact to his family and friends from the cycling community. He lived in a garage in Zwaagdijk in what his biographer Thomas Sijtsma, who last saw him in September 2022, described as "inhumane conditions".

Westra died on 14 January 2023, at the age of 40. An autopsy found four different substances in his body: A sleeping aid, Crystal Meth, MDMA and speed. An overdose of the latter proved fatal.

== Major results ==
2007
4th Overall OZ Wielerweekend

1st Stage 2 (ITT)

2008
1st Stage 2 Tour Alsace
2nd Overall Olympia's Tour
3rd Duo Normand (with Jos Pronk)
3rd Schaal Sels
4th Omloop der Kempen
5th Hel van het Mergelland
6th Overall Tour du Loir-et-Cher
6th Ronde van Overijssel
9th Grote Prijs Jef Scherens
2009
1st Overall Tour de Picardie

1st Stage 1

1st Arno Wallaard Memorial
6th Ronde van het Groene Hart
2010
3rd Time trial, National Road Championships
3rd Chrono des Nations
4th Duo Normand (with Jens Mouris)
5th Overall Three Days of De Panne
7th Profronde van Fryslan
2011
1st Classic Loire Atlantique
1st Prologue Tour of Belgium
2nd Overall Three Days of De Panne

1st Mountains classification

3rd Overall Volta ao Algarve
8th Time trial, UCI Road World Championships
8th Chrono des Nations
2012
1st Time trial, National Road Championships
1st Overall Danmark Rundt

1st Stage 5 (ITT)

2nd Overall Paris–Nice

1st Stage 5

2nd Overall Three Days of De Panne
2nd Overall Tour of Belgium
2013
1st Time trial, National Road Championships
1st Stage 1 Tour of California
3rd Overall Volta ao Algarve
5th Overall Three Days of De Panne
8th Overall Étoile de Bessèges
8th Overall Paris–Nice
2014
1st Stage 7 Volta a Catalunya
1st Stage 7 Critérium du Dauphiné
Combativity award Stage 5 Tour de France
2016
1st Overall Three Days of De Panne

=== Grand Tour general classification results timeline ===
| Grand Tour | 2009 | 2010 | 2011 | 2012 | 2013 | 2014 | 2015 |
|---|---|---|---|---|---|---|---|
| Giro d'Italia | Did not contest during his career | | | | | | |
| Tour de France | — | — | 128 | DNF | DNF | 79 | 77 |
| Vuelta a España | 87 | — | — | — | DNF | — | — |

Legend
| — | Did not compete |
| DNF | Did not finish |

== See also ==
- List of Dutch Olympic cyclists

Sporting positions
| Preceded by Stef Clement | Dutch National Time Trial; Champion; 2012–2013 | Succeeded by Tom Dumoulin |
