= Guillaume Levarlet =

French road bicycle racer

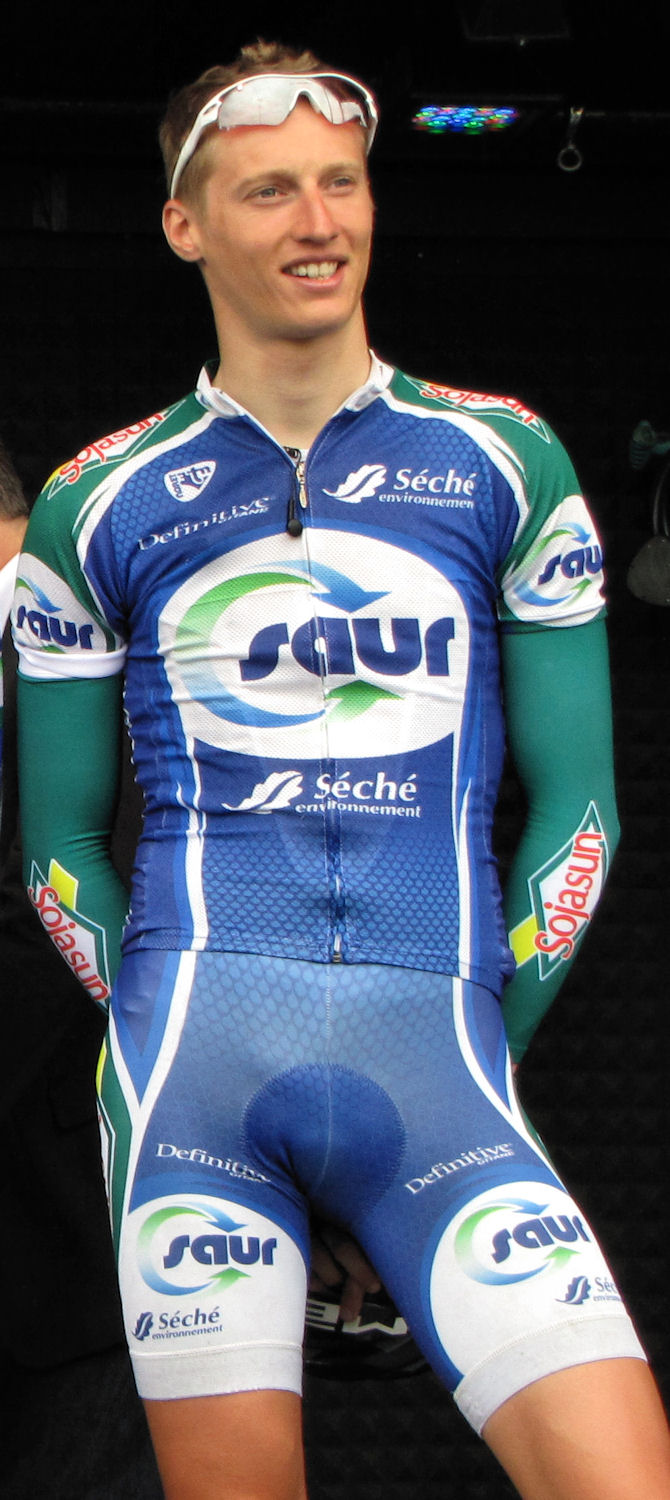

Personal information
- Full name: Guillaume Levarlet
- Born: 25 July 1985 (age 41) Beauvais, France
- Height: 1.83 m (6 ft 0 in)
- Weight: 67 kg (148 lb; 10.6 st)

Cycling career
- Sport: Cycling
- Current team: Retired
- Discipline: Road
- Role: Rider

Amateur teams
- 2005–2006: CC Nogent-sur-Oise
- 2007: Auber 93

Professional teams
- 2008–2009: Française des Jeux
- 2010–2012: Saur–Sojasun
- 2013–2014: Cofidis
- 2015–2016: Auber 93
- 2017: Wanty–Groupe Gobert
- 2018: St. Michel–Auber93

Guillaume Levarlet (born 25 July 1985) is a French former road bicycle racer, who competed professionally between 2008 and 2018 for the Française des Jeux, Saur–Sojasun, Cofidis, Wanty–Groupe Gobert and St. Michel–Auber93 teams.

== Major results ==
2005
9th Liège–Bastogne–Liège U23
10th La Côte Picarde
2006
1st La Côte Picarde
9th Overall Grand Prix de la Somme
9th Boucle de l'Artois
2007
1st Tour du Jura
2nd Road race, National Under-23 Road Championships
6th Overall Tour de l'Avenir
7th Overall Tour de l'Ain
7th Polynormande
10th Tro-Bro Léon
2008
7th Tour du Doubs
7th Grand Prix de la Somme
9th Tour de Vendée
2009
3rd Tour du Doubs
4th Boucles de l'Aulne
5th Overall Paris–Corrèze
10th Overall Route du Sud
2010
2nd Overall Tour du Gévaudan Languedoc-Roussillon

1st Stage 1

6th Eschborn–Frankfurt City Loop
10th Tour du Doubs
2011
1st Overall Tour du Gévaudan Languedoc-Roussillon

1st Stages 1 & 2

5th Route Adélie
5th Tour de Vendée
8th Grand Prix de Wallonie
2012
2nd Overall Vuelta a Castilla y León
6th Les Boucles du Sud Ardèche
6th Klasika Primavera
2013
4th Tour du Doubs
6th Overall Tour du Gévaudan
6th Polynormande
7th Overall Rhône-Alpes Isère Tour
9th Overall Route du Sud
10th Cholet-Pays de Loire
10th Boucles de l'Aulne
10th Grand Prix de la Somme
2014
6th Paris–Troyes
9th Tro-Bro Léon
9th Paris–Tours
2016
9th Overall La Méditerranéenne

=== Grand Tour general classification results timeline ===
Grand Tour	2008	2009	2010	2011	2012	2013	2014
Giro d'Italia	113	—	—	—	—	—	—
Tour de France	—	—	—	—	75	61	—
Vuelta a España	—	—	—	—	—	—	49

Legend
—	Did not compete
DNF	Did not finish
