= Egidijus Juodvalkis =

Lithuanian cyclist (born 1988)

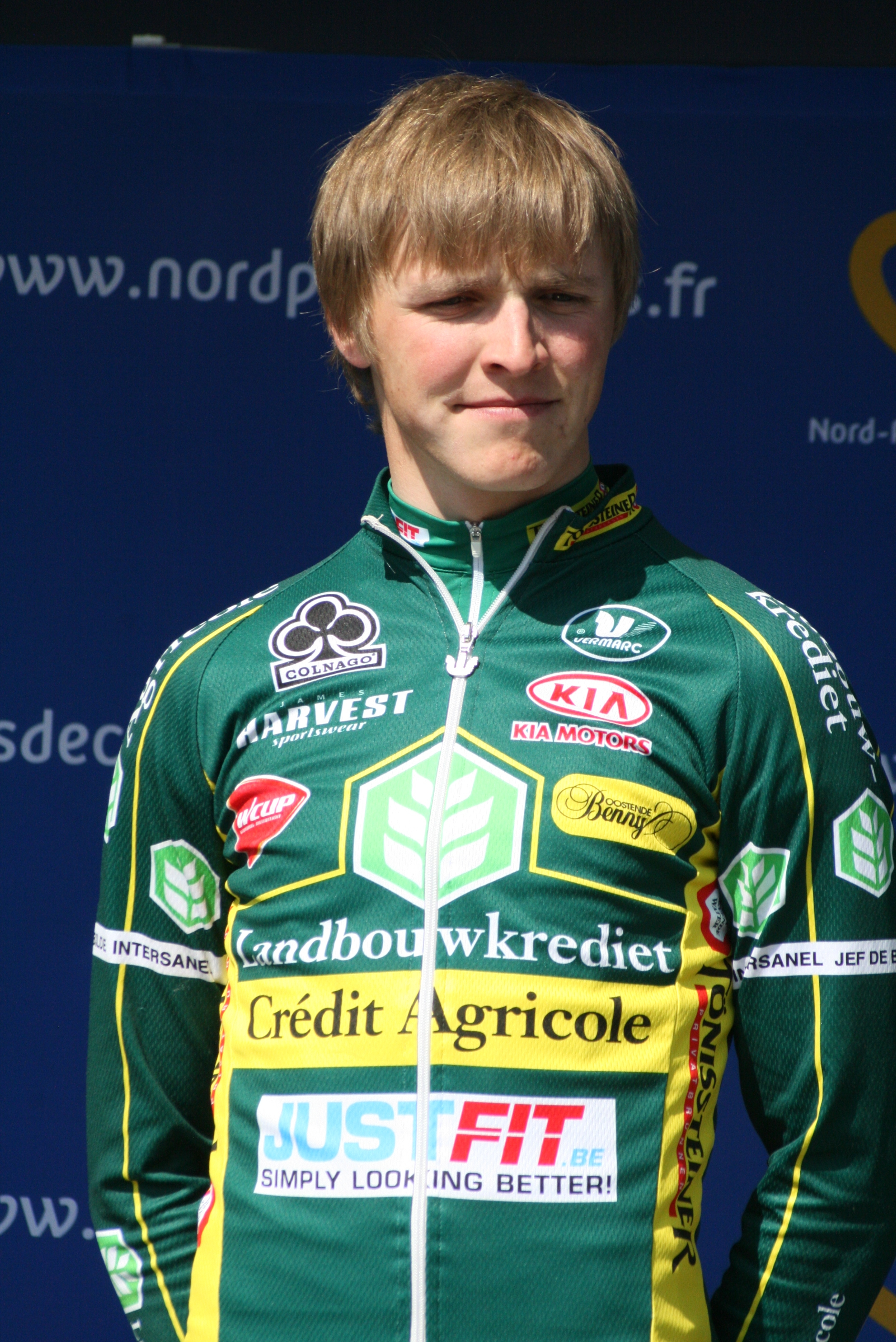
- Juodvalkis at the 2011 Four Days of Dunkirk

Personal information
- Born: 8 April 1988 (age 38)

Cycling career
- Sport: Cycling
- Current team: Retired
- Discipline: Road
- Role: Rider

Professional teams
- 2007: Klaipėda Splendid
- 2008: Ulan
- 2009: Team Piemonte
- 2010: Palmans–Cras
- 2011–2013: Landbouwkrediet
- 2014: Team3M
- 2015: Colba–Superano Ham

Egidijus Juodvalkis (born 8 April 1988) is a Lithuanian former road cyclist.

== Major results ==
2008
4th Overall Dookoła Mazowsza
9th Overall Five Rings of Moscow
2009
1st Road race, National Road Championships
2010
3rd Omloop van het Waasland
5th Arno Wallaard Memorial
6th GP Stad Zottegem
6th Grand Prix de la ville de Pérenchies
10th Nationale Sluitingsprijs
2011
5th Overall Tour de Picardie

1st Stage 1

10th Dwars door de Antwerpse Kempen
2012
2nd Omloop van het Waasland
5th Road race, National Road Championships
5th GP Stad Zottegem
2013
1st De Kustpijl
4th Road race, National Road Championships
5th Grand Prix Pino Cerami
10th Dutch Food Valley Classic
2014
5th Road race, National Road Championships
7th Ronde van Overijssel
8th Ronde van Zeeland Seaports
2015
3rd Road race, National Road Championships
