= 2013 Tro-Bro Léon =

Race details
- Dates: 14 April 2013
- Stages: 1
- Distance: 203.8 km (126.6 mi)
- Winning time: 5h 12' 43"

Results
	Winner	Francis Mourey (FRA)
	Second	Johan Le Bon (FRA)
	Third	Anthony Geslin (FRA)

The 2013 Tro-Bro Léon was the 30th edition of the Tro-Bro Léon cycle race and was held on 14 April 2013. The race was won by Francis Mourey.

== General classification ==
Final general classification

Rank	Rider	Time
1	Francis Mourey (FRA)	5h 12' 43"
2	Johan Le Bon (FRA)	+ 58"
3	Anthony Geslin (FRA)	+ 1' 16"
4	Gert Jõeäär (EST)	+ 1' 16"
5	Rémi Cusin (FRA)	+ 1' 16"
6	Cyril Lemoine (FRA)	+ 1' 16"
7	Pierre-Luc Périchon (FRA)	+ 1' 20"
8	Cédric Pineau (FRA)	+ 2' 48"
9	Florian Vachon (FRA)	+ 2' 48"
10	Koen Barbé (BEL)	+ 2' 52"
