= 2016 Three Days of De Panne =

2016 UCI Europe Tour

Race details
- Dates: March 29, 2016–March 31, 2016
- Stages: 4
- Distance: 535 km (332 mi)
- Winning time: 12hr 08' 19"

Results
Jersey awarded to the overall winner	Winner	Lieuwe Westra (NED)	(Astana)
	Second	Alexander Kristoff (NOR)	(Team Katusha)
	Third	Alexey Lutsenko (KAZ)	(Astana)
Jersey awarded to the points classification winner	Points	Alexander Kristoff (NOR)	(Team Katusha)
Jersey awarded to the mountains classification winner	Mountains	Loïc Vliegen (BEL)	(BMC Racing Team)
Jersey awarded to the sprints classification winner	Sprints	Danny van Poppel (NED)	(Team Sky)
	Team	Astana	

The 2016 Three Days of De Panne (Dutch: Driedaagse De Panne–Koksijde) was the 40th edition of the Three Days of De Panne cycling stage race. The race included four stages, two of which took place on the final day. It was rated as a 2.HC event in the 2016 UCI Europe Tour.

== Stages ==
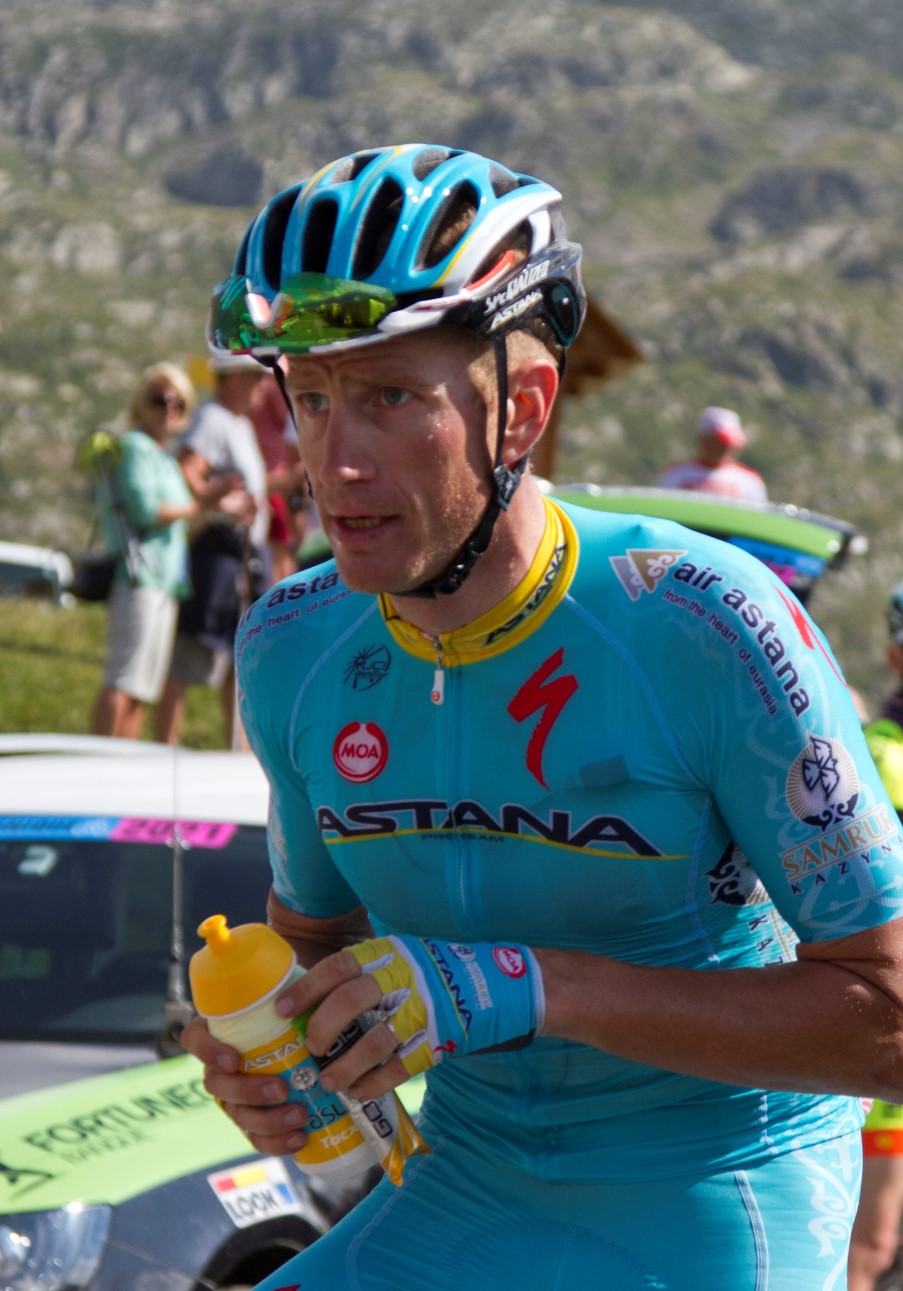
2016 Three Days of De Panne winner Lieuwe Westra (Astana)

The race includes four stages. The first three of these are road stages, while the fourth is an individual time trial.

Stage	Date	Course	Distance	Type	Winner
1	29 March	De Panne to Zottegem	198.2 km (123.2 mi)	Medium-mountain stage	Alexander Kristoff (NOR)
2	30 March	Zottegem	211.1 km (131.2 mi)	Hilly stage	Elia Viviani (ITA)
3a	31 March	De Panne	111.5 km (69.3 mi)	Flat stage	Marcel Kittel (GER)
3b	31 March	De Panne	14.2 km (9 mi)	Individual time trial	Maciej Bodnar (POL)
Total		535 km (332.4 mi)			

== Teams ==
22 teams took part in the 2016 Three Days of De Panne. 11 of these were UCI WorldTeams and the remaining 11 were UCI Professional Continental teams. Wanty–Groupe Gobert withdrew before the start of the race on Monday 28 March after the death of Antoine Demoitié in Gent–Wevelgem a day earlier.

UCI WorldTeams

- Astana
- BMC Racing Team
- Etixx–Quick-Step
- FDJ
- Team Katusha
- Lampre–Merida
- Lotto–Soudal
- Team Sky
- Tinkoff
- Cannondale
- Orica–GreenEDGE

UCI Professional Continental Teams

- Bardiani–CSF
- Bora–Argon 18
- Cofidis
- Direct Énergie
- Gazprom–RusVelo
- Nippo–Vini Fantini
- ONE Pro Cycling
- Roompot–Oranje Peloton
- Stölting Service Group
- Topsport Vlaanderen–Baloise
- Southeast–Venezuela

== Stages ==
=== Stage 1 ===
29 March 2016, De Panne to Zottegem, 198.2 km (123.2 mi)

Stage 1 result
Rank	Rider	Team	Time
1	Alexander Kristoff (NOR)	Team Katusha	4hr 22' 34"
2	Alexey Lutsenko (KAZ)	Astana	+ 0"
3	Lieuwe Westra (NED)	Astana	+ 0"
4	Mads Pedersen (DEN)	Stölting Service Group	+ 29"
5	Luke Rowe (GBR)	Team Sky	+ 29"
6	Pim Ligthart (NED)	Lotto–Soudal	+ 36"
7	Manuel Belletti (ITA)	Southeast–Venezuela	+ 36"
8	Juraj Sagan (SVK)	Tinkoff	+ 36"
9	Sean De Bie (BEL)	Lotto–Soudal	+ 36"
10	Marco Haller (AUT)	Team Katusha	+ 36"

General classification after stage 1
Rank	Rider	Team	Time
1	Alexander Kristoff (NOR)	Team Katusha	4hr 22' 24"
2	Alexey Lutsenko (KAZ)	Astana	+ 1"
3	Lieuwe Westra (NED)	Astana	+ 6"
4	Mads Pedersen (DEN)	Stölting Service Group	+ 39"
5	Luke Rowe (GBR)	Team Sky	+ 39"
6	Luke Durbridge (AUS)	Orica–GreenEDGE	+ 42"
7	Tony Martin (GER)	Etixx–Quick-Step	+ 44"
8	Rick Zabel (GER)	BMC Racing Team	+ 44"
9	Michael Mørkøv (DEN)	Team Katusha	+ 45"
10	Pim Ligthart (NED)	Lotto–Soudal	+ 46"

=== Stage 2 ===
30 March 2016, Zottegem to Koksijde, 211.1 km (131.2 mi)

Stage 2 result
Rank	Rider	Team	Time
1	Elia Viviani (ITA)	Team Sky	5hr 01' 04"
2	Marcel Kittel (GER)	Etixx–Quick-Step	+ 0"
3	Alexander Kristoff (NOR)	Team Katusha	+ 0"
4	Amaury Capiot (BEL)	Topsport Vlaanderen–Baloise	+ 0"
5	Adrien Petit (FRA)	Direct Énergie	+ 0"
6	Raymond Kreder (NED)	Roompot–Oranje Peloton	+ 0"
7	Paolo Simion (ITA)	Bardiani–CSF	+ 0"
8	Marc Sarreau (FRA)	FDJ	+ 0"
9	Erik Baška (SVK)	Tinkoff	+ 0"
10	Ivan Savitskiy (RUS)	Gazprom–RusVelo	+ 0"

General classification after stage 2
Rank	Rider	Team	Time
1	Alexander Kristoff (NOR)	Team Katusha	9hr 23' 24"
2	Alexey Lutsenko (KAZ)	Astana	+ 5"
3	Lieuwe Westra (NED)	Astana	+ 10"
4	Mads Pedersen (DEN)	Stölting Service Group	+ 43"
5	Bert Van Lerberghe (BEL)	Topsport Vlaanderen–Baloise	+ 45"
6	Luke Durbridge (AUS)	Orica–GreenEDGE	+ 46"
7	Rick Zabel (GER)	BMC Racing Team	+ 48"
8	Tony Martin (GER)	Etixx–Quick-Step	+ 48"
9	Michael Mørkøv (DEN)	Team Katusha	+ 49"
10	Amaury Capiot (BEL)	Topsport Vlaanderen–Baloise	+ 50"

=== Stage 3a ===
31 March 2016, De Panne to De Panne, 111.5 km (69.3 mi)

Stage 3a result
Rank	Rider	Team	Time
1	Marcel Kittel (GER)	Etixx–Quick-Step	2hr 27' 03"
2	Phil Bauhaus (GER)	Bora–Argon 18	+ 0"
3	Alexander Kristoff (NOR)	Team Katusha	+ 0"
4	Amaury Capiot (BEL)	Topsport Vlaanderen–Baloise	+ 0"
5	Luka Mezgec (SVN)	Orica–GreenEDGE	+ 0"
6	Marc Sarreau (FRA)	FDJ	+ 0"
7	Michael Van Staeyen (BEL)	Bardiani–CSF	+ 0"
8	Erik Baška (SVK)	Tinkoff	+ 0"
9	Raymond Kreder (NED)	Roompot–Oranje Peloton	+ 0"
10	Marko Kump (SVN)	Lampre–Merida	+ 0"

General classification after stage 3a
Rank	Rider	Team	Time
1	Alexander Kristoff (NOR)	Team Katusha	11hr 50' 25"
2	Alexey Lutsenko (KAZ)	Astana	+ 7"
3	Lieuwe Westra (NED)	Astana	+ 12"
4	Mads Pedersen (DEN)	Stölting Service Group	+ 45"
5	Bert Van Lerberghe (BEL)	Topsport Vlaanderen–Baloise	+ 47"
6	Luke Durbridge (AUS)	Orica–GreenEDGE	+ 48"
7	Rick Zabel (GER)	BMC Racing Team	+ 50"
8	Tony Martin (GER)	Etixx–Quick-Step	+ 50"
9	Michael Mørkøv (DEN)	Team Katusha	+ 51"
10	Amaury Capiot (BEL)	Topsport Vlaanderen–Baloise	+ 52"

=== Stage 3b ===
31 March 2016, De Panne to De Panne, 14.2 km (8.8 mi) (ITT)

Stage 3b result
Rank	Rider	Team	Time
1	Maciej Bodnar (POL)	Tinkoff–Saxo	17' 39"
2	Tony Martin (GER)	Etixx–Quick-Step	+ 0"
3	Tom Bohli (SUI)	BMC Racing Team	+ 0"
4	Lieuwe Westra (NED)	Astana	+ 3"
5	Johan Le Bon (FRA)	FDJ	+ 19"
6	Sylvain Chavanel (FRA)	Direct Énergie	+ 22"
7	Alexey Lutsenko (KAZ)	Astana	+ 24"
8	Alexander Kristoff (NOR)	Team Katusha	+ 28"
9	Stefan Küng (SUI)	BMC Racing Team	+ 29"
10	Luke Durbridge (AUS)	Orica–GreenEDGE	+ 31"

Final general classification
Rank	Rider	Team	Time
1	Lieuwe Westra (NED)	Astana	12hr 08' 19"
2	Alexander Kristoff (NOR)	Team Katusha	+ 13"
3	Alexey Lutsenko (KAZ)	Astana	+ 16"
4	Tony Martin (GER)	Etixx–Quick-Step	+ 35"
5	Sylvain Chavanel (FRA)	Direct Énergie	+ 59"
6	Luke Durbridge (AUS)	Orica–GreenEDGE	+ 1'04"
7	Stefan Küng (SUI)	BMC Racing Team	+ 1'06"
8	Mads Pedersen (DEN)	Stölting Service Group	+ 1'19"
9	Nils Politt (GER)	Team Katusha	+ 1'19"
10	Johan Le Bon (FRA)	FDJ	+ 1'19"

== Classification leadership table ==
Stage	Winner	General classification	Points classification	Mountains classification	Sprints classification	Team classification
1	Alexander Kristoff	Alexander Kristoff	Alexander Kristoff	Loïc Vliegen	Danny van Poppel	Astana
2	Elia Viviani	Alexander Kristoff	Alexander Kristoff	Loïc Vliegen	Danny van Poppel	Astana
3a	Marcel Kittel	Alexander Kristoff	Alexander Kristoff	Loïc Vliegen	Danny van Poppel	Astana
3b	Maciej Bodnar	Lieuwe Westra	Alexander Kristoff	Loïc Vliegen	Danny van Poppel	Astana
Final		Lieuwe Westra	Alexander Kristoff	Loïc Vliegen	Danny van Poppel	Astana
