= 2008 Tro-Bro Léon =

Race details
- Dates: 20 April 2008
- Stages: 1
- Distance: 193.1 km (120.0 mi)
- Winning time: 4h 37' 18"

Results
	Winner	Frédéric Guesdon (FRA)
	Second	Maxim Gourov (KAZ)
	Third	Julien Belgy (FRA)

The 2008 Tro-Bro Léon was the 25th edition of the Tro-Bro Léon cycle race and was held on 20 April 2008. The race was won by Frédéric Guesdon.

== General classification ==
Final general classification

Rank	Rider	Time
1	Frédéric Guesdon (FRA)	4h 37' 18"
2	Maxim Gourov (KAZ)	+ 1"
3	Julien Belgy (FRA)	+ 45"
4	Lilian Jégou (FRA)	+ 48"
5	Gabriel Rasch (NOR)	+ 48"
6	Jean-Luc Delpech (FRA)	+ 48"
7	Cédric Coutouly (FRA)	+ 48"
8	Florent Brard (FRA)	+ 48"
9	Benoît Sinner (FRA)	+ 57"
10	Yauheni Hutarovich (BLR)	+ 1' 30"
