= Florent Brard =

French cyclist (born 1976)

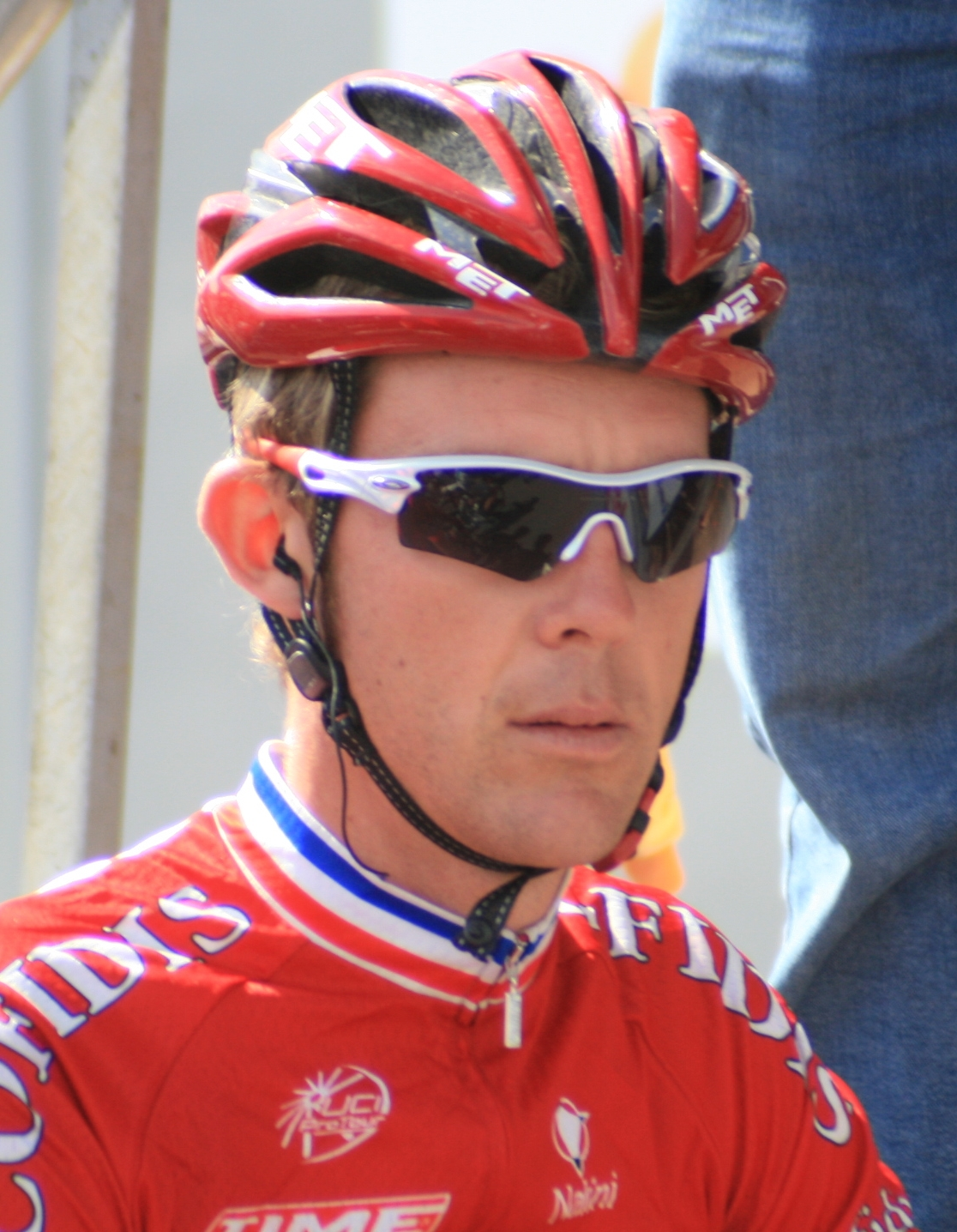
- Brard in 2008

Personal information
- Full name: Florent Brard
- Born: 7 February 1976 (age 50) Chambray-lès-Tours, France
- Height: 1.87 m (6 ft 2 in)
- Weight: 74 kg (163 lb)

Cycling career
- Sport: Cycling
- Discipline: Road
- Role: Rider

Professional teams
- 1998: Mattei
- 1999–2001: Festina–Lotus
- 2002: Crédit Agricole
- 2003–2004: Vlaanderen–T Interim
- 2005: Agritubel–Loudun
- 2006–2007: Caisse d'Epargne–Illes Balears
- 2008–2009: Cofidis

Major wins
- French National Road Race Champion (2006)

Florent Brard (born 7 February 1976) is a French former road bicycle racer. He won three national championships, including the professional road race. He became a professional in 1999 and stopped racing in November 2009 after not finding a place in a team.

== Childhood ==
Florent Brard was born into a cycling family. His father bought two copies of cycling magazines, one to read and the other to save, untouched.

== Early career ==
Florent Brard raced as an amateur as a member of the Cercle Paul-Bert in the Tours region of France. He won the national youth pursuit championship in 1992 and 1993 and the junior pursuit in 1994. He tried professional racing as a stagiaire, or apprentice, with the Française des Jeux team in 1997, riding at the Élite 2 level. From there he moved to next year as a full professional to Festina.

== Professional career ==
Brard showed from his youth that he had a talent for long, lone efforts and for riding a large gear for long periods. He said: "I've ridden a lot on the track during the course of my career. The pursuit is an excellent school for progressing on the road. So I'm a fairly good rouleur and that's, therefore, the talent that I try to exploit to make an impression." That brought him his first win as a professional, the last stage of the Étoile de Bessèges on 11 February 2001. He won alone after being in a breakaway group close to being caught by the main field after 120 km. He said: "It would have been just too stupid to miss the chance a kilometer from the finish. My legs hurt, I was cooked, but I gritted my teeth and threw my last force into the battle." He won the national time-trial championship later the same year and he won a stage in and led the Tour de l'Avenir. He also won Paris–Bourges and GP-Cholet-Pays de la Loire.

He moved to Crédit Agricole in 2002, earning 30,500 euros a season but he was fired after starting the season poorly, then missing the middle following a fall which broke vertebrae finally being caught in a drugs test [See below.]. Only the small Marlux team in Belgium offered him a place for 2003. He said: "When I signed for them I wasn't at all happy because, when you come from big teams like Festina and Crédit d'Agricole, which have a prominent image, it's strange, I had the impression of going backward in my career. I went there on tiptoe, not knowing what I was going to find, and then I felt fine."

In 2004, he stayed in Belgium with the Chocolade Jacques, team. He had tried to ride again with French teams "but their sponsor didn't want a doped rider."[See below.] He won the final stage of the Giro di Lucca and the second stage of Paris–Corrèze

In 2005, with Agritubel, he won Paris–Troyes, the Trophée Luc Leblanc, and a stage at the Circuit de la Sarthe.

In 2006, he moved to Caisse d'Epargne-Illes Balears, with whom he rode the Tour de France after winning the national road championship at Chantonnay a week before the start. He said: "When you've been down at the bottom [See below] you appreciate the heights even more." He spent the rest of the year racing and training in his blue, white, and red jersey. "You only have it until the following June," he said, so he wore it when he could.

He did not finish the Tour de France, falling during the penultimate stage.

== Doping ==
Florent Brard was prescribed corticoid to recover from a crash in the Grand Prix du Midi Libre. He said he had seen his doctor "n times" (pour la énième fois) and neither he nor the doctor thought of him as a racing cyclist, "only as a man broken everywhere who couldn't do anything because of all his sleepless nights." and was caught in a dope test in the Tour de l'Ain, which he finished an hour behind the winner. He was suspended for nine months by the Fédération Française de Cyclisme. His sponsor, Crédit Agricole, fired him. He said:

I think it's fair to say that that long period allowed me to change the way I looked at life. Until then, for me, the professionals were gods. Now, when I see a sportsman, I see the man. The status of the champion isn't enough. A champion can be a good guy as much as a bad one.

He rode then for Belgian teams because, he said, Roger Legeay, his former boss at Crédit Agricole, was president of AC2000. "He knew that I was in touch with Agritubel; he said to a meeting of AC2000, 'If a French team takes on a former dope-taker, we'll throw it out of the association.'"

== Personal life ==
Brard is married to Nathalie, with whom he has two daughters. In 2006 they moved to Serres-Castet, near the Pyrenees, to profit from better weather for training than in the Loire valley around Tours and to improve his riding in the mountains.

== Major results ==
1994
2nd Road race, National Junior Road Championships
1998
3rd Paris–Troyes
2000
5th Grand Prix de Plumelec-Morbihan
2001
1st Time trial, National Road Championships
1st Paris–Bourges
1st Cholet-Pays de Loire
1st Joseph Voegeli Memorial (with Christophe Moreau)
1st Stage 5 Étoile de Bessèges
2nd Overall Tour de l'Avenir
3rd Grand Prix d'Ouverture La Marseillaise
3rd Châteauroux Classic
4th Overall Tour du Limousin
5th Grand Prix des Nations
7th Overall Critérium International
7th Grand Prix de Rennes
10th Tour du Haut Var
Tour de France

Held after Prologue, Stage 1 & Stages 3–4

2003
2nd Paris–Bourges
2004
1st Stage 2 Paris–Corrèze
1st Stage 4 Giro della Provincia di Lucca
6th Overall Tour de Pologne
6th Châteauroux Classic
2005
1st Paris–Troyes
1st Trophée Luc Leblanc
1st Stage 2b (ITT) Circuit de la Sarthe
5th Route Adélie de Vitré
7th Paris–Roubaix
7th Tour du Haut Var
2006
1st Road race, National Road Championships
2007
5th Paris–Camembert
7th Duo Normand (with Nicolas Fritsch)
2008
5th Grand Prix de la Somme
8th Tro-Bro Léon
