= Koen Barbé =

Belgian cyclist

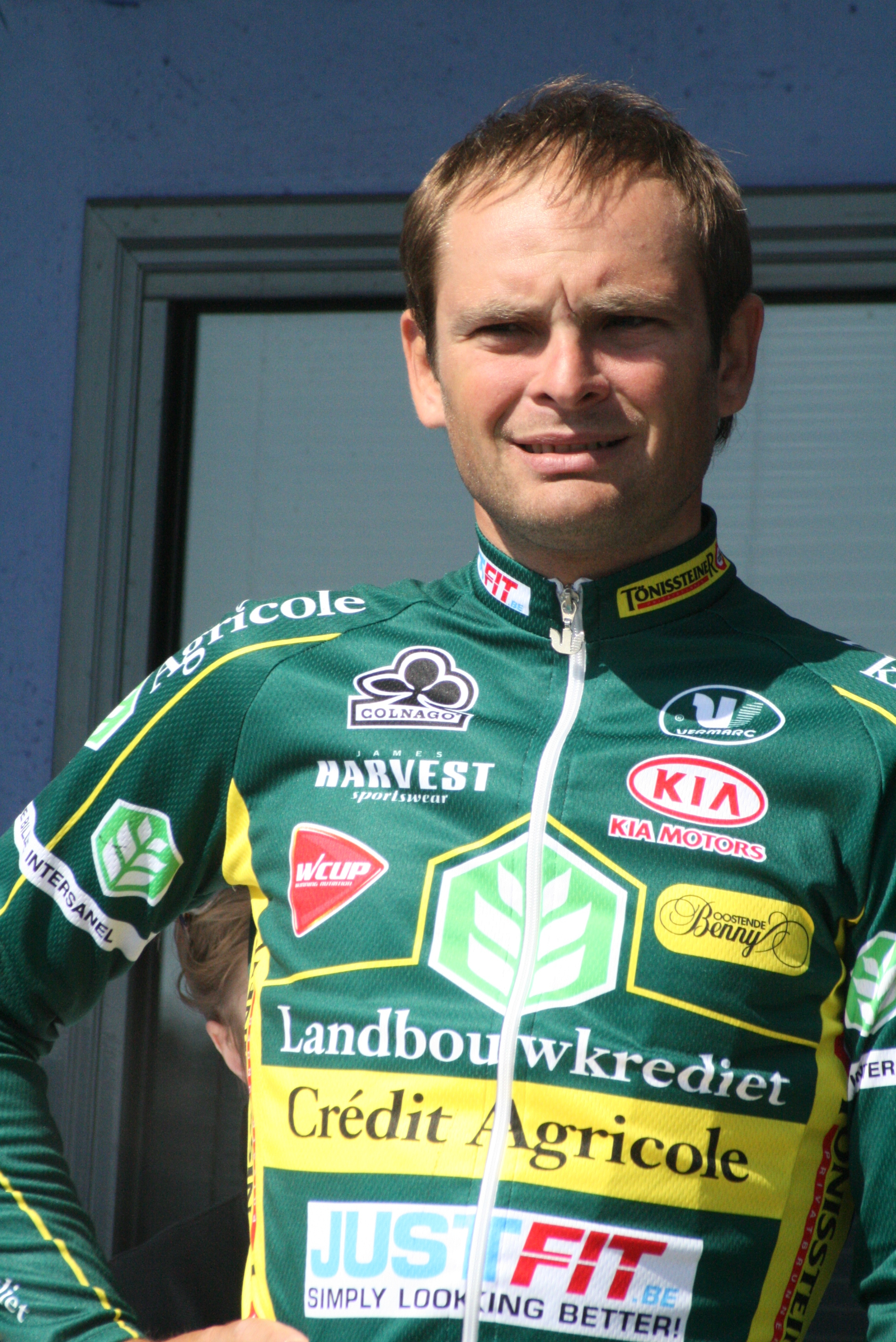
- Barbé at the 2011 Four Days of Dunkirk.

Personal information
- Full name: Koen Barbé
- Born: 20 January 1981 (age 45) Zottegem, Belgium
- Height: 1.82 m (6 ft 0 in)
- Weight: 75 kg (165 lb)

Cycling career
- Sport: Cycling
- Current team: Retired
- Discipline: Road
- Role: Rider

Professional teams
- 2004–2008: Vlaanderen–T Interim
- 2009–2013: Landbouwkrediet–Colnago

Koen Barbé (born 20 January 1981) is a Belgian former professional road bicycle racer, who competed as a professional between 2004 and 2013, for the Topsport Vlaanderen and Crelan–Euphony teams.

Barbe retired at the end of the 2013 season, after ten years as a professional.

== Major results ==
2003
1st Road race, National Under-23 Road Championships
2nd Kattekoers
2004
4th Flèche Hesbignonne
5th Omloop van het Waasland
2005 (1 pro win)
1st GP Rudy Dhaenens
3rd Leeuwse Pijl
4th Brussel–Ingooigem
2006
2nd Omloop van het Waasland
4th Omloop Het Volk
2007
1st GP Paul Borremans
2008
7th Overall Driedaagse van West-Vlaanderen
10th Internationale Wielertrofee Jong Maar Moedig
2010
2nd Internationale Wielertrofee Jong Maar Moedig
2011
4th Omloop Het Nieuwsblad Beloften
4th Internationale Wielertrofee Jong Maar Moedig
2012
1st Memorial Fred De Bruyne
1st Stan Ockers Classic
2013
1st GP Paul Borremans
7th Antwerpse Havenpijl
10th Tro-Bro Léon
