= Jean-Patrick Nazon =

French cyclist

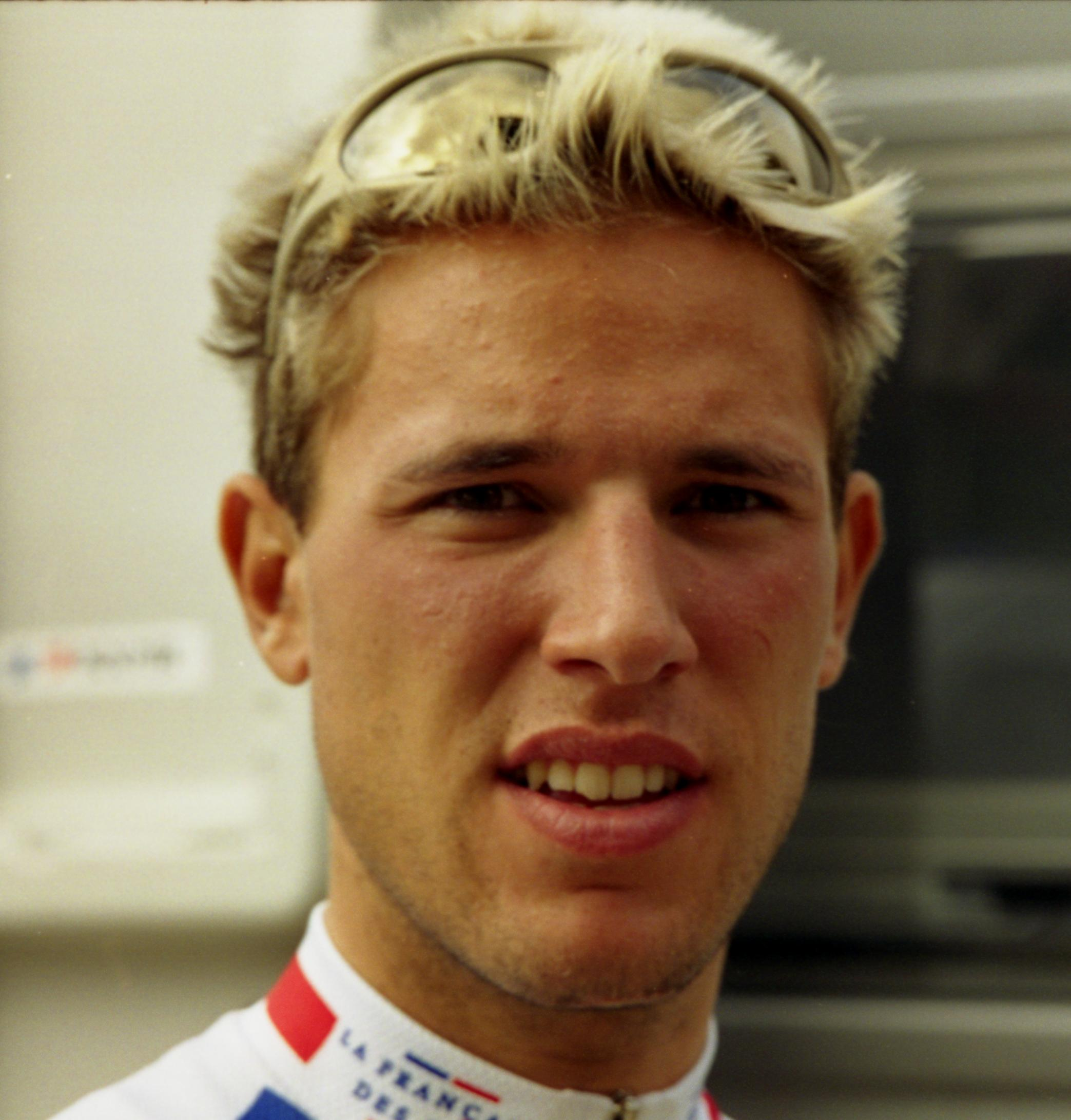

Personal information
- Full name: Jean-Patrick Nazon
- Born: January 18, 1977 (age 49) Épinal, France
- Height: 1.82 m (6 ft 0 in)
- Weight: 74 kg (163 lb)

Cycling career
- Sport: Cycling
- Discipline: Road
- Role: Rider
- Rider type: Sprinter

Professional teams
- 1997–2002: Française des Jeux
- 2003: Jean Delatour
- 2004–2008: AG2R Prévoyance

Major wins
- Grand Tours Tour de France 2 individual stages (2003, 2004) One-day races and Classics Memorial Rik Van Steenbergen (2005)

Jean-Patrick Nazon (born 18 January 1977, in Épinal) is a French former professional road bicycle racer who turned professional in 1997. He is the brother of former racing cyclist Damien Nazon.

== Major results ==
1998
6th Overall Circuit de Lorraine

1st Stages 3 & 7

10th Paris–Tours
1999
7th Memorial Rik Van Steenbergen
9th Tro-Bro Léon
2000
Étoile de Bessèges

1st Stages 2 & 5

1st Stage 3a Tour de Picardie
1st Stage 3 Four Days of Dunkirk
9th Tro-Bro Léon
2001
1st Stage 2 Tour de l'Avenir
2002
1st Stage Critérium International
1st Stage Four Days of Dunkirk
4th Grand Prix de Denain
6th Overall Tour of Belgium
7th Memorial Rik Van Steenbergen
8th Overall Guldensporentweedaagse
10th Overall Étoile de Bessèges
2003
Tour de France

1st Stage 20 (Champs-Élysées)
Held after Stage 3

Volta ao Alentejo

1st Stages 3 & 6

1st Stage 6 Four Days of Dunkirk
4th Classic Haribo
2004
1st Stage 3 Tour de France
1st Stage 1 Critérium International
1st Stage 3 Tour de l'Ain
4th Overall Tour of Qatar
7th Châteauroux Classic
2005
1st Memorial Rik Van Steenbergen
1st Stage 1 Hessen–Rundfahrt
1st Stage 2 Bayern Rundfahrt
3rd Châteauroux Classic
3rd Paris–Brussels
3rd Grand Prix de Fourmies
2006
1st Stage 1 Circuit de Lorraine
1st Stage 2 Route du Sud
3rd Tro-Bro Léon
2007
1st Stage 1 Paris–Nice
1st Stage 1 Route du Sud
2nd Omloop van de Vlaamse Scheldeboorden
8th Grand Prix de Denain
