= Nadir Haddou =

French cyclist

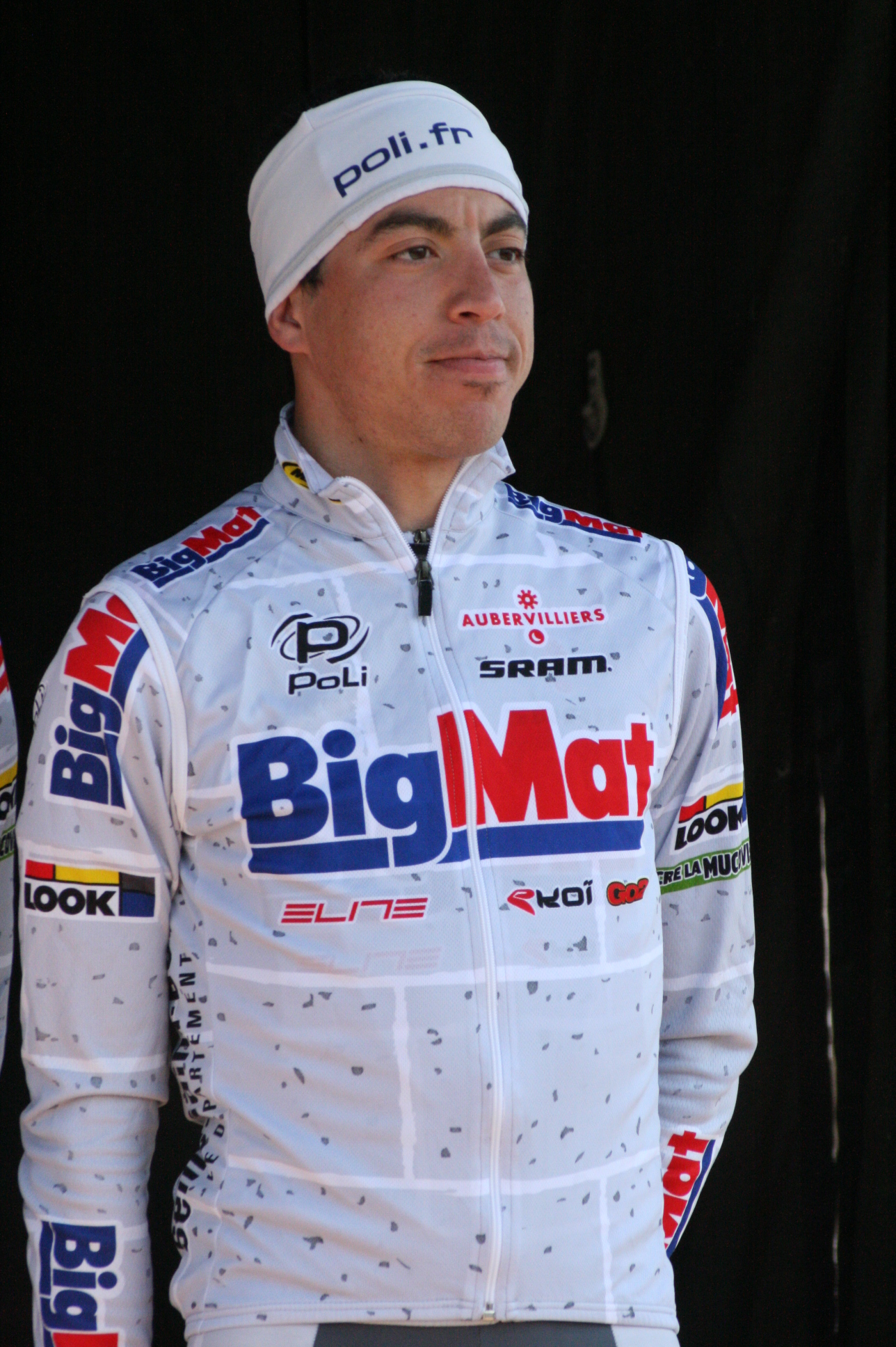
- Haddou in 2010

Personal information
- Full name: Nadir Haddou
- Born: 25 October 1983 (age 42) Issy les Moulineaux, France

Cycling career
- Sport: Cycling
- Discipline: Road
- Role: Rider
- Rider type: Sprinter

Professional team
- 2009–2010: Auber 93

Nadir Haddou (born 25 October 1983 in Issy les Moulineaux) is a French former professional road bicycle racer. He is the younger brother of cyclist Saïd Haddou.

== Major results ==
2009
2nd Paris–Troyes
3rd Grand Prix de la Somme
9th Tro-Bro Léon
9th Overall Ronde de l'Oise
2010
1st Stage 2 Ronde de l'Oise
4th Paris–Troyes
8th Grand Prix de la Ville de Lillers
9th Paris–Bourges
