= Ludovic Capelle =

Belgian cyclist (born 1976)

Personal information
- Full name: Ludovic Capelle
- Born: 27 February 1976 (age 50) Belgium

Cycling career
- Sport: Cycling
- Current team: Retired
- Discipline: Road
- Role: Rider

Professional teams
- 1998–2000: Home Market–Ville de Charleroi
- 2001–2002: AG2R Prévoyance
- 2003–2005: Landbouwkrediet–Colnago
- 2007: Roubaix–Lille Métropole
- 2008: Rietumu Banka–Riga
- 2009: Continental Team Differdange

Major wins
- Scheldeprijs Vlaanderen (2003); Dwars door Vlaanderen (2004); Grand Prix d'Isbergues (2004)

Ludovic Capelle (born 27 February 1976 in Namur) is a Belgian former professional road racing cyclist. He was professional from 1998 until 2009, riding for Ville de Charleroi–New Systems (1998–2000), AG2R Prévoyance (2001–2002), Landbouwkrediet–Colnago (2003–2005), Roubaix–Lille Métropole (2007), Rietumu Banka–Riga (2008) and Continental Team Differdange (2009). He rode the 2001 Tour de France and recorded victories at Scheldeprijs Vlaanderen (2003), Dwars door Vlaanderen (2004) and Grand Prix d'Isbergues (2004).

== Major results ==
1995
1st Stage 2 Tour de Namur
1996
1st Ronde van Vlaanderen U23
1997
1st Kampioenschap van Vlaanderen Gits (Amateurs)
1st Ronde van Vlaanderen U23
1st Stage 3 Tour de Liège
1998
1st Stage 2 Tour de Wallonie
1999
1st Stage 4 Tour de la Somme
1st Stage 3 Tour de Wallonie
2000
1st Tour de la Haute-Sambre
2001
1st Road race, National Road Championships
2002
1st Stage 1 Circuit de la Sarthe
2003
1st Scheldeprijs Vlaanderen
2004
1st Dwars door Vlaanderen
1st Grand Prix d'Isbergues
1st Stage 5 Tour du Poitou-Charentes

== See also ==
- List of doping cases in cycling
