= Saïd Haddou =

French cyclist (1982–2026)

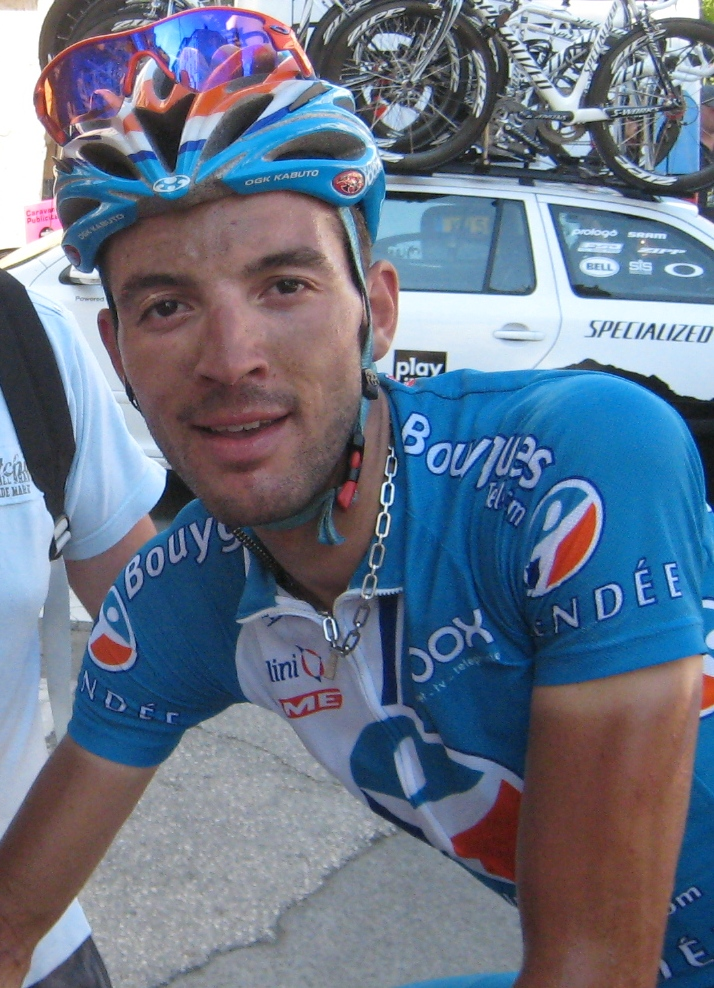
- Haddou in 2009

Personal information
- Born: 23 November 1982 Issy-les-Moulineaux, France
- Died: 22 June 2026 (aged 43) Marseille, France
- Height: 1.90 m (6 ft 3 in)
- Weight: 80 kg (176 lb)

Cycling career
- Sport: Cycling
- Discipline: Road
- Role: Rider

Amateur teams
- 2002: France Poursuite
- 2003: BigMat–Auber 93 (stagiaire)
- 2004: France Piste

Professional teams
- 2005–2006: Auber 93
- 2007–2012: Bouygues Télécom

Major wins
- Tro-Bro Léon (2007, 2009)

Saïd Haddou (23 November 1982 – 22 June 2026) was a French professional road bicycle racer, who last rode for UCI Professional Continental team Team Europcar.

== Major victories ==
In 2007, and 2009, he won Tro-Bro Léon.

== Personal life and death ==
Haddou was the brother of Nadir Haddou, who is also a cyclist.

Saïd Haddou died in a traffic collision on the A50 autoroute at Marseille, on 22 June 2026, at the age of 43.

== Competition results ==
2004
1st La Côte Picarde
1st Stage 4 Boucles de la Mayenne
2005
1st Stage 4 Tour de Gironde
7th GP de Denain
2006
1st Stage 1 Tour du Poitou-Charentes
2007
1st Tro-Bro Léon
2nd Boucles de l'Aulne
4th GP de Denain
5th Paris–Bourges
2009
1st Tro-Bro Léon
2011
1st Stage 5 Étoile de Bessèges
5th Châteauroux Classic
2012
1st Tallinn–Tartu GP
10th Tour de Vendée

Grand Tour general classification results timeline

Grand Tour	2009
Giro d'Italia	158
Tour de France	140
Vuelta a España	—

Legend
—	Did not compete
DNF	Did not finish
