= 2011 Cofidis season =

Cofidis
- 2011 season
- UCI code: COF
- Status: UCI Professional Continental
- Manager: Éric Boyer
- Main sponsor(s): Cofidis
- Based: France

Season victories
- One-day races: 2
- Stage race overall: 3
- Stage race stages: 12
- National Championships: 1
- Most wins: Samuel Dumoulin & David Moncoutié (6 wins each)

The 2011 season for the Cofidis cycling team began in January at the Grand Prix d'Ouverture La Marseillaise and ended in October at Paris–Tours. Cofidis was a UCI Professional Continental team in 2011, meaning they had to be proactively selected by the organizers of UCI World Tour events, including each of the season's Grand Tours, if they were to compete.

The team's most successful rider in 2011 was David Moncoutié. The veteran Frenchman won the Tour Méditerranéen and Tour de l'Ain overall crowns, as well as successes in the Vuelta a España. Moncoutié took a stage win and the King of the Mountains, each for the fourth straight year (a new record for the mountains title). Sprinter Samuel Dumoulin was also a prolific winner, winning six races.

== 2011 roster ==
Ages as of 1 January 2011.

Rider	Date of birth
Yohann Bagot (FRA)	6 September 1987 (aged 23)
Florent Barle (FRA)	17 January 1986 (aged 24)
Mickaël Buffaz (FRA)	21 May 1979 (aged 31)
Rémi Cusin (FRA)	3 February 1986 (aged 24)
Romain Delalot (Note: Rider joined the team on 1 August as a stagiaire.) (FRA)	18 April 1991 (aged 19)
Samuel Dumoulin (FRA)	20 August 1980 (aged 30)
Leonardo Duque (COL)	10 April 1980 (aged 30)
Nicolas Edet (FRA)	2 December 1987 (aged 23)
Julien El Fares (FRA)	1 June 1985 (aged 25)
Jean Eudes Demaret (FRA)	25 July 1984 (aged 26)
Julien Fouchard (FRA)	20 June 1986 (aged 24)
Tony Gallopin (FRA)	24 May 1988 (aged 22)
Kevyn Ista (BEL)	22 November 1984 (aged 26)
Jens Keukeleire (BEL)	23 November 1988 (aged 22)

Rider	Date of birth
Kalle Kriit (EST)	13 November 1983 (aged 27)
Arnaud Labbe (FRA)	3 November 1976 (aged 34)
Antoine Lavieu (FRA)	28 September 1990 (aged 20)
Luis Maté (ESP)	23 March 1984 (aged 26)
Rudy Molard (FRA)	17 September 1989 (aged 21)
David Moncoutié (FRA)	30 April 1975 (aged 35)
Damien Monier (FRA)	27 August 1982 (aged 28)
Adrien Petit (FRA)	26 September 1990 (aged 20)
Aleksejs Saramotins (LAT)	8 April 1982 (aged 28)
Nico Sijmens (BEL)	1 April 1978 (aged 32)
Rein Taaramäe (EST)	24 April 1987 (aged 23)
Tristan Valentin (FRA)	23 February 1982 (aged 28)
Nicolas Vogondy (FRA)	8 August 1977 (aged 33)
Romain Zingle (BEL)	29 January 1987 (aged 23)

Riders who joined the team for the 2011 season

Rider	2010 team
Yohann Bagot	stagiaire (Cofidis)
Florent Barle	neo-pro
Nicolas Edet	stagiaire (Cofidis)
Luis Maté	Androni Giocattoli
Adrien Petit	stagiaire (Cofidis)
Aleksejs Saramotins	Team HTC–Columbia
Nicolas Vogondy	Bbox Bouygues Telecom

Riders who left the team during or after the 2010 season

Rider	2011 team
Guillaume Blot	Bretagne–Schuller
Christophe Kern	Team Europcar
Sébastien Minard	Ag2r–La Mondiale
Amaël Moinard	BMC Racing Team
Rémi Pauriol	FDJ

== One-day races ==
The team was active in races which preceded those known as "classics" and the traditional start of the spring season. At the Grand Prix d'Ouverture la Marseillaise, held in January as the first race of the season in France, El Fares rode to tenth place by finishing in the main field behind the solo winner. In February, Gallopin was the team's best finisher at two of the races in the Vuelta a Mallorca series, coming ninth at the unofficial Trofeo Palma de Mallorca and tenth at the Trofeo Inca.

=== Spring classics ===
Duque took a high placing at the Gran Premio dell'Insubria-Lugano, finishing just off the podium in fourth place, coming home in a group that trailed two leading riders. At Kuurne–Brussels–Kuurne, a race which included most of the sport's top teams, Petit finished ninth in a field sprint finish at the front of the race. Ista narrowly missed out on a victory at Le Samyn in early March. The race's top finishers came across the finish line scattered, in groups of eight or fewer. Ista finished second, alone, 8 seconds back of solo winner Dominic Klemme. Two weeks later, Keukeilere finished fourth in a sprint at Nokere Koerse. Gallopin finished on the podium at Cholet-Pays de Loire. Team Europcar's Thomas Voeckler won the race with a late attack, with the peloton coming so close to catching him at the finish line that there was no time gap. Gallopin was first from the peloton for second overall. Vogondy rode to fourth place at the Route Adélie de Vitré, just missing the podium after figuring into a winning breakaway.

The team picked up their first single-day win the same day as the more prestigious Tour of Flanders, in which they participated but were not especially competitive, with Duque in 19th their best finisher. The race they won was the inaugural Flèche d'Emeraude, a new race in the UCI Europe Tour and the French Road Cycling Cup. Gallopin came first at the head of a field sprint in Saint-Malo. Zingle figured into a winning breakaway at the Brabantse Pijl, the precursor to the Ardennes classics. He took seventh place, a minute and a half back of the winner Philippe Gilbert. Vogondy was sixth at the Tour du Finistère, finishing with a big main group behind two leaders.

Demaret took the team's second single-day win at the Tartu GP in late May. He was the best of a five-rider breakaway at the front of the race, one which included teammate Taaramäe. That same day, Gallopin took sixth in a sprint finish to the Grand Prix de Plumelec-Morbihan. The team's last race of the early season was Halle–Ingooigem in June, where Sijmens rode to ninth place.

The team was not especially competitive at the spring season's monument classics, coming in 37th at Milan–San Remo, 19th at the Tour of Flanders, 29th at Paris–Roubaix, and 57th at Liège–Bastogne–Liège. The team also sent squads to the Trofeo Laigueglia, Omloop Het Nieuwsblad, Gran Premio di Lugano, Les Boucles du Sud Ardèche, Dwars door Vlaanderen, E3 Prijs Vlaanderen – Harelbeke, Gent–Wevelgem, Scheldeprijs, Paris–Camembert, the Grand Prix de Denain, the Amstel Gold Race, Tro-Bro Léon, La Flèche Wallonne, the Eschborn–Frankfurt City Loop, and the Tallinn-Tartu GP, but finished no higher than 12th in any of these races.

=== Fall races ===
The team secured several high placings in the later season, but did not obtain any victories. In late July, the team took two of the top six placings at the Polynormande, with El Fares in second and Gallopin in sixth. El Fares had been part of a breakaway, and Gallopin first from the peloton four and a half minutes back. The result put Gallopin into the lead in the French Road Cycling Cup, the year-long competition among French single-day races where French riders, and those on French teams, can earn points. Cusin came eighth at the Tour du Doubs in September. Petit just missed out on the podium at the Grand Prix de Fourmies, finishing fourth in a large field sprint. He made the podium in a similar finish at Binche–Tournai–Binche in October, finishing third. Also in October, Dumoulin took ninth place at Paris–Bourges, from a selective sprint of ten riders. Duque was seventh in a leading group of thirteen at the Grand Prix de la Somme. Though he won only the one race, Gallopin's consistent high finishes in the French single-day races made him the overall victor of the season-long French Road Cycling Cup, which he clinched after the Tour de Vendée.

The team sent squads to the Châteauroux Classic, the GP Ouest-France, Paris–Brussels, the Grand Prix Cycliste de Québec, the Grand Prix Cycliste de Montréal, the Grand Prix de Wallonie, the Tour de Vendée, and Paris–Tours, but finished no higher than 11th in any of these races.

== Stage races ==
The team got their first win of the season, in their first stage race, at the Étoile de Bessèges. Dumoulin made a late selection in stage 3, joining nine other riders who finished just ahead of the rest of the peloton, and won the sprint to the finish line. Later in February, Moncoutié won the queen stage of the Tour Méditerranéen, finishing at Mont Faron. He had previously won stages there in 2003 and 2009, but his win this year was enough to win him the race overall thanks to his time gap. The squad also won the teams classification. Dumoulin took another win later in February, in the first stage of the two-day Tour du Haut Var. He stayed latched onto Rinaldo Nocentini's wheel during the stage's final climb, and came around him in the sprint.

Taaramäe took fourth overall at Paris–Nice in March, winning the youth classification with this performance, which was easily the strongest for an Estonian rider in the event's history. Taaramäe turned in a similar strong ride at the two-day, three-stage Critérium International, finishing on the event's final podium in third place, and securing the youth classification. At the concurrent Volta a Catalunya, Dumoulin took two stage wins. The first was in stage 5, on an uphill false flat finish which Dumoulin felt suited him well. The second was more unexpected, in that it was a dead flat run in to the finish on wide roads, a more traditional field sprint. Dumoulin was delighted to win twice in front of some of the sport's biggest stars, and stated that his next goal would be a major spring classic, perhaps the Amstel Gold Race. Dumoulin, however, was not a factor at the Amstel, finishing 104th, over eight minutes behind the winner.

In June, Maté won the final stage at the Route du Sud, coming best in a five-man breakaway sprint. Keukeleire, a prolific winner in his neo-pro season of 2010 but shut out in the first several months of 2011, took his first win of the year in July at the Tour of Austria. He won a selective sprint at the end of stage 3, finishing at the head of a 23-rider group that included the race's top riders. It was also in that stage that Edet took the lead in the mountains classification. He went on to win it at the end of the race, holding off Skil–Shimano's Alexandre Geniez by a single point.

The team took several wins in August. Dumoulin took a win in the first stage of Paris–Corrèze, breaking away near the end of the day to finish 4 seconds better than the main field. By finishing in the front group the next day, he secured overall victory in the two-day event. On the same day Dumoulin secured Paris–Corrèze, Cusin narrowly defeated Saxo Bank–SunGard's Matti Breschel at the end of stage 2 at the Tour of Denmark. After laying 28 seconds down in the overall classification before the final day at the Tour de l'Ain, Moncoutié secured overall victory the next day. He missed out on the stage win to FDJ's Thibaut Pinot, but by finishing only 3 seconds back he moved past previous race leader Wout Poels to win the event itself. Lastly, Gallopin took a stage at the Tour du Limousin. He took his second win of the season by breaking away from the peloton within stage's final kilometer, and holding on for first by 6 seconds.

The team also sent squads to the Volta ao Algarve, Three Days of West Flanders, the Circuit de la Sarthe, the Presidential Cycling Tour of Turkey, Four Days of Dunkirk, the Circuit de Lorraine, the Tour of Belgium, the Critérium du Dauphiné, the Tour of Slovenia, the Eneco Tour, the Tour du Poitou Charentes, and Circuit Franco-Belge, but did not obtain a stage win, classification win, or podium finish in any of them.

== Grand Tours ==
As a Professional Continental team, Cofidis needed to be selected by the organizers of any of the Grand Tours in order to participate. They were selected to ride the Tour de France and the Vuelta a España, but not the Giro d'Italia.

=== Tour de France ===
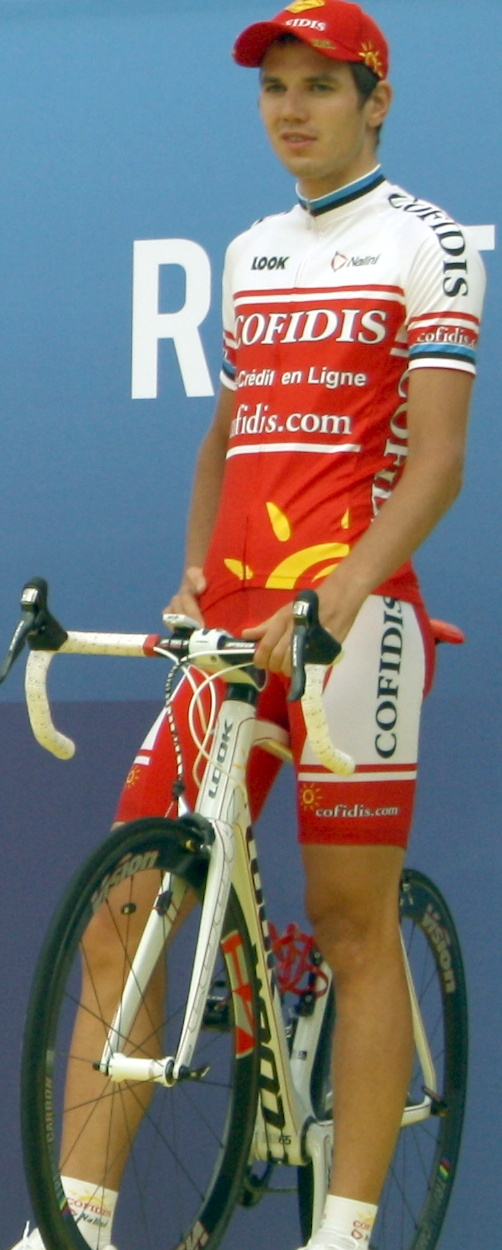
Former Estonian national champion Rein Taaramäe was Cofidis' best finisher in the Tour de France, coming in 12th just a few seconds shy of winning the best young rider white jersey.

The Amaury Sport Organisation announced the wildcard entries to the Tour de France in January, much earlier in than in past years. Cofidis, who had participated in the Tour every year of their existence, were among the four teams added to the 18 UCI ProTeams obligated to attend. After not racing the Tour in 2010 and indicating at the time that he may not return to it, Moncoutié decided instead to ride the 2011 Tour with hopes of winning the King of the Mountains title. The decision put a bit of doubt to his potential return to the Vuelta a España, notwithstanding the team needing a wildcard for that race as well, in spite of his three-year string of winning the mountains classification at that race. Taaramäe, Dumoulin, El Fares, and Vogondy were also named to the squad.

Taaramäe finished near the front of the race on stage 1 atop the short Mont des Alouettes hill. He was distanced by stage winner Philippe Gilbert and eventual Tour de France winner Cadel Evans, but finished with the main front group six seconds back for eighth on the day. The team had a very poor team time trial, coming in 21st. They were second to last, ahead of Euskaltel–Euskadi, who are renowned for having weak time trialists on their roster, and only by 2 seconds. The result dropped Taaramäe down to 66th place. The squad was mostly quiet in the first half of the Tour, with Gallopin taking fourth in a field sprint to finish stage 5 and Dumoulin tenth in stage 10 their best finishes.

On stage 13 into Lourdes, which included a passage over the hors catégorie climb Col d'Aubisque, Moncoutié figured into a ten-man breakaway. Given the lack of overall threat in the group, the peloton did not mount a serious chase, meaning the stage winner would come from this group of ten. FDJ's Jérémy Roy broke away from the group on the way up the climb. Moncoutié strenuously chased him, with Thor Hushovd following behind. The other breakaway riders all faded, finishing five minutes back on the stage. Roy crested the Aubisque first, and Moncoutié second. Hushovd, a rider known as a very strong descender, caught up with Moncoutié on the way down the Aubisque. With a short flat section still to race after the descent, Moncoutié and Hushovd worked cohesively as a chase group behind Roy. They caught and passed Roy 3 km (1.9 mi) from the end of the stage, and Hushovd eventually dropped Moncoutié as well to be the solo stage winner; Moncoutié finished second and Roy third. Moncoutié was roundly criticized by the French press for collaborating with Hushovd in the chase, with Roy (a fellow Frenchman) up the road. To that point in the Tour, no French rider had yet won a stage. Team manager Boyer defended Moncoutié, saying Hushovd was likely to surpass Roy and win any sprint at the end of the stage no matter what, and by working with him Moncoutié assured himself second place rather than falling to third.

Taaramäe took over the white jersey for best young rider from Rigoberto Urán on stage 18. Urán finished a distant 27th on the day, seven minutes off the pace of stage winner Andy Schleck. Taaramäe's eighth place, three minutes back of Schleck but four minutes the better of Urán, moved him into 11th place overall and into the best young rider's position, by 33 seconds over Pierre Rolland. Rolland won the stage at Alpe d'Huez the next day, with Taaramäe finishing 14th two minutes back. This gave Rolland an advantage of a minute and 33 seconds going into the stage 20 individual time trial, where Taaramäe's skills are superior. Taaramäe indeed finished better than Rolland in the time trial, tenth to Rolland's 21st, but gained only 48 seconds. This was insufficient to win back the white jersey before the final, largely ceremonial stage into Paris on the Tour's final day. Taaramäe finished the Tour in 12th place overall, at a deficit of eleven and a half minutes to Tour champion Cadel Evans. Moncoutié was not a major factor in any classification, finishing 41st overall and 25th in the mountains classification. Given his result at just 24 years of age, and that he retains eligibility for the white jersey in the 2012 Tour de France, Boyer expressed that he was quite pleased with Taaramäe's performance, and that he expected the Estonian to be a contender for the overall podium at the Tour within two or three years.

=== Vuelta a España ===
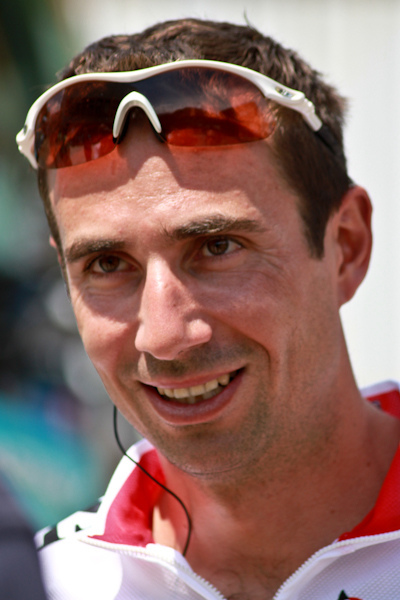
Team leader David Moncoutié considered not returning to the Vuelta a España, but did so and won both a stage and the mountains classification for the fourth year in a row.

Cofidis was one of the four wildcard entries to the Vuelta a España. After a disappointing Tour de France, Moncoutié decided to ride the Vuelta in hopes of capturing his fourth consecutive King of the Mountains jersey at the Spanish Grand Tour, which would be a new record. While he had entered 2011 thinking it would likely be his last season as a professional rider, Moncoutié changed his mind about that as well and said he would "probably be part of the bunch in 2012." Taaramäe was also named to the team for the Vuelta.

The squad did slightly better in the stage 1 team time trial than they did in the equivalent stage at the Tour de France, coming 17th of 22 teams. Moncoutié secured a high placing on stage 6, coming in ninth on the day with the lead chase group that finished behind four Liquigas–Cannondale riders at the head of the race. Taaramäe climbed with the race's best riders on stage 9, coming in seventh on La Covatilla. However, he was not any sort of overall threat – he was already over an hour down in the overall standings, having been in breakaways in stages 4, 6, and 8 which did not succeed and lost considerable time to the stage winner each day.

Moncoutié participated in a winning breakaway in stage 11. Some 19 km (12 mi) from the end of the stage, which concluded on a climb at Estación de Montaña Manzaneda, Moncoutié set out on a solo attack to win the stage. The attack was successful, and the veteran Frenchman won a Vuelta stage for the fourth consecutive year. He said after the stage that he rued falling short at Sierra Nevada, and had studied this course profile carefully to know when to attack to get away for victory. The result also moved Moncoutié up to second in the mountains classification, just a single point behind Ag2r–La Mondiale's Matteo Montaguti. He took the jersey two days later on stage 13 by joining another winning breakaway. Montaguti had also made the breakaway, but he was unable to stay at the front of the race all day. Moncoutié took two second places and one win on the final three climbs of the day, resulting in a 12-point lead over Montaguti in the classification. The next day was another good one for the team. Taaramäe made the morning breakaway and held off the race's top riders as they neared the front of the race. He held on for victory atop La Farrapona by 25 seconds ahead of eventual Vuelta champion Juan José Cobo in second, as all other members of the breakaway finished well back.

Moncoutié all but clinched his mountains classification triumph on stage 15. While he finished nine minutes behind Cobo on Angliru, he won the day's second climb to score ten mountain points and increase his lead over Montaguti to 22 points. He scored his final mountain classification points on stage 17, ending with a total of 63. Montaguti nearly reclaimed the jersey on stage 18, when he made a breakaway and Moncoutié did not. Fortunately for Moncoutié, teammate Sijmens had made the escape group and kept Montaguti from maximum points on four of the five climbs. Given that riders who are not involved in a classification nor have teammates that are will generally not ride against someone who is, Sijmens' presence in this breakaway was effectively the only way Moncoutié could have retained the jersey. Moncoutié continued to lead Montaguti, by a score of 63–56. Neither rider scored again, and Moncoutié won his fourth consecutive mountains title, a first in Vuelta history. He was the team's best overall finisher as well, but was not any real threat, coming in 37th overall at a deficit of over an hour to Cobo. Taaramäe, for his part, did not complete the Vuelta, abandoning on stage 17.

== Season victories ==
Date	Race	Competition	Rider	Country	Location
February 4	Étoile de Bessèges, Stage 3	UCI Europe Tour	Samuel Dumoulin (FRA)	France	Laudun
February 13	Tour Méditerranéen, Stage 5	UCI Europe Tour	David Moncoutié (FRA)	France	Mont Faron
February 13	Tour Méditerranéen, Overall	UCI Europe Tour	David Moncoutié (FRA)	France	
February 13	Tour Méditerranéen, Teams classification	UCI Europe Tour	(Note: The riders on the squad were Leonardo Duque, Yohann Bagot, Mickaël Buffaz, Nicolas Edet, Julien El Fares, Luis Maté, David Moncoutié, and Damien Monier)	France	
February 19	Tour du Haut Var, Stage 1	UCI Europe Tour	Samuel Dumoulin (FRA)	France	Grimaud
March 13	Paris–Nice, Youth classification	UCI World Tour	Rein Taaramäe (EST)	France	
March 25	Volta a Catalunya, Stage 5	UCI World Tour	Samuel Dumoulin (FRA)	Spain	Tarragona
March 27	Volta a Catalunya, Stage 7	UCI World Tour	Samuel Dumoulin (FRA)	Spain	Barcelona
March 27	Critérium International, Youth classification	UCI Europe Tour	Rein Taaramäe (EST)	France	
April 3	Flèche d'Emeraude	UCI Europe Tour	Tony Gallopin (FRA)	France	Saint-Malo
May 28	Tartu GP	UCI Europe Tour	Jean Eudes Demaret (FRA)	Estonia	Tartu
June 5	Tour de Luxembourg, Teams classification	UCI Europe Tour	(Note: The riders on the squad were Aleksejs Saramotins, Tony Gallopin, Rémi Cusin, Romain Zingle, Jens Keukeleire, Julien El Fares, Arnaud Labbe, and Yoann Bagot)	Luxembourg	
June 19	Route du Sud, Stage 4	UCI Europe Tour	Luis Maté (ESP)	France	Pau
July 5	Tour of Austria, Stage 3	UCI Europe Tour	Jens Keukeleire (BEL)	Austria	Prägraten am Großvenediger
July 10	Tour of Austria, Mountains classification	UCI Europe Tour	Nicolas Edet (FRA)	Austria	
August 3	Paris–Corrèze, Stage 1	UCI Europe Tour	Samuel Dumoulin (FRA)	France	Bellac
August 4	Paris–Corrèze, Overall	UCI Europe Tour	Samuel Dumoulin (FRA)	France	
August 4	Tour of Denmark, Stage 2	UCI Europe Tour	Rémi Cusin (FRA)	Denmark	Aarhus
August 13	Tour de l'Ain, Overall	UCI Europe Tour	David Moncoutié (FRA)	France	
August 17	Tour du Limousin, Stage 2	UCI Europe Tour	Tony Gallopin (FRA)	France	Allassac
August 31	Vuelta a España, Stage 11	UCI World Tour	David Moncoutié (FRA)	Spain	Manzaneda
September 3	Vuelta a España, Stage 14	UCI World Tour	Rein Taaramäe (EST)	Spain	Lagos de Somiedo
September 11	Vuelta a España, Mountains classification	UCI World Tour	David Moncoutié (FRA)	Spain	
October 2	French Road Cycling Cup	French Road Cycling Cup	Tony Gallopin (FRA)	France	

== National, Continental and World champions ==
Date	Discipline	Jersey	Rider	Country	Location
June 20	Estonian Time Trial Champion		Rein Taaramäe (EST)	Estonia	
