= 2013 French Road Cycling Cup =

Bicycle competition

The 2013 French Road Cycling Cup was the 22nd edition of the French Road Cycling Cup.

Compared to the previous edition, the Flèche d'Emeraude was replaced by the Tour de la Somme. The defending champion from 2012 was Samuel Dumoulin, who won for a second consecutive time after a third place in the final event allowed him to overtake Bryan Coquard and Anthony Geslin in the overall standings. Bryan Coquard still won the youth classification, while FDJ.fr won the teams competition.

== Events ==
Date	Event	Winner	Team	Series leader	Leading Team
27 January	Grand Prix d'Ouverture La Marseillaise	Justin Jules (FRA)	La Pomme Marseille	Justin Jules (FRA)	Ag2r–La Mondiale
16 March	Classic Loire Atlantique	Edwig Cammaerts (BEL)	Cofidis	Justin Jules (FRA)	Cofidis
17 March	Cholet-Pays de Loire	Damien Gaudin (FRA)	Team Europcar	Justin Jules (FRA)	Cofidis
29 March	Route Adélie	Alessandro Malaguti (ITA)	Androni Giocattoli–Venezuela	Justin Jules (FRA)	Ag2r–La Mondiale
9 April	Paris–Camembert	Pierrick Fédrigo (FRA)	FDJ	Justin Jules (FRA)	FDJ
11 April	Grand Prix de Denain	Arnaud Démare (FRA)	FDJ	Justin Jules (FRA)	FDJ
13 April	Tour du Finistère	Cyril Gautier (FRA)	Team Europcar	Justin Jules (FRA)	FDJ
14 April	Tro-Bro Léon	Francis Mourey (FRA)	FDJ	Justin Jules (FRA)	FDJ
25 May	Grand Prix de Plumelec-Morbihan	Samuel Dumoulin (FRA)	Ag2r–La Mondiale	Anthony Geslin (FRA)	FDJ
26 May	Boucles de l'Aulne	Mathieu Ladagnous (FRA)	FDJ	Anthony Geslin (FRA)	FDJ
28 July	Polynormande	José Gonçalves (POR)	La Pomme Marseille	Anthony Geslin (FRA)	FDJ
25 August	Châteauroux Classic	Bryan Coquard (FRA)	Team Europcar	Bryan Coquard (FRA)	FDJ
15 September	Tour du Doubs	Aleksejs Saramotins (LAT)	IAM Cycling	Anthony Geslin (FRA)	FDJ
20 September	Tour de la Somme	Preben Van Hecke (BEL)	Topsport Vlaanderen–Baloise	Anthony Geslin (FRA)	FDJ
22 September	Grand Prix d'Isbergues	Arnaud Démare (FRA)	FDJ.fr	Bryan Coquard (FRA)	FDJ
6 October	Tour de Vendée	Nacer Bouhanni (FRA)	FDJ.fr	Samuel Dumoulin (FRA)	FDJ

== Points standings ==
=== Individual ===
In order to be eligible for the classification, riders either had to be French or competed for a French-licensed team.

Pos.	Rider	Team	Points
1	Samuel Dumoulin (FRA)	Ag2r–La Mondiale	155
2	Bryan Coquard (FRA)	Team Europcar	149
3	Anthony Geslin (FRA)	FDJ.fr	128
4	Yannick Martinez (FRA)	La Pomme Marseille	111
5	Arnaud Démare (FRA)	FDJ.fr	100
6	Justin Jules (FRA)	La Pomme Marseille	93
7	Julien Simon (FRA)	Sojasun	93
8	Nacer Bouhanni (FRA)	FDJ.fr	75
9	Yauheni Hutarovich (BLR)	Ag2r–La Mondiale	73
10	Francis Mourey (FRA)	FDJ.fr	68

=== Young rider classification ===
In order to be eligible for the classification, riders had to be younger than 25 and either had to be French or competed for a French-licensed team.

Pos.	Rider	Team	Points
1	Bryan Coquard (FRA)	Team Europcar	149
2	Yannick Martinez (FRA)	La Pomme Marseille	111
3	Arnaud Démare (FRA)	FDJ.fr	100
4	Nacer Bouhanni (FRA)	FDJ.fr	75
5	José Gonçalves (POR)	La Pomme Marseille	50
6	Armindo Fonseca (FRA)	Bretagne–Séché Environnement	49
7	Johan Le Bon (FRA)	FDJ.fr	35
8	Vegard Stake Laengen (NOR)	Bretagne–Séché Environnement	28
9	Thomas Damuseau (FRA)	Argos–Shimano	25
10	Arthur Vichot (FRA)	FDJ.fr	25

=== Teams ===
Only French teams are eligible to be classified in the teams classification.

Pos.	Team	Points
1	FDJ.fr	145
2	Cofidis	119
3	Bretagne–Séché Environnement	114
4	Ag2r–La Mondiale	103
5	Sojasun	101
6	Team Europcar	94
7	La Pomme Marseille	67
8	BigMat–Auber 93	66
9	Roubaix–Lille Métropole	64
