= 2012 French Road Cycling Cup =

Bicycle competition

The 2012 French Road Cycling Cup was the 21st edition of the French Road Cycling Cup and was won by Samuel Dumoulin.

Compared to the previous edition, two new events were added to the calendar, namely the Classic Loire Atlantique and the Route Adélie. The defending champion from 2011 was Tony Gallopin.

== Events ==
Date	Event	Winner	Team	Series leader	Leading Team
29 January	Grand Prix d'Ouverture La Marseillaise	Samuel Dumoulin (FRA)	Cofidis	Samuel Dumoulin (FRA)	Cofidis
17 March	Classic Loire Atlantique	Florian Vachon (FRA)	Bretagne–Schuller	Florian Vachon (FRA)	Bretagne–Schuller
18 March	Cholet-Pays de Loire	Arnaud Démare (FRA)	FDJ–BigMat	Arnaud Démare (FRA)	FDJ–BigMat
30 March	Route Adélie	Roberto Ferrari (ITA)	Androni Giocattoli–Venezuela	Arnaud Démare (FRA)	Bretagne–Schuller
1 April	Flèche d'Emeraude	Roberto Ferrari (ITA)	Androni Giocattoli–Venezuela	Arnaud Démare (FRA)	Saur–Sojasun
10 April	Paris–Camembert	Pierre-Luc Périchon (FRA)	La Pomme Marseille	Pierre-Luc Périchon (FRA)	Saur–Sojasun
12 April	Grand Prix de Denain	Juan José Haedo (ARG)	Team Saxo Bank	Arnaud Démare (FRA)	Bretagne–Schuller
14 April	Tour du Finistère	Julien Simon (FRA)	Saur–Sojasun	Samuel Dumoulin (FRA)	Saur–Sojasun
15 April	Tro-Bro Léon	Ryan Roth (CAN)	SpiderTech–C10	Samuel Dumoulin (FRA)	Bretagne–Schuller
26 May	Grand Prix de Plumelec-Morbihan	Julien Simon (FRA)	Saur–Sojasun	Samuel Dumoulin (FRA)	Bretagne–Schuller
27 May	Boucles de l'Aulne	Sébastien Hinault (FRA)	Ag2r–La Mondiale	Julien Simon (FRA)	Bretagne–Schuller
29 July	Polynormande	Tony Hurel (FRA)	Team Europcar	Samuel Dumoulin (FRA)	Bretagne–Schuller
19 August	Châteauroux Classic	Rafael Andriato (BRA)	Farnese Vini–Selle Italia	Samuel Dumoulin (FRA)	Bretagne–Schuller
2 September	Tour du Doubs	Jérôme Coppel (FRA)	Saur–Sojasun	Samuel Dumoulin (FRA)	Bretagne–Schuller
16 September	Grand Prix d'Isbergues	John Degenkolb (GER)	Argos–Shimano	Samuel Dumoulin (FRA)	Bretagne–Schuller
14 October	Tour de Vendée	Wesley Kreder (NED)	Vacansoleil–DCM	Samuel Dumoulin (FRA)	Bretagne–Schuller

== Final standings ==
=== Individual ===
Note: only French riders and riders of French teams are eligible to score points

#	Rider	Team	Points
1	Samuel Dumoulin (FRA)	Cofidis	232
2	Julien Simon (FRA)	Saur–Sojasun	159
3	Laurent Pichon (FRA)	Bretagne–Schuller	94
4	Arnaud Démare (FRA)	FDJ–BigMat	88
5	Romain Feillu (FRA)	Vacansoleil–DCM	84
6	Sébastien Hinault (FRA)	Ag2r–La Mondiale	75
7	Benoit Jarrier (FRA)	Veranda Rideau - Super U	65
8	Jérémie Galland (FRA)	Saur–Sojasun	62
9	Tony Hurel (FRA)	Team Europcar	61
10	Pierrick Fédrigo (FRA)	FDJ–BigMat	58

=== Team ===
Note: only French teams are eligible to score points

#	Team	Points
1	Bretagne–Schuller	140
2	Saur–Sojasun	115
3	FDJ–BigMat	106
4	Team Europcar	94
5	Ag2r–La Mondiale	88
6	La Pomme Marseille	87
7	Cofidis	79
8	Auber 93	71
9	Veranda Rideau - Super U	62
10	Roubaix–Lille Métropole	59
