= 2015 French Road Cycling Cup =

Bicycle competition

The 2015 French Road Cycling Cup was the 24th edition of the French Road Cycling Cup and was won by Nacer Bouhanni.

Compared to the previous edition, the Châteauroux Classic and the Tour de la Somme had been replaced by the Grand Prix de Fourmies and La Roue Tourangelle. The defending champion from the last season was Julien Simon.

== Events ==
Date	Event	Winner	Team	Series leader	Leading Team
1 February	Grand Prix d'Ouverture La Marseillaise	Pim Ligthart (NED)	Lotto–Soudal	Kenneth Vanbilsen (BEL)	Roubaix–Lille Métropole
21 March	Classic Loire Atlantique	Alexis Gougeard (FRA)	AG2R La Mondiale	Alexis Gougeard (FRA)	Roubaix–Lille Métropole
22 March	Cholet-Pays de Loire	Pierrick Fédrigo (FRA)	Bretagne–Séché Environnement	Pierrick Fédrigo (FRA)	Roubaix–Lille Métropole
3 April	Route Adélie	Romain Feillu (FRA)	Bretagne–Séché Environnement	Baptiste Planckaert (BEL)	Roubaix–Lille Métropole
5 April	Paris–Camembert	Julien Loubet (FRA)	Team Marseille 13 KTM	Pierrick Fédrigo (FRA)	Bretagne–Séché Environnement
16 April	Grand Prix de Denain	Nacer Bouhanni (FRA)	Cofidis	Nacer Bouhanni (FRA)	Bretagne–Séché Environnement
18 April	Tour du Finistère	Tim De Troyer (BEL)	Wanty–Groupe Gobert	Pierrick Fédrigo (FRA)	Bretagne–Séché Environnement
19 April	Tro-Bro Léon	Alexandre Geniez (FRA)	FDJ	Pierrick Fédrigo (FRA)	Bretagne–Séché Environnement
26 April	La Roue Tourangelle	Lorenzo Manzin (FRA)	FDJ	Pierrick Fédrigo (FRA)	Bretagne–Séché Environnement
30 May	Grand Prix de Plumelec-Morbihan	Alexis Vuillermoz (FRA)	AG2R La Mondiale	Pierrick Fédrigo (FRA)	Bretagne–Séché Environnement
31 May	Boucles de l'Aulne	Alo Jakin (EST)	Auber 93	Pierrick Fédrigo (FRA)	Bretagne–Séché Environnement
2 August	Polynormande	Oliver Naesen (BEL)	Topsport Vlaanderen–Baloise	Pierrick Fédrigo (FRA)	Bretagne–Séché Environnement
6 September	Grand Prix de Fourmies	Fabio Felline (ITA)	Trek Factory Racing	Pierrick Fédrigo (FRA)	Bretagne–Séché Environnement
13 September	Tour du Doubs	Eduardo Sepúlveda (ARG)	Bretagne–Séché Environnement	Pierrick Fédrigo (FRA)	Bretagne–Séché Environnement
20 September	Grand Prix d'Isbergues	Nacer Bouhanni (FRA)	Cofidis	Nacer Bouhanni (FRA)	Bretagne–Séché Environnement
4 October	Tour de Vendée	Christophe Laporte (FRA)	Cofidis	Nacer Bouhanni (FRA)	Bretagne–Séché Environnement

== Final Points standings ==
=== Individual ===
In order to be eligible for the classification, riders either had to be French or competed for a French-licensed team.

Pos.	Rider	Team	Points
1	Nacer Bouhanni (FRA)	Cofidis	178
2	Baptiste Planckaert (BEL)	Roubaix–Lille Métropole	172
3	Pierrick Fédrigo (FRA)	Bretagne–Séché Environnement	151
4	Samuel Dumoulin (FRA)	AG2R La Mondiale	103
5	Samuel Loubet (FRA)	Team Marseille 13 KTM	91
6	Alexandre Geniez (FRA)	FDJ	80
7	Maxime Renault (FRA)	Auber 93	74
8	Romain Feillu (FRA)	Bretagne–Séché Environnement	65
9	Julien Simon (FRA)	Cofidis	63
10	Steven Tronet (FRA)	Auber 93	63

=== Young rider classification ===
In order to be eligible for the classification, riders had to be younger than 25 and either had to be French or competed for a French-licensed team.

Pos.	Rider	Team	Points
1	Nacer Bouhanni (FRA)	Cofidis	178
2	Maxime Renault (FRA)	Auber 93	74
3	Lorenzo Manzin (FRA)	FDJ	62
4	Christophe Laporte (FRA)	Cofidis	53
5	Eduardo Sepúlveda (ARG)	Bretagne–Séché Environnement	50
6	Alexis Gougeard (FRA)	AG2R La Mondiale	50
7	Romain Combaud (FRA)	Armée de Terre	46
8	Rudy Barbier (FRA)	Roubaix–Lille Métropole	45
9	Florian Sénéchal (FRA)	Cofidis	41
10	Clément Venturini (FRA)	Cofidis	35

=== Teams ===
Only French teams are eligible to be classified in the teams classification.

Pos.	Team	Points
1	Bretagne–Séché Environnement	139
2	Auber 93	126
3	Roubaix–Lille Métropole	118
4	Team Marseille 13 KTM	101
5	Armée de Terre	95
6	FDJ	88
7	Team Europcar	74
8	Cofidis	68
9	AG2R La Mondiale	63
