= 2011 French Road Cycling Cup =

Bicycle competition

The 2011 French Road Cycling Cup was the 20th edition of the French Road Cycling Cup.

The Trophée des Grimpeurs was scheduled to make a return to the calendar following its cancellation due to financial difficulties in 2010, however for the same reason as the previous year it got cancelled again. Two new events were added to the calendar, namely the Flèche d'Emeraude and the Boucles de l'Aulne. The defending champion from 2010 was Leonardo Duque of Cofidis.

== Events ==
Date	Event	Winner	Team	Series leader	Leading Team
30 January	Grand Prix d'Ouverture La Marseillaise	Jérémy Roy (FRA)	FDJ	Jérémy Roy (FRA)	FDJ
20 March	Cholet-Pays de Loire	Thomas Voeckler (FRA)	Team Europcar	Jérémy Roy (FRA); Thomas Voeckler (FRA)	FDJ
3 April	Flèche d'Emeraude	Tony Gallopin (FRA)	Cofidis	Tony Gallopin (FRA)	Cofidis
12 April	Paris–Camembert	Sandy Casar (FRA)	FDJ	Tony Gallopin (FRA)	FDJ
14 April	Grand Prix de Denain	Jimmy Casper (FRA)	Saur–Sojasun	Tony Gallopin (FRA)	FDJ
16 April	Tour du Finistère	Romain Feillu (FRA)	Vacansoleil–DCM	Romain Feillu (FRA)	FDJ
17 April	Tro-Bro Léon	Vincent Jérôme (FRA)	Team Europcar	Romain Feillu (FRA)	FDJ
1 May	Trophée des Grimpeurs	Race Cancelled		Romain Feillu (FRA)	FDJ
28 May	Grand Prix de Plumelec-Morbihan	Sylvain Georges (FRA)	BigMat–Auber 93	Romain Feillu (FRA)	FDJ
29 May	Boucles de l'Aulne	Martijn Keizer (NED)	Vacansoleil–DCM	Romain Feillu (FRA)	FDJ
31 July	Polynormande	Anthony Delaplace (FRA)	Saur–Sojasun	Tony Gallopin (FRA)	Cofidis
21 August	Châteauroux Classic	Anthony Ravard (FRA)	Ag2r–La Mondiale	Tony Gallopin (FRA)	Cofidis
4 September	Tour du Doubs	Arthur Vichot (FRA)	FDJ	Tony Gallopin (FRA)	FDJ
18 September	Grand Prix d'Isbergues	Jonas Aaen Jørgensen (DEN)	Saxo Bank–SunGard	Tony Gallopin (FRA)	FDJ
2 October	Tour de Vendée	Marco Marcato (ITA)	Vacansoleil–DCM	Tony Gallopin (FRA)	FDJ

== Final overall standings ==
=== Individual ===
#	Rider	Team	Points
1	Tony Gallopin (FRA)	Cofidis	139
2	Romain Feillu (FRA)	Vacansoleil–DCM	124
3	Sylvain Georges (FRA)	BigMat–Auber 93	93
4	Anthony Delaplace (FRA)	Saur–Sojasun	90
5	Romain Hardy (FRA)	Bretagne–Schuller	90
6	Sandy Casar (FRA)	FDJ	75
7	Thomas Voeckler (FRA)	Team Europcar	70
8	Arthur Vichot (FRA)	FDJ	68
9	Anthony Ravard (FRA)	Ag2r–La Mondiale	65
10	Julien El Fares (FRA)	Cofidis	61

=== Team ===
#	Team	Points
1	FDJ	114
2	Saur–Sojasun	104
3	Bretagne–Schuller	104
4	Team Europcar	101
5	Cofidis	81
6	BigMat–Auber 93	78
7	Ag2r–La Mondiale	68
8	Roubaix–Lille Métropole	54

== 2011 French Road Cycling Cup race results ==
1. 30 January 2011 - Grand Prix d'Ouverture La Marseillaise

	Cyclist	Team	Time
1	Jérémy Roy (FRA)	FDJ	3h 30' 55"
2	Sylvain Georges (FRA)	BigMat–Auber 93	+ 2' 38"
3	Romain Feillu (FRA)	Vacansoleil–DCM	+ 2' 43"
4	Jure Kocjan (SLO)	Team Type 1–Sanofi Aventis	+ 2' 43"
5	Arthur Vichot (FRA)	FDJ	+ 2' 43"
6	Cyril Gautier (FRA)	Team Europcar	+ 2' 43"
7	Riccardo Riccò (ITA)	Vacansoleil–DCM	+ 2' 43"
8	Cédric Pineau (FRA)	FDJ	+ 2' 43"
9	Julien Antomarchi (FRA)	La Pomme Marseille	+ 2' 43"
10	Julien El Fares (FRA)	Cofidis	+ 2' 43"

2. 20 March 2011 - Cholet-Pays de Loire

	Cyclist	Team	Time
1	Thomas Voeckler (FRA)	Team Europcar	4h 49' 36"
2	Tony Gallopin (FRA)	Cofidis	+ 0"
3	Benjamin Giraud (FRA)	La Pomme Marseille	+ 0"
4	Mathieu Drujon (FRA)	BigMat–Auber 93	+ 0"
5	Stéphane Poulhiès (FRA)	Saur–Sojasun	+ 0"
6	James Vanlandschoot (BEL)	Veranda's Willems–Accent	+ 0"
7	Jean-Luc Delpech (FRA)	Bretagne–Schuller	+ 0"
8	Egoitz Garcia Echeguibel (ESP)	Caja Rural	+ 0"
9	Fabien Bacquet (FRA)	BigMat–Auber 93	+ 0"
10	Romain Hardy (FRA)	Bretagne–Schuller	+ 0"

3. 3 April 2011 - Flèche d'Emeraude

	Cyclist	Team	Time
1	Tony Gallopin (FRA)	Cofidis	3h 55' 29"
2	Jure Kocjan (SLO)	Team Type 1–Sanofi Aventis	+ 0"
3	Francesco Ginanni (ITA)	Androni Giocattoli	+ 0"
4	Gianni Meersman (BEL)	FDJ	+ 0"
5	Joaquín Sobrino (ESP)	Caja Rural	+ 0"
6	Jean-Luc Delpech (FRA)	Bretagne–Schuller	+ 0"
7	Juan Pablo Forero (COL)	Colombia es Pasión–Café de Colombia	+ 0"
8	Laurent Pichon (FRA)	Bretagne–Schuller	+ 0"
9	Florian Vachon (FRA)	Bretagne–Schuller	+ 0"
10	Fabien Bacquet (FRA)	BigMat–Auber 93	+ 0"

4. 12 April 2011 - Paris–Camembert

	Cyclist	Team	Time
1	Sandy Casar (FRA)	FDJ	5h 08' 28"
2	Romain Hardy (FRA)	Bretagne–Schuller	+ 0"
3	Julien Antomarchi (FRA)	La Pomme Marseille	+ 0"
4	Maxime Mederel (FRA)	BigMat–Auber 93	+ 0"
5	Pierrick Fédrigo (FRA)	FDJ	+ 0"
6	Sébastien Joly (FRA)	Saur–Sojasun	+ 4"
7	Iker Camaño (ESP)	Endura Racing	+ 4"
8	Rémi Pauriol (FRA)	FDJ	+ 4"
9	Jonas Ljungblad (SWE)	Differdange–Magic–SportFood.de	+ 4"
10	Nicolas Roche (IRL)	Ag2r–La Mondiale	+ 4"

5. 14 April 2011 - Grand Prix de Denain

	Cyclist	Team	Time
1	Jimmy Casper (FRA)	Saur–Sojasun	4h 32' 10"
2	Romain Feillu (FRA)	Vacansoleil–DCM	+ 0"
3	Aidis Kruopis (LIT)	Landbouwkrediet	+ 0"
4	Leigh Howard (AUS)	HTC–Highroad	+ 0"
5	Denis Flahaut (FRA)	Roubaix–Lille Métropole	+ 0"
6	Danilo Napolitano (ITA)	Acqua & Sapone	+ 0"
7	Robert Hunter (RSA)	Team RadioShack	+ 0"
8	Nacer Bouhanni (FRA)	FDJ	+ 0"
9	Fabien Bacquet (FRA)	BigMat–Auber 93	+ 0"
10	Michael Van Stayen (BEL)	Topsport Vlaanderen–Mercator	+ 0"

6. 16 April 2011 - Tour du Finistère

	Cyclist	Team	Time
1	Romain Feillu (FRA)	Vacansoleil–DCM	4h 13' 52"
2	Armindo Fonseca (FRA)	Bretagne–Schuller	+ 1"
3	Sandy Casar (FRA)	FDJ	+ 2"
4	Thomas Voeckler (FRA)	Team Europcar	+ 2"
5	Justin Jules (FRA)	La Pomme Marseille	+ 2"
6	Nicolas Vogondy (FRA)	Cofidis	+ 2"
7	Maxime Mederel (FRA)	BigMat–Auber 93	+ 2"
8	Romain Hardy (FRA)	Bretagne–Schuller	+ 2"
9	Jean-Marc Marino (FRA)	Saur–Sojasun	+ 2"
10	Sylvain Georges (FRA)	BigMat–Auber 93	+ 2"

7. 17 April 2011 - Tro-Bro Léon

	Cyclist	Team	Time
1	Vincent Jérôme (FRA)	Team Europcar	4h 58' 07"
2	Will Routley (CAN)	SpiderTech–C10	+ 1"
3	Arnold Jeannesson (FRA)	FDJ	+ 20"
4	Steve Chainel (FRA)	FDJ	+ 20"
5	Benoit Daeninck (FRA)	Roubaix–Lille Métropole	+ 30"
6	Bruno Langlois (CAN)	SpiderTech–C10	+ 32"
7	Mathieu Ladagnous (FRA)	FDJ	+ 36"
8	Mathieu Drujon (FRA)	BigMat–Auber 93	+ 36"
9	Alexandre Blain (FRA)	Endura Racing	+ 36"
10	Kristof Goddaert (BEL)	Ag2r–La Mondiale	+ 36"

8. 28 May 2011 - Grand Prix de Plumelec-Morbihan

	Cyclist	Team	Time
1	Sylvain Georges (FRA)	BigMat–Auber 93	4h 13' 52"
2	Pierrick Fédrigo (FRA)	FDJ	+ 0"
3	Jérémie Galland (FRA)	Saur–Sojasun	+ 0"
4	Julien Guay (FRA)	Roubaix–Lille Métropole	+ 0"
5	Julien Simon (FRA)	Saur–Sojasun	+ 0"
6	Tony Gallopin (FRA)	Cofidis	+ 0"
7	Rob Ruijgh (NED)	Vacansoleil–DCM	+ 0"
8	Yohan Cauquil (FRA)	La Pomme Marseille	+ 0"
9	Jonathan Fumeaux (SWI)	Atlas Personal	+ 0"
10	Julien El Fares (FRA)	Cofidis	+ 0"

9. 29 May 2011 - Boucles de l'Aulne

	Cyclist	Team	Time
1	Martijn Keizer (NED)	Vacansoleil–DCM	4h 03' 06"
2	Anthony Delaplace (FRA)	Saur–Sojasun	+ 2"
3	Anthony Charteau (FRA)	Team Europcar	+ 9"
4	Jonathan Hivert (FRA)	Saur–Sojasun	+ 17"
5	Cyril Gautier (FRA)	Team Europcar	+ 17"
6	Steven Tronet (FRA)	Roubaix–Lille Métropole	+ 51"
7	Yohann Gène (FRA)	Team Europcar	+ 51"
8	Yohan Cauquil (FRA)	La Pomme Marseille	+ 51"
9	Julien El Fares (FRA)	Cofidis	+ 51"
10	Rémi Pauriol (FRA)	FDJ	+ 51"
