= 2010 French Road Cycling Cup =

Bicycle competition

The 2010 French Road Cycling Cup is the 19th edition of the French Road Cycling Cup. The 2010 calendar saw a net addition of one race to the calendar to make a 12-round calendar, with the Grand Prix d'Ouverture La Marseillaise and Tour du Doubs being added; the Trophée des Grimpeurs was planned to be the seventh round of the Cup, but was cancelled due to a lack of sponsor and location. Leonardo Duque of Cofidis won the overall competition.

== Events ==
Date	Event	Winner	Team	Series leader
31 January	Grand Prix d'Ouverture La Marseillaise	Jonathan Hivert (FRA)	Saur–Sojasun	Jonathan Hivert (FRA)
21 March	Cholet-Pays de Loire	Leonardo Duque (COL)	Cofidis	Jonathan Hivert (FRA) and Leonardo Duque (COL)
13 April	Paris–Camembert	Sébastien Minard (FRA)	Cofidis	Leonardo Duque (COL)
15 April	Grand Prix de Denain	Denis Flahaut (FRA)	ISD Continental Team	Leonardo Duque (COL)
16 April	Tour du Finistère	Florian Vachon (FRA)	Bretagne–Schuller	Leonardo Duque (COL)
18 April	Tro-Bro Léon	Jérémy Roy (FRA)	Française des Jeux	Florian Vachon (FRA)
29 May	Grand Prix de Plumelec-Morbihan	Wesley Sulzberger (AUS)	Française des Jeux	Florian Vachon (FRA)
1 August	Polynormande	Andy Cappelle (BEL)	Verandas Willems	Florian Vachon (FRA)
29 August	Châteauroux Classic	Anthony Ravard (FRA)	Ag2r–La Mondiale	Florian Vachon (FRA)
5 September	Tour du Doubs	Jérôme Coppel (FRA)	Saur–Sojasun	Leonardo Duque (COL)
19 September	Grand Prix d'Isbergues	Aleksejs Saramotins (LAT)	Team HTC–Columbia	Leonardo Duque (COL)
26 September	Tour de Vendée	Koldo Fernández (ESP)	Euskaltel–Euskadi	Leonardo Duque (COL)

== 2010 French Road Cycling Cup results ==
=== 1.Grand Prix d'Ouverture La Marseillaise ===
	Cyclist	Team	Time
1	Jonathan Hivert (FRA)	Saur–Sojasun	3h 34' 22"
2	Johnny Hoogerland (NED)	Vacansoleil	+ 0"
3	Samuel Dumoulin (FRA)	Cofidis	+ 0"
4	Steve Cummings (GBR)	Team Sky	+ 0"
5	Rémy Di Gregorio (FRA)	Française des Jeux	+ 0"
6	Pieter Jacobs (BEL)	Topsport Vlaanderen–Mercator	+ 0"
7	Martial Ricci Poggi (FRA)	Landbouwkrediet	+ 2"
8	Brice Feillu (FRA)	Vacansoleil	+ 5"
9	Kalle Kriit (EST)	Cofidis	+ 5"
10	Romain Feillu (FRA)	Vacansoleil	+ 11"

=== 2.Cholet-Pays de Loire ===
	Cyclist	Team	Time
1	Leonardo Duque (COL)	Cofidis	4h 52' 33"
2	Mathieu Ladagnous (FRA)	Française des Jeux	+ 0"
3	Klaas Lodewyck (BEL)	Topsport Vlaanderen–Mercator	+ 0"
4	Cédric Pineau (FRA)	Roubaix–Lille Métropole	+ 0"
5	Romain Feillu (FRA)	Vacansoleil	+ 0"
6	Kevin Ista (BEL)	Cofidis	+ 0"
7	Florian Vachon (FRA)	Bretagne–Schuller	+ 0"
8	Davy Commeyne (FRA)	Landbouwkrediet	+ 0"
9	Jimmy Casper (FRA)	Saur–Sojasun	+ 0"
10	Andrea Piechele (ITA)	Carmiooro NGC	+ 0"

=== 3.Paris–Camembert ===
	Cyclist	Team	Time
1	Sébastien Minard (FRA)	Cofidis	4h 38' 18"
2	Maxime Médérel (FRA)	BigMat–Auber 93	+ 0"
3	Laurent Mangel (FRA)	Saur–Sojasun	+ 24"
4	Anthony Roux (FRA)	Française des Jeux	+ 24"
5	Leonardo Duque (COL)	Cofidis	+ 34"
6	José Joaquín Rojas Gil (ESP)	Caisse d'Epargne	+ 34"
7	Lilian Jégou (FRA)	Bretagne–Schuller	+ 34"
8	Freddy Bichot (FRA)	Bbox Bouygues Telecom	+ 34"
9	Sep Vanmarcke (BEL)	Topsport Vlaanderen–Mercator	+ 34"
10	Jean-Marc Bideau (FRA)	Bretagne–Schuller	+ 34"

=== 4.Grand Prix de Denain ===
	Cyclist	Team	Time
1	Denis Flahaut (FRA)	ISD Continental Team	4h 30' 45"
2	Florian Vachon (FRA)	Bretagne–Schuller	+ 0"
3	Enrico Rossi (ITA)	Ceramica Flaminia	+ 0"
4	Denis Galimzyanov (RUS)	Team Katusha	+ 0"
5	Daniele Colli (ITA)	Ceramica Flaminia	+ 0"
6	Sébastien Chavanel (FRA)	Française des Jeux	+ 0"
7	Yauheni Hutarovich (BLR)	Française des Jeux	+ 0"
8	Jimmy Casper (FRA)	Saur–Sojasun	+ 0"
9	Thomas Fothen (GER)	Team Milram	+ 0"
10	Kris Boeckmans (BEL)	Topsport Vlaanderen–Mercator	+ 0"

=== 5.Tour du Finistère ===
	Cyclist	Team	Time
1	Florian Vachon (FRA)	Bretagne–Schuller	4h 46' 24"
2	Leonardo Duque (COL)	Cofidis	+ 0"
3	Cédric Pineau (FRA)	Roubaix–Lille Métropole	+ 0"
4	Romain Hardy (FRA)	Bretagne–Schuller	+ 0"
5	Thibaut Pinot (FRA)	Française des Jeux	+ 2"
6	Jérôme Coppel (FRA)	Saur–Sojasun	+ 2"
7	Sylwester Janiszewski (POL)	CCC–Polsat–Polkowice	+ 4"
8	Eduardo Gonzalo (ESP)	Bretagne–Schuller	+ 4"
9	Anthony Charteau (FRA)	Bbox Bouygues Telecom	+ 7"
10	Jérémy Roy (FRA)	Française des Jeux	+ 19"

=== 6.Tro-Bro Léon ===
	Cyclist	Team	Time
1	Jérémy Roy (FRA)	Française des Jeux	4h 58' 26"
2	Renaud Dion (FRA)	Roubaix–Lille Métropole	+ 3"
3	Lloyd Mondory (FRA)	Ag2r–La Mondiale	+ 5"
4	Jean-Luc Delpech (FRA)	Bretagne–Schuller	+ 5"
5	Florian Vachon (FRA)	Bretagne–Schuller	+ 13"
6	Benoît Daeninc (FRA)	Roubaix–Lille Métropole	+ 38"
7	Cyril Lemoine (FRA)	Saur–Sojasun	+ 38"
8	Perrig Quéméneur (FRA)	Bbox Bouygues Telecom	+ 38"
9	Romain Lemarchand (FRA)	BigMat–Auber 93	+ 38"
10	Jimmy Engoulvent (FRA)	Saur–Sojasun	+ 1' 22"

=== 7.Grand Prix de Plumelec-Morbihan ===
	Cyclist	Team	Time
1	Wesley Sulzberger (AUS)	Française des Jeux	4h 23' 41"
2	Renaud Dion (FRA)	Roubaix Lille Metropole	+ 41"
3	Stéphane Augé (FRA)	Cofidis	+ 44"
4	Pierrick Fédrigo (FRA)	Bbox Bouygues Telecom	+ 48"
5	David Lelay (FRA)	Ag2r–La Mondiale	+ 52"
6	Maxime Médérel (FRA)	BigMat–Auber 93	+ 1' 09"
7	Sébastien Duret (FRA)	Bretagne–Schuller	+ 1' 19"
8	Brice Feillu (FRA)	Vacansoleil	+ 2' 13"
9	Pierre Rolland (FRA)	Bbox Bouygues Telecom	+ 3' 31"
10	Laurent Pichon (FRA)	Bretagne–Schuller	+ 3' 34"

=== 8.Polynormande ===
	Cyclist	Team	Time
1	Andy Capelle (BEL)	Verandas Willems	3h 40' 49"
2	Jérémy Galland (FRA)	Saur–Sojasun	+ 3"
3	Romain Hardy (FRA)	Bretagne–Schuller	+ 3"
4	Lloyd Mondory (FRA)	Ag2r–La Mondiale	+ 3"
5	Sébastien Minard (FRA)	Cofidis	+ 9"
6	Benoît Vaugrenard (FRA)	Française des Jeux	+ 9"
7	Sébastien Duret (FRA)	Bretagne–Schuller	+ 29"
8	Julien Bérard (FRA)	Ag2r–La Mondiale	+ 1' 58"
9	Stéphane Augé (FRA)	Cofidis	+ 1' 58"
10	Grégory Habeaux (BEL)	Verandas Willems	+ 2' 00"

=== 9.Châteauroux Classic ===
	Cyclist	Team	Time
1	Anthony Ravard (FRA)	Ag2r–La Mondiale	4h 40' 08"
2	Romain Feillu (FRA)	Vacansoleil	+ 0"
3	Enrico Rossi (ITA)	Ceramica Flaminia	+ 0"
4	Fumiyuki Beppu (JPN)	Team RadioShack	+ 0"
5	Boy Van Poppel (NED)	Rabobank Continental Team	+ 0"
6	Francisco Ventoso (ESP)	Carmiooro NGC	+ 0"
7	Geoffroy Lequatre (FRA)	Team RadioShack	+ 0"
8	Sébastien Turgot (FRA)	Bbox Bouygues Telecom	+ 0"
9	Florian Vachon (FRA)	Bretagne–Schuller	+ 0"
10	Jimmy Casper (FRA)	Saur–Sojasun	+ 0"

=== 10.Tour du Doubs ===
	Cyclist	Team	Time
1	Jérôme Coppel (FRA)	Saur–Sojasun	4h 26' 29"
2	Jonathan Hivert (FRA)	Saur–Sojasun	+ 11"
3	Leonardo Duque (COL)	Cofidis	+ 11"
4	Mathieu Ladagnous (FRA)	Française des Jeux	+ 11"
5	Laurent Mangel (FRA)	Saur–Sojasun	+ 11"
6	Julien Mazet (FRA)	BigMat–Auber 93	+ 11"
7	Romain Lemarchand (FRA)	BigMat–Auber 93	+ 11"
8	Florian Guillou (FRA)	Bretagne–Schuller	+ 11"
9	Julien Loubet (FRA)	Ag2r–La Mondiale	+ 11"
10	Guillaume Levarlet (FRA)	Saur–Sojasun	+ 11"

=== 11.Grand Prix d'Isbergues ===
	Cyclist	Team	Time
1	Aleksejs Saramotins (LAT)	Team HTC–Columbia	4h 48' 13"
2	Denis Galimzyanov (RUS)	Team Katusha	+ 2"
3	Romain Feillu (FRA)	Vacansoleil	+ 2"
4	Jonathan Hivert (FRA)	Saur–Sojasun	+ 2"
5	Kevin Ista (BEL)	Cofidis	+ 2"
6	Marcel Sieberg (GER)	Team HTC–Columbia	+ 2"
7	Bert De Backer (BEL)	Skil–Shimano	+ 2"
8	Yoann Offredo (FRA)	Française des Jeux	+ 2"
9	Sergey Lagutin (UZB)	Vacansoleil	+ 2"
10	Robin Chaigneau (NED)	Skil–Shimano	+ 2"

=== 12.Tour de Vendée ===
	Cyclist	Team	Time
1	Koldo Fernández (ESP)	Euskaltel–Euskadi	4h 44' 07"
2	Davide Appolonio (ITA)	Cervélo TestTeam	+ 0"
3	Jonathan Hivert (FRA)	Saur–Sojasun	+ 0"
4	Cédric Pineau (FRA)	Roubaix–Lille Métropole	+ 0"
5	Baptiste Planckaert (BEL)	Landbouwkrediet	+ 0"
6	Maxime Vantomme (BEL)	Team Katusha	+ 0"
7	Florian Vachon (FRA)	Bretagne–Schuller	+ 0"
8	Davy Commeyne (BEL)	Landbouwkrediet	+ 0"
9	Aristide Ratti (ITA)	Carmiooro NGC	+ 0"
10	Leonardo Duque (COL)	Cofidis	+ 0"
