= 2014 French Road Cycling Cup =

Bicycle competition

The 2014 French Road Cycling Cup was the 23rd edition of the French Road Cycling Cup.

Compared to the previous edition, the same races were held, with the only change being the Tour de la Somme, which moved from September to early May. The defending champion from the last two seasons was Samuel Dumoulin and was succeeded by Julien Simon, who clinched the title on September 21 after the Grand Prix d'Isbergues when he obtained a 64-point lead over Dumoulin, with only 50 points remaining to earn.

== Events ==
Date	Event	Winner	Team	Series leader	Leading Team
2 February	Grand Prix d'Ouverture La Marseillaise	Kenneth Vanbilsen (BEL)	Topsport Vlaanderen–Baloise	Baptiste Planckaert (BEL)	Roubaix–Lille Métropole
22 March	Classic Loire Atlantique	Alexis Gougeard (FRA)	Ag2r–La Mondiale	Alexis Gougeard (FRA)	Roubaix–Lille Métropole
23 March	Cholet-Pays de Loire	Tom Van Asbroeck (BEL)	Topsport Vlaanderen–Baloise	Alexis Gougeard (FRA)	Ag2r–La Mondiale
4 April	Route Adélie	Bryan Coquard (FRA)	Team Europcar	Julien Simon (FRA)	Ag2r–La Mondiale
15 April	Paris–Camembert	Bryan Coquard (FRA)	Team Europcar	Bryan Coquard (FRA)	Ag2r–La Mondiale
17 April	Grand Prix de Denain	Nacer Bouhanni (FRA)	FDJ.fr	Bryan Coquard (FRA)	Ag2r–La Mondiale
19 April	Tour du Finistère	Antoine Demoitié (BEL)	Wallonie-Bruxelles	Julien Simon (FRA)	Bretagne–Séché Environnement
20 April	Tro-Bro Léon	Adrien Petit (FRA)	Cofidis	Julien Simon (FRA)	Bretagne–Séché Environnement
4 May	Tour de la Somme	Yauheni Hutarovich (BLR)	Ag2r–La Mondiale	Julien Simon (FRA)	Bretagne–Séché Environnement
31 May	Grand Prix de Plumelec-Morbihan	Julien Simon (FRA)	Cofidis	Julien Simon (FRA)	Bretagne–Séché Environnement
1 June	Boucles de l'Aulne	Alexis Gougeard (FRA)	Ag2r–La Mondiale	Julien Simon (FRA)	Bretagne–Séché Environnement
3 August	Polynormande	Jan Ghyselinck (BEL)	Wanty–Groupe Gobert	Julien Simon (FRA)	Bretagne–Séché Environnement
24 August	Châteauroux Classic	Iljo Keisse (BEL)	Omega Pharma–Quick-Step	Julien Simon (FRA)	Bretagne–Séché Environnement
14 September	Tour du Doubs	Rein Taaramäe (EST)	Cofidis	Julien Simon (FRA)	Bretagne–Séché Environnement
21 September	Grand Prix d'Isbergues	Arnaud Démare (FRA)	FDJ.fr	Julien Simon (FRA)	Bretagne–Séché Environnement
5 October	Tour de Vendée	Armindo Fonseca (FRA)	Bretagne–Séché Environnement	Julien Simon (FRA)	Bretagne–Séché Environnement

== Final points standings ==
=== Individual ===
In order to be eligible for the classification, riders either had to be French or competed for a French-licensed team.

Pos.	Rider	Team	Points
1	Julien Simon (FRA)	Cofidis	194
2	Samuel Dumoulin (FRA)	Ag2r–La Mondiale	121
3	Yauheni Hutarovich (BLR)	Ag2r–La Mondiale	118
4	Armindo Fonseca (FRA)	Bretagne–Séché Environnement	106
5	Alexis Gougeard (FRA)	Ag2r–La Mondiale	100
6	Bryan Coquard (FRA)	Team Europcar	100
7	Baptiste Planckaert (BEL)	Roubaix–Lille Métropole	62
8	Benoît Jarrier (FRA)	Bretagne–Séché Environnement	61
9	Laurent Pichon (FRA)	FDJ.fr	60
10	Rémy Di Gregorio (FRA)	Team La Pomme Marseille 13	53

=== Young rider classification ===
In order to be eligible for the classification, riders had to be younger than 25 and either had to be French or competed for a French-licensed team.

Pos.	Rider	Team	Points
1	Armindo Fonseca (FRA)	Bretagne–Séché Environnement	106
2	Alexis Gougeard (FRA)	Ag2r–La Mondiale	100
3	Bryan Coquard (FRA)	Team Europcar	100
4	Benoît Jarrier (FRA)	Bretagne–Séché Environnement	61
5	Adrien Petit (FRA)	Cofidis	50
6	Arnaud Démare (FRA)	FDJ.fr	50
7	Nacer Bouhanni (FRA)	FDJ.fr	50
8	Flavien Dassonville (FRA)	BigMat–Auber 93	47
9	Quentin Jaurégui (FRA)	Roubaix–Lille Métropole	44
10	Olivier Le Gac (FRA)	FDJ.fr	35

=== Teams ===
Only French teams are eligible to be classified in the teams classification.

Pos.	Team	Points
1	Bretagne–Séché Environnement	141
2	Ag2r–La Mondiale	125
3	Roubaix–Lille Métropole	116
4	Cofidis	111
5	FDJ.fr	102
6	Team Europcar	99
7	Team La Pomme Marseille 13	86
8	BigMat–Auber 93	74
