= 2007 French Road Cycling Cup =

Bicycle competition

The 2007 French Road Cycling Cup was the 16th edition of the French Road Cycling Cup. It started on February 25 with the Tour du Haut Var and finished on October 11 with Paris–Bourges. Sébastien Chavanel of La Française des Jeux won the overall competition.

== Events ==
Date	Event	Winner	Team	Series leader
February 25	Tour du Haut Var	Filippo Pozzato (ITA)	Liquigas	Simon Gerrans (AUS)
March 25	Cholet-Pays de Loire	Stéphane Augé (FRA)	Cofidis	Stéphane Augé (FRA)
April 6	Route Adélie	Rémi Pauriol (FRA)	Crédit Agricole	Rémi Pauriol (FRA)
April 8	Grand Prix de Rennes	Sergiy Matveyev (UKR)	Ceramica Panaria–Navigare	Maryan Hary (FRA)
April 17	Paris–Camembert	Sébastien Joly (FRA)	La Française des Jeux	Stéphane Augé (FRA)
April 19	Grand Prix de Denain	Sébastien Chavanel (FRA)	La Française des Jeux	Stéphane Augé (FRA)
April 21	Tour du Finistère	Niels Brouzes (FRA)	Auber 93	Rémi Pauriol (FRA)
April 22	Tro-Bro Léon	Saïd Haddou (FRA)	Bouygues Telecom	Sébastien Chavanel (FRA)
May 1	Tour de Vendée	Mikel Gaztañaga Echeverria (ESP)	Agritubel	
May 17	Trophée des Grimpeurs	Anthony Geslin (FRA)	Bouygues Telecom	
June 2	Grand Prix de Plumelec-Morbihan	Simon Gerrans (AUS)	AG2R Prévoyance	Yann Huguet (FRA)
August 5	Polynormande	Benoît Vaugrenard (FRA)	Française des Jeux	Rémi Pauriol (FRA)
August 26	Châteauroux Classic	Christopher Sutton (AUS)	Cofidis	Sébastien Chavanel (FRA)
September 23	Grand Prix d'Isbergues	Martin Elmiger (SUI)	AG2R Prévoyance	Sébastien Chavanel (FRA)
October 11	Paris–Bourges	Romain Feillu (FRA)	Agritubel	Sébastien Chavanel (FRA)
