= 2018 French Road Cycling Cup =

Bicycle competition

The 2018 French Road Cycling Cup was the 27th edition of the French Road Cycling Cup. Compared to the previous season, the same 15 events were held, although the order had changed as the Grand Prix de Denain moved from mid April to mid March and thus became already the second event on the calendar.

The defending champion from the previous season was Laurent Pichon, he was succeeded by Hugo Hofstetter who did not manage to win one of the events but scored enough points to take the title.

== Events ==
Date	Event	Winner	Team	Series leader	Leading Team
28 January	Grand Prix d'Ouverture La Marseillaise	Alexandre Geniez (FRA)	AG2R La Mondiale	Alexandre Geniez (FRA)	AG2R La Mondiale
18 March	Grand Prix de Denain	Kenny Dehaes (BEL)	WB Aqua Protect Veranclassic	Kenny Dehaes (BEL)	Cofidis
24 March	Classic Loire Atlantique	Rasmus Quaade (DEN)	BHS–Almeborg Bornholm	Hugo Hofstetter (FRA)	Cofidis
30 March	Route Adélie	Silvan Dillier (SUI)	AG2R La Mondiale	Hugo Hofstetter (FRA)	AG2R La Mondiale
1 April	La Roue Tourangelle	Marc Sarreau (FRA)	Groupama–FDJ (Note: Team known as FDJ until 28 February, when they became Groupama–FDJ.)	Hugo Hofstetter (FRA)	AG2R La Mondiale
10 April	Paris–Camembert	Lilian Calmejane (FRA)	Direct Énergie	Hugo Hofstetter (FRA)	AG2R La Mondiale
14 April	Tour du Finistère	Jonathan Hivert (FRA)	Direct Énergie	Hugo Hofstetter (FRA)	AG2R La Mondiale
15 April	Tro-Bro Léon	Christophe Laporte (FRA)	Cofidis	Hugo Hofstetter (FRA)	Cofidis
26 May	Grand Prix de Plumelec-Morbihan	Andrea Pasqualon (ITA)	Wanty–Groupe Gobert	Hugo Hofstetter (FRA)	Cofidis
27 May	Boucles de l'Aulne	Kévin Le Cunff (FRA)	St. Michel–Auber93	Hugo Hofstetter (FRA)	Cofidis
5 August	Polynormande	Pierre-Luc Périchon (FRA)	Fortuneo–Samsic	Hugo Hofstetter (FRA)	Cofidis
2 September	Grand Prix de Fourmies	Pascal Ackermann (GER)	Bora–Hansgrohe	Hugo Hofstetter (FRA)	Cofidis
9 September	Tour du Doubs	Julien Simon (FRA)	Cofidis	Hugo Hofstetter (FRA)	Cofidis
23 September	Grand Prix d'Isbergues	Philippe Gilbert (BEL)	Quick-Step Floors	Hugo Hofstetter (FRA)	Cofidis
6 October	Tour de Vendée	Nico Denz (GER)	AG2R La Mondiale	Hugo Hofstetter (FRA)	Cofidis

== Race results ==
=== Grand Prix d'Ouverture La Marseillaise ===
Result
Rank	Rider	Team	Time
1	Alexandre Geniez (FRA)	AG2R La Mondiale	3h 47' 21"
2	Odd Christian Eiking (NOR)	Wanty–Groupe Gobert	+ 0"
3	Lilian Calmejane (FRA)	Direct Énergie	+ 0"
4	Jesús Herrada (ESP)	Cofidis	+ 0"
5	Guillaume Martin (FRA)	Wanty–Groupe Gobert	+ 2"
6	Rémy Di Gregorio (FRA)	Delko–Marseille Provence KTM	+ 3"
7	Valentin Madouas (FRA)	FDJ	+ 4"
8	Romain Bardet (FRA)	AG2R La Mondiale	+ 4"
9	Tony Gallopin (FRA)	AG2R La Mondiale	+ 13"
10	Dimitri Claeys (BEL)	Cofidis	+ 1' 52"
11	Aimé De Gendt (BEL)	Sport Vlaanderen–Baloise	+ 1' 52"
12	Xandro Meurisse (BEL)	Wanty–Groupe Gobert	+ 1' 52"
13	Samuel Dumoulin (FRA)	AG2R La Mondiale	+ 2' 40"
14	Yannick Martinez (FRA)	Delko–Marseille Provence KTM	+ 2' 40"
15	Patrick Müller (SUI)	Vital Concept	+ 2' 40"

=== Grand Prix de Denain ===
Result
Rank	Rider	Team	Time
1	Kenny Dehaes (BEL)	WB Aqua Protect Veranclassic	4h 33' 37"
2	Hugo Hofstetter (FRA)	Cofidis	+ 2"
3	Julien Duval (FRA)	AG2R La Mondiale	+ 2"
4	Andrea Pasqualon (ITA)	Wanty–Groupe Gobert	+ 2"
5	Bram Welten (NED)	Fortuneo–Samsic	+ 2"
6	Coen Vermeltfoort (NED)	Roompot–Nederlandse Loterij	+ 2"
7	Shane Archbold (NZL)	Aqua Blue Sport	+ 2"
8	Marc Sarreau (FRA)	Groupama–FDJ	+ 2"
9	Jimmy Turgis (FRA)	Cofidis	+ 2"
10	Adrien Petit (FRA)	Direct Énergie	+ 2"
11	Yannick Martinez (FRA)	Delko–Marseille Provence KTM	+ 2"
12	Wout van Aert (BEL)	Vérandas Willems–Crelan	+ 2"
13	Bert De Backer (BEL)	Vital Concept	+ 2"
14	Gediminas Bagdonas (LTU)	AG2R La Mondiale	+ 2"
15	Yoann Offredo (FRA)	Wanty–Groupe Gobert	+ 2"

=== Classic Loire Atlantique ===
Result
Rank	Rider	Team	Time
1	Rasmus Quaade (DEN)	BHS–Almeborg Bornholm	4h 20' 47"
2	Daniel Hoelgaard (NOR)	Groupama–FDJ	+ 3"
3	Armindo Fonseca (FRA)	Fortuneo–Samsic	+ 3"
4	Damien Touzé (FRA)	St. Michel–Auber93	+ 3"
5	Maxime Daniel (FRA)	Fortuneo–Samsic	+ 3"
6	Hugo Hofstetter (FRA)	Cofidis	+ 3"
7	Roy Jans (BEL)	Cibel–Cebon	+ 3"
8	Tim Ariesen (NED)	Roompot–Nederlandse Loterij	+ 3"
9	Samuel Dumoulin (FRA)	AG2R La Mondiale	+ 3"
10	Roman Maikin (RUS)	Gazprom–RusVelo	+ 3"
11	Léo Vincent (FRA)	Groupama–FDJ	+ 3"
12	Mikel Aristi (ESP)	Euskadi–Murias	+ 3"
13	Julien El Fares (FRA)	Delko–Marseille Provence KTM	+ 3"
14	Gian Friesecke (SUI)	Team Vorarlberg Santic	+ 3"
15	Thomas Boudat (FRA)	Direct Énergie	+ 3"

=== Route Adélie ===
Result
Rank	Rider	Team	Time
1	Silvan Dillier (SUI)	AG2R La Mondiale	4h 42' 05"
2	Benoît Vaugrenard (FRA)	Groupama–FDJ	+ 0"
3	Justin Mottier (FRA)	Vital Concept	+ 2"
4	Anthony Delaplace (FRA)	Fortuneo–Samsic	+ 3"
5	Paul Ourselin (FRA)	Direct Énergie	+ 5"
6	Ricardo Vilela (POR)	Team Manzana Postobón	+ 5"
7	Samuel Dumoulin (FRA)	AG2R La Mondiale	+ 1' 28"
8	Hugo Hofstetter (FRA)	Cofidis	+ 1' 28"
9	Anthony Maldonado (FRA)	St. Michel–Auber93	+ 1' 28"
10	Maxime Daniel (FRA)	Fortuneo–Samsic	+ 1' 28"
11	Armindo Fonseca (FRA)	Fortuneo–Samsic	+ 1' 28"
12	Joshua Huppertz (GER)	Team Lotto–Kern Haus	+ 1' 28"
13	Nicolai Brøchner (DEN)	Holowesko Citadel p/b Arapahoe Resources	+ 1' 28"
14	Daniel Hoelgaard (NOR)	Groupama–FDJ	+ 1' 28"
15	Roy Jans (BEL)	Cibel–Cebon	+ 1' 28"

=== La Roue Tourangelle ===
Result
Rank	Rider	Team	Time
1	Marc Sarreau (FRA)	Groupama–FDJ	4h 44' 33"
2	Samuel Dumoulin (FRA)	AG2R La Mondiale	+ 0"
3	Hugo Hofstetter (FRA)	Cofidis	+ 0"
4	Andrea Vendrame (ITA)	Androni Giocattoli–Sidermec	+ 0"
5	Clément Venturini (FRA)	AG2R La Mondiale	+ 0"
6	Sylvain Chavanel (FRA)	Direct Énergie	+ 0"
7	Wilmar Paredes (COL)	Team Manzana Postobón	+ 0"
8	Matthieu Ladagnous (FRA)	Groupama–FDJ	+ 0"
9	Benoît Cosnefroy (FRA)	AG2R La Mondiale	+ 3"
10	Silvan Dillier (SUI)	AG2R La Mondiale	+ 9"
11	François Bidard (FRA)	AG2R La Mondiale	+ 10"
12	Nacer Bouhanni (FRA)	Cofidis	+ 17"
13	Timothy Dupont (BEL)	Wanty–Groupe Gobert	+ 17"
14	Roy Jans (BEL)	Cibel–Cebon	+ 17"
15	Manuel Belletti (ITA)	Androni Giocattoli–Sidermec	+ 17"

=== Paris–Camembert ===
Result
Rank	Rider	Team	Time
1	Lilian Calmejane (FRA)	Direct Énergie	4h 53' 17"
2	Valentin Madouas (FRA)	Groupama–FDJ	+ 21"
3	Andrea Vendrame (ITA)	Androni Giocattoli–Sidermec	+ 21"
4	Manuel Belletti (ITA)	Androni Giocattoli–Sidermec	+ 38"
5	Damien Touzé (FRA)	St. Michel–Auber93	+ 38"
6	Davide Cimolai (ITA)	Groupama–FDJ	+ 38"
7	Matthieu Ladagnous (FRA)	Groupama–FDJ	+ 38"
8	Lorenzo Manzin (FRA)	Vital Concept	+ 38"
9	Hugo Hofstetter (FRA)	Cofidis	+ 38"
10	Laurent Pichon (FRA)	Fortuneo–Samsic	+ 38"
11	Marco Minnaard (NED)	Wanty–Groupe Gobert	+ 38"
12	Patrick Schelling (SUI)	Team Vorarlberg Santic	+ 38"
13	Daniel Hoelgaard (NOR)	Groupama–FDJ	+ 38"
14	Carl Fredrik Hagen (NOR)	Joker Icopal	+ 38"
15	Guillaume Martin (FRA)	Wanty–Groupe Gobert	+ 41"

=== Tour du Finistère ===
Result
Rank	Rider	Team	Time
1	Jonathan Hivert (FRA)	Direct Énergie	4h 43' 04"
2	Romain Bardet (FRA)	AG2R La Mondiale	+ 0"
3	Guillaume Martin (FRA)	Wanty–Groupe Gobert	+ 0"
4	Nicolas Edet (FRA)	Cofidis	+ 0"
5	Jimmy Janssens (BEL)	Cibel–Cebon	+ 0"
6	Jérémy Cornu (FRA)	Direct Énergie	+ 0"
7	Fabien Grellier (FRA)	Direct Énergie	+ 0"
8	Tejay van Garderen (USA)	BMC Racing Team	+ 0"
9	Carl Fredrik Hagen (NOR)	Joker Icopal	+ 0"
10	Lilian Calmejane (FRA)	Direct Énergie	+ 7"
11	Warren Barguil (FRA)	Fortuneo–Samsic	+ 7"
12	Kévin Le Cunff (FRA)	St. Michel–Auber93	+ 7"
13	Julien Antomarchi (FRA)	Roubaix–Lille Métropole	+ 7"
14	Daniel Navarro (ESP)	Cofidis	+ 7"
15	Paul Ourselin (FRA)	Direct Énergie	+ 31"

=== Tro-Bro Léon ===
Result
Rank	Rider	Team	Time
1	Christophe Laporte (FRA)	Cofidis	5h 12' 07"
2	Damien Gaudin (FRA)	Direct Énergie	+ 4"
3	Jelle Mannaerts (BEL)	Tarteletto–Isorex	+ 16"
4	Hugo Hofstetter (FRA)	Cofidis	+ 16"
5	Rasmus Tiller (NOR)	Joker Icopal	+ 16"
6	Olivier Le Gac (FRA)	Groupama–FDJ	+ 16"
7	Mikel Aristi (ESP)	Euskadi–Murias	+ 16"
8	Jonas Rickaert (BEL)	Sport Vlaanderen–Baloise	+ 16"
9	Mauro Finetto (ITA)	Delko–Marseille Provence KTM	+ 16"
10	Stijn Vandenbergh (BEL)	AG2R La Mondiale	+ 16"
11	Zakkari Dempster (AUS)	Israel Cycling Academy	+ 16"
12	Frederik Backaert (BEL)	Wanty–Groupe Gobert	+ 16"
13	Laurent Pichon (FRA)	Fortuneo–Samsic	+ 27"
14	Cyril Gautier (FRA)	AG2R La Mondiale	+ 41"
15	Matthieu Ladagnous (FRA)	Groupama–FDJ	+ 1' 22"

=== Grand Prix de Plumelec-Morbihan ===
Result
Rank	Rider	Team	Time
1	Andrea Pasqualon (ITA)	Wanty–Groupe Gobert	4h 27' 42"
2	Julien Simon (FRA)	Cofidis	+ 0"
3	Samuel Dumoulin (FRA)	AG2R La Mondiale	+ 0"
4	Arthur Vichot (FRA)	Groupama–FDJ	+ 0"
5	Alexis Vuillermoz (FRA)	AG2R La Mondiale	+ 0"
6	Jesús Herrada (ESP)	Cofidis	+ 3"
7	Garikoitz Bravo (ESP)	Euskadi–Murias	+ 10"
8	Romain Hardy (FRA)	Fortuneo–Samsic	+ 14"
9	Sergey Firsanov (RUS)	Gazprom–RusVelo	+ 17"
10	Jonathan Lastra (ESP)	Caja Rural–Seguros RGA	+ 18"
11	Thomas Joly (FRA)	Roubaix–Lille Métropole	+ 18"
12	Victor Lafay (FRA)	France (national team)	+ 18"
13	Erwann Corbel (FRA)	Fortuneo–Samsic	+ 18"
14	Luis Ángel Maté (ESP)	Cofidis	+ 22"
15	Roman Maikin (RUS)	Gazprom–RusVelo	+ 22"

=== Boucles de l'Aulne ===
Result
Rank	Rider	Team	Time
1	Kévin Le Cunff (FRA)	St. Michel–Auber93	4h 24' 12"
2	Arthur Vichot (FRA)	Groupama–FDJ	+ 2"
3	Guillaume Martin (FRA)	Wanty–Groupe Gobert	+ 4"
4	Julien Antomarchi (FRA)	Roubaix–Lille Métropole	+ 4"
5	Xandro Meurisse (BEL)	Wanty–Groupe Gobert	+ 4"
6	Andrea Pasqualon (ITA)	Wanty–Groupe Gobert	+ 4"
7	Romain Hardy (FRA)	Fortuneo–Samsic	+ 4"
8	Jesús Herrada (ESP)	Cofidis	+ 4"
9	Thomas Degand (BEL)	Wanty–Groupe Gobert	+ 8"
10	Stijn Vandenbergh (BEL)	AG2R La Mondiale	+ 8"
11	Sergey Firsanov (RUS)	Gazprom–RusVelo	+ 8"
12	Ildar Arslanov (RUS)	Gazprom–RusVelo	+ 8"
13	Garikoitz Bravo (ESP)	Euskadi–Murias	+ 10"
14	Alexis Gougeard (FRA)	AG2R La Mondiale	+ 10"
15	Luis Ángel Maté (ESP)	Cofidis	+ 22"

=== Poly Normande ===
Result
Rank	Rider	Team	Time
1	Pierre-Luc Périchon (FRA)	Fortuneo–Samsic	4h 05' 22"
2	Pierre Gouault (FRA)	Roubaix–Lille Métropole	+ 0"
3	Lorrenzo Manzin (FRA)	Vital Concept	+ 8"
4	Hugo Hofstetter (FRA)	Cofidis	+ 8"
5	Connor Swift (GB)	Madison Genesis	+ 8"
6	Samuel Dumoulin (FRA)	AG2R La Mondiale	+ 8"
7	Kevin van Melsen (BEL)	Wanty–Groupe Gobert	+ 8"
8	Flavien Maurelet (FRA)	St. Michel–Auber93	+ 8"
9	Clément Russo (FRA)	Fortuneo–Samsic	+ 8"
10	Jimmy Turgis (FRA)	Cofidis	+ 8"
11	Kevyn Ista (BEL)	WB Aqua Protect Veranclassic	+ 8"
12	Aksel Nõmmela (EST)	BEAT Cycling Club	+ 8"
13	Valentin Madouas (FRA)	Groupama–FDJ	+ 8"
14	Jimmy Raibaud (FRA)	Groupama–FDJ	+ 8"
15	Damien Touzé (FRA)	St. Michel–Auber93	+ 8"

=== Grand Prix de Fourmies ===
Result
Rank	Rider	Team	Time

=== Tour du Doubs ===
Result
Rank	Rider	Team	Time

=== Grand Prix d'Isbergues ===
Result
Rank	Rider	Team	Time

=== Tour de Vendée ===
Result
Rank	Rider	Team	Time

== Cup standings ==
=== Individual ===
All competing riders are eligible for this classification.

Pos.	Rider	Team	Points
1	Hugo Hofstetter (FRA)	Cofidis	151
2	Samuel Dumoulin (FRA)	AG2R La Mondiale	121
3	Christophe Laporte (FRA)	Cofidis	103
4	Lilian Calmejane (FRA)	Direct Énergie	89
5	Guillaume Martin (FRA)	Wanty–Groupe Gobert	88
6	Andrea Pasqualon (ITA)	Wanty–Groupe Gobert	86
7	Julien Simon (FRA)	Cofidis	85
8	Silvan Dillier (SUI)	AG2R La Mondiale	74
9	Kévin Le Cunff (FRA)	St. Michel–Auber93	73
10	Valentin Madouas (FRA)	Groupama–FDJ	68

=== Young rider classification ===
All riders younger than 25 are eligible for this classification.

Pos.	Rider	Team	Points
1	Hugo Hofstetter (FRA)	Cofidis	151
2	Guillaume Martin (FRA)	Wanty–Groupe Gobert	88
3	Valentin Madouas (FRA)	Groupama–FDJ	68
4	Marc Sarreau (FRA)	Groupama–FDJ	62
5	Nico Denz (GER)	AG2R La Mondiale	50
6	Pascal Ackermann (GER)	Bora–Hansgrohe	50
7	Andrea Vendrame (ITA)	Androni Giocattoli–Sidermec	45
8	Daniel Hoelgaard (NOR)	Groupama–FDJ	41
9	Damien Touzé (FRA)	St. Michel–Auber93	41
10	Lennert Teugels (BEL)	Cibel–Cebon	35

=== Teams ===
Only French teams are eligible to be classified in the teams classification.

Pos.	Team	Points
1	Cofidis	133
2	AG2R La Mondiale	126
3	Groupama–FDJ	113
4	Fortuneo–Samsic	97
5	St. Michel–Auber93	94
6	Direct Énergie	83
7	Delko–Marseille Provence KTM	64
8	Vital Concept	61
9	Roubaix–Lille Métropole	53
