= 2009 French Road Cycling Cup =

Bicycle competition

The 2009 French Road Cycling Cup was the 18th edition of the French Road Cycling Cup. The 2009 calendar saw a reduction in events from 14 to 11, with the Tour du Haut Var, the Grand Prix de Rennes and Paris–Bourges losing their places on the calendar. The defending champion was Jérôme Pineau, who won the series for Bouygues Télécom but moved on to the Belgian team Quick-Step, and so did not feature much in the series. French rider Jimmy Casper of Besson Chaussures–Sojasun won the series, having led it throughout and winning three races.

== Events ==
| Date | Event | Winner | Team | Series leader |
|---|---|---|---|---|
| 22 March | Cholet-Pays de Loire | Juan José Haedo (ARG) | Team Saxo Bank | Jimmy Casper (FRA) |
| 14 April | Paris–Camembert | Jimmy Casper (FRA) | Besson Chaussures–Sojasun | Jimmy Casper (FRA) |
| 16 April | Grand Prix de Denain | Jimmy Casper (FRA) | Besson Chaussures–Sojasun | Jimmy Casper (FRA) |
| 18 April | Tour du Finistère | Dimitri Champion (FRA) | Bretagne–Schuller | Jimmy Casper (FRA) |
| 19 April | Tro-Bro Léon | Saïd Haddou (FRA) | Bbox Bouygues Telecom | Jimmy Casper (FRA) |
| 3 May | Trophée des Grimpeurs | Thomas Voeckler (FRA) | Bbox Bouygues Telecom | Jimmy Casper (FRA) |
| 30 May | Grand Prix de Plumelec-Morbihan | Jérémie Galland (FRA) | Besson Chaussures–Sojasun | Jimmy Casper (FRA) |
| 2 August | Polynormande | Mathieu Ladagnous (FRA) | Française des Jeux | Jimmy Casper (FRA) |
| 30 August | Châteauroux Classic | Jimmy Casper (FRA) | Besson Chaussures–Sojasun | Jimmy Casper (FRA) |
| 20 September | Grand Prix d'Isbergues | Benoît Vaugrenard (FRA) | Française des Jeux | Jimmy Casper (FRA) |
| 4 October | Tour de Vendée | Pavel Brutt (RUS) | Team Katusha | Jimmy Casper (FRA) |
