= 2008 French Road Cycling Cup =

Bicycle competition

The 2008 French Road Cycling Cup is the 17th edition of the French Road Cycling Cup. It started on February 24 with the Tour du Haut Var and finished on October 9 with Paris–Bourges. Jérôme Pineau of Bouygues Télécom won the overall competition, despite not winning any of the races.

== Events ==
Date	Event	Winner	Team	Series leader
February 24	Tour du Haut Var	Davide Rebellin (ITA)	Gerolsteiner	Rinaldo Nocentini (ITA)
March 23	Cholet-Pays de Loire	Janek Tombak (EST)	Mitsubishi–Jartazi	Rinaldo Nocentini (ITA)
April 6	Grand Prix de Rennes	Mikhaylo Khalilov (UKR)	Ceramica Flaminia–Bossini Docce	Jimmy Casper (FRA)
April 15	Paris–Camembert	Alejandro Valverde (ESP)	Caisse d'Epargne	Jérôme Pineau (FRA)
April 17	Grand Prix de Denain	Edvald Boasson Hagen (NOR)	Team High Road	Jimmy Casper (FRA)
April 19	Tour du Finistère	David Lelay (FRA)	Bretagne–Armor Lux	Jimmy Casper (FRA)
April 20	Tro-Bro Léon	Frédéric Guesdon (FRA)	Française des Jeux	Jimmy Casper (FRA)
May 4	Trophée des Grimpeurs	David Lelay (FRA)	Bretagne–Armor Lux	David Lelay (FRA)
May 31	Grand Prix de Plumelec-Morbihan	Thomas Voeckler (FRA)	Bouygues Télécom	David Lelay (FRA)
August 3	Polynormande	Arnaud Gérard (FRA)	Française des Jeux	Jérôme Pineau (FRA)
August 31	Châteauroux Classic	Anthony Ravard (FRA)	Agritubel	Jérôme Pineau (FRA)
September 21	Grand Prix d'Isbergues	William Bonnet (FRA)	Crédit Agricole	Jérôme Pineau (FRA)
October 5	Tour de Vendée	Koldo Fernández (ESP)	Euskaltel–Euskadi	Jérôme Pineau (FRA)
October 9	Paris–Bourges	Bernhard Eisel (AUT)	Team Columbia	Jérôme Pineau (FRA)
