= 2023 Grand Prix de Fourmies =

2023 UCI ProSeries

Race details
- Dates: 10 September 2023
- Stages: 1
- Distance: 197.6 km (122.8 mi)
- Winning time: 4h 25' 34"

Results
	Winner	Tim Merlier (BEL)	(Soudal–Quick-Step)
	Second	Gerben Thijssen (BEL)	(Intermarché–Circus–Wanty)
	Third	Matteo Moschetti (ITA)	(Q36.5 Pro Cycling Team)

The 2023 Grand Prix de Fourmies was the 90th edition of the Grand Prix de Fourmies, a one-day road cycling race in and around Fourmies in northern France. It was also the fifteenth event of the 2023 French Road Cycling Cup.

== Teams ==
Ten of the eighteen UCI WorldTeams, ten UCI ProTeams, and four UCI Continental teams made up the twenty-five teams that participated in the race.

UCI WorldTeams

- Alpecin–Deceuninck
- AG2R Citroën Team
- Arkéa–Samsic
- Cofidis
- EF Education–EasyPost
- Groupama–FDJ
- Intermarché–Circus–Wanty
- Soudal–Quick-Step
- Team Jayco–AlUla
- UAE Team Emirates

UCI ProTeams

- Bingoal WB
- Eolo–Kometa
- Human Powered Health
- Israel–Premier Tech
- Lotto–Dstny
- Q36.5 Pro Cycling Team
- Team Corratec–Selle Italia
- Team Flanders–Baloise
- Team TotalEnergies
- Uno-X Pro Cycling Team

UCI Continental Teams

- Van Rysel–Roubaix–Lille Métropole
- Nice Métropole Côte d'Azur
- St. Michel–Mavic–Auber93
- CIC U Nantes Atlantique

== Result ==
Result
Rank	Rider	Team	Time
1	Tim Merlier (BEL)	Soudal–Quick-Step	4h 25' 34"
2	Gerben Thijssen (BEL)	Intermarché–Circus–Wanty	+ 0"
2	Matteo Moschetti (ITA)	Q36.5 Pro Cycling Team	+ 0"
4	Alexander Kristoff (NOR)	Uno-X Pro Cycling Team	+ 0"
5	Paul Penhoët (FRA)	Groupama–FDJ	+ 0"
6	Niccolò Bonifazio (ITA)	Intermarché–Circus–Wanty	+ 0"
7	Arnaud Démare (FRA)	Arkéa–Samsic	+ 0"
8	Álvaro Hodeg (COL)	UAE Team Emirates	+ 0"
9	Arne Marit (BEL)	Intermarché–Circus–Wanty	+ 0"
10	Jason Tesson (FRA)	Team TotalEnergies	+ 0"
