= Balestri =

Balestri is an Italian surname. Notable people with the surname include:

- Andrea Balestri (born 1963), Italian actor
- Daniele Balestri (born 1978), Italian cyclist
- Iacopo Balestri (born 1975), Italian footballer
- Marco Balestri (born 1953), Italian author and radio talk show host
