= 2020 French Road Cycling Cup =

Bicycle competition

The 2020 French Road Cycling Cup was the 29th edition of the French Road Cycling Cup. Compared to the previous season, the same 15 events were held. The cup was heavily impacted by the COVID-19 pandemic in France, as originally 16 races were scheduled, but only 8 were eventually held, including some replacement events. The defending champion from the previous season was Marc Sarreau, he was succeeded by Nacer Bouhanni who won two events.

== Events ==
The calendar was heavily disturbed due to the COVID-19 pandemic. To obtain a reasonable number of events, replacement races were included in the calendar, such as the 1st stage of the Route d'Occitanie and the 4th stage of the Tour Poitou-Charentes en Nouvelle-Aquitaine. A notable race added was also the sprinters' classic Paris–Tours.

| Date | Event | Winner | Team | Series leader(s) | Leading Team |
|---|---|---|---|---|---|
| 2 February | Grand Prix d'Ouverture La Marseillaise | Benoît Cosnefroy (FRA) | AG2R La Mondiale | Benoit Cosnefroy (FRA) | AG2R La Mondiale |
| 1 August | Route d'Occitanie (1st stage) | Bryan Coquard (FRA) | B&B Hotels–Vital Concept | Benoit Cosnefroy (FRA); Bryan Coquard (FRA) | AG2R La Mondiale |
| 29 August | Tour Poitou-Charentes en Nouvelle-Aquitaine (4th stage) | Josef Černý (CZE) | Circus–Wanty Gobert | Josef Černý (CZE) | AG2R La Mondiale |
| 6 September | Tour du Doubs | Loïc Vliegen (BEL) | Circus–Wanty Gobert | Josef Černý (CZE) | AG2R La Mondiale |
| 20 September | Grand Prix d'Isbergues | Nacer Bouhanni (FRA) | Arkéa–Samsic | Josef Černý (CZE) | AG2R La Mondiale |
| 22 September | Paris–Camembert | Dorian Godon (FRA) | AG2R La Mondiale | Nacer Bouhanni (FRA) | AG2R La Mondiale |
| 27 September | Paris–Chauny | Nacer Bouhanni (FRA) | Arkéa–Samsic | Nacer Bouhanni (FRA) | AG2R La Mondiale |
| 11 October | Paris–Tours | Casper Pedersen (DEN) | Team Sunweb | Nacer Bouhanni (FRA) | AG2R La Mondiale |

== Final Cup standings ==
=== Individual ===
All competing riders are eligible for this classification.

| Pos. | Rider | Team | Points |
|---|---|---|---|
| 1 | Nacer Bouhanni (FRA) | Arkéa–Samsic | 125 |
| 2 | Benoît Cosnefroy (FRA) | AG2R La Mondiale | 85 |
| 3 | Josef Černý (CZE) | Circus–Wanty Gobert | 64 |
| 4 | Alexander Krieger (GER) | Alpecin–Fenix | 58 |
| 5 | Valentin Madouas (FRA) | Groupama–FDJ | 55 |
| 6 | Casper Pedersen (DEN) | Team Sunweb | 50 |
| 7 | Bryan Coquard (FRA) | B&B Hotels–Vital Concept | 50 |
| 8 | Dorian Godon (FRA) | AG2R La Mondiale | 50 |
| 9 | Loïc Vliegen (BEL) | Circus–Wanty Gobert | 50 |
| 10 | Maurits Lammertink (NED) | Circus–Wanty Gobert | 45 |

=== Young rider classification ===
All riders younger than 25 are eligible for this classification.

| Pos. | Rider | Team | Points |
|---|---|---|---|
| 1 | Benoît Cosnefroy (FRA) | AG2R La Mondiale | 85 |
| 2 | Valentin Madouas (FRA) | Groupama–FDJ | 55 |
| 3 | Casper Pedersen (DEN) | Team Sunweb | 50 |
| 4 | Dorian Godon (FRA) | AG2R La Mondiale | 50 |
| 5 | Luca Mozzato (ITA) | B&B Hotels–Vital Concept | 36 |
| 6 | Biniam Girmay (ERI) | Nippo–Delko–One Provence | 35 |
| 7 | Joris Nieuwenhuis (NED) | Team Sunweb | 25 |
| 8 | Aurélien Paret-Peintre (FRA) | AG2R La Mondiale | 25 |
| 9 | Edward Planckaert (BEL) | Sport Vlaanderen–Baloise | 21 |
| 10 | Jérémy Lecroq (FRA) | B&B Hotels–Vital Concept | 20 |

=== Teams ===
Only French teams are eligible to be classified in the teams classification.

| Pos. | Team | Points |
|---|---|---|
| 1 | AG2R La Mondiale | 72 |
| 2 | Arkéa–Samsic | 59 |
| 3 | Nippo–Delko–One Provence | 53 |
| 4 | Groupama–FDJ | 51 |
| 5 | Natura4Ever–Roubaix–Lille Métropole | 50 |
| 6 | B&B Hotels–Vital Concept | 45 |
| 7 | Cofidis | 43 |
| 8 | Total Direct Énergie | 40 |
| 9 | St. Michel–Auber93 | 35 |
