= 2006 French Road Cycling Cup =

Bicycle competition

The 2006 French Road Cycling Cup was the 15th edition of the French Road Cycling Cup. It started on February 18 with the Tour du Haut Var and finished on October 5 with Paris–Bourges. Lloyd Mondory of AG2R Prévoyance won the overall competition.

== Events ==
Date	Event	Winner	Team
February 18	Tour du Haut Var	Leonardo Bertagnolli (ITA)	Cofidis
February 19	Classic Haribo	Arnaud Coyot (FRA)	Cofidis
March 19	Cholet-Pays de Loire	Christopher Sutton (AUS)	Cofidis
March 31	Route Adélie	Samuel Dumoulin (FRA)	AG2R Prévoyance
April 2	Grand Prix de Rennes	Paride Grillo (ITA)	Ceramica Panaria–Navigare
April 13	Grand Prix de Denain	Jimmy Casper (FRA)	Cofidis
April 16	Tro-Bro Léon	Mark Renshaw (AUS)	Crédit Agricole
April 18	Paris–Camembert	Anthony Geslin (FRA)	Bouygues Télécom
April 22	Grand Prix de Villers-Cotterêts	Émilien-Benoît Bergès (FRA)	Auber 93
April 30	Trophée des Grimpeurs	Didier Rous (FRA)	Bouygues Télécom
May 25	Tour de Vendée	Mikel Gaztañaga Echeverria (ESP)	Atom
July 30	Polynormande	Anthony Charteau (FRA)	Crédit Agricole
September 17	Grand Prix d'Isbergues	Cédric Vasseur (FRA)	Quick-Step–Innergetic
October 5	Paris–Bourges	Thomas Voeckler (FRA)	Bouygues Télécom
