= Chavanel =

Chavanel is a surname. Notable people with the surname include:

- Sébastien Chavanel (born 1981), French cyclist, brother of Sylvain
- Sylvain Chavanel (born 1979), French cyclist
