= 2023 French Road Cycling Cup =

Bicycle competition

The 2023 French Road Cycling Cup was the 32nd edition of the French Road Cycling Cup. The cup consisted of the same 17 events as the prior year.

The defending champions from the previous season were Julien Simon, who won the individual classification, Luca Mozzato who won the young rider classification, and Team TotalEnergies who won the teams classification.

== Final standings ==
All competing riders are eligible for the individual general classification, but only those younger than 25 on 1 January 2022 are eligible for the young rider classification. Additionally, only French teams are eligible for the teams classification.

=== Individual ===
Pos.	Rider	Team	Points
1	Paul Penhoët (FRA)	Groupama–FDJ	166
2	Arnaud De Lie (BEL)	Lotto–Dstny	135
3	Valentin Ferron (FRA)	Team TotalEnergies	120
4	Axel Zingle (FRA)	Cofidis	120
5	Clément Venturini (FRA)	AG2R Citroën Team	114
6	Laurence Pithie (NZL)	Groupama–FDJ	103
7	Arnaud Démare (FRA)	Arkéa–Samsic	89
8	Matteo Moschetti (ITA)	Q36.5 Pro Cycling Team	75
9	Fredrik Dversnes (NOR)	Uno-X Pro Cycling Team	75
10	Jesús Herrada (ESP)	Cofidis	73

=== Young rider classification ===
Pos.	Rider	Team	Points
1	Paul Penhoët (FRA)	Groupama–FDJ	166
2	Arnaud De Lie (BEL)	Lotto–Dstny	135
3	Valentin Ferron (FRA)	Team TotalEnergies	120
4	Axel Zingle (FRA)	Cofidis	120
5	Laurence Pithie (NZL)	Groupama–FDJ	103
6	Gerben Thijssen (BEL)	Intermarché–Circus–Wanty	70
7	Florian Vermeersch (BEL)	Lotto–Dstny	57
8	Romain Grégoire (FRA)	Groupama–FDJ	53
9	Kévin Vauquelin (FRA)	Arkéa–Samsic	45
10	Louis Barré (FRA)	Arkéa–Samsic	45

=== Teams ===
Pos.	Team	Points
1	Cofidis	144
2	Groupama–FDJ	134
3	Arkéa–Samsic	115
4	AG2R Citroën Team	114
5	Team TotalEnergies	112
6	CIC U Nantes Atlantique	107
7	St. Michel–Mavic–Auber93	107
8	Van Rysel–Roubaix–Lille Métropole	52
9	Nice Métropole Côte d'Azur	44
