= Anthony Geslin =

French cyclist (born 1980)

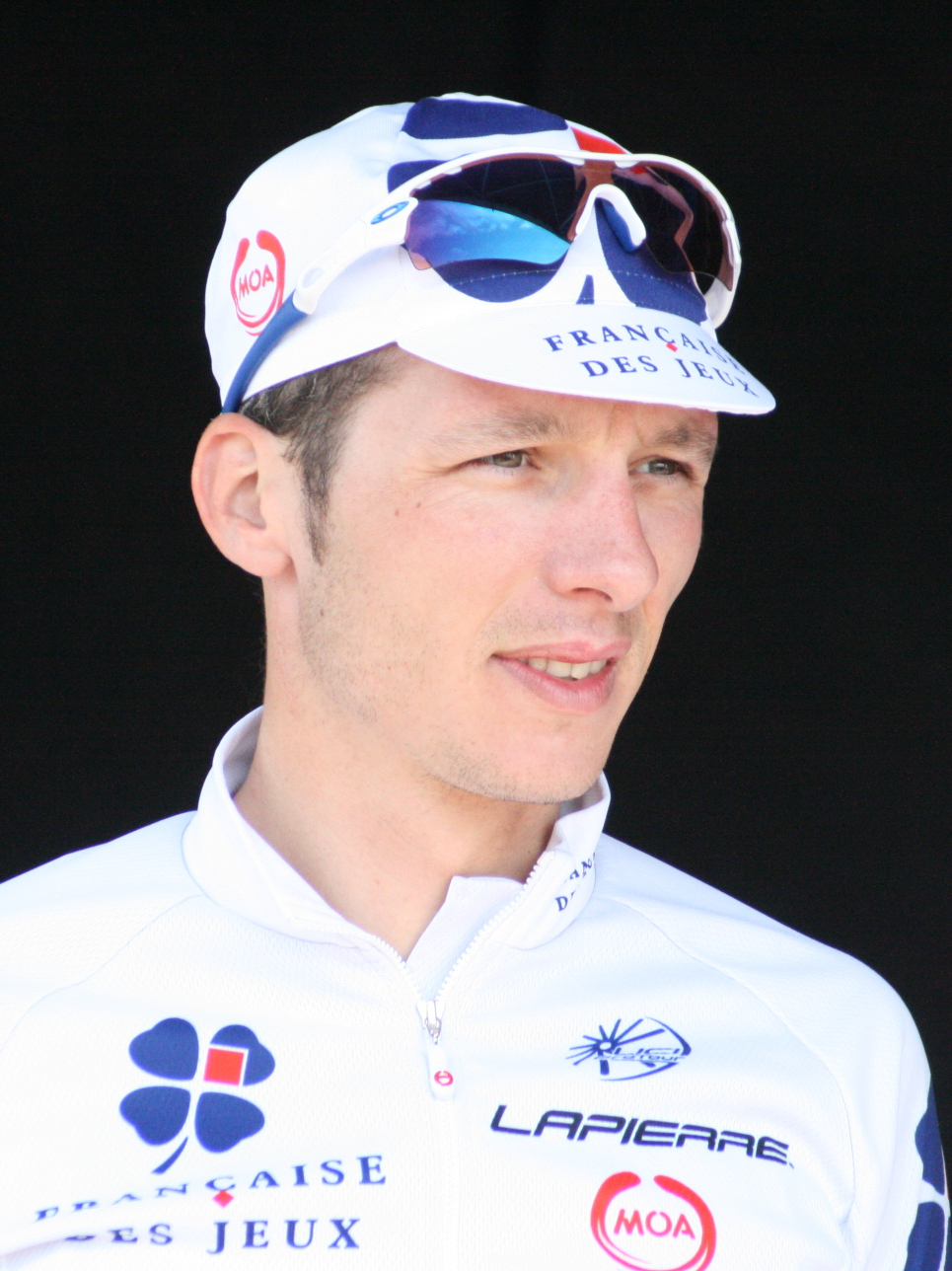
- Geslin at the 2010 Four Days of Dunkirk

Personal information
- Full name: Anthony Geslin
- Born: 9 June 1980 (age 46) Alençon, France
- Height: 1.80 m (5 ft 11 in)
- Weight: 68 kg (150 lb)

Cycling career
- Sport: Cycling
- Current team: Retired
- Discipline: Road
- Role: Rider
- Rider type: Rouleur

Professional teams
- 2002–2008: Bonjour
- 2009–2015: Française des Jeux

Major wins
- One-day races and Classics Brabantse Pijl (2009)
Medal record
Representing France
Men's road bicycle racing
World Championships
Bronze medal – third place	2005 Madrid	Men's road race

Anthony Geslin (born 9 June 1980) is a French retired professional road bicycle racer, who rode professionally between 2002 and 2015, for the Bouygues Télécom and FDJ teams. Born in Alençon, Geslin won a bronze medal in the road race at the 2005 UCI Road World Championships.

== Major results ==
1998
1st Overall Trofeo Karlsberg
2000
2nd La Côte Picarde
2001
2nd La Côte Picarde
9th Classic Loire Atlantique
2002
4th Grand Prix de la Ville de Lillers
7th Overall Tour de Picardie
9th Tro-Bro Léon
9th Paris–Bourges
2003
1st Overall Criterium des Espoirs
2nd Grand Prix Rudy Dhaenens
2nd GP Ouest–France
4th Tour de Vendée
5th Polynormande
8th Grand Prix de la Ville de Lillers
10th Overall Four Days of Dunkirk
10th Paris–Camembert
10th Grand Prix de Denain
10th Grand Prix de Wallonie
2004
1st Route Adélie de Vitré
5th Omloop van de Vlaamse Scheldeboorden
7th Overall Tour du Poitou-Charentes
9th Grand Prix de Rennes
2005
1st Stage 3 Circuit de Lorraine
3rd Road race, UCI Road World Championships
5th Châteauroux Classic
8th Paris–Camembert
2006
1st Paris–Camembert
3rd Grand Prix d'Ouverture La Marseillaise
3rd Route Adélie
2007
1st Trophée des Grimpeurs
9th Polynormande
2008
1st Tour du Doubs
3rd Tour de Vendée
4th Tour du Haut Var
6th Milan–San Remo
8th Overall Paris–Corrèze
2009
1st Brabantse Pijl
2nd Road race, National Road Championships
2nd Trophée des Grimpeurs
3rd Tour du Finistère
6th Grand Prix d'Isbergues
8th Paris–Camembert
2010
4th Grand Prix Pino Cerami
9th Overall Four Days of Dunkirk
2011
3rd Brabantse Pijl
5th Tour du Doubs
6th Classic Loire Atlantique
7th Overall Tour du Limousin
8th Overall Paris–Corrèze
2012
6th Overall Tour du Limousin
2013
2nd Overall Tour de Wallonie
2nd Grand Prix de Plumelec-Morbihan
3rd Overall French Road Cycling Cup
3rd Tour du Finistère
3rd Tro-Bro Léon
6th Paris–Camembert
8th Classic Loire Atlantique
8th Tour du Doubs
2014
4th La Roue Tourangelle
2015
8th Paris–Camembert
