= Leonardo Duque =

Colombian cyclist

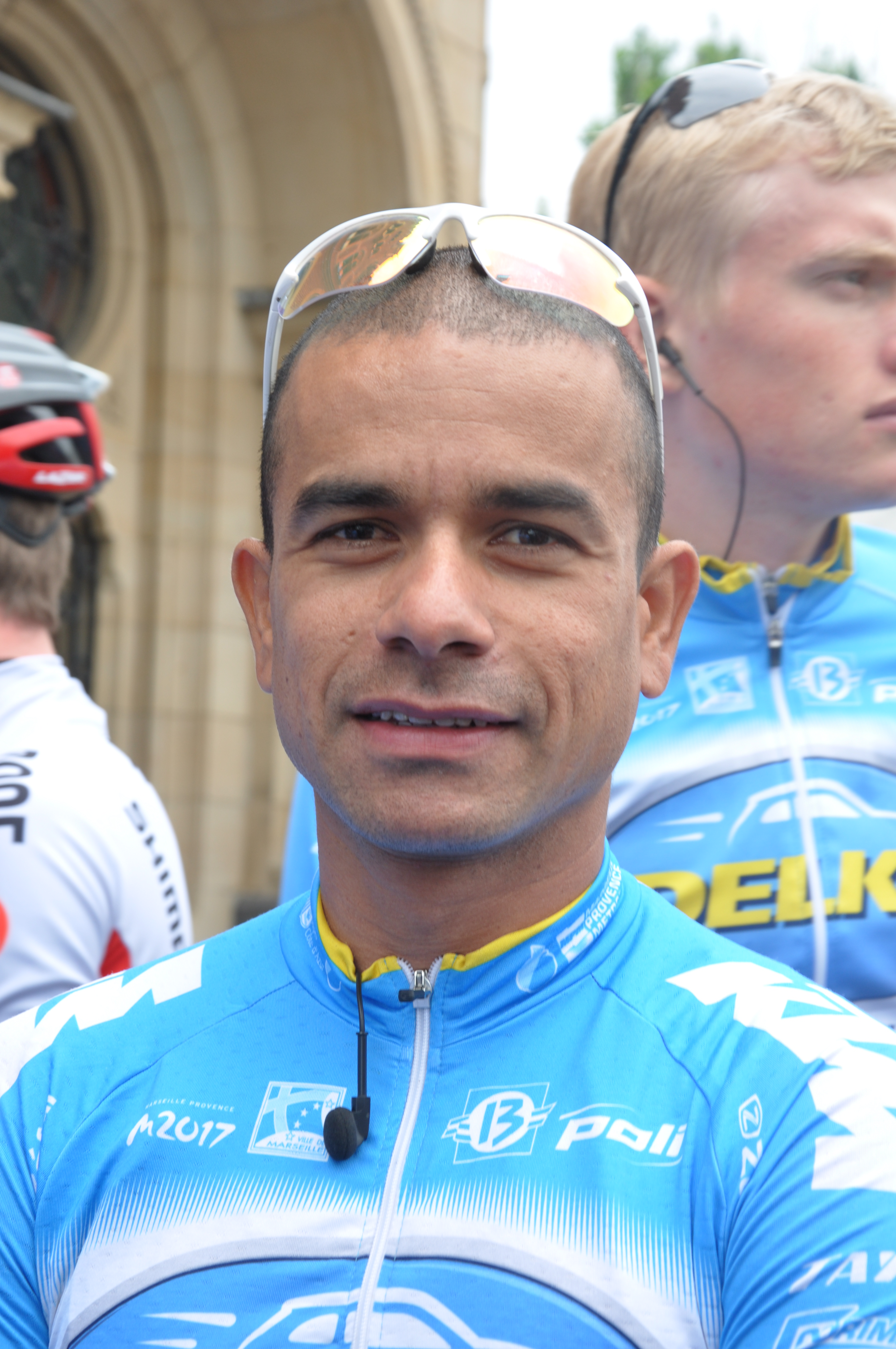
- Duque during the 2016 Rund um Köln

Personal information
- Full name: Leonardo Fabio Duque
- Born: April 10, 1980 (age 46) Cali, Valle del Cauca, Colombia
- Height: 170 cm (5 ft 7 in)
- Weight: 59 kg (130 lb)

Cycling career
- Sport: Cycling
- Disciplines: Road; Track (former)
- Role: Rider
- Rider type: Sprinter

Amateur teams
- 2003: Aguardiente Antioqueño-Lotería de Medellín
- 2004: Chocolade Jacques–Wincor Nixdorf (stagiaire)

Professional teams
- 2004–2005: Jartazi Granville Team
- 2006–2012: Cofidis
- 2013–2015: Colombia
- 2016: Delko–Marseille Provence KTM

Major wins
- Grand Tours Vuelta a España 1 individual stage (2007)
Medal record
Representing Colombia
Pan American Games
Silver medal – second place	2003 Santo Domingo	Madison
Bronze medal – third place	2003 Santo Domingo	Points race

Leonardo Fabio Duque (born April 10, 1980) is a French-Colombian professional road racing cyclist, who last rode for the Delko team. After stage 19 of the 2009 Tour de France, Duque was named the most combative rider of the stage after aggressively pacing a breakaway. In 2011 he became the first Colombian-born cyclist to finish the cobbled One Day Cycling Monuments, the Tour of Flanders and Paris–Roubaix. He also competed in the men's Madison at the 2004 Summer Olympics.

== Career achievements ==
=== Major results ===
2001
2nd Team pursuit, UCI Track World Cup
2003
National Track Championships

1st Points race
1st Madison
1st Scratch race

Pan American Games

2nd Madison
3rd Points race

Vuelta a Guatemala

1st Stages 6 & 11

2004
1st GP de la Ville de Pérenchies
1st Stage 3 Vuelta a Colombia
2005
1st Druivenkoers
1st Stage 2 Tour de l'Ain
2006
1st Overall Tour du Limousin
6th Paris–Camembert
2007
1st Stage 16 Vuelta a España
3rd Boucles de l'Aulne
2008
1st Stage 4 Tour Méditerranéen
7th GP Miguel Indurain
2009
4th Trofeo Calvia
5th Paris–Camembert
2010
1st Overall French Road Cycling Cup
1st Cholet-Pays de Loire
2nd Tour du Finistère
3rd Tour du Doubs
4th GP Ouest–France
5th Paris–Camembert
7th Grand Prix Cycliste de Montréal
2011
4th Gran Premio dell'Insubria-Lugano
5th Gran Premio di Lugano
7th Tour de la Somme
2012
3rd Overall Tour de Picardie
4th E3 Harelbeke
2013
1st Gran Premio Bruno Beghelli
1st Stage 1 Tour de l'Ain
6th Roma Maxima
10th Grand Prix de Fourmies
2014
1st Sprints classification, Giro del Trentino
2015
5th Gran Premio Bruno Beghelli
8th Coppa Sabatini
2016
1st Overall Tour of Taihu Lake

1st Stage 7

7th Paris–Camembert
7th Tour of Yancheng Coastal Wetlands
10th Overall Tour of Hainan

=== Grand Tour general classification results timeline ===
Grand Tour	2006	2007	2008	2009	2010	2011	2012	2013	2014	2015	2016
Giro d'Italia	47	—	—	—	63	—	—	79	78	—	—
Tour de France	—	—	53	94	—	121	—	—	—	—	—
Vuelta a España	80	53	67	32	—	—	80	—	—	60	—

Legend
—	Did not compete
DNF	Did not finish
