= French Road Cycling Cup =

Bicycle competition

- Current season, competition or edition: 2025 French Road Cycling Cup
- Sport: Road bicycle racing
- Founded: 1992
- Country: France
- Most recent champion: Clément Venturini (2025)
- Most titles: Samuel Dumoulin (3 wins)

The French Road Cycling Cup (English for Coupe de France de cyclisme sur route) is a road bicycle racing competition under the Fédération Francaise de Cyclisme (French Cycling Federation) each year since 1992. It consists of several one-day races in France each year. Each of these races is open for all riders, but until 2015 only French riders and riders who were part of a French team were able to score points for the French Road Cycling Cup. As of 2016, all riders score points. The team competition remains a contest between the French teams only.

== Points system ==
For the individual rankings, points are awarded to all eligible riders in each race according to the following table:

Points distribution
Position	1	2	3	4	5	6	7	8	9	10	11	12	13	14	15
Points	50	35	25	20	18	16	14	12	10	8	6	5	3	3	3

Each race, the positions of the first three riders of each French team are added to give the team position. The team with the lowest team position is the winner of the team competition for that race. E.g.: a team having their first three riders all on the podium will have a team position score of 1+2+3=6 and since no other team will have a lower team position, this team will win 12 points for the team standings. Note that only French teams can score points.

Team points distribution
Position	1	2	3	4	5	6	7	8	9	10
Points	12	9	8	7	6	5	4	3	2	1

== Winners ==
=== Individual ===
Year	Country	Rider	Team
1992	France	Jean-Cyril Robin	Castorama
1993	France	Thierry Claveyrolat	GAN
1994	France	Ronan Pensec	Novemail-Histor
1995	France	Armand De Las Cuevas	Castorama
1996	France	Stéphane Heulot	GAN
1997	France	Nicolas Jalabert	Cofidis
1998	France	Pascal Lino	BigMat–Auber 93
1999	Estonia	Jaan Kirsipuu	Casino–Ag2r Prévoyance
2000	France	Patrice Halgand	Jean Delatour
2001	France	Laurent Brochard	Jean Delatour
2002	France	Franck Bouyer	Bonjour
2003	Estonia	Jaan Kirsipuu	AG2R Prévoyance
2004	Norway	Thor Hushovd	Crédit Agricole
2005	Belgium	Philippe Gilbert	Française des Jeux
2006	France	Lloyd Mondory	AG2R Prévoyance
2007	France	Sébastien Chavanel	Française des Jeux
2008	France	Jérôme Pineau	Bouygues Télécom
2009	France	Jimmy Casper	Besson Chaussures–Sojasun
2010	Colombia	Leonardo Duque	Cofidis
2011	France	Tony Gallopin	Cofidis
2012	France	Samuel Dumoulin	Cofidis
2013	France	Samuel Dumoulin	Ag2r–La Mondiale
2014	France	Julien Simon	Cofidis
2015	France	Nacer Bouhanni	Cofidis
2016	France	Samuel Dumoulin	AG2R La Mondiale
2017	France	Laurent Pichon	Fortuneo–Vital Concept (Note: Team known as Fortuneo–Vital Concept until 30 June, when they became Fortuneo–Oscaro.); Fortuneo–Oscaro
2018	France	Hugo Hofstetter	Cofidis
2019	France	Marc Sarreau	Groupama–FDJ
2020	France	Nacer Bouhanni	Arkéa–Samsic
2021	France	Dorian Godon	AG2R Citroën Team
2022	France	Julien Simon	Team TotalEnergies
2023	France	Paul Penhoët	Groupama–FDJ
2024	France	Benoit Cosnefroy	Decathlon–AG2R La Mondiale
2025	France	Clément Venturini	Arkéa–B&B Hotels

=== Young riders ===
Year	Country	Rider	Team
2002	France	Sandy Casar	Française des Jeux
2003	France	Sylvain Chavanel	Brioches La Boulangère
2004	France	Jérôme Pineau	Brioches La Boulangère
2005	Belgium	Philippe Gilbert	Française des Jeux
2006	France	Lloyd Mondory	AG2R Prévoyance
2007	France	Romain Feillu	Agritubel
2008	France	Anthony Ravard	Agritubel
2009	France	Romain Feillu	Agritubel
2010	France	Florian Vachon	Bretagne–Schuller
2011	France	Tony Gallopin	Cofidis
2012	France	Arnaud Démare	FDJ–BigMat
2013	France	Bryan Coquard	Vendée U
2014	France	Armindo Fonseca	Bretagne–Séché Environnement
2015	France	Nacer Bouhanni	Cofidis
2016	France	Bryan Coquard	Direct Énergie
2017	France	David Gaudu	FDJ
2018	France	Hugo Hofstetter	Cofidis
2019	France	Benoît Cosnefroy	AG2R La Mondiale
2020	France	Benoît Cosnefroy	AG2R La Mondiale
2021	France	Dorian Godon	AG2R Citroën Team
2022	Italy	Luca Mozzato	Arkéa–Samsic
2023	France	Paul Penhoët	Groupama–FDJ
2024	France	Paul Lapeira	Decathlon–AG2R La Mondiale
2025	France	Brieuc Rolland	Groupama–FDJ

=== Teams ===
Season	Team
1992	Z
1993	GAN
1994	Castorama
1995	GAN
1996	GAN
1997	Française des Jeux
1998	Casino–Ag2r
1999	Française des Jeux
2000	Crédit Agricole
2001	Jean Delatour
2002	Bonjour
2003	Brioches La Boulangère
2004	Crédit Agricole
2005	Française des Jeux
2006	Bouygues Télécom
2007	Crédit Agricole
2008	Française des Jeux
2009	Française des Jeux
2010	Bretagne–Schuller
2011	FDJ
2012	Bretagne–Schuller
2013	FDJ.fr
2014	Bretagne–Séché Environnement
2015	Bretagne–Séché Environnement
2016	HP BTP–Auber93
2017	Fortuneo–Vital Concept; Fortuneo–Oscaro
2018	Cofidis
2019	AG2R La Mondiale
2020	AG2R La Mondiale
2021	AG2R Citroën Team
2022	Team TotalEnergies
2023	Cofidis
2024	Decathlon–AG2R La Mondiale
2025	Groupama–FDJ

== Statistics ==
- Most times overall winner: Samuel Dumoulin (3 wins)
- Most times team overall winner: Groupama–FDJ United (8 wins) followed by Crédit Agricole (Once as Z, three times as GAN) (7 wins)
- Most race wins: Jaan Kirsipuu (15 wins)
- Most race wins in one season: Samuel Dumoulin (4 wins in 2016)

== See also ==
- Belgian Road Cycling Cup
- Italian Road Cycling Cup
