= Daniele Balestri =

Italian cyclist (born 1978)

Personal information
- Full name: Daniele Balestri
- Born: 8 May 1978 (age 48) Pontedera, Italy

Cycling career
- Sport: Cycling
- Discipline: Road
- Role: Rider

Professional team
- 2004: ICET

Daniele Balestri (born 8 May 1978 in Pontedera) is an Italian former professional road racing cyclist. He won the Tour du Finistère in 2004.
