= Sébastien Chavanel =

French cyclist

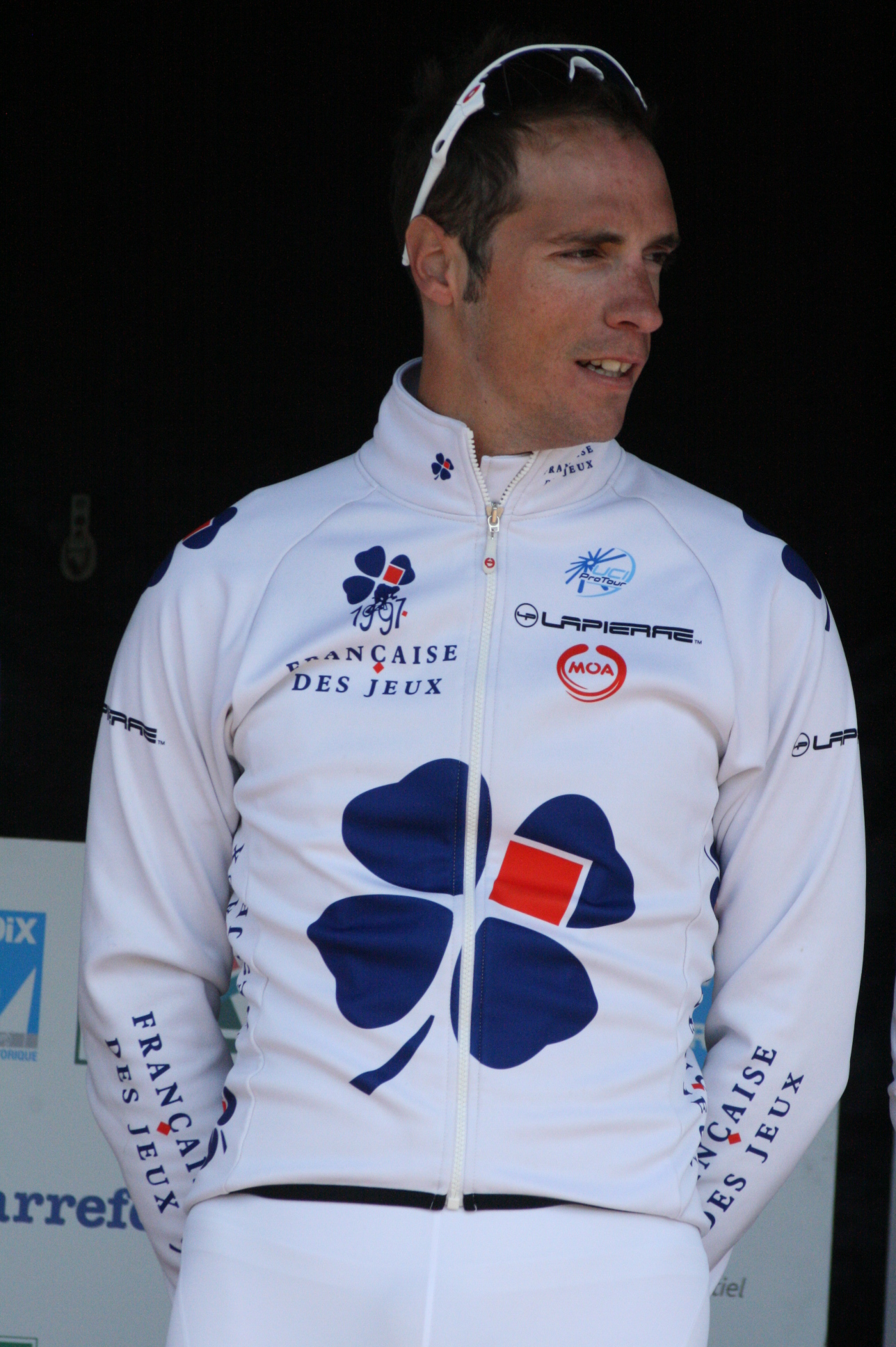
- Chavanel at the 2010 Four Days of Dunkirk

Personal information
- Full name: Sébastien Chavanel
- Born: 21 March 1981 (age 45) Châtellerault, France
- Height: 1.83 m (6 ft 0 in)
- Weight: 77 kg (170 lb)

Cycling career
- Sport: Cycling
- Current team: Retired
- Discipline: Road
- Role: Rider
- Rider type: Sprinter

Amateur teams
- 2001: VC Loudun
- 2002: Vendée U

Professional teams
- 2003–2006: Brioches La Boulangère
- 2007–2010: Française des Jeux
- 2011–2013: Team Europcar
- 2014–2016: FDJ.fr

Major wins
- GP de Denain (2007); Tour de Picardie (2008)

Sébastien Chavanel (born 21 March 1981) is a French former professional road bicycle racer who last rode for UCI ProTeam FDJ. He is a younger brother, by just under 2 years, to fellow professional cyclist Sylvain Chavanel.

After three seasons with Team Europcar, Chavanel returned to FDJ.fr for the 2014 season. At the 2015 Tour of Flanders, Chavanel sustained right thigh hematoma as a neutral service car rammed his team car which was stopped behind him to change his bike's wheel.

By finishing in last place in the 2015 Tour de France, he was that year's lanterne rouge rider.

== Major results ==
2002
1st La Côte Picarde
1st Stage 3 Ronde de l'Isard
5th Overall Tour du Loir-et-Cher

1st Stages 1 & 4

7th Road race, UCI Road World Under-23 Championships
2003
Tour de l'Avenir

1st Stages 2 & 3

2004
Tour de l'Avenir

1st Points classification
1st Stages 2, 4 & 5

1st Stage 5 Tour de Wallonie
4th Overall Tour de Picardie
2006
1st Stage 3 GP Internacional da Costa Azul
2007
1st Overall French Road Cycling Cup
1st Grand Prix de Denain
Étoile de Bessèges

1st Points classification
1st Stage 5

1st Stage 3 Tour de Picardie
1st Stage 3 Tour de Poitou-Charentes et de la Vienne
2nd Tro-Bro Léon
3rd Grand Prix d'Isbergues
4th Kuurne–Brussels–Kuurne
5th Châteauroux Classic de l Indre
2008
1st Overall Tour de Picardie

1st Points classification
1st Stage 4

2nd Grand Prix de la Ville de Rennes
2009
3rd Nokere Koerse
5th Paris–Bourges
2010
5th Paris–Bourges
6th Grand Prix de Denain
10th Paris–Tours
2011
1st Stage 2 Circuit de Lorraine
3rd La Roue Tourangelle
5th Overall Tour de Wallonie
6th Kuurne–Brussels–Kuurne
8th Le Samyn
9th Overall Driedaagse van West Vlaanderen
2012
2nd Neuseen Classics
7th Overall Tour de Picardie
7th Kuurne–Brussels–Kuurne
