= Julien Simon =

French road bicycle racer

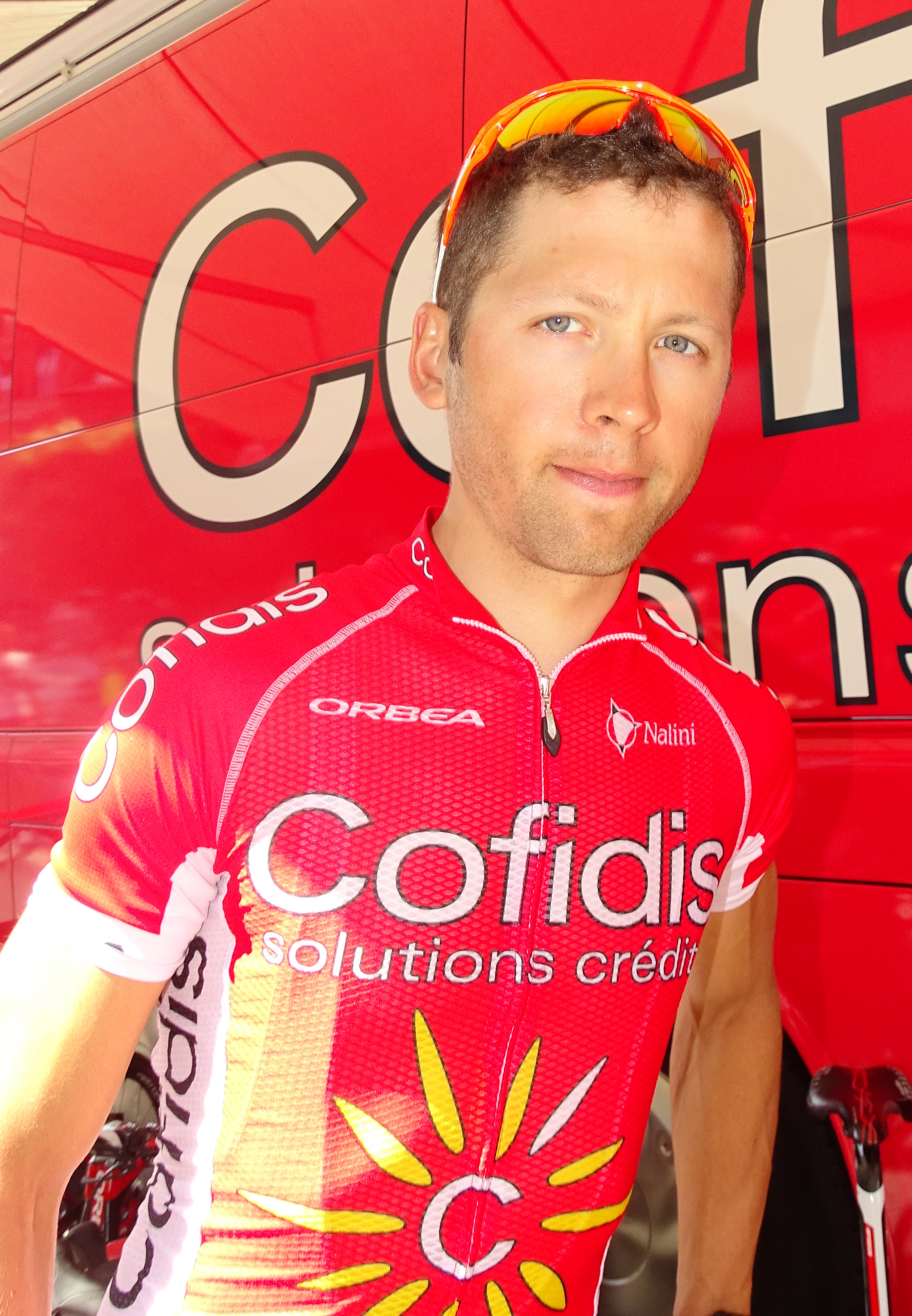
- Simon at the 2015 Tour de France

Personal information
- Nickname: Juju
- Born: 4 October 1985 (age 41) Rennes, France
- Height: 1.76 m (5 ft 9 1/2 in)
- Weight: 65 kg (143 lb; 10 st 3 lb)

Cycling career
- Sport: Cycling
- Current team: Retired
- Discipline: Road
- Role: Rider
- Rider type: Puncheur

Amateur team
- 2007: Super Sport 35

Professional teams
- 2008: Crédit Agricole
- 2009–2013: Besson Chaussures–Sojasun
- 2014–2019: Cofidis
- 2020–2024: Total Direct Énergie

Major wins
- One-day races and Classics GP du Morbihan (2012, 2014, 2022)

Julien Simon (born 4 October 1985) is a French former road bicycle racer, who competed as a professional from 2008 to 2024.

In his career, Simon competed for Crédit Agricole (2008), Sojasun (2009–2013), Cofidis (2014–2019), and Team TotalEnergies (2020–2024). He took thirteen professional victories, including a record three victories at both the Grand Prix du Morbihan and the Tour du Finistère, and two stage victories at the 2012 Volta a Catalunya.

== Major results ==
2007
8th Overall Tour du Haut-Anjou
2008
9th Tour du Doubs
2009
2nd Overall Tour du Gévaudan Languedoc-Roussillon
5th Overall Circuit de la Sarthe
7th Overall Tour du Haut Var
7th Paris–Camembert
10th Tour du Finistère
2010
3rd Overall Circuit de la Sarthe
4th Overall Tour de Wallonie
4th Grand Prix de Wallonie
5th Overall Boucles de la Mayenne
5th Les Boucles du Sud Ardèche
5th Route Adélie de Vitré
2011
1st Prueba Villafranca de Ordizia
2nd Grand Prix de Wallonie
3rd Overall Circuit de Lorraine
5th Grand Prix de Plumelec-Morbihan
5th Duo Normand (with Paul Poux)
5th Paris–Bourges
7th Polynormande
9th GP Ouest-France
2012
1st Tour du Finistère
1st Grand Prix de Plumelec-Morbihan
1st Grand Prix de Wallonie
Volta a Catalunya

1st Stages 5 & 7

3rd Overall Tour du Haut Var
3rd Route Adélie de Vitré
5th Boucles de l'Aulne
6th Tour du Doubs
2013
3rd Grand Prix de Plumelec-Morbihan
6th Route Adélie de Vitré
8th Les Boucles du Sud Ardèche
8th Tour de Vendée
9th Overall Tour du Haut Var
9th Grand Prix de Fourmies
9th Tour du Doubs
9th Grand Prix de Wallonie
10th Grand Prix d'Isbergues
2014
1st Overall French Road Cycling Cup
1st Grand Prix de Plumelec-Morbihan
2nd Route Adélie de Vitré
2nd Tour du Finistère
3rd Overall Circuit de la Sarthe
6th Grand Prix d'Ouverture La Marseillaise
6th Paris–Camembert
6th Grand Prix d'Isbergues
7th Overall Critérium International
7th Grand Prix de Wallonie
9th Tour de Vendée
10th Brussels Cycling Classic
10th Tour du Doubs
2015
2nd Grand Prix de Plumelec-Morbihan
3rd Tour du Finistère
2016
2nd Classic Sud-Ardèche
4th Overall Tour du Haut Var
4th La Drôme Classic
4th Tour du Finistère
2017
2nd Overall Tour du Haut Var

1st Stage 2

2nd Tour du Finistère
3rd Route Adélie de Vitré
3rd Grand Prix de Wallonie
4th Overall Circuit de la Sarthe
4th Overall Tour du Limousin
5th Grand Prix de Plumelec-Morbihan
7th Classic Sud-Ardèche
8th Gran Premio Bruno Beghelli
2018
1st Tour du Doubs
2nd Grand Prix de Plumelec-Morbihan
5th Clásica de San Sebastián
7th Coppa Sabatini
8th Tre Valli Varesine
2019
1st Tour du Finistère
2nd Road race, National Road Championships
8th Overall Tour de l'Ain
8th Tour du Doubs
8th Tour de Vendée
10th Overall Boucles de la Mayenne
10th Route Adélie de Vitré
2020
7th La Drôme Classic
2021
4th La Drôme Classic
6th Tour du Finistère
7th Tour du Doubs
9th Prueba Villafranca de Ordizia
10th Grand Prix of Aargau Canton
2022
1st Overall French Road Cycling Cup
1st Grand Prix du Morbihan
1st Tour du Finistère
1st Stage 1 Tour du Limousin
4th Overall Boucles de la Mayenne
4th Tour du Jura
5th Grand Prix d'Isbergues
7th Circuit Franco-Belge
7th Grand Prix de Fourmies
8th Overall Four Days of Dunkirk
8th Boucles de l'Aulne
8th Polynormande
9th Tour de Vendée
2023
6th Trofeo Matteotti
8th Grand Prix de Wallonie
2024
7th Overall Tour of Istanbul

=== Grand Tour results timeline ===
Grand Tour general classification results timeline
Grand Tour	2012	2013	2014	2015	2016	2017	2018	2019	2020	2021	2022	2023
Giro d'Italia	Has not contested during his career											
Tour de France	92	87	109	94	—	117	101	108	—	129	—	—
Vuelta a España	—	—	—	74	—	—	—	—	65	—	—	—
