= Tour du Doubs =

French one-day road cycling race

Race details
- Date: April
- Region: Doubs, France
- English name: Tour of Doubs
- Local name(s): Tour du Doubs (in French)
- Discipline: Road race
- Competition: UCI Europe Tour
- Type: Single-day

History
- First edition: 1934
- Editions: 40 (as of 2025)
- First winner: René Debenne (FRA)
- Most wins: Jérôme Coppel (FRA) (2 wins)
- Most recent: Mattéo Vercher (FRA)

The Tour du Doubs is a single-day road bicycle race, currently held annually in April in the region of Doubs, France. Since 2005, the race is organized as a 1.1 event on the UCI Europe Tour and since 2010 it is part of the French Road Cycling Cup.

== Winners ==
| Year | Country | Rider | Team |
|---|---|---|---|
| 1934 | France | René Debenne | individual |
| 1935 | France | Louis Thiétard | Peugeot–Hutchinson |
| 1936 | France | Manuel Garcia | Peugeot–Dunlop |
| 1937 | France | Guillaume Chavard | individual |
| 1938 | France | Aldo Bertocco | Mercier–Hutchinson |
| 1939 | France | Alphonse Antoine | Peugeot–Dunlop |
| 1940; 1947 | No race | | |
| 1948 | France | Jean de Gribaldy | Peugeot–Dunlop |
| 1949 | France | Adolphe Deledda | Rhonson–Dunlop |
| 1950 | Belgium | Robert Vanderstockt | Elvé–Météore |
| 1951 | Belgium | Pino Cerami | Peugeot–Dunlop |
| 1952 | France | Gilbert Bauvin | Nancia |
| 1953 | Poland | Alexandre Sowa | Peugeot–Dunlop |
| 1954 | France | Gaby Faillé | Terrot–Hutchinson |
| 1955; 1998 | No race | | |
| 1999 | France | Jérôme Gannat | CC Etupes |
| 2000 | Croatia | Vladimir Miholjević | KRKA-Telekom Slovenije |
| 2001 | France | Eddy Lembo | Jean Delatour |
| 2002 | France | Frédéric Finot | Jean Delatour |
| 2003 | Belgium | Bert De Waele | Landbouwkrediet–Colnago |
| 2004 | France | Matthieu Sprick | Brioches La Boulangère |
| 2005 | Ireland | Philip Deignan | AG2R Prévoyance |
| 2006 | France | Yoann Le Boulanger | Bouygues Télécom |
| 2007 | France | Vincent Jérôme | Bouygues Télécom |
| 2008 | France | Anthony Geslin | Bouygues Télécom |
| 2009 | France | Yann Huguet | Agritubel |
| 2010 | France | Jérôme Coppel | Saur–Sojasun |
| 2011 | France | Arthur Vichot | FDJ |
| 2012 | France | Jérôme Coppel | Saur–Sojasun |
| 2013 | Latvia | Aleksejs Saramotins | IAM Cycling |
| 2014 | Estonia | Rein Taaramäe | Cofidis |
| 2015 | Argentina | Eduardo Sepúlveda | Bretagne–Séché Environnement |
| 2016 | France | Samuel Dumoulin | AG2R La Mondiale |
| 2017 | France | Romain Hardy | Fortuneo–Oscaro |
| 2018 | France | Julien Simon | Cofidis |
| 2019 | Switzerland | Stefan Küng | Groupama–FDJ |
| 2020 | Belgium | Loïc Vliegen | Circus–Wanty Gobert |
| 2021 | France | Dorian Godon | AG2R Citroën Team |
| 2022 | France | Valentin Madouas | Groupama–FDJ |
| 2023 | Spain | Jesús Herrada | Cofidis |
| 2024 | France | Lenny Martinez | Groupama–FDJ |
| 2025 | France | Mattéo Vercher | Team TotalEnergies |
