= Châteauroux Classic =

French one-day road cycling race

Race details
- Date: Late August
- Region: Indre, France
- English name: Châteauroux Classic of Indre Fenioux Trophy
- Local name(s): Châteauroux Classic de l'Indre Trophée Fenioux (in French)
- Discipline: Road race
- Competition: UCI Europe Tour
- Type: Single-day
- Web site: www.classicdelindre.com

History
- First edition: 2004
- Editions: 11
- Final edition: 2014
- First winner: Aleksandr Kuschynski (BLR)
- Most wins: Anthony Ravard (FRA) (3 wins)
- Final winner: Iljo Keisse (BEL)

The Châteauroux Classic de l'Indre Trophée Fenioux was a single-day road bicycle race held annually in August in the region of Indre, France, starting and finishing in Châteauroux. It was created in 2004 and since 2005 the race had been organized as a 1.1 event on the UCI Europe Tour, also being part of the Coupe de France de cyclisme sur route. After the 2014 edition, the race was discontinued.

== Winners ==
Year	Country	Rider	Team
2004	Belarus	Aleksandr Kuschynski	Amore & Vita–Beretta
2005	France	Jimmy Casper	Cofidis
2006	France	Nicolas Vogondy	Crédit Agricole
2007	Australia	Christopher Sutton	Cofidis
2008	France	Anthony Ravard	Agritubel
2009	France	Jimmy Casper	Besson Chaussures–Sojasun
2010	France	Anthony Ravard	Ag2r–La Mondiale
2011	France	Anthony Ravard	Ag2r–La Mondiale
2012	Brazil	Rafael Andriato	Farnese Vini–Selle Italia
2013	France	Bryan Coquard	Team Europcar
2014	Belgium	Iljo Keisse	Omega Pharma–Quick-Step
