= Tour du Finistère =

French one-day road cycling race

Race details
- Date: April/May
- Region: Finistère, France
- English name: Tour of Finistère
- Local name: Tour du Finistère (in French)
- Discipline: Road race
- Competition: UCI Europe Tour
- Type: Single-day
- Web site: www.tourdufinistere.fr

History
- First edition: 1986
- Editions: 40 (as of 2026)
- First winner: Jean-Jacques Lamour (FRA)
- Most wins: Philippe Dalibard (FRA); Dominique Le Bon (FRA); Julien Simon (FRA) (2 wins)
- Most recent: Jon Barrenetxea (ESP)

Tour du Finistère is a single-day road bicycle race held annually in April around the city of Quimper, France. Since 2005, the race is organized as a 1.1 event on the UCI Europe Tour, also being part of the Coupe de France de cyclisme sur route.

== Winners ==
Year	Country	Rider	Team
1986	France	Jean-Jacques Lamour	C.D.C.L
1987	France	Philippe Dalibard	A.C. Brest Plougonvelin
1988	France	Pierre Le Bigault	C.C.O.P. Lorient
1989	France	Philippe Dalibard	E.C.F. Changé
1990	France	Philippe Mondory	C.C. Poitevin
1991	France	Dominique Le Bon	V.S. Scaërois
1992	France	Pierre-Henri Menthéour	V.S. Scaërois
1993	France	Dominique Le Bon	V.S. Scaërois
1994	France	Pascal Deramé	Vendée U
1995	France	Michel Lallouët	Bernard Sports
1996	France	Camille Coualan	Bernard Sports-O.C Locminé
1997	France	Walter Bénéteau	Vendée U
1998	France	Franck Trotel	V.C. Pontivyen
1999	France	Laurent Estadieu	U.S. Montauban
2000	France	Sébastien Hinault	Crédit Agricole
2001	France	Franck Rénier	Bonjour
2002	Spain	David Bernabeu	Carvalhelhos-Boavista
2003	France	Nicolas Fritsch	FDJeux.com
2004	Italy	Daniele Balestri	ICET
2005	Australia	Simon Gerrans	AG2R Prévoyance
2006	Russia	Sergey Kolesnikov	Omnibike Dynamo Moscow
2007	France	Niels Brouzes	Auber 93
2008	France	David Lelay	Bretagne–Armor Lux
2009	France	Dimitri Champion	Bretagne–Schuller
2010	France	Florian Vachon	Bretagne–Schuller
2011	France	Romain Feillu	Vacansoleil–DCM
2012	France	Julien Simon	Saur–Sojasun
2013	France	Cyril Gautier	Team Europcar
2014	Belgium	Antoine Demoitié	Wallonie-Bruxelles
2015	Belgium	Tim De Troyer	Wanty–Groupe Gobert
2016	Belgium	Baptiste Planckaert	Wallonie-Bruxelles–Group Protect
2017	France	Julien Loubet	Armée de Terre
2018	France	Jonathan Hivert	Direct Énergie
2019	France	Julien Simon	Cofidis
2020	No race due to the COVID-19 pandemic		
2021	France	Benoît Cosnefroy	AG2R Citroën Team
2022	France	Julien Simon	Team TotalEnergies
2023	France	Paul Penhoët	Groupama–FDJ
2024	France	Benoît Cosnefroy	Decathlon–AG2R La Mondiale
2025	France	Aubin Sparfel	Decathlon–AG2R La Mondiale
2026	Spain	Jon Barrenetxea	Movistar Team
