= 2020 Groupama–FDJ season =

Groupama-FDJ
- 2020 season
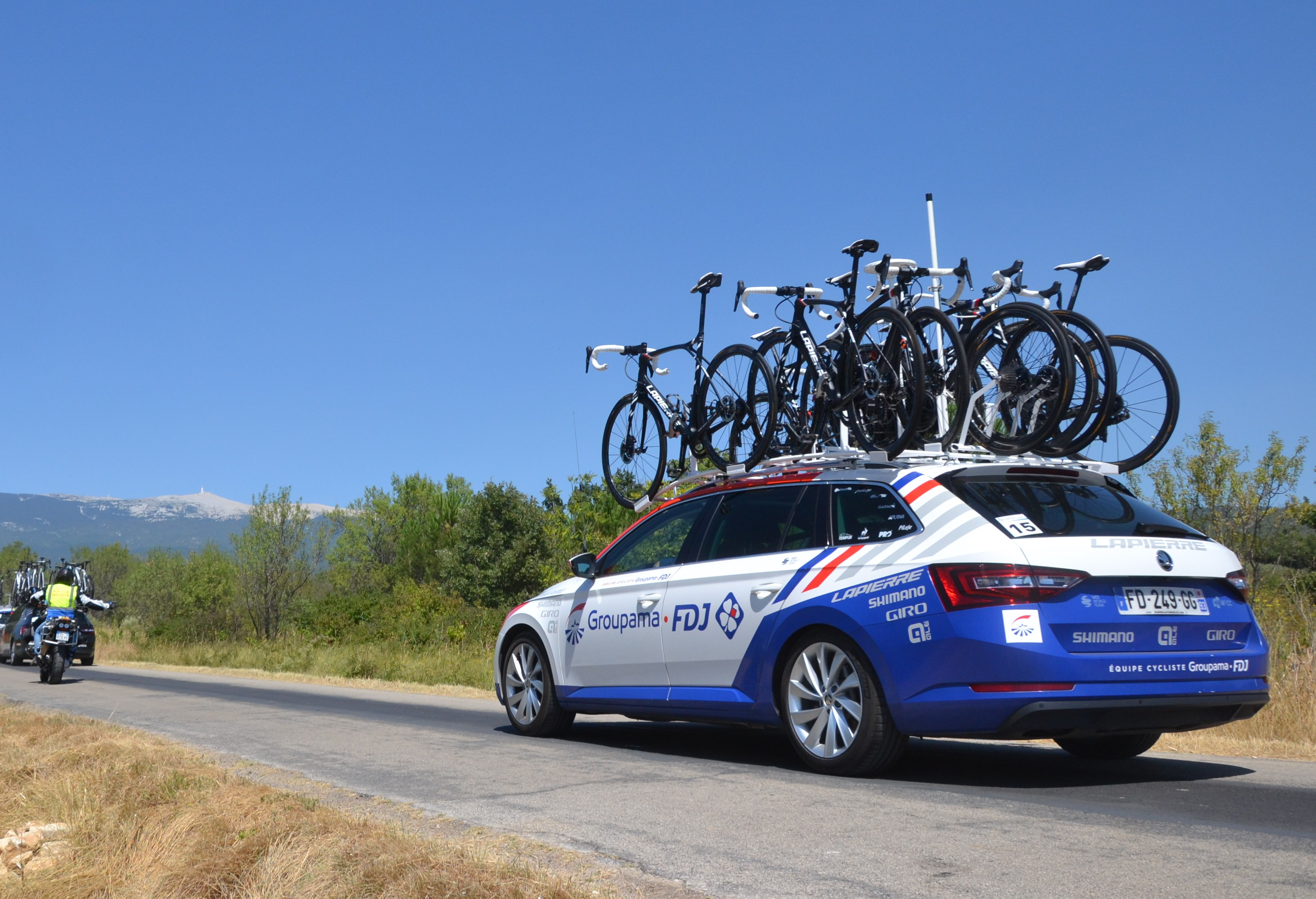
- UCI code: GFC
- Status: UCI WorldTeam
- Manager: Marc Madiot
- Main sponsor(s): Française des Jeux
- Based: France
- Bicycles: Lapierre
- Groupset: Shimano

Season victories
- One-day races: 1
- Stage race overall: 2
- Stage race stages: 13
- National Championships: 3
- Most wins: Arnaud Démare (17)
- Best ranked rider: Arnaud Démare
- Jersey

The 2020 cycling season for Groupama–FDJ began in January at the Tour Down Under in Australia.

== Team roster ==
As of 1 October 2020.

Rider	Date of birth
Bruno Armirail (FRA)	11 April 1994 (aged 25)
William Bonnet (FRA)	25 June 1982 (aged 37)
Alexys Brunel (FRA)	10 October 1998 (aged 21)
Mickaël Delage (FRA)	6 August 1985 (aged 34)
Arnaud Démare (FRA)	26 August 1991 (aged 28)
Antoine Duchesne (CAN)	12 September 1991 (aged 28)
Kilian Frankiny (SUI)	26 January 1994 (aged 25)
David Gaudu (FRA)	10 October 1996 (aged 23)
Kévin Geniets (LUX)	9 January 1997 (aged 22)
Jacopo Guarnieri (ITA)	14 August 1987 (aged 32)
Simon Guglielmi (FRA)	1 July 1997 (aged 22)
Ignatas Konovalovas (LIT)	8 December 1985 (aged 34)
Stefan Küng (SUI)	16 November 1993 (aged 26)
Mathieu Ladagnous (FRA)	12 December 1984 (aged 35)
Olivier Le Gac (FRA)	27 August 1993 (aged 26)

Rider	Date of birth
Fabian Lienhard (SUI)	3 September 1993 (aged 26)
Tobias Ludvigsson (SWE)	22 February 1991 (aged 28)
Valentin Madouas (FRA)	12 July 1996 (aged 23)
Rudy Molard (FRA)	17 September 1989 (aged 30)
Thibaut Pinot (FRA)	29 May 1990 (aged 29)
Sébastien Reichenbach (SUI)	28 May 1989 (aged 30)
Anthony Roux (FRA)	18 April 1987 (aged 32)
Marc Sarreau (FRA)	10 June 1993 (aged 26)
Miles Scotson (AUS)	18 January 1994 (aged 25)
Romain Seigle (FRA)	11 October 1994 (aged 25)
Ramon Sinkeldam (NED)	9 February 1989 (aged 30)
Jake Stewart (Note: Stewart was promoted from the development team on 1 October.) (GBR)	2 October 1999 (aged 20)
Benjamin Thomas (FRA)	12 September 1995 (aged 24)
Léo Vincent (FRA)	6 November 1995 (aged 24)

Riders who joined the team for the 2020 season

Rider	2019 team
Alexys Brunel	neo-pro (Équipe Continentale Groupama–FDJ)
Simon Guglielmi	neo-pro (Équipe Continentale Groupama–FDJ)
Fabian Lienhard	neo-pro (IAM–Excelsior)
Jake Stewart	neo-pro (Équipe Continentale Groupama–FDJ)

Riders who left the team during or after the 2019 season

Rider	2020 team
Daniel Hoelgaard	Uno-X Norwegian Development Team
Steve Morabito	Retired
Georg Preidler	Suspended
Benoît Vaugrenard	Retired

== Season victories ==
Date	Race	Competition	Rider	Country	Location
5 February	Étoile de Bessèges, Stage 1	UCI Europe Tour	Alexys Brunel (FRA)	France	Bellegarde
9 February	Étoile de Bessèges, Young rider classification	UCI Europe Tour	Alexys Brunel (FRA)	France	
5 August	Milano–Torino	UCI Europe Tour; UCI ProSeries	Arnaud Démare (FRA)	Italy	Turin
17 August	Tour de Wallonie, Stage 2	UCI Europe Tour; UCI ProSeries	Arnaud Démare (FRA)	Belgium	Wavre
19 August	Tour de Wallonie, Stage 4	UCI Europe Tour; UCI ProSeries	Arnaud Démare (FRA)	Belgium	Érezée
19 August	Tour de Wallonie, Overall	UCI Europe Tour; UCI ProSeries	Arnaud Démare (FRA)	Belgium	
19 August	Tour de Wallonie, Points classification	UCI Europe Tour; UCI ProSeries	Arnaud Démare (FRA)	Belgium	
27 August	Tour Poitou-Charentes en Nouvelle-Aquitaine, Stage 1	UCI Europe Tour	Arnaud Démare (FRA)	France	Royan
28 August	Tour Poitou-Charentes en Nouvelle-Aquitaine, Stage 2	UCI Europe Tour	Arnaud Démare (FRA)	France	Échiré
30 August	Tour Poitou-Charentes en Nouvelle-Aquitaine, Stage 4	UCI Europe Tour	Arnaud Démare (FRA)	France	Poitiers
30 August	Tour Poitou-Charentes en Nouvelle-Aquitaine, Overall	UCI Europe Tour	Arnaud Démare (FRA)	France	
30 August	Tour Poitou-Charentes en Nouvelle-Aquitaine, Points classification	UCI Europe Tour	Arnaud Démare (FRA)	France	
16 September	Tour de Luxembourg, Stage 2	UCI Europe Tour; UCI ProSeries	Arnaud Démare (FRA)	Luxembourg	Hesperange
6 October	Giro d'Italia, Stage 4	UCI World Tour	Arnaud Démare (FRA)	Italy	Villafranca Tirrena
8 October	Giro d'Italia, Stage 6	UCI World Tour	Arnaud Démare (FRA)	Italy	Matera
9 October	Giro d'Italia, Stage 7	UCI World Tour	Arnaud Démare (FRA)	Italy	Brindisi
14 October	Giro d'Italia, Stage 11	UCI World Tour	Arnaud Démare (FRA)	Italy	Rimini
25 October	Giro d'Italia, Points classification	UCI World Tour	Arnaud Démare (FRA)	Italy	
31 October	Vuelta a España, Stage 11	UCI World Tour	David Gaudu (FRA)	Spain	Alto de la Farrapona
7 November	Vuelta a España, Stage 17	UCI World Tour	David Gaudu (FRA)	Spain	Alto de la Covatilla

== National, Continental and World champions ==
Date	Discipline	Jersey	Rider	Country	Location
12 July	Swiss National Time Trial Championships		Stefan Küng (SUI)	Switzerland	Belp
23 August	French National Road Race Championships		Arnaud Démare (FRA)	France	Grand-Champ
23 August	Luxembourg National Road Race Championships		Kevin Geniets (LUX)	Luxembourg	Mamer
24 August	European Time Trial Champion		Stefan Küng (SUI)	France	Plouay
