= List of protected heritage sites in Érezée =

This table shows an overview of the protected heritage sites in the Walloon town Érezée. This list is part of Belgium's national heritage.

Object	Year/architect	Town/section	Address	Coordinates	Number^{?}	Image
St. Remigius Chapel ("Saint-Remy") ^{(nl)} ^{(fr)}		Érezée	Fisenne	50.291210°N 5.531753°E	83013-CLT-0001-01 Info	Sint-Remigiuskapel ('Saint-Remy')
Walls and roofs of the main building, the west entrance and the corner tower of the courtyard of the castle ^{(nl)} ^{(fr)}		Érezée		50.285132°N 5.510324°E	83013-CLT-0002-01 Info	
Castle farm of Soy: classification extended to the following parties ^{(nl)} ^{(fr)}		Érezée		50.284795°N 5.509898°E	83013-CLT-0003-01 Info	
Walls and roofs of large and small towers and turrets of the castle Fisenne. ^{(nl)} ^{(fr)}		Érezée		50.290223°N 5.532301°E	83013-CLT-0005-01 Info	
Facades and roofs of all buildings of the castle Fisenne. This includes the farm, the southeastern wing and the remains of the park and around the castle. Establishment of a protection zone ^{(nl)} ^{(fr)}		Érezée		50.290210°N 5.532155°E	83013-CLT-0006-01 Info	Gevels en daken van alle gebouwen van de kasteelhoeve Fisenne. Dit omvatte de huisvesting van boerderij, gelegen in het zuidoostelijke vleugel en de overblijfselen van het park en rond het kasteel. Oprichting van een beschermingszone.
Castle farm of Ny ^{(nl)} ^{(fr)}		Érezée		50.284076°N 5.478277°E	83013-CLT-0007-01 Info	
La Houssière, including the path which borders it in the south ^{(nl)} ^{(fr)}		Érezée		50.279069°N 5.559355°E	83013-CLT-0008-01 Info	

== See also ==
- List of protected heritage sites in Luxembourg (Belgium)
- Érezée
