= Mormont (disambiguation) =

Le Mormont is a hill in Vaud, Switzerland.

Mormont may also refer to:

== Places ==
- Mormont, Nassogne, Luxembourg, Wallonia, Belgium; a hamlet
- Mormont, Érezée, Luxembourg, Wallonia, Belgium; a district of Érezée

== A Song of Ice and Fire / Game of Thrones characters ==
  - Jeor Mormont, Lord Commander of the Night's Watch, formerly the Lord of Bear Island
  - Jorah Mormont, son of Jeor and a mercenary knight in exile
  - Lyanna Mormont, niece of Jeor and head of House Mormont of Bear Island
