= 2020 Tour de Wallonie =

2020 UCI Europe Tour 2020 UCI ProSeries

Race details
- Dates: 16 – 19 August 2020
- Stages: 4
- Distance: 750.7 km (466.5 mi)
- Winning time: 17h 48' 51"

Results
Jersey awarded to the overall winner	Winner	Arnaud Démare (FRA)	(Groupama–FDJ)
	Second	Greg Van Avermaet (BEL)	(CCC Team)
	Third	Amaury Capiot (BEL)	(Sport Vlaanderen–Baloise)
Jersey awarded to the points classification winner	Points	Arnaud Démare (FRA)	(Groupama–FDJ)
Jersey awarded to the mountains classification winner	Mountains	Michał Gołaś (POL)	(Team Ineos)
Jersey awarded to the youth classification winner	Youth	Jhonatan Narváez (ECU)	(Team Ineos)
Jersey awarded to the sprints classification winner	Sprints	Dries De Bondt (BEL)	(Alpecin–Fenix)
	Team	AG2R La Mondiale	

The 2020 Tour de Wallonie (known as the VOO–Tour de Wallonie for sponsorship reasons) was a four-stage men's professional road cycling race mainly held in the Belgian region of Wallonia. It was a 2.Pro race as part of the 2020 UCI Europe Tour and the inaugural 2020 UCI ProSeries. It was the forty-seventh edition of the Tour de Wallonie, starting on 16 August in Soignies and finishing on 19 August in Érezée. It was originally scheduled for 27 – 31 July, but due to the COVID-19 pandemic, it was postponed to mid-August after the UCI's May calendar update and was shortened from five stages like in years prior to four stages.

== Schedule ==
Stage characteristics and winners
Stage	Date	Route	Distance	Type	Winner
1	16 August	Soignies to Templeuve	187 km (116 mi)	Hilly stage	Caleb Ewan (AUS)
2	17 August	Frasnes-lez-Anvaing to Wavre	172.3 km (107.1 mi)	Hilly stage	Arnaud Démare (FRA)
3	18 August	Plombières to Visé	192 km (119 mi)	Hilly stage	Sam Bennett (IRL)
4	19 August	Blegny to Érezée	199.4 km (123.9 mi)	Hilly stage	Arnaud Démare (FRA)
Total		750.7 km (466.5 mi)			

== Teams ==
Twenty-three teams, consisting of nine UCI WorldTeams, nine UCI ProTeams, and five UCI Continental teams participated in the race. Each team entered seven riders, with the exception of Israel Start-Up Nation, which only entered six. 123 of the 153 riders that started the race finished.

UCI WorldTeams

- AG2R La Mondiale
- Bahrain–McLaren
- CCC Team
- Deceuninck–Quick-Step
- Groupama–FDJ
- Israel Start-Up Nation
- Lotto–Soudal
- NTT Pro Cycling
- Team Ineos

UCI ProTeams

- Alpecin–Fenix
- Arkéa–Samsic
- B&B Hotels–Vital Concept
- Bingoal–Wallonie Bruxelles
- Burgos BH
- Circus–Wanty Gobert
- Riwal Readynez
- Sport Vlaanderen–Baloise
- Total Direct Énergie

UCI Continental Teams

- Hagens Berman Axeon
- Pauwels Sauzen–Bingoal
- Tarteletto–Isorex
- Telenet–Baloise Lions
- Wallonie–Bruxelles Development Team

== Stages ==
=== Stage 1 ===
16 August 2020 — Soignies to Templeuve, 187 km (116 mi)

Stage 1 Result
Rank	Rider	Team	Time
1	Caleb Ewan (AUS)	Lotto–Soudal	4h 17' 20"
2	Sam Bennett (IRL)	Deceuninck–Quick-Step	+ 0"
3	Tim Merlier (BEL)	Alpecin–Fenix	+ 0"
4	Arvid de Kleijn (NED)	Riwal Readynez	+ 0"
5	Nacer Bouhanni (FRA)	Arkéa–Samsic	+ 0"
6	Itamar Einhorn (ISR)	Israel Start-Up Nation	+ 0"
7	Arnaud Démare (FRA)	Groupama–FDJ	+ 0"
8	Manuel Peñalver (ESP)	Burgos BH	+ 0"
9	Silvan Dillier (SUI)	AG2R La Mondiale	+ 0"
10	Clément Venturini (FRA)	AG2R La Mondiale	+ 0"

General classification after Stage 1
Rank	Rider	Team	Time
1	Caleb Ewan (AUS)	Lotto–Soudal	4h 17' 10"
2	Dries De Bondt (BEL)	Alpecin–Fenix	+ 2"
3	Jens Reynders (BEL)	Hagens Berman Axeon	+ 3"
4	Sam Bennett (IRL)	Deceuninck–Quick-Step	+ 4"
5	Tim Merlier (BEL)	Alpecin–Fenix	+ 6"
6	Arvid de Kleijn (NED)	Riwal Readynez	+ 10"
7	Nacer Bouhanni (FRA)	Arkéa–Samsic	+ 10"
8	Itamar Einhorn (ISR)	Israel Start-Up Nation	+ 10"
9	Arnaud Démare (FRA)	Groupama–FDJ	+ 10"
10	Manuel Peñalver (ESP)	Burgos BH	+ 10"

=== Stage 2 ===
17 August 2020 — Frasnes-lez-Anvaing to Wavre, 172.3 km (107.1 mi)

Stage 2 Result
Rank	Rider	Team	Time
1	Arnaud Démare (FRA)	Groupama–FDJ	3h 57' 43"
2	Caleb Ewan (AUS)	Lotto–Soudal	+ 0"
3	Daniel McLay (GBR)	Arkéa–Samsic	+ 0"
4	Nacer Bouhanni (FRA)	Arkéa–Samsic	+ 0"
5	Florian Sénéchal (FRA)	Deceuninck–Quick-Step	+ 0"
6	Arvid de Kleijn (NED)	Riwal Readynez	+ 0"
7	Giacomo Nizzolo (ITA)	NTT Pro Cycling	+ 0"
8	Dries Van Gestel (BEL)	Total Direct Énergie	+ 0"
9	Lionel Taminiaux (BEL)	Bingoal–Wallonie Bruxelles	+ 0"
10	Edward Planckaert (BEL)	Sport Vlaanderen–Baloise	+ 0"

General classification after Stage 2
Rank	Rider	Team	Time
1	Caleb Ewan (AUS)	Lotto–Soudal	8h 15' 43"
2	Dries De Bondt (BEL)	Alpecin–Fenix	+ 2"
3	Arnaud Démare (FRA)	Groupama–FDJ	+ 6"
4	Jens Reynders (BEL)	Hagens Berman Axeon	+ 9"
5	Daniel McLay (GBR)	Arkéa–Samsic	+ 12"
6	Tom Wirtgen (LUX)	Bingoal–Wallonie Bruxelles	+ 14"
7	Amaury Capiot (BEL)	Sport Vlaanderen–Baloise	+ 15"
8	James Fouché (NZL)	Hagens Berman Axeon	+ 15"
9	Nacer Bouhanni (FRA)	Arkéa–Samsic	+ 16"
10	Arvid de Kleijn (NED)	Riwal Readynez	+ 16"

=== Stage 3 ===
18 August 2020 — Plombières to Visé, 192 km (119 mi)

Stage 3 Result
Rank	Rider	Team	Time
1	Sam Bennett (IRL)	Deceuninck–Quick-Step	4h 42' 25"
2	Arnaud Démare (FRA)	Groupama–FDJ	+ 0"
3	John Degenkolb (GER)	Lotto–Soudal	+ 0"
4	Matteo Trentin (ITA)	CCC Team	+ 1"
5	Amaury Capiot (BEL)	Sport Vlaanderen–Baloise	+ 1"
6	Andrea Vendrame (ITA)	AG2R La Mondiale	+ 1"
7	Marco Haller (AUT)	Bahrain–McLaren	+ 1"
8	Alexander Krieger (GER)	Alpecin–Fenix	+ 1"
9	Baptiste Planckaert (BEL)	Bingoal–Wallonie Bruxelles	+ 1"
10	Clément Venturini (FRA)	AG2R La Mondiale	+ 1"

General classification after Stage 3
Rank	Rider	Team	Time
1	Arnaud Démare (FRA)	Groupama–FDJ	12h 57' 28"
2	Amaury Capiot (BEL)	Sport Vlaanderen–Baloise	+ 16"
3	James Fouché (NZL)	Hagens Berman Axeon	+ 16"
4	Clément Venturini (FRA)	AG2R La Mondiale	+ 17"
5	Oliver Naesen (BEL)	AG2R La Mondiale	+ 17"
6	Greg Van Avermaet (BEL)	CCC Team	+ 17"
7	Jenthe Biermans (BEL)	Israel Start-Up Nation	+ 17"
8	Lawrence Naesen (BEL)	AG2R La Mondiale	+ 17"
9	Loïc Vliegen (BEL)	Circus–Wanty Gobert	+ 17"
10	Nick van der Lijke (NED)	Riwal Readynez	+ 17"

=== Stage 4 ===
19 August 2020 — Blegny to Érezée, 199.4 km (123.9 mi)

Stage 4 Result
Rank	Rider	Team	Time
1	Arnaud Démare (FRA)	Groupama–FDJ	4h 51' 28"
2	Philippe Gilbert (BEL)	Lotto–Soudal	+ 0"
3	Greg Van Avermaet (BEL)	CCC Team	+ 0"
4	Clément Venturini (FRA)	AG2R La Mondiale	+ 0"
5	Jasper De Buyst (BEL)	Lotto–Soudal	+ 0"
6	Amaury Capiot (BEL)	Sport Vlaanderen–Baloise	+ 0"
7	Florian Sénéchal (FRA)	Deceuninck–Quick-Step	+ 0"
8	Andrea Vendrame (ITA)	AG2R La Mondiale	+ 0"
9	Romain Hardy (FRA)	Arkéa–Samsic	+ 4"
10	Bryan Coquard (FRA)	B&B Hotels–Vital Concept	+ 4"

General classification after Stage 4
Rank	Rider	Team	Time
1	Arnaud Démare (FRA)	Groupama–FDJ	17h 48' 51"
2	Greg Van Avermaet (BEL)	CCC Team	+ 20"
3	Amaury Capiot (BEL)	Sport Vlaanderen–Baloise	+ 25"
4	Florian Sénéchal (FRA)	Deceuninck–Quick-Step	+ 26"
5	Clément Venturini (FRA)	AG2R La Mondiale	+ 27"
6	Andrea Vendrame (ITA)	AG2R La Mondiale	+ 27"
7	Jasper De Buyst (BEL)	Lotto–Soudal	+ 27"
8	Jhonatan Narváez (ECU)	Team Ineos	+ 30"
9	Romain Hardy (FRA)	Arkéa–Samsic	+ 31"
10	Oliver Naesen (BEL)	AG2R La Mondiale	+ 32"

== Classification leadership table ==
Classification leadership by stage
Stage	Winner	General classification	Points classification	Mountains classification	Young rider classification	Sprints classification	Teams classification	Combativity award
1	Caleb Ewan	Caleb Ewan	Caleb Ewan	Tom Paquot	Jens Reynders	Dries De Bondt	AG2R La Mondiale	Edward Planckaert
2	Arnaud Démare	Caleb Ewan	Caleb Ewan	Tom Paquot	Jens Reynders	Dries De Bondt	AG2R La Mondiale	Gianni Marchand
3	Sam Bennett	Arnaud Démare	Arnaud Démare	Michał Gołaś	James Fouché	Dries De Bondt	Deceuninck–Quick-Step	Carlos Canal
4	Arnaud Démare	Arnaud Démare	Arnaud Démare	Michał Gołaś	Jhonatan Narváez	Dries De Bondt	AG2R La Mondiale	Tom Paquot
Final		Arnaud Démare	Arnaud Démare	Michał Gołaś	Jhonatan Narváez	Dries De Bondt	AG2R La Mondiale	Not awarded

- On stage two, Arvid de Kleijn, who was fourth in the points classification, wore the green jersey, because first placed Caleb Ewan wore the yellow jersey as leader of the general classification, second placed Sam Bennett wore the Irish national champions' jersey as the defending Irish national road race champion, and third placed Tim Merlier wore the Belgian national champions' jersey as the defending Belgian national road race champion.
- On stage three, Arnaud Démare, who was second in the points classification, wore the green jersey, because first placed Caleb Ewan wore the yellow jersey as leader of the general classification.
- On stage four, Caleb Ewan, who was second in the points classification, wore the green jersey, because first placed Arnaud Démare wore the yellow jersey as leader of the general classification.

== Final classification standings ==
Legend
Denotes the winner of the general classification	Denotes the winner of the young rider classification
Denotes the winner of the points classification	Denotes the winner of the sprints classification
Denotes the winner of the mountains classification	

=== General classification ===
Final general classification (1–10)
Rank	Rider	Team	Time
1	Arnaud Démare (FRA)	Groupama–FDJ	17h 48' 51"
2	Greg Van Avermaet (BEL)	CCC Team	+ 20"
3	Amaury Capiot (BEL)	Sport Vlaanderen–Baloise	+ 25"
4	Florian Sénéchal (FRA)	Deceuninck–Quick-Step	+ 26"
5	Clément Venturini (FRA)	AG2R La Mondiale	+ 27"
6	Andrea Vendrame (ITA)	AG2R La Mondiale	+ 27"
7	Jasper De Buyst (BEL)	Lotto–Soudal	+ 27"
8	Jhonatan Narváez (ECU)	Team Ineos	+ 30"
9	Romain Hardy (FRA)	Arkéa–Samsic	+ 31"
10	Oliver Naesen (BEL)	AG2R La Mondiale	+ 32"

=== Points classification ===
Final points classification (1–10)
Rank	Rider	Team	Points
1	Arnaud Démare (FRA)	Groupama–FDJ	74
2	Caleb Ewan (AUS)	Lotto–Soudal	45
3	Sam Bennett (IRL)	Deceuninck–Quick-Step	45
4	Greg Van Avermaet (BEL)	CCC Team	15
5	John Degenkolb (GER)	Lotto–Soudal	15
6	Daniel McLay (GBR)	Arkéa–Samsic	15
7	Tim Merlier (BEL)	Alpecin–Fenix	15
8	Amaury Capiot (BEL)	Sport Vlaanderen–Baloise	14
9	Florian Sénéchal (FRA)	Deceuninck–Quick-Step	12
10	Clément Venturini (FRA)	AG2R La Mondiale	12

=== Mountains classification ===
Final mountains classification (1–10)
Rank	Rider	Team	Points
1	Michał Gołaś (POL)	Team Ineos	38
2	Tom Paquot (BEL)	Wallonie–Bruxelles Development Team	36
3	Carlos Canal (ESP)	Burgos BH	26
4	Scott Thwaites (GBR)	Alpecin–Fenix	26
5	Zdeněk Štybar (CZE)	Deceuninck–Quick-Step	24
6	Jhonatan Narváez (ECU)	Team Ineos	18
7	Greg Van Avermaet (BEL)	CCC Team	16
8	Loïc Vliegen (BEL)	Circus–Wanty Gobert	14
9	Stan Dewulf (BEL)	Lotto–Soudal	14
10	Andreas Kron (DEN)	Riwal Readynez	12

=== Sprints classification ===
Final sprints classification (1–10)
Rank	Rider	Team	Points
1	Dries De Bondt (BEL)	Alpecin–Fenix	23
2	Jens Reynders (BEL)	Hagens Berman Axeon	11
3	Zdeněk Štybar (CZE)	Deceuninck–Quick-Step	10
4	Andreas Goeman (BEL)	Telenet–Baloise Lions	10
5	Greg Van Avermaet (BEL)	CCC Team	5
6	Milan Menten (BEL)	Sport Vlaanderen–Baloise	5
7	Jannik Steimle (GER)	Deceuninck–Quick-Step	5
8	Michał Gołaś (POL)	Team Ineos	5
9	Jhonatan Narváez (ECU)	Team Ineos	3
10	Philippe Gilbert (BEL)	Lotto–Soudal	3

=== Young rider classification ===
Final young rider classification (1–10)
Rank	Rider	Team	Time
1	Jhonatan Narváez (ECU)	Team Ineos	17h 49' 21"
2	Kevin Vermaerke (USA)	Hagens Berman Axeon	+ 2"
3	Kevin Inkelaar (NED)	Bahrain–McLaren	+ 2"
4	Kevin Geniets (LUX)	Groupama–FDJ	+ 1' 01"
5	James Fouché (NZL)	Hagens Berman Axeon	+ 1' 20"
6	Aaron Van Poucke (BEL)	Sport Vlaanderen–Baloise	+ 1' 21"
7	Lars van den Berg (NED)	Groupama–FDJ	+ 1' 41"
8	Jarrad Drizners (AUS)	Hagens Berman Axeon	+ 3' 25"
9	Andreas Kron (DEN)	Riwal Readynez	+ 3' 43"
10	Alex Molenaar (NED)	Burgos BH	+ 4' 49"

=== Teams classification ===
Final teams classification (1–10)
Rank	Team	Time
1	AG2R La Mondiale	53h 27' 59"
2	Bingoal–Wallonie Bruxelles	+ 10"
3	Groupama–FDJ	+ 1' 49"
4	Sport Vlaanderen–Baloise	+ 1' 50"
5	Lotto–Soudal	+ 2' 18"
6	Bahrain–McLaren	+ 3' 33"
7	CCC Team	+ 3' 56"
8	Deceuninck–Quick-Step	+ 4' 42"
9	Hagens Berman Axeon	+ 4' 52"
10	Riwal Readynez	+ 6' 12"
