= Damien Touzé =

French cyclist (born 1996)

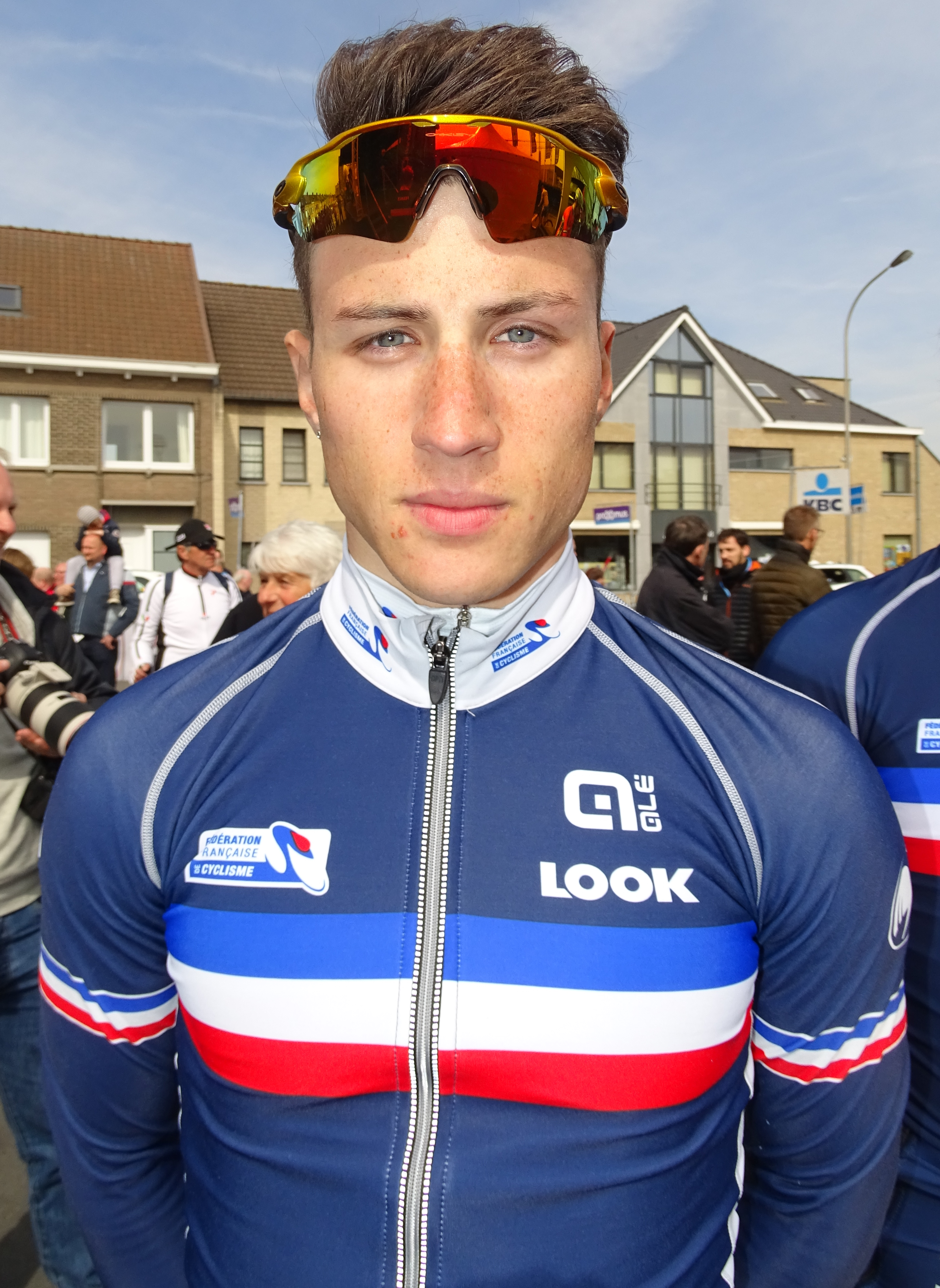
- Touzé in 2016

Personal information
- Full name: Damien Touzé
- Born: 7 July 1996 (age 30) Iville, France
- Height: 1.74 m (5 ft 9 in)
- Weight: 69 kg (152 lb)

Cycling career
- Sport: Cycling
- Current team: Cofidis
- Discipline: Road
- Role: Rider

Amateur teams
- 2012–2015: UV Neubourg
- 2015–2016: CC Étupes
- 2016: HP BTP–Auber93 (stagiaire)

Professional teams
- 2017–2018: HP BTP–Auber93
- 2019–2020: Cofidis
- 2021–2024: AG2R Citroën Team
- 2025–: Cofidis

Damien Touzé (born 7 July 1996) is a French cyclist, who currently rides for UCI WorldTeam Cofidis. Touzé stepped up to the UCI WorldTour with Cofidis in 2019 after two years with UCI Continental team HP BTP–Auber93, and was named in the startlist for the 2019 Vuelta a España.

== Major results ==
2013
4th Road race, UEC European Junior Road Championships
4th Paris–Roubaix Juniors
2014
5th Paris–Roubaix Juniors
9th Overall Tour de l'Abitibi

1st Stage 4

10th Road race, UEC European Junior Road Championships
2017
3rd Road race, National Under-23 Road Championships
6th Road race, UCI Under-23 Road World Championships
7th Paris–Troyes
8th Grand Prix de Denain
8th Paris–Camembert
8th Tro-Bro Léon
8th La Roue Tourangelle
9th Grand Prix de la Somme
2018
1st Overall Kreiz Breizh Elites

1st Points classification
1st Young rider classification
1st Stage 1

Tour de l'Avenir

1st Points classification
1st Stage 3

3rd Paris–Troyes
4th Classic Loire Atlantique
5th Paris–Camembert
6th Overall Ronde de l'Oise

1st Stage 2

8th Ronde van Vlaanderen Beloften
10th Paris–Bourges
2019
3rd Road race, National Road Championships
3rd Polynormande
8th Binche–Chimay–Binche
2020
7th Overall Étoile de Bessèges
7th Grand Prix La Marseillaise
2021
3rd Road race, National Road Championships
10th Tour du Finistère
2022
9th Paris–Camembert
10th Overall Four Days of Dunkirk
2023
10th Classic Loire Atlantique
2024
4th Overall Tour de la Provence
8th Overall Tour of Belgium
2025
7th Overall Étoile de Bessèges

=== Grand Tour general classification results timeline ===
| Grand Tour | 2019 | 2020 | 2021 | 2022 | 2023 | 2024 |
|---|---|---|---|---|---|---|
| Giro d'Italia | — | — | — | — | — | 69 |
| Tour de France | — | — | — | — | — | |
| Vuelta a España | 108 | — | 79 | — | DNF | |

Legend
| — | Did not compete |
| DNF | Did not finish |
