= Benjamin Giraud =

French cyclist

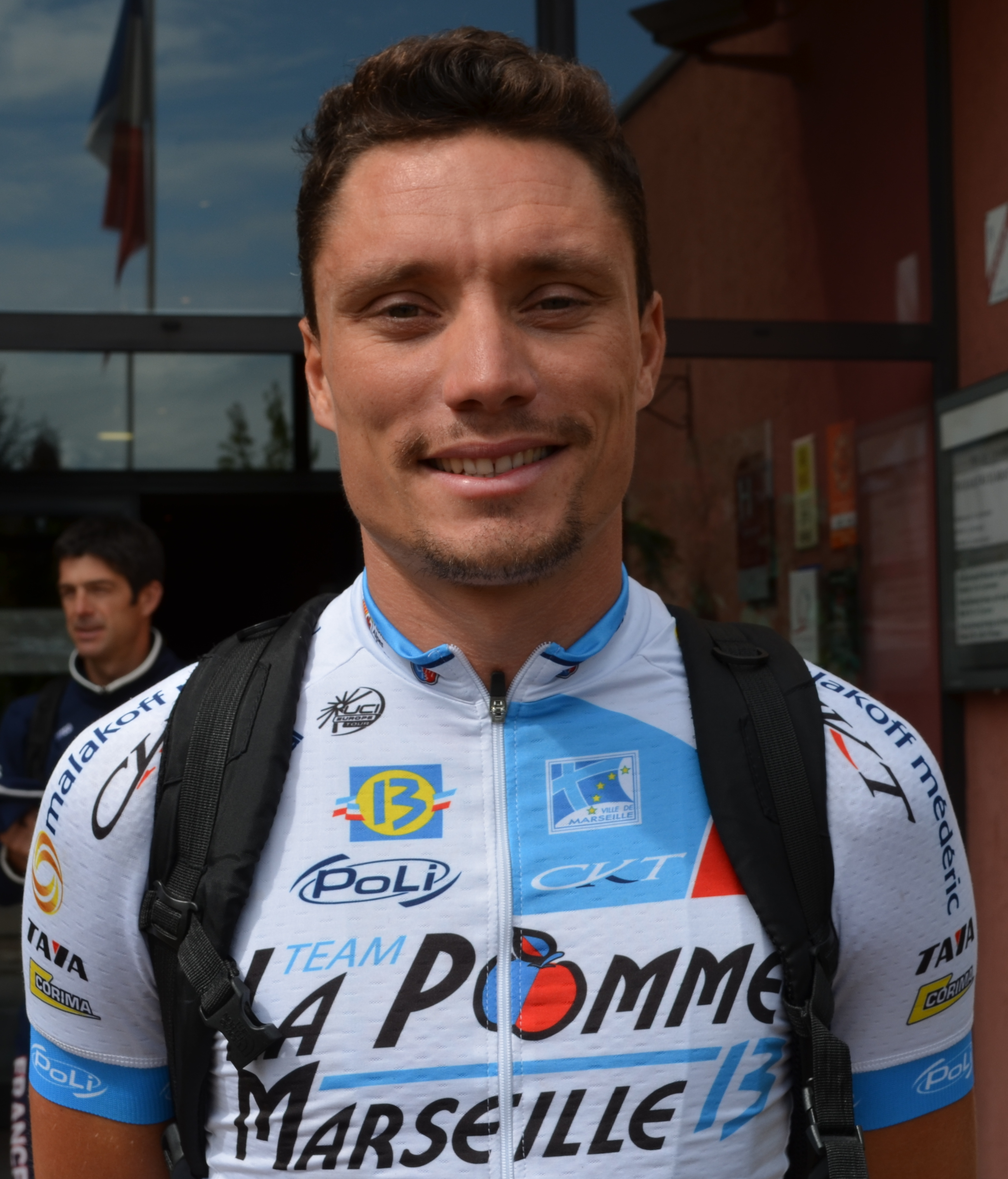
- Giraud in 2014.

Personal information
- Full name: Benjamin Giraud
- Born: 23 January 1986 (age 40) Marseille, France

Cycling career
- Sport: Cycling
- Current team: Delko
- Discipline: Road
- Role: Rider (retired); Directeur sportif

Amateur teams
- 2007–2010: AVC Aix-en-Provence
- 2009: Cofidis (stagiaire)

Professional team
- 2011–2017: La Pomme Marseille

Managerial team
- 2020–: Nippo–Delko–One Provence

Benjamin Giraud (born 23 January 1986 in Marseille) is a French former cyclist, who competed professionally for the Delko–Marseille Provence KTM team between 2011 and 2017. Since 2020, Giraud now works as a directeur sportif for the Delko team.

== Major results ==
2009
3rd Paris–Mantes-en-Yvelines
3rd Grand Prix de Bavay
2010
1st Stage 5 Tour de Franche-Comté
3rd Emirates Cup
2011
1st Stage 3 Circuit des Ardennes
3rd Cholet-Pays de Loire
2012
1st Grand Prix Souvenir Jean-Masse
10th Grand Prix de la Somme
2013
1st Stage 6 Tour de Taiwan
1st Stage 10 Tour of Qinghai Lake
2nd La Roue Tourangelle
4th Val d'Ille Classic
8th Châteauroux Classic
9th Overall Tour of China I

1st Points classification
1st Stages 2 & 5

10th Overall Tour de Picardie
10th Grand Prix de Denain
2014
1st Stage 2 Tour de Taiwan
4th Grand Prix de la Somme
5th Grand Prix de Fourmies
6th Châteauroux Classic
8th Grand Prix de Denain
2015
1st Stage 5 Tour of Hainan
1st Stage 3 (TTT) Circuit des Ardennes
4th Classica Corsica
5th Route Adélie
5th La Roue Tourangelle
9th Grand Prix La Marseillaise
2016
9th Route Adélie
2017
3rd Tro-Bro Léon
10th Grand Prix de Denain
10th Primus Classic
