= 2012 Vattenfall Cyclassics =

2012 UCI World Tour, race 23 of 28

Race details
- Dates: 19 August 2012
- Stages: 1
- Distance: 245.9 km (152.8 mi)
- Winning time: 6h 03' 19"

Results
	Winner	Arnaud Démare (France)	(FDJ–BigMat)
	Second	André Greipel (Germany)	(Lotto–Belisol)
	Third	Giacomo Nizzolo (Italy)	(RadioShack–Nissan)

The 2012 Vattenfall Cyclassics was the 17th running of the Vattenfall Cyclassics single-day cycling race. It was held, in and around Hamburg, Germany, on 19 August over a distance of 245.9 kilometres (152.8 miles) and was the twenty-third race of the 2012 UCI World Tour season.

In a mass sprint finish, the race was won by FDJ–BigMat rider Arnaud Démare, who became the first French rider to take victory in the event. Démare finished ahead of Lotto–Belisol's André Greipel, and RadioShack–Nissan's Giacomo Nizzolo, who completed the podium.

== Teams ==
As the Vattenfall Cyclassics was a UCI World Tour event, all 18 UCI ProTeams were invited automatically and obligated to send a squad. Two other squads – Argos–Shimano and Team NetApp – were given wildcard places into the race, and as such, formed the event's 20-team peloton.

The 20 teams that competed in the race were:

- Ag2r–La Mondiale
- Argos–Shimano
- Astana
- BMC Racing Team
- Euskaltel–Euskadi
- FDJ–BigMat
- Garmin–Sharp
- Team Katusha
- Lampre–ISD
- Liquigas–Cannondale
- Lotto–Belisol
- Movistar Team
- Team NetApp
- Omega Pharma–Quick-Step
- Orica–GreenEDGE
- Rabobank
- RadioShack–Nissan
- Saxo Bank–Tinkoff Bank
- Team Sky
- Vacansoleil–DCM

== Results ==
	Cyclist	Team	Time	UCI World Tour Points
1	Arnaud Démare (FRA)	FDJ–BigMat	6h 03' 19"	80
2	André Greipel (GER)	Lotto–Belisol	s.t.	60
3	Giacomo Nizzolo (ITA)	RadioShack–Nissan	s.t.	50
4	Tom Boonen (BEL)	Omega Pharma–Quick-Step	s.t.	40
5	Edvald Boasson Hagen (NOR)	Team Sky	s.t.	30
6	Mark Renshaw (AUS)	Rabobank	s.t.	22
7	Heinrich Haussler (AUS)	Garmin–Sharp	s.t.	14
8	Manuel Belletti (ITA)	Ag2r–La Mondiale	s.t.	10
9	Tom Veelers (NED)	Argos–Shimano	s.t.	–
10	Borut Božič (SLO)	Astana	s.t.	2
