= 2011 UCI Road World Championships – Men's under-23 road race =

Men's under-23 road race
2011 UCI Road World Championships

Race details
- Dates: 23 September 2011
- Stages: 1
- Distance: 168 km (104.4 mi)

The Men's under-23 road race of the 2011 UCI Road World Championships was a cycling event that took place on 23 September 2011 in Copenhagen, Denmark.

== Final classification ==
	Cyclist	Nation		Time
1st place, gold medalist(s)	Arnaud Démare	France	in	3 h 52 min 16 s
2nd place, silver medalist(s)	Adrien Petit	France	+	0 s
3rd place, bronze medalist(s)	Andrew Fenn	Great Britain		0 s
4	Rüdiger Selig	Germany		0 s
5	Marco Haller	Austria		0 s
6	Filippo Fortin	Italy		0 s
7	Wouter Wippert	Netherlands		0 s
8	Alexey Tsatevich	Russia		0 s
9	Tosh Van der Sande	Belgium		0 s
10	Andris Smirnovs	Latvia		0 s
