= 2017 Paris–Roubaix =

Cycling race

2017 UCI World Tour, race 15 of 37
- Event poster with former winner Tom Boonen

Race details
- Dates: 9 April 2017
- Stages: 1
- Distance: 257 km (160 mi)

Results
	Winner	Greg Van Avermaet (BEL)	(BMC Racing Team)
	Second	Zdeněk Štybar (CZE)	(Quick-Step Floors)
	Third	Sebastian Langeveld (NED)	(Cannondale–Drapac)

The 2017 Paris–Roubaix was a road cycling one-day race that took place on 9 April 2017. It was the 115th edition of the Paris–Roubaix and was the fifteenth event of the 2017 UCI World Tour.

It was won by Greg Van Avermaet (BMC Racing Team) in a five-man sprint – for his first Monument classic victory – ahead of Quick-Step Floors rider Zdeněk Štybar and Sebastian Langeveld of Cannondale–Drapac. The average speed of 45.2 km/h was a record.

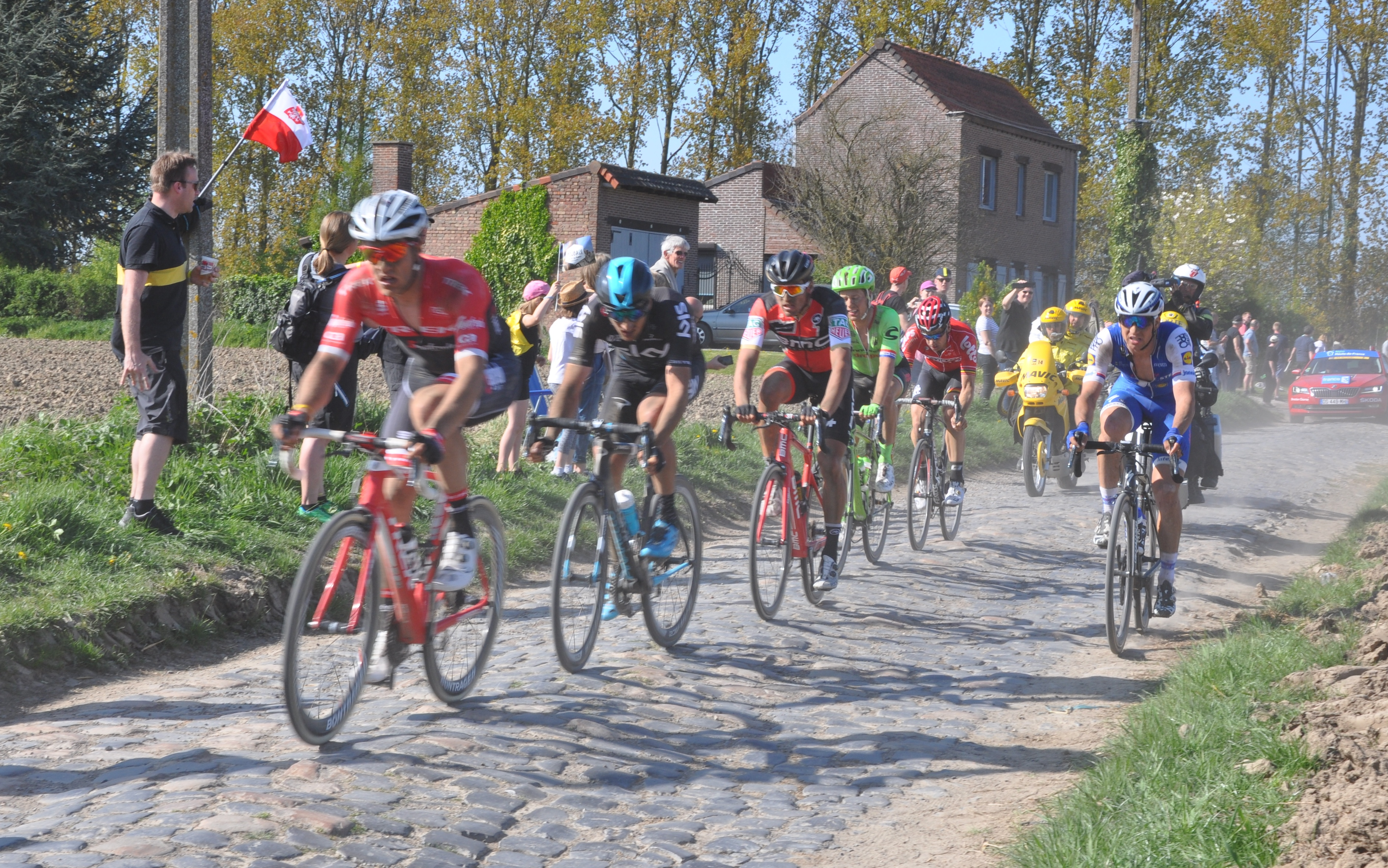
The winning breakaway in Bourghelles, at 26 km (16 mi) from the finish. From left to right: Jasper Stuyven, Gianni Moscon, Greg Van Avermaet, Sebastian Langeveld, Jürgen Roelandts and Zdeněk Štybar

== Teams ==
As Paris-Roubaix is a UCI World Tour event, all 18 UCI World Teams were invited automatically and were obliged to send a squad. In February 2017, the race organisers announced the seven UCI Professional Continental teams that had received wildcard invitations, completing the 25-team peloton.

UCI WorldTeams

- AG2R La Mondiale
- Astana
- BMC Racing Team
- Bora–Hansgrohe
- Cannondale–Drapac
- Team Dimension Data
- FDJ
- Team Katusha–Alpecin
- Lotto–Soudal
- Movistar Team
- Orica–Scott
- Quick-Step Floors
- Team Sky
- Team Sunweb
- Bahrain–Merida
- Trek–Segafredo
- LottoNL–Jumbo
- UAE Team Emirates

UCI Professional Continental teams

- Cofidis
- Delko–Marseille Provence KTM
- Direct Énergie
- Fortuneo–Vital Concept
- Roompot–Nederlandse Loterij
- Sport Vlaanderen–Baloise
- Wanty–Groupe Gobert

== Result ==
Result
Rank	Rider	Team	Time
1	Greg Van Avermaet (BEL)	BMC Racing Team	5h 41' 07"
2	Zdeněk Štybar (CZE)	Quick-Step Floors	+ 0"
3	Sebastian Langeveld (NED)	Cannondale–Drapac	+ 0"
4	Jasper Stuyven (BEL)	Trek–Segafredo	+ 0"
5	Gianni Moscon (ITA)	Team Sky	+ 0"
6	Arnaud Démare (FRA)	FDJ	+ 12"
7	André Greipel (GER)	Lotto–Soudal	+ 12"
8	Edward Theuns (BEL)	Trek–Segafredo	+ 12"
9	Adrien Petit (FRA)	Direct Énergie	+ 12"
10	John Degenkolb (GER)	Trek–Segafredo	+ 12"
