= 2017 Tro-Bro Léon =

Cycling race

2017 UCI Europe Tour

Race details
- Dates: 17 April 2017
- Stages: 1
- Distance: 203.9 km (126.7 mi)
- Winning time: 4h 50' 22"

Results
	Winner	Damien Gaudin (FRA)	(Armée de Terre)
	Second	Frederik Backaert (BEL)	(Wanty–Groupe Gobert)
	Third	Benjamin Giraud (FRA)	(Delko–Marseille Provence KTM)

The 2017 Tro-Bro Léon was a one-day road cycling race that took place on 17 April 2017. It was the 34th edition of the Tro-Bro Léon and was rated as a 1.1 event as part of the 2017 UCI Europe Tour. It was also the eighth event of the 2017 French Road Cycling Cup.

The race was won by Damien Gaudin (Armée de Terre).

== Teams ==
Nineteen teams were invited to take part in the race. These included two UCI WorldTeams, eight UCI Professional Continental teams and nine UCI Continental teams.

UCI WorldTeams

- AG2R La Mondiale
- FDJ

UCI Professional Continental Teams

- Cofidis
- Delko–Marseille Provence KTM
- Direct Énergie
- Fortuneo–Vital Concept
- Israel Cycling Academy
- Team Manzana Postobón
- Vérandas Willems–Crelan
- Wanty–Groupe Gobert

UCI Continental Teams

- Armée de Terre
- Cibel–Cebon
- Team ColoQuick–Cult
- Delta Cycling Rotterdam
- Euskadi Basque Country–Murias
- HP BTP–Auber93
- Joker Icopal
- Madison Genesis
- Roubaix–Lille Métropole

== Result ==
Result
Rank	Rider	Team	Time
1	Damien Gaudin (FRA)	Armée de Terre	4h 50' 22"
2	Frederik Backaert (BEL)	Wanty–Groupe Gobert	+ 2"
3	Benjamin Giraud (FRA)	Delko–Marseille Provence KTM	+ 7"
4	Laurent Pichon (FRA)	Fortuneo–Vital Concept	+ 7"
5	Kévin Le Cunff (FRA)	HP BTP–Auber93	+ 7"
6	Mathias De Witte (BEL)	Cibel–Cebon	+ 7"
7	Arnaud Démare (FRA)	FDJ	+ 7"
8	Damien Touzé (FRA)	HP BTP–Auber93	+ 7"
9	Sylvain Chavanel (FRA)	Direct Énergie	+ 7"
10	Hugo Hofstetter (FRA)	Cofidis	+ 7"
