= 2020 UCI ProSeries =

International road cycling contest

- First edition of the UCI ProSeries

Details
- Location: Europe, Asia, Argentina
- Races: 25

The 2020 UCI ProSeries is the inaugural season of the UCI ProSeries, the second tier road cycling tour, below the UCI World Tour, but above the various regional UCI Continental Circuits.

The 2020 season initially consisted of 58 events of which 31 are one-day races (1.Pro) and 27 are stage races (2.Pro). There are 50 events in Europe, 5 in Asia, and 3 in America. The new calendar, which was presented in mid-May, consists of 29 events.

== Winners by race ==
| New | Old | Country | Date | Race | Winner | Team |
|---|---|---|---|---|---|---|
| 2.Pro | 2.1 | ARG | 26 January – 2 February | Vuelta a San Juan | Remco Evenepoel (BEL) | Deceuninck–Quick-Step |
| 2.Pro | 2.1 | ESP | 5–9 February | Volta a la Comunitat Valenciana | Tadej Pogačar (SLO) | UAE Team Emirates |
| 2.Pro | 2.HC | MAS | 6–14 February | Tour de Langkawi | Danilo Celano (ITA) | Team Sapura Cycling |
| 2.Pro | 2.HC | OMA | 11–16 February | Tour of Oman | Cancelled | |
| 2.Pro | 2.1 | FRA | 13–16 February | Tour de la Provence | Nairo Quintana (COL) | Arkéa–Samsic |
| 1.Pro | 1.HC | ITA | 16 February | Trofeo Laigueglia | Giulio Ciccone (ITA) | Italy (national team) |
| 1.Pro | 1.HC | ESP | 16 February | Clásica de Almería | Pascal Ackermann (GER) | Bora–Hansgrohe |
| 2.Pro | 2.HC | ESP | 19–23 February | Vuelta a Andalucía | Jakob Fuglsang (DEN) | Astana |
| 2.Pro | 2.HC | POR | 19–23 February | Volta ao Algarve | Remco Evenepoel (BEL) | Deceuninck–Quick-Step |
| 2.Pro | 2.HC | CHN | 23 February – 1 March | Tour of Hainan | Cancelled | |
| 1.Pro | 1.1 | FRA | 29 February | Faun-Ardèche Classic | Rémi Cavagna (FRA) | Deceuninck–Quick-Step |
| 1.Pro | 1.HC | BEL | 1 March | Kuurne–Brussels–Kuurne | Kasper Asgreen (DEN) | Deceuninck–Quick-Step |
| 1.Pro | 1.1 | FRA | 1 March | Royal Bernard Drôme Classic | Simon Clarke (AUS) | EF Pro Cycling |
| 1.Pro | 1.HC | ITA | 8 March | GP Industria & Artigianato | Cancelled | |
| 1.Pro | 1.HC | BEL | 18 March | Nokere Koerse | Cancelled | |
| 1.Pro | 1.HC | FRA | 19 March | Grand Prix de Denain | Cancelled | |
| 1.Pro | 1.HC | BEL | 20 March | Bredene Koksijde Classic | Cancelled | |
| 1.Pro | 1.1 | ESP | 4 April | GP Miguel Induráin | Cancelled | |
| 2.Pro | 2.UWT | TUR | 12–19 April | Presidential Tour of Turkey | Cancelled | |
| 1.Pro | 1.1 | FRA | 19 April | Tro-Bro Léon | Cancelled | |
| 2.Pro | 2.HC | ITA | 20–24 April | Tour of the Alps | Cancelled | |
| 2.Pro | 2.HC | GBR | 30 April – 3 May | Tour de Yorkshire | Cancelled | |
| 2.Pro | 2.HC | FRA | 5–10 May | 4 Jours de Dunkerque | Cancelled | |
| 1.Pro | 1.1 | FRA | 16 May | Grand Prix de Plumelec-Morbihan | Cancelled | |
| 2.Pro | 2.HC | NOR | 26–31 May | Tour of Norway | Cancelled | |
| 2.Pro | 2.1 | FRA | 28–31 May | Boucles de la Mayenne | Cancelled | |
| 2.Pro | 2.1 | NED | 3–7 June | ZLM Tour | Cancelled | |
| 2.Pro | 2.HC | BEL | 10–14 June | Baloise Belgium Tour | Cancelled | |
| 2.Pro | 2.HC | SLO | 24–28 June | Tour of Slovenia | Cancelled | |
| 2.Pro | 2.1 | AUT | 27 June – 3 July | Tour of Austria | Cancelled | |
| 2.Pro | 2.HC | ESP | 28 July – 1 August | Vuelta a Burgos | Remco Evenepoel (BEL) | Deceuninck–Quick-Step |
| 2.Pro | 2.HC | CHN | 26 July – 2 August | Tour of Qinghai Lake | Cancelled | |
| 2.Pro | 2.HC | USA | 3–9 August | Tour of Utah | Cancelled | |
| 1.Pro | 1.HC | ITA | 3 August | Gran Trittico Lombardo | Gorka Izagirre (ESP) | Astana |
| 1.Pro | 1.HC | ITA | 5 August | Milano–Torino | Arnaud Démare (FRA) | Groupama–FDJ |
| 2.Pro | 2.HC | NOR | 6–9 August | Arctic Race of Norway | Cancelled | |
| 1.Pro | 1.HC | ITA | 12 August | Gran Piemonte | George Bennett (NZL) | Team Jumbo–Visma |
| 1.Pro | 1.1 | BEL | 15 August | Dwars door het Hageland | Jonas Rickaert (BEL) | Alpecin–Fenix |
| 2.Pro | 2.HC | BEL | 16–19 August | Tour de Wallonie | Arnaud Démare (FRA) | Groupama–FDJ |
| 1.Pro | 1.HC | ITA | 18 August | Giro dell'Emilia | Aleksandr Vlasov (RUS) | Astana |
| 2.Pro | 2.HC | GER | 20–23 August | Deutschland Tour | Cancelled | |
| 1.Pro | 1.HC | BEL | 30 August | Brussels Cycling Classic | Tim Merlier (BEL) | Alpecin–Fenix |
| 2.Pro | 2.HC | DEN | 1–5 September | Danmark Rundt | Cancelled | |
| 1.Pro | N/A | USA | 6 September | Maryland Cycling Classic | Cancelled | |
| 2.Pro | 2.HC | GBR | 6–13 September | Tour of Britain | Cancelled | |
| 1.Pro | 1.HC | BEL | 12 September | Tour de l'Eurométropole | Cancelled | |
| 1.Pro | 1.HC | FRA | 13 September | Grand Prix de Fourmies | Cancelled | |
| 2.Pro | 2.HC | LUX | 15–19 September | Tour de Luxembourg | Diego Ulissi (ITA) | UAE Team Emirates |
| 1.Pro | 1.1 | BEL | 16 September | Grand Prix de Wallonie | Cancelled | |
| 1.Pro | 1.1 | ITA | 17 September | Coppa Sabatini | Dion Smith (NZL) | Mitchelton–Scott |
| 1.Pro | 1.HC | BEL | 19 September | Primus Classic | Cancelled | |
| 1.Pro | 1.HC | GER | 3 October | Münsterland Giro | Cancelled | |
| 1.Pro | 1.1 | ITA | 5 October | Coppa Bernocchi | Cancelled | |
| 1.Pro | 1.HC | ITA | 6 October | Tre Valli Varesine | Cancelled | |
| 1.Pro | 1.HC | BEL | 7 October | Brabantse Pijl | Julian Alaphilippe (FRA) | Deceuninck–Quick-Step |
| 1.Pro | 1.HC | FRA | 11 October | Paris–Tours | Casper Pedersen (DEN) | Team Sunweb |
| 1.Pro | 1.HC | BEL | 14 October | Scheldeprijs | Caleb Ewan (AUS) | Lotto–Soudal |
| 1.Pro | 1.HC | JPN | 18 October | Japan Cup | Cancelled | |
