= 2022 Paris–Tours =

- 2022 UCI ProSeries

Race details
- Dates: 9 October 2022
- Stages: 1
- Distance: 213.5 km (132.7 mi)
- Winning time: 4h 53' 01"

Results
	Winner	Arnaud Démare (FRA)	(Groupama–FDJ)
	Second	Edward Theuns (BEL)	(Trek–Segafredo)
	Third	Sam Bennett (IRL)	(Bora–Hansgrohe)

The 2022 Paris–Tours was the 116th edition of the Paris–Tours road cycling classic. It was held on 9 October 2022 as part of the 2022 UCI ProSeries calendar.

== Teams ==
14 of the 18 UCI WorldTeams, six UCI ProTeams, and four UCI Continental teams made up the 25 teams that participated in the race. Alpecin–Deceuninck, Ineos Grenadiers, Cofidis, Israel–Premier Tech, Team BikeExchange–Jayco were the only teams to not enter a full squad of seven riders. Of the 160 riders who started the race, 128 finished. Philippe Gilbert, Niki Terpstra and Sebastian Langeveld retired as professional road cyclists after the race.

UCI WorldTeams

- AG2R Citroën Team
- Bora–Hansgrohe
- Cofidis
- EF Education–EasyPost
- Groupama–FDJ
- Ineos Grenadiers
- Intermarché–Wanty–Gobert Matériaux
- Israel–Premier Tech
- Lotto–Soudal
- Team BikeExchange–Jayco
- Team DSM
- Team Jumbo–Visma
- Trek–Segafredo
- UAE Team Emirates

UCI ProTeams

- Alpecin–Deceuninck
- Arkéa–Samsic
- B&B Hotels–KTM
- Bingoal Pauwels Sauces WB
- Team TotalEnergies
- Uno-X Pro Cycling Team

UCI Continental Teams

- Go Sport–Roubaix–Lille Métropole
- Nice Métropole Côte d'Azur
- St. Michel–Auber93
- Team UC Nantes Atlantique

== Result ==
Result
Rank	Rider	Team	Time
1	Arnaud Démare (FRA)	Groupama–FDJ	4h 53' 01"
2	Edward Theuns (BEL)	Trek–Segafredo	+ 0"
3	Sam Bennett (IRL)	Bora–Hansgrohe	+ 0"
4	Simone Consonni (ITA)	Cofidis	+ 0"
5	Luca Mozzato (ITA)	B&B Hotels–KTM	+ 0"
6	Dries van Gestel (BEL)	Team TotalEnergies	+ 0"
7	Sandy Dujardin (FRA)	Team TotalEnergies	+ 0"
8	Matis Louvel (FRA)	Arkéa–Samsic	+ 0"
9	Amaury Capiot (BEL)	Arkéa–Samsic	+ 0"
10	Hugo Hofstetter (FRA)	Arkéa–Samsic	+ 0"
