= Amonines =

Amonines Monene (Walloon)
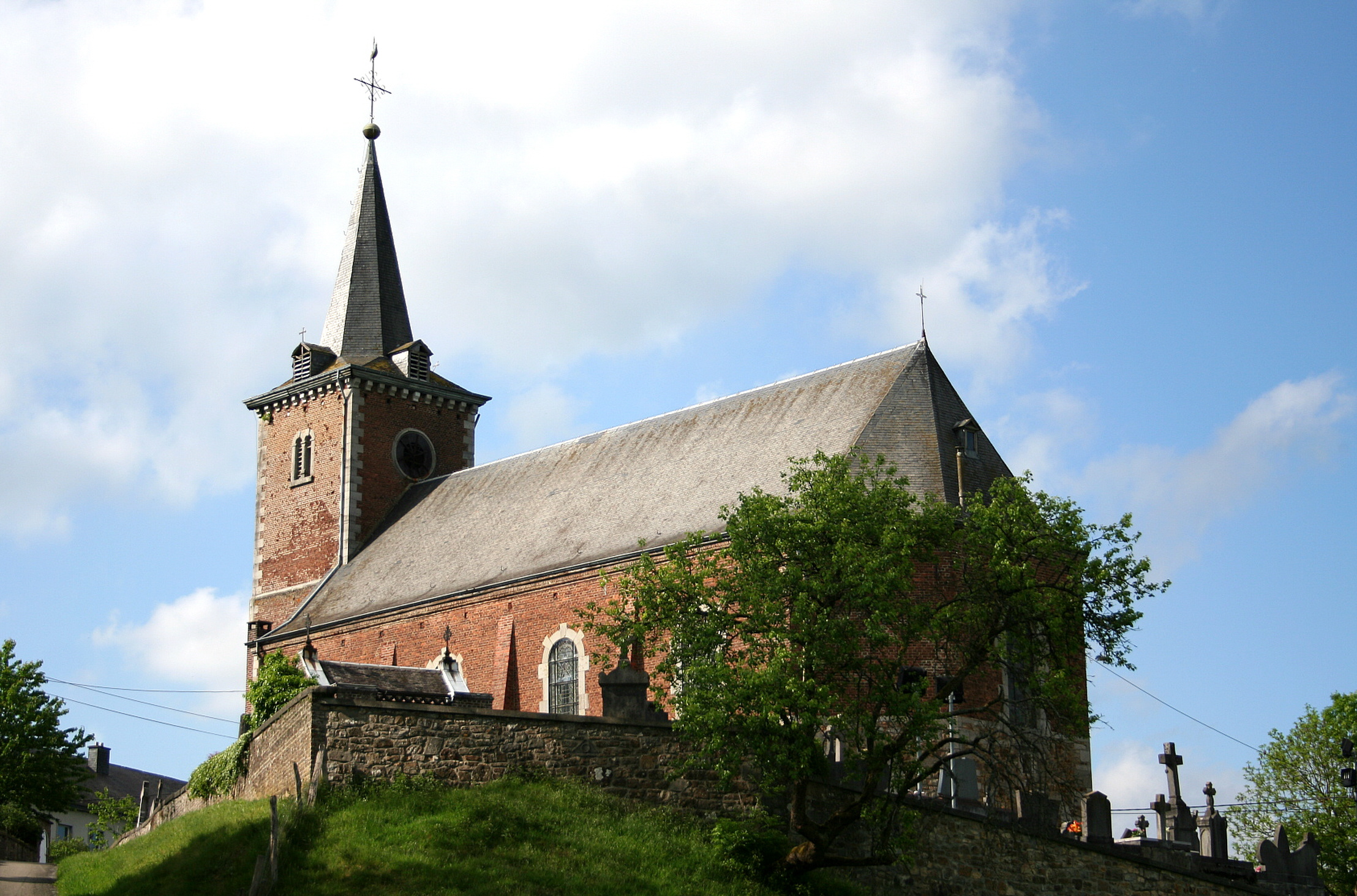
- Amonines village church

- Location within Belgium Location within Europe
- Coordinates: 50°15.95′N 05°33.55′E
- Country: Belgium
- Region: Wallonia
- Province: Luxembourg
- Municipality: Érezée

Amonines (French pronunciation: [amɔnin]; Walloon: Monene) is a village of Wallonia and a district of the municipality of Érezée, located in the province of Luxembourg, Belgium.

The village church dates from 1824, and was built with money donated by the Philippin family. The same family also founded a hospice in the village, as well as a chapel (1873).
