= 2013 Grand Prix de Denain =

Race details
- Dates: 11 April 2013
- Stages: 1
- Distance: 199 km (123.7 mi)
- Winning time: 4h 55' 35"

Results
	Winner	Arnaud Démare (FRA)
	Second	Bryan Coquard (FRA)
	Third	Nacer Bouhanni (FRA)

The 2013 Grand Prix de Denain was the 55th edition of the Grand Prix de Denain cycle race and was held on 11 April 2013. The race started and finished in Denain. The race was won by Arnaud Démare.

== General classification ==
Final general classification

Rank	Rider	Time
1	Arnaud Démare (FRA)	4h 55' 35"
2	Bryan Coquard (FRA)	+ 0"
3	Nacer Bouhanni (FRA)	+ 0"
4	Benoît Drujon (FRA)	+ 0"
5	Takashi Miyazawa (JPN)	+ 0"
6	Adrien Petit (FRA)	+ 0"
7	Julien Duval (FRA)	+ 0"
8	Danilo Napolitano (ITA)	+ 0"
9	Barry Markus (NED)	+ 0"
10	Benjamin Giraud (FRA)	+ 0"
