= 2017 Grand Prix de Denain =

2017 UCI Europe Tour

Race details
- Dates: 13 April 2017
- Stages: 1
- Distance: 196.4 km (122.0 mi)
- Winning time: 4h 30' 01"

Results
	Winner	Arnaud Démare (FRA)	(FDJ)
	Second	Nacer Bouhanni (FRA)	(Cofidis)
	Third	Juan Sebastián Molano (COL)	(Team Manzana Postobón)

The 2017 Grand Prix de Denain was the 59th edition of the Grand Prix de Denain road cycling one day race. It was part of the 2017 UCI Europe Tour, held on 13 April 2017, as a 1.HC categorised race.

In a bunch sprint finish, FDJ rider Arnaud Démare won the race ahead of Nacer Bouhanni (Cofidis), while the podium was completed by Juan Sebastián Molano from Team Manzana Postobón.

== Teams ==
Eighteen teams were invited to take part in the race. These included two UCI WorldTeams, thirteen UCI Professional Continental teams and three UCI Continental teams.

UCI WorldTeams

- AG2R La Mondiale
- FDJ

UCI Professional Continental Teams

- Bardiani–CSF
- Cofidis
- Delko–Marseille Provence KTM
- Direct Énergie
- Gazprom–RusVelo
- Israel Cycling Academy
- Team Manzana Postobón
- Roompot–Nederlandse Loterij
- Sport Vlaanderen–Baloise
- Vérandas Willems–Crelan
- Wanty–Groupe Gobert
- WB Veranclassic Aqua Protect
- Fortuneo–Vital Concept

UCI Continental Teams

- Armée de Terre
- HP BTP–Auber93
- Roubaix–Lille Métropole

== Result ==
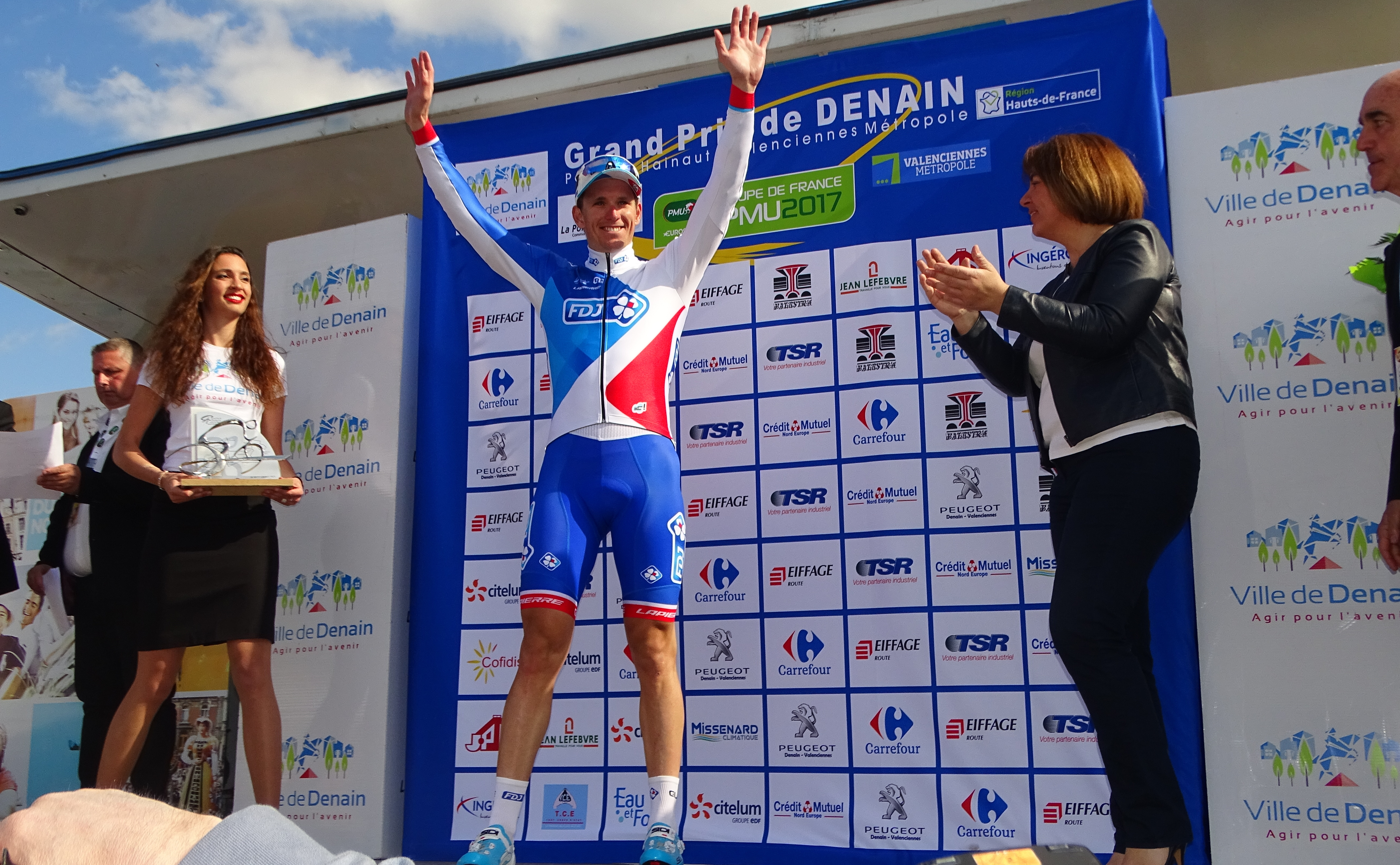
FDJ rider Arnaud Démare won the race, after prevailing in the bunch sprint finish.

Result
Rank	Rider	Team	Time
1	Arnaud Démare (FRA)	FDJ	4h 30' 01"
2	Nacer Bouhanni (FRA)	Cofidis	+ 0"
3	Juan Sebastián Molano (COL)	Team Manzana Postobón	+ 0"
4	Boris Vallée (BEL)	Fortuneo–Vital Concept	+ 0"
5	Roy Jans (BEL)	WB Veranclassic Aqua Protect	+ 0"
6	Jérémy Lecroq (FRA)	Roubaix–Lille Métropole	+ 0"
7	Coen Vermeltfoort (NED)	Roompot–Nederlandse Loterij	+ 0"
8	Damien Touzé (FRA)	HP BTP–Auber93	+ 0"
9	Bert Van Lerberghe (BEL)	Sport Vlaanderen–Baloise	+ 0"
10	Benjamin Giraud (FRA)	Delko–Marseille Provence KTM	+ 0"
