= Adrien Petit =

French road cyclist

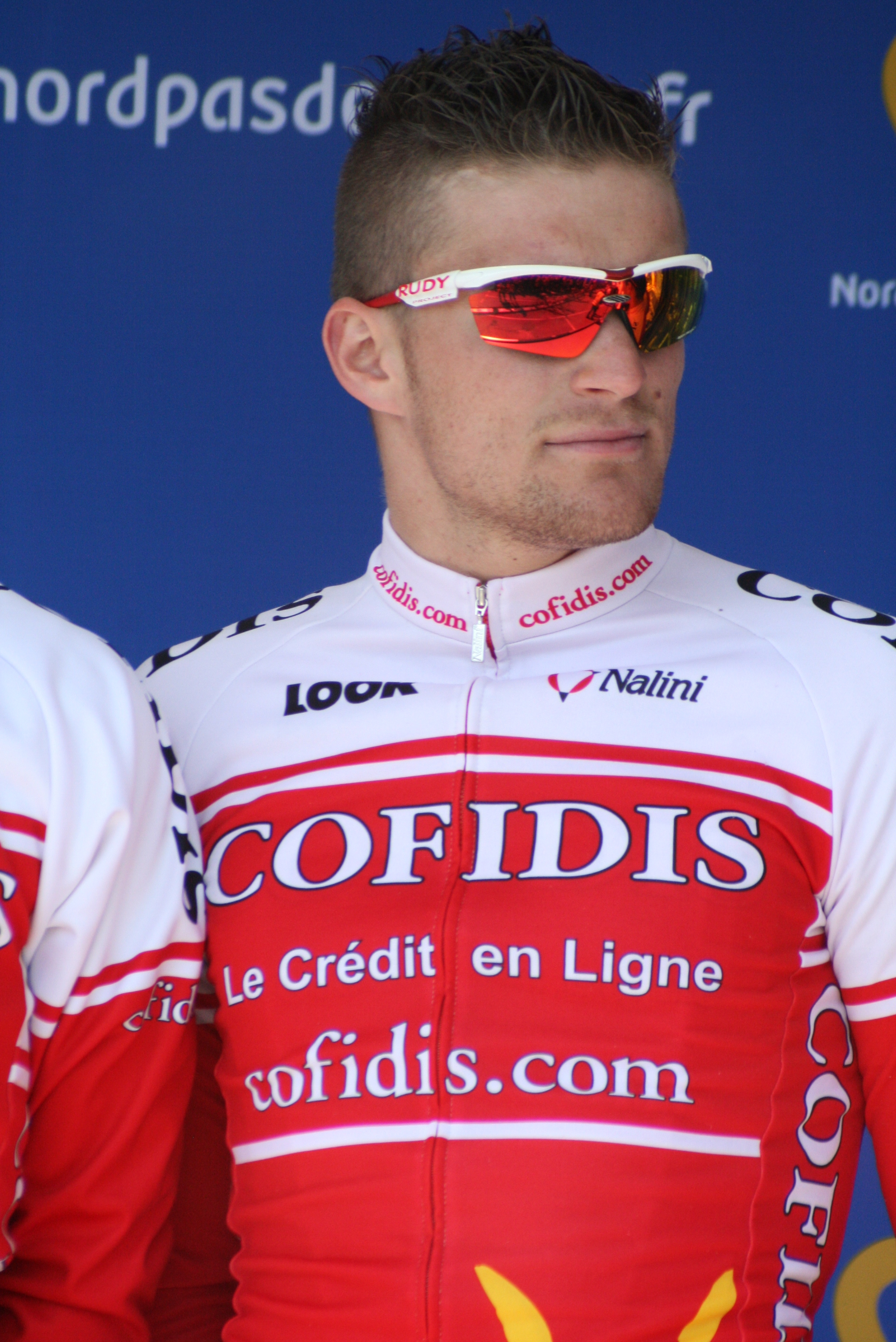
- Petit at the 2011 Four Days of Dunkirk

Personal information
- Full name: Adrien Petit
- Nickname: Le bison
- Born: 26 September 1990 (age 36) Arras, France
- Height: 1.88 m (6 ft 2 in)
- Weight: 80 kg (176 lb; 12 st 8 lb)

Cycling career
- Sport: Cycling
- Current team: Intermarché–Wanty
- Discipline: Road
- Role: Rider
- Rider type: Sprinter; Classics specialist

Amateur teams
- 2009–2010: CC Nogent-sur-Oise
- 2010: Cofidis (stagiaire)

Professional teams
- 2011–2015: Cofidis
- 2016–2021: Direct Énergie
- 2022–: Intermarché–Wanty–Gobert Matériaux
Medal record
Representing France
Men's road bicycle racing
World Championships
Silver medal – second place	2011 Copenhagen	Under-23 road race

Adrien Petit (French: [adʁijɛ̃ pəti]; born 26 September 1990) is a French racing cyclist, who currently rides for UCI WorldTeam Intermarché–Wanty. In September 2015 Direct Énergie announced that Petit would join them for the 2016 season, after five years with Cofidis.

== Major results ==
2008
3rd Chrono des Nations Juniors
2009
6th Trophée des Champions
2010
1st Stage 2 Tour de Normandie
2nd Grand Prix de la ville de Pérenchies
3rd Road race, National Under-23 Road Championships
2011
2nd Road race, UCI Under-23 Road World Championships
3rd Binche–Tournai–Binche
4th Grand Prix de Fourmies
9th Overall Tour de Wallonie Picarde
9th Kuurne–Brussels–Kuurne
9th Le Samyn
2012
2nd Binche–Tournai–Binche
3rd Road race, National Road Championships
3rd Le Samyn
4th Cholet-Pays de Loire
6th Halle–Ingooigem
9th Grand Prix de la Somme
2013 (1 pro win)
1st Stage 4 La Tropicale Amissa Bongo
1st Points classification, Driedaagse van West-Vlaanderen
3rd Le Samyn
5th Halle–Ingooigem
6th Grand Prix de Denain
7th Trofeo Palma de Mallorca
8th Binche–Chimay–Binche
2014 (1)
1st Tro-Bro Léon
3rd La Roue Tourangelle
5th Trofeo Palma
8th Kampioenschap van Vlaanderen
10th Halle–Ingooigem
2015 (1)
1st Prologue Tour de Luxembourg
2016 (4)
1st Overall La Tropicale Amissa Bongo

1st Stages 3, 5 & 6 (ITT)

7th Omloop Het Nieuwsblad
8th Binche–Chimay–Binche
10th Paris–Roubaix
2017 (2)
1st Grand Prix de la Somme
1st Stage 6 Four Days of Dunkirk
9th Paris–Roubaix
10th Omloop Het Nieuwsblad
2018
1st Paris–Troyes
4th Le Samyn
8th Overall La Tropicale Amissa Bongo
10th Grand Prix de Denain
2019
4th Schaal Sels
4th Kampioenschap van Vlaanderen
6th Gent–Wevelgem
8th Grand Prix de la Somme
2022
3rd Grand Prix de Denain
6th Paris–Roubaix
2023
Combativity award Stage 15 Tour de France

=== Grand Tour general classification results timeline ===
Grand Tour	2013	2014	2015	2016	2017	2018	2019	2020	2021	2022	2023	2024
Giro d'Italia	—	—	—	—	—	—	—	—	—	—	—	DNF
Tour de France	—	156	—	164	126	—	—	—	—	112	143	—
Vuelta a España	130	—	—	—	—	—	—	—	—	—	—	—

Legend
—	Did not compete
DNF	Did not finish
