= Fisenne =

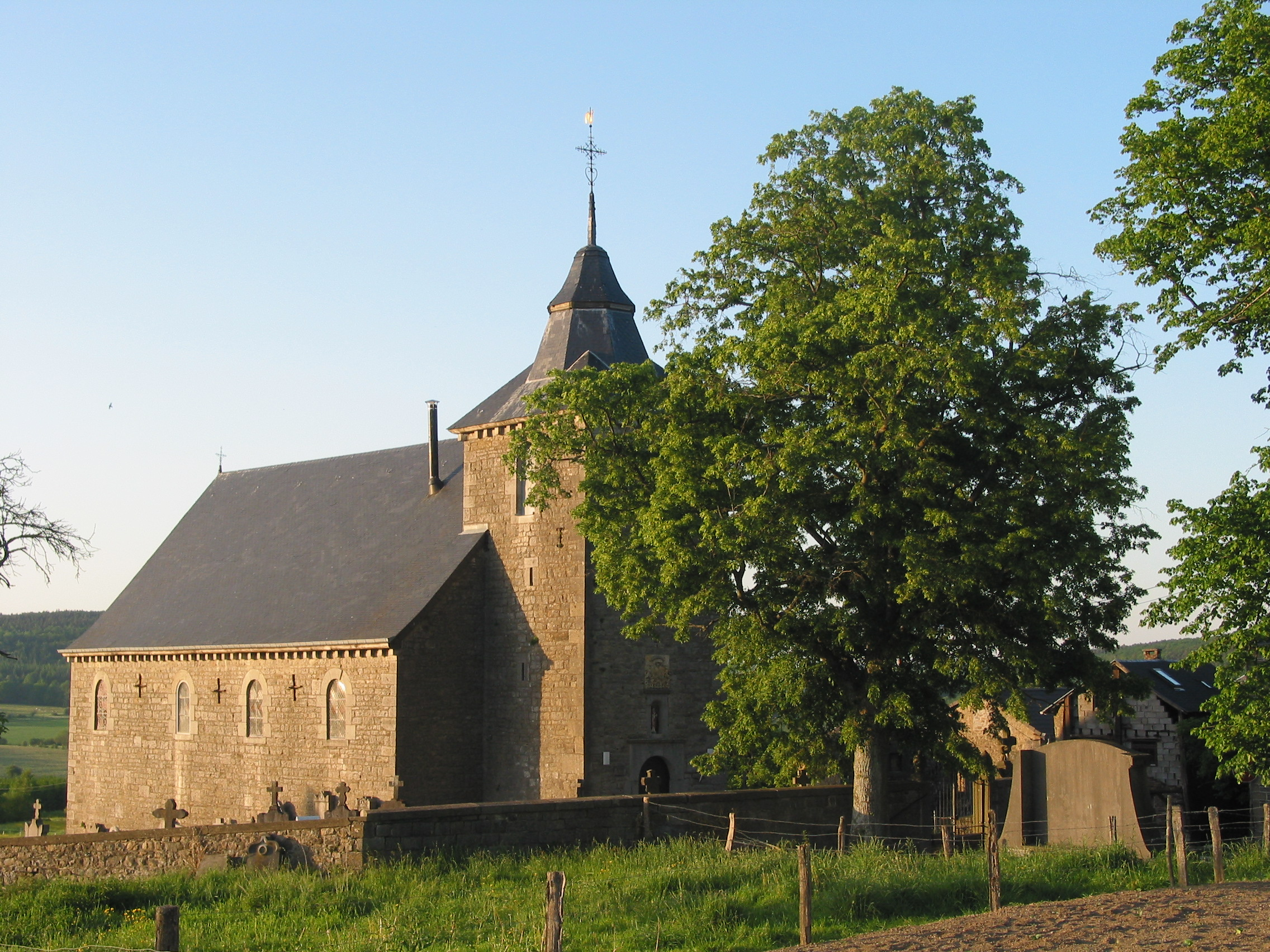
- Fisenne

- Location within Belgium Location within Europe
- Coordinates: 50°17′29″N 05°32′06″E
- Country: Belgium
- Region: Wallonia
- Province: Luxembourg
- Municipality: Érezée

Fisenne (French pronunciation: [fizɛn]) is a village of Wallonia in the municipality of Érezée, district of Soy, located in the province of Luxembourg, Belgium.

Fisenne contains a medieval fortified farm, Château-ferme de Fisenne, dating from the 12th century and originally part of the estate of the prince-bishop of the abbey of Stavelot. The chapel of the village dates from 1713. The village mill traces its origins to 1314, and was constructed by the lords of Durbuy. A 16th-century altarpiece originally located in the village church is today on display in the Gaspar Museum in Arlon.
