= Mormont, Érezée =

Mormont Moirmont (Walloon)
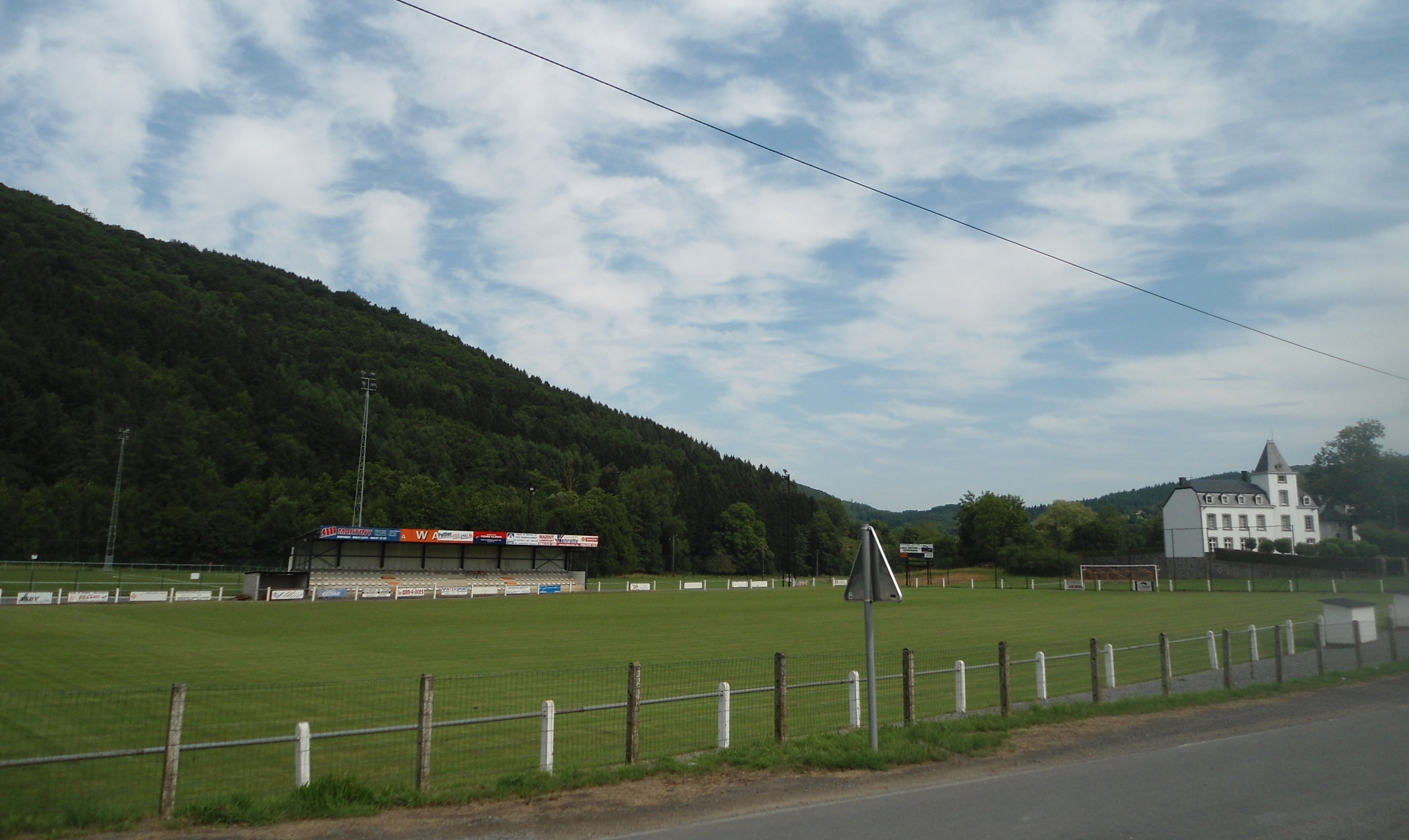
- Mormont

- Location within Belgium Location within Europe
- Coordinates: 50°19′55″N 05°36′55″E
- Country: Belgium
- Region: Wallonia
- Province: Luxembourg
- Municipality: Érezée

Mormont (French pronunciation: [mɔʁmɔ̃]; Walloon: Moirmont) is a village of Wallonia and a district of the municipality of Érezée, located in the province of Luxembourg, Belgium.

The village is located at an altitude of 284 metres (932 ft) above sea level. The village is mentioned in written sources as "Mormont" in 1105. Until 1793, the village was a dependency of the provostry of Durbuy.
