= Arnaud Démare =

French road racing cyclist (born 1991)

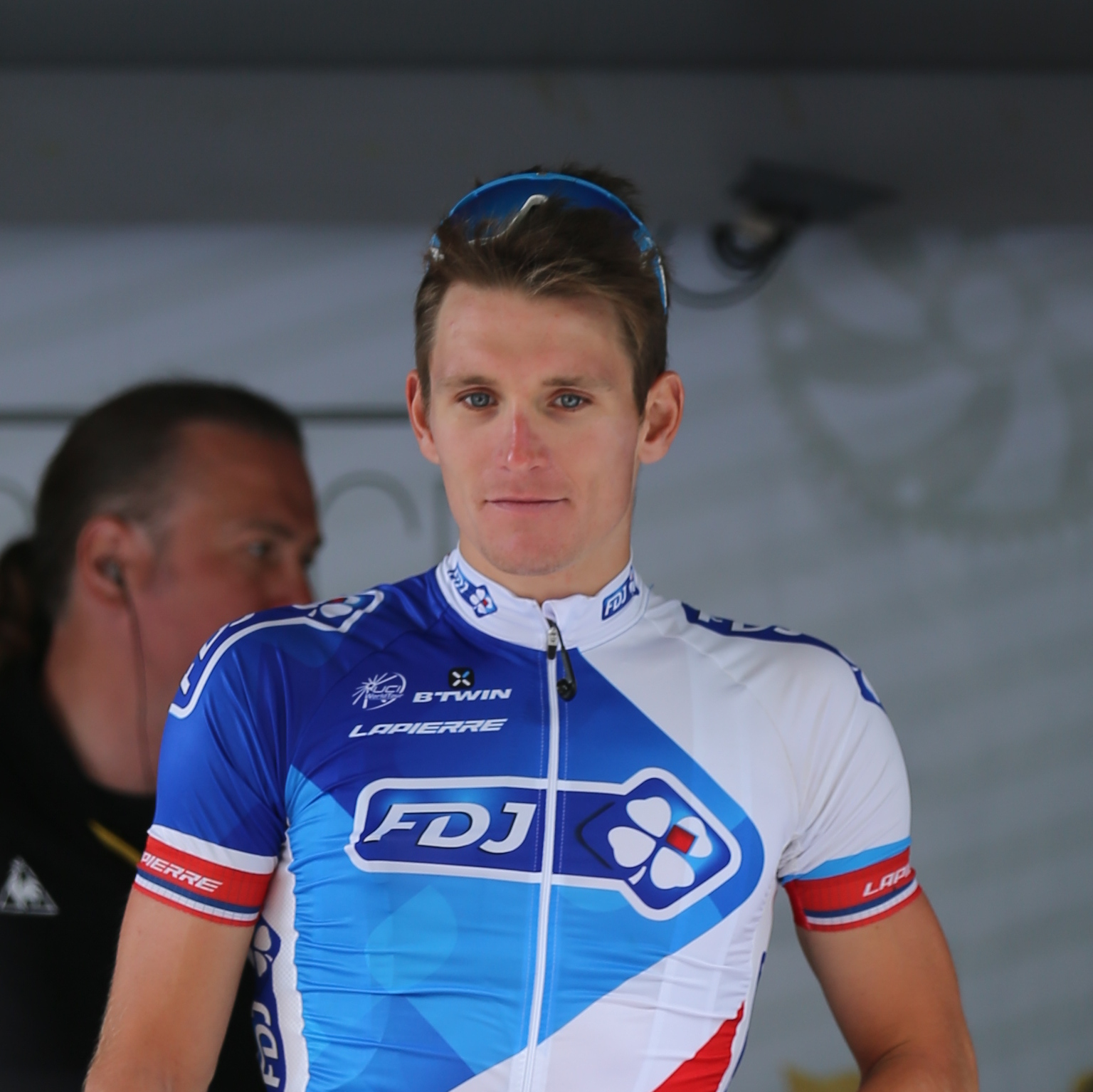
- Démare at the 2015 Tour de France

Personal information
- Full name: Arnaud Démare
- Nickname: The French Rocket
- Born: 26 August 1991 (age 35) Beauvais, France
- Height: 1.82 m (5 ft 11 1/2 in)
- Weight: 76 kg (168 lb; 12 st 0 lb)

Cycling career
- Sport: Cycling
- Current team: Arkéa–B&B Hotels
- Discipline: Road
- Role: Rider
- Rider type: Sprinter

Amateur teams
- 2008–2009: Team Wasquehal
- 2010–2011: CC Nogent-sur-Oise
- 2011: FDJ (stagiaire)

Professional teams
- 2012–2023: FDJ–BigMat
- 2023–2025: Arkéa–Samsic

Major wins
- Grand Tours Tour de France 2 individual stages (2017, 2018) Giro d'Italia Points classification (2020, 2022) 8 individual stages (2019, 2020, 2022) Stage races Four Days of Dunkirk (2013, 2014) Tour de Wallonie (2020) Boucles de la Mayenne (2021) One-day races and Classics National Road Race Championships (2014, 2017, 2020) Milan–San Remo (2016) Hamburg Cyclassics (2012) Paris–Tours (2021, 2022) Brussels Cycling Classic (2017, 2023) GP de Denain (2013, 2017) London–Surrey Classic (2013) Milano–Torino (2020)
Medal record
Men's road bicycle racing
Representing France
World Championships
Gold medal – first place	2011 Copenhagen	Under-23 road race
Silver medal – second place	2009 Moscow	Junior road race
European Championships
Silver medal – second place	2020 Plouay	Elite road race
Silver medal – second place	2022 Munich	Elite road race
Bronze medal – third place	2010 Ankara	Under-23 road race
Bronze medal – third place	2009 Hooglede-Gits	Junior road race

Arnaud Démare (born 26 August 1991) is a French former professional road racing cyclist.

Having turned professional in 2012 and specialising as a sprinter, Démare has taken almost 100 wins as a professional, including 10 Grand Tour stage victories – 2 at the Tour de France and 8 at the Giro d'Italia (the most by any French rider) – and he won the points classification in the Giro d'Italia in 2020 and 2022. Démare is one of five riders to have won the French National Road Race Championships three times, having won the race in 2014, 2017 and 2020. He has also won the under-23 road race at the 2011 UCI Road World Championships, and the 2016 Milan–San Remo, a cycling monument.

== Career ==
=== Junior and amateur career ===
Born in Beauvais, Démare joined Team Wasquehal in 2008, and as a first-year junior rider, he won a stage at both the Tour de l'Abitibi and the Coupe des Nations Abitibi. During his second junior season in 2009, Démare won the bronze medal in the road race at the UEC European Road Championships in Belgium, and the silver medal in the road race at the UCI Junior World Championships in Russia. He also won a stage of the Tour d'Istrie in Croatia, and placed second to Guillaume Van Keirsbulck in the Paris–Roubaix Juniors.

Ageing out of juniors, Démare signed with CC Nogent-sur-Oise for the 2010 season. He won the final stage of the Coupe des nations Ville Saguenay in Canada, before winning a bronze medal at the UEC European Road Championships for the second year in a row – this time at under-23 level. Following this, he won the Grand Prix de la ville de Pérenchies in a sprint finish, and later finished fifth in the under-23 road race at the UCI Road World Championships in Australia. Having won La Côte Picarde in the spring of 2011, Démare won two stages at the Coupe des nations Ville Saguenay, before winning the Ronde Pévéloise one-day race and a stage of the Tour Alsace. These performances earned him a stagiaire role at FDJ to the end of the 2011 season, and during this time, Démare won the under-23 road race at the UCI Road World Championships in Denmark – leading home teammate Adrien Petit in the sprint finish, for a second French win in three years.

=== FDJ–BigMat (2012–2023) ===
In the days after his stagiaire role with FDJ was announced, Démare was further announced to be joining the team full-time for the 2012 season.

==== 2012–2013 ====
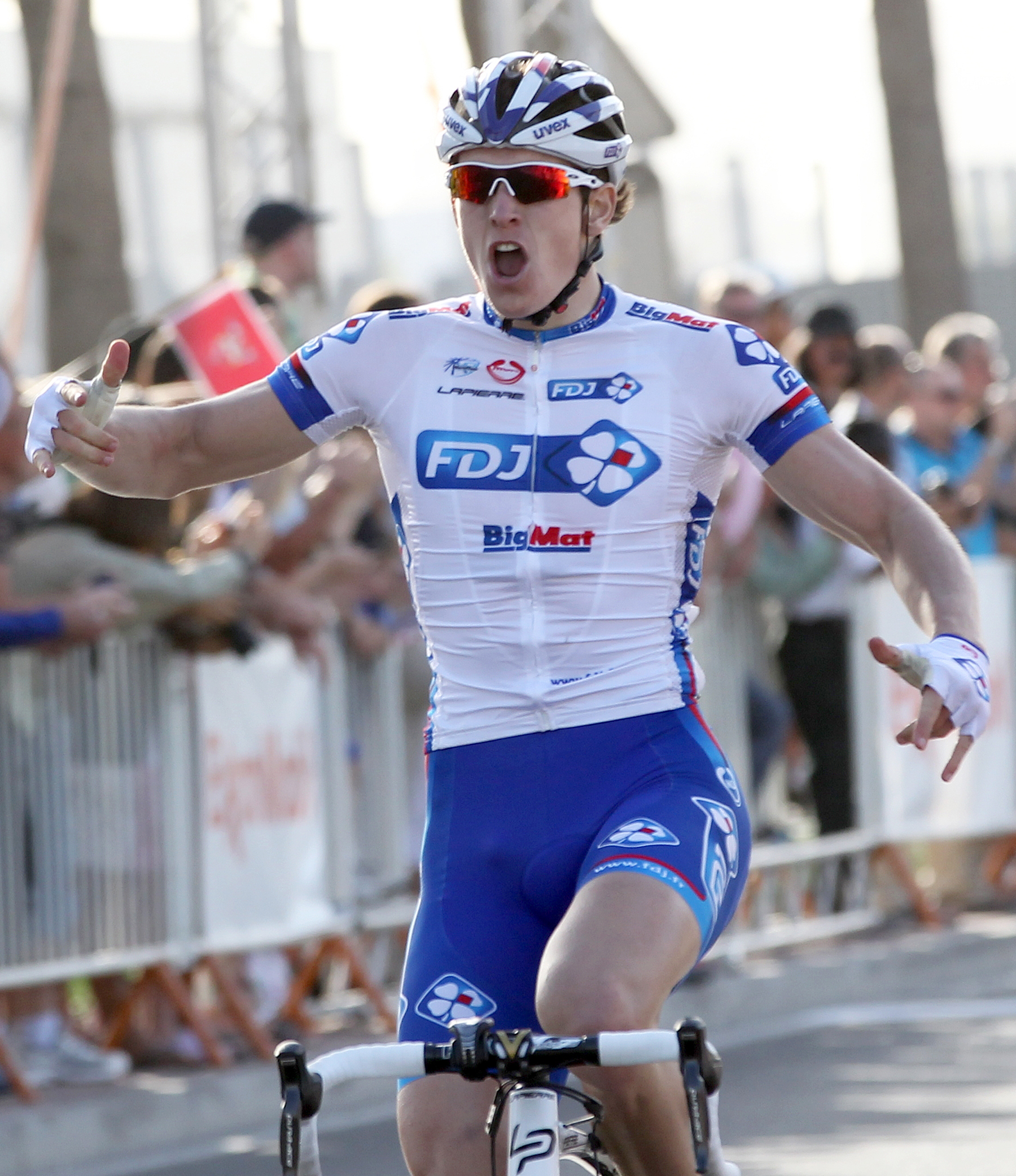
Démare celebrating victory on the final stage of the 2012 Tour of Qatar

Démare took his first professional victory in his first start of the 2012 season, when he won the final stage of February's Tour of Qatar. At the end of the month, Démare followed this up with a fourth-place finish in Kuurne–Brussels–Kuurne, before winning Le Samyn in a sprint finish from a small group. In March, Démare won the final stage and the points classification at the Driedaagse van West-Vlaanderen, before winning the Cholet-Pays de Loire in a sprint finish. After further fourth-place finishes at the Grand Prix de Denain and Tro-Bro Léon one-day races, Démare made his Grand Tour début at the Giro d'Italia, recording a best stage finish of fourth before abandoning ahead of the final week. Following the Giro d'Italia, Démare won the second stage of the Route du Sud, and then finished second to teammate Nacer Bouhanni in both Halle–Ingooigem and the French National Road Race Championships. He was part of the French squad that contested the road race at the London Olympics, finishing in 30th place. In August, Démare won his first UCI World Tour race, winning the sprint finish at the Vattenfall Cyclassics, ahead of local favourite André Greipel and Giacomo Nizzolo.

Having held the lead of the Three Days of De Panne for a day, Démare's first victory of the 2013 season came at April's Grand Prix de Denain, winning the sprint ahead of Bryan Coquard and Bouhanni. He then won the first three stages of the Four Days of Dunkirk, ultimately winning the race overall as well as the points and young rider classifications. In June, he took his first stage victory at a UCI World Tour stage race, winning the bunch sprint at the end of the fourth stage of the Tour de Suisse into Buochs. Aside from another World Tour stage victory at the Eneco Tour, Démare's remaining successes during the year came in one-day races – he won the RideLondon–Surrey Classic in August, and the Grand Prix d'Isbergues in September to take his tally to ten wins for the season, while also finishing on the podium at Paris–Bourges (second) and Paris–Tours (third).

==== 2014 ====
For the second time in three years, Démare won on the Doha Corniche with a final-stage victory at the Tour of Qatar, his first race of the season. Moving into the cobbled classics, Démare finished in the front group at Gent–Wevelgem, ultimately finishing second behind John Degenkolb – a result that left him "satisfied" prior to the Tour of Flanders and Paris–Roubaix, but only finished the latter in twelfth place. Having extended his contract with the team until the end of the 2016 season, Démare repeated his overall victory at May's Four Days of Dunkirk, where he also won the first two stages, points and young rider classifications. The following week, he won the last two stages of the Tour de Picardie to take the overall victory, and he also won the points classification at the race. With seven victories to that point in the year, Démare was selected by FDJ.fr as their main sprinter for the Tour de France for the first time, being selected over teammate Nacer Bouhanni.

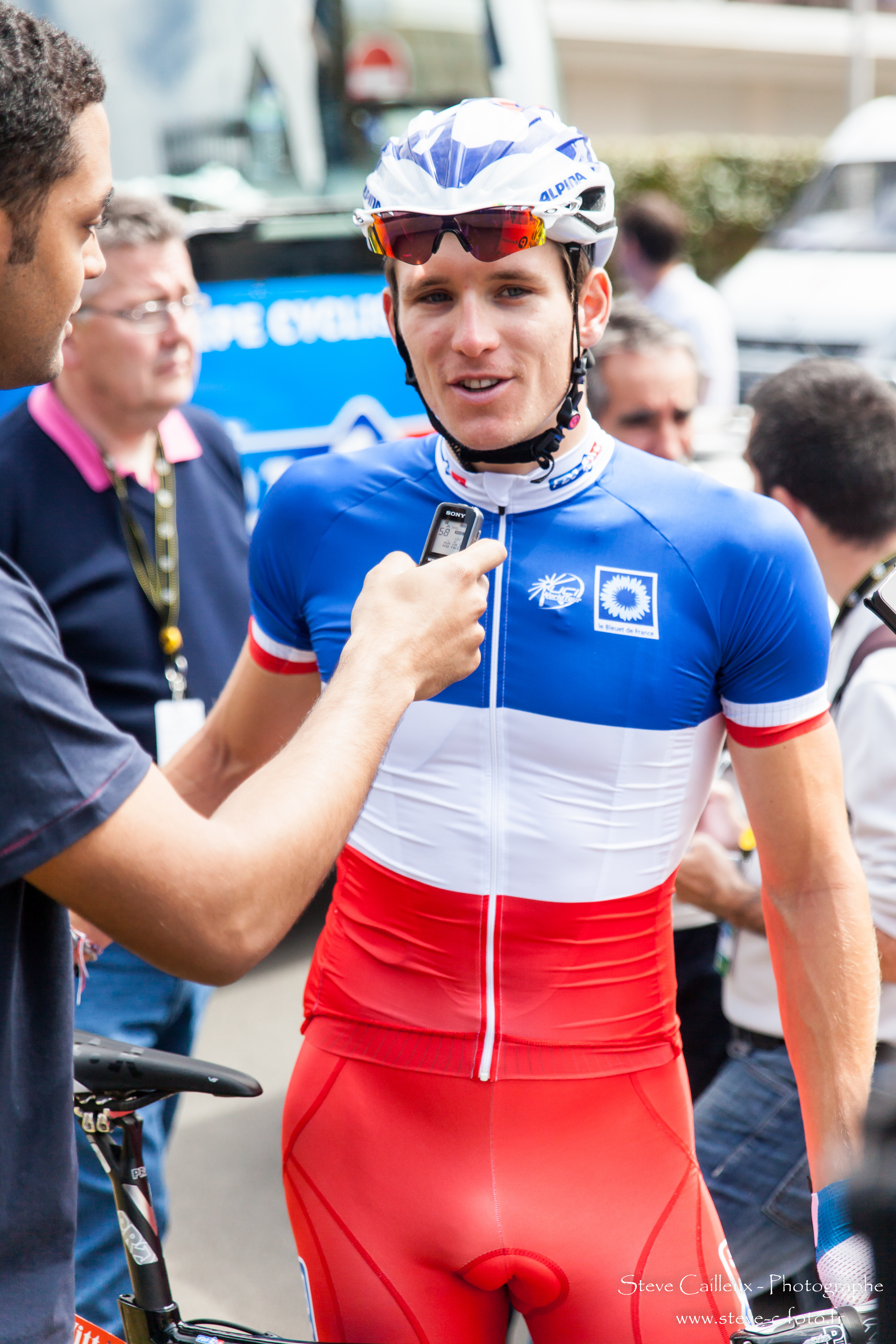
Démare at the 2014 Tour de France, where he wore the French national road race champion's jersey for the first time

Ahead of the Tour de France, Démare took successive victories in Halle–Ingooigem and the French National Road Race Championships – finishing directly ahead of Bouhanni in the latter. Démare's best stage results at the Tour de France were a pair of third-place finishes, on stages four and twelve. Over the remainder of the 2014 campaign, Démare took a further six victories – for a final tally of fifteen wins. He won the Kampioenschap van Vlaanderen and Grand Prix d'Isbergues one-day races in September in bunch sprints, before he won the Tour de l'Eurométropole stage race the following month, along with three stages, points and young rider classifications.

==== 2015 ====
In contrast to his 2014 season, Démare went winless through the first few months of 2015, recording a tenth-place finish in the cobbled classics opener Omloop Het Nieuwsblad, and a best result of any kind being a second place on the second stage of Paris–Nice. Démare's first wins of the season came at May's Tour of Belgium; having finished second to Tom Boonen on the first road stage, Démare then out-sprinted Boonen to win on the next two stages to move into second overall, one second off the lead. He ultimately failed to finish the final stage, losing the points classification as a result of this. These would ultimately be his only wins of the season, with a second-place stage finish at the Eneco Tour – to Boonen – being his best result for the remainder of the year.

==== 2016 ====
In January, Démare announced his race plans for the first half of the new season, starting his campaign on home soil at Étoile de Bessèges and La Méditerranéenne, followed by competing in the spring classics of Omloop Het Nieuwsblad, Kuurne–Brussels–Kuurne, Milan–San Remo, Gent–Wevelgem, the Tour of Flanders and Paris–Roubaix, along with the Paris–Nice and Three Days of De Panne stage races. He also announced that he would skip the Tour de France and focus on the Giro d'Italia instead. He enjoyed success at La Méditerranéenne, where his FDJ squad won the race's opening team time trial and he won the following stage. Démare went on to win the first full stage of Paris–Nice, his final preparatory race for Milan–San Remo.

At Milan–San Remo, Démare crashed on the Cipressa climb with around 30 kilometres (19 miles) remaining, but was able to rejoin the main field ahead of the Poggio di San Remo. He then won the final sprint to become the first French rider to win the race since Laurent Jalabert in 1995, and the first French rider to win a cycling monument since Jalabert's 1997 Giro di Lombardia victory. Démare's victory was however questioned by rival riders Matteo Tosatto and Eros Capecchi, who alleged that Démare had been assisted by a tow from an FDJ team car on the Cipressa. In the absence of any photographic or video evidence, race officials decided not to take any action. After a fifth-place finish at Gent–Wevelgem, Démare contested the Giro d'Italia for the first time since 2012, recording two second-place stage finishes, but ultimately withdrew from the race ahead of the final week. He won the final stage and the points classification at June's Route du Sud, but would not win another race until October, when he won Binche–Chimay–Binche in a two-up sprint against Zdeněk Štybar. He also recorded second-place finishes at the Brussels Cycling Classic and Paris–Tours, but ultimately finished the season with a tally of six wins.

==== 2017 ====
Démare won on his opening race day of the season, taking the first stage of Étoile de Bessèges in a sprint finish; he also won the fourth stage of the race in a similar fashion. He then won the opening stage of Paris–Nice in a sprint à deux against Julian Alaphilippe in Bois-d'Arcy, having followed Alaphilippe's attacking move with around 1.5 kilometres (0.93 miles) remaining. He held the race lead until the stage 4 individual time trial, losing it to Alaphilippe. He was unable to defend his title at Milan–San Remo, as he finished in sixth place – in a chase group behind a lead trio that had attacked on the Poggio di San Remo. He also finished in sixth place at Paris–Roubaix, his first top-ten placing at the race, leading home the first chase group behind the five riders that competed for the race honours. In the lead up to the Tour de France, Démare took a further five victories – he won the Grand Prix de Denain and Halle–Ingooigem one-day races, a stage at both the Four Days of Dunkirk and Critérium du Dauphiné stage races, and a second French National Road Race Championships title in Saint-Omer, beating former teammate Nacer Bouhanni to the win.

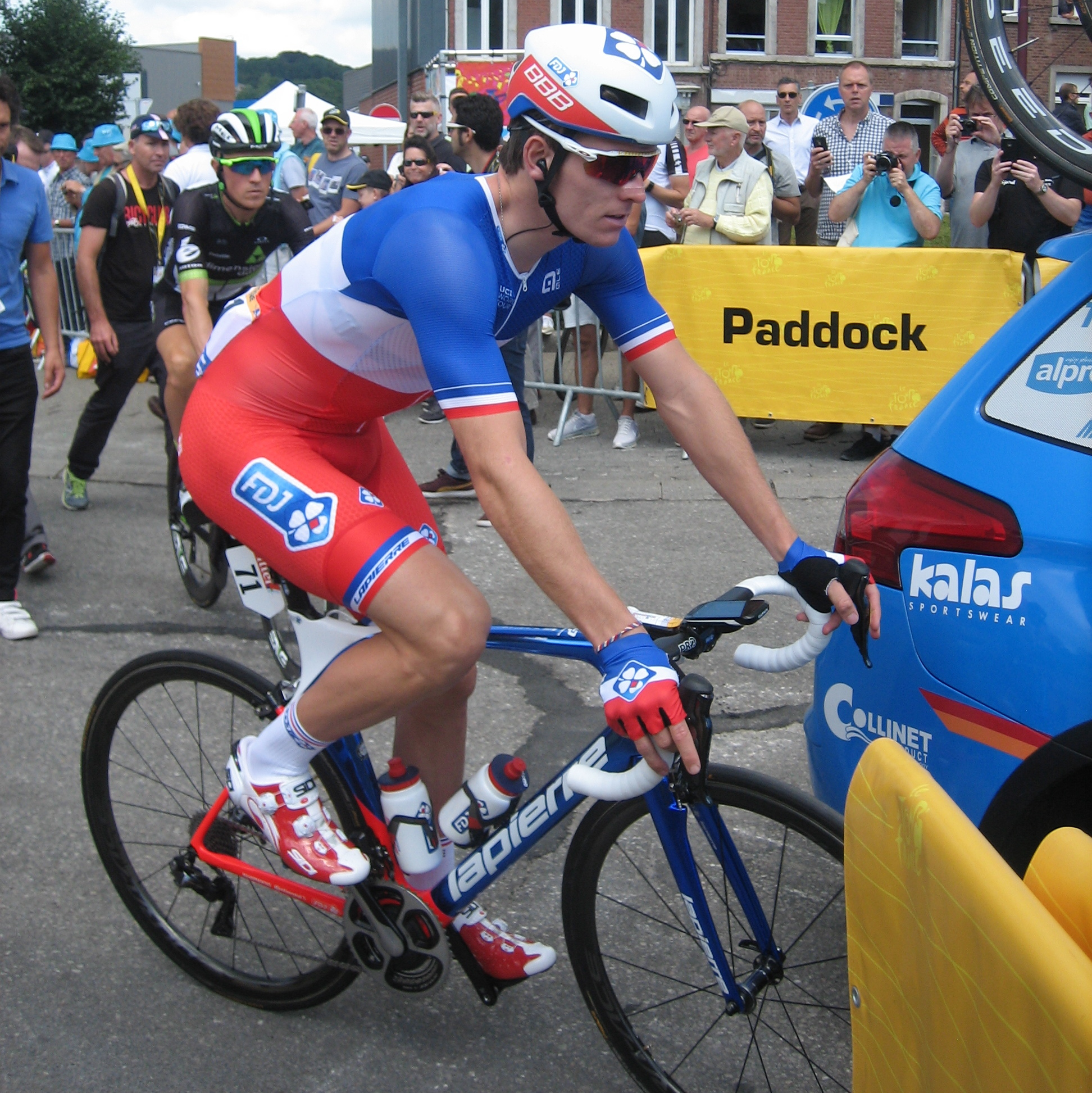
Démare wearing the French national road race champion's jersey at the 2017 Tour de France. He won the fourth stage, his first win at a Grand Tour.

Having finished second to Marcel Kittel on the second stage of the Tour de France, Démare took his first Grand Tour stage win on the fourth stage in a sprint finish in Vittel; it was the first Tour de France stage won by a Frenchman in a bunch sprint since Jimmy Casper did so in Strasbourg in 2006. Wearing the green jersey of points classification leader, Démare was also edged out by Kittel on the sixth stage into Troyes, before falling ill ahead of the stages in the Jura Mountains. On stage 8, he finished more than 37 minutes behind the stage winner, before finishing outside the time limit the following day – along with three of his teammates – eliminating them from the race. Following the Tour de France, Démare finished second to Elia Viviani at the EuroEyes Cyclassics in Hamburg, before winning the Brussels Cycling Classic in a sprint finish.

==== 2018–2019 ====
After finishing second to Dylan Groenewegen at Kuurne–Brussels–Kuurne, Démare took his first victory of the 2018 season with an opening stage win at Paris–Nice. He took third-place finishes on consecutive March weekends at Milan–San Remo and Gent–Wevelgem, but it was not until June before he took another victory, winning the penultimate stage of the Tour de Suisse. At the Tour de France, he was third on the second and thirteenth stages, before he took his second Tour de France stage win, on stage eighteen into Pau, following a lead-out from teammate Jacopo Guarnieri. With a further third-place finish on the final stage, Démare finished third in the points classification. Having also extended his contract with Groupama–FDJ until the end of 2020, Démare was second at the EuroEyes Cyclassics, before he completed a clean sweep at the Tour Poitou-Charentes en Nouvelle-Aquitaine, winning all five stages on his way to the overall victory. He took one other podium result before the end of the year, finishing second to Pascal Ackermann at the Grand Prix de Fourmies.

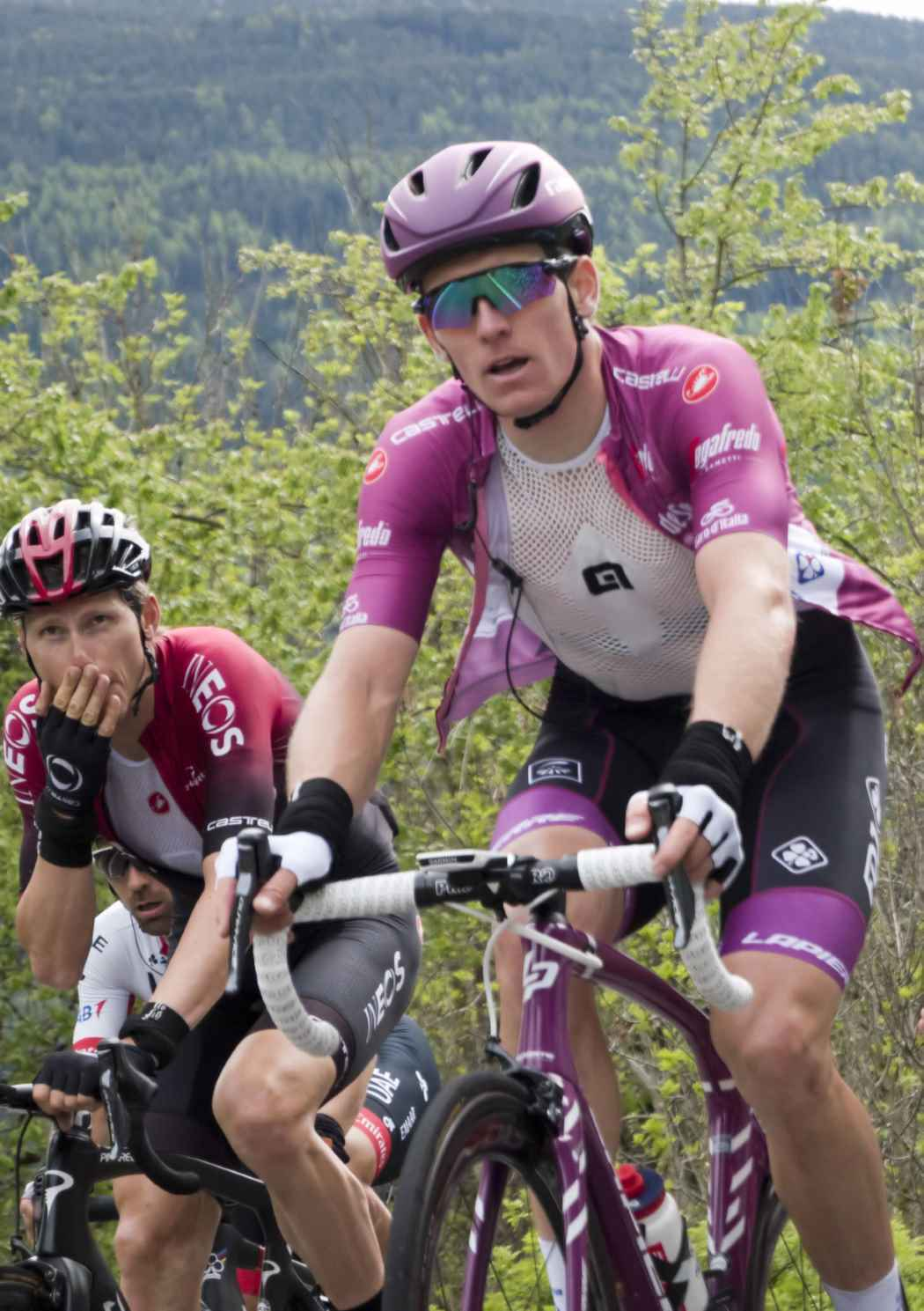
Démare (right) at the 2019 Giro d'Italia. He won a stage, and wore the maglia ciclamino (English: cyclamen jersey) of points classification leader for seven days during the race.

After second-place stage finishes at both the Volta ao Algarve and Paris–Nice, Démare's first victory of the 2019 season came during the tenth stage of the Giro d'Italia – which ended on the streets of Modena – prevailing in a bunch sprint ahead of Elia Viviani. He took the lead of the points classification the following day, which he held for seven stages, but ultimately finished second to Pascal Ackermann – a rider he had criticised following his Modena stage victory. He then won two stages and the points classification at the Route d'Occitanie, and also won a stage at the Tour de Wallonie. Démare's final win of the season came at September's Okolo Slovenska, where he won the penultimate stage and the points classification; he also finished second overall in the general classification, one second in arrears of the race winner, Yves Lampaert.

==== 2020 ====
After competing at the UAE Tour prior to the COVID-19 pandemic-enforced suspension of racing, Démare's first win of 2020 came at Milano–Torino, which was held on a flatter parcours compared to previous years, as it was held as a midweek precursor to Milan–San Remo three days later. Over the rest of August, Démare took eight further victories – two stage wins and the general classification at the Tour de Wallonie, the French National Road Race Championships (becoming the fifth rider to win the race at least three times), and three stage wins and the general classification at the Tour Poitou-Charentes en Nouvelle-Aquitaine, overhauling Josef Černý on the final day in the latter. He also won a silver medal in the road race at the UEC European Road Championships, held in Plouay, France, just behind Italy's Giacomo Nizzolo.

After a stage win in September's Tour de Luxembourg, Démare returned to the Giro d'Italia in October, as one of the contenders for the points classification jersey. Démare won his first stage of the race on stage four, winning a bunch sprint into Villafranca Tirrena. Démare then won the next two bunch sprints on stages six and seven into Matera and Brindisi respectively, taking and solidifying his lead in the points classification, and as a result, becoming the first rider since Robbie McEwen in 2006 to win three stages in the opening week of the Giro d'Italia. He added a fourth stage victory on stage eleven into Rimini, again in a bunch sprint, and ultimately held the points classification lead until the finish in Milan; he finished 49 points ahead of his closest challenger, Peter Sagan. Démare finished the 2020 season with fourteen victories, two more than any other rider, while also extending his contract with Groupama–FDJ until the end of 2023.

==== 2021 ====
Following second-place stage finishes at the Tour de la Provence and Paris–Nice, Démare took his first win of the season in April at La Roue Tourangelle, a one-day race, beating Nacer Bouhanni in a sprint finish. He then won two stages and the points classification in the Volta a la Comunitat Valenciana, and in May, won the last three stages of the Boucles de la Mayenne on his way to winning the general and points classifications at the race. He won the second stage of the Route d'Occitanie, before competing in the Tour de France for the first time since 2018. Démare recorded a single top-ten stage finish (fourth) on stage six, and finished outside of the time limit three stages later, ending his race early. He made his first start at the Vuelta a España, looking to complete the triptych of winning a stage at all three Grand Tours. The closest he came was a second-place finish to Fabio Jakobsen on the fourth stage, and he finished inside the top-100 of a Grand Tour general classification for the first time. He finished the season with a second-place finish at Paris–Bourges, and victory in Paris–Tours, winning out of a four-rider group that had broken clear towards the end of the race. He became the first French rider to win the race for fifteen years.

==== 2022 ====
In the first third of the season, Démare's best result was a second-place stage finish at Tirreno–Adriatico, and he also recorded his fourth top-ten finish at Milan–San Remo, finishing tenth. At the Giro d'Italia, and having missed out on victory on stage three to Mark Cavendish, Démare won stages five and six to move into the lead of the points classification; as a result, he surpassed Jacques Anquetil and Bernard Hinault for most stage wins by a Frenchman at the Giro d'Italia, with seven. He added a third stage victory of the race on the thirteenth stage, as he ultimately won the points classification for the second time – scoring almost double the points of runner-up Fernando Gaviria. Following the Giro d'Italia, Démare took stage victories at both the Route d'Occitanie and the Tour de Pologne, also winning the points classification of the latter.

Démare was seen to be one of the favourites for the road race at the UEC European Road Championships in Germany, leading the French team at the race. He ultimately won the silver medal, as he was unable to out-sprint Fabio Jakobsen in the closing metres in Munich. The week after, Démare took second-place finishes on consecutive days at the Belgian one-day races Egmont Cycling Race and Druivenkoers Overijse. Following another second-place finish in Belgium, at the Primus Classic, Démare finished his season with a block of racing in France, commencing with a sprint victory at the Grand Prix d'Isbergues. He finished in second place in bunch sprints at the Tour de Vendée and Paris–Bourges, before concluding his season with a second successive victory in Paris–Tours – the first rider to do so since Philippe Gilbert in 2008 and 2009.

==== 2023 ====
Démare did not record any top-three results until May, when he won the second stage of the Boucles de la Mayenne; he went on to finish the race second overall behind Oier Lazkano, but won the points classification. He followed this up with a second victory at the Brussels Cycling Classic, having been part of a group of some twenty riders that formed on the combination of the Muur van Geraardsbergen and Bosberg climbs with around 50 kilometres (31 miles) remaining. Despite these victories, Démare was not selected for the Tour de France for the second year in succession, and was told by Groupama–FDJ team manager Marc Madiot that his contract would not be extended beyond the end of the season.

=== Arkéa–Samsic (2023–present) ===
Démare and Groupama–FDJ agreed to a mutual termination of his contract as at the end of July 2023 and joined Arkéa–Samsic – another UCI WorldTeam – until the end of the 2025 season. He made his first start with the team at the Tour of Leuven in mid-August, He finished fourth at the Hamburg Cyclassics, before recording his first podium result with the team, finishing third at the Grand Prix d'Isbergues. He took two victories towards the end of the season, winning the Tour de Vendée and Paris–Bourges races in group sprints. In 2024, Démare had his least prolific season since 2015, taking two individual victories – a stage at the Tour Poitou-Charentes en Nouvelle-Aquitaine (also winning the points classification), and a one-day victory at Paris–Chauny.

On 9 October 2025, Démare announced his retirement from professional cycling effective following the Paris–Tours race on 12 October.

== Personal life ==
Démare is married to Morgane, and the couple have one daughter.

== Major results ==
2008
Tour de l'Abitibi

1st Points classification
1st Stage 1

1st Stage 4 Coupe des Nations Abitibi
9th Bernaudeau Junior
2009
2nd Road race, UCI Junior World Championships
2nd Paris–Roubaix Juniors
3rd Road race, UEC European Junior Road Championships
3rd Overall Tour d'Istrie

1st Stage 3

3rd Bernaudeau Junior
6th Overall GP Général Patton
9th Overall Tour De Lorraine Juniors
2010
1st Grand Prix de la ville de Pérenchies
1st Stage 4 Coupe des nations Ville Saguenay
5th Road race, UCI Under-23 Road World Championships
8th La Côte Picarde
9th Paris–Tours Espoirs
10th ZLM Tour
10th Grand Prix de la Ville de Lillers
2011
1st Road race, UCI Under-23 Road World Championships
1st La Côte Picarde
1st Ronde Pévéloise
Coupe des nations Ville Saguenay

1st Stages 1 & 4

1st Stage 3 Tour Alsace
4th Paris–Roubaix Espoirs
4th ZLM Tour
2012 (6 pro wins)
1st Vattenfall Cyclassics
1st Le Samyn
1st Cholet-Pays de Loire
1st Stage 6 Tour of Qatar
1st Stage 2 Route du Sud
2nd Road race, National Road Championships
2nd Halle–Ingooigem
4th Kuurne–Brussels–Kuurne
4th Tro-Bro Léon
4th GP de Denain Porte du Hainaut
9th Overall Driedaagse van West-Vlaanderen

1st Points classification
1st Stage 2

2013 (9)
1st Overall Four Days of Dunkirk

1st Points classification
1st Young rider classification
1st Stages 1, 2 & 3

1st Grand Prix de Denain
1st RideLondon–Surrey Classic
1st Grand Prix d'Isbergues
1st Grote Prijs Beeckman-De Caluwé
1st Stage 4 Tour de Suisse
1st Stage 2 Eneco Tour
2nd Paris–Bourges
3rd Paris–Tours
9th Overall Tour de l'Eurométropole
9th Omloop van het Houtland
10th Vattenfall Cyclassics
2014 (15)
1st Road race, National Road Championships
1st Overall Four Days of Dunkirk

1st Points classification
1st Young rider classification
1st Stages 1 & 2

1st Overall Tour de l'Eurométropole

1st Points classification
1st Young rider classification
1st Stages 1, 2 & 4

1st Overall Tour de Picardie

1st Points classification
1st Stages 2 & 3

1st Halle–Ingooigem
1st Kampioenschap van Vlaanderen
1st Grand Prix d'Isbergues
1st Stage 6 Tour of Qatar
2nd Gent–Wevelgem
3rd Brussels Cycling Classic
10th Omloop Het Nieuwsblad
2015 (2)
Tour of Belgium

1st Stages 2 & 3

4th Paris–Bourges
4th Tour de Vendée
6th Vattenfall Cyclassics
10th Omloop Het Nieuwsblad
2016 (5)
1st Milan–San Remo
1st Binche–Chimay–Binche
La Méditerranéenne

1st Stages 1 (TTT) & 2

1st Stage 1 Paris–Nice
Route du Sud

1st Points classification
1st Stage 5

2nd Paris–Tours
2nd Brussels Cycling Classic
5th Gent–Wevelgem
6th Grand Prix de Fourmies
8th Halle–Ingooigem
2017 (10)
1st Road race, National Road Championships
1st Brussels Cycling Classic
1st Grand Prix de Denain
1st Halle–Ingooigem
Tour de France

1st Stage 4
Held after Stages 4–6

Critérium du Dauphiné

1st Points classification
1st Stage 2

Étoile de Bessèges

1st Stages 1 & 4

1st Stage 1 Paris–Nice
1st Stage 2 Four Days of Dunkirk
2nd EuroEyes Cyclassics
6th Kuurne–Brussels–Kuurne
6th Milan–San Remo
6th Paris–Roubaix
7th Tro-Bro Léon
2018 (9)
1st Overall Tour Poitou-Charentes en Nouvelle-Aquitaine

1st Points classification
1st Stages 1, 2, 3, 4 (ITT) & 5

1st Stage 18 Tour de France
1st Stage 1 Paris–Nice
1st Stage 8 Tour de Suisse
2nd EuroEyes Cyclassics
2nd Kuurne–Brussels–Kuurne
2nd Grand Prix de Fourmies
3rd Milan–San Remo
3rd Gent–Wevelgem
9th Omloop Het Nieuwsblad
2019 (5)
Giro d'Italia

1st Stage 10
Held after Stages 11–17

Route d'Occitanie

1st Points classification
1st Stages 2 & 4

1st Stage 4 Tour de Wallonie
2nd Overall Okolo Slovenska

1st Points classification
1st Stage 3

4th Paris–Tours
6th Brussels Cycling Classic
6th Paris–Chauny
8th EuroEyes Cyclassics
9th Road race, UEC European Road Championships
2020 (14)
1st Road race, National Road Championships
1st Overall Tour Poitou-Charentes en Nouvelle-Aquitaine

1st Points classification
1st Stages 1, 2 & 5

1st Overall Tour de Wallonie

1st Points classification
1st Stages 2 & 4

1st Milano–Torino
Giro d'Italia

1st Points classification
1st Stages 4, 6, 7 & 11

1st Stage 2 Tour de Luxembourg
2nd Road race, UEC European Road Championships
5th Paris–Chauny
2021 (9)
1st Overall Boucles de la Mayenne

1st Points classification
1st Stages 2, 3 & 4

1st Paris–Tours
1st La Roue Tourangelle
Volta a la Comunitat Valenciana

1st Points classification
1st Stages 2 & 5

1st Stage 2 Route d'Occitanie
2nd Paris–Bourges
5th Grand Prix d'Isbergues
6th Grand Prix de Denain
2022 (7)
1st Paris–Tours
1st Grand Prix d'Isbergues
Giro d'Italia

1st Points classification
1st Stages 5, 6 & 13

Tour de Pologne

1st Points classification
1st Stage 7

1st Stage 1 Route d'Occitanie
2nd Road race, UEC European Road Championships
2nd Primus Classic
2nd Egmont Cycling Race
2nd Druivenkoers Overijse
2nd Tour de Vendée
2nd Paris–Bourges
6th Classic Brugge–De Panne
7th Paris–Chauny
10th Milan–San Remo
10th Gent–Wevelgem
2023 (4)
1st Brussels Cycling Classic
1st Paris–Bourges
1st Tour de Vendée
2nd Overall Boucles de la Mayenne

1st Points classification
1st Stage 2

3rd Grand Prix d'Isbergues
4th Hamburg Cyclassics
7th Grand Prix de Fourmies
8th Paris–Tours
2024 (2)
1st Paris–Chauny
Tour Poitou-Charentes en Nouvelle-Aquitaine

1st Points classification
1st Stage 4

5th Trofeo Palma
10th Tour of Leuven
2025
4th Copenhagen Sprint
4th Classique Dunkerque

=== Grand Tour general classification results timeline ===
Grand Tour	2012	2013	2014	2015	2016	2017	2018	2019	2020	2021	2022	2023	2024
Giro d'Italia	DNF	—	—	—	DNF	—	—	123	121	—	130	—	—
Tour de France	—	—	159	138	—	DNF	141	—	—	DNF	—	—	DNF
Vuelta a España	—	—	—	—	—	—	—	—	—	96	—	—	—

=== Classics results timeline ===
Monument	2011	2012	2013	2014	2015	2016	2017	2018	2019	2020	2021	2022	2023	2024
Milan–San Remo	—	—	129	34	127	1	6	3	32	24	26	10	51	43
Tour of Flanders	—	—	24	DNF	23	DNF	56	15	28	—	—	—	—	—
Paris–Roubaix	—	—	90	12	37	—	6	61	17	NH	34	—	—	—
Liège–Bastogne–Liège	Has not contested during career													
Giro di Lombardia	Has not contested during career													
Classic	2011	2012	2013	2014	2015	2016	2017	2018	2019	2020	2021	2022	2023	2024
Omloop Het Nieuwsblad	—	—	—	10	10	82	20	9	—	—	—	—	—	—
Kuurne–Brussels–Kuurne	—	4	NH	22	—	11	6	2	—	—	37	—	—	44
Milano–Torino	—	—	—	—	—	—	—	—	—	1	—	—	—	17
E3 Saxo Bank Classic	—	—	—	—	—	101	—	56	34	NH	—	—	—	—
Gent–Wevelgem	—	143	12	2	15	5	78	3	67	—	44	10	79	60
Hamburg Cyclassics	—	1	10	45	6	34	2	2	8	Not held		DNF	4	12
Brussels Cycling Classic	70	12	—	3	99	2	1	75	6	—	—	—	1	—
Paris–Tours	—	—	3	42	12	2	—	14	4	—	1	1	8	52

=== Major championships timeline ===
Event		2012	2013	2014	2015	2016	2017	2018	2019	2020	2021	2022	2023	2024
Olympic Games	Road race	30	Not held			—	Not held				—	Not held		—
World Championships	Road race	—	—	—	38	DNF	—	—	—	—	56	—	—	—
European Championships	Road race	Race did not exist				—	—	—	9	2	—	2	73	11
National Championships	Road race	2	20	1	50	DNF	1	14	11	1	DNF	6	—	62

Legend
—	Did not compete
DNF	Did not finish
DNS	Did not start
OTL	Outside time limit
NH	Not held
