= 2020 Milano–Torino =

101st edition of the Milano–Torino cycling classic

2020 UCI Europe Tour 2020 UCI ProSeries

Race details
- Dates: 5 August 2020
- Distance: 198 km (123.0 mi)
- Winning time: 4h 18' 57"

Results
	Winner	Arnaud Démare (FRA)	(Groupama–FDJ)
	Second	Caleb Ewan (AUS)	(Lotto–Soudal)
	Third	Wout van Aert (BEL)	(Team Jumbo–Visma)

The 2020 Milano–Torino was the 101st edition of the Milano–Torino cycling classic. It was held on 5 August 2020 and was rated as a 1.Pro event on the 2020 UCI Europe Tour and 2020 UCI ProSeries. Unlike previous editions of the race, which were more suited for climbers and puncheurs, this year's edition was mostly flat and favored the sprinters. The race, which started in Mesero and finished in Stupinigi, was won by French rider Arnaud Démare of Groupama–FDJ.

== Teams ==
Fourteen UCI WorldTeams, seven UCI ProTeams, and the Italian national team participated in the race. Seventeen teams entered the maximum of seven riders, while the other five teams, those being AG2R La Mondiale, Astana, Israel Start-Up Nation, Team Jumbo–Visma, and UAE Team Emirates, only entered six riders. Of the 149 riders that started the race, only three did not finish.

UCI WorldTeams

- AG2R La Mondiale
- Astana
- Bora–Hansgrohe
- CCC Team
- Deceuninck–Quick-Step
- Groupama–FDJ
- Israel Start-Up Nation
- Lotto–Soudal
- Mitchelton–Scott
- Movistar Team
- Team Ineos
- Team Jumbo–Visma
- Trek–Segafredo
- UAE Team Emirates

UCI ProTeams

- Arkéa–Samsic
- Alpecin–Fenix
- Androni Giocattoli–Sidermec
- Bardiani–CSF–Faizanè
- Circus–Wanty Gobert
- Gazprom–RusVelo
- Vini Zabù–KTM

National Teams

- Italy

== Results ==
Result
Rank	Rider	Team	Time
1	Arnaud Démare (FRA)	Groupama–FDJ	4h 18' 57"
2	Caleb Ewan (AUS)	Lotto–Soudal	+ 0"
3	Wout van Aert (BEL)	Team Jumbo–Visma	+ 0"
4	Peter Sagan (SVK)	Bora–Hansgrohe	+ 0"
5	Danny van Poppel (NED)	Circus–Wanty Gobert	+ 0"
6	Nacer Bouhanni (FRA)	Arkéa–Samsic	+ 0"
7	Fernando Gaviria (COL)	UAE Team Emirates	+ 0"
8	Manuel Belletti (ITA)	Androni Giocattoli–Sidermec	+ 0"
9	Dion Smith (NZL)	Mitchelton–Scott	+ 0"
10	Ben Swift (GBR)	Team Ineos	+ 0"
