= Érezée =

Municipality in Wallonia, Belgium

Érezée Erezêye (Walloon)
- Municipality
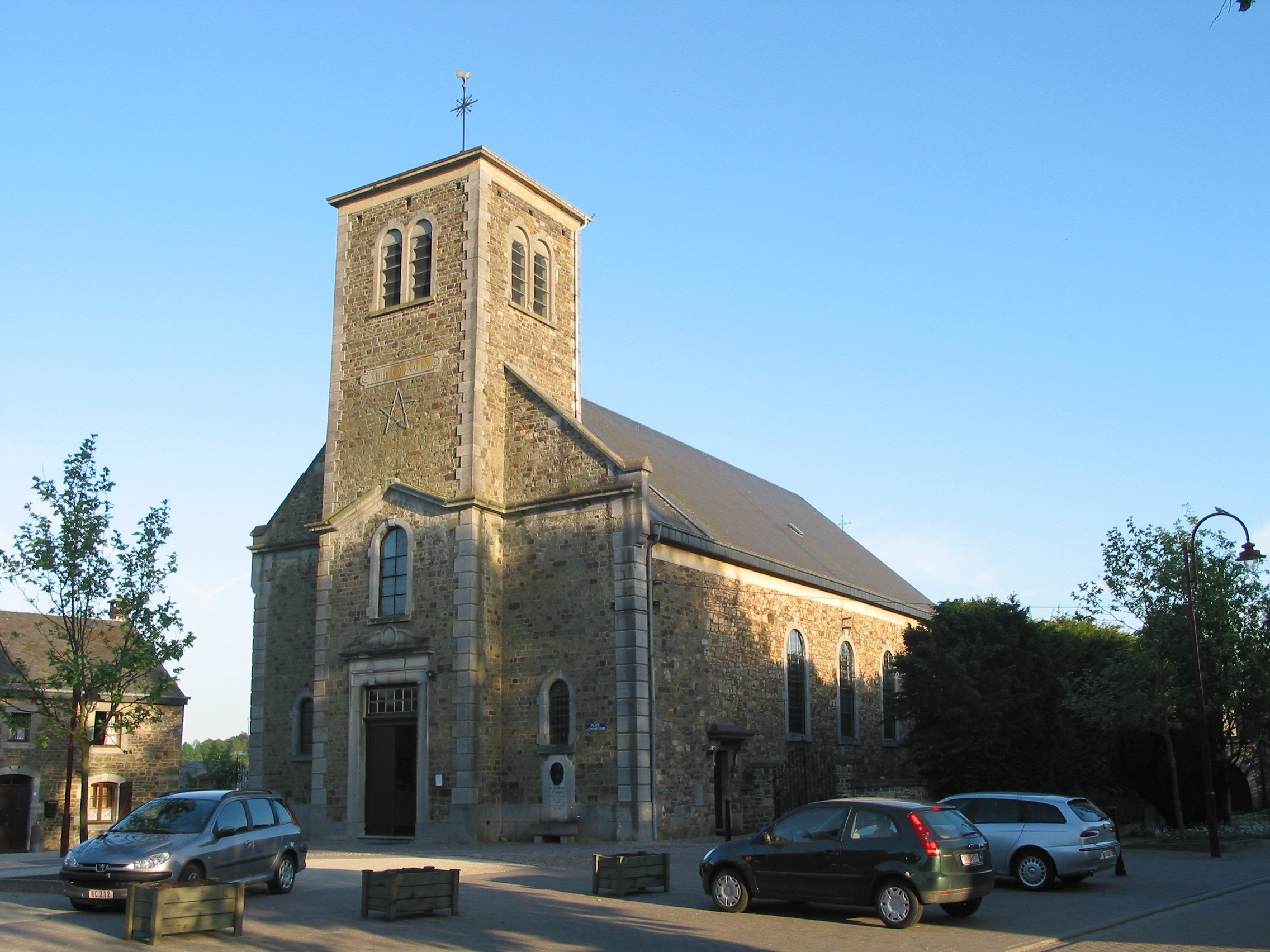

- Flag Coat of arms

- Location of Érezée in Luxembourg province
- Interactive map of Érezée
- Location in Belgium
- Coordinates: 50°17.5′N 05°33.5′E
- Country: Belgium
- Community: French Community
- Region: Wallonia
- Province: Luxembourg
- Arrondissement: Marche-en-Famenne

Government
  - Mayor: Michel Jacquet
  - Governing party: IC

Area
  - Total: 78.89 km^{2} (30.46 sq mi)

Population (2018-01-01)
  - Total: 3,228
  - Density: 40.92/km^{2} (106.0/sq mi)
- Postal codes: 6997
- NIS code: 83013
- Area codes: 086
- Website: www.erezee.be

Érezée (French pronunciation: [eʁəze]; Walloon: Erezêye) is a municipality of Wallonia located in the province of Luxembourg, Belgium.

On 1 January 2007 the municipality, which covers 78.44 km^{2} (30.29 sq mi), had 2,968 inhabitants, a population density of 37.8/km^{2} (98/sq mi).

The municipality consists of the following districts: Amonines, Érezée, Mormont, and Soy. Other localities are Clerheid and Fisenne.

== Attractions ==
- Tramway Touristique de l'Aisne

== See also ==
- List of protected heritage sites in Érezée
