= 2012 Grand Prix de Denain =

Race details
- Dates: 12 April 2012
- Stages: 1
- Distance: 199.1 km (123.7 mi)
- Winning time: 4h 38' 13"

Results
	Winner	Juan José Haedo (ARG)
	Second	Alex Rasmussen (DEN)
	Third	Andrea Guardini (ITA)

The 2012 Grand Prix de Denain was the 54th edition of the Grand Prix de Denain cycle race and was held on 12 April 2012. The race started and finished in Denain. The race was won by Juan José Haedo.

== General classification ==
Final general classification

Rank	Rider	Time
1	Juan José Haedo (ARG)	4h 38' 13"
2	Alex Rasmussen (DEN)	+ 0"
3	Andrea Guardini (ITA)	+ 0"
4	Fabien Bacquet (FRA)	+ 0"
5	Arnaud Démare (FRA)	+ 0"
6	Guillaume Boivin (CAN)	+ 0"
7	Kenny van Hummel (NED)	+ 0"
8	Denis Flahaut (FRA)	+ 0"
9	Matteo Pelucchi (ITA)	+ 0"
10	Jimmy Casper (FRA)	+ 0"
