= 2011 Grand Prix de Denain =

Race details
- Dates: 14 April 2011
- Stages: 1
- Distance: 199 km (123.7 mi)
- Winning time: 4h 32' 10"

Results
	Winner	Jimmy Casper (FRA)
	Second	Romain Feillu (FRA)
	Third	Aidis Kruopis (LTU)

The 2011 Grand Prix de Denain was the 53rd edition of the Grand Prix de Denain cycle race and was held on 14 April 2011. The race started and finished in Denain. The race was won by Jimmy Casper.

== General classification ==
Final general classification

Rank	Rider	Time
1	Jimmy Casper (FRA)	4h 32' 10"
2	Romain Feillu (FRA)	+ 0"
3	Aidis Kruopis (LTU)	+ 0"
4	Leigh Howard (AUS)	+ 0"
5	Denis Flahaut (FRA)	+ 0"
6	Danilo Napolitano (ITA)	+ 0"
7	Robert Hunter (RSA)	+ 0"
8	Nacer Bouhanni (FRA)	+ 0"
9	Fabien Bacquet (FRA)	+ 0"
10	Michael Van Staeyen (BEL)	+ 0"
