= 2009 Grand Prix de Denain =

Race details
- Dates: 16 April 2009
- Stages: 1
- Distance: 202.7 km (126.0 mi)
- Winning time: 4h 40' 18"

Results
	Winner	Jimmy Casper (FRA)
	Second	Matthew Goss (AUS)
	Third	Denis Flahaut (FRA)

The 2009 Grand Prix de Denain was the 51st edition of the Grand Prix de Denain cycle race and was held on 16 April 2009. The race started in Raismes and finished in Denain. The race was won by Jimmy Casper.

== General classification ==
Final general classification

Rank	Rider	Time
1	Jimmy Casper (FRA)	4h 40' 18"
2	Matthew Goss (AUS)	+ 0"
3	Denis Flahaut (FRA)	+ 0"
4	Roberto Ferrari (ITA)	+ 0"
5	Stéphane Bonsergent (FRA)	+ 0"
6	Kenny Dehaes (BEL)	+ 0"
7	Fabien Bacquet (FRA)	+ 0"
8	Mark Renshaw (AUS)	+ 0"
9	Yoann Offredo (FRA)	+ 0"
10	Yukiya Arashiro (JPN)	+ 0"
