= 2010 Grand Prix de Denain =

Race details
- Dates: 15 April 2010
- Stages: 1
- Distance: 197.1 km (122.5 mi)
- Winning time: 4h 30' 45"

Results
	Winner	Denis Flahaut (FRA)
	Second	Florian Vachon (FRA)
	Third	Enrico Rossi (ITA)

The 2010 Grand Prix de Denain was the 52nd edition of the Grand Prix de Denain cycle race and was held on 15 April 2010. The race started and finished in Denain. The race was won by Denis Flahaut.

== General classification ==
Final general classification

Rank	Rider	Time
1	Denis Flahaut (FRA)	4h 30' 45"
2	Florian Vachon (FRA)	+ 0"
3	Enrico Rossi (ITA)	+ 0"
4	Denis Galimzyanov (RUS)	+ 0"
5	Daniele Colli (ITA)	+ 0"
6	Sébastien Chavanel (FRA)	+ 0"
7	Yauheni Hutarovich (BLR)	+ 0"
8	Jimmy Casper (FRA)	+ 0"
9	Thomas Fothen (GER)	+ 0"
10	Kris Boeckmans (BEL)	+ 0"
