= Abillion =

Vegan lifestyle app

abillion
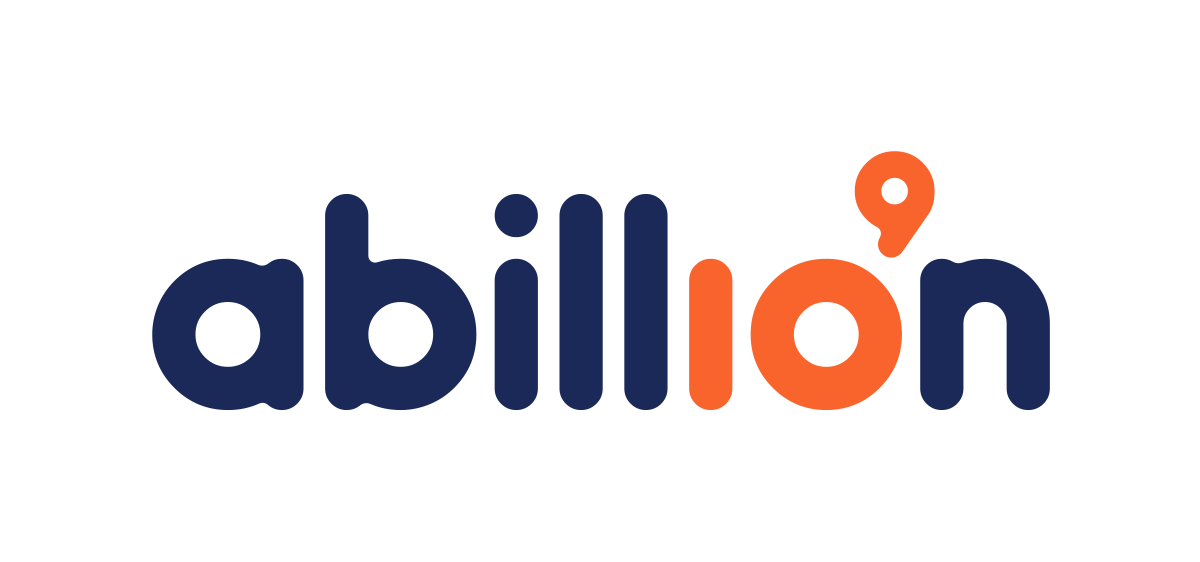
- Founded: May 2018; 8 years ago
- Founder: Vikas Garg.
- Defunct: March 2026; 7 months ago
- Type: Startup company
- Location: Singapore
- Region served: 183 countries
- Products: application; Social media; Web mapping; Restaurant rating; E-commerce
- Fields: Artificial intelligence; Advertising; Cloud computing; Computer software; Computer hardware; Internet
- Official language: English, Italian, Portuguese, Spanish, French
- Website: impact.abillion.com/about

abillion was a mobile application helping users to find vegan and sustainable products.

The platform allowed users to review plant-based, cruelty-free and sustainable products, while donating between 0.10 and $1 to nonprofit organisations for each review written. As of May 2023, the company claimed to have donated over $2.8M to various nonprofit organisations including Sea Shepherd and Mercy for Animals.

The main objective of the company was to reach the number of one billion people following a vegan diet and lifestyle by 2030.

== History ==
The American entrepreneur Vikas Garg founded the company in Singapore and the app was officially launched in May 2018.

The start-up was first named 'abillionveg' and changed its name in 2020 to shorten it to 'abillion'.

In 2019, the company raised $3M in its first round of funding (pre-Series A).

In 2021, it raised $10M in its Series A funding.

In February 2023, the company announced the launch of a community investment round, using the crowdfunding platform Wefunder, which reached a total of $500 000.

In May 2023, it celebrated its 5th anniversary and reaching 1M downloads.

In March 2026, the company announced that they would be closing down by the end of the month.

== Awards ==
Using data from the reviews published by its users, abillion was awarding the most liked vegan products and brands.

In May 2023, the company published a world Top 10 Best Plant Based Burgers, among the winning brands were Beyond Meat, NotCo and Sojasun.
