= Jimmy Casper =

French cyclist

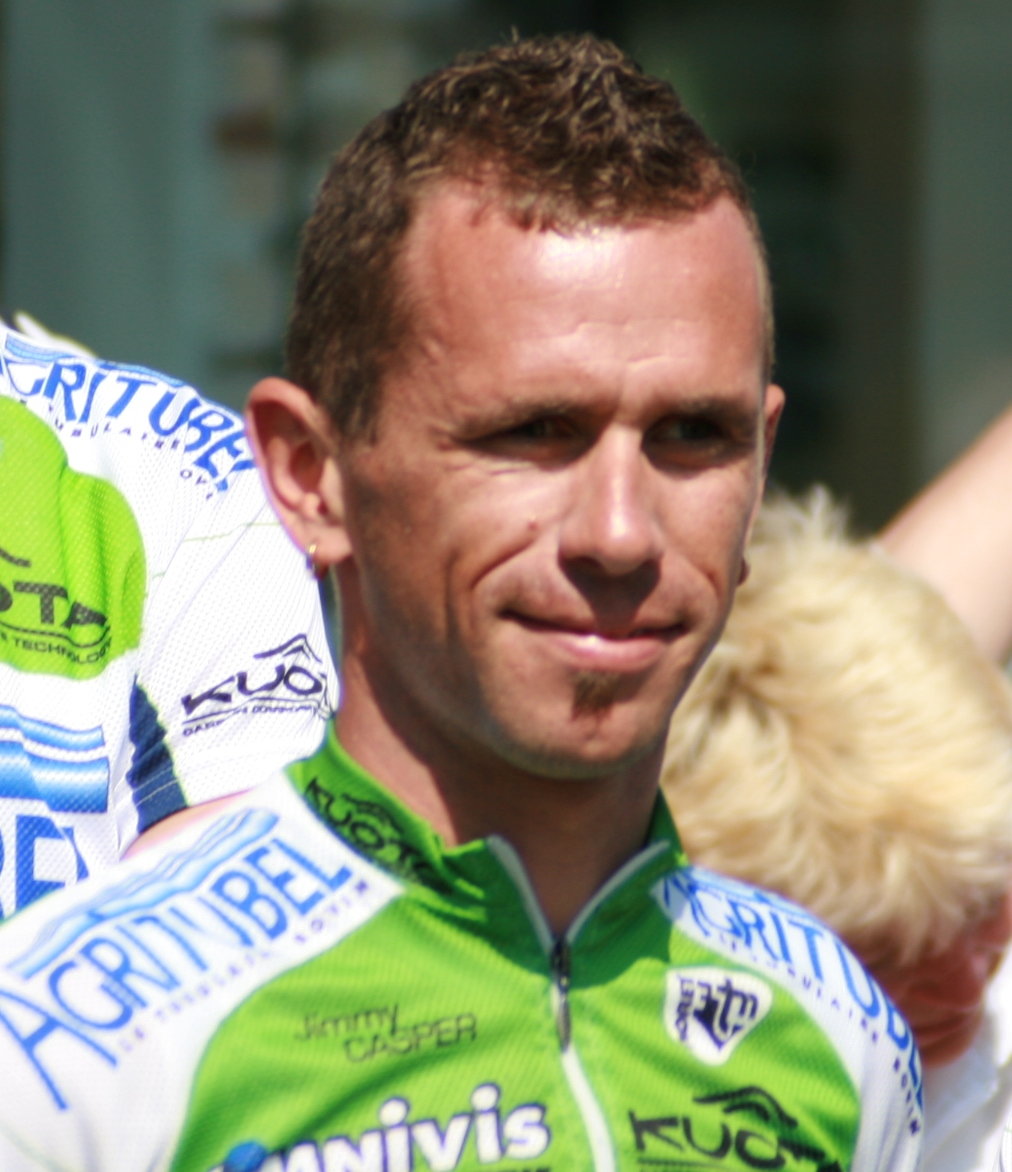
- Casper at the 2008 Four Days of Dunkirk

Personal information
- Full name: Jimmy Casper
- Born: 28 May 1978 (age 48) Montdidier, Somme, France
- Height: 1.75 m (5 ft 9 in)
- Weight: 69 kg (152 lb)

Cycling career
- Sport: Cycling
- Current team: Retired
- Discipline: Road
- Role: Rider
- Rider type: Sprinter

Professional teams
- 1998–2003: Française des Jeux
- 2004–2006: Cofidis
- 2007: Unibet.com
- 2008: Agritubel
- 2009–2011: Besson Chaussures–Sojasun
- 2012: Ag2r–La Mondiale

Major wins
- Grand Tours Tour de France 1 individual stage (2006)

Jimmy Casper (born 28 May 1978) is a French retired road bicycle racer, who competed as a professional between 1998 and 2012. He won stage 1 of the 2006 Tour de France.

== Career ==
He has on two occasions finished in last place in the General classification of the Tour de France, thereby 'winning' the red lantern.

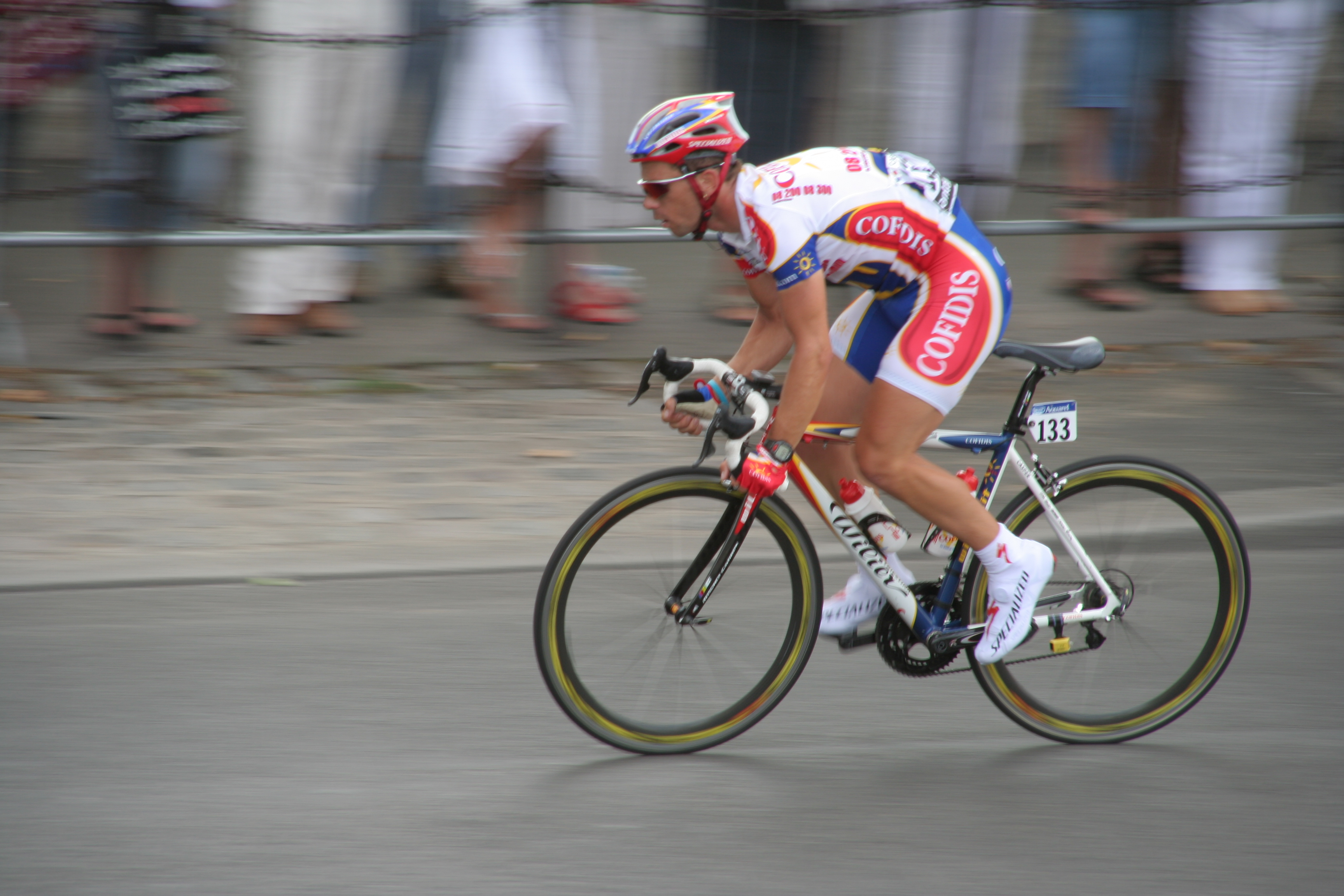
Casper at the 2006 Tour de France.

Casper was suspended from his team, Agritubel because he tested positive for corticosteroid, an asthma drug that is banned unless the user has a medical exemption for its use, during the 2008 Tour de France by the Agence Française de Lutte contre le Dopage. The exemption had been renewed but with a previous asthma medication than the one prescribed and used during the Tour de France. He has been cleared of any charges during the hearing held by the Fédération Française de Cyclisme. For 2009 he signed with the Besson Chaussures–Sojasun team, with whom he enjoyed success, winning two stages at the Étoile de Bessèges, a stage of the Critérium International, the Paris–Camembert, and the Grand Prix de Denain. Casper joined the Ag2r–La Mondiale team for the 2012 season.

In December 2012, Casper announced his retirement as a professional cyclist. He had a total of 61 victories and stated that he would like to remain in the cycling environment with a coaching job.

== Career achievements ==
=== Major results ===
1996
7th Road race, UCI Junior Road World Championships
1999
Deutschland Tour

1st Stages 1, 3, 4 & 8

1st Stage 1a Tour de l'Ain
1st Stage 4a Four Days of Dunkirk
9th Ronde van Midden-Zeeland
2000
8th Overall Tour de Normandie
2001
1st Stage 3 Tour Méditerranéen
1st Stage 2a Route du Sud
1st Stage 2b Circuit des Mines
1st Stage 3 Tour du Poitou-Charentes
6th Overall Étoile de Bessèges
2002
1st Cholet-Pays de Loire
1st Kampioenschap van Vlaanderen
1st Stage 2 GP Erik Breukink
1st Stage 7 Circuit des Mines
1st Stage 9 Tour de l'Avenir
6th Road race, UCI Road World Championships
8th Classic Haribo
2003
1st Stage 3a Giro della Liguria
2nd Overall Driedaagse Van West-Vlaanderen

1st Stage 1

3rd GP de Villers-Cotterêts
6th Kuurne–Brussels–Kuurne
8th Overall GP Erik Breukink

1st Stage 1

8th Grote Prijs Jef Scherens
2004
1st Overall Circuit Franco-Belge

1st Stage 2

1st Kampioenschap van Vlaanderen
1st Stage 1 Four Days of Dunkirk
1st Stage 6 Danmark Rundt
2nd Overall Tour de Picardie

1st Stage 3b

5th Gent–Wevelgem
6th Nokere Koerse
7th Classic Haribo
2005
1st Châteauroux Classic
1st Grand Prix de Denain
1st Stage 5 Étoile de Bessèges
2nd Overall Circuit Franco-Belge
2006
1st Overall Tour de Picardie

1st Stage 3

1st Grand Prix de Denain
Tour de France

1st Stage 1
Held after Stage 1

2nd Tour de Vendée
2007
1st Overall Driedaagse van West-Vlaanderen

1st Stage 1

1st Memorial Samyn
2008
1st Stage 2 Tour Méditerranéen
1st Stage 2 Circuit de Lorraine
2nd Classic Loire Atlantique
2nd Grand Prix de Denain
3rd GP de la Ville de Rennes
7th GP Cholet
8th Overall Boucles de la Mayenne

1st Stage 2

9th Tour de Picardie
10th Route Adélie de Vitré
2009
1st Overall French Road Cycling Cup
1st Paris–Camembert
1st Grand Prix de Denain
1st Châteauroux Classic
Étoile de Bessèges

1st Stages 1 & 2

1st Stage 1 Critérium International
1st Stage 2 Tour de Gironde
1st Stage 1 Ronde de l'Oise
1st Stage 1 Tour du Poitou Charentes et de la Vienne
2nd GP Cholet
3rd Overall Tour de Picardie
4th Grand Prix de Fourmies
6th Overall Boucles de la Mayenne

1st Stage 1

10th Le Samyn
10th Tro-Bro Léon
2010
1st Val d'Ille U Classic 35
1st Stage 1 Tour of Oman
1st Stage 4 Tour de Normandie
1st Stage 3 Tour of Belgium
1st Stage 3 Volta a Portugal
6th Overall Tour du Poitou Charentes et de la Vienne

1st Stage 5

8th Scheldeprijs
8th Grand Prix de Denain
9th GP Cholet
10th Overall Tour de Picardie

1st Stage 3

10th Châteauroux Classic
10th Grand Prix de la Somme
2011
1st Overall Boucles de la Mayenne

1st Stages 2 & 3

1st Grand Prix de Denain
1st Stage 3 Tour de Picardie
1st Stage 1 Tour de l'Ain
7th Le Samyn
9th Paris–Troyes
2012
4th Flèche d'Emeraude
6th Road race, National Road Championships
6th Grand Prix d'Isbergues
10th Grand Prix de Denain

=== Grand Tour general classification results timeline ===
Grand Tour	1999	2000	2001	2002	2003	2004	2005	2006	2007	2008
Giro d'Italia	—	DNF	—	—	DNF	—	—	—	—	—
Tour de France	DNF	—	144	DNF	DNF	147	—	136	—	DNF
Vuelta a España	—	—	—	—	—	—	125	—	—	—

Legend
—	Did not compete
DNF	Did not finish
