= Étienne Tortelier =

French road cyclist

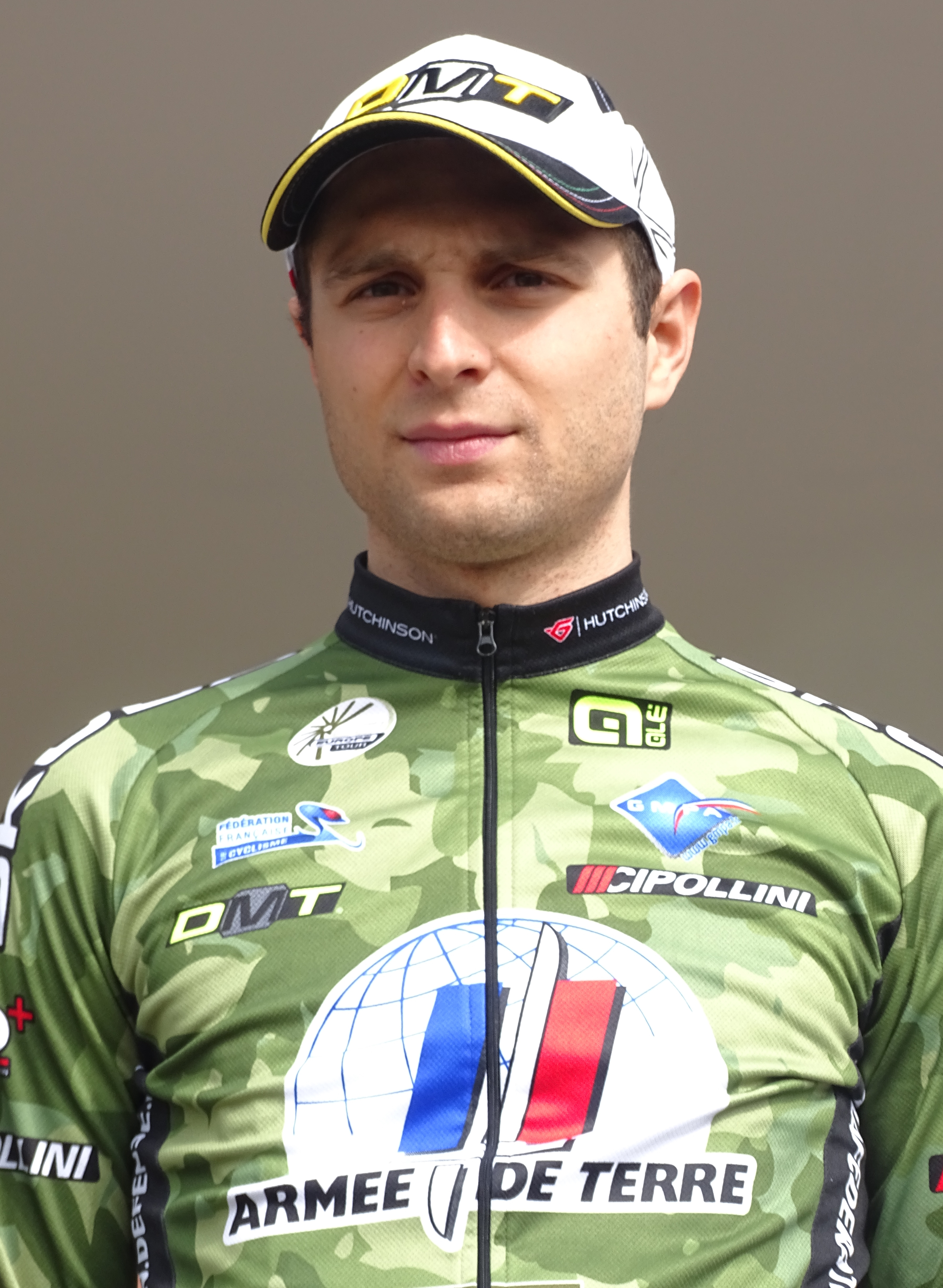
- Tortelier at the 2015 Grand Prix de Denain

Personal information
- Born: 14 April 1990 (age 36) Rennes, France

Cycling career
- Sport: Cycling
- Current team: Sablé Sarthe Cyclisme
- Discipline: Road
- Role: Rider

Amateur teams
- 2009: Super Sport 35–ACNC
- 2010–2011: Sojasun espoir–ACNC
- 2010: Saur–Sojasun (stagiaire)
- 2011: Saur–Sojasun (stagiaire)
- 2014: VC Pays de Loudéac
- 2016–: Sablé Sarthe Cyclisme

Professional teams
- 2012–2013: Saur–Sojasun
- 2015: Armée de Terre

Étienne Tortelier (born 14 April 1990 in Rennes) is a French road cyclist, who currently rides for amateur team Sablé Sarthe Cyclisme.

== Major results ==
2011
4th Overall Mi-Août en Bretagne
