= 2007 La Tropicale Amissa Bongo Ondimbo =

The 2007 La Tropicale Amissa Bongo Ondimbo was held from 7 to 21 January 2007 in Gabon. It was a multiple stage road cycling race that took part over a prologue and five stages.

== Men's stage summary ==
Stage	Date	Start	Finish	Distance	Stage Top 3
P	16 January	Libreville	Libreville		(France) Jimmy Engoulvent (France) Lilian Jégou (Morocco) Mohcena Rhiele
1	17 January	Kango	Lambaréné	140 km	(France) Pierre Rolland (France) Frédéric Guesdon (Germany) Frank Dressler
2	18 January	Lambaréné	Ndjolé	130 km	(Germany) Stefan Heiny (France) Arnaud Gérard (France) Fabien Rey
3	19 January	Bitam	Oyem	100 km	(France) Sébastien Hinault (Norway) Martin Vestby (Finland) Jussi Veikkanen
4	20 January	Oyem	Mitzic	km	(France) Lilian Jégou (Netherlands) Jos Pronk (France) Rémi Pauriol
5	21 January	Libreville	Libreville	135 km	(Germany) Stefan Heiny (France) Sébastien Hinault (France) Jimmy Engoulvent

=== Men's top 10 overall ===
Pos	Rider	Time
1	(France) Frédéric Guesdon	13:22.11
2	(France) Pierre Rolland	+ 0.02
3	(Finland) Jussi Veikkanen	+ 1.24
4	(Germany) Frank Dressler	+ 1.27
5	(France) Jean-Marc Marino	+ 1.46
6	(Germany) Stefan Heiny	+ 6.46
7	(France) Julien El Fares	+ 6.51
8	(France) Mickaël Malle	+ 8.39
9	(Burkina Faso) Abdul-Wahab Sawadogo	+ 9.09
10	(Egypt) Hescham Fadel	+ 9.15
