= Daniel McLay =

British road cyclist (born 1992)

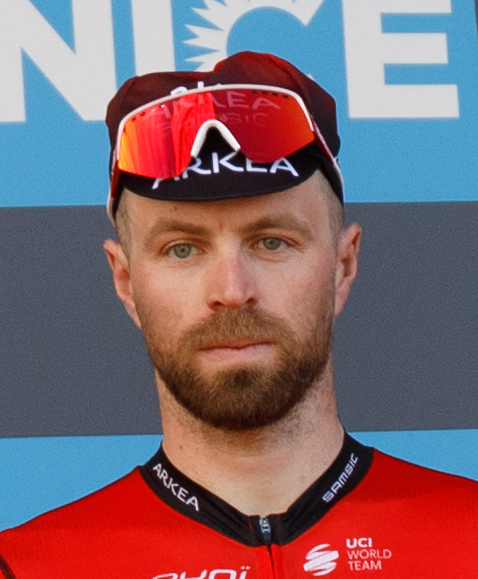
- McLay at the 2023 Paris-Nice

Personal information
- Born: 3 January 1992 (age 34) Wellington, New Zealand
- Height: 1.87 m (6 ft 2 in)
- Weight: 74 kg (163 lb; 11.7 st)

Cycling career
- Sport: Cycling
- Current team: Visma–Lease a Bike
- Disciplines: Road; Track; Cyclo-cross
- Role: Rider
- Rider type: Sprinter

Amateur teams
- 2008: Leicestershire Road Club
- 2009: Univega.co.uk
- 2011–2014: Omega Pharma–Lotto Davo

Professional teams
- 2015–2017: Bretagne–Séché Environnement
- 2018–2019: EF Education First–Drapac p/b Cannondale
- 2020–2024: Arkéa–Samsic
- 2025: Visma–Lease a Bike

Major wins
- One-day races and Classics GP de Denain (2016) Tour de l'Eurométropole (2017)

Daniel "Dan" McLay (born 3 January 1992) is a retired British racing cyclist, competing in road, track and cyclo-cross, who last rode for UCI WorldTeam Visma–Lease a Bike. His first season as a professional was 2015, racing for French pro-continental and 2014 Tour de France wildcard outfit Bretagne–Séché Environnement. Primarily a sprinter, McLay is also competent in the Flemish racing scene and has a particular affinity to the Northern Classics. He was named in the start list for the 2016 Tour de France.

== Career ==
=== Junior career ===
Born in Wellington, New Zealand, McLay moved to the United Kingdom as an infant and was brought up in Leicester. McLay began cycling competitively at the age of six. Following his success as under 16 rider at the British National Track Championships, he represented Great Britain at the 2007 European Youth Olympic Festival, competing in the criterium and road race events. He says that he was not very good at sports that require coordination as a school-boy and thus this fuelled his desire to continue competing in cycling.

McLay was selected to represent Britain at the Junior European Cyclo-cross Championships in 2008, where he finished last.

In 2009, McLay became a member of British Cycling's Olympic Academy. McLay went on to win the bronze medal in the Madison at the UEC European Track Championships with partner Sam Harrison. He also represented Great Britain at the 2009 Junior UCI Cyclo-cross World Championships.

In 2010 he became World Champion in the Junior World Madison Track Championships, with Simon Yates.

In 2014 he won a stage of the Tour de l'Avenir (English: The Tour of the Future). He also came seventh in Tour of Britain stages, a strong showing given that sprinters such as Mark Cavendish, Marcel Kittel, Mark Renshaw and Adam Blythe were also competing, although he said that seventh was not a representation of what he could have achieved.

=== Professional career ===
==== Bretagne–Séché Environnement (2015–17) ====
He signed for the Bretagne–Séché Environnement professional continental team for the 2015 season. He won his first professional victory in Stage 3 of La Tropicale Amissa Bongo. In the first UCI World Tour race of his career, Paris–Nice, McLay came eighth in stage 5.

His second professional win came at the 2016 Grand Prix de Denain, a French 1.HC race, weaving his way from distance through the centre of the bunch to win it on the line. His second win came a month later in the Grand Prix de la Somme, beating Nacer Bouhanni into 2nd place. Due to those two wins, McLay was selected to take part in his first Tour de France, and finished in the Top 10 in his first sprint finish. After another two top 10 finishes, McLay finished on the podium on Stage 6 behind Mark Cavendish and Marcel Kittel.

In October 2017 McLay won the Tour de l'Eurométropole, pipping Anthony Turgis to the line after Turgis started his celebration early following a solo attack from the front group.

==== EF Education First–Drapac (2018–19) ====
After his Tour de l'Eurométropole win, it was announced that McLay would join the WorldTour peloton by signing with EF Education First–Drapac p/b Cannondale for the 2018 season.

== Major results ==
=== Road ===
2010
National Junior Championships

1st Road race
2nd Time trial

1st Overall Junior Tour of Wales
2nd Paris–Roubaix Juniors
6th Overall Driedaagse van Axel

1st Stage 1

2011
1st Grand Prix de Waregem
6th Dorpenomloop Rucphen
2012
1st De Drie Zustersteden
1st Grand Prix José Dubois
2nd Kernen Omloop Echt-Susteren
2013
2nd Dorpenomloop Rucphen
4th Time trial, National Under-23 Championships
4th Paris–Chauny
5th Ster van Zwolle
5th Textielprijs Vichte
6th Overall Paris–Arras Tour
2014
1st Overall Ronde van Oost-Vlaanderen

1st Stage 2

Tour de Normandie

1st Points classification
1st Stage 3

1st Stage 3 Tour de l'Avenir
2nd Dorpenomloop Rucphen
3rd Time trial, National Under-23 Championships
4th Overall Paris–Arras Tour

1st Stage 3

5th Grand Prix de la ville de Pérenchies
7th Paris–Tours Espoirs
10th Beaumont Trophy
2015 (1 pro win)
1st Otley Grand Prix
1st Stage 3 La Tropicale Amissa Bongo
6th Brussels Cycling Classic
7th Paris–Bourges
8th Overall Tour de Picardie
8th Velothon Berlin
2016 (2)
1st Grand Prix de Denain
1st Grand Prix de la Somme
4th Grand Prix d'Isbergues
5th Overall Tour de Picardie
10th Overall Boucles de la Mayenne
10th Scheldeprijs
2017 (2)
1st Tour de l'Eurométropole
1st Trofeo Playa de Palma
3rd Trofeo Felanitx–Ses Salines–Campos–Porreres
2018 (1)
1st Stage 4 Circuit de la Sarthe
2019 (2)
1st Stage 1 Herald Sun Tour
1st Stage 2 Tour of Guangxi
2020 (2)
Volta a Portugal

1st Stages 5 & 6

8th Bretagne Classic
2021
2nd Ronde van Limburg
6th Paris–Bourges
7th Elfstedenronde
8th Overall Boucles de la Mayenne
9th Circuit de Wallonie
2022
4th Kuurne–Brussels–Kuurne
4th Heistse Pijl
7th Scheldeprijs
2023
4th Paris–Chauny
10th Gent–Wevelgem
2024
10th Surf Coast Classic

==== Grand Tour general classification results timeline ====
Grand Tour	2016	2017	2018	2019	2020	2021	2022	2023	2024
Giro d'Italia	Has not contested during his career								
Tour de France	170	DNF	—	—	—	DNF	—	—	136
Vuelta a España	—	—	—	—	—	—	120	—	—

Legend
—	Did not compete
DNF	Did not finish

=== Track ===
2008
1st Scratch, National Junior Championships
2009
National Junior Championships

1st Madison (with George Atkins)
1st Points race
2nd Kilo
3rd Individual pursuit
3rd Scratch

3rd Madison, UEC European Junior Championships (with Sam Harrison)
2010
UCI World Junior Championships

1st Madison (with Simon Yates)
2nd Team pursuit

National Junior Championships

1st Scratch
2nd Individual pursuit

2nd Madison, National Championships (with Sam Harrison)

=== Cyclo-cross ===
2008–2009
3rd National Junior Championships
2009–2010
3rd Junior Bredene
