= Jimmy Engoulvent =

French cyclist

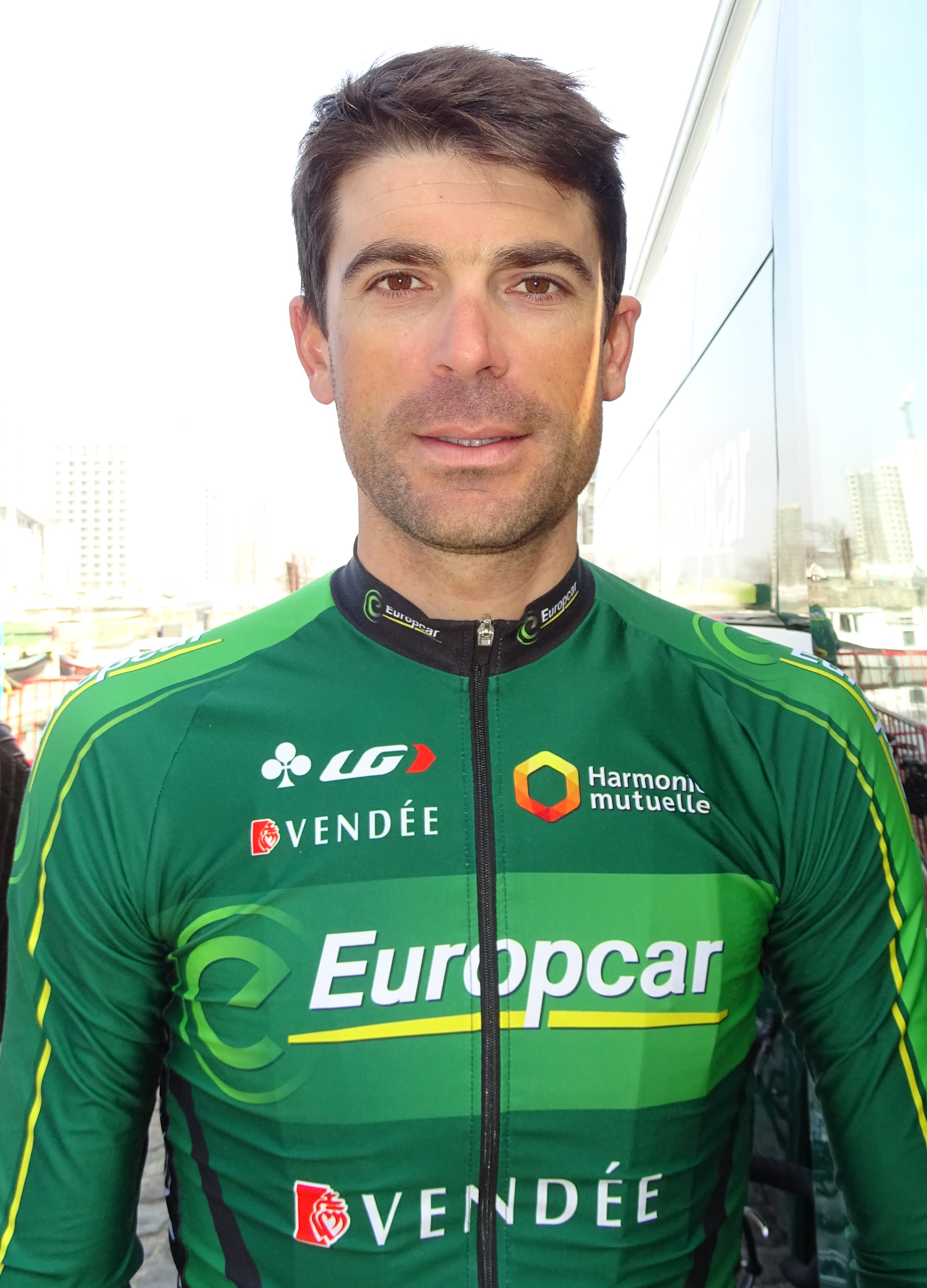

Personal information
- Full name: Jimmy Engoulvent
- Born: 7 December 1979 (age 46) Le Mans, France
- Height: 1.87 m (6 ft 2 in)
- Weight: 79 kg (174 lb)

Cycling career
- Sport: Cycling
- Current team: B&B Hotels p/b KTM
- Discipline: Road
- Role: Rider (retired); Team manager
- Rider type: Rouleur

Amateur teams
- 1992–1999: UC Sabolienne
- 2000–2001: Vendée U–Pays de la Loire
- 2000: Bonjour (stagiaire)

Professional teams
- 2001–2003: Bonjour
- 2004–2005: Cofidis
- 2006–2008: Crédit Agricole
- 2009–2013: Besson Chaussures–Sojasun
- 2014–2015: Team Europcar

Managerial teams
- 2016–2017: Direct Énergie (directeur sportif)
- 2018–: Vital Concept (directeur sportif)

Major wins
- Four Days of Dunkirk (2012)

Jimmy Engoulvent (born 7 December 1979) is a French former road racing cyclist, who competed professionally between 2001 and 2015 for the Cofidis, Crédit Agricole, Sojasun and Team Europcar teams. Since retiring, Engoulvent has worked as a directeur sportif for the Direct Énergie team, before moving to Vital Concept for the 2018 season.

== Career ==
Born in Le Mans, Engoulvent was a prologue time trial specialist, having won many prologues throughout his professional career, he also specialised in small field sprints. He was the lanterne rouge of the 2012 Tour de France, as he finished last of the 153 riders to complete the Tour.

Engoulvent joined Team Europcar for the 2014 season, after his previous team – Sojasun – folded at the end of the 2013 season.

== Major results ==
2001
8th Overall Le Triptyque des Monts et Châteaux
2002
2nd Grand Prix de la Ville de Lillers
2003
1st Stage 2b Tour de la Somme
6th Grand Prix de Denain
7th Grand Prix Rudy Dhaenens
2004
3rd Overall Tour du Poitou-Charentes
3rd Tartu GP
8th Overall Volta ao Algarve
8th Grand Prix d'Ouverture La Marseillaise
9th Le Samyn
2005
3rd Cholet-Pays de Loire
10th Eindhoven Team Time Trial
2006
Tour Méditerranéen

1st Mountains classification
1st Stage 3 (TTT)

3rd Overall Tour de Picardie
2007
1st Prologue La Tropicale Amissa Bongo Ondimbo
1st Prologue Tour de Luxembourg
8th Eindhoven Team Time Trial
9th Grand Prix de Denain
2008
3rd Grand Prix de Denain
5th Overall Delta Tour Zeeland
8th Overall Tour Ivoirien de la Paix

1st Stage 4

2009
1st Stage 2 Four Days of Dunkirk
1st Stage 4 Tour Alsace
1st Stage 3 Circuito Montañés
1st Stage 4 Tour de Gironde
4th Overall Tour de Bretagne

1st Stage 5

6th Overall Circuit de la Sarthe

1st Stage 3 (ITT)

8th Overall Tour de Picardie
9th Overall Les 3 Jours de Vaucluse

1st Stage 2

2010
1st Overall Tour du Poitou-Charentes

1st Stage 3

1st Prologue Tour de Luxembourg
1st Prologue Boucles de la Mayenne
1st Prologue Volta a Portugal
8th Val d'Ille Classic
10th Tro-Bro Léon
2011
1st Prologue Vuelta a Andalucía
7th Overall Driedaagse van West-Vlaanderen
10th Binche–Tournai–Binche
2012
1st Overall Four Days of Dunkirk

1st Stage 3

1st Prologue Tour de Luxembourg
3rd Flèche d'Emeraude
2013
1st Prologue Tour de Luxembourg
2014
1st Stage 5 Four Days of Dunkirk
1st Prologue Boucles de la Mayenne
6th Cholet-Pays de Loire
2015
4th Tro-Bro Léon

=== Grand Tour general classification results timeline ===
| Grand Tour | 2004 | 2005 | 2006 | 2007 | 2008 | 2009 | 2010 | 2011 | 2012 | 2013 | 2014 | 2015 |
|---|---|---|---|---|---|---|---|---|---|---|---|---|
| Giro d'Italia | Did not contest during his career | | | | | | | | | | | |
| Tour de France | 138 | — | DNF | — | 136 | — | — | 158 | 153 | — | — | — |
| Vuelta a España | — | — | — | — | — | — | — | — | — | — | 157 | 133 |

Legend
| — | Did not compete |
| DNF | Did not finish |
