= Benoît Daeninck =

French road and track cyclist

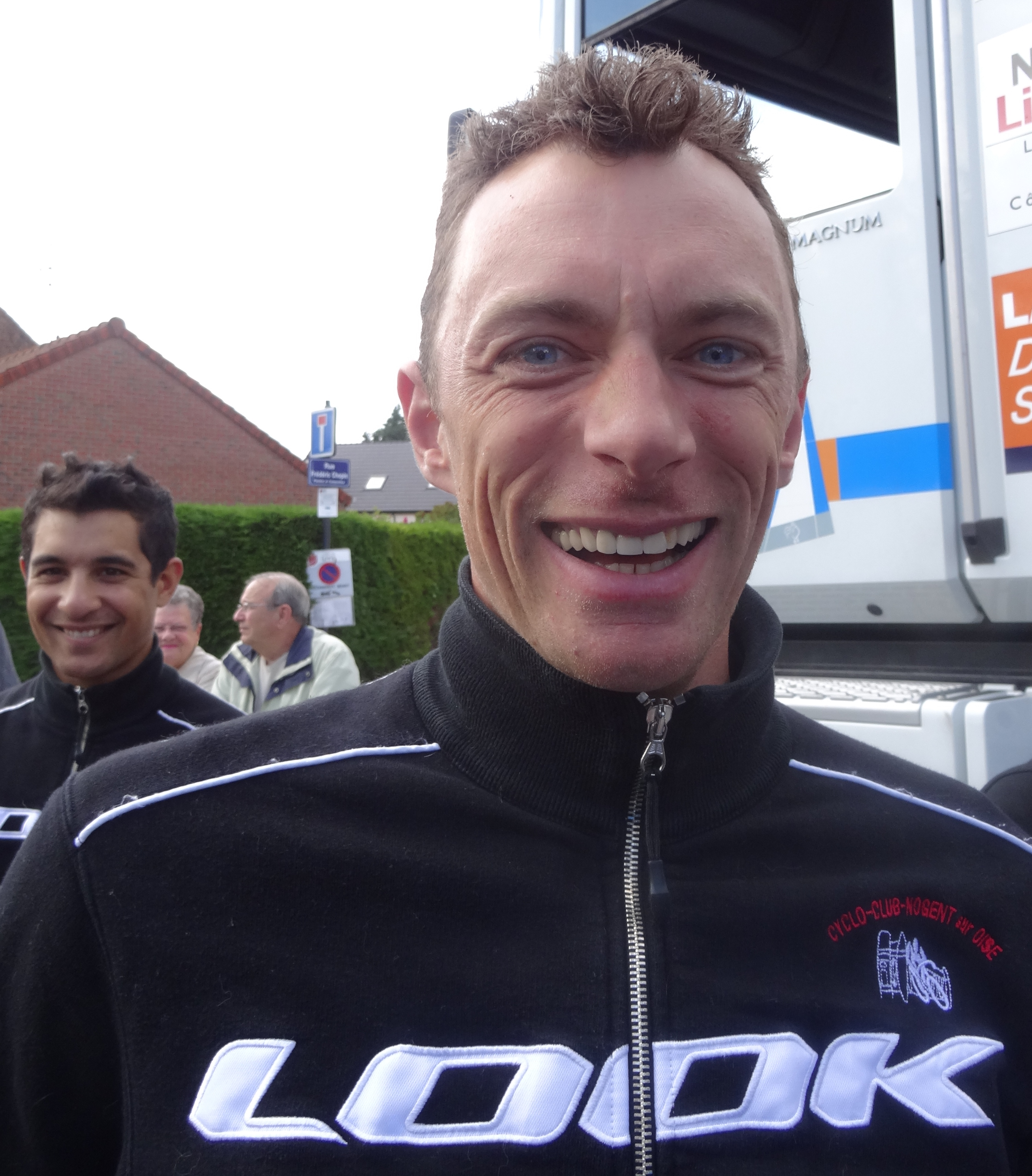
- Daeninck in 2014.

Personal information
- Full name: Benoît Daeninck
- Born: 27 December 1981 (age 44) Marles-en-Brie, France

Cycling career
- Sport: Cycling
- Disciplines: Road; Track
- Role: Rider

Amateur teams
- 2000: AC Boulogne-Billancourt
- 2001: CM Aubervilliers 93
- 2002: AVC Aix-en-Provence
- 2003–2004: US Créteil
- 2005: AC Boulogne-Billancourt
- 2006–2007: UV Aube
- 2008–2009: CC Nogent-sur-Oise
- 2012–2016: CC Nogent-sur-Oise

Professional team
- 2010–2011: Roubaix–Lille Métropole

Benoit Daeninck (born 27 December 1981) is a French road and track cyclist, who most recently competed for French amateur team CC Nogent-sur-Oise. He competed in the team pursuit event at the 2010 and 2011 UCI Track Cycling World Championships.

== Major results ==
1998
1st Team pursuit, National Junior Track Championships
2001
3rd Team pursuit, National Track Championships
2003
3rd Points race, National Under-23 Track Championships
4th Chrono Champenois
2005
3rd Madison, National Track Championships
2007
National Track Championships

1st Points race
2nd Individual pursuit

1st Road race, Champagne-Ardenne Regional Road Championships
1st Grand Prix de la Ville de Lillers
Tour de Guadeloupe

1st Prologue & Stage 7

4th Overall Ronde de l'Oise

1st Stage 3

10th Boucle de l'Artois
2008
1st Road race, Picardy Regional Road Championships
2nd Grand Prix de la Ville de Lillers
2009
1st Stage 8 Tour de Normandie
1st Stage 4 Boucles de la Mayenne
2nd Points race, National Track Championships
4th Overall Circuit des Ardennes

1st Stage 1

5th Grand Prix de la ville de Nogent-sur-Oise
2010
National Track Championships

1st Madison (with Damien Gaudin)
1st Team pursuit
3rd Points race

1st Grand Prix de la Ville de Lillers
1st Stage 3 Tour de Bretagne
6th Grand Prix de la ville de Nogent-sur-Oise
6th Tro-Bro Léon
2011
National Track Championships

1st Points race
1st Team pursuit

5th Tro-Bro Léon
2012
1st Points race, National Track Championships
1st Ronde Pévéloise
1st Mountains classification Circuit des Ardennes
8th Paris–Troyes
2013
1st Grand Prix de la Ville de Lillers
1st Ronde Pévéloise
1st Grand Prix des Marbriers
2nd Paris–Mantes-en-Yvelines
National Track Championships

3rd Points race
3rd Team pursuit

4th Overall Ronde de l'Oise
2014
National Track Championships

1st Madison (with Marc Fournier)
2nd Team pursuit

1st Ronde Pévéloise
3rd Grand Prix de la Ville de Lillers
4th Paris–Mantes-en-Yvelines
2015
6th Paris–Chauny
2016
1st Team pursuit, National Track Championships
