= Nacer Bouhanni =

French racing cyclist (born 1990)

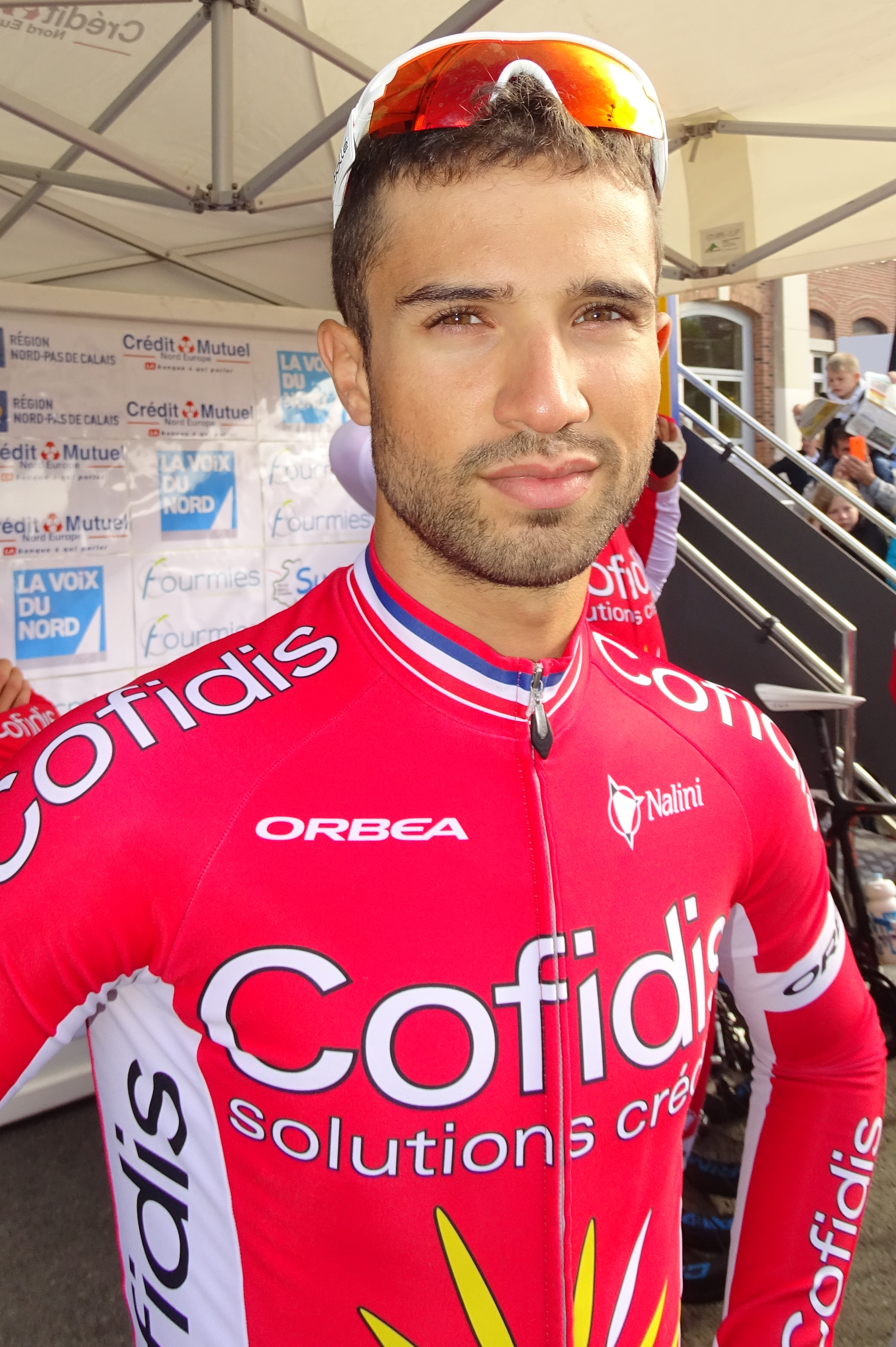
- Bouhanni at the 2015 Grand Prix de Fourmies

Personal information
- Full name: Nacer Bouhanni
- Born: 25 July 1990 (age 36) Épinal, France
- Height: 1.75 m (5 ft 9 in)
- Weight: 66 kg (146 lb)

Cycling career
- Sport: Cycling
- Current team: Retired
- Discipline: Road
- Role: Rider
- Rider type: Sprinter

Amateur teams
- 2006: UC Contrexéville Mirecourt
- 2007–2009: SC Sarreguemines
- 2010: UVCA Troyes
- 2010: Française des Jeux (stagiaire)

Professional teams
- 2011–2014: FDJ
- 2015–2019: Cofidis
- 2020–2023: Arkéa–Samsic

Major wins
- Grand Tours Giro d'Italia Points classification (2014) 3 individual stages (2014) Vuelta a España 3 individual stages (2014, 2018) Stage races Tour de Picardie (2016) Single-day races and Classics National Road Race Championships (2012) GP de Fourmies (2013, 2017) Tour de Vendée (2013, 2016) Nokere Koerse (2017) Other UCI Europe Tour (2015, 2017)

Nacer Bouhanni (born 25 July 1990) is a French former professional racing cyclist, who competed as a professional from 2011 to 2023. A sprinter, he was the winner of the 2012 French National Road Race Championships. Although his first Grand Tour was in 2012, his real breakthrough was in 2014 when he won three stages and the points classification in the Giro d'Italia. In August 2014 it was announced that Bouhanni would leave FDJ and join Cofidis on an initial two-year deal from 2015.

== Career ==
=== FDJ (2011–14) ===
After a good amateur career, which saw him winning the national cycling military championships, he signed a contract with FDJ in 2011. In January he got his first professional stage win in La Tropicale Amissa Bongo.

Bouhanni won his first stage of the 2012 season by winning stage 1 of the Étoile de Bessèges. Later that season he got his breakthrough win by winning the French National Road Race Championships ahead of his teammate Arnaud Démare. He also rode his first Grand Tour at the Vuelta a España, where his best finish was second on stage 10.

The 2013 season started well with a stage win in the Tour of Oman. Afterwards he rode Paris–Nice, where he got a stage win and the leader's jersey, however he crashed out of the race the very next day. He rode the Giro d'Italia, where he finished second to Mark Cavendish on the first stage, but abandoned on stage 13. He also rode his first Tour de France in 2013, however he got sick and retired after a crash on stage 5.

The 2014 season was very successful for Bouhanni, with numerous wins including three victories in the Giro d'Italia as well as earning the points classification. In the Vuelta a España, Bouhanni won two mass sprints, Stages 2 and 8. The latter saw a battle occur in the crosswinds and Bouhanni managed to stay with the first group on the road to win the sprint ahead of Michael Matthews and Peter Sagan. After withdrawing from the Vuelta, Bouhanni gave an interview where he was critical of the FDJ management. As a response, Marc Madiot sidelined him for the remainder of the season, at the end of which Bouhanni left the team for Cofidis.

=== Cofidis (2015–19) ===
He had to wait until April 2015 to get his first victory for his new team on the opening stage of the Circuit de la Sarthe in a bunch sprint as the breakaway was caught inside the final kilometre. He also won the last stage of the event. A little later on that month, he won the Grand Prix de Denain for the second year in a row. He won his team's first UCI World Tour race of the season on stage 2 of the Critérium du Dauphiné in a bunch sprint. He added a win on Stage 4 after a hectic finale which saw a flurry of attacks. Bouhanni was forced to withdraw from the 2015 Tour de France after a crash at the 12-kilometre (7.5-mile) mark of Stage 5.

In 2016, Bouhanni won stage 1 of the Volta a Catalunya and took the leader's jersey. Bouhanni had to withdraw from the French National Road Race Championships due to a hand injury sustained in an altercation with fellow guests at a hotel the night before the race. The injury also caused him to withdraw from the Tour de France. On 21 August, Bouhanni initially won the EuroEyes Cyclassics but he was later relegated for irregular sprinting.

=== Arkéa–Samsic ===
In October 2019, Bouhanni signed for the Arkéa–Samsic team.

== Incidents ==
Bouhanni was penalised one minute time for hitting another rider, Jack Bauer, in the 2017 Tour de France. The race jury also levied a fine of 200 Swiss francs. Bouhanni was also investigated after contact with Anthony Maldonado at the end of a stage in the Tour de l'Ain in August. The race jury decided to take no action. Later in 2017, after the Paris–Bourges race, Bouhanni had to be separated from Rudy Barbier, who had won the race. Bouhanni subsequently apologised for his behaviour, but maintained that Barbier had ridden dangerously and irregularly in the finishing sprint. In May 2018, French sports newspaper L'Équipe reported that Bouhanni had been involved in a "violent altercation" with Cofidis directeur sportif Roberto Damiani on the team's bus following the Eschborn–Frankfurt race, which Bouhanni did not finish.

In the 2021 Cholet-Pays de la Loire, Bouhanni initially finished third, but was disqualified by the race jury for an aggressive manoeuvre in the final sprint. Bouhanni started his sprint behind his leadout man, and as he began to accelerate up to speed, he veered to his left to try and get onto the wheel of eventual winner Elia Viviani. In doing so, Bouhanni pinned Jake Stewart against the barriers. Though Stewart was able to stay upright and avoid causing a crash, the contact from Bouhanni sapped his momentum and he ended up finishing 29th. After the race, Stewart and other fellow sprinters took to social media to criticise Bouhanni and call for his suspension, drawing similarities between Bouhanni's actions and those of Dylan Groenewegen at the 2020 Tour de Pologne, which caused Fabio Jakobsen to crash and sustain heavy injuries. On 12 May 2021, for his 'dangerous conduct,' the Union Cycliste Internationale (UCI) handed Bouhanni a retroactive two-month suspension, expiring on 7 June 2021.

== Major results ==
2010
5th Overall Tour de Gironde

1st Stage 2

2011
1st Stage 3 La Tropicale Amissa Bongo
5th Grand Prix de la Somme
8th Grand Prix de Denain
8th Paris–Troyes
2012
1st Road race, National Road Championships
1st Overall Circuit de Lorraine

1st Points classification
1st Young rider classification
1st Stage 1

1st Halle–Ingooigem
1st Stage 1 Étoile de Bessèges
1st Stage 1 Tour de Wallonie
2nd Flèche d'Emeraude
2nd Paris–Bourges
6th Overall Tour de l'Eurométropole

1st Stage 4

9th Cholet-Pays de Loire
9th Grand Prix de Wallonie
2013
1st Val d'Ille Classic
1st Grand Prix de Fourmies
1st Tour de Vendée
Tour of Beijing

1st Points classification
1st Stages 2 & 3

1st Stage 1 Paris–Nice
1st Stage 6 Tour of Oman
1st Stage 2 Circuit de la Sarthe
2nd Omloop van het Houtland
3rd Grand Prix de Denain
3rd Halle–Ingooigem
3rd Brussels Cycling Classic
8th Overall Tour du Poitou-Charentes

1st Points classification
1st Stages 1, 2 & 3

2014
1st Grand Prix de Denain
Giro d'Italia

1st Points classification
1st Azzurri d'Italia classification
1st Stages 4, 7 & 10

Vuelta a España

1st Stages 2 & 8
Held after Stages 2–3

Circuit de la Sarthe

1st Points classification
1st Stage 1

1st Stage 1 Paris–Nice
1st Stage 4 Eneco Tour
1st Stage 2 Étoile de Bessèges
1st Stage 1 Critérium International
2nd Road race, National Road Championships
3rd Le Samyn
3rd Nokere Koerse
10th Road race, UCI Road World Championships
2015
1st UCI Europe Tour
1st French Road Cycling Cup
1st Halle–Ingooigem
1st Circuito de Getxo
1st Grand Prix d'Isbergues
1st Grand Prix de Denain
1st Nationale Sluitingsprijs
Critérium du Dauphiné

1st Points classification
1st Stages 2 & 4

Circuit de la Sarthe

1st Points classification
1st Stages 1 & 4

Tour de l'Ain

1st Points classification
1st Stages 1 & 2

2nd Paris–Bourges
2nd Route Adélie
3rd Grand Prix de Fourmies
4th Trofeo Santanyi–Ses Salines–Campos
6th Milan–San Remo
9th Polynormande
2016
1st Overall Tour de Picardie

1st Points classification
1st Stages 1 & 2

1st Tour de Vendée
Volta a Catalunya

1st Stages 1 & 2

Tour du Poitou-Charentes

1st Stages 1 & 3

1st Stage 4 Paris–Nice
1st Stage 1 Critérium du Dauphiné
1st Stage 2 Vuelta a Andalucía
2nd Trofeo Playa de Palma
2nd Grand Prix de la Somme
2nd Grand Prix de Fourmies
3rd Kuurne–Brussels–Kuurne
3rd Brussels Cycling Classic
4th Milan–San Remo
5th Clásica de Almería
7th Paris–Tours
2017
1st UCI Europe Tour
1st Grand Prix de Fourmies
1st Nokere Koerse
1st Paris–Camembert
1st Stage 4 Volta a Catalunya
1st Stage 2 Tour de Yorkshire
1st Stage 2 Tour du Poitou-Charentes
1st Stage 2 Tour de l'Ain
2nd Road race, National Road Championships
2nd Grand Prix de Denain
3rd Scheldeprijs
3rd Trofeo Playa de Palma
4th La Roue Tourangelle
7th Grand Prix d'Isbergues
8th Milan–San Remo
8th Bretagne Classic
9th EuroEyes Cyclassics
2018
1st Grote Prijs Marcel Kint
Boucles de la Mayenne

1st Points classification
1st Stages 2 & 3

1st Stage 6 Vuelta a España
1st Stage 1 Route d'Occitanie
1st Stage 3 Four Days of Dunkirk
2nd Ronde van Limburg
6th Overall Dubai Tour
2019
2nd Grote Prijs Marcel Kint
4th Three Days of Bruges–De Panne
5th La Roue Tourangelle
6th Elfstedenronde
7th Heistse Pijl
7th Cholet-Pays de Loire
2020
1st Overall French Road Cycling Cup
1st Grand Prix d'Isbergues
1st Paris–Chauny
1st Stage 1 Tour de la Provence
2nd Overall Saudi Tour

1st Points classification
1st Stage 4

3rd Brussels Cycling Classic
3rd Paris–Camembert
6th Milano–Torino
8th Trofeo Campos, Porreres, Felanitx, Ses Salines
2021
2nd La Roue Tourangelle
2nd Grote Prijs Jef Scherens
4th Paris–Chauny
6th Eurométropole Tour
2022
1st La Roue Tourangelle
2nd Milano–Torino
2nd Clásica de Almería
3rd Classic Brugge–De Panne
2023
6th Milano–Torino

=== Grand Tour general classification results timeline ===
| Grand Tour | 2012 | 2013 | 2014 | 2015 | 2016 | 2017 | 2018 | 2019 | 2020 | 2021 | 2022 |
|---|---|---|---|---|---|---|---|---|---|---|---|
| Giro d'Italia | — | DNF | 140 | — | — | — | — | — | — | — | — |
| Tour de France | — | DNF | — | DNF | — | 138 | — | — | — | DNF | — |
| Vuelta a España | DNF | — | DNF | DNF | — | — | DNF | — | — | — | — |

=== Classic results timeline ===
| Monument | 2012 | 2013 | 2014 | 2015 | 2016 | 2017 | 2018 | 2019 | 2020 | 2021 | 2022 |
|---|---|---|---|---|---|---|---|---|---|---|---|
| Milan–San Remo | — | — | — | 6 | 4 | 8 | — | 62 | 38 | 19 | 27 |
| Tour of Flanders | Has not contested during his career | | | | | | | | | | |
| Paris–Roubaix | Has not contested during his career | | | | | | | | | | |
| Liège–Bastogne–Liège | Has not contested during his career | | | | | | | | | | |
| Giro di Lombardia | Has not contested during his career | | | | | | | | | | |
| Classic | 2012 | 2013 | 2014 | 2015 | 2016 | 2017 | 2018 | 2019 | 2020 | 2021 | 2022 |
| Kuurne–Brussels–Kuurne | — | NH | — | 18 | 3 | 33 | — | DNF | — | — | — |
| Milano–Torino | — | — | — | — | — | — | — | — | 6 | — | 2 |
| Gent–Wevelgem | — | — | — | DNF | DNF | — | — | — | — | — | — |
| Scheldeprijs | — | — | — | — | — | 3 | — | — | 11 | DNF | DNF |
| Hamburg Cyclassics | — | — | — | — | 27 | 9 | — | — | Not held | | — |
| Bretagne Classic | — | — | — | — | DNF | 8 | — | — | — | — | — |
| Paris–Tours | 16 | — | — | 42 | 7 | 22 | — | — | 18 | — | |

Legend
| — | Did not compete |
| DNF | Did not finish |
| IP | In progress |
| NH | Not held |

== Personal life ==
Bouhanni has a son with his partner, actress Hafsia Herzi.
