= 2002 Grand Prix de Denain =

Race details
- Dates: 25 April 2002
- Stages: 1
- Distance: 191 km (118.7 mi)
- Winning time: 4h 24' 17"

Results
	Winner	Alberto Vinale (ITA)
	Second	Frédéric Finot (FRA)
	Third	Damien Nazon (FRA)

The 2002 Grand Prix de Denain was the 44th edition of the Grand Prix de Denain cycle race and was held on 25 April 2002. The race was won by Alberto Vinale.

== General classification ==
Final general classification

Rank	Rider	Time
1	Alberto Vinale (ITA)	4h 24' 17"
2	Frédéric Finot (FRA)	+ 0"
3	Damien Nazon (FRA)	+ 7"
4	Jean-Patrick Nazon (FRA)	+ 7"
5	Jo Planckaert (BEL)	+ 7"
6	Ludovic Capelle (BEL)	+ 7"
7	Martin Hvastija (SLO)	+ 7"
8	Allan Johansen (DEN)	+ 7"
9	Médéric Clain (FRA)	+ 7"
10	Christophe Detilloux (BEL)	+ 7"
