= 2014 Grand Prix de Denain =

Race details
- Dates: 17 April 2014
- Stages: 1
- Distance: 202 km (125.5 mi)
- Winning time: 4h 36' 38"

Results
	Winner	Nacer Bouhanni (FRA)
	Second	Matteo Pelucchi (ITA)
	Third	Francesco Chicchi (ITA)

The 2014 Grand Prix de Denain was the 56th edition of the Grand Prix de Denain cycle race and was held on 17 April 2014. The race started and finished in Denain. The race was won by Nacer Bouhanni.

== General classification ==
Final general classification

Rank	Rider	Time
1	Nacer Bouhanni (FRA)	4h 36' 38"
2	Matteo Pelucchi (ITA)	+ 0"
3	Francesco Chicchi (ITA)	+ 0"
4	Kenny van Hummel (NED)	+ 0"
5	Yauheni Hutarovich (BLR)	+ 0"
6	Yannis Yssaad (FRA)	+ 0"
7	Edwin Ávila (COL)	+ 0"
8	Benjamin Giraud (FRA)	+ 0"
9	Tom Van Asbroeck (BEL)	+ 0"
10	Kristian Sbaragli (ITA)	+ 0"
