= Cyril Bessy =

French cyclist

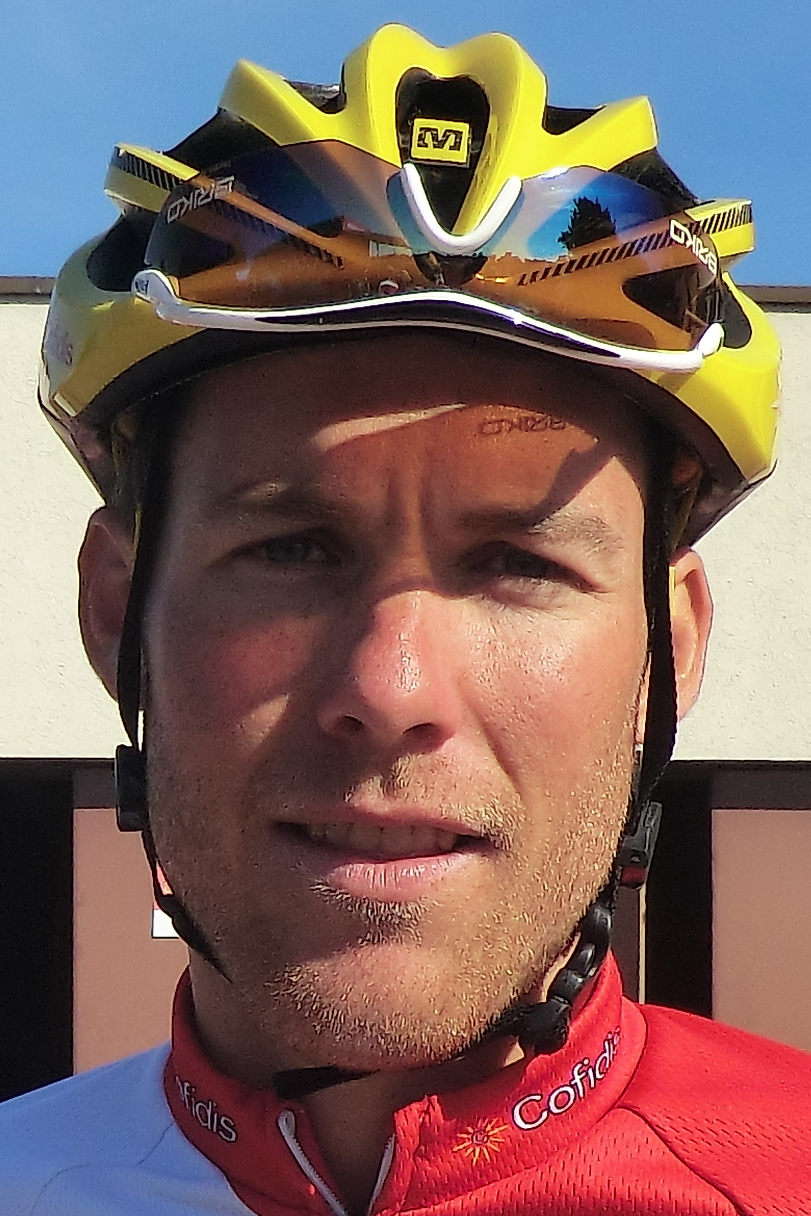
- Bessy in 2013

Personal information
- Born: 29 May 1986 (age 40) Villefranche-sur-Saône, France
- Height: 1.76 m (5 ft 9 in)
- Weight: 69 kg (152 lb; 10.9 st)

Cycling career
- Sport: Cycling
- Current team: Retired
- Discipline: Road
- Role: Rider

Amateur team
- 2005–2008: CR4C Roanne

Professional teams
- 2008: Crédit Agricole (stagiaire)
- 2009–2012: Besson Chaussures–Sojasun
- 2013: Cofidis

Cyril Bessy (born 29 May 1986) is a French former professional road cyclist.

== Major results ==
2007
1st Overall Tour de la Creuse

1st Prologue (TTT)

2008
1st Classique Paris-Chambord-Vailly
1st Stage 1 Tour des Pays de Savoie
2nd Grand Prix de la ville de Nogent-sur-Oise
3rd French National Time Trial Championships U23
2009
1st Classic Loire Atlantique
1st Prologue (TTT) Tour Alsace
2010
1st Prologue (TTT) & Stage 1 Tour Alsace
3rd Paris–Troyes
6th GP Llodio
2012
2nd Paris–Camembert

=== Grand Tour general classification results timeline ===
Grand Tour	2013
Giro d'Italia	—
Tour de France	—
Vuelta a España	DNF

Legend
—	Did not compete
DNF	Did not finish
