= 1999 Grand Prix de Denain =

Race details
- Dates: 22 April 1999
- Stages: 1
- Distance: 189 km (117 mi)
- Winning time: 4h 28' 00"

Results
	Winner	Jeroen Blijlevens (NED)
	Second	Jaan Kirsipuu (EST)
	Third	Nico Eeckhout (BEL)

The 1999 Grand Prix de Denain was the 41st edition of the Grand Prix de Denain cycle race and was held on 22 April 1999. The race started and finished in Denain. The race was won by Jeroen Blijlevens.

== General classification ==
Final general classification

Rank	Rider	Time
1	Jeroen Blijlevens (NED)	4h 28' 00"
2	Jaan Kirsipuu (EST)	+ 0"
3	Nico Eeckhout (BEL)	+ 0"
4	Stéphane Barthe (FRA)	+ 0"
5	Ludovic Capelle (BEL)	+ 0"
6	Damien Nazon (FRA)	+ 0"
7	Franky Van Haesebroucke (BEL)	+ 0"
8	Sébastien Hinault (FRA)	+ 0"
9	Lars Michaelsen (DEN)	+ 0"
10	Fabiano Fontanelli (ITA)	+ 0"
