= 2003 Dwars door Vlaanderen =

Race details
- Dates: 26 March 2003
- Stages: 1
- Distance: 200 km (124.3 mi)
- Winning time: 4h 59' 00"

Results
	Winner	Robbie McEwen (AUS)
	Second	Baden Cooke (AUS)
	Third	Max van Heeswijk (NED)

The 2003 Dwars door Vlaanderen was the 58th edition of the Dwars door Vlaanderen cycle race and was held on 26 March 2003. The race started in Kortrijk and finished in Waregem. The race was won by Robbie McEwen.

== General classification ==
Final general classification

Rank	Rider	Time
1	Robbie McEwen (AUS)	4h 59' 00"
2	Baden Cooke (AUS)	+ 0"
3	Max van Heeswijk (NED)	+ 0"
4	Jo Planckaert (BEL)	+ 0"
5	Geert Verheyen (BEL)	+ 0"
6	Jaan Kirsipuu (EST)	+ 0"
7	Damien Nazon (FRA)	+ 0"
8	Alberto Vinale (ITA)	+ 0"
9	Frank Vandenbroucke (BEL)	+ 0"
10	Emmanuel Magnien (FRA)	+ 0"
