= Maxime Daniel =

French bicycle racer

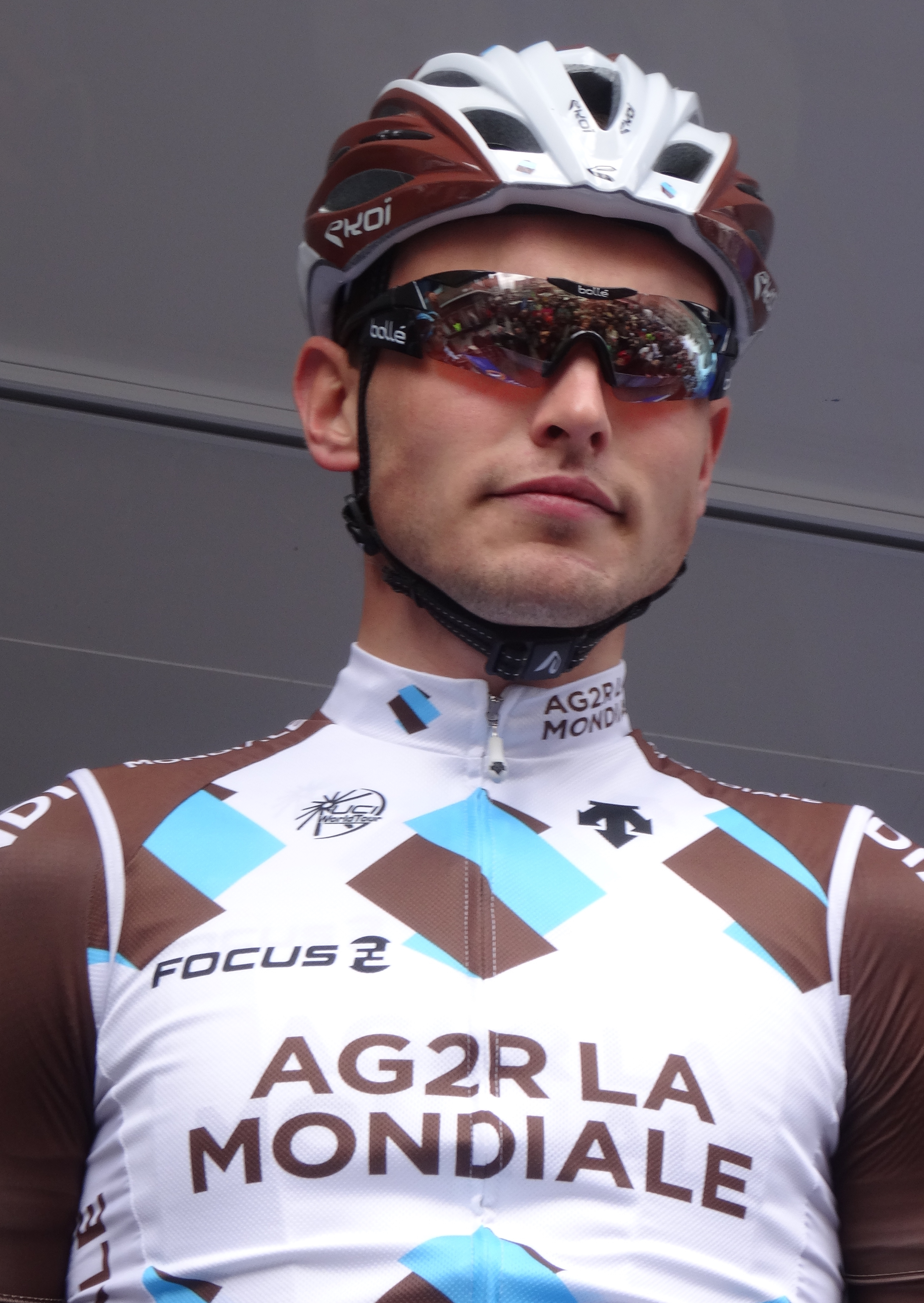
- Daniel at the 2014 Four Days of Dunkirk

Personal information
- Full name: Maxime Daniel
- Born: 5 June 1991 (age 35) Rennes, France
- Height: 1.86 m (6 ft 1 in)
- Weight: 74 kg (163 lb; 11.7 st)

Cycling career
- Sport: Cycling
- Current team: Retired
- Discipline: Road
- Role: Rider
- Rider type: Sprinter

Amateur teams
- 2009: VC Saint-Hilaire
- 2010–2012: Sojasun junior team

Professional teams
- 2010: Saur–Sojasun (stagiaire)
- 2011: Saur–Sojasun (stagiaire)
- 2013: Sojasun
- 2014–2016: Ag2r–La Mondiale
- 2017–2019: Fortuneo–Vital Concept

Maxime Daniel (born 5 June 1991 in Rennes) is a French former professional cyclist, who competed professionally between 2013 and 2019 for the Sojasun, AG2R La Mondiale and Arkéa–Samsic teams.

== Major results ==
2012
1st ZLM Tour
Boucle de l'Artois

1st Stages 2 & 3

5th Ronde Van Vlaanderen Beloften
2013
1st Stage 6 Volta a Portugal
9th Overall Tour de Picardie
9th Châteauroux Classic
2014
8th Overall Tour de Picardie
9th La Roue Tourangelle
9th Tour du Finistère
2017
4th Halle–Ingooigem
7th Grand Prix Pino Cerami
2019
1st Stage 3 Vuelta a la Comunidad de Madrid
