= 2008 Grand Prix de Denain =

Race details
- Dates: 17 April 2008
- Stages: 1
- Distance: 194.6 km (120.9 mi)
- Winning time: 4h 22' 59"

Results
	Winner	Edvald Boasson Hagen (NOR)
	Second	Jimmy Casper (FRA)
	Third	Jimmy Engoulvent (FRA)

The 2008 Grand Prix de Denain was the 50th edition of the Grand Prix de Denain cycle race and was held on 17 April 2008. The race started in Raismes and finished in Denain. The race was won by Edvald Boasson Hagen.

== General classification ==
Final general classification

Rank	Rider	Time
1	Edvald Boasson Hagen (NOR)	4h 22' 59"
2	Jimmy Casper (FRA)	+ 0"
3	Jimmy Engoulvent (FRA)	+ 0"
4	Frédéric Guesdon (FRA)	+ 0"
5	Paolo Longo Borghini (ITA)	+ 28"
6	Lilian Jégou (FRA)	+ 57"
7	Stefan van Dijk (NED)	+ 57"
8	Alexandre Blain (FRA)	+ 1' 01"
9	Stijn Vandenbergh (BEL)	+ 1' 05"
10	Olivier Bonnaire (FRA)	+ 1' 07"
