= 2006 Grand Prix de Denain =

Race details
- Dates: 13 April 2006
- Stages: 1
- Distance: 194.4 km (120.8 mi)
- Winning time: 4h 28' 42"

Results
	Winner	Jimmy Casper (FRA)
	Second	Nico Mattan (BEL)
	Third	Hans Dekkers (NED)

The 2006 Grand Prix de Denain was the 48th edition of the Grand Prix de Denain cycle race and was held on 13 April 2006. The race was won by Jimmy Casper.

== General classification ==
Final general classification

Rank	Rider	Time
1	Jimmy Casper (FRA)	4h 28' 42"
2	Nico Mattan (BEL)	+ 0"
3	Hans Dekkers (NED)	+ 0"
4	Erki Pütsep (EST)	+ 5"
5	Lloyd Mondory (FRA)	+ 5"
6	Carlo Scognamiglio (ITA)	+ 5"
7	William Bonnet (FRA)	+ 5"
8	Steven Caethoven (BEL)	+ 5"
9	Lilian Jégou (FRA)	+ 5"
10	Jean-Luc Delpech (FRA)	+ 5"
