= 2003 Grand Prix de Denain =

Race details
- Dates: 17 April 2003
- Stages: 1
- Distance: 196 km (121.8 mi)
- Winning time: 4h 30' 39"

Results
	Winner	Bert Roesems (BEL)
	Second	Enrico Poitschke (GER)
	Third	Thomas Voeckler (FRA)

The 2003 Grand Prix de Denain was the 45th edition of the Grand Prix de Denain cycle race and was held on 17 April 2003. The race was won by Bert Roesems.

== General classification ==
Final general classification

Rank	Rider	Time
1	Bert Roesems (BEL)	4h 30' 39"
2	Enrico Poitschke (GER)	+ 0"
3	Thomas Voeckler (FRA)	+ 0"
4	Pierre Bourquenoud (SUI)	+ 7"
5	Frédéric Guesdon (FRA)	+ 18"
6	Jimmy Engoulvent (FRA)	+ 31"
7	Jérôme Pineau (FRA)	+ 34"
8	Christophe Edaleine (FRA)	+ 34"
9	Carlos Da Cruz (FRA)	+ 40"
10	Anthony Geslin (FRA)	+ 40"
