= 2005 Grand Prix de Denain =

Race details
- Dates: 14 April 2005
- Stages: 1
- Distance: 199 km (123.7 mi)
- Winning time: 4h 29' 27"

Results
	Winner	Jimmy Casper (FRA)
	Second	Mark Renshaw (AUS)
	Third	Lloyd Mondory (FRA)

The 2005 Grand Prix de Denain was the 47th edition of the Grand Prix de Denain cycle race and was held on 14 April 2005. The race was won by Jimmy Casper.

== General classification ==
Final general classification

Rank	Rider	Time
1	Jimmy Casper (FRA)	4h 29' 27"
2	Mark Renshaw (AUS)	+ 0"
3	Lloyd Mondory (FRA)	+ 0"
4	Roman Luhovyy (UKR)	+ 0"
5	Stefan Adamsson (SWE)	+ 0"
6	Yuriy Krivtsov (UKR)	+ 0"
7	Saïd Haddou (FRA)	+ 0"
8	Jaroslaw Zarebski (POL)	+ 0"
9	William Bonnet (FRA)	+ 0"
10	Remco van der Ven (NED)	+ 0"
