= Paul Poux =

French cyclist

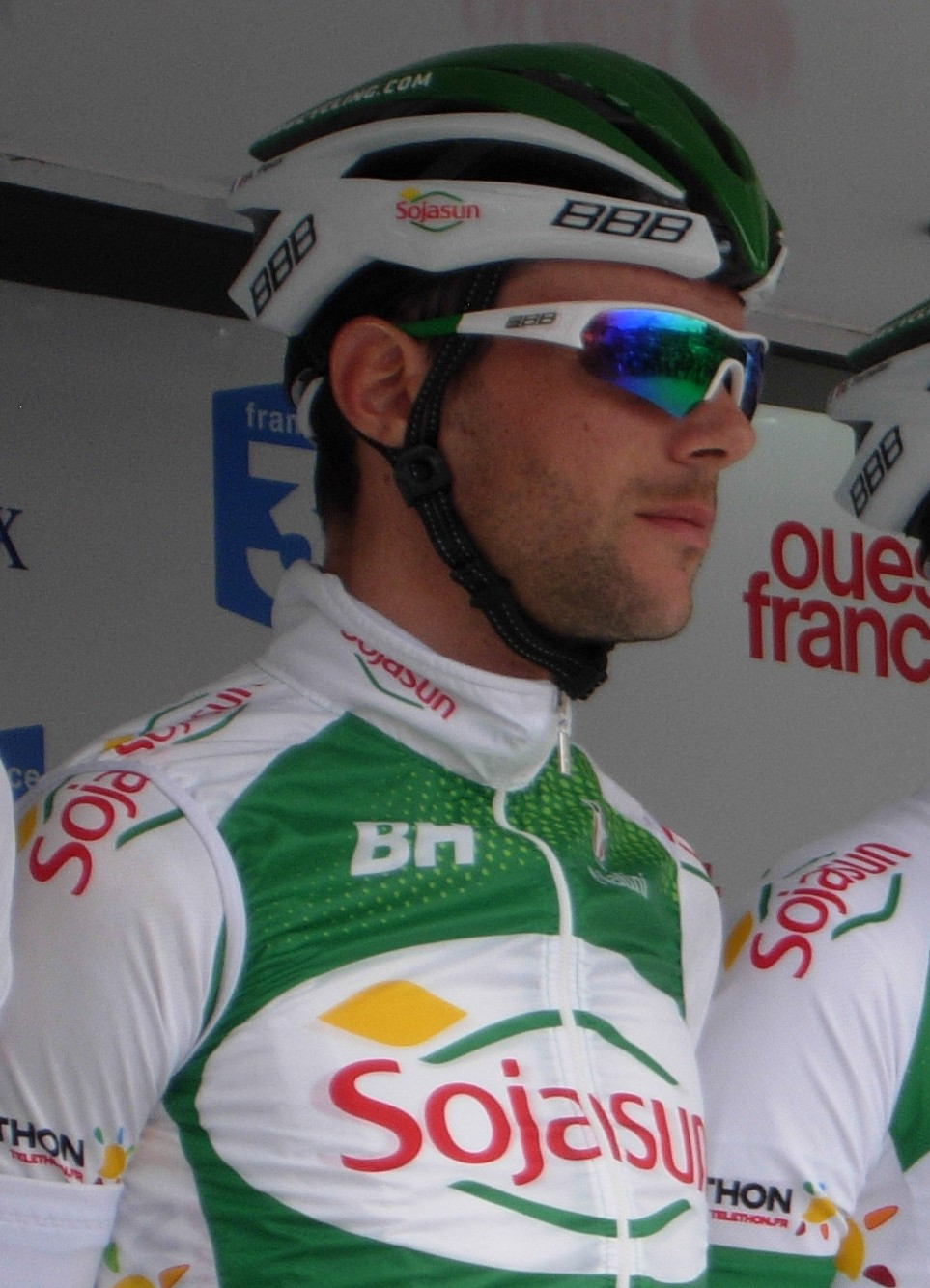
- Poux in 2013

Personal information
- Born: 9 July 1984 (age 42) Angoulême, France
- Height: 1.81 m (5 ft 11 in)
- Weight: 70 kg (154 lb)

Cycling career
- Sport: Cycling
- Current team: Retired
- Discipline: Road
- Role: Rider

Amateur team
- 2010: Sojasun U23–ACNC

Professional teams
- 2010: Saur–Sojasun (stagiaire)
- 2011–2013: Saur–Sojasun

Paul Poux (born 9 July 1984 in Angoulême) is a French former professional road cyclist, who competed for Saur–Sojasun from 2011 to 2013.

When Sojasun folded after the 2013 season, Poux could not find a team for the 2014 season and ended his career.

== Major results ==
2009
1st Grand Prix du Pays d'Aix
2010
1st Souvenir Louison-Bobet
1st Stage 3 (ITT) Circuit des Ardennes
5th Chrono Champenois
9th Overall Tour du Gévaudan Languedoc-Roussillon
10th Chrono des Herbiers
2011
1st Stage 4 Tour de Bretagne
5th Duo Normand
8th Overall Tour du Poitou-Charentes
2012
1st Overall Rhône-Alpes Isère Tour

1st Stage 1

1st Prologue Boucles de la Mayenne
