= Roman Luhovyy =

Ukrainian cyclist

Personal information
- Full name: Roman Ivanovych Luhovyy
- Born: 4 August 1979 (age 47) Kropyvnytskyi, Ukraine

Cycling career
- Sport: Cycling
- Current team: Retired
- Discipline: Road
- Role: Rider

Amateur teams
- 1998–1999: Girardengo–Alplast
- 2000: Alplast–Città del Ciclismo–Olmo
- 2001–2002: San Paolo Saeco–Colzi–Pratesi
- 2003: Olio Vezza–Brunero

Professional teams
- 2002: Team Colpack–Astro (stagiaire)
- 2004–2005: R.A.G.T. Semences–MG Rover
- 2006: OTC Doors–Lauretana
Medal record
Representing Ukraine
Men's road bicycle racing
European Championships
Bronze medal – third place	2001 Apremont	Under-23 road race

Roman Ivanovych Luhovyy (Ukrainian: Роман Іванович Луговий; born 4 August 1979) is a Ukrainian former cyclist, who competed as a professional from 2004 to 2006.

== Major results ==
1995
1st Road race, European Youth Summer Olympic Days
1999
9th Gran Premio della Liberazione
2001
1st Stage 6a Giro delle Regioni
3rd Road race, UEC European Under-23 Road Championships
4th Gran Premio della Liberazione
2002
1st Trofeo Edil C
1st Firenze-Empoli
1st Menton–Savona
1st Coppa Collecchio
1st Stage 8 Rutas de América
2003
2nd Trofeo Edil C
3rd GP Industrie del Marmo
2004
6th GP de la Ville de Rennes
8th Grand Prix Pino Cerami
2005
2nd Road race, National Road Championships
4th Grand Prix de Denain
5th Classic Loire Atlantique
