= Jean-Lou Paiani =

French cyclist

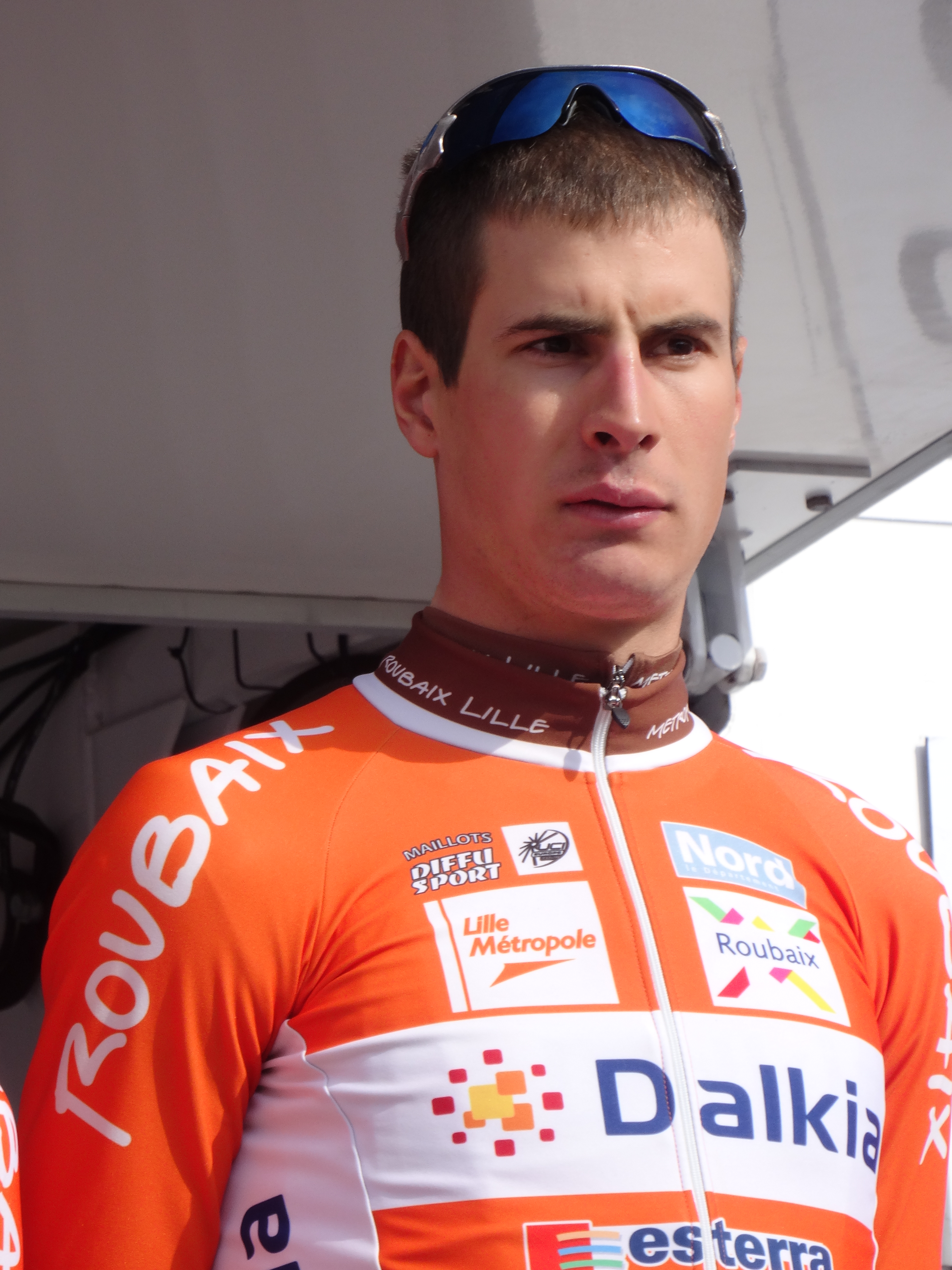

Personal information
- Born: 13 December 1988 (age 37) Sallanches, France

Cycling career
- Sport: Cycling
- Discipline: Road
- Role: Rider

Amateur teams
- 2009: VC LyonVaulx-en-Velin
- 2010: Sojasun espoir

Professional teams
- 2011–2013: Saur–Sojasun
- 2014: Roubaix–Lille Métropole

Jean-Lou Paiani (born 13 December 1988 in Sallanches) is a French cyclist from Megève, Rhône-Alpes, France.

== Palmares ==
2009
1st Stage 2 Tour de l'Avenir
1st Stage 2 Tour Nivernais Morvan
6th Paris–Roubaix Espoirs
2012
2nd Grand Prix de la Ville de Lillers
2014
1st Stage 1 Paris-Arras Tour (TTT)
