= Sojasun (cycling team) =

Team information
- UCI code: SOJ
- Registered: France
- Founded: 2009
- Disbanded: 2013
- Discipline: Road
- Status: UCI Professional Continental
- Bicycles: BH Bikes
- Website: Team home page

Key personnel
- General manager: Stéphane Heulot

Team name history
- 2009 2010–2012 2013: Besson Chaussures-Sojasun; Saur-Sojasun (SAU); Sojasun (SOJ)
Sojasun jersey
Jersey

Sojasun was a French cycling team registered at UCI Professional Continental level. They were founded in 2009 as Besson Chaussures-Sojasun. The team rode BH bicycles. Their sponsor Sojasun is a company which manufactures soya-based foods.

In 2012, the team received a wildcard invitation to the Tour de France, along with three other French-registered teams.

The professional cycling team Sojasun will not be present in the professional peloton in 2014, after the team was unable to find a new title sponsor.

== Final team roster ==
As of 1 January 2013.

Rider	Date of birth
Maxime Daniel (FRA)	5 June 1991 (age 35)
Anthony Delaplace (FRA)	11 September 1989 (age 36)
Julien El Fares (FRA)	1 June 1985 (age 41)
Jimmy Engoulvent (FRA)	7 December 1979 (age 46)
Brice Feillu (FRA)	26 July 1985 (age 41)
Jérémie Galland (FRA)	8 April 1983 (age 43)
Jonathan Hivert (FRA)	23 March 1985 (age 41)
Fabrice Jeandesboz (FRA)	4 December 1984 (age 41)
Christophe Laborie (FRA)	5 August 1986 (age 40)
David Lelay (FRA)	30 December 1979 (age 46)
Cyril Lemoine (FRA)	3 March 1983 (age 43)
Jean-Marc Marino (FRA)	15 August 1983 (age 43)

Rider	Date of birth
Rony Martias (FRA)	4 August 1980 (age 46)
Maxime Mederel (FRA)	19 September 1980 (age 45)
Jean-Lou Paiani (FRA)	23 December 1988 (age 37)
Rémi Pauriol (FRA)	4 April 1982 (age 44)
Paul Poux (FRA)	7 September 1984 (age 41)
Fabien Schmidt (FRA)	23 March 1989 (age 37)
Julien Simon (FRA)	4 October 1985 (age 40)
Evaldas Šiškevičius (LTU)	30 December 1988 (age 37)
Yannick Talabardon (FRA)	6 July 1981 (age 45)
Etienne Tortelier (FRA)	14 April 1990 (age 36)
Alexis Vuillermoz (FRA)	1 June 1988 (age 38)

== Major wins ==
2009
Stage 1 & 2 Étoile de Bessèges, Jimmy Casper
Stage 2 3 Jours de Vaucluse, Jimmy Engoulvent
Paris–Troyes, Yannick Talabardon
Classic Loire Atlantique, Cyril Bessy
Stage 1 Critérium International, Jimmy Casper
Stage 3 Circuit de la Sarthe, Jimmy Engoulvent
Paris–Camembert, Jimmy Casper
Grand Prix de Denain, Jimmy Casper
Stage 3 Tour de Bretagne, Laurent Mangel
Stage 5 Tour de Bretagne, Jimmy Engoulvent
Stage 2 Four Days of Dunkirk, Jimmy Engoulvent
Grand Prix de Plumelec-Morbihan, Jérémie Galland
Stage 2 Tour de Gironde, Jimmy Casper
Stage 4 Tour de Gironde, Jimmy Engoulvent
Stage 1 Ronde de l'Oise, Jimmy Casper
Stage 3 Circuito Montañés, Jimmy Engoulvent
Stage 1 Boucles de la Mayenne, Jimmy Casper
Stage 4 Tour Alsace, Jimmy Engoulvent
Stage 2 Tour du Poitou-Charentes, Jimmy Casper
Châteauroux Classic, Jimmy Casper
Stage 2 Tour du Gévaudan, Laurent Mangel
2010
GP d'Ouverture, Jonathan Hivert
Stage 1 Tour of Oman, Jimmy Casper
Classic Loire Atlantique, Laurent Mangel
Stage 4 Tour de Normandie, Jimmy Casper
Overall Rhône-Alpes Isère Tour, Jérôme Coppel

Stage 1, Jérôme Coppel

Stage 3 Tour de Picardie, Jimmy Casper
Stage 3 Tour of Belgium, Jimmy Casper
Prologue Tour de Luxembourg, Jimmy Engoulvent
Val d'Ille U Classic 35, Jimmy Casper
Overall Boucles de la Mayenne, Jérémie Galland

Prologue, Jimmy Engoulvent
Stage 1, Laurent Mangel

Stage 4 Tour de Wallonie, Laurent Mangel
Stage 1 Tour Alsace, Cyril Bessy
Prologue Volta a Portugal, Jimmy Engoulvent
Stage 3 Volta a Portugal, Jimmy Casper
Stage 1 Tour de l'Ain, Stéphane Poulhiès
Stage 1 Tour du Limousin, Jérémie Galland
Overall Tour du Poitou-Charentes, Jimmy Engoulvent

Stage 3, Jimmy Engoulvent
Stage 5, Jimmy Casper

Tour du Doubs, Jérôme Coppel
Overall Tour du Gévaudan, Jérôme Coppel

Stage 1, Guillaume Levarlet
Stage 2, Jérôme Coppel

2012
Overall Étoile de Bessèges, Jérôme Coppel

Stage 5a, Stéphane Poulhies
Stage 5b, Jérôme Coppel

Stages 5 & 7 Volta a Catalunya, Julien Simon
Tour du Finistère, Julien Simon
Stage 2 Tour de Romandie, Jonathan Hivert
Overall Four Days of Dunkirk, Jimmy Engoulvent

Stage 3, Jimmy Engoulvent

Overall Rhône-Alpes Isère Tour, Paul Poux

Stage 1, Paul Poux

Grand Prix de Plumelec-Morbihan, Julien Simon
Prologue Tour de Luxembourg, Jimmy Engoulvent
Stage 1 Route du Sud, Stéphane Poulhies
Prologue Boucles de la Mayenne, Paul Poux
Tour du Doubs, Jérôme Coppel
Grand Prix de Wallonie, Julien Simon
2013
Overall Étoile de Bessèges, Jonathan Hivert
Stages 1 & 2 Vuelta a Andalucía, Jonathan Hivert
Prologue Tour de Luxembourg, Jimmy Engoulvent
Stage 6 Volta a Portugal, Maxime Daniel
