= Alberto Vinale =

Italian former road cyclist

Personal information
- Born: 5 June 1978 (age 48) San Donà di Piave, Italy

Cycling career
- Sport: Cycling
- Current team: Retired
- Discipline: Road
- Role: Rider

Professional team
- 2000–2003: Alessio

Major wins
- One-day races and Classics Grand Prix de Denain (2002)

Alberto Vinale (born 5 June 1978 in San Donà di Piave) is an Italian former road cyclist. He was professional from 2000 to 2003 with the Italian team Alessio. He won the 2002 Grand Prix de Denain, which was his only professional victory.

== Major results ==
2002
1st Grand Prix de Denain
2003
8th Dwars door Vlaanderen

=== Grand Tour general classification results timeline ===
Grand Tour	2001	2002	2003
Giro d'Italia	—	—	—
Tour de France	—	—	—
Vuelta a España	151	128	127

Legend
—	Did not compete
DNF	Did not finish
