= 2016 Grand Prix de Denain =

Race details
- Dates: 14 April 2016
- Stages: 1
- Distance: 199.6 km (124.0 mi)
- Winning time: 4h 29' 23"

Results
	Winner	Daniel McLay (GBR)
	Second	Thomas Boudat (FRA)
	Third	Kenny Dehaes (BEL)

The 2016 Grand Prix de Denain was the 58th edition of the Grand Prix de Denain cycle race and was held on 14 April 2016. The race started and finished in Denain. The race was won by Daniel McLay.

== General classification ==
Final general classification

Rank	Rider	Time
1	Daniel McLay (GBR)	4h 29' 23"
2	Thomas Boudat (FRA)	+ 0"
3	Kenny Dehaes (BEL)	+ 0"
4	Baptiste Planckaert (BEL)	+ 0"
5	Lorrenzo Manzin (FRA)	+ 0"
6	Clément Venturini (FRA)	+ 0"
7	Paweł Franczak (POL)	+ 0"
8	Chris Opie (GBR)	+ 0"
9	Bryan Alaphilippe (FRA)	+ 0"
10	Loïc Chetout (FRA)	+ 0"
