= Ronde Pévéloise =

French cycling competition (2010–2014)

Ronde Pévèloise
Race details
- Date: July
- Region: Nord Department, France
- Discipline: Road race
- Competition: UCI Europe Tour
- Type: One day race

History
- First edition: 2010
- Editions: 5
- Final edition: 2014
- First winner: Frank Dressler-Lehnhof (GER)
- Most wins: Benoît Daeninck (FRA) (3 wins)
- Final winner: Benoît Daeninck (FRA)

The G.P. de Pont à Marcq-La Ronde Pévèloise was a road bicycle race held annually in France from 2010 to 2014. It was organized as a 1.2 event on the UCI Europe Tour.

== Winners ==
Year	Country	Rider	Team
2010	Germany	Frank Dressler-Lehnhof	Continental Team Differdange
2011	France	Arnaud Démare	CC Nogent-sur-Oise
2012	France	Benoît Daeninck	CC Nogent-sur-Oise
2013	France	Benoît Daeninck	CC Nogent-sur-Oise
2014	France	Benoît Daeninck	CC Nogent-sur-Oise
