= 2015 Grand Prix de Denain =

2015 UCI Europe Tour

Race details
- Dates: 16 April 2015
- Distance: 198.3 km (123.2 mi)
- Winning time: 4h 29' 25"

Results
	Winner	Nacer Bouhanni (FRA)	(Cofidis)
	Second	Boris Vallée (BEL)	(Lotto–Soudal)
	Third	Rudy Barbier (FRA)	(Roubaix–Lille Métropole)

The 2015 Grand Prix de Denain was the 57th edition of the Grand Prix de Denain cycle race and was held on 16 April 2015. The race started and finished in Denain, and was won by Nacer Bouhanni.

== Results ==
Rank	Rider	Team	Time
1	Nacer Bouhanni (FRA)	Cofidis	4h 29' 25"
2	Boris Vallée (BEL)	Lotto–Soudal	+ 0"
3	Rudy Barbier (FRA)	Roubaix–Lille Métropole	+ 0"
4	Raymond Kreder (NED)	Team Roompot	+ 0"
5	Samuel Dumoulin (FRA)	AG2R La Mondiale	+ 0"
6	Alexis Bodiot (FRA)	Armée de Terre	+ 0"
7	Nicola Ruffoni (ITA)	Bardiani–CSF	+ 0"
8	Lorrenzo Manzin (FRA)	FDJ	+ 0"
9	Timothy Dupont (BEL)	Roubaix–Lille Métropole	+ 0"
10	Bryan Coquard (FRA)	Team Europcar	+ 0"
