= Sojasun =

French company selling soy-based products

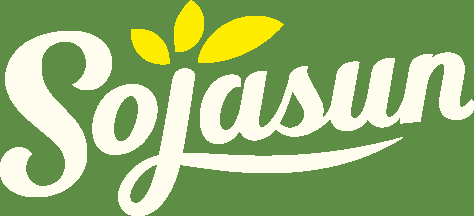

Sojasun is a Brittany-based French company created in 1988 that sells soy-based products. The soy is 100% produced in France. The company is part of the Olga company, which was founded in 1874.

== Production ==
The Sojasun production plant is located in Châteaubourg.' The products are distributed in major retail chains across France.

The brand has about 50 different soja products across five categories. About 17% of French people buy its products.

== Sponsorship ==
After co-sponsoring the cycling team alongside the Saur group since 2010, Sojasun became the primary sponsor of the Sojasun cycling team in 2013.

The brand also supports athletes in various disciplines, including sailing, canoeing, and para table tennis.
