= Frank Dressler-Lehnhof =

German cyclist

Personal information
- Full name: Frank Dressler-Lehnhof
- Born: 30 September 1976 (age 50) Landstuhl, Germany

Cycling career
- Sport: Cycling
- Current team: Retired
- Discipline: Road
- Role: Rider

Professional teams
- 2003–2005: ComNet–Senges
- 2006–2007: Continental Team Differdange
- 2008: Mitsubishi–Jartazi
- 2009–2013: Differdange–Losch

Frank Dressler-Lehnhof (born 30 September 1976) is a German former professional road cyclist.

== Major results ==
2002
2nd Romsée–Stavelot–Romsée
4th Internationale Wielertrofee Jong Maar Moedig
2006
6th Grand Prix Möbel Alvisse
2007
2nd Internationale Wielertrofee Jong Maar Moedig
4th Overall La Tropicale Amissa Bongo
6th Grand Prix de la ville de Pérenchies
9th Overall Tour de Korea
10th Grand Prix de Beuvry-la-Forêt
2009
3rd Grand Prix de la ville de Pérenchies
4th Tartu Grand Prix
8th Tallinn–Tartu Grand Prix
2010
1st Ronde Pévéloise
