= Grand Prix de Denain =

French one-day road cycling race

Race details
- Date: Late-April
- Region: Denain, France
- English name: Grand Prix of Denain
- Local name: Grand Prix de Denain (in French)
- Discipline: Road
- Competition: UCI ProSeries
- Type: Single-day
- Web site: gpdenain.fr

History
- First edition: 1959
- Editions: 67 (as of 2026)
- First winner: Seamus Elliott (IRL)
- Most wins: Jimmy Casper (FRA) (4 wins)
- Most recent: Alec Segaert (BEL)

Grand Prix de Denain is a professional cycle road race held in Denain, France. For 10 years from 2005 the race was organized as a 1.1 event on the UCI Europe Tour, before becoming a 1.HC event for the 2016 season. In 2020, the race joined the UCI ProSeries. It is also part of the French Road Cycling Cup.

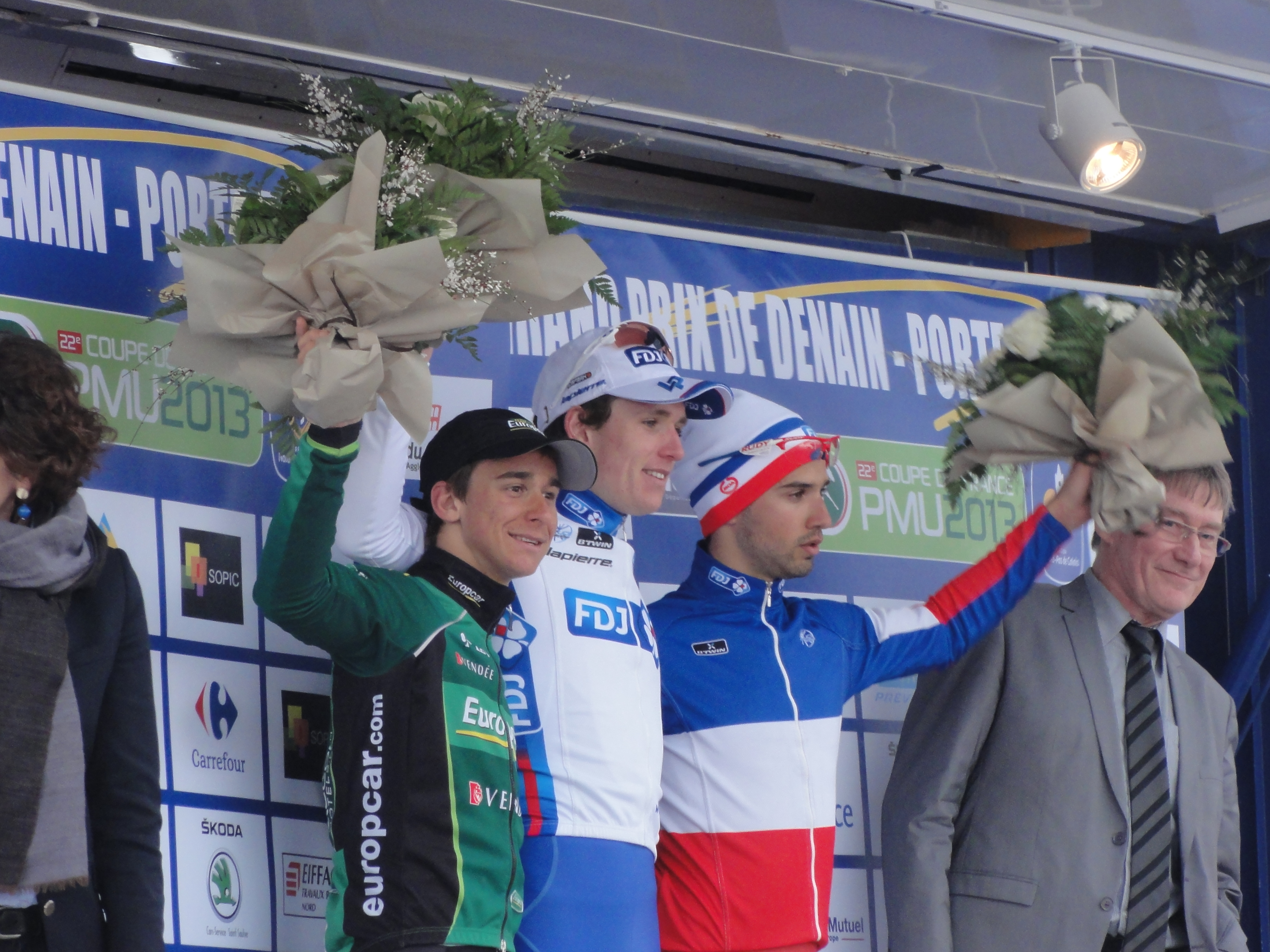
2013: Bryan Coquard, Arnaud Démare & Nacer Bouhanni.

== Winners ==
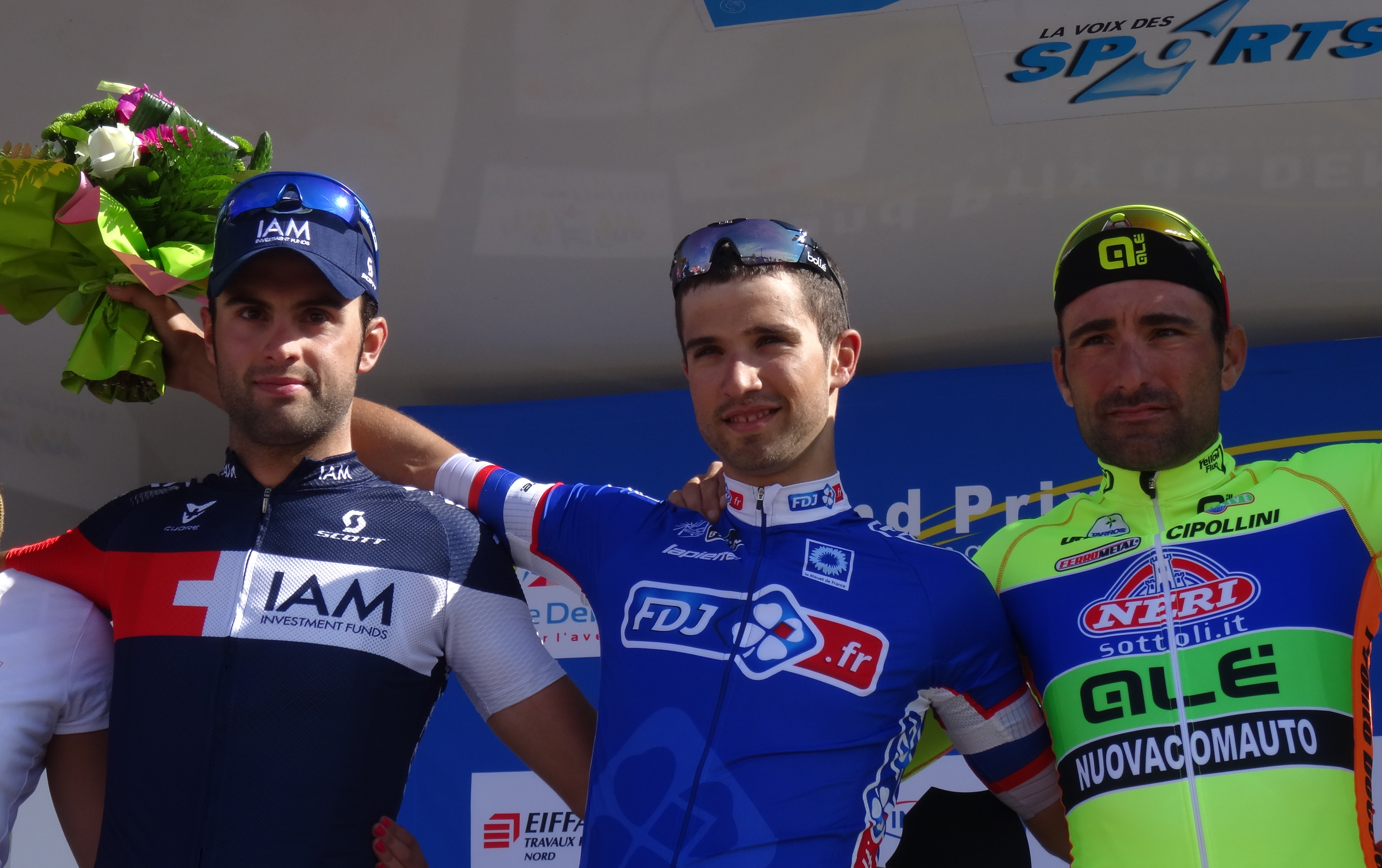
2014: Matteo Pelucchi (2), Nacer Bouhanni (1), Francesco Chicchi (3).

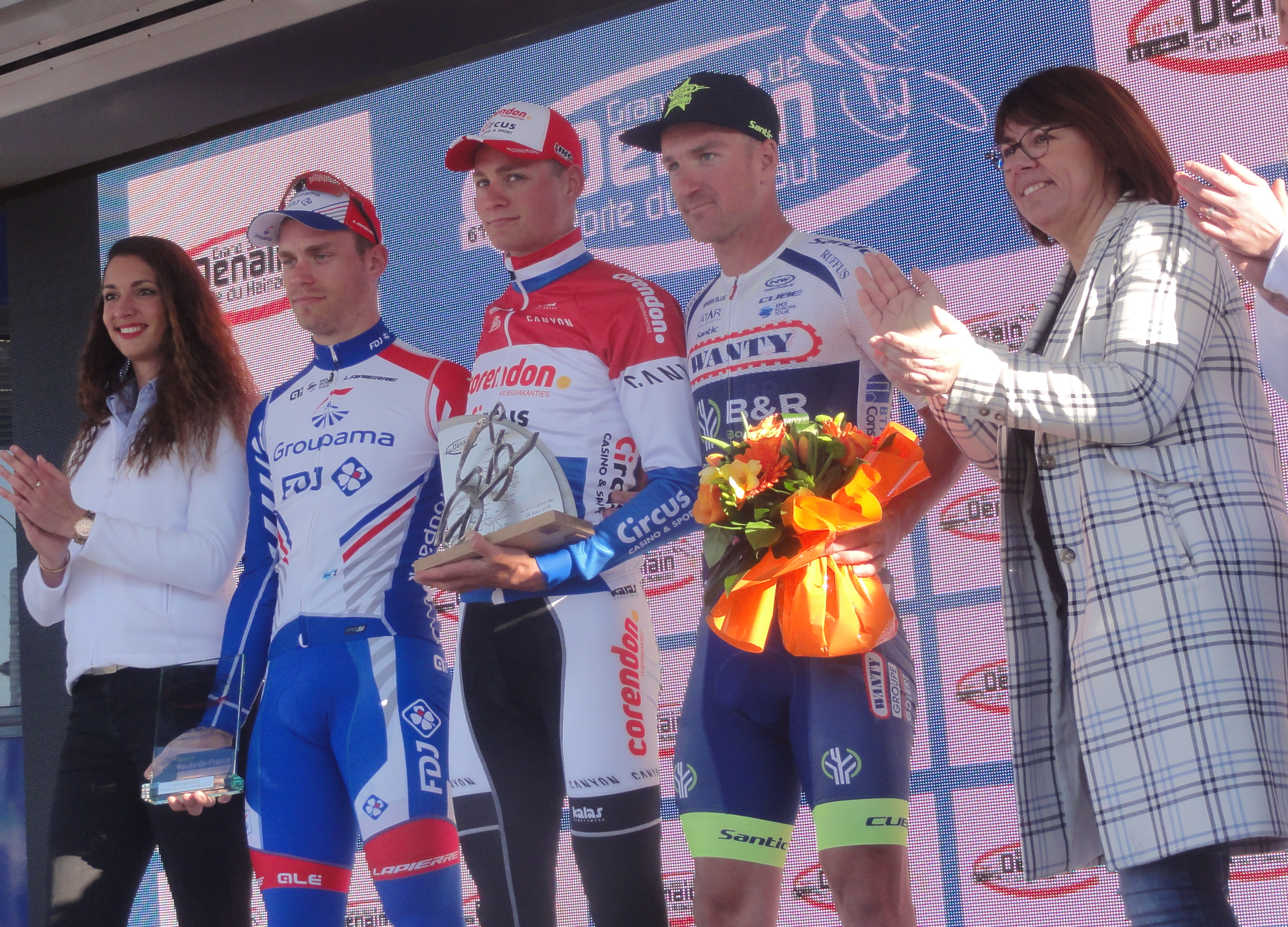
2019 Grand Prix de Denain: Marc Sarreau, winner Mathieu van der Poel and Timothy Dupont

Year	Country	Rider	Team
1959	Ireland	Seamus Elliot	Helyett–Fynsec
1960	Belgium	Gabriel Borra	Helyett–Fynsec–Leroux
1961	Belgium	Arthur Decabooter	Groene Leeuw–SAS–Sinalco
1962	Belgium	Julien Schepens	Bertin–Porter 39–Milremo
1963	Belgium	Gustaaf De Smet	Wiel's–Groene Leeuw
1964	Great Britain	Michael Wright	Wiel's–Groene Leeuw
1965	Belgium	Ludo Janssens	Pelforth–Sauvage–Lejeune
1966	Belgium	Herman Vrancken	Mann–Grundig
1967	France	José Samyn	Pelforth–Sauvage–Lejeune
1968	France	Jean Stablinski	Mercier–BP–Hutchinson
1969	Belgium	Joseph Mathy	Frimatic–Viva–de Gribaldy
1970	Belgium	Christian Callens	Mann–Grundig
1971	Belgium	André Dierickx	Watneys–Avia
1972	Belgium	Gustaaf Van Roosbroeck	Watneys–Avia
1973	Belgium	Marc Demeyer	Flandria–Carpenter–Shimano
1974	Belgium	Willy Teirlinck	Sonolor–Gitane
1975	Belgium	Roger Loysch	IJsboerke–Colner
1976	Belgium	Walter Planckaert	Maes–Rokado
1977	France	Robert Mintkiewicz	Gitane–Campagnolo
1978	Belgium	Frank Hoste	IJsboerke–Gios
1979	France	Jean-Philippe Pipart	La Redoute–Motobécane
1980	Belgium	Leo Van Thielen	Eurobouw
1981	Belgium	Ferdi Van Den Haute	La Redoute–Motobécane
1982	Belgium	Eddy Van Harens	Safir–Marc
1983	Great Britain	Paul Sherwen	La Redoute–Motobécane
1984	Belgium	Yves Godimus	Fangio–Ecoturbo
1985	Belgium	Patrick Versluys	Hitachi–Splendor
1986	France	Bruno Wojtinek	Peugeot–Shell–Velo Talbot
1987	France	Bruno Wojtinek	Z–Peugeot
1988	France	Pascal Poisson	Toshiba
1989	Belgium	Edwig Van Hooydonck	Superconfex–Yoko–Opel–Colnago
1990	France	Frédéric Moncassin	Castorama
1991	France	Frédéric Moncassin	Castorama
1992	Belgium	Edwig Van Hooydonck	Buckler–Colnago–Decca
1993	Germany	Marcel Wüst	Novemail–Histor–Laser Computer
1994	Netherlands	Jans Koerts	Festina–Lotus
1995	Belgium	Jo Planckaert	Collstrop–Lystex
1996	Czech Republic	Ján Svorada	Panaria–Vinavil
1997	Belgium	Ludo Dierckxsens	Tönissteiner–Colnago
1998	Estonia	Jaan Kirsipuu	Casino–Ag2r
1999	Netherlands	Jeroen Blijlevens	TVM–Farm Frites
2000	Italy	Endrio Leoni	Alessio
2001	Estonia	Jaan Kirsipuu	AG2R Prévoyance
2002	Italy	Alberto Vinale	Alessio
2003	Belgium	Bert Roesems	Palmans–Collstrop
2004	Norway	Thor Hushovd	Crédit Agricole
2005	France	Jimmy Casper	Cofidis
2006	France	Jimmy Casper	Cofidis
2007	France	Sébastien Chavanel	Française des Jeux
2008	Norway	Edvald Boasson Hagen	Team High Road
2009	France	Jimmy Casper	Besson Chaussures–Sojasun
2010	France	Denis Flahaut	ISD Continental Team
2011	France	Jimmy Casper	Saur–Sojasun
2012	Argentina	Juan José Haedo	Team Saxo Bank
2013	France	Arnaud Démare	FDJ
2014	France	Nacer Bouhanni	FDJ.fr
2015	France	Nacer Bouhanni	Cofidis
2016	Great Britain	Daniel McLay	Fortuneo–Vital Concept
2017	France	Arnaud Démare	FDJ
2018	Belgium	Kenny Dehaes	WB Aqua Protect Veranclassic
2019	Netherlands	Mathieu van der Poel	Corendon–Circus
2020	No race due to the COVID-19 pandemic		
2021	Belgium	Jasper Philipsen	Alpecin–Fenix
2022	Germany	Max Walscheid	Cofidis
2023	Colombia	Juan Sebastián Molano	UAE Team Emirates
2024	Germany	Jannik Steimle	Q36.5 Pro Cycling Team
2025	Great Britain	Matthew Brennan	Visma–Lease a Bike
2026	Belgium	Alec Segaert	Team Bahrain Victorious

=== Wins per country ===
Wins	Country
28	Belgium
19	France
4	Great Britain
3	Germany; Netherlands
2	Estonia; Italy; Norway
1	Argentina; Colombia; Czech Republic; Ireland
