= Fabien Bacquet =

French cyclist (born 1986)

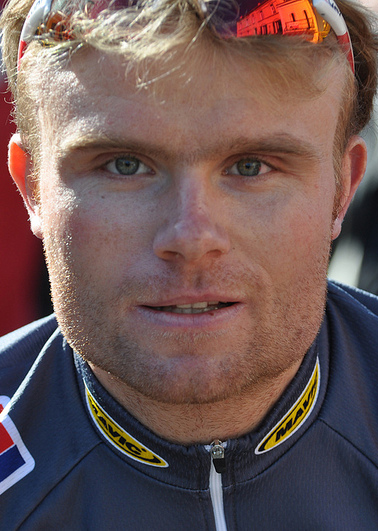
- Bacquet at the 2013 Tour du Haut-Var

Personal information
- Born: 28 February 1986 (age 40) Soissons, France

Cycling career
- Sport: Cycling
- Current team: Retired
- Discipline: Road
- Role: Rider
- Rider type: Sprinter

Amateur team
- 2005–2006: CC Nogent-sur-Oise

Professional teams
- 2007–2008: Skil–Shimano
- 2009–2013: Auber 93
- 2014: Veranclassic–Doltcini (until 14 May)

Fabien Bacquet (born 28 February 1986 in Soissons) is a French former professional road cyclist.

== Major results ==
2004
3rd Route de l'Avenir
2008
6th Scheldeprijs
8th Nokere-Koerse
2009
1st Stage 4 Tour de Normandie
4th Grand Prix de la Ville de Nogent-sur-Oise
6th Grand Prix de Fourmies
7th GP de Denain
8th Grand Prix de la Somme
10th Grand Prix de la Ville de Lillers
2010
6th Grand Prix de la Ville de Lillers
10th Overall Boucles de la Mayenne
2011
1st Stages 4 & 6 Tour de Normandie
2nd Grand Prix de la Ville de Lillers
9th GP de Denain
10th Flèche d'Emeraude
9th Cholet-Pays de Loire
2012
3rd Grand Prix de Denain
5th Grand Prix de la ville de Pérenchies
6th Châteauroux Classic
7th Flèche d'Emeraude
2013
4th Route Adélie
7th Classic Loire Atlantique
