= Denis Flahaut =

French cyclist (born 1978)

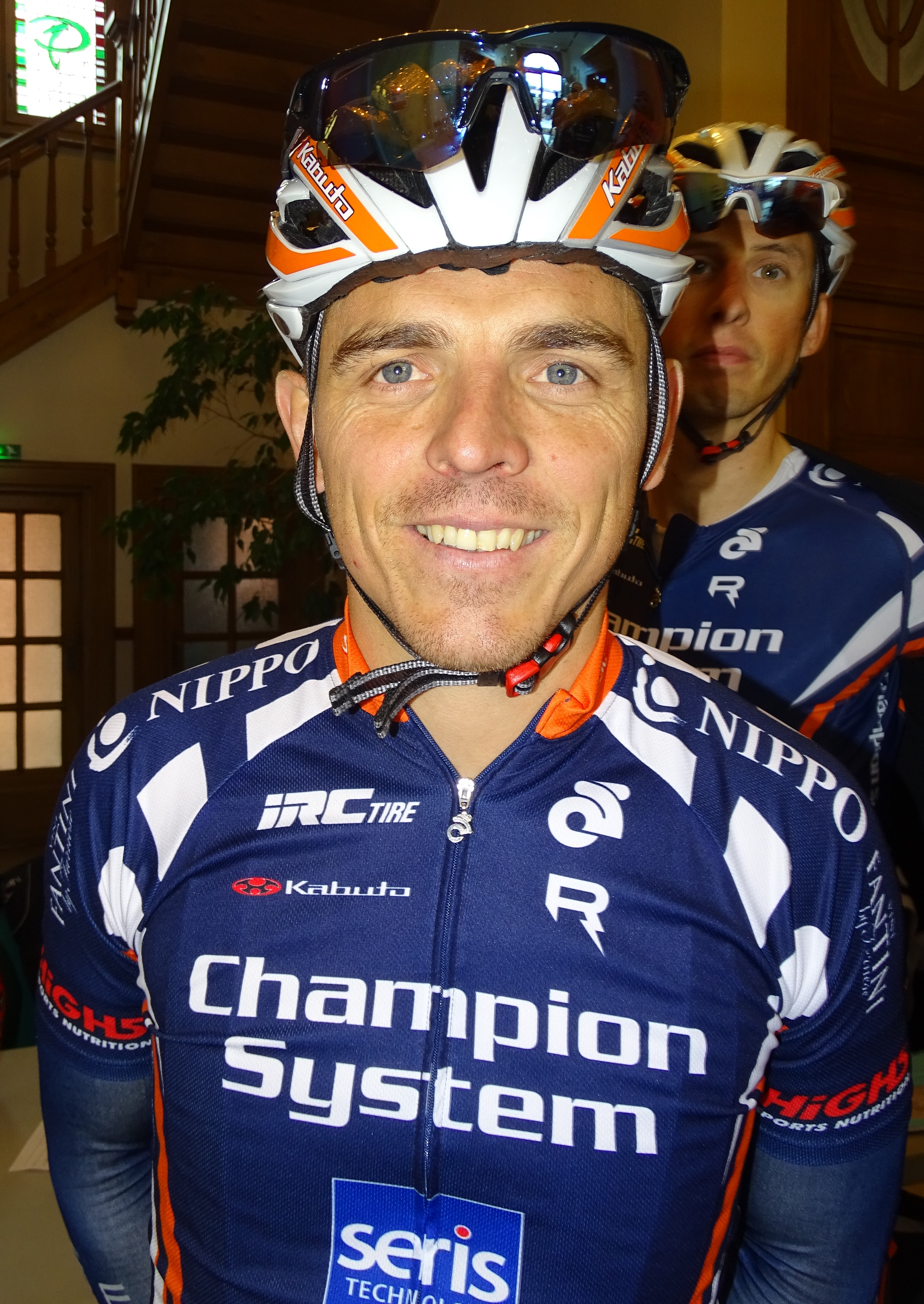
- Flahaut in 2015

Personal information
- Full name: Denis Flahaut
- Born: 28 November 1978 (age 47) Valenciennes, France

Cycling career
- Sport: Cycling
- Current team: Retired
- Discipline: Road
- Role: Rider

Amateur teams
- 2001: Supersport–23 La Creuse
- 2003: CM Aubervilliers
- 2004: La Porte Du Hainaut
- 2005: Mixte Raismes–Dunkerque
- 2006: Flanders
- 2007: Jartazi–Promo Fashion

Professional teams
- 2008: Saunier Duval–Scott
- 2009: Landbouwkrediet–Colnago
- 2010: ISD Continental Team
- 2011–2012: Roubaix–Lille Métropole
- 2013: Colba–Superano Ham
- 2014: Veranclassic–Doltcini
- 2015: CCT p/b Champion System

Major wins
- GP de Denain (2010)

Denis Flahaut (born 28 November 1978 in Valenciennes) is a French former professional road racing cyclist.

== Major results ==
2004
Tour du Faso

1st Stages 3, 8 & 10

6th GP de Dourges
2006
2nd Omloop van de Vlaamse Scheldeboorden
8th Nationale Sluitingprijs
8th Grand Prix de la Ville de Lillers
2007
1st Delta Profronde
1st Neuseen Classics
1st Vlaamse Havenpijl
1st Stage 3 OZ Wielerweekend
3rd Kampioenschap van Vlaanderen
6th Omloop van de Vlaamse Scheldeboorden
2008
1st Stage 5 Vuelta a Andalucía
2nd Trofeo Cala Millor
5th Trofeo Mallorca
2009
1st Meiprijs - Ereprijs Victor De Bruyne
1st Nationale Sluitingprijs - Putte - Kapellen
3rd GP de Denain Porte du Hainaut
3rd Antwerpse Havenpijl
6th Memorial Rik Van Steenbergen
7th Omloop van het Waasland
2010
1st GP de Denain
1st Omloop van het Waasland
1st Tallinn–Tartu GP
3rd Arno Wallaard Memorial
4th Beverbeek Classic
7th Omloop der Kempen
9th Ronde Pévéloise
2011
1st Grand Prix de la Ville de Lillers
3rd Ronde Pévéloise
5th GP de Denain
2012
1st Stage 1 Paris–Arras Tour
4th Road race, National Road Championships
7th GP de Denain
