= Flèche d'Emeraude =

Race details
- Date: Early April
- Region: Saint-Malo, France
- English name: Emerald Arrow
- Local name: Flèche d'Emeraude (in French)
- Discipline: Road race
- Competition: UCI Europe Tour
- Type: Single-day

History
- First edition: 2011
- Editions: 2 (as of 2012)
- First winner: Tony Gallopin (FRA)
- Most recent: Roberto Ferrari (ITA)

Flèche d'Emeraude is a single-day road bicycle race to be held annually from 2011 in April in a circuit around Saint-Malo, Brittany, France. The race will be organized as a 1.1 event on the UCI Europe Tour.

== Winners ==
| Year | Country | Rider | Team |
|---|---|---|---|
| 2011 | France | Tony Gallopin | Cofidis |
| 2012 | Italy | Roberto Ferrari | Androni Giocattoli–Venezuela |
| 2013 | No race | | |
