= List of wins by Bretagne–Jean Floc'h and its successors =

This is a comprehensive list of victories of the Arkéa–B&B Hotels cycling team formerly known as Bretagne–Jean Floc'h, Bretagne–Armor Lux, Bretagne–Schuller, Bretagne–Séché Environnement, Fortuneo–Vital Concept, Fortuneo–Oscaro and Fortuneo–Samsic. The races are categorized according to the UCI Continental Circuits rules. The team was in the UCI Continental category from 2005 to 2010 then up to UCI Professional Continental from 2011 till present.

== 2005 – Bretagne–Jean Floc'h ==
Stage 3 Tour de Normandie, Stéphane Pétilleau
Overall Ruban Granitier Breton, Stéphane Pétilleau

Stage 2, Stéphane Pétilleau
Stage 5, Charles Guilbert

Overall Tour de Gironde, Charles Guilbert

Stage 1, Charles Guilbert

Stage 2 Route du Sud, Stéphane Pétilleau
Stage 3 Boucles de la Mayenne, Charles Guilbert
Overall Tour de l'Ain, Carl Naibo

Stage 3, Carl Naibo
Stage 4, Samuel Plouhinec

Stage 9 Tour de l'Avenir, Carl Naibo

== 2006 – Bretagne–Jean Floc'h ==
Stage 4 Étoile des Bèsseges, Stéphane Pétilleau
Stage 8 Tour de Normandie, Stéphane Pétilleau
Stage 1 Tour de Bretagne, David Lelay
Grand Prix de Plumelec-Morbihan, Cédric Hervé
Stage 2 Boucles de la Mayenne, David Lelay
Stage 3 Tour de l'Ain, Noan Lelarge
Stage 2 Tour du Limousin, Noan Lelarge
Stage 2 Tour de la Somme, Noan Lelarge
Stage 3 Tour du Faso, Jean-Luc Delpech
Stage 4 & 9 Tour du Faso, Stéphane Bonsergent

== 2007 – Bretagne–Armor Lux ==
Stage 5 Tour de Normandie, Noan Lelarge
Stage 2 Four Days of Dunkirk, Piotr Zieliński
Polymultipliée Lyonnaise, Noan Lelarge

== 2008 – Bretagne–Armor Lux ==
Stage 2 La Tropicale Amissa Bongo, Stéphane Bonsergent
Stage 5 La Tropicale Amissa Bongo, Jean-Luc Delpech
Paris–Troyes, Jean-Luc Delpech
Overall Tour de Normandie, Antoine Dalibard
Tour du Finistère, David Lelay
Overall Tour de Bretagne, Benoît Poilvet

Stage 5, Benoît Poilvet

Trophée des Grimpeurs, David Lelay
Stage 1 Boucles de la Mayenne, Piotr Zieliński
Stage 2 Route du Sud, Noan Lelarge
Stage 2 Kreiz Breizh Elites, Cyril Gautier

== 2009 – Bretagne–Schuller ==
Overall Circuit des Ardennes, Dimitri Champion
Tour du Finistère, Dimitri Champion
Stage 3 Four Days of Dunkirk, Sébastien Duret
France Road Race Championship, Dimitri Champion
Overall Kreiz Breizh Elites, Antoine Dalibard

Stage 1, Dimitri Champion
Stage 3, Jean-Marc Bideau

== 2010 – Bretagne–Schuller ==
Stage 7 Tour de Normandie, Laurent Pichon
Stage 3b Circuit des Ardennes, Florian Vachon
Tour du Finistère, Florian Vachon
Stage 7 Tour de Bretagne, Gaël Malacarne
Stage 2 Rhône-Alpes Isère Tour, Sébastien Duret
Boucles de l'Aulne, Jean-Luc Delpech
Stage 2 Circuito Montañés, Noan Lelarge
Stage 3 Circuito Montañés, Lilian Jégou
Stage 5 Circuito Montañés, Gaël Malacarne
Stage 1 Route du Sud, Florian Vachon
Stage 3 Boucles de la Mayenne, Jean-Luc Delpech
Overall Kreiz Breizh Elites, Johan Le Bon

Stage 3, Johan Le Bon

Overall Mi-Août Bretonne, Jean-Luc Delpech

== 2011 – Bretagne–Schuller ==
Stage 3 Tour de Normandie, Guillaume Blot
Stage 5 Tour de Normandie, Jean-Marc Bideau
Route Adélie de Vitré, Renaud Dion
Stage 3b Circuit des Ardennes, Laurent Pichon
Stage 1 Boucles de la Mayenne, Éric Berthou
Overall Kreiz Breizh Elites, Laurent Pichon
Grand Prix de Fourmies, Guillaume Blot

== 2012 – Bretagne–Schuller ==
Stage 1 Tour du Haut Var, Romain Hardy
Paris–Troyes, Jean-Marc Bideau
Classic Loire Atlantique, Florian Vachon
Stage 6 Tour de Normandie, Jean-Marc Bideau
Stage 1 Critérium International, Florian Vachon
Val d'Ille U Classic 35, Éric Berthou
Stage 2 Tour de Bretagne, Éric Berthou
Overall Ronde de l'Oise, Jean-Luc Delpech

Stage 4, Jean-Luc Delpech

Overall Boucles de la Mayenne, Laurent Pichon
Paris–Bourges, Florian Vachon

== 2013 – Bretagne–Séché Environnement ==
Paris–Troyes, Jean-Marc Bideau
Stage 7 Tour de Bretagne, Pierre-Luc Périchon
Stage 3 Kreiz Breizh Elites, Erwann Corbel
Stage 2 Tour du Gévaudan, Sébastien Duret

== 2014 – Bretagne–Séché Environnement ==
Classic Sud-Ardèche, Florian Vachon
Stage 6 Tour de Normandie, Benoît Jarrier
Stage 1 Ronde de l'Oise, Romain Feillu
Stage 1 Boucles de la Mayenne, Armindo Fonseca
Tour du Jura, Kevin Ledanois
Tour de Vendée, Armindo Fonseca

== 2015 – Bretagne–Séché Environnement ==
Stage 3 La Tropicale Amissa Bongo, Daniel McLay
Stages 5, 7 & 8 La Tropicale Amissa Bongo, Yauheni Hutarovich
Classic Sud-Ardèche, Eduardo Sepúlveda
Cholet-Pays de Loire, Pierrick Fédrigo
Route Adélie, Romain Feillu
Stage 1 Tour du Poitou-Charentes, Arnaud Gérard
Tour du Doubs, Eduardo Sepúlveda

== 2016 – Fortuneo–Vital Concept ==
Stage 4 Tour de San Luis, Eduardo Sepúlveda
Stage 7 La Tropicale Amissa Bongo, Yauheni Hutarovich
GP de Denain, Daniel McLay
Stages 2 & 5 Le Tour de Bretagne Cycliste trophée harmonie Mutuelle, Boris Vallée
Grand Prix de la Somme, Daniel McLay
Stage 3 Ronde de l'Oise, Boris Vallée
Stage 3 Tour de Savoie Mont Blanc, Pierre-Luc Périchon

== 2017 – Fortuneo–Vital Concept/Fortuneo–Oscaro ==
Trofeo Playa de Palma, Daniel McLay
Classic Loire Atlantique, Laurent Pichon
Overall Tour de Normandie, Anthony Delaplace

Stage 1, Anthony Delaplace

Stage 1a Settimana Internazionale di Coppi e Bartali, Laurent Pichon
Route Adélie de Vitré, Laurent Pichon

== 2018 – Fortuneo–Samsic ==
Stage 1 Tour de Savoie Mont Blanc, Maxime Bouet
La Poly Normande, Pierre-Luc Perichon

== 2019 – Arkéa–Samsic ==
Stage 6 La Tropicale Amissa Bongo, André Greipel
Overall Vuelta Ciclista Comunidad de Madrid, Clément Russo

Stage 3 Maxime Daniel

Stage 1 Le Tour de Savoie Mont Blanc, Romain Hardy
France Road Race Championship, Warren Barguil

== 2020 – Arkéa–Samsic ==
Stage 4 Tour of Saudi Arabia, Nacer Bouhanni
Overall Tour de la Provence, Nairo Quintana

Stage 1, Nacer Bouhanni
Stage 3, Nairo Quintana

Overall Tour du Haut Var, Nairo Quintana

Stage 2, Nairo Quintana

Grand Prix de la Ville de Lillers, Florian Vachon
Stage 7 Paris–Nice, Nairo Quintana
Grand Prix d'Isbergues, Nacer Bouhanni
Paris-Chauny, Nacer Bouhanni
Stages 5 & 6 Volta a Portugal, Daniel McLay

== 2021 – Arkéa–Samsic ==
Overall Vuelta Asturias, Nairo Quintana

Stage 1, Nairo Quintana

Stage 5 Volta ao Algarve, Élie Gesbert
Trofeo Andratx – Mirador d'Es Colomer, Winner Anacona
Tro-Bro Léon, Connor Swift
Vuelta a Castilla y León, Matis Louvel
Overall Tour du Limousin, Warren Barguil
Overall Tour Poitou-Charentes en Nouvelle-Aquitaine, Connor Swift
Classic Loire Atlantique, Alan Riou
Tour de Vendée, Bram Welten

== 2022 – Arkéa–Samsic ==
Grand Prix La Marseillaise, Amaury Capiot
Overall Tour de la Provence, Nairo Quintana

Stage 3, Nairo Quintana

Overall Tour des Alpes-Maritimes et du Var, Nairo Quintana

Stage 3, Nairo Quintana

Stage 5 Tirreno–Adriatico, Warren Barguil
La Roue Tourangelle, Nacer Bouhanni
GP Miguel Induráin, Warren Barguil
Paris–Camembert, Anthony Delaplace
Tro-Bro Léon, Hugo Hofstetter
Stage 3 Boucles de la Mayenne, Amaury Capiot
Druivenkoers Overijse, Matis Louvel

== 2023 – Arkéa–Samsic ==
Muscat Classic, Jenthe Biermans
Overall Tour des Alpes-Maritimes et du Var, Kévin Vauquelin

Stage 1, Kévin Vauquelin

Tour du Jura, Kévin Vauquelin
Stage 2 Tour du Limousin, Luca Mozzato
Stage 4 Arctic Race of Norway, Clément Champoussin
Stage 2 Tour de Luxembourg, Jenthe Biermans
Tour de Vendée, Arnaud Démare
Binche–Chimay–Binche, Luca Mozzato
Paris–Bourges, Arnaud Démare

== 2024 – Arkéa–B&B Hotels ==
Stage 5 (ITT) Étoile de Bessèges, Kévin Vauquelin
Stage 4 Tour of Oman, Amaury Capiot
Bredene Koksijde Classic, Luca Mozzato
Route Adélie, Jenthe Biermans
Stage 2 Région Pays de la Loire Tour, Ewen Costiou
Stage 2 Tour de France, Kévin Vauquelin
Stage 4 Tour Poitou-Charentes en Nouvelle Aquitaine, Arnaud Démare
Giro della Toscana, Clément Champoussin
Paris–Chauny, Arnaud Démare

== 2025 – Arkéa–B&B Hotels ==
Overall Étoile de Bessèges, Kévin Vauquelin

Stages 4 & 5 (ITT), Kévin Vauquelin

Overall Région Pays de la Loire Tour, Kévin Vauquelin

Stage 2, Victor Guernalec
Stage 4, Kévin Vauquelin

Mercan'Tour Classic, Cristián Rodríguez
Stage 1 (ITT) Route d'Occitanie, Raúl García Pierna

== Supplementary statistics ==
'Grand Tours by highest finishing position
Race	2011	2012	2013	2014	2015	2016	2017	2018	2019	2020	2021	2022	2023	2024
Giro d'Italia	–	–	–	–	–	–	–	–	–	–	–	–	17	25
Tour de France	–	–	–	16	52	59	16	17	10	14	28	41	22	36
Vuelta a España	–	–	–	–	–	–	–	–	–	–	–	42	13	13
'Major week-long stage races by highest finishing position
Race	2011	2012	2013	2014	2015	2016	2017	2018	2019	2020	2021	2022	2023	2024
Tour Down Under	–	–	–	–	–	–	–	–	–	–	NH		20	28
Paris–Nice	47	–	–	20	35	35	15	17	38	6	14	5	18	17
Tirreno–Adriatico	–	–	–	–	–	–	–	–	–	–	12	20	24	10
Volta a Catalunya	–	–	–	–	43	–	–	15	62	NH	14	4	22	12
Tour of the Basque Country	–	–	–	–	–	–	–	–	–	NH	–	–	14	8
Tour de Romandie	–	–	–	–	–	–	–	–	–	NH	–	–	41	12
Critérium du Dauphiné	–	–	38	–	–	–	–	19	13	9	18	24	20	70
Tour de Suisse	–	–	–	–	–	–	–	–	–	NH	–	–	32	42
Tour de Pologne	–	–	–	–	–	–	–	–	–	–	–	–	20	11
Eneco Tour	–	–	–	–	–	–	–	–	–	–	–	NH	21	39
'Monument races by highest finishing position
Race	2011	2012	2013	2014	2015	2016	2017	2018	2019	2020	2021	2022	2023	2024
Milan–San Remo	–	–	–	–	–	–	–	–	–	38	19	27	40	24
Tour of Flanders	–	–	–	–	–	–	–	–	–	–	29	17	27	2
Paris–Roubaix	74	44	40	45	38	64	55	77	46	NH	18	8	21	23
Liège–Bastogne–Liège	–	–	–	–	–	73	–	53	96	9	26	15	74	83
Giro di Lombardia	–	–	–	–	–	–	–	26	–	–	11	12	24	
'Classics by highest finishing position
Classic	2011	2012	2013	2014	2015	2016	2017	2018	2019	2020	2021	2022	2023	2024
Omloop Het Nieuwsblad	51	53	121	23	35	27	31	29	–	46	12	14	13	17
Kuurne–Brussels–Kuurne	43	17	–	62	28	28	34	DNF	8	–	41	3	15	44
Strade Bianche	–	–	–	–	–	–	–	–	–	10	57	27	20	21
E3 Harelbeke	–	–	–	–	–	45	–	–	–	NH	–	–	19	9
Gent–Wevelgem	–	–	–	–	–	–	–	–	–	–	54	–	10	15
Amstel Gold Race	–	–	–	–	–	–	–	–	–	NH	25	21	35	41
La Flèche Wallonne	–	–	–	–	16	38	24	45	–	4	5	9	10	2
Clásica de San Sebastián	–	–	–	–	–	–	–	–	–	NH	44	–	14	70
Paris–Tours	26	5	32	8	13	31	80	44	20	5	10	8	8	31

Legend
—	Did not compete
DNF	Did not finish
NH	Not held
