= 2014 Bretagne–Séché Environnement season =

2014 Bretagne–Séché Environnement season
| Manager | Emmanuel Hubert |
| One-day victories | 3 |
| Stage race overall victories | – |
| Stage race stage victories | 3 |
Previous season • Next season

The 2014 season for Bretagne–Séché Environnement began in January at the Tour de San Luis. Bretagne–Séché Environnement is a French-registered UCI Professional Continental cycling team that participated in road bicycle racing events on the UCI Continental Circuits and when selected as a wildcard to UCI ProTour events.

== Team roster ==
As of 19 January 2014.

| Rider | Date of birth |
|---|---|
| Jean-Marc Bideau (FRA) | 8 April 1984 (aged 29) |
| Franck Bonnamour (Note: Bonnamour joined the team on 1 August as a stagiaire, from BIC 2000.) (FRA) | 20 June 1995 (aged 18) |
| Erwann Corbel (FRA) | 20 April 1991 (aged 22) |
| Anthony Delaplace (FRA) | 11 September 1989 (aged 24) |
| Brice Feillu (FRA) | 26 July 1985 (aged 28) |
| Romain Feillu (FRA) | 16 April 1984 (aged 29) |
| Armindo Fonseca (FRA) | 1 May 1989 (aged 24) |
| Arnaud Gérard (FRA) | 10 June 1984 (aged 29) |
| Florian Guillou (FRA) | 29 December 1982 (aged 31) |
| Benoît Jarrier (FRA) | 1 February 1988 (aged 25) |

| Rider | Date of birth |
|---|---|
| Axel Journiaux (Note: Journiaux joined the team on 1 August as a stagiaire, from Vendée U.) (FRA) | 20 May 1995 (aged 18) |
| Clément Koretzky (FRA) | 30 October 1990 (aged 23) |
| Christophe Laborie (FRA) | 5 August 1986 (aged 27) |
| Vegard Stake Laengen (NOR) | 7 February 1989 (aged 24) |
| Benjamin Le Montagner (FRA) | 3 December 1988 (aged 25) |
| Kevin Ledanois (Note: Journiaux joined the team on 1 August as a stagiaire.) (FRA) | 13 July 1993 (aged 20) |
| Pierre-Luc Périchon (FRA) | 4 January 1987 (aged 27) |
| Eduardo Sepúlveda (ARG) | 13 June 1991 (aged 22) |
| Florian Vachon (FRA) | 2 January 1985 (aged 29) |

Riders who joined the team for the 2014 season

| Rider | 2013 team |
|---|---|
| Anthony Delaplace | Sojasun |
| Brice Feillu | Sojasun |
| Romain Feillu | Vacansoleil–DCM |
| Christophe Laborie | Sojasun |

Riders who left the team during or after the 2013 season

| Rider | 2014 team |
|---|---|
| Jean-Luc Delpech | Entente Sud Gascogne |
| Renaud Dion | |
| Sébastien Duret | |
| Geoffroy Lequatre | |
| Gaël Malacarne | |

== Season victories ==
| Date | Race | Competition | Rider | Country | Location |
|---|---|---|---|---|---|
| 9 February | Étoile de Bessèges, Mountains classification | UCI Europe Tour | Clément Koretzky (FRA) | France | |
| 16 February | Tour Méditerranéen, Young rider classification | UCI Europe Tour | Eduardo Sepúlveda (ARG) | France | |
| 23 February | Tour du Haut Var, Mountains classification | UCI Europe Tour | Florian Guillou (FRA) | France | |
| 1 March | Classic Sud-Ardèche | UCI Europe Tour | Florian Vachon (FRA) | France | Ruoms |
| 30 March | Tour de Normandie, Stage 6 | UCI Europe Tour | Benoît Jarrier (FRA) | France | Caen |
| 6 June | Boucles de la Mayenne, Stage 1 | UCI Europe Tour | Armindo Fonseca (FRA) | France | Bonchamp-lès-Laval |
| 8 June | Boucles de la Mayenne, Sprints classification | UCI Europe Tour | Anthony Delaplace (FRA) | France | |
| 8 June | Boucles de la Mayenne, Teams classification | UCI Europe Tour | (Note: The riders on the squad were Eduardo Sepúlveda, Arnaud Gérard, Armindo Fonseca, Anthony Delaplace, Florian Vachon and Brice Feillu) | France | |
| 12 June | Ronde de l'Oise, Stage 1 | UCI Europe Tour | Romain Feillu (FRA) | France | Fitz-James |
| 13 September | Tour du Jura | UCI Europe Tour | Kévin Ledanois (FRA) | Switzerland | Porrentruy |
| 5 October | Tour de Vendée | UCI Europe Tour | Armindo Fonseca (FRA) | France | La Roche-sur-Yon |
