= 2015 Bretagne–Séché Environnement season =

Bretagne–Séché Environnement
- 2015 season
- UCI code: BSE
- Status: UCI Professional Continental
- Manager: Emmanuel Hubert
- Main sponsor(s): Séché Environnement
- Based: France
- Bicycles: Look

Season victories
- One-day races: 4
- Stage race overall: –
- Stage race stages: 5

The 2015 season for Bretagne–Séché Environnement began in January at the Tour de San Luis. Bretagne–Séché Environnement is a French-registered UCI Professional Continental cycling team that participated in road bicycle racing events on the UCI Continental Circuits and when selected as a wildcard to UCI ProTour events.

== Team roster ==
Rider	Date of birth
Jean-Marc Bideau (FRA)	8 April 1984 (aged 30)
Franck Bonnamour (Note: Bonnamour joined the team on 1 August as a stagiaire, from BIC 2000.) (FRA)	20 June 1995 (aged 19)
Matthieu Boulo (FRA)	11 May 1989 (aged 25)
Frédéric Brun (FRA)	18 August 1988 (aged 26)
Maxime Cam (FRA)	9 July 1992 (aged 22)
Anthony Delaplace (FRA)	11 September 1989 (aged 25)
Brice Feillu (FRA)	26 July 1985 (aged 29)
Romain Feillu (FRA)	16 April 1984 (aged 30)
Armindo Fonseca (FRA)	1 May 1989 (aged 25)
Pierrick Fédrigo (FRA)	30 November 1978 (aged 36)
Arnaud Gérard (FRA)	10 June 1984 (aged 30)
Caio Godoy (Note: Godoy joined the team on 1 August as a stagiaire, from World Cycling Centre.) (BRA)	24 April 1995 (aged 19)

Rider	Date of birth
Florian Guillou (FRA)	29 December 1982 (aged 32)
Jonathan Hivert (FRA)	23 March 1985 (aged 29)
Yauheni Hutarovich (BLR)	29 November 1983 (aged 31)
Benoît Jarrier (FRA)	1 February 1988 (aged 26)
Christophe Laborie (FRA)	5 August 1986 (aged 28)
Kevin Ledanois (FRA)	13 July 1993 (aged 21)
Valentin Madouas (Note: Madouas joined the team on 1 August as a stagiaire, from BIC 2000.) (FRA)	12 July 1996 (aged 18)
Daniel McLay (GBR)	3 January 1992 (aged 22)
Pierre-Luc Périchon (FRA)	4 January 1987 (aged 27)
Eduardo Sepúlveda (ARG)	13 June 1991 (aged 23)
Florian Vachon (FRA)	2 January 1985 (aged 29)

Riders who joined the team for the 2015 season

Rider	2014 team
Matthieu Boulo	neo-pro (Team Raleigh)
Frédéric Brun	neo-pro (BigMat–Auber 93)
Maxime Cam	neo-pro (Brest Iroise 2000)
Pierrick Fédrigo	FDJ.fr
Jonathan Hivert	Belkin Pro Cycling
Yauheni Hutarovich	Ag2r–La Mondiale
Kevin Ledanois	neo-pro (CC Nogent-sur-Oise)
Daniel McLay	neo-pro (Lotto–Belisol U23)

Riders who left the team during or after the 2014 season

Rider	2015 team
Erwann Corbel	VC Pays de Loudéac
Clément Koretzky	Team Vorarlberg
Vegard Stake Laengen	Team Joker
Benjamin Le Montagner	Team UC Nantes Atlantique

== Season victories ==
Date	Race	Competition	Rider	Country	Location
18 February	La Tropicale Amissa Bongo, Stage 3	UCI Africa Tour	Daniel McLay (GBR)	Gabon	Koulamoutou
20 February	La Tropicale Amissa Bongo, Stage 5	UCI Africa Tour	Yauheni Hutarovich (BLR)	Gabon	Kango
21 February	La Tropicale Amissa Bongo, Stage 7	UCI Africa Tour	Yauheni Hutarovich (BLR)	Gabon	Port-Gentil
22 February	La Tropicale Amissa Bongo, Stage 8	UCI Africa Tour	Yauheni Hutarovich (BLR)	Gabon	Libreville
22 February	Tour du Haut Var, Teams classification	UCI Europe Tour	(Note: The riders on the squad were Pierrick Fédrigo, Brice Feillu, Jean-Marc Bideau, Armindo Fonseca, Arnaud Gérard, Jonathan Hivert, Eduardo Sepúlveda and Florian Vachon)	France	
28 February	Classic Sud-Ardèche	UCI Europe Tour	Eduardo Sepúlveda (ARG)	France	Ruoms
22 March	Cholet-Pays de Loire	UCI Europe Tour	Pierrick Fédrigo (FRA)	France	Cholet
3 April	Route Adélie	UCI Europe Tour	Romain Feillu (FRA)	France	Vitré
10 May	Four Days of Dunkirk, Sprints classification	UCI Europe Tour	Benoît Jarrier (FRA)	France	
10 May	Four Days of Dunkirk, Teams classification	UCI Europe Tour	(Note: The riders on the squad were Pierrick Fédrigo, Matthieu Boulo, Maxime Cam, Brice Feillu, Arnaud Gérard, Yauheni Hutarovich, Benoît Jarrier and Florian Vachon)	France	
25 August	Tour du Poitou-Charentes, Stage 1	UCI Europe Tour	Arnaud Gérard (FRA)	France	Barbezieux-Saint-Hilaire
13 September	Tour du Doubs	UCI Europe Tour	Eduardo Sepúlveda (ARG)	France	Pontarlier
