= 2010 Tro-Bro Léon =

Race details
- Dates: 18 April 2010
- Stages: 1
- Distance: 205 km (127.4 mi)
- Winning time: 4h 58' 26"

Results
	Winner	Jérémy Roy (FRA)
	Second	Renaud Dion (FRA)
	Third	Lloyd Mondory (FRA)

The 2010 Tro-Bro Léon was the 27th edition of the Tro-Bro Léon cycle race and was held on 18 April 2010. The race was won by Jérémy Roy.

== General classification ==
Final general classification

Rank	Rider	Time
1	Jérémy Roy (FRA)	4h 58' 26"
2	Renaud Dion (FRA)	+ 3"
3	Lloyd Mondory (FRA)	+ 5"
4	Jean-Luc Delpech (FRA)	+ 5"
5	Florian Vachon (FRA)	+ 13"
6	Benoît Daeninck (FRA)	+ 38"
7	Cyril Lemoine (FRA)	+ 38"
8	Perrig Quéméneur (FRA)	+ 38"
9	Romain Lemarchand (FRA)	+ 43"
10	Jimmy Engoulvent (FRA)	+ 1' 22"
