= 2011 Clásica de Almería =

Race details
- Dates: 27 February 2011
- Stages: 1
- Distance: 177.6 km (110.4 mi)
- Winning time: 4h 22' 56"

Results
	Winner	Matteo Pelucchi (ITA)
	Second	José Joaquín Rojas (ESP)
	Third	Pim Ligthart (NED)

The 2011 Clásica de Almería was the 26th edition of the Clásica de Almería cycle race and was held on 27 February 2011. The race started and finished in Almería. The race was won by Matteo Pelucchi.

== General classification ==
Final general classification

Rank	Rider	Time
1	Matteo Pelucchi (ITA)	4h 22' 56"
2	José Joaquín Rojas (ESP)	+ 0"
3	Pim Ligthart (NED)	+ 0"
4	Christophe Laborie (FRA)	+ 0"
5	Bartłomiej Matysiak (POL)	+ 0"
6	Aitor Galdós (ESP)	+ 0"
7	Diego Milán (DOM)	+ 0"
8	Robert Förster (GER)	+ 0"
9	Michał Gołaś (POL)	+ 0"
10	Juan José Lobato (ESP)	+ 0"
