= Éric Berthou =

French cyclist

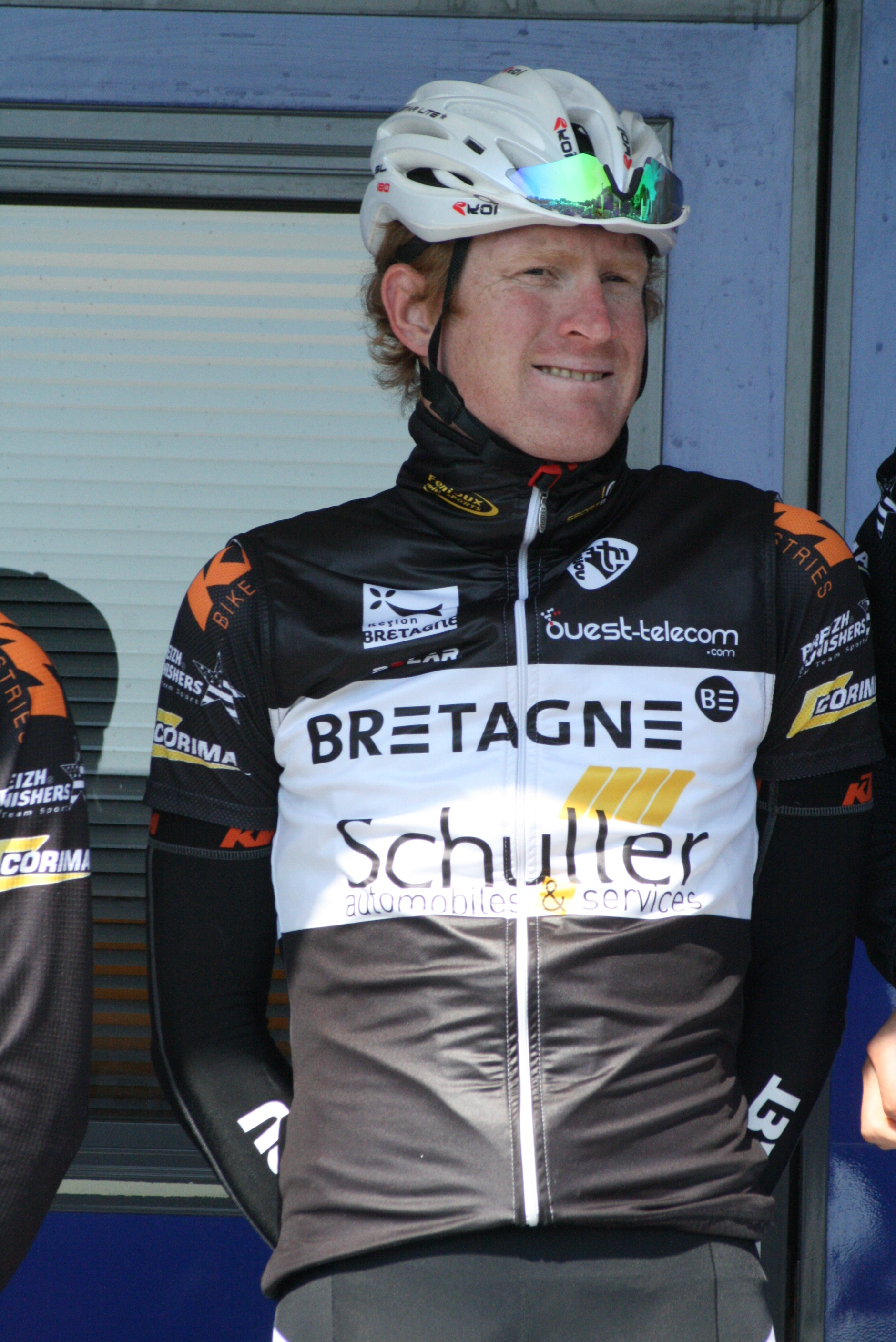
- Berthou in 2011

Personal information
- Full name: Éric Berthou
- Born: 23 January 1980 (age 46) Brest, France
- Height: 1.87 m (6 ft 2 in)
- Weight: 75 kg (165 lb)

Cycling career
- Sport: Cycling
- Current team: Ty Raleigh
- Discipline: Road
- Role: Rider (retired); Team manager
- Rider type: Sprinter

Amateur team
- 2002: Jean Floc'h

Professional teams
- 2003: Barloworld
- 2004–2005: R.A.G.T. Semences–MG Rover
- 2006–2007: Caisse d'Epargne–Illes Balears
- 2008: Crédit Agricole
- 2009–2010: Carmiooro-Avionord
- 2011–2012: Bretagne–Schuller
- 2013: Team Raleigh

Managerial teams
- 2014: Team Raleigh
- 2015–: Ty Raleigh

Éric Berthou (born 23 January 1980) is a French former professional road bicycle racer, who currently manages amateur team Ty Raleigh. His sporting career began with BIC 2000.

== Career ==
Born in Brest, Brittany, Berthou started his career with Barloworld in 2003 before joining the French R.A.G.T. Semences–MG Rover team the following season, where he won a stage of Paris–Corrèze in 2004. When R.A.G.T. Semences closed at the end of 2005, Berthou joined the Spanish ProTour squad Caisse d'Epargne–Illes Balears.

In the spring of 2012, Berthou was in a solo breakaway in the Tro Bro Leon and observers thought he was in a good position to win until he faltered with fatigue during the last 10 kilometers, allowing Canadian Ryan Roth (SpiderTech–C10) to take the victory. Berthou finished 12th in that race, with the main chase group, 37 seconds behind the winner.

Berthou retired at the end of the 2013 season, after eleven years as a professional, and joined the management team at his final professional outfit Team Raleigh.

== Major results ==
2002
1st Ronde du Pays Basque
2004
1st Stage 3 Paris–Corrèze
2012
1st Val d'Ille Classic
1st Stage 2 Tour de Bretagne
2013
3rd Rutland–Melton International CiCLE Classic
10th Grand Prix de la Ville de Lillers
