= Florian Vachon =

Road racing cyclist

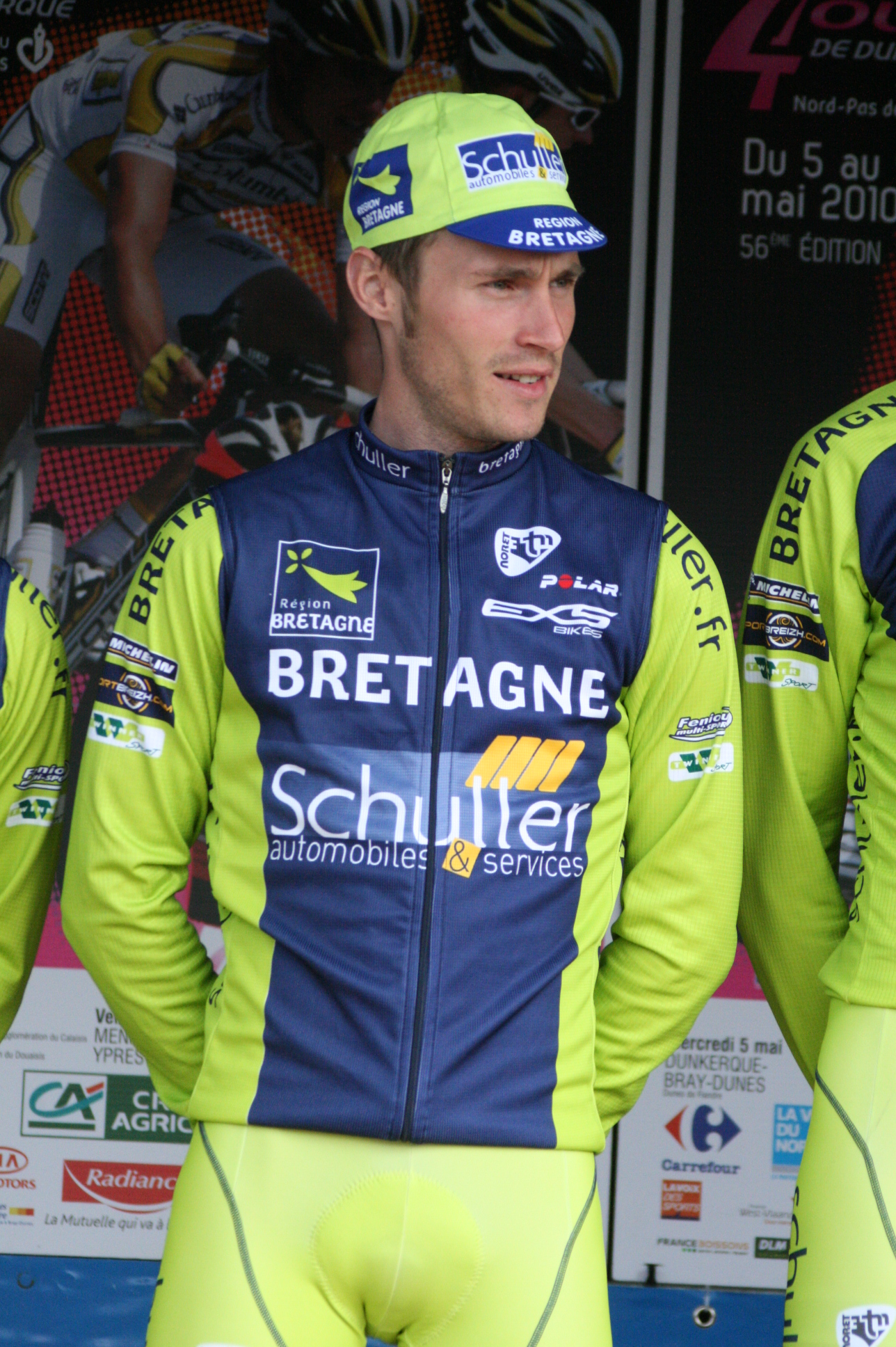
- Vachon at the 2010 Four Days of Dunkirk

Personal information
- Full name: Florian Vachon
- Born: 2 January 1985 (age 41) Montluçon, France
- Height: 1.79 m (5 ft 10 1/2 in)
- Weight: 65 kg (143 lb; 10 st 3 lb)

Cycling career
- Sport: Cycling
- Current team: Retired
- Discipline: Road
- Role: Rider

Amateur teams
- 2002–2003: VS Montluçon (junior)
- 2004: Montmarault Allier (junior)
- 2005–2007: EC Montmarault Montluçon
- 2007: Roubaix–Lille Métropole (stagiaire)

Professional teams
- 2008–2009: Roubaix–Lille Métropole
- 2010–2020: Bretagne–Schuller

Florian Vachon (born 2 January 1985) is a French former professional road bicycle racer, who rode professionally between 2008 and 2020, for the Roubaix–Lille Métropole, and Bretagne–Schuller/Arkéa–Samsic teams.

== Major results ==
2005
2nd Championat d'Auvergne
2006
2nd Circuit des 2 ponts Montluçon
2007
Tour du Haut-Anjou

1st Points classification
1st Stages 3 & 4

1st Circuit Boussaquin
2nd Paris–Tours Espoirs
3rd Ronde du Pays Basque
8th Road race, UCI Under-23 Road World Championships
8th Road race, UCI European Under-23 Road Championships
2008
1st Izegem
2nd Beuvry la Forêt
6th Tour de Vendée
2009
1st Stage 3 Tour du Gévaudan Languedoc-Roussillon
4th Tour de Vendée
6th Grand Prix de la Ville de Lillers
8th Le Samyn
8th Tro-Bro Léon
9th Grand Prix de la ville de Pérenchies
10th Grand Prix de la Somme
2010
1st Tour du Finistère
1st Stage 1 Route du Sud
1st Stage 3b Circuit des Ardennes
2nd Grand Prix de Denain
5th Tro-Bro Léon
7th Cholet-Pays de Loire
7th Tour de Vendée
8th Grand Prix de la Somme
9th Châteauroux Classic
2011
3rd Overall Ronde de l'Oise
4th Polynormande
9th Flèche d'Emeraude
2012
1st Classic Loire Atlantique
1st Paris–Bourges
1st Stage 1 Critérium International
9th Overall Paris–Corrèze
9th Grand Prix de la ville de Pérenchies
2013
2nd Overall Four Days of Dunkirk
3rd Overall Boucles de la Mayenne
4th Grand Prix de Wallonie
9th Tro-Bro Léon
2014
1st Classic Sud-Ardèche
2015
2nd Overall Tour de l'Ain
4th Overall Tour du Limousin
4th Kampioenschap van Vlaanderen
6th Tro-Bro Léon
8th Overall Four Days of Dunkirk
8th Overall Tour de Luxembourg
2016
3rd Tro-Bro Léon
6th Overall La Méditerranéenne
2017
7th Overall Settimana Internazionale di Coppi e Bartali
2020
1st Grand Prix de la Ville de Lillers

=== Grand Tour general classification results timeline ===
Grand Tour	2014	2015	2016	2017	2018	2019
Giro d'Italia	Did not contest during his career					
Tour de France	103	88	105	103	99	123
Vuelta a España	Did not contest during his career					

Legend
—	Did not compete
DNF	Did not finish
