= Stéphane Pétilleau =

French cyclist

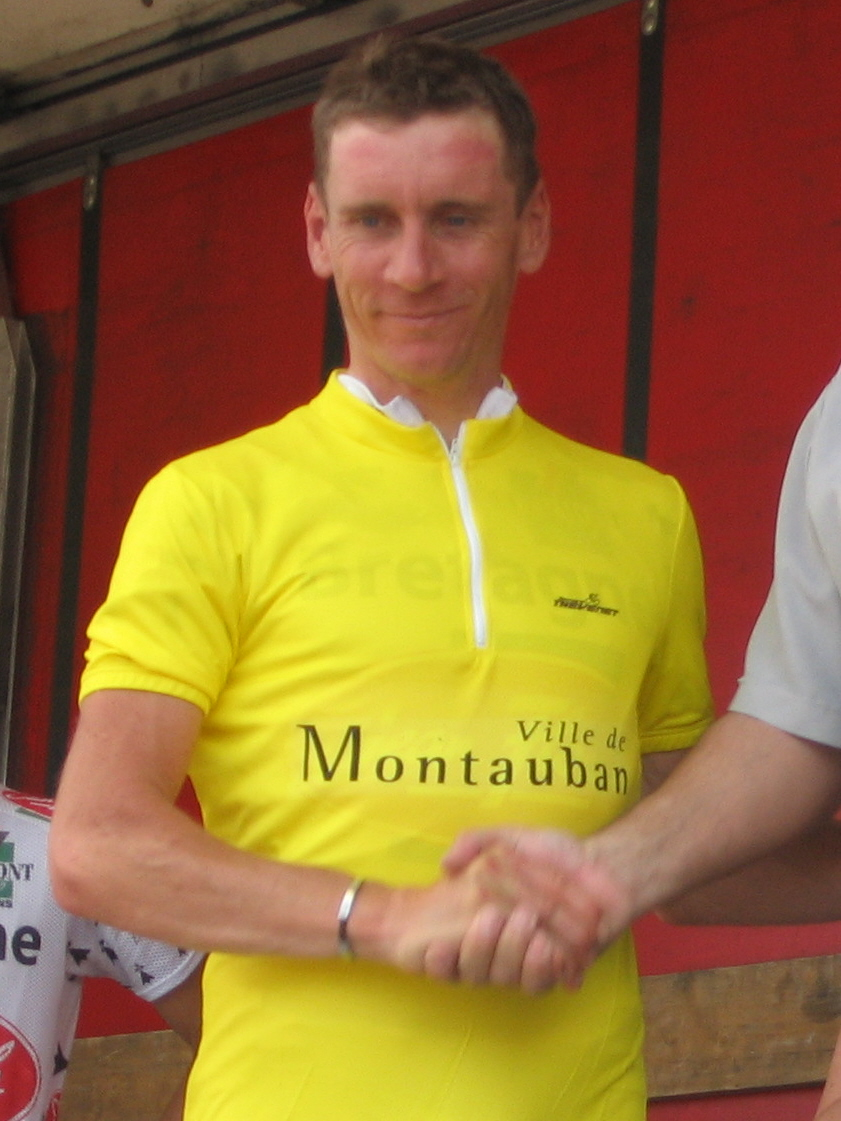
- Pétilleau in 2005

Personal information
- Nickname: La Pétille
- Born: 17 February 1971 (age 55) Château-du-Loir, France

Cycling career
- Sport: Cycling
- Discipline: Road
- Role: Rider
- Rider type: Puncheur

Amateur teams
- 1999-2004: Jean Floc'h-Mantes
- VC Roubaix Lille Métropole

Professional teams
- 1995: Castorama
- 1996-1997: TVM
- 1998: GAN
- 2005-2007: Bretagne-Jean Floc'h

Stéphane Pétilleau (born 17 February 1971) is a French former racing cyclist.

== Palmares ==
1993
2nd Paris-Connerré
1994
1st Tro-Bro Léon
1st Paris-Connerré
1995
1st Duo Normand (with Emmanuel Magnien)
1999
1st Boucles de la Mayenne
1st stage 8 Tour de Bretagne Cycliste
2000
1st Boucles de la Mayenne
2nd Tour de Franche-Comté
3rd Tour de Gironde
2001
1st Circuit du Morbihan
1st Tour de Seine-Maritime
1st stage 4 Three Days of Cherbourg
2nd Ronde du Pays Basque
2nd Tour de la Manche
2002
2nd Tour de Moselle

1st stage 1

3rd Grand Prix de la Ville de Pérenchies
2003
1st Grand Prix des Marbriers
1st Three Days of Cherbourg

1st stage 2

2004
1st Grand Prix Gilbert Bousquet
1st Grand Prix de Beuvry-la-Forêt
3rd Mi-Août Bretonne
2005
1st Tour du Tarn-et-Garonne
1st Tour de Bretagne Cycliste

1st stage 2

1st stage 2 Route du Sud
2nd Tour de Normandie

1st stage 3

3rd Tour de Vendée
2006
1st stage 4 Étoile de Bessèges
1st stage 8 Tour de Normandie
1st Trio Normand (with David Lelay and Noan Lelarge)
2nd Four Days of Dunkirk
3rd Manche-Atlantique
3rd Paris–Troyes
2007
1st Tour du Labourg
2nd Cholet-Pays de Loire
3rd Manche-Atlantique
