= 2015 Four Days of Dunkirk =

2015 UCI Europe Tour
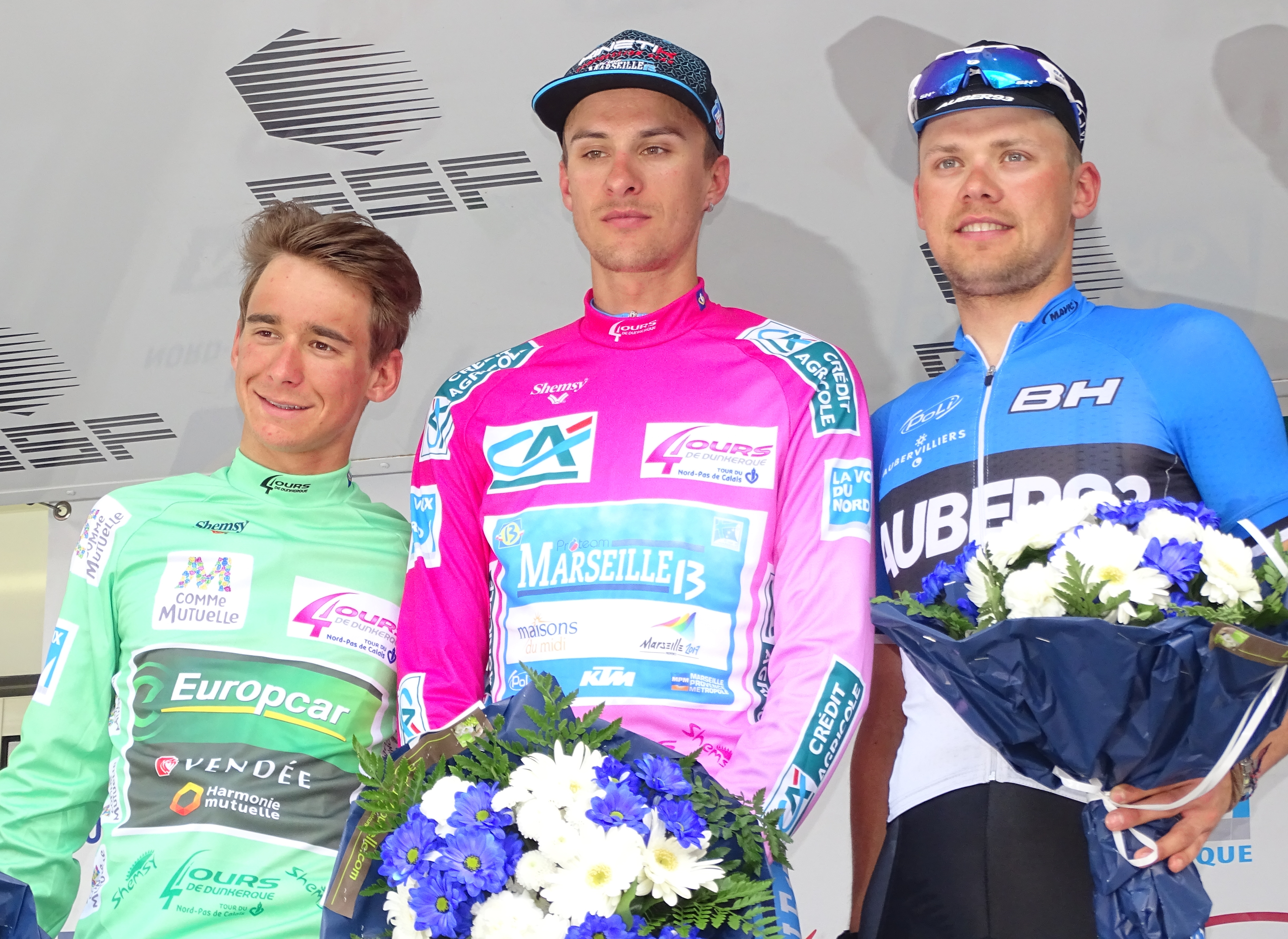
- The final podium (from left to right): Bryan Coquard, Ignatas Konovalovas and Alo Jakin.

Race details
- Dates: 6–10 May
- Stages: 5
- Distance: 883.8 km (549.2 mi)
- Winning time: 21h 25' 03"

Results
Jersey awarded to the overall winner	Winner	Ignatas Konovalovas (LTU)	(Team Marseille 13 KTM)
	Second	Bryan Coquard (FRA)	(Team Europcar)
	Third	Alo Jakin (EST)	(Auber 93)
Jersey awarded to the points classification winner	Points	Bryan Coquard (FRA)	(Team Europcar)
Jersey awarded to the mountains classification winner	Mountains	Julien Antomarchi (FRA)	(Roubaix–Lille Métropole)
Jersey awarded to the youth classification winner	Youth	Bryan Coquard (FRA)	(Team Europcar)
	Sprints	Benoît Jarrier (FRA)	(Bretagne–Séché Environnement)
	Team	Bretagne–Séché Environnement	

The 2015 Four Days of Dunkirk (French: Quatre Jours de Dunkerque 2015) was the 61st edition of the Four Days of Dunkirk cycling stage race. It started on 6 May in Dunkirk and ended on 10 May again in Dunkirk. The race was won by Lithuanian rider Ignatas Konovalovas, riding for Team Marseille 13 KTM.

== Schedule ==
Stage	Date	Course	Distance	Type	Winner	Ref
1	6 May	Dunkirk to Orchies	178.7 km (111.0 mi)	Flat stage	Bryan Coquard (FRA)	
2	7 May	Fontaine-au-Pire to Maubeuge	178.7 km (111.0 mi)	Hilly stage	Jonas Ahlstrand (SWE)	
3	8 May	Barlin to Saint-Omer	176.7 km (109.8 mi)	Hilly stage	Alexis Gougeard (FRA)	
4	9 May	Base de loisirs EOLYS (Lestrem) to Cassel	178.7 km (111.0 mi)	Hilly stage	Omar Fraile (ESP)	
5	10 May	Cappelle-la-Grande to Dunkirk	171 km (106.3 mi)	Flat stage	Edward Theuns (BEL)	
Total		883.8 km (549.2 mi)				

== Teams ==
The start list included 16 teams – 2 UCI WorldTeams, 10 Professional Continental Teams, and 4 Continental Teams.

World Teams

- FDJ
- AG2R La Mondiale

Professional Continental teams

- Cofidis
- Topsport Vlaanderen–Baloise
- Bretagne–Séché Environnement
- Team Europcar
- Caja Rural–Seguros RGA
- Colombia
- Cult Energy Pro Cycling
- Team Roompot
- Bora–Argon 18
- Wanty–Groupe Gobert

Continental teams

- Auber 93
- Roubaix–Lille Métropole
- Armée de Terre
- Team Marseille 13 KTM

== Stages ==
=== Stage 1 ===
6 May 2015 — Dunkirk to Orchies, 178.7 km (111.0 mi)

Stage 1 result
Rank	Rider	Team	Time
1	Bryan Coquard (FRA)	Team Europcar	4h 16' 34"
2	Edward Theuns (BEL)	Topsport Vlaanderen–Baloise	+ 0"
3	Ignatas Konovalovas (LIT)	Team Marseille 13 KTM	+ 4"
4	Damien Gaudin (FRA)	AG2R La Mondiale	+ 13"
5	Björn Thurau (GER)	Bora–Argon 18	+ 13"
6	Pieter Vanspeybrouck (BEL)	Topsport Vlaanderen–Baloise	+ 26"
7	Tim Declercq (BEL)	Topsport Vlaanderen–Baloise	+ 26"
8	Alo Jakin (EST)	Auber 93	+ 26"
9	Steve Chainel (FRA)	Cofidis	+ 26"
10	Mads Pedersen (DEN)	Cult Energy Pro Cycling	+ 26"

General classification after stage 1
Rank	Rider	Team	Time
1	Bryan Coquard (FRA)	Team Europcar	4h 16' 24"
2	Edward Theuns (BEL)	Topsport Vlaanderen–Baloise	+ 4"
3	Ignatas Konovalovas (LIT)	Team Marseille 13 KTM	+ 10"
4	Damien Gaudin (FRA)	AG2R La Mondiale	+ 23"
5	Björn Thurau (GER)	Bora–Argon 18	+ 23"
6	Pieter Vanspeybrouck (BEL)	Topsport Vlaanderen–Baloise	+ 36"
7	Tim Declercq (BEL)	Topsport Vlaanderen–Baloise	+ 36"
8	Alo Jakin (EST)	Auber 93	+ 36"
9	Steve Chainel (FRA)	Cofidis	+ 36"
10	Mads Pedersen (DEN)	Cult Energy Pro Cycling	+ 36"

=== Stage 2 ===
7 May 2015 — Fontaine-au-Pire to Maubeuge, 178.7 km (111.0 mi)

Stage 2 result
Rank	Rider	Team	Time
1	Jonas Ahlstrand (SWE)	Cofidis	4h 13' 50"
2	Bryan Coquard (FRA)	Team Europcar	+ 0"
3	Benjamin Giraud (FRA)	Team Marseille 13 KTM	+ 0"
4	Phil Bauhaus (GER)	Bora–Argon 18	+ 0"
5	Edward Theuns (BEL)	Topsport Vlaanderen–Baloise	+ 0"
6	Yauheni Hutarovich (BLR)	Bretagne–Séché Environnement	+ 0"
7	Baptiste Planckaert (BEL)	Roubaix–Lille Métropole	+ 0"
8	Raymond Kreder (NED)	Team Roompot	+ 0"
9	Clément Venturini (FRA)	Cofidis	+ 0"
10	Roy Jans (BEL)	Wanty–Groupe Gobert	+ 0"

General classification after stage 2
Rank	Rider	Team	Time
1	Bryan Coquard (FRA)	Team Europcar	8h 30' 06"
2	Edward Theuns (BEL)	Topsport Vlaanderen–Baloise	+ 12"
3	Yauheni Hutarovich (BLR)	Bretagne–Séché Environnement	+ 18"
4	Ignatas Konovalovas (LIT)	Team Marseille 13 KTM	+ 18"
5	Björn Thurau (GER)	Bora–Argon 18	+ 40"
6	Damien Gaudin (FRA)	AG2R La Mondiale	+ 40"
7	Mads Pedersen (DEN)	Cult Energy Pro Cycling	+ 44"
8	Steve Chainel (FRA)	Cofidis	+ 44"
9	Alexandre Blain (FRA)	Team Marseille 13 KTM	+ 44"
10	Laurent Pichon (FRA)	FDJ	+ 50"

=== Stage 3 ===
8 May 2015 — Barlin to Saint-Omer, 176.7 km (109.8 mi)

Stage 3 result
Rank	Rider	Team	Time
1	Alexis Gougeard (FRA)	AG2R La Mondiale	4h 15' 29"
2	Julien Antomarchi (FRA)	Roubaix–Lille Métropole	+ 0"
3	Brayan Ramírez (COL)	Colombia	+ 3"
4	Edward Theuns (BEL)	Topsport Vlaanderen–Baloise	+ 14"
5	Bryan Coquard (FRA)	Team Europcar	+ 14"
6	Roy Jans (BEL)	Wanty–Groupe Gobert	+ 14"
7	Raymond Kreder (NED)	Team Roompot	+ 14"
8	Jonas Ahlstrand (SWE)	Cofidis	+ 14"
9	Michael Schwarzmann (GER)	Bora–Argon 18	+ 14"
10	Yauheni Hutarovich (BLR)	Bretagne–Séché Environnement	+ 14"

General classification after stage 3
Rank	Rider	Team	Time
1	Bryan Coquard (FRA)	Team Europcar	12h 45' 49"
2	Edward Theuns (BEL)	Topsport Vlaanderen–Baloise	+ 12"
3	Yauheni Hutarovich (BLR)	Bretagne–Séché Environnement	+ 18"
4	Ignatas Konovalovas (LIT)	Team Marseille 13 KTM	+ 18"
5	Björn Thurau (GER)	Bora–Argon 18	+ 40"
6	Damien Gaudin (FRA)	AG2R La Mondiale	+ 40"
7	Mads Pedersen (DEN)	Cult Energy Pro Cycling	+ 44"
8	Steve Chainel (FRA)	Cofidis	+ 44"
9	Alexandre Blain (FRA)	Team Marseille 13 KTM	+ 44"
10	Laurent Pichon (FRA)	FDJ	+ 49"

=== Stage 4 ===
9 May 2015 — Base de loisirs EOLYS (Lestrem) to Cassel, 178.7 km (111.0 mi)

Result of stage 4
Rank	Rider	Team	Time
1	Omar Fraile (ESP)	Caja Rural–Seguros RGA	4h 44' 26"
2	Maurits Lammertink (NED)	Team Roompot	+ 3"
3	Alo Jakin (EST)	Auber 93	+ 7"
4	Rudy Molard (FRA)	Cofidis	+ 7"
5	Frederik Backaert (BEL)	Wanty–Groupe Gobert	+ 7"
6	Ignatas Konovalovas (LTU)	Team Marseille 13 KTM	+ 7"
7	Mads Pedersen (DEN)	Cult Energy Pro Cycling	+ 25"
8	Damien Gaudin (FRA)	AG2R La Mondiale	+ 25"
9	Florian Vachon (FRA)	Bretagne–Séché Environnement	+ 25"
10	Brice Feillu (FRA)	Bretagne–Séché Environnement	+ 34"

General classification after stage 4
Rank	Rider	Team	Time
1	Ignatas Konovalovas (LTU)	Team Marseille 13 KTM	17h 30' 40"
2	Bryan Coquard (FRA)	Team Europcar	+ 20"
3	Alo Jakin (EST)	Auber 93	+ 31"
4	Frederik Backaert (BEL)	Wanty–Groupe Gobert	+ 35"
5	Damien Gaudin (FRA)	AG2R La Mondiale	+ 40"
6	Mads Pedersen (DEN)	Cult Energy Pro Cycling	+ 44"
7	Edward Theuns (BEL)	Topsport Vlaanderen–Baloise	+ 56"
8	Florian Vachon (FRA)	Bretagne–Séché Environnement	+ 1' 04"
9	Brice Feillu (FRA)	Bretagne–Séché Environnement	+ 1' 36"
10	Antoine Duchesne (CAN)	Team Europcar	+ 1' 37"

=== Stage 5 ===
10 May 2015 — Cappelle-la-Grande to Dunkirk, 171 km (106.3 mi)

Stage 5 result
Rank	Rider	Team	Time
1	Edward Theuns (BEL)	Topsport Vlaanderen–Baloise	3h 54' 23"
2	Bryan Coquard (FRA)	Team Europcar	+ 0"
3	Danilo Napolitano (ITA)	Wanty–Groupe Gobert	+ 0"
4	Yauheni Hutarovich (BLR)	Bretagne–Séché Environnement	+ 0"
5	Timothy Dupont (BEL)	Roubaix–Lille Métropole	+ 0"
6	Michael Schwarzmann (GER)	Bora–Argon 18	+ 0"
7	Russell Downing (GBR)	Cult Energy Pro Cycling	+ 0"
8	André Looij (NED)	Team Roompot	+ 0"
9	Anthony Maldonado (FRA)	Auber 93	+ 0"
10	Baptiste Planckaert (BEL)	Roubaix–Lille Métropole	+ 0"

Final general classification
Rank	Rider	Team	Time
1	Ignatas Konovalovas (LTU)	Team Marseille 13 KTM	21h 25' 03"
2	Bryan Coquard (FRA)	Team Europcar	+ 14"
3	Alo Jakin (EST)	Auber 93	+ 31"
4	Frederik Backaert (BEL)	Wanty–Groupe Gobert	+ 35"
5	Damien Gaudin (FRA)	AG2R La Mondiale	+ 40"
6	Mads Pedersen (DEN)	Cult Energy Pro Cycling	+ 44"
7	Edward Theuns (BEL)	Topsport Vlaanderen–Baloise	+ 46"
8	Florian Vachon (FRA)	Bretagne–Séché Environnement	+ 1' 04"
9	Brice Feillu (FRA)	Bretagne–Séché Environnement	+ 1' 36"
10	Antoine Duchesne (CAN)	Team Europcar	+ 1' 37"

== Classification leadership table ==
Stage	Winner	General classification	Mountains classification	Points classification	Young rider classification	Teams classification
1	Bryan Coquard	Bryan Coquard	Preben Van Hecke	Bryan Coquard	Bryan Coquard	Topsport Vlaanderen–Baloise
2	Jonas Ahlstrand	Bryan Coquard	Preben Van Hecke	Bryan Coquard	Bryan Coquard	Topsport Vlaanderen–Baloise
3	Alexis Gougeard	Bryan Coquard	Julien Antomarchi	Bryan Coquard	Bryan Coquard	Topsport Vlaanderen–Baloise
4	Omar Fraile	Ignatas Konovalovas	Julien Antomarchi	Bryan Coquard	Bryan Coquard	Bretagne–Séché Environnement
5	Edward Theuns	Ignatas Konovalovas	Julien Antomarchi	Bryan Coquard	Bryan Coquard	Bretagne–Séché Environnement
Final		Ignatas Konovalovas	Julien Antomarchi	Bryan Coquard	Bryan Coquard	Bretagne–Séché Environnement

== Final standings ==
=== General classification ===
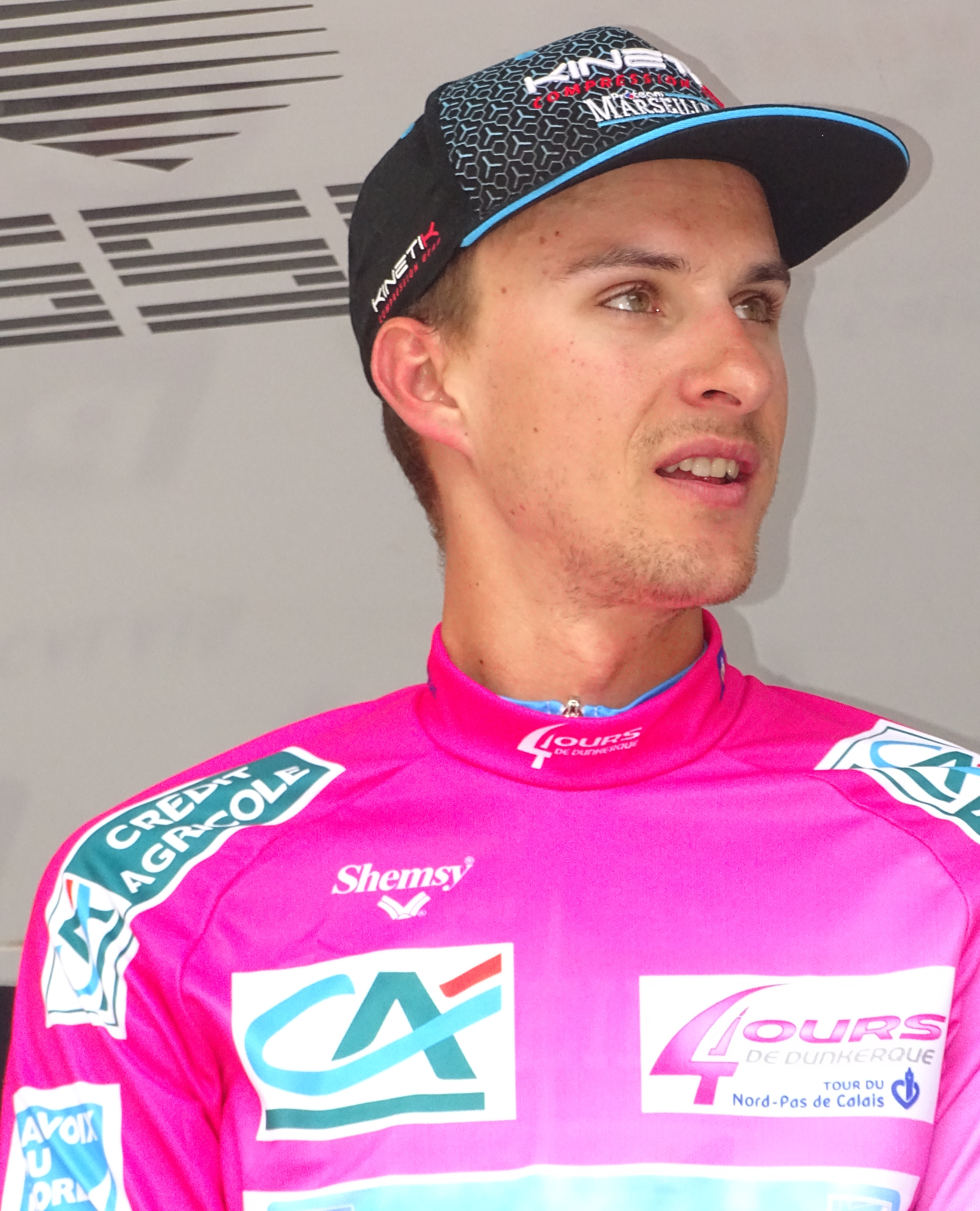
Ignatas Konovalovas, the winner of the general classification

Final general classification
Rank	Rider	Team	Time
1	Ignatas Konovalovas (LTU)	Team Marseille 13 KTM	21h 25' 03"
2	Bryan Coquard (FRA)	Team Europcar	+ 14"
3	Alo Jakin (EST)	Auber 93	+ 31"
4	Frederik Backaert (BEL)	Wanty–Groupe Gobert	+ 35"
5	Damien Gaudin (FRA)	AG2R La Mondiale	+ 40"
6	Mads Pedersen (DEN)	Cult Energy Pro Cycling	+ 44"
7	Edward Theuns (BEL)	Topsport Vlaanderen–Baloise	+ 46"
8	Florian Vachon (FRA)	Bretagne–Séché Environnement	+ 1' 04"
9	Brice Feillu (FRA)	Bretagne–Séché Environnement	+ 1' 36"
10	Antoine Duchesne (CAN)	Team Europcar	+ 1' 37"

=== Points classification ===
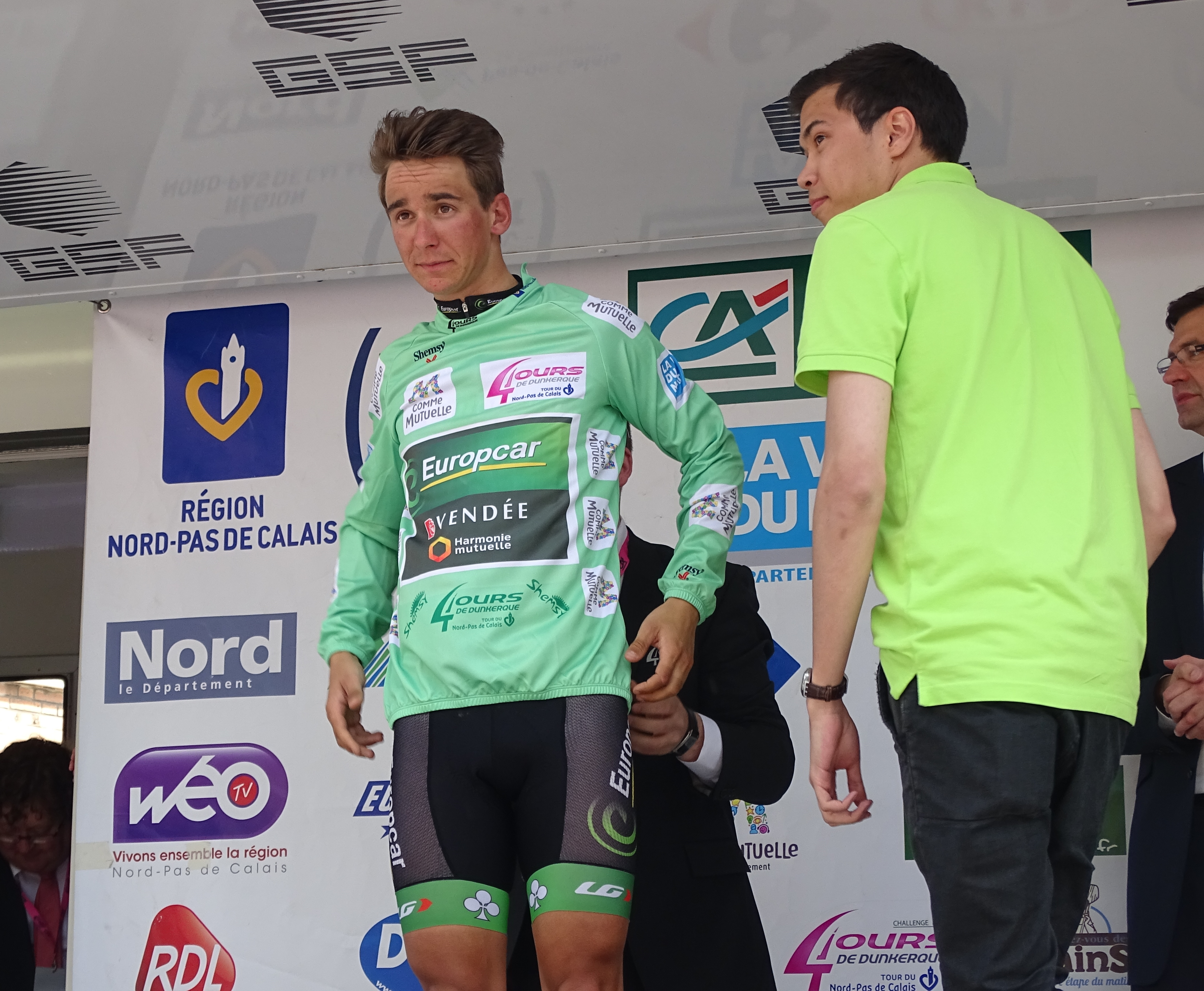
Bryan Coquard, the winner of the points classification

Final points classification
Rank	Rider	Team	Points
1	Bryan Coquard (FRA)	Team Europcar	72
2	Edward Theuns (BEL)	Topsport Vlaanderen–Baloise	61
3	Jonas Ahlstrand (SWE)	Cofidis	31
4	Alexis Gougeard (FRA)	AG2R La Mondiale	29
5	Yauheni Hutarovich (BLR)	Bretagne–Séché Environnement	29
6	Ignatas Konovalovas (LTU)	Team Marseille 13 KTM	25
7	Julien Antomarchi (FRA)	Roubaix–Lille Métropole	24
8	Mads Pedersen (DEN)	Cult Energy Pro Cycling	24
9	Alo Jakin (EST)	Auber 93	23
10	Raymond Kreder (NED)	Team Roompot	22

=== Mountains classification ===
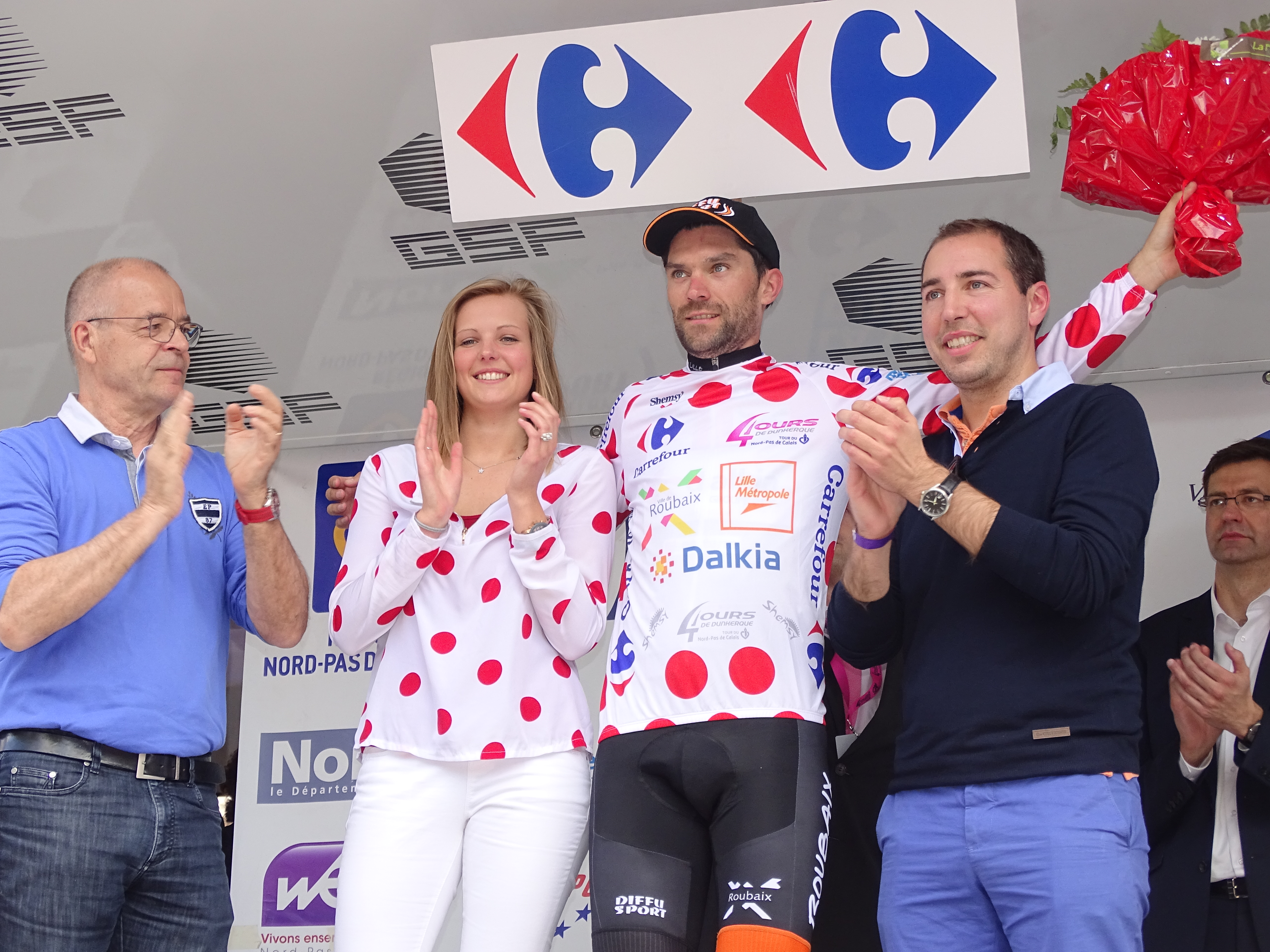
Julien Antomarchi, the winner of the mountains classification

Final mountains classification
Rank	Rider	Team	Points
1	Julien Antomarchi (FRA)	Roubaix–Lille Métropole	15
2	Brayan Ramírez (COL)	Colombia	10
3	Preben Van Hecke (BEL)	Topsport Vlaanderen–Baloise	9
4	Fabricio Ferrari (URU)	Caja Rural–Seguros RGA	7
5	Thomas Voeckler (FRA)	Team Europcar	6
6	Alexandre Blain (FRA)	Team Marseille 13 KTM	5
7	Alexis Gougeard (FRA)	AG2R La Mondiale	5
8	Ivar Slik (NED)	Team Roompot	5
9	Arnaud Gérard (FRA)	Bretagne–Séché Environnement	4
10	Quentin Pacher (FRA)	Armée de Terre	4

=== Sprints classification ===
Final sprints classification
Rank	Rider	Team	Points
1	Benoît Jarrier (FRA)	Bretagne–Séché Environnement	10
2	Thomas Voeckler (FRA)	Team Europcar	8
3	Christian Mager (GER)	Cult Energy Pro Cycling	6
4	Tim Kerkhof (NED)	Team Roompot	5
5	Laurent Pichon (FRA)	FDJ	2
6	Sébastien Turgot (FRA)	AG2R La Mondiale	2

=== Young rider classification ===
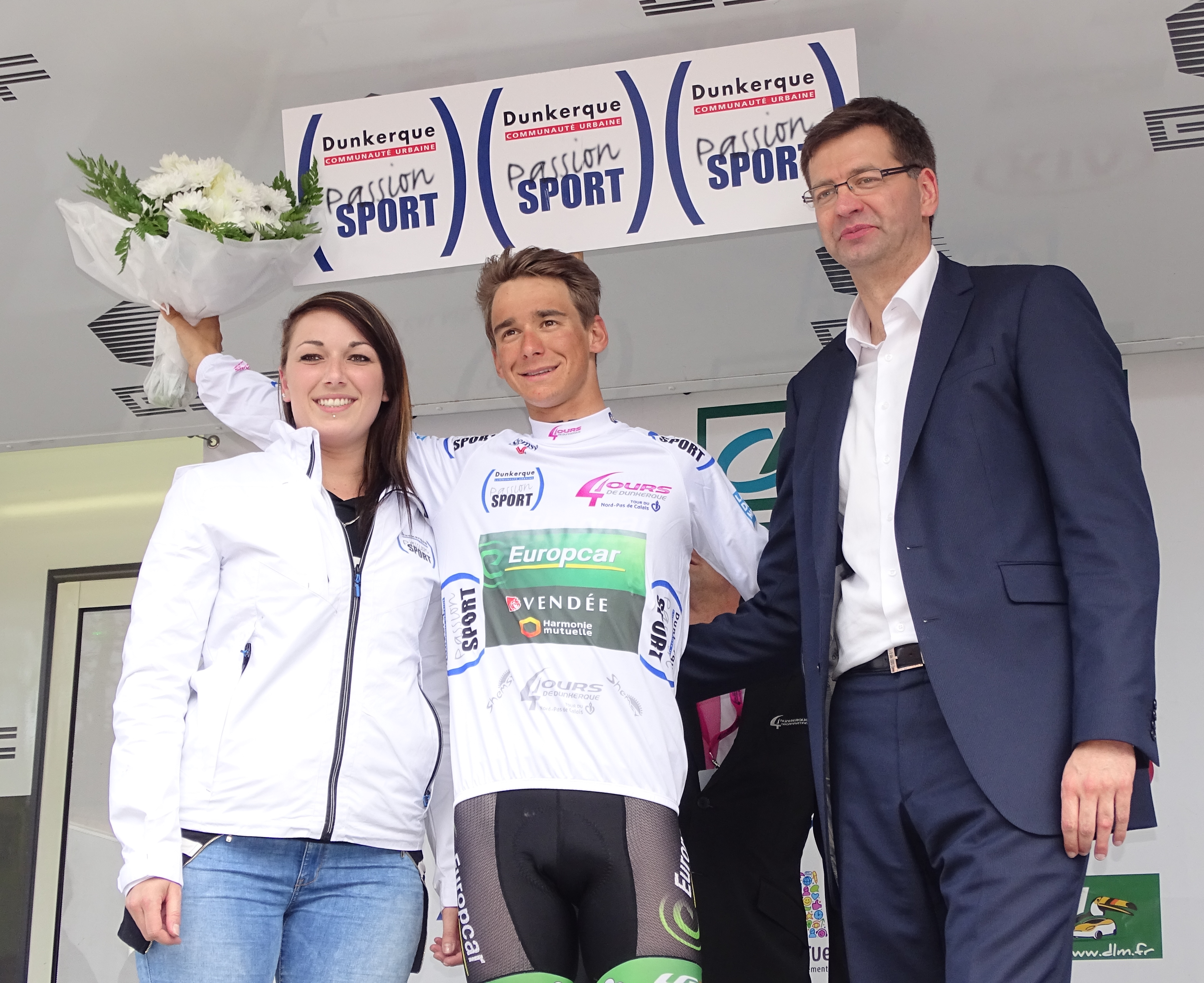
Bryan Coquard, the winner of the young rider classification

Final young rider classification
Rank	Rider	Team	Time
1	Bryan Coquard (FRA)	Team Europcar	21h 25' 17"
2	Mads Pedersen (DEN)	Cult Energy Pro Cycling	+ 30"
3	Edward Theuns (BEL)	Topsport Vlaanderen–Baloise	+ 32"
4	Antoine Duchesne (CAN)	Team Europcar	+ 1' 23"
5	Omar Fraile (ESP)	Caja Rural–Seguros RGA	+ 1' 58"
6	Maurits Lammertink (NED)	Team Roompot	+ 2' 05"
7	David Menut (FRA)	Auber 93	+ 3' 08"
8	Jimmy Turgis (FRA)	Roubaix–Lille Métropole	+ 4' 43"
9	Olivier Le Gac (FRA)	FDJ	+ 10' 50"
10	Yoann Paillot (FRA)	Team Marseille 13 KTM	+ 12' 28"

=== Teams classification ===
Final teams classification
Rank	Team	Time
1	Bretagne–Séché Environnement	64h 18' 17"
2	Team Marseille 13 KTM	+ 1' 09"
3	Auber 93	+ 4' 02"
4	Topsport Vlaanderen–Baloise	+ 6' 54"
5	Team Europcar	+ 8' 20"
6	AG2R La Mondiale	+ 8' 35"
7	Caja Rural–Seguros RGA	+ 10' 29"
8	Bora–Argon 18	+ 10' 56"
9	Team Roompot	+ 11' 21"
10	Roubaix–Lille Métropole	+ 24' 08"
