= Carl Naibo =

French cyclist (born 1982)

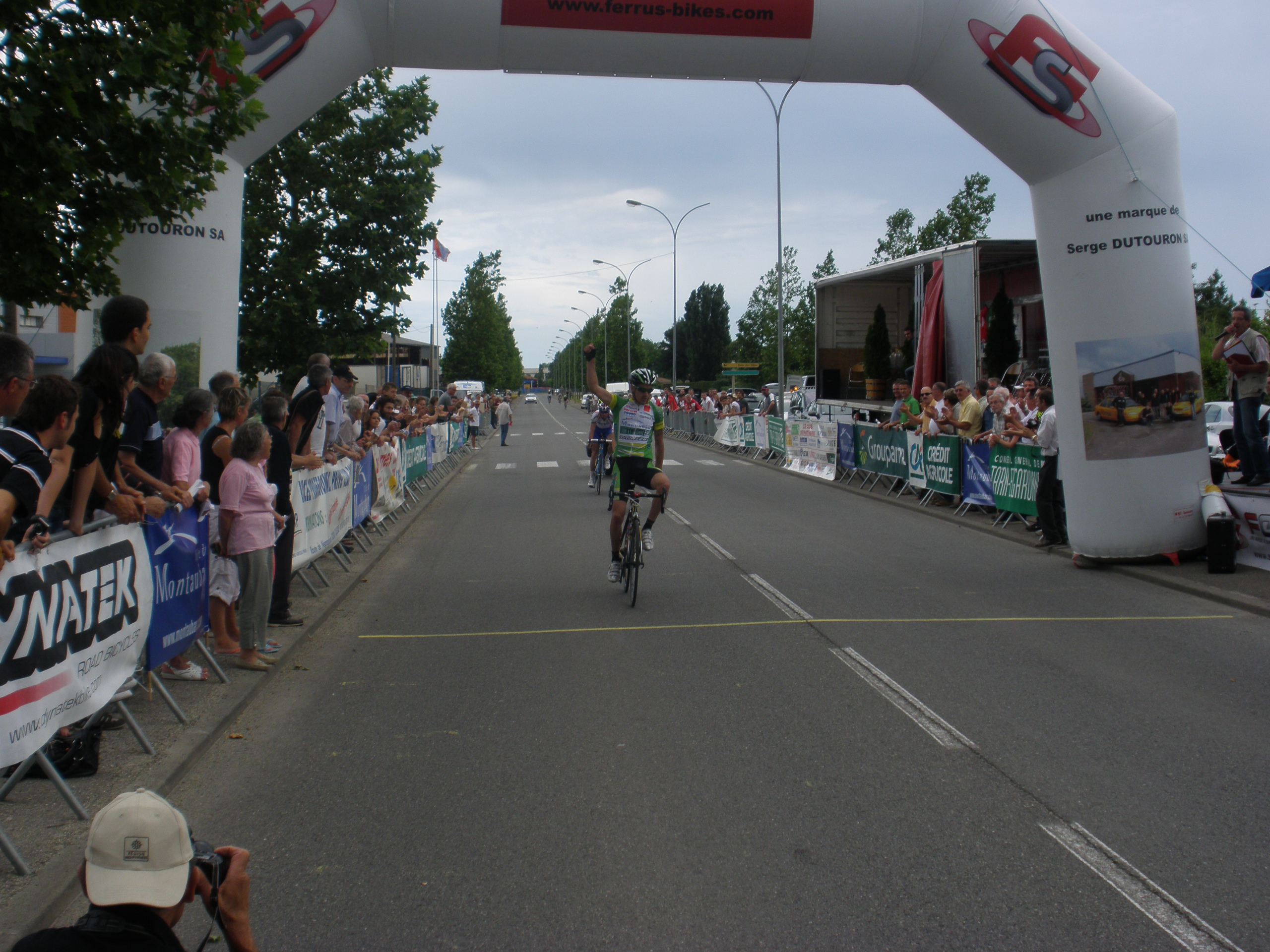

Personal information
- Full name: Carl Naibo
- Born: 17 August 1982 (age 44) Villeneuve-sur-Lot, France
- Height: 1.77 m (5 ft 10 in)
- Weight: 62 kg (137 lb)

Cycling career
- Sport: Cycling
- Current team: Retired
- Discipline: Road
- Role: Rider

Amateur team
- 2009–2011: US Montauban

Professional teams
- 2005: Bretagne–Jean Floc'h
- 2006–2007: AG2R Prévoyance
- 2008: Differdange–Apiflo Vacances

Major wins
- Stage races Tour de l'Ain (2005) Criterium des Espoirs (2.5) (2004)

Carl Naibo (born 17 August 1982 in Villeneuve-sur-Lot) is a French former professional road bicycle racer. He was tested positive to EPO in 2011 when he was riding for the amateur team of Montauban (US Montauban). Then, he was suspended for two years by French Cycling Federation.

== Major results ==
2005
1st Overall Tour de l'Ain

1st Stage 3

1st Stage 9 Tour de l'Avenir
2nd Paris–Troyes
6th Overall Route du Sud
2006
1st Mountains classification Paris–Corrèze
2008
4th Overall Boucle de l'Artois
5th Overall Rhône-Alpes Isère Tour
9th Grand Prix Cristal Energie
2010
1st Tour du Tarn-et-Garonne
