= Axel Journiaux =

French cyclist

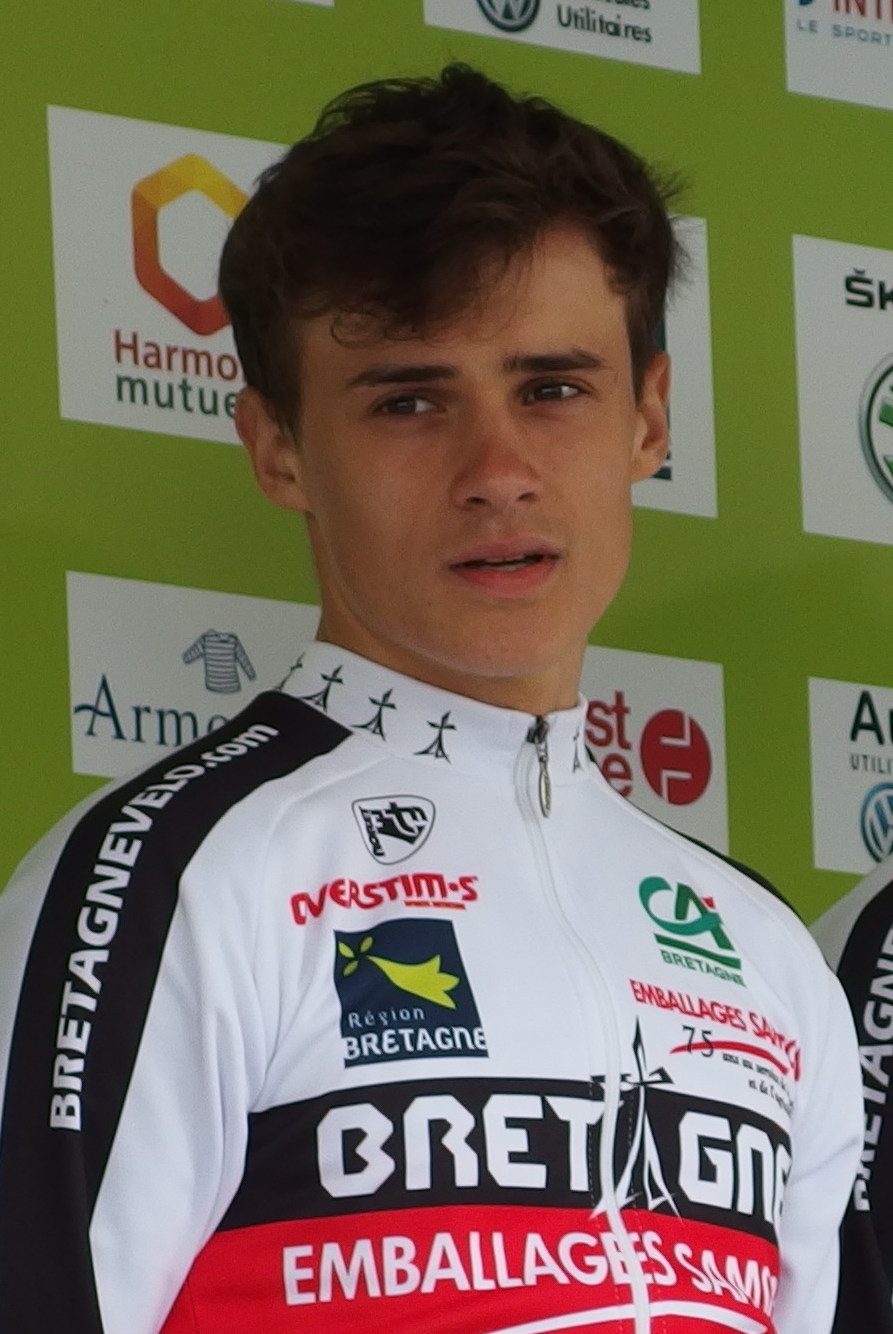
- Journiaux in 2015

Personal information
- Full name: Axel Journiaux
- Born: 20 May 1995 (age 31) Saint-Malo, France
- Height: 1.72 m (5 ft 8 in)
- Weight: 63 kg (139 lb)

Cycling career
- Sport: Cycling
- Current team: Retired
- Discipline: Road
- Role: Rider

Amateur teams
- 2012–2013: EC Rance Frémur
- 2014–2015: Pays de Dinan
- 2016–2017: Vendée U

Professional teams
- 2014: Bretagne–Séché Environnement (stagiaire)
- 2018–2019: Direct Énergie

Axel Journiaux (born 20 May 1995 in Saint-Malo) is a French former professional cyclist, who rode professionally for Total Direct Énergie in 2018 and 2019.

== Major results ==
2017
1st Stage 1 Grand Prix Priessnitz spa
3rd Overall Tour du Maroc
