= Noan Lelarge =

French cyclist

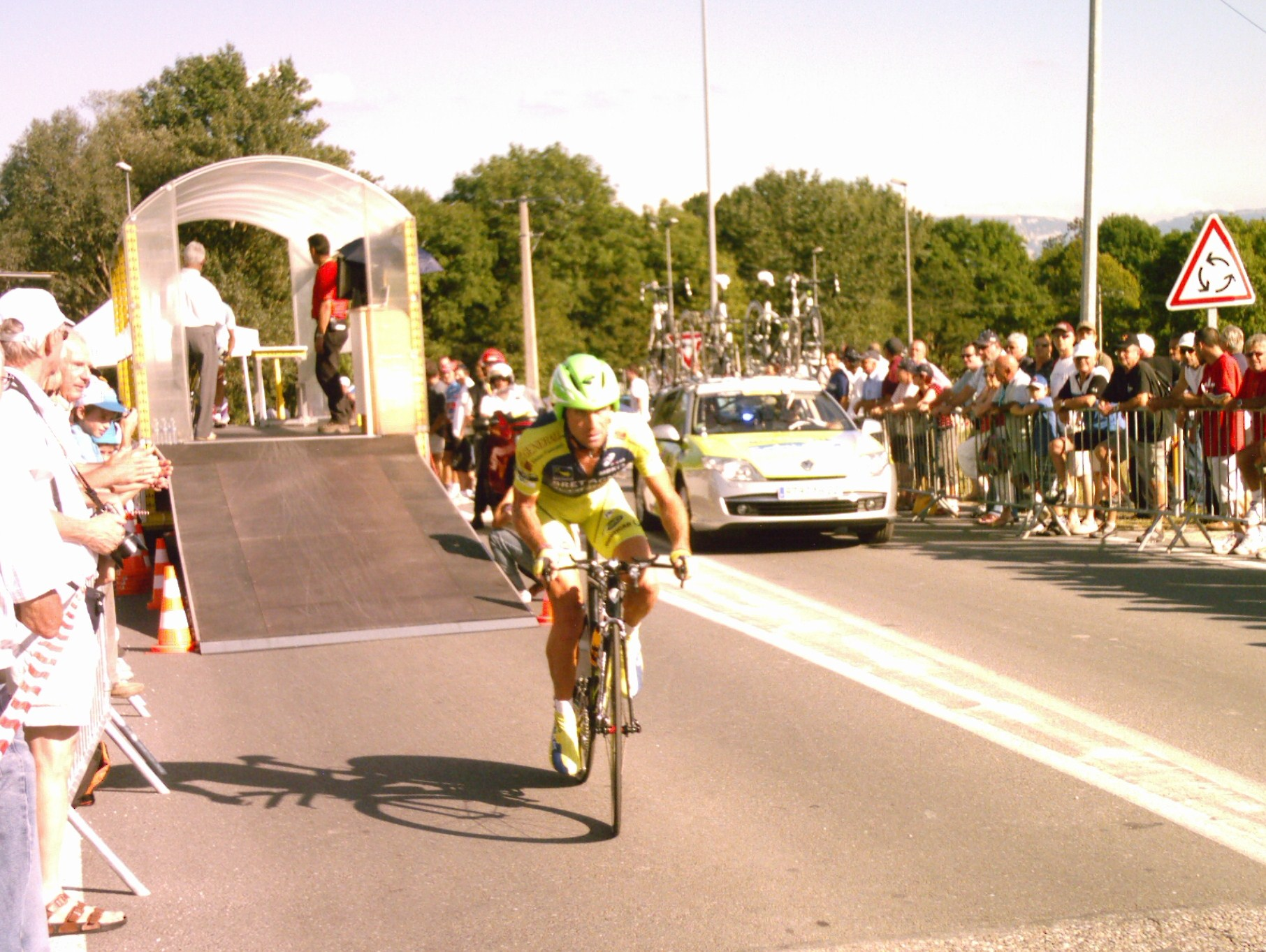

Personal information
- Born: 23 June 1975 (age 51) Romilly-sur-Seine, France

Cycling career
- Sport: Cycling
- Current team: Retired
- Discipline: Road
- Role: Rider

Amateur teams
- 2002–2004: UV Aube
- 2011: VS Hyérois

Professional teams
- 2000–2001: Bonjour
- 2005–2010: Bretagne–Jean Floc'h

Noan Lelarge (born 23 June 1975 in Romilly-sur-Seine) is a French former professional road racing cyclist. In the 2001 Giro d'Italia, Lelarge tested positive for a banned steroid, and was consequently fired by his team Bonjour.

== Major results ==
1999
2nd Overall Tour de Gironde
2002
1st Boucle de l'Artois
1st Prologue Circuit des Ardennes
2004
2nd Overall Circuit des Ardennes
2006
1st Stage 3 Tour de l'Ain
1st Stage 2 Tour du Limousin
1st Stage 2 Tour de la Somme
3rd Paris–Corrèze
2007
1st Polymultipliée lyonnaise
1st Stage 5 Tour de Normandie
2008
1st Overall Tour de la Manche
1st Stage 2 Route du Sud
3rd Time tria, National Road Championships
3rd Paris-Corrèze
2010
1st Stage 2 Circuito Montañés
