= Christophe Laborie =

French cyclist (born 1986)

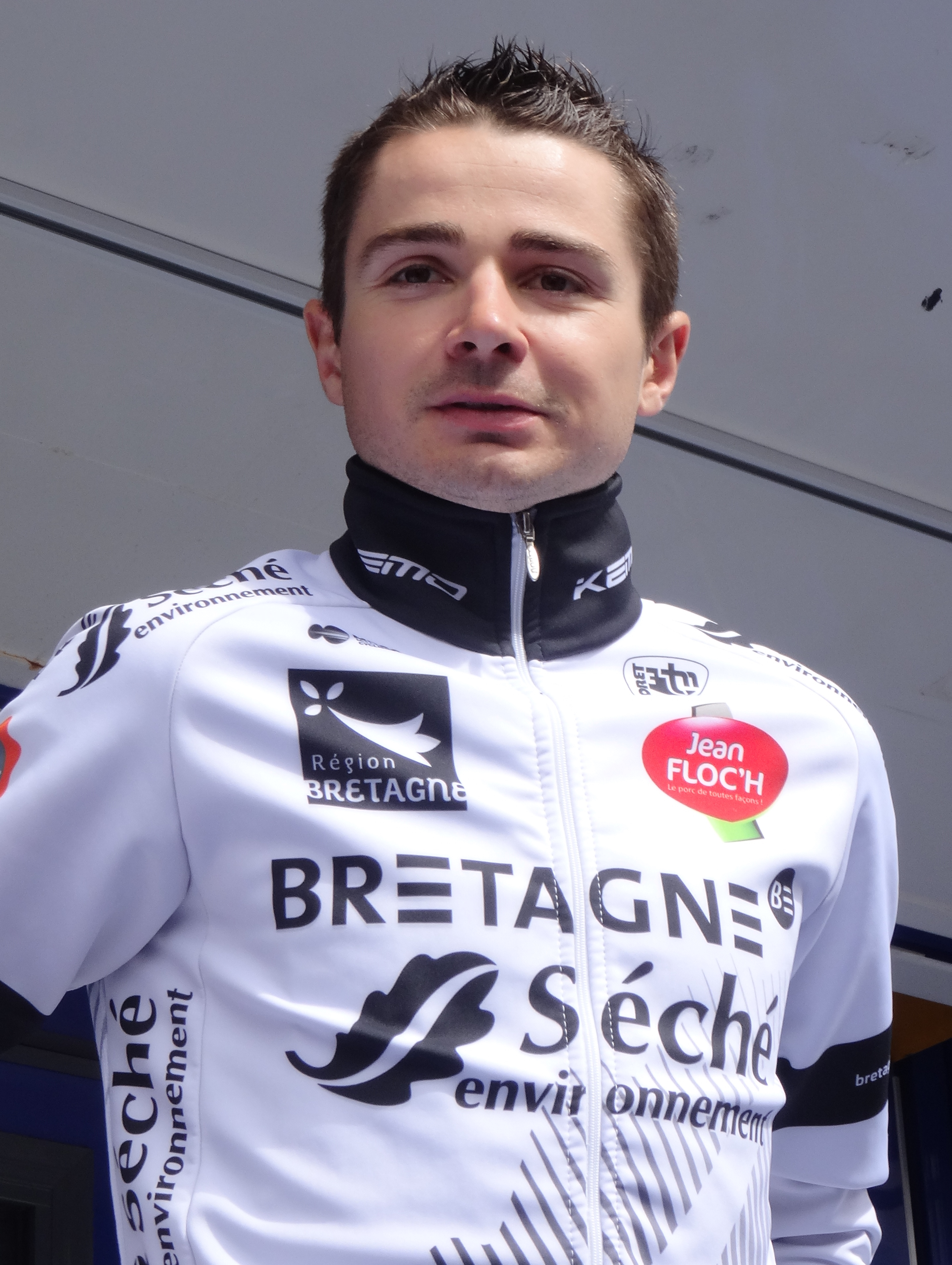
- Laborie in 2014

Personal information
- Full name: Christophe Laborie
- Born: 5 August 1986 (age 40) Aurillac, France
- Height: 1.81 m (5 ft 11 in)
- Weight: 67 kg (148 lb)

Cycling career
- Sport: Cycling
- Current team: Retired
- Discipline: Road
- Role: Rider

Amateur teams
- 2005: Espoirs Auvergne Formation
- 2006–2008: EC Montmarault-Montluçon
- 2009–2010: Sojasun Espoirs
- 2017: Team Fybolia-Bertin Locminé

Professional teams
- 2011–2013: Saur–Sojasun
- 2014–2015: Bretagne–Séché Environnement
- 2016: Delko–Marseille Provence KTM

Christophe Laborie (born 5 August 1986 in Aurillac) is a French former professional cyclist, who competed professionally between 2011 and 2016 for the Sojasun, Bretagne–Séché Environnement and Delko–Marseille Provence KTM teams.

== Major results ==
2009
1st Stage 3 Mi-Août Bretonne
2010
6th Overall Tour de Gironde
10th Val d'Ille Classic
2011
4th Clásica de Almería
2012
6th Grand Prix Pino Cerami
10th Flèche d'Emeraude
2014
6th Route Adélie
2015
4th Route Adélie
