= Gaël Malacarne =

French cyclist

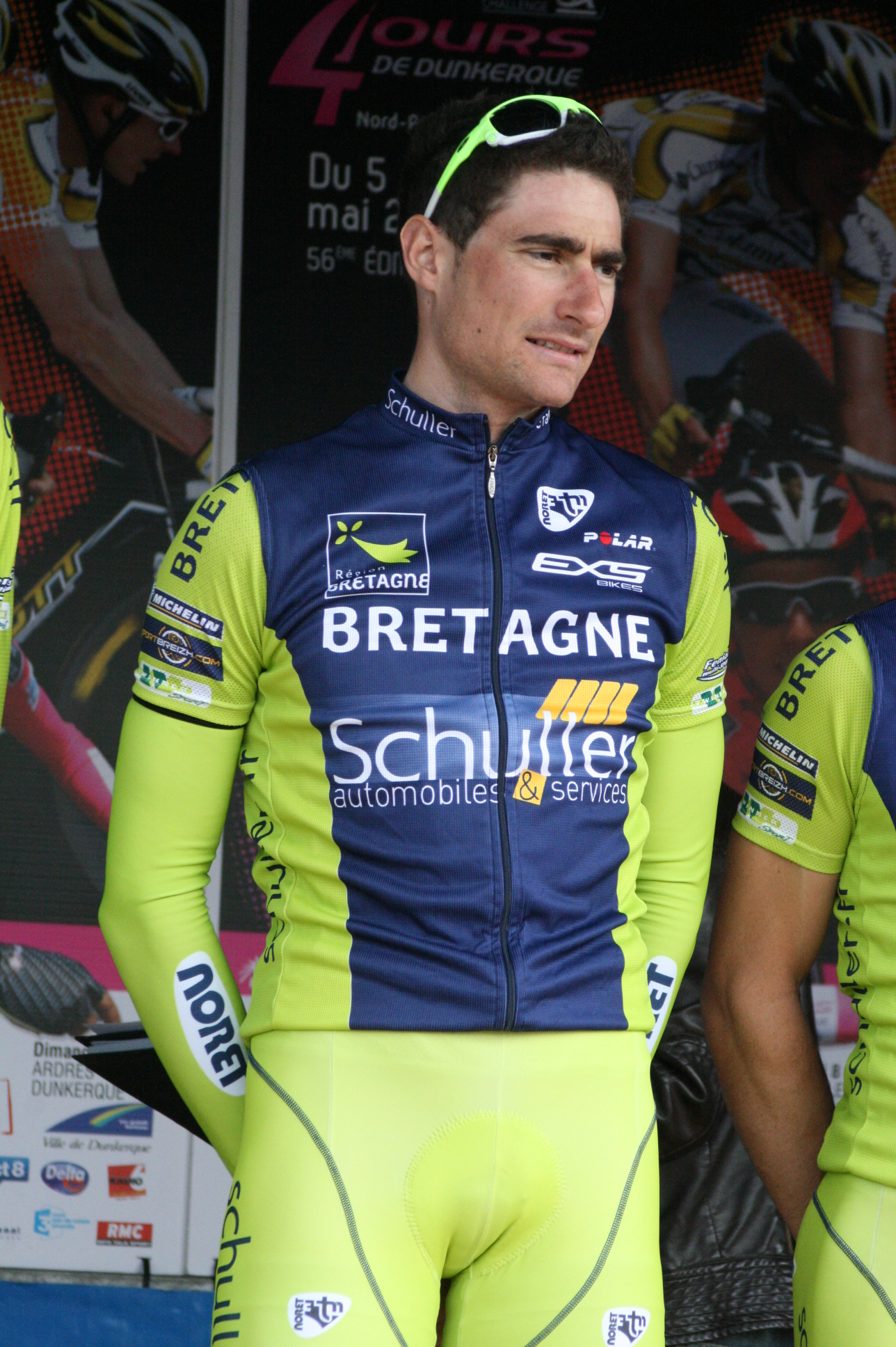

Personal information
- Born: 2 April 1986 (age 40) Saint-Brieuc, France

Cycling career
- Sport: Cycling
- Discipline: Road
- Role: Rider

Amateur team
- 2008: Bretagne–Armor Lux (stagiaire)

Professional team
- 2009–2013: Bretagne–Schuller

Gaël Malacarne (born 2 April 1986 in Saint-Brieuc) is a French racing cyclist, who last rode for UCI Professional Continental team Bretagne-Séché Environnement.

== Palmares ==
2008
1st Stage 3 Tour du Haut-Anjou
3rd Val d'Ille U Classic 35
2010
1st Stage 7 Tour de Bretagne Cycliste
1st Stage 5 Circuito Montañés
2011
1st Prologue Tour Alsace (TTT)
2012
5th Tour de Normandie
