= Arnaud Gérard =

Road bicycle racer

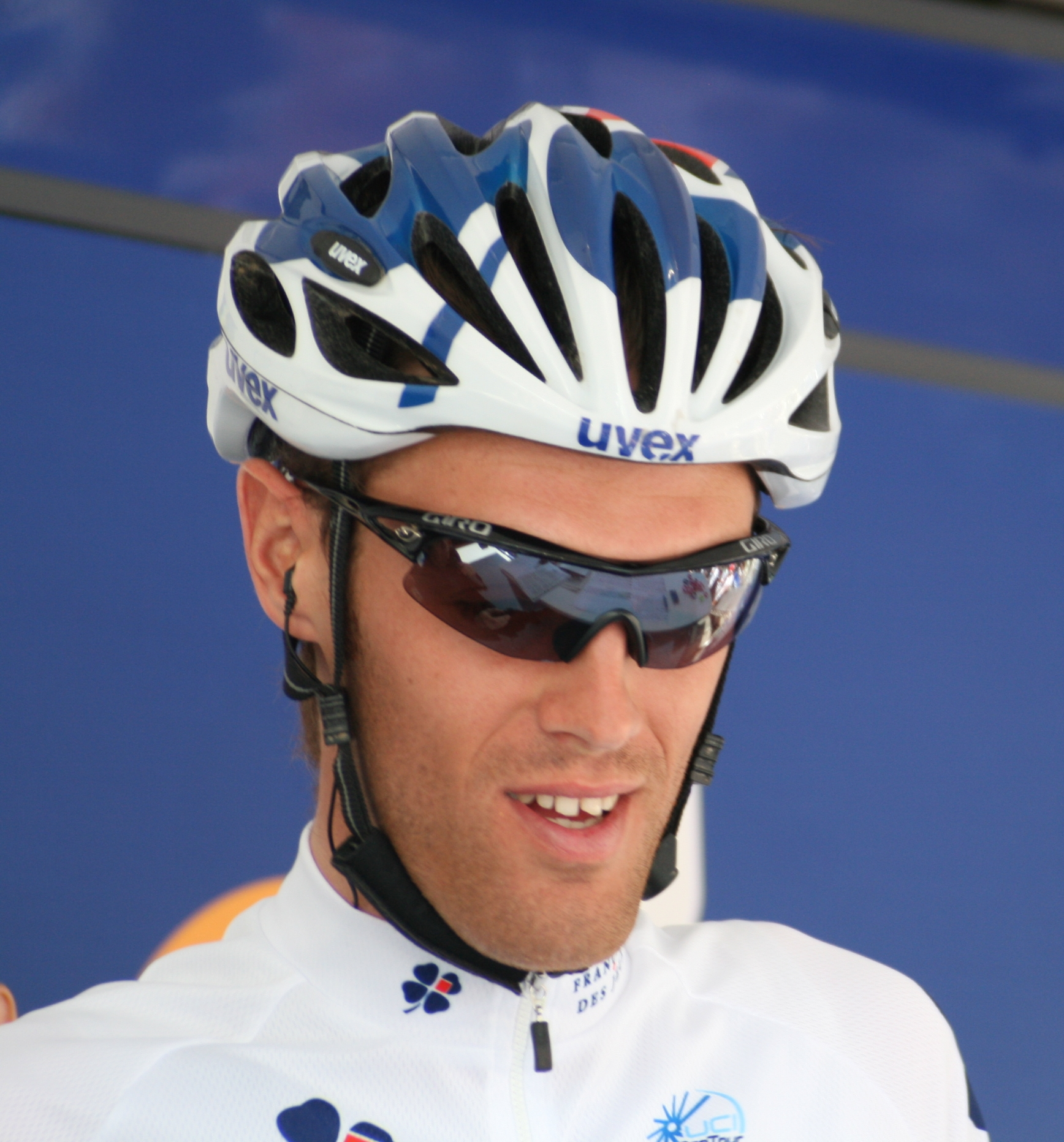
- Gérard at the 2008 Four Days of Dunkirk.

Personal information
- Full name: Arnaud Gérard
- Born: 6 October 1984 (age 42) Dinan, Côtes-d'Armor, France
- Height: 1.84 m (6 ft 0 in)
- Weight: 68 kg (150 lb)

Cycling career
- Sport: Cycling
- Current team: Arkéa–B&B Hotels
- Discipline: Road
- Role: Rider (retired); Directeur sportif
- Rider type: Domestique

Amateur teams
- 2003–2004: Cotes d'Armor
- 2003: FDJeux.com (stagiaire)
- 2004: FDJeux.com (stagiaire)

Professional teams
- 2005–2012: Française des Jeux
- 2013–2018: Bretagne–Séché Environnement

Managerial team
- 2019–: Arkéa–Samsic (directeur sportif)

Arnaud Gérard (born 6 October 1984) is a French former professional road bicycle racer, who rode professionally between 2005 and 2018 for the FDJ–BigMat and Fortuneo–Samsic teams. The cousin of former professional cyclist Cédric Hervé, Gérard won the junior road race at the 2002 UCI Road World Championships, but competed largely as a domestique as a professional – taking two victories, at the 2008 Polynormande one-day race and a stage of the 2015 Tour du Poitou-Charentes.

Following his retirement from racing, Gérard now works as a directeur sportif for the Arkéa–B&B Hotels team.

== Major results ==
2002
1st Road race, UCI Junior Road World Championships
1st Road race, National Junior Road Championships
2003
1st Stage 1 Bidasoa Itzulia
2004
3rd La Roue Tourangelle
2006
9th Polynormande
2007
8th Overall Paris–Corrèze
9th Grand Prix de la Somme
10th GP Ouest-France
2008
1st Polynormande
6th GP Ouest-France
10th Omloop Het Volk
Combativity award Stage 12 Tour de France
2009
5th Grand Prix de Plumelec-Morbihan
2010
6th Overall Étoile de Bessèges
2011
3rd Polynormande
6th GP Ouest-France
10th Paris–Tours
2012
8th Grand Prix de Plumelec-Morbihan
2013
4th Overall Tour du Poitou-Charentes
7th Route Adélie de Vitré
8th Overall Tour du Limousin
2014
2nd Duo Normand (with Anthony Delaplace)
4th Overall Boucles de la Mayenne
6th Overall Circuit de la Sarthe
7th Classic Loire Atlantique
8th Overall Tour du Poitou-Charentes
10th Coppa Bernocchi
2015
1st Stage 1 Tour du Poitou-Charentes
10th Classic Sud-Ardèche
2016
8th Duo Normand (with Anthony Delaplace)
2017
2nd Overall Ronde de l'Oise

=== Grand Tour general classification results timeline ===
| Grand Tour | 2006 | 2007 | 2008 | 2009 | 2010 | 2011 | 2012 | 2013 | 2014 | 2015 |
|---|---|---|---|---|---|---|---|---|---|---|
| Giro d'Italia | 143 | 124 | — | — | — | — | — | — | — | — |
| Tour de France | — | — | 129 | — | — | — | — | — | 132 | 133 |
| Vuelta a España | — | — | — | 105 | — | — | — | — | — | — |
