= Jean-Luc Delpech =

French cyclist (born 1979)

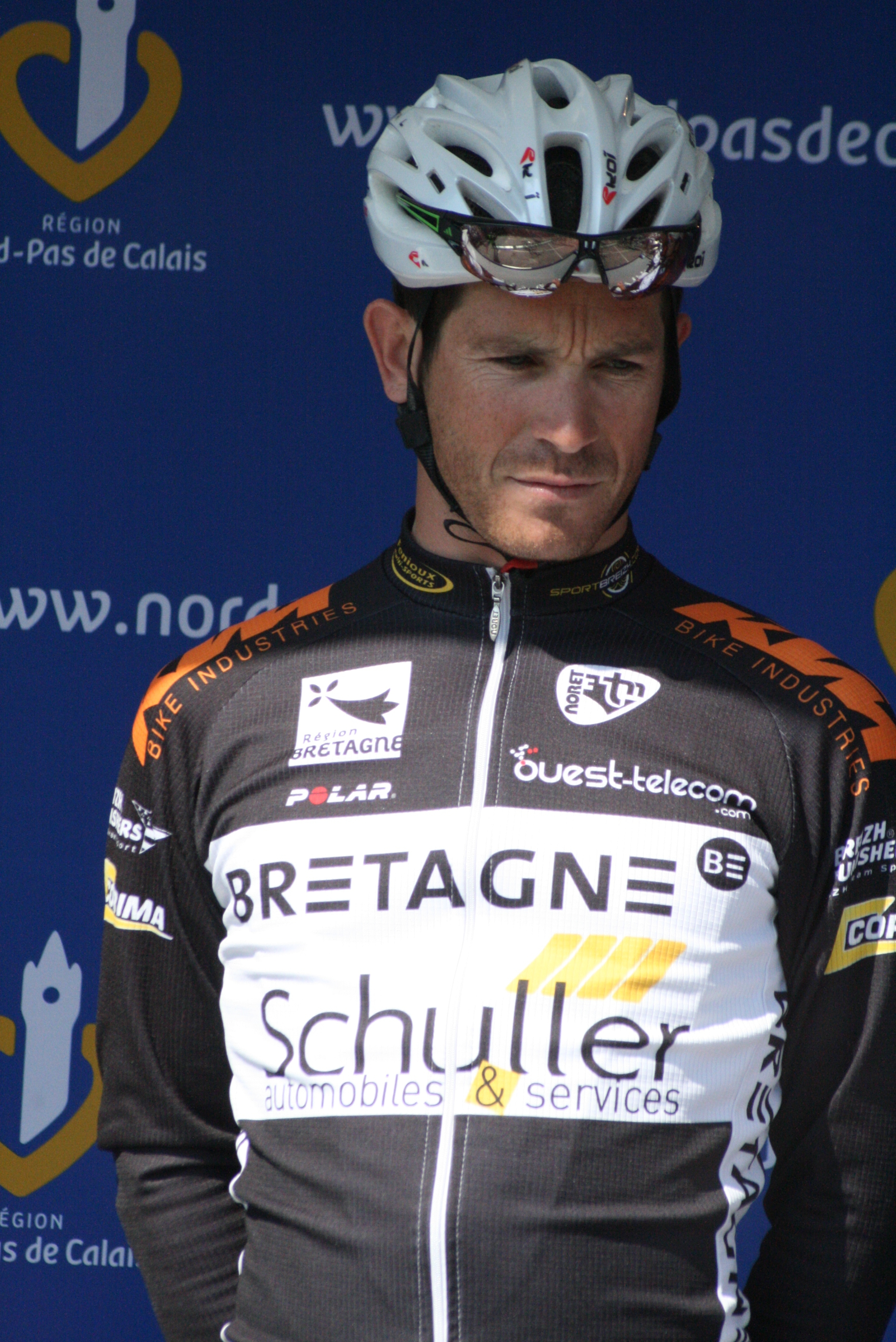

Personal information
- Full name: Jean-Luc Delpech
- Born: October 27, 1979 (age 46)

Cycling career
- Sport: Cycling
- Current team: Retired
- Discipline: Road
- Role: Rider

Amateur teams
- 2002–2003: US Montauban 82
- 2004: GS Jean Floc'h Moreac 56
- 2014: Entente Sud Gascogne
- 2015: EC Trélissac Coulounieix–Chamiers

Professional team
- 2005–2013: Bretagne–Jean Floc'h

Jean-Luc Delpech (born October 27, 1979) is a French former racing cyclist, who competed professionally between 2005 and 2013, all with the Bretagne–Séché Environnement team. He also competed for amateur squads US Montauban 82, GS Jean Floc'h Moreac 56, Entente Sud Gascogne, and EC Trélissac Coulounieix–Chamiers.

== Career highlights ==
2003
1st, Stage 1, Tour des Pyrénées
2nd, Overall, Cinturo de l'Emporada
2004
3rd, Overall, Boucles de la Mayenne
2005
3rd, Circuit de la Nive
2006
1st, Stage 3, Tour du Faso, Ouagadougou
2nd, Circuit de la Nive
3rd, Prix d'Automne, Rôchefoucault
2007
1st, Tour du Tarn-et-Garonne
2008
1st, Stage 5, La Tropicale Amissa Bongo, Libreville
2010
1st, Boucles de l'Aulne
1st, Mi-Août Bretonne
2012
1st Overall, Ronde de l'Oise

1st, Stage 4

2013
2nd, Grand Prix de la Somme
10th, Grand Prix Pino Cerami
