= Anthony Delaplace =

French road cyclist (born 1989)

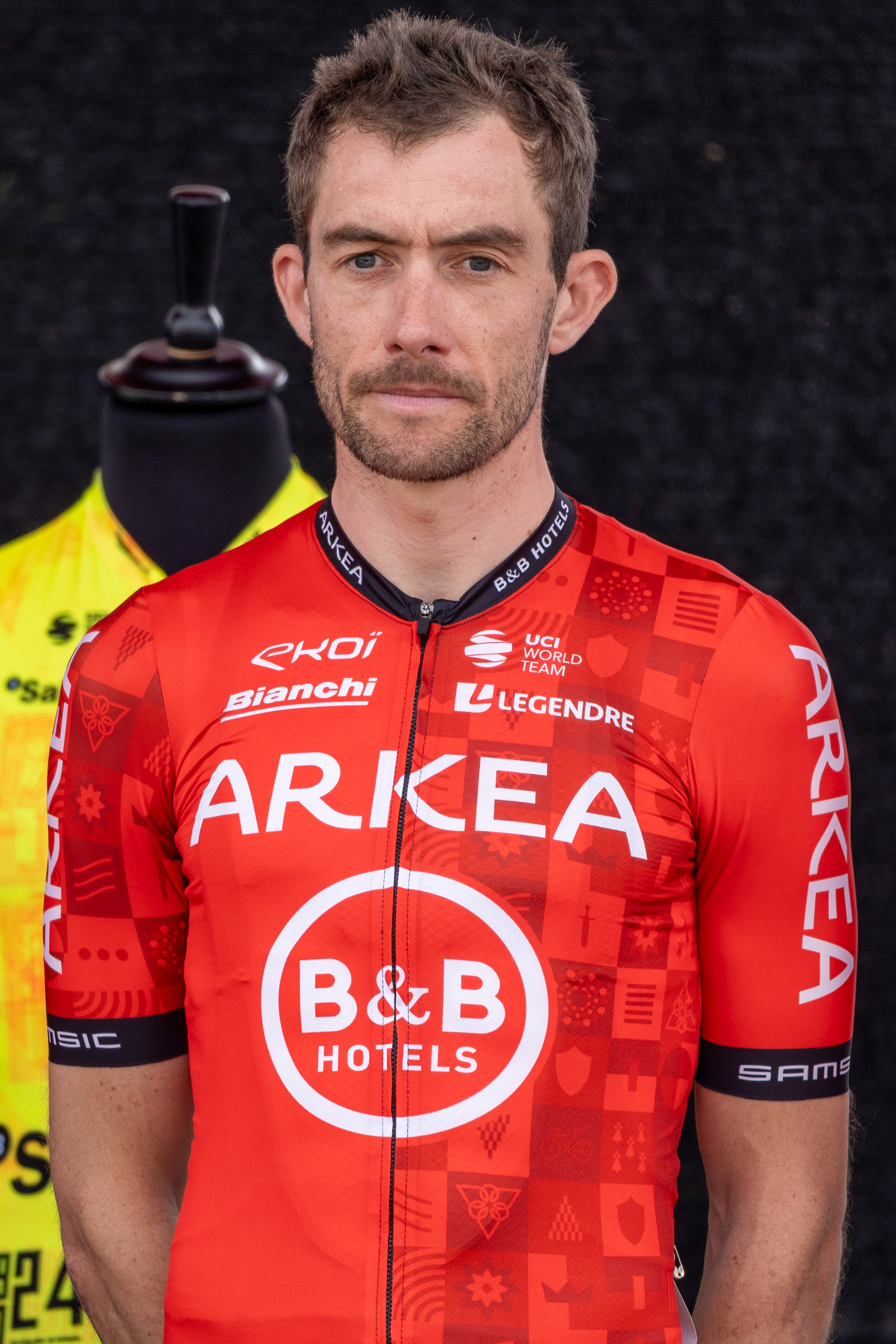
- Delaplace in Espelette, 2024 Itzulia.

Personal information
- Full name: Anthony Delaplace
- Born: 11 September 1989 (age 37) Valognes, France
- Height: 1.81 m (5 ft 11 1/2 in)
- Weight: 65 kg (143 lb; 10 st 3 lb)

Cycling career
- Sport: Cycling
- Current team: Arkéa–B&B Hotels
- Disciplines: Road; Gravel
- Role: Rider
- Rider type: Rouleur

Amateur teams
- 2002–2007: AS Tourlaville
- 2008–2009: Super Sport 35–ACNC
- 2009: Besson Chaussures–Sojasun (stagiaire)

Professional teams
- 2010–2013: Saur–Sojasun
- 2014–: Bretagne–Séché Environnement

Anthony Delaplace (born 11 September 1989) is a French professional cyclist, who rides for UCI WorldTeam Arkéa–B&B Hotels. During his professional career, Delaplace has taken victories at the 2011 Polynormande for Saur–Sojasun and the 2022 Paris–Camembert for Arkéa–Samsic.

== Career ==
Delaplace was a junior champion for France in 2007. He made his Grand Tour debut in the 2011 Tour de France, where he was the youngest rider in the competition, and finished 135th in the general classification.

Delaplace left Sojasun at the end of the 2013 season, and joined Bretagne–Séché Environnement for the 2014 season.

== Major results ==
2007
1st Road race, National Junior Road Championships
2009
3rd Road race, National Under-23 Road Championships
10th Overall Tour du Haut-Anjou
2010
1st Stage 2 Tour de l'Avenir
6th Overall Grand Prix du Portugal
9th Paris–Troyes
2011 (1 pro win)
1st Polynormande
2nd Boucles de l'Aulne
2nd La Roue Tourangelle
4th Grand Prix Pino Cerami
8th Overall Tour de Bretagne
2012
1st Young rider classification, Étoile de Bessèges
2nd Paris–Troyes
4th Overall Circuit de la Sarthe
10th Tour du Finistère
2013
9th Overall Tour du Limousin

1st Young rider classification

10th Chrono des Nations
2014
2nd Duo Normand (with Arnaud Gérard)
5th Overall Circuit de la Sarthe
8th Polynormande
9th Overall Boucles de la Mayenne

1st Sprints classification

2015
2nd Grand Prix de la Somme
3rd Classic Loire Atlantique
4th Overall Tour de Bretagne
4th Polynormande
9th Overall La Tropicale Amissa Bongo
Combativity award Stage 7 Tour de France
2016
2nd Overall Boucles de la Mayenne
2nd Paris–Camembert
3rd Overall La Tropicale Amissa Bongo
8th Duo Normand (with Arnaud Gérard)
9th Overall Étoile de Bessèges
10th Tour du Doubs
Combativity award Stage 1 Tour de France
2017
1st Overall Tour de Normandie

1st Stage 1

1st Duo Normand (with Pierre-Luc Périchon)
3rd La Roue Tourangelle
6th Overall Giro di Toscana
9th Chrono des Nations
10th Overall Tour de l'Ain
10th Classic Sud-Ardèche
2018
1st Mountains classification, Boucles de la Mayenne
4th Route Adélie de Vitré
4th Duo Normand (with Pierre-Luc Périchon)
7th Coppa Agostoni
8th Overall Tour du Jura
9th Overall Circuit de la Sarthe
2019
6th Duo Normand (with Thibault Guernalec)
7th Overall Four Days of Dunkirk
7th Boucles de l'Aulne
8th Polynormande
9th Tro-Bro Léon
10th Overall Tour du Limousin
2020
6th Overall Tour du Limousin
8th Prueba Villafranca de Ordizia
2021
2nd Overall Tour de Bretagne
2nd Trofeo Calvia
6th Overall Tour Poitou-Charentes en Nouvelle-Aquitaine
9th Classic Loire Atlantique
10th Prueba Villafranca de Ordizia
10th Polynormande
2022 (1)
1st Paris–Camembert
5th Overall Vuelta a Castilla y León
9th Chrono des Nations
10th Overall Tour de l'Ain
10th Prueba Villafranca de Ordizia
2024
6th Polynormande

=== Grand Tour general classification results timeline ===
Grand Tour	2011	2012	2013	2014	2015	2016	2017	2018	2019	2020	2021	2022	2023
Giro d'Italia	Has not contested during his career												
Tour de France	135	DNF	89	78	85	90	—	—	90	—	DNF	—	68
Vuelta a España	—	—	—	—	—	—	—	—	—	—	—	DNF	—

Legend
—	Did not compete
DNF	Did not finish
