= Armindo Fonseca =

French cyclist (born 1989)

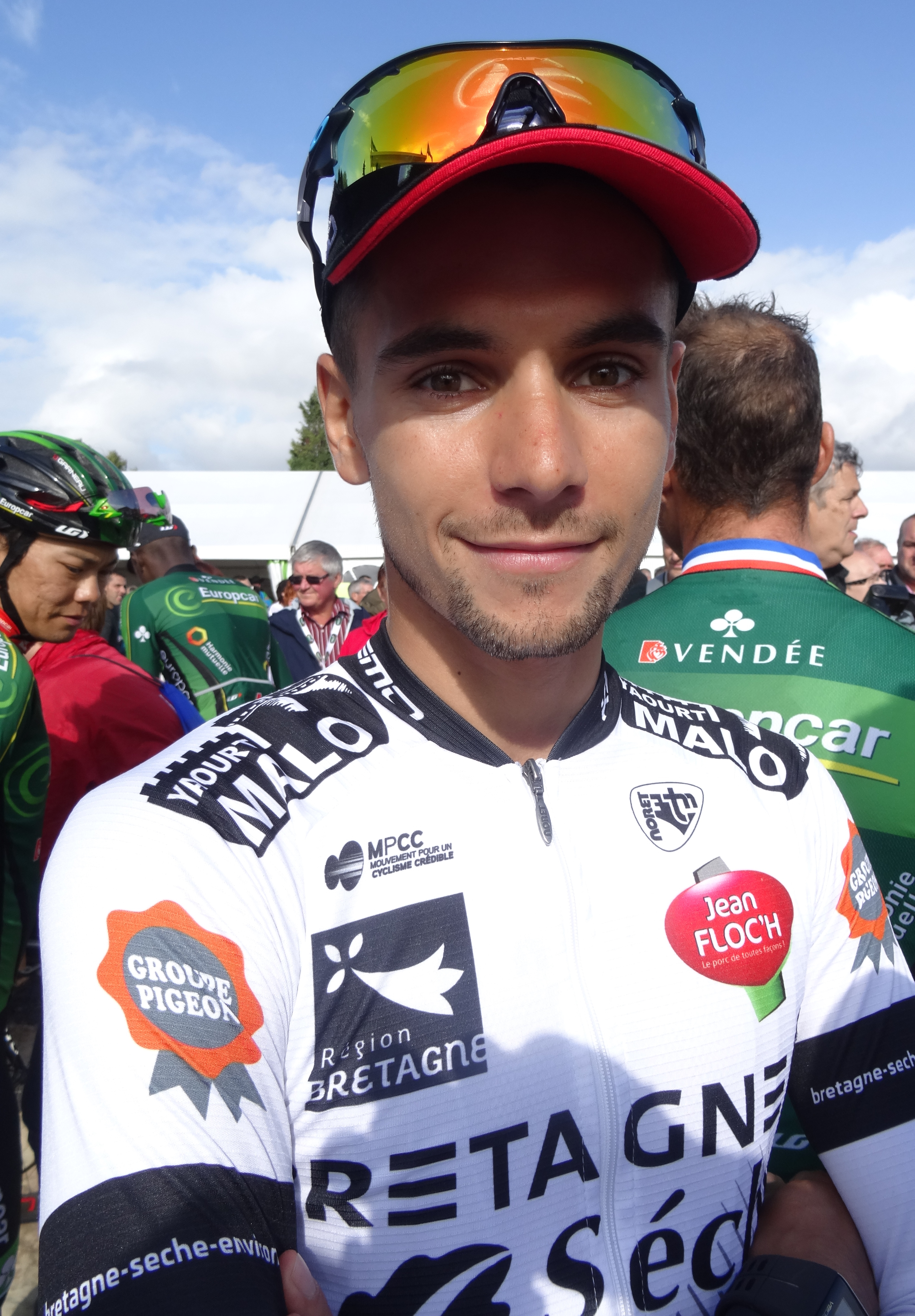
- Fonseca in 2014

Personal information
- Born: 1 May 1989 (age 37) Rennes, France
- Height: 1.68 m (5 ft 6 in)
- Weight: 58 kg (128 lb; 9.1 st)

Cycling career
- Sport: Cycling
- Current team: Retired
- Discipline: Road
- Role: Rider

Amateur team
- 2007–2010: Côtes d'Armor

Professional team
- 2011–2018: Bretagne–Schuller

Armindo Fonseca (born 1 May 1989) is a French former racing cyclist, who rode professionally for the Fortuneo–Samsic team – through various team names – from 2011 to 2018. During his career, Fonseca took two professional victories, both of which came in 2014, with a stage win at the Boucles de la Mayenne and a win in the Tour de Vendée one-day race. He also competed in the Tour de France on three occasions – in 2014, 2015 and 2016.

== Major results ==
2010
9th Overall Kreiz Breizh Elites
2011
2nd Tour du Finistère
2012
4th Tour de Vendée
7th Tour du Finistère
2013
2nd Circuito de Getxo
3rd Boucles de l'Aulne
4th Grand Prix de la Ville de Lillers
5th Overall Four Days of Dunkirk
8th Grand Prix de Plumelec-Morbihan
2014
1st Tour de Vendée
3rd Tour du Finistère
3rd Grand Prix de Plumelec-Morbihan
4th Overall Tour du Haut Var
5th Overall Boucles de la Mayenne

1st Stage 1

5th La Drôme Classic
2015
5th Grand Prix de Fourmies
7th GP Ouest-France
8th Grand Prix de Plumelec-Morbihan
9th Duo Normand (with Benoît Jarrier)
2016
5th Overall La Tropicale Amissa Bongo
6th Route Adélie de Vitré
9th Cholet-Pays de Loire
10th Tour du Finistère
2017
4th Paris–Camembert
6th Paris–Bourges
9th Route Adélie de Vitré
2018
3rd Classic Loire-Atlantique
8th Overall Ronde de l'Oise
9th Cholet-Pays de la Loire

=== Grand Tour general classification results timeline ===
Grand Tour	2014	2015	2016
Giro d'Italia	—	—	—
Tour de France	138	119	146
Vuelta a España	—	—	—

Legend
—	Did not compete
DNF	Did not finish
