= Polynormande =

Bicycle race event in France

Race details
- Date: Early August
- Region: Normandy, France
- English name: Polynormand
- Local name: Polynormande (in French)
- Discipline: Road race
- Competition: UCI Europe Tour; French Road Cycling Cup
- Type: Single-day
- Web site: www.polynormande.com

History
- First edition: 1980
- Editions: 46 (as of 20265)
- First winner: Bernard Thévenet (FRA)
- Most wins: Richard Virenque (FRA) (2 wins)
- Most recent: Hugo Page (FRA)

The Polynormande is a single-day road bicycle race held annually in August in the region of Normandy, France. Between 1980 and 2002 it was a criterium. Since 2003, the race is organized as a 1.1 event on the UCI Europe Tour, also being part of the French Road Cycling Cup.

== Winners ==
Year	Country	Rider	Team
1980	France	Bernard Thévenet	Teka
1981	Belgium	Lucien Van Impe	Boston–Mavic
1982	France	Bernard Hinault	Renault–Elf
1983	France	Marc Madiot	Renault–Elf
1984	France	Vincent Barteau	Renault–Elf
1985	Belgium	Claude Criquielion	Hitachi–Splendor
1986	France	Jean-René Bernaudeau	Fagor
1987	France	Marc Madiot	Système U
1988	France	Philippe Bouvatier	BH
1989	France	Laurent Fignon	Super U-Raleigh
1990	France	Thierry Claveyrolat	RMO
1991	France	Thierry Marie	Castorama
1992	France	Jean-François Bernard	Banesto
1993	Switzerland	Tony Rominger	CLAS–Cajastur
1994	Uzbekistan	Djamolidine Abdoujaparov	Team Polti–Vaporetto
1995	France	Richard Virenque	Festina–Lotus
1996	France	Laurent Brochard	Festina–Lotus
1997	France	Richard Virenque	Festina–Lotus
1998	France	Stéphane Heulot	Française des Jeux
1999	Switzerland	Laurent Dufaux	Saeco–Cannondale
2000	France	Pascal Hervé	Team Polti
2001	France	Laurent Jalabert	CSC–Tiscali
2002	France	Nicolas Vogondy	Française des Jeux
2003	France	Jérôme Pineau	Brioches La Boulangère
2004	France	Sylvain Chavanel	Brioches La Boulangère
2005	Belgium	Philippe Gilbert	Française des Jeux
2006	France	Anthony Charteau	Crédit Agricole
2007	France	Benoît Vaugrenard	Française des Jeux
2008	France	Arnaud Gérard	Française des Jeux
2009	France	Matthieu Ladagnous	Française des Jeux
2010	Belgium	Andy Cappelle	Verandas Willems
2011	France	Anthony Delaplace	Saur–Sojasun
2012	France	Tony Hurel	Team Europcar
2013	Portugal	José Gonçalves	La Pomme Marseille
2014	Belgium	Jan Ghyselinck	Wanty–Groupe Gobert
2015	Belgium	Oliver Naesen	Topsport Vlaanderen–Baloise
2016	Belgium	Baptiste Planckaert	Wallonie-Bruxelles–Group Protect
2017	France	Alexis Gougeard	AG2R La Mondiale
2018	France	Pierre-Luc Périchon	Fortuneo–Samsic
2019	France	Benoît Cosnefroy	AG2R La Mondiale
2020	No race due to COVID-19 pandemic in France		
2021	France	Valentin Madouas	Groupama–FDJ
2022	France	Franck Bonnamour	B&B Hotels–KTM
2023	Belgium	Arnaud De Lie	Lotto–Dstny
2024	France	Paul Lapeira	Decathlon–AG2R La Mondiale
2025	France	Nicolas Prodhomme	Decathlon–AG2R La Mondiale
2026	France	Hugo Page	Cofidis
