= Sébastien Duret =

French cyclist

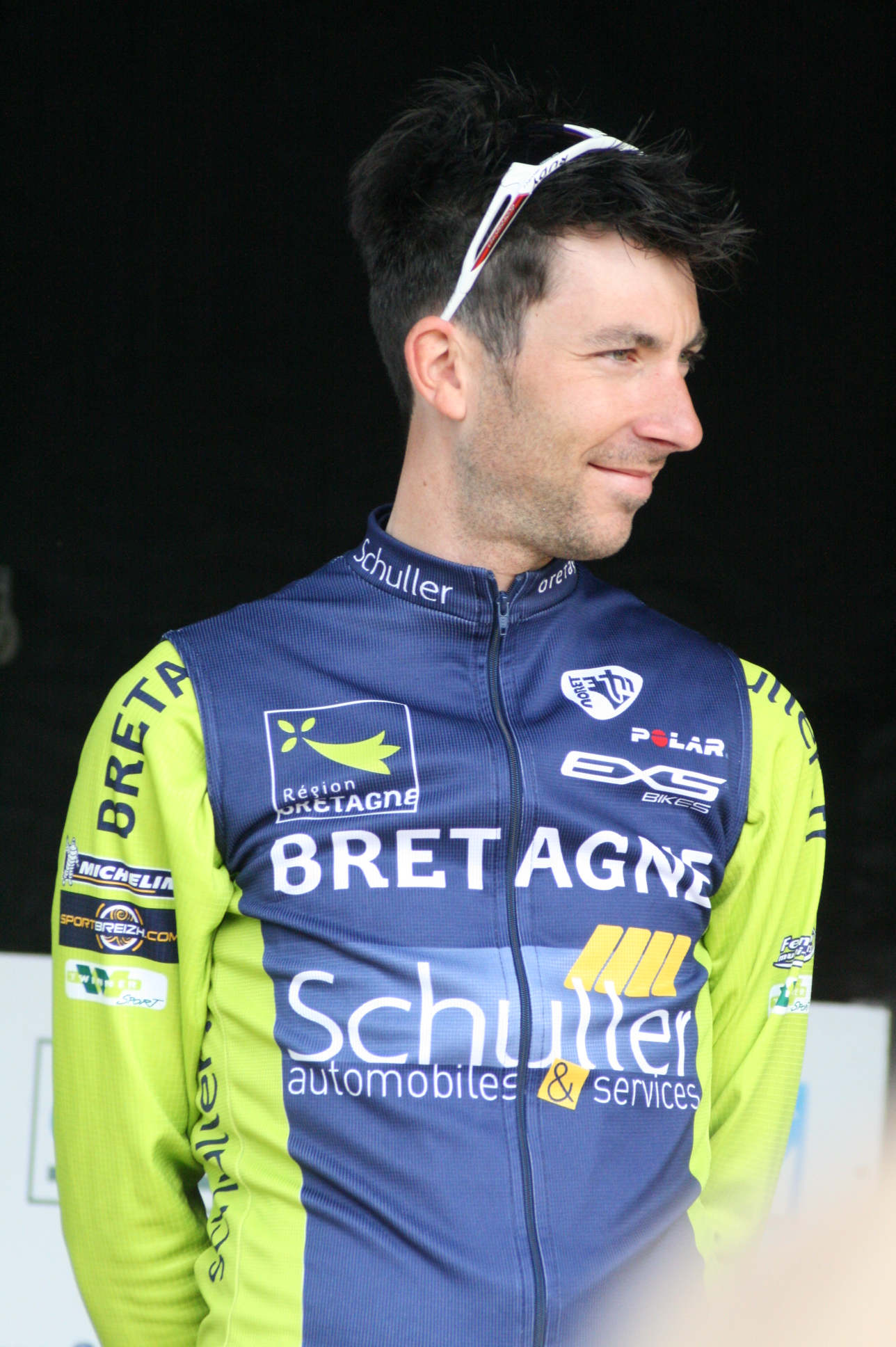

Personal information
- Born: 3 September 1980 (age 46) Cholet, France

Cycling career
- Sport: Cycling
- Discipline: Road
- Role: Rider

Professional team
- 2005-2013: Bretagne-Jean Floc'h

Sébastien Duret (born 3 September 1980, in Cholet) is a former French racing cyclist.

== Palmares ==
2003
2nd Tour de Gironde
2nd Tour de Seine-Maritime
2004
1st stage 5 Tour du Loir-et-Cher
1st Boucles de la Mayenne

1st stage 1

2nd Boucles de la Soule
3rd Boucles de la Loire
2005
3rd Grand Prix de Rennes
2006
1st Boucles Guégonnaises
2nd Boucles de la Soule
2nd Ronde du Pays Basque
2007
1st Manche-Atlantique
3rd Tour du Doubs
3rd Polymultipliée Lyonnaise
2008
2nd Manche-Atlantique
2009
1st stage 3 Four Days of Dunkirk
2010
1st stage 2 Rhône-Alpes Isère Tour
2013
3rd Tour du Gevaudan Languedoc-Roussillon

1st stage 2
