= Val d'Ille Classic =

Road bicycle race in France

Race details
- Date: April
- Region: La Mézière, France
- Discipline: Road race
- Competition: UCI Europe Tour
- Type: One day race
- Web site: www.rayonsduvaldille.fr

History
- First edition: 2001
- Editions: 13
- Final edition: 2013
- First winner: Julien Roussel (FRA)
- Most wins: No repeat winners
- Final winner: Nacer Bouhanni (FRA)

The Val d'Ille U Classic 35 was a road bicycle race held annually in France. It was organized as a 1.2 event on the UCI Europe Tour from 2010 until 2012, and as a 1.1 for its final edition in 2013. The event was last held in 2013. It was part of UCI Europe Tour in category 1.2 from 2010 to 2012, when it upgraded to 1.1 in 2013.

== Winners ==
Year	Country	Rider	Team
2001	France	Julien Roussel	
2002	France	Freddy Bichot	
2003	France	Alexandre Urbain	
2004	France	Cyril Vitry	
2005	France	Guillaume Duval	
2006	France	Cédric Hervé	Bretagne–Jean Floc'h
2007	Belgium	David Piva	
2008	France	Mickaël Renou	
2009	France	Yannick Martinez	Creusot Cyclisme
2010	France	Jimmy Casper	Saur–Sojasun
2011	France	Guillaume Louyest	
2012	France	Eric Berthou	Bretagne–Schuller
2013	France	Nacer Bouhanni	FDJ
