= Paris–Corrèze =

Race details
- Date: Early-August
- Region: Limousin, France
- English name: Paris–Corrèze
- Local name(s): Paris–Corrèze (in French)
- Discipline: Road
- Competition: UCI Europe Tour
- Type: Stage-race
- Web site: www.pariscorreze.fr

History
- First edition: 2001
- Editions: 12
- Final edition: 2012
- First winner: Thor Hushovd (NOR)
- Final winner: Egoitz García (ESP)

Paris–Corrèze was a road bicycle race held annually in France, usually between a department near Paris and the department of Corrèze. It was created by Laurent Fignon and Max Mamers. It was first held in 2001 and since 2005 it has been organised as a 2.1 event on the UCI Europe Tour. The last edition was 2012 as budgetary problems caused the race to disappear after 2013.

== Winners ==
| Year | Country | Rider | Team |
|---|---|---|---|
| 2001 | Norway | Thor Hushovd | Crédit Agricole |
| 2002 | Australia | Baden Cooke | Française des Jeux |
| 2003 | France | Cédric Vasseur | Cofidis |
| 2004 | Belgium | Philippe Gilbert | FDJeux.com |
| 2005 | France | Frédéric Finot | Française des Jeux |
| 2006 | France | Didier Rous | Bouygues Télécom |
| 2007 | Norway | Edvald Boasson Hagen | Maxbo–Bianchi |
| 2008 | Japan | Miyataka Shimizu | Meitan Hompo-GDR |
| 2009 | Spain | Francisco Ventoso | Carmiooro A Style |
| 2010 | France | Mickaël Buffaz | Cofidis |
| 2011 | France | Samuel Dumoulin | Cofidis |
| 2012 | Spain | Egoitz García | Cofidis |
