= Boucles de la Mayenne =

French multi-day road cycling race

Race details
- Date: May or June
- Region: Mayenne, Pays de la Loire
- English name: Bends of the Mayenne (river)
- Local name(s): Boucles de la Mayenne (in French)
- Discipline: Road
- Competition: UCI Europe Tour
- Type: Stage-race
- Web site: www.bouclesdelamayenne.fr

History
- First edition: 1975
- Editions: 49 (as of 2024)
- First winner: Alain Meslet (FRA)
- Most wins: Serge Coquelin (FRA) (3 wins)
- Most recent: Alberto Bettiol (ITA)

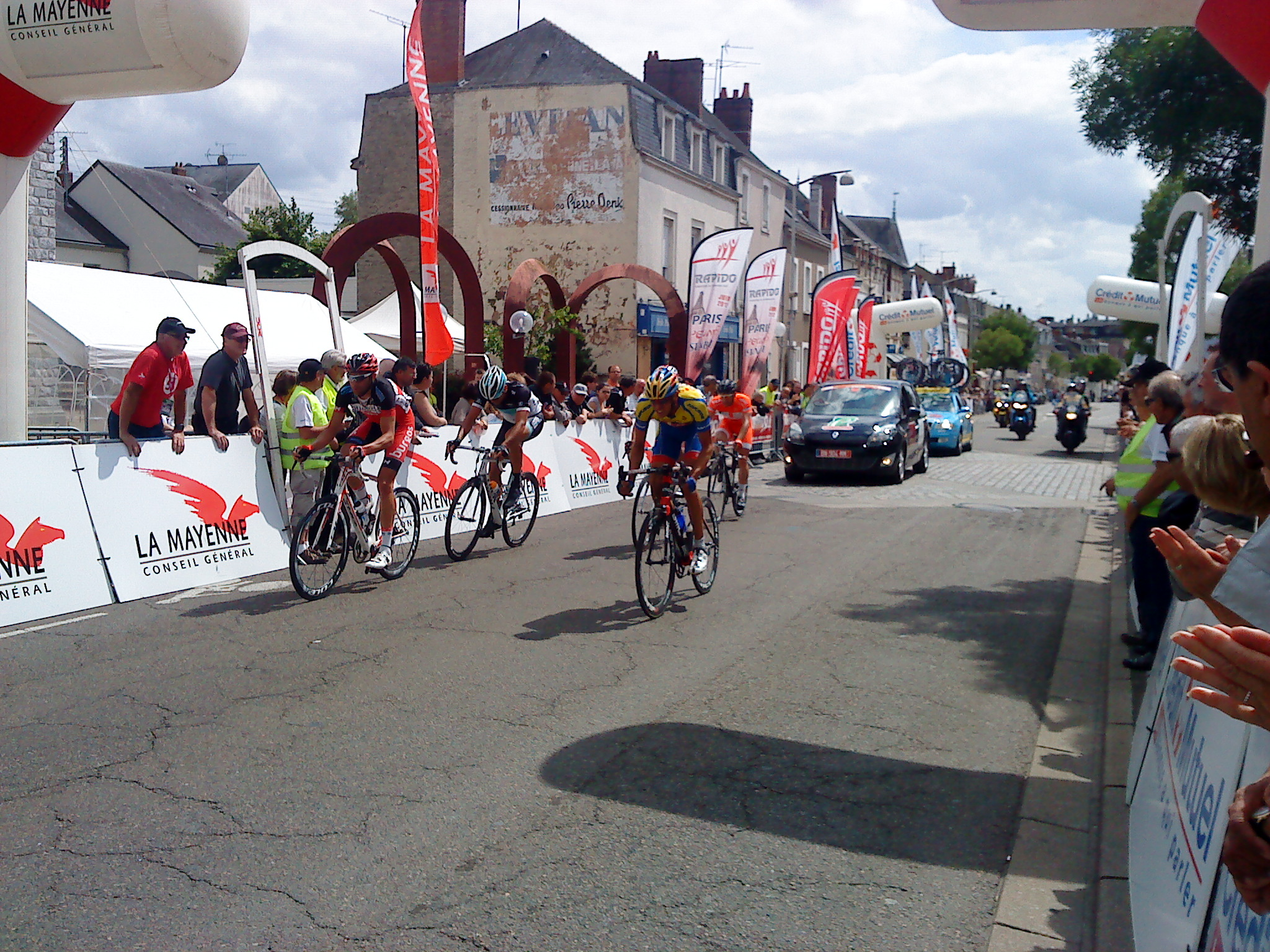
2012 Boucles de la Mayenne in Laval

The Boucles de la Mayenne is a road bicycle race held annually in the Mayenne department and Pays de la Loire region in France. It was first held in 1975 and from 2006 until 2019, it was organised as a 2.1 event on the UCI Europe Tour. The race became part of the new UCI ProSeries in 2020, although that year's edition was cancelled due to the COVID-19 pandemic in France.

== Winners ==
Year	Country	Rider	Team
1975	France	Alain Meslet	
1976	France	Patrice Testier	
1977	France	Patrick Guay	
1978	France	Marc Gomez	
1979	France	Marc Madiot	
1980	France	Serge Coquelin	
1981	France	René Tremblay	
1982	France	Serge Coquelin	
1983	France	Hubert Graignic	
1984	France	Serge Coquelin	
1985	France	Zbigniew Krasniak	
1986	France	Gaëtan Leray	
1987	France	Philippe Dalibard	
1988	France	Laurent Bezault	
1989	France	Philippe Dalibard	
1990	France	Jean-Cyril Robin	
1991	France	Pascal Basset	
1992	France	Pascal Hervé	
1993	France	David Derique	
1994	France	Gérald Bigot	
1995	France	Stéphane Conan	
1996	France	David Delrieu	
1997	France	Christophe Thébault	
1998	France	Martial Locatelli	
1999	France	Stéphane Pétilleau	
2000	France	Stéphane Pétilleau	
2001	France	Arnaud Chauveau	
2002	France	Freddy Bichot	Française des Jeux
2003	Switzerland	Sandro Güttinger	
2004	France	Sébastien Duret	
2005	Belarus	Aleksandr Kuschynski	Amore & Vita–Beretta
2006	Japan	Koji Fukushima	Cycle Racing Team Vang
2007	France	Nicolas Vogondy	Agritubel
2008	France	Freddy Bichot	Agritubel
2009	Estonia	Janek Tombak	Cycling Club Burgas
2010	France	Jérémie Galland	Saur–Sojasun
2011	France	Jimmy Casper	Saur–Sojasun
2012	France	Laurent Pichon	Bretagne–Schuller
2013	Canada	David Veilleux	Team Europcar
2014	France	Stéphane Rossetto	BigMat–Auber 93
2015	France	Anthony Turgis	Cofidis
2016	France	Bryan Coquard	Direct Énergie
2017	Netherlands	Mathieu van der Poel	Beobank–Corendon
2018	Netherlands	Mathieu van der Poel	Corendon–Circus
2019	France	Thibault Ferasse	Natura4Ever–Roubaix–Lille Métropole
2020	No race due to the COVID-19 pandemic in France		
2021	France	Arnaud Démare	Groupama–FDJ
2022	France	Benjamin Thomas	Cofidis
2023	Spain	Oier Lazkano	Movistar Team
2024	Italy	Alberto Bettiol	EF Education–EasyPost

=== Wins per country ===
Wins	Country
40	France
2	Netherlands
1	Belarus; Canada; Estonia; Italy; Japan; Spain; Switzerland
