= 2016 French Road Cycling Cup =

Bicycle competition

The 2016 French Road Cycling Cup was the 25th edition of the French Road Cycling Cup. It was the first edition in which all riders are eligible to score points, whereas in previous seasons only French riders or riders part of French teams were eligible. The team classification however remained a contest between the French teams only. Compared to the previous season, the same 16 events were part of the cup. The defending champion from the last season was Nacer Bouhanni.

The series turned out to be a close fight between two times winner Samuel Dumoulin and Belgian sprinter Baptiste Planckaert, with both riders separated by just one point before the final race. Dumoulin finished ahead of Planckaert in the final race, taking his third overall win.

== Events ==
Date	Event	Winner	Team	Series leader	Leading Team
31 January	Grand Prix d'Ouverture La Marseillaise	Dries Devenyns (BEL)	IAM Cycling	Dries Devenyns (BEL)	FDJ
19 March	Classic Loire Atlantique	Anthony Turgis (FRA)	Cofidis	Anthony Turgis (FRA)	Cofidis
20 March	Cholet-Pays de Loire	Rudy Barbier (FRA)	Roubaix–Métropole Européenne de Lille	Baptiste Planckaert (BEL)	Armée de Terre
1 April	Route Adélie	Bryan Coquard (FRA)	Direct Énergie	Baptiste Planckaert (BEL)	Armée de Terre
3 April	Paris–Camembert	Cyril Gautier (FRA)	AG2R La Mondiale	Baptiste Planckaert (BEL)	Armée de Terre
14 April	Grand Prix de Denain	Daniel McLay (GBR)	Fortuneo–Vital Concept	Baptiste Planckaert (BEL)	Armée de Terre
16 April	Tour du Finistère	Baptiste Planckaert (BEL)	Wallonie-Bruxelles–Group Protect	Baptiste Planckaert (BEL)	Cofidis
17 April	Tro-Bro Léon	Martin Mortensen (DEN)	ONE Pro Cycling	Baptiste Planckaert (BEL)	FDJ
24 April	La Roue Tourangelle	Samuel Dumoulin (FRA)	AG2R La Mondiale	Baptiste Planckaert (BEL)	Cofidis
28 May	Grand Prix de Plumelec-Morbihan	Samuel Dumoulin (FRA)	AG2R La Mondiale	Baptiste Planckaert (BEL)	Cofidis
29 May	Boucles de l'Aulne	Samuel Dumoulin (FRA)	AG2R La Mondiale	Samuel Dumoulin (FRA)	Cofidis
31 July	Polynormande	Baptiste Planckaert (BEL)	Wallonie-Bruxelles–Group Protect	Samuel Dumoulin (FRA)	Cofidis
4 September	Grand Prix de Fourmies	Marcel Kittel (GER)	Etixx–Quick-Step	Samuel Dumoulin (FRA)	Cofidis
11 September	Tour du Doubs	Samuel Dumoulin (FRA)	AG2R La Mondiale	Samuel Dumoulin (FRA)	Armée de Terre
18 September	Grand Prix d'Isbergues	Kristoffer Halvorsen (NOR)	Team Joker Byggtorget	Samuel Dumoulin (FRA)	Armée de Terre
2 October	Tour de Vendée	Nacer Bouhanni (FRA)	Cofidis	Samuel Dumoulin (FRA)	HP BTP–Auber93

== Race results ==
Race 1: Grand Prix d'Ouverture La Marseillaise
Rank	Rider	Team	Time
1	Dries Devenyns (BEL)	IAM Cycling	3h 31' 43"
2	Thibaut Pinot (FRA)	FDJ	s.t.
3	Baptiste Planckaert (BEL)	Wallonie-Bruxelles–Group Protect	+ 42"
4	Dimitri Claeys (BEL)	Wanty–Groupe Gobert	+ 42"
5	Ryan Anderson (CAN)	Direct Énergie	+ 42"
6	Carlos Barbero (ESP)	Caja Rural–Seguros RGA	+ 42"
7	Arthur Vichot (FRA)	FDJ	+ 42"
8	Tony Gallopin (FRA)	Lotto–Soudal	+ 42"
9	Gaëtan Bille (BEL)	Wanty–Groupe Gobert	+ 42"
10	Jérôme Baugnies (BEL)	Wanty–Groupe Gobert	+ 42"
11	Jimmy Turgis (FRA)	Roubaix–Métropole Européenne de Lille	+ 42"
12	Delio Fernández (ESP)	Delko–Marseille Provence KTM	+ 42"
13	Hugo Houle (CAN)	AG2R La Mondiale	+ 42"
14	Sylvain Chavanel (FRA)	Direct Énergie	+ 42"
15	Thomas Sprengers (BEL)	Topsport Vlaanderen–Baloise	+ 42"

Race 2: Classic Loire Atlantique
Rank	Rider	Team	Time
1	Anthony Turgis (FRA)	Cofidis	4h 22' 37"
2	Loïc Chetout (FRA)	Cofidis	+ 1' 02"
3	Kévin Ledanois (FRA)	Fortuneo–Vital Concept	+ 1' 07"
4	Kenneth Vanbilsen (BEL)	Cofidis	+ 1' 17"
5	Florian Sénéchal (FRA)	Cofidis	+ 1' 18"
6	Pieter Vanspeybrouck (BEL)	Topsport Vlaanderen–Baloise	+ 1' 18"
7	Yoann Offredo (FRA)	FDJ	+ 1' 18"
8	Pierrick Fédrigo (FRA)	Fortuneo–Vital Concept	+ 2' 31"
9	Hugo Hofstetter (FRA)	Cofidis	+ 2' 31"
10	Grégory Habeaux (BEL)	Wallonie-Bruxelles–Group Protect	+ 2' 31"
11	Damien Gaudin (FRA)	AG2R La Mondiale	+ 2' 34"
12	Dimitri Claeys (BEL)	Wanty–Groupe Gobert	+ 7' 05"
13	Romain Combaud (FRA)	Delko–Marseille Provence KTM	+ 7' 07"
14	Nico Denz (GER)	AG2R La Mondiale	+ 8' 12"
15	Sylvain Chavanel (FRA)	Direct Énergie	+ 8' 12"

Race 3: Cholet-Pays de Loire
Rank	Rider	Team	Time
1	Rudy Barbier (FRA)	Roubaix–Métropole Européenne de Lille	5h 11' 43"
2	Baptiste Planckaert (BEL)	Wallonie-Bruxelles–Group Protect	s.t.
3	Yannis Yssaad (FRA)	Armée de Terre	s.t.
4	Nico Denz (GER)	AG2R La Mondiale	s.t.
5	Marc Sarreau (FRA)	FDJ	s.t.
6	David Menut (FRA)	HP BTP–Auber93	s.t.
7	Pieter Vanspeybrouck (BEL)	Topsport Vlaanderen–Baloise	s.t.
8	Laurent Evrard (BEL)	Team3M	s.t.
9	Armindo Fonseca (FRA)	Fortuneo–Vital Concept	s.t.
10	Jimmy Turgis (FRA)	Roubaix–Métropole Européenne de Lille	s.t.
11	Antoine Demoitié (BEL)	Wanty–Groupe Gobert	s.t.
12	Julien Duval (FRA)	Armée de Terre	s.t.
13	Damien Gaudien (FRA)	AG2R La Mondiale	s.t.
14	Alo Jakin (EST)	HP BTP–Auber93	s.t.
15	Piotr Havik (NED)	Team3M	s.t.

Race 4: Route Adélie
Rank	Rider	Team	Time
1	Bryan Coquard (FRA)	Direct Énergie	4h 48' 58"
2	Clément Venturini (FRA)	Cofidis	s.t.
3	Samuel Dumoulin (FRA)	AG2R La Mondiale	s.t.
4	Yannis Yssaad (FRA)	Armée de Terre	s.t.
5	Borut Božič (SLO)	Cofidis	s.t.
6	Armindo Fonseca (FRA)	Fortuneo–Vital Concept	s.t.
7	Baptiste Planckaert (BEL)	Wallonie-Bruxelles–Group Protect	s.t.
8	Maxime Daniel (FRA)	AG2R La Mondiale	s.t.
9	Benjamin Giraud (FRA)	Delko–Marseille Provence KTM	s.t.
10	Anthony Maldonado (FRA)	HP BTP–Auber93	s.t.
11	David Menut (FRA)	HP BTP–Auber93	s.t.
12	Romain Feillu (FRA)	HP BTP–Auber93	s.t.
13	Steven Tronet (FRA)	Fortuneo–Vital Concept	s.t.
14	Christophe Laborie (FRA)	Delko–Marseille Provence KTM	s.t.
15	Dylan Page (SUI)	Team Roth	s.t.

Race 5: Paris–Camembert
Rank	Rider	Team	Time
1	Cyril Gautier (FRA)	AG2R La Mondiale	5h 16' 33"
2	Anthony Delaplace (FRA)	Fortuneo–Vital Concept	s.t.
3	Romain Feillu (FRA)	HP BTP–Auber93	s.t.
4	Samuel Dumoulin (FRA)	AG2R La Mondiale	s.t.
5	Baptiste Planckaert (BEL)	Wallonie-Bruxelles–Group Protect	s.t.
6	Daniele Ratto (ITA)	Androni Giocattoli–Sidermec	s.t.
7	Leonardo Duque (COL)	Delko–Marseille Provence KTM	s.t.
8	Loïc Chetout (FRA)	Cofidis	s.t.
9	Quentin Pacher (FRA)	Delko–Marseille Provence KTM	s.t.
10	César Bihel (FRA)	HP BTP–Auber93	s.t.
11	Bryan Coquard (FRA)	Direct Énergie	s.t.
12	Samuel Spokes (AUS)	Drapac Professional Cycling	s.t.
13	Julien El Fares (FRA)	Delko–Marseille Provence KTM	s.t.
14	Thibault Ferasse (FRA)	Armée de Terre	s.t.
15	Julien Bérard (FRA)	AG2R La Mondiale	s.t.

Race 6: Grand Prix de Denain
Rank	Rider	Team	Time
1	Daniel McLay (GBR)	Fortuneo–Vital Concept	4h 29' 23"
2	Thomas Boudat (FRA)	Direct Énergie	s.t.
3	Kenny Dehaes (BEL)	Wanty–Groupe Gobert	s.t.
4	Baptiste Planckaert (BEL)	Wallonie-Bruxelles–Group Protect	s.t.
5	Lorenzo Manzin (FRA)	FDJ	s.t.
6	Clément Venturini (FRA)	Cofidis	s.t.
7	Paweł Franczak (POL)	Verva ActiveJet	s.t.
8	Chris Opie (GBR)	ONE Pro Cycling	s.t.
9	Bryan Alaphilippe (FRA)	Armée de Terre	s.t.
10	Loïc Chetout (FRA)	Cofidis	s.t.
11	Rudy Barbier (FRA)	Roubaix–Métropole Européenne de Lille	s.t.
12	Raymond Kreder (NED)	Roompot–Oranje Peloton	s.t.
13	Dion Smith (NZL)	ONE Pro Cycling	s.t.
14	Evaldas Šiškevičius (LTU)	Delko–Marseille Provence KTM	s.t.
15	Eryk Latoń (POL)	CCC–Sprandi–Polkowice	s.t.

Race 7: Tour du Finistère
Rank	Rider	Team	Time
1	Baptiste Planckaert (BEL)	Wallonie-Bruxelles–Group Protect	4h 34' 55"
2	Samuel Dumoulin (FRA)	AG2R La Mondiale	s.t.
3	Alexandre Geniez (FRA)	FDJ	s.t.
4	Julien Simon (FRA)	Cofidis	s.t.
5	Romain Feillu (FRA)	HP BTP–Auber93	s.t.
6	Olivier Pardini (BEL)	Wallonie-Bruxelles–Group Protect	s.t.
7	Maxime Vantomme (BEL)	Roubaix–Métropole Européenne de Lille	s.t.
8	Lilian Calmejane (FRA)	Direct Énergie	s.t.
9	Maxime Renault (FRA)	HP BTP–Auber93	s.t.
10	Armindo Fonseca (FRA)	Fortuneo–Vital Concept	s.t.
11	Laurent Pichon (FRA)	FDJ	s.t.
12	Frederik Backaert (BEL)	Wanty–Groupe Gobert	s.t.
13	Jérémy Leveau (FRA)	Roubaix–Métropole Européenne de Lille	s.t.
14	Marcel Meisen (GER)	Team Kuota–Lotto	s.t.
15	Aritz Bagües (ESP)	Euskadi Basque Country–Murias	s.t.

Race 8: Tro-Bro Léon
Rank	Rider	Team	Time
1	Martin Mortensen (DEN)	ONE Pro Cycling	4h 50' 36"
2	Peter Williams (GBR)	ONE Pro Cycling	s.t.
3	Florian Vachon (FRA)	Fortuneo–Vital Concept	s.t.
4	Laurent Pichon (FRA)	FDJ	s.t.
5	Johan Le Bon (FRA)	FDJ	s.t.
6	Yohann Gène (FRA)	Direct Énergie	+ 4"
7	Baptiste Planckaert (BEL)	Wallonie-Bruxelles–Group Protect	+ 17"
8	Dimitri Claeys (BEL)	Wanty–Groupe Gobert	+ 17"
9	Mihkel Räim (EST)	Cycling Academy	+ 17"
10	Sébastien Minard (FRA)	AG2R La Mondiale	+ 20"
11	Maxime Renault (FRA)	HP BTP–Auber93	+ 31"
12	Yannis Yssaad (FRA)	Armée de Terre	+ 31"
13	Christophe Laporte (FRA)	Cofidis	+ 31"
14	Jimmy Turgis (FRA)	Roubaix–Métropole Européenne de Lille	+ 31"
15	Samuel Dumoulin (FRA)	AG2R La Mondiale	+ 31"

Race 9: La Roue Tourangelle
Rank	Rider	Team	Time
1	Samuel Dumoulin (FRA)	AG2R La Mondiale	4h 29' 32"
2	Olivier Pardini (BEL)	Wallonie-Bruxelles–Group Protect	s.t.
3	Julien Duval (FRA)	Armée de Terre	s.t.
4	Mickaël Delage (FRA)	FDJ	s.t.
5	Baptiste Planckaert (BEL)	Wallonie-Bruxelles–Group Protect	s.t.
6	Clément Venturini (FRA)	Cofidis	s.t.
7	Hugo Hofstetter (FRA)	Cofidis	s.t.
8	Thomas Boudat (FRA)	Direct Énergie	s.t.
9	Rudy Barbier (FRA)	Roubaix–Métropole Européenne de Lille	s.t.
10	David Menut (FRA)	HP BTP–Auber93	s.t.
11	Eduard Prades (ESP)	Caja Rural–Seguros RGA	s.t.
12	Kenny Dehaes (BEL)	Wanty–Groupe Gobert	s.t.
13	Gerry Druyts (BEL)	Crelan–Vastgoedservice	s.t.
14	Francesc Zurita (ESP)	Team Vorarlberg	s.t.
15	Anthony Maldonado (FRA)	HP BTP–Auber93	s.t.

Race 10: Grand Prix de Plumelec-Morbihan
Rank	Rider	Team	Time
1	Samuel Dumoulin (FRA)	AG2R La Mondiale	4h 25' 08"
2	Alexis Vuillermoz (FRA)	AG2R La Mondiale	s.t.
3	Arthur Vichot (FRA)	FDJ	s.t.
4	Matthieu Ladagnous (FRA)	FDJ	s.t.
5	Anthony Turgis (FRA)	Cofidis	s.t.
6	Julien Antomarchi (FRA)	Roubaix–Métropole Européenne de Lille	s.t.
7	Marco Tizza (ITA)	D'Amico–Bottecchia	s.t.
8	Quentin Pacher (FRA)	Delko–Marseille Provence KTM	s.t.
9	David Gaudu (FRA)	France	s.t.
10	Maxime Vantomme (BEL)	Roubaix–Métropole Européenne de Lille	s.t.
11	Nicolas Edet (FRA)	Cofidis	s.t.
12	Yann Guyot (FRA)	Armée de Terre	s.t.
13	José Gonçalves (POR)	Caja Rural–Seguros RGA	s.t.
14	Ángel Madrazo (ESP)	Caja Rural–Seguros RGA	s.t.
15	Julien Guay (FRA)	HP BTP–Auber93	s.t.

Race 11: Boucles de l'Aulne
Rank	Rider	Team	Time
1	Samuel Dumoulin (FRA)	AG2R La Mondiale	3h 56' 28"
2	Arthur Vichot (FRA)	FDJ	s.t.
3	Clément Venturini (FRA)	Cofidis	s.t.
4	Maxime Vantomme (BEL)	Roubaix–Métropole Européenne de Lille	s.t.
5	Julien Duval (FRA)	Armée de Terre	s.t.
6	Marco Tizza (ITA)	D'Amico–Bottecchia	s.t.
7	José Gonçalves (POR)	Caja Rural–Seguros RGA	s.t.
8	David Menut (FRA)	HP BTP–Auber93	s.t.
9	Romain Hardy (FRA)	Cofidis	s.t.
10	Adrián González (ESP)	Euskadi Basque Country–Murias	s.t.
11	Luis Ángel Maté (ESP)	Cofidis	s.t.
12	Jonathan Lastra (ESP)	Caja Rural–Seguros RGA	s.t.
13	Nans Peters (FRA)	France	s.t.
14	Lilian Calmejane (FRA)	Direct Énergie	s.t.
15	Rudy Molard (FRA)	Delko–Marseille Provence KTM	s.t.

Race 12: Polynormande
Rank	Rider	Team	Time
1	Baptiste Planckaert (BEL)	Wallonie-Bruxelles–Group Protect	4h 08' 41"
2	Ryan Anderson (CAN)	Direct Énergie	s.t.
3	Julien Duval (FRA)	Armée de Terre	s.t.
4	Samuel Dumoulin (FRA)	AG2R La Mondiale	s.t.
5	Kevyn Ista (BEL)	Wallonie-Bruxelles–Group Protect	s.t.
6	Tony Hurel (FRA)	Direct Énergie	s.t.
7	Rudy Barbier (FRA)	Roubaix–Métropole Européenne de Lille	s.t.
8	Maxime Vantomme (BEL)	Roubaix–Métropole Européenne de Lille	s.t.
9	Dimitri Claeys (BEL)	Wanty–Groupe Gobert	s.t.
10	Anthony Maldonado (FRA)	HP BTP–Auber93	s.t.
11	Lorenzo Manzin (FRA)	FDJ	s.t.
12	Benoît Jarrier (FRA)	Fortuneo–Vital Concept	s.t.
13	Antonino Parrinello (ITA)	D'Amico–Bottecchia	s.t.
14	Romain Cardis (FRA)	Direct Énergie	s.t.
15	Dieter Bouvry (BEL)	Roubaix–Métropole Européenne de Lille	s.t.

Race 13: Grand Prix de Fourmies
Rank	Rider	Team	Time
1	Marcel Kittel (GER)	Etixx–Quick-Step	4h 48' 32"
2	Nacer Bouhanni (FRA)	Cofidis	s.t.
3	Bryan Coquard (FRA)	Direct Énergie	s.t.
4	Romain Feillu (FRA)	HP BTP–Auber93	s.t.
5	Manuel Belletti (ITA)	Wilier Triestina–Southeast	s.t.
6	Arnaud Démare (FRA)	FDJ	s.t.
7	Amaury Capiot (BEL)	Topsport Vlaanderen–Baloise	s.t.
8	Sam Bennett (IRL)	Bora–Argon 18	s.t.
9	Samuel Dumoulin (FRA)	AG2R La Mondiale	s.t.
10	Baptiste Planckaert (BEL)	Wallonie-Bruxelles–Group Protect	s.t.
11	Raymond Kreder (NED)	Roompot–Oranje Peloton	s.t.
12	Alo Jakin (EST)	HP BTP–Auber93	s.t.
13	Julien Duval (FRA)	Armée de Terre	s.t.
14	Ruslan Tleubayev (KAZ)	Astana	s.t.
15	Evaldas Šiškevičius (LTU)	Delko–Marseille Provence KTM	s.t.

Race 14: Tour du Doubs
Rank	Rider	Team	Time
1	Samuel Dumoulin (FRA)	AG2R La Mondiale	4h 02' 12"
2	Baptiste Planckaert (BEL)	Wallonie-Bruxelles–Group Protect	s.t.
3	Thibault Ferasse (FRA)	Armée de Terre	s.t.
4	Eduardo Sepúlveda (ARG)	Fortuneo–Vital Concept	s.t.
5	Nicolas Edet (FRA)	Cofidis	s.t.
6	Sebastien Reichenbach (SUI)	FDJ	+ 3"
7	Domenico Pozzovivo (ITA)	AG2R La Mondiale	+ 5"
8	Roland Thalmann (SUI)	Team Roth	+ 29"
9	Quentin Pacher (FRA)	Delko–Marseille Provence KTM	+ 29"
10	Anthony Delaplace (FRA)	Fortuneo–Vital Concept	+ 29"
11	Valentin Madouas (FRA)	France	+ 29"
12	Guillaume Levarlet (FRA)	HP BTP–Auber93	+ 29"
13	Théo Vimpère (FRA)	HP BTP–Auber93	+ 29"
14	Benjamin Thomas (FRA)	Armée de Terre	+ 29"
15	Julien El Fares (FRA)	Delko–Marseille Provence KTM	+ 40"

Race 15: Grand Prix d'Isbergues
Rank	Rider	Team	Time
1	Kristoffer Halvorsen (NOR)	Team Joker Byggtorget	4h 52' 15"
2	Romain Feillu (FRA)	HP BTP–Auber93	s.t.
3	Baptiste Planckaert (BEL)	Wallonie-Bruxelles–Group Protect	s.t.
4	Daniel McLay (GBR)	Fortuneo–Vital Concept	s.t.
5	Rudy Barbier (FRA)	Roubaix–Métropole Européenne de Lille	s.t.
6	Bryan Coquard (FRA)	Direct Énergie	s.t.
7	Amund Grøndahl Jansen (NOR)	Team Joker Byggtorget	s.t.
8	Clément Venturini (FRA)	Cofidis	s.t.
9	Julien Duval (FRA)	Armée de Terre	s.t.
10	Jakub Mareczko (ITA)	Wilier Triestina–Southeast	s.t.
11	Steele Von Hoff (AUS)	ONE Pro Cycling	s.t.
12	Danilo Napolitano (ITA)	Wanty–Groupe Gobert	s.t.
13	Julien Duval (FRA)	Armée de Terre	s.t.
14	Fabian Wegmann (GER)	Stölting Service Group	s.t.
15	Garikoitz Bravo (ESP)	Euskadi Basque Country–Murias	s.t.

Race 16: Tour de Vendée
Rank	Rider	Team	Time
1	Nacer Bouhanni (FRA)	Cofidis	4h 57' 26"
2	Samuel Dumoulin (FRA)	AG2R La Mondiale	s.t.
3	Bryan Coquard (FRA)	Direct Énergie	s.t.
4	Romain Feillu (FRA)	HP BTP–Auber93	s.t.
5	Baptiste Planckaert (BEL)	Wallonie-Bruxelles–Group Protect	s.t.
6	Julien Duval (FRA)	Armée de Terre	s.t.
7	Rudy Barbier (FRA)	Roubaix–Métropole Européenne de Lille	s.t.
8	Carlos Barbero (ESP)	Caja Rural–Seguros RGA	s.t.
9	Jonathan Hivert (FRA)	Fortuneo–Vital Concept	s.t.
10	Jimmy Raibaud (FRA)	Armée de Terre	s.t.
11	Lorenzo Manzin (FRA)	FDJ	s.t.
12	Francesc Zurita (ESP)	Team Vorarlberg	s.t.
13	Diego Rubio (ESP)	Caja Rural–Seguros RGA	s.t.
14	Alo Jakin (EST)	HP BTP–Auber93	s.t.
15	Christophe Laporte (FRA)	Cofidis	s.t.

== Final standings ==
=== Individual ===
As a change compared to previous editions, all riders are eligible for this classification, not only those that are French or compete for a French-licensed team as was the case until 2015.

Pos.	Rider	Team	Points
1	Samuel Dumoulin (FRA)	AG2R La Mondiale	348
2	Baptiste Planckaert (BEL)	Wallonie-Bruxelles–Group Protect	330
3	Romain Feillu (FRA)	HP BTP–Auber93	123
4	Bryan Coquard (FRA)	Direct Énergie	122
5	Rudy Barbier (FRA)	Roubaix–Métropole Européenne de Lille	112
6	Clément Venturini (FRA)	Cofidis	104
7	Julien Duval (FRA)	Armée de Terre	102
8	Nacer Bouhanni (FRA)	Cofidis	85
9	Arthur Vichot (FRA)	FDJ	74
10	Daniel McLay (GBR)	Fortuneo–Vital Concept	70

=== Young rider classification ===
As a change compared to previous editions, all riders younger than 25 are eligible for this classification, not only those that are French or compete for a French-licensed team as was the case until 2015.

Pos.	Rider	Team	Points
1	Bryan Coquard (FRA)	Direct Énergie	122
2	Rudy Barbier (FRA)	Roubaix–Métropole Européenne de Lille	112
3	Clément Venturini (FRA)	Cofidis	104
4	Daniel McLay (GBR)	Fortuneo–Vital Concept	50
5	Anthony Turgis (FRA)	Cofidis	68
6	Loïc Chetout (FRA)	Cofidis	55
7	Kristoffer Halvorsen (NOR)	Team Joker Byggtorget	50
8	Yannis Yssaad (FRA)	Armée de Terre	50
9	Thomas Boudat (FRA)	Direct Énergie	47
10	David Menut (FRA)	HP BTP–Auber93	45

=== Teams ===
Only French teams are eligible to be classified in the teams classification.

Pos.	Team	Points
1	HP BTP–Auber93	108
2	Armée de Terre	106
3	Cofidis	103
4	FDJ	83
5	Fortuneo–Vital Concept	82
6	AG2R La Mondiale	80
7	Direct Énergie	76
8	Roubaix–Métropole Européenne de Lille	76
9	Delko–Marseille Provence KTM	60
