= 2017 French Road Cycling Cup =

Bicycle competition

The 2017 French Road Cycling Cup was the 26th edition of the French Road Cycling Cup. Compared to the previous season, the same 16 events were part of the cup with the exception of Cholet-Pays de Loire, which was not held due to a dispute between the race organiser and the mayor of Cholet. The defending champion from the previous season was Samuel Dumoulin.

The 2017 edition was won by Laurent Pichon, who took the lead already after the second event and kept it until the end.

== Events ==
Date	Event	Winner	Team	Series leader	Leading Team
29 January	Grand Prix d'Ouverture La Marseillaise	Arthur Vichot (FRA)	FDJ	Arthur Vichot (FRA)	AG2R La Mondiale
18 March	Classic Loire Atlantique	Laurent Pichon (FRA)	Fortuneo–Vital Concept	Laurent Pichon (FRA)	Fortuneo–Vital Concept
31 March	Route Adélie	Laurent Pichon (FRA)	Fortuneo–Vital Concept	Laurent Pichon (FRA)	Fortuneo–Vital Concept
2 April	La Roue Tourangelle	Flavien Dassonville (FRA)	HP BTP–Auber93	Laurent Pichon (FRA)	Fortuneo–Vital Concept
11 April	Paris–Camembert	Nacer Bouhanni (FRA)	Cofidis	Laurent Pichon (FRA)	HP BTP–Auber93
13 April	Grand Prix de Denain	Arnaud Démare (FRA)	FDJ	Laurent Pichon (FRA)	Fortuneo–Vital Concept (Note: Team known as Fortuneo–Vital Concept until 30 June, when they became Fortuneo–Oscaro.)
15 April	Tour du Finistère	Julien Loubet (FRA)	Armée de Terre	Laurent Pichon (FRA)	Fortuneo–Vital Concept
17 April	Tro-Bro Léon	Damien Gaudin (FRA)	Armée de Terre	Laurent Pichon (FRA)	Fortuneo–Vital Concept
27 May	Grand Prix de Plumelec-Morbihan	Alexis Vuillermoz (FRA)	AG2R La Mondiale	Laurent Pichon (FRA)	Fortuneo–Vital Concept
28 May	Boucles de l'Aulne	Odd Christian Eiking (NOR)	FDJ	Laurent Pichon (FRA)	Fortuneo–Vital Concept
30 July	Polynormande	Alexis Gougeard (FRA)	AG2R La Mondiale	Laurent Pichon (FRA)	Fortuneo–Oscaro
3 September	Grand Prix de Fourmies	Nacer Bouhanni (FRA)	Cofidis	Laurent Pichon (FRA)	Fortuneo–Oscaro
10 September	Tour du Doubs	Romain Hardy (FRA)	Fortuneo–Oscaro	Laurent Pichon (FRA)	Fortuneo–Oscaro
17 September	Grand Prix d'Isbergues	Benoît Cosnefroy (FRA)	FDJ	Laurent Pichon (FRA)	Fortuneo–Oscaro
1 October	Tour de Vendée	Christophe Laporte (FRA)	Cofidis	Laurent Pichon (FRA)	Fortuneo–Oscaro

== Race results ==
=== Grand Prix d'Ouverture La Marseillaise ===
Result
Rank	Rider	Team	Time
1	Arthur Vichot (FRA)	FDJ	3h 45' 43"
2	Maxime Bouet (FRA)	Fortuneo–Vital Concept	+ 0"
3	Lilian Calmejane (FRA)	Direct Énergie	+ 0"
4	Julien El Fares (FRA)	Delko–Marseille Provence KTM	+ 0"
5	Tony Gallopin (FRA)	Lotto–Soudal	+ 0"
6	Mikaël Cherel (FRA)	AG2R La Mondiale	+ 0"
7	Mauro Finetto (ITA)	Delko–Marseille Provence KTM	+ 0"
8	Hubert Dupont (FRA)	AG2R La Mondiale	+ 0"
9	Thibaut Pinot (FRA)	FDJ	+ 6"
10	Samuel Dumoulin (FRA)	AG2R La Mondiale	+ 34"
11	Jasper De Buyst (BEL)	Lotto–Soudal	+ 34"
12	Julien Simon (FRA)	Cofidis	+ 34"
13	Ryan Anderson (CAN)	Direct Énergie	+ 34"
14	Thibault Ferasse (FRA)	Armée de Terre	+ 34"
15	Romain Hardy (FRA)	Fortuneo–Vital Concept	+ 34"

=== Classic Loire Atlantique ===
Result
Rank	Rider	Team	Time
1	Laurent Pichon (FRA)	Fortuneo–Vital Concept	4h 26' 19"
2	Thomas Boudat (FRA)	Direct Énergie	+ 0"
3	Hugo Hofstetter (FRA)	Cofidis	+ 0"
4	Edward Planckaert (BEL)	Sport Vlaanderen–Baloise	+ 0"
5	Samuel Dumoulin (FRA)	AG2R La Mondiale	+ 0"
6	Jérémy Leveau (FRA)	Roubaix–Lille Métropole	+ 0"
7	Andrea Vendrame (ITA)	Androni–Sidermec–Bottecchia	+ 0"
8	Olivier Le Gac (FRA)	FDJ	+ 0"
9	Flavien Dassonville (FRA)	HP BTP–Auber93	+ 0"
10	Odd Christian Eiking (NOR)	FDJ	+ 0"
11	Pieter Vanspeybrouck (BEL)	Wanty–Groupe Gobert	+ 0"
12	Justin Oien (USA)	Caja Rural–Seguros RGA	+ 0"
13	Florian Vachon (FRA)	Fortuneo–Vital Concept	+ 0"
14	Damien Touzé (FRA)	HP BTP–Auber93	+ 0"
15	Pierre-Luc Périchon (FRA)	Fortuneo–Vital Concept	+ 0"

=== Route Adélie ===
Result
Rank	Rider	Team	Time
1	Laurent Pichon (FRA)	Fortuneo–Vital Concept	4h 50' 12"
2	Cyril Gautier (FRA)	AG2R La Mondiale	+ 0"
3	Julien Simon (FRA)	Cofidis	+ 0"
4	David Gaudu (FRA)	FDJ	+ 0"
5	Alo Jakin (EST)	HP BTP–Auber93	+ 2"
6	Jonas van Genechten (BEL)	Cofidis	+ 5"
7	Yannis Yssaad (FRA)	Armée de Terre	+ 5"
8	Thomas Boudat (FRA)	Direct Énergie	+ 5"
9	Armindo Fonseca (FRA)	Fortuneo–Vital Concept	+ 5"
10	Clément Venturini (FRA)	Cofidis	+ 5"
11	Matteo Malucelli (ITA)	Androni–Sidermec–Bottecchia	+ 5"
12	Patrick Jäger (AUT)	Team Vorarlberg	+ 5"
13	Damien Touzé (FRA)	HP BTP–Auber93	+ 5"
14	Fabian Lienhard (SUI)	Team Vorarlberg	+ 5"
15	David Menut (FRA)	HP BTP–Auber93	+ 5"

=== La Roue Tourangelle ===
Result
Rank	Rider	Team	Time
1	Flavien Dassonville (FRA)	HP BTP–Auber93	4h 47' 15"
2	Fabien Grellier (FRA)	Direct Énergie	+ 0"
3	Anthony Delaplace (FRA)	Fortuneo–Vital Concept	+ 0"
4	Nacer Bouhanni (FRA)	Cofidis	+ 25"
5	Davide Cimolai (ITA)	FDJ	+ 25"
6	Geoffrey Soupe (FRA)	Cofidis	+ 25"
7	Yannick Martinez (FRA)	Delko–Marseille Provence KTM	+ 25"
8	Damien Touzé (FRA)	HP BTP–Auber93	+ 25"
9	Marco Benfatto (ITA)	Androni–Sidermec–Bottecchia	+ 25"
10	Romain Feillu (FRA)	HP BTP–Auber93	+ 25"
11	Thomas Boudat (FRA)	Direct Énergie	+ 25"
12	Roman Maikin (RUS)	Gazprom–RusVelo	+ 25"
13	Jonas van Genechten (BEL)	Cofidis	+ 25"
14	Emiel Vermeulen (BEL)	Roubaix–Lille Métropole	+ 25"
15	David Menut (FRA)	HP BTP–Auber93	+ 25"

=== Paris–Camembert ===
Result
Rank	Rider	Team	Time
1	Nacer Bouhanni (FRA)	Cofidis	4h 43' 46"
2	Samuel Dumoulin (FRA)	AG2R La Mondiale	+ 0"
3	Kévin Reza (FRA)	FDJ	+ 0"
4	Armindo Fonseca (FRA)	Fortuneo–Vital Concept	+ 0"
5	Romain Combaud (FRA)	Delko–Marseille Provence KTM	+ 0"
6	Jérémy Leveau (FRA)	Roubaix–Lille Métropole	+ 0"
7	Laurent Pichon (FRA)	Fortuneo–Vital Concept	+ 0"
8	Damien Touzé (FRA)	HP BTP–Auber93	+ 0"
9	Kévin Le Cunff (FRA)	HP BTP–Auber93	+ 0"
10	Luca Pacioni (ITA)	Androni–Sidermec–Bottecchia	+ 0"
11	Kévin Lebreton (FRA)	Armée de Terre	+ 0"
12	Alo Jakin (EST)	HP BTP–Auber93	+ 0"
13	Garikoitz Bravo (ESP)	Euskadi Basque Country–Murias	+ 0"
14	Marco Minnaard (NED)	Wanty–Groupe Gobert	+ 0"
15	Guillaume Martin (FRA)	Wanty–Groupe Gobert	+ 0"

=== Grand Prix de Denain ===
Result
Rank	Rider	Team	Time
1	Arnaud Démare (FRA)	FDJ	4h 30' 01"
2	Nacer Bouhanni (FRA)	Cofidis	+ 0"
3	Juan Sebastián Molano (COL)	Team Manzana Postobón	+ 0"
4	Boris Vallée (BEL)	Fortuneo–Vital Concept	+ 0"
5	Roy Jans (BEL)	WB Veranclassic Aqua Protect	+ 0"
6	Jérémy Lecroq (FRA)	Roubaix–Lille Métropole	+ 0"
7	Coen Vermeltfoort (NED)	Roompot–Nederlandse Loterij	+ 0"
8	Damien Touzé (FRA)	HP BTP–Auber93	+ 0"
9	Bert Van Lerberghe (BEL)	Sport Vlaanderen–Baloise	+ 0"
10	Benjamin Giraud (FRA)	Delko–Marseille Provence KTM	+ 0"
11	Jimmy Raibaud (FRA)	Armée de Terre	+ 0"
12	Raymond Kreder (NED)	Roompot–Nederlandse Loterij	+ 0"
13	Evaldas Šiškevičius (LTU)	Delko–Marseille Provence KTM	+ 0"
14	Lawrence Naesen (BEL)	WB Veranclassic Aqua Protect	+ 0"
15	Rudy Barbier (FRA)	AG2R La Mondiale	+ 0"

=== Tour du Finistère ===
Result
Rank	Rider	Team	Time
1	Julien Loubet (FRA)	Armée de Terre	4h 48' 38"
2	Julien Simon (FRA)	Cofidis	+ 2"
3	Pierre Latour (FRA)	AG2R La Mondiale	+ 2"
4	Julien Antomarchi (FRA)	Roubaix–Lille Métropole	+ 2"
5	Frederik Backaert (BEL)	Wanty–Groupe Gobert	+ 2"
6	Romain Hardy (FRA)	Fortuneo–Vital Concept	+ 2"
7	David Gaudu (FRA)	FDJ	+ 9"
8	Thibault Ferasse (FRA)	Armée de Terre	+ 9"
9	Franck Bonnamour (FRA)	Fortuneo–Vital Concept	+ 12"
10	Jérémy Cornu (FRA)	Direct Énergie	+ 13"
11	Clément Venturini (FRA)	Cofidis	+ 27"
12	Samuel Dumoulin (FRA)	AG2R La Mondiale	+ 27"
13	Laurent Pichon (FRA)	Fortuneo–Vital Concept	+ 27"
14	Kévin Le Cunff (FRA)	HP BTP–Auber93	+ 27"
15	Dorian Godon (FRA)	Cofidis	+ 27"

=== Tro-Bro Léon ===
Result
Rank	Rider	Team	Time
1	Damien Gaudin (FRA)	Armée de Terre	4h 50' 22"
2	Frederik Backaert (BEL)	Wanty–Groupe Gobert	+ 2"
3	Benjamin Giraud (FRA)	Delko–Marseille Provence KTM	+ 7"
4	Laurent Pichon (FRA)	Fortuneo–Vital Concept	+ 7"
5	Kévin Le Cunff (FRA)	HP BTP–Auber93	+ 7"
6	Mathias De Witte (BEL)	Cibel–Cebon	+ 7"
7	Arnaud Démare (FRA)	FDJ	+ 7"
8	Damien Touzé (FRA)	HP BTP–Auber93	+ 7"
9	Sylvain Chavanel (FRA)	Direct Énergie	+ 7"
10	Hugo Hofstetter (FRA)	Cofidis	+ 7"
11	Fabien Canal (FRA)	Armée de Terre	+ 7"
12	Julien Loubet (FRA)	Armée de Terre	+ 7"
13	Evaldas Šiškevičius (LTU)	Delko–Marseille Provence KTM	+ 7"
14	Guillaume Levarlet (FRA)	Wanty–Groupe Gobert	+ 7"
15	Erwann Corbel (FRA)	Fortuneo–Vital Concept	+ 7"

=== Grand Prix de Plumelec-Morbihan ===
Result
Rank	Rider	Team	Time
1	Alexis Vuillermoz (FRA)	AG2R La Mondiale	4h 14' 30"
2	Jonathan Hivert (FRA)	Direct Énergie	+ 8"
3	Samuel Dumoulin (FRA)	AG2R La Mondiale	+ 10"
4	Arthur Vichot (FRA)	FDJ	+ 10"
5	Julien Simon (FRA)	Cofidis	+ 10"
6	Benoît Cosnefroy (FRA)	France (national team)	+ 10"
7	Laurent Pichon (FRA)	Fortuneo–Vital Concept	+ 12"
8	Kévin Reza (FRA)	FDJ	+ 12"
9	Thibault Ferasse (FRA)	Armée de Terre	+ 12"
10	Franck Bonnamour (FRA)	Fortuneo–Vital Concept	+ 12"
11	Kévin Le Cunff (FRA)	HP BTP–Auber93	+ 17"
12	Aitor González (ESP)	Euskadi Basque Country–Murias	+ 21"
13	Julien Loubet (FRA)	Armée de Terre	+ 23"
14	Aurélien Paret-Peintre (FRA)	France (national team)	+ 26"
15	Fabio Tommassini (ITA)	D'Amico Utensilnord	+ 27"

=== Boucles de l'Aulne ===
Result
Rank	Rider	Team	Time
1	Odd Christian Eiking (NOR)	FDJ	4h 10' 24"
2	David Gaudu (FRA)	FDJ	+ 10"
3	Laurent Pichon (FRA)	Fortuneo–Vital Concept	+ 10"
4	Julien Loubet (FRA)	Armée de Terre	+ 10"
5	Kévin Le Cunff (FRA)	HP BTP–Auber93	+ 10"
6	Julien El Fares (FRA)	Delko–Marseille Provence KTM	+ 10"
7	Mathias Frank (SUI)	AG2R La Mondiale	+ 10"
8	Daniel Navarro (ESP)	Cofidis	+ 10"
9	Benjamin Thomas (FRA)	Armée de Terre	+ 10"
10	Mikel Bizkarra (ESP)	Euskadi Basque Country–Murias	+ 10"
11	Beñat Txoperena (ESP)	Euskadi Basque Country–Murias	+ 10"
12	Perrig Quéméneur (FRA)	Direct Énergie	+ 10"
13	Rémy Di Gregorio (FRA)	Delko–Marseille Provence KTM	+ 10"
14	Romain Combaud (FRA)	Delko–Marseille Provence KTM	+ 16"
15	Julien Antomarchi (FRA)	Roubaix–Lille Métropole	+ 16"

=== Polynormande ===
Result
Rank	Rider	Team	Time
1	Alexis Gougeard (FRA)	AG2R La Mondiale	3h 59' 09"
2	Johan Le Bon (FRA)	FDJ	+ 3"
3	Laurent Pichon (FRA)	Fortuneo–Oscaro	+ 3"
4	Jérémy Leveau (FRA)	Roubaix–Lille Métropole	+ 3"
5	Romain Le Roux (FRA)	Armée de Terre	+ 3"
6	Guillaume Martin (FRA)	Wanty–Groupe Gobert	+ 5"
7	Dimitri Claeys (BEL)	Cofidis	+ 5"
8	Kenneth Vanbilsen (BEL)	Cofidis	+ 5"
9	Fabien Grellier (FRA)	Direct Énergie	+ 9"
10	Kévin Ledanois (FRA)	Fortuneo–Oscaro	+ 15"
11	Flavien Dassonville (FRA)	HP BTP–Auber93	+ 19"
12	Julien Antomarchi (FRA)	Roubaix–Lille Métropole	+ 52"
13	Grégory Habeaux (BEL)	WB Veranclassic Aqua Protect	+ 1' 19"
14	Anthony Delaplace (FRA)	Fortuneo–Oscaro	+ 1' 20"
15	Bruno Armirail (FRA)	FDJ	+ 1' 20"

=== Grand Prix de Fourmies ===
Result
Rank	Rider	Team	Time
1	Nacer Bouhanni (FRA)	Cofidis	4h 22' 29"
2	Marc Sarreau (FRA)	FDJ	+ 0"
3	Rüdiger Selig (GER)	Bora–Hansgrohe	+ 0"
4	David Menut (FRA)	HP BTP–Auber93	+ 0"
5	Simone Consonni (ITA)	UAE Team Emirates	+ 0"
6	Justin Jules (FRA)	WB Veranclassic Aqua Protect	+ 0"
7	Jordan Levasseur (FRA)	Armée de Terre	+ 0"
8	Jarl Salomein (BEL)	Sport Vlaanderen–Baloise	+ 0"
9	Laurent Pichon (FRA)	Fortuneo–Oscaro	+ 0"
10	John Degenkolb (GER)	Trek–Segafredo	+ 0"
11	Danilo Napolitano (ITA)	Wanty–Groupe Gobert	+ 0"
12	Gianluca Brambilla (ITA)	Quick-Step Floors	+ 0"
13	Marco Canola (ITA)	Nippo–Vini Fantini	+ 0"
14	Riccardo Minali (ITA)	Astana	+ 0"
15	Kévin Le Cunff (FRA)	HP BTP–Auber93	+ 0"

=== Tour du Doubs ===
Result
Rank	Rider	Team	Time
1	Romain Hardy (FRA)	Fortuneo–Oscaro	4h 07' 00"
2	Flavien Dassonville (FRA)	HP BTP–Auber93	+ 5"
3	Quentin Jaurégui (FRA)	AG2R La Mondiale	+ 8"
4	Nicolas Edet (FRA)	Cofidis	+ 8"
5	Romain Sicard (FRA)	Direct Énergie	+ 8"
6	Thibault Ferasse (FRA)	Armée de Terre	+ 15"
7	Mathias Le Turnier (FRA)	Cofidis	+ 15"
8	Valentin Madouas (FRA)	France (national team)	+ 15"
9	Julien Antomarchi (FRA)	Roubaix–Lille Métropole	+ 15"
10	Guillaume Martin (FRA)	Wanty–Groupe Gobert	+ 15"
11	Jérôme Mainard (FRA)	Armée de Terre	+ 47"
12	David Gaudu (FRA)	FDJ	+ 1' 21"
13	Pierre Idjouadiene (FRA)	France (national team)	+ 2' 20"
14	Mauro Finetto (ITA)	Delko–Marseille Provence KTM	+ 2' 25"
15	Julien Simon (FRA)	Cofidis	+ 2' 27"

=== Grand Prix d'Isbergues ===
Result
Rank	Rider	Team	Time
1	Benoît Cosnefroy (FRA)	AG2R La Mondiale	4h 48' 07"
2	Pierre Gouault (FRA)	HP BTP–Auber93	+ 0"
3	Alan Riou (FRA)	Fortuneo–Oscaro	+ 7"
4	Nicolas Baldo (FRA)	HP BTP–Auber93	+ 7"
5	Rudy Barbier (FRA)	AG2R La Mondiale	+ 7"
6	Mark Cavendish (GBR)	Team Dimension Data	+ 7"
7	Nacer Bouhanni (FRA)	Cofidis	+ 7"
8	Laurent Pichon (FRA)	Fortuneo–Oscaro	+ 7"
9	Marc Sarreau (FRA)	FDJ	+ 7"
10	David Menut (FRA)	HP BTP–Auber93	+ 7"
11	Justin Jules (FRA)	WB Veranclassic Aqua Protect	+ 7"
12	Jordan Levasseur (FRA)	Armée de Terre	+ 7"
13	André Looij (NED)	Roompot–Nederlandse Loterij	+ 7"
14	Damien Touzé (FRA)	HP BTP–Auber93	+ 7"
15	Kévin Le Cunff (FRA)	HP BTP–Auber93	+ 7"

=== Tour de Vendée ===
Result
Rank	Rider	Team	Time
1	Christophe Laporte (FRA)	Cofidis	4h 53' 55"
2	Justin Jules (FRA)	WB Veranclassic Aqua Protect	+ 20"
3	Fabian Lienhard (SUI)	Team Vorarlberg	+ 20"
4	Romain Combaud (FRA)	Delko–Marseille Provence KTM	+ 20"
5	Thomas Boudat (FRA)	Direct Énergie	+ 20"
6	Jérémy Leveau (FRA)	Roubaix–Lille Métropole	+ 20"
7	Daniel Hoelgaard (NOR)	FDJ	+ 20"
8	Kévin Le Cunff (FRA)	HP BTP–Auber93	+ 20"
9	Romain Hardy (FRA)	Fortuneo–Oscaro	+ 20"
10	Jonathan Lastra (ESP)	Caja Rural–Seguros RGA	+ 20"
11	Cyril Gautier (FRA)	AG2R La Mondiale	+ 20"
12	Laurent Pichon (FRA)	Fortuneo–Oscaro	+ 20"
13	Florian Vachon (FRA)	Fortuneo–Oscaro	+ 20"
14	Damien Touzé (FRA)	HP BTP–Auber93	+ 20"
15	Pierre Gouault (FRA)	HP BTP–Auber93	+ 20"

== Final cup standings ==
=== Individual ===
All competing riders are eligible for this classification, not only those that are French or compete for a French-licensed team as was the case until 2015.

Pos.	Rider	Team	Points
1	Laurent Pichon (FRA)	Fortuneo–Oscaro	228
2	Nacer Bouhanni (FRA)	Cofidis	169
3	Flavien Dassonville (FRA)	HP BTP–Auber93	101
4	Samuel Dumoulin (FRA)	AG2R La Mondiale	91
5	Julien Simon (FRA)	Cofidis	86
6	Romain Hardy (FRA)	Fortuneo–Oscaro	79
7	Julien Loubet (FRA)	Armée de Terre	78
8	David Gaudu (FRA)	FDJ	74
9	Kévin Le Cunff (FRA)	HP BTP–Auber93	73
10	Thomas Boudat (FRA)	Direct Énergie	71

=== Young rider classification ===
All riders younger than 25 are eligible for this classification, not only those that are French or compete for a French-licensed team as was the case until 2015.

Pos.	Rider	Team	Points
1	David Gaudu (FRA)	FDJ	74
2	Thomas Boudat (FRA)	Direct Énergie	71
3	Jérémy Leveau (FRA)	Roubaix–Lille Métropole	68
4	Damien Touzé (FRA)	HP BTP–Auber93	60
5	Odd Christian Eiking (NOR)	FDJ	58
6	Christophe Laporte (FRA)	Cofidis	50
7	Benoît Cosnefroy (FRA)	AG2R La Mondiale	50
8	Alexis Gougeard (FRA)	AG2R La Mondiale	50
9	Marc Sarreau (FRA)	FDJ	45
10	Fabien Grellier (FRA)	Direct Énergie	45

=== Teams ===
Only French teams are eligible to be classified in the teams classification.

Pos.	Team	Points
1	Fortuneo–Oscaro	131
2	HP BTP–Auber93	122
3	Cofidis	103
4	FDJ	99
5	AG2R La Mondiale	92
6	Armée de Terre	83
7	Direct Énergie	78
8	Delko–Marseille Provence KTM	69
9	Roubaix–Lille Métropole	52
