= 2017 Classic Loire-Atlantique =

2017 UCI Europe Tour

Race details
- Dates: 18 March 2017
- Stages: 1
- Distance: 182.8 km (113.6 mi)
- Winning time: 4h 26' 19"

Results
	Winner	Laurent Pichon (FRA)
	Second	Thomas Boudat (FRA)
	Third	Hugo Hofstetter (FRA)

The 2017 Classic Loire-Atlantique was the 18th edition of the Classic Loire-Atlantique road cycling one day race. It was held on 18 March 2017 as part of UCI Europe Tour in category 1.1.

== Teams ==
Seventeen teams of up to eight riders started the race:

UCI WorldTeams

- AG2R La Mondiale
- FDJ

UCI Professional Continental teams

- Cofidis
- Direct Énergie
- Sport Vlaanderen–Baloise
- Caja Rural–Seguros RGA
- Delko–Marseille Provence KTM
- Wanty–Groupe Gobert
- Androni Giocattoli–Sidermec
- Fortuneo–Vital Concept

UCI Continental teams

- Armée de Terre
- Team FixIT.no
- Kuwait–Cartucho.es
- Euskadi Basque Country–Murias
- HP BTP–Auber93
- Roubaix–Lille Métropole

National team

- France

== Result ==
Final general classification

Rank	Rider	Team	Time
1	Laurent Pichon (FRA)	Fortuneo–Vital Concept	4h 26' 19"
2	Thomas Boudat (FRA)	Direct Énergie	s.t.
3	Hugo Hofstetter (FRA)	Cofidis	s.t.
4	Edward Planckaert (BEL)	Sport Vlaanderen–Baloise	s.t.
5	Samuel Dumoulin (FRA)	AG2R La Mondiale	s.t.
6	Jérémy Leveau (FRA)	Roubaix–Lille Métropole	s.t.
7	Andrea Vendrame (ITA)	Androni Giocattoli–Sidermec	s.t.
8	Olivier Le Gac (FRA)	FDJ	s.t.
9	Flavien Dassonville (FRA)	HP BTP–Auber93	s.t.
10	Odd Christian Eiking (NOR)	FDJ	s.t.
