= 2022 Milan–San Remo =

Italian one-day cycling race

2022 UCI World Tour, race 6 of 32
- Official event poster

Race details
- Dates: 19 March 2022
- Stages: 1
- Distance: 293 km (182 mi)
- Winning time: 6h 27' 49"

Results
	Winner	Matej Mohorič (SLO)	(Team Bahrain Victorious)
	Second	Anthony Turgis (FRA)	(Team TotalEnergies)
	Third	Mathieu van der Poel (NED)	(Alpecin–Fenix)

The 2022 Milan–San Remo was a road cycling one-day race that took place on 19 March 2022 in northwestern Italy. It was the 113th edition of the Milan–San Remo cycling classic. Originally the eighth event on the 2022 UCI World Tour calendar, it became the sixth event after the cancellation of the Tour Down Under and the Cadel Evans Great Ocean Road Race.

In a similar move to the one that won Jasper Stuyven the previous edition, Matej Mohorič attacked on the descent of the Poggio di San Remo with under 5 kilometres (3.1 mi) to go and soloed to the win. Anthony Turgis, who had attacked in the final kilometre to try to bridge the gap to Mohorič, stayed ahead of the chasing group to finish second, with Mathieu van der Poel winning the sprint for third from the aforementioned group.

== Teams ==
All eighteen UCI WorldTeams and the top two UCI ProTeams from the 2021 season, Alpecin–Fenix and Arkéa–Samsic, were automatically invited. The next best ProTeam from the 2021 season, Team TotalEnergies also received an automatic invitation, while four additional UCI ProTeams received wild card invitations. Among these teams was Gazprom–RusVelo, but on 1 March 2022, the UCI revoked the licences of Russian and Belarusian teams due to the Russian invasion of Ukraine.

Twenty-four teams participated in the race. Of these teams, Bora–Hansgrohe and Lotto–Soudal, with six riders each, were the only teams to not enter a full squad of seven riders. Team BikeExchange–Jayco was reduced to six riders with one non-starter. Of the 165 riders who took part in the race, 159 finished.

UCI WorldTeams

- AG2R Citroën Team
- Astana Qazaqstan Team
- Bora–Hansgrohe
- Cofidis
- EF Education–EasyPost
- Groupama–FDJ
- INEOS Grenadiers
- Intermarché–Wanty–Gobert Matériaux
- Israel–Premier Tech
- Lotto–Soudal
- Movistar Team
- Quick-Step Alpha Vinyl Team
- Team Bahrain Victorious
- Team BikeExchange–Jayco
- Team DSM
- Team Jumbo–Visma
- Trek–Segafredo
- UAE Team Emirates

UCI ProTeams

- Alpecin–Fenix
- Arkéa–Samsic
- Bardiani–CSF–Faizanè
- Drone Hopper–Androni Giocattoli
- Eolo–Kometa
- Team TotalEnergies

== Result ==
Result (1–10)
Rank	Rider	Team	Time
1	Matej Mohorič (SLO)	Team Bahrain Victorious	6h 27' 49"
2	Anthony Turgis (FRA)	Team TotalEnergies	+ 2"
3	Mathieu van der Poel (NED)	Alpecin–Fenix	+ 2"
4	Michael Matthews (AUS)	Team BikeExchange–Jayco	+ 2"
5	Tadej Pogačar (SLO)	UAE Team Emirates	+ 2"
6	Mads Pedersen (DEN)	Trek–Segafredo	+ 2"
7	Søren Kragh Andersen (DEN)	Team DSM	+ 2"
8	Wout van Aert (BEL)	Team Jumbo–Visma	+ 2"
9	Jan Tratnik (SLO)	Team Bahrain Victorious	+ 5"
10	Arnaud Démare (FRA)	Groupama–FDJ	+ 11"
