= 2019 Grand Prix La Marseillaise =

2019 UCI Europe Tour

Race details
- Dates: 3 February 2019
- Stages: 1
- Distance: 139.8 km (86.87 mi)
- Winning time: 3h 39' 47"

Results
| | Winner | Anthony Turgis (FRA) |
| | Second | Romain Combaud (FRA) |
| | Third | Tom Van Asbroeck (BEL) |

The 2019 Grand Prix La Marseillaise was the 40th edition of the Grand Prix La Marseillaise cycle race. It was held on 3 February 2019 as a category 1.1 race on the 2019 UCI Europe Tour. The race started and finished in Marseille. The race was won by Anthony Turgis of Direct Énergie.

== Teams ==
Sixteen teams of up to seven riders started the race:

UCI WorldTeams

- AG2R La Mondiale
- Groupama–FDJ

UCI Professional Continental teams

- Delko–Marseille Provence
- Vital Concept–B&B Hotels
- Sport Vlaanderen–Baloise
- Euskadi–Murias
- Wallonie Bruxelles
- Cofidis
- Arkéa–Samsic
- Gazprom–RusVelo
- Wanty–Gobert
- Israel Cycling Academy
- Direct Énergie

UCI Continental teams

- St. Michel–Auber93
- Sovac Algérie
- Natura4Ever–Roubaix–Lille Métropole

== Result ==
Final general classification
| Rank | Rider | Team | Time |
|---|---|---|---|
| 1 | Anthony Turgis (FRA) | Direct Énergie | 3h 39' 47" |
| 2 | Romain Combaud (FRA) | Delko–Marseille Provence | s.t. |
| 3 | Tom Van Asbroeck (BEL) | Israel Cycling Academy | + 23" |
| 4 | Julien Trarieux (FRA) | Delko–Marseille Provence | s.t. |
| 5 | Zico Waeytens (BEL) | Cofidis | s.t. |
| 6 | Lilian Calmejane (FRA) | Direct Énergie | s.t. |
| 7 | Clément Venturini (FRA) | AG2R La Mondiale | s.t. |
| 8 | Milan Menten (BEL) | Sport Vlaanderen–Baloise | s.t. |
| 9 | Kévin Le Cunff (FRA) | St. Michel–Auber93 | s.t. |
| 10 | Aimé De Gendt (BEL) | Wanty–Gobert | s.t. |
