= Tanguy Turgis =

French cyclist

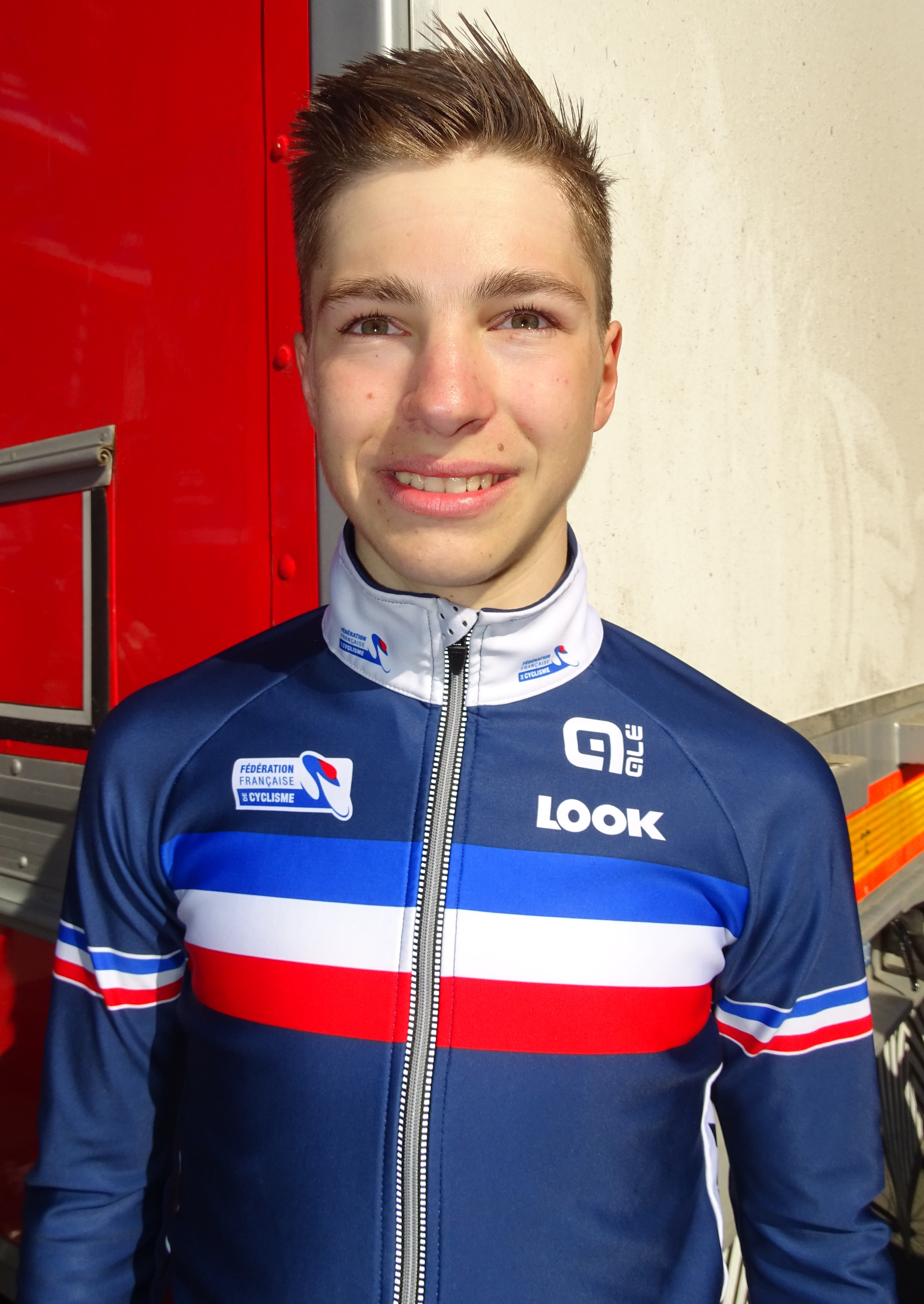
- Turgis at the 2016 Paris–Roubaix Juniors.

Personal information
- Full name: Tanguy Turgis
- Born: 16 May 1998 (age 28) Bourg-la-Reine, France

Cycling career
- Sport: Cycling
- Current team: Retired
- Discipline: Road
- Role: Rider

Amateur teams
- 2013–2016: US Métro Transports
- 2017: BMC Development Team

Professional teams
- 2017: Cofidis (stagiaire)
- 2018: Vital Concept

Tanguy Turgis (born 16 May 1998) is a French former professional cyclist who competed professionally in 2018, retiring the same year due to a health condition. His brothers Jimmy Turgis and Anthony Turgis are also cyclists.

== Career ==
Born in Bourg-la-Reine, Turgis joined BMC Development Team in 2017, the development team of the BMC Racing Team. In August 2017, he rode for UCI Professional Continental team Cofidis as a stagiaire.

Turgis joined UCI Professional Continental team Vital Concept for the 2018 season. He rode in Paris–Roubaix, finishing in 42nd place. This made him the first teenager to finish the race since 1962. He also rode in Gent–Wevelgem and the E3 Harelbeke, all spring classics. He celebrated his first major top-10 finish in a 1.HC rated event, the Handzame Classic.

In late 2018, Turgis was diagnosed with a congenital heart malformation and had to end his bicycle racing career.

== Major results ==
2015
5th Bernaudeau Junior
9th Paris–Roubaix Juniors
2016
1st Bernaudeau Junior
2nd Overall GP Général Patton

1st Stage 2

3rd Paris–Roubaix Juniors
3rd Time trial, National Junior Road Championships
5th Overall Tour du Pays de Vaud

1st Stage 3

2017
1st Omloop Het Nieuwsblad Beloften
9th Dorpenomloop Rucphen
2018
8th Handzame Classic
