= 2018 Grand Prix de Denain =

Race details
- Dates: 18 March 2018
- Stages: 1
- Distance: 197.9 km (123.0 mi)
- Winning time: 4h 33' 37"

Results
	Winner	Kenny Dehaes (BEL)
	Second	Hugo Hofstetter (FRA)
	Third	Julien Duval (FRA)

The 2018 Grand Prix de Denain was the 60th edition of the Grand Prix de Denain cycle race and was held on 18 March 2018. The race started and finished in Denain. The race was won by Kenny Dehaes.

== General classification ==
Final general classification

Rank	Rider	Time
1	Kenny Dehaes (BEL)	4h 33' 37"
2	Hugo Hofstetter (FRA)	+ 2"
3	Julien Duval (FRA)	+ 2"
4	Andrea Pasqualon (ITA)	+ 2"
5	Bram Welten (NED)	+ 2"
6	Coen Vermeltfoort (NED)	+ 2"
7	Shane Archbold (NZL)	+ 2"
8	Marc Sarreau (FRA)	+ 2"
9	Jimmy Turgis (FRA)	+ 2"
10	Adrien Petit (FRA)	+ 2"
