= BMC Development Team =

American cycling team

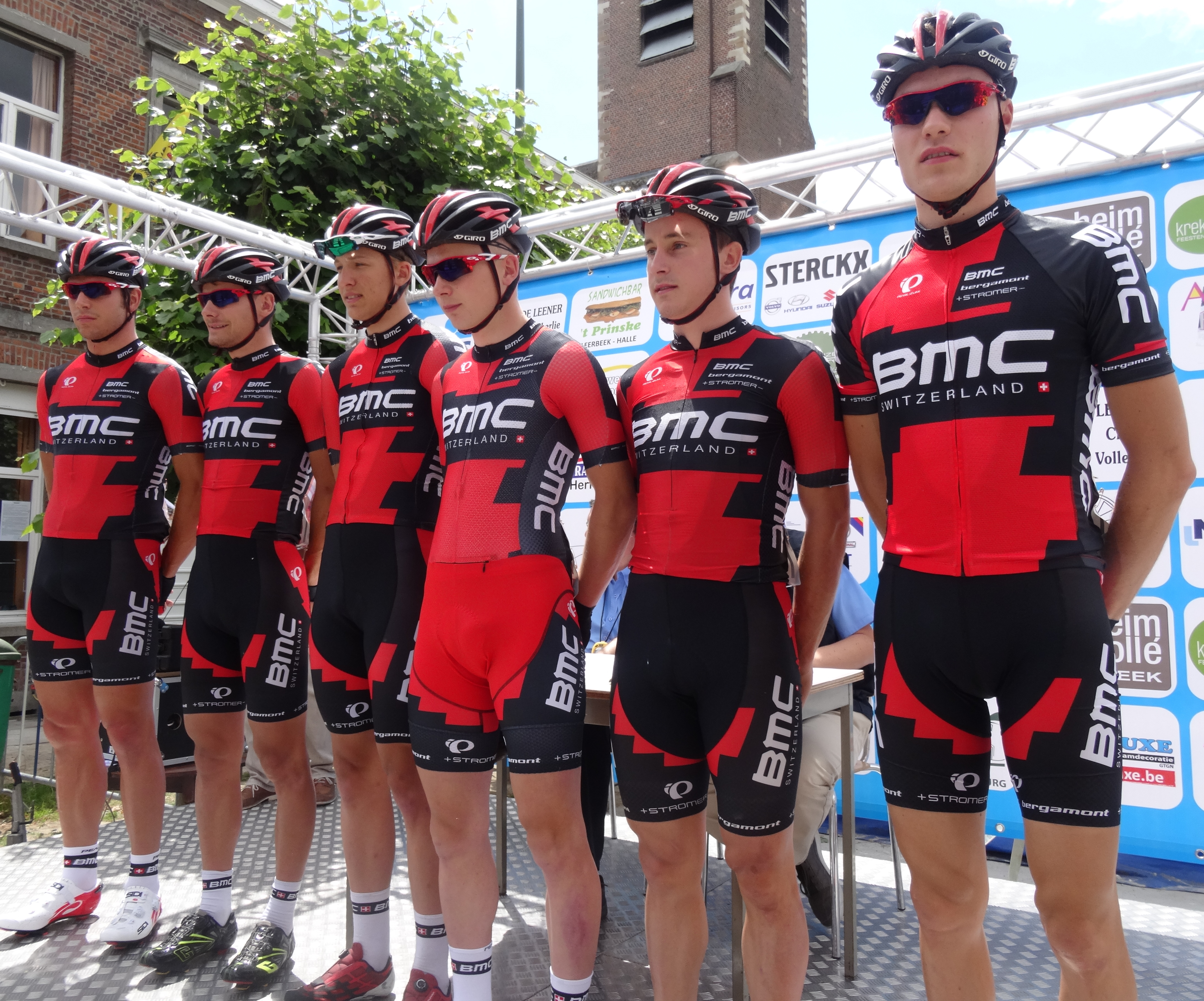
- The team at the 2014 Internationale Wielertrofee Jong Maar Moedig

Team information
- UCI code: BMD
- Registered: United States
- Founded: 2013
- Disbanded: 2017
- Discipline: Road
- Status: Club
- Bicycles: BMC

Key personnel
- General manager: Rik Verbrugghe

Team name history
- 2013–2017: BMC Development Team

BMC Development Team was an American cycling team that acted as a development team for BMC Racing Team. In July 2017 Jim Ochowicz announced that the team would be disbanded at the end of the season.

== Final roster ==
As at 1 January 2017

Rider	Date of birth
Leo Appelt (GER)	May 26, 1997 (aged 19)
Pierre Barbier (FRA)	September 25, 1997 (aged 19)
Steff Cras (BEL)	February 13, 1996 (aged 20)
Sam Dobbs (NZL)	March 14, 1997 (aged 19)
Pascal Eenkhoorn (NED)	February 8, 1997 (aged 19)
Marc Hirschi (SWI)	August 24, 1998 (aged 18)
Patrick Müller (SWI)	April 18, 1996 (aged 20)
Reto Müller (SWI)	February 5, 1998 (aged 18)

Rider	Date of birth
Jasper Philipsen (BEL)	March 2, 1998 (aged 18)
Martin Schäppi (SWI)	December 12, 1996 (aged 20)
Callum Scotson (AUS)	August 10, 1996 (aged 20)
Pavel Sivakov (RUS)	July 17, 1997 (aged 19)
Mario Spengler (SWI)	August 27, 1997 (aged 19)
Tanguy Turgis (FRA)	May 16, 1998 (aged 18)
Bram Welten (NED)	March 29, 1997 (aged 19)

== Major wins ==
2013
Overall Tour de Normandie, Silvan Dillier
2014
Overall Tour de Normandie, Stefan Küng

Prologue, Stefan Küng

Stage 3 Tour de Bretagne, Dylan Teuns
Flèche Ardennaise, Stefan Küng
Stage 3 Giro della Valle d'Aosta, Dylan Teuns
Stage 6 Tour de Guadeloupe, Ignazio Moser
2015
Dorpenomloop Rucphen, Floris Gerts
Prologue Tour de Normandie, Tom Bohli
Stage 6 Tour de Normandie, Floris Gerts
Stage 7 Tour de Bretagne, Loïc Vliegen
Tour de Berne, Tom Bohli
Flèche Ardennaise, Loïc Vliegen
Paris–Roubaix Espoirs, Lukas Spengler
Stage 3 Tour des Pays de Savoie, Loïc Vliegen
Omloop Het Nieuwsblad U23, Floris Gerts
2016
Giro del Belvedere, Patrick Müller
Stage 1 Le Triptyque des Monts et Châteaux, Bram Welten
Prologue Tour de Berlin, Team time trial
Overall Giro Ciclistico della Valle d'Aosta Mont Blanc, Kilian Frankiny

Stage 1, Team time trial
Stage 4, Kilian Frankiny

2017
Overall Ronde de l'Isard, Pavel Sivakov

Stages 2 & 4, Pavel Sivakov

Overall Giro della Valle d'Aosta, Pavel Sivakov

Stage 3, Pavel Sivakov

Overall Girobio, Pavel Sivakov

Young rider classification, Pavel Sivakov

Stage 9 Tour de l'Avenir, Pavel Sivakov
Stage 2 Tour Alsace, Jasper Philipsen
