= Théo Vimpère =

French cyclist

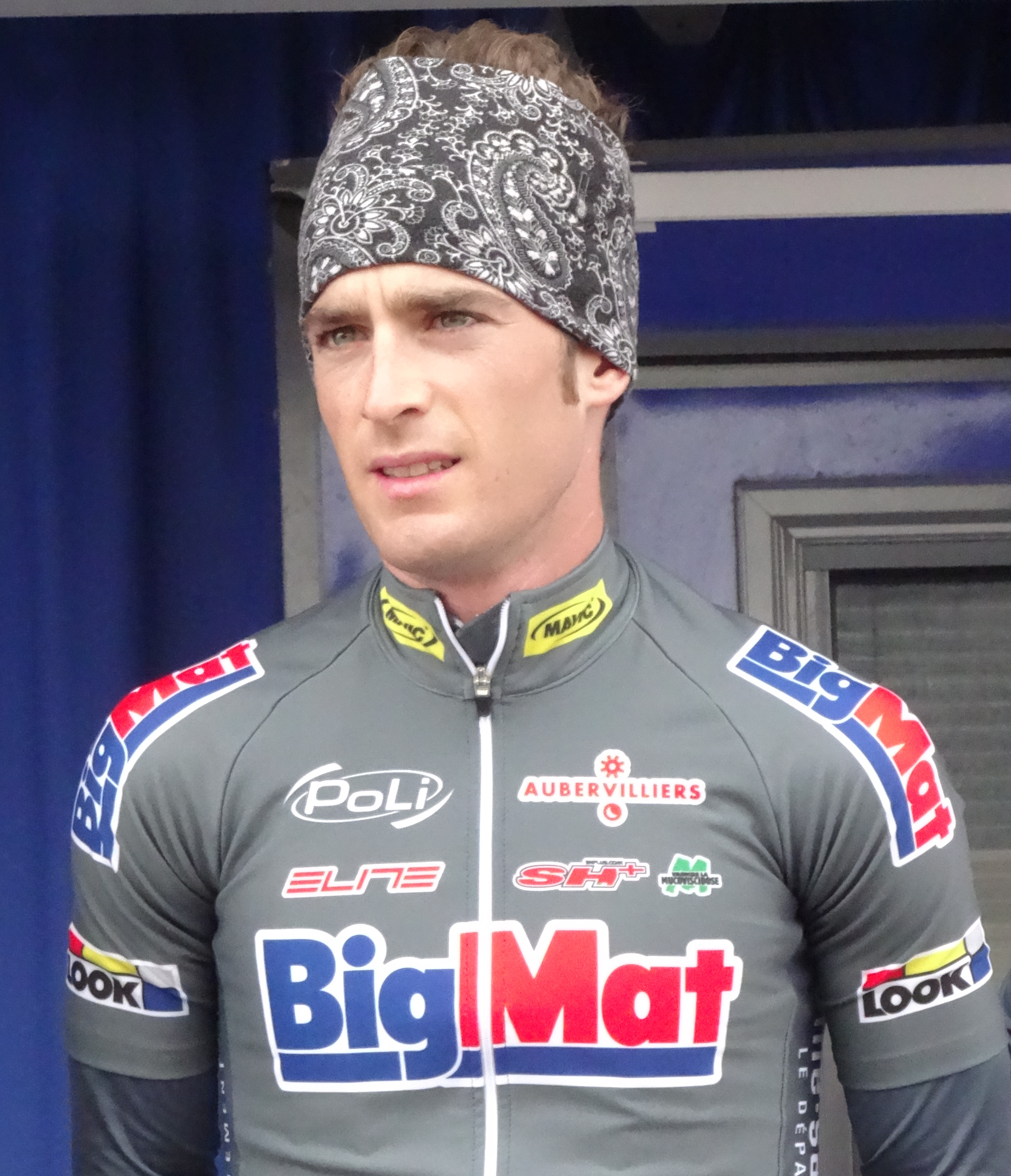
- Vimpère in 2014

Personal information
- Full name: Théo Vimpère
- Born: 3 July 1990 (age 36) Limoges, France

Cycling career
- Sport: Cycling
- Discipline: Road
- Role: Rider

Amateur teams
- 2008: CC Mainsat Evaux Junior
- 2009–2010: CRC Limousin
- 2011–2012: CM Aubervilliers 93
- 2017–2018: Pro Immo Nicolas Roux

Professional teams
- 2011: BigMat–Auber 93 (stagiaire)
- 2013–2016: BigMat–Auber 93

Théo Vimpère (born 3 July 1990 in Limoges) is a French racing cyclist, who last rode for French amateur team Pro Immo Nicolas Roux.

== Major results ==
2011
1st Stage 1 Tour d'Eure-et-Loir
2013
1st Mountains classification Tour Méditerranéen
1st Points classification Tour du Limousin
2014
7th Tour du Doubs
10th Overall Tour du Gévaudan Languedoc-Roussillon
2015
7th Overall Tour de l'Ain
9th Cholet-Pays de Loire
2016
7th Overall Tour du Limousin
2017
1st Stage 2a Tour de Guadeloupe
