= Anthony Turgis =

French cyclist (born 1994)

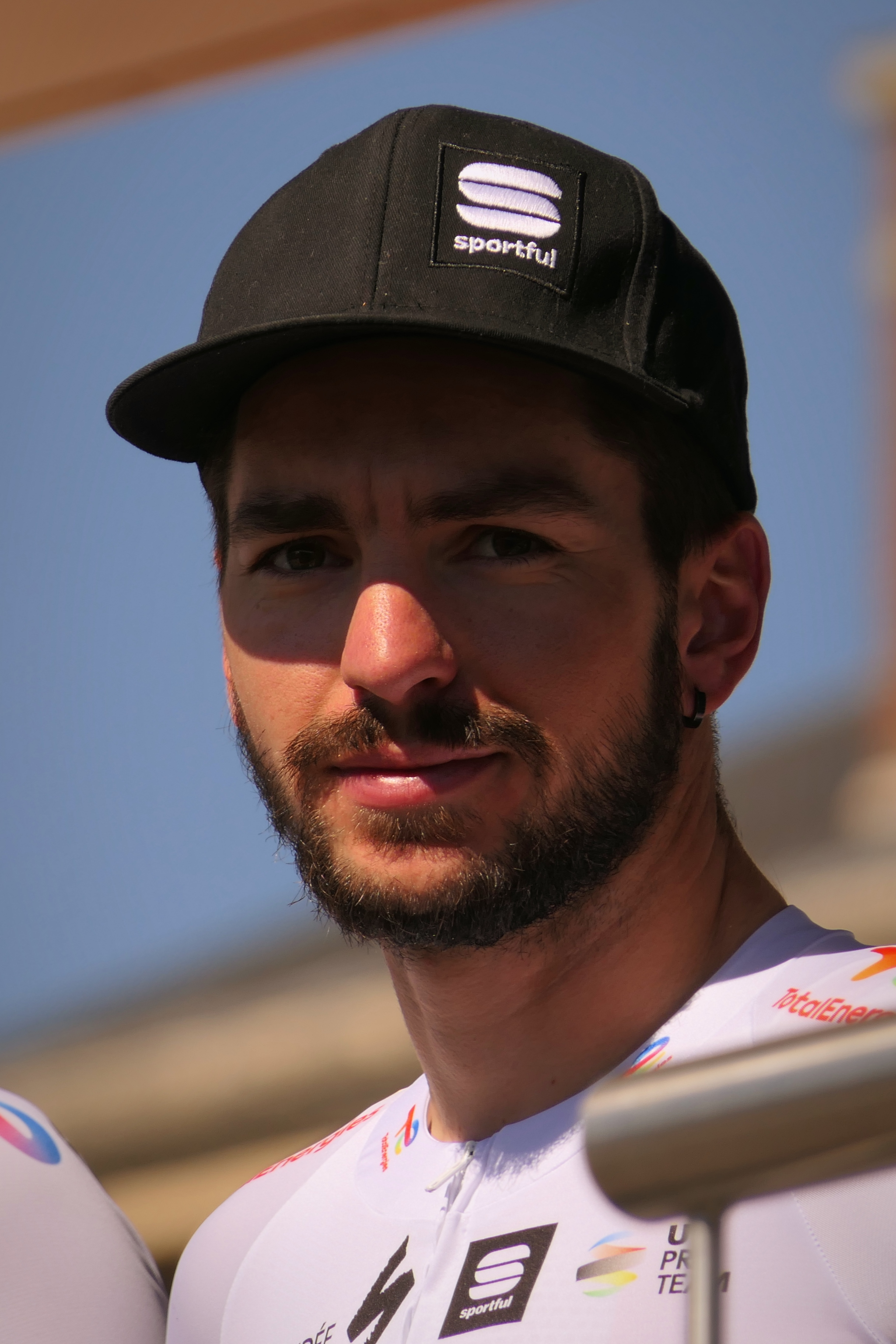
- Turgis, 2022 Paris–Roubaix.

Personal information
- Full name: Anthony Turgis
- Born: 16 May 1994 (age 32) Bourg-la-Reine, France
- Height: 1.79 m (5 ft 10 1/2 in)
- Weight: 69 kg (152 lb; 10 st 12 lb)

Cycling career
- Sport: Cycling
- Current team: Team TotalEnergies
- Discipline: Road
- Role: Rider
- Rider type: Classics specialist

Amateur teams
- 2011–2012: US Metro Transports Junior
- 2013–2014: C.C. Nogent-sur-Oise
- 2014: Cofidis (stagiaire)

Professional teams
- 2015–2018: Cofidis
- 2019–: Direct Énergie

Major wins
- Grand Tours Tour de France 1 individual stage (2024)
Medal record
Representing France
Men's road bicycle racing
European Championships
Silver medal – second place	2012 Goes	Junior road race
Bronze medal – third place	2014 Nyon	Under-23 road race

Anthony Turgis (born 16 May 1994) is a French professional racing cyclist, who currently rides for UCI ProTeam Team TotalEnergies. Professional since 2015, he won the ninth stage of the 2024 Tour de France from a small bunch sprint. Other professional wins of his include the 2019 Grand Prix La Marseillaise, the 2015 Boucles de la Mayenne, the 2016 Classic Loire Atlantique and the 2019 Paris–Chauny. He also finished second in the 2019 Dwars door Vlaanderen and 2022 Milan–San Remo and has competed in eight Grand Tours.

== Personal life ==
His brothers Jimmy and Tanguy also competed professionally in cycling. Both had to retire due to heart conditions.

== Major results ==
=== Road ===
2012
1st Stage 2a (TTT) Liège–La Gleize
UEC European Junior Championships

2nd Road race
10th Time trial

2nd Paris–Roubaix Juniors
7th Bernaudeau Junior
2014
1st Liège–Bastogne–Liège Espoirs
3rd Road race, UEC European Under-23 Championships
3rd Road race, National Amateur Championships
2015 (2 pro wins)
1st Overall Boucles de la Mayenne

1st Young rider classification
1st Stage 2

3rd Road race, UCI World Under-23 Championships
8th Overall Arctic Race of Norway
9th Road race, European Games
2016 (2)
1st Classic Loire Atlantique
3rd Overall Tour de Yorkshire
4th Overall Tour de Luxembourg

1st Stage 3

5th Grand Prix de Plumelec-Morbihan
2017
3rd Paris–Chauny
3rd Tour de l'Eurométropole
2018
2nd Road race, National Championships
5th Dwars door West–Vlaanderen
5th Paris–Chauny
2019 (2)
1st Grand Prix La Marseillaise
1st Paris–Chauny
2nd Dwars door Vlaanderen
4th Overall Four Days of Dunkirk

1st Young rider classification

4th Overall Tour de Luxembourg

1st Young rider classification

4th Duo Normand (with Niki Terpstra)
4th Famenne Ardenne Classic
5th Circuit de Wallonie
6th Paris–Bourges
2020
4th Tour of Flanders
5th Road race, National Championships
8th Grand Prix La Marseillaise
8th Brabantse Pijl
2021
2nd Kuurne–Brussels–Kuurne
5th Overall Tour Poitou-Charentes en Nouvelle-Aquitaine
8th Dwars door Vlaanderen
8th Tour of Flanders
9th Gent–Wevelgem
10th Milan–San Remo
2022
2nd Road race, National Championships
2nd Milan–San Remo
3rd Polynormande
6th Primus Classic
8th Grand Prix of Aargau Canton
10th Overall Boucles de la Mayenne
2023
2nd Super 8 Classic
9th Milan–San Remo
10th Circuit Franco-Belge
Combativity award Stage 8 Tour de France
2024 (1)
1st Stage 9 Tour de France
4th Road race, National Championships
10th Paris–Tours
2025
2nd Trofeo Ses Salines
4th Tro-Bro Léon
6th Münsterland Giro
6th Trofeo Palma
2026
3rd Grand Prix de Denain
4th Münsterland Giro
6th Trofeo Calvià
8th Omloop Het Nieuwsblad
9th Binche–Chimay–Binche
10th Overall ZLM Tour

==== Grand Tour general classification results timeline ====
Grand Tour	2017	2018	2019	2020	2021	2022	2023	2024
Giro d'Italia	Has not contested during his career							
Tour de France	—	116	131	108	73	128	94	106
Vuelta a España	117	—	—	—	—	—	—	—

==== Classics results timeline ====
Monument	2015	2016	2017	2018	2019	2020	2021	2022	2023	2024	2025	2026
Milan–San Remo	—	—	—	DNF	41	29	10	2	9	—	—	
Tour of Flanders	—	—	—	—	97	4	8	DNF	17	—	—	
Paris–Roubaix	—	—	—	—	18	NH	13	DNF	74	54	39	
Liège–Bastogne–Liège	DNF	127	—	—	—	—	—	—	—	—	—	—
Giro di Lombardia	—	DNF	—	—	—	—	—	—	—	—	—	—
Classic	2015	2016	2017	2018	2019	2020	2021	2022	2023	2024	2025	2026
Omloop Het Nieuwsblad	DNF	—	DNF	34	65	25	15	DNF	96	—	—	8
Kuurne–Brussels–Kuurne	—	—	—	DNF	DNF	13	2	32	95	32	—	—
E3 Saxo Bank Classic (Note: Race known as the E3 BinckBank Classic in 2019.)	—	—	—	—	DNF	NH	12	13	DNF	—	29	—
Gent–Wevelgem	—	—	—	—	14	29	9	26	32	37	12	
Dwars door Vlaanderen	—	—	—	—	2	NH	8	72	138	DNF	—	
Brabantse Pijl	—	—	—	—	—	8	DNF	—	—	16	18	
Paris–Tours	DNF	156	120	74	29	—	16	DNF	13	10	79	

Legend
—	Did not compete
DNF	Did not finish
NH	Not held

=== Cyclo-cross ===
2011–2012
UCI Junior World Cup

2nd Hoogerheide

Junior Coupe de France

2nd Lignières-en-Berry
2nd Besançon
3rd Rodez

2013–2014
Under-23 Coupe de France

2nd Flamanville
3rd Quelneuc
