= Maxime Renault =

French cyclist (born 1990)

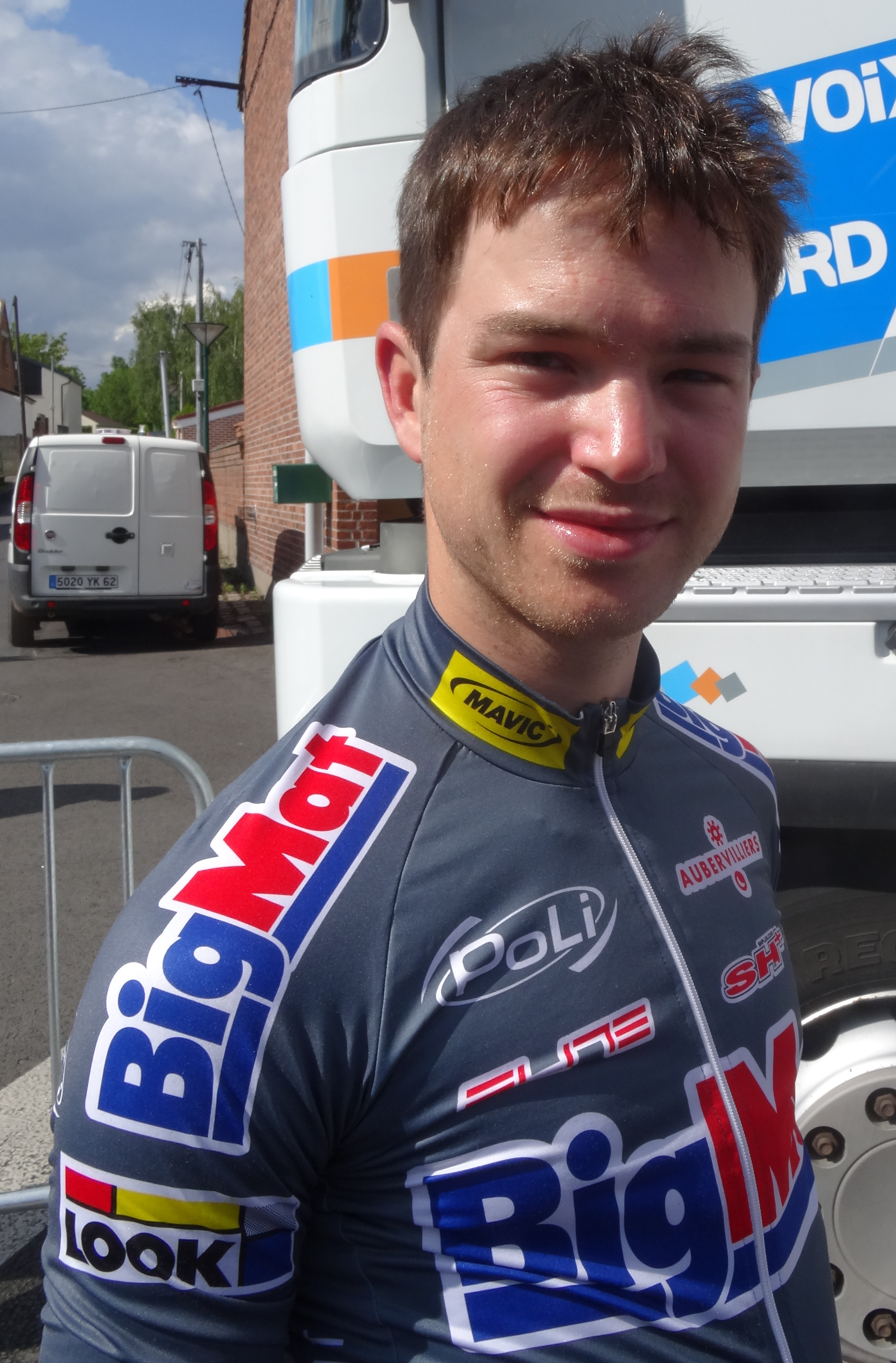
- Renault in 2014

Personal information
- Full name: Maxime Renault
- Born: 2 January 1990 (age 36) Vire, France

Cycling career
- Sport: Cycling
- Current team: WB–Fybolia Locminé
- Discipline: Road
- Role: Rider

Amateur teams
- 2007–2008: VC Saint-Hilaire-du-Harcouët Junior
- 2009: VC Avranches
- 2010–2013: Sojasun espoir–ACNC
- 2017–2018: Sojasun espoir–ACNC
- 2019–: Team Fybolia Locminé

Professional teams
- 2011: Saur–Sojasun (stagiaire)
- 2012: Saur–Sojasun (stagiaire)
- 2013: Sojasun (stagiaire)
- 2014–2016: BigMat–Auber 93

Maxime Renault (born 2 January 1990) is a French cyclist, who currently rides for French amateur team WB–Fybolia Locminé.

== Major results ==
2010
1st Stage 2 Mi-Août en Bretagne
2011
4th Overall Kreiz Breizh Elites
2012
3rd Road race, National Under-23 Road Championships
3rd Paris–Tours Espoirs
2015
6th Tour du Finistère
6th Classic Loire Atlantique
6th Paris–Camembert
8th Grand Prix La Marseillaise
2016
9th Tour du Finistère
