= Julien Duval =

French cyclist

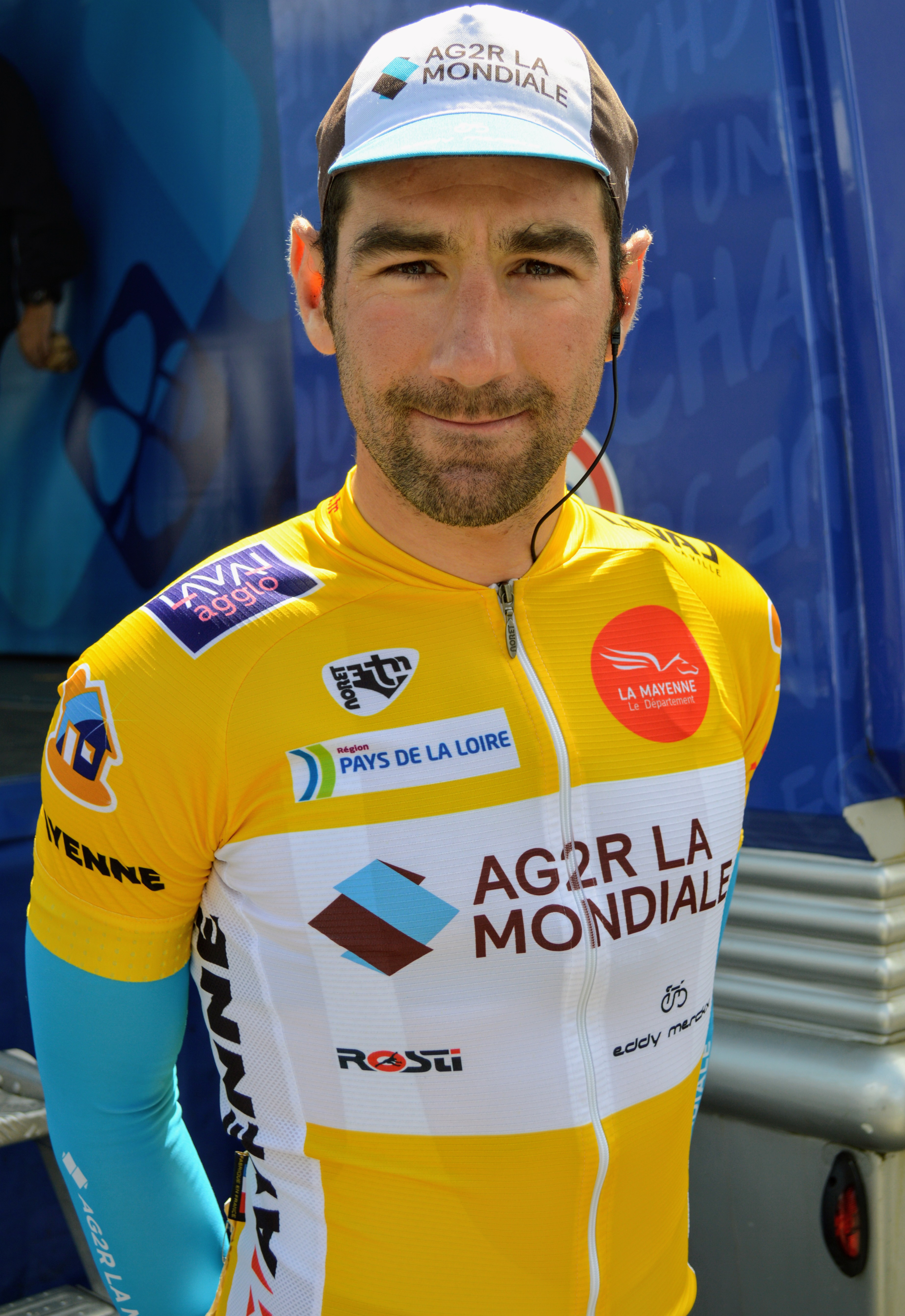
- Julien Duval in 2019

Personal information
- Born: 27 May 1990 (age 36) Évreux, France
- Height: 1.79 m (5 ft 10 in)
- Weight: 68 kg (150 lb)

Cycling career
- Sport: Cycling
- Current team: Retired
- Discipline: Road
- Role: Rider

Professional teams
- 2013–2014: Roubaix–Lille Métropole
- 2015–2017: Armée de Terre
- 2017–2021: AG2R La Mondiale

Julien Duval (born 27 May 1990) is a French former professional racing cyclist, who last rode for UCI WorldTeam AG2R Citroën Team. He rode at the 2015 UCI Track Cycling World Championships, and was named in the startlist for the 2017 Vuelta a España. Duval retired from competition at the end of the 2021 season.

== Major results ==
2007
2nd Team pursuit, UEC European Junior Track Championships
2008
1st Team pursuit, UEC European Junior Track Championships
2010
3rd Team pursuit, UEC European Under-23 Track Championships
2013
1st Mountains classification, Four Days of Dunkirk
2nd Overall Paris–Arras Tour

1st Points classification

3rd Paris–Troyes
5th Grand Prix de la Ville de Lillers
7th Grand Prix de Denain
9th Overall Boucles de la Mayenne
2014
3rd Overall Paris–Arras Tour

1st Stage 1 (TTT)

5th Classic Loire Atlantique
8th Route Adélie
8th La Roue Tourangelle
2015
9th Route Adélie
10th Classica Corsica
2016
3rd La Roue Tourangelle
3rd Polynormande
5th Boucles de l'Aulne
6th Tour de Vendée
7th Overall Boucles de la Mayenne
9th Grand Prix d'Isbergues
2018
3rd Grand Prix de Denain
2019
5th Tour de l'Eurométropole
9th Grand Prix de Fourmies
9th Paris–Chauny

=== Grand Tour general classification results timeline ===
| Grand Tour | 2017 | 2018 |
|---|---|---|
| Giro d'Italia | — | — |
| Tour de France | — | — |
| Vuelta a España | 108 | 157 |

Legend
| — | Did not compete |
| DNF | Did not finish |
