= Samuel Dumoulin =

Road bicycle racer (born 1980)

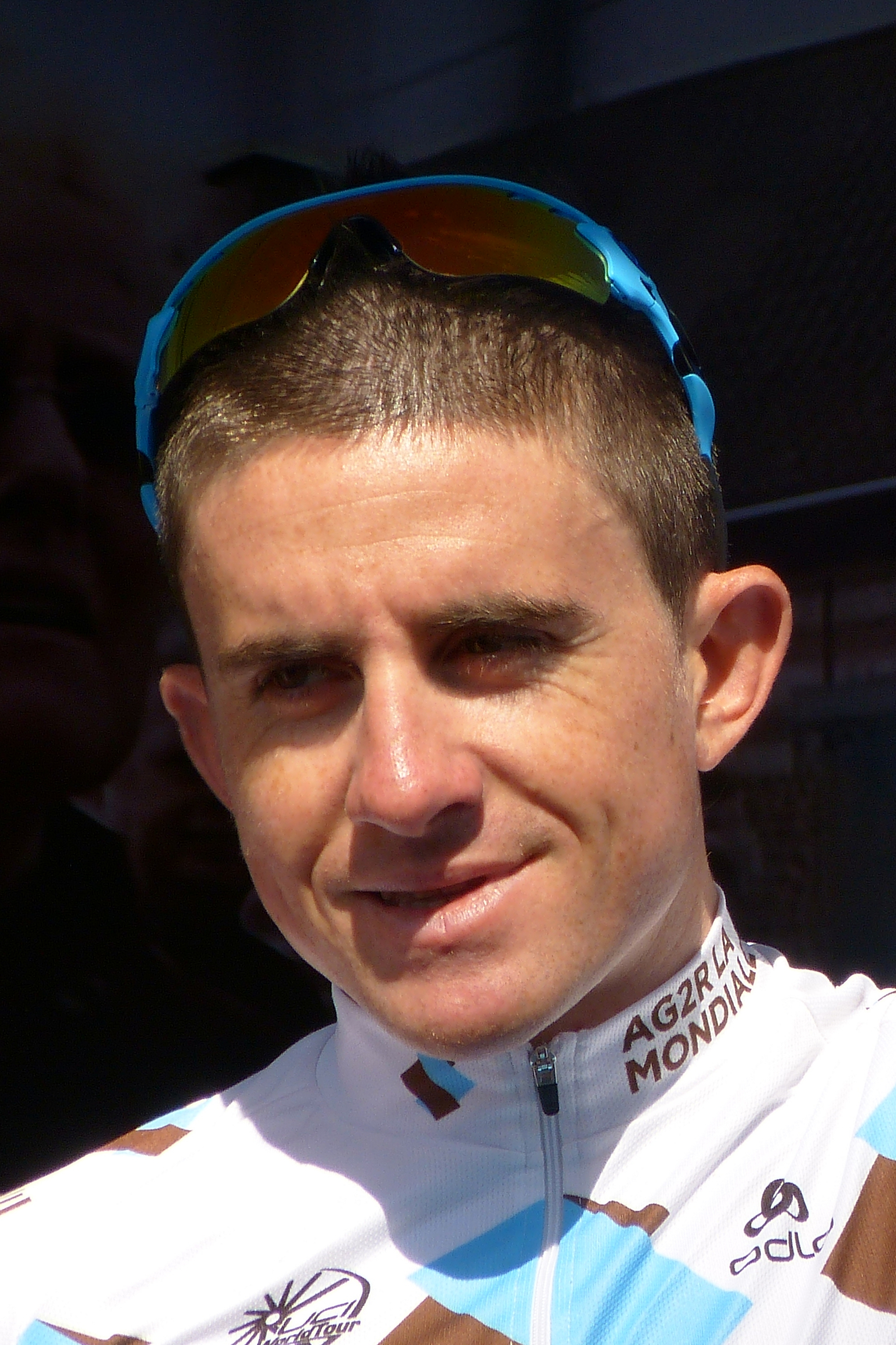
- Dumoulin at the 2013 Four Days of Dunkirk

Personal information
- Full name: Samuel Dumoulin
- Born: 20 August 1980 (age 46) Vénissieux, France
- Height: 1.59 m (5 ft 3 in)
- Weight: 57 kg (126 lb)

Cycling career
- Sport: Cycling
- Current team: B&B Hotels p/b KTM
- Discipline: Road
- Role: Rider (retired); Directeur sportif
- Rider type: Puncheur; Sprinter

Amateur teams
- 2000: Vélo Club de Vaulx-en-Velin
- 2001: Rhône-Alpes
- 2001: Française des Jeux (stagiaire)

Professional teams
- 2002–2003: Jean Delatour
- 2004–2007: AG2R Prévoyance
- 2008–2012: Cofidis
- 2013–2019: Ag2r–La Mondiale

Managerial team
- 2020–: B&B Hotels–Vital Concept

Major wins
- Grand Tours Tour de France 1 individual stage (2008)

Samuel Dumoulin (born 20 August 1980) is a French former professional road bicycle racer, who rode professionally between 2002 and 2019 for the Jean Delatour, Cofidis and AG2R La Mondiale teams. He now works as a directeur sportif for UCI ProTeam B&B Hotels p/b KTM.

== Career ==
Dumoulin rode as an amateur for the TCCT (Tonic cyclo club of Ternay). He won the national youth championship in 1996, then the espoir (young professional) Paris–Tours and Paris-Auxerre in 2001.

He dropped out of the 2004 Tour de France when he crashed after hitting a dog. Recovery took him four months and he did not race for the rest of the season. In 2008 he won the third stage after a breakaway of nearly 200 kilometres (120 miles), beating Will Frischkorn and Romain Feillu.

== Major results ==
2001
1st Stage 1 Tour de l'Ain
8th Road race, UEC European Under-23 Road Championships
2002
1st Stage 4 Tour de l'Avenir
2003
1st Overall Tour de Normandie
1st Tro-Bro Léon
2nd Overall Tour de l'Ain
3rd Overall Tour de l'Avenir

1st Stages 4 & 10

2004
1st Tro-Bro Léon
2005
1st Stage 2 Critérium du Dauphiné Libéré
2nd Overall Tour du Limousin

1st Stage 2

7th Trophée des Grimpeurs
9th Paris–Camembert
2006
1st Route Adélie
3rd Grand Prix de Plumelec-Morbihan
6th Overall Tour Down Under
7th Vattenfall Cyclassics
2007
8th Trophée des Grimpeurs
2008
1st Stage 3 Tour de France
1st Stage 2 Circuit de la Sarthe
Tour du Poitou-Charentes

1st Stages 2 & 5

4th Tour de Vendée
5th Grand Prix d'Ouverture La Marseillaise
9th Vattenfall Cyclassics
10th Grand Prix de Fourmies
2009
1st Points classification Volta a Catalunya
1st Stage 2 Tour du Limousin
3rd Gran Premio dell'Insubria-Lugano
7th GP Ouest–France
2010
1st Overall Étoile de Bessèges

1st Stage 3

1st Gran Premio dell'Insubria-Lugano
1st Stage 6 Volta a Catalunya
3rd Grand Prix d'Ouverture La Marseillaise
4th Overall La Tropicale Amissa Bongo

1st Stage 1

8th Overall Circuit de la Sarthe

1st Stage 3

2011
1st Overall Paris–Corrèze

1st Stage 1

Volta a Catalunya

1st Stages 5 & 7

1st Stage 3 Étoile de Bessèges
3rd Hel van het Mergelland
3rd London–Surrey Cycle Classic
7th Overall Tour du Haut Var

1st Stage 1

7th Gran Premio dell'Insubria-Lugano
9th Paris–Bourges
2012
1st Overall French Road Cycling Cup
1st Grand Prix d'Ouverture La Marseillaise
2nd Tour du Finistère
2nd Grand Prix de Plumelec-Morbihan
2nd Polynormande
4th Tour du Doubs
5th Grand Prix d'Isbergues
6th Overall Tour de Luxembourg
6th Paris–Bourges
7th Boucles de l'Aulne
7th Tour de Vendée
9th GP Ouest–France
2013
1st Overall French Road Cycling Cup
1st Grand Prix de Plumelec-Morbihan
1st Stage 5 Étoile de Bessèges
2nd Grand Prix d'Ouverture La Marseillaise
2nd Tour de Vendée
3rd GP Ouest–France
3rd Paris–Bourges
6th Overall Tour du Haut Var
6th Overall Four Days of Dunkirk
7th Les Boucles du Sud Ardèche
7th Paris–Camembert
7th Grand Prix d'Isbergues
7th Paris–Tours
10th Brussels Cycling Classic
2014
2nd Overall Tour du Haut Var
2nd Paris–Camembert
3rd Grand Prix d'Ouverture La Marseillaise
4th Overall Four Days of Dunkirk
7th Grand Prix de la Somme
7th Grand Prix de Plumelec-Morbihan
7th Grand Prix d'Isbergues
9th Tour du Doubs
2015
1st La Drôme Classic
3rd Paris–Camembert
5th Grand Prix de Denain
6th La Roue Tourangelle
7th Grand Prix de Fourmies
8th Down Under Classic
8th Route Adélie
9th Grand Prix de Plumelec-Morbihan
9th Paris–Bourges
10th Grand Prix d'Isbergues
2016
1st Overall French Road Cycling Cup
1st La Roue Tourangelle
1st Grand Prix de Plumelec-Morbihan
1st Boucles de l'Aulne
1st Tour du Doubs
2nd Tour du Finistère
2nd Tour de Vendée
3rd Route Adélie
4th Road race, UEC European Road Championships
4th Paris–Camembert
4th Polynormande
8th Paris–Bourges
9th Grand Prix de Fourmies
10th Grand Prix de la Somme
2017
1st Stage 1 Tour du Haut Var
2nd Paris–Camembert
3rd Grand Prix de Plumelec-Morbihan
5th Classic Loire-Atlantique
9th La Drôme Classic
10th Grand Prix d'Ouverture La Marseillaise
2018
2nd La Roue Tourangelle
3rd Grand Prix de Plumelec-Morbihan
4th La Drôme Classic
5th Grand Prix d'Isbergues
6th Polynormande
7th Route Adélie
9th Classic Loire-Atlantique
2019
8th La Roue Tourangelle
9th Grand Prix de Denain

=== Grand Tour general classification results timeline ===
Grand Tour	2003	2004	2005	2006	2007	2008	2009	2010	2011	2012	2013	2014	2015	2016
Giro d'Italia	Did not contest during his career													
Tour de France	141	DNF	114	120	—	112	139	DNF	162	107	143	90	—	130
Vuelta a España	—	—	—	—	—	—	—	124	—	—	—	—	—	—

Legend
—	Did not compete
DNF	Did not finish
