= Jimmy Turgis =

French cyclist

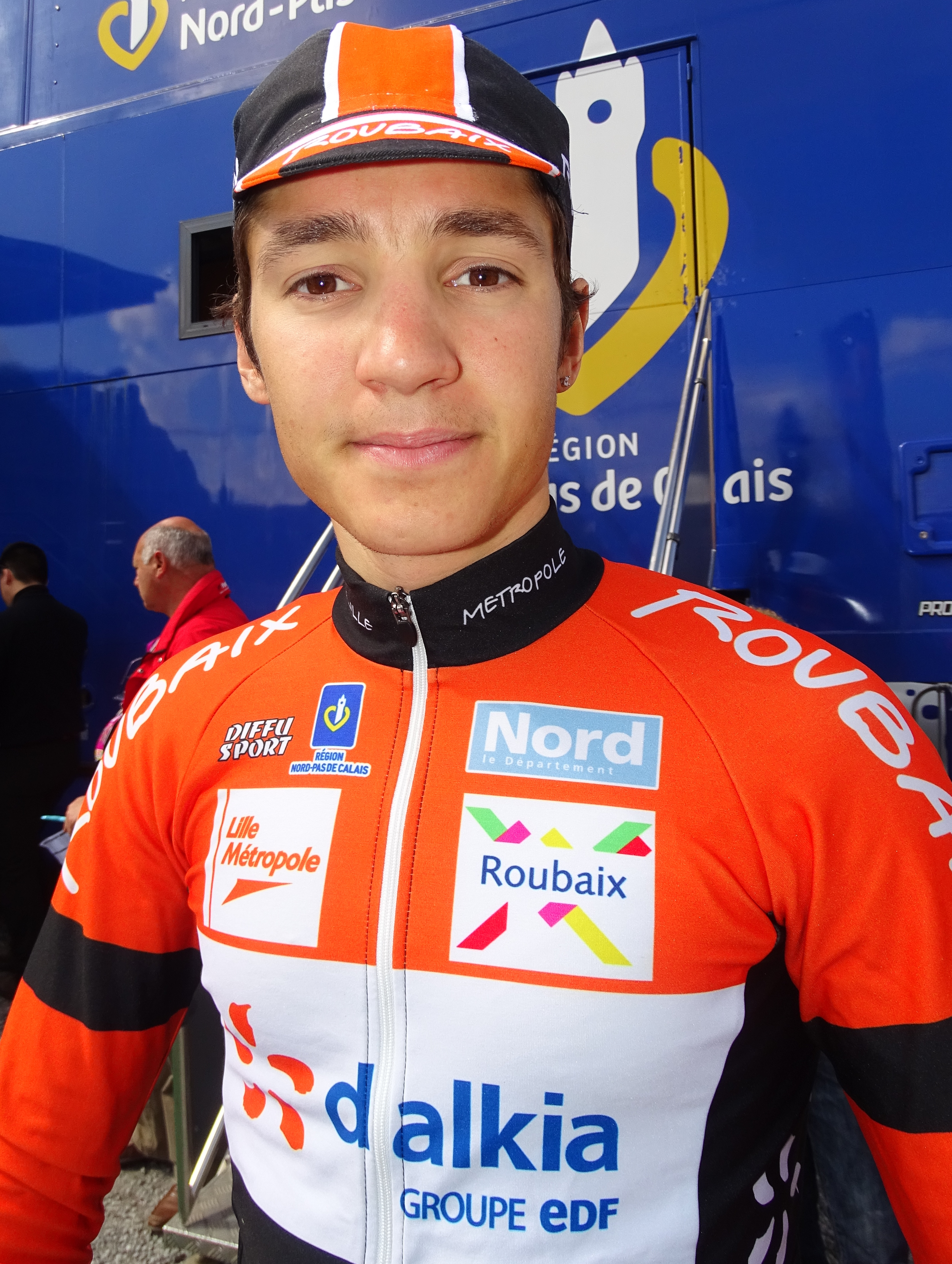
- Turgis in 2015

Personal information
- Full name: Jimmy Turgis
- Born: 10 August 1991 (age 35) Bourg-la-Reine, France
- Height: 1.75 m (5 ft 9 in)
- Weight: 63 kg (139 lb)

Cycling career
- Sport: Cycling
- Current team: Arkéa–B&B Hotels
- Discipline: Road
- Role: Rider (retired); Directeur sportif; Coach

Amateur teams
- 2010–2013: CC Nogent-sur-Oise
- 2012: Cofidis (stagiaire)

Professional teams
- 2014–2016: Roubaix–Lille Métropole
- 2017–2018: Cofidis
- 2019–2020: Vital Concept–B&B Hotels

Managerial team
- 2022: B&B Hotels–KTM
- 2024–: Arkéa–B&B Hotels

Jimmy Turgis (born 10 August 1991) is a French former professional cyclist, who rode professionally between 2014 and 2020 for the Roubaix–Métropole Européenne de Lille, Cofidis and B&B Hotels–Vital Concept teams. He competed in one Grand Tour during his career, the 2017 Vuelta a España. He now works as a coach for UCI WorldTeam Arkéa–B&B Hotels.

His brothers Tanguy and Anthony have also competed as a professional cyclists.

== Major results ==
2009
2nd Time trial, National Junior Road Championships
3rd Chrono des Nations Juniors
2010
10th Chrono des Nations Espoirs
2011
9th Under-23 race, UCI Cyclo-cross World Championships
2012
5th Liège–Bastogne–Liège Espoirs
2013
1st Young rider classification Ronde de l'Oise
3rd Under-23 race, National Cyclo-cross Championships
3rd Grand Prix de la ville de Pérenchies
2014
1st Sprints classification Tour des Pays de Savoie
4th Ronde Pévéloise
7th Overall Ronde de l'Oise
8th Kattekoers
9th Overall Tour du Limousin
2015
10th Grand Prix de Plumelec-Morbihan
2016
10th Cholet-Pays de Loire
2018
9th Grand Prix de Denain
10th Polynormande

=== Grand Tour general classification results timeline ===
Grand Tour	2017
Giro d'Italia	—
Tour de France	—
Vuelta a España	DNF

Legend
—	Did not compete
DNF	Did not finish
