= Thibault Ferasse =

French cyclist

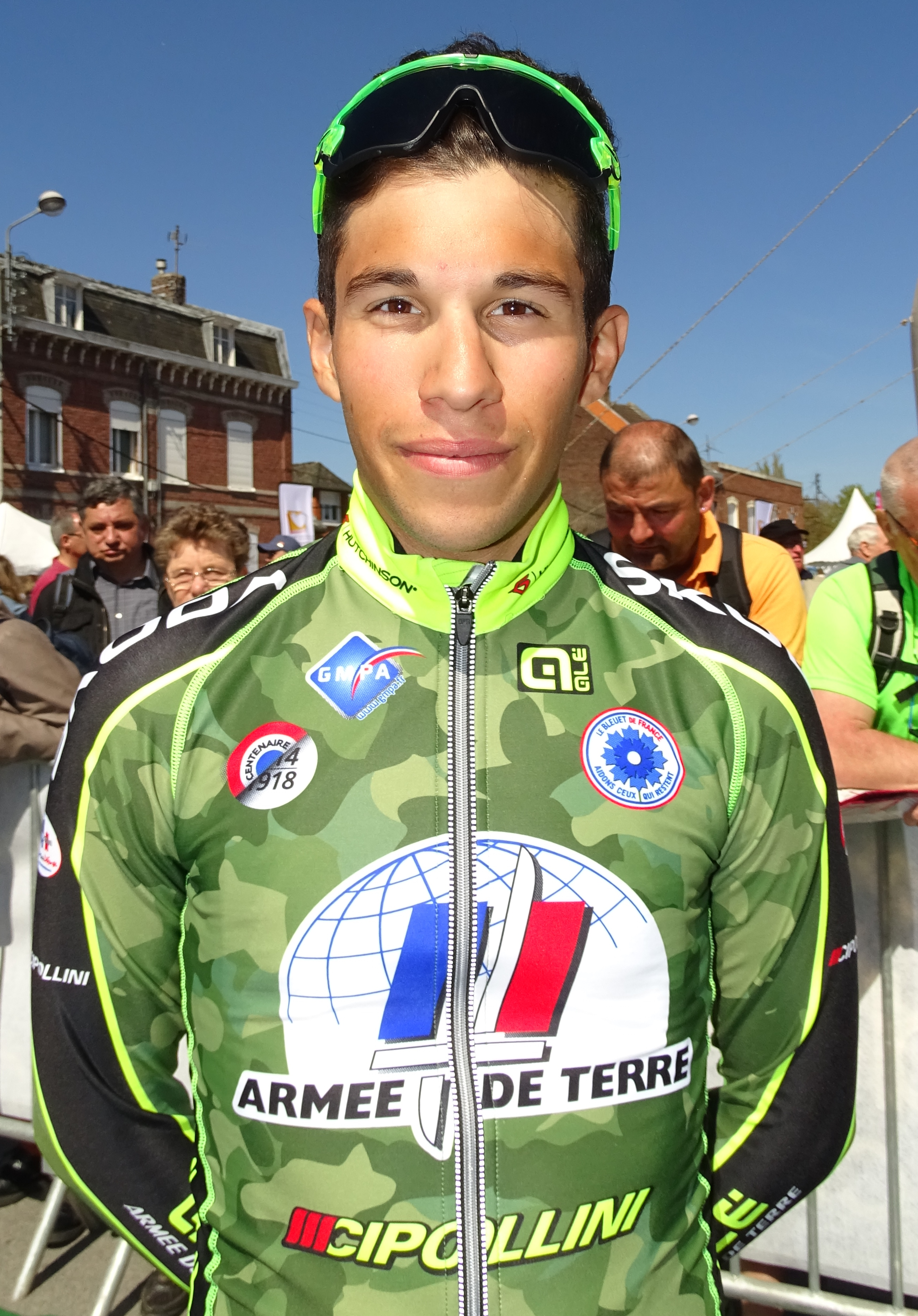
- Ferasse in 2016

Personal information
- Full name: Thibault Ferasse
- Born: 12 September 1994 (age 32) Saint-Brieuc, France
- Height: 1.68 m (5 ft 6 in)
- Weight: 61 kg (134 lb)

Cycling career
- Sport: Cycling
- Current team: Retired
- Discipline: Road
- Role: Rider

Amateur teams
- 2012: Team UC Nantes Atlantique Junior
- 2013–2015: Team UC Nantes Atlantique
- 2018: Team UC Nantes Atlantique

Professional teams
- 2016–2017: Armée de Terre
- 2019–2020: Natura4Ever–Roubaix–Lille Métropole
- 2021–2022: B&B Hotels p/b KTM

Thibault Ferasse (born 12 September 1994 in Saint-Brieuc) is a French former professional road cyclist, who competed as a professional from 2016 to 2022.

== Major results ==
2016
3rd Tour du Doubs
2017
2nd Grand Prix des Marbriers
6th Tour du Doubs
6th Grand Prix de la Somme
8th Tour du Finistère
9th Grand Prix Cerami
9th Grand Prix de Plumelec-Morbihan
2018
1st Mountains classification Tour de Bretagne
2019
1st Overall Boucles de la Mayenne
10th Boucles de l'Aulne
10th Classic Loire Atlantique
2021
7th Tour de Vendée
2022
3rd Paris–Camembert
8th Vuelta a Murcia
