= Flavien Dassonville =

French cyclist

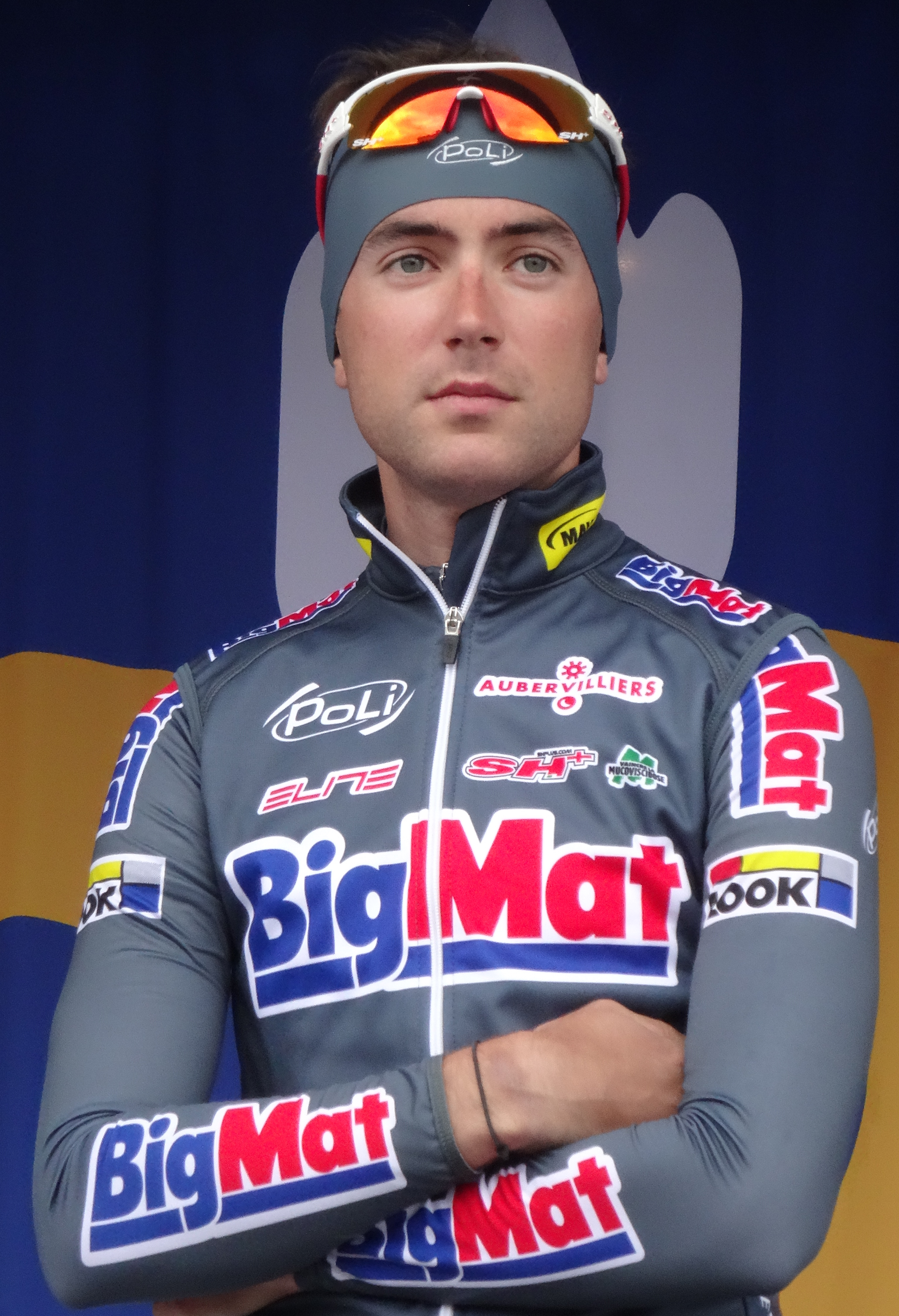
- Dassonville in 2014

Personal information
- Full name: Flavien Dassonville
- Born: 16 February 1991 (age 35) Montdidier, Somme, France

Cycling career
- Sport: Cycling
- Current team: Retired
- Discipline: Road
- Role: Rider

Amateur teams
- 2010: CC Nogent-sur-Oise
- 2018: CC Nogent-sur-Oise

Professional team
- 2011–2017: BigMat–Auber 93

Flavien Dassonville (born 16 February 1991) is a French former professional cyclist.

== Major results ==
2013
1st Road race, National Under-23 Road Championships
1st Paris–Tours Espoirs
2014
2nd Tro-Bro Léon
3rd Paris-Troyes
8th Overall Boucles de la Mayenne
8th Classic Loire Atlantique
2016
1st Mountains classification Tour du Limousin
4th Overall Circuit des Ardennes

1st Mountains classification

2017
1st Overall Tour de Bretagne

1st Stage 2

1st Overall Ronde de l'Oise

1st Stage 1

1st La Roue Tourangelle
6th Overall Boucles de la Mayenne
9th Classic Loire Atlantique
2018
7th Grand Prix des Marbriers
