= Romain Combaud =

French bicycle racer

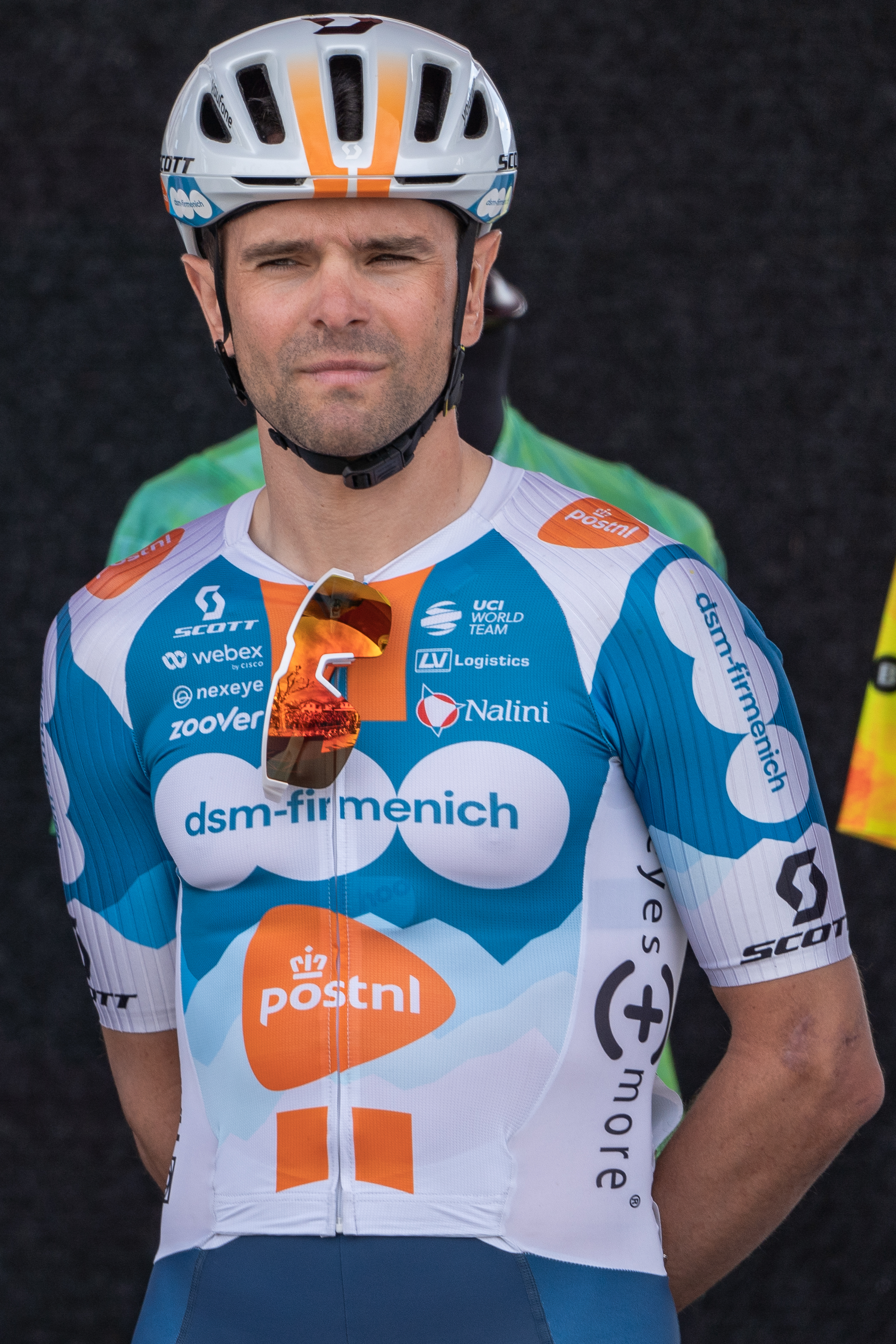
- Combaud in 2024

Personal information
- Full name: Romain Combaud
- Born: 1 April 1991 (age 35) Saint-Doulchard, France
- Height: 1.75 m (5 ft 9 in)
- Weight: 64 kg (141 lb)

Cycling career
- Sport: Cycling
- Current team: Team Picnic–PostNL
- Discipline: Road
- Role: Rider

Amateur teams
- 2010: Guidon Chalettois
- 2011–2014: Armée de Terre

Professional teams
- 2015: Armée de Terre
- 2016–2020: Delko–Marseille Provence KTM
- 2021–2025: Team DSM

Major wins
- Grand Tours Vuelta a España 1 TTT stage (2023)

Romain Combaud (born 1 April 1991 in Saint-Doulchard) is a French former professional cyclist, who last rode for UCI WorldTeam Team Picnic–PostNL.

== Major results ==
2014
3rd Paris–Mantes-en-Yvelines
5th Grand Prix des Marbriers
5th Paris–Troyes
2015
1st Mountains classification Tour du Limousin
4th Tour du Doubs
5th Overall Boucles de la Mayenne
6th Polynormande
8th Classic Sud-Ardèche
9th Classic Loire Atlantique
2017
4th Tour de Vendée
5th Paris–Camembert
10th Trofeo Laigueglia
2018
4th Overall Circuit de la Sarthe
7th Overall Tour du Limousin
7th Trofeo Laigueglia
2019
2nd Grand Prix La Marseillaise
8th Overall Circuit de la Sarthe
2020
5th Overall Tour du Limousin
2023
1st Stage 1 (TTT) Vuelta a España

=== Grand Tour general classification results timeline ===
Grand Tour	2022	2023	2024	2025
Giro d'Italia	104	—	—	—
Tour de France	—	—	—	—
Vuelta a España	—	119	—	—

Legend
—	Did not compete
DNF	Did not finish
IP	In progress
