= Jérémy Leveau =

French cyclist

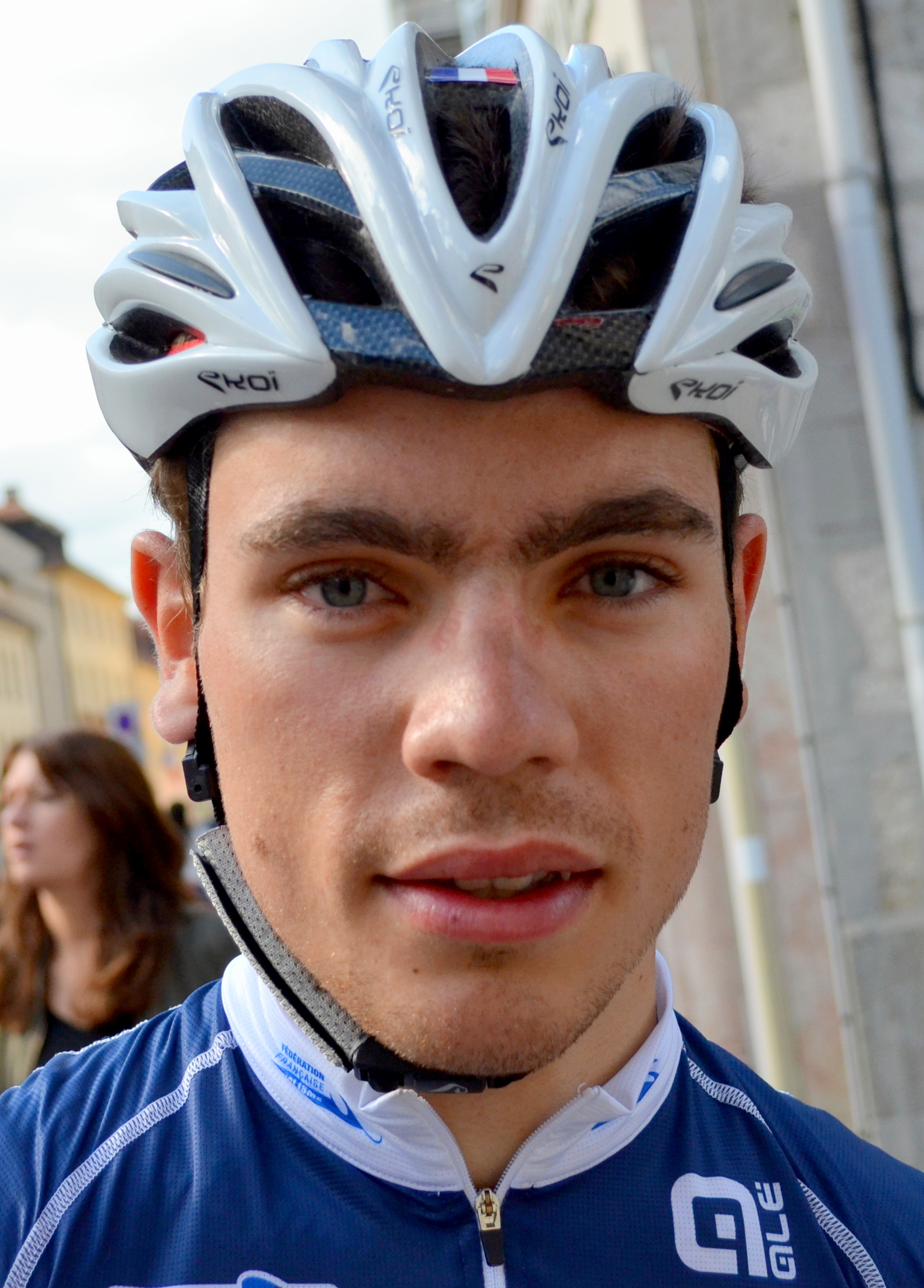
- Leveau in 2014.

Personal information
- Full name: Jérémy Leveau
- Born: 17 April 1992 (age 34) Argentan, France

Cycling career
- Sport: Cycling
- Current team: Retired
- Discipline: Road
- Role: Rider

Amateur teams
- 2011: Véranda Rideau Sarthe
- 2012: USSA Pavilly Barentin
- 2013: Armée de Terre
- 2014: VC Rouen 76
- 2014: Roubaix–Lille Métropole (stagiaire)

Professional teams
- 2015–2017: Roubaix–Lille Métropole
- 2018–2019: Delko–Marseille Provence KTM
- 2020–2024: Natura4Ever–Roubaix–Lille Métropole

Jérémy Leveau (born 17 April 1992 in Argentan) is a French former cyclist, who competed as a professional from 2015 to 2024. In his career, he rode for UCI Professional Continental team Delko–Marseille Provence and UCI Continental team Natura4Ever–Roubaix–Lille Métropole.

== Major results ==
2014
1st Road race, National Under-23 Road Championships
2015
4th Paris–Troyes
2017
3rd Road race, National Road Championships
4th Polynormande
5th Paris–Troyes
5th Grote Prijs Jean-Pierre Monseré
6th Classic Loire-Atlantique
6th Paris–Camembert
6th Tour de Vendée
2020
7th Tour du Doubs
2021
9th Grand Prix de la ville de Nogent-sur-Oise
2022
4th Overall Circuit de la Sarthe
2023
3rd Flèche de Locminé
3rd Trofee Maarten Wynants
4th Overall Région Pays de la Loire Tour
5th Overall Tour d'Eure-et-Loir
5th Boucles de la Loire
7th Tour de Vendée
