= Laurent Pichon =

French cyclist (born 1986)

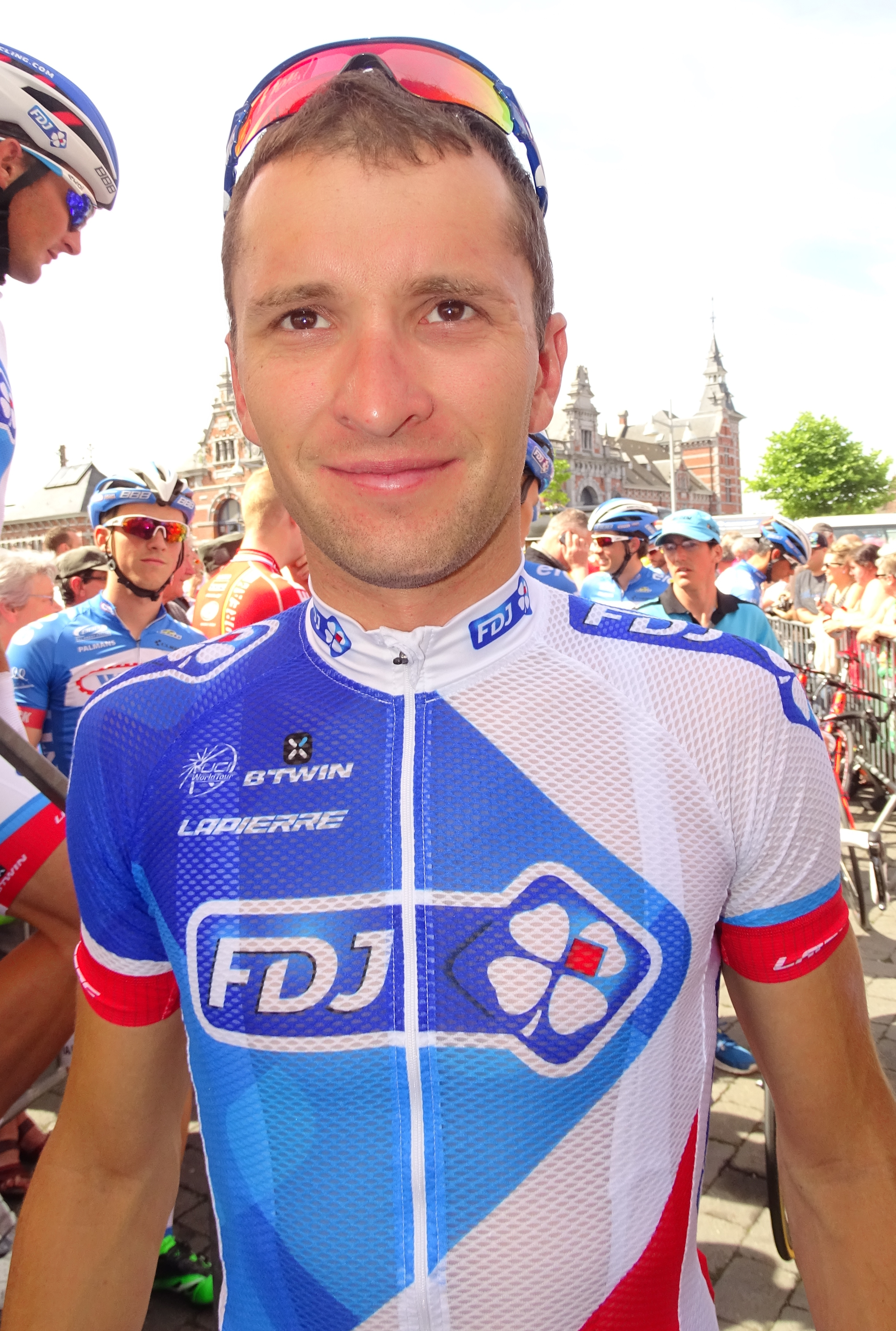
- Pichon in 2015

Personal information
- Full name: Laurent Pichon
- Born: 19 July 1986 (age 40) Quimper, France
- Height: 1.78 m (5 ft 10 in)
- Weight: 69 kg (152 lb; 10 st 12 lb)

Cycling career
- Sport: Cycling
- Current team: Retired
- Discipline: Road
- Role: Rider
- Rider type: Puncheur

Professional teams
- 2010–2012: Bretagne–Schuller
- 2013–2016: FDJ
- 2017–2023: Fortuneo–Vital Concept

Laurent Pichon (born 19 July 1986) is a French former racing cyclist, who competed as a professional from 2010 to 2023. He was named in the start list for the 2015 Vuelta a España. In June 2017, he was named in the startlist for the Tour de France. He was the winner of the 2017 French Road Cycling Cup.

Pichon was born in Finistère. Thrice has he placed in the top 10 at the Tro-Bro Léon, each time earning himself a piglet. The piglets, won in 2016, 2017, and 2022; and named Ty Pich, Ty Pich 2, and Pitchounette; were made into sausages and eaten by Pichon.

== Major results ==
2009
10th Overall Kreiz Breizh Elites
2010
1st Scratch race, National Track Championships
1st Stage 7 Tour de Normandie
2nd Route Adélie
2nd Boucles de l'Aulne
4th Val d'Ille Classic
6th Overall Kreiz Breizh Elites
8th Overall Paris–Corrèze
8th Paris–Bourges
10th Grand Prix de Plumelec-Morbihan
2011
1st Overall Kreiz Breizh Elites
2nd Overall Circuit des Ardennes

1st Stage 3

2nd Overall Four Days of Dunkirk
4th Tour de Vendée
5th Overall Boucles de la Mayenne
5th Rund um den Finanzplatz Eschborn-Frankfurt
8th Flèche d'Emeraude
9th Route Adélie
10th Paris–Troyes
2012
1st Overall Boucles de la Mayenne
2nd Route Adélie
2nd Boucles de l'Aulne
5th Overall Circuit de Lorraine
5th Paris–Tours
6th Tour de Vendée
8th Overall Four Days of Dunkirk
2013
3rd Classic Loire Atlantique
4th Tour de Vendée
8th Val d'Ille Classic
9th Route Adélie
10th Paris–Camembert
2014
3rd Paris–Camembert
5th Tour de Vendée
7th Grand Prix d'Ouverture La Marseillaise
2015
3rd Boucles de l'Aulne
9th Grand Prix Pino Cerami
2016
4th Tro-Bro Léon
9th Overall Tour de Wallonie
Vuelta a España

Held after Stage 2
Held after Stage 2

2017 (3 pro wins)
1st Overall French Road Cycling Cup
1st Route Adélie
1st Classic Loire Atlantique
1st Stage 1a Settimana Internazionale di Coppi e Bartali
3rd Polynormande
3rd Boucles de l'Aulne
4th Tro-Bro Léon
7th Paris–Camembert
7th Grand Prix de Plumelec-Morbihan
8th Grand Prix d'Isbergues
9th Grand Prix de Fourmies
10th Overall Four Days of Dunkirk
2018
6th Overall Arctic Race of Norway
10th Paris–Camembert
Combativity award Stage 7 Tour de France
2019
5th Overall Kreiz Breizh Elites
2020
4th Grand Prix de la Ville de Lillers
2021
4th Boucles de l'Aulne
2022
7th Tro-Bro Léon
8th Paris–Roubaix
2023
7th Tro-Bro Léon
Combativity award Stage 3 Tour de France

=== Grand Tour general classification results timeline ===
| Grand Tour | 2013 | 2014 | 2015 | 2016 | 2017 | 2018 | 2019 | 2020 | 2021 | 2022 | 2023 |
|---|---|---|---|---|---|---|---|---|---|---|---|
| Giro d'Italia | 163 | 129 | — | — | — | — | — | — | — | — | — |
| Tour de France | — | — | — | — | 125 | 98 | — | — | — | — | 124 |
| Vuelta a España | — | — | 111 | DNF | — | — | — | — | — | — | |

Legend
| — | Did not compete |
| DNF | Did not finish |
