= 2017 Tour de France =

2017 UCI World Tour, race 25 of 37
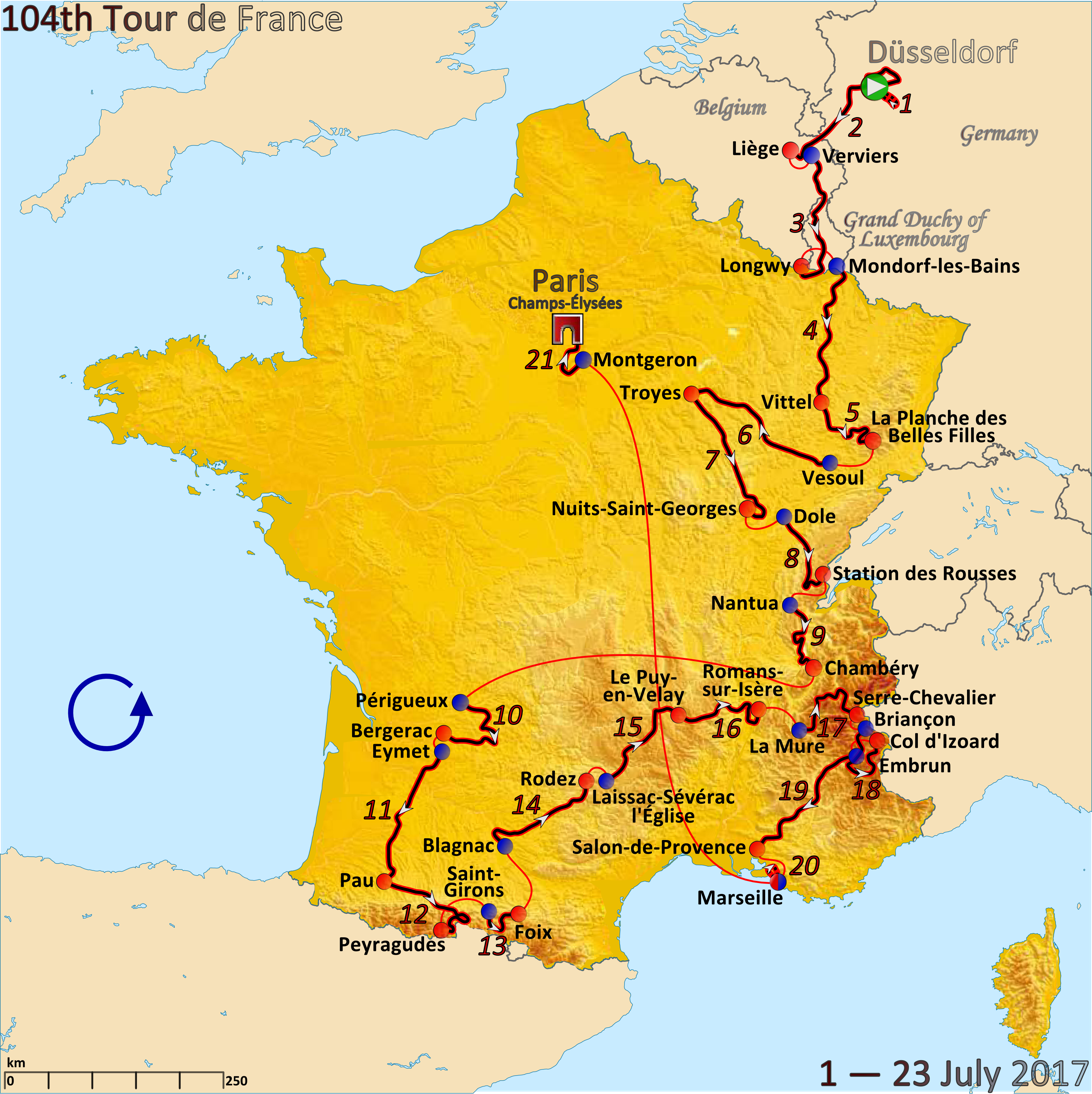
- Route of the 2017 Tour de France

Race details
- Dates: 1–23 July 2017
- Stages: 21
- Distance: 3,540 km (2,200 mi)
- Winning time: 86h 20' 55"

Results
Jersey awarded to the overall winner	Winner	Chris Froome (GBR)	(Team Sky)
	Second	Rigoberto Urán (COL)	(Cannondale–Drapac)
	Third	Romain Bardet (FRA)	(AG2R La Mondiale)
Jersey awarded to the points classification winner	Points	Michael Matthews (AUS)	(Team Sunweb)
Jersey awarded to the mountains classification winner	Mountains	Warren Barguil (FRA)	(Team Sunweb)
Jersey awarded to the young rider classification winner	Young rider	Simon Yates (GBR)	(Orica–Scott)
Jersey awarded to the combativity classification winner	Combativity	Warren Barguil (FRA)	(Team Sunweb)
Jersey awarded to the team classification winner	Team	(United Kingdom) Team Sky	

The 2017 Tour de France was the 104th edition of the Tour de France, one of cycling's Grand Tours. The 21-stage race took place across 3,540 km (2,200 mi), commencing with an individual time trial in Düsseldorf, Germany on 1 July, and concluding with the Champs-Élysées stage in Paris on 23 July. A total of 198 riders from 22 teams entered the race. The overall general classification won by Chris Froome of Team Sky, his third consecutive victory and fourth overall. Rigoberto Urán (Cannondale–Drapac) and Romain Bardet (AG2R La Mondiale) finished second and third, respectively.

Geraint Thomas (Team Sky) won the opening stage and became the Tour's first rider that year to wear the general classification leader's yellow jersey. Froome, who performed the best in the opening stage out of the pre-race favourites, took the lead after the fifth stage's summit finish. He held the lead until it was taken by Fabio Aru (Astana) at the end of stage twelve, where Froome lost time on the steep summit finish to Peyragudes. Froome retook the yellow jersey after the fourteenth stage and held it until the end of the race.

The points classification was won by Michael Matthews of Team Sunweb, with teammate Warren Barguil, winner of two high mountain stages, taking the mountains classification as well as the award for most combative rider. Orica–Scott's Simon Yates, in seventh place overall, won the young rider classification. The team classification was won by Team Sky.

== Teams ==
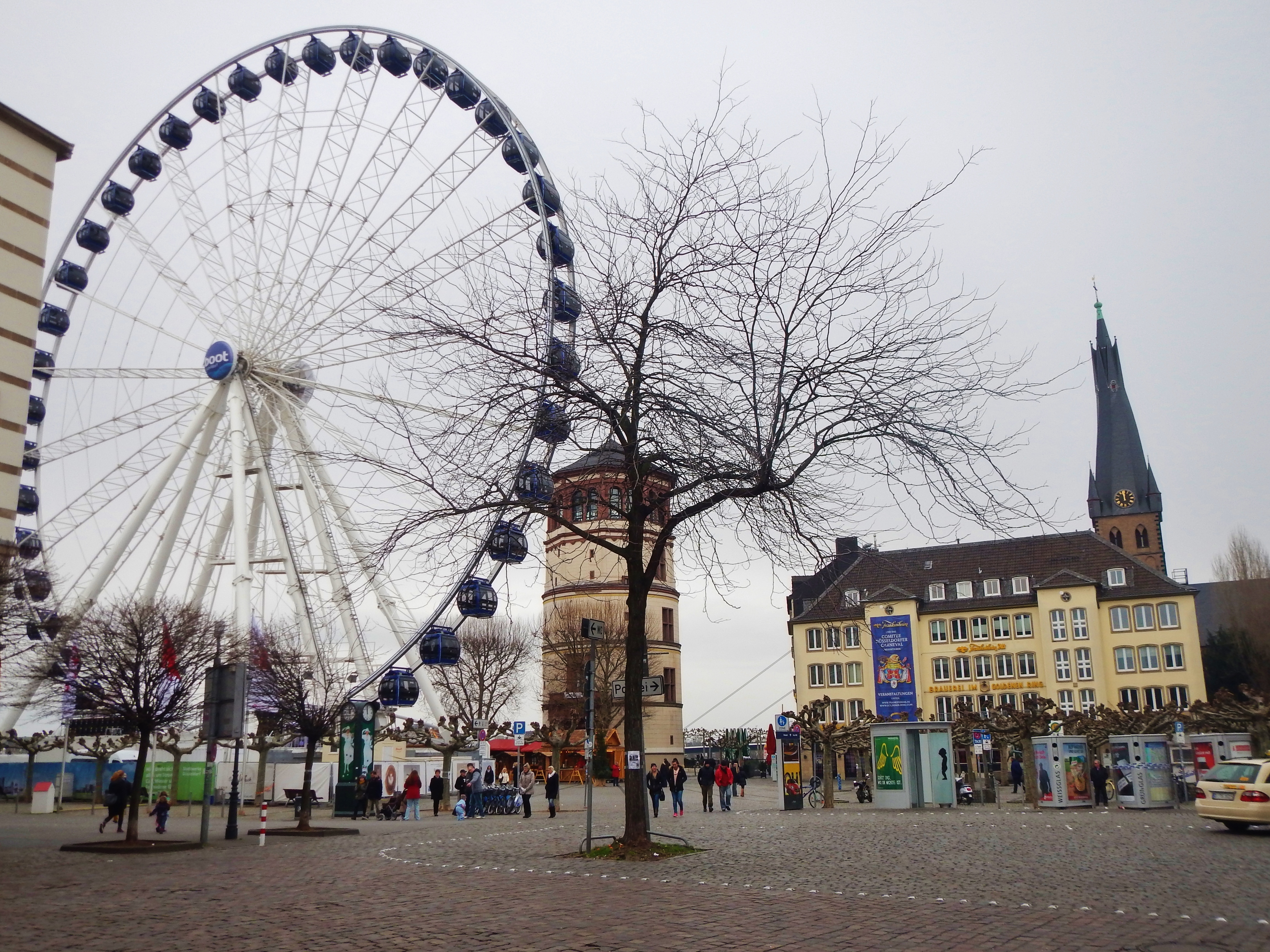
The Burgplatz square in Düsseldorf, Germany, hosted the team presentation ceremony on 29 June.

The 2017 edition of the Tour de France consisted of 22 teams. The race was the 25th of the 38 events in the UCI World Tour, and all of its eighteen UCI WorldTeams were entitled, and obliged, to enter the race. On 26 January 2017, the organiser of the Tour, Amaury Sport Organisation (ASO), announced the four second-tier UCI Professional Continental teams that were given wildcard invitations, of which three were French-based (Cofidis, Direct Énergie and Fortuneo–Oscaro) and one was Belgian (Wanty–Groupe Gobert, which participated in the race for the first time). Fortuneo–Oscaro were initially invited to the race as Fortuneo–Vital Concept, before a change of sponsorship prior to the opening day of racing. The presentation of the teams – where the members of each team's roster are introduced in front of the media and local dignitaries – took place in front of a crowd of 15,000 at the Burgplatz square in Düsseldorf, Germany, on 29 June, two days before the opening stage held in the city.

Each squad was allowed a maximum of nine riders, resulting in a start list total of 198. Of these, 49 were competing in their first Tour de France. The riders came from 32 countries. Six countries had more than 10 riders in the race: France (39), Italy (18), Belgium (16), Germany (16), the Netherlands (15), and Spain (13). The average age of riders in the race was 29.4 years, ranging from the 22-year-old Élie Gesbert (Fortuneo–Oscaro) to the 40-year-old Haimar Zubeldia (Trek–Segafredo). Cannondale–Drapac had the youngest average age while Team Dimension Data had the oldest.

The teams entering the race were:

UCI WorldTeams

- AG2R La Mondiale
- Astana
- Bahrain–Merida
- BMC Racing Team
- Bora–Hansgrohe
- Cannondale–Drapac
- Team Dimension Data
- FDJ
- Team Katusha–Alpecin
- LottoNL–Jumbo
- Lotto–Soudal
- Movistar Team
- Orica–Scott
- Quick-Step Floors
- Team Sky
- Team Sunweb
- Trek–Segafredo
- UAE Team Emirates

UCI Professional Continental teams

- Cofidis
- Direct Énergie
- Fortuneo–Oscaro
- Wanty–Groupe Gobert

== Pre-race favourites ==
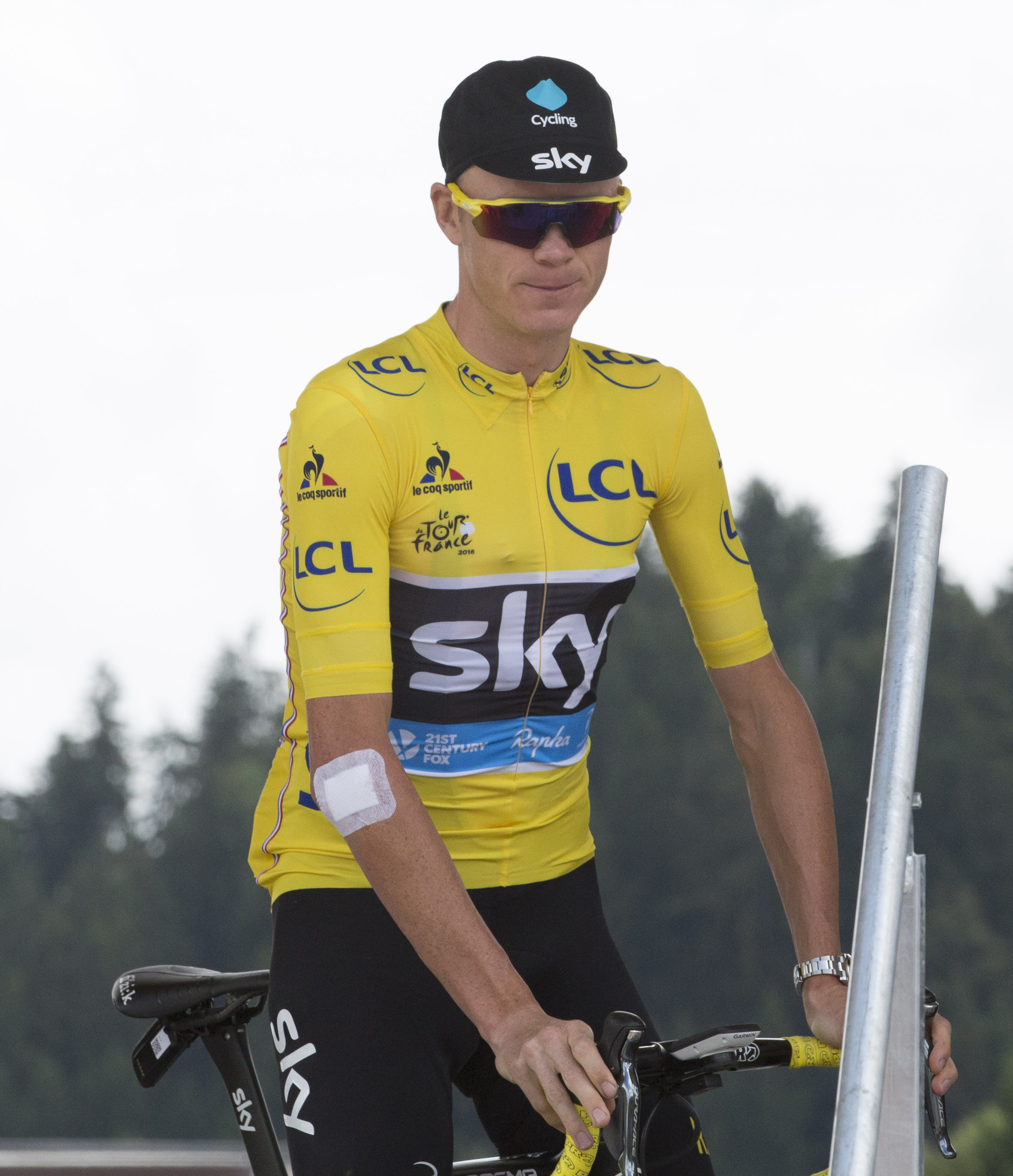
Three-time winner Chris Froome of Team Sky (pictured at the 2016 Tour) was the leading pre-race favourite for the general classification.

In the lead up to the 2017 Tour de France, Chris Froome (Team Sky) was seen by many pundits as the top pre-race favourite for the general classification. His closest rivals were thought to be Richie Porte (BMC Racing Team), Nairo Quintana (Movistar Team), Alberto Contador (Trek–Segafredo), Romain Bardet (AG2R La Mondiale) and Fabio Aru (Astana). The other riders considered contenders for the general classification were Alejandro Valverde (Movistar Team), Jakob Fuglsang (Astana), Thibaut Pinot (FDJ), Esteban Chaves (Orica–Scott), Geraint Thomas (Team Sky), Dan Martin (Quick-Step Floors), Simon Yates (Orica–Scott), and Louis Meintjes (UAE Team Emirates).

Froome, who won the 2013, 2015 and 2016 editions of the Tour, had not won a race in the 2017 season prior to the Tour's start. His best result was fourth overall at the Critérium du Dauphiné, a race considered to be the warm-up for the Tour and one he has won before his three previous Tour victories. Despite this, he was thought to have one of the strongest teams in the race that would ride in total support of him. The 32-year-old Porte, who placed fifth in the 2016 Tour, won the general classification in two stage races so far in 2017, the Tour Down Under and the Tour de Romandie, and came second in the Dauphiné. Quintana, third in the 2016 Tour, placed second at the Giro d'Italia, with overalls wins at the Tirreno–Adriatico and the Volta a la Comunitat Valenciana earlier in the season. The two-time winner (2007 and 2009) 34-year-old Contador came second overall in four stage races in 2017 before the Tour, Paris–Nice, the Vuelta a Andalucía, the Volta a Catalunya and the Tour of the Basque Country. Bardet, the 2016 Tour runner-up, placed sixth overall in the Dauphiné, with his best other result sixth in the one-day Classic race Liège–Bastogne–Liège. Aru started the Tour sharing leadership of the team with the Dauphiné winner Fuglsang. Aru won the Italian National Road Race Championships a week before the Tour and placed fifth at the Dauphiné.

The sprinters considered favourites for the points classification and wins on the flat or hilly bunch sprint finishes were Peter Sagan (Bora–Hansgrohe), Marcel Kittel (Quick-Step Floors), Mark Cavendish (Team Dimension Data), André Greipel (Lotto–Soudal), and Alexander Kristoff (Team Katusha–Alpecin). Others expected to contend for sprint finishes included Michael Matthews (Team Sunweb), Arnaud Démare (FDJ), Dylan Groenewegen (LottoNL–Jumbo), John Degenkolb (Trek–Segafredo), Sonny Colbrelli (UAE Team Emirates) and Nacer Bouhanni (Cofidis). Double reigning world road race champion Sagan had won the five previous points classifications of the Tour, one away from matching Erik Zabel's record of six from 1996 to 2001. His form in the 2017 season before the Tour included winning the one-day Kuurne–Brussels–Kuurne race and the points classifications in Tirreno–Adriatico, the Tour de Suisse and the Tour of California. Kittel had gained eight wins so far in 2017, as well as the general and points classifications in the Dubai Tour at the start of the season. Cavendish's season before the Tour was affected by glandular fever, missing around three months; his only success had been a stage win and the points classification at the Abu Dhabi Tour. Greipel had amassed four wins in 2017 before the Tour, including one at the Giro. Kristoff had taken six wins so far in 2017, and the points classifications at the Tour of Oman, the Étoile de Bessèges and the Three Days of De Panne.

== Route and stages ==
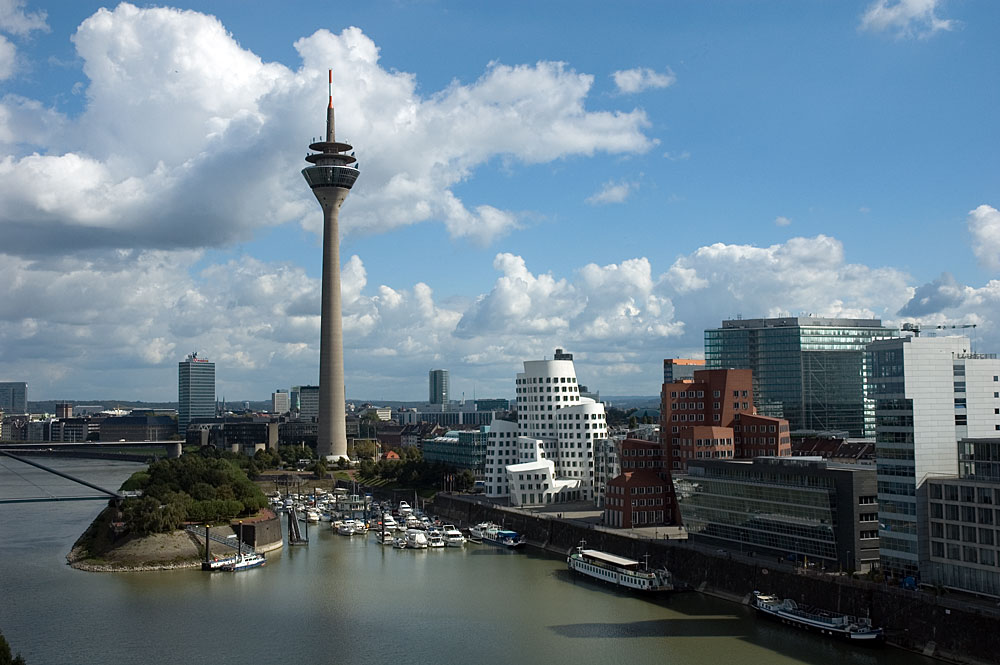
Düsseldorf hosted the Grand Départ of the race, the fourth time the Tour de France had started in Germany.

The opening stages of the 2017 Tour (known as the Grand Départ) were originally scheduled to be in London, United Kingdom; this would have been the third time the Tour had visited London, following the 2007 and 2014 editions. In September 2015, a week before this was due to be announced, Transport for London pulled out of the bid. It was later revealed that this was the decision of the then Mayor of London, Boris Johnson, on the grounds of cost: hosting the Grand Depart would have cost £35 million. In December 2015, the ASO announced that the Grand Départ would take place with stages based in Düsseldorf, the fourth time the Tour had begun in Germany and the first since 1987. The bid to host the Tour was only narrowly approved by the city council. The return to Germany followed a resurgence in German professional cycling. On 14 January 2016, details of the opening two stages were announced. The first stage would be a 13-kilometre (8.1 mi) individual time trial in Düsseldorf itself. The second stage would also begin in Düsseldorf. The full route was announced by race director Christian Prudhomme on 18 October 2016 at the Palais des Congrès in Paris.

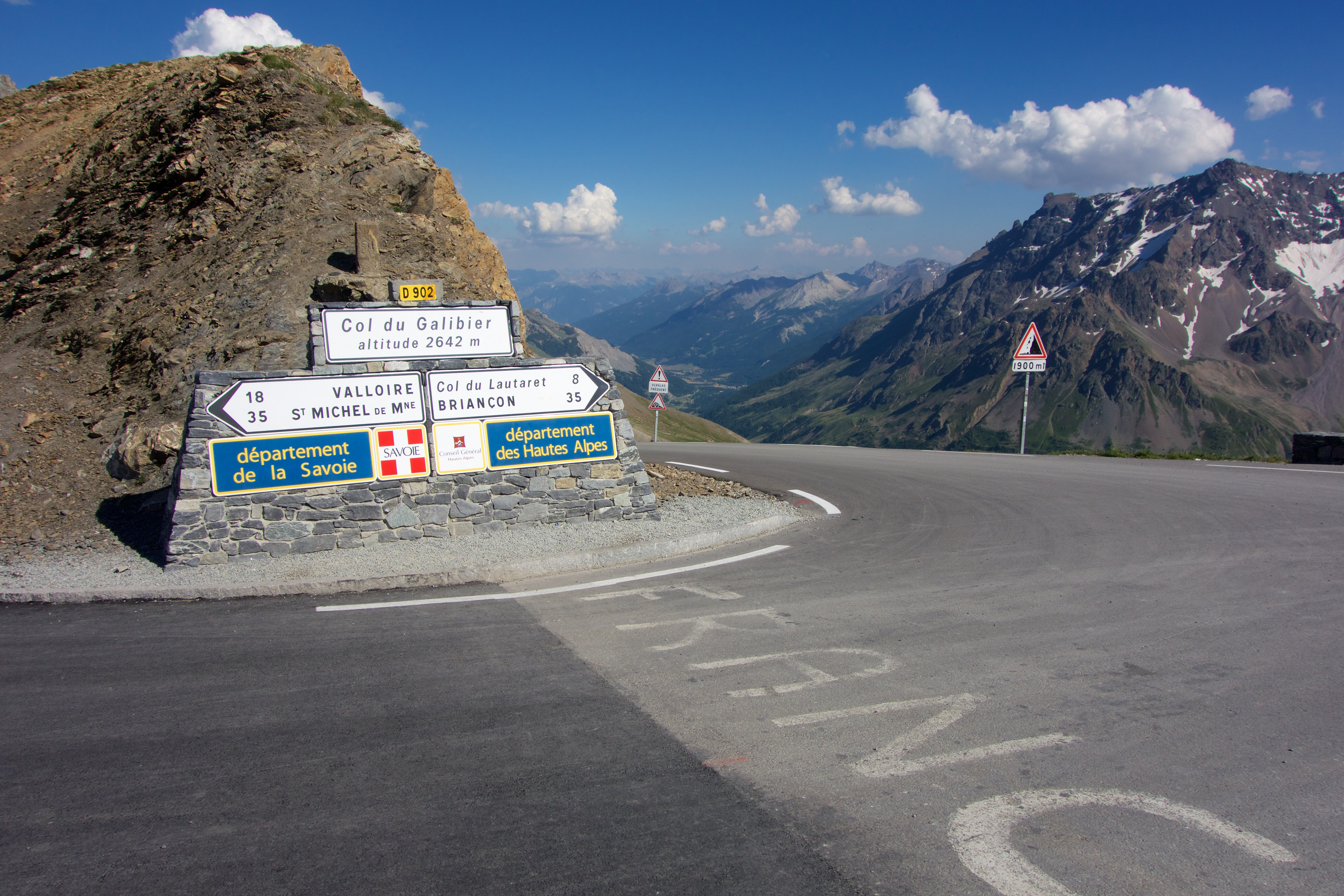
The highest point of elevation in the race was the Col du Galibier Alpine pass, at 2,642 m (8,668 ft); the Souvenir Henri Desgrange prize was awarded to the first rider that reached it.

After the first time trial, the race left Germany during stage two, which finished in the Belgian city of Liège. Stage three headed south, and after a brief passage through Luxembourg, ended with a climb in Longwy. After a transitional stage, stage five saw the first major climb, the finish at the La Planche des Belles Filles. The next two stages headed south-west, before stage eight in the Jura Mountains, featured three categorised climbs. The ninth stage included the steep climbs of the Col de la Biche, the Col du Grand Colombier, and, after a 42-year absence, the Signal du Mont du Chat, its summit 25 km (15.5 mi) from the finish in Chambéry. After a transfer during the rest day, stage ten took place in the Dordogne region, between Périgueux and Bergerac. Stage eleven was a transitional stage, followed by two stages in the Pyrenees. Stage twelve started from Pau and ended at the Peyragudes ski resort. The next stage was short, at 110 km (68 mi), but included three climbs before a descent finish into Foix. After leaving the Pyrenees, the riders headed north-east; stage fourteen finished with a climb towards the end of the stage. Stage fifteen featured the first appearance of the Col de Peyra Taillade, with its conclusion in Le Puy-en-Velay. Stage sixteen, the first after the final rest day, was a transitional stage, heading east, towards the Alps. Stage seventeen included the Col d'Ornon, the Col de la Croix de Fer, the Col du Télégraphe and the highest point of elevation in the race, the Col du Galibier, before a descent finish into Serre Chevalier. Stage eighteen was the final day of mountains; it had two climbs, the Col de Vars and the finishing climb, the Col d'Izoard. It was the first time the Tour finished on the 2,360 m (7,743 ft)-high mountain pass. After another transitional stage, heading south, came stage twenty, a 23 km (14.3 mi) individual time trial in Marseille. Starting at the Stade Vélodrome, the course headed around the city, designated the 2017 European Capital of Sport, before ending also at the Stade Vélodrome. The final stage began in Montgeron, which hosted the start of the first Tour, before concluding with the traditional laps of the Champs-Élysées.

There were 21 stages in the race, covering a total distance of 3,540 km (2,200 mi), 13 km (8.1 mi) shorter than the 2016 Tour. There were two time trial events, both of which were individual, a total of 36 km (22.4 mi). Of the remaining nineteen stages, eight were officially classified as flat, six as medium mountain and five as high mountain. The longest mass-start stage was stage nineteen, at 222.5 km (138 mi), and the shortest was stage thirteen, at 101 km (63 mi). For the first time since the 1992 edition, the route included all five of mainland France's mountainous regions; the Vosges, the Jura, the Pyrenees, the Massif Central and the Alps. There were summit finishes on stage twelve to Peyragudes and stage eighteen to the Col d'Izoard. Additionally, the hilly stage three had a hilltop finish in Longwy, and stage five ended at La Planche des Belles Filles. The highest point of the race was the 2,642 m (8,668 ft)-high Col du Galibier mountain pass on stage seventeen. It was among seven hors catégorie (English: "out of category") rated climbs in the race. There were ten new start or finish locations. The rest days were after stage nine, in the Dordogne, and fifteen, in Le Puy-en-Velay.

Stage characteristics and winners
Stage	Date	Course	Distance	Type	Winner
1	1 July	Düsseldorf (Germany)	14 km (9 mi)	Individual time trial	Geraint Thomas (GBR)
2	2 July	Düsseldorf (Germany) to Liège (Belgium)	203.5 km (126 mi)	Flat stage	Marcel Kittel (GER)
3	3 July	Verviers (Belgium) to Longwy	212.5 km (132 mi)	Medium mountain stage	Peter Sagan (SVK)
4	4 July	Mondorf-les-Bains (Luxembourg) to Vittel	207.5 km (129 mi)	Flat stage	Arnaud Démare (FRA)
5	5 July	Vittel to La Planche des Belles Filles	160.5 km (100 mi)	Medium mountain stage	Fabio Aru (ITA)
6	6 July	Vesoul to Troyes	216 km (134 mi)	Flat stage	Marcel Kittel (GER)
7	7 July	Troyes to Nuits-Saint-Georges	213.5 km (133 mi)	Flat stage	Marcel Kittel (GER)
8	8 July	Dole to Station des Rousses	187.5 km (117 mi)	Medium mountain stage	Lilian Calmejane (FRA)
9	9 July	Nantua to Chambéry	181.5 km (113 mi)	High mountain stage	Rigoberto Urán (COL)
	10 July	Dordogne		Rest day	
10	11 July	Périgueux to Bergerac	178 km (111 mi)	Flat stage	Marcel Kittel (GER)
11	12 July	Eymet to Pau	203.5 km (126 mi)	Flat stage	Marcel Kittel (GER)
12	13 July	Pau to Peyragudes	214.5 km (133 mi)	High mountain stage	Romain Bardet (FRA)
13	14 July	Saint-Girons to Foix	101 km (63 mi)	High mountain stage	Warren Barguil (FRA)
14	15 July	Blagnac to Rodez	181.5 km (113 mi)	Medium mountain stage	Michael Matthews (AUS)
15	16 July	Laissac-Sévérac-l'Église to Le Puy-en-Velay	189.5 km (118 mi)	Medium mountain stage	Bauke Mollema (NED)
	17 July	Le Puy-en-Velay		Rest day	
16	18 July	Le Puy-en-Velay to Romans-sur-Isère	165 km (103 mi)	Medium mountain stage	Michael Matthews (AUS)
17	19 July	La Mure to Serre Chevalier	183 km (114 mi)	High mountain stage	Primož Roglič (SLO)
18	20 July	Briançon to Col d'Izoard	179.5 km (112 mi)	High mountain stage	Warren Barguil (FRA)
19	21 July	Embrun to Salon-de-Provence	222.5 km (138 mi)	Flat stage	Edvald Boasson Hagen (NOR)
20	22 July	Marseille	22.5 km (14 mi)	Individual time trial	Maciej Bodnar (POL)
21	23 July	Montgeron to Paris (Champs-Élysées)	103 km (64 mi)	Flat stage	Dylan Groenewegen (NED)
	Total		3,540 km (2,200 mi)		

== Race overview ==
=== Opening stages, Vosges and Jura ===
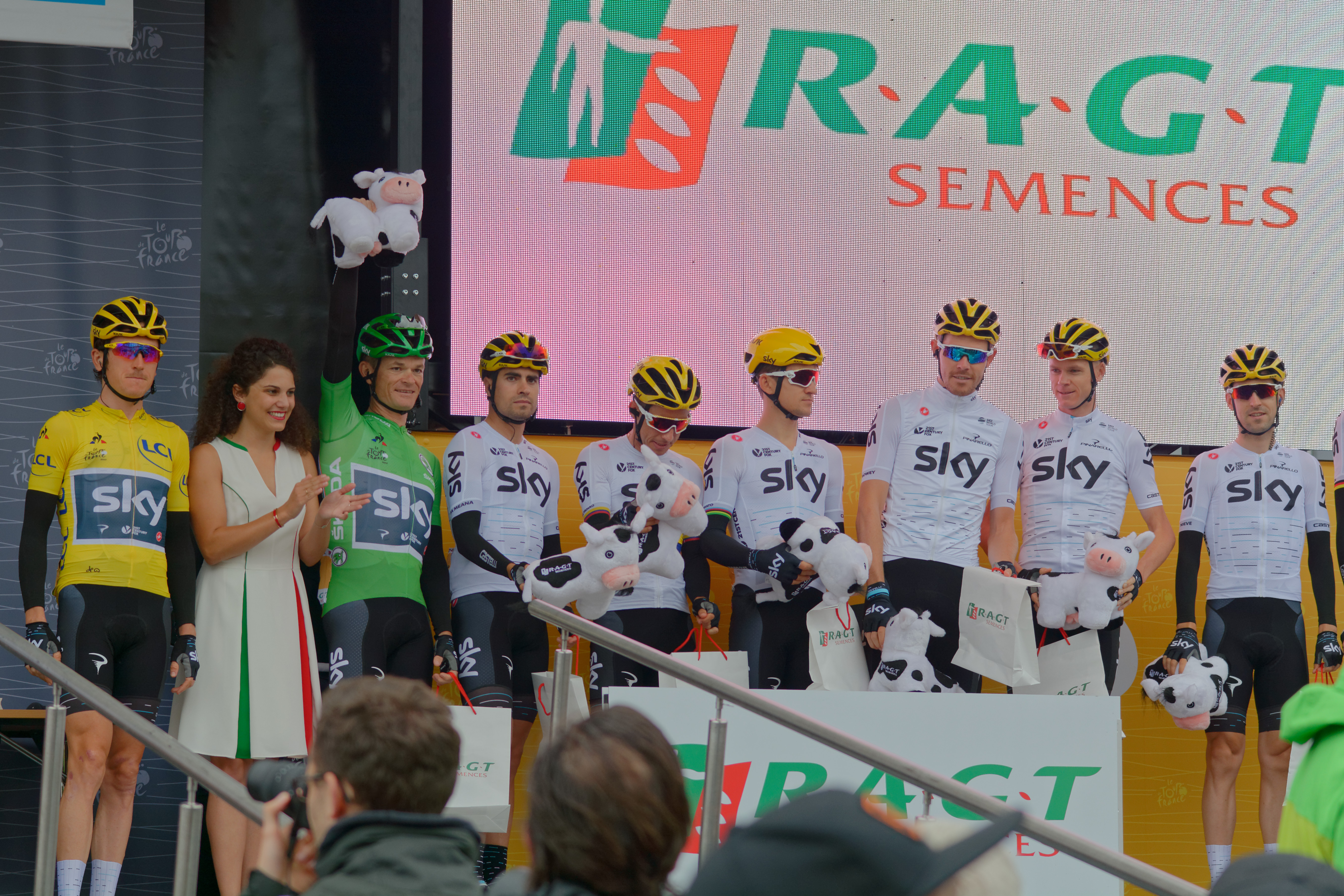
Team Sky (pictured before stage two) took the initial lead of the team classification after having the three highest place riders from a team in stage one's individual time trial, including stage winner Geraint Thomas, who took the race leader's yellow jersey. (Note: In stage two, Vasil Kiryienka, who was third in the points classification, wore the green jersey, because Geraint Thomas wore the yellow jersey as leader of the general classification. Stefan Küng, who was second in the points classification, wore the white jersey as leader of the young rider classification.)

The opening stage's individual time trial was won by Geraint Thomas with a time of 16 min 4 s over the 14 km (8.7 mi) course. Thomas took the yellow and green jerseys as the leader of the general and points classifications respectively. Chris Froome was the highest placed of the general classification favourites, in sixth place, sixteen seconds down. Overall contender Alejandro Valverde crashed on the wet roads and his injuries forced him to withdraw from the Tour. Marcel Kittel won stage two's bunch sprint, and with it the green jersey. Breakaway rider Taylor Phinney (Cannondale–Drapac) took the first polka dot jersey as the leader of the mountains classification. The uphill sprint finish of stage three was won by Peter Sagan; Nathan Brown (Cannondale–Drapac) took over the polka dot jersey. The fourth stage ended with a bunch sprint and was won by Démare, with him also taking the green jersey. There were two crashes leading up to the finish, the first was in the peloton around 1 km (0.6 mi) left and the second involved the sprinters at the end. In the sprint finish, Mark Cavendish crashed into the barriers at the side of the road, withdrawing later that day from the race from his injuries. Sagan, second in the stage, was disqualified after race officials judged that he caused Cavendish to crash, with the jury president Philippe Marien saying that he "endangered some of his colleagues seriously". The near universal opinion among commentators and former riders was that a disqualification is not justified and even senseless. André Greipel, who had criticised Sagan right after the stage, also exonerated him after watching the replays. In December 2017, Sagan was officially exonerated by cycling's governing body, the Union Cycliste Internationale (UCI).

In the fifth stage, a group containing the overall contenders caught the last of the breakaway riders 5 km (3.1 mi) from the summit finish at the La Planche des Belles Filles. With 2.4 km (1.5 mi) remaining, Fabio Aru attacked and won with a margin of sixteen seconds over the group. Thomas lost twenty seconds on the group and lost the yellow jersey to teammate Froome. Aru took over the lead of the mountains classification. Kittel won the following two stages which ended in bunch sprints. The latter stage was decided by a photo finish, with Kittel 6 mm (0.2 in) ahead of Edvald Boasson Hagen (Team Dimension Data); Kittel regained the green jersey. In stage eight, the first high mountain stage, Lilian Calmejane of Direct Énergie attacked over the category 1 climb of Montée de la Combe de Laisia Les Molunes from a six-strong lead breakaway and soloed for 11.5 km (7.1 mi) to take the win 37 seconds ahead of second-placed and lone chaser Robert Gesink (LottoNL–Jumbo). Calmejane put himself into the polka dot jersey. The ninth stage saw a select group of general classification favourites join Warren Barguil (Team Sunweb) after the final climb of the Mont du Chat and contest a sprint finish, won by Rigoberto Urán (Cannondale–Drapac). Barguil took lead of the mountains classification. Upon crossing the finish line Barguil thought he won the stage while Uran showed no visible reaction. After a few moments to review the photo finish it was revealed that Uran's 'bike throw' got him over the line first to claim the stage win as Froome sprinted hard to earn a stage podium, but more importantly four bonus seconds to extend his overall lead. Richie Porte crashed heavily taking down Dan Martin while descending the Mont du Chat within the group of overall contenders. Porte withdrew from the race and was rushed to the hospital; fortunately he was in a stable condition. Dan Martin recovered and finished strongly. The following day was the Tour's first rest day.

=== Pyrenees and Massif Central ===
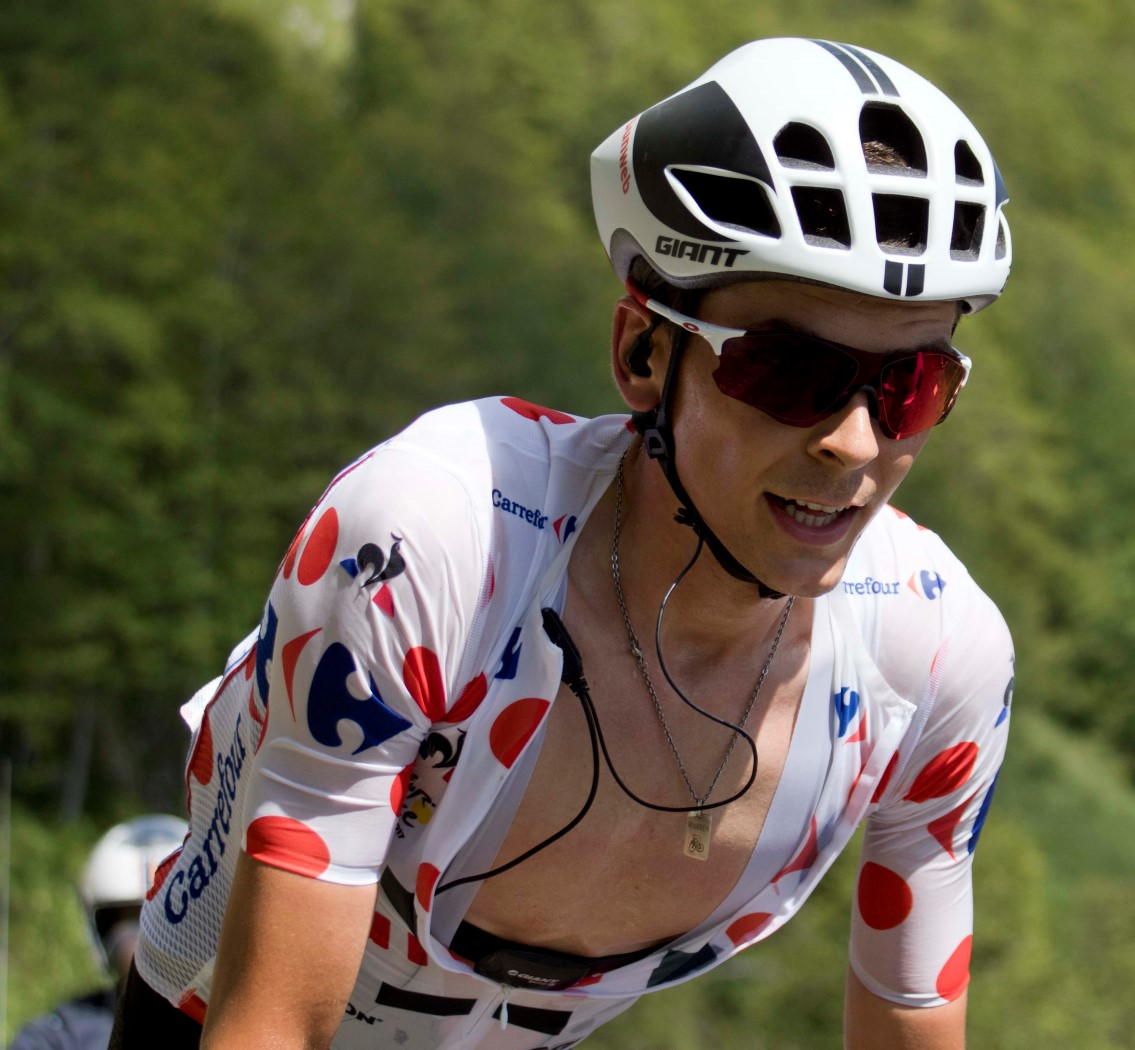
Team Sunweb rider Warren Barguil on stage thirteen, one of the two high mountain stages he won on the way to winning the mountains classification's polka dot jersey

Stages ten and eleven were won from bunch sprints by Kittel, taking his total of wins at the race to five. The twelfth stage saw the overall contenders all reach the foot of the short steep climb to Peyragudes; Romain Bardet won by a margin of two seconds. Froome came seventh, 22 seconds down, and lost the overall lead to third-placed Aru. The 101 km (62.8 mi)-long stage thirteen was won by Barguil, who won the sprint after a descent from an elite group with Nairo Quintana, Alberto Contador and Mikel Landa (Team Sky). The chasing group of overall contenders came in 1 min 39 s down. In the fourteenth stage, a reduced peloton contested the uphill sprint finish at Rodez, which was won by Matthews. Aru's advantage of six seconds over Froome was changed to a deficit of eighteen, after Aru came in thirty seconds down in thirtieth place and Froome was seventh, one second behind Matthews.

Stage fifteen saw Trek–Segafredo's Bauke Mollema attack a breakaway group over the top of the Col de Peyra Taillade with 31 km (19.3 mi) to go and solo to victory. In the large group containing the overall contenders, Bardet's team AG2R La Mondiale forced a high pace on the Peyra Taillade. A further 6 km (3.7 mi) later on the climb, Froome suffered a broken spoke, and, after receiving a new wheel from a teammate and some assistance from three other teammates, he was able to chase back up to the group. The next day was the second rest day of the race. In the sixteenth stage, the high pace set by Matthews's Team Sunweb dropped the green jersey wearer Kittel; Matthews, who was second to Kittel in points classification, won the stage. Primož Roglič (LottoNL–Jumbo), second behind Barguil in the mountains classification, won the following mountainous stage after a solo attack on the Col du Galibier, finishing in Serre Chevalier after a descent over a minute ahead of a four-man group containing the new top three in the general classification: Froome, Urán, and Bardet, respectively; and also Barguil. Aru dropped from second overall to fourth. Kittel crashed and withdrew from the Tour, putting Matthews in the green jersey.

=== Alps and finale ===
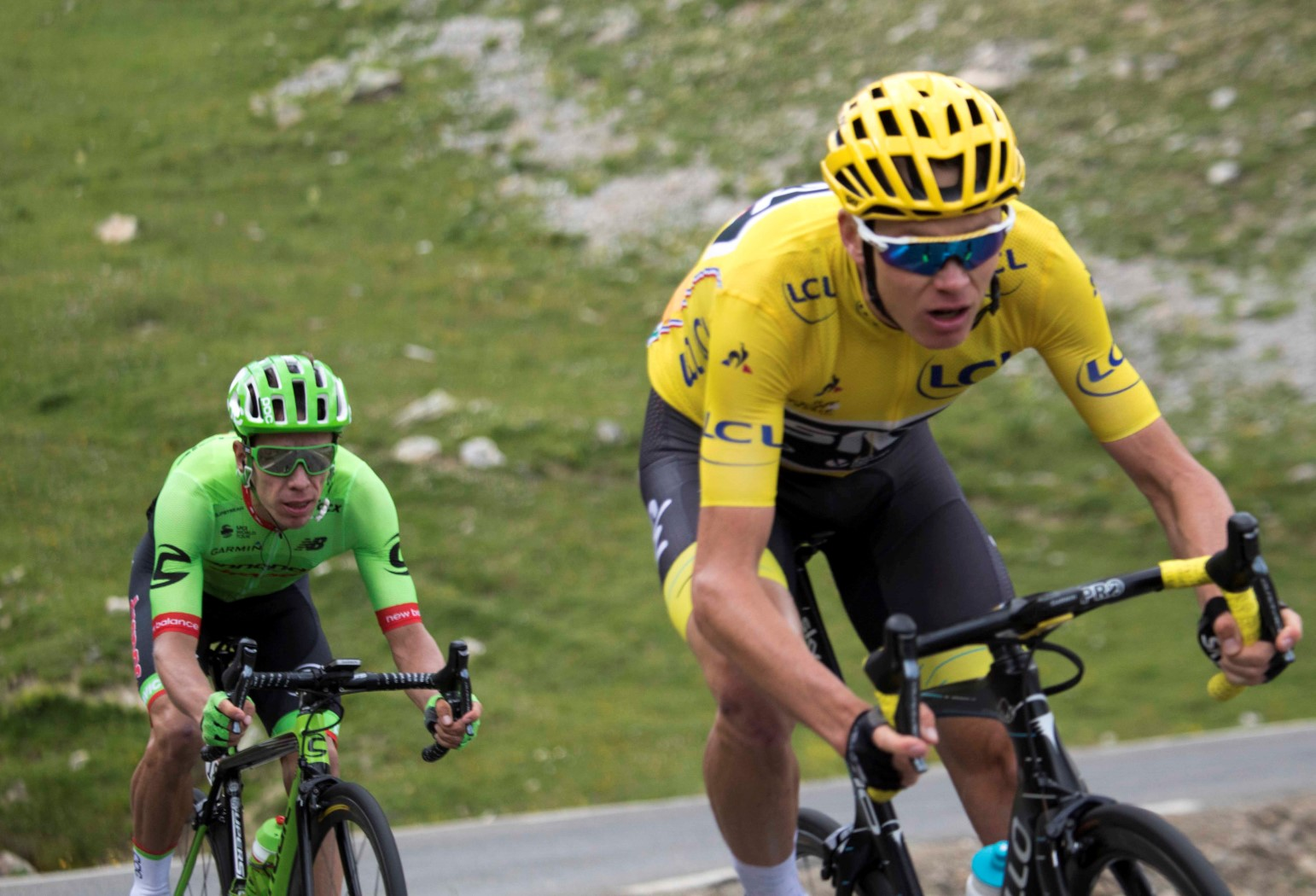
Chris Froome (right) and Rigoberto Urán (left) (pictured on stage seventeen) finished the Tour in first and second, respectively, in the general classification.

The final high mountain stage of the Tour, the eighteenth, saw Barguil claim his second stage victory of the race on the summit finish at Col d'Izoard; he was initially caught by the group of overall favourites on the final climb after being the one of last survivors from the breakaway, with only Darwin Atapuma (UAE Team Emirates) ahead. Barguil's winning move came with 3 km (1.9 mi) remaining, passing Atapuma to win by twenty seconds. A three-way sprint for fourth place saw Bardet finish just ahead of Froome with Urán placing fifth; Bardet moved up to second overall, six seconds ahead of Urán, with Froome holding a 23-second advantage. Boasson Hagen won stage nineteen with an attack from a reduced breakaway with 2.5 km (1.6 mi) to go. Maciej Bodnar of Bora–Hansgrohe won the 22.5 km (14.0 mi) individual time trial of the penultimate stage, setting a time of 28 min 15 s. Froome was third, six seconds down, increasing his lead in the general classification to 54 seconds. Bardet dropped to third overall after he lost over two minutes in the stage, and Urán was 31 seconds in arrears.

The final stage in Paris was won by Dylan Groenewegen in a bunch sprint on the Champs-Élysées. Froome finished the race to win his fourth Tour de France. Urán placed second overall, 54 seconds down, with Bardet 2 min 20 s behind, just one second ahead of Landa (fourth overall). Matthews won the points classification with a total of 370, 136 ahead of Greipel in second. Barguil won the mountains classification with 169 points, 89 ahead of second-placed Roglič. The best young rider was seventh-placed overall Simon Yates, who was followed by Louis Meintjes (eighth overall) in second, 2 min 6 s down. An Orica–Scott rider won the classification for the second consecutive year, after Yates' twin brother Adam won in 2016. Team Sky finished as the winners of the team classification, 7 min 14 s ahead of second-placed AG2R La Mondiale. Of the 198 starters, 167 reached the finish of the last stage in Paris.

== Classification leadership and minor prizes ==
There were four main individual classifications being contested in the 2017 Tour de France, as well as a team competition. The most important was the general classification, which was calculated by adding each rider's finishing times on each stage. Time bonuses (time subtracted) were awarded at the end of every stage apart from the two individual time trials. The first three riders get 10, 6, and 4 seconds, respectively. For crashes within the final 3 km (1.9 mi) of a stage, not including time trials and summit finishes, any rider involved received the same time as the group they were in when the crash occurred. The rider with the lowest cumulative time was the winner of the general classification and was considered to be the overall winner of the Tour. The rider leading the classification wore a yellow jersey.

Points classification points for the top 15 positions by type
Type	1	2	3	4	5	6	7	8	9	10	11	12	13	14	15
Flat stage	50	30	20	18	16	14	12	10	8	7	6	5	4	3	2
Medium mountain stage	30	25	22	19	17	15	13	11	9	7	6	5	4	3	2
High mountain stage	20	17	15	13	11	10	9	8	7	6	5	4	3	2	1
Individual time trial	20	17	15	13	11	10	9	8	7	6	5	4	3	2	1
Intermediate sprint	20	17	15	13	11	10	9	8	7	6	5	4	3	2	1

The second classification was the points classification. Riders received points for finishing among the highest placed in a stage finish, or in intermediate sprints during the stage. The points available for each stage finish were determined by the stage's type. The leader was identified by a green jersey.

The third classification was the mountains classification. Points were awarded to the riders that reached the summit of the most difficult climbs first. The climbs were categorised, in order of increasing difficulty, as fourth-, third-, second-, and first-category and hors catégorie. Double points were awarded on the summit finish of the Col d'Izoard on stage 18. The leader wore a white jersey with red polka dots.

The final individual classification was the young rider classification. This was calculated the same way as the general classification, but the classification was restricted to riders who were born on or after 1 January 1992. The leader wore a white jersey.

The final classification was a team classification. This was calculated using the finishing times of the best three riders per team on each stage; the leading team was the team with the lowest cumulative time. The number of stage victories and placings per team determined the outcome of a tie. The riders in the team that led this classification were identified with yellow number bibs on the back of their jerseys and yellow helmets.

In addition, there was a combativity award given after each stage to the rider considered, by a jury, to have "made the greatest effort and who demonstrated the best qualities of sportsmanship". No combativity awards were given for the time trials and the final stage. The winner wore a red number bib the following stage. At the conclusion of the Tour, Warren Barguil won the overall super-combativity award, again, decided by a jury.

A total of €2,280,950 was awarded in cash prizes in the race. The overall winner of the general classification received €500,000, with the second and third placed riders getting €200,000 and €100,000 respectively. All finishers in the top 160 were awarded with money. The holders of the classifications benefited on each stage they led; the final winners of the points and mountains were given €25,000, while the best young rider and most combative rider collected €20,000. The team classification winners were given €50,000. €11,000 was given to the winners of each stage of the race, with smaller amounts given to places 2–20. There was also a special award with a prize of €5,000, the Souvenir Henri Desgrange, given in honour of Tour founder Henri Desgrange to the first rider to pass the summit of the Col du Galibier. This prize was won by Primož Roglič on stage seventeen.

Classification leadership by stage
Stage	Winner	General classification	Points classification	Mountains classification	Young rider classification	Team classification	Combativity award
1	Geraint Thomas	Geraint Thomas	Geraint Thomas	no award	Stefan Küng	Team Sky	no award
2	Marcel Kittel	Geraint Thomas	Marcel Kittel	Taylor Phinney	Stefan Küng	Team Sky	Yoann Offredo
3	Peter Sagan	Geraint Thomas	Marcel Kittel	Nathan Brown	Pierre Latour	Team Sky	Lilian Calmejane
4	Arnaud Démare	Geraint Thomas	Arnaud Démare	Nathan Brown	Pierre Latour	Team Sky	Guillaume Van Keirsbulck
5	Fabio Aru	Chris Froome	Arnaud Démare	Fabio Aru	Simon Yates	Team Sky	Philippe Gilbert
6	Marcel Kittel	Chris Froome	Arnaud Démare	Fabio Aru	Simon Yates	Team Sky	Vegard Stake Laengen
7	Marcel Kittel	Chris Froome	Marcel Kittel	Fabio Aru	Simon Yates	Team Sky	Dylan van Baarle
8	Lilian Calmejane	Chris Froome	Marcel Kittel	Lilian Calmejane	Simon Yates	Team Sky	Lilian Calmejane
9	Rigoberto Urán	Chris Froome	Marcel Kittel	Warren Barguil	Simon Yates	Team Sky	Warren Barguil
10	Marcel Kittel	Chris Froome	Marcel Kittel	Warren Barguil	Simon Yates	Team Sky	Élie Gesbert
11	Marcel Kittel	Chris Froome	Marcel Kittel	Warren Barguil	Simon Yates	Team Sky	Maciej Bodnar
12	Romain Bardet	Fabio Aru	Marcel Kittel	Warren Barguil	Simon Yates	Team Sky	Steve Cummings
13	Warren Barguil	Fabio Aru	Marcel Kittel	Warren Barguil	Simon Yates	Team Sky	Alberto Contador
14	Michael Matthews	Chris Froome	Marcel Kittel	Warren Barguil	Simon Yates	Team Sky	Thomas De Gendt
15	Bauke Mollema	Chris Froome	Marcel Kittel	Warren Barguil	Simon Yates	Team Sky	Bauke Mollema
16	Michael Matthews	Chris Froome	Marcel Kittel	Warren Barguil	Simon Yates	Team Sky	Sylvain Chavanel
17	Primož Roglič	Chris Froome	Michael Matthews	Warren Barguil	Simon Yates	Team Sky	Alberto Contador
18	Warren Barguil	Chris Froome	Michael Matthews	Warren Barguil	Simon Yates	Team Sky	Darwin Atapuma
19	Edvald Boasson Hagen	Chris Froome	Michael Matthews	Warren Barguil	Simon Yates	Team Sky	Jens Keukeleire
20	Maciej Bodnar	Chris Froome	Michael Matthews	Warren Barguil	Simon Yates	Team Sky	no award
21	Dylan Groenewegen	Chris Froome	Michael Matthews	Warren Barguil	Simon Yates	Team Sky	no award
Final		Chris Froome	Michael Matthews	Warren Barguil	Simon Yates	Team Sky	Warren Barguil

== Final standings ==
Legend
A yellow jersey.	Denotes the winner of the general classification	A white jersey with red polka dots.	Denotes the winner of the mountains classification
A green jersey.	Denotes the winner of the points classification	A white jersey.	Denotes the winner of the young rider classification
A white jersey with a yellow number bib.	Denotes the winner of the team classification	A white jersey with a red number bib.	Denotes the winner of the combativity award

=== General classification ===
Final general classification (1–10)
Rank	Rider	Team	Time
1	Chris Froome (GBR)	Team Sky	86h 20' 55"
2	Rigoberto Urán (COL)	Cannondale–Drapac	+ 54"
3	Romain Bardet (FRA)	AG2R La Mondiale	+ 2' 20"
4	Mikel Landa (ESP)	Team Sky	+ 2' 21"
5	Fabio Aru (ITA)	Astana	+ 3' 05"
6	Dan Martin (IRL)	Quick-Step Floors	+ 4' 42"
7	Simon Yates (GBR)	Orica–Scott	+ 6' 14"
8	Louis Meintjes (RSA)	UAE Team Emirates	+ 8' 20"
9	Alberto Contador (ESP)	Trek–Segafredo	+ 8' 49"
10	Warren Barguil (FRA)	Team Sunweb	+ 9' 25"

Final general classification (11–167)
Rank	Rider	Team	Time
11	Damiano Caruso (ITA)	BMC Racing Team	+ 14' 48"
12	Nairo Quintana (COL)	Movistar Team	+ 15' 28"
13	Alexis Vuillermoz (FRA)	AG2R La Mondiale	+ 24' 38"
14	Mikel Nieve (ESP)	Team Sky	+ 25' 28"
15	Emanuel Buchmann (GER)	Bora–Hansgrohe	+ 33' 21"
16	Brice Feillu (FRA)	Fortuneo–Oscaro	+ 36' 46"
17	Bauke Mollema (NED)	Trek–Segafredo	+ 37' 43"
18	Carlos Betancur (COL)	Movistar Team	+ 37' 47"
19	Serge Pauwels (BEL)	Team Dimension Data	+ 39' 36"
20	Tiesj Benoot (BEL)	Lotto–Soudal	+ 42' 04"
21	Tony Gallopin (FRA)	Lotto–Soudal	+ 42' 39"
22	Jan Bakelants (BEL)	AG2R La Mondiale	+ 50' 04"
23	Guillaume Martin (FRA)	Wanty–Groupe Gobert	+ 53' 52"
24	Roman Kreuziger (CZE)	Orica–Scott	+ 59' 58"
25	Sylvain Chavanel (FRA)	Direct Énergie	+ 1h 04' 22"
26	Romain Hardy (FRA)	Fortuneo–Oscaro	+ 1h 12' 51"
27	Daniel Navarro (ESP)	Cofidis	+ 1h 15' 26"
28	Sergio Henao (COL)	Team Sky	+ 1h 16' 32"
29	Pierre Latour (FRA)	AG2R La Mondiale	+ 1h 18' 45"
30	Mathias Frank (SUI)	AG2R La Mondiale	+ 1h 21' 16"
31	Robert Kišerlovski (CRO)	Team Katusha–Alpecin	+ 1h 25' 25"
32	Amaël Moinard (FRA)	BMC Racing Team	+ 1h 32' 02"
33	Nicolas Roche (IRL)	BMC Racing Team	+ 1h 32' 35"
34	Thomas Degand (BEL)	Wanty–Groupe Gobert	+ 1h 34' 02"
35	Lilian Calmejane (FRA)	Direct Énergie	+ 1h 35' 16"
36	Rudy Molard (FRA)	FDJ	+ 1h 35' 55"
37	Ben Gastauer (LUX)	AG2R La Mondiale	+ 1h 38' 33"
38	Primož Roglič (SLO)	LottoNL–Jumbo	+ 1h 44' 41"
39	Diego Ulissi (ITA)	UAE Team Emirates	+ 1h 45' 23"
40	Marco Minnaard (NED)	Wanty–Groupe Gobert	+ 1h 48' 11"
41	Darwin Atapuma (COL)	UAE Team Emirates	+ 1h 50' 31"
42	Pierre-Luc Périchon (FRA)	Fortuneo–Oscaro	+ 1h 57' 29"
43	Nathan Brown (USA)	Cannondale–Drapac	+ 1h 57' 52"
44	Andrey Zeits (KAZ)	Astana	+ 1h 59' 09"
45	Janez Brajkovič (SLO)	Bahrain–Merida	+ 2h 00' 38"
46	Jarlinson Pantano (COL)	Trek–Segafredo	+ 2h 01' 30"
47	Daryl Impey (RSA)	Orica–Scott	+ 2h 01' 59"
48	Cyril Gautier (FRA)	AG2R La Mondiale	+ 2h 03' 24"
49	Andrew Talansky (USA)	Cannondale–Drapac	+ 2h 03' 27"
50	Kristijan Đurasek (CRO)	UAE Team Emirates	+ 2h 04' 53"
51	Thomas De Gendt (BEL)	Lotto–Soudal	+ 2h 05' 36"
52	Haimar Zubeldia (ESP)	Trek–Segafredo	+ 2h 06' 30"
53	Gianluca Brambilla (ITA)	Quick-Step Floors	+ 2h 06' 57"
54	Pierre Rolland (FRA)	Cannondale–Drapac	+ 2h 11' 54"
55	Maxime Bouet (FRA)	Fortuneo–Oscaro	+ 2h 13' 23"
56	Luis Ángel Maté (ESP)	Cofidis	+ 2h 15' 28"
57	Michał Kwiatkowski (POL)	Team Sky	+ 2h 17' 48"
58	Greg Van Avermaet (BEL)	BMC Racing Team	+ 2h 19' 14"
59	Jens Keukeleire (BEL)	Orica–Scott	+ 2h 22' 26"
60	Jonathan Castroviejo (ESP)	Movistar Team	+ 2h 22' 44"
61	Michael Valgren (DEN)	Astana	+ 2h 25' 36"
62	Esteban Chaves (COL)	Orica–Scott	+ 2h 27' 34"
63	Oliver Naesen (BEL)	AG2R La Mondiale	+ 2h 28' 02"
64	Simon Geschke (GER)	Team Sunweb	+ 2h 28' 57"
65	Eduardo Sepúlveda (ARG)	Fortuneo–Oscaro	+ 2h 31' 05"
66	Romain Sicard (FRA)	Direct Énergie	+ 2h 33' 24"
67	Laurens ten Dam (NED)	Team Sunweb	+ 2h 34' 56"
68	Axel Domont (FRA)	AG2R La Mondiale	+ 2h 35' 33"
69	Michael Matthews (AUS)	Team Sunweb	+ 2h 36' 36"
70	Koen de Kort (NED)	Trek–Segafredo	+ 2h 38' 33"
71	Alexey Lutsenko (KAZ)	Astana	+ 2h 39' 10"
72	Michael Schär (SUI)	BMC Racing Team	+ 2h 41' 54"
73	Tsgabu Grmay (ETH)	Bahrain–Merida	+ 2h 42' 15"
74	Tiago Machado (POR)	Team Katusha–Alpecin	+ 2h 43' 36"
75	Maurits Lammertink (NED)	Team Katusha–Alpecin	+ 2h 44' 01"
76	Nicolas Edet (FRA)	Cofidis	+ 2h 45' 11"
77	Dylan van Baarle (NED)	Cannondale–Drapac	+ 2h 47' 11"
78	Edvald Boasson Hagen (NOR)	Team Dimension Data	+ 2h 48' 12"
79	Stefan Küng (SUI)	BMC Racing Team	+ 2h 49' 17"
80	Paweł Poljański (POL)	Bora–Hansgrohe	+ 2h 53' 42"
81	Danilo Wyss (SUI)	BMC Racing Team	+ 2h 53' 51"
82	Paul Martens (GER)	LottoNL–Jumbo	+ 2h 54' 14"
83	Ben Swift (GBR)	UAE Team Emirates	+ 2h 54' 48"
84	Nikias Arndt (GER)	Team Sunweb	+ 2h 54' 54"
85	Élie Gesbert (FRA)	Fortuneo–Oscaro	+ 2h 55' 13"
86	Simon Clarke (AUS)	Cannondale–Drapac	+ 2h 55' 27"
87	Andrey Amador (CRC)	Movistar Team	+ 2h 56' 43"
88	Damien Howson (AUS)	Orica–Scott	+ 2h 56' 57"
89	Angelo Tulik (FRA)	Direct Énergie	+ 2h 57' 05"
90	Alberto Bettiol (ITA)	Cannondale–Drapac	+ 2h 57' 56"
91	Thomas Voeckler (FRA)	Direct Énergie	+ 2h 58' 51"
92	Imanol Erviti (ESP)	Movistar Team	+ 3h 00' 21"
93	Bakhtiyar Kozhatayev (KAZ)	Astana	+ 3h 04' 11"
94	Jay McCarthy (AUS)	Bora–Hansgrohe	+ 3h 05' 13"
95	Nils Politt (GER)	Team Katusha–Alpecin	+ 3h 05' 52"
96	Marco Marcato (ITA)	UAE Team Emirates	+ 3h 05' 53"
97	Jesús Herrada (ESP)	Movistar Team	+ 3h 06' 05"
98	Michael Albasini (SUI)	Orica–Scott	+ 3h 06' 55"
99	Alessandro De Marchi (ITA)	BMC Racing Team	+ 3h 07' 25"
100	Pieter Vanspeybrouck (BEL)	Wanty–Groupe Gobert	+ 3h 09' 38"
101	Tony Martin (GER)	Team Katusha–Alpecin	+ 3h 10' 18"
102	Zdeněk Štybar (CZE)	Quick-Step Floors	+ 3h 12' 12"
103	Florian Vachon (FRA)	Fortuneo–Oscaro	+ 3h 13' 10"
104	Daniele Bennati (ITA)	Movistar Team	+ 3h 13' 44"
105	Jack Bauer (NZL)	Quick-Step Floors	+ 3h 15' 13"
106	Perrig Quéméneur (FRA)	Direct Énergie	+ 3h 15' 40"
107	Scott Thwaites (GBR)	Team Dimension Data	+ 3h 16' 28"
108	Jasha Sütterlin (GER)	Movistar Team	+ 3h 17' 53"
109	Yukiya Arashiro (JPN)	Bahrain–Merida	+ 3h 18' 16"
110	Yoann Offredo (FRA)	Wanty–Groupe Gobert	+ 3h 20' 50"
111	Matteo Bono (ITA)	UAE Team Emirates	+ 3h 20' 59"
112	Vasil Kiryienka (BLR)	Team Sky	+ 3h 21' 15"
113	Adam Hansen (AUS)	Lotto–Soudal	+ 3h 22' 31"
114	Patrick Bevin (NZL)	Cannondale–Drapac	+ 3h 23' 00"
115	Dmitriy Gruzdev (KAZ)	Astana	+ 3h 24' 42"
116	Maciej Bodnar (POL)	Bora–Hansgrohe	+ 3h 26' 58"
117	Julien Simon (FRA)	Cofidis	+ 3h 29' 21"
118	Reinardt Janse van Rensburg (RSA)	Team Dimension Data	+ 3h 30' 54"
119	Javier Moreno (ESP)	Bahrain–Merida	+ 3h 32' 06"
120	Andriy Hrivko (UKR)	Astana	+ 3h 32' 14"
121	John Degenkolb (GER)	Trek–Segafredo	+ 3h 35' 14"
122	Sonny Colbrelli (ITA)	Bahrain–Merida	+ 3h 36' 22"
123	Lars Bak (DEN)	Lotto–Soudal	+ 3h 37' 04"
124	Dion Smith (NZL)	Wanty–Groupe Gobert	+ 3h 39' 24"
125	Laurent Pichon (FRA)	Fortuneo–Oscaro	+ 3h 39' 45"
126	Adrien Petit (FRA)	Direct Énergie	+ 3h 41' 34"
127	Vegard Stake Laengen (NOR)	UAE Team Emirates	+ 3h 41' 52"
128	Cyril Lemoine (FRA)	Cofidis	+ 3h 43' 45"
129	Mike Teunissen (NED)	Team Sunweb	+ 3h 43' 52"
130	Alexander Kristoff (NOR)	Team Katusha–Alpecin	+ 3h 45' 40"
131	Marcus Burghardt (GER)	Bora–Hansgrohe	+ 3h 45' 57"
132	Frederik Backaert (BEL)	Wanty–Groupe Gobert	+ 3h 46' 36"
133	Christophe Laporte (FRA)	Cofidis	+ 3h 46' 47"
134	Yohann Gène (FRA)	Direct Énergie	+ 3h 47' 08"
135	Markel Irizar (ESP)	Trek–Segafredo	+ 3h 47' 10"
136	Jürgen Roelandts (BEL)	Lotto–Soudal	+ 3h 47' 20"
137	Andrea Pasqualon (ITA)	Wanty–Groupe Gobert	+ 3h 51' 18"
138	Nacer Bouhanni (FRA)	Cofidis	+ 3h 51' 29"
139	Julien Vermote (BEL)	Quick-Step Floors	+ 3h 52' 54"
140	Thomas Boudat (FRA)	Direct Énergie	+ 3h 53' 08"
141	Steve Cummings (GBR)	Team Dimension Data	+ 3h 53' 10"
142	Roy Curvers (NED)	Team Sunweb	+ 3h 53' 38"
143	Grega Bole (SLO)	Bahrain–Merida	+ 3h 55' 29"
144	Christian Knees (GER)	Team Sky	+ 3h 55' 31"
145	Rick Zabel (GER)	Team Katusha–Alpecin	+ 3h 55' 48"
146	Michael Gogl (AUT)	Trek–Segafredo	+ 3h 59' 06"
147	Guillaume Van Keirsbulck (BEL)	Wanty–Groupe Gobert	+ 3h 59' 48"
148	Ramon Sinkeldam (NED)	Team Sunweb	+ 4h 01' 54"
149	André Greipel (GER)	Lotto–Soudal	+ 4h 02' 54"
150	Reto Hollenstein (SUI)	Team Katusha–Alpecin	+ 4h 03' 45"
151	Mathew Hayman (AUS)	Orica–Scott	+ 4h 05' 17"
152	Davide Cimolai (ITA)	FDJ	+ 4h 06' 15"
153	Bernhard Eisel (AUT)	Team Dimension Data	+ 4h 10' 18"
154	Fabio Sabatini (ITA)	Quick-Step Floors	+ 4h 10' 25"
155	Marco Haller (AUT)	Team Katusha–Alpecin	+ 4h 13' 50"
156	Dylan Groenewegen (NED)	LottoNL–Jumbo	+ 4h 16' 02"
157	Albert Timmer (NED)	Team Sunweb	+ 4h 16' 21"
158	Olivier Le Gac (FRA)	FDJ	+ 4h 17' 21"
159	Taylor Phinney (USA)	Cannondale–Drapac	+ 4h 18' 15"
160	Borut Božič (SLO)	Bahrain–Merida	+ 4h 18' 41"
161	Florian Sénéchal (FRA)	Cofidis	+ 4h 19' 17"
162	Jaco Venter (RSA)	Team Dimension Data	+ 4h 20' 16"
163	Dimitri Claeys (BEL)	Cofidis	+ 4h 25' 01"
164	Robert Wagner (GER)	LottoNL–Jumbo	+ 4h 25' 12"
165	Rüdiger Selig (GER)	Bora–Hansgrohe	+ 4h 26' 43"
166	Tom Leezer (NED)	LottoNL–Jumbo	+ 4h 32' 21"
167	Luke Rowe (GBR)	Team Sky	+ 4h 35' 52"

=== Points classification ===
Final points classification (1–10)
Rank	Rider	Team	Points
1	Michael Matthews (AUS)	Team Sunweb	370
2	André Greipel (GER)	Lotto–Soudal	234
3	Edvald Boasson Hagen (NOR)	Team Dimension Data	220
4	Alexander Kristoff (NOR)	Team Katusha–Alpecin	174
5	Sonny Colbrelli (ITA)	Bahrain–Merida	168
6	Thomas De Gendt (BEL)	Lotto–Soudal	149
7	Dylan Groenewegen (NED)	LottoNL–Jumbo	144
8	Chris Froome (GBR)	Team Sky	133
9	Rigoberto Urán (COL)	Cannondale–Drapac	106
10	Dan Martin (IRL)	Quick-Step Floors	106

=== Mountains classification ===
Final mountains classification (1–10)
Rank	Rider	Team	Points
1	Warren Barguil (FRA)	Team Sunweb	169
2	Primož Roglič (SLO)	LottoNL–Jumbo	80
3	Thomas De Gendt (BEL)	Lotto–Soudal	64
4	Darwin Atapuma (COL)	UAE Team Emirates	55
5	Chris Froome (GBR)	Team Sky	51
6	Romain Bardet (FRA)	AG2R La Mondiale	47
7	Mikel Landa (ESP)	Team Sky	45
8	Bauke Mollema (NED)	Trek–Segafredo	37
9	Alberto Contador (ESP)	Trek–Segafredo	36
10	Serge Pauwels (BEL)	Team Dimension Data	32

=== Young rider classification ===
Final young rider classification (1–10)
Rank	Rider	Team	Time
1	Simon Yates (GBR)	Orica–Scott	86h 27' 09"
2	Louis Meintjes (RSA)	UAE Team Emirates	+ 2' 06"
3	Emanuel Buchmann (GER)	Bora–Hansgrohe	+ 27' 07"
4	Tiesj Benoot (BEL)	Lotto–Soudal	+ 35' 50"
5	Guillaume Martin (FRA)	Wanty–Groupe Gobert	+ 47' 38"
6	Pierre Latour (FRA)	AG2R La Mondiale	+ 1h 12' 31"
7	Lilian Calmejane (FRA)	Direct Énergie	+ 1h 29' 02"
8	Michael Valgren (DEN)	Astana	+ 2h 19' 22"
9	Alexey Lutsenko (KAZ)	Astana	+ 2h 32' 56"
10	Dylan van Baarle (NED)	Cannondale–Drapac	+ 2h 40' 57"

=== Team classification ===
Final team classification (1–10)
Rank	Team	Time
1	(United Kingdom) Team Sky	259h 21' 06"
2	(France) AG2R La Mondiale	+ 7' 14"
3	(United States) Trek–Segafredo	+ 1h 44' 46"
4	(United States) BMC Racing Team	+ 1h 49' 49"
5	(Australia) Orica–Scott	+ 1h 52' 21"
6	(Spain) Movistar Team	+ 1h 55' 52"
7	(United States) Cannondale–Drapac	+ 2h 15' 25"
8	(France) Fortuneo–Oscaro	+ 2h 18' 18"
9	(Belgium) Lotto–Soudal	+ 2h 28' 18"
10	(Kazakhstan) Astana	+ 2h 28' 39"

== UCI rankings ==
Riders from the WorldTeams competing for individually and for their teams for points that contributed towards the World Tour rankings. Riders from both the WorldTeams and Professional Continental teams also competed individually and for their nations for points that contributed towards the UCI World Ranking, which included all UCI road races. Both rankings used the same points scale, awarding points to the top sixty in the general classification, each yellow jersey given at the end of a stage, the top five finishers in each stage and for the top three in the final points and mountains classifications. The points accrued by Chris Froome moved him from twentieth to sixth in the World Tour and kept his fifth place in the World Ranking. Greg Van Avermaet (BMC Racing Team) held the lead of both individual rankings. Quick-Step Floors and Belgium also holding the lead of the World Tour team ranking and World Ranking nation ranking, respectively.

UCI World Tour individual ranking on 23 July 2017 (1–10)
Rank	Prev.	Name	Team	Points
1	1	Greg Van Avermaet (BEL)	BMC Racing Team	2628
2	4	Alejandro Valverde (ESP)	Movistar Team	2105
3	21	Dan Martin (IRL)	Quick-Step Floors	2040
4	3	Richie Porte (AUS)	BMC Racing Team	1882
5	2	Tom Dumoulin (NED)	Team Sunweb	1851
6	20	Chris Froome (GBR)	Team Sky	1824
7	9	Michał Kwiatkowski (POL)	Team Sky	1771
8	11	Philippe Gilbert (BEL)	Quick-Step Floors	1765
9	5	Nairo Quintana (COL)	Movistar Team	1711
10	6	Peter Sagan (SVK)	Bora–Hansgrohe	1570

UCI World Ranking individual ranking on 24 July 2017 (1–10)
Rank	Prev.	Name	Team	Points
1	1	Greg Van Avermaet (BEL)	BMC Racing Team	5057.25
2	9	Peter Sagan (SVK)	Bora–Hansgrohe	3896
3	2	Alejandro Valverde (ESP)	Movistar Team	3295
4	8	Nairo Quintana (COL)	Movistar Team	3275
5	5	Chris Froome (GBR)	Team Sky	3066
6	5	Philippe Gilbert (BEL)	Quick-Step Floors	2419.4
7	25	Michael Matthews (AUS)	Team Sunweb	2409
8	4	Tom Dumoulin (NED)	Team Sunweb	2402
9	11	Alberto Contador (ESP)	Trek–Segafredo	2400
10	7	Dan Martin (IRL)	Quick-Step Floors	2349

== See also ==
- 2017 in men's road cycling
- 2017 in sports
- 2017 La Course by Le Tour de France

== Bibliography ==
- Augendre, Jacques (2017). Le Tour de France: Guide historique 2017 [Historical guide] (PDF) (in French). Paris: Amaury Sport Organisation. Archived (PDF) from the original on 6 July 2017.
- Roadbook. Paris: Amaury Sport Organisation. 2017.
- Race regulations (PDF). Paris: Amaury Sport Organisation. 2017. Archived (PDF) from the original on 18 July 2017.
- UCI cycling regulations (PDF). Part 2, road races. Aigle, Switzerland: Union Cycliste Internationale. 1 January 2017. Archived from the original (PDF) on 29 July 2017.
