= Pierre-Luc Périchon =

French cyclist

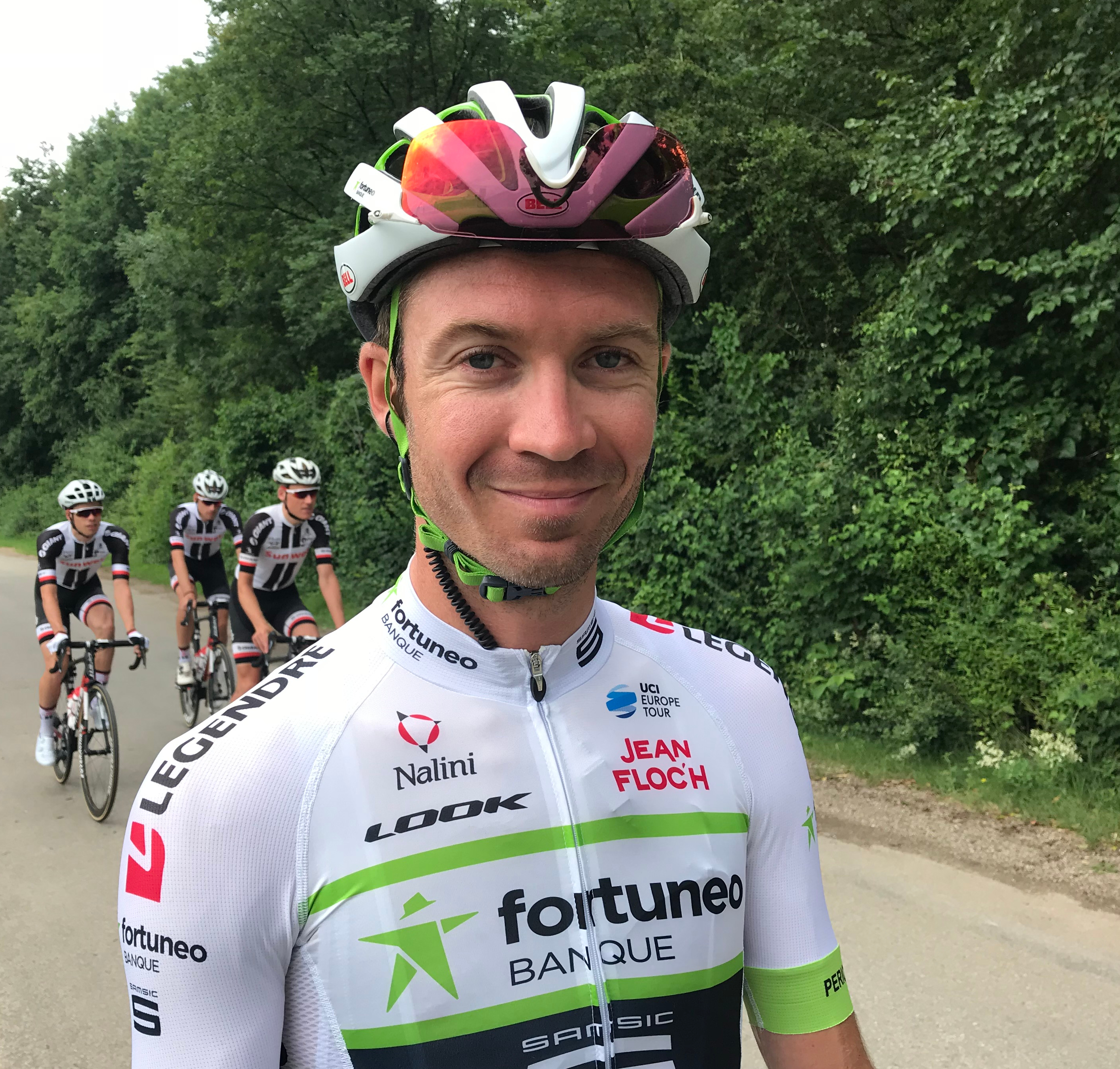
- Périchon in 2018.

Personal information
- Full name: Pierre-Luc Périchon
- Born: 4 January 1987 (age 39) Bourg-en-Bresse, France
- Height: 1.82 m (6 ft 0 in)
- Weight: 69 kg (152 lb; 10.9 st)

Cycling career
- Sport: Cycling
- Current team: Retired
- Disciplines: Road; Track
- Role: Rider
- Rider type: Puncheur

Amateur teams
- 2006: VC Ambérieu
- 2007–2008: Saint-Vulbas CC
- 2009–2011: SCO Dijon

Professional teams
- 2012: La Pomme Marseille
- 2013–2018: Bretagne–Séché Environnement
- 2019–2023: Cofidis

Pierre-Luc Périchon (born 4 January 1987) is a French former professional road and track bicycle racer.

During his career, Périchon took two professional victories – both coming in one-day races – at the 2012 Paris–Camembert and the 2018 Polynormande.

== Career ==
Born in Bourg-en-Bresse, Périchon competed as a professional from the start of the 2012 season, having signed a deal with the La Pomme Marseille team in August 2011. Périchon has also been a member of the VC Ambérieu, Saint-Vulbas CC, and SCO Dijon amateur teams.

Having featured highly in several domestic races during his career, Périchon won his first UCI Europe Tour race in April 2012, by winning the Paris–Camembert race. Attacking 45 kilometres (28.0 miles) from the finish in Camembert, Périchon won a three-man sprint to the finish line ahead of Saur–Sojasun's Cyril Bessy and Bretagne–Schuller's Jean-Marc Bideau. He was named in the start list for the 2015 Tour de France and the 2016 Tour de France. In October 2020, he was named in the startlist for the 2020 Vuelta a España.

Périchon announced that he would retire from the sport at the end of the 2023 season.

== Personal life ==
Périchon resides in Allinges.

== Major results ==
2003
1st Madison, National Novice Track Championships
2004
1st Madison, National Junior Track Championships
2005
2nd Points race, National Junior Track Championships
2006
2nd Points race, National Under-23 Track Championships
2007
National Track Championships

3rd Madison
3rd Under-23 points race

2008
2nd Madison, National Track Championships
2nd Tour du Charolais
6th Overall Tour des Pays de Savoie
2009
1st GP Blangy
3rd Tour du Haut-Berry
7th Overall Tour Alsace
8th Paris–Tours Espoirs
2010
1st Beuvry la Forêt
1st Stage 3 Tour de Franche Comté
5th Overall Rhône-Alpes Isère Tour
2011
1st Overall Les Boucles de l'Artois
1st GP Blangy
1st Stage 5 Tour Nivernais Morvan
2nd Points race, National Track Championships
2nd Overall Tour du Loir-et-Cher

1st Stage 2

2012
1st Paris–Camembert
9th Overall Étoile de Bessèges
9th Overall Boucles de la Mayenne
2013
7th Overall Tour de Bretagne

1st Stage 7

7th Tro-Bro Léon
2014
3rd Tour du Doubs
4th Tro-Bro Léon
8th Paris–Tours
8th Chrono des Nations
2015
3rd Overall Boucles de la Mayenne
4th Overall Tour de Langkawi
5th Tro-Bro Léon
9th Overall Tour des Pays de Savoie
Combativity award Stage 14 Tour de France
2016
1st Stage 3 Tour de Savoie Mont-Blanc
9th Overall Giro di Toscana
2017
1st Duo Normand (with Anthony Delaplace)
Tour de Savoie Mont-Blanc

1st Mountains classification
1st Stage 5

4th Road race, National Road Championships
5th Overall Three Days of De Panne
2018
1st Polynormande
4th Duo Normand (with Anthony Delaplace)
8th Road race, UEC European Road Championships
9th Tour du Doubs
2019
2nd Paris–Camembert
2021
2nd Paris–Camembert
3rd Overall Tour du Limousin
5th Tour de Vendée
7th Boucles de l'Aulne
9th Tour du Doubs
2023
6th Grand Prix La Marseillaise
7th Overall Tour de Wallonie

=== Grand Tour general classification results timeline ===
Grand Tour	2015	2016	2017	2018	2019	2020	2021	2022
Giro d'Italia	—	—	—	—	—	—	—	94
Tour de France	81	93	42	—	57	86	92	63
Vuelta a España	—	—	—	—	—	97	—	—

Legend
—	Did not compete
DNF	Did not finish
