= Romain Hardy =

French racing cyclist

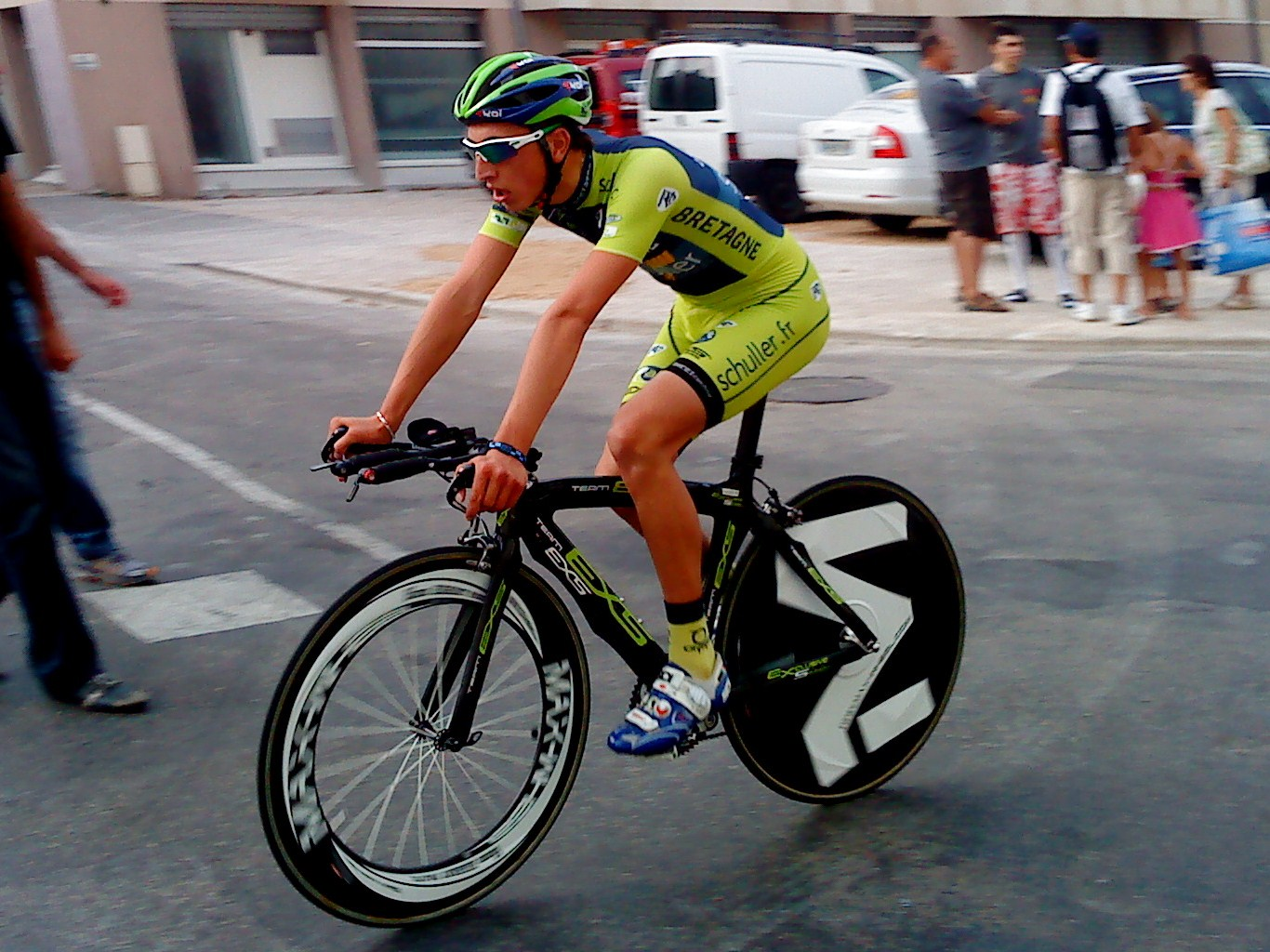
- Hardy at the 2010 Tour de l'Ain.

Personal information
- Full name: Romain Hardy
- Born: 24 August 1988 (age 38) Flers, Orne, France

Cycling career
- Sport: Cycling
- Current team: Arkéa–B&B Hotels
- Discipline: Road
- Role: Rider

Amateur team
- 2008–2009: Cote d'Armor Cyclisme

Professional teams
- 2010–2012: Bretagne–Schuller
- 2013–2016: Cofidis
- 2017–: Fortuneo–Vital Concept

Romain Hardy (born 24 August 1988) is a professional cyclist, who currently rides for UCI ProTeam Arkéa–B&B Hotels.

== Career ==
Hardy left Bretagne–Schuller at the end of the 2012 season, and joined Cofidis for the 2013 season. After four seasons with Cofidis, in September 2016 Hardy announced that he would rejoin the former Bretagne–Schuller team, now known as Fortuneo–Vital Concept, for the 2017 season. In June 2017, he was named in the startlist for the Tour de France.

== Major results ==
2008
2nd Overall Tour de Gironde
3rd Road race, National Under-23 Road Championships
6th Overall Kreiz Breizh Elites
2009
4th Liège–Bastogne–Liège Espoirs
6th Overall Grand Prix du Portugal
9th Overall Coupe des nations Ville Saguenay
2010
1st Stage 4 Tour de l'Avenir
3rd Polynormande
3rd Boucles de l'Aulne
4th Tour du Finistère
4th Prueba Villafranca de Ordizia
9th Overall Tour de Bretagne
10th Overall Rhône-Alpes Isère Tour
10th Overall Circuito Montañés
2011
2nd Paris–Camembert
2nd Tour du Doubs
5th Les Boucles du Sud Ardèche
7th Overall Tour du Gévaudan Languedoc-Roussillon
8th Tour du Finistère
9th Overall Tour Alsace
10th Cholet-Pays de Loire
2012
3rd Overall Rhône-Alpes Isère Tour
4th Overall Tour du Haut Var

1st Young rider classification
1st Stage 1

4th Grand Prix de la Ville de Lillers
6th Overall Tour Méditerranéen
6th Grand Prix La Marseillaise
2014
3rd Overall Tour of Turkey
4th Paris–Camembert
5th Overall Tour du Gévaudan Languedoc-Roussillon
6th Boucles de l'Aulne
6th Polynormande
7th Overall Tour de Luxembourg
10th Paris–Troyes
2016
9th Boucles de l'Aulne
2017
1st Tour du Doubs
2nd Trofeo Laigueglia
3rd Overall Tour du Haut Var
6th Tour du Finistère
7th La Drôme Classic
9th Tour de Vendée
10th Overall Étoile de Bessèges
2018
7th Boucles de l'Aulne
8th Grand Prix de Plumelec-Morbihan
2019
1st Stage 1 Tour de Savoie Mont-Blanc
2nd Overall Vuelta a la Comunidad de Madrid
4th Paris–Camembert
4th Tro-Bro Léon
8th Tour du Finistère
10th Paris–Troyes
2020
4th Tour du Doubs
9th Overall Tour de Wallonie
2021
5th Polynormande
6th Trofeo Serra de Tramuntana
7th Tour du Finistère
2022
7th Overall Tour de Bretagne
7th Overall Boucles de la Mayenne

=== Grand Tour general classification results timeline ===
Grand Tour	2014	2015	2016	2017	2018	2019
Giro d'Italia	Has not contested during his career					
Tour de France	—	—	—	26	105	—
Vuelta a España	64	DNF	27	—	—	—

Legend
—	Did not compete
DNF	Did not finish
