= Maxime Vantomme =

Belgian cyclist (born 1986)

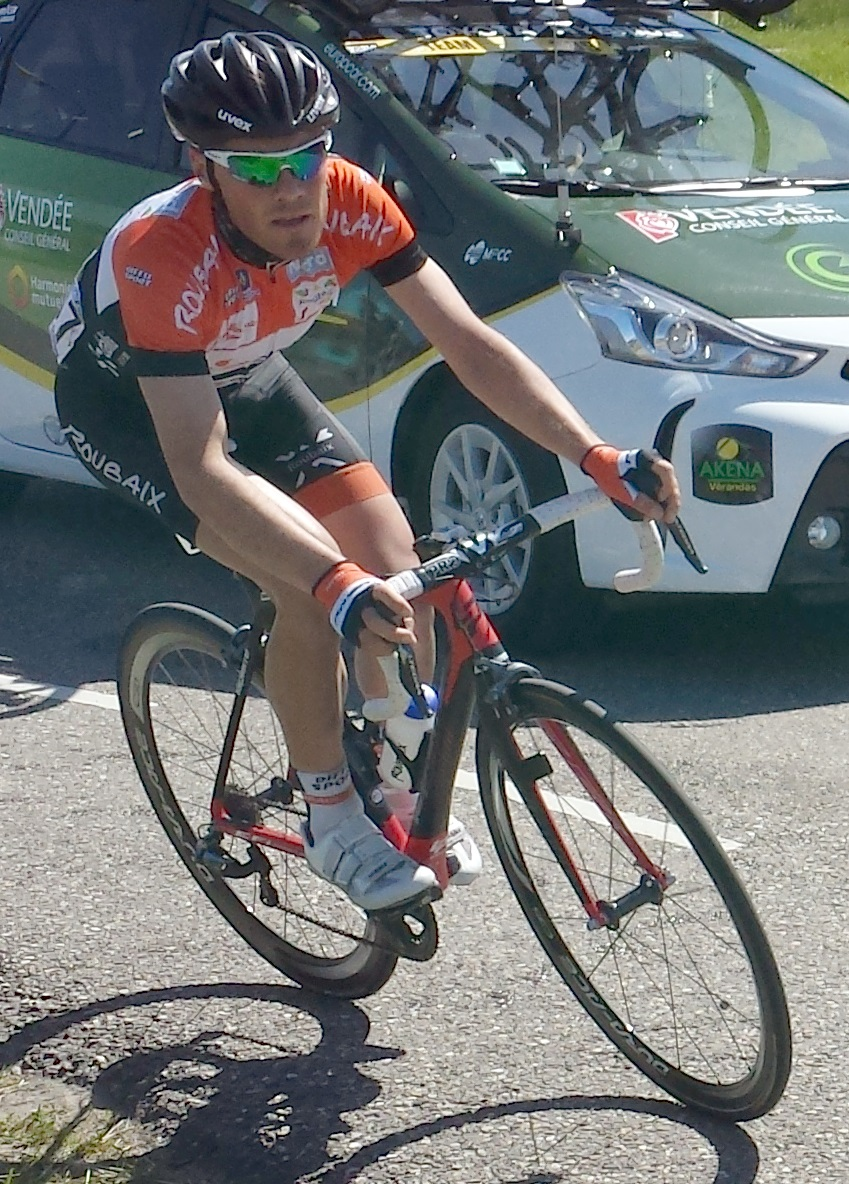
- Vantomme at the 2015 World Ports Classic.

Personal information
- Full name: Maxime Vantomme
- Nickname: Max
- Born: 8 March 1986 (age 40) Menen, Belgium
- Height: 1.74 m (5 ft 9 in)
- Weight: 63 kg (139 lb)

Cycling career
- Sport: Cycling
- Current team: Retired
- Discipline: Road
- Role: Rider
- Rider type: Climber; Classics rider

Amateur teams
- 2000: Elverdinge
- 2001: KSV Deerlijk
- 2002–2004: CT-Menen
- 2005–2007: Beveren 2000
- 2006: Quick-Step–Innergetic (stagiaire)
- 2021–2022: CT Borgonjon–Dewasport

Professional teams
- 2008: Mitsubishi–Jartazi
- 2009–2012: Team Katusha
- 2013: Crelan–Euphony
- 2014–2016: Roubaix–Lille Métropole
- 2017–2018: WB Veranclassic Aqua Protect
- 2019–2020: Tarteletto–Isorex

Maxime Vantomme (born 8 March 1986) is a Belgian former professional racing cyclist. Throughout his career, Vantomme competed for the Mitsubishi–Jartazi, Team Katusha, Crelan–Euphony, Roubaix–Métropole Européenne de Lille, WB Aqua Protect Veranclassic and Tarteletto–Isorex teams.

== Major results ==
2002
1st Gouden Fiets
2004
1st Overall Keizer der Juniores Koksijde
2005
2nd Zuidkempense Pijl
2nd Paris–Tours Espoirs
3rd Road race, National Under-23 Road Championships
3rd Memorial Van Coningsloo
2006
1st Memorial Danny Jonckheere Oudenburg
1st Stage 2 Ronde de l'Oise
3rd Brussel–Zepperen
10th Kampioenschap van Vlaanderen
2007
1st Memorial Danny Jonckheere Oudenburg
1st Stage 1a Tour des Pays de Savoie
3rd GP Stad Geel
2008
1st Stage 3 La Tropicale Amissa Bongo
8th Halle–Ingooigem
10th Ronde van Noord-Holland
2009
6th Nokere Koerse
7th Grote Prijs Jef Scherens
7th GP Gemeente Kortemark
2010
2nd Grote Prijs Jef Scherens
5th Overall Tour de Wallonie
6th Tour de Vendée
10th Classica Sarda
2011
5th Textielprijs
9th Handzame Classic
10th Overall Tour of Belgium
10th Grand Prix de Wallonie
2012
1st Heistse Pijl
6th Le Samyn
8th Overall Ster ZLM Toer
8th Nokere Koerse
2013
2nd Puivelde Koerse
4th Circuit de Wallonie
5th Dutch Food Valley Classic
7th Overall Tour du Poitou-Charentes
7th Grand Prix d'Ouverture La Marseillaise
7th Grand Prix de la Somme
8th Overall Arctic Race of Norway
10th Grand Prix Criquielion
2014
1st Overall Paris–Arras Tour

1st Stage 1 (TTT)

1st Le Samyn
4th Grand Prix de Plumelec-Morbihan
2015
1st Paris-Chauny
2016
4th Boucles de l'Aulne - Chateaulin
5th Grand Prix de la Ville de Lillers Souvenir Bruno Comini
5t Overall Circuit des Ardennes
7th Tour du Finistère
8th La Poly Normande
10th Grand Prix de Plumelec-Morbihan
2017
2nd Overall Circuit des Ardennes

1st Stage 3

3rd Dwars door de Vlaamse Ardennen
3rd Famenne Ardenne Classic
6th Overall Three Days of De Panne
6th Overall Tour de Wallonie
7th Tour de l'Eurométropole
8th Overall Étoile de Bessèges
8th Overall Ster ZLM Toer
2018
9th Nokere Koerse
