= Reto Hollenstein =

Swiss cyclist (born 1985)

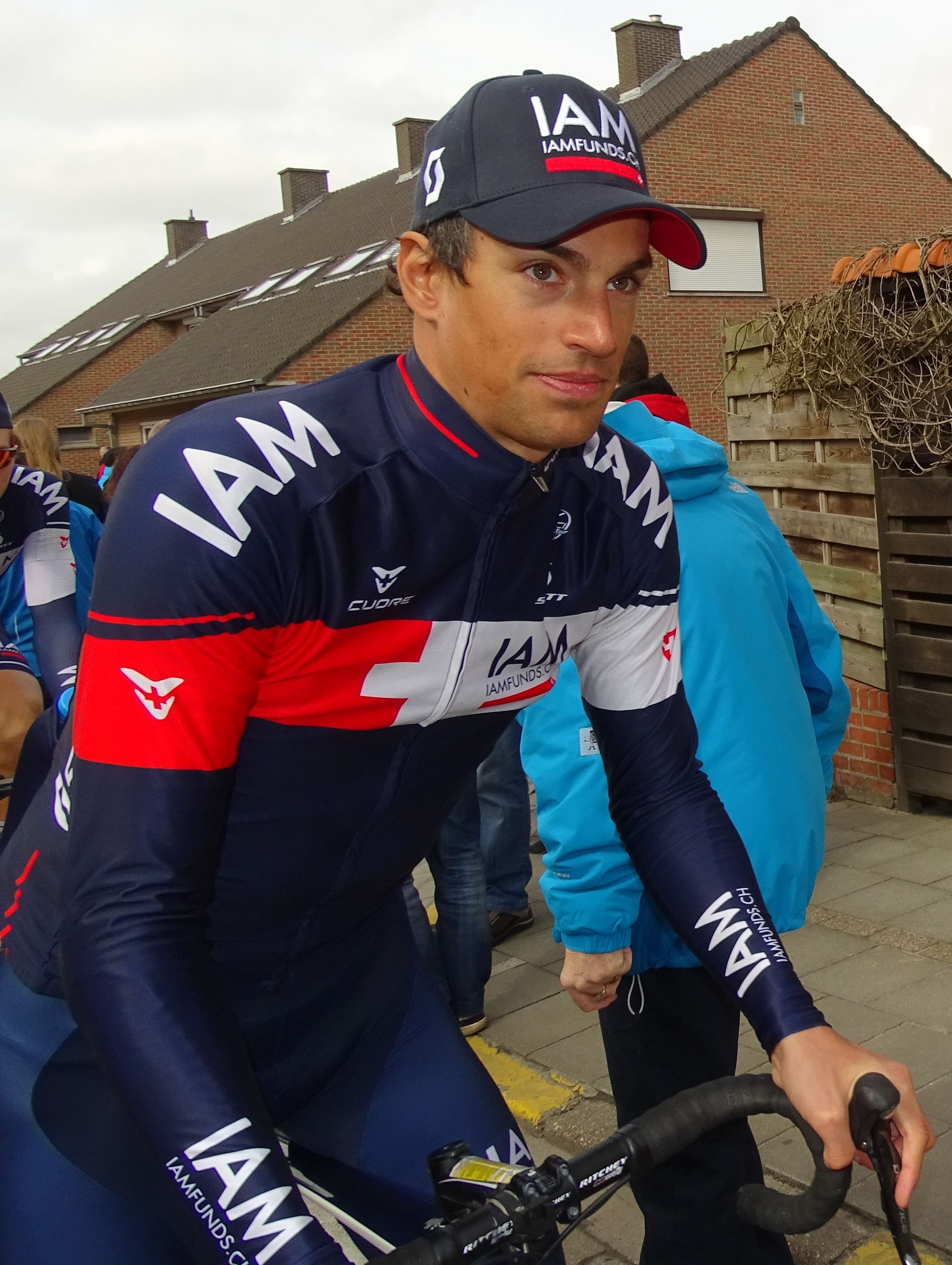
- Hollenstein in 2015

Personal information
- Born: 22 August 1985 (age 41) Frauenfeld, Switzerland
- Height: 1.97 m (6 ft 6 in)
- Weight: 80 kg (176 lb)

Cycling career
- Sport: Cycling
- Discipline: Road
- Role: Rider

Professional teams
- 2008: Atlas–Romer's Hausbäckerei
- 2009–2011: Vorarlberg–Corratec
- 2012: Team NetApp
- 2013–2016: IAM Cycling
- 2017–2019: Team Katusha–Alpecin
- 2020–2023: Israel Start-Up Nation

Reto Hollenstein (born 22 August 1985) is a former Swiss racing cyclist, who most recently rode for UCI ProTeam Israel–Premier Tech. He has competed in five editions of the Tour de France.

== Major results ==
2010
8th Giro dell'Appennino
2011
2nd Ljubljana–Zagreb
3rd Overall Oberösterreich Rundfahrt
5th Overall Tour du Gévaudan Languedoc-Roussillon
2013
National Road Championships

3rd Time trial
4th Road race

6th Tour de Berne
2014
7th Tour de Berne
2015
2nd Time trial, National Road Championships
7th Overall Tour de l'Eurométropole
2016
2nd Time trial, National Road Championships
2nd Overall Tour of Belgium
9th Overall Arctic Race of Norway
9th Time trial, UCI Road World Championships
2017
5th Time trial, National Road Championships
9th Overall Étoile de Bessèges
2019
3rd Time trial, National Road Championships

=== Grand Tour general classification results timeline ===
Grand Tour	2012	2013	2014	2015	2016	2017	2018	2019	2020	2021	2022
Giro d'Italia	DNF	—	—	—	—	—	—	94	—	—	129
Tour de France	—	—	DNF	75	97	150	—	—	—	136	—
Vuelta a España	—	—	—	—	—	—	55	—	72	—	—

Legend
—	Did not compete
DNF	Did not finish
