= 2017 Étoile de Bessèges =

UCI Europe Tour

Race details
- Dates: 1–5 February 2017
- Stages: 5
- Distance: 628.5 km (390.5 mi)
- Winning time: 14h 42' 51"

Results
Jersey awarded to the overall winner	Winner	Lilian Calmejane (France)	(Direct Énergie)
	Second	Tony Gallopin (France)	(Lotto–Soudal)
	Third	Mads Würtz Schmidt (Denmark)	(Team Katusha–Alpecin)
Jersey awarded to the points classification winner	Points	Alexander Kristoff (Norway)	(Team Katusha–Alpecin)
Jersey awarded to the mountains classification winner	Mountains	Nico Denz (Germany)	(AG2R La Mondiale)
Jersey awarded to the youth classification winner	Youth	Mads Würtz Schmidt (Denmark)	(Team Katusha–Alpecin)

The 2017 Étoile de Bessèges (English: Star of Bessèges) was a road cycling stage race that took place between 1 and 5 February 2017. The race was rated as a 2.1 event as part of the 2017 UCI Europe Tour, and was the 47th edition of the Étoile de Bessèges cycling race. The race included five stages; the first four were road stages while the fifth and final stage was an 11.9-kilometre (7.4 mi) individual time trial. The champion of the 2016 Étoile de Bessèges, Jérôme Coppel, did not defend his title as he had retired from professional cycling at the end of the 2016 season.

Direct Énergie rider Lilian Calmejane took the first professional stage race win of his career, after fending off a late charge from Lotto–Soudal's Tony Gallopin in the final stage time trial. Calmejane – who won the third stage of the race – held an 18-second lead over Gallopin going into the time trial, but despite Gallopin's best efforts, setting a time some 13 seconds quicker than anyone else, Calmejane was able to retain the race leader's orange jersey by 5 seconds. The podium was completed by the best young rider of the race, Mads Würtz Schmidt from Team Katusha–Alpecin, 24 seconds down on Calmejane. The race's other classifications were won by AG2R La Mondiale rider Nico Denz for the mountains classification, while Team Katusha–Alpecin's Alexander Kristoff won the points classification.

== Teams ==
Nineteen teams were invited to start the race. These included four UCI WorldTeams, nine UCI Professional Continental teams and six UCI Continental teams.

UCI WorldTeams

- AG2R La Mondiale
- FDJ
- Team Katusha–Alpecin
- Lotto–Soudal

UCI Professional Continental teams

- Caja Rural–Seguros RGA
- Cofidis
- Delko–Marseille Provence KTM
- Direct Énergie
- Fortuneo–Vital Concept
- Sport Vlaanderen–Baloise
- Vérandas Willems–Crelan
- Wanty–Groupe Gobert
- WB Veranclassic Aqua Protect

UCI Continental teams

- Armée de Terre
- An Post–Chain Reaction
- Cibel–Cebon
- HP BTP–Auber93
- Roth–Akros
- Roubaix–Lille Métropole

== Route ==
Stage schedule
Stage	Date	Route	Distance	Type	Winner
1	1 February	Bellegarde to Beaucaire	158.4 km (98 mi)	Hilly stage	Arnaud Démare (FRA)
2	2 February	Nîmes to Rodilhan	152.7 km (95 mi)	Hilly stage	Alexander Kristoff (NOR)
3	3 February	Bessèges to Bessèges	152.6 km (95 mi)	Hilly stage	Lilian Calmejane (FRA)
4	4 February	Chusclan to Laudun-l'Ardoise	152.9 km (95 mi)	Hilly stage	Arnaud Démare (FRA)
5	5 February	Alès to Alès	11.9 km (7 mi)	Individual time trial	Tony Gallopin (FRA)

== Stages ==
=== Stage 1 ===
1 February 2017 — Bellegarde to Beaucaire, 158.4 km (98 mi)

Result of Stage 1
Rank	Rider	Team	Time
1	Arnaud Démare (FRA)	FDJ	3h 34' 19"
2	Alexander Kristoff (NOR)	Team Katusha–Alpecin	+ 0"
3	Roy Jans (BEL)	WB Veranclassic Aqua Protect	+ 0"
4	Florian Sénéchal (FRA)	Cofidis	+ 0"
5	Rudy Barbier (FRA)	AG2R La Mondiale	+ 0"
6	Bert Van Lerberghe (BEL)	Sport Vlaanderen–Baloise	+ 0"
7	Jasper De Buyst (BEL)	Lotto–Soudal	+ 0"
8	Christophe Laporte (FRA)	Cofidis	+ 0"
9	Damien Touzé (FRA)	HP BTP–Auber93	+ 0"
10	Jérémy Lecroq (FRA)	Roubaix–Lille Métropole	+ 0"

General classification after Stage 1
Rank	Rider	Team	Time
1	Arnaud Démare (FRA)	FDJ	3h 34' 09"
2	Alexander Kristoff (NOR)	Team Katusha–Alpecin	+ 4"
3	Roy Jans (BEL)	WB Veranclassic Aqua Protect	+ 6"
4	Nico Denz (GER)	AG2R La Mondiale	+ 7"
5	Kévin Lebreton (FRA)	Armée de Terre	+ 8"
6	Jérémy Bescond (FRA)	HP BTP–Auber93	+ 9"
7	Florian Sénéchal (FRA)	Cofidis	+ 10"
8	Rudy Barbier (FRA)	AG2R La Mondiale	+ 10"
9	Bert Van Lerberghe (BEL)	Sport Vlaanderen–Baloise	+ 10"
10	Jasper De Buyst (BEL)	Lotto–Soudal	+ 10"

=== Stage 2 ===
2 February 2017 — Nîmes to Rodilhan, 152.7 km (95 mi)

Result of Stage 2
Rank	Rider	Team	Time
1	Alexander Kristoff (NOR)	Team Katusha–Alpecin	3h 26' 59"
2	Rudy Barbier (FRA)	AG2R La Mondiale	+ 0"
3	Arnaud Démare (FRA)	FDJ	+ 0"
4	Lilian Calmejane (FRA)	Direct Énergie	+ 0"
5	Maxime Vantomme (BEL)	WB Veranclassic Aqua Protect	+ 0"
6	Pieter Vanspeybrouck (BEL)	Wanty–Groupe Gobert	+ 0"
7	Christophe Laporte (FRA)	Cofidis	+ 0"
8	Sylvain Chavanel (FRA)	Direct Énergie	+ 0"
9	Rick Zabel (GER)	Team Katusha–Alpecin	+ 0"
10	Pierre Latour (FRA)	AG2R La Mondiale	+ 0"

General classification after Stage 2
Rank	Rider	Team	Time
1	Alexander Kristoff (NOR)	Team Katusha–Alpecin	7h 01' 00"
2	Arnaud Démare (FRA)	FDJ	+ 4"
3	Rudy Barbier (FRA)	AG2R La Mondiale	+ 12"
4	Tony Gallopin (FRA)	Lotto–Soudal	+ 15"
5	Christophe Laporte (FRA)	Cofidis	+ 18"
6	Florian Sénéchal (FRA)	Cofidis	+ 18"
7	Maxime Vantomme (BEL)	WB Veranclassic Aqua Protect	+ 18"
8	Sylvain Chavanel (FRA)	Direct Énergie	+ 18"
9	Lilian Calmejane (FRA)	Direct Énergie	+ 18"
10	Pierre Latour (FRA)	AG2R La Mondiale	+ 18"

=== Stage 3 ===
3 February 2017 — Bessèges to Bessèges, 152.6 km (95 mi)

Result of Stage 3
Rank	Rider	Team	Time
1	Lilian Calmejane (FRA)	Direct Énergie	3h 48' 07"
2	Mads Würtz Schmidt (DEN)	Team Katusha–Alpecin	+ 7"
3	Mauro Finetto (ITA)	Delko–Marseille Provence KTM	+ 9"
4	Samuel Dumoulin (FRA)	AG2R La Mondiale	+ 9"
5	Nils Politt (GER)	Team Katusha–Alpecin	+ 9"
6	Sylvain Chavanel (FRA)	Direct Énergie	+ 9"
7	Romain Hardy (FRA)	Fortuneo–Vital Concept	+ 9"
8	Christophe Laporte (FRA)	Cofidis	+ 9"
9	Frederik Backaert (BEL)	Wanty–Groupe Gobert	+ 9"
10	Reto Hollenstein (SUI)	Team Katusha–Alpecin	+ 9"

General classification after Stage 3
Rank	Rider	Team	Time
1	Lilian Calmejane (FRA)	Direct Énergie	10h 49' 09"
2	Mads Würtz Schmidt (DEN)	Team Katusha–Alpecin	+ 17"
3	Tony Gallopin (FRA)	Lotto–Soudal	+ 18"
4	Sylvain Chavanel (FRA)	Direct Énergie	+ 22"
5	Christophe Laporte (FRA)	Cofidis	+ 25"
6	Pierre Latour (FRA)	AG2R La Mondiale	+ 25"
7	Reto Hollenstein (SUI)	Team Katusha–Alpecin	+ 25"
8	Nils Politt (GER)	Team Katusha–Alpecin	+ 25"
9	Romain Hardy (FRA)	Fortuneo–Vital Concept	+ 25"
10	Maxime Vantomme (BEL)	WB Veranclassic Aqua Protect	+ 33"

=== Stage 4 ===
4 February 2017 — Chusclan to Laudun-l'Ardoise, 152.9 km (95 mi)

Result of Stage 4
Rank	Rider	Team	Time
1	Arnaud Démare (FRA)	FDJ	3h 36' 24"
2	Alexander Kristoff (NOR)	Team Katusha–Alpecin	+ 0"
3	Christophe Laporte (FRA)	Cofidis	+ 0"
4	Armindo Fonseca (FRA)	Fortuneo–Vital Concept	+ 0"
5	Mads Würtz Schmidt (DEN)	Team Katusha–Alpecin	+ 0"
6	Pieter Vanspeybrouck (BEL)	Wanty–Groupe Gobert	+ 0"
7	Roy Jans (BEL)	WB Veranclassic Aqua Protect	+ 0"
8	Eduard Prades (ESP)	Caja Rural–Seguros RGA	+ 0"
9	Andrea Pasqualon (ITA)	Wanty–Groupe Gobert	+ 0"
10	Maxime Vantomme (BEL)	WB Veranclassic Aqua Protect	+ 0"

General classification after Stage 4
Rank	Rider	Team	Time
1	Lilian Calmejane (FRA)	Direct Énergie	14h 25' 33"
2	Mads Würtz Schmidt (DEN)	Team Katusha–Alpecin	+ 17"
3	Tony Gallopin (FRA)	Lotto–Soudal	+ 18"
4	Christophe Laporte (FRA)	Cofidis	+ 21"
5	Sylvain Chavanel (FRA)	Direct Énergie	+ 22"
6	Pierre Latour (FRA)	AG2R La Mondiale	+ 25"
7	Nils Politt (GER)	Team Katusha–Alpecin	+ 25"
8	Reto Hollenstein (SUI)	Team Katusha–Alpecin	+ 25"
9	Romain Hardy (FRA)	Fortuneo–Vital Concept	+ 25"
10	Maxime Vantomme (BEL)	WB Veranclassic Aqua Protect	+ 33"

=== Stage 5 ===
5 February 2017 — Alès to Alès, 11.9 km (7 mi), individual time trial (ITT)

Result of Stage 5
Rank	Rider	Team	Time
1	Tony Gallopin (FRA)	Lotto–Soudal	17' 05"
2	Lilian Calmejane (FRA)	Direct Énergie	+ 13"
3	Pierre Latour (FRA)	AG2R La Mondiale	+ 17"
4	Mads Würtz Schmidt (DEN)	Team Katusha–Alpecin	+ 20"
5	Sylvain Chavanel (FRA)	Direct Énergie	+ 22"
6	Olivier Pardini (BEL)	WB Veranclassic Aqua Protect	+ 38"
7	Nils Politt (GER)	Team Katusha–Alpecin	+ 41"
8	Kevyn Ista (BEL)	WB Veranclassic Aqua Protect	+ 51"
9	Christophe Laporte (FRA)	Cofidis	+ 51"
10	Anthony Turgis (FRA)	Cofidis	+ 52"

Final general classification
Rank	Rider	Team	Time
1	Lilian Calmejane (FRA)	Direct Énergie	14h 42' 51"
2	Tony Gallopin (FRA)	Lotto–Soudal	+ 5"
3	Mads Würtz Schmidt (DEN)	Team Katusha–Alpecin	+ 24"
4	Pierre Latour (FRA)	AG2R La Mondiale	+ 29"
5	Sylvain Chavanel (FRA)	Direct Énergie	+ 31"
6	Nils Politt (GER)	Team Katusha–Alpecin	+ 53"
7	Christophe Laporte (FRA)	Cofidis	+ 59"
8	Maxime Vantomme (BEL)	WB Veranclassic Aqua Protect	+ 1' 18"
9	Reto Hollenstein (SUI)	Team Katusha–Alpecin	+ 1' 33"
10	Romain Hardy (FRA)	Fortuneo–Vital Concept	+ 2' 11"

== Classification leadership table ==
In the 2017 Étoile de Bessèges, four different jerseys were awarded. For the general classification, calculated by adding each cyclist's finishing times on each stage, and allowing time bonuses for the first three finishers at intermediate sprints and at the finish of mass-start stages, the leader received an orange jersey. This classification was considered the most important of the 2017 Étoile de Bessèges, and the winner of the classification was considered the winner of the race.

Additionally, there was a points classification, which awarded a yellow jersey. In the points classification, cyclists received points for finishing in the top 15 in a mass-start stage. For winning a stage, a rider earned 25 points, with 20 for second, 16 for third, 13 for fourth, 11 for fifth with a point fewer per place down to a single point for 15th place. Points towards the classification could also be accrued at intermediate sprint points during each stage; these intermediate sprints also offered bonus seconds towards the general classification. There was also a mountains classification, the leadership of which was marked by a blue jersey. In the mountains classification, points were won by reaching the top of a climb before other cyclists, with more points available for the higher-categorised climbs.

The fourth jersey represented the young rider classification, marked by a white jersey. This was decided in the same way as the general classification, but only riders born after 1 January 1994 were eligible to be ranked in the classification.

Stage	Winner	General classification	Points classification	Mountains classification	Young rider classification
1	Arnaud Démare	Arnaud Démare	Arnaud Démare	Nico Denz	Nico Denz
2	Alexander Kristoff	Alexander Kristoff	Alexander Kristoff	Nico Denz	Nils Politt
3	Lilian Calmejane	Lilian Calmejane	Lilian Calmejane	Nico Denz	Mads Würtz Schmidt
4	Arnaud Démare	Lilian Calmejane	Alexander Kristoff	Nico Denz	Mads Würtz Schmidt
5	Tony Gallopin	Lilian Calmejane	Alexander Kristoff	Nico Denz	Mads Würtz Schmidt
Final		Lilian Calmejane	Alexander Kristoff	Nico Denz	Mads Würtz Schmidt
