= 2017 Three Days of De Panne =

2017 UCI Europe Tour

Race details
- Dates: 28–30 March 2017
- Stages: 4
- Distance: 531.1 km (330.0 mi)
- Winning time: 12h 08' 57"

Results
Jersey awarded to the overall winner	Winner	Philippe Gilbert (BEL)	(Quick-Step Floors)
	Second	Matthias Brändle (AUT)	(Trek–Segafredo)
	Third	Alexander Kristoff (NOR)	(Team Katusha–Alpecin)
Jersey awarded to the points classification winner	Points	Alexander Kristoff (NOR)	(Team Katusha–Alpecin)
Jersey awarded to the mountains classification winner	Mountains	Piet Allegaert (BEL)	(Sport Vlaanderen–Baloise)
	Young rider	Simone Consonni (ITA)	(UAE Team Emirates)
Jersey awarded to the sprints classification winner	Sprints	Philippe Gilbert (BEL)	(Quick-Step Floors)
	Team	Trek–Segafredo	

The 2017 Three Days of De Panne (Dutch: Driedaagse De Panne–Koksijde) was the 41st edition of the Three Days of De Panne cycling stage race. The race included four stages over three days, from 28–30 March 2017. It was rated as a 2.HC event in the 2017 UCI Europe Tour.

The race was won by Quick-Step Floors rider Philippe Gilbert, after he attacked on the Muur van Geraardsbergen during the race's opening stage and soloed away to the victory by 17 seconds from his nearest competitor. He ultimately won the race by 38 seconds ahead of Trek–Segafredo's Matthias Brändle, while the podium was completed by Alexander Kristoff from Team Katusha–Alpecin, who won the second stage of the race. Kristoff's consistent finishing over the stages won him the points classification, while Gilbert won the sprints classification, primarily from his opening-day attack.

In the race's other classifications, Sport Vlaanderen–Baloise rider Piet Allegaert was the winner of the mountains classification, Simone Consonni from UAE Team Emirates was the winner of the Bernard Van de Kerckhove Trophy, as the best-placed rider under the age of 23 – in thirteenth place overall – while Trek–Segafredo won the teams classification, as Brändle, Edward Theuns and Boy van Poppel all finished within the top ten placings in the general classification.

== Route ==
The race included four stages; three road stages, while the fourth and final stage was an individual time trial.

Stage	Date	Course	Distance	Type	Winner
1	28 March	De Panne to Zottegem	205.5 km (127.7 mi)	Medium-mountain stage	Philippe Gilbert (BEL)
2	29 March	Zottegem to Koksijde	192.9 km (119.9 mi)	Hilly stage	Alexander Kristoff (NOR)
3a	30 March	De Panne to De Panne	118.5 km (73.6 mi)	Flat stage	Marcel Kittel (GER)
3b	30 March	De Panne to De Panne	14.2 km (9 mi)	Individual time trial	Luke Durbridge (AUS)
Total		531.1 km (330 mi)			

== Teams ==
24 teams took part in the 2017 Three Days of De Panne. 7 of these were UCI WorldTeams, 13 were UCI Professional Continental teams, and 4 were UCI Professional Continental teams.

UCI WorldTeams

- Bora–Hansgrohe
- Team Katusha–Alpecin
- Lotto–Soudal
- Orica–Scott
- Quick-Step Floors
- Trek–Segafredo
- UAE Team Emirates

UCI Professional Continental teams

- Aqua Blue Sport
- Bardiani–CSF
- Direct Énergie
- Gazprom–RusVelo
- Israel Cycling Academy
- Nippo–Vini Fantini
- Roompot–Nederlandse Loterij
- Sport Vlaanderen–Baloise
- Vérandas Willems–Crelan
- Wanty–Groupe Gobert
- WB Veranclassic Aqua Protect
- Wilier Triestina–Selle Italia
- Fortuneo–Vital Concept

UCI Continental teams

- Cibel–Cebon
- Joker Icopal
- Pauwels Sauzen–Vastgoedservice
- Tarteletto–Isorex

== Stages ==
=== Stage 1 ===
28 March 2017 — De Panne to Zottegem, 205.5 km (127.7 mi)

Result of Stage 1
Rank	Rider	Team	Time
1	Philippe Gilbert (BEL)	Quick-Step Floors	4h 36' 18"
2	Luke Durbridge (AUS)	Orica–Scott	+ 17"
3	Simone Consonni (ITA)	UAE Team Emirates	+ 34"
4	Jasper De Buyst (BEL)	Lotto–Soudal	+ 34"
5	Matthias Brändle (AUT)	Trek–Segafredo	+ 34"
6	Frederik Backaert (BEL)	Wanty–Groupe Gobert	+ 53"
7	Alexander Kristoff (NOR)	Team Katusha–Alpecin	+ 58"
8	Edward Theuns (BEL)	Trek–Segafredo	+ 58"
9	Marco Canola (ITA)	Nippo–Vini Fantini	+ 58"
10	Sacha Modolo (ITA)	UAE Team Emirates	+ 58"

General classification after Stage 1
Rank	Rider	Team	Time
1	Philippe Gilbert (BEL)	Quick-Step Floors	4h 36' 05"
2	Luke Durbridge (AUS)	Orica–Scott	+ 22"
3	Simone Consonni (ITA)	UAE Team Emirates	+ 43"
4	Matthias Brändle (AUT)	Trek–Segafredo	+ 46"
5	Jasper De Buyst (BEL)	Lotto–Soudal	+ 47"
6	Frederik Backaert (BEL)	Wanty–Groupe Gobert	+ 1' 06"
7	Alexander Kristoff (NOR)	Team Katusha–Alpecin	+ 1' 11"
8	Edward Theuns (BEL)	Trek–Segafredo	+ 1' 11"
9	Marco Canola (ITA)	Nippo–Vini Fantini	+ 1' 11"
10	Sacha Modolo (ITA)	UAE Team Emirates	+ 1' 11"

=== Stage 2 ===
29 March 2017 — Zottegem to Koksijde, 192.9 km (119.9 mi)

Result of Stage 2
Rank	Rider	Team	Time
1	Alexander Kristoff (NOR)	Team Katusha–Alpecin	4h 37' 29"
2	Edward Theuns (BEL)	Trek–Segafredo	+ 0"
3	Marcel Kittel (GER)	Quick-Step Floors	+ 0"
4	Pascal Ackermann (GER)	Bora–Hansgrohe	+ 0"
5	Andrea Guardini (ITA)	UAE Team Emirates	+ 0"
6	Maxime Vantomme (BEL)	WB Veranclassic Aqua Protect	+ 0"
7	Adrien Petit (FRA)	Direct Énergie	+ 0"
8	Coen Vermeltfoort (NED)	Roompot–Nederlandse Loterij	+ 0"
9	Pierre-Luc Périchon (FRA)	Fortuneo–Vital Concept	+ 0"
10	Conor Dunne (IRL)	Aqua Blue Sport	+ 0"

General classification after Stage 2
Rank	Rider	Team	Time
1	Philippe Gilbert (BEL)	Quick-Step Floors	9h 13' 28"
2	Matthias Brändle (AUT)	Trek–Segafredo	+ 50"
3	Alexander Kristoff (NOR)	Team Katusha–Alpecin	+ 1' 07"
4	Edward Theuns (BEL)	Trek–Segafredo	+ 1' 11"
5	Pim Ligthart (NED)	Roompot–Nederlandse Loterij	+ 1' 15"
6	Sylvain Chavanel (FRA)	Direct Énergie	+ 1' 15"
7	Maxime Vantomme (BEL)	WB Veranclassic Aqua Protect	+ 1' 17"
8	Pierre-Luc Périchon (FRA)	Fortuneo–Vital Concept	+ 1' 17"
9	Boy van Poppel (NED)	Trek–Segafredo	+ 1' 22"
10	Jasper De Buyst (BEL)	Lotto–Soudal	+ 2' 25"

=== Stage 3a ===
30 March 2017 — De Panne to De Panne, 118.5 km (73.6 mi)

Result of Stage 3a
Rank	Rider	Team	Time
1	Marcel Kittel (GER)	Quick-Step Floors	2h 37' 29"
2	Alexander Kristoff (NOR)	Team Katusha–Alpecin	+ 0"
3	Sacha Modolo (ITA)	UAE Team Emirates	+ 0"
4	Rüdiger Selig (GER)	Bora–Hansgrohe	+ 0"
5	Edward Theuns (BEL)	Trek–Segafredo	+ 0"
6	Matteo Pelucchi (ITA)	Bora–Hansgrohe	+ 0"
7	Jens Debusschere (BEL)	Lotto–Soudal	+ 0"
8	Luka Mezgec (SLO)	Orica–Scott	+ 0"
9	Jelle Mannaerts (BEL)	Tarteletto–Isorex	+ 0"
10	Jonas Rickaert (BEL)	Sport Vlaanderen–Baloise	+ 0"

General classification after Stage 3a
Rank	Rider	Team	Time
1	Philippe Gilbert (BEL)	Quick-Step Floors	11h 51' 02"
2	Matthias Brändle (AUT)	Trek–Segafredo	+ 50"
3	Alexander Kristoff (NOR)	Team Katusha–Alpecin	+ 58"
4	Edward Theuns (BEL)	Trek–Segafredo	+ 1' 06"
5	Sylvain Chavanel (FRA)	Direct Énergie	+ 1' 15"
6	Pim Ligthart (NED)	Roompot–Nederlandse Loterij	+ 1' 15"
7	Maxime Vantomme (BEL)	WB Veranclassic Aqua Protect	+ 1' 17"
8	Pierre-Luc Périchon (FRA)	Fortuneo–Vital Concept	+ 1' 17"
9	Boy van Poppel (NED)	Trek–Segafredo	+ 1' 22"
10	Jasper De Buyst (BEL)	Lotto–Soudal	+ 2' 20"

=== Stage 3b ===
30 March 2017 — De Panne to De Panne, 14.2 km (9 mi), individual time trial (ITT)

Result of Stage 3b
Rank	Rider	Team	Time
1	Luke Durbridge (AUS)	Orica–Scott	17' 38"
2	Sylvain Chavanel (FRA)	Direct Énergie	+ 0"
3	Alexander Kristoff (NOR)	Team Katusha–Alpecin	+ 2"
4	Marcel Kittel (GER)	Quick-Step Floors	+ 3"
5	Matthias Brändle (AUT)	Trek–Segafredo	+ 5"
6	Alex Edmondson (AUS)	Orica–Scott	+ 9"
7	Philippe Gilbert (BEL)	Quick-Step Floors	+ 17"
8	Nils Politt (GER)	Team Katusha–Alpecin	+ 31"
9	Peter Koning (NED)	Aqua Blue Sport	+ 36"
10	Olivier Pardini (BEL)	WB Veranclassic Aqua Protect	+ 39"

Final general classification
Rank	Rider	Team	Time
1	Philippe Gilbert (BEL)	Quick-Step Floors	12h 08' 57"
2	Matthias Brändle (AUT)	Trek–Segafredo	+ 38"
3	Alexander Kristoff (NOR)	Team Katusha–Alpecin	+ 43"
4	Sylvain Chavanel (FRA)	Direct Énergie	+ 58"
5	Pierre-Luc Périchon (FRA)	Fortuneo–Vital Concept	+ 1' 39"
6	Maxime Vantomme (BEL)	WB Veranclassic Aqua Protect	+ 1' 50"
7	Edward Theuns (BEL)	Trek–Segafredo	+ 1' 54"
8	Pim Ligthart (NED)	Roompot–Nederlandse Loterij	+ 2' 10"
9	Boy van Poppel (NED)	Trek–Segafredo	+ 2' 24"
10	Jasper De Buyst (BEL)	Lotto–Soudal	+ 2' 46"

== Classification leadership table ==
In the 2017 Three Days of De Panne, four different jerseys were awarded. For the general classification, which was calculated by adding each cyclist's finishing times on each stage, and allowing time bonuses for the first three finishers at intermediate sprints and at the finish of mass-start stages, the leader received a white jersey. This classification was considered the most important of the 2017 Three Days of De Panne, and the winner of the classification was considered the winner of the race.

Additionally, there was a points classification, which awarded a green jersey. In the points classification, cyclists received points for finishing in the top placings of a stage. On the first two days; for winning a stage, a rider earned 20 points, with 18 for second, 16 for third, 14 for fourth, 12 for fifth, 10 for sixth with a point fewer per place down to a single point for 15th place. On the final day, points were awarded to the top 10 riders, with 10 points for the winner and a point fewer per place down to a single point for 10th place. There was also a sprints classification for points awarded at the race's intermediate sprints, where riders received points for finishing in the top three at these sprints; the leadership of which was marked by a blue jersey.

There was also a mountains classification, the leadership of which was marked by a red jersey. Points for this classification were won by the first riders to the top of each categorised climb, on a 5–3–1 scale as all climbs were categorised the same. There was also a classification for teams, in which the times of the best three cyclists per team on each stage were added together; the leading team at the end of the race was the team with the lowest total time.

Stage	Winner	General classification	Points classification	Mountains classification	Sprints classification	Team classification
1	Philippe Gilbert	Philippe Gilbert	Philippe Gilbert	Brice Feillu	Philippe Gilbert	Trek–Segafredo
2	Alexander Kristoff	Philippe Gilbert	Alexander Kristoff	Piet Allegaert	Philippe Gilbert	Trek–Segafredo
3a	Marcel Kittel	Philippe Gilbert	Alexander Kristoff	Piet Allegaert	Philippe Gilbert	Trek–Segafredo
3b	Luke Durbridge	Philippe Gilbert	Alexander Kristoff	Piet Allegaert	Philippe Gilbert	Trek–Segafredo
Final		Philippe Gilbert	Alexander Kristoff	Piet Allegaert	Philippe Gilbert	Trek–Segafredo
