= 2017 Tour du Haut Var =

2017 UCI Europe Tour

Race details
- Dates: 18–19 February 2017
- Stages: 2
- Distance: 351 km (218 mi)
- Winning time: 9h 06' 49"

Results
Jersey awarded to the overall winner	Winner	Arthur Vichot (France)	(FDJ)
	Second	Julien Simon (France)	(Cofidis)
	Third	Romain Hardy (France)	(Fortuneo–Vital Concept)
Jersey awarded to the points classification winner	Points	Arthur Vichot (France)	(FDJ)
Jersey awarded to the mountains classification winner	Mountains	Franck Bonnamour (France)	(Fortuneo–Vital Concept)
Jersey awarded to the young rider classification winner	Young rider	Tom Bohli (Switzerland)	(BMC Racing Team)
	Team	BMC Racing Team	

The 2017 Tour du Haut Var was a road cycling stage race that took place on 18 and 19 February 2017. The race was rated as a 2.1 event as part of the 2017 UCI Europe Tour, and was the 49th edition of the Tour du Haut Var.

As in 2016, the overall race victory was decided upon cumulative stage finishes, after nine riders finished both stages in the same time. With stage finishes of second and third, Arthur Vichot took honours in both the general classification and the points classification for the FDJ team. Second place in the overall standings went to Julien Simon (Cofidis) with finishes of eighth and first, while the podium was completed by Fortuneo–Vital Concept's Romain Hardy, with two sixth-place finishes. Tom Bohli won the young rider classification for BMC Racing Team, Franck Bonnamour (Fortuneo–Vital Concept) won the mountains classification, while the teams classification was won by the BMC Racing Team.

== Teams ==
Sixteen teams were invited to start the race. These included three UCI WorldTeams, six UCI Professional Continental teams and seven UCI Continental teams.

UCI WorldTeams

- AG2R La Mondiale
- BMC Racing Team
- FDJ

UCI Professional Continental teams

- Cofidis
- Delko–Marseille Provence KTM
- Direct Énergie
- WB Veranclassic Aqua Protect
- Androni Giocattoli–Sidermec
- Fortuneo–Vital Concept

UCI Continental teams

- Amore & Vita–Selle SMP
- Armée de Terre
- GM Europa Ovini
- HP BTP–Auber93
- Kuwait–Cartucho.es
- Roth–Akros
- Roubaix–Lille Métropole

== Route ==
Stage schedule
Stage	Date	Route	Distance	Type	Winner
1	18 February	Le Cannet-des-Maures to Saint-Paul-en-Forêt	145 km (90 mi)	Hilly stage	Samuel Dumoulin (FRA)
2	19 February	Draguignan to Draguignan	206 km (128 mi)	Hilly stage	Julien Simon (FRA)

== Stages ==
=== Stage 1 ===
18 February 2017 — Le Cannet-des-Maures to Saint-Paul-en-Forêt, 145 km (90 mi)

Result of Stage 1 & General classification after Stage 1
Rank	Rider	Team	Time
1	Samuel Dumoulin (FRA)	AG2R La Mondiale	3h 44' 48"
2	Arthur Vichot (FRA)	FDJ	+ 0"
3	Maxime Vantomme (BEL)	WB Veranclassic Aqua Protect	+ 0"
4	Kevyn Ista (BEL)	WB Veranclassic Aqua Protect	+ 0"
5	Francesco Gavazzi (ITA)	Androni Giocattoli–Sidermec	+ 0"
6	Romain Hardy (FRA)	Fortuneo–Vital Concept	+ 0"
7	Damiano Caruso (ITA)	BMC Racing Team	+ 0"
8	Julien Simon (FRA)	Cofidis	+ 0"
9	Bastien Duculty (FRA)	Armée de Terre	+ 0"
10	Lilian Calmejane (FRA)	Direct Énergie	+ 0"

=== Stage 2 ===
19 February 2017 — Draguignan to Draguignan, 206 km (128 mi)

Result of Stage 2
Rank	Rider	Team	Time
1	Julien Simon (FRA)	Cofidis	5h 22' 01"
2	Julien El Fares (FRA)	Delko–Marseille Provence KTM	+ 0"
3	Arthur Vichot (FRA)	FDJ	+ 0"
4	Mauro Finetto (ITA)	Delko–Marseille Provence KTM	+ 0"
5	Jonathan Hivert (FRA)	Direct Énergie	+ 0"
6	Romain Hardy (FRA)	Fortuneo–Vital Concept	+ 0"
7	Brent Bookwalter (USA)	BMC Racing Team	+ 0"
8	Lilian Calmejane (FRA)	Direct Énergie	+ 0"
9	Damiano Caruso (ITA)	BMC Racing Team	+ 0"
10	Arnold Jeannesson (FRA)	Fortuneo–Vital Concept	+ 0"

Final general classification
Rank	Rider	Team	Time
1	Arthur Vichot (FRA)	FDJ	9h 06' 49"
2	Julien Simon (FRA)	Cofidis	+ 0"
3	Romain Hardy (FRA)	Fortuneo–Vital Concept	+ 0"
4	Damiano Caruso (ITA)	BMC Racing Team	+ 0"
5	Lilian Calmejane (FRA)	Direct Énergie	+ 0"
6	Mauro Finetto (ITA)	Delko–Marseille Provence KTM	+ 0"
7	Brent Bookwalter (USA)	BMC Racing Team	+ 0"
8	Jonathan Hivert (FRA)	Direct Énergie	+ 0"
9	Arnold Jeannesson (FRA)	Fortuneo–Vital Concept	+ 0"
10	Julien El Fares (FRA)	Delko–Marseille Provence KTM	+ 8"

== Classification leadership table ==
In the 2017 Tour du Haut Var, four different jerseys were awarded. For the general classification, calculated by adding each cyclist's finishing times on each stage, the leader received a yellow jersey. This classification was considered the most important of the 2017 Tour du Haut Var, and the winner of the classification was considered the winner of the race.

Additionally, there was a points classification, which awarded a green jersey. In the points classification, cyclists received points for finishing in the top 15 in a mass-start stage. For winning a stage, a rider earned 25 points, with 20 for second, 16 for third, 14 for fourth, 12 for fifth, 10 for sixth, then 1 point fewer per place down to 1 for 15th place. Points towards the classification could also be accrued at intermediate sprint points during each stage. There was also a mountains classification, the leadership of which was marked by a red jersey. In the mountains classification, points were won by reaching the top of a climb before other cyclists, with more points available for the higher-categorised climbs.

The fourth jersey represented the young rider classification, marked by a white jersey. This was decided in the same way as the general classification, but only riders born after 1 January 1993 were eligible to be ranked in the classification. There was also a classification for teams, in which the times of the best three cyclists per team on each stage were added together; the leading team at the end of the race was the team with the lowest total time.

Stage	Winner	General classification	Mountains classification	Points classification	Young rider classification	Team classification
1	Samuel Dumoulin	Samuel Dumoulin	Marco Bernardinetti	Samuel Dumoulin	Tom Bohli	BMC Racing Team
2	Julien Simon	Arthur Vichot	Franck Bonnamour	Arthur Vichot	Tom Bohli	BMC Racing Team
Final		Arthur Vichot	Franck Bonnamour	Arthur Vichot	Tom Bohli	BMC Racing Team
