= Puget =

Puget may refer to:

- Puget (surname)
- Puget, Vaucluse, a commune in France
- Puget, Washington, a community in the United States

== See also ==
- Puget Creek
- Puget Island
- Puget Sound
- Puget-Ville
