= Huget =

Huget is a surname. Huget is one of the names carried to England in the great wave of migration from Normandy following the Norman Conquest in 1066. It is based on the Norman given name Hugh.

Notable people with the surname include:

- Bob Huget (1947–2022), Canadian politician
- Virginia Huget (1899–1991), American comic strip artist and writer
- Wolfgang Huget (born 1977), German golfer
- Yoann Huget (born 1987), French rugby union player

== See also ==
- Puget (surname)
