= 2013 Tour du Haut Var =

Race details
- Dates: 16–17 February 2013
- Stages: 2
- Distance: 359.5 km (223.4 mi)
- Winning time: 9h 00' 28"

Results
	Winner	Arthur Vichot (FRA)
	Second	Lars Boom (NED)
	Third	Laurens ten Dam (NED)

The 2013 Tour du Haut Var was the 45th edition of the Tour du Haut Var cycle race and was held on 16–17 February 2013. The race started in Le Cannet-des-Maures and finished in Draguignan. The race was won by Arthur Vichot.

== General classification ==
Final general classification

Rank	Rider	Time
1	Arthur Vichot (FRA)	9h 00' 28"
2	Lars Boom (NED)	+ 0"
3	Laurens ten Dam (NED)	+ 0"
4	Pierrick Fédrigo (FRA)	+ 4"
5	Thor Hushovd (NOR)	+ 14"
6	Samuel Dumoulin (FRA)	+ 14"
7	Egoitz García (ESP)	+ 14"
8	Justin Jules (FRA)	+ 14"
9	Julien Simon (FRA)	+ 14"
10	Mathieu Drujon (FRA)	+ 14"
