= Tour des Alpes-Maritimes =

French multi-day road cycling race

Race details
- Date: Mid-February
- Region: Var department Provence-Alpes-Côte d'Azur
- English name: Tour of the Haut-Var
- Local name: Tour du Haut-Var (in French)
- Discipline: Road
- Competition: UCI Europe Tour
- Type: Stage race
- Organiser: Association Sportive Seillanaise
- Race director: Moïse Puginier
- Web site: www.nicematin.com/cyclisme/tour-des-alpes-maritimes/

History
- First edition: 1969
- Editions: 57 (as of 2025)
- First winner: Raymond Poulidor (FRA)
- Most wins: Joop Zoetemelk (NED); Arthur Vichot (FRA) (3 wins)
- Most recent: Christian Scaroni (ITA)

The Tour des Alpes-Maritimes, formerly known as the Tour du Haut Var, (English: Tour of the Haut Var) is an early-season two-day road bicycle race in the Var department region in the south of France. Until 2008 it was run as a one-day race, part of the UCI Europe Tour. In 2009, the race transformed to a 2.1 event, raced over two days. Dutchman Joop Zoetemelk and France's Arthur Vichot hold the record with three wins.

The Tour des Alpes-Maritimes is one of several stage races held in the hilly Provence-Alpes-Côte d'Azur region in February, alongside the Étoile de Bessèges, La Méditerranéenne and the Tour La Provence. These early-season races are competed mainly by French teams and are considered preparations for Paris–Nice, the first European World Tour event in March.

== Winners ==
Year	Country	Rider	Team
1969	France	Raymond Poulidor	Mercier–BP–Hutchinson
1970	France	René Grelin	Frimatic–de Gribaldy
1971	France	Désiré Letort	Bic
1972	Belgium	Frans Verbeeck	Watneys–Avia
1973	Netherlands	Joop Zoetemelk	Gitane–Frigécrème
1974	Netherlands	Gerben Karstens	Bic
1975	France	Raymond Delisle	Peugeot–BP–Michelin
1976	Belgium	Frans Verbeeck	IJsboerke–Colnago
1977	France	Bernard Thévenet	Peugeot–Esso–Michelin
1978	Belgium	Freddy Maertens	Flandria–Velda–Lano
1979	Netherlands	Joop Zoetemelk	Miko–Mercier
1980	France	Pascal Simon	Peugeot–Esso–Michelin
1981	France	Jacques Bossis	Peugeot–Esso–Michelin
1982	Ireland	Sean Kelly	Sem–France Loire
1983	Netherlands	Joop Zoetemelk	Coop–Mercier
1984	France	Éric Caritoux	Skil–Reydel
1985	France	Charly Mottet	Renault–Elf
1986	France	Pascal Simon	Peugeot–Shell–Velo Talbot
1987	West Germany	Rolf Gölz	Superconfex–Yoko
1988	Belgium	Luc Roosen	Roland
1989	France	Gérard Rué	Super U–Raleigh–Fiat
1990	France	Luc Leblanc	Castorama
1991	France	Éric Caritoux	RMO
1992	France	Gérard Rué	Castorama
1993	France	Thierry Claveyrolat	GAN
1994	France	Laurent Brochard	Castorama
1995	Italy	Marco Lietti	MG Maglificio–Technogym
1996	Switzerland	Bruno Boscardin	Festina–Lotus
1997	Italy	Rodolfo Massi	Casino
1998	France	Laurent Jalabert	ONCE
1999	Italy	Davide Rebellin	Polti
2000	Italy	Daniele Nardello	Mapei–Quick-Step
2001	Italy	Daniele Nardello	Mapei–Quick-Step
2002	France	Laurent Jalabert	CSC–Tiscali
2003	France	Sylvain Chavanel	Brioches La Boulangère
2004	Netherlands	Marc Lotz	Rabobank
2005	Belgium	Philippe Gilbert	Française des Jeux
2006	No winner original winner Leonardo Bertagnolli was later disqualified		
2007	Italy	Filippo Pozzato	Liquigas
2008	Italy	Davide Rebellin	Gerolsteiner
2009	France	Thomas Voeckler	Bbox Bouygues Telecom
2010	France	Christophe Le Mével	Française des Jeux
2011	France	Thomas Voeckler	Team Europcar
2012	Great Britain	Jonathan Tiernan-Locke	Endura Racing
2013	France	Arthur Vichot	FDJ
2014	Colombia	Carlos Betancur	Ag2r–La Mondiale
2015	Luxembourg	Ben Gastauer	AG2R La Mondiale
2016	France	Arthur Vichot	FDJ
2017	France	Arthur Vichot	FDJ
2018	France	Jonathan Hivert	Direct Énergie
2019	France	Thibaut Pinot	Groupama–FDJ
2020	Colombia	Nairo Quintana	Arkéa–Samsic
2021	Italy	Gianluca Brambilla	Trek–Segafredo
2022	Colombia	Nairo Quintana	Arkéa–Samsic
2023	France	Kévin Vauquelin	Arkéa–Samsic
2024	France	Benoît Cosnefroy	Decathlon–AG2R La Mondiale
2025	Italy	Christian Scaroni	XDS Astana Team
