= Les Mayons =

- Commune
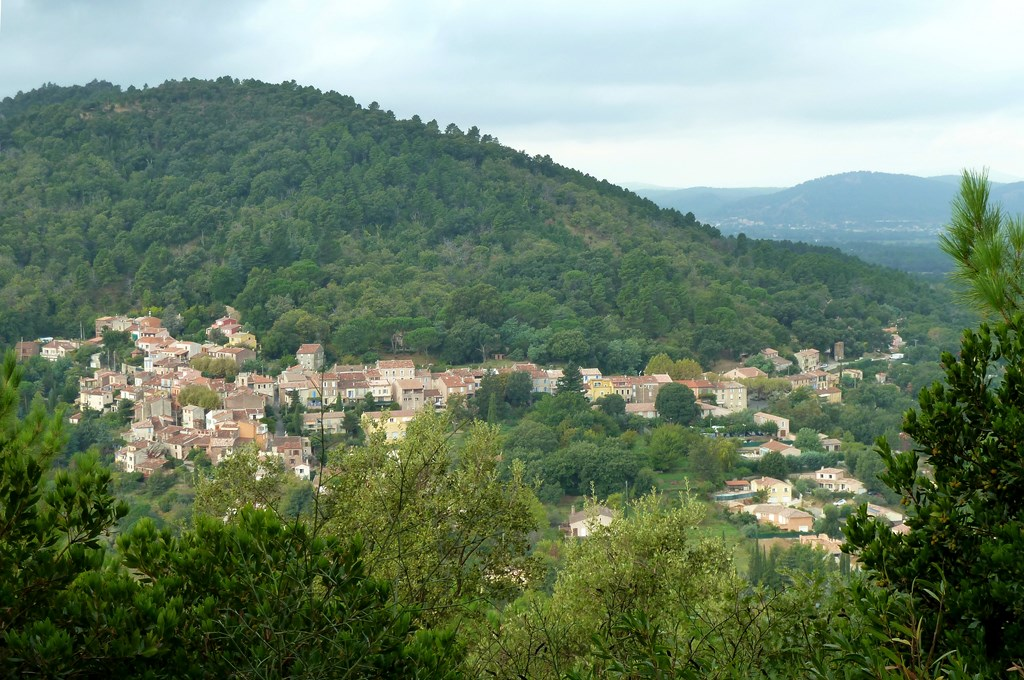
- A general view of Les Mayons

- Coat of arms
- Location of Les Mayons
- Location within France Location within Provence-Alpes-Côte d'Azur
- Coordinates: 43°18′50″N 6°21′31″E
- Country: France
- Region: Provence-Alpes-Côte d'Azur
- Department: Var
- Arrondissement: Brignoles
- Canton: Le Luc
- Intercommunality: Cœur du Var

Government
  - Mayor (2020–2026): Michel Mondani
- Area^{1}: 28.86 km^{2} (11.14 sq mi)
- Elevation: 194 m (636 ft)
- Highest elevation: 742 m (2,434 ft)
- Lowest elevation: 79 m (259 ft)
- Population (2023): 625
  - Density: 21.7/km^{2} (56.1/sq mi)
- Time zone: UTC+01:00 (CET)
  - Summer (DST): UTC+02:00 (CEST)
- INSEE/Postal code: 83075 /83340
- ^{1} French Land Register data, which excludes lakes, ponds, glaciers > 1 km^{2} (0.386 sq mi or 247 acres) and river estuaries.

Les Mayons (French pronunciation: [le majɔ̃]; Occitan: Lei Maions) is a commune in the Var department in the Provence-Alpes-Côte d'Azur region in southeastern France.

It lies approximately 30 km from St Tropez and 10 km from Le Luc.

== See also ==
- Communes of the Var department
