= Yves Bonnamour =

French bicycle racer

Personal information
- Born: 16 July 1961 (age 65) Désertines, Allier, France

Cycling career
- Sport: Cycling
- Current team: Retired
- Discipline: Road
- Role: Rider

Amateur teams
- 1985–1986: UC Sayatoise
- 1992: VS Côte de Granit

Professional teams
- 1988: S.E.F.B.–Tonissteiner–Peugeot
- 1989: Super U–Raleigh–Fiat
- 1990: Castorama

Yves Bonnamour (born 16 July 1961) is a French former professional road cyclist. Professional from 1988 to 1990, he most notably won the 1990 Route du Sud. His son Franck is also a cyclist.

== Major results ==
1984
2nd Grand Prix des Marbriers
1985
1st Stage 2 Circuit des Ardennes
1986
1st Overall Circuit de Saône-et-Loire
1987
4th Overall Tour de l'Avenir
1988
3rd Boucles de l'Aulne
1989
2nd Grand Prix de la Libération (TTT)
1990
1st Overall Route du Sud
1st Stage 2 Tour du Limousin
