= Puget (surname) =

Puget is a surname, and may refer to:

- André Puget (1911-1973), joint chief executive from 1962-67 of the Concorde project
- Hilarion Paul Puget de Barbantane (1754–1828), French general of the French Revolutionary Wars
- Jade Puget (born 1973), guitarist for the alternative rock band AFI
- Janine Puget (1926–2020), Argentine psychiatrist
- Jean-Loup Puget (born 1947), French astrophysicist
- Peter Puget (1765–1822), officer in the Royal Navy, known for his exploration of Puget Sound
- Pierre Paul Puget (1620–1694), French painter, sculptor, architect and engineer

== See also ==
- Puget, Vaucluse department, France
- Puget-sur-Argens, Var department, France
- Puget-Ville, Var department, France
- Puget Sound, Washington state
- Puget Island, Washington state
