= Besse-sur-Issole =

- Commune
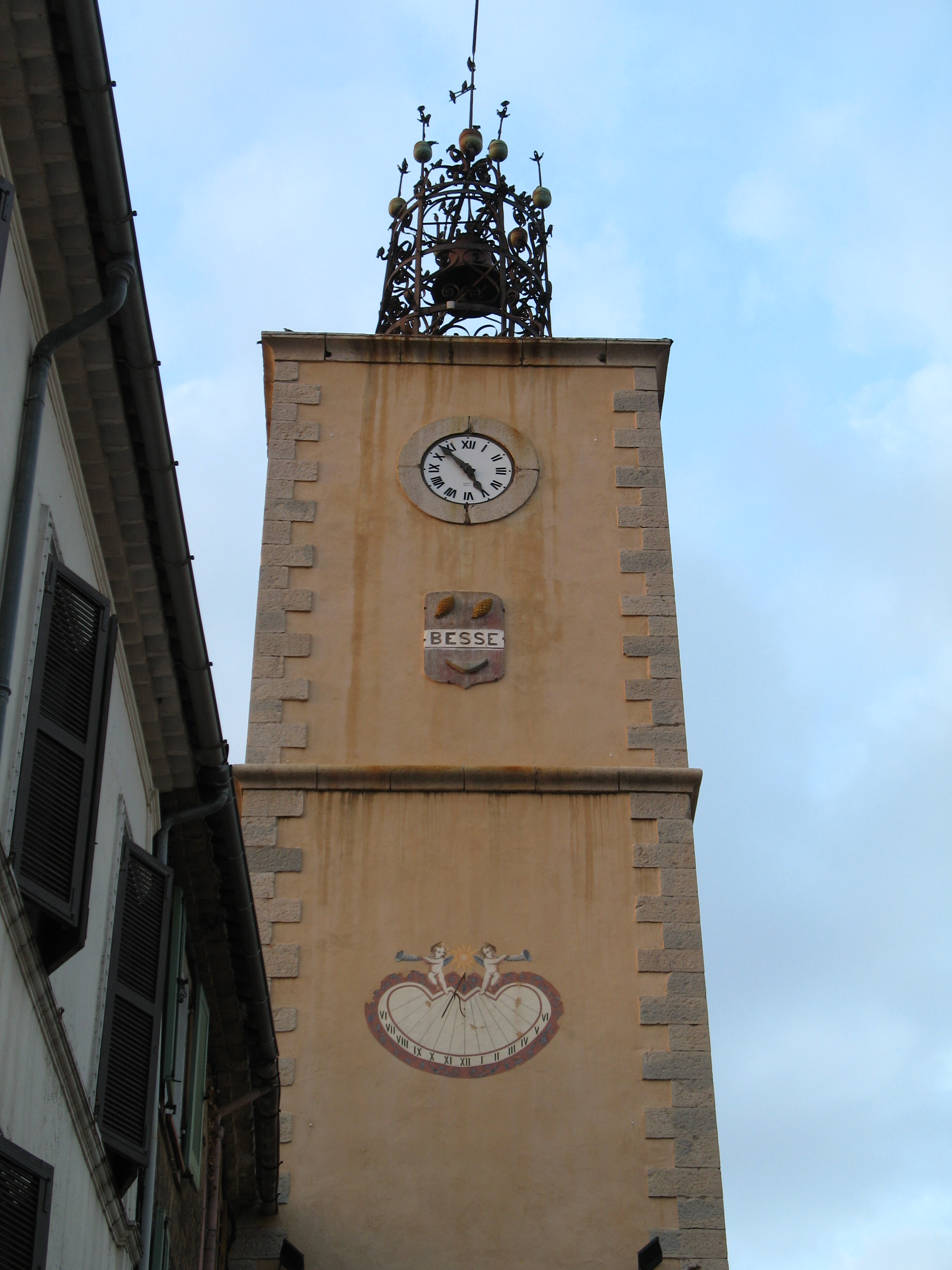
- The belfry of Besse-sur-Issole

- Coat of arms
- Location of Besse-sur-Issole
- Location within France Location within Provence-Alpes-Côte d'Azur
- Coordinates: 43°20′59″N 6°10′38″E
- Country: France
- Region: Provence-Alpes-Côte d'Azur
- Department: Var
- Arrondissement: Brignoles
- Canton: Le Luc
- Intercommunality: Cœur du Var

Government
  - Mayor (2020–2026): Eric Collin
- Area^{1}: 37.19 km^{2} (14.36 sq mi)
- Elevation: 258 m (846 ft)
- Highest elevation: 637 m (2,090 ft)
- Lowest elevation: 230 m (750 ft)
- Population (2023): 3,125
  - Density: 84.03/km^{2} (217.6/sq mi)
- Time zone: UTC+01:00 (CET)
  - Summer (DST): UTC+02:00 (CEST)
- INSEE/Postal code: 83018 /83890
- ^{1} French Land Register data, which excludes lakes, ponds, glaciers > 1 km^{2} (0.386 sq mi or 247 acres) and river estuaries.

Besse-sur-Issole (French pronunciation: [bɛs syʁ isɔl]; Occitan: Bessa d'Issòla) is a commune in the Var department in the Provence-Alpes-Côte d'Azur region in southeastern France.

== Population ==
Historical population
Year	Pop.	±% p.a.
1968	821	—
1975	756	−1.17%
1982	1,040	+4.66%
1990	1,342	+3.24%
1999	1,779	+3.18%
2007	2,721	+5.46%
2012	3,025	+2.14%
2017	3,039	+0.09%
2023	3,125	+0.47%
Source: INSEE

== Notable people ==
- Louis François Auguste Souleyet (1811–1852), zoologist, malacologist, born in Besse-sur-Issole

== See also ==
- Communes of the Var department
