= Pignans =

- Commune
- Coat of arms
- Location of Pignans
- Location within France Location within Provence-Alpes-Côte d'Azur
- Coordinates: 43°18′05″N 6°13′38″E
- Country: France
- Region: Provence-Alpes-Côte d'Azur
- Department: Var
- Arrondissement: Brignoles
- Canton: Le Luc
- Intercommunality: Cœur du Var

Government
  - Mayor (2020–2026): Fernand Brun
- Area^{1}: 34.87 km^{2} (13.46 sq mi)
- Elevation: 171 m (561 ft)
- Highest elevation: 766 m (2,513 ft)
- Lowest elevation: 146 m (479 ft)
- Population (2023): 4,838
  - Density: 138.7/km^{2} (359.3/sq mi)
- Time zone: UTC+01:00 (CET)
  - Summer (DST): UTC+02:00 (CEST)
- INSEE/Postal code: 83092 /83790
- ^{1} French Land Register data, which excludes lakes, ponds, glaciers > 1 km^{2} (0.386 sq mi or 247 acres) and river estuaries.

Pignans (French pronunciation: [piɲɑ̃]; Occitan: Pinhan) is a commune in the Var department in the Côte d'Azur region of southeastern France.

== Population ==
Historical population
Year	Pop.	±% p.a.
1968	1,792	—
1975	1,674	−0.97%
1982	1,789	+0.95%
1990	2,338	+3.40%
1999	2,598	+1.18%
2007	3,115	+2.29%
2012	3,582	+2.83%
2017	4,201	+3.24%
2023	4,838	+2.38%
Source: INSEE

== See also ==
- Communes of the Var department
