= Canton of Le Luc =

Coordinates: 43.40°N 6.31°E

The canton of Le Luc is an administrative division of the Var department, southeastern France. Its borders were modified at the French canton reorganisation which came into effect in March 2015. Its seat is in Le Luc.

It consists of the following communes:

1. Besse-sur-Issole
2. Cabasse
3. Le Cannet-des-Maures
4. Collobrières
5. Flassans-sur-Issole
6. La Garde-Freinet
7. Gonfaron
8. Le Luc
9. Les Mayons
10. Pignans
11. Le Thoronet
