= Mikaël Cherel =

French road bicycle racer

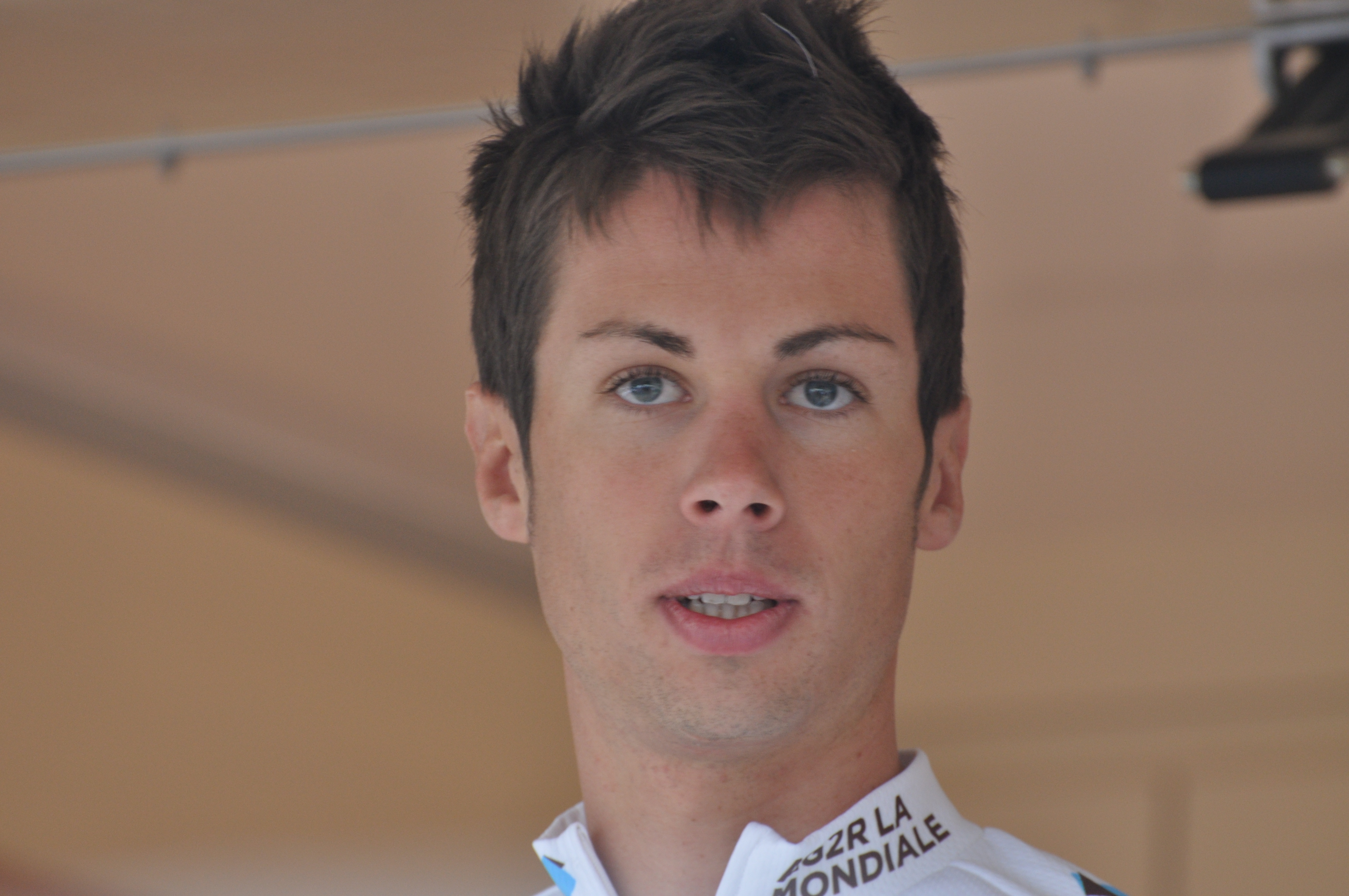
- Cherel in 2012

Personal information
- Full name: Mikaël Cherel
- Born: 17 March 1986 (age 40) Saint-Hilaire-du-Harcouët, France
- Height: 1.83 m (6 ft 0 in)
- Weight: 65 kg (143 lb; 10 st 3 lb)

Cycling career
- Sport: Cycling
- Current team: Retired
- Discipline: Road
- Role: Rider
- Rider type: Climber; Puncheur

Amateur teams
- 2004: VC Saint-Hilaire-du-Harcouët Junior
- 2005–2006: Côtes d'Armor–Maître Jacques

Professional teams
- 2007–2010: Française des Jeux
- 2011–2023: Ag2r–La Mondiale

Mikaël Cherel (born 17 March 1986) is a French former professional road bicycle racer, who competed as a professional from 2007 to 2023.

== Major results ==
2003
1st Road race, National Junior Road Championships
8th Road race, UCI Junior Road World Championships
8th Overall Giro della Toscana Juniores
2004
1st Overall Trophée Centre Morbihan
3rd Overall Giro della Toscana Juniores
4th Overall Tour du Pays de Vaud
6th Overall Liège–La Gleize
6th Overall Grand Prix Rüebliland
2005
10th Liège–Bastogne–Liège Espoirs
2008
10th Overall La Tropicale Amissa Bongo
10th Overall Paris–Corrèze
2009
10th Overall Tour Down Under
2010
5th Overall Paris–Corrèze
2011
5th Polynormande
9th Overall Tour du Limousin
2012
8th Grand Prix d'Ouverture La Marseillaise
2013
5th Polynormande
8th Coppa Sabatini
2014
6th Overall Tour du Haut Var
6th La Drôme Classic
8th Boucles de l'Aulne
10th Overall Tour of Beijing
2016
4th Overall La Méditerranéenne
6th Overall Tour du Haut Var
2017
6th Grand Prix d'Ouverture La Marseillaise

=== Grand Tour general classification results timeline ===
Grand Tour	2008	2009	2010	2011	2012	2013	2014	2015	2016	2017	2018	2019	2020	2021	2022	2023
Giro d'Italia	DNF	—	—	62	—	—	—	—	—	—	DNF	—	—	—	23	DNF
Tour de France	—	—	—	—	62	—	59	18	57	—	—	34	26	—	DNF	—
/ Vuelta a España	—	25	62	—	—	56	—	51	—	—	97	—	—	45	—	56

Legend
—	Did not compete
DNF	Did not finish
IP	In progress
