= Gonfaron =

- Commune
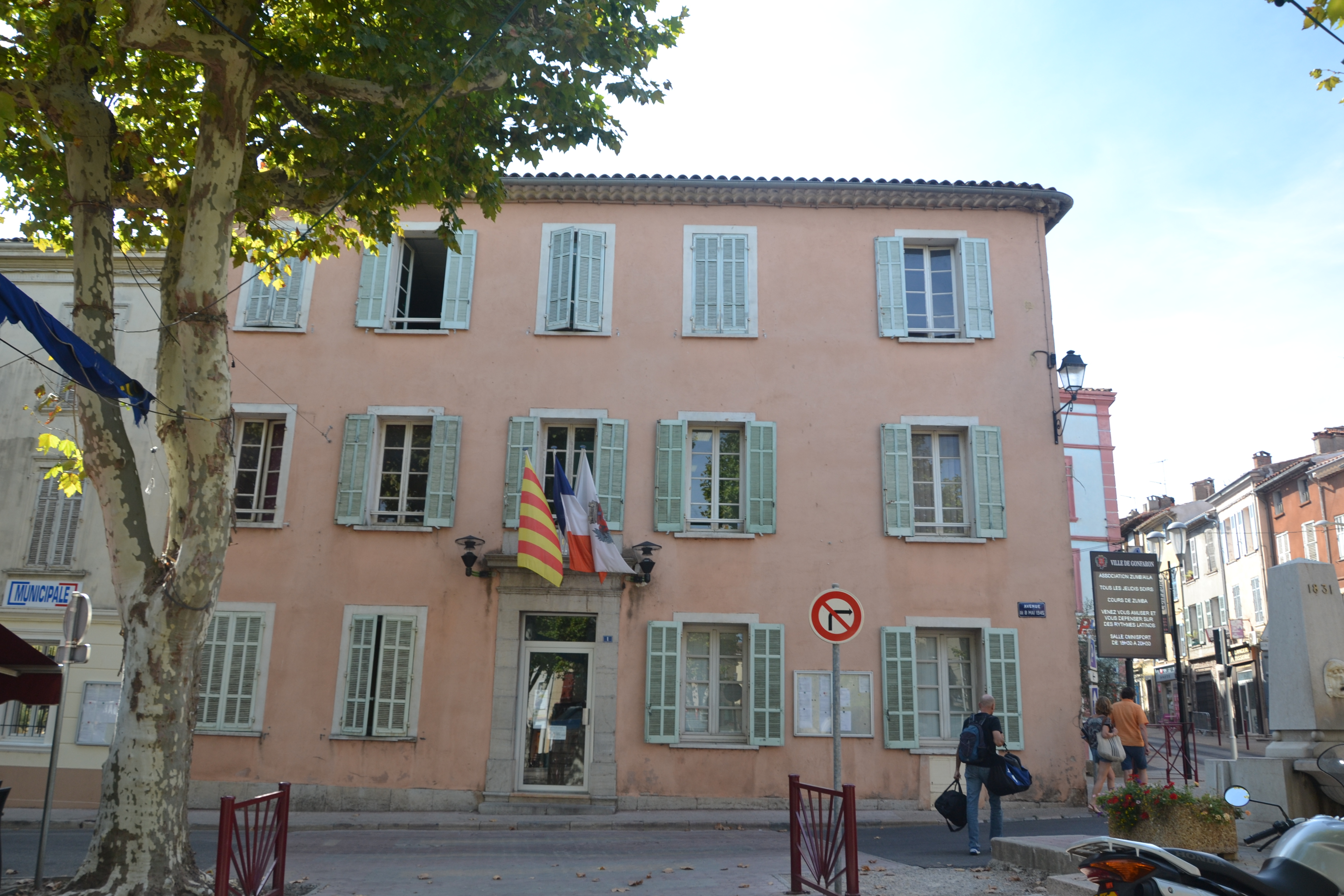
- Gonfaron Town Hall

- Coat of arms
- Location of Gonfaron
- Location within France Location within Provence-Alpes-Côte d'Azur
- Coordinates: 43°19′17″N 6°17′23″E
- Country: France
- Region: Provence-Alpes-Côte d'Azur
- Department: Var
- Arrondissement: Brignoles
- Canton: Le Luc
- Intercommunality: Cœur du Var

Government
  - Mayor (2020–2026): Thierry Bongiorno
- Area^{1}: 40.42 km^{2} (15.61 sq mi)
- Elevation: 180 m (590 ft)
- Highest elevation: 766 m (2,513 ft)
- Lowest elevation: 98 m (322 ft)
- Population (2023): 4,496
  - Density: 111.2/km^{2} (288.1/sq mi)
- Time zone: UTC+01:00 (CET)
  - Summer (DST): UTC+02:00 (CEST)
- INSEE/Postal code: 83067 /83590
- ^{1} French Land Register data, which excludes lakes, ponds, glaciers > 1 km^{2} (0.386 sq mi or 247 acres) and river estuaries.

Gonfaron (French pronunciation: [ɡɔ̃faʁɔ̃]) is a commune in the Var department in the Provence-Alpes-Côte d'Azur region, Southeastern France.

Its detached clock tower is topped with an unusual decorative wrought iron frame housing a bell. Gonfaron is the home of Village des tortues, a rescue and breeding centre for tortoises.

It is served by Gonfaron Station on the Marseille–Ventimiglia railway.

Motor racing team Automobiles Gonfaronnaises Sportives was based in the town; it competed in Formula One from 1986 to 1991.

== Population ==
Historical population
Year	Pop.	±% p.a.
1968	2,133	—
1975	2,308	+1.13%
1982	2,277	−0.19%
1990	2,566	+1.50%
1999	2,805	+0.99%
2007	3,844	+4.02%
2012	4,244	+2.00%
2017	4,318	+0.35%
2023	4,496	+0.68%
Source: INSEE

== See also ==
- Communes of the Var department
