= Franck Bonnamour =

French cyclist (born 1995)

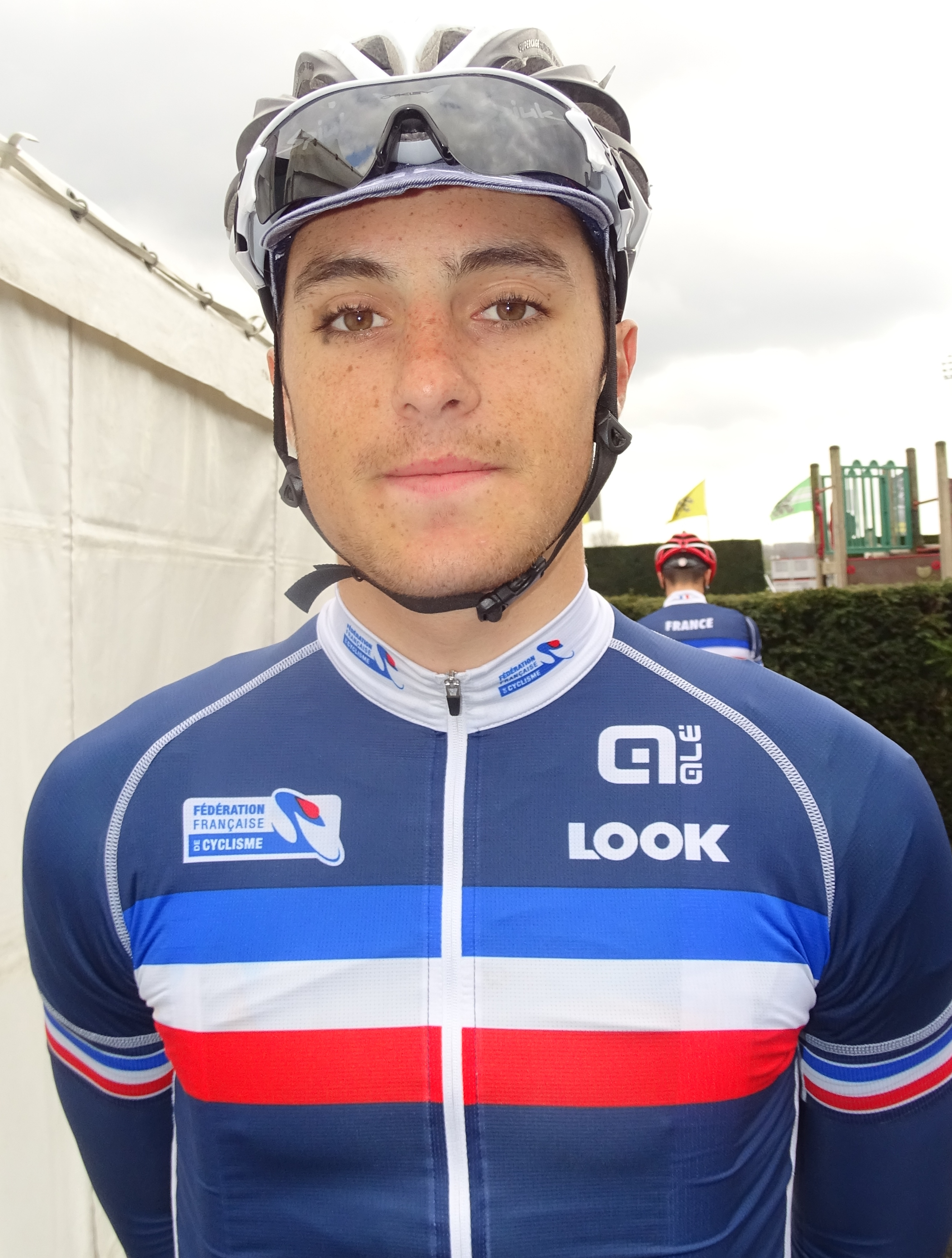
- Bonnamour in 2015

Personal information
- Full name: Franck Bonnamour
- Born: 20 June 1995 (age 31) Lannion, France
- Height: 1.8 m (5 ft 11 in)
- Weight: 70 kg (154 lb)

Cycling career
- Sport: Cycling
- Discipline: Road
- Role: Rider

Amateur team
- 2014–2015: BIC 2000

Professional teams
- 2014: Bretagne–Séché Environnement (stagiaire)
- 2015: Bretagne–Séché Environnement (stagiaire)
- 2016–2020: Fortuneo–Vital Concept
- 2021–2022: B&B Hotels p/b KTM
- 2023–2024: AG2R Citroën Team

Major wins
- Grand Tours Tour de France Combativity award (2021)

Franck Bonnamour (born 20 June 1995) is a French former cyclist, who competed as a professional from 2016 to 2024. His father, Yves Bonnamour, was also a professional cyclist. He rode and completed his first grand tour in the 2021 Tour de France, in which he placed 22nd overall was given the overall combativity award, despite not having been awarded any individual stage combativity award.

In March 2024, Bonnamour was dismissed from his Decathlon-AG2R La Mondiale team after being provisionally suspended for abnormalities in his Athlete biological passport detected in 2022. In August 2025 the UCI Anti-Doping Tribunal issued Bonnamour with a four-year ban backdated to February 2024 for the anti-doping rule violation. Bonnamour had announced his retirement from professional cycling in November 2024 during the investigation.

== Major results ==
2012
2nd Overall Liège–La Gleize

1st Young rider classification
1st Stage 1

2013
1st Road race, UEC European Junior Road Championships
5th Overall Giro di Basilicata
2014
8th Overall Tour de Bretagne
2015
2nd Road race, National Under-23 Road Championships
5th Ronde van Vlaanderen Beloften
8th Grand Prix de Wallonie
2017
1st Mountains classification, Tour du Haut Var
9th Tour du Finistère
10th Grand Prix de Plumelec-Morbihan
2018
8th Famenne Ardenne Classic
8th Tour de Vendée
2019
2nd Tour du Doubs
8th Overall Kreiz Breizh Elites
2020
10th Grand Prix de la Ville de Lillers
2021
2nd Overall Tour du Limousin
2nd Paris–Tours
6th Bretagne Classic
7th Overall Tour Poitou-Charentes en Nouvelle-Aquitaine
8th Tour du Jura
9th Paris–Camembert
10th Trofeo Serra de Tramuntana
Combativity award Overall Tour de France
2022
1st Polynormande
7th Classic Loire Atlantique
2023
6th Grand Prix de Wallonie

=== Grand Tour general classification results timeline ===
Grand Tour	2021	2022
Giro d'Italia	—	—
Tour de France	22	65
Vuelta a España	—	—

Legend
—	Did not compete
DNF	Did not finish
