= Le Thoronet =

- Commune
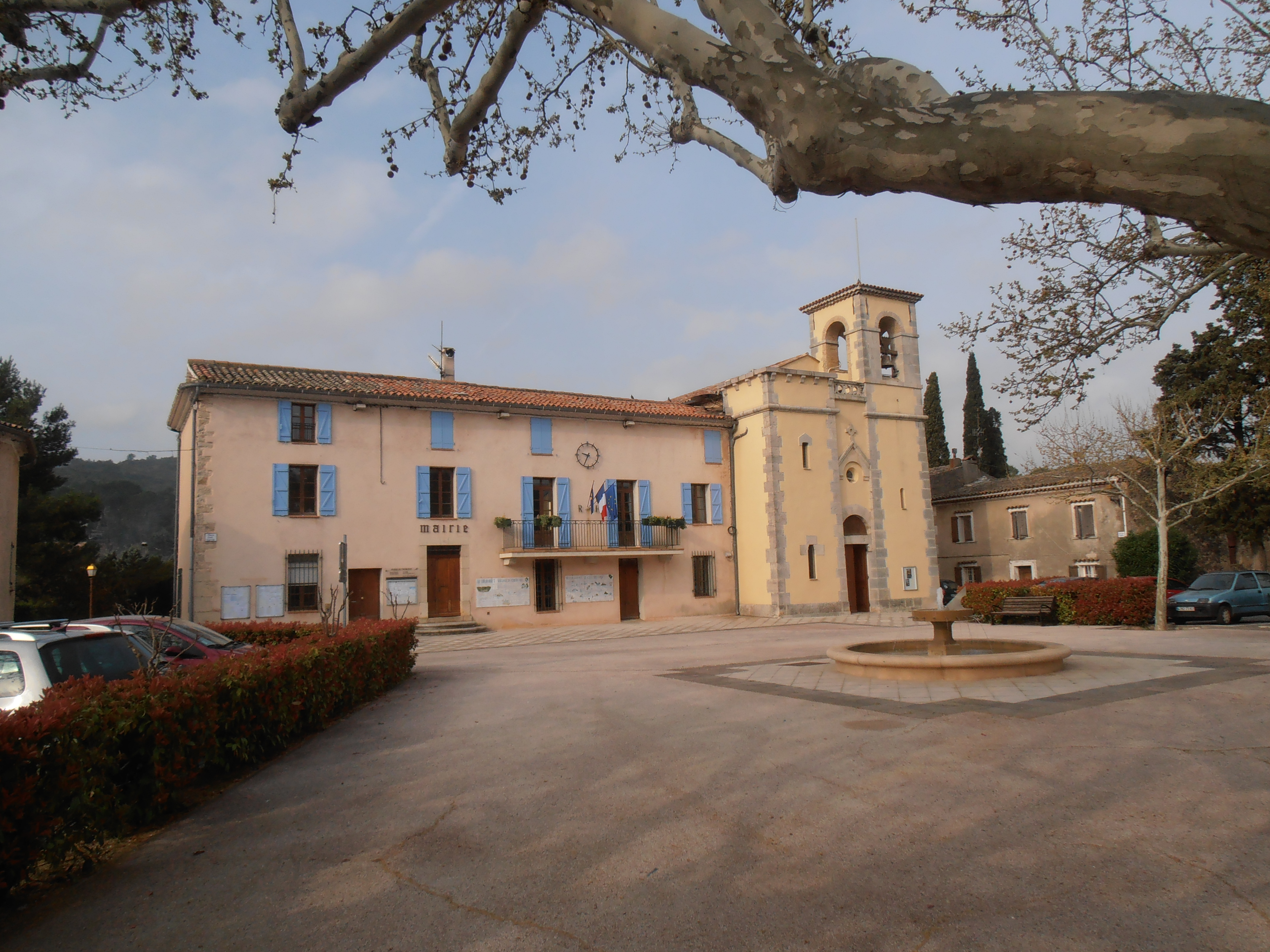
- The town hall, church and village square

- Coat of arms
- Location of Le Thoronet
- Location within France Location within Provence-Alpes-Côte d'Azur
- Coordinates: 43°27′10″N 6°18′16″E
- Country: France
- Region: Provence-Alpes-Côte d'Azur
- Department: Var
- Arrondissement: Brignoles
- Canton: Le Luc
- Intercommunality: Cœur du Var

Government
  - Mayor (2020–2026): Marjorie Viort
- Area^{1}: 37.53 km^{2} (14.49 sq mi)
- Elevation: 180 m (590 ft)
- Highest elevation: 444 m (1,457 ft)
- Lowest elevation: 75 m (246 ft)
- Population (2023): 2,631
  - Density: 70.10/km^{2} (181.6/sq mi)
- Time zone: UTC+01:00 (CET)
  - Summer (DST): UTC+02:00 (CEST)
- INSEE/Postal code: 83136 /83340
- ^{1} French Land Register data, which excludes lakes, ponds, glaciers > 1 km^{2} (0.386 sq mi or 247 acres) and river estuaries.

Le Thoronet (French pronunciation: [lə tɔʁɔnɛ]; Occitan: Lo Toronet) is a commune in the Var department in the Provence-Alpes-Côte d'Azur region in southeastern France.

It is known for the romanesque Le Thoronet Abbey, built in the 12th and 13th century.

== Population ==
Historical population
Year	Pop.	±% p.a.
1968	549	—
1975	575	+0.66%
1982	819	+5.18%
1990	1,163	+4.48%
1999	1,533	+3.12%
2007	2,061	+3.77%
2012	2,373	+2.86%
2017	2,462	+0.74%
2023	2,631	+1.11%
Source: INSEE

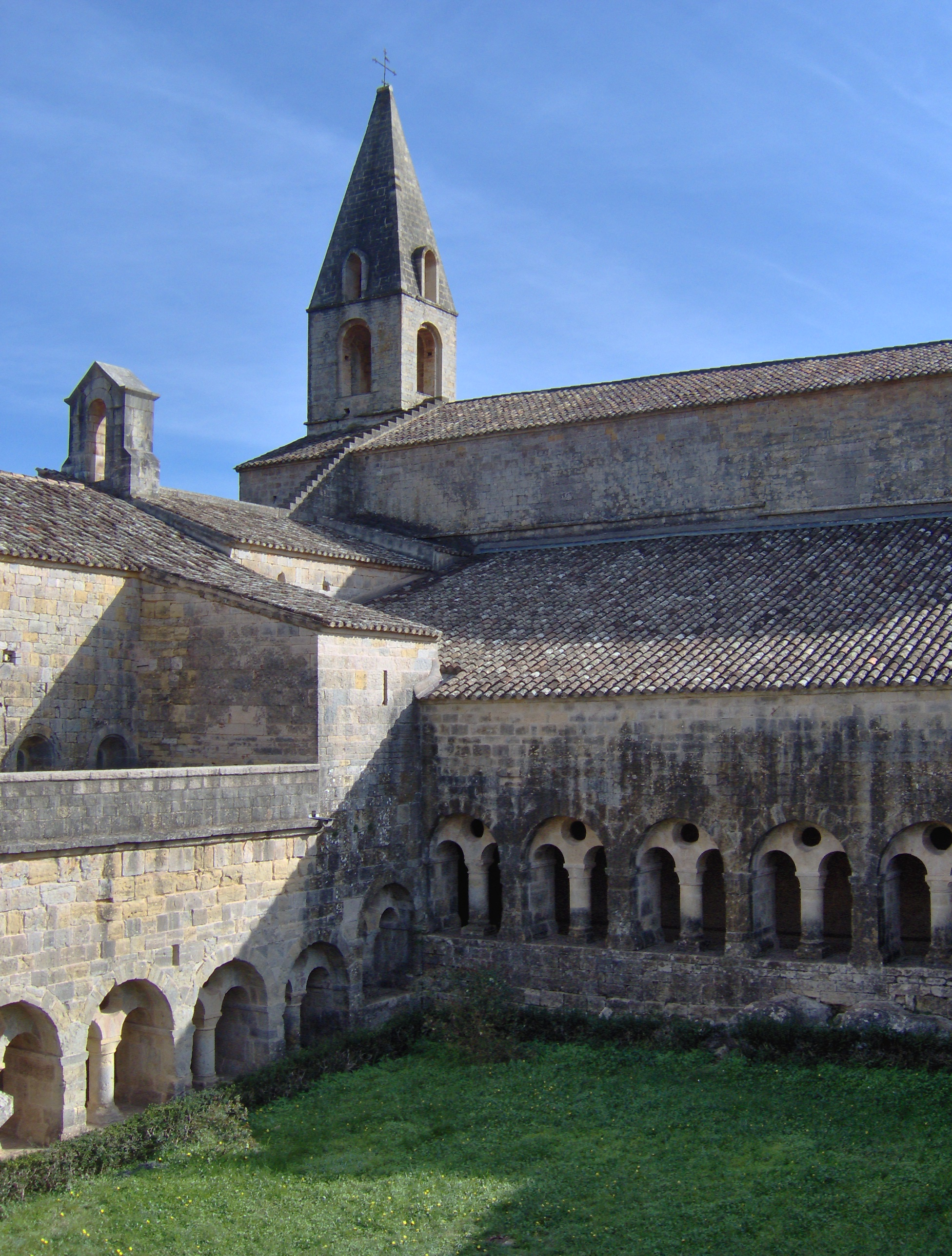
Le Thoronet Abbey

== See also ==
- Communes of the Var department
