= Cabasse, Var =

Cabasse
- Commune
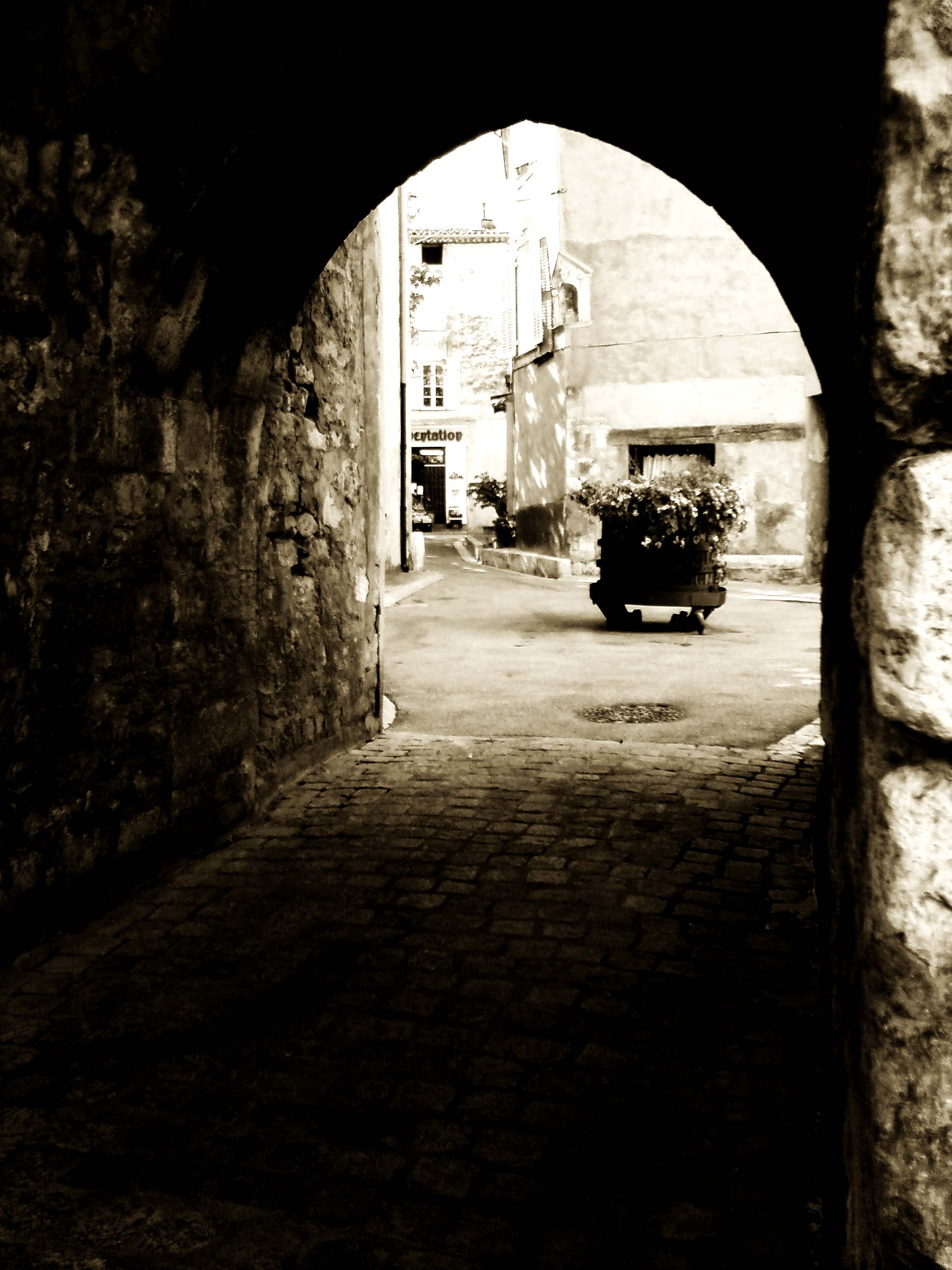
- A view of a street in Cabasse

- Coat of arms
- Location of Cabasse
- Location within France Location within Provence-Alpes-Côte d'Azur
- Coordinates: 43°25′37″N 6°13′21″E
- Country: France
- Region: Provence-Alpes-Côte d'Azur
- Department: Var
- Arrondissement: Brignoles
- Canton: Le Luc
- Intercommunality: Cœur du Var

Government
  - Mayor (2020–2026): Yannick Simon
- Area^{1}: 45.49 km^{2} (17.56 sq mi)
- Elevation: 290 m (950 ft)
- Highest elevation: 404 m (1,325 ft)
- Lowest elevation: 162 m (531 ft)
- Population (2023): 2,020
  - Density: 44.4/km^{2} (115/sq mi)
- Time zone: UTC+01:00 (CET)
  - Summer (DST): UTC+02:00 (CEST)
- INSEE/Postal code: 83026 /83340
- ^{1} French Land Register data, which excludes lakes, ponds, glaciers > 1 km^{2} (0.386 sq mi or 247 acres) and river estuaries.

Cabasse (French pronunciation: [kabas]; Occitan: Cabaça) is a commune in the Var department in the Provence-Alpes-Côte d'Azur region in southeastern France.

== Population ==
Historical population
Year	Pop.	±% p.a.
1968	905	—
1975	802	−1.71%
1982	786	−0.29%
1990	1,182	+5.23%
1999	1,283	+0.92%
2007	1,769	+4.10%
2012	1,949	+1.96%
2017	1,947	−0.02%
2023	2,020	+0.62%
Source: INSEE

== See also ==
- Communes of the Var department
