= 2016 Tour du Haut Var =

2016 UCI Europe Tour

Race details
- Dates: 20–21 February 2016
- Stages: 2
- Distance: 359.8 km (223.6 mi)
- Winning time: 9h 08' 14"

Results
Jersey awarded to the overall winner	Winner	Arthur Vichot (France)	(FDJ)
	Second	Jesús Herrada (Spain)	(Movistar Team)
	Third	Diego Ulissi (Italy)	(Lampre–Merida)
Jersey awarded to the points classification winner	Points	Arthur Vichot (France)	(FDJ)
Jersey awarded to the mountains classification winner	Mountains	Ben Gastauer (Luxembourg)	(AG2R La Mondiale)
Jersey awarded to the youth classification winner	Youth	Petr Vakoč (Czech Republic)	(Etixx–Quick-Step)
	Team	Movistar Team	

The 2016 Tour du Haut Var was a road cycling stage race that took place on 20 and 21 February 2016. The race was rated as a 2.1 event as part of the 2016 UCI Europe Tour, and was the 48th edition of the Tour du Haut Var.

The overall race victory was decided upon cumulative stage finishes, after ten riders finished both stages in the same time; with a stage win and a second-place finish, French cyclist Arthur Vichot took honours in both the general classification and the points classification for the FDJ team. Second place in the overall standings went to Jesús Herrada (Movistar Team) with finishes of fourth and second, while the podium was completed by Lampre–Merida's Diego Ulissi, with finishes of fifth and sixth. Finishing fifth overall, Petr Vakoč won the young rider classification for Etixx–Quick-Step. 2015 race winner Ben Gastauer (AG2R La Mondiale) won the mountains classification, while the teams classification was won by the Movistar Team.

== Teams ==
Nineteen teams were invited to start the race. These included eight UCI WorldTeams, six UCI Professional Continental teams and five UCI Continental teams.

UCI WorldTeams

- AG2R La Mondiale
- BMC Racing Team
- Etixx–Quick-Step
- FDJ
- Team Katusha
- Lampre–Merida
- Movistar Team
- Cannondale

UCI Professional Continental teams

- Androni Giocattoli–Sidermec
- Cofidis
- Delko–Marseille Provence KTM
- Direct Énergie
- Fortuneo–Vital Concept
- Wanty–Groupe Gobert

UCI Continental teams

- Armée de Terre
- HP BTP–Auber93
- Roubaix–Métropole Européenne de Lille
- Verandas Willems
- Wallonie-Bruxelles–Group Protect

== Route ==
Stage schedule
Stage	Date	Route	Distance	Type	Winner
1	20 February	Le Cannet-des-Maures to Bagnols-en-Forêt	153 km (95 mi)	Hilly stage	Tom-Jelte Slagter (NED)
2	21 February	Draguignan to Draguignan	206.8 km (128 mi)	Hilly stage	Arthur Vichot (FRA)

== Stages ==
=== Stage 1 ===
20 February 2016 — Le Cannet-des-Maures to Bagnols-en-Forêt, 153 km (95 mi)

Result of Stage 1 & General classification after Stage 1
Rank	Rider	Team	Time
1	Tom-Jelte Slagter (NED)	Cannondale	3h 53' 03"
2	Arthur Vichot (FRA)	FDJ	+ 0"
3	Mikaël Cherel (FRA)	AG2R La Mondiale	+ 0"
4	Jesús Herrada (ESP)	Movistar Team	+ 0"
5	Julien Simon (FRA)	Cofidis	+ 0"
6	Diego Ulissi (ITA)	Lampre–Merida	+ 0"
7	Francesco Gavazzi (ITA)	Androni Giocattoli–Sidermec	+ 0"
8	Alexey Tsatevich (RUS)	Team Katusha	+ 0"
9	Petr Vakoč (CZE)	Etixx–Quick-Step	+ 0"
10	Patrick Bevin (NZL)	Cannondale	+ 0"

=== Stage 2 ===
21 February 2016 — Draguignan to Draguignan, 206.8 km (128 mi)

Result of Stage 2
Rank	Rider	Team	Time
1	Arthur Vichot (FRA)	FDJ	5h 15' 11"
2	Jesús Herrada (ESP)	Movistar Team	+ 0"
3	Alexis Vuillermoz (FRA)	AG2R La Mondiale	+ 0"
4	Petr Vakoč (CZE)	Etixx–Quick-Step	+ 0"
5	Diego Ulissi (ITA)	Lampre–Merida	+ 0"
6	Angelo Tulik (FRA)	Direct Énergie	+ 0"
7	Julien Simon (FRA)	Cofidis	+ 0"
8	Giovanni Visconti (ITA)	Movistar Team	+ 0"
9	Maxime Bouet (FRA)	Etixx–Quick-Step	+ 0"
10	Mikaël Cherel (FRA)	AG2R La Mondiale	+ 0"

Final general classification
Rank	Rider	Team	Time
1	Arthur Vichot (FRA)	FDJ	9h 08' 14"
2	Jesús Herrada (ESP)	Movistar Team	+ 0"
3	Diego Ulissi (ITA)	Lampre–Merida	+ 0"
4	Julien Simon (FRA)	Cofidis	+ 0"
5	Petr Vakoč (CZE)	Etixx–Quick-Step	+ 0"
6	Mikaël Cherel (FRA)	AG2R La Mondiale	+ 0"
7	Francesco Gavazzi (ITA)	Androni Giocattoli–Sidermec	+ 0"
8	Giovanni Visconti (ITA)	Movistar Team	+ 0"
9	Maxime Bouet (FRA)	Etixx–Quick-Step	+ 0"
10	Patrick Bevin (NZL)	Cannondale	+ 0"

== Classification leadership table ==
In the 2016 Tour du Haut Var, four different jerseys were awarded. For the general classification, calculated by adding each cyclist's finishing times on each stage, the leader received a yellow jersey. This classification was considered the most important of the 2016 Tour du Haut Var, and the winner of the classification was considered the winner of the race.

Additionally, there was a points classification, which awarded a green jersey. In the points classification, cyclists received points for finishing in the top 15 in a mass-start stage. For winning a stage, a rider earned 25 points, with 20 for second, 16 for third, 14 for fourth, 12 for fifth, 10 for sixth, then 1 point fewer per place down to 1 for 15th place. Points towards the classification could also be accrued at intermediate sprint points during each stage. There was also a mountains classification, the leadership of which was marked by a red jersey. In the mountains classification, points were won by reaching the top of a climb before other cyclists, with more points available for the higher-categorised climbs.

The fourth jersey represented the young rider classification, marked by a white jersey. This was decided in the same way as the general classification, but only riders born after 1 January 1991 were eligible to be ranked in the classification. There was also a classification for teams, in which the times of the best three cyclists per team on each stage were added together; the leading team at the end of the race was the team with the lowest total time.

Stage	Winner	General classification	Mountains classification	Points classification	Young rider classification	Team classification
1	Tom-Jelte Slagter	Tom-Jelte Slagter	Lilian Calmejane	Tom-Jelte Slagter	Petr Vakoč	Movistar Team
2	Arthur Vichot	Arthur Vichot	Ben Gastauer	Arthur Vichot	Petr Vakoč	Movistar Team
Final		Arthur Vichot	Ben Gastauer	Arthur Vichot	Petr Vakoč	Movistar Team
