= Collobrières =

Collobrières Colobrieras (Occitan)
- Commune
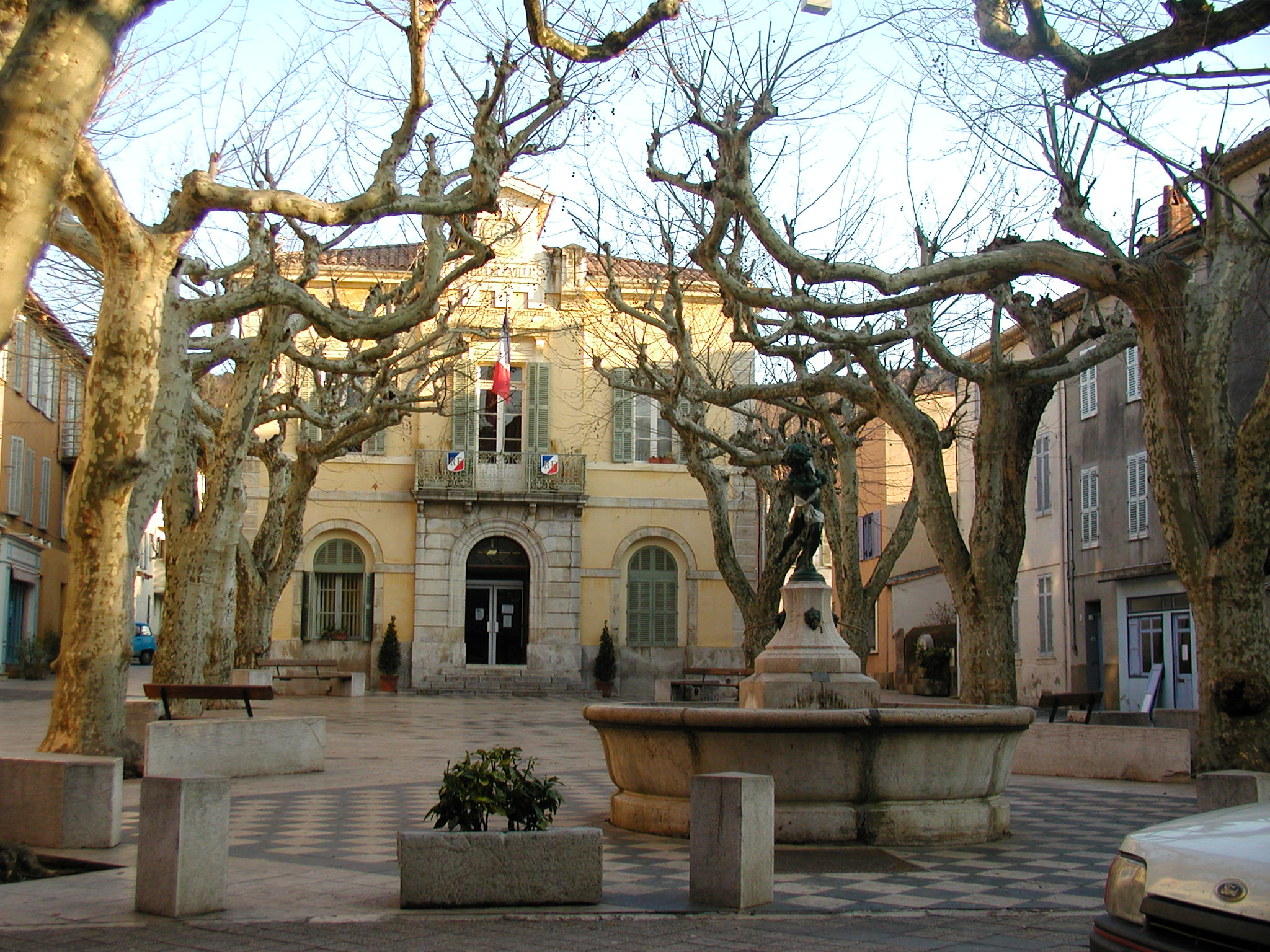
- The Place de la Libération in Collobrières

- Coat of arms
- Location of Collobrières
- Location within France Location within Provence-Alpes-Côte d'Azur
- Coordinates: 43°14′17″N 6°18′35″E
- Country: France
- Region: Provence-Alpes-Côte d'Azur
- Department: Var
- Arrondissement: Toulon
- Canton: Le Luc
- Intercommunality: Communauté de communes Méditerranée Porte des Maures

Government
  - Mayor (2020–2026): Christine Amrane (UDI)
- Area^{1}: 112.68 km^{2} (43.51 sq mi)
- Elevation: 131 m (430 ft)
- Highest elevation: 776 m (2,546 ft)
- Lowest elevation: 58 m (190 ft)
- Population (2023): 1,870
  - Density: 16.6/km^{2} (43.0/sq mi)
- Time zone: UTC+01:00 (CET)
  - Summer (DST): UTC+02:00 (CEST)
- INSEE/Postal code: 83043 /83610
- ^{1} French Land Register data, which excludes lakes, ponds, glaciers > 1 km^{2} (0.386 sq mi or 247 acres) and river estuaries.

Collobrières (French pronunciation: [kɔlɔbʁijɛʁ]; Occitan: Colobrieras) is a commune in the Var department in the Provence-Alpes-Côte d'Azur region in Southeastern France. As of 2023, the population of the commune was 1,870.

== Geography ==
=== Climate ===
Collobrières has a hot-summer Mediterranean climate (Köppen climate classification Csa). The average annual temperature in Collobrières is 14.6 °C (58.3 °F). The average annual rainfall is 822.8 mm (32.39 in) with November as the wettest month. The temperatures are highest on average in July, at around 23.2 °C (73.8 °F), and lowest in January, at around 7.3 °C (45.1 °F). The highest temperature ever recorded in Collobrières was 39.9 °C (103.8 °F) on 5 August 2017; the coldest temperature ever recorded was −9.6 °C (14.7 °F) on 13 February 1999.

Climate data for Collobrières (1991−2020 normals, extremes 1991−present)
Month	Jan	Feb	Mar	Apr	May	Jun	Jul	Aug	Sep	Oct	Nov	Dec	Year
Record high °C (°F)	23.1 (73.6)	24.9 (76.8)	26.6 (79.9)	28.4 (83.1)	35.0 (95.0)	38.4 (101.1)	39.7 (103.5)	39.9 (103.8)	36.1 (97.0)	30.3 (86.5)	24.7 (76.5)	21.6 (70.9)	39.9 (103.8)
Mean daily maximum °C (°F)	12.9 (55.2)	13.8 (56.8)	16.5 (61.7)	19.2 (66.6)	23.5 (74.3)	27.7 (81.9)	31.1 (88.0)	31.2 (88.2)	26.4 (79.5)	21.5 (70.7)	16.4 (61.5)	13.4 (56.1)	21.1 (70.0)
Daily mean °C (°F)	7.3 (45.1)	7.6 (45.7)	10.1 (50.2)	12.7 (54.9)	16.7 (62.1)	20.3 (68.5)	23.2 (73.8)	23.2 (73.8)	19.3 (66.7)	15.5 (59.9)	10.9 (51.6)	8.1 (46.6)	14.6 (58.3)
Mean daily minimum °C (°F)	1.8 (35.2)	1.5 (34.7)	3.6 (38.5)	6.3 (43.3)	9.8 (49.6)	13.0 (55.4)	15.3 (59.5)	15.2 (59.4)	12.2 (54.0)	9.6 (49.3)	5.4 (41.7)	2.7 (36.9)	8.0 (46.4)
Record low °C (°F)	−9.6 (14.7)	−9.6 (14.7)	−9.3 (15.3)	−3.7 (25.3)	0.8 (33.4)	3.7 (38.7)	7.3 (45.1)	6.5 (43.7)	2.0 (35.6)	−3.4 (25.9)	−9.1 (15.6)	−9.3 (15.3)	−9.6 (14.7)
Average precipitation mm (inches)	97.9 (3.85)	60.6 (2.39)	59.8 (2.35)	66.7 (2.63)	47.1 (1.85)	40.1 (1.58)	12.2 (0.48)	17.8 (0.70)	78.4 (3.09)	107.8 (4.24)	143.1 (5.63)	91.3 (3.59)	822.8 (32.39)
Average precipitation days (≥ 1.0 mm)	6.2	5.2	5.4	6.3	4.8	3.6	1.4	2.4	4.9	7.2	8.3	6.5	62.1
Source: Météo-France

== Main exports ==
Collobrières main exports are edible chestnuts which are made into things like marron glacé and ice cream. They also grow trees for cork production.

== Currency ==
Collobrières uses the Euro, since it is part of France. But since 2008, the french franc was introduced back as a side currency, to let people see how much the prices changed, and to cultivate tourism.

== See also ==
- Communes of the Var department
