= Flassans-sur-Issole =

- Commune
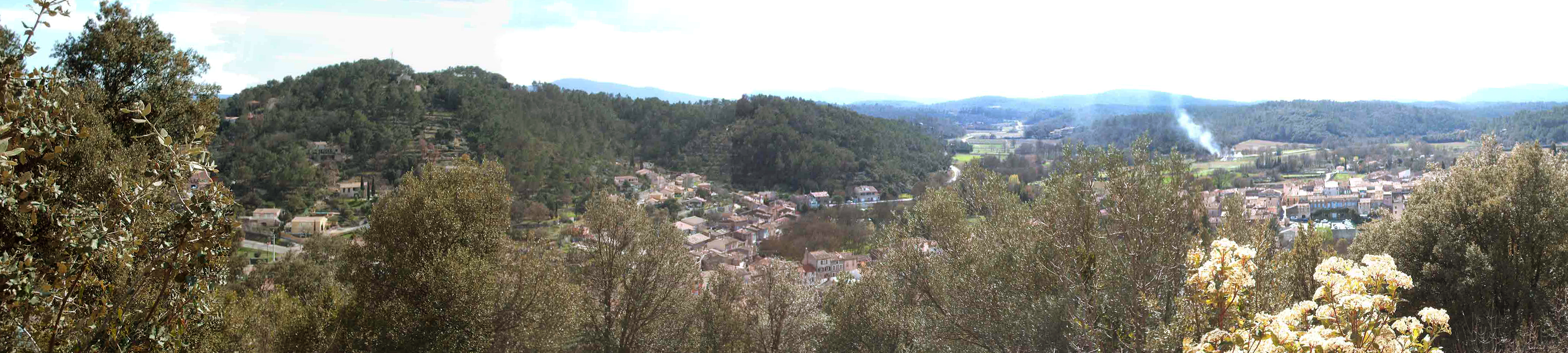
- View of the village

- Coat of arms
- Location of Flassans-sur-Issole
- Location within France Location within Provence-Alpes-Côte d'Azur
- Coordinates: 43°22′08″N 6°13′16″E
- Country: France
- Region: Provence-Alpes-Côte d'Azur
- Department: Var
- Arrondissement: Brignoles
- Canton: Le Luc
- Intercommunality: Cœur du Var

Government
  - Mayor (2020–2026): Jean-Louis Portal
- Area^{1}: 43.68 km^{2} (16.86 sq mi)
- Elevation: 235 m (771 ft)
- Highest elevation: 527 m (1,729 ft)
- Lowest elevation: 203 m (666 ft)
- Population (2023): 3,706
  - Density: 84.84/km^{2} (219.7/sq mi)
- Time zone: UTC+01:00 (CET)
  - Summer (DST): UTC+02:00 (CEST)
- INSEE/Postal code: 83057 /83340
- ^{1} French Land Register data, which excludes lakes, ponds, glaciers > 1 km^{2} (0.386 sq mi or 247 acres) and river estuaries.

Flassans-sur-Issole (French pronunciation: [flasɑ̃ syʁ isɔl]; Occitan: Flassan d'Içòla) is a commune in the Var department in the Provence-Alpes-Côte d'Azur region in southeastern France.

== Population ==
Historical population
Year	Pop.	±% p.a.
1968	962	—
1975	905	−0.87%
1982	1,040	+2.01%
1990	1,501	+4.69%
1999	1,934	+2.86%
2007	2,860	+5.01%
2012	3,229	+2.46%
2017	3,533	+1.82%
2023	3,706	+0.80%
Source: INSEE

== See also ==
- Communes of the Var department
