= Cœur du Var =

Federation of municipalities in France

- Communauté de communes
- Interactive map of Cœur du Var
- Coordinates: 43°23′N 06°19′E
- Country: France
- Region: Provence-Alpes-Côte d'Azur
- Department: Var
- No. of communes: {{{nbcomm}}}
- Established: 2001
- Area: 448.2 km^{2} (173.1 sq mi)
- Population (2018): 43,518
  - Density: 97.10/km^{2} (251.5/sq mi)
- Website: www.coeurduvar.com

The communauté de communes Cœur du Var groups 11 communes of the Var département, in southeastern France. Its seat is in Le Luc. Its area is 448.2 km^{2}, and its population was 43,518 in 2018.

== Composition ==
The communauté de communes consists of the following 11 communes:

1. Besse-sur-Issole
2. Cabasse
3. Le Cannet-des-Maures
4. Carnoules
5. Flassans-sur-Issole
6. Gonfaron
7. Le Luc
8. Les Mayons
9. Pignans
10. Puget-Ville
11. Le Thoronet

== History ==
It was created in January 2002 and replaced the SIVOM of Centre Var.
