= 1991 Tour du Haut Var =

Race details
- Dates: 23 February 1991
- Stages: 1
- Distance: 198 km (123.0 mi)
- Winning time: 5h 23' 50"

Results
	Winner	Éric Caritoux (FRA)
	Second	Etienne De Wilde (BEL)
	Third	Wim Van Eynde (BEL)

The 1991 Tour du Haut Var was the 23rd edition of the Tour du Haut Var cycle race and was held on 23 February 1991. The race started in Sainte-Maxime and finished in Roquebrune-sur-Argens. The race was won by Éric Caritoux.

== General classification ==
Final general classification

Rank	Rider	Time
1	Éric Caritoux (FRA)	5h 23' 50"
2	Etienne De Wilde (BEL)	+ 0"
3	Wim Van Eynde (BEL)	+ 0"
4	Christophe Lavainne (FRA)	+ 0"
5	Dominique Arnould (FRA)	+ 0"
6	Yvon Madiot (FRA)	+ 10"
7	Gérard Rué (FRA)	+ 10"
8	Luc Roosen (BEL)	+ 17"
9	Kai Hundertmarck (GER)	+ 51"
10	Richard Virenque (FRA)	+ 51"
