= Route d'Occitanie =

French multi-day road cycling race

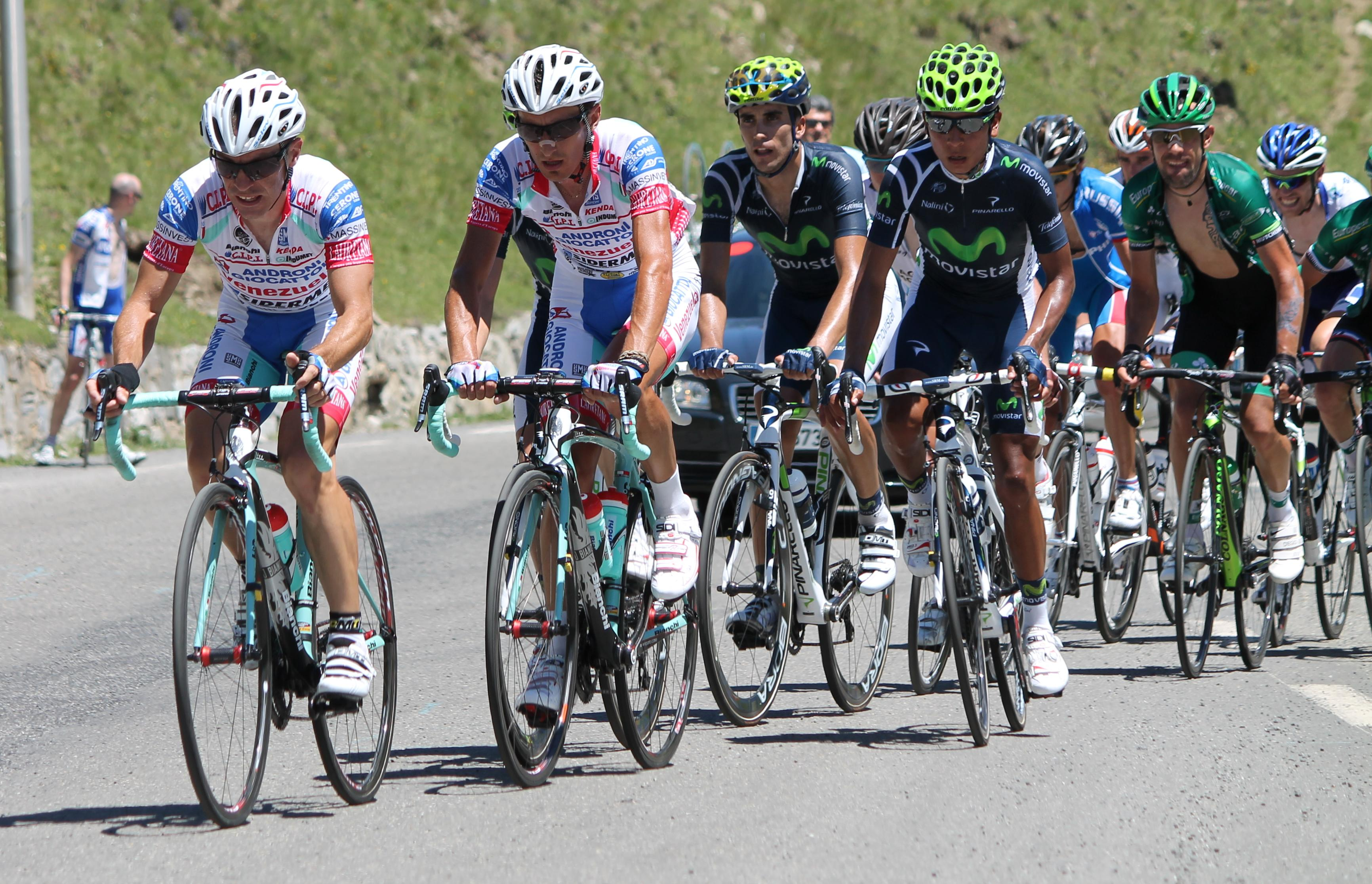

Race details
- Date: Late June
- Region: Southern France
- English name: South Cycling Route (when known as Route du Sud)
- Local name: La Route d'Occitanie Cycliste (in French)
- Discipline: Road
- Competition: UCI Europe Tour
- Type: Stage-race
- Web site: www.laroutedoccitanie.fr

History
- First edition: 1977
- Editions: 49 (as of 2026)
- First winner: Jacques Esclassan (FRA)
- Most wins: Gilbert Duclos-Lassalle (FRA) (3 wins)
- Most recent: Davide Piganzoli (ITA)

The Route d'Occitanie is a road bicycle race with 4 stages held annually in Southern France. It was first held in 1977 and since 2005 it has been organised as a 2.1 event on the UCI Europe Tour. It is usually held a week before the Tour de France.

== Name of the race ==
- 1977 – 1981 : Tour du Tarn
- 1982 – 1987 : Tour Midi-Pyrénées
- 1988 – 2017 : La Route du Sud
- 2018 – : Route d'Occitanie

== Winners ==
Year	Country	Rider	Team
1977	France	Jacques Esclassan	Peugeot–Esso–Michelin
1978	France	Pierre-Raymond Villemiane	Renault–Gitane–Campagnolo
1979	France	Yvon Bertin	Renault–Gitane
1980	France	Gilbert Duclos-Lassalle	Peugeot–Esso–Michelin
1981	France	Jean-René Bernaudeau	Peugeot–Esso–Michelin
1982	Italy	Francesco Moser	Famcucine
1983	France	Gilbert Duclos-Lassalle	Peugeot–Shell–Michelin
1984	France	Pascal Simon	Peugeot–Shell–Michelin
1985	Ireland	Stephen Roche	La Redoute
1986	Switzerland	Niki Rüttimann	La Vie Claire
1987	France	Régis Clère	Teka
1988	France	Ronan Pensec	Z–Peugeot
1989	France	Gilbert Duclos-Lassalle	Z–Peugeot
1990	France	Yves Bonnamour	Castorama
1991	Switzerland	Laurent Dufaux	Helvetia–La Suisse
1992	Lithuania	Artūras Kasputis	Postobón–Manzana–Ryalcao
1993	France	Éric Boyer	GAN
1994	Colombia	Álvaro Mejía	Motorola
1995	Switzerland	Laurent Dufaux	Festina–Lotus
1996	France	Laurent Jalabert	ONCE
1997	Australia	Patrick Jonker	Rabobank
1998	France	Armand de Las Cuevas	Banesto
1999	United States	Jonathan Vaughters	U.S. Postal Service
2000	Poland	Tomasz Brożyna	Banesto
2001	Kazakhstan	Andrey Kivilev	Cofidis
2002	United States	~~Levi Leipheimer~~	~~Rabobank~~
2003	Australia	Michael Rogers	Quick-Step–Davitamon
2004	Australia	Bradley McGee	FDJeux.com
2005	France	Sandy Casar	Française des Jeux
2006	France	Thomas Voeckler	Bouygues Télécom
2007	Spain	Óscar Sevilla	Relax–GAM
2008	Ireland	Dan Martin	Slipstream–Chipotle
2009	Poland	Przemysław Niemiec	Miche–Silver Cross–Selle Italia
2010	France	David Moncoutié	Cofidis
2011	Belarus	Vasil Kiryienka	Movistar Team
2012	Colombia	Nairo Quintana	Movistar Team
2013	France	Thomas Voeckler	Team Europcar
2014	Ireland	Nicolas Roche	Tinkoff–Saxo
2015	Spain	Alberto Contador	Tinkoff–Saxo
2016	Colombia	Nairo Quintana	Movistar Team
2017	Switzerland	Silvan Dillier	BMC Racing Team
2018	Spain	Alejandro Valverde	Movistar Team
2019	Spain	Alejandro Valverde	Movistar Team
2020	Colombia	Egan Bernal	Team INEOS
2021	Spain	Antonio Pedrero	Movistar Team
2022	Canada	Michael Woods	Israel–Premier Tech
2023	Canada	Michael Woods	Israel–Premier Tech
2024	No race		
2025	France	Nicolas Prodhomme	Decathlon–AG2R La Mondiale
2026	Italy	Davide Piganzoli	Visma–Lease a Bike

=== Multiple winners ===
Wins	Rider	Editions
3	Gilbert Duclos-Lassalle (FRA)	1980, 1983, 1989
2	Laurent Dufaux (SUI)	1991, 1995
2	Thomas Voeckler (FRA)	2006, 2013
2	Nairo Quintana (COL)	2012, 2016
2	Alejandro Valverde (ESP)	2018, 2019
2	Michael Woods (CAN)	2022, 2023

=== Wins per country ===
Wins	Country
18	France
5	Spain
4	Colombia, Switzerland
3	Australia, Ireland
2	Poland, Italy
1	Belarus, Canada, Kazakhstan, Lithuania, United States
1	No winner
