= Carnoules =

- Commune
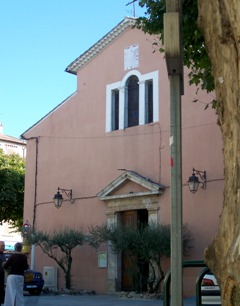
- The church of Our Lady of the Assumption

- Coat of arms
- Location of Carnoules
- Location within France Location within Provence-Alpes-Côte d'Azur
- Coordinates: 43°18′10″N 6°11′21″E
- Country: France
- Region: Provence-Alpes-Côte d'Azur
- Department: Var
- Arrondissement: Brignoles
- Canton: Garéoult
- Intercommunality: Cœur du Var

Government
  - Mayor (2024–2026): Christophe Cortes
- Area^{1}: 25.49 km^{2} (9.84 sq mi)
- Elevation: 202 m (663 ft)
- Highest elevation: 485 m (1,591 ft)
- Lowest elevation: 115 m (377 ft)
- Population (2023): 4,388
  - Density: 172.1/km^{2} (445.9/sq mi)
- Time zone: UTC+01:00 (CET)
  - Summer (DST): UTC+02:00 (CEST)
- INSEE/Postal code: 83033 /83660
- ^{1} French Land Register data, which excludes lakes, ponds, glaciers > 1 km^{2} (0.386 sq mi or 247 acres) and river estuaries.

Carnoules (French pronunciation: [kaʁnul]; Occitan: Carnolas) is a commune in the Var department in the Provence-Alpes-Côte d'Azur region in southeastern France.

== Population ==
Historical population
Year	Pop.	±% p.a.
1968	1,449	—
1975	1,385	−0.64%
1982	1,761	+3.49%
1990	2,292	+3.35%
1999	2,594	+1.38%
2007	3,162	+2.51%
2012	3,385	+1.37%
2017	3,448	+0.37%
2023	4,388	+4.10%
Source: INSEE

== See also ==
- Communes of the Var department
