= Le Luc =

Le Luc Lo Luc (Occitan)
- Commune
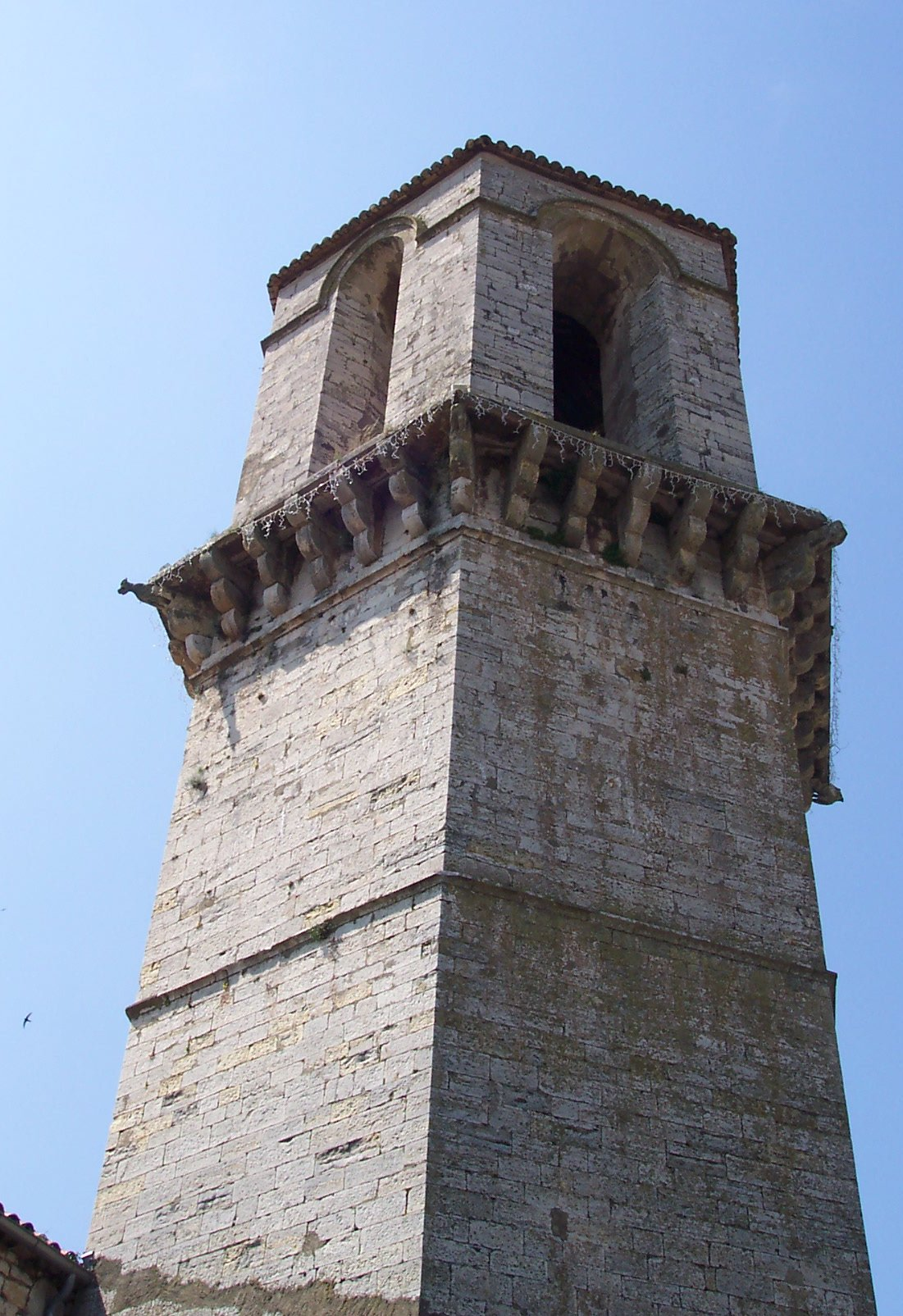
- The hexagonal tower in Le Luc

- Coat of arms
- Location of Le Luc
- Location within France Location within Provence-Alpes-Côte d'Azur
- Coordinates: 43°23′44″N 6°18′48″E
- Country: France
- Region: Provence-Alpes-Côte d'Azur
- Department: Var
- Arrondissement: Brignoles
- Canton: Le Luc
- Intercommunality: Cœur du Var

Government
  - Mayor (2020–2026): Dominique Lain (DVD)
- Area^{1}: 44.16 km^{2} (17.05 sq mi)
- Elevation: 150 m (490 ft)
- Highest elevation: 400 m (1,300 ft)
- Lowest elevation: 79 m (259 ft)
- Population (2023): 11,310
  - Density: 256.1/km^{2} (663.3/sq mi)
- Time zone: UTC+01:00 (CET)
  - Summer (DST): UTC+02:00 (CEST)
- INSEE/Postal code: 83073 /83340
- ^{1} French Land Register data, which excludes lakes, ponds, glaciers > 1 km^{2} (0.386 sq mi or 247 acres) and river estuaries.

Le Luc (French pronunciation: [lə lyk]; Provençal: Lo Luc), also known as Le Luc-en-Provence (Lo Luc de Provença), is a commune in the Var department in the Provence-Alpes-Côte d'Azur region in Southeastern France. Le Luc is the seat of its own canton, the larger canton of Le Luc.

== Climate ==
With an average of about 128 days per year (source: Météo Climat stats, calculated over the period 1981–2010), Le Luc is one of the communes with the highest number of "warm days" in France, that is to say, days for which the maximum temperature is greater than or equal to 25 °C.

As to "hot days", the average is of about 62 days per year (meaning maximum temperature greater or equal to 30 °C). As to "very hot days", the average is of about 9 days per year (meaning maximum temperature greater or equal to 35 °C).

Comparison of local Meteorological data with other cities in France
Town	Sunshine (hours/yr)	Rain (mm/yr)	Snow (days/yr)	Storm (days/yr)	Fog (days/yr)
National average	1,973	770	14	22	40
Le Luc	2,753.2	766.1	1.8	31	39.5
Paris	1,661	637	12	18	10
Nice	2,724	767	1	29	1
Strasbourg	1,693	665	29	29	56
Brest	1,605	1,211	7	12	75

Climate data for Le Luc (1991–2020 averages, extremes 1946–present)
Month	Jan	Feb	Mar	Apr	May	Jun	Jul	Aug	Sep	Oct	Nov	Dec	Year
Record high °C (°F)	22.7 (72.9)	26.1 (79.0)	28.6 (83.5)	30.5 (86.9)	35.8 (96.4)	41.1 (106.0)	42.7 (108.9)	42.2 (108.0)	36.7 (98.1)	33.9 (93.0)	26.1 (79.0)	23.3 (73.9)	42.7 (108.9)
Mean daily maximum °C (°F)	12.9 (55.2)	14.2 (57.6)	17.5 (63.5)	20.2 (68.4)	24.5 (76.1)	29.0 (84.2)	32.4 (90.3)	32.4 (90.3)	27.2 (81.0)	22.0 (71.6)	16.5 (61.7)	13.1 (55.6)	21.8 (71.2)
Daily mean °C (°F)	7.5 (45.5)	8.1 (46.6)	11.0 (51.8)	13.8 (56.8)	17.9 (64.2)	22.0 (71.6)	24.9 (76.8)	24.8 (76.6)	20.4 (68.7)	16.3 (61.3)	11.4 (52.5)	8.0 (46.4)	15.5 (59.9)
Mean daily minimum °C (°F)	2.0 (35.6)	2.1 (35.8)	4.6 (40.3)	7.3 (45.1)	11.3 (52.3)	15.0 (59.0)	17.5 (63.5)	17.3 (63.1)	13.7 (56.7)	10.7 (51.3)	6.2 (43.2)	3.0 (37.4)	9.2 (48.6)
Record low °C (°F)	−12.0 (10.4)	−17.0 (1.4)	−10.0 (14.0)	−3.4 (25.9)	0.0 (32.0)	4.8 (40.6)	7.4 (45.3)	7.0 (44.6)	2.4 (36.3)	−3.4 (25.9)	−9.0 (15.8)	−9.3 (15.3)	−17.0 (1.4)
Average precipitation mm (inches)	72.5 (2.85)	48.1 (1.89)	52.3 (2.06)	67.1 (2.64)	56.4 (2.22)	50.7 (2.00)	16.3 (0.64)	33.7 (1.33)	86.6 (3.41)	128.9 (5.07)	141.0 (5.55)	78.7 (3.10)	832.3 (32.77)
Average precipitation days (≥ 1.0 mm)	5.7	5.1	5.2	7.0	5.7	3.9	1.9	3.1	5.2	7.4	8.5	6.1	64.8
Average snowy days	0.8	0.3	0.1	0.0	0.0	0.0	0.0	0.0	0.0	0.0	0.2	0.2	1.6
Average relative humidity (%)	52	47	42	39	40	37	32	33	41	48	52	53	43
Mean monthly sunshine hours	148.4	165.7	218.1	231.9	275.6	320.2	359.1	324.8	248.9	179.1	143.4	137.2	2,752.4
Source 1: Meteo France
Source 2: Infoclimat.fr (humidity, snowy days 1961–1990)

== Demographics ==
Historical population
Year	Pop.	±% p.a.
1968	4,266	—
1975	5,626	+4.03%
1982	6,049	+1.04%
1990	6,929	+1.71%
1999	7,282	+0.55%
2007	8,804	+2.40%
2012	9,874	+2.32%
2017	11,067	+2.31%
2023	11,310	+0.36%
Source: INSEE

Inhabitants of Le Luc are called Lucois (masculine) and Lucoises (feminine) in French.

== See also ==
- Communes of the Var department
