= Arthur Vichot =

French racing cyclist

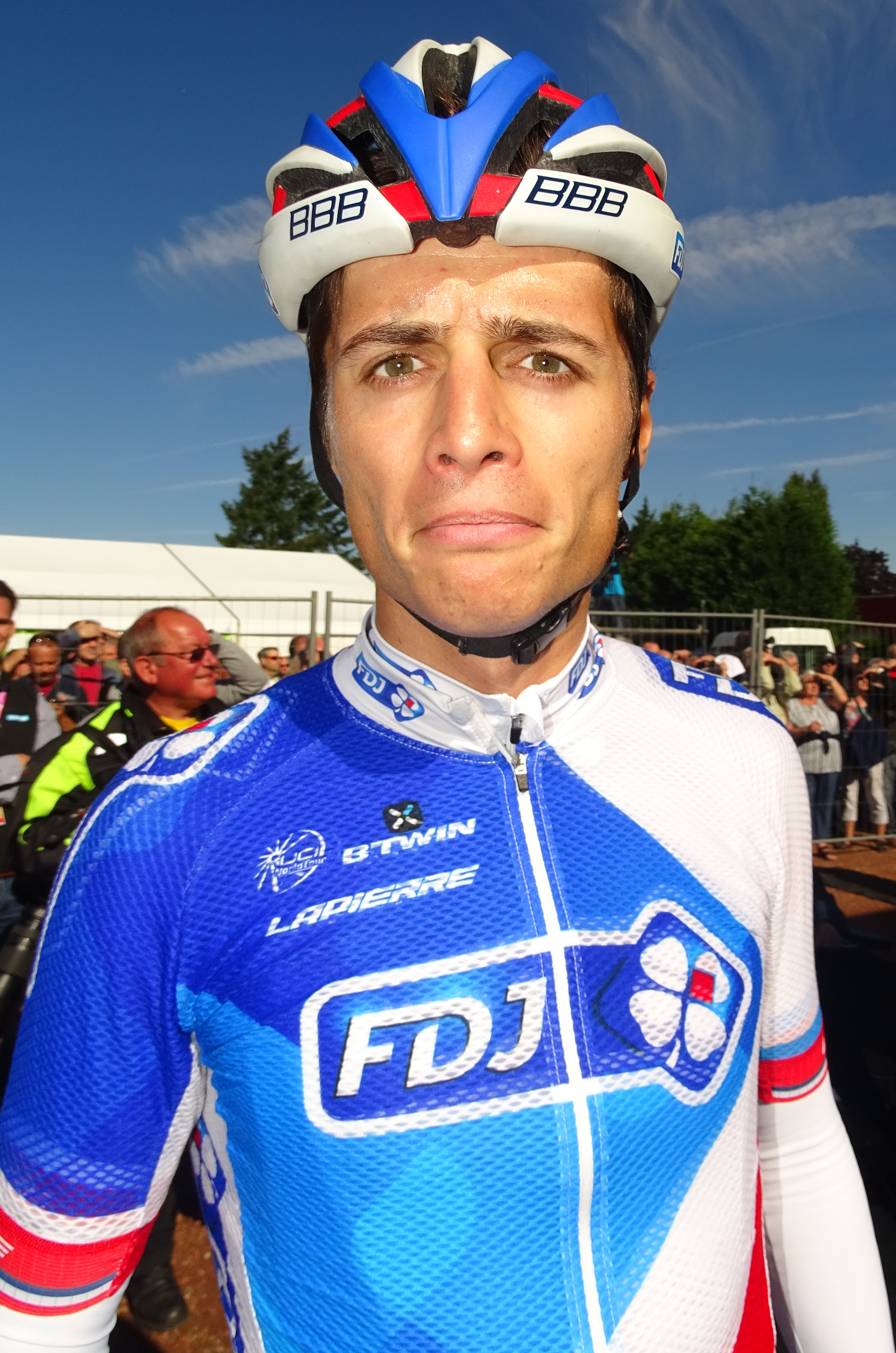
- Vichot at the 2015 Grand Prix d'Isbergues

Personal information
- Full name: Arthur Vichot
- Born: 26 November 1988 (age 37) Colombier-Fontaine, France
- Height: 1.84 m (6 ft 1/2 in)
- Weight: 70 kg (154 lb; 11 st 0 lb)

Cycling career
- Sport: Cycling
- Current team: Retired
- Discipline: Road
- Role: Rider

Amateur team
- 2008–2009: CR4C Roanne

Professional teams
- 2010–2018: Française des Jeux
- 2019–2020: Vital Concept–B&B Hotels

Major wins
- Single-day races and Classics National Road Race Championships (2013, 2016)

Arthur Vichot (French: [aʁtyʁ viʃo]; born 26 November 1988) is a French former professional cyclist, who rode professionally between 2010 and 2020, for the Groupama–FDJ and B&B Hotels–Vital Concept teams. He is the nephew of Frédéric Vichot, who won stages in the Tour de France in 1984 and 1985.

== Professional career ==
One tradition of the Tour Down Under is that the fans choose an unknown rider and treat him the way they would a star, by mobbing him at hotels and painting his name on the road. The rider must be a non-English speaking domestique who most likely will not get a start at a major race and will simply act as a bottle carrier. For 2010, in his first professional race, Arthur Vichot was chosen.

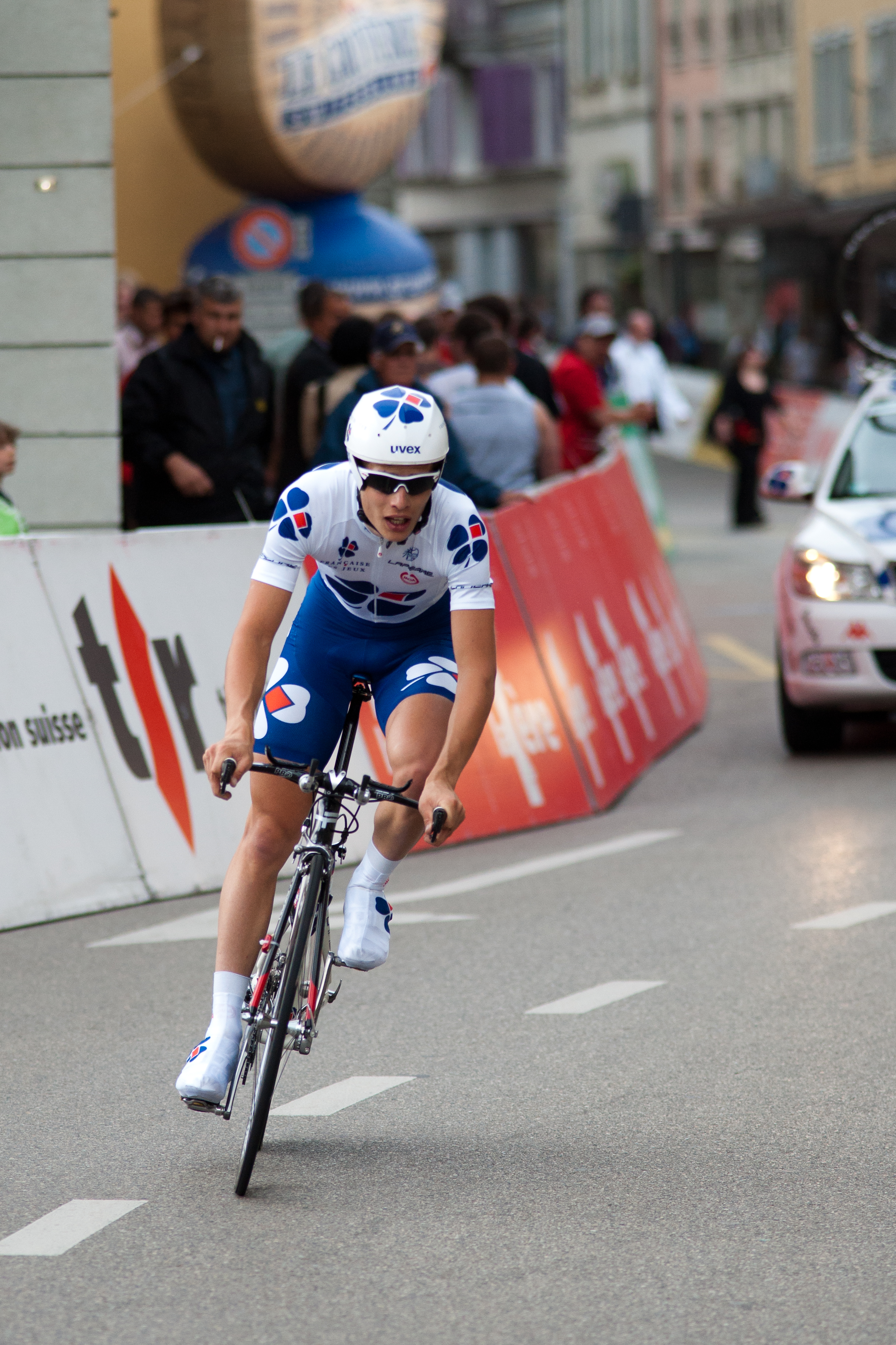
Vichot at the 2010 Tour de Romandie.

He started the 2011 season by taking fifth position at the Grand Prix d'Ouverture La Marseillaise. The next month, he went on to win the Boucles du Sud Ardèche, and he was selected to ride in Paris–Nice. Bad luck struck in the race as he crashed hard and cracked his clavicle, preventing him from racing the Ardennes classics. He was selected to race the Tour de France. He finished the event in 104th position after playing a role of domestique. In September, he achieved a solo victory near his home in the Tour du Doubs. He also cracked the top ten in the Grand Prix Cycliste de Montréal, finishing eighth.

In 2012, Vichot conquered the biggest victory of his career up to that point in the fifth stage of the Critérium du Dauphiné, a mountainous affair that led the riders across the Col de la Colombière. He was part of the breakaway that formed at the beginning of the race and resisted to the bunch. With 6 kilometres (3.7 mi) to go, Vichot distanced the remnants of the leading group, earning a solo victory.

In 2013 and 2016, Vichot won the French National Road Race Championships and the right to wear the coveted tricolor jersey in the Tour de France.

== Major results ==
2008
1st Stage 2 Grand Prix Guillaume Tell
2nd Road race, National Under-23 Road Championships
2009
3rd Overall Circuit des Ardennes
2010
1st Stage 2 Paris–Corrèze
8th Overall Tour de Wallonie
2011
1st Les Boucles du Sud Ardèche
1st Tour du Doubs
5th Grand Prix d'Ouverture La Marseillaise
8th Grand Prix Cycliste de Montréal
9th Overall Étoile de Bessèges
2012
1st Stage 5 Critérium du Dauphiné
2nd Les Boucles du Sud Ardèche
3rd Grand Prix d'Ouverture La Marseillaise
10th Boucles de l'Aulne
2013
1st Road race, National Road Championships
1st Overall Tour du Haut Var

1st Points classification
1st Young rider classification

2nd Grand Prix Cycliste de Québec
4th Grand Prix de Plumelec-Morbihan
9th Overall Étoile de Bessèges
10th Overall Tour Méditerranéen
2014
3rd Overall Paris–Nice

1st Stage 8

3rd GP Ouest–France
5th Overall Étoile de Bessèges
5th Grand Prix d'Ouverture La Marseillaise
8th Overall Tour du Limousin
2015
7th Grand Prix de Wallonie
8th Overall Circuit Cycliste Sarthe
8th Vuelta a Murcia
2016
1st Road race, National Road Championships
1st Overall Tour du Haut Var

1st Points classification
1st Stage 2

2nd Boucles de l'Aulne
3rd La Drôme Classic
3rd Grand Prix de Plumelec-Morbihan
5th Overall Étoile de Bessèges
7th Grand Prix d'Ouverture La Marseillaise
7th Trofeo Laigueglia
Combativity award Stage 11 Tour de France
2017
1st Overall Tour du Haut Var

1st Points classification

1st Grand Prix d'Ouverture La Marseillaise
2nd Overall Circuit de la Sarthe
2nd La Drôme Classic
4th Grand Prix de Plumelec-Morbihan
6th Classic Sud-Ardèche
7th Trofeo Laigueglia
2018
1st Overall Tour de l'Ain

1st Points classification
1st Stage 3

2nd Boucles de l'Aulne
4th Grand Prix de Plumelec-Morbihan
5th La Drôme Classic
7th Grand Prix Cycliste de Québec
10th Overall Tour de Suisse
2019
6th La Drôme Classic

=== Grand Tour general classification results timeline ===
| Grand Tour | 2010 | 2011 | 2012 | 2013 | 2014 | 2015 | 2016 | 2017 | 2018 |
|---|---|---|---|---|---|---|---|---|---|
| Giro d'Italia | Did not contest during his career | | | | | | | | |
| Tour de France | — | 103 | 94 | 66 | DNF | — | 78 | DNF | 41 |
| Vuelta a España | DNF | — | — | — | — | — | — | — | — |

Legend
| — | Did not compete |
| DNF | Did not finish |
