= Puget-Ville =

- Commune
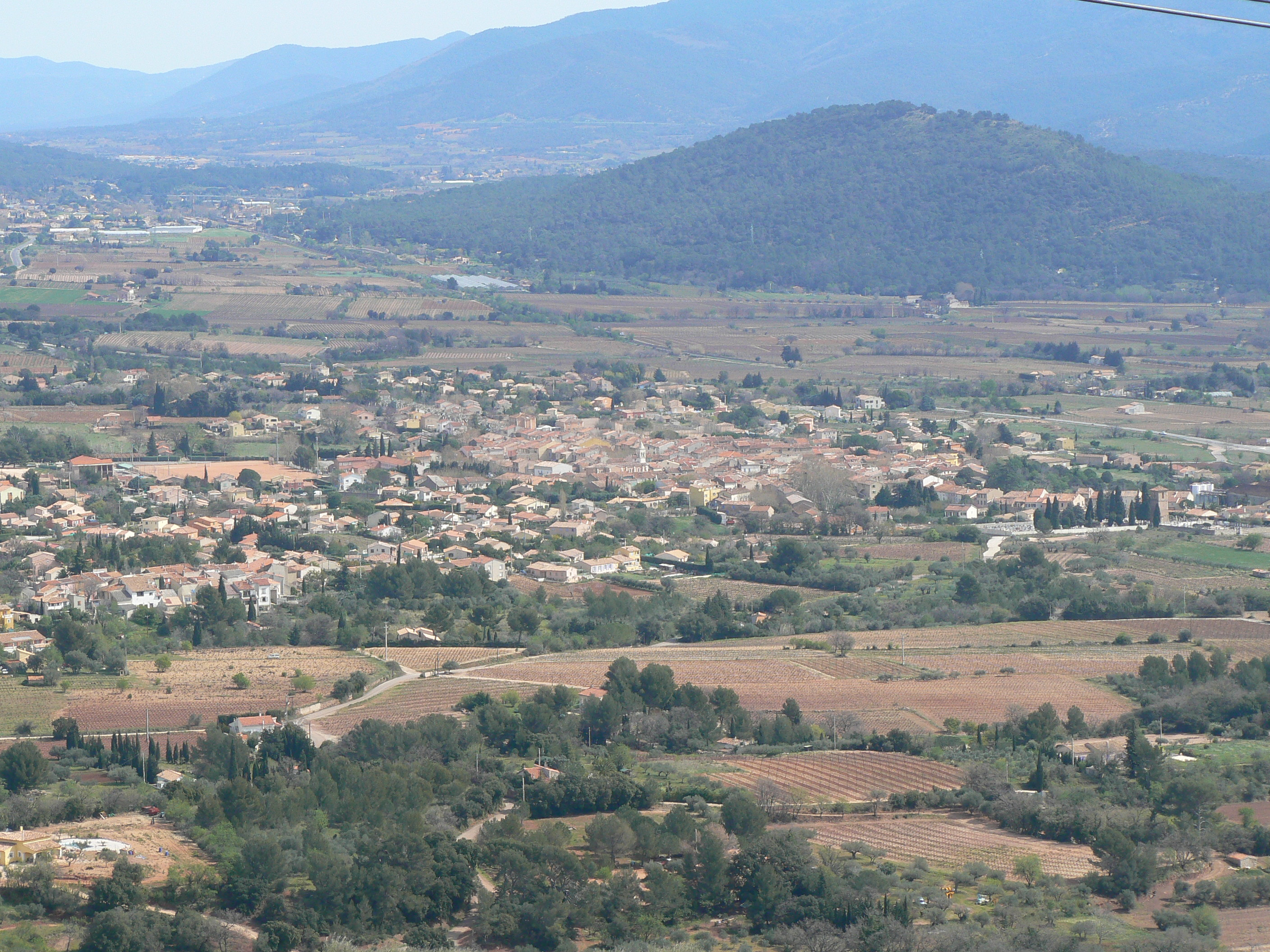
- A general view of Puget-Ville

- Coat of arms
- Location of Puget-Ville
- Location within France Location within Provence-Alpes-Côte d'Azur
- Coordinates: 43°17′25″N 6°08′13″E
- Country: France
- Region: Provence-Alpes-Côte d'Azur
- Department: Var
- Arrondissement: Brignoles
- Canton: Garéoult
- Intercommunality: Cœur du Var

Government
  - Mayor (2020–2026): Catherine Altare
- Area^{1}: 36.83 km^{2} (14.22 sq mi)
- Elevation: 139 m (456 ft)
- Highest elevation: 572 m (1,877 ft)
- Lowest elevation: 87 m (285 ft)
- Population (2023): 4,610
  - Density: 125/km^{2} (324/sq mi)
- Time zone: UTC+01:00 (CET)
  - Summer (DST): UTC+02:00 (CEST)
- INSEE/Postal code: 83100 /83390
- ^{1} French Land Register data, which excludes lakes, ponds, glaciers > 1 km^{2} (0.386 sq mi or 247 acres) and river estuaries.

Puget, officially Puget-Ville (French pronunciation: [pyʒɛ vil]; Occitan: Puget Vila) is a town and commune in the Var department in the Provence-Alpes-Côte d'Azur region in southeastern France.

== Population ==
Historical population
Year	Pop.	±% p.a.
1968	1,755	—
1975	1,819	+0.51%
1982	2,115	+2.18%
1990	2,591	+2.57%
1999	3,080	+1.94%
2007	3,628	+2.07%
2012	3,951	+1.72%
2017	4,280	+1.61%
2023	4,610	+1.25%
Source: INSEE

== Administration ==
Max Bastide was elected mayor in 2001 and re-elected in 2008. In 2014, Catherine Altare was elected mayor. She was re-elected in 2020.

== Twins towns ==
- Roccaforte Mondovi in Italy
- Aleksandrów Łódzki in Poland

== See also ==
- Communes of the Var department
