= Le Cannet-des-Maures =

- Commune
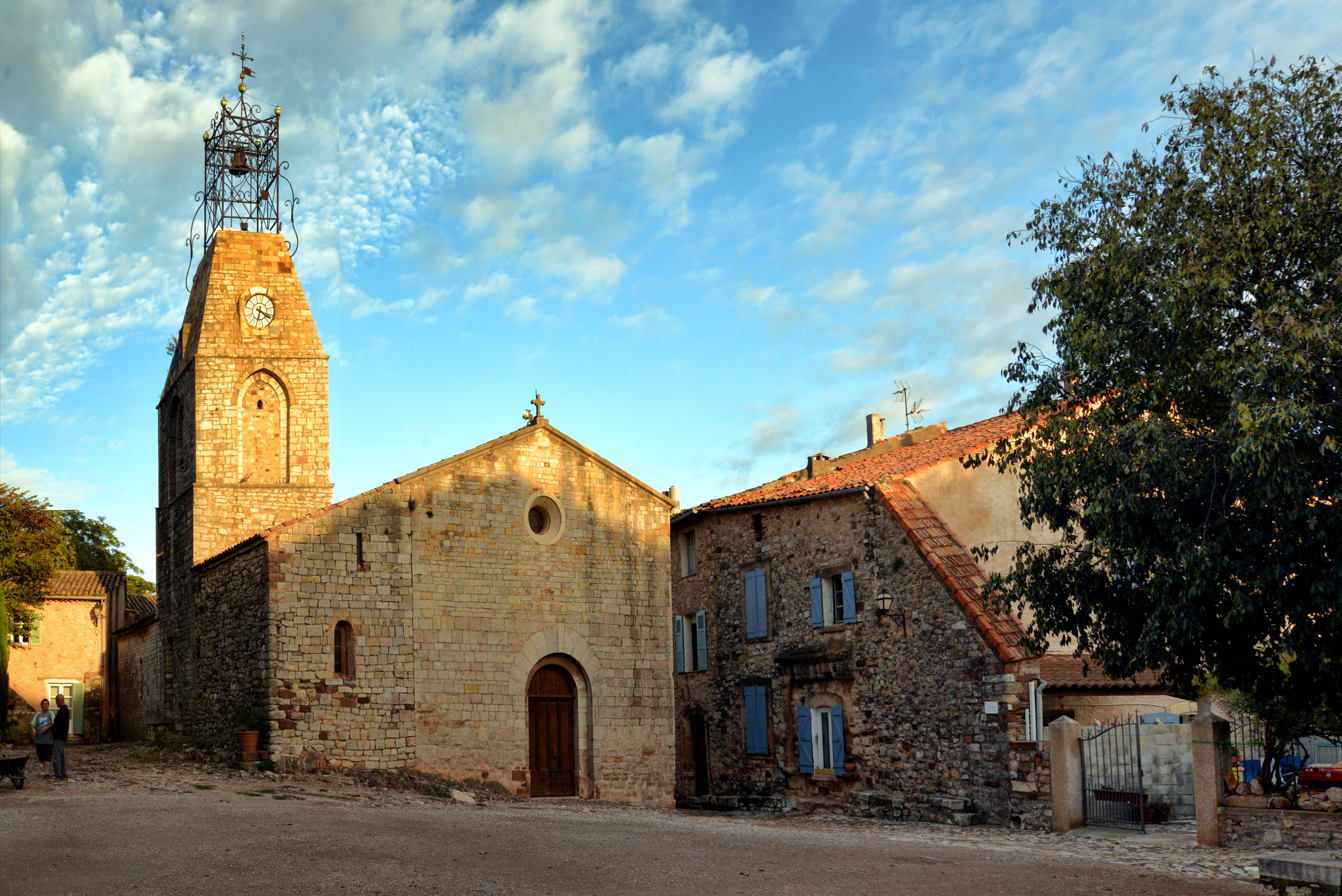
- The church of Saint-Michel

- Coat of arms
- Location of Le Cannet-des-Maures
- Location within France Location within Provence-Alpes-Côte d'Azur
- Coordinates: 43°23′30″N 6°20′27″E
- Country: France
- Region: Provence-Alpes-Côte d'Azur
- Department: Var
- Arrondissement: Brignoles
- Canton: Le Luc
- Intercommunality: Cœur du Var

Government
  - Mayor (2020–2026): Jean-Luc Longour
- Area^{1}: 73.64 km^{2} (28.43 sq mi)
- Highest elevation: 628 m (2,060 ft)
- Lowest elevation: 52 m (171 ft)
- Population (2023): 5,140
  - Density: 69.8/km^{2} (181/sq mi)
- Time zone: UTC+01:00 (CET)
  - Summer (DST): UTC+02:00 (CEST)
- INSEE/Postal code: 83031 /83340
- ^{1} French Land Register data, which excludes lakes, ponds, glaciers > 1 km^{2} (0.386 sq mi or 247 acres) and river estuaries.

Le Cannet-des-Maures (French pronunciation: [lə kanɛ de mɔʁ]; Occitan: Lo Canet dei Mauras) is a commune in the Var department in the Provence-Alpes-Côte d'Azur region in southeastern France.

== History ==
The town was called "Cannet" until the French Revolution, and later "Le Cannet". During World War II on 15 of June 1940, the airfield was attacked by 25 Italian fighters Fiat C.R.42s that strafed about 20 French aircraft destroying some of them.

== Population ==
Historical population
| Year | Pop. | ±% p.a. |
|---|---|---|
| 1968 | 1,435 | — |
| 1975 | 1,699 | +2.44% |
| 1982 | 2,320 | +4.55% |
| 1990 | 3,126 | +3.80% |
| 1999 | 3,478 | +1.19% |
| 2007 | 3,908 | +1.47% |
| 2012 | 4,187 | +1.39% |
| 2017 | 4,300 | +0.53% |
| 2023 | 5,140 | +3.02% |
Source: INSEE

== See also ==
- Communes of the Var department
