= 2019 in men's road cycling =

2019 in men's road cycling is about the 2019 men's bicycle races governed by the UCI. The races are part of the UCI Road Calendar.

== World Championships ==
The World Road Championships were held in Innsbruck, Austria, from 22 to 30 September 2019.

Events at the 2019 UCI Road World Championships
Race	Date	Winner	Second	Third	Ref
World Championship Mixed Relay	September 23	Netherlands	(Germany)	United Kingdom	
World Championship Time Trial	September 26	Rohan Dennis (AUS)	Remco Evenepoel (BEL)	Filippo Ganna (ITA)	
World Championship Road Race	September 30	Mads Pedersen (DEN)	Matteo Trentin (ITA)	Stefan Küng (SUI)	

== Grand Tours ==
Grand Tours in the 2019 season
Race	Date	Winner	Second	Third	Ref
(Italy) Giro d'Italia	11 May – 2 June	Richard Carapaz (ECU)	Vincenzo Nibali (ITA)	Primož Roglič (SLO)	
Tour de France	6–28 July	Egan Bernal (COL)	Geraint Thomas (GBR)	Steven Kruijswijk (NED)	
(Spain) Vuelta a España	24 August – 15 September	Primož Roglič (SLO)	Alejandro Valverde (ESP)	Tadej Pogačar (SLO)	

== UCI World Tour ==
For the 2019 season, the UCI World Tour calendar contains the same events as in 2018.

Race	Date	Winner	Second	Third	Ref
(Australia) Santos Tour Down Under	15–20 January	Daryl Impey (RSA)	Richie Porte (AUS)	Wout Poels (NED)	
(Australia) Cadel Evans Great Ocean Road Race	27 January	Elia Viviani (ITA)	Caleb Ewan (AUS)	Daryl Impey (RSA)	
(United Arab Emirates) UAE Tour	24 February – 2 March	Primož Roglič (SLO)	Alejandro Valverde (ESP)	David Gaudu (FRA)	
(Belgium) Omloop Het Nieuwsblad	2 March	Zdeněk Štybar (CZE)	Greg Van Avermaet (BEL)	Tim Wellens (BEL)	
(Italy) Strade Bianche	9 March	Julian Alaphilippe (FRA)	Jakob Fuglsang (DEN)	Wout Van Aert (BEL)	
(France) Paris–Nice	10–17 March	Egan Bernal (COL)	Nairo Quintana (COL)	Michał Kwiatkowski (POL)	
(Italy) Tirreno–Adriatico	13–19 March	Primož Roglič (SLO)	Adam Yates (GBR)	Jakob Fuglsang (DEN)	
(Italy) Milan–San Remo	23 March	Julian Alaphilippe (FRA)	Oliver Naesen (BEL)	Michał Kwiatkowski (POL)	
(Spain) Volta Ciclista a Catalunya	25–31 March	Miguel Ángel López (COL)	Adam Yates (GBR)	Egan Bernal (COL)	
(Belgium) Three Days of Bruges–De Panne	27 March	Dylan Groenewegen (NED)	Fernando Gaviria (COL)	Elia Viviani (ITA)	
(Belgium) Record Bank E3 Harelbeke	29 March	Zdeněk Štybar (CZE)	Wout van Aert (BEL)	Greg Van Avermaet (BEL)	
(Belgium) Gent–Wevelgem	31 March	Alexander Kristoff (NOR)	John Degenkolb (GER)	Oliver Naesen (BEL)	
(Belgium) Dwars door Vlaanderen	3 April	Mathieu van der Poel (NED)	Anthony Turgis (FRA)	Bob Jungels (LUX)	
(Belgium) Ronde van Vlaanderen	7 April	Alberto Bettiol (ITA)	Kasper Asgreen (DEN)	Alexander Kristoff (NOR)	
(Spain) Vuelta al País Vasco	8–13 April	Ion Izagirre (ESP)	Dan Martin (IRL)	Emanuel Buchmann (GER)	
(France) Paris–Roubaix	14 April	Philippe Gilbert (BEL)	Nils Politt (GER)	Yves Lampaert (BEL)	
Presidential Tour of Turkey	16–21 April	Felix Großschartner (AUT)	Valerio Conti (ITA)	Merhawi Kudus (ERI)	
(Netherlands) Amstel Gold Race	21 April	Mathieu van der Poel (NED)	Simon Clarke (AUS)	Jakob Fuglsang (DEN)	
(Belgium) La Flèche Wallonne	24 April	Julian Alaphilippe (FRA)	Jakob Fuglsang (DEN)	Diego Ulissi (ITA)	
(Belgium) Liège–Bastogne–Liège	28 April	Jakob Fuglsang (DEN)	Davide Formolo (ITA)	Maximilian Schachmann (GER)	
(Switzerland) Tour de Romandie	30 April – 5 May	Primož Roglič (SLO)	Rui Costa (POR)	Geraint Thomas (GBR)	
(Germany) Eschborn–Frankfurt	1 May	Pascal Ackermann (GER)	John Degenkolb (GER)	Alexander Kristoff (NOR)	
(United States) Amgen Tour of California	12–18 May	Tadej Pogačar (SLO)	Sergio Higuita (COL)	Kasper Asgreen (DEN)	
(France) Critérium du Dauphiné	9–16 June	Jakob Fuglsang (DEN)	Tejay van Garderen (USA)	Emanuel Buchmann (GER)	
(Switzerland) Tour de Suisse	15–23 June	Egan Bernal (COL)	Rohan Dennis (AUS)	Patrick Konrad (AUT)	
(Spain) Clásica Ciclista San Sebastián	3 August	Remco Evenepoel (BEL)	Greg Van Avermaet (BEL)	Marc Hirschi (SUI)	
(United Kingdom) Prudential RideLondon–Surrey Classic	4 August	Elia Viviani (ITA)	Sam Bennett (IRL)	Michael Mørkøv (DEN)	
(Poland) Tour de Pologne	3–9 August	Pavel Sivakov (RUS)	Jai Hindley (AUS)	Diego Ulissi (ITA)	
(Belgium) (Netherlands) BinckBank Tour	12–18 August	Laurens De Plus (BEL)	Oliver Naesen (BEL)	Tim Wellens (BEL)	
(Germany) EuroEyes Cyclassics Hamburg	25 August	Elia Viviani (ITA)	Caleb Ewan (AUS)	Giacomo Nizzolo (ITA)	
Bretagne Classic Ouest-France	1 September	Sep Vanmarcke (BEL)	Tiesj Benoot (BEL)	Jack Haig (AUS)	
(Canada) Grand Prix Cycliste de Québec	13 September	Michael Matthews (AUS)	Peter Sagan (SVK)	Greg Van Avermaet (BEL)	
(Canada) Grand Prix Cycliste de Montréal	15 September	Greg Van Avermaet (BEL)	Diego Ulissi (ITA)	Iván García (ESP)	
(Italy) Il Lombardia	12 October	Bauke Mollema (NED)	Alejandro Valverde (ESP)	Egan Bernal (COL)	
(China) Gree-Tour of Guangxi	17–22 October	Enric Mas (ESP)	Daniel Martínez (COL)	Diego Rosa (ITA)	

== UCI tours ==
Tour	Individual champion	Team champion	Nations champion
UCI World Ranking	Primož Roglič (SLO)	Deceuninck–Quick-Step	Belgium
World Tour Stage Race	Primož Roglič (SLO)	No team ranking	No nation ranking
World Tour One-Day	Greg Van Avermaet (BEL)	No team ranking	No nation ranking
Africa Tour	Daryl Impey (RSA)	ProTouch	South Africa
America Tour	Egan Bernal (COL)	Medellín	Colombia
Asia Tour	Alexey Lutsenko (KAZ)	Terengganu Inc. TSG	Kazakhstan
Europe Tour	Primož Roglič (SLO)	Total Direct Énergie	Belgium
Oceania Tour	Caleb Ewan (AUS)	Team BridgeLane	Australia

== 2.HC Category Races ==
Race	Date	Winner	Second	Third	Ref
Tour of Oman	16–21 February	Alexey Lutsenko (KAZ)	Domenico Pozzovivo (ITA)	Jesus Herrada (ESP)	
(Spain) Vuelta a Andalucía	20–24 February	Jakob Fuglsang (DEN)	Ion Izagirre (ESP)	Steven Kruijswijk (NED)	
(Portugal) Volta ao Algarve em Bicicleta	20–24 February	Tadej Pogačar (SLO)	Søren Kragh Andersen (DEN)	Wout Poels (NED)	
(Malaysia) Le Tour de Langkawi	7–14 April	Ben Dyball (AUS)	Keegan Swirbul (USA)	Vadim Pronskiy (KAZ)	
(Italy) Tour of the Alps	22–26 April	Pavel Sivakov (RUS)	Tao Geoghegan Hart (GBR)	Vincenzo Nibali (ITA)	
(United Kingdom) Tour de Yorkshire	2–5 May	Chris Lawless (GBR)	Greg Van Avermaet (BEL)	Eddie Dunbar (IRL)	
(France) Four Days of Dunkirk	14–19 May	Mike Teunissen (NED)	Amund Grøndahl Jansen (NOR)	Jens Keukeleire (BEL)	
Tour of Norway	28 May – 2 June	Alexander Kristoff (NOR)	Kristoffer Halvorsen (NOR)	Edvald Boasson Hagen (NOR)	
Skoda-Tour de Luxembourg	5 – 9 June	Jesus Herrada (ESP)	Maurits Lammertink (NED)	Andrea Pasqualon (ITA)	
Baloise Belgium Tour	12 – 16 June	Remco Evenepoel (BEL)	Victor Campenaerts (BEL)	Tim Wellens (BEL)	
Tour of Slovenia	19 – 23 June	Diego Ulissi (ITA)	Giovanni Visconti (ITA)	Aleksandr Vlasov (RUS)	
(China) Tour of Qinghai Lake	14 27 July	Robinson Chalapud (COL)	Óscar Sevilla (ESP)	Benjamin Dyball (AUS)	
(Belgium) VOO-Tour de Wallonie	27 – 31 July	Loïc Vliegen (BEL)	Tosh Van der Sande (BEL)	Dries De Bondt (BEL)	
(Spain) Vuelta a Burgos	13 – 17 August	Iván Sosa (COL)	Óscar Rodríguez (COL)	Richard Carapaz (ECU)	
(United States) The Larry H. Miller Tour of Utah	12 – 18 August	Ben Hermans (BEL)	James Piccoli (CAN)	Joe Dombrowski (USA)	
Arctic Race of Norway	15 – 18 August	Alexey Lutsenko (KAZ)	Warren Barguil (FRA)	Krists Neilands (LAT)	
(Denmark) PostNord Danmark Rundt	21–25 August	Niklas Larsen (DEN)	Jonas Vingegaard (DEN)	Rasmus Quaade (DEN)	
(Germany) Deutschland Tour	29 August – 1 September	Jasper Stuyven (BEL)	Sonny Colbrelli (ITA)	Yves Lampaert (BEL)	
(United Kingdom) Tour of Britain	7 – 4 September	Mathieu van der Poel (NED)	Matteo Trentin (ITA)	Jasper De Buyst (BEL)	

== 1.HC Category Races ==
Race	Date	Winner	Second	Third	Ref
(Spain) Clásica de Almería	17 February	Pascal Ackermann (GER)	Marcel Kittel (GER)	Luka Mezgec (SLO)	
(Italy) Trofeo Laigueglia	17 February	Simone Velasco (ITA)	Nicola Bagioli (ITA)	Matteo Sobrero (ITA)	
(Belgium) Kuurne–Brussels–Kuurne	3 March	Bob Jungels (LUX)	Owain Doull (GBR)	Niki Terpstra (NED)	
(Italy) GP Industria & Artigianato	10 March	Maximilian Schachmann (GER)	Mattia Cattaneo (ITA)	Andrea Vendrame (ITA)	
(Netherlands) Ronde van Drenthe	17 March	Pim Ligthart (NED)	Robbert de Greef (NED)	Nicola Bagioli (ITA)	
(Belgium) Nokere Koerse	20 March	Cees Bol (NED)	Pascal Ackermann (GER)	Jasper Philipsen (BEL)	
(Belgium) Handzame Classic	22 March	Pascal Ackermann (GER)	Kristoffer Halvorsen (NOR)	Álvaro José Hodeg (COL)	
(France) GP de Denain	24 March	Mathieu van der Poel (NED)	Marc Sarreau (FRA)	Timothy Dupont (BEL)	
(Belgium) Scheldeprijs	10 April	Fabio Jakobsen (NED)	Max Walscheid (GER)	Chris Lawless (GBR)	
(Belgium) Brabantse Pijl	17 April	Mathieu van der Poel (NED)	Julian Alaphilippe (FRA)	Tim Wellens (BEL)	
(Switzerland) GP du canton d'Argovie	13 June	Alexander Kristoff (NOR)	Andrea Pasqualon (ITA)	Reinardt Janse van Rensburg (RSA)	
(Belgium) Brussels Cycling Classic	7 September	Caleb Ewan (AUS)	Pascal Ackermann (GER)	Jasper Philipsen (BEL)	
(France) GP de Fourmies	8 September	Pascal Ackermann (GER)	Arnaud Démare (FRA)	Álvaro José Hodeg (COL)	
(Belgium) Primus Classic	21 September	Edward Theuns (BEL)	Pascal Ackermann (GER)	Jasper De Buyst (BEL)	
(Germany) Sparkassen Münsterland Giro	3 October	Álvaro José Hodeg (COL)	Pascal Ackermann (GER)	Tim Merlier (BEL)	
(Italy) Giro dell'Emilia	5 October	Primož Roglič (SLO)	Michael Woods (CAN)	Sergio Higuita (COL)	
(Belgium) Tour de l'Eurométropole	5 October	Piet Allegaert (BEL)	Florian Sénéchal (FRA)	Jasper Stuyven (BEL)	
(Italy) GP Bruno Beghelli	6 October	Sonny Colbrelli (ITA)	Alejandro Valverde (ESP)	Jack Haig (AUS)	
(Italy) Tre Valli Varesine	8 October	Primož Roglič (SLO)	Giovanni Visconti (ITA)	Toms Skujiņš (LAT)	
(Italy) Milano–Torino	9 October	Michael Woods (CAN)	Alejandro Valverde (ESP)	Adam Yates (GBR)	
(Italy) Gran Piemonte	10 October	Egan Bernal (COL)	Iván Sosa (COL)	Nans Peters (FRA)	
(France) Paris–Tours	13 October	Jelle Wallays (BEL)	Niki Terpstra (NED)	Oliver Naesen (BEL)	
Japan Cup	October 21	Bauke Mollema (NED)	Michael Woods (CAN)	Dion Smith (NZL)	

== Championships ==
=== Continental Championships ===
Championships	Race	Date	Winner	Second	Third	Ref
African Championships; Ethiopia	Road race	19 March	Mekseb Debesay (ERI)	Azzedine Lagab (ALG)	Youcef Reguigui (ALG)	
African Championships; Ethiopia	Individual time trial	17 March	Stefan de Bod (RSA)	Sirak Tesfom (ERI)	Ryan Gibbons (RSA)	
African Championships; Ethiopia	Team time trial	15 March	Eritrea	Rwanda	Ethiopia	
Pan American Championships; Mexico	Road race	5 May	Jefferson Cepeda (ECU)	Julio Camacho (COL)	Segundo Navarrete (ECU)	
Pan American Championships; Mexico	Individual time trial	1 May	Brandon Rivera (COL)	José Rodríguez (CHI)	Ignacio Prado (MEX)	
Asian Championships; Uzbekistan	Road race	28 April	Yevgeniy Gidich (KAZ)	Lyu Xianjing (CHN)	Feng Chun-kai (TPE)	
Asian Championships; Uzbekistan	Individual time trial	25 April	Daniil Fominykh (KAZ)	Feng Chun-kai (TPE)	Cheung King Lok (HKG)	
Asian Championships; Uzbekistan	Team time trial	23 April	Kazakhstan	South Korea	Hong Kong	
European Championships; Great Britain	Road race	8–11 August	Elia Viviani (ITA)	Yves Lampaert (BEL)	Pascal Ackermann (GER)	
European Championships; Great Britain	Individual time trial	8–11 August	Remco Evenepoel (BEL)	Kasper Asgreen (DEN)	Edoardo Affini (ITA)	
Oceanian Championships; Australia	Road race	17 March	Benjamin Dyball (AUS)	Jason Christie (NZL)	Chris Harper (AUS)	
Oceanian Championships; Australia	Individual time trial	15 March	Benjamin Dyball (AUS)	Jason Christie (NZL)	Michael Freiberg (AUS)	

== UCI Teams ==
=== UCI WorldTeams ===
The UCI granted a UCI WorldTour licence to the following eighteen teams:

- (Australia) Mitchelton–Scott
- Bahrain–Merida
- (Belgium) Lotto–Soudal
- (Belgium) Deceuninck–Quick-Step
- (France) AG2R La Mondiale
- (France) Groupama–FDJ
- (Germany) Bora–Hansgrohe
- (Germany) Team Sunweb
- (United Kingdom) Team INEOS
- (Kazakhstan) Astana
- (Netherlands) Team Jumbo–Visma
- (Poland) CCC Team
- (South Africa) Team Dimension Data
- (Spain) Movistar Team
- (Switzerland) Team Katusha–Alpecin
- (United Arab Emirates) UAE Team Emirates
- (United States) EF Education First
- (United States) Trek–Segafredo
