= 2019 Bora–Hansgrohe season =

Bora–Hansgrohe
- 2019 season
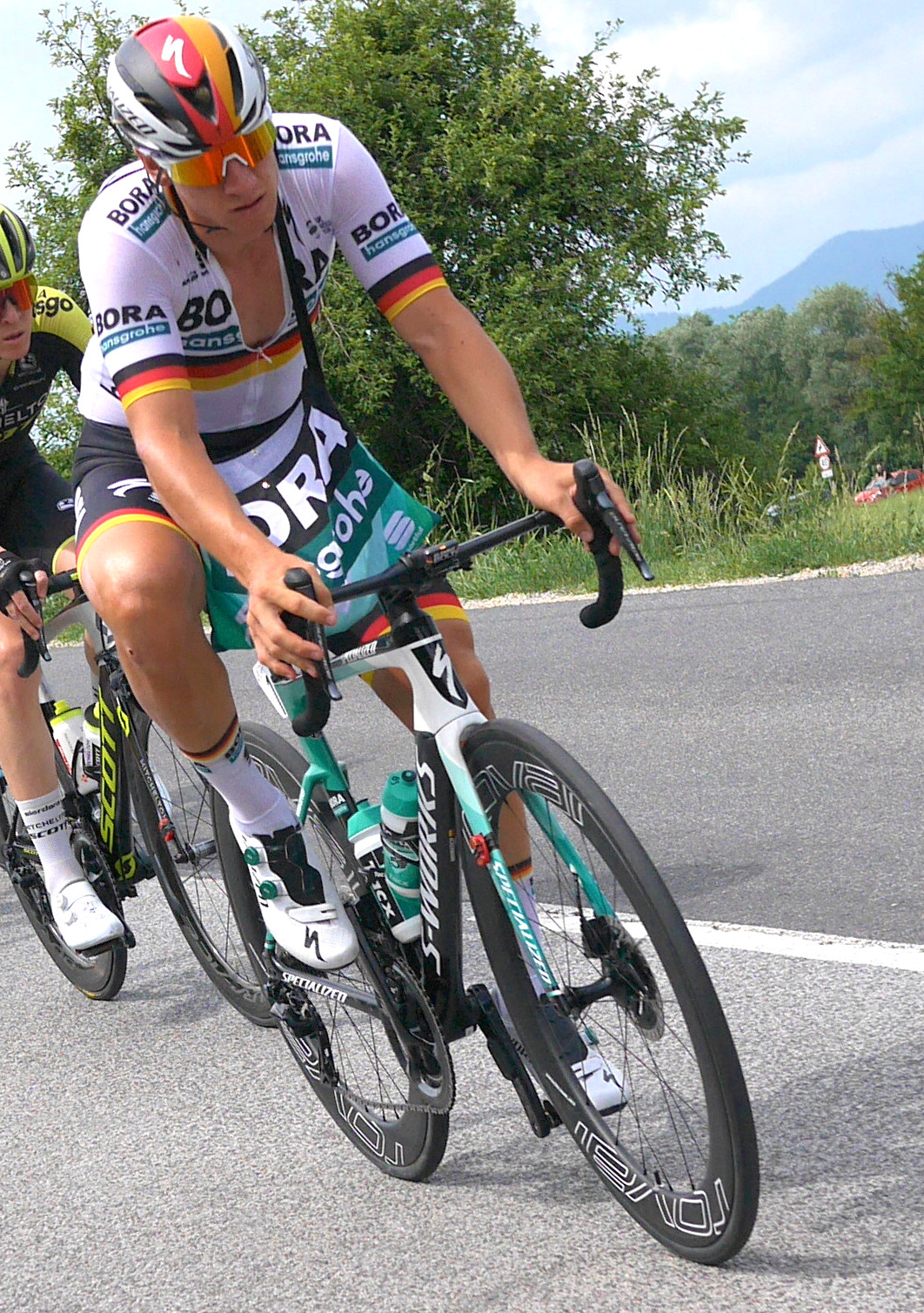
- Pascal Ackermann achieved 13 wins in 2019 (pictured in 2019 Tour of Slovenia)
- UCI code: BOH
- Status: UCI WorldTeam
- Manager: Ralph Denk
- Main sponsor(s): BORA & Hansgrohe
- Based: Germany
- Bicycles: Specialized
- Groupset: Shimano

Season victories
- One-day races: 6
- Stage race overall: 1
- Stage race stages: 28
- National Championships: 5
- Most wins: Pascal Ackermann (13)
- Best ranked rider: Peter Sagan (10th)
- Jersey

The 2019 season for the Bora–Hansgrohe cycling team began in January.

== 2019 roster ==
As of 23 May 2019.

| Rider | Date of birth |
|---|---|
| Pascal Ackermann (GER) | 17 January 1994 (aged 25) |
| Shane Archbold (Note: Archbold joined the team on 11 April, from EvoPro Racing) (NZL) | 2 February 1989 (aged 30) |
| Erik Baška (SVK) | 12 January 1994 (aged 25) |
| Cesare Benedetti (ITA) | 3 August 1987 (aged 31) |
| Sam Bennett (IRL) | 16 October 1990 (aged 28) |
| Maciej Bodnar (POL) | 7 March 1985 (aged 34) |
| Emanuel Buchmann (GER) | 18 November 1992 (aged 26) |
| Marcus Burghardt (GER) | 30 June 1983 (aged 35) |
| Jempy Drucker (LUX) | 3 September 1986 (aged 32) |
| Davide Formolo (ITA) | 25 October 1992 (aged 26) |
| Oscar Gatto (ITA) | 1 January 1985 (aged 34) |
| Felix Großschartner (AUT) | 23 December 1993 (aged 25) |
| Peter Kennaugh (Note: Kennaugh decided to take an indefinite break from professional cycling to focus on mental health) (GBR) | 15 June 1989 (aged 29) |
| Leopold König (CZE) | 15 November 1987 (aged 31) |

| Rider | Date of birth |
|---|---|
| Patrick Konrad (AUT) | 13 October 1991 (aged 27) |
| Rafał Majka (POL) | 12 September 1989 (aged 29) |
| Jay McCarthy (AUS) | 8 September 1992 (aged 26) |
| Gregor Mühlberger (AUT) | 4 April 1994 (aged 25) |
| Daniel Oss (ITA) | 13 January 1987 (aged 32) |
| Christoph Pfingsten (GER) | 20 November 1987 (aged 31) |
| Paweł Poljański (POL) | 6 May 1990 (aged 29) |
| Lukas Pöstlberger (AUT) | 10 January 1992 (aged 27) |
| Juraj Sagan (SVK) | 23 December 1988 (aged 30) |
| Peter Sagan (SVK) | 26 January 1990 (aged 29) |
| Maximilian Schachmann (GER) | 9 January 1994 (aged 25) |
| Andreas Schillinger (GER) | 13 July 1983 (aged 35) |
| Michael Schwarzmann (GER) | 7 January 1991 (aged 28) |
| Rüdiger Selig (GER) | 19 February 1989 (aged 30) |

Riders who joined the team for the 2019 season

| Rider | 2018 team |
|---|---|
| Shane Archbold | EvoPro Racing |
| Jempy Drucker | BMC Racing Team |
| Oscar Gatto | Astana |
| Maximilian Schachmann | Quick-Step Floors |

Riders who left the team during or after the 2018 season

| Rider | 2019 team |
|---|---|
| Michael Kolář | Retired |
| Matteo Pelucchi | Androni Giocattoli–Sidermec |
| Aleksejs Saramotins | Interpro Cycling Academy |

== Season victories ==
| Date | Race | Competition | Rider | Country | Location |
|---|---|---|---|---|---|
| 17 January | Tour Down Under, Stage 3 | UCI World Tour | Peter Sagan (SVK) | Australia | Uraidla |
| 1 February | Trofeo Andratx - Lloseta | UCI Europe Tour | Emanuel Buchmann (GER) | Spain | Lloseta |
| 3 February | Vuelta a San Juan, Stage 7 | UCI America Tour | Sam Bennett (IRL) | Argentina | San Juan |
| 17 February | Clásica de Almería | UCI Europe Tour | Pascal Ackermann (GER) | Spain | Roquetas de Mar |
| 24 February | Volta ao Algarve, Points classification | UCI Europe Tour | Pascal Ackermann (GER) | Portugal | |
| 2 March | UAE Tour, Stage 7 | UCI World Tour | Sam Bennett (IRL) | United Arab Emirates | Dubai |
| 10 March | GP Industria & Artigianato di Larciano | UCI Europe Tour | Maximilian Schachmann (GER) | Italy | Larciano |
| 12 March | Paris–Nice, Stage 3 | UCI World Tour | Sam Bennett (IRL) | France | Moulins/Yzeure |
| 15 March | Paris–Nice, Stage 6 | UCI World Tour | Sam Bennett (IRL) | France | Brignoles |
| 22 March | Bredene–Koksijde Classic | UCI Europe Tour | Pascal Ackermann (GER) | Belgium | Koksijde |
| 29 March | Volta a Catalunya, Stage 5 | UCI World Tour | Maximilian Schachmann (GER) | Spain | Sant Cugat del Vallès |
| 31 March | Volta a Catalunya, Stage 7 | UCI World Tour | Davide Formolo (ITA) | Spain | Barcelona |
| 8 April | Tour of the Basque Country, Stage 1 | UCI World Tour | Maximilian Schachmann (GER) | Spain | Zumarraga |
| 10 April | Tour of the Basque Country, Stage 3 | UCI World Tour | Maximilian Schachmann (GER) | Spain | Estíbaliz |
| 11 April | Tour of the Basque Country, Stage 4 | UCI World Tour | Maximilian Schachmann (GER) | Spain | Arrigorriaga |
| 12 April | Tour of the Basque Country, Stage 5 | UCI World Tour | Emanuel Buchmann (GER) | Spain | Arrate |
| 13 April | Tour of the Basque Country, Points classification | UCI World Tour | Maximilian Schachmann (GER) | Spain | |
| 16 April | Presidential Tour of Turkey, Stage 1 | UCI World Tour | Sam Bennett (IRL) | Turkey | Tekirdağ |
| 17 April | Presidential Tour of Turkey, Stage 2 | UCI World Tour | Sam Bennett (IRL) | Turkey | Eceabat |
| 20 April | Presidential Tour of Turkey, Stage 5 | UCI World Tour | Felix Großschartner (AUT) | Turkey | Kartepe |
| 21 April | Presidential Tour of Turkey, Overall | UCI World Tour | Felix Großschartner (AUT) | Turkey | |
| 21 April | Presidential Tour of Turkey, Points classification | UCI World Tour | Sam Bennett (IRL) | Turkey | |
| 1 May | Eschborn–Frankfurt | UCI World Tour | Pascal Ackermann (GER) | Germany | Frankfurt |
| 12 May | Giro d'Italia, Stage 2 | UCI World Tour | Pascal Ackermann (GER) | Italy | Fucecchio |
| 12 May | Tour of California, Stage 1 | UCI World Tour | Peter Sagan (SVK) | United States | Sacramento |
| 15 May | Giro d'Italia, Stage 5 | UCI World Tour | Pascal Ackermann (GER) | Italy | Terracina |
| 23 May | Giro d'Italia, Stage 12 | UCI World Tour | Cesare Benedetti (ITA) | Italy | Pinerolo |
| 2 June | Giro d'Italia, Points classification | UCI World Tour | Pascal Ackermann (GER) | Italy | |
| 11 June | Critérium du Dauphiné, Stage 3 | UCI World Tour | Sam Bennett (IRL) | France | Riom |
| 17 June | Tour de Suisse, Stage 3 | UCI World Tour | Peter Sagan (SVK) | Switzerland | Murten |
| 19 June | Tour of Slovenia, Stage 1 | UCI Europe Tour | Pascal Ackermann (GER) | Slovenia | Rogaška Slatina |
| 10 July | Tour de France, Stage 5 | UCI World Tour | Peter Sagan (SVK) | France | Colmar |
| 28 July | Tour de France, Points classification | UCI World Tour | Peter Sagan (SVK) | France | |
| 3 August | Tour de Pologne, Stage 1 | UCI World Tour | Pascal Ackermann (GER) | Poland | Kraków |
| 5 August | Tour de Pologne, Stage 3 | UCI World Tour | Pascal Ackermann (GER) | Poland | Zabrze |
| 12 August | BinckBank Tour, Stage 1 | UCI World Tour | Sam Bennett (IRL) | Netherlands | Hulst |
| 13 August | BinckBank Tour, Stage 2 | UCI World Tour | Sam Bennett (IRL) | Belgium | Ardooie |
| 14 August | BinckBank Tour, Stage 3 | UCI World Tour | Sam Bennett (IRL) | Belgium | Aalter |
| 18 August | BinckBank Tour, Points classification | UCI World Tour | Sam Bennett (IRL) | Belgium; Netherlands | |
| 16 August | Czech Cycling Tour, Stage 2 | UCI Europe Tour | Shane Archbold (NZL) | Czech Republic | Frýdek-Místek |
| 29 August | Deutschland Tour, Stage 1 | UCI Europe Tour | Pascal Ackermann (GER) | Germany | Halberstadt |
| 8 September | GP de Fourmies | UCI Europe Tour | Pascal Ackermann (GER) | France | Fourmies |
| 22 September | Gooikse Pijl | UCI Europe Tour | Pascal Ackermann (GER) | Belgium | Gooik |
| 19 October | Tour of Guangxi, Stage 3 | UCI World Tour | Pascal Ackermann (GER) | China | Nanning |
| 22 October | Tour of Guangxi, Stage 6 | UCI World Tour | Pascal Ackermann (GER) | China | Guilin |

== National, Continental and World champions ==
| Date | Discipline | Jersey | Rider | Country | Location |
|---|---|---|---|---|---|
| 28 June | Polish National Time Trial Championships | | Maciej Bodnar (POL) | Poland | Ostróda |
| 30 June | Austrian National Road Race Championships | | Patrick Konrad (AUT) | Austria | Mondsee |
| 30 June | Irish National Road Race Championships | | Sam Bennett (IRL) | Ireland | Derry |
| 30 June | Slovak National Road Race Championships | | Juraj Sagan (SVK) | Slovakia | Trnava |
| 30 June | German National Road Race Championships | | Maximilian Schachmann (GER) | Germany | Sachsenring |
| 30 June | Italian National Road Race Championships | | Davide Formolo (ITA) | Italy | Compiano |
