= 2020 UAE Tour =

Cycling race

2020 UCI World Tour, race 3 of 21

Race details
- Dates: 23–27 February 2020 (Note: The race was initially scheduled to be held between 23–29 February 2020, but was shortened when two staff members tested positive for COVID-19.)
- Stages: 5 (Note: The race was initially due to have 7 stages, but the last 2 were cancelled when two staff members tested positive for COVID-19.)
- Distance: 835 km (519 mi)
- Winning time: 20h 35' 04"

Results
Jersey awarded to the overall winner	Winner	Adam Yates (GBR)	(Mitchelton–Scott)
	Second	Tadej Pogačar (SLO)	(UAE Team Emirates)
	Third	Alexey Lutsenko (KAZ)	(Astana)
Jersey awarded to the points classification winner	Points	Caleb Ewan (AUS)	(Lotto–Soudal)
Jersey awarded to the young rider classification winner	Young rider	Tadej Pogačar (SLO)	(UAE Team Emirates)
Jersey awarded to the sprints classification winner	Sprints	Veljko Stojnić (SRB)	(Vini Zabù–KTM)
	Team	UAE Team Emirates	

The 2020 UAE Tour was a road cycling stage race that took place between 23 and 27 February 2020 in the United Arab Emirates (initially scheduled to take place between the 23 and 29 February). It was the second edition of the UAE Tour and the third race of the 2020 UCI World Tour.

The race was held during the COVID-19 pandemic, and following the fifth stage, two staff members of one of the teams tested positive for COVID-19. In response, the local authorities quarantined and tested all participants, including riders, organisers and team members, and cancelled the remaining two stages. As of March 3, 2020, most teams had left the country and returned to their normal early season schedules, but some teams were still being held within the UAE with very little explanation or assurances. They were eventually told they would be allowed to leave their hotel on March 14.

The race was consequently won by British rider Adam Yates of Mitchelton–Scott, who was leading the race prior to the cancellation. Yates took the race leader's jersey following the third stage, one of the two mountain-top finishes on Jebel Hafeet, taking a clear stage victory with over a minute's advantage over Tadej Pogačar (UAE Team Emirates) and maintained his lead during the second mountainous stage, won by Pogačar, who was ultimately classified second in the general classification and took the white jersey for the young riders' classification. Alexey Lutsenko of Astana completed the podium, over a minute and a half behind Yates, thanks to strong finishes on the two mountainous stages.

Among the race's other jerseys, in addition to Pogačar taking the young rider's classification, Caleb Ewan of Lotto–Soudal collected the most points in the points classification thanks to a win on the second stage and consistently high finishes on the other flat stages. The sprints classification was won by Veljko Stojnić of Vini Zabù–KTM, whilst thanks to the high placings of Pogačar, Diego Ulissi and Davide Formolo, UAE Team Emirates took the teams classification, finishing over three minutes ahead of the second best team, Astana.

== Teams ==
Twenty teams were invited to the event, including eighteen of the nineteen UCI WorldTeams and two UCI Professional Continental teams. Each team consisted of seven riders for a total of 140 riders, of which 133 finished.

UCI WorldTeams

- AG2R La Mondiale
- Astana
- Bahrain–McLaren
- Bora–Hansgrohe
- CCC Team
- Cofidis
- Deceuninck–Quick-Step
- Groupama–FDJ
- Israel Start-Up Nation
- Lotto–Soudal
- Mitchelton–Scott
- Movistar Team
- NTT Pro Cycling
- Team INEOS
- Team Jumbo–Visma
- Team Sunweb
- Trek–Segafredo
- UAE Team Emirates

UCI Professional Continental teams

- Gazprom–RusVelo
- Vini Zabù–KTM

== Route ==
Stages
Stage	Date	Course	Distance	Type	Stage winner
1	23 February	The Pointe at Palm Jumeirah to Dubai Silicon Oasis	148 km (92 mi)	Flat stage	Pascal Ackermann (GER)
2	24 February	Hatta to Hatta Dam	168 km (104 mi)	Hilly stage	Caleb Ewan (AUS)
3	25 February	Al Qudrah Cycle Track to Jebel Hafeet	184 km (114 mi)	Mountain stage	Adam Yates (GBR)
4	26 February	Zabeel Park to Dubai City Walk	173 km (107 mi)	Flat stage	Dylan Groenewegen (NED)
5	27 February	Al Ain to Jebel Hafeet	162 km (101 mi)	Mountain stage	Tadej Pogačar (SLO)
6	28 February	Al Ruwais to Al Mirfa	158 km (98 mi)	Flat stage	Cancelled (Note: The stage was cancelled by the Abu Dhabi Sports Council when two staff members tested positive for COVID-19.)
7	29 February	Al Maryah Island to Abu Dhabi	127 km (79 mi)	Flat stage	Cancelled (Note: Stage cancelled by local authorities following positive tests for the SARS-CoV-2 virus, responsible for the Coronavirus disease 2019, from two staff members.)
Total		~~1,120 km (700 mi)~~ 835 km (519 mi)			

== Stages ==
=== Stage 1 ===
23 February 2020 – The Pointe at Palm Jumeirah to Dubai Silicon Oasis, 148 km (92 mi)

Stage 1 Result
Rank	Rider	Team	Time
1	Pascal Ackermann (GER)	Bora–Hansgrohe	3h 29' 19"
2	Caleb Ewan (AUS)	Lotto–Soudal	+ 0"
3	Rudy Barbier (FRA)	Israel Start-Up Nation	+ 0"
4	Dylan Groenewegen (NED)	Team Jumbo–Visma	+ 0"
5	Luka Mezgec (SLO)	Mitchelton–Scott	+ 0"
6	Alberto Dainese (ITA)	Team Sunweb	+ 0"
7	Jakub Mareczko (ITA)	CCC Team	+ 0"
8	Max Walscheid (GER)	NTT Pro Cycling	+ 0"
9	José Joaquín Rojas (ESP)	Movistar Team	+ 0"
10	Andrea Vendrame (ITA)	AG2R La Mondiale	+ 0"

General classification after Stage 1
Rank	Rider	Team	Time
1	Pascal Ackermann (GER)	Bora–Hansgrohe	3h 29' 09"
2	Caleb Ewan (AUS)	Lotto–Soudal	+ 4"
3	Veljko Stojnić (SRB)	Vini Zabù–KTM	+ 5"
4	Rudy Barbier (FRA)	Israel Start-Up Nation	+ 6"
5	Leonardo Tortomasi (ITA)	Vini Zabù–KTM	+ 6"
6	Nikolay Cherkasov (RUS)	Gazprom–RusVelo	+ 7"
7	Dylan Groenewegen (NED)	Team Jumbo–Visma	+ 10"
8	Luka Mezgec (SLO)	Mitchelton–Scott	+ 10"
9	Alberto Dainese (ITA)	Team Sunweb	+ 10"
10	Jakub Mareczko (ITA)	CCC Team	+ 10"

=== Stage 2 ===
24 February 2020 – Hatta to Hatta Dam, 168 km (104 mi)

Stage 2 Result
Rank	Rider	Team	Time
1	Caleb Ewan (AUS)	Lotto–Soudal	4h 18' 16"
2	Sam Bennett (IRL)	Deceuninck–Quick-Step	+ 2"
3	Arnaud Démare (FRA)	Groupama–FDJ	+ 4"
4	Diego Ulissi (ITA)	UAE Team Emirates	+ 4"
5	Rick Zabel (GER)	Israel Start-Up Nation	+ 4"
6	Andrea Vendrame (ITA)	AG2R La Mondiale	+ 4"
7	Luka Mezgec (SLO)	Mitchelton–Scott	+ 4"
8	Adam Yates (GBR)	Mitchelton–Scott	+ 4"
9	Tadej Pogačar (SLO)	UAE Team Emirates	+ 4"
10	David Gaudu (FRA)	Groupama–FDJ	+ 4"

General classification after Stage 2
Rank	Rider	Team	Time
1	Caleb Ewan (AUS)	Lotto–Soudal	7h 47' 19"
2	Sam Bennett (IRL)	Deceuninck–Quick-Step	+ 12"
3	Arnaud Démare (FRA)	Groupama–FDJ	+ 16"
4	Nikolay Cherkasov (RUS)	Gazprom–RusVelo	+ 17"
5	Alexey Lutsenko (KAZ)	Astana	+ 19"
6	Luka Mezgec (SLO)	Mitchelton–Scott	+ 20"
7	Andrea Vendrame (ITA)	AG2R La Mondiale	+ 20"
8	Rick Zabel (GER)	Israel Start-Up Nation	+ 20"
9	Wilco Kelderman (NED)	Team Sunweb	+ 20"
10	David Gaudu (FRA)	Groupama–FDJ	+ 20"

=== Stage 3 ===
25 February 2020 – Al Qudrah Cycle Track to Jebel Hafeet, 184 km (114 mi)

Stage 3 Result
Rank	Rider	Team	Time
1	Adam Yates (GBR)	Mitchelton–Scott	4h 42' 33"
2	Tadej Pogačar (SLO)	UAE Team Emirates	+ 1' 03"
3	Alexey Lutsenko (KAZ)	Astana	+ 1' 30"
4	David Gaudu (FRA)	Groupama–FDJ	+ 1' 30"
5	Rafał Majka (POL)	Bora–Hansgrohe	+ 1' 30"
6	Diego Ulissi (ITA)	UAE Team Emirates	+ 1' 56"
7	Patrick Konrad (AUT)	Bora–Hansgrohe	+ 1' 56"
8	Gorka Izagirre (ESP)	Astana	+ 1' 56"
9	Jesús Herrada (ESP)	Cofidis	+ 1' 56"
10	Eddie Dunbar (IRL)	Team INEOS	+ 1' 56"

General classification after Stage 3
Rank	Rider	Team	Time
1	Adam Yates (GBR)	Mitchelton–Scott	12h 30' 02"
2	Tadej Pogačar (SLO)	UAE Team Emirates	+ 1' 07"
3	Alexey Lutsenko (KAZ)	Astana	+ 1' 35"
4	David Gaudu (FRA)	Groupama–FDJ	+ 1' 40"
5	Rafał Majka (POL)	Bora–Hansgrohe	+ 1' 40"
6	Wilco Kelderman (NED)	Team Sunweb	+ 2' 06"
7	Diego Ulissi (ITA)	UAE Team Emirates	+ 2' 06"
8	Patrick Konrad (AUT)	Bora–Hansgrohe	+ 2' 06"
9	Jesús Herrada (ESP)	Cofidis	+ 2' 06"
10	Eddie Dunbar (IRL)	Team INEOS	+ 2' 06"

=== Stage 4 ===
26 February 2020 – Zabeel Park to Dubai City Walk, 173 km (107 mi)

Stage 4 Result
Rank	Rider	Team	Time
1	Dylan Groenewegen (NED)	Team Jumbo–Visma	4h 16' 13"
2	Fernando Gaviria (COL)	UAE Team Emirates	+ 0"
3	Pascal Ackermann (GER)	Bora–Hansgrohe	+ 0"
4	Sam Bennett (IRL)	Deceuninck–Quick-Step	+ 0"
5	Caleb Ewan (AUS)	Lotto–Soudal	+ 0"
6	Kaden Groves (AUS)	Mitchelton–Scott	+ 0"
7	Jakub Mareczko (ITA)	CCC Team	+ 0"
8	Attilio Viviani (ITA)	Cofidis	+ 0"
9	Rudy Barbier (FRA)	Israel Start-Up Nation	+ 0"
10	Max Walscheid (GER)	NTT Pro Cycling	+ 0"

General classification after Stage 4
Rank	Rider	Team	Time
1	Adam Yates (GBR)	Mitchelton–Scott	16h 46' 15"
2	Tadej Pogačar (SLO)	UAE Team Emirates	+ 1' 07"
3	Alexey Lutsenko (KAZ)	Astana	+ 1' 35"
4	David Gaudu (FRA)	Groupama–FDJ	+ 1' 40"
5	Rafał Majka (POL)	Bora–Hansgrohe	+ 1' 40"
6	Jesús Herrada (ESP)	Cofidis	+ 2' 05"
7	Wilco Kelderman (NED)	Team Sunweb	+ 2' 06"
8	Diego Ulissi (ITA)	UAE Team Emirates	+ 2' 06"
9	Patrick Konrad (AUT)	Bora–Hansgrohe	+ 2' 06"
10	Eddie Dunbar (IRL)	Team INEOS	+ 2' 06"

=== Stage 5 ===
27 February 2020 – Al Ain to Jebel Hafeet, 162 km (101 mi)

Stage 5 Result
Rank	Rider	Team	Time
1	Tadej Pogačar (SLO)	UAE Team Emirates	3h 48' 53"
2	Alexey Lutsenko (KAZ)	Astana	+ 0"
3	Adam Yates (GBR)	Mitchelton–Scott	+ 0"
4	David Gaudu (FRA)	Groupama–FDJ	+ 4"
5	Ilnur Zakarin (RUS)	CCC Team	+ 7"
6	Davide Formolo (ITA)	UAE Team Emirates	+ 23"
7	Alejandro Valverde (ESP)	Movistar Team	+ 23"
8	Wilco Kelderman (NED)	Team Sunweb	+ 24"
9	Víctor de la Parte (ESP)	CCC Team	+ 24"
10	Rafał Majka (POL)	Bora–Hansgrohe	+ 27"

General classification after Stage 5
Rank	Rider	Team	Time
1	Adam Yates (GBR)	Mitchelton–Scott	20h 35' 04"
2	Tadej Pogačar (SLO)	UAE Team Emirates	+ 1' 01"
3	Alexey Lutsenko (KAZ)	Astana	+ 1' 33"
4	David Gaudu (FRA)	Groupama–FDJ	+ 1' 48"
5	Rafał Majka (POL)	Bora–Hansgrohe	+ 2' 11"
6	Wilco Kelderman (NED)	Team Sunweb	+ 2' 34"
7	Ilnur Zakarin (RUS)	CCC Team	+ 2' 34"
8	Davide Formolo (ITA)	UAE Team Emirates	+ 2' 39"
9	Diego Ulissi (ITA)	UAE Team Emirates	+ 2' 47"
10	Víctor de la Parte (ESP)	CCC Team	+ 2' 51"

=== Stage 6 ===
28 February 2020 – Al Ruwais to Al Mirfa, 158 km (98 mi)

The stage was cancelled by local authorities when two staff members tested positive for COVID-19.

=== Stage 7 ===
29 February 2020 – Al Maryah Island to Abu Dhabi, 127 km (79 mi)

The stage was cancelled by local authorities when two staff members tested positive for COVID-19.

== Classification leadership table ==
Classification leadership by stage
Stage	Winner	General classification	Points classification	Sprints classification	Youth classification	Team classification
1	Pascal Ackermann	Pascal Ackermann	Pascal Ackermann	Veljko Stojnić	Veljko Stojnić	Israel Start-Up Nation
2	Caleb Ewan	Caleb Ewan	Caleb Ewan	Veljko Stojnić	Nikolay Cherkasov	Deceuninck–Quick-Step
3	Adam Yates	Adam Yates	Caleb Ewan	Veljko Stojnić	Tadej Pogačar	UAE Team Emirates
4	Dylan Groenewegen	Adam Yates	Caleb Ewan	Veljko Stojnić	Tadej Pogačar	UAE Team Emirates
5	Tadej Pogačar	Adam Yates	Caleb Ewan	Veljko Stojnić	Tadej Pogačar	UAE Team Emirates
6	Cancelled					
7	Cancelled					
Final		Adam Yates	Caleb Ewan	Veljko Stojnić	Tadej Pogačar	UAE Team Emirates

== Classification standings ==
=== General classification ===
Final general classification (1–10)
Rank	Rider	Team	Time
1	Adam Yates (GBR)	Mitchelton–Scott	20h 35' 04"
2	Tadej Pogačar (SLO)	UAE Team Emirates	+ 1' 01"
3	Alexey Lutsenko (KAZ)	Astana	+ 1' 33"
4	David Gaudu (FRA)	Groupama–FDJ	+ 1' 48"
5	Rafał Majka (POL)	Bora–Hansgrohe	+ 2' 11"
6	Wilco Kelderman (NED)	Team Sunweb	+ 2' 34"
7	Ilnur Zakarin (RUS)	CCC Team	+ 2' 34"
8	Davide Formolo (ITA)	UAE Team Emirates	+ 2' 39"
9	Diego Ulissi (ITA)	UAE Team Emirates	+ 2' 47"
10	Víctor de la Parte (ESP)	CCC Team	+ 2' 51"

=== Points classification ===
Final points classification (1–10)
Rank	Rider	Team	Points
1	Caleb Ewan (AUS)	Lotto–Soudal	43
2	Veljko Stojnić (SRB)	Vini Zabù–KTM	42
3	Tadej Pogačar (SLO)	UAE Team Emirates	39
4	Adam Yates (GBR)	Mitchelton–Scott	35
5	Alexey Lutsenko (KAZ)	Astana	33
6	Pascal Ackermann (GER)	Bora–Hansgrohe	32
7	Dylan Groenewegen (NED)	Team Jumbo–Visma	29
8	Sam Bennett (IRL)	Deceuninck–Quick-Step	25
9	Leonardo Tortomasi (ITA)	Vini Zabù–KTM	21
10	David Gaudu (FRA)	Groupama–FDJ	19

=== Sprints classification ===
Final sprints classification (1–10)
Rank	Rider	Team	Points
1	Veljko Stojnić (SRB)	Vini Zabù–KTM	42
2	Leonardo Tortomasi (ITA)	Vini Zabù–KTM	21
3	Cristian Scaroni (ITA)	Gazprom–RusVelo	18
4	Andrea Garosio (ITA)	Vini Zabù–KTM	13
5	Will Clarke (AUS)	Trek–Segafredo	13
6	Jasper De Buyst (BEL)	Lotto–Soudal	10
7	Victor Campenaerts (BEL)	NTT Pro Cycling	9
8	Umberto Marengo (ITA)	Vini Zabù–KTM	9
9	Nikolay Cherkasov (RUS)	Gazprom–RusVelo	8
10	Stijn Steels (BEL)	Deceuninck–Quick-Step	6

=== Young rider classification ===
Final young rider classification (1–10)
Rank	Rider	Team	Time
1	Tadej Pogačar (SLO)	UAE Team Emirates	20h 36' 05"
2	David Gaudu (FRA)	Groupama–FDJ	+ 47"
3	Eddie Dunbar (IRL)	Team INEOS	+ 1' 57"
4	Niklas Eg (DEN)	Trek–Segafredo	+ 2' 35"
5	Óscar Rodríguez (ESP)	Astana	+ 4' 16"
6	Jaakko Hänninen (FIN)	AG2R La Mondiale	+ 4' 44"
7	Jai Hindley (AUS)	Team Sunweb	+ 5' 19"
8	Héctor Carretero (ESP)	Movistar Team	+ 5' 39"
9	Florian Stork (GER)	Team Sunweb	+ 6' 44"
10	Lorenzo Fortunato (ITA)	Vini Zabù–KTM	+ 10' 22"

=== Teams classification ===
Final teams classification (1–10)
Rank	Team	Time
1	UAE Team Emirates	61h 51' 55"
2	Astana	+ 3' 25"
3	CCC Team	+ 5' 22"
4	Trek–Segafredo	+ 7' 04"
5	AG2R La Mondiale	+ 7' 55"
6	Team Sunweb	+ 9' 26"
7	Movistar Team	+ 10' 27"
8	Cofidis	+ 11' 56"
9	Bora–Hansgrohe	+ 12' 38"
10	Bahrain–McLaren	+ 14' 24"
