= Bert Van Lerberghe =

Belgian road cyclist

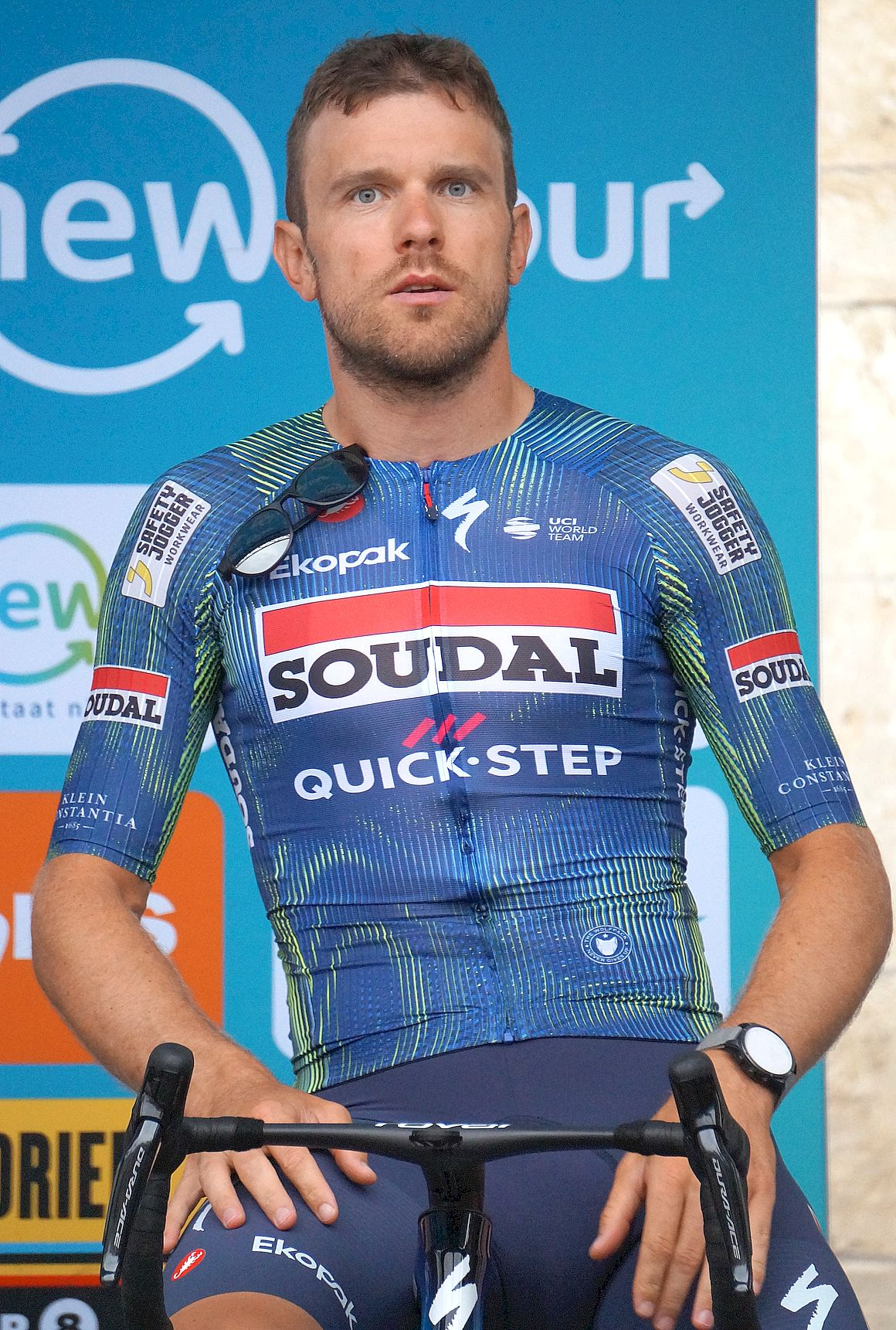
- Van Lerberghe in 2026

Personal information
- Full name: Bert Van Lerberghe
- Born: 29 September 1992 (age 34) Kortrijk, Flanders, Belgium
- Height: 190 cm (6 ft 3 in)
- Weight: 85 kg (187 lb)

Cycling career
- Sport: Cycling
- Current team: Soudal–Quick-Step
- Discipline: Road
- Role: Rider

Amateur teams
- 2009–2010: Balen BC
- 2011: Ovyta–Eijssen–Acrog
- 2012–2013: Jong Vlaanderen
- 2014: EFC–Omega Pharma–Quick Step

Professional teams
- 2015–2017: Topsport Vlaanderen–Baloise
- 2018–2019: Cofidis
- 2020–: Deceuninck–Quick-Step

Bert Van Lerberghe (born 29 September 1992) is a Belgian professional racing cyclist, who currently rides for UCI WorldTeam Soudal–Quick-Step. He won the combativity classification in the 2016 Eneco Tour.

In August 2019, it was announced that Van Lerberghe would move up to UCI World Tour level, having signed a two-year contract with Deceuninck–Quick-Step.

== Major results ==
2009
4th Overall Sint-Martinusprijs Kontich

1st Stage 4

2010
1st Prologue Sint-Martinusprijs Kontich
2nd Tour of Flanders juniors
2012
5th Overall Tour du Loir-et-Cher

1st Young rider classification

6th Grote Prijs Stad Geel
8th Kattekoers
2013
10th Overall Le Triptyque des Monts et Châteaux
10th Grand Prix de la ville de Nogent-sur-Oise
2014
2nd Road race, National Under-23 Road Championships
2nd Grand Prix Criquielion
8th Grand Prix de la ville de Pérenchies
9th Overall Le Triptyque des Monts et Châteaux
2015
4th Antwerpse Havenpijl
5th Arnhem–Veenendaal Classic
5th Kattekoers
6th De Kustpijl
7th Velothon Berlin
10th Paris–Bourges
10th Omloop van het Houtland
2016
2nd De Kustpijl
4th Handzame Classic
5th Grand Prix Criquielion
6th Kampioenschap van Vlaanderen
10th Münsterland Giro
10th Heistse Pijl
2017
2nd Ronde van Overijssel
2nd Omloop Eurometropool
3rd Paris–Troyes
5th Nokere Koerse
6th Grote Prijs Marcel Kint
6th Omloop van het Houtland
7th Arnhem–Veenendaal Classic
8th Nationale Sluitingsprijs
9th Le Samyn
9th Grand Prix de Denain
2018
7th Omloop Het Nieuwsblad
8th Brussels Cycling Classic
2020
7th Three Days of Bruges–De Panne
2021
4th Heistse Pijl
9th Kuurne–Brussels–Kuurne
2022
4th Nokere Koerse
8th Le Samyn
10th Bredene Koksijde Classic
2023
1st Stage 2 (TTT) UAE Tour

=== Grand Tour general classification results timeline ===
Grand Tour	2021	2022	2023	2024	2025
Giro d'Italia	—	146	—	135	—
Tour de France	—	—	—	—	
Vuelta a España	137	—	—	—	

Legend
—	Did not compete
DNF	Did not finish
IP	In progress
