= Naesen =

Naesen is a surname. Notable people with the surname include:

- Lawrence Naesen (born 1992), Belgian cyclist
- Oliver Naesen (born 1990), Belgian cyclist
