= Boy van Poppel =

Dutch racing cyclist (born 1988)

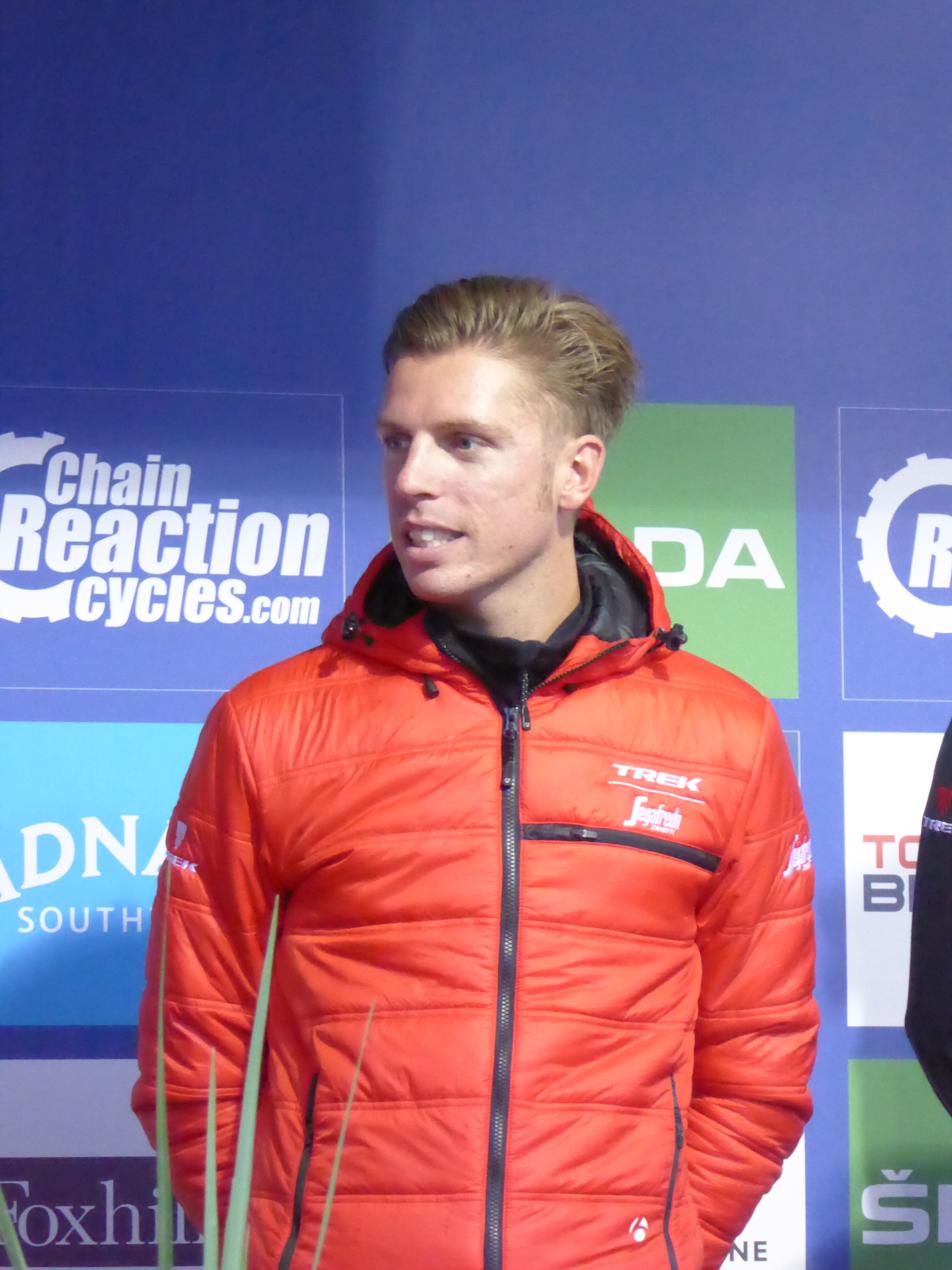
- Van Poppel at the 2016 Tour of Britain.

Personal information
- Full name: Boy van Poppel
- Born: 18 January 1988 (age 38) Utrecht, the Netherlands
- Height: 1.85 m (6 ft 1 in)
- Weight: 77 kg (170 lb)

Cycling career
- Sport: Cycling
- Current team: Retired
- Disciplines: Road; Cyclo-cross (former)
- Role: Rider
- Rider type: Sprinter; Lead-out man

Professional teams
- 2006–2010: Rabobank Continental Team
- 2011–2012: UnitedHealthcare
- 2013: Vacansoleil–DCM
- 2014–2018: Trek Factory Racing
- 2019: Roompot–Charles
- 2020–2024: Circus–Wanty Gobert

Boy van Poppel (born 18 January 1988) is a Dutch former road racing cyclist, who competed as a professional from 2006 to 2024. He is the son of former cyclists Jean-Paul van Poppel and Leontine van der Lienden.

== Professional career ==
On 12 September 2008, Utrecht-born van Poppel made a name for himself at the Tour of Missouri, winning the fifth stage. With that victory, he handed Mark Cavendish his first 'defeat' in a bunch sprint since the Giro d'Italia held in May. In the 2012 Tour of Britain, van Poppel finished consistently in the top ten in numerous stages, which helped him secure the Points Classification jersey before second-placed Mark Cavendish.

In late 2012, van Poppel signed a contract for the 2013 season with Vacansoleil–DCM, becoming the third member of his family to be part of the squad; his brother Danny van Poppel also joined the team for the 2013 season as a first-year professional, while his father Jean-Paul van Poppel worked as a directeur sportif for the team.

Van Poppel joined Trek Factory Racing for the 2014 season, after his previous team – Vacansoleil–DCM – folded at the end of the 2013 season. He was named in the start list for the 2015 Vuelta a España.

== Major results ==
=== Cyclo-cross ===
2004–2005
1st National Junior Championships
3rd Junior Koksijde
2005–2006
1st UCI World Junior Championships
1st National Junior Championships
Junior Superprestige

1st Gieten
1st Hoogstraten
2nd Vorselaar

1st Junior Lille
1st Junior Loenhout
1st Junior Overijse
3rd Overall UCI Junior World Cup

2nd Hooglede-Gits
2nd Liévin
2nd Hoogerheide

2nd Junior Essen
2nd Junior Hofstade
2nd Junior Oostmalle
2006–2007
3rd National Under-23 Championships
3rd Under-23 Pijnacker
2007–2008
1st National Under-23 Championships
Under-23 Gazet van Antwerpen

1st Loenhout

2008–2009
1st National Under-23 Championships

=== Road ===
2006
2nd Road race, National Junior Championships
10th Road race, UEC European Junior Championships
2008
1st Stage 5 Tour of Missouri
9th Omloop van het Waasland
9th Ronde van Overijssel
2009
1st Stage 3 Tour de Normandie
1st Prologue (TTT) Olympia's Tour
2nd Schaal Sels
3rd Road race, National Under-23 Championships
8th Antwerpse Havenpijl
9th Omloop van het Waasland
2010
1st Stage 4 Kreiz Breizh Elites
5th Châteauroux Classic
6th Zellik–Galmaarden
10th Dwars door Drenthe
2011
5th Overall Ronde van Drenthe
2012
3rd Nokere Koerse
7th Overall Tour of Britain

1st Points classification

8th Handzame Classic
2013
6th Vattenfall Cyclassics
6th Amstel Curaçao Race
2014
8th Halle–Ingooigem
2017
9th Overall Three Days of De Panne
2018
7th Grand Prix de Fourmies
7th Omloop van het Houtland
2019
3rd Grand Prix de Fourmies
4th Nokere Koerse
5th Ronde van Limburg
2021
5th Road race, National Championships
7th Dwars door het Hageland
7th Heistse Pijl
8th Ronde van Limburg

==== Grand Tour general classification results timeline ====
Grand Tour	2013	2014	2015	2016	2017	2018	2019	2020	2021	2022	2023
Giro d'Italia	—	131	146	DNF	—	137	—	—	—	—	—
Tour de France	144	—	—	—	—	—	—	—	117	—	—
Vuelta a España	—	—	158	—	—	—	—	—	—	DNF	124

Legend
—	Did not compete
DNF	Did not finish
