= Rudy Barbier =

French cyclist (born 1992)

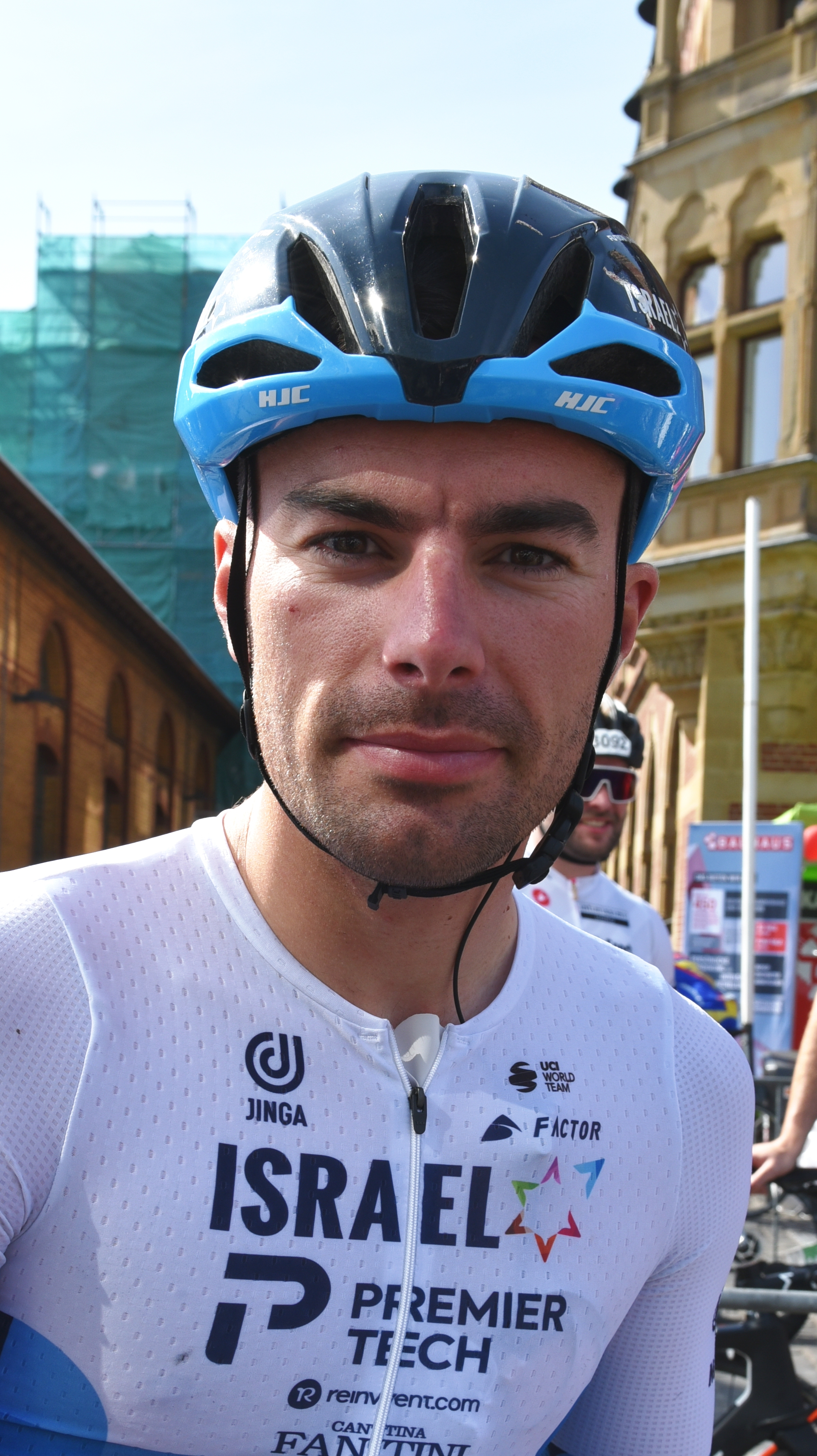
- Barbier in 2022

Personal information
- Full name: Rudy Barbier
- Born: 18 December 1992 (age 33) Beauvais, France
- Height: 1.79 m (5 ft 10 in)
- Weight: 78 kg (172 lb)

Cycling career
- Sport: Cycling
- Current team: Philippe Wagner–Bazin
- Discipline: Road
- Role: Rider
- Rider type: Sprinter

Amateur teams
- 2010: CC Wasquehal
- 2011–2012: USSA Pavilly Barentin
- 2013: Armée de Terre

Professional teams
- 2012: Bridgestone–Anchor (stagiaire)
- 2013: Roubaix–Lille Métropole (stagiaire)
- 2014–2016: Roubaix–Lille Métropole
- 2017–2018: AG2R La Mondiale
- 2019–2022: Israel Cycling Academy
- 2023: St. Michel–Mavic–Auber93
- 2024–: Philippe Wagner–Bazin

Rudy Barbier (born 18 December 1992) is a French cyclist, who currently rides for UCI Continental team Philippe Wagner–Bazin. He is the brother of fellow racing cyclist Pierre Barbier. In October 2020, he was named in the startlist for the 2020 Giro d'Italia.

== Major results ==
2012
5th Val d'Ille Classic
2013
4th Overall Paris–Arras Tour

1st Young rider classification
1st Stage 2

6th Paris–Bourges
9th Paris–Mantes-en-Yvelines
2014
2nd Overall Paris–Arras Tour

1st Young rider classification
1st Stage 1 (TTT)

2nd Overall Ronde de l'Oise
5th Overall Tour de Picardie
8th Grand Prix de Fourmies
9th Grand Prix Pino Cerami
2015
1st Stage 1 Circuit des Ardennes
3rd Grand Prix de Denain
4th Overall World Ports Classic

1st Young rider classification

7th Overall Ronde de l'Oise
7th La Roue Tourangelle
7th Grand Prix de la ville de Pérenchies
9th Overall Tour de Picardie
9th Paris–Chauny
2016
1st Paris–Troyes
1st Cholet-Pays de Loire
2nd Grand Prix de la ville de Pérenchies
3rd Paris–Bourges
4th Gooikse Pijl
5th Grand Prix de la Somme
5th Grand Prix d'Isbergues
7th Polynormande
7th Tour de Vendée
9th La Roue Tourangelle
2017
1st Paris–Bourges
2nd Grand Prix de la Somme
4th Omloop Eurometropool
5th Grand Prix d'Isbergues
6th Scheldeprijs
7th Kampioenschap van Vlaanderen
9th London–Surrey Classic
10th EuroEyes Cyclassics
2018
10th London–Surrey Classic
2019
1st Classic Loire Atlantique
3rd Overall Tour of Estonia

1st Stage 1

5th Cholet-Pays de la Loire
7th Grand Prix de la Somme
10th Bredene Koksijde Classic
2020
1st Stage 1 Vuelta a San Juan
1st Stage 4 Okolo Slovenska
8th Clásica de Almería
2021
6th Gooikse Pijl
10th Nokere Koerse
2022
5th Elfstedenronde
2023
1st Stage 2 Tour de Bretagne
5th Le Tour des 100 Communes

=== Grand Tour general classification results timeline ===
Grand Tour	2020
Giro d'Italia	DNF
Tour de France	—
Vuelta a España	—

Legend
—	Did not compete
DNF	Did not finish
