= 2022 Bredene Koksijde Classic =

2022 UCI ProSeries

Race details
- Dates: 18 March 2022
- Stages: 1
- Distance: 200.9 km (124.8 mi)
- Winning time: 4h 29' 30"

Results
| | Winner | Pascal Ackermann (GER) | (UAE Team Emirates) |
| | Second | Hugo Hofstetter (FRA) | (Arkéa–Samsic) |
| | Third | Tim Merlier (BEL) | (Alpecin–Fenix) |

The 2022 Bredene Koksijde Classic was the 19th edition of the Bredene Koksijde Classic road cycling one day race, which was held on 18 March 2022, starting and finishing in the titular towns of Bredene and Koksijde, respectively.

== Teams ==
Nine UCI WorldTeams, nine UCI ProTeams, and two UCI Continental teams made up the twenty teams that participated in the race.

UCI WorldTeams

- Bora–Hansgrohe
- Cofidis
- Quick-Step Alpha Vinyl Team
- Intermarché–Wanty–Gobert Matériaux
- Israel–Premier Tech
- Team DSM
- Lotto–Soudal
- Trek–Segafredo
- UAE Team Emirates

UCI ProTeams

- Alpecin–Fenix
- Arkéa–Samsic
- B&B Hotels–KTM
- Bardiani–CSF–Faizanè
- Bingoal Pauwels Sauces WB
- Human Powered Health
- Sport Vlaanderen–Baloise
- Team TotalEnergies
- Uno-X Pro Cycling Team

UCI Continental Teams

- Minerva Cycling Team
- Tarteletto–Isorex

== Result ==
Result
| Rank | Rider | Team | Time |
|---|---|---|---|
| 1 | Pascal Ackermann (GER) | UAE Team Emirates | 4h 29' 30" |
| 2 | Hugo Hofstetter (FRA) | Arkéa–Samsic | + 0" |
| 3 | Tim Merlier (BEL) | Alpecin–Fenix | + 0" |
| 4 | Sam Welsford (AUS) | Team DSM | + 0" |
| 5 | Gerben Thijssen (BEL) | Intermarché–Wanty–Gobert Matériaux | + 0" |
| 6 | Timothy Dupont (BEL) | Bingoal Pauwels Sauces WB | + 0" |
| 7 | Søren Wærenskjold (NOR) | Uno-X Pro Cycling Team | + 0" |
| 8 | Luca Mozzato (ITA) | B&B Hotels–KTM | + 0" |
| 9 | Arnaud De Lie (BEL) | Lotto–Soudal | + 0" |
| 10 | Bert Van Lerberghe (BEL) | Quick-Step Alpha Vinyl Team | + 0" |
