= 2018 Brussels Cycling Classic =

2018 UCI Europe Tour
- Event poster with previous winner Arnaud Démare

Race details
- Dates: 1 September 2019
- Stages: 1
- Distance: 201.4 km (125.1 mi)
- Winning time: 4h 35' 12"

Results
	Winner	Pascal Ackermann (GER)	(Bora–Hansgrohe)
	Second	Jasper Stuyven (BEL)	(Trek–Segafredo)
	Third	Thomas Boudat (FRA)	(Direct Énergie)

The 2018 Brussels Cycling Classic was the 98th edition of the Brussels Cycling Classic road cycling one day race. It was held on 1 September 2018 as part of the 2018 UCI Europe Tour as a 1.HC event.

== Teams ==
Twenty-four teams participated in the race, of which eight were UCI WorldTour teams, fifteen were UCI Professional Continental teams, and one was a UCI Continental Team. Each team entered seven riders with the exceptions of Fortuneo–Samsic, Israel Cycling Academy, and Nippo–Vini Fantini–Europa Ovini, who each entered six riders, meaning the race started with a peloton of 165 riders. Of these riders, 129 riders finished and 36 did not.

UCI WorldTeams

- AG2R La Mondiale
- Astana
- Bora–Hansgrohe
- Groupama–FDJ
- Lotto–Soudal
- Quick-Step Floors
- Trek–Segafredo
- UAE Team Emirates

UCI Professional Continental Teams

- CCC–Sprandi–Polkowice
- Cibel–Cebon
- Cofidis
- Delko–Marseille Provence KTM
- Direct Énergie
- Fortuneo–Samsic
- Israel Cycling Academy
- Nippo–Vini Fantini–Europa Ovini
- Roompot–Nederlandse Loterij
- Sport Vlaanderen–Baloise
- Vérandas Willems–Crelan
- Vital Concept
- WB Aqua Protect Veranclassic
- Wanty–Groupe Gobert
- Wilier Triestina–Selle Italia

UCI Continental Teams

- Development Team Sunweb

== Results ==
Result
Rank	Rider	Team	Time
1	Pascal Ackermann (GER)	Bora–Hansgrohe	4h 35' 12"
2	Jasper Stuyven (BEL)	Trek–Segafredo	+ 0"
3	Thomas Boudat (FRA)	Direct Énergie	+ 1"
4	Florian Sénéchal (FRA)	Quick-Step Floors	+ 1"
5	Juan José Lobato (ESP)	Nippo–Vini Fantini–Europa Ovini	+ 1"
6	Lorrenzo Manzin (FRA)	Vital Concept	+ 1"
7	Kenny Dehaes (BEL)	WB Aqua Protect Veranclassic	+ 1"
8	Bert Van Lerberghe (BEL)	Cofidis	+ 1"
9	Timothy Dupont (BEL)	Wanty–Groupe Gobert	+ 1"
10	Jonas Koch (GER)	CCC–Sprandi–Polkowice	+ 1"
