= 2019 Bredene Koksijde Classic =

2019 UCI Europe Tour

Race details
- Dates: 22 March 2019
- Stages: 1
- Distance: 199.5 km (124.0 mi)
- Winning time: 4h 35' 47"

Results
	Winner	Pascal Ackermann (GER)	(Bora–Hansgrohe)
	Second	Kristoffer Halvorsen (NOR)	(Team Sky)
	Third	Álvaro Hodeg (COL)	(Deceuninck–Quick-Step)

The 2019 Bredene Koksijde Classic was the 17th edition of the Bredene Koksijde Classic road cycling one day race and the first edition of the rebranded Handzame Classic. It was held on 22 March 2019, starting and finishing in the titular towns of Bredene and Koksijde, respectively.

== Teams ==
Eight UCI WorldTeams, fourteen UCI Professional Continental teams, and one UCI Continental team made up the twenty-three teams that participated in the race. Each team could enter up to seven riders, but Team Katusha–Alpecin, Team Sky, and Trek–Segafredo each entered five, while Corendon–Circus entered six. Of the 154 riders who entered the race, there were 137 finishers and two non-starters.

UCI WorldTeams

- Bora–Hansgrohe
- CCC Team
- Deceuninck–Quick-Step
- Lotto–Soudal
- Team Katusha–Alpecin
- Team Sky
- Trek–Segafredo
- UAE Team Emirates

UCI Professional Continental Teams

- Androni Giocattoli–Sidermec
- Burgos BH
- Cofidis
- Corendon–Circus
- Delko–Marseille Provence
- Direct Énergie
- Hagens Berman Axeon
- Israel Cycling Academy
- Riwal Readynez
- Roompot–Charles
- Sport Vlaanderen–Baloise
- Vital Concept–B&B Hotels
- Wallonie Bruxelles
- Wanty–Gobert

UCI Continental Teams

- Cibel–Cebon

== Result ==
Result
Rank	Rider	Team	Time
1	Pascal Ackermann (GER)	Bora–Hansgrohe	4h 35' 47"
2	Kristoffer Halvorsen (NOR)	Team Sky	+ 0"
3	Álvaro Hodeg (COL)	Deceuninck–Quick-Step	+ 0"
4	Szymon Sajnok (POL)	CCC Team	+ 0"
5	Timothy Dupont (BEL)	Wanty–Gobert	+ 0"
6	Sasha Weemaes (BEL)	Sport Vlaanderen–Baloise	+ 0"
7	Lawrence Naesen (BEL)	Lotto–Soudal	+ 0"
8	Simone Consonni (ITA)	UAE Team Emirates	+ 0"
9	Thomas Boudat (FRA)	Direct Énergie	+ 0"
10	Rudy Barbier (FRA)	Israel Cycling Academy	+ 0"
