= 2020 Clásica de Almería =

2020 UCI Europe Tour 2020 UCI ProSeries

Race details
- Dates: 16 February 2020
- Stages: 1
- Distance: 187.6 km (116.6 mi)
- Winning time: 4h 24' 04"

Results
	Winner	Pascal Ackermann (GER)	(Bora–Hansgrohe)
	Second	Alexander Kristoff (NOR)	(UAE Team Emirates)
	Third	Elia Viviani (ITA)	(Cofidis)

The 2020 Clásica de Almería was the 35th edition of the Clásica de Almería road cycling one day race. It was held on 16 February 2020 as part of the UCI ProSeries in category 1.Pro. The race was won by defending champion Pascal Ackermann of Germany.

== Teams ==
Twenty teams of up to seven riders started the race:

UCI WorldTeams

- Mitchelton–Scott
- Movistar Team
- Bora–Hansgrohe
- Israel Start-Up Nation
- Cofidis
- Astana
- UAE Team Emirates
- AG2R La Mondiale

UCI Professional Continental teams

- Sport Vlaanderen–Baloise
- Gazprom–RusVelo
- Caja Rural–Seguros RGA
- Burgos BH
- Circus–Wanty Gobert
- B&B Hotels–Vital Concept
- Arkéa–Samsic
- Bingoal–Wallonie Bruxelles
- Fundación–Orbea
- Riwal Readynez

UCI Continental teams

- Equipo Kern Pharma
- Kometa Xstra Cycling Team

== Result ==
Race result
Rank	Rider	Team	Time
1	Pascal Ackermann (GER)	Bora–Hansgrohe	4h 24' 04"
2	Alexander Kristoff (NOR)	UAE Team Emirates	+ 0"
3	Elia Viviani (ITA)	Cofidis	+ 0"
4	Danny van Poppel (NED)	Circus–Wanty Gobert	+ 0"
5	Luka Mezgec (SLO)	Mitchelton–Scott	+ 0"
6	Amaury Capiot (BEL)	Sport Vlaanderen–Baloise	+ 0"
7	Clément Venturini (FRA)	AG2R La Mondiale	+ 0"
8	Rudy Barbier (FRA)	Israel Start-Up Nation	+ 0"
9	Juan José Lobato (ESP)	Fundación–Orbea	+ 0"
10	Thomas Boudat (FRA)	Arkéa–Samsic	+ 0"
