= 2018 Grand Prix de Fourmies =

2018 UCI Europe Tour

Race details
- Dates: 2 September 2018
- Stages: 1
- Distance: 205 km (127.4 mi)
- Winning time: 4h 46' 56"

Results
	Winner	Pascal Ackermann (GER)	(Bora–Hansgrohe)
	Second	Arnaud Démare (FRA)	(Groupama–FDJ)
	Third	Álvaro Hodeg (COL)	(Quick-Step Floors)

The 2018 Grand Prix de Fourmies was the 86th edition of the Grand Prix de Fourmies road cycling one day race. It was held on 2 September 2018 as part of UCI Europe Tour in category 1.HC.

== Teams ==
Twenty-two teams entered the race. Each team had a maximum of seven riders:

UCI WorldTeams

- AG2R La Mondiale
- Bora–Hansgrohe
- Quick-Step Floors
- UAE Team Emirates
- Astana
- Trek–Segafredo
- Groupama–FDJ

UCI Professional Continental teams

- Cofidis
- Direct Énergie
- Israel Cycling Academy
- Roompot–Nederlandse Loterij
- Vital Concept
- WB Aqua Protect Veranclassic
- Delko–Marseille Provence KTM
- Fortuneo–Samsic
- Nippo–Vini Fantini–Europa Ovini
- Sport Vlaanderen–Baloise
- Wanty–Groupe Gobert
- Wilier Triestina–Selle Italia

UCI Continental teams

- Amore & Vita–Prodir
- St. Michel–Auber93
- Roubaix–Lille Métropole

== Result ==
Result
Rank	Rider	Team	Time
1	Pascal Ackermann (GER)	Bora–Hansgrohe	4h 46' 56"
2	Arnaud Démare (FRA)	Groupama–FDJ	+ 0"
3	Álvaro Hodeg (COL)	Quick-Step Floors	+ 0"
4	Leonardo Bonifazio (ITA)	Nippo–Vini Fantini–Europa Ovini	+ 0"
5	Christophe Laporte (FRA)	Cofidis	+ 0"
6	Alexander Kristoff (NOR)	UAE Team Emirates	+ 0"
7	Boy van Poppel (NED)	Trek–Segafredo	+ 0"
8	Hugo Hofstetter (FRA)	Cofidis	+ 0"
9	Riccardo Minali (ITA)	Astana	+ 0"
10	Kristian Sbaragli (ITA)	Israel Cycling Academy	+ 0"
