= Thomas Boudat =

French bicycle racer (born 1994)

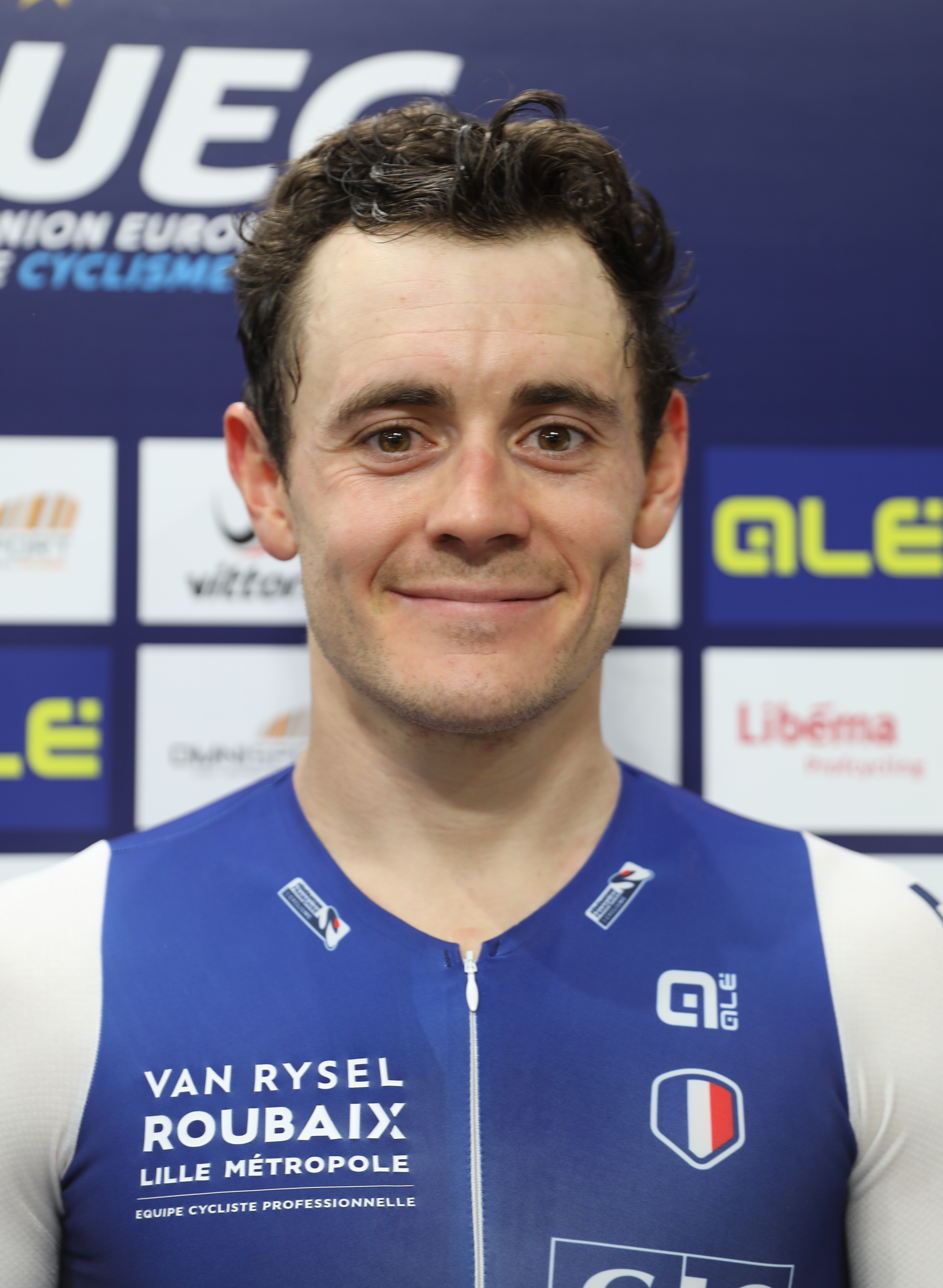
- Boudat (2024)

Personal information
- Born: 24 February 1994 (age 32) Langon, Gironde
- Height: 1.75 m (5 ft 9 in)
- Weight: 67 kg (148 lb)

Cycling career
- Sport: Cycling
- Current team: Retired
- Disciplines: Road; Track
- Role: Rider
- Rider type: Rouleur

Amateur teams
- 2011–2012: VC Pays de Langon Junior
- 2013–2014: Vendée U

Professional teams
- 2015–2019: Team Europcar
- 2020–2021: Arkéa–Samsic
- 2022–2024: Go Sport–Roubaix–Lille Métropole

Major wins
- Track World Championships Omnium (2014)
Medal record
Men's track cycling
Representing France
World Championships
Gold medal – first place	2014 Cali	Omnium
Silver medal – second place	2021 Roubaix	Team pursuit
European Championships
Gold medal – first place	2022 Munich	Team pursuit
Silver medal – second place	2013 Apeldoorn	Points race
Silver medal – second place	2022 Munich	Madison
Silver medal – second place	2024 Apeldoorn	Madison
Bronze medal – third place	2021 Grenchen	Elimination

Thomas Boudat (French: [tɔma buda]; born 24 February 1994) is a French former racing cyclist, who competed as a professional from 2015 to 2024. On the track, he won medals at the World and European Championships. He also took five professional wins in road races and competed in two editions of the Tour de France.

== Major results ==
=== Road ===
2011
4th Bernaudeau Junior
2012
7th Road race, UCI World Junior Championships
8th Bernaudeau Junior
2013
National University Championships

1st Road race
2nd Time trial

1st Circuit des vins du Blayais
1st Stage 3 Tour des Mauges
1st Stage 3 (TTT) Tour de Seine Maritime
7th Road race, Mediterranean Games
2014
1st ZLM Tour
2nd La Côte Picarde
4th Road race, UEC European Under-23 Championships
5th Overall Paris–Arras Tour
2015
1st Classica Corsica
9th Grand Prix Impanis-Van Petegem
2016
2nd Grand Prix de Denain
3rd Overall Boucles de la Mayenne

1st Young rider classification

8th La Roue Tourangelle
2017
1st Grand Prix de la Ville de Lillers
1st Paris–Chauny
1st Stage 3 Settimana Internazionale di Coppi e Bartali
2nd Paris–Troyes
2nd Classic Loire-Atlantique
5th Tour de Vendée
8th Route Adélie
2018
1st Cholet-Pays de la Loire
1st Stage 1 Vuelta a Andalucía
3rd Brussels Cycling Classic
7th Tour de Vendée
2019
1st Circuit de Wallonie
3rd Cholet-Pays de la Loire
4th La Roue Tourangelle
5th Grand Prix Pino Cerami
6th Clásica de Almería
6th Grand Prix of Aargau Canton
8th Route Adélie
9th Bredene Koksijde Classic
2020
5th Grote Prijs Jean-Pierre Monseré
10th Clásica de Almería
2021
2nd Grand Prix La Marseillaise
6th Grote Prijs Jean-Pierre Monseré
8th Cholet-Pays de la Loire
2022
4th La Roue Tourangelle
6th Cholet-Pays de la Loire

==== Grand Tour general classification results timeline ====
Grand Tour	2017	2018
Giro d'Italia	—	—
Tour de France	140	89
Vuelta a España	—	—

Legend
—	Did not compete
DNF	Did not finish

=== Track ===
2011
National Junior Championships

2nd Madison (with Yoän Vérardo)
3rd Team pursuit

3rd Team pursuit, UEC European Junior Championships
2012
1st Points race, UEC European Junior Championships
National Junior Championships

1st Individual pursuit
1st Madison (with Clément Barbeau)
1st Team pursuit
2nd Points race

2013
1st Madison (with Vivien Brisse), UCI World Cup, Aguascalientes
UEC European Under-23 Championships

1st Madison (with Bryan Coquard)
1st Points race
3rd Omnium

National Championships

1st Omnium
1st Points race
1st Team pursuit
2nd Scratch
3rd Individual pursuit

2nd Points race, UEC European Championships
2014
1st Omnium, UCI World Championships
National Championships

1st Omnium
1st Scratch
1st Team pursuit
2nd Individual pursuit
2nd Madison (with Lucas Destang)

1st Trois Jours de Grenoble (with Vivien Brisse)
UEC European Under-23 Championships

2nd Points race
3rd Madison (with Marc Fournier)

2015
National Championships

1st Madison (with Bryan Coquard)
1st Points race
1st Team pursuit

UEC European Under-23 Championships

2nd Madison (with Benjamin Thomas)
3rd Omnium

2016
1st Omnium, UCI World Cup, Hong Kong
1st Omnium, UEC European Under-23 Championships
National Championships

1st Points race
1st Scratch
3rd Madison (with Nicolas Boudat)

2017
National Championships

1st Madison (with Sylvain Chavanel)
1st Scratch
3rd Omnium
3rd Points race

2018
National Championships

1st Omnium
1st Scratch
2nd Madison (with Sylvain Chavanel)
3rd Team pursuit

2019
1st Six Days of Rotterdam (with Niki Terpstra)
2021
2nd Team pursuit, UCI World Championships
2023
UCI Nations Cup

3rd Madison, Milton (with Benjamin Thomas)
3rd Team pursuit, Milton

2024
2nd Madison, UEC European Championships (with Donavan Grondin)
