= Leonardo Tortomasi =

Italian cyclist

Personal information
- Born: 21 January 1994 (age 32) Partinico, Italy

Cycling career
- Sport: Cycling
- Current team: Retired
- Discipline: Road
- Role: Rider

Amateur teams
- 2013–2015: Maltinti Lampadari–Banca di Cambiano
- 2016: Altopack–Eppela–Coppi Lunata
- 2017: Figros Snep Focus
- 2018–2019: Polisportiva Tripetetolo

Professional team
- 2020–2021: Vini Zabù–KTM

Leonardo Tortomasi (born 21 January 1994) is an Italian former cyclist, who competed as a professional from 2021 to 2021 for UCI ProTeam Vini Zabù.

== Major results ==
2019
2nd Gran Premio San Giuseppe
