= 2019 Brussels Cycling Classic =

2019 UCI Europe Tour
- Event poster with previous winner Pascal Ackermann

Race details
- Dates: 7 September 2019
- Stages: 1
- Distance: 189 km (117.4 mi)
- Winning time: 4h 25' 35"

Results
	Winner	Caleb Ewan (AUS)	(Lotto–Soudal)
	Second	Pascal Ackermann (GER)	(Bora–Hansgrohe)
	Third	Jasper Philipsen (BEL)	(UAE Team Emirates)

The 2019 Brussels Cycling Classic was the 99th edition of the Brussels Cycling Classic road cycling one day race. It was held on 7 September 2019 as part of the 2019 UCI Europe Tour.

== Teams ==
Twenty-five teams participated in the race, of which nine were UCI WorldTour teams, fifteen were UCI Professional Continental teams, and one was a UCI Continental Team. Each team entered seven riders, with the exception of AG2R La Mondiale, who entered six. Of the 174 riders who started the race, only 155 riders finished.

UCI WorldTeams

- AG2R La Mondiale
- Astana
- Bora–Hansgrohe
- Deceuninck–Quick-Step
- Groupama–FDJ
- Lotto–Soudal
- Mitchelton–Scott
- Trek–Segafredo
- UAE Team Emirates

UCI Professional Continental Teams

- Arkéa–Samsic
- Cofidis
- Corendon–Circus
- Delko–Marseille Provence
- Gazprom–RusVelo
- Israel Cycling Academy
- Neri Sottoli–Selle Italia–KTM
- Nippo–Vini Fantini–Faizanè
- Roompot–Charles
- Sport Vlaanderen–Baloise
- Team Novo Nordisk
- Total Direct Énergie
- Vital Concept–B&B Hotels
- Wallonie Bruxelles
- Wanty–Gobert

UCI Continental Teams

- Development Team Sunweb

== Results ==
Result
Rank	Rider	Team	Time
1	Caleb Ewan (AUS)	Lotto–Soudal	4h 25' 35"
2	Pascal Ackermann (GER)	Bora–Hansgrohe	+ 0"
3	Jasper Philipsen (BEL)	UAE Team Emirates	+ 0"
4	Davide Ballerini (ITA)	Astana	+ 0"
5	Jasper Stuyven (BEL)	Trek–Segafredo	+ 0"
6	Arnaud Démare (FRA)	Groupama–FDJ	+ 0"
7	Alexander Kristoff (NOR)	UAE Team Emirates	+ 0"
8	Amaury Capiot (BEL)	Sport Vlaanderen–Baloise	+ 0"
9	Baptiste Planckaert (BEL)	Wallonie Bruxelles	+ 0"
10	Kaden Groves (AUS)	Mitchelton–Scott	+ 0"
