= 2019 Grand Prix de Fourmies =

2019 UCI Europe Tour

Race details
- Dates: 8 September 2019
- Stages: 1
- Distance: 205 km (127.4 mi)
- Winning time: 4h 46' 29"

Results
	Winner	Pascal Ackermann (GER)	(Bora–Hansgrohe)
	Second	Jasper Philipsen (BEL)	(UAE Team Emirates)
	Third	Boy van Poppel (NED)	(Roompot–Charles)

The 2019 Grand Prix de Fourmies was the 87th edition of the Grand Prix de Fourmies road cycling one day race. It was held on 8 September 2019 as part of the UCI Europe Tour as a 1.HC-ranked event.

== Teams ==
Twenty-four teams participated in the race, of which six are UCI WorldTour teams, fourteen are UCI Professional Continental teams, and four are UCI Continental teams. Each team entered seven riders, and of the 168 riders that started the race, only 143 riders finished.

UCI WorldTeams

- AG2R La Mondiale
- Astana
- Bora–Hansgrohe
- Groupama–FDJ
- Trek–Segafredo
- UAE Team Emirates

UCI Professional Continental Teams

- Arkéa–Samsic
- Cofidis
- Delko–Marseille Provence
- Gazprom–RusVelo
- Israel Cycling Academy
- Neri Sottoli–Selle Italia–KTM
- Nippo–Vini Fantini–Faizanè
- Roompot–Charles
- Sport Vlaanderen–Baloise
- Team Novo Nordisk
- Total Direct Énergie
- Vital Concept–B&B Hotels
- Wallonie Bruxelles
- Wanty–Gobert

UCI Continental Teams

- Amore & Vita–Prodir
- IAM–Excelsior
- Natura4Ever–Roubaix–Lille Métropole
- St. Michel–Auber93

== Result ==
Result
Rank	Rider	Team	Time
1	Pascal Ackermann (GER)	Bora–Hansgrohe	4h 46' 29"
2	Jasper Philipsen (BEL)	UAE Team Emirates	+ 0"
3	Boy van Poppel (NED)	Roompot–Charles	+ 0"
4	Edwin Ávila (COL)	Israel Cycling Academy	+ 0"
5	Pierre Barbier (FRA)	Natura4Ever–Roubaix–Lille Métropole	+ 0"
6	Jasper Stuyven (BEL)	Trek–Segafredo	+ 0"
7	Imerio Cima (ITA)	Nippo–Vini Fantini–Faizanè	+ 0"
8	Amaury Capiot (BEL)	Sport Vlaanderen–Baloise	+ 0"
9	Julien Duval (FRA)	AG2R La Mondiale	+ 0"
10	Hugo Hofstetter (FRA)	Cofidis	+ 0"
