= Lawrence Naesen =

Belgian road cyclist

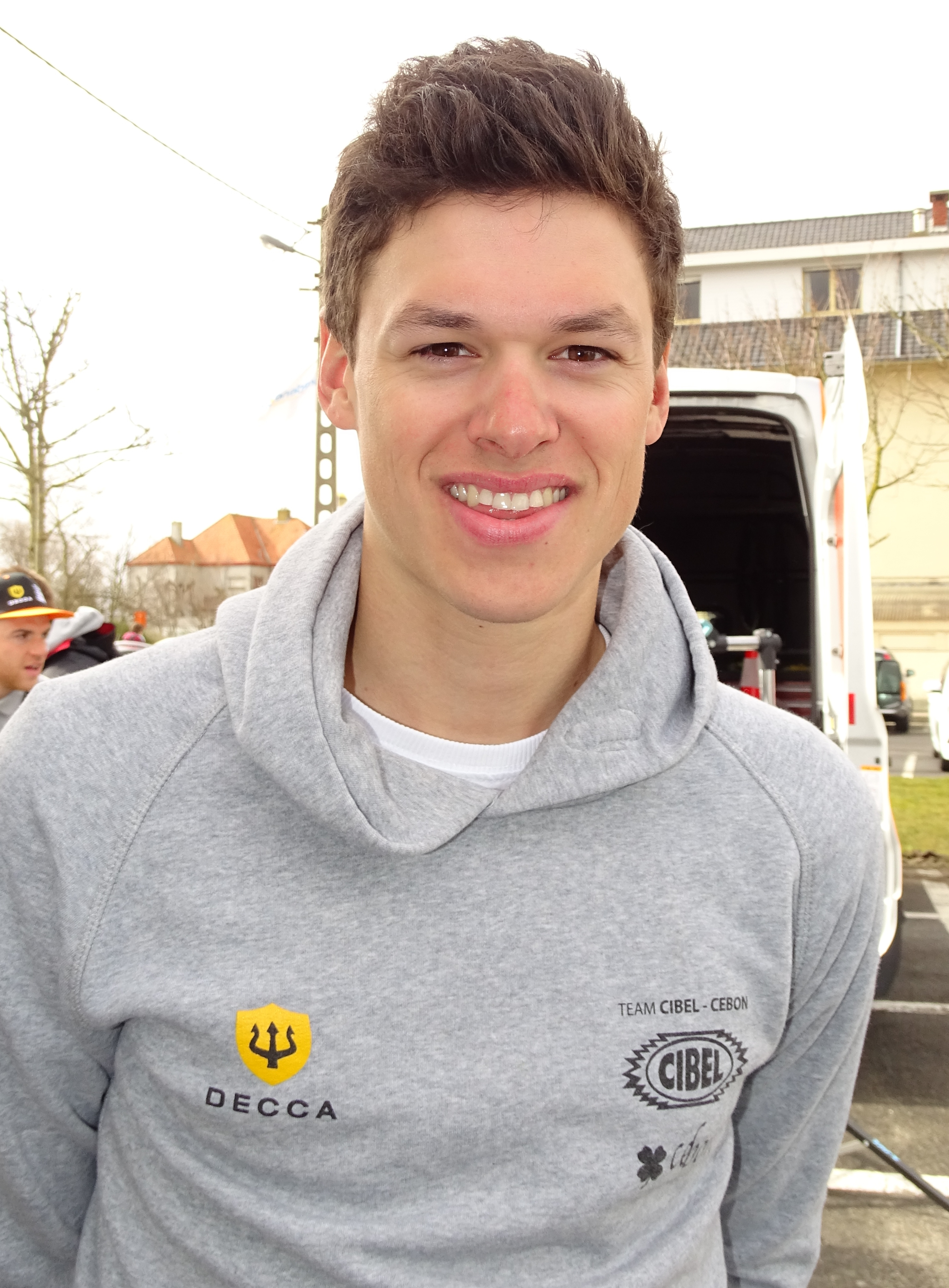
- Naesen in 2016.

Personal information
- Full name: Lawrence Naesen
- Born: 28 August 1992 (age 34) Ostend, Flanders, Belgium
- Height: 1.90 m (6 ft 3 in)
- Weight: 72 kg (159 lb)

Cycling career
- Sport: Cycling
- Discipline: Road
- Role: Rider

Professional teams
- 2015–2016: Cibel
- 2017: WB Veranclassic Aqua Protect
- 2018–2019: Lotto–Soudal
- 2020–2023: AG2R La Mondiale

Lawrence Naesen (born 28 August 1992 in Ostend) is a Belgian cyclist, who last rode for UCI WorldTeam AG2R Citroën Team. He is the brother of racing cyclist Oliver Naesen, who is also a member of the Decathlon CMA CGM Team team.

In September 2017 it was announced that Naesen would join Lotto–Soudal on a two-year contract from 2018. Upon the expiration of his contract, he joined AG2R La Mondiale.

== Major results ==
=== Gravel ===
2025
1st Stage 3 Ardenne Gravel Stages
Nordic Gravel Series

3rd Nastola

=== Road ===
2016
5th Memorial Philippe Van Coningsloo
6th Circuit de Wallonie
2017
3rd Bruges Cycling Classic
5th Heistse Pijl
5th Dwars door de Vlaamse Ardennen
2019
6th Kampioenschap van Vlaanderen
7th Bredene Koksijde Classic
8th Eschborn–Frankfurt
9th Omloop van het Houtland
10th Nokere Koerse
10th Famenne Ardenne Classic
2020
7th Brussels Cycling Classic
2021
8th Grand Prix d'Isbergues
8th Paris–Chauny
2022
10th Trofeo Alcúdia–Port d'Alcúdia

==== Grand Tour general classification results timeline ====
Grand Tour	2021	2022
Giro d'Italia	119	124
Tour de France	—	—
Vuelta a España	—	—

Legend
—	Did not compete
DNF	Did not finish
IP	Race in Progress
