= Luka Mezgec =

Slovenian cyclist (born 1988)

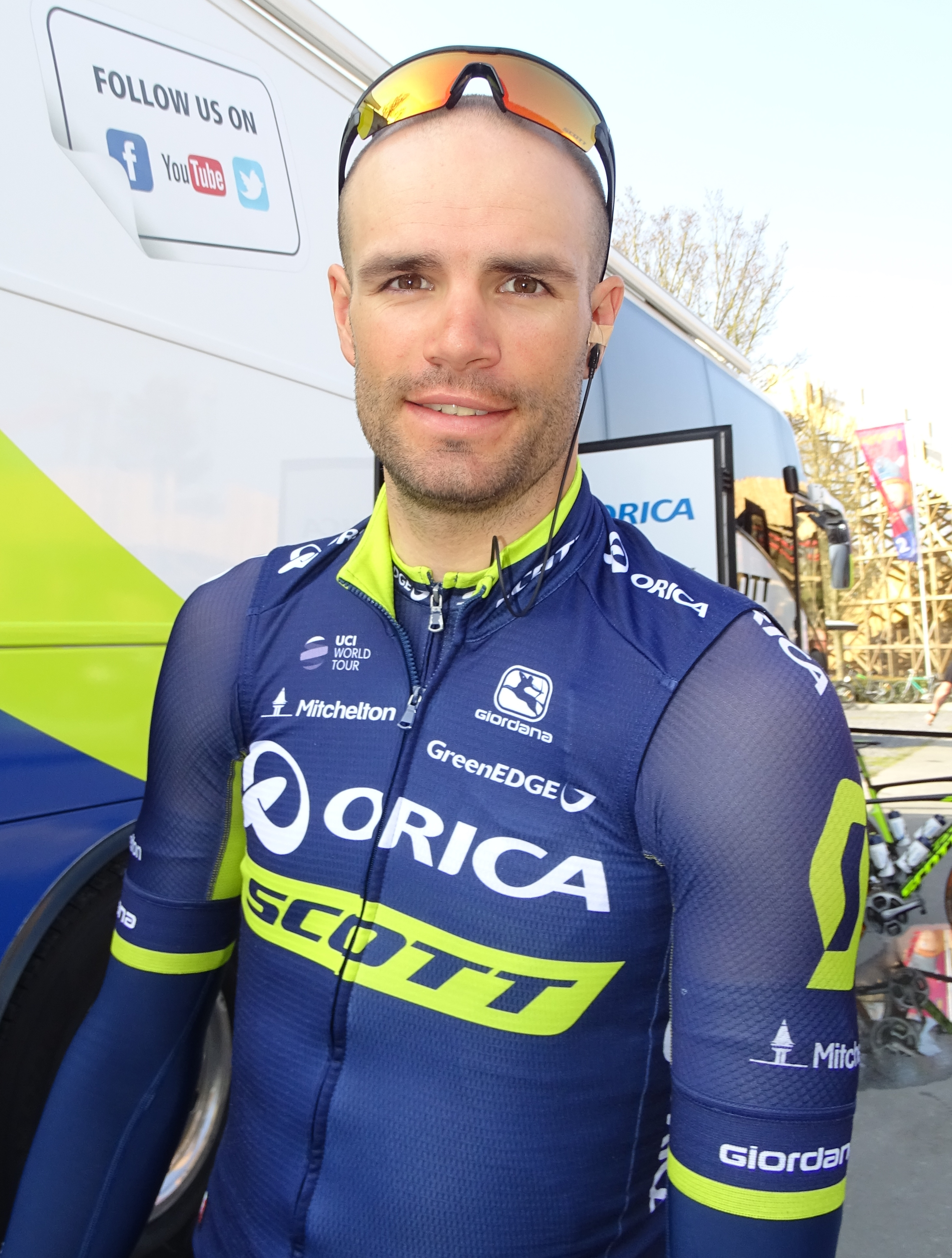
- Mezgec in 2017

Personal information
- Full name: Luka Mezgec
- Born: 27 June 1988 (age 38) Kranj, SFR Yugoslavia (now Slovenia)
- Height: 1.83 m (6 ft 0 in)
- Weight: 72 kg (159 lb)

Cycling career
- Sport: Cycling
- Current team: Team Jayco–AlUla
- Discipline: Road
- Role: Rider
- Rider type: Sprinter; Lead-out specialist

Professional teams
- 2010: Zheroquadro–Radenska
- 2011–2012: Sava
- 2013–2015: Argos–Shimano
- 2016–: Orica–GreenEDGE

Major wins
- Grand Tours Giro d'Italia 1 individual stage (2014) One-day races and Classics National Road Race Championships (2017)

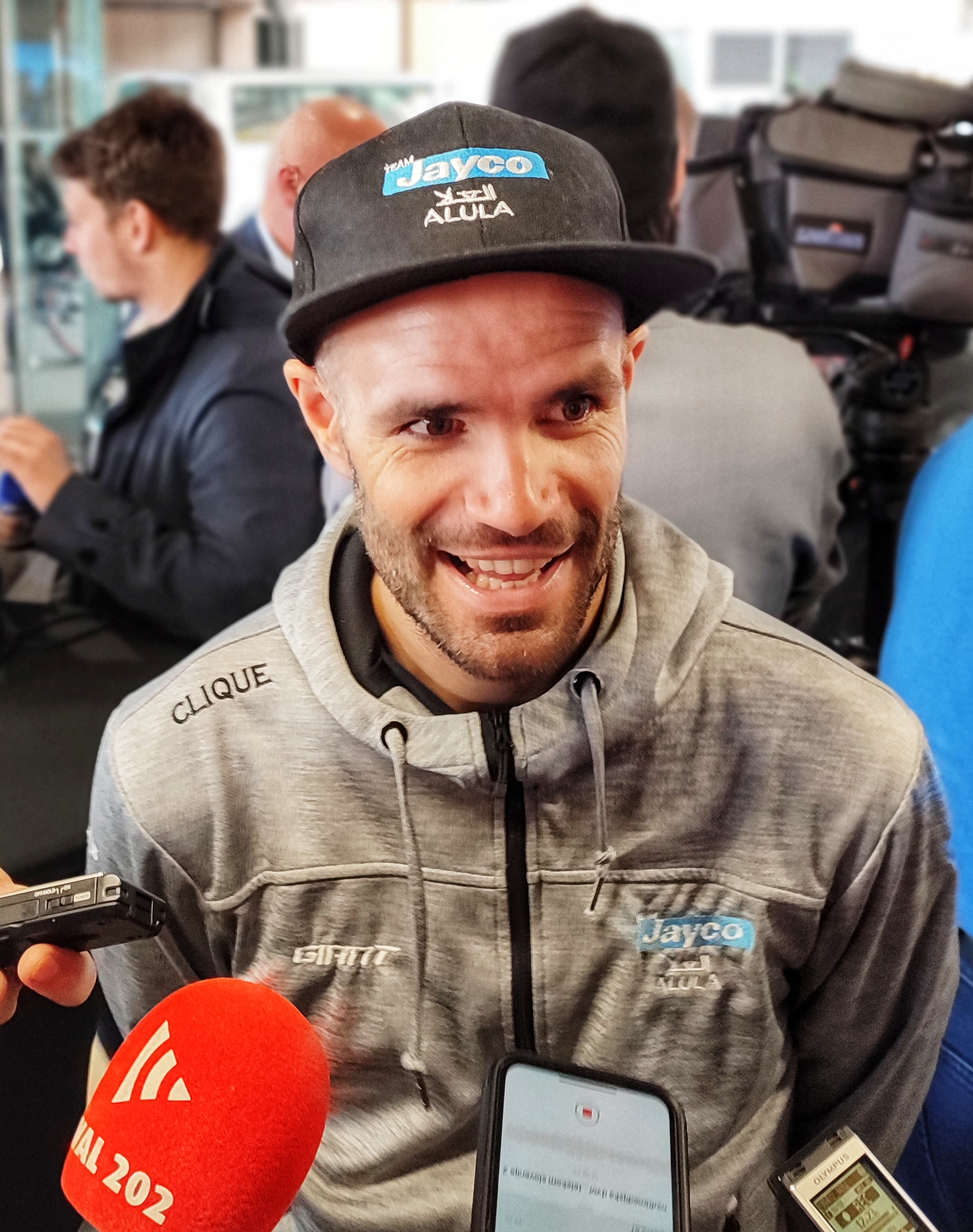
Mezgec at 2023 Tour of Slovenia press conference

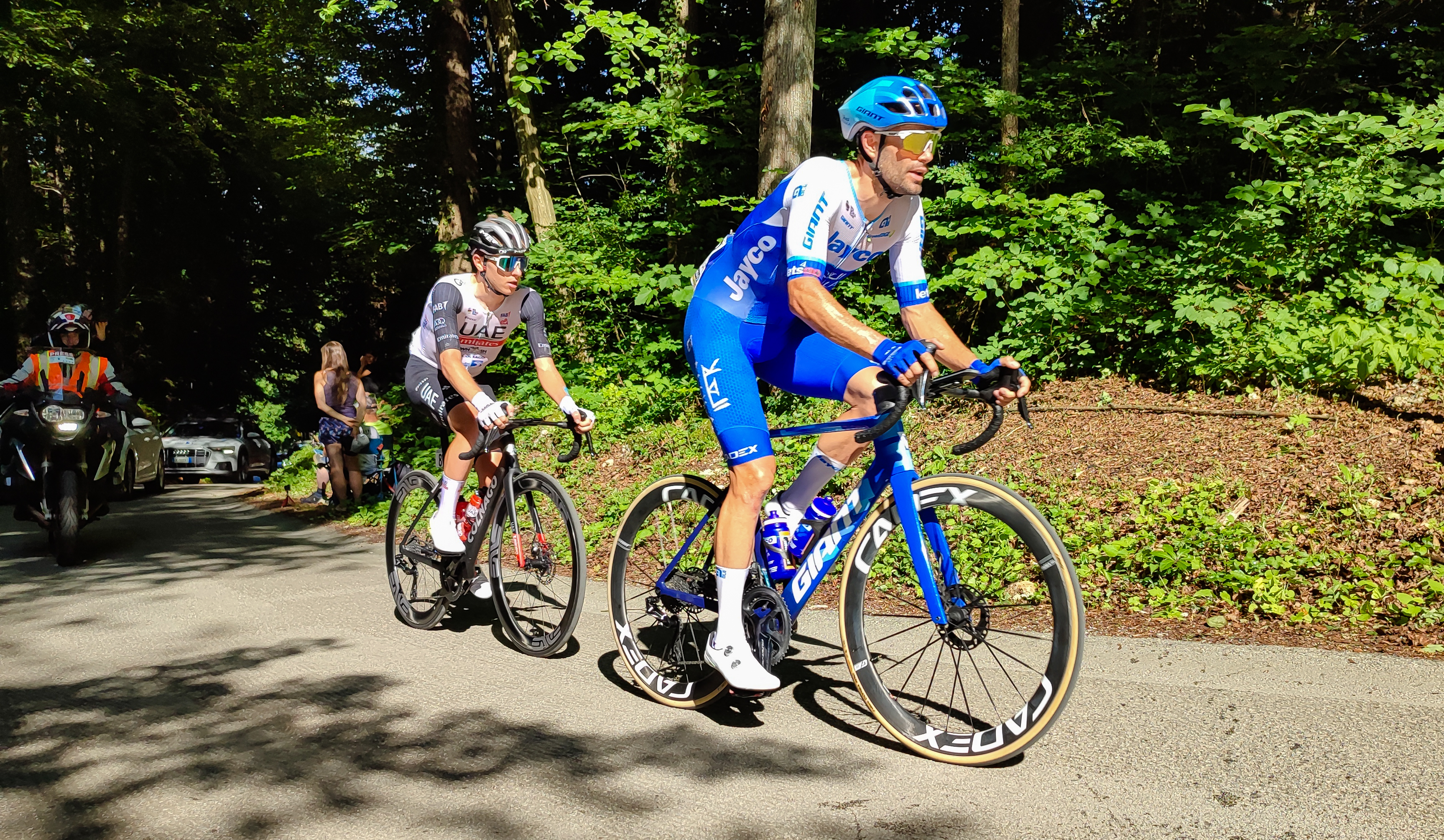
Mezgec (Team Jayco–AlUla) and Tadej Pogačar (UAE Team Emirates) on the 2023 Slovenian National Road Race Championship. Mezgec led Pogačar for most of the race till last two rounds helping to break from Matej Mohorič (Team Bahrain Victorious). Mezgec finished as second.

Luka Mezgec (born 27 June 1988) is a Slovenian road bicycle racer, who currently rides for UCI WorldTeam Team Jayco–AlUla. After scoring numerous podium finishes in 2013, Mezgec finally tasted victory on the fifth stage of the Tour of Beijing. He was named in the start list for the 2015 Vuelta a España.

In September 2015 it was announced that Mezgec had signed an initial two-year contract with Orica–GreenEDGE to commence in 2016. In August 2020, he was named in the startlist for the 2020 Tour de France.

== Major results ==
2009
1st Vzpon na Mohor
2010
1st Overall Coupe des nations Ville Saguenay
5th Overall Course de la Solidarité Olympique
2011
1st Memoriał Henryka Łasaka
1st Stage 1 Istrian Spring Trophy
2nd GP Kranj
2nd VN HiFi-Color Studio
3rd Banja Luka–Beograd II
3rd Central European Tour Budapest GP
6th Ljubljana–Zagreb
8th Overall Rhône-Alpes Isère Tour
8th Banja Luka–Beograd I
10th Central European Tour Miskolc GP
2012 (5 pro wins)
2nd Memorijal Nevio Valčić
2nd Banja Luka–Beograd I
2nd Memoriał Henryka Łasaka
3rd Poreč Trophy
3rd Central European Tour Budapest GP
3rd Ljubljana–Zagreb
3rd Trofeo Gianfranco Bianchin
4th Banja Luka–Beograd II
4th Grand Prix of Moscow
5th Road race, National Road Championships
5th Overall Five Rings of Moscow

1st Points classification
1st Stage 5

5th Grand Prix Südkärnten
5th Central European Tour Miskolc GP
5th Coupe des Carpathes
6th Overall Tour of Qinghai Lake

1st Points classification
1st Stages 2, 4, 6, 11 & 13

2013 (1)
1st Stage 5 Tour of Beijing
2nd Halle–Ingooigem
7th Handzame Classic
2014 (6)
1st Handzame Classic
Volta a Catalunya

1st Stages 1, 2 & 5

1st Stage 21 Giro d'Italia
1st Stage 1 Tour of Beijing
2nd Road race, National Road Championships
2nd Kampioenschap van Vlaanderen
2015 (1)
1st Stage 2 Tour du Haut Var
2016
2nd Road race, National Road Championships
9th Paris–Tours
2017 (3)
1st Road race, National Road Championships
1st National MTB XC Championships
1st National CX Championships
1st Arnhem–Veenendaal Classic
1st Stage 2 Tour of Slovenia
5th Road race, UEC European Road Championships
2019 (3)
Tour of Slovenia

1st Points classification
1st Stage 2

Tour de Pologne

1st Stages 2 & 5

3rd Clásica de Almería
8th Road race, UEC European Road Championships
8th Three Days of Bruges–De Panne
2020
1st Sprints classification, Tour de Pologne
2nd Bretagne Classic
5th Clásica de Almería
2021
3rd Road race, National Road Championships
2022
3rd Road race, National Road Championships
6th Road race, UEC European Road Championships
2023
2nd Road race, National Road Championships
4th Visit Friesland Elfsteden Race
8th Super 8 Classic

=== Grand Tour general classification results timeline ===
Grand Tour	2013	2014	2015	2016	2017	2018	2019	2020	2021	2022	2023	2024	2025
Giro d'Italia	123	136	138	DNF	107	—	—	—	—	—	—	DNF	—
Tour de France	—	—	—	—	—	—	—	88	102	101	112	116	
Vuelta a España	—	—	108	—	—	141	DNF	—	109	—	—	—	

Legend
—	Did not compete
DNF	Did not finish
