= 2019 Clásica de Almería =

2019 UCI Europe Tour

Race details
- Dates: 17 February 2019
- Stages: 1
- Distance: 192.5 km (119.6 mi)
- Winning time: 4h 27' 58"

Results
| | Winner | Pascal Ackermann (GER) |
| | Second | Marcel Kittel (GER) |
| | Third | Luka Mezgec (SLO) |

The 2019 Clásica de Almería was the 34th edition of the Clásica de Almería road cycling one day race. It was held on 17 February 2019 as part of the UCI Europe Tour in category 1.HC.

== Teams ==
Seventeen teams of up to seven riders started the race:

UCI WorldTeams

- Mitchelton–Scott
- CCC Team
- Movistar Team
- Bora–Hansgrohe
- Team Katusha–Alpecin
- Astana

UCI Professional Continental teams

- Sport Vlaanderen–Baloise
- Gazprom–RusVelo
- Euskadi–Murias
- Caja Rural–Seguros RGA
- Burgos BH
- Rally UHC Cycling
- Wanty–Gobert
- Cofidis
- Roompot–Charles
- Vital Concept–B&B Hotels
- Direct Énergie

== Result ==
Final general classification

| Rank | Rider | Team | Time |
|---|---|---|---|
| 1 | Pascal Ackermann (GER) | Bora–Hansgrohe | 4h 27' 58" |
| 2 | Marcel Kittel (GER) | Team Katusha–Alpecin | s.t. |
| 3 | Luka Mezgec (SLO) | Mitchelton–Scott | s.t. |
| 4 | Carlos Barbero (ESP) | Movistar Team | s.t. |
| 5 | José Joaquín Rojas (ESP) | Movistar Team | s.t. |
| 6 | Thomas Boudat (FRA) | Direct Énergie | s.t. |
| 7 | Edward Planckaert (BEL) | Sport Vlaanderen–Baloise | s.t. |
| 8 | Lars Boom (NED) | Roompot–Charles | s.t. |
| 9 | Sjoerd van Ginneken (NED) | Roompot–Charles | s.t. |
| 10 | Pieter Vanspeybrouck (BEL) | Wanty–Gobert | s.t. |
