= Omloop Eurometropool =

Race details
- Date: September
- Region: West Flanders, Belgium
- Discipline: Road
- Competition: UCI Europe Tour
- Type: One-day race

History
- First edition: 2017
- Editions: 1
- Final edition: 2017
- First winner: André Greipel (GER)
- Most wins: No repeat winners
- Final winner: André Greipel (GER)

The Omloop Eurometropool, also known as Omloop van de Westhoek, was a one-day professional cycling race held in Belgium in 2017. It was part of UCI Europe Tour in category 1.1.

== Winners ==
Year	Country	Rider	Team
2017	Germany	André Greipel	Lotto–Soudal
