= Pascal Ackermann =

German bicycle racer (born 1994)

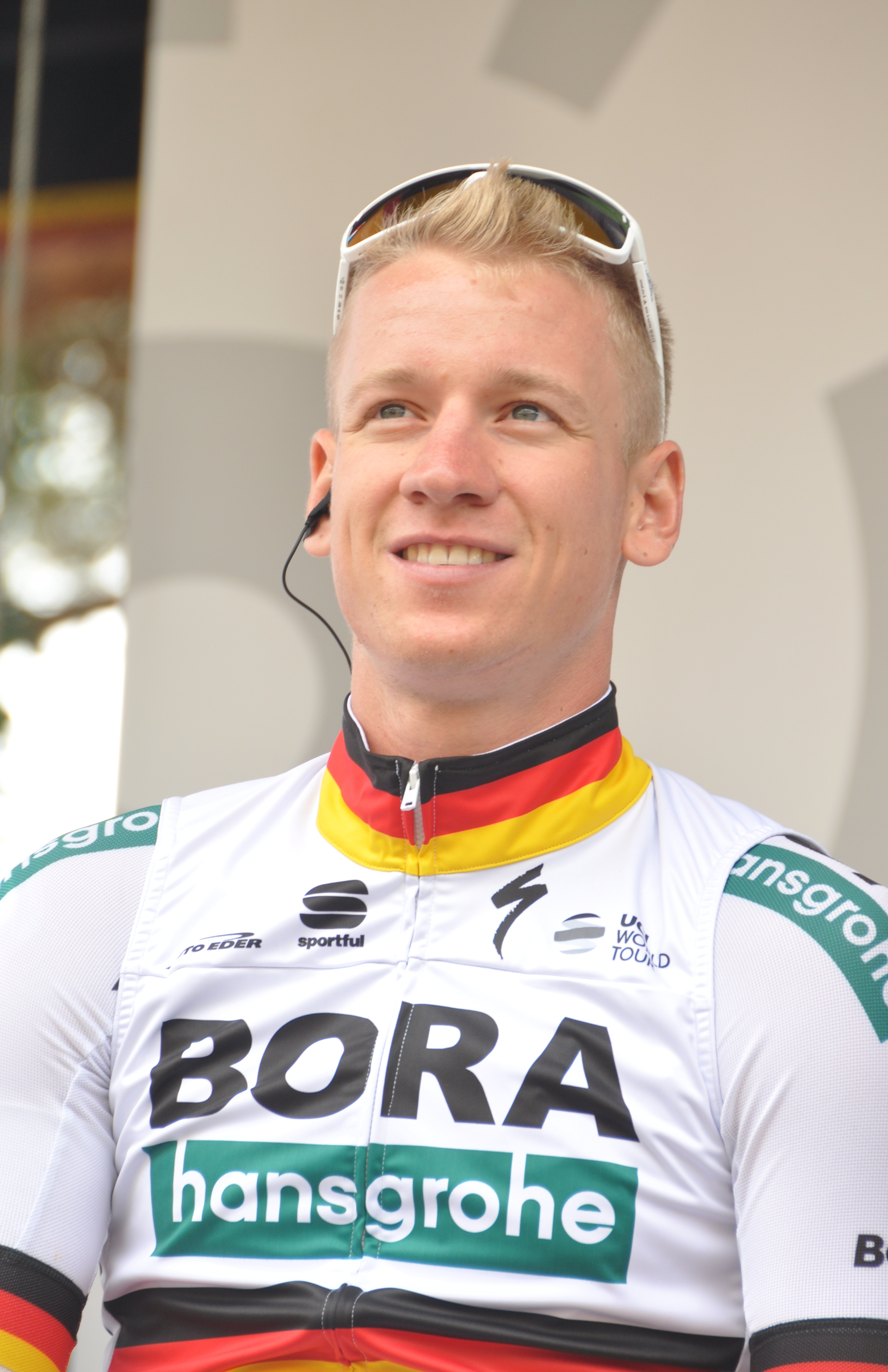
- Ackermann at the 2018 Deutschland Tour

Personal information
- Born: 17 January 1994 (age 32) Kandel, Germany
- Height: 1.80 m (5 ft 11 in)
- Weight: 78 kg (172 lb; 12 st 4 lb)

Cycling career
- Sport: Cycling
- Current team: NSN Cycling Team
- Disciplines: Road; Track
- Role: Rider
- Rider type: Sprinter

Amateur teams
- 2004–2012: RV Edelweiß Kandel
- 2011: Carboo4U Radsport Team Rheinland-Pfalz/Saarland
- 2012: Team CompressionX–Radshop Weigenand Rheinland-Pfalz/Saarland

Professional teams
- 2013–2016: Rad-Net Rose Team
- 2017–2021: Bora–Hansgrohe
- 2022–2023: UAE Team Emirates
- 2024–2025: Israel–Premier Tech

Major wins
- Grand Tours Giro d'Italia Points classification (2019) 3 individual stages (2019, 2023) Vuelta a España 2 individual stages (2020) One-day races and Classics National Road Race Championships (2018) Eschborn–Frankfurt (2019) London–Surrey Classic (2018) Brussels Cycling Classic (2018) GP de Fourmies (2018, 2019) Clásica de Almería (2019, 2020) Bredene Koksijde Classic (2019, 2022) Classique Dunkerque (2025)
Medal record
Representing Germany
Men's track cycling
European Championships (junior)
Gold medal – first place	2012 Anadia	Omnium
Silver medal – second place	2011 Anadia	Team sprint
Bronze medal – third place	2012 Anadia	Madison
Men's road bicycle racing
World Championships
Silver medal – second place	2016 Doha	Under-23 road race
European Championships
Bronze medal – third place	2020 Plouay	Elite road race
Bronze medal – third place	2019 Alkmaar	Elite road race

Pascal Ackermann (born 17 January 1994) is a German cyclist, who currently rides for UCI WorldTour Team Jayco–AlUla.

== Career ==
Born in Kandel, Ackermann joined the Rad-Net Rose Team team in 2013, and spent four seasons with the team. In August 2016 Bora–Hansgrohe announced that Ackermann would join them for the 2017 season. In 2018, he took 9 wins, including the London–Surrey Classic and the German national championships. His first pro win was stage five of the Tour de Romandie in April.

In May 2019, he competed in the Giro d'Italia, where he won the second and fifth stages, and became the first German rider to win the points classification in the Giro d'Italia. He also won Eschborn–Frankfurt only 11 days before the start of the Giro. In total, he took 13 victories that year.

In October 2020, he entered in the Vuelta a España, where he won the ninth and eighteenth stages.

After five seasons with Bora–Hansgrohe, Ackermann signed a two-year contract with UAE Team Emirates from the 2022 season. He won his third stage of the Giro d'Italia in 2023 on stage 11.

The following season, he joined Israel–Premier Tech on a two-year contract. In September 2025, Ackermann announced that he would not extend his expiring contract with Israel-Premier Tech and would join another team for the 2026 season.

== Major results ==
=== Road ===
2011
1st Stage 3 Int. 3-Etappenfahrt der Rad-Junioren
2012
Niedersachsen-Rundfahrt

1st Points classification
1st Stage 3

2015
1st Stage 2 Szlakiem Grodów Piastowskich
2nd Neuseen Classics
8th Road race, UEC European Under-23 Championships
8th Münsterland Giro
2016
1st Road race, National Under-23 Championships
Tour de Berlin

1st Stages 3b & 4

2nd Road race, UCI World Under-23 Championships
3rd Münsterland Giro
4th Road race, National Championships
4th Overall Tour of Estonia

1st Young rider classification

6th Kattekoers
7th Rund um Köln
2017
1st Sprints classification, Tour of the Alps
4th Road race, UEC European Championships
5th Scheldeprijs
2018 (9 pro wins)
1st Road race, National Championships
1st London–Surrey Classic
1st Brussels Cycling Classic
1st Grand Prix de Fourmies
Tour de Pologne

1st Stages 1 & 2

1st Stage 2 Critérium du Dauphiné
1st Stage 5 Tour de Romandie
1st Stage 2 Tour of Guangxi
2nd Three Days of Bruges–De Panne
2nd Scheldeprijs
3rd Handzame Classic
5th Münsterland Giro
2019 (13)
1st Eschborn–Frankfurt
1st Clásica de Almería
1st Bredene Koksijde Classic
1st Grand Prix de Fourmies
1st Gooikse Pijl
Giro d'Italia

1st Points classification
1st Stages 2 & 5

Tour of Guangxi

1st Points classification
1st Stages 3 & 6

Tour de Pologne

1st Stages 1 & 3

1st Stage 1 Deutschland Tour
1st Stage 1 Tour of Slovenia
1st Points classification, Volta ao Algarve
2nd Brussels Cycling Classic
2nd Münsterland Giro
2nd Nokere Koerse
2nd Primus Classic
3rd Road race, UEC European Championships
2020 (8)
1st Clásica de Almería
Vuelta a España

1st Stages 9 & 18

Tirreno–Adriatico

1st Points classification
1st Stage 1 & 2

Sibiu Cycling Tour

1st Stages 2 & 3b

1st Stage 1 UAE Tour
2nd Road race, National Championships
2nd Trofeo Campos, Porreres, Felanitx, Ses Salines
2nd Trofeo de Playa de Palma–Palma
3rd Road race, UEC European Championships
6th Brussels Cycling Classic
2021 (6)
Settimana Ciclistica Italiana

1st Points classification
1st Stages 2, 3 & 5

Sibiu Cycling Tour

1st Points classification
1st Prologue & Stage 3

2nd Overall Deutschland Tour

1st Points classification
1st Stage 1

2nd Grand Prix de Fourmies
3rd Classic Brugge–De Panne
4th Elfstedenronde
5th Eschborn–Frankfurt
5th Grand Prix of Aargau Canton
6th Scheldeprijs
9th Münsterland Giro
2022 (2)
1st Bredene Koksijde Classic
1st Stage 4 Tour de Pologne
8th Trofeo Alcúdia–Port d'Alcúdia
9th Nokere Koerse
2023 (2)
1st Stage 11 Giro d'Italia
1st Stage 1 Tour of Austria
2nd Bredene Koksijde Classic
2024
4th Brussels Cycling Classic
4th Nokere Koerse
5th Rund um Köln
7th Münsterland Giro
2025 (1)
1st Classique Dunkerque
2026
2nd Bredene Koksijde Classic
8th Clásica de Almería

==== Grand Tour general classification results timeline ====
Grand Tour	2019	2020	2021	2022	2023	2024	2025	2026
Giro d'Italia	122	—	—	—	82	—	—	DNF
Tour de France	—	—	—	—	—	112	125	
Vuelta a España	—	131	—	111	—	—	—	

=== Track ===
2011
1st Team sprint, UCI World Junior Championships
National Junior Championships

1st Kilo
1st Team sprint
2nd Keirin

2nd Team sprint, UEC European Junior Championships
2012
UEC European Junior Championships

1st Omnium
3rd Madison (with Domenic Weinstein)

National Junior Championships

1st Points race
2nd Team sprint
2nd Madison (with Domenic Weinstein)

2nd Scratch, National Championships
2013
National Championships

2nd Scratch
2nd Team sprint

2014
3rd Madison, National Championships (with Marco Mathis)
