= Grand Prix de Fourmies =

Bicycle race held in the Fourmies commune of France

Coordinates: 50.018°N 4.054°E

Race details
- Date: Mid September
- Region: Nord, France
- English name: Grand Prize of Fourmies
- Local name: Grand Prix de Fourmies (in French)
- Discipline: Road
- Competition: UCI ProSeries
- Type: One-day race
- Organiser: La Voix du Nord
- Web site: www.grandprixdefourmies.com

History
- First edition: 1928
- Editions: 93 (as of 2026)
- First winner: Albert Barthelemy (FRA)
- Most wins: Albert Barthelemy (FRA); Jean-Luc Vandenbroucke (BEL) (3 wins)
- Most recent: Arvid de Kleijn (NED)

The Grand Prix de Fourmies is a bicycle race held in the Fourmies commune of France. From 2005 to 2019 it was organised as a 1.HC event on the UCI Europe Tour. In 2021, it joined the UCI ProSeries, after being cancelled in 2020.

== List of winners ==
Year	Country	Rider	Team
1928	France	Albert Barthélémy	
1929	France	Albert Barthélémy	
1930	France	Albert Barthélémy	
1931	France	André Vanderdonckt	
1932	Belgium	Georges Christiaens	
1933	France	François Mintkiewicz	
1934	France	Maurice Leleux	
1935	Belgium	Éloi Meulenberg	
1936	Belgium	Léon Lebon	
1937	France	Gabriel Dubois	
1938	France	Gabriel Dubois	
1939	France	Emile Laplanche	
1940	No race		
1941	France	Maurice De Muer	
1942	No race		
1943	France	Camille Blanckaert	
1944– 1945	No race		
1946	France	René Lafosse	
1947	France	Fernard Patte	
1948	France	Georges Hubatz	
1949	France	Eugène Dupuis	
1950	Poland	Edouard Klabinski	
1951	France	Francis Delepierre	
1952	Belgium	Michel Vuylsteke	
1953	France	Gilbert Pertry	Peugeot–Dunlop
1954	France	Serge Meneghetti	Dilecta–Wolber
1955	France	Pierre Pardoën	Bertin–D'Alessandro
1956	Italy	Elio Gerussi	individual
1957	France	Jean Stablinski	Essor–Leroux
1958	Belgium	Pierre Machiels	Saint-Raphaël–Geminiani
1959	Belgium	André Noyelle	Bertin–Milremo
1960	France	Michel Vermeulin	Helyett–Leroux
1961	France	Joseph Wasko	Mercier–BP–Hutchinson
1962	France	Guy Ignolin	Gitane–Leroux
1963	Belgium	Benoni Beheyt	Wiel's–Groene Leeuw
1964	Belgium	Frans Melckenbeeck	
1965	Belgium	Georges Van Coningsloo	
1967	Belgium	Willy Van Neste	
1968	Netherlands	Gerben Karstens	
1969	Belgium	Ronald De Witte	
1970	Belgium	Noël Van Tychem	
1971	Great Britain	Barry Hoban	
1972	Netherlands	René Pijnen	
1973	Belgium	Eddy Merckx	
1974	Belgium	Willy Teirlinck	
1975	West Germany	Dietrich Thurau	
1976	Belgium	Jean-Luc Vandenbroucke	
1977	Belgium	Jean-Luc Vandenbroucke	
1978	France	Yves Hézard	
1979	Belgium	Jean-Luc Vandenbroucke	
1980	France	Jacques Bossis	
1981	Belgium	Jozef Lieckens	
1982	Belgium	Rudy Mathys	
1983	France	Gilbert Duclos-Lassalle	
1984	Belgium	Ferdi Van Den Haute	
1985	Netherlands	Jean Habets	
1986	Belgium	Jozef Lieckens	
1987	Netherlands	Adri van der Poel	
1988	Belgium	Edwin Bafcop	
1989	France	Martial Gayant	
1990	Netherlands	Frans Maassen	
1991	France	Vincent Lacressonnière	Tonton Tapis–GB–Corona
1992	Germany	Olaf Ludwig	Panasonic–Sportlife
1993	Italy	Maximilian Sciandri	Motorola
1994	Italy	Andrea Tafi	Mapei–CLAS
1995	Great Britain	Maximilian Sciandri	MG Maglificio–Technogym
1996	Italy	Michele Bartoli	MG Maglificio–Technogym
1997	Italy	Andrea Tafi	Mapei–GB
1998	Italy	Luca Mazzanti	Cantina Tollo–Alexia Alluminio
1999	Russia	Dimitri Konyshev	Mercatone Uno–Bianchi
2000	Slovenia	Andrej Hauptman	Vini Caldirola–Sidermec
2001	Australia	Scott Sunderland	Team Fakta
2002	Italy	Gianluca Bortolami	Tacconi Sport
2003	Australia	Baden Cooke	FDJeux.com
2004	Kazakhstan	Andrei Kashechkin	Crédit Agricole
2005	Australia	Robbie McEwen	Davitamon–Lotto
2006	Belgium	Philippe Gilbert	Française des Jeux
2007	Slovakia	Peter Velits	Wiesenhof–Felt
2008	Italy	Giovanni Visconti	Quick-Step
2009	France	Romain Feillu	Agritubel
2010	France	Romain Feillu	Vacansoleil
2011	France	Guillaume Blot	Bretagne–Schuller
2012	Denmark	Lars Bak	Lotto–Belisol
2013	France	Nacer Bouhanni	FDJ.fr
2014	Belgium	Jonas Vangenechten	Lotto–Belisol
2015	Italy	Fabio Felline	Trek Factory Racing
2016	Germany	Marcel Kittel	Etixx–Quick-Step
2017	France	Nacer Bouhanni	Cofidis
2018	Germany	Pascal Ackermann	Bora–Hansgrohe
2019	Germany	Pascal Ackermann	Bora–Hansgrohe
2020	No race due to the COVID-19 pandemic		
2021	Italy	Elia Viviani	Cofidis
2022	Australia	Caleb Ewan	Lotto–Soudal
2023	Belgium	Tim Merlier	Soudal–Quick-Step
2024	Netherlands	Arvid de Kleijn	Tudor Pro Cycling Team
2025	France	Paul Magnier	Soudal–Quick-Step
2026	Netherlands	Arvid de Kleijn	Tudor Pro Cycling Team
