= 2019 Eschborn–Frankfurt =

Cycling race

2019 UCI World Tour, race 22 of 38

Race details
- Dates: 1 May 2019
- Stages: 1
- Distance: 187.5 km (116.5 mi)
- Winning time: 4h 23' 36"

Results
	Winner	Pascal Ackermann (GER)	(Bora–Hansgrohe)
	Second	John Degenkolb (GER)	(Trek–Segafredo)
	Third	Alexander Kristoff (NOR)	(UAE Team Emirates)

The 2019 Eschborn–Frankfurt was a road cycling one-day race that took place on 1 May 2019 in Germany. It was the 57th edition of Eschborn–Frankfurt and the 22nd event of the 2019 UCI World Tour. It was won in the sprint by Pascal Ackermann.

== Teams ==
In total, twenty-two teams start the race. Each team delivered seven riders.

UCI WorldTeams

- AG2R La Mondiale
- Astana
- Bahrain–Merida
- Bora–Hansgrohe
- CCC Team
- EF Education First
- Team Katusha–Alpecin
- Lotto–Soudal
- Team Dimension Data
- Team Sunweb
- Trek–Segafredo
- UAE Team Emirates

UCI Professional Continental teams

- Arkéa–Samsic
- Cofidis
- Gazprom–RusVelo
- Israel Cycling Academy
- Neri Sottoli–Selle Italia–KTM
- Roompot–Charles
- Sport Vlaanderen–Baloise
- Wallonie Bruxelles
- Wanty–Gobert
- Total Direct Énergie

== Result ==
Result
Rank	Rider	Team	Time
1	Pascal Ackermann (GER)	Bora–Hansgrohe	4h 23' 36"
2	John Degenkolb (GER)	Trek–Segafredo	+ 0"
3	Alexander Kristoff (NOR)	UAE Team Emirates	+ 0"
4	Davide Cimolai (ITA)	Israel Cycling Academy	+ 0"
5	Hugo Hofstetter (FRA)	Cofidis	+ 0"
6	Baptiste Planckaert (BEL)	Wallonie Bruxelles	+ 0"
7	Davide Gabburo (ITA)	Neri Sottoli–Selle Italia–KTM	+ 0"
8	Lawrence Naesen (BEL)	Lotto–Soudal	+ 0"
9	Marco Haller (AUT)	Team Katusha–Alpecin	+ 0"
10	Matej Mohorič (SLO)	Bahrain–Merida	+ 0"
