= Bredene Koksijde Classic =

Belgian one-day road cycling race

The Bredene Koksijde Classic

Race details
- Date: Late March
- Region: Flanders, Belgium
- English name: The Bredene Koksijde Classic
- Local name: The Bredene Koksijde Classic (in Dutch)
- Discipline: Road
- Competition: UCI ProSeries
- Type: Part of the Driedaagse van West-Vlaanderen (2002–2010); One-day race (since 2011)
- Web site: bredenekoksijdeclassic.be

History
- First edition: 2002
- Editions: 23 (as of 2026)
- First winner: Johan Museeuw (BEL)
- Most wins: Pascal Ackermann (GER) (2 wins)
- Most recent: Dylan Groenewegen (NED)

The Bredene Koksijde Classic, previously Handzame Classic, is a European single day cycle race held in the Belgian region of Flanders, starting in Bredene and finishing in Koksijde.

== History ==
Having been a part of the Driedaagse van West-Vlaanderen from 2002 to 2010, race organisers decided to run the race as a single-day race from 2011 and organized as a 1.1 event on the UCI Europe Tour, raised to 1.HC status from 2018. The race was previously known as Handzame Classic, but was renamed following a decision from the organisers to move the finish from Handzame to Koksijde. The first edition under the new name was held in 2019.

== Winners ==
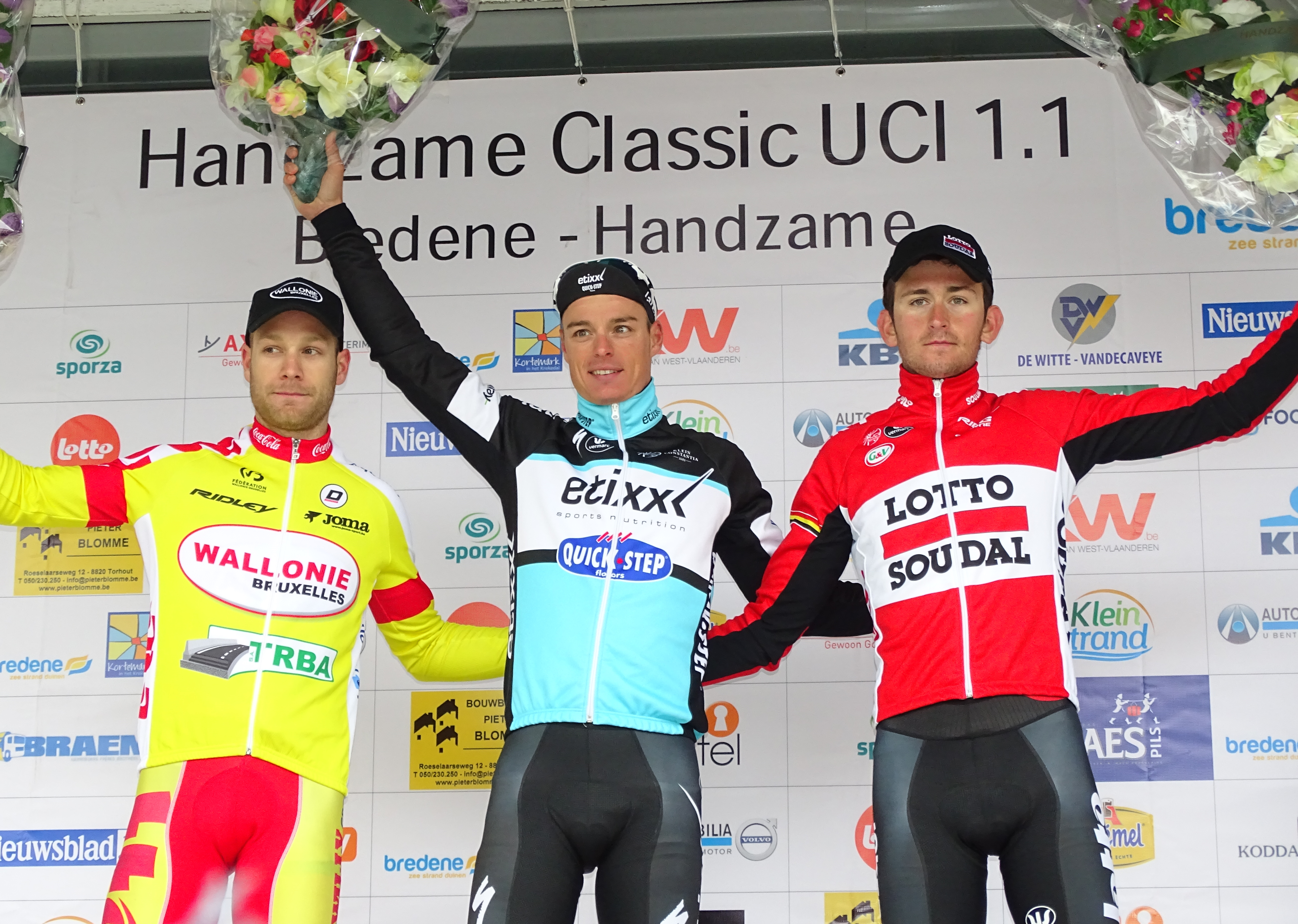
2015 Handzame Classic: Antoine Demoitié (2), Gianni Meersman (1) & Tiesj Benoot (3).

Year	Country	Rider	Team
2002	Belgium	Johan Museeuw	Domo–Farm Frites
2003	France	Jimmy Casper	FDJeux.com
2004	Estonia	Jaan Kirsipuu	AG2R Prévoyance
2005	No race		
2006	Australia	Robbie McEwen	Davitamon–Lotto
2007	Netherlands	Hans Dekkers	Agritubel
2008	Belarus	Yauheni Hutarovich	Française des Jeux
2009	Italy	Danilo Napolitano	Team Katusha
2010	Germany	Robert Wagner	Skil–Shimano
2011	Belgium	Steve Schets	Donckers Koffie-Jelly Belly
2012	Italy	Francesco Chicchi	Omega Pharma–Quick-Step
2013	Belgium	Kenny Dehaes	Lotto–Belisol
2014	Slovenia	Luka Mezgec	Giant–Shimano
2015	Belgium	Gianni Meersman	Etixx–Quick-Step
2016	Slovakia	Erik Baška	Tinkoff
2017	Norway	Kristoffer Halvorsen	Joker Icopal
2018	Colombia	Álvaro José Hodeg	Quick-Step Floors
2019	Germany	Pascal Ackermann	Bora–Hansgrohe
2020	No race due to COVID-19 pandemic		
2021	Belgium	Tim Merlier	Alpecin–Fenix
2022	Germany	Pascal Ackermann	UAE Team Emirates
2023	Belgium	Gerben Thijssen	Intermarché–Circus–Wanty
2024	Italy	Luca Mozzato	Arkéa–B&B Hotels
2025	Belgium	Edward Theuns	Lidl–Trek
2026	Netherlands	Dylan Groenewegen	Unibet Rose Rockets

=== Wins per country ===
Wins	Country
7	Belgium
3	Germany; Italy
2	Netherlands
1	Australia; Belarus; Colombia; Estonia; France; Norway; Slovakia; Slovenia
