= 2020 Team Jumbo–Visma season =

Team Jumbo–Visma
- 2020 season
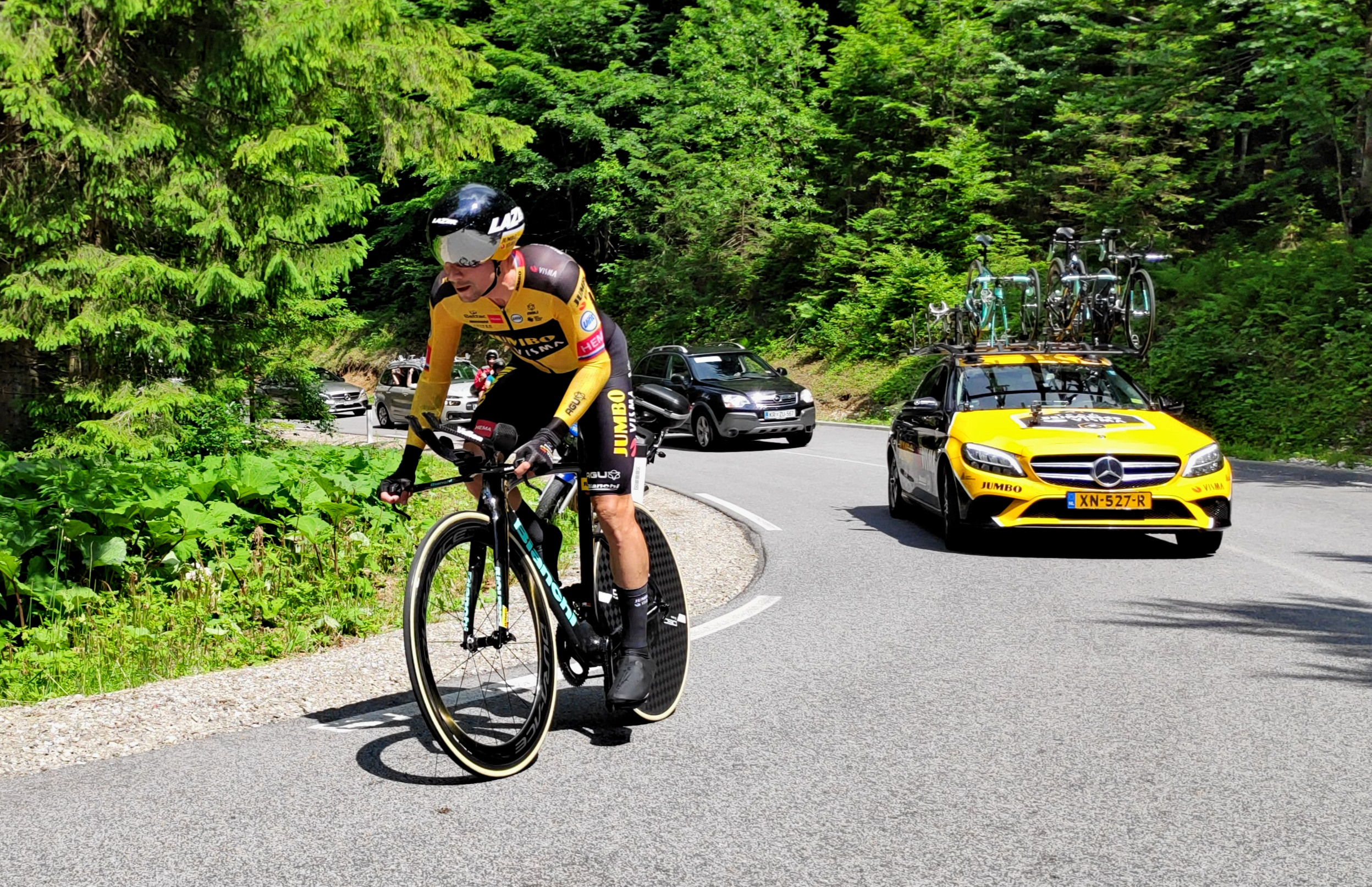
- Primož Roglič at the 2020 Slovenian National Time Trial championship
- Status: UCI WorldTeam
- Manager: Richard Plugge
- Main sponsor(s): Jumbo & Visma
- Based: Netherlands
- Bicycles: Bianchi
- Groupset: Shimano

Season victories
- One-day races: 4
- Stage race overall: 1
- Stage race stages: 15
- Grand Tours: 1
- National Championships: 2
- Most wins: Primož Roglič (14)
- Best ranked rider: Primož Roglič (1st)
- Jersey

The 2020 season for the Team Jumbo–Visma road cycling team began in January at the Tour Down Under.

== Team roster ==
As of 1 January 2020.

Rider	Date of birth
George Bennett (NZL)	7 April 1990 (aged 29)
Koen Bouwman (NED)	2 December 1993 (aged 26)
Laurens De Plus (BEL)	4 September 1995 (aged 24)
Tom Dumoulin (NED)	11 November 1990 (aged 29)
Pascal Eenkhoorn (NED)	8 February 1997 (aged 22)
Tobias Foss (NOR)	25 May 1997 (aged 22)
Robert Gesink (NED)	31 May 1986 (aged 33)
Dylan Groenewegen (NED)	21 June 1993 (aged 26)
Chris Harper (AUS)	23 November 1994 (aged 25)
Lennard Hofstede (NED)	29 December 1994 (aged 25)
Amund Grøndahl Jansen (NOR)	11 February 1994 (aged 25)
Steven Kruijswijk (NED)	7 June 1987 (aged 32)
Sepp Kuss (USA)	13 September 1994 (aged 25)
Tom Leezer (NED)	26 December 1985 (aged 34)

Rider	Date of birth
Bert-Jan Lindeman (NED)	16 June 1989 (aged 30)
Paul Martens (GER)	26 October 1983 (aged 36)
Tony Martin (GER)	23 April 1985 (aged 34)
Christoph Pfingsten (GER)	20 November 1987 (aged 32)
Primož Roglič (SLO)	29 October 1989 (aged 30)
Timo Roosen (NED)	11 January 1993 (aged 26)
Mike Teunissen (NED)	25 August 1992 (aged 27)
Antwan Tolhoek (NED)	29 April 1994 (aged 25)
Wout van Aert (BEL)	15 September 1994 (aged 25)
Taco van der Hoorn (NED)	4 December 1993 (aged 26)
Jos van Emden (NED)	27 June 1985 (aged 34)
Jonas Vingegaard (DEN)	10 December 1996 (aged 23)
Maarten Wynants (BEL)	13 May 1982 (aged 37)

Riders who joined the team for the 2020 season

Rider	2019 team
Tom Dumoulin	Team Sunweb
Tobias Foss	Uno-X Norwegian Development Team
Chris Harper	Team BridgeLane
Christoph Pfingsten	Bora–Hansgrohe

Riders who left the team during or after the 2019 season

Rider	2020 team
Floris De Tier	Alpecin–Fenix
Daan Olivier	Retires
Neilson Powless	EF Pro Cycling
Danny van Poppel	Circus–Wanty Gobert

== Season victories ==
Date	Race	Competition	Rider	Country	Location
5 February	Volta a la Comunitat Valenciana, Stage 1	UCI Europe Tour; UCI ProSeries	Dylan Groenewegen (NED)	Spain	Villareal
7 February	Volta a la Comunitat Valenciana, Stage 3	UCI Europe Tour; UCI ProSeries	Dylan Groenewegen (NED)	Spain	Torrevieja
9 February	Volta a la Comunitat Valenciana, Points classification	UCI Europe Tour; UCI ProSeries	Dylan Groenewegen (NED)	Spain	
29 February	UAE Tour, Stage 4	UCI World Tour	Dylan Groenewegen (NED)	United Arab Emirates	Dubai City Walk
1 August	Strade Bianche	UCI World Tour	Wout van Aert (BEL)	Italy	Siena
8 August	Tour de l'Ain, Stage 2	UCI Europe Tour	Primož Roglič (SLO)	France	Lélex Monts-Jura
8 August	Milan–San Remo	UCI World Tour	Wout van Aert (BEL)	Italy	Sanremo
9 August	Tour de l'Ain, Stage 3	UCI Europe Tour	Primož Roglič (SLO)	France	Grand Colombier
9 August	Tour de l'Ain, Overall	UCI Europe Tour	Primož Roglič (SLO)	France	
9 August	Tour de l'Ain, Points classification	UCI Europe Tour	Primož Roglič (SLO)	France	
9 August	Tour de l'Ain, Teams classification	UCI Europe Tour	(Note: The riders in the squad were George Bennett, Tom Dumoulin, Robert Gesink, Steven Kruijswijk, Tony Martin, and Primož Roglič.)	France	
9 August	Czech Cycling Tour, Mountains classification	UCI Europe Tour	Koen Bouwman (NED)	Czech Republic	
12 August	Critérium du Dauphiné, Stage 1	UCI World Tour	Wout van Aert (BEL)	France	Saint-Christo-en-Jarez
12 August	Gran Piemonte	UCI Europe Tour; UCI ProSeries	George Bennett (NZL)	Italy	Barolo
13 August	Critérium du Dauphiné, Stage 2	UCI World Tour	Primož Roglič (SLO)	France	Col de Porte
16 August	Critérium du Dauphiné, Stage 5	UCI World Tour	Sepp Kuss (USA)	France	Megève
16 August	Critérium du Dauphiné, Points classification	UCI World Tour	Wout van Aert (BEL)	France	
16 August	Critérium du Dauphiné, Teams classification	UCI World Tour	(Note: The riders in the squad were Tom Dumoulin, Robert Gesink, Steven Kruijswijk, Sepp Kuss, Tony Martin, Primož Roglič, and Wout van Aert.)	France	
1 September	Tour de France, Stage 4	UCI World Tour	Primož Roglič (SLO)	France	Orcières-Merlette
2 September	Tour de France, Stage 5	UCI World Tour	Wout van Aert (BEL)	France	Privas
2 September	Tour de Hongrie, Teams classification	UCI Europe Tour	(Note: The riders in the squad were Koen Bouwman, Tobias Foss, Lennard Hofstede, Chris Harper, Bert-Jan Lindeman, and Antwan Tolhoek.)	Hungary	
4 September	Tour de France, Stage 7	UCI World Tour	Wout van Aert (BEL)	France	Lavaur
4 October	Liège–Bastogne–Liège	UCI World Tour	Primož Roglič (SLO)	Belgium	Liège
20 October	Vuelta a España, Stage 1	UCI World Tour	Primož Roglič (SLO)	Spain	Arrate
28 October	Vuelta a España, Stage 8	UCI World Tour	Primož Roglič (SLO)	Spain	Alto de Moncalvillo
30 October	Vuelta a España, Stage 10	UCI World Tour	Primož Roglič (SLO)	Spain	Suances
3 November	Vuelta a España, Stage 13	UCI World Tour	Primož Roglič (SLO)	Spain	Mirador de Ézaro
8 November	Vuelta a España, Overall	UCI World Tour	Primož Roglič (SLO)	Spain	
8 November	Vuelta a España, Points classification	UCI World Tour	Primož Roglič (SLO)	Spain	

== National, Continental and World champions 2020 ==
Date	Discipline	Jersey	Rider	Country	Location
21 June	Slovenian National Road Championship		Primož Roglič (SLO)	Slovenia	Ambrož pod Krvavcem
20 August	Belgian National Time Trial Championships		Wout Van Aert (BEL)	Belgium	Koksijde
