= Justin Jules =

French road racing cyclist

Jules
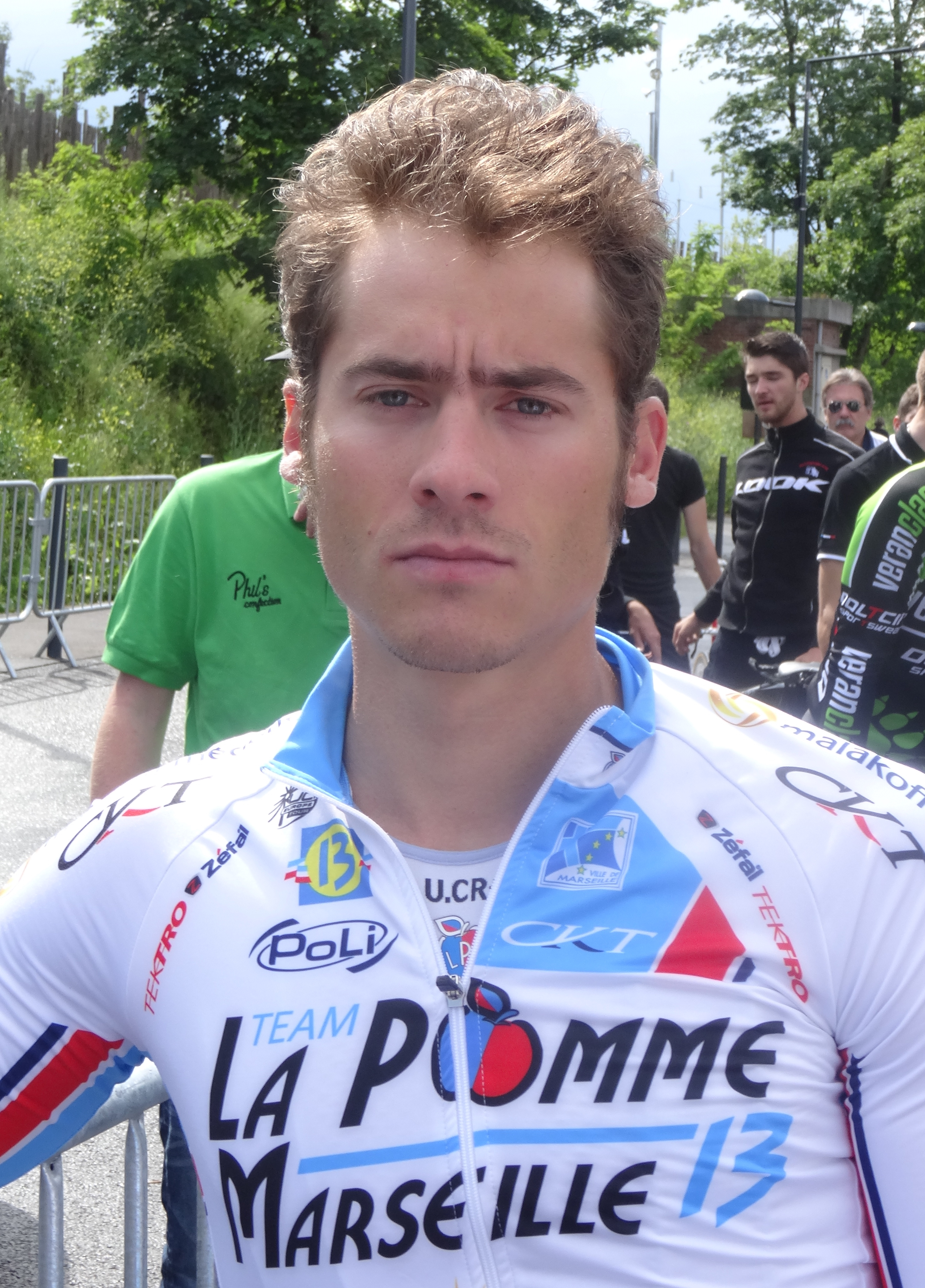
- Jules at the 2014 Paris–Arras Tour

Personal information
- Full name: Justin Jules
- Born: 20 September 1986 (age 40) Sartrouville, France
- Height: 1.67 m (5 ft 6 in)
- Weight: 64 kg (141 lb)

Cycling career
- Sport: Cycling
- Discipline: Road
- Role: Rider
- Rider type: Sprinter

Amateur teams
- 2006: VC Les Mureaux
- 2007: CA Mantes
- 2008–2009: OC Val d'Oise
- 2010: Vendée U–Pays de la Loire

Professional teams
- 2011: La Pomme Marseille
- 2012: Véranda Rideau–Super U
- 2013–2014: La Pomme Marseille
- 2015–2016: Veranclassic–Ekoi
- 2017–2019: WB Veranclassic Aqua Protect
- 2020–2021: Nippo–Delko–One Provence

Justin Jules (born 20 September 1986) is a French professional road bicycle racer, who most recently rode for UCI ProTeam Delko.

== Personal life ==
Born in Sartrouville, he is the son of Pascal Jules, a professional cyclist who was active during the 1980s – achieving one Tour de France stage victory in 1984 – who died in a road traffic accident when Justin was just over a year old.

In 2008, Jules was sentenced to three years in prison for the manslaughter of his step-father in 2004. The sentence had been reduced due to a complicated upbringing and his step-father's troubles with alcoholism.

== Career ==
Jules has competed as a professional since the start of the 2011 season, as the La Pomme Marseille team he had joined from the Vendée U-Pays de la Loire team, successfully became a Continental team. Jules achieved his first professional victory at the 2011 Tour of Hainan, when he won the first stage of the race, and held the overall race lead for a week. After a spell with the Véranda Rideau-Super U squad in 2012, Jules rejoined La Pomme Marseille for the 2013 season. In his first race since rejoining, Jules won a bunch sprint for the honours in the season-opening race of the 2013 UCI Europe Tour, the Grand Prix d'Ouverture La Marseillaise; he managed to hold off the advances of Ag2r–La Mondiale's Samuel Dumoulin and Argos–Shimano rider Thomas Damuseau, for victory.

== Major results ==
2009
5th Tour du Gâtinais
2010
3rd Overall Circuit des Plages Vendéennes

1st Stage 7

3rd GP Christian Fenioux
4th Overall Saint Brieuc Agglo-Tour
2011
1st Stage 1 Tour of Hainan
5th Tour du Finistère
8th Grand Prix de la ville de Nogent-sur-Oise
2012
5th Overall Circuit des Plages Vendéennes
8th Tour du Finistère
2013
1st Grand Prix d'Ouverture La Marseillaise
3rd Route Adélie
5th Classic Loire Atlantique
6th Val d'Ille Classic
8th Overall Tour du Haut Var
10th Tour of Nanjing
2014
1st Stage 5 Tour d'Azerbaïdjan
5th Overall Ronde de l'Oise
10th Châteauroux Classic
2015
1st Stage 1 Tour de Tunisie
2nd Nokere Koerse
4th Overall Tour de Gironde
5th Overall Tour du Maroc

1st Points classification
1st Stage 5

6th Grand Prix de la ville de Nogent-sur-Oise
6th Halle–Ingooigem
7th Omloop van het Waasland
10th Cholet-Pays de Loire
10th Grand Prix Criquielion
2016
1st Grote Prijs Stad Sint-Niklaas
1st Stage 8 Tour du Maroc
1st Stage 2 Tour de Tunisie
5th Antwerpse Havenpijl
5th UAE Cup
7th Omloop Mandel-Leie-Schelde
8th Memorial Van Coningsloo
9th Gooikse Pijl
2017
1st Stage 1 Circuit de la Sarthe
2nd Tour de Vendée
3rd Overall Tour de Normandie

1st Points classification
1st Stage 4

3rd Grand Prix de la Ville de Lillers
3rd Grote Prijs Jef Scherens
4th Druivenkoers Overijse
4th Paris–Bourges
6th Paris–Troyes
6th Grand Prix de Fourmies
7th Overall Tour La Provence

1st Stage 1

2018
3rd Overall Circuit de la Sarthe

1st Stage 1

3rd Omloop Mandel-Leie-Schelde
4th Grand Prix Criquielion
5th Kuurne–Brussels–Kuurne
6th Druivenkoers Overijse
7th Overall Tour of Norway
8th Overall Volta ao Alentejo
2019
2nd Volta Limburg Classic
5th Three Days of Bruges–De Panne
6th Grand Prix de Denain
7th Nokere Koerse
9th Overall Vuelta a Aragón

1st Points classification
1st Stage 1
