= Luca Mozzato =

Italian cyclist (born 1998)

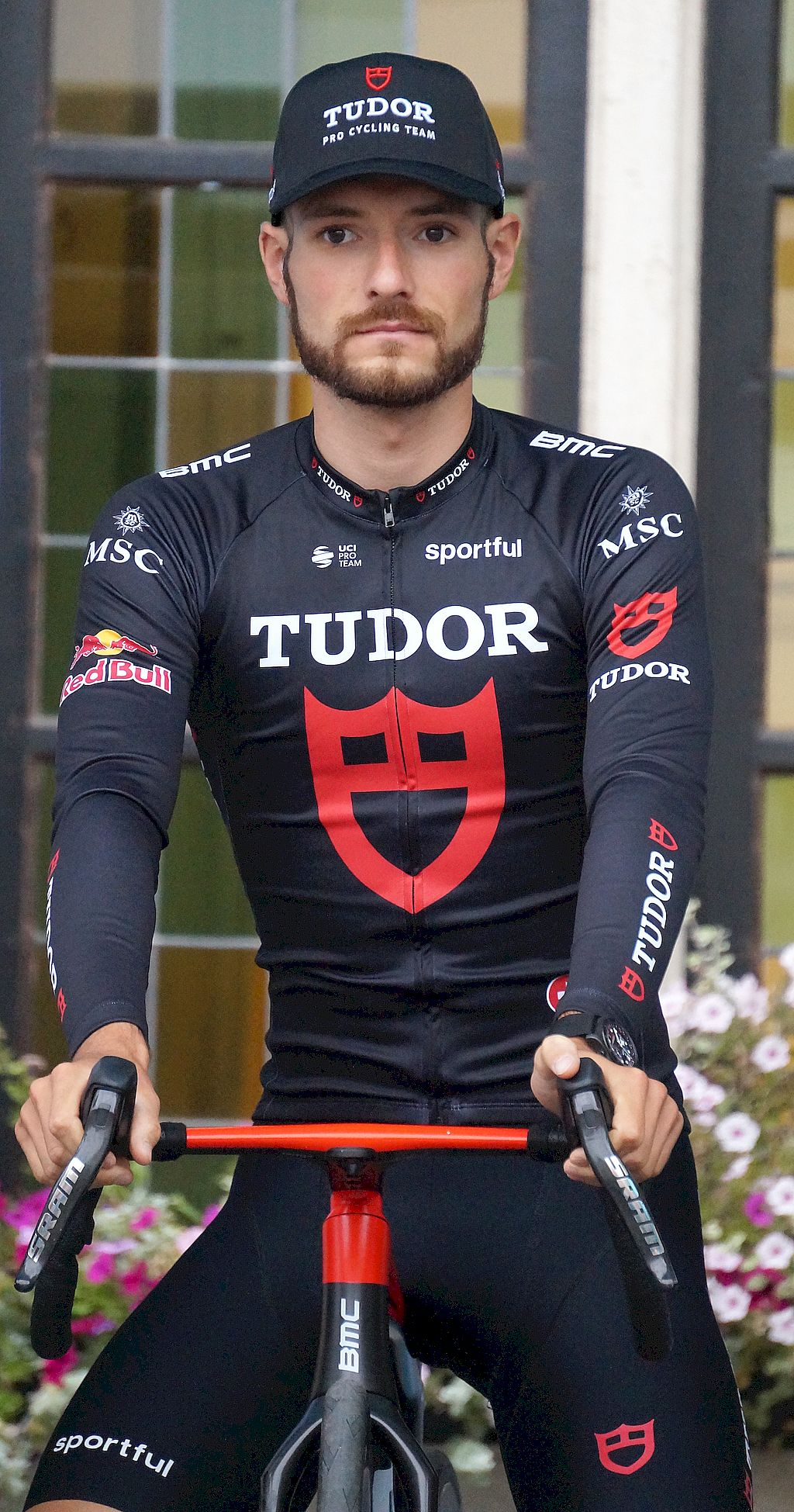
- Mozzato in 2026

Personal information
- Born: 15 February 1998 (age 28) Arzignano, Italy
- Height: 1.78 m (5 ft 10 in)
- Weight: 67 kg (148 lb)

Cycling career
- Sport: Cycling
- Current team: Arkéa–B&B Hotels
- Discipline: Road
- Role: Rider
- Rider type: Sprinter

Amateur team
- 2017: Zalf–Euromobil–Désirée–Fior

Professional teams
- 2018–2019: Dimension Data for Qhubeka
- 2020–2022: B&B Hotels–Vital Concept
- 2023–2025: Arkéa–Samsic
- 2026-: Tudor Pro Cycling Team

Major wins
- One-day races and Classics Bredene Koksijde Classic (2024)

Luca Mozzato (born 15 February 1998) is an Italian cyclist, who currently rides for UCI WorldTeam Arkéa–B&B Hotels.

Mozzato initially signed a contract extension until 2025 with B&B Hotels–KTM in July 2022 but after the team collapsed in December of that year he signed with UCI WorldTeam Arkéa–Samsic for 2023. He won his first professional races that year, taking the title at Binche–Chimay–Binche as well as on stage two of the Tour du Limousin. In March 2024, he outsprinted Dylan Groenewegen to win the Bredene Koksijde Classic. Two weeks later, he won the sprint for second at the Tour of Flanders, just over a minute behind winner Mathieu van der Poel.

In 2026, Mozzato signet a contract with Swiss team Tudor Pro Cycling Team until the end of the 2028 season.

== Major results ==
2015
1st Trofeo comune di Vertova
3rd Trofeo Buffoni
6th Trofeo Emilio Paganessi
2016
1st Gran Premio Sportivi di Sovilla
2nd Trofeo comune di Vertova
4th Road race, UCI Junior Road World Championships
8th Trofeo Buffoni
2018
4th Ruota d'Oro
6th La Popolarissima
8th Trofeo Città di Brescia
2019
1st Circuito del Porto
2nd Trofeo Città di Brescia
5th Ruota d'Oro
6th Overall Tour de Bretagne
7th Trofeo Città di San Vendemiano
2020
4th Grand Prix d'Isbergues
6th Paris–Camembert
2021
3rd Nokere Koerse
3rd Egmont Cycling Race
6th Grote Prijs Marcel Kint
7th Scheldeprijs
7th Overall Deutschland Tour
8th Eurométropole Tour
8th La Roue Tourangelle
8th Elfstedenronde
2022
2nd Tro-Bro Léon
2nd Grote Prijs Marcel Kint
4th Kampioenschap van Vlaanderen
4th Grand Prix d'Isbergues
5th Paris–Tours
5th Grand Prix du Morbihan
6th Paris–Bourges
8th Bredene Koksijde Classic
8th Paris–Camembert
8th Paris–Chauny
10th Grand Prix de Fourmies
2023 (2 pro wins)
1st Binche–Chimay–Binche
1st Stage 2 Tour du Limousin
5th Le Samyn
5th Omloop van het Houtland
6th Giro del Veneto
6th Rund um Köln
2024 (1)
1st Bredene Koksijde Classic
2nd Tour of Flanders
5th Veenendaal–Veenendaal
6th Circuit de Wallonie
7th Tro-Bro Léon
7th Grand Prix Criquielion
8th Clàssica Comunitat Valenciana 1969
10th Classic Brugge–De Panne
10th Paris–Chauny
2025
6th Antwerp Port Epic
6th Grand Prix d'Isbergues
8th Polynormande
9th Paris–Chauny
10th Grand Prix de Fourmies
10th Binche–Chimay–Binche
2026
2nd Kuurne–Brussels–Kuurne
5th Tour of Bruges
7th Gent–Wevelgem
7th Bredene Koksijde Classic

=== Grand Tour general classification results timeline ===
Grand Tour	2022	2023	2024	2025
Giro d'Italia	—	—	—	138
Tour de France	104	132	137	—
Vuelta a España	—	—	—	—

Legend
—	Did not compete
DNF	Did not finish
