= Alexis Renard =

French cyclist

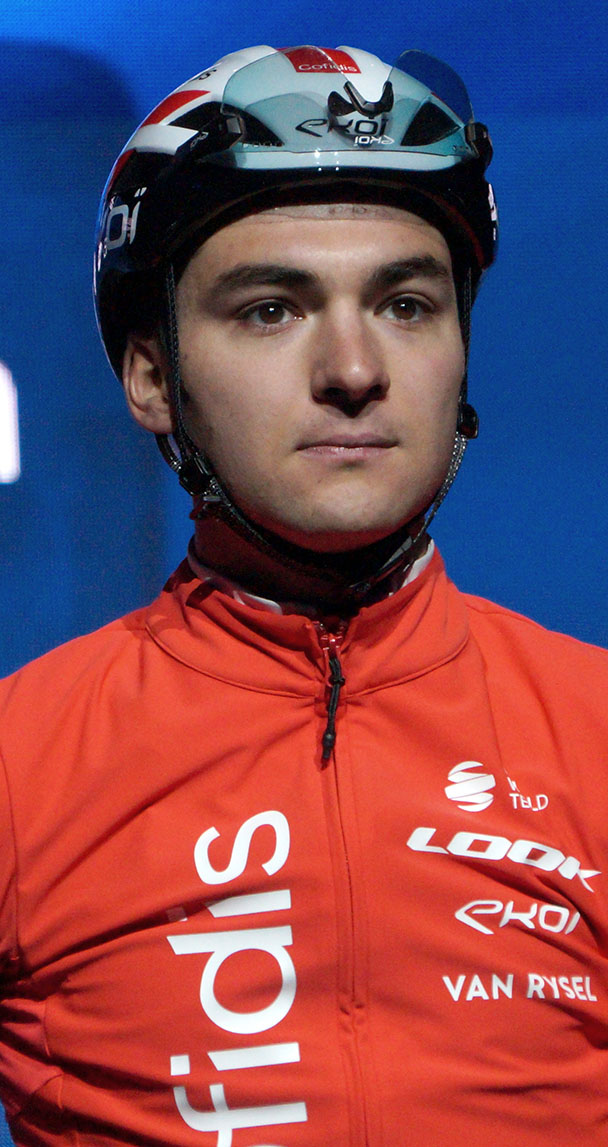
- Renard in 2023

Personal information
- Full name: Alexis Renard
- Born: 1 June 1999 (age 27) Saint-Brieuc, France
- Height: 1.86 m (6 ft 1 in)
- Weight: 74 kg (163 lb)

Cycling career
- Sport: Cycling
- Current team: Cofidis
- Discipline: Road
- Role: Rider

Amateur teams
- 2013–2017: CC Plancoet
- 2018–2019: Côtes d'Armor–Marie Morin

Professional teams
- 2019: Israel Cycling Academy (stagiaire)
- 2020–2021: Israel Start-Up Nation
- 2022–: Cofidis

Alexis Renard (born 1 June 1999) is a French cyclist, who currently rides for UCI WorldTeam Cofidis.

== Major results ==
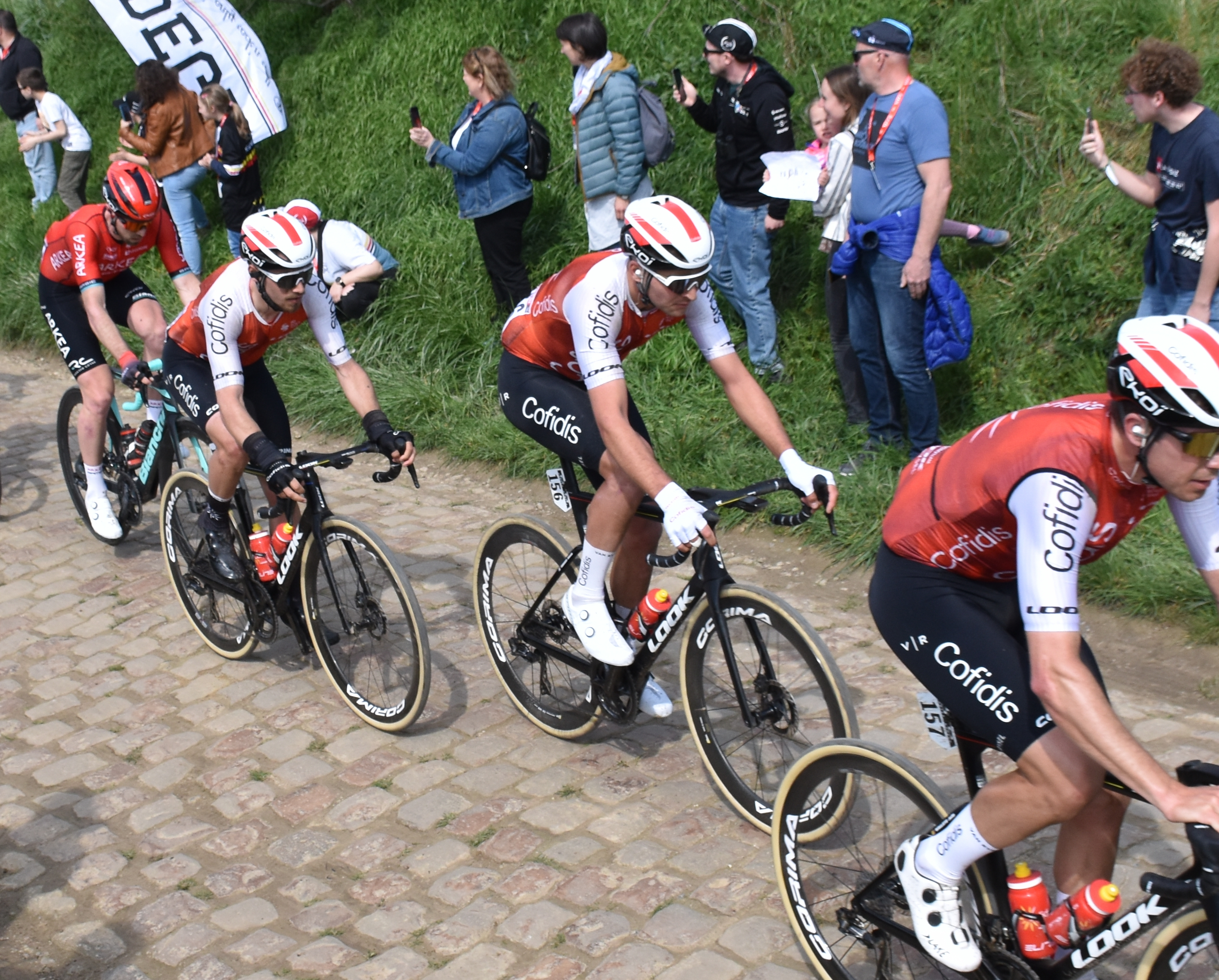
Paris-Roubaix 2023 - Secteur pavé de Quiévy à Saint-Python - N°156 Alexis Renard.

2016
1st Stage 3 Ronde des Vallées
2017
1st Grand Prix Bob Jungels
2nd Overall Grand Prix Rüebliland

1st Stage 1

3rd Road race, National Junior Road Championships
5th Overall Tour du Valromey

1st Stage 1

7th Overall Ronde des Vallées

1st Stage 2 (ITT)

2019
1st Road race, National Amateur Road Championships
2021
2nd Münsterland Giro
3rd Overall Tour de Wallonie
2022
7th Overall Circuit de la Sarthe
10th Overall Saudi Tour
2023
5th Gooikse Pijl
7th Overall Four Days of Dunkirk
7th Gent–Wevelgem
2024
2nd Cholet-Pays de la Loire
5th Paris–Tours
2025
2nd Copenhagen Sprint
7th Classic Brugge–De Panne
2026 (1 pro win)
1st Tour de Vendée
2nd Tro-Bro Léon
6th Paris–Chauny
7th Cholet Agglo Tour
8th Bredene Koksijde Classic
9th Omloop Het Nieuwsblad
9th Grand Prix d'Isbergues

=== Grand Tour general classification results timeline ===
Grand Tour	2020	2021	2022	2023	2024	2025	2026
Giro d'Italia	—	—	—	—	—	—	—
Tour de France	—	—	—	DNF	DNF	145	—
Vuelta a España	DNF	—	—	—	—	—	DNF

Legend
—	Did not compete
DNF	Did not finish
