= Arvid de Kleijn =

Dutch cyclist (born 1994)

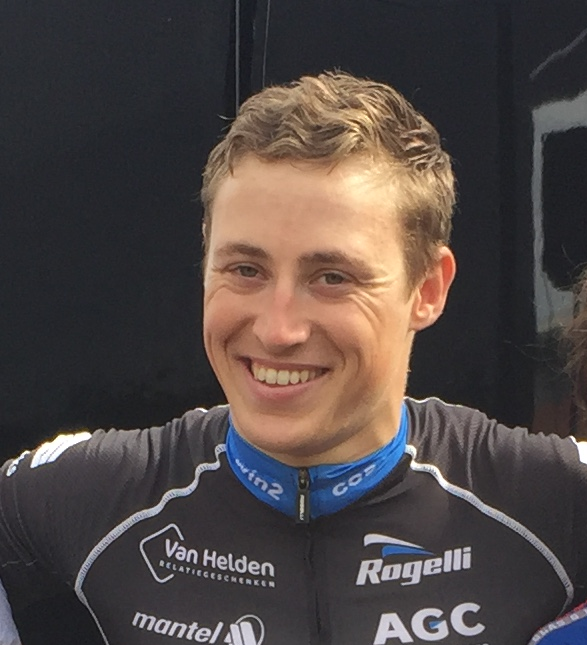

Personal information
- Full name: Arvid de Kleijn
- Born: 21 March 1994 (age 32) Herveld, Netherlands
- Height: 1.71 m (5 ft 7 in)
- Weight: 68 kg (150 lb)

Cycling career
- Sport: Cycling
- Current team: Tudor Pro Cycling Team
- Discipline: Road
- Role: Rider
- Rider type: Sprinter

Professional teams
- 2015–2016: Cyclingteam Jo Piels
- 2017: Baby-Dump Cyclingteam
- 2018–2019: Metec–TKH
- 2020: Riwal Readynez
- 2021–2022: Rally Cycling
- 2023–: Tudor Pro Cycling Team

Major wins
- One-day races and Classics Milano–Torino (2023) GP de Fourmies (2024, 2026)

Arvid de Kleijn (born 21 March 1994) is a Dutch cyclist, who currently rides for UCI ProTeam Tudor Pro Cycling Team. He previously competed for Rally Cycling, and was the team's first-ever European squad member, when he joined for the 2021 season.

== Major results ==
2016
1st Paris–Tours Espoirs
2nd GP Horsens
4th Nationale Sluitingprijs
4th Fyen Rundt
5th Road race, National Under-23 Road Championships
2017 (1 pro win)
1st Nationale Sluitingsprijs
1st Antwerpse Havenpijl
1st Stage 3 Tour du Loir-et-Cher
2nd Ronde van Noord-Holland
2nd Ronde van Limburg
4th Grote Prijs Stad Sint-Niklaas
4th Ronde van Overijssel
5th Road race, National Road Championships
8th Arnhem–Veenendaal Classic
9th Arno Wallaard Memorial
2019 (1)
1st Midden–Brabant Poort Omloop
1st Druivenkoers Overijse
1st Stage 1 Course de Solidarność et des Champions Olympiques
1st Stage 3 Tour du Loir-et-Cher
1st Mountains classification, Tour du Loir-et-Cher
1st Stage 4 Kreiz Breizh Elites
2nd Overall Tour de Normandie

1st Stage 3

2nd De Kustpijl
3rd Tacx Pro Classic
4th Ster van Zwolle
5th Gooikse Pijl
5th Course Cycliste de Solidarnosc et des Champions Olympiques
7th Veenendaal–Veenendaal Classic
9th Tour du Loir et Cher E Provost
2020
3rd Gooikse Pijl
7th Scheldeprijs
2021 (2)
1st Stage 1 Tour of Turkey
1st Route Adélie
5th Paris–Chauny
6th Omloop van het Houtland
8th Gran Piemonte
2022 (1)
1st Stage 1 Four Days of Dunkirk
9th Veenendaal–Veenendaal Classic
2023 (6)
1st Milano–Torino
Tour de Langkawi

1st Points classification
1st Stages 1 & 6

1st Stage 3 Boucles de la Mayenne
1st Stage 3 ZLM Tour
1st Stage 4 Deutschland Tour
2nd Veenendaal–Veenendaal Classic
4th La Roue Tourangelle
10th Grand Prix Criquielion
2024 (5)
1st Grand Prix de Fourmies
1st Grand Prix d'Isbergues
Tour de Langkawi

1st Stages 4 & 5

1st Stage 2 Paris–Nice
2nd Kampioenschap van Vlaanderen
7th Bredene Koksijde Classic
2025 (2)
Tour de Langkawi

1st Stages 2 & 6

7th Grand Prix de Fourmies
2026 (1)
1st Grand Prix de Fourmies
3rd Grand Prix d'Isbergues
4th Kampioenschap van Vlaanderen
10th Münsterland Giro
