= 2023 Milano–Torino =

104th edition of the Milano–Torino cycling classic

- 2023 UCI ProSeries

Race details
- Dates: 15 March 2023
- Stages: 1
- Distance: 192 km (119.3 mi)
- Winning time: 3h 59' 02"

Results
	Winner	Arvid de Kleijn (NED)	(Tudor Pro Cycling Team)
	Second	Fernando Gaviria (COL)	(Movistar Team)
	Third	Casper van Uden (NED)	(Team DSM)

The 2023 Milano–Torino was the 104th edition of the Milano–Torino cycling classic. It was held on 15 March 2023 as a category 1.Pro race on the 2023 UCI ProSeries calendar.

The race began in Rho, on the outskirts of Milan, and finished in Orbassano, on the outskirts of Turin

== Teams ==
Ten of the 18 UCI WorldTeams and seven UCI ProTeams made up the 17 teams that participated in the race. Of these teams, 15 entered a full squad of seven riders, while Israel–Premier Tech, Trek–Segafredo entered five riders.

UCI WorldTeams

- AG2R Citroën Team
- Arkéa–Samsic
- Astana Qazaqstan Team
- Bora–Hansgrohe
- EF Education–EasyPost
- Intermarché–Circus–Wanty
- Movistar Team
- Team Jayco–AlUla
- Team DSM
- Trek–Segafredo

UCI ProTeams

- Bingoal WB
- Green Project–Bardiani–CSF–Faizanè
- Eolo–Kometa
- Israel–Premier Tech
- Q36.5 Pro Cycling Team
- Team Corratec
- Tudor Pro Cycling Team

== Result ==
Result (1–10)
Rank	Rider	Team	Time
1	Arvid de Kleijn (NED)	Tudor Pro Cycling Team	3h 59' 02"
2	Fernando Gaviria (COL)	Movistar Team	+ 0"
3	Casper van Uden (NED)	Team DSM	+ 0"
4	Itamar Einhorn (ISR)	Israel–Premier Tech	+ 0"
5	Matteo Moschetti (ITA)	Q36.5 Pro Cycling Team	+ 0"
6	Nacer Bouhanni (FRA)	Arkéa–Samsic	+ 0"
7	Jordi Meeus (BEL)	Bora–Hansgrohe	+ 0"
8	Andrea Vendrame (ITA)	AG2R Citroën Team	+ 0"
9	Jon Aberasturi (ESP)	Trek–Segafredo	+ 0"
10	Dylan Groenewegen (NED)	Team Jayco–AlUla	+ 0"
