= 2017 Circuit de la Sarthe =

Race details
- Dates: 4–7 April 2017
- Stages: 4, including one split stage
- Distance: 656.9 km (408.2 mi)
- Winning time: 16h 44' 34"

Results
Jersey awarded to the overall winner	Winner	Lilian Calmejane (FRA)	(Direct Énergie)
	Second	Arthur Vichot (FRA)	(FDJ)
	Third	Jonathan Castroviejo (ESP)	(Movistar Team)
Jersey awarded to the points classification winner	Points	Bryan Coquard (FRA)	(Direct Énergie)
Jersey awarded to the mountains classification winner	Mountains	Ángel Madrazo (ESP)	(Delko–Marseille Provence KTM)
Jersey awarded to the youth classification winner	Youth	Wilmar Paredes (COL)	(Team Manzana Postobón)
	Team	Movistar Team	

The 2017 Circuit de la Sarthe–Pays de Loire was the 65th edition of the Circuit de la Sarthe cycling stage race. It was held in the Sarthe department between 4 and 7 April 2017 and consisted of five stages, two of which took place on the same day. It was rated as a 2.1 event on the 2017 UCI Europe Tour.

Direct Énergie rider Lilian Calmejane took his third stage race win of the 2017 season, with a three-second margin of victory over French national champion Arthur Vichot, riding for the FDJ team. Calmejane took the overall lead of the race after winning the penultimate stage of the race, and maintained the lead despite Vichot's best efforts on the final stage. The overall podium was completed by Jonathan Castroviejo (Movistar Team), a further ten seconds in arrears of Vichot.

There were final-day lead changes in both the points and mountains classifications; Calmejane was usurped by teammate Bryan Coquard in the points, after his second stage win of the race, while Ángel Madrazo (Delko–Marseille Provence KTM) overtook another Direct Énergie rider, Paul Ourselin, to take the victory in the mountains classification. Team Manzana Postobón rider Wilmar Paredes won the young rider classification for 16th place overall, while the Movistar Team won the teams classification.

== Teams ==
Sixteen teams were invited to start the race. These included three UCI WorldTeams and thirteen UCI Professional Continental teams.

UCI WorldTeams

- AG2R La Mondiale
- FDJ
- Movistar Team

UCI Professional Continental teams

- Aqua Blue Sport
- Cofidis
- Delko–Marseille Provence KTM
- Direct Énergie
- Gazprom–RusVelo
- Team Manzana Postobón
- Team Novo Nordisk
- Roompot–Nederlandse Loterij
- Sport Vlaanderen–Baloise
- Wanty–Groupe Gobert
- WB Veranclassic Aqua Protect
- Androni–Sidermec–Bottecchia
- Fortuneo–Vital Concept

== Route ==
The race included five stages; four road stages and an individual time trial.

Stage schedule
Stage	Date	Route	Distance	Type	Winner
1	4 April	Pouzauges to Pouzauges	173.2 km (108 mi)	Hilly stage	Justin Jules (FRA)
2a	5 April	Ligné to Angers	99.8 km (62 mi)	Flat stage	Bryan Coquard (FRA)
2b	5 April	Angers to Angers	6.8 km (4 mi)	Individual time trial	Alex Dowsett (GBR)
3	6 April	Angers to Pré-en-Pail-Saint-Samson	190.3 km (118 mi)	Hilly stage	Lilian Calmejane (FRA)
4	7 April	L'Épau Abbey to Saint-Calais	186.8 km (116 mi)	Hilly stage	Bryan Coquard (FRA)

== Stages ==
=== Stage 1 ===
4 April 2017 — Pouzauges to Pouzauges, 173.2 km (108 mi)

Result of Stage 1
Rank	Rider	Team	Time
1	Justin Jules (FRA)	WB Veranclassic Aqua Protect	4h 15' 43"
2	Arthur Vichot (FRA)	FDJ	+ 0"
3	Andrea Vendrame (ITA)	Androni–Sidermec–Bottecchia	+ 0"
4	Lilian Calmejane (FRA)	Direct Énergie	+ 0"
5	Roman Maikin (RUS)	Gazprom–RusVelo	+ 0"
6	Alex Kirsch (LUX)	WB Veranclassic Aqua Protect	+ 0"
7	Clément Venturini (FRA)	Cofidis	+ 0"
8	Nick van der Lijke (NED)	Roompot–Nederlandse Loterij	+ 0"
9	Romain Hardy (FRA)	Fortuneo–Vital Concept	+ 0"
10	Julien Simon (FRA)	Cofidis	+ 0"

General classification after Stage 1
Rank	Rider	Team	Time
1	Justin Jules (FRA)	WB Veranclassic Aqua Protect	4h 15' 33"
2	Ángel Madrazo (ESP)	Delko–Marseille Provence KTM	+ 2"
3	Arthur Vichot (FRA)	FDJ	+ 3"
4	Andrea Vendrame (ITA)	Androni–Sidermec–Bottecchia	+ 6"
5	Bryan Coquard (FRA)	Direct Énergie	+ 9"
6	Maxime Bouet (FRA)	Fortuneo–Vital Concept	+ 9"
7	Lilian Calmejane (FRA)	Direct Énergie	+ 10"
8	Roman Maikin (RUS)	Gazprom–RusVelo	+ 10"
9	Alex Kirsch (LUX)	WB Veranclassic Aqua Protect	+ 10"
10	Clément Venturini (FRA)	Cofidis	+ 10"

=== Stage 2a ===
5 April 2017 — Ligné to Angers, 99.8 km (62 mi)

Result of Stage 2a
Rank	Rider	Team	Time
1	Bryan Coquard (FRA)	Direct Énergie	2h 19' 55"
2	Matteo Malucelli (ITA)	Androni–Sidermec–Bottecchia	+ 0"
3	Clément Venturini (FRA)	Cofidis	+ 0"
4	Justin Jules (FRA)	WB Veranclassic Aqua Protect	+ 0"
5	Danilo Napolitano (ITA)	Wanty–Groupe Gobert	+ 0"
6	Michel Kreder (NED)	Aqua Blue Sport	+ 0"
7	Raymond Kreder (NED)	Roompot–Nederlandse Loterij	+ 0"
8	Benoît Jarrier (FRA)	Fortuneo–Vital Concept	+ 0"
9	Carlos Barbero (ESP)	Movistar Team	+ 0"
10	Christophe Noppe (BEL)	Sport Vlaanderen–Baloise	+ 0"

General classification after Stage 2a
Rank	Rider	Team	Time
1	Justin Jules (FRA)	WB Veranclassic Aqua Protect	6h 35' 28"
2	Arthur Vichot (FRA)	FDJ	+ 2"
3	Ángel Madrazo (ESP)	Delko–Marseille Provence KTM	+ 2"
4	Bryan Coquard (FRA)	Direct Énergie	+ 3"
5	Andrea Vendrame (ITA)	Androni–Sidermec–Bottecchia	+ 6"
6	Clément Venturini (FRA)	Cofidis	+ 8"
7	Maxime Bouet (FRA)	Fortuneo–Vital Concept	+ 9"
8	Roman Maikin (RUS)	Gazprom–RusVelo	+ 10"
9	Benoît Jarrier (FRA)	Fortuneo–Vital Concept	+ 10"
10	Michel Kreder (NED)	Aqua Blue Sport	+ 10"

=== Stage 2b ===
5 April 2017 — Angers to Angers, 6.8 km (4 mi), individual time trial (ITT)

Result of Stage 2b
Rank	Rider	Team	Time
1	Alex Dowsett (GBR)	Movistar Team	7' 49"
2	Jonathan Castroviejo (ESP)	Movistar Team	+ 8"
3	Arthur Vichot (FRA)	FDJ	+ 10"
4	Daniele Bennati (ITA)	Movistar Team	+ 10"
5	Johan Le Bon (FRA)	FDJ	+ 17"
6	Marc Fournier (FRA)	FDJ	+ 19"
7	Lilian Calmejane (FRA)	Direct Énergie	+ 19"
8	Benoît Jarrier (FRA)	Fortuneo–Vital Concept	+ 20"
9	Ignatas Konovalovas (LTU)	FDJ	+ 22"
10	Arnaud Gérard (FRA)	Fortuneo–Vital Concept	+ 22"

General classification after Stage 2b
Rank	Rider	Team	Time
1	Alex Dowsett (GBR)	Movistar Team	6h 43' 27"
2	Arthur Vichot (FRA)	FDJ	+ 2"
3	Jonathan Castroviejo (ESP)	Movistar Team	+ 8"
4	Daniele Bennati (ITA)	Movistar Team	+ 10"
5	Lilian Calmejane (FRA)	Direct Énergie	+ 19"
6	Benoît Jarrier (FRA)	Fortuneo–Vital Concept	+ 20"
7	Ignatas Konovalovas (LTU)	FDJ	+ 22"
8	Oscar Riesebeek (NED)	Roompot–Nederlandse Loterij	+ 23"
9	Bryan Coquard (FRA)	Direct Énergie	+ 24"
10	Julien Simon (FRA)	Cofidis	+ 25"

=== Stage 3 ===
6 April 2017 — Angers to Pré-en-Pail-Saint-Samson, 190.3 km (118 mi)

Result of Stage 3
Rank	Rider	Team	Time
1	Lilian Calmejane (FRA)	Direct Énergie	5h 27' 27"
2	Julien Simon (FRA)	Cofidis	+ 14"
3	Jetse Bol (NED)	Team Manzana Postobón	+ 14"
4	Jonathan Castroviejo (ESP)	Movistar Team	+ 14"
5	Xandro Meurisse (BEL)	Wanty–Groupe Gobert	+ 14"
6	Arthur Vichot (FRA)	FDJ	+ 14"
7	Oscar Riesebeek (NED)	Roompot–Nederlandse Loterij	+ 43"
8	Wilmar Paredes (COL)	Team Manzana Postobón	+ 43"
9	Mauro Finetto (ITA)	Delko–Marseille Provence KTM	+ 43"
10	Romain Combaud (FRA)	Delko–Marseille Provence KTM	+ 43"

General classification after Stage 3
Rank	Rider	Team	Time
1	Lilian Calmejane (FRA)	Direct Énergie	12h 11' 03"
2	Arthur Vichot (FRA)	FDJ	+ 7"
3	Jonathan Castroviejo (ESP)	Movistar Team	+ 13"
4	Julien Simon (FRA)	Cofidis	+ 24"
5	Daniele Bennati (ITA)	Movistar Team	+ 44"
6	Xandro Meurisse (BEL)	Wanty–Groupe Gobert	+ 45"
7	Jetse Bol (NED)	Team Manzana Postobón	+ 45"
8	Benoît Jarrier (FRA)	Fortuneo–Vital Concept	+ 54"
9	Oscar Riesebeek (NED)	Roompot–Nederlandse Loterij	+ 57"
10	Martijn Tusveld (NED)	Roompot–Nederlandse Loterij	+ 59"

=== Stage 4 ===
7 April 2017 — L'Épau Abbey to Saint-Calais, 186.8 km (116 mi)

Result of Stage 4
Rank	Rider	Team	Time
1	Bryan Coquard (FRA)	Direct Énergie	4h 33' 31"
2	Clément Venturini (FRA)	Cofidis	+ 0"
3	Daniele Bennati (ITA)	Movistar Team	+ 0"
4	Raymond Kreder (NED)	Roompot–Nederlandse Loterij	+ 0"
5	Justin Jules (FRA)	WB Veranclassic Aqua Protect	+ 0"
6	Marco Benfatto (ITA)	Androni–Sidermec–Bottecchia	+ 0"
7	Arthur Vichot (FRA)	FDJ	+ 0"
8	Julien Simon (FRA)	Cofidis	+ 0"
9	Lilian Calmejane (FRA)	Direct Énergie	+ 0"
10	Michel Kreder (NED)	Aqua Blue Sport	+ 0"

Final general classification
Rank	Rider	Team	Time
1	Lilian Calmejane (FRA)	Direct Énergie	16h 44' 34"
2	Arthur Vichot (FRA)	FDJ	+ 3"
3	Jonathan Castroviejo (ESP)	Movistar Team	+ 13"
4	Julien Simon (FRA)	Cofidis	+ 24"
5	Daniele Bennati (ITA)	Movistar Team	+ 40"
6	Xandro Meurisse (BEL)	Wanty–Groupe Gobert	+ 44"
7	Jetse Bol (NED)	Team Manzana Postobón	+ 45"
8	Benoît Jarrier (FRA)	Fortuneo–Vital Concept	+ 54"
9	Oscar Riesebeek (NED)	Roompot–Nederlandse Loterij	+ 57"
10	Martijn Tusveld (NED)	Roompot–Nederlandse Loterij	+ 59"

== Classification leadership table ==
In the 2017 Circuit de la Sarthe, four different jerseys were awarded. The general classification was calculated by adding each cyclist's finishing times on each stage. Time bonuses were awarded to the first three finishers on all stages except for the individual time trial: the stage winner won a ten-second bonus, with six and four seconds for the second and third riders respectively with the exception of Stage 2, where bonuses were six, four and two seconds respectively. Bonus seconds were also awarded to the first three riders at intermediate sprints – three seconds for the winner of the sprint, two seconds for the rider in second and one second for the rider in third. The leader of the general classification received a yellow jersey. This classification was considered the most important of the 2017 Circuit de la Sarthe, and the winner of the classification was considered the winner of the race.

Additionally, there was a points classification, which awarded a green jersey. In the points classification, cyclists received points for finishing in the top placings of a stage. On all mass-start stages; for winning a stage, a rider earned 25 points, with 20 for second, 16 for third, 14 for fourth, 12 for fifth, 10 for sixth with a point fewer per place down to a single point for 15th place. In the individual time trial, points were awarded to the top 10 riders, with 10 points for the winner and a point fewer per place down to a single point for 10th place.

Points for the mountains classification
Position	1	2	3	4	5	6
Points for Category 1	10	8	6	4	2	1
Points for Category 2	6	4	2	1	0	
Points for Category 3	4	2	1	0		

There was also a mountains classification, for which points were awarded for reaching the top of a climb before other riders. Each climb was categorised as either first, second, or third-category, with more points available for the more difficult, higher-categorised climbs. For first-category climbs, the top six riders earned points; on second-category climbs, four riders won points; on third-category climbs, only the top three riders earned points. The leadership of the mountains classification was marked by a pink jersey.

The fourth jersey represented the young rider classification, marked by a blue jersey. Only riders born after 1 January 1994 were eligible; the young rider best placed in the general classification was the leader of the young rider classification. There was also a classification for teams, in which the times of the best three cyclists in a team on each stage were added together; the leading team at the end of the race was the team with the lowest cumulative time.

Stage	Winner	General classification	Points classification	Mountains classification	Young rider classification	Team classification
1	Justin Jules	Justin Jules	Justin Jules	Ángel Madrazo	Andrea Vendrame	WB Veranclassic Aqua Protect
2a	Bryan Coquard	Justin Jules	Justin Jules	Ángel Madrazo	Andrea Vendrame	WB Veranclassic Aqua Protect
2b	Alex Dowsett	Alex Dowsett	Justin Jules	Ángel Madrazo	Andrea Vendrame	Movistar Team
3	Lilian Calmejane	Lilian Calmejane	Lilian Calmejane	Paul Ourselin	Wilmar Paredes	Movistar Team
4	Bryan Coquard	Lilian Calmejane	Bryan Coquard	Ángel Madrazo	Wilmar Paredes	Movistar Team
Final		Lilian Calmejane	Bryan Coquard	Ángel Madrazo	Wilmar Paredes	Movistar Team
