= Benoît Jarrier =

French cyclist

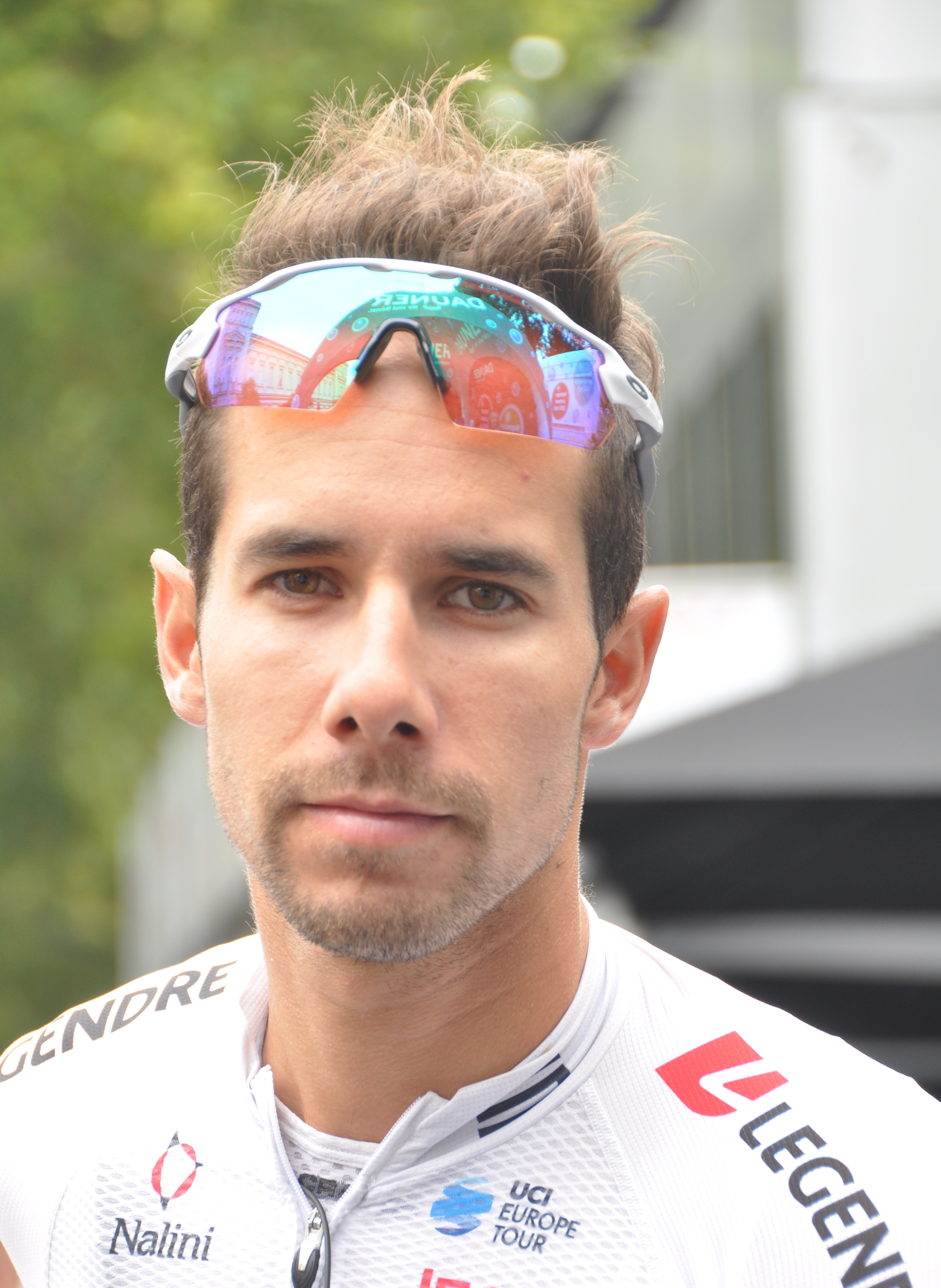
- Jarrier in 2018

Personal information
- Full name: Benoît Jarrier
- Born: 1 February 1989 (age 37) Le Mans, France

Cycling career
- Sport: Cycling
- Current team: Retired
- Discipline: Road
- Role: Rider

Amateur teams
- 2008–2009: Team Wilo Agem 72
- 2011: Véranda Rideau Sarthe

Professional teams
- 2012: Véranda Rideau–Super U
- 2013–2020: Bretagne–Séché Environnement

Benoît Jarrier (born 1 February 1989) is a French former road and cyclo-cross racing cyclist, who rode professionally between 2012 and 2020, for the Véranda Rideau–Super U and Arkéa–Samsic teams. He rode in the 2014 Tour de France.

== Major results ==
2012
2nd Tro-Bro Léon
7th Polynormande
8th Grand Prix de la Somme
9th Châteauroux Classic
2014
2nd Overall Tour de Normandie

1st Stage 6

3rd Route Adélie
4th Overall Étoile de Bessèges
5th Cholet-Pays de Loire
5th Tro-Bro Léon
2015
1st Sprints classification Four Days of Dunkirk
2nd Tro-Bro Léon
9th Duo Normand (with Armindo Fonseca)
2016
7th Overall La Tropicale Amissa Bongo
2017
3rd Grand Prix de la ville de Nogent-sur-Oise
8th Overall Circuit de la Sarthe
9th Overall Tour de Normandie
2018
7th Le Samyn
2019
8th Overall Tour de Bretagne
9th Overall Kreiz Breizh Elites
