= Max Kanter =

German cyclist (born 1997)

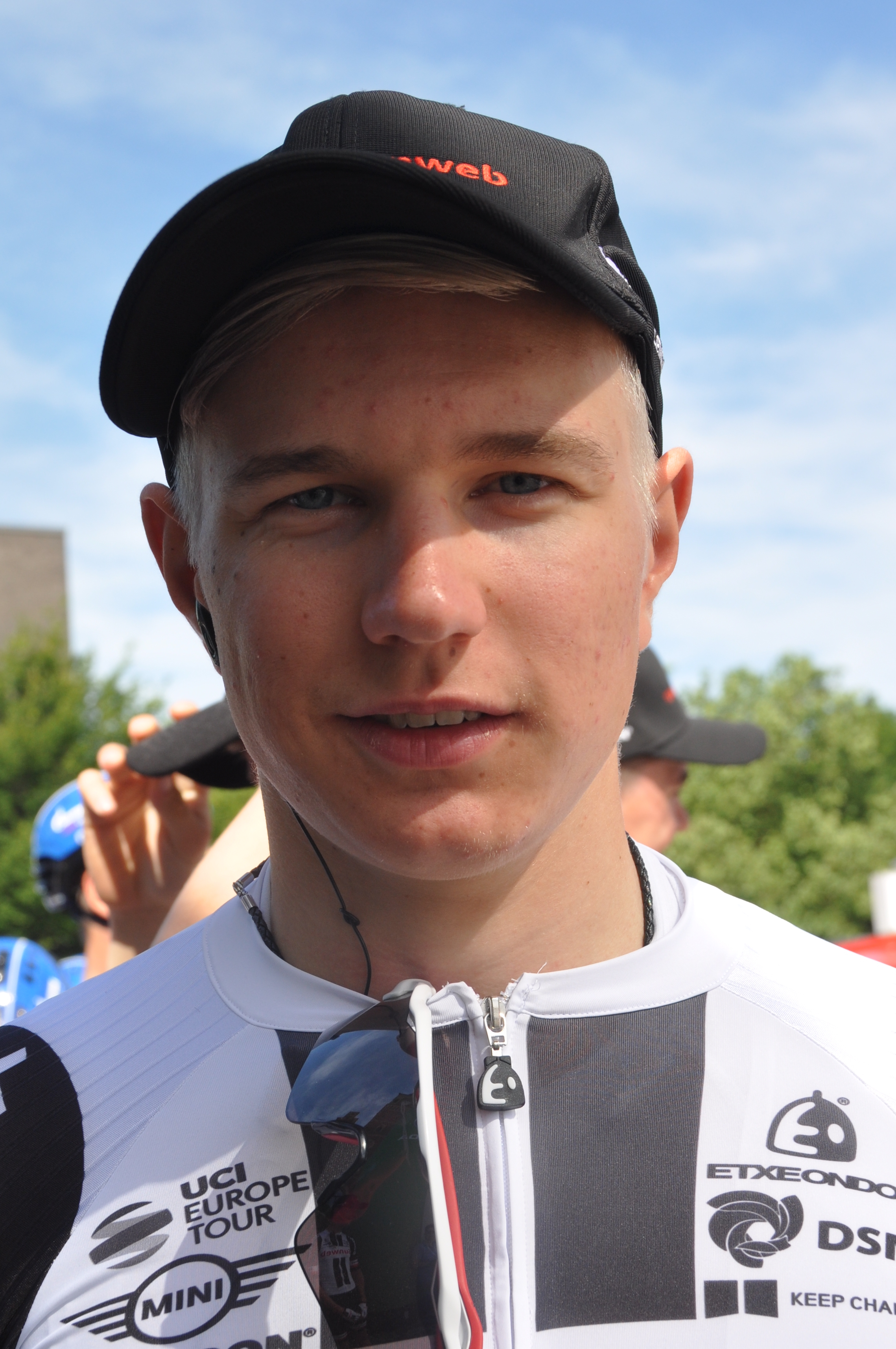
- Kanter in 2017

Personal information
- Full name: Max Kanter
- Born: 22 October 1997 (age 28) Cottbus, Germany
- Height: 1.76 m (5 ft 9 in)
- Weight: 68 kg (150 lb)

Cycling career
- Sport: Cycling
- Current team: XDS Astana Team
- Discipline: Road
- Role: Rider

Amateur team
- 2008–2015: RSC Cottbus

Professional teams
- 2016: LKT Team Brandenburg
- 2016: Team Giant–Alpecin (stagiaire)
- 2017–2018: Development Team Sunweb
- 2017: Team Sunweb (stagiaire)
- 2018: Team Sunweb (stagiaire)
- 2019–2021: Team Sunweb
- 2022–2023: Movistar Team
- 2024–: Astana Qazaqstan Team

Max Kanter (born 22 October 1997 in Cottbus) is a German cyclist, who currently rides for UCI WorldTeam XDS Astana Team.

In October 2020, he was named in the startlist for the 2020 Vuelta a España, which was his first Grand Tour.

== Major results ==
2015
1st Overall Driedaagse van Axel
1st Overall La Coupe du Président de la Ville de Grudziadz
1st Stage 2 Grand Prix Rüebliland
1st Stage 3 Niedersachsen-Rundfahrt der Junioren
3rd Omnium, UCI Juniors Track World Championships
2016
3rd Overall Carpathian Couriers Race

1st Young rider classification

2017
1st Road race, National Under-23 Road Championships
7th Paris–Tours Espoirs
2018
National Under-23 Road Championships

1st Road race
2nd Time trial

Olympia's Tour

1st Points classification
1st Stages 2 & 4

1st Stage 1 Tour de l'Avenir
2nd Ronde van Vlaanderen U23
3rd ZLM Tour
3rd Ronde van Overijssel
4th Overall Boucles de la Mayenne
6th Trofej Umag
8th Ghent–Wevelgem U23
2022
1st Points classification, Route d'Occitanie
3rd Primus Classic
3rd Gooikse Pijl
4th Milano–Torino
9th Hamburg Cyclassics
9th Münsterland Giro
10th Clásica de Almería
10th Omloop van het Houtland
2023
6th Trofeo Ses Salines–Alcúdia
9th Hamburg Cyclassics
2024 (1 pro win)
1st Stage 2 Tour of Turkey
4th Vuelta a Castilla y León
6th Surf Coast Classic
2025 (1)
1st Famenne Ardenne Classic
2nd Clásica de Almería
2nd Omloop van het Houtland
2nd Paris–Chauny
5th Trofeo Palma
6th Classic Brugge–De Panne
6th Trofeo Ses Salines
6th Kampioenschap van Vlaanderen
7th Scheldeprijs
2026 (2)
1st Gooikse Pijl
1st Stage 2 Paris–Nice
2nd Trofeo Palma
2nd Hong Kong Cyclothon
3rd Tour of Bruges
5th Bredene Koksijde Classic

=== Grand Tour general classification results timeline ===
Grand Tour	2020	2021	2022	2023	2024	2025
Giro d'Italia	—	116	—	110	DNF	123
Tour de France	—	—	—	—	—	—
Vuelta a España	112	—	—	—	—	—

Legend
—	Did not compete
DNF	Did not finish
