= 2026 Bredene Koksijde Classic =

2026 UCI ProSeries

Race details
- Dates: 20 March 2026
- Stages: 1
- Distance: 203.4 km (126.4 mi)
- Winning time: 4h 27' 58"

Results
	Winner	Dylan Groenewegen (NED)	(Unibet Rose Rockets)
	Second	Pascal Ackermann (GER)	(Team Jayco–AlUla)
	Third	Pavel Bittner (CZE)	(Team Picnic–PostNL)

The 2026 Bredene Koksijde Classic was the 23rd edition of the Bredene Koksijde Classic road cycling one day race, which was held on 20 March 2026, starting and finishing in the titular towns of Bredene and Koksijde, respectively.

== Teams ==
Eleven UCI WorldTeams, eight UCI ProTeams, and three UCI Continental teams made up the twenty-two teams that participated in the race.

UCI WorldTeams

- Alpecin–Premier Tech
- Groupama–FDJ United
- Lidl–Trek
- Lotto–Intermarché
- NSN Cycling Team
- Soudal–Quick-Step
- Team Jayco–AlUla
- Team Picnic–PostNL
- UAE Team Emirates XRG
- Uno-X Mobility
- XDS Astana Team

UCI ProTeams

- Caja Rural–Seguros RGA
- Cofidis
- Modern Adventure Pro Cycling
- Pinarello–Q36.5 Pro Cycling Team
- Team Flanders–Baloise
- Team TotalEnergies
- Tudor Pro Cycling Team
- Unibet Rose Rockets

UCI Continental Teams

- BEAT CC p/b Saxo
- Tarteletto–Isorex
- VolkerWessels Cycling Team

== Result ==
Result (1–10)
Rank	Rider	Team	Time
1	Dylan Groenewegen (NED)	Unibet Rose Rockets	4h 27' 58"
2	Pascal Ackermann (GER)	Team Jayco–AlUla	+ 0"
3	Pavel Bittner (CZE)	Team Picnic–PostNL	+ 0"
4	Steffen De Schuyteneer (BEL)	Lotto–Intermarché	+ 0"
5	Max Kanter (GER)	XDS Astana Team	+ 0"
6	Stanisław Aniołkowski (POL)	Cofidis	+ 0"
7	Luca Mozzato (ITA)	Tudor Pro Cycling Team	+ 0"
8	Alexis Renard (FRA)	Cofidis	+ 0"
9	Jason Tesson (FRA)	Team TotalEnergies	+ 0"
10	Gerben Thijssen (BEL)	Alpecin–Premier Tech	+ 0"
