= 2019 Three Days of Bruges–De Panne =

Cycling race

2019 UCI World Tour, race 10 of 38

Race details
- Dates: 27 March 2019
- Stages: 1
- Distance: 200.3 km (124.5 mi)
- Winning time: 4h 36' 32"

Results
| | Winner | Dylan Groenewegen (NED) | (Team Jumbo–Visma) |
| | Second | Fernando Gaviria (COL) | (UAE Team Emirates) |
| | Third | Elia Viviani (ITA) | (Deceuninck–Quick-Step) |

The 2019 Three Days of Bruges–De Panne was a road cycling one-day race that took place on 27 March 2019 in Belgium. It was the 43rd edition of the Three Days of Bruges–De Panne and the tenth event of the 2019 UCI World Tour. It was won in the sprint by Dylan Groenewegen.

== Result ==
Result
| Rank | Rider | Team | Time |
|---|---|---|---|
| 1 | Dylan Groenewegen (NED) | Team Jumbo–Visma | 4h 36' 32" |
| 2 | Fernando Gaviria (COL) | UAE Team Emirates | + 0" |
| 3 | Elia Viviani (ITA) | Deceuninck–Quick-Step | + 0" |
| 4 | Nacer Bouhanni (FRA) | Cofidis | + 0" |
| 5 | Justin Jules (FRA) | Wallonie Bruxelles | + 0" |
| 6 | Kristoffer Halvorsen (NOR) | Team Sky | + 0" |
| 7 | Jonas Van Genechten (BEL) | Vital Concept–B&B Hotels | + 0" |
| 8 | Luka Mezgec (SLO) | Mitchelton–Scott | + 0" |
| 9 | Giacomo Nizzolo (ITA) | Team Dimension Data | + 0" |
| 10 | Mike Teunissen (NED) | Team Jumbo–Visma | + 0" |
