= Dylan Groenewegen =

Dutch cyclist (born 1993)

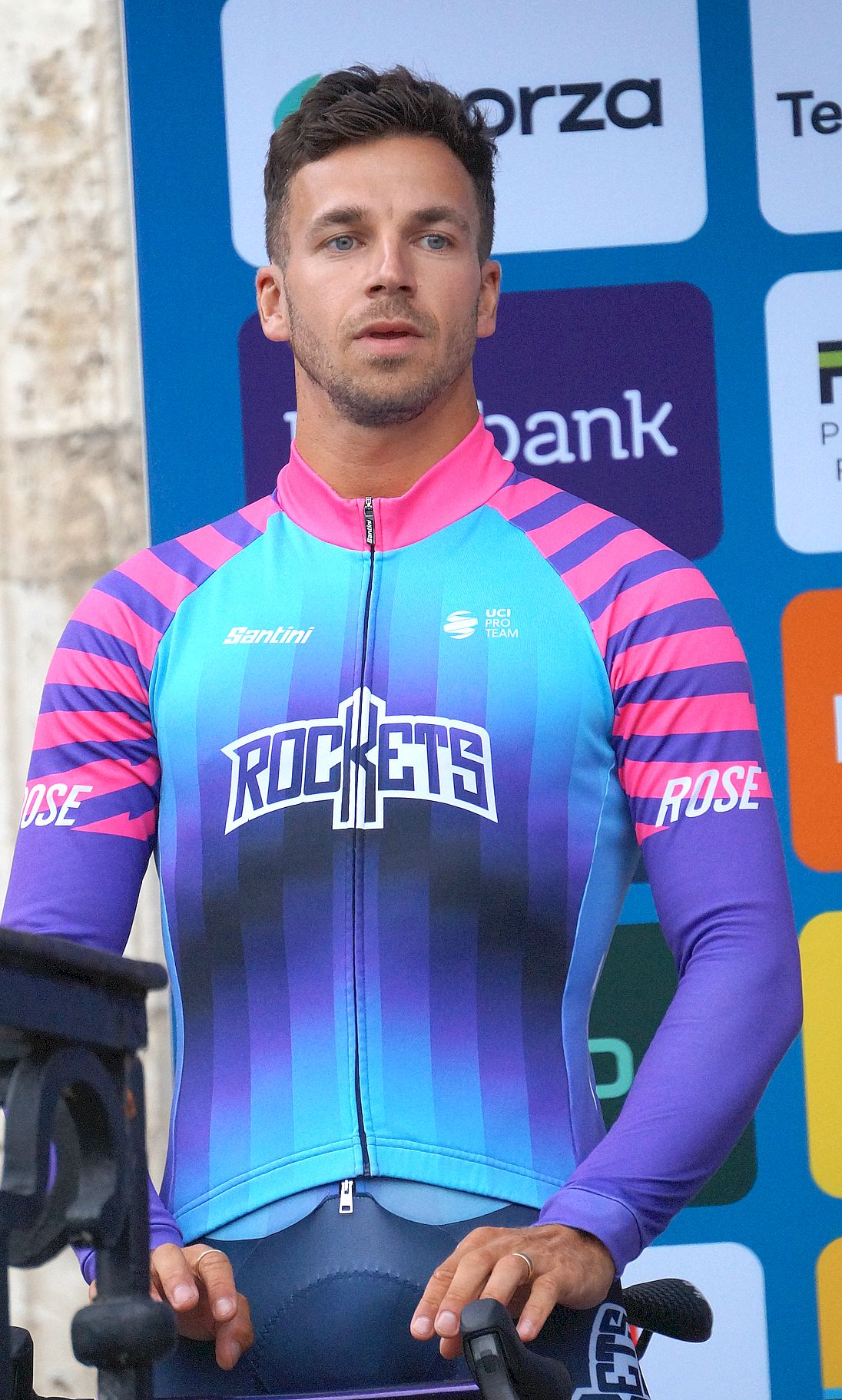
- Groenewegen in 2026

Personal information
- Full name: Dylan Groenewegen
- Nickname: The Batman
- Born: 21 June 1993 (age 33) Amsterdam, Netherlands
- Height: 1.77 m (5 ft 9 1/2 in)
- Weight: 70 kg (154 lb; 11 st 0 lb)

Cycling career
- Sport: Cycling
- Current team: Unibet Rose Rockets
- Discipline: Road
- Role: Rider
- Rider type: Sprinter

Professional teams
- 2012–2014: Cycling Team De Rijke
- 2015: Team Roompot
- 2016–2021: LottoNL–Jumbo
- 2022–2025: Team BikeExchange–Jayco
- 2026–: Unibet Rose Rockets

Major wins
- Grand Tours Tour de France 6 individual stages (2017, 2018, 2019, 2022, 2024) 1 TTT stage (2019) One-day races and Classics National Road Race Championships (2016, 2024) Tour of Bruges (2019, 2026) Kuurne–Brussels–Kuurne (2018) Bredene Koksijde Classic (2026) Brussels Cycling Classic (2015) Rund um Köln (2016)

Dylan Groenewegen (Dutch pronunciation: [ˈdɪlə(ŋ) ˈɣrunəˌʋeːɣə(n)]; born 21 June 1993) is a Dutch professional road racing cyclist, who rides for UCI Pro team Unibet Rose Rockets. He has won six individual Tour de France stages and one team time trial stage. He has also won the Dutch National Road Race Championships, five stages of the Tour of Norway, five stages of the Tour of Britain and three stages of Paris–Nice. In 2020, Groenewegen received considerable attention for causing a serious crash at the Tour de Pologne, which put Fabio Jakobsen in hospital, and for which Groenewegen received a nine-month ban from racing.

== Early life ==
Groenewegen was born to a working-class family in Amsterdam. His grandfather, Ko Zieleman (1933–2021), assembled custom bike frames of which Groenewegen received his first bike at the age of seven. Zieleman owned a shop selling bike frames, a trade that his father had started in 1928, which Groenewegen's father, Gerrie, has continued. At the age of 17, Groenewegen went to a trade school in order to follow his previous three generations as a frame-builder.

== Career ==
=== Pre-World Tour ===
Groenewegen said in an interview that he had to choose between Team Roompot or BMC Racing Team to join in 2014. He chose the former as they gave him "a lot of confidence".

=== LottoNL–Jumbo (2016–2021) ===
In October 2015, Groenewegen announced that he had signed with LottoNL–Jumbo, on an initial three-year deal from 2016.

==== 2016 ====
In June, Groenewegen won the Dutch National Road Race Championships after outsprinting Wouter Wippert. During a review of Groenewegen's Bianchi Oltre XR4 bicycle, Simon Richardson of Global Cycling Network said he is "a very easy rider to work with" in respect to the mechanics. Groenewegen won stage 4 of the Tour of Britain.

==== 2017 ====
In the Dubai Tour, which ran from late January into early February, Groenewegen came second in the general classification, having finished second in stages 1 and 2. Despite narrowly missing out on victory in these areas, he did win the overall youth classification. On 28 April, Groenewegen won the first stage of the Tour de Yorkshire. The stage, which was 174 kilometres (108 mi) long from Bridlington to Scarbrough, came down to a photo finish where he held off Australian sprinter Caleb Ewan. He came fourth on the second stage which finished in Harrogate. He continued this success when in May, he won two stages at the Tour of Norway.

The Tour de France started well for Groenewegen when he came fifth on stage 2, the first flat stage. (Note: Stage 1 was an individual time trial.) He produced two more top-10 results in the first week, with sixth in stages 6 and 7. After two mountain stages and a rest day in Dordogne, he returned to finish third on stage 10 – a 178-kilometre (111 mi) route from Périgueux to Bergerac. Groenewegen won the final stage of the race on the last stage on the Champs-Élysées in Paris.

==== 2018 ====
In February, Groenewegen competed in the Dubai Tour and won stage 1. Groenewegen held the general classification lead until the third stage when he was penalised 20 seconds after illegally drafting behind his team's car after suffering a mechanical fault. The blue jersey, given to the race leader, was lost to Elia Viviani who started the day two seconds behind Groenewegen, who dropped out of the top 10. He expressed his anger, saying "I had problems with my bike, the mechanicals fucked it up for me. I actually think it was a good decision by the judges but it fucked it up for me" before placing the blame on his mechanics, saying that "it's the fault of my mechanics".

In the Tour de France, Groenewegen won stage 7 after beating Fernando Gaviria and Peter Sagan, both of whom had won two stages to that point in the tour. The stage was the longest in the tour at 231 km (143.5 mi) which started in Fougères and finished in Chartres, Northern France. Groenewegen also won stage 8, beating Sagan and John Degenkolb in Amiens. In an interview, Groenewegen said that the sprint was "a bit messy" but he said that he "surged ahead" and took advantage of the "good opportunity".

==== 2019 ====
In March, Groenewegen won the first two stages of Paris–Nice. On the second stage, he found himself at the head of the race in a group of 23 riders about 30 km (18.6 mi) from the finish line, and ended up winning the stage after another split left just 7 riders contesting for the win. Later in March, he won the Three Days of Bruges–De Panne, out sprinting Gaviria and Viviani after squeezing through a gap between Gaviria and the barrier in order to open up his sprint.

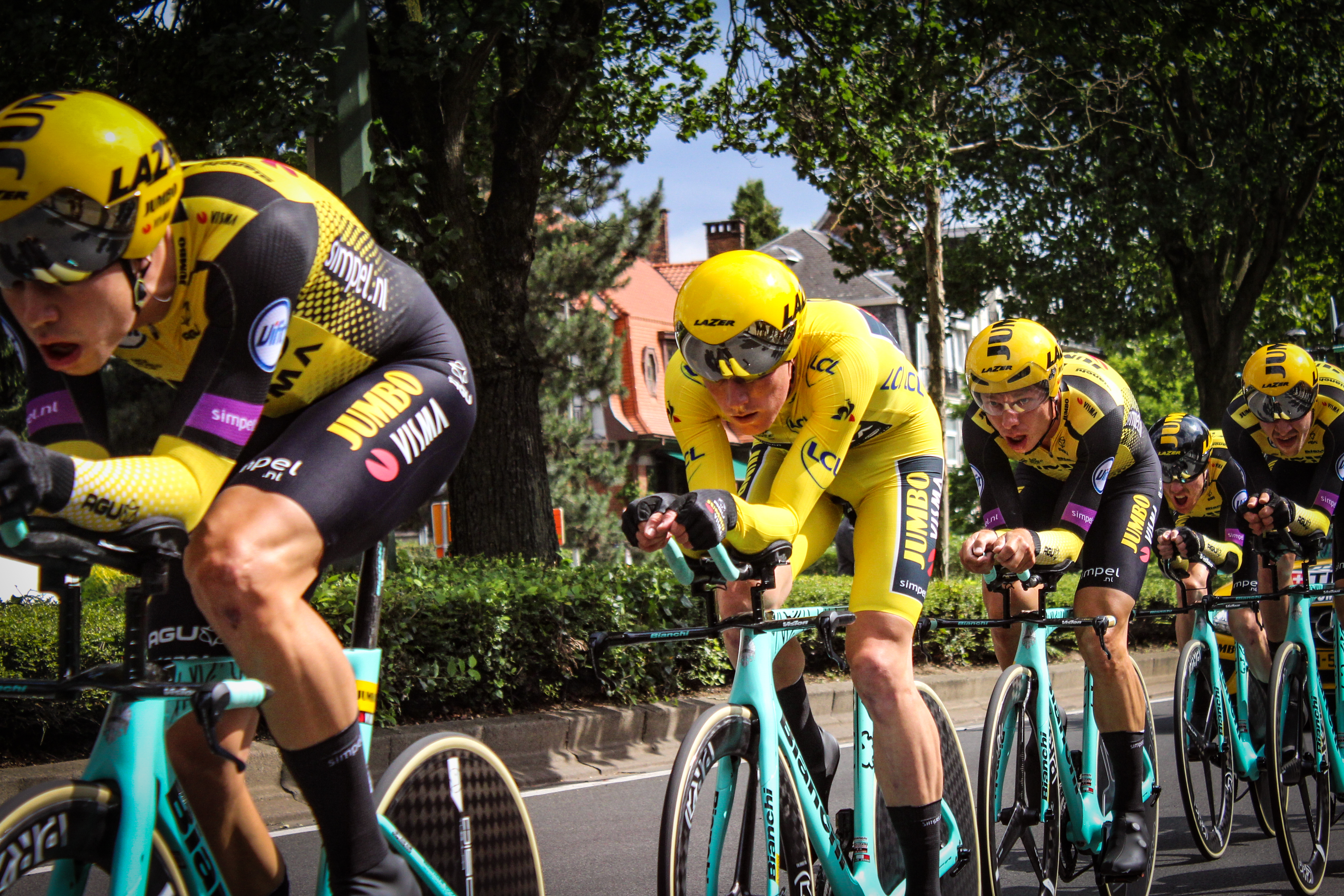
Team Jumbo-Visma on their way to winning stage 2 of the Tour de France

Team Jumbo-Visma won the team time trial on stage 2 of the Tour de France, thus increasing the lead of Groenewegen's teammate, Mike Teunissen in the general classification. Groenwegen went on to win stage 7 of the Tour de France, the longest stage in the tour at 230 km (142.9 mi) finishing in Chalon-sur-Saône. He beat Caleb Ewan and Sagan, giving him his fourth Tour de France stage win. Groenewegen won stages 1, 3 and 5 of the Tour of Britain, beating Davide Cimolai, Mathieu van der Poel, and Matthew Walls on the respective stages.

==== 2020 ====
Groenewegen's 2020 season started well, with victories on stages 1 and 3 as well as the points classification of the Volta a la Comunitat Valenciana. Groenewegen had further success in the UAE Tour, winning stage 4 on 26 February. He beat Fernando Gaviria and Pascal Ackermann to the finish in Dubai after 173 km.

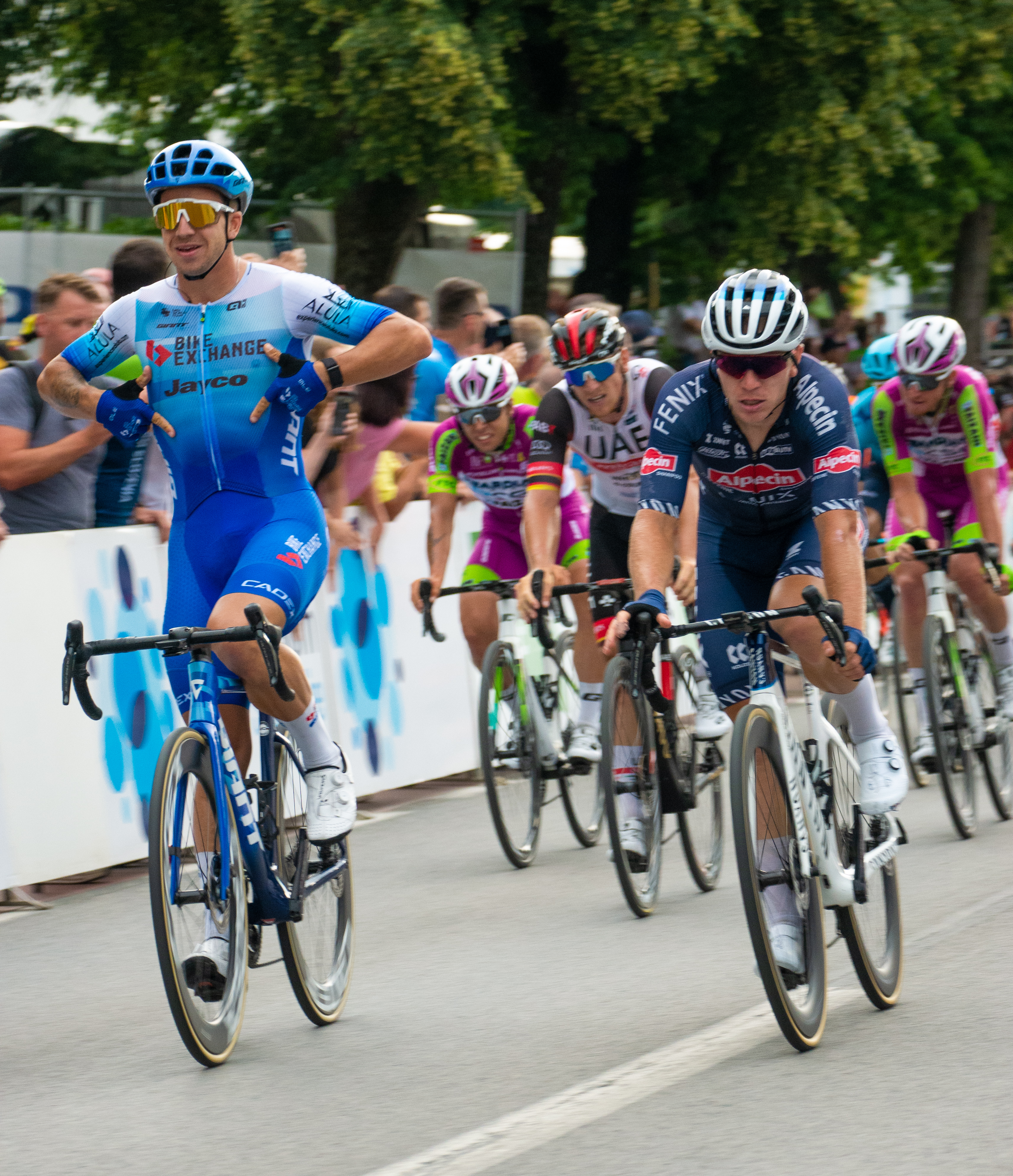
Groenewegen celebrating a win on Stage 2, 2022 Tour of Slovenia

During stage 1 of the Tour de Pologne in Katowice, Poland, on 5 August, Groenewegen pushed Fabio Jakobsen into the barriers surrounding the finish line causing a very serious crash that put his rival in hospital and eventually in a medically induced coma. Groenewegen crashed as well and suffered a broken collarbone. More riders were involved in the crash; French sprinter Marc Sarreau had to abandon the race due to his injuries resulting from the crash. Groenewegen was disqualified from the race and fined CHF 500. Jakobsen's directeur sportif Patrick Lefevere said at the time that his team were considering bringing criminal charges against Groenewegen.

In November 2020, Groenewegen was handed a nine-month ban for causing the crash, backdated to the day of the incident, meaning the ban ended on 7 May 2021. The previous month, Jakobsen had to undergo facial surgery where his jaw was reconstructed and bone was transplanted. Both Groenewegen and his team Jumbo-Visma apologized and took responsibility, with Groenewegen saying he "deviated from [his] line" and also that he wanted to be a "fair sprinter".

=== Team BikeExchange–Jayco (2022–2025) ===
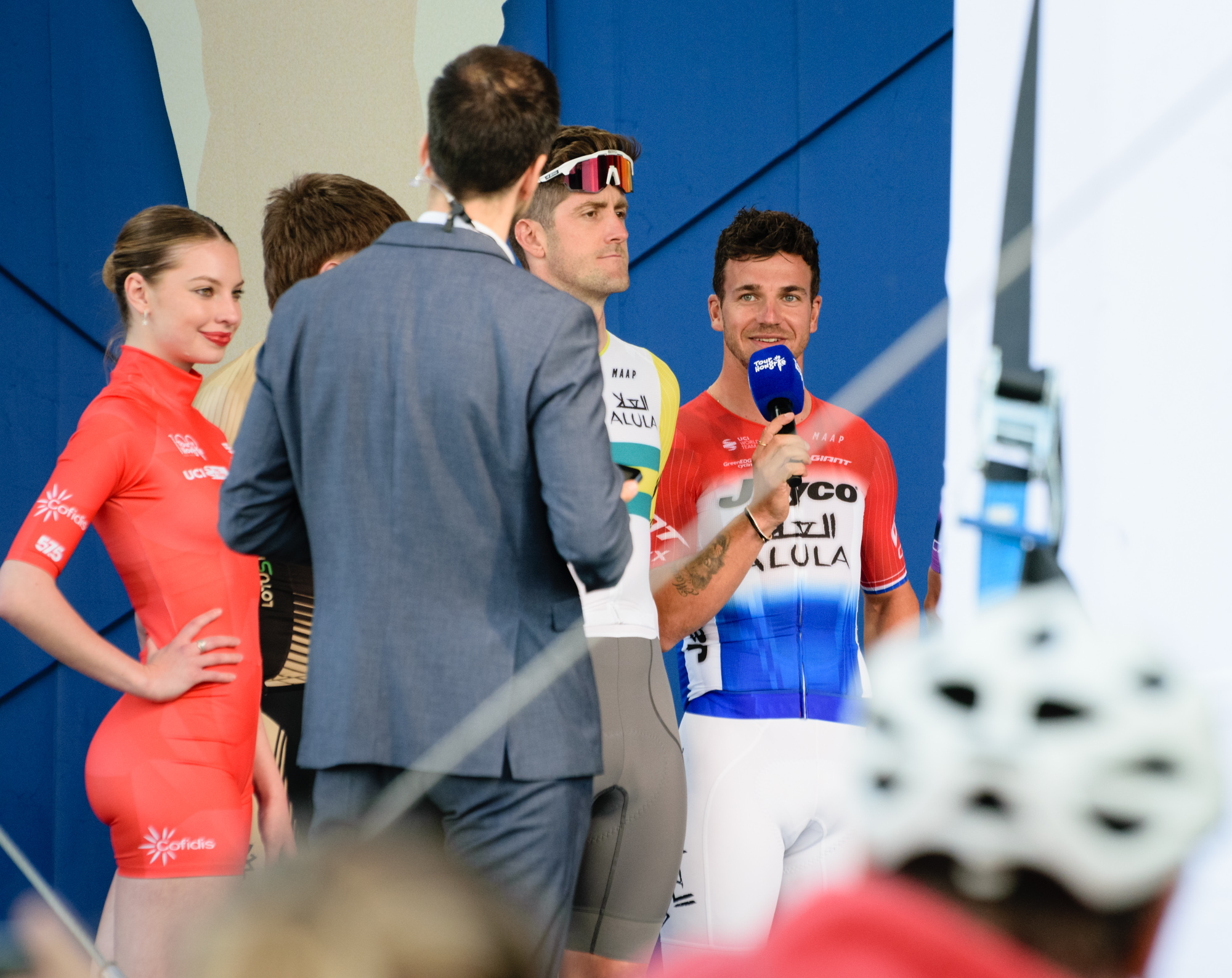
Groenewegen during the Team Jayco–AlUla team presentation of the 2025 Tour de Hongrie

In December 2021, Groenewegen signed a three-year contract with Australian UCI WorldTeam Team BikeExchange–Jayco from 2022 season. Early in the season he won stages in several smaller races including the Tour de Hongrie, the Tour of Slovenia as well as the 2022 Saudi Tour where he won two stages and the points classification. In the 2022 Tour de France he won stage 3, his first victory at the Tour since 2019. Groenewegen won stage 6 of the 2024 Tour de France in a photo finish after a mass sprint.

During stage 5 of the 2025 UAE Tour, Groenewegen crashed hard, and later had to abandon the race, due to sustaining a concussion.

=== Unibet Rose Rockets (2026–) ===
In August 2025, Groenewegen was announced as a new addition to the UCI ProTeam Unibet Rose Rockets on a two-year deal starting in 2026.

Groenewegen won his first race for his new team in January 2026, when he won Clàssica Comunitat Valenciana in front of Paul Magnier.

== Personal life ==
As of 2017, Groenewegen lives in Rivierenbuurt, a district in Amsterdam.

== Major results ==
2011
1st Stage 1 Driedaagse van Axel
1st Stage 3 Liège–La Gleize
2nd Road race, National Junior Road Championships
2nd Kuurne–Brussels–Kuurne Juniores
2012
3rd Münsterland Giro
4th Nationale Sluitingsprijs
9th Dutch Food Valley Classic
9th Omloop van het Houtland
2013
1st Kernen Omloop Echt-Susteren
1st Ronde van Noord-Holland
2nd Ronde van Vlaanderen Beloften
4th Dorpenomloop Rucphen
5th Overall Olympia's Tour
6th Nationale Sluitingsprijs
8th Zuid Oost Drenthe Classic I
9th Antwerpse Havenpijl
2014
1st Ronde van Vlaanderen Beloften
1st Stage 2 Tour de Normandie
3rd Trofeo Palma
3rd Zuid Oost Drenthe Classic I
10th Ronde van Overijssel
10th Gooikse Pijl
2015 (2 pro wins)
1st Arnhem–Veenendaal Classic
1st Brussels Cycling Classic
4th Road race, National Road Championships
5th Handzame Classic
7th Grote Prijs Stad Zottegem
2016 (11)
1st Road race, National Road Championships
1st Rund um Köln
1st Heistse Pijl
1st Tour de l'Eurométropole
1st Arnhem–Veenendaal Classic
Tour de Yorkshire

1st Points classification
1st Stage 1

Ster ZLM Toer

1st Points classification
1st Stage 3

Tour of Britain

1st Points classification
1st Stage 4

1st Stage 1 Eneco Tour
1st Stage 1 Driedaagse van West-Vlaanderen
1st Stage 3 Volta a la Comunitat Valenciana
2nd Handzame Classic
3rd Ronde van Drenthe
3rd Nokere Koerse
4th Kuurne–Brussels–Kuurne
6th EuroEyes Cyclassics
6th Le Samyn
9th Scheldeprijs
2017 (8)
Ster ZLM Toer

1st Points classification
1st Stages 2 & 3

Tour of Norway

1st Stages 2 & 4

1st Stage 21 Tour de France
1st Stage 5 Tour of Guangxi
1st Stage 1 Tour de Yorkshire
1st Stage 7 Tour of Britain
2nd Overall Dubai Tour

1st Young rider classification

2nd Kampioenschap van Vlaanderen
3rd Road race, National Road Championships
3rd EuroEyes Cyclassics
3rd Tacx Pro Classic
5th Dwars door Vlaanderen
5th Münsterland Giro
2018 (14)
1st Kampioenschap van Vlaanderen
1st Kuurne–Brussels–Kuurne
1st Arnhem–Veenendaal Classic
Tour of Norway

1st Stages 1, 3 & 4

Tour de France

1st Stages 7 & 8

Volta ao Algarve

1st Stages 1 & 4

1st Stage 2 Paris–Nice
1st Stage 1 Tour of Guangxi
1st Stage 1 Dubai Tour
1st Stage 2 Tour of Slovenia
7th Gooikse Pijl
2019 (15)
1st Three Days of Bruges–De Panne
1st Tacx Pro Classic
Four Days of Dunkirk

1st Stages 1, 2 & 3

Tour of Britain

1st Stages 1, 3 & 5

Tour de France

1st Stages 2 (TTT) & 7

Paris–Nice

1st Stages 1 & 2

1st Stage 4 Volta ao Algarve
1st Stage 5 Volta a la Comunitat Valenciana
3rd Kampioenschap van Vlaanderen
4th Kuurne–Brussels–Kuurne
4th Primus Classic
7th Overall ZLM Tour

1st Points classification
1st Stages 1 & 2

2020 (3)
Volta a la Comunitat Valenciana

1st Points classification
1st Stages 1 & 3

1st Stage 4 UAE Tour
2021 (3)
Tour de Wallonie

1st Points classification
1st Stages 1 & 4

1st Stage 1 Danmark Rundt
2nd Kampioenschap van Vlaanderen
3rd Ronde van Drenthe
9th Binche–Chimay–Binche
10th Elfstedenronde
2022 (7)
1st Veenendaal–Veenendaal Classic
Saudi Tour

1st Points classification
1st Stages 3 & 5

1st Stage 3 Tour de France
1st Stage 2 Tour of Slovenia
1st Stage 2 Arctic Race of Norway
1st Stage 4 Tour de Hongrie
2nd Classic Brugge–De Panne
2nd Grand Prix de Fourmies
2nd Paris–Chauny
3rd Kampioenschap van Vlaanderen
3rd Omloop van het Houtland
3rd Memorial Rik Van Steenbergen
4th Rund um Köln
5th Gooikse Pijl
7th Münsterland Giro
2023 (6)
1st Veenendaal–Veenendaal Classic
Tour of Slovenia

1st Stages 1 & 2

Saudi Tour

1st Points classification
1st Stage 1

1st Stage 5 UAE Tour
1st Stage 1 Tour de Hongrie
2nd Kampioenschap van Vlaanderen
2nd Omloop van het Houtland
3rd Gooikse Pijl
4th Scheldeprijs
10th Milano–Torino
2024 (5)
1st Road race, National Road Championships
1st Ronde van Limburg
1st Clàssica Comunitat Valenciana 1969
1st Stage 6 Tour de France
1st Stage 1 Tour of Slovenia
2nd Bredene Koksijde Classic
2nd Omloop van het Houtland
3rd Scheldeprijs
3rd Veenendaal–Veenendaal
4th Gooikse Pijl
8th Kampioenschap van Vlaanderen
9th Gent–Wevelgem
2025 (3)
Tour of Slovenia

1st Stages 1 & 3

1st Stage 4 Tour de Hongrie
2nd Kampioenschap van Vlaanderen
2nd Gooikse Pijl
3rd Road race, National Road Championships
5th Grand Prix de Fourmies
7th Copenhagen Sprint
9th Classic Brugge–De Panne
2026 (4)
1st Tour of Bruges
1st Bredene Koksijde Classic
1st Clàssica Comunitat Valenciana 1969
1st Grote Prijs Jean-Pierre Monseré
2nd Kampioenschap van Vlaanderen
3rd Clásica de Almería
7th Trofeo Palma

=== Grand Tour general classification results timeline ===
Grand Tour	2016	2017	2018	2019	2020	2021	2022	2023	2024	2025	2026
Giro d'Italia	—	—	—	—	—	DNF	—	—	—	—	
Tour de France	160	156	DNF	145	—	—	117	137	135	150	—
Vuelta a España	—	—	—	—	—	—	—	—	—	—	—

=== Classics results timeline ===
Monument	2015	2016	2017	2018	2019	2020	2021	2022	2023	2024	2025	2026
Milan–San Remo	—	—	—	—	78	—	—	—	—	—	—	—
Tour of Flanders	DNF	—	—	—	—	—	—	—	—	—	—	
Paris–Roubaix	—	—	47	44	—	NH	81	—	—	—	—	
Liège–Bastogne–Liège	Has not contested during career											
Giro di Lombardia	Has not contested during career											
Classic	2015	2016	2017	2018	2019	2020	2021	2022	2023	2024	2025	2026
Omloop Het Nieuwsblad	—	—	25	—	—	—	—	—	—	—	—	—
Kuurne–Brussels–Kuurne	DNF	4	18	1	4	—	—	—	—	—	—	108
Milano–Torino	—	—	—	—	—	—	—	—	10	—	—	—
Tour of Bruges	Previously a stage race			—	1	—	—	2	13	24	9	1
Gent–Wevelgem	DSQ	—	80	93	—	—	—	DNF	44	9	—	
Dwars door Vlaanderen	32	58	5	81	—	NH	—	107	—	—	—	
Scheldeprijs	119	9	58	DSQ	—	—	—	DNF	4	3	12	
Cyclassics Hamburg	—	6	3	—	—	Not held		46	17	—	—	
Paris–Tours	—	—	19	80	—	—	—	—	—	—	—	

=== Major championships results timeline ===
Event		2015	2016	2017	2018	2019	2020	2021	2022	2023	2024	2025	2026
World Championships	Road race	—	37	—	—	—	—	—	—	—	—	—	
National Championships	Road race	4	1	3	31	—	—	11	—	—	1	3	

Legend
—	Did not compete
DNF	Did not finish
DSQ	Disqualified
NH	Not held
IP	In progress

== Notes ==
Sporting positions
Preceded by Niki Terpstra	Dutch National Road Race; Champion; 2016	Succeeded by Ramon Sinkeldam
