= 2025 Classic Brugge–De Panne =

Cycling race

2025 UCI World Tour, race 10 of 36

Race details
- Dates: 26 March 2025
- Stages: 1
- Distance: 195.6 km (121.5 mi)
- Winning time: 4h 07' 23"

Results
	Winner	Juan Sebastián Molano (COL)	(UAE Team Emirates XRG)
	Second	Jonathan Milan (ITA)	(Lidl–Trek)
	Third	Madis Mihkels (EST)	(EF Education–EasyPost)

The 2025 Classic Brugge–De Panne was a road cycling one-day race that took place on 26 March 2025 in Belgium. It was the 49th edition of the Three Days of Bruges–De Panne.

== Teams ==
Twenty-four teams were invited to the race, including sixteen UCI WorldTeams and eight UCI ProTeams.

UCI WorldTeams

- Alpecin–Deceuninck
- Arkéa–B&B Hotels
- Cofidis
- EF Education–EasyPost
- Groupama–FDJ
- Intermarché–Wanty
- Lidl–Trek
- Movistar Team
- Red Bull–Bora–Hansgrohe
- Soudal–Quick-Step
- Team Bahrain Victorious
- Team Jayco–AlUla
- Team Picnic–PostNL
- UAE Team Emirates XRG
- Visma–Lease a Bike
- XDS Astana Team

UCI ProTeams

- Israel–Premier Tech
- Lotto
- Team Flanders–Baloise
- Team TotalEnergies
- Tudor Pro Cycling Team
- Unibet Tietema Rockets
- Uno-X Mobility
- Wagner Bazin WB

== Result ==
Result (1–10)
Rank	Rider	Team	Time
1	Juan Sebastián Molano (COL)	UAE Team Emirates XRG	4h 07' 23"
2	Jonathan Milan (ITA)	Lidl–Trek	+ 0"
3	Madis Mihkels (EST)	EF Education–EasyPost	+ 0"
4	Phil Bauhaus (GER)	Team Bahrain Victorious	+ 0"
5	Erlend Blikra (NOR)	Uno-X Mobility	+ 0"
6	Max Kanter (GER)	XDS Astana Team	+ 0"
7	Alexis Renard (FRA)	Cofidis	+ 0"
8	Laurenz Rex (BEL)	Intermarché–Wanty	+ 0"
9	Dylan Groenewegen (NED)	Team Jayco–AlUla	+ 0"
10	Sam Welsford (AUS)	Red Bull–Bora–Hansgrohe	+ 0"
