= 2026 Tour of Bruges =

Cycling race

2026 UCI World Tour, race 10 of 36

Race details
- Dates: 25 March 2026
- Stages: 1
- Distance: 202.9 km (126.1 mi)
- Winning time: 4h 15' 57"

Results
	Winner	Dylan Groenewegen (NED)	(Unibet Rose Rockets)
	Second	Jasper Philipsen (BEL)	(Alpecin–Premier Tech)
	Third	Max Kanter (GER)	(XDS Astana Team)

The 2026 Tour of Bruges was a road cycling one-day race that took place on 25 March in Belgium. It was the 50th edition of the Tour of Bruges, previously known as the Classic Brugge–De Panne.

The race was won by Dutch rider Dylan Groenewegen of Unibet Rose Rockets in a sprint finish, the first UCI World Tour race win for Unibet Rose Rockets.

== Teams ==
Twenty-two teams participated in the race, including sixteen UCI WorldTeams and six UCI ProTeams.

UCI WorldTeams

- Alpecin–Premier Tech
- Decathlon CMA CGM
- EF Education–EasyPost
- Groupama–FDJ United
- INEOS Grenadiers
- Lidl–Trek
- Lotto–Intermarché
- Movistar Team
- NSN Cycling Team
- Soudal–Quick-Step
- Team Bahrain Victorious
- Team Jayco–AlUla
- Team Picnic–PostNL
- UAE Team Emirates XRG
- Uno-X Mobility
- XDS Astana Team

UCI ProTeams

- Burgos Burpellet BH
- Cofidis
- Team Flanders–Baloise
- Team TotalEnergies
- Tudor Pro Cycling Team
- Unibet Rose Rockets

== Result ==
Result (1–10)
Rank	Rider	Team	Time
1	Dylan Groenewegen (NED)	Unibet Rose Rockets	4h 15' 57"
2	Jasper Philipsen (BEL)	Alpecin–Premier Tech	+ 0"
3	Max Kanter (GER)	XDS Astana Team	+ 0"
4	Stanisław Aniołkowski (POL)	Cofidis	+ 0"
5	Luca Mozzato (ITA)	Tudor Pro Cycling Team	+ 0"
6	Pavel Bittner (CZE)	Team Picnic–PostNL	+ 0"
7	Iván García Cortina (ESP)	Movistar Team	+ 0"
8	Laurenz Rex (BEL)	Soudal–Quick-Step	+ 0"
9	Luke Lamperti (USA)	EF Education–EasyPost	+ 0"
10	Steffen De Schuyteneer (BEL)	Lotto–Intermarché	+ 0"
