= 2018 Kuurne–Brussels–Kuurne =

- Previous winner Peter Sagan portrayed on the official poster

Race details
- Dates: 25 February 2018
- Stages: 1
- Distance: 200.1 km (124.3 mi)
- Winning time: 4h 51' 41"

Results
	Winner	Dylan Groenewegen (NED)	(LottoNL–Jumbo)
	Second	Arnaud Démare (FRA)	(Groupama–FDJ)
	Third	Sonny Colbrelli (ITA)	(Bahrain–Merida)

The 70th edition of the Kuurne–Brussels–Kuurne cycling classic was held on 25 February 2018. It was part of the 2018 UCI Europe Tour and ranked as a 1.HC event. The route was 200.1 km (124 mi), starting and finishing in Kuurne. It was the second and concluding race of the Belgian opening weekend, the year's first road races in Northwestern Europe, one day after Omloop Het Nieuwsblad.

The race was won by Dylan Groenewegen of LottoNL–Jumbo in a sprint, followed by Arnaud Démare in second and Sonny Colbrelli finishing in third.

== Teams ==
Twenty-five teams were invited to start the race. These included sixteen UCI WorldTeams and nine UCI Professional Continental teams.

UCI WorldTeams

- AG2R La Mondiale
- Astana
- Bora–Hansgrohe
- Bahrain–Merida
- BMC Racing Team
- Team Dimension Data
- EF Education First–Drapac p/b Cannondale
- Team Katusha–Alpecin
- Lotto–Soudal
- LottoNL–Jumbo
- Mitchelton–Scott
- Quick-Step Floors
- Team Sky
- Trek–Segafredo
- UAE Team Emirates
- Groupama–FDJ

UCI Professional Continental teams

- Cofidis
- Direct Énergie
- Israel Cycling Academy
- Roompot–Nederlandse Loterij
- Sport Vlaanderen–Baloise
- Vérandas Willems–Crelan
- Wanty–Groupe Gobert
- WB Aqua Protect Veranclassic
- Fortuneo–Vital Concept

== Results ==
Result
Rank	Rider	Team	Time
1	Dylan Groenewegen (NED)	LottoNL–Jumbo	4h 51' 41"
2	Arnaud Démare (FRA)	Groupama–FDJ	+ 0"
3	Sonny Colbrelli (ITA)	Bahrain–Merida	+ 0"
4	Pim Ligthart (NED)	Roompot–Nederlandse Loterij	+ 0"
5	Justin Jules (FRA)	WB Aqua Protect Veranclassic	+ 0"
6	Jempy Drucker (LUX)	BMC Racing Team	+ 0"
7	Guillaume Boivin (CAN)	Israel Cycling Academy	+ 0"
8	Łukasz Wiśniowski (POL)	Team Sky	+ 0"
9	Julien Vermote (BEL)	Team Dimension Data	+ 0"
10	Timothy Dupont (BEL)	Wanty–Groupe Gobert	+ 0"
