= 2025 Grand Prix de Fourmies =

2025 UCI ProSeries

Race details
- Dates: 14 September 2025
- Stages: 1
- Distance: 193 km (119.9 mi)
- Winning time: 4h 18' 27"

Results
	Winner	Paul Magnier (FRA)	(Soudal–Quick-Step)
	Second	Pavel Bittner (CZE)	(Team Picnic–PostNL)
	Third	Yevgeniy Fedorov (KAZ)	(XDS Astana Team)

The 2025 Grand Prix de Fourmies was the 92nd edition of the Grand Prix de Fourmies, a one-day road cycling race in and around Fourmies in northern France. The race was won by Paul Magnier of Soudal–Quick-Step in a bunch sprint.

== Teams ==
Eleven of the eighteen UCI WorldTeams, ten UCI ProTeams, and four UCI Continental teams made up the twenty-five teams that participated in the race.

UCI WorldTeams

- Alpecin–Deceuninck
- Arkéa–B&B Hotels
- Cofidis
- Decathlon–AG2R La Mondiale
- Groupama–FDJ
- Intermarché–Wanty
- Soudal–Quick-Step
- Team Bahrain Victorious
- Team Picnic–PostNL
- Team Jayco–AlUla
- XDS Astana Team

UCI ProTeams

- Israel–Premier Tech
- Lotto
- Q36.5 Pro Cycling Team
- Team Flanders–Baloise
- Team Polti VisitMalta
- Team TotalEnergies
- Tudor Pro Cycling Team
- Unibet Tietema Rockets
- Uno-X Mobility
- Wagner Bazin WB

UCI Continental Teams

- CIC–U–Nantes
- Nice Métropole Côte d'Azur
- St. Michel–Preference Home–Auber93
- Van Rysel–Roubaix

== Result ==
Result
Rank	Rider	Team	Time
1	Paul Magnier (FRA)	Soudal–Quick-Step	4h 18' 27"
2	Pavel Bittner (CZE)	Team Picnic–PostNL	+ 0"
3	Yevgeniy Fedorov (KAZ)	XDS Astana Team	+ 0"
4	Milan Fretin (BEL)	Cofidis	+ 0"
5	Dylan Groenewegen (NED)	Team Jayco–AlUla	+ 0"
6	Søren Wærenskjold (NOR)	Uno-X Mobility	+ 0"
7	Arvid de Kleijn (NED)	Tudor Pro Cycling Team	+ 0"
8	Timo Kielich (BEL)	Alpecin–Deceuninck	+ 0"
9	Tom Crabbe (BEL)	Team Flanders–Baloise	+ 0"
10	Luca Mozzato (ITA)	Arkéa–B&B Hotels	+ 0"
