= 2024 Bredene Koksijde Classic =

2024 UCI ProSeries

Race details
- Dates: 15 March 2024
- Stages: 1
- Distance: 201.2 km (125.0 mi)
- Winning time: 4h 46' 31"

Results
	Winner	Luca Mozzato (ITA)	(Arkéa–B&B Hotels)
	Second	Dylan Groenewegen (NED)	(Team Jayco–AlUla)
	Third	Gerben Thijssen (BEL)	(Intermarché–Wanty)

The 2024 Bredene Koksijde Classic was the 21st edition of the Bredene Koksijde Classic road cycling one day race, which was held on 15 March 2024, starting and finishing in the titular towns of Bredene and Koksijde, respectively.

== Teams ==
Eight UCI WorldTeams, eleven UCI ProTeams, and four UCI Continental teams made up the twenty-three teams that participated in the race.

UCI WorldTeams

- Alpecin–Deceuninck
- Arkéa–B&B Hotels
- Intermarché–Wanty
- Lidl–Trek
- Soudal–Quick-Step
- Team dsm–firmenich PostNL
- Team Jayco–AlUla
- UAE Team Emirates

UCI ProTeams

- Bingoal WB
- Israel–Premier Tech
- Lotto–Dstny
- Q36.5 Pro Cycling Team
- TDT–Unibet Cycling Team
- Team Flanders–Baloise
- Team Novo Nordisk
- Team TotalEnergies
- Tudor Pro Cycling Team
- Uno-X Mobility

UCI Continental Teams

- Tarteletto–Isorex
- VolkerWessels Women's Pro Cycling Team

== Result ==
Result (1–10)
Rank	Rider	Team	Time
1	Luca Mozzato (ITA)	Arkéa–B&B Hotels	4h 46' 31"
2	Dylan Groenewegen (NED)	Team Jayco–AlUla	+ 0"
3	Gerben Thijssen (BEL)	Intermarché–Wanty	+ 0"
4	Simone Consonni (ITA)	Lidl–Trek	+ 0"
5	Arnaud De Lie (BEL)	Lotto–Dstny	+ 0"
6	Emīls Liepiņš (LAT)	Team dsm–firmenich PostNL	+ 0"
7	Arvid de Kleijn (NED)	Tudor Pro Cycling Team	+ 0"
8	Timothy Dupont (BEL)	Tarteletto–Isorex	+ 0"
9	Hugo Hofstetter (FRA)	Israel–Premier Tech	+ 0"
10	Dries Van Gestel (BEL)	Team TotalEnergies	+ 0"
