= 2018 Le Samyn =

2018 UCI Europe Tour

Race details
- Dates: 27 February 2018
- Stages: 1
- Distance: 200 km (124.3 mi)
- Winning time: 4h 47' 48"

Results
	Winner	Niki Terpstra (NED)	(Quick-Step Floors)
	Second	Philippe Gilbert (BEL)	(Quick-Step Floors)
	Third	Damien Gaudin (FRA)	(Direct Énergie)

The 2018 Le Samyn was the 49th edition of Le Samyn road cycling one day race. It was part of UCI Europe Tour in category 1.1.

== Teams ==
Twenty-one teams were invited to take part in the race. These included three UCI World Tour teams, eleven UCI Professional Continental teams and seven UCI Continental teams.

UCI WorldTeams

- AG2R La Mondiale
- Quick-Step Floors
- Lotto–Soudal

UCI Professional Continental teams

- Wanty–Groupe Gobert
- Aqua Blue Sport
- Cofidis
- Direct Énergie
- Fortuneo–Samsic
- Roompot–Nederlandse Loterij
- Sport Vlaanderen–Baloise
- UnitedHealthcare
- Vérandas Willems–Crelan
- Vital Concept
- WB Aqua Protect Veranclassic

UCI Continental teams

- AGO–Aqua Service
- Cibel–Cebon
- Differdange–Losch
- Sovac–Natura4Ever
- Roubaix–Lille Métropole
- Tarteletto–Isorex
- T.Palm–Pôle Continental Wallon

== General classification ==
Result
Rank	Rider	Team	Time
1	Niki Terpstra (NED)	Quick-Step Floors	4h 47' 48"
2	Philippe Gilbert (BEL)	Quick-Step Floors	+ 24"
3	Damien Gaudin (FRA)	Direct Énergie	+ 46"
4	Adrien Petit (FRA)	Direct Énergie	+ 1' 18"
5	Gediminas Bagdonas (LTU)	AG2R La Mondiale	+ 1' 18"
6	Alex Kirsch (LUX)	WB Aqua Protect Veranclassic	+ 1' 21"
7	Benoît Jarrier (FRA)	Fortuneo–Samsic	+ 1' 59"
8	Nico Denz (GER)	AG2R La Mondiale	+ 1' 59"
9	Frederik Backaert (BEL)	Wanty–Groupe Gobert	+ 1' 59"
10	Alexandre Pichot (FRA)	Direct Énergie	+ 2' 02"
