= 2020 Volta a la Comunitat Valenciana =

2020 UCI Europe Tour 2020 UCI ProSeries
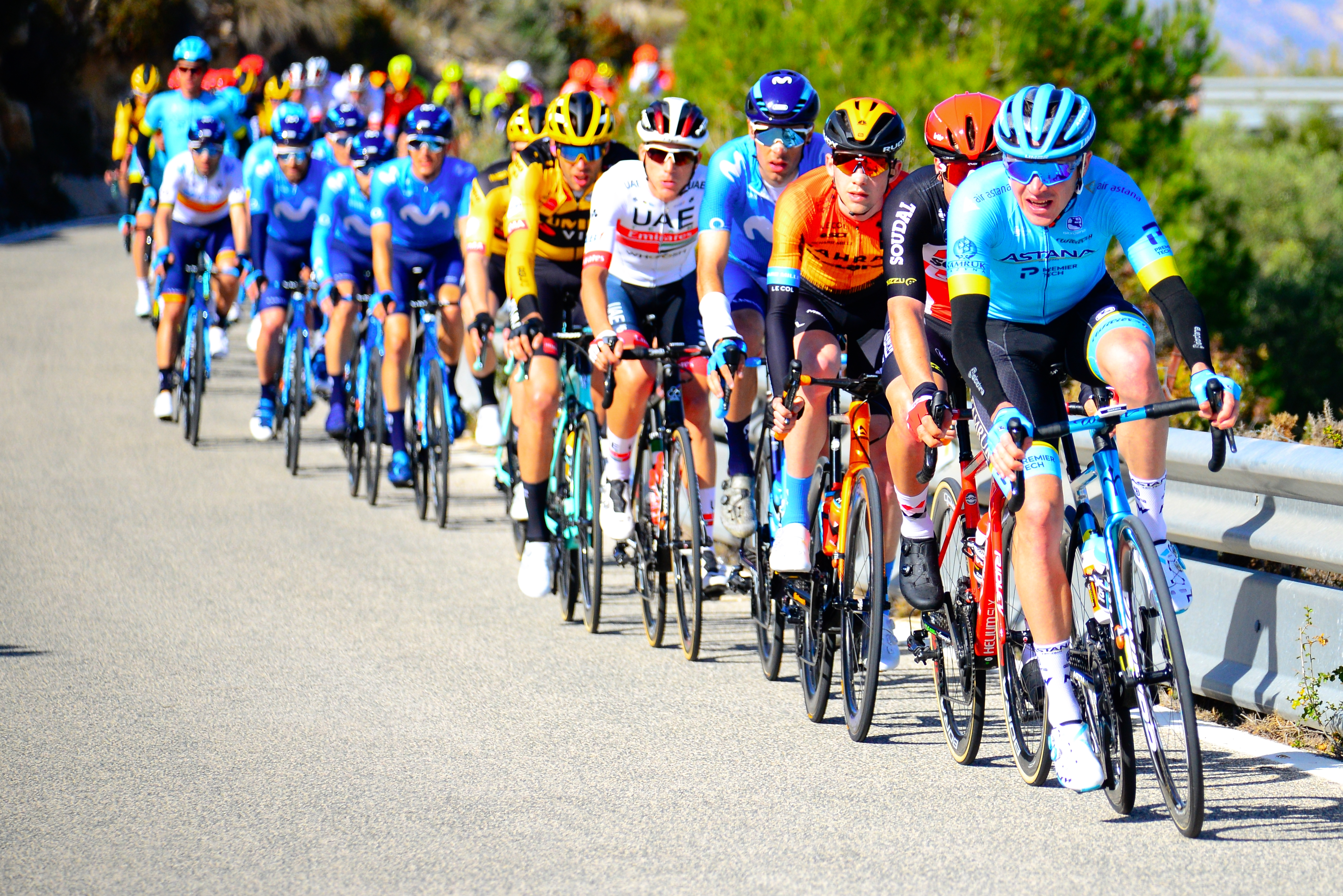

Race details
- Dates: 5–9 February 2020
- Stages: 5
- Distance: 800.2 km (497.2 mi)
- Winning time: 18h 43' 00"

Results
Jersey awarded to the overall winner	Winner	Tadej Pogačar (SLO)	(UAE Team Emirates)
	Second	Jack Haig (AUS)	(Mitchelton–Scott)
	Third	Tao Geoghegan Hart (GBR)	(Team INEOS)
Jersey awarded to the points classification winner	Points	Dylan Groenewegen (NED)	(Team Jumbo–Visma)
Jersey awarded to the mountains classification winner	Mountains	Gonzalo Serrano (ESP)	(Caja Rural–Seguros RGA)
Jersey awarded to the young rider classification winner	Young rider	Tadej Pogačar (SLO)	(UAE Team Emirates)
	Team	Bahrain–McLaren	

The 2020 Volta a la Comunitat Valenciana (English: Tour of the Valencian Community) was a road cycling stage race held from 5 to 9 February 2020 and was the 71st edition of the Volta a la Comunitat Valenciana. It was a 2.Pro event on the 2020 UCI Europe Tour, as well as part of the inaugural UCI ProSeries. The race was run entirely in the autonomous community of Valencia with five stages covering 800.2 kilometers, starting in Castelló de la Plana and finishing in Valencia.

The race was won by Slovenian Tadej Pogačar of the UAE Team Emirates team. Australian rider Jack Haig of Mitchelton–Scott and British rider Tao Geoghegan Hart of Team INEOS finished second and third respectively.

== Teams ==
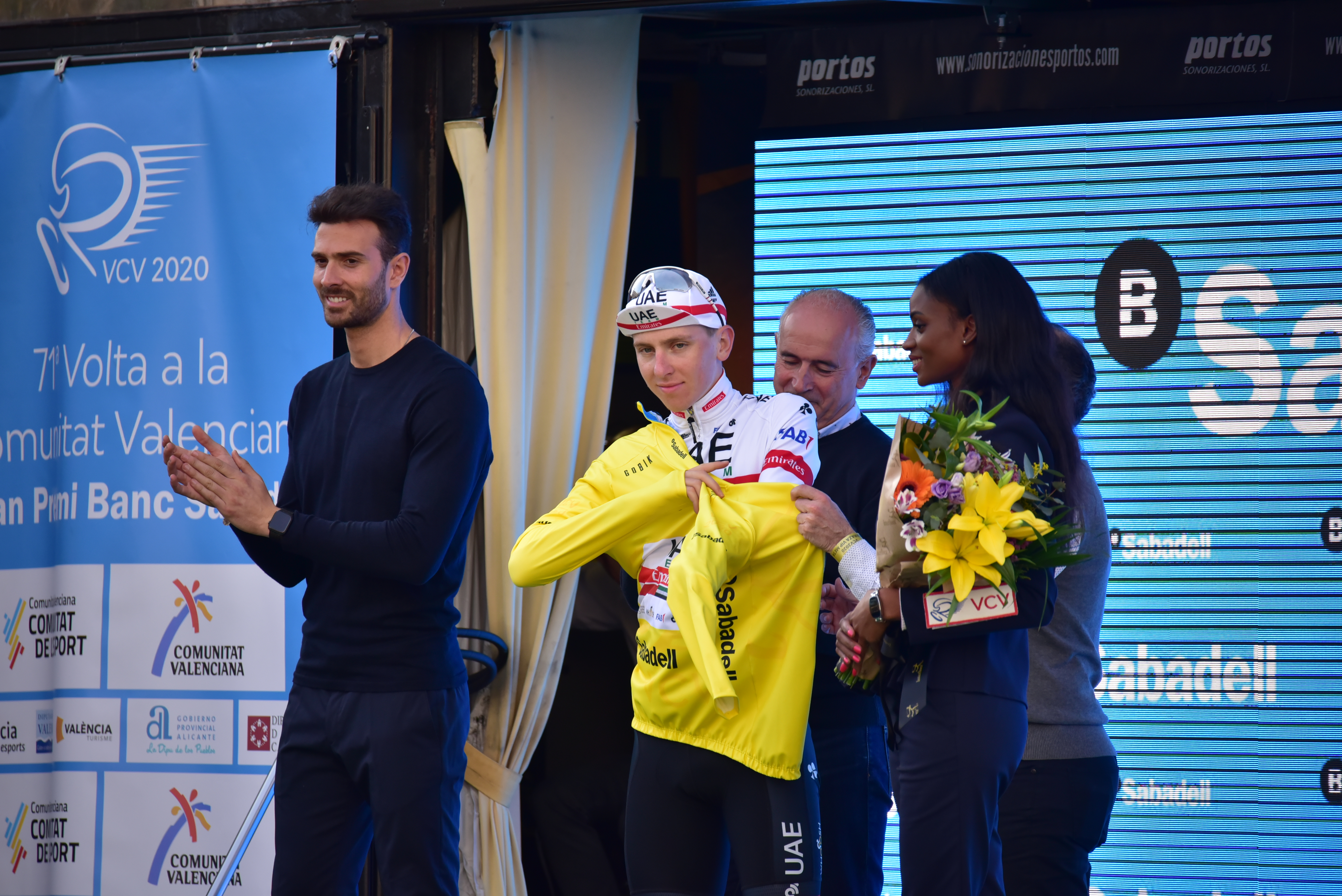
Tadej Pogačar winner of Volta a la Comunitat Valenciana

Twenty-one teams were invited to the race. These teams consisted of twelve UCI WorldTeams, seven UCI Professional Continental teams, and two UCI Continental teams. Each team entered seven riders, except for Bardiani–CSF–Faizanè and UAE Team Emirates, which each submitted six riders. Of the 145 riders that started the race, 137 finished.

UCI WorldTeams

- AG2R La Mondiale
- Astana
- Bahrain–McLaren
- CCC Team
- Deceuninck–Quick-Step
- Israel Start-Up Nation
- Lotto–Soudal
- Mitchelton–Scott
- Movistar Team
- Team INEOS
- Team Jumbo–Visma
- UAE Team Emirates

UCI Professional Continental Teams

- Bardiani–CSF–Faizanè
- Burgos BH
- Caja Rural–Seguros RGA
- Fundación–Orbea
- Gazprom–RusVelo
- Sport Vlaanderen–Baloise
- Total Direct Énergie

UCI Continental Teams

- Equipo Kern Pharma
- Kometa Xstra Cycling Team

== Route ==
Stage characteristics and winners
Stage	Date	Course	Distance	Type	Stage winner
1	5 February	Castelló de la Plana to Villarreal	180 km (110 mi)	Flat stage	Dylan Groenewegen (NED)
2	6 February	Torrent to Cullera	181 km (112 mi)	Hilly stage	Tadej Pogačar (SLO)
3	7 February	Orihuela to Torrevieja	174.5 km (108.4 mi)	Hilly stage	Dylan Groenewegen (NED)
4	8 February	Calp to Sierra de Bernia	167 km (104 mi)	Mountain stage	Tadej Pogačar (SLO)
5	9 February	Paterna to Valencia	97.7 km (60.7 mi)	Flat stage	Fabio Jakobsen (NED)
Total		800.2 km (497.2 mi)			

== Stages ==
=== Stage 1 ===
5 February 2020 — Castelló de la Plana to Villarreal, 180 km (110 mi)

Stage 1 Result
Rank	Rider	Team	Time
1	Dylan Groenewegen (NED)	Team Jumbo–Visma	4h 07' 40"
2	Fabio Jakobsen (NED)	Deceuninck–Quick-Step	+ 0"
3	Alexander Kristoff (NOR)	UAE Team Emirates	+ 0"
4	Ben Swift (GBR)	Team INEOS	+ 0"
5	Juan José Lobato (ESP)	Fundación–Orbea	+ 0"
6	Jon Aberasturi (ESP)	Caja Rural–Seguros RGA	+ 0"
7	John Degenkolb (GER)	Lotto–Soudal	+ 0"
8	Luka Mezgec (SLO)	Mitchelton–Scott	+ 0"
9	Iván García (ESP)	Bahrain–McLaren	+ 0"
10	Lawrence Naesen (BEL)	AG2R La Mondiale	+ 0"

General classification after Stage 1
Rank	Rider	Team	Time
1	Dylan Groenewegen (NED)	Team Jumbo–Visma	4h 07' 40"
2	Fabio Jakobsen (NED)	Deceuninck–Quick-Step	+ 0"
3	Alexander Kristoff (NOR)	UAE Team Emirates	+ 0"
4	Ben Swift (GBR)	Team INEOS	+ 0"
5	Juan José Lobato (ESP)	Fundación–Orbea	+ 0"
6	Jon Aberasturi (ESP)	Caja Rural–Seguros RGA	+ 0"
7	John Degenkolb (GER)	Lotto–Soudal	+ 0"
8	Luka Mezgec (SLO)	Mitchelton–Scott	+ 0"
9	Iván García (ESP)	Bahrain–McLaren	+ 0"
10	Lawrence Naesen (BEL)	AG2R La Mondiale	+ 0"

=== Stage 2 ===
6 February 2020 — Torrent to Cullera, 181 km (112 mi)

Stage 2 Result
Rank	Rider	Team	Time
1	Tadej Pogačar (SLO)	UAE Team Emirates	4h 14' 26"
2	Alejandro Valverde (ESP)	Movistar Team	+ 0"
3	Dylan Teuns (BEL)	Bahrain–McLaren	+ 0"
4	Dan Martin (IRE)	Israel Start-Up Nation	+ 0"
5	Jack Haig (AUS)	Mitchelton–Scott	+ 0"
6	Ion Izagirre (ESP)	Astana	+ 0"
7	Rubén Fernández (ESP)	Fundación–Orbea	+ 0"
8	Gianni Moscon (ITA)	Team INEOS	+ 0"
9	Tao Geoghegan Hart (GBR)	Team INEOS	+ 0"
10	Greg Van Avermaet (BEL)	CCC Team	+ 5"

General classification after Stage 2
Rank	Rider	Team	Time
1	Tadej Pogačar (SLO)	UAE Team Emirates	8h 22' 09"
2	Jack Haig (AUS)	Mitchelton–Scott	+ 0"
3	Alejandro Valverde (ESP)	Movistar Team	+ 0"
4	Rubén Fernández (ESP)	Fundación–Orbea	+ 0"
5	Dylan Teuns (BEL)	Bahrain–McLaren	+ 0"
6	Gianni Moscon (ITA)	Team INEOS	+ 0"
7	Ion Izagirre (ESP)	Astana	+ 0"
8	Tao Geoghegan Hart (GBR)	Team INEOS	+ 0"
9	Dan Martin (IRE)	Israel Start-Up Nation	+ 0"
10	Matej Mohorič (SLO)	Bahrain–McLaren	+ 2"

=== Stage 3 ===
7 February 2020 — Orihuela to Torrevieja, 174.5 km (108.4 mi)

Stage 3 Result
Rank	Rider	Team	Time
1	Dylan Groenewegen (NED)	Team Jumbo–Visma	3h 54' 16"
2	Fabio Jakobsen (NED)	Deceuninck–Quick-Step	+ 0"
3	Matej Mohorič (SLO)	Bahrain–McLaren	+ 0"
4	Davide Cimolai (ITA)	Israel Start-Up Nation	+ 0"
5	Jon Aberasturi (ESP)	Caja Rural–Seguros RGA	+ 0"
6	Luka Mezgec (SLO)	Mitchelton–Scott	+ 0"
7	Amaury Capiot (BEL)	Sport Vlaanderen–Baloise	+ 0"
8	Matteo Trentin (ITA)	CCC Team	+ 0"
9	Tom Van Asbroeck (BEL)	Israel Start-Up Nation	+ 0"
10	Alexander Kristoff (NOR)	UAE Team Emirates	+ 0"

General classification after Stage 3
Rank	Rider	Team	Time
1	Jack Haig (AUS)	Mitchelton–Scott	12h 16' 25"
2	Tadej Pogačar (SLO)	UAE Team Emirates	+ 0"
3	Alejandro Valverde (ESP)	Movistar Team	+ 0"
4	Rubén Fernández (ESP)	Fundación–Orbea	+ 0"
5	Dylan Teuns (BEL)	Bahrain–McLaren	+ 0"
6	Ion Izagirre (ESP)	Astana	+ 0"
7	Tao Geoghegan Hart (GBR)	Team INEOS	+ 0"
8	Matej Mohorič (SLO)	Bahrain–McLaren	+ 2"
9	Jan Polanc (SLO)	UAE Team Emirates	+ 5"
10	Greg Van Avermaet (BEL)	CCC Team	+ 5"

=== Stage 4 ===
8 February 2020 — Calp to Sierra de Bernia, 167 km (104 mi)

Stage 4 Result
Rank	Rider	Team	Time
1	Tadej Pogačar (SLO)	UAE Team Emirates	4h 22' 03"
2	Wout Poels (NED)	Bahrain–McLaren	+ 6"
3	Tao Geoghegan Hart (GBR)	Team INEOS	+ 6"
4	Dan Martin (IRE)	Israel Start-Up Nation	+ 6"
5	Jack Haig (AUS)	Mitchelton–Scott	+ 6"
6	Dylan Teuns (BEL)	Bahrain–McLaren	+ 23"
7	Ion Izagirre (ESP)	Astana	+ 32"
8	Sander Armée (BEL)	Lotto–Soudal	+ 42"
9	Óscar Rodríguez (ESP)	Astana	+ 45"
10	Rubén Fernández (ESP)	Fundación–Orbea	+ 49"

General classification after Stage 4
Rank	Rider	Team	Time
1	Tadej Pogačar (SLO)	UAE Team Emirates	16h 38' 28"
2	Jack Haig (AUS)	Mitchelton–Scott	+ 6"
3	Tao Geoghegan Hart (GBR)	Team INEOS	+ 6"
4	Dan Martin (IRE)	Israel Start-Up Nation	+ 13"
5	Dylan Teuns (BEL)	Bahrain–McLaren	+ 23"
6	Wout Poels (NED)	Bahrain–McLaren	+ 25"
7	Ion Izagirre (ESP)	Astana	+ 32"
8	Rubén Fernández (ESP)	Fundación–Orbea	+ 49"
9	Óscar Rodríguez (ESP)	Astana	+ 1' 11"
10	Alejandro Valverde (ESP)	Movistar Team	+ 1' 14"

=== Stage 5 ===
9 February 2020 — Paterna to Valencia, 97.7 km (60.7 mi)

Stage 5 Result
Rank	Rider	Team	Time
1	Fabio Jakobsen (NED)	Deceuninck–Quick-Step	2h 04' 32"
2	Dylan Groenewegen (NED)	Team Jumbo–Visma	+ 0"
3	John Degenkolb (GER)	Lotto–Soudal	+ 0"
4	Alexander Kristoff (NOR)	UAE Team Emirates	+ 0"
5	Iván García (ESP)	Bahrain–McLaren	+ 0"
6	Jon Aberasturi (ESP)	Caja Rural–Seguros RGA	+ 0"
7	Jaume Sureda (ESP)	Burgos BH	+ 0"
8	Davide Ballerini (ITA)	Deceuninck–Quick-Step	+ 0"
9	Enrique Sanz (ESP)	Equipo Kern Pharma	+ 0"
10	Matteo Trentin (ITA)	CCC Team	+ 0"

General classification after Stage 5
Rank	Rider	Team	Time
1	Tadej Pogačar (SLO)	UAE Team Emirates	18h 43' 00"
2	Jack Haig (AUS)	Mitchelton–Scott	+ 6"
3	Tao Geoghegan Hart (GBR)	Team INEOS	+ 6"
4	Dan Martin (IRE)	Israel Start-Up Nation	+ 13"
5	Dylan Teuns (BEL)	Bahrain–McLaren	+ 23"
6	Wout Poels (NED)	Bahrain–McLaren	+ 25"
7	Ion Izagirre (ESP)	Astana	+ 32"
8	Rubén Fernández (ESP)	Fundación–Orbea	+ 49"
9	Óscar Rodríguez (ESP)	Astana	+ 1' 11"
10	Alejandro Valverde (ESP)	Movistar Team	+ 1' 14"

== Classification leadership table ==
Classification leadership by stage
Stage	Winner	General classification	Points classification	Mountains classification	Young rider classification	Teams classification
1	Dylan Groenewegen	Dylan Groenewegen	Dylan Groenewegen	Cédric Beullens	Fabio Jakobsen	Bahrain–McLaren
2	Tadej Pogačar	Tadej Pogačar	Tadej Pogačar	Álvaro Cuadros	Tadej Pogačar	Bahrain–McLaren
3	Dylan Groenewegen	Jack Haig	Dylan Groenewegen	Álvaro Cuadros	Tadej Pogačar	Bahrain–McLaren
4	Tadej Pogačar	Tadej Pogačar	Tadej Pogačar	Gonzalo Serrano	Tadej Pogačar	Bahrain–McLaren
5	Fabio Jakobsen	Tadej Pogačar	Dylan Groenewegen	Gonzalo Serrano	Tadej Pogačar	Bahrain–McLaren
Final		Tadej Pogačar	Dylan Groenewegen	Gonzalo Serrano	Tadej Pogačar	Bahrain–McLaren

== Classification standings ==
=== General classification ===
Final general classification (1–10)
Rank	Rider	Team	Time
1	Tadej Pogačar (SLO)	UAE Team Emirates	18h 43' 00"
2	Jack Haig (AUS)	Mitchelton–Scott	+ 6"
3	Tao Geoghegan Hart (GBR)	Team INEOS	+ 6"
4	Dan Martin (IRE)	Israel Start-Up Nation	+ 13"
5	Dylan Teuns (BEL)	Bahrain–McLaren	+ 23"
6	Wout Poels (NED)	Bahrain–McLaren	+ 25"
7	Ion Izagirre (ESP)	Astana	+ 32"
8	Rubén Fernández (ESP)	Fundación–Orbea	+ 49"
9	Óscar Rodríguez (ESP)	Astana	+ 1' 11"
10	Alejandro Valverde (ESP)	Movistar Team	+ 1' 14"

=== Points classification ===
Final points classification (1–10)
Rank	Rider	Team	Points
1	Dylan Groenewegen (NED)	Team Jumbo–Visma	70
2	Fabio Jakobsen (NED)	Deceuninck–Quick-Step	65
3	Tadej Pogačar (SLO)	UAE Team Emirates	50
4	Alexander Kristoff (NOR)	UAE Team Emirates	36
5	Jon Aberasturi (ESP)	Caja Rural–Seguros RGA	32
6	Jack Haig (AUS)	Mitchelton–Scott	28
7	Dan Martin (IRE)	Israel Start-Up Nation	28
8	Dylan Teuns (BEL)	Bahrain–McLaren	26
9	John Degenkolb (GER)	Lotto–Soudal	25
10	Davide Cimolai (ITA)	Israel Start-Up Nation	24

=== Mountains classification ===
Final mountains classification (1–10)
Rank	Rider	Team	Points
1	Gonzalo Serrano (ESP)	Caja Rural–Seguros RGA	24
2	Tadej Pogačar (SLO)	UAE Team Emirates	13
3	Álvaro Cuadros (ESP)	Caja Rural–Seguros RGA	12
4	Pello Bilbao (ESP)	Bahrain–McLaren	10
5	Wout Poels (NED)	Bahrain–McLaren	8
6	Ivan Moreno (ESP)	Equipo Kern Pharma	6
7	Tao Geoghegan Hart (GBR)	Team INEOS	6
8	Giovanni Carboni (ITA)	Bardiani–CSF–Faizanè	6
9	Alessandro De Marchi (ITA)	CCC Team	6
10	Tim Declercq (BEL)	Deceuninck–Quick-Step	5

=== Young rider classification ===
Final young rider classification (1–10)
Rank	Rider	Team	Time
1	Tadej Pogačar (SLO)	UAE Team Emirates	18h 43' 00"
2	Tao Geoghegan Hart (GBR)	Team INEOS	+ 6"
3	Óscar Rodríguez (ESP)	Astana	+ 1' 11"
4	James Knox (GBR)	Deceuninck–Quick-Step	+ 1' 22"
5	Jefferson Cepeda (ECU)	Caja Rural–Seguros RGA	+ 2' 58"
6	Márton Dina (HUN)	Kometa Xstra Cycling Team	+ 3' 27"
7	Jon Agirre (ESP)	Equipo Kern Pharma	+ 5' 40"
8	Joan Bou (ESP)	Fundación–Orbea	+ 5' 57"
9	Dmitry Strakhov (RUS)	Gazprom–RusVelo	+ 6' 47"
10	Luca Covili (ITA)	Bardiani–CSF–Faizanè	+ 7' 25"

=== Teams classification ===
Final teams classification (1–10)
Rank	Team	Time
1	Bahrain–McLaren	56h 11' 12"
2	CCC Team	+ 3' 31"
3	Team INEOS	+ 3' 37"
4	Astana	+ 4' 24"
5	Fundación–Orbea	+ 4' 52"
6	UAE Team Emirates	+ 6' 04"
7	Movistar Team	+ 6' 39"
8	Lotto–Soudal	+ 8' 18"
9	Burgos BH	+ 13' 44"
10	AG2R La Mondiale	+ 14' 10"
