= 2026 Kuurne–Brussels–Kuurne =

2026 UCI ProSeries
- Event poster

Race details
- Dates: 1 March 2026
- Stages: 1
- Distance: 194.9 km (121.1 mi)
- Winning time: 4h 26' 05"

Results
	Winner	Matthew Brennan (GBR)	(Visma–Lease a Bike)
	Second	Luca Mozzato (ITA)	(Tudor Pro Cycling Team)
	Third	Matteo Trentin (ITA)	(Tudor Pro Cycling Team)

The 2026 Kuurne–Brussels–Kuurne was the 78th edition of the Kuurne–Brussels–Kuurne cycling classic. It was being held on 1 March 2026 as a category 1.Pro race on the 2026 UCI ProSeries.

== Teams ==
Twenty-five teams participated in the race, including seventeen of the eighteen UCI WorldTeams and eight UCI ProTeams.

UCI WorldTeams

- Alpecin–Premier Tech
- Decathlon CMA CGM
- EF Education–EasyPost
- Groupama–FDJ United
- Lidl–Trek
- Lotto–Intermarché
- Movistar Team
- NSN Cycling Team
- Red Bull–Bora–Hansgrohe
- Soudal–Quick-Step
- Team Bahrain Victorious
- Team Jayco–AlUla
- Team Picnic–PostNL
- Visma–Lease a Bike
- UAE Team Emirates XRG
- Uno-X Mobility
- XDS Astana Team

UCI ProTeams

- Burgos Burpellet BH
- Cofidis
- Modern Adventure Pro Cycling
- Pinarello–Q36.5 Pro Cycling Team
- Team Flanders–Baloise
- Team TotalEnergies
- Tudor Pro Cycling Team
- Unibet Rose Rockets

== Result ==
Result
Rank	Rider	Team	Time
1	Matthew Brennan (GBR)	Visma–Lease a Bike	4h 26' 05"
2	Luca Mozzato (ITA)	Tudor Pro Cycling Team	+ 0"
3	Matteo Trentin (ITA)	Tudor Pro Cycling Team	+ 0"
4	Matevž Govekar (SLO)	Team Bahrain Victorious	+ 0"
5	Mike Teunissen (NED)	XDS Astana Team	+ 0"
6	Laurenz Rex (BEL)	Soudal–Quick-Step	+ 0"
7	Tobias Lund Andresen (DEN)	Decathlon CMA CGM	+ 0"
8	Cees Bol (NED)	Decathlon CMA CGM	+ 0"
9	Luke Lamperti (USA)	EF Education–EasyPost	+ 0"
10	Jordi Meeus (BEL)	Red Bull–Bora–Hansgrohe	+ 0"
