= Gooikse Pijl =

Belgian one-day road cycling race

Gooikse pijl

Race details
- Date: End of September
- Region: Flemish Brabant, Belgium
- Discipline: Road
- Competition: UCI Europe Tour
- Type: Single-day
- Web site: www.gooiksportief.be

History
- First edition: 2004
- Editions: 23 (as of 2026)
- First winner: Renaud Boxus (BEL)
- Most wins: No repeat winners
- Most recent: Max Kanter (GER)

The Gooikse pijl is a European bicycle race held in and around Gooik, Belgium. Since 2012, the race has been organised as a 1.2 event on the UCI Europe Tour. Since 2018 it is organized as an 1.1 event.

== Winners ==
Year	Country	Rider	Team
2004	Belgium	Renaud Boxus	
2005	Belgium	Jürgen Roelandts	Bodysol–Win for Life–Jong Vlaanderen
2006	Lithuania	Vytautas Kaupas	Jartazi–7Mobile
2007	Belgium	Fabio Polazzi	Pôle Continental Wallon Bergasol-Euro Millions
2008	Belgium	Fréderique Robert	PWS Eijssen
2009	Belgium	Dieter Cappelle	
2010	Belgium	Eliot Lietaer	Beveren 2000
2011	Belgium	Benjamin Verraes	Jong Vlaanderen–Bauknecht
2012	United States	Ken Hanson	Optum–Kelly Benefit Strategies
2013	Norway	Vegard Bugge	Joker–Merida
2014	Belgium	Roy Jans	Wanty–Groupe Gobert
2015	Belgium	Oliver Naesen	Topsport Vlaanderen–Baloise
2016	Lithuania	Aidis Kruopis	Verandas Willems
2017	Belgium	Kenny Dehaes	Wanty–Groupe Gobert
2018	Belgium	Jordi Meeus	SEG Racing Academy
2019	Germany	Pascal Ackermann	Bora–Hansgrohe
2020	Netherlands	Danny van Poppel	Circus–Wanty Gobert
2021	Netherlands	Fabio Jakobsen	Deceuninck–Quick-Step
2022	Belgium	Gerben Thijssen	Intermarché–Wanty–Gobert Matériaux
2023	Belgium	Jasper Philipsen	Alpecin–Deceuninck
2024	Belgium	Tim Merlier	Soudal–Quick-Step
2025	Israel	Oded Kogut	Israel–Premier Tech
2026	Germany	Max Kanter	XDS Astana Team
