= 2019 Team Jumbo–Visma season =

Team Jumbo–Visma
- 2019 season
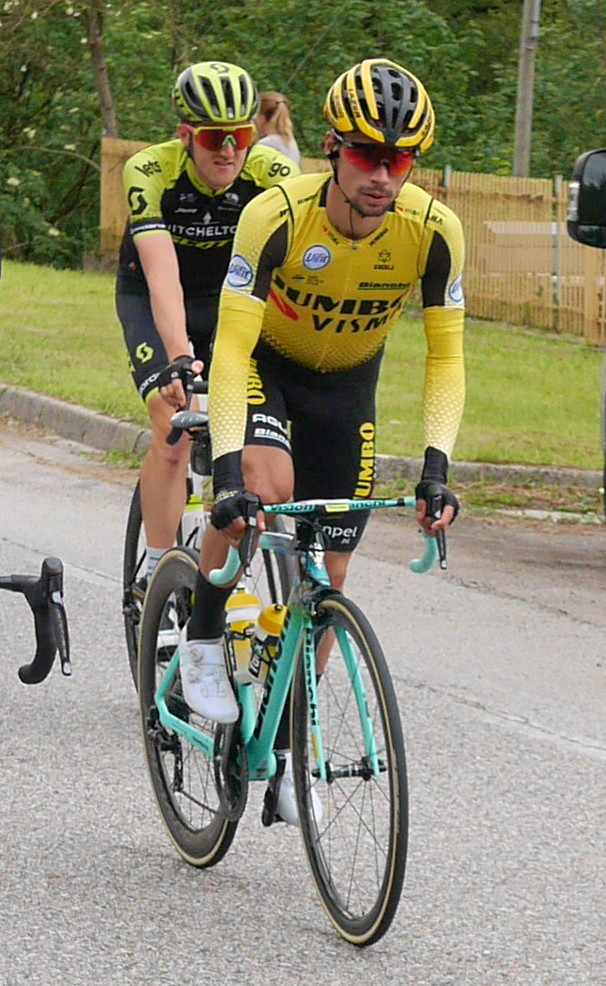
- Primož Roglič in Giro d'Italia where he won 2 stages and finished 3rd overall. In the end of 2019 season Roglič was ranked as first on UCI ranking list.
- Status: UCI WorldTeam
- World Tour Rank: 3
- Manager: Richard Plugge
- Main sponsor(s): Jumbo & Visma
- Based: Netherlands
- Bicycles: Bianchi
- Groupset: Shimano

Season victories
- One-day races: 5
- Stage race overall: 8
- Stage race stages: 33
- Grand Tours: 1
- National Championships: 4
- Most wins: Dylan Groenewegen (15 wins)
- Best ranked rider: Primož Roglič (1st)
- Jersey

The 2019 season for the Team Jumbo–Visma road cycling team which began in January at the Tour Down Under. As a UCI WorldTeam, they were automatically invited and obligated to send a squad to every event in the UCI World Tour.

== Team roster ==
As of 22 December 2018.

Rider	Date of birth
George Bennett (NZL)	7 April 1990 (aged 28)
Koen Bouwman (NED)	2 December 1993 (aged 25)
Laurens De Plus (BEL)	4 September 1995 (aged 23)
Floris De Tier (BEL)	20 January 1992 (aged 26)
Pascal Eenkhoorn (NED)	8 February 1997 (aged 21)
Robert Gesink (NED)	31 May 1986 (aged 32)
Dylan Groenewegen (NED)	21 June 1993 (aged 25)
Lennard Hofstede (NED)	29 December 1994 (aged 23)
Amund Grøndahl Jansen (NOR)	11 February 1994 (aged 24)
Steven Kruijswijk (NED)	7 June 1987 (aged 31)
Sepp Kuss (USA)	13 September 1994 (aged 24)
Tom Leezer (NED)	26 December 1985 (aged 32)
Bert-Jan Lindeman (NED)	16 June 1989 (aged 29)
Paul Martens (GER)	26 October 1983 (aged 35)

Rider	Date of birth
Tony Martin (GER)	23 April 1985 (aged 33)
Daan Olivier (NED)	24 November 1992 (aged 26)
Neilson Powless (USA)	3 September 1996 (aged 22)
Primož Roglič (SLO)	29 October 1989 (aged 29)
Timo Roosen (NED)	11 January 1993 (aged 25)
Mike Teunissen (NED)	25 August 1992 (aged 26)
Antwan Tolhoek (NED)	29 April 1994 (aged 24)
Wout van Aert (Note: van Aert joined the team on 1 March) (BEL)	15 September 1994 (aged 24)
Taco van der Hoorn (NED)	4 December 1993 (aged 25)
Jos van Emden (NED)	27 June 1985 (aged 33)
Danny van Poppel (NED)	26 July 1993 (aged 25)
Jonas Vingegaard (DEN)	10 December 1996 (aged 22)
Maarten Wynants (BEL)	13 May 1982 (aged 36)

Riders who joined the team for the 2019 season

Rider	2018 team
Laurens De Plus	Quick-Step Floors
Lennard Hofstede	Team Sunweb
Tony Martin	Team Katusha–Alpecin
Mike Teunissen	Team Sunweb
Wout van Aert	Vérandas Willems–Crelan
Taco van der Hoorn	Roompot–Nederlandse Loterij
Jonas Vingegaard	Team ColoQuick

Riders who left the team during or after the 2018 season

Rider	2019 team
Enrico Battaglin	Team Katusha–Alpecin
Lars Boom	Roompot–Charles
Stef Clement	Retired
Bram Tankink	Retired
Gijs Van Hoecke	CCC Team
Robert Wagner	Arkéa–Samsic

== Season victories ==
Date	Race	Competition	Rider	Country	Location
10 February	Volta a la Comunitat Valenciana, Stage 5	UCI Europe Tour	Dylan Groenewegen (NED)	Spain	Valencia
23 February	Volta ao Algarve, Stage 4	UCI Europe Tour	Dylan Groenewegen (NED)	Portugal	Tavira
24 February	UAE Tour, Stage 1 (TTT)	UCI World Tour	(Note: The winning riders were Primož Roglič, Koen Bouwman, Laurens De Plus, Tom Leezer, Paul Martens, Tony Martin and Jos van Emden)	United Arab Emirates	Al Hudayriat Island
1 March	UAE Tour, Stage 6	UCI World Tour	Primož Roglič (SLO)	United Arab Emirates	Jebel Jais
2 March	UAE Tour, Overall	UCI World Tour	Primož Roglič (SLO)	United Arab Emirates	
10 March	Paris−Nice, Stage 1	UCI World Tour	Dylan Groenewegen (NED)	France	Saint-Germain-en-Laye
11 March	Paris−Nice, Stage 2	UCI World Tour	Dylan Groenewegen (NED)	France	Bellegarde
19 March	Tirreno–Adriatico, Overall	UCI World Tour	Primož Roglič (SLO)	Italy	
27 March	Three Days of Bruges–De Panne	UCI World Tour	Dylan Groenewegen (NED)	Belgium	De Panne
1 May	Tour de Romandie, Stage 1	UCI World Tour	Primož Roglič (SLO)	Switzerland	La Chaux-de-Fonds
4 May	Tour de Romandie, Stage 4	UCI World Tour	Primož Roglič (SLO)	Switzerland	Torgon
5 May	Tour de Romandie, Stage 5 (ITT)	UCI World Tour	Primož Roglič (SLO)	Switzerland	Geneva
5 May	Tour de Romandie, Overall	UCI World Tour	Primož Roglič (SLO)	Switzerland	
5 May	Tour de Romandie, Points classification	UCI World Tour	Primož Roglič (SLO)	Switzerland	
11 May	Giro d'Italia, Stage 1 (ITT)	UCI World Tour	Primož Roglič (SLO)	Italy	Bologna
14 May	Four Days of Dunkirk, Stage 1	UCI Europe Tour	Dylan Groenewegen (NED)	France	Condé-sur-l'Escaut
15 May	Four Days of Dunkirk, Stage 2	UCI Europe Tour	Dylan Groenewegen (NED)	France	Saint-Quentin
16 May	Four Days of Dunkirk, Stage 3	UCI Europe Tour	Dylan Groenewegen (NED)	France	Compiègne
18 May	Four Days of Dunkirk, Stage 5	UCI Europe Tour	Mike Teunissen (NED)	France	Cassel
19 May	Giro d'Italia, Stage 9 (ITT)	UCI World Tour	Primož Roglič (SLO)	San Marino	San Marino
19 May	Four Days of Dunkirk, Stage 6	UCI Europe Tour	Mike Teunissen (NED)	France	Dunkirk
19 May	Four Days of Dunkirk, Overall	UCI Europe Tour	Mike Teunissen (NED)	France	
19 May	Four Days of Dunkirk, Points classification	UCI Europe Tour	Mike Teunissen (NED)	France	
24 May	Hammer Stavanger, Stage 1 (climb)	UCI Europe Tour	(Note: The winning riders were Amund Grøndahl Jansen, Pascal Eenkhoorn, Jonas Vingegaard, Mike Teunissen, and Maarten Wynants)	Norway	Stavanger
26 May	Hammer Stavanger, Overall	UCI Europe Tour	(Note: The winning riders were Amund Grøndahl Jansen, Dylan Groenewegen, Pascal Eenkhoorn, Jonas Vingegaard, Mike Teunissen, and Maarten Wynants)	Norway	Stavanger
12 June	Critérium du Dauphiné, Stage 4 (ITT)	UCI World Tour	Wout van Aert (BEL)	France	Roanne
13 June	Critérium du Dauphiné, Stage 5	UCI World Tour	Wout van Aert (BEL)	France	Voiron
16 June	Critérium du Dauphiné, Points classification	UCI World Tour	Wout van Aert (BEL)	France	
19 June	ZLM Tour, Prologue	UCI Europe Tour	Jos Van Emden (NED)	Netherlands	Yerseke
20 June	ZLM Tour, Stage 1	UCI Europe Tour	Dylan Groenewegen (NED)	Netherlands	Heinkenszand
20 June	Tour de Suisse, Stage 6	UCI World Tour	Antwan Tolhoek (NED)	Switzerland	Flumserberg
21 June	ZLM Tour, Stage 2	UCI Europe Tour	Dylan Groenewegen (NED)	Netherlands	Buchten
22 June	ZLM Tour, Stage 3	UCI Europe Tour	Mike Teunissen (NED)	Netherlands	Landgraaf
23 June	ZLM Tour, Overall	UCI Europe Tour	Mike Teunissen (NED)	Netherlands	
23 June	ZLM Tour, Points classification	UCI Europe Tour	Dylan Groenewegen (NED)	Netherlands	
23 June	ZLM Tour, Team classification	UCI Europe Tour	(Note: The winning riders were Mike Teunissen, Jos van Emden, Dylan Groenewegen, Tony Martin, Tom Leezer, Amund Grøndahl Jansen and Maarten Wynants)	Netherlands	
6 July	Tour de France, Stage 1	UCI World Tour	Mike Teunissen (NED)	Belgium	Brussels
7 July	Tour de France, Stage 2 (TTT)	UCI World Tour	(Note: The winning riders were Mike Teunissen, Dylan Groenewegen, Laurens De Plus, Amund Grøndahl Jansen, Tony Martin, George Bennett, Steven Kruijswijk and Wout van Aert)	Belgium	Brussels
12 July	Tour de France, Stage 7	UCI World Tour	Dylan Groenewegen (NED)	France	Chalon-sur-Saône
15 July	Tour de France, Stage 10	UCI World Tour	Wout van Aert (BEL)	France	Albi
8 August	Tour de Pologne, Stage 6	UCI World Tour	Jonas Vingegaard (DEN)	Poland	Kościelisko
18 August	BinckBank Tour, Overall	UCI World Tour	Laurens De Plus (BEL)	Belgium; Netherlands	
3 September	Vuelta a España, Stage 10 (ITT)	UCI World Tour	Primož Roglič (SLO)	Spain	Pau
7 September	Tour of Britain, Stage 1	UCI Europe Tour	Dylan Groenewegen (NED)	United Kingdom	Kirkcudbright
8 September	Vuelta a España, Stage 15	UCI World Tour	Sepp Kuss (USA)	Spain	Santuario del Acebo
9 September	Tour of Britain, Stage 3	UCI Europe Tour	Dylan Groenewegen (NED)	United Kingdom	Newcastle upon Tyne
11 September	Tour of Britain, Stage 5	UCI Europe Tour	Dylan Groenewegen (NED)	United Kingdom	Birkenhead
15 September	Vuelta a España, Overall	UCI World Tour	Primož Roglič (SLO)	Spain	
15 September	Vuelta a España, Points classification	UCI World Tour	Primož Roglič (SLO)	Spain	
5 October	Giro dell'Emilia	UCI Europe Tour	Primož Roglič (SLO)	Italy	San Luca
8 October	Tre Valli Varesine	UCI Europe Tour	Primož Roglič (SLO)	Italy	Varese
12 October	Tacx Pro Classic	UCI Europe Tour	Dylan Groenewegen (NED)	Netherlands	Neeltje Jans
20 October	Chrono des Nations	UCI Europe Tour	Jos Van Emden (NED)	France	Les Herbiers

== National, Continental and World champions 2019 ==
Date	Discipline	Jersey	Rider	Country	Location
26 June	Dutch National Time Trial Championships		Jos Van Emden (NED)	Netherlands	Ede
27 June	Belgian National Time Trial Championships		Wout Van Aert (BEL)	Belgium	Middelkerke
28 June	German National Time Trial Championships		Tony Martin (GER)	Germany	Spremberg
30 June	Norwegian National Road Race Championships		Amund Grøndahl Jansen (NOR)	Norway	Røyse
