= 2019 ZLM Tour =

2019 UCI Europe Tour

Race details
- Dates: 19–23 June
- Stages: 5
- Distance: 705.3 km (438.3 mi)
- Winning time: 16h 00' 47"

Results
Jersey awarded to the overall winner	Winner	Mike Teunissen (NED)	(Team Jumbo–Visma)
	Second	Amund Grøndahl Jansen (NOR)	(Team Jumbo–Visma)
	Third	Mads Würtz Schmidt (DEN)	(Team Katusha–Alpecin)
Jersey awarded to the points classification winner	Points	Dylan Groenewegen (NED)	(Team Jumbo–Visma)
Jersey awarded to the youth classification winner	Youth	Rasmus Byriel Iversen (DEN)	(Lotto–Soudal)
	Team	Team Jumbo–Visma	

The 2019 ZLM Tour was the 32nd edition of the ZLM Tour cycling stage race. It started on 19 June in Yerseke and ended on 23 June in Tilburg and was a part of the 2019 UCI Europe Tour as a 2.1-ranked event.

The race was won by Mike Teunissen of Team Jumbo–Visma. Teammate Amund Grøndahl Jansen finished second, and Mads Würtz Schmidt of Katusha–Alpecin rounded out the podium. Dylan Groenewegen of Team Jumbo–Visma took the points classification, Rasmus Byriel Iversen of Lotto–Soudal took the young rider classification, and Team Jumbo–Visma took the teams classification.

== Teams ==
Seventeen teams, which consisted of four UCI WorldTeams, six Professional Continental Teams, and seven UCI Continental Teams, competed in the race. Each team entered seven riders, except for Euskadi–Murias and Wanty–Gobert, who each entered six riders, and Team Differdange–Geba, who entered five riders. Of the 115 riders who started the race, only 101 riders finished the race.

UCI WorldTeams

- Lotto–Soudal
- Team Jumbo–Visma
- Team Katusha–Alpecin
- Team Sunweb

UCI Professional Continental Teams

- Burgos BH
- Euskadi–Murias
- Roompot–Charles
- Sport Vlaanderen–Baloise
- Wallonie Bruxelles
- Wanty–Gobert

UCI Continental Teams

- Alecto Cycling Team
- Metec–TKH
- Monkey Town Continental Team
- Pro Racing Sunshine Coast
- Tarteletto–Isorex
- Team Differdange–Geba
- Vlasman CT

== Route ==
Stage characteristics and winners
Stage	Date	Course	Distance	Type	Stage winner
P	19 June	Yerseke to Yerseke	6.8 km (4.2 mi)	Flat stage	Jos Van Emden (NED)
1	20 June	Bredene to Heinkenszand	197.9 km (123.0 mi)	Flat stage	Dylan Groenewegen (NED)
2	21 June	Etten-Leur to Buchten	168.1 km (104.5 mi)	Flat stage	Dylan Groenewegen (NED)
3	22 June	Buchten to Landgraaf	162.4 km (100.9 mi)	Hilly stage	Amund Grøndahl Jansen (NOR)
4	23 June	Eindhoven to Tilburg	170.1 km (105.7 mi)	Flat stage	Caleb Ewan (AUS)
Total		705.3 km (438.3 mi)			

== Stages ==
=== Prologue ===
19 June 2019 – Yerseke to Yerseke, 6.8 km (4.2 mi)

Prologue result
Rank	Rider	Team	Time
1	Jos Van Emden (NED)	Team Jumbo–Visma	7' 54"
2	Mike Teunissen (NED)	Team Jumbo–Visma	+ 2"
3	Tony Martin (GER)	Team Jumbo–Visma	+ 2"
4	Alex Dowsett (GBR)	Team Katusha–Alpecin	+ 4"
5	Max Walscheid (GER)	Team Sunweb	+ 6"
6	Cees Bol (NED)	Team Sunweb	+ 8"
7	Mads Würtz Schmidt (DEN)	Team Katusha–Alpecin	+ 11"
8	Jasper De Buyst (BEL)	Lotto–Soudal	+ 14"
9	Jenthe Biermans (BEL)	Team Katusha–Alpecin	+ 16"
10	Asbjørn Kragh Andersen (DEN)	Team Sunweb	+ 18"

General classification after Prologue
Rank	Rider	Team	Time
1	Jos Van Emden (NED)	Team Jumbo–Visma	7' 54"
2	Mike Teunissen (NED)	Team Jumbo–Visma	+ 2"
3	Tony Martin (GER)	Team Jumbo–Visma	+ 2"
4	Alex Dowsett (GBR)	Team Katusha–Alpecin	+ 4"
5	Max Walscheid (GER)	Team Sunweb	+ 6"
6	Cees Bol (NED)	Team Sunweb	+ 8"
7	Mads Würtz Schmidt (DEN)	Team Katusha–Alpecin	+ 11"
8	Jasper De Buyst (BEL)	Lotto–Soudal	+ 14"
9	Jenthe Biermans (BEL)	Team Katusha–Alpecin	+ 16"
10	Asbjørn Kragh Andersen (DEN)	Team Sunweb	+ 18"

=== Stage 1 ===
20 June 2019 – Bredene to Heinkenszand, 197.9 km (123.0 mi)

Stage 1 result
Rank	Rider	Team	Time
1	Dylan Groenewegen (NED)	Team Jumbo–Visma	4h 20' 37"
2	Emīls Liepiņš (LAT)	Wallonie Bruxelles	+ 0"
3	Caleb Ewan (AUS)	Lotto–Soudal	+ 0"
4	Jens Debusschere (BEL)	Team Katusha–Alpecin	+ 0"
5	Boris Vallée (BEL)	Wanty–Gobert	+ 0"
6	Amaury Capiot (BEL)	Sport Vlaanderen–Baloise	+ 0"
7	Daniel López (SPA)	Burgos BH	+ 0"
8	Milan Menten (BEL)	Sport Vlaanderen–Baloise	+ 0"
9	Mads Würtz Schmidt (DEN)	Team Katusha–Alpecin	+ 0"
10	Arvid de Kleijn (NED)	Metec–TKH	+ 0"

General classification after Stage 1
Rank	Rider	Team	Time
1	Jos Van Emden (NED)	Team Jumbo–Visma	4h 28' 31"
2	Mike Teunissen (NED)	Team Jumbo–Visma	+ 2"
3	Tony Martin (GER)	Team Jumbo–Visma	+ 2"
4	Alex Dowsett (GBR)	Team Katusha–Alpecin	+ 4"
5	Max Walscheid (GER)	Team Sunweb	+ 6"
6	Cees Bol (NED)	Team Sunweb	+ 8"
7	Mads Würtz Schmidt (DEN)	Team Katusha–Alpecin	+ 11"
8	Dylan Groenewegen (NED)	Team Jumbo–Visma	+ 13"
9	Jasper De Buyst (BEL)	Lotto–Soudal	+ 14"
10	Jenthe Biermans (BEL)	Team Katusha–Alpecin	+ 16"

=== Stage 2 ===
21 June 2019 – Etten-Leur to Buchten, 168.1 km (104.5 mi)

Stage 2 result
Rank	Rider	Team	Time
1	Dylan Groenewegen (NED)	Team Jumbo–Visma	3h 43' 47"
2	Caleb Ewan (AUS)	Lotto–Soudal	+ 0"
3	Mike Teunissen (NED)	Team Jumbo–Visma	+ 0"
4	Jens Debusschere (BEL)	Team Katusha–Alpecin	+ 0"
5	Boris Vallée (BEL)	Wanty–Gobert	+ 0"
6	Bas Van Der Kooij (NED)	Monkey Town Continental Team	+ 0"
7	Emīls Liepiņš (LAT)	Wallonie Bruxelles	+ 0"
8	Michael Van Staeyen (BEL)	Roompot–Charles	+ 0"
9	Jasper De Buyst (BEL)	Lotto–Soudal	+ 0"
10	Max Walscheid (GER)	Team Sunweb	+ 0"

General classification after Stage 2
Rank	Rider	Team	Time
1	Mike Teunissen (NED)	Team Jumbo–Visma	8h 12' 16"
2	Jos Van Emden (NED)	Team Jumbo–Visma	+ 2"
3	Dylan Groenewegen (NED)	Team Jumbo–Visma	+ 5"
4	Alex Dowsett (GBR)	Team Katusha–Alpecin	+ 6"
5	Max Walscheid (GER)	Team Sunweb	+ 6"
6	Cees Bol (NED)	Team Sunweb	+ 7"
7	Mads Würtz Schmidt (DEN)	Team Katusha–Alpecin	+ 13"
8	Jasper De Buyst (BEL)	Lotto–Soudal	+ 16"
9	Tony Martin (GER)	Team Jumbo–Visma	+ 16"
10	Jenthe Biermans (BEL)	Team Katusha–Alpecin	+ 18"

=== Stage 3 ===
22 June 2019 – Buchten to Landgraaf, 162.4 km (100.9 mi)

The stage was shortened after the race jury decided to finish the race a lap early after the police raised concerns about the level of traffic on the finishing circuit.

Stage 3 result
Rank	Rider	Team	Time
1	Amund Grøndahl Jansen (NOR)	Team Jumbo–Visma	3h 55' 14"
2	Mike Teunissen (NED)	Team Jumbo–Visma	+ 2"
3	Mads Würtz Schmidt (DEN)	Team Katusha–Alpecin	+ 2"
4	Maurits Lammertink (NED)	Roompot–Charles	+ 2"
5	Huub Duyn (NED)	Roompot–Charles	+ 2"
6	Jelle Wallays (BEL)	Lotto–Soudal	+ 2"
7	Jan Bakelants (BEL)	Team Sunweb	+ 2"
8	Jasper De Buyst (BEL)	Wallonie Bruxelles	+ 2"
9	Dimitri Peyskens (BEL)	Lotto–Soudal	+ 2"
10	Bas Van Der Kooij (NED)	Monkey Town Continental Team	+ 2"

General classification after Stage 3
Rank	Rider	Team	Time
1	Mike Teunissen (NED)	Team Jumbo–Visma	12h 07' 23"
2	Amund Grøndahl Jansen (NOR)	Team Jumbo–Visma	+ 15"
3	Mads Würtz Schmidt (DEN)	Team Katusha–Alpecin	+ 16"
4	Jasper De Buyst (BEL)	Lotto–Soudal	+ 25"
5	Jan Bakelants (BEL)	Team Sunweb	+ 32"
6	Maurits Lammertink (NED)	Roompot–Charles	+ 39"
7	Jos Van Emden (NED)	Team Jumbo–Visma	+ 44"
8	Jelle Wallays (BEL)	Lotto–Soudal	+ 46"
9	Dylan Groenewegen (NED)	Team Jumbo–Visma	+ 47"
10	Alex Dowsett (GBR)	Team Katusha–Alpecin	+ 48"

=== Stage 4 ===
23 June 2019 – Eindhoven to Tilburg, 170.1 km (105.7 mi)

Stage 4 result
Rank	Rider	Team	Time
1	Caleb Ewan (AUS)	Lotto–Soudal	3h 53' 24"
2	Max Walscheid (GER)	Team Sunweb	+ 0"
3	Dylan Groenewegen (NED)	Team Jumbo–Visma	+ 0"
4	Arvid de Kleijn (NED)	Metec–TKH	+ 0"
5	Emīls Liepiņš (LAT)	Wallonie Bruxelles	+ 0"
6	Bas Van Der Kooij (NED)	Monkey Town Continental Team	+ 0"
7	Cameron Scott (AUS)	Pro Racing Sunshine Coast	+ 0"
8	Michael Van Staeyen (BEL)	Roompot–Charles	+ 0"
9	Daniel López (SPA)	Burgos BH	+ 0"
10	Manuel Peñalver (SPA)	Burgos BH	+ 0"

Final general classification
Rank	Rider	Team	Time
1	Mike Teunissen (NED)	Team Jumbo–Visma	16h 00' 47"
2	Amund Grøndahl Jansen (NOR)	Team Jumbo–Visma	+ 14"
3	Mads Würtz Schmidt (DEN)	Team Katusha–Alpecin	+ 16"
4	Jasper De Buyst (BEL)	Lotto–Soudal	+ 25"
5	Jan Bakelants (BEL)	Team Sunweb	+ 32"
6	Maurits Lammertink (NED)	Roompot–Charles	+ 39"
7	Jos Van Emden (NED)	Team Jumbo–Visma	+ 43"
8	Jelle Wallays (BEL)	Lotto–Soudal	+ 44"
9	Dylan Groenewegen (NED)	Team Jumbo–Visma	+ 46"
10	Alex Dowsett (GBR)	Team Katusha–Alpecin	+ 48"

== Classification leadership table ==
In the 2019 ZLM Tour, three jerseys were awarded. The general classification was calculated by adding each cyclist's finishing times on each stage. Time bonuses were awarded to the first three finishers on all stages except for the individual time trial: the stage winner won a ten-second bonus, with six and four seconds for the second and third riders respectively. Bonus seconds were also awarded to the first three riders at intermediate sprints – three seconds for the winner of the sprint, two seconds for the rider in second and one second for the rider in third. The leader of the general classification received a yellow jersey. This classification was considered the most important of the 2019 ZLM Tour, and the winner of the classification was considered the winner of the race.

Points for stage victory
Position	1	2	3	4	5	6	7	8	9	10
Points awarded	15	12	10	8	6	5	4	3	2	1

The second classification was the points classification. Riders were awarded points for finishing in the top ten in a stage. Unlike in the points classification in the Tour de France, the winners of all stages were awarded the same number of points. Points were also won in intermediate sprints; three points for crossing the sprint line first, two points for second place, and one for third. The leader of the points classification was awarded a blue jersey.

The third jersey represented the young rider classification, marked by a white jersey. Only riders born after 1 January 1997 were eligible; the young rider best placed in the general classification was the leader of the young rider classification.

Stage	Winner	General classification	Points classification	Young rider classification	Teams classification
P	Jos Van Emden	Jos Van Emden	not awarded	Rasmus Byriel Iversen	Team Jumbo–Visma
1	Dylan Groenewegen	Jos Van Emden	Dylan Groenewegen	Rasmus Byriel Iversen	Team Jumbo–Visma
2	Dylan Groenewegen	Mike Teunissen	Dylan Groenewegen	Rasmus Byriel Iversen	Team Jumbo–Visma
3	Amund Grøndahl Jansen	Mike Teunissen	Dylan Groenewegen	Rasmus Byriel Iversen	Team Jumbo–Visma
4	Caleb Ewan	Mike Teunissen	Dylan Groenewegen	Rasmus Byriel Iversen	Team Jumbo–Visma
Final		Mike Teunissen	Dylan Groenewegen	Rasmus Byriel Iversen	Team Jumbo–Visma

== Final classifications ==
Legend
Denotes the leader of the general classification
Denotes the leader of the points classification
Denotes the leader of the young rider classification

=== General classification ===
Final general classification (1-10)
Rank	Rider	Team	Time
1	Mike Teunissen (NED)	Team Jumbo–Visma	16h 00' 47"
2	Amund Grøndahl Jansen (NOR)	Team Jumbo–Visma	+ 14"
3	Mads Würtz Schmidt (DEN)	Team Katusha–Alpecin	+ 16"
4	Jasper De Buyst (BEL)	Lotto–Soudal	+ 25"
5	Jan Bakelants (BEL)	Team Sunweb	+ 32"
6	Maurits Lammertink (NED)	Roompot–Charles	+ 39"
7	Jos Van Emden (NED)	Team Jumbo–Visma	+ 43"
8	Jelle Wallays (BEL)	Lotto–Soudal	+ 44"
9	Dylan Groenewegen (NED)	Team Jumbo–Visma	+ 46"
10	Alex Dowsett (GBR)	Team Katusha–Alpecin	+ 48"

=== Points classification ===
Final points classification (1-10)
Rank	Rider	Team	Points
1	Dylan Groenewegen (NED)	Team Jumbo–Visma	40
2	Caleb Ewan (AUS)	Lotto–Soudal	37
3	Mike Teunissen (NED)	Team Jumbo–Visma	25
4	Emīls Liepiņš (LAT)	Wallonie Bruxelles	22
5	Amund Grøndahl Jansen (NOR)	Team Jumbo–Visma	17
6	Jens Debusschere (BEL)	Team Katusha–Alpecin	16
7	Max Walscheid (GER)	Team Sunweb	15
8	Mads Würtz Schmidt (DEN)	Team Katusha–Alpecin	14
9	Boris Vallée (BEL)	Wanty–Gobert	12
10	Bas Van Der Kooij (NED)	Monkey Town Continental Team	10

=== Young rider classification ===
Final young rider classification (1-10)
Rank	Rider	Team	Time
1	Rasmus Byriel Iversen (DEN)	Lotto–Soudal	16h 01' 57"
2	Aaron Van Poucke (BEL)	Sport Vlaanderen–Baloise	+ 9"
3	Lars van den Berg (NED)	Metec–TKH	+ 18"
4	Urko Berrade (ESP)	Euskadi–Murias	+ 29"
5	Dennis van der Horst (NED)	Metec–TKH	+ 5' 39"
6	Aaron Verwilst (BEL)	Sport Vlaanderen–Baloise	+ 5' 47"
7	Adne Koster (NED)	Alecto Cycling Team	+ 5' 49"
8	Florian Stork (GER)	Team Sunweb	+ 5' 54"
9	Wesley Mol (NED)	Team Differdange–Geba	+ 6' 26"
10	Kelland O'Brien (AUS)	Pro Racing Sunshine Coast	+ 7' 04"

=== Teams classification ===
Final teams classification (1-10)
Rank	Team	Time
1	Team Jumbo–Visma	48h 03' 29"
2	Lotto–Soudal	+ 53"
3	Team Katusha–Alpecin	+ 1' 02"
4	Team Sunweb	+ 1' 14"
5	Wallonie Bruxelles	+ 2' 03"
6	Wanty–Gobert	+ 2' 43"
7	Sport Vlaanderen–Baloise	+ 2' 48"
8	Burgos BH	+ 3' 30"
9	Roompot–Charles	+ 6' 52"
10	Monkey Town Continental Team	+ 7' 53"
