= 2019 Four Days of Dunkirk =

2019 UCI Europe Tour

Race details
- Dates: 14–19 May
- Stages: 6
- Distance: 1,055.7 km (656.0 mi)
- Winning time: 25h 37' 41"

Results
| Jersey awarded to the overall winner | Winner | Mike Teunissen (NED) | (Team Jumbo–Visma) |
| | Second | Amund Grøndahl Jansen (NOR) | (Team Jumbo–Visma) |
| | Third | Jens Keukeleire (BEL) | (Lotto–Soudal) |
| Jersey awarded to the points classification winner | Points | Mike Teunissen (NED) | (Team Jumbo–Visma) |
| Jersey awarded to the mountains classification winner | Mountains | Lionel Taminiaux (BEL) | (Wallonie Bruxelles) |
| Jersey awarded to the youth classification winner | Youth | Anthony Turgis (FRA) | (Total Direct Énergie) |

The 2019 Four Days of Dunkirk (French: Quatre Jours de Dunkerque 2019) was the 65th edition of the Four Days of Dunkirk cycling stage race. It started on 14 May in Dunkirk and ended on 19 May again in Dunkirk.

== Teams ==
The start list includes 18 teams (4 UCI WorldTeams, 12 Professional Continental Teams, and 2 Continental Teams).

World Teams

- Lotto–Soudal
- Team Jumbo–Visma
- Groupama–FDJ
- AG2R La Mondiale

Professional Continental teams

- Cofidis
- Corendon–Circus
- Delko–Marseille Provence
- Israel Cycling Academy
- Arkéa–Samsic
- Wallonie Bruxelles
- Roompot–Charles
- Sport Vlaanderen–Baloise
- Euskadi–Murias
- Vital Concept–B&B Hotels
- Wanty–Gobert
- Total Direct Énergie

Continental teams

- Natura4Ever–Roubaix–Lille Métropole
- St. Michel–Auber93

== Route ==
Stage characteristics and winners
| Stage | Date | Course | Distance | Type | Stage winner |
|---|---|---|---|---|---|
| 1 | 14 May | Dunkirk to Condé-sur-l'Escaut | 172.9 km (107.4 mi) | Flat stage | Dylan Groenewegen (NED) |
| 2 | 15 May | Wallers to Saint-Quentin | 177.7 km (110.4 mi) | Hilly stage | Dylan Groenewegen (NED) |
| 3 | 16 May | Laon to Compiègne | 156.5 km (97.2 mi) | Hilly stage | Dylan Groenewegen (NED) |
| 4 | 17 May | Fort-Mahon-Plage to Le Portel | 179.8 km (111.7 mi) | Hilly stage | Bryan Coquard (FRA) |
| 5 | 18 May | Gravelines to Cassel | 181.5 km (112.8 mi) | Hilly stage | Mike Teunissen (NED) |
| 6 | 19 May | Roubaix to Dunkirk | 187.3 km (116.4 mi) | Flat stage | Mike Teunissen (NED) |

== Stages ==
=== Stage 1 ===
14 May 2019 — Dunkirk to Condé-sur-l'Escaut, 172.9 km (107.4 mi)

Result of stage 1
| Rank | Rider | Team | Time |
|---|---|---|---|
| 1 | Dylan Groenewegen (NED) | Team Jumbo–Visma | 4hr 17' 45" |
| 2 | Marc Sarreau (FRA) | Groupama–FDJ | +0" |
| 3 | Mike Teunissen (NED) | Team Jumbo–Visma | +0" |
| 4 | Pierre Barbier (FRA) | Natura4Ever–Roubaix–Lille Métropole | +0" |
| 5 | Emīls Liepiņš (LAT) | Wallonie Bruxelles | +0" |
| 6 | Rudy Barbier (FRA) | Israel Cycling Academy | +0" |
| 7 | Cyril Barthe (FRA) | Euskadi–Murias | +0" |
| 8 | Amund Grøndahl Jansen (NOR) | Team Jumbo–Visma | +0" |
| 9 | Timothy Dupont (BEL) | Wanty–Gobert | +0" |
| 10 | José Daniel Viejo (SPA) | Euskadi–Murias | +0" |
Source: ProCyclingStats

General classification after stage 1
| Rank | Rider | Team | Time |
|---|---|---|---|
| 1 | Dylan Groenewegen (NED) | Team Jumbo–Visma | 4hr 17' 35" |
| 2 | Marc Sarreau (FRA) | Groupama–FDJ | +1" |
| 3 | Elmar Reinders (NED) | Roompot–Charles | +4" |
| 4 | Mike Teunissen (NED) | Team Jumbo–Visma | +6" |
| 5 | Samuel Leroux (FRA) | Natura4Ever–Roubaix–Lille Métropole | +7" |
| 6 | Rudy Barbier (FRA) | Israel Cycling Academy | +8" |
| 7 | Tom Devriendt (BEL) | Wanty–Gobert | +8" |
| 8 | Dries De Bondt (BEL) | Corendon–Circus | +9" |
| 9 | Julien Duval (FRA) | AG2R La Mondiale | +9" |
| 10 | Pierre Barbier (FRA) | Natura4Ever–Roubaix–Lille Métropole | +10" |
Source: ProCyclingStats

=== Stage 2 ===
15 May 2019 — Wallers to Saint-Quentin, 177.7 km (110.4 mi)

Clément Venturini from AG2R La Mondiale crossed the line first, but was relegated by the jury due to an "irregular sprint" in the finale, therefore Dylan Groenewegen, who crossed the line second, is the winner of the stage.

Result of stage 2
| Rank | Rider | Team | Time |
|---|---|---|---|
| 1 | Dylan Groenewegen (NED) | Team Jumbo–Visma | 4hr 08' 33" |
| 2 | Timothy Dupont (BEL) | Wanty–Gobert | +0" |
| 3 | Roy Jans (BEL) | Corendon–Circus | +0" |
| 4 | Tom Van Asbroeck (BEL) | Israel Cycling Academy | +0" |
| 5 | Jens Keukeleire (BEL) | Lotto–Soudal | +0" |
| 6 | Piet Allegaert (BEL) | Sport Vlaanderen–Baloise | +0" |
| 7 | Mike Teunissen (NED) | Team Jumbo–Visma | +0" |
| 8 | Michael Van Staeyen (BEL) | Roompot–Charles | +0" |
| 9 | Pieter Vanspeybrouck (BEL) | Wanty–Gobert | +0" |
| 10 | Pierre Barbier (FRA) | Natura4Ever–Roubaix–Lille Métropole | +0" |
Source: ProCyclingStats

General classification after stage 2
| Rank | Rider | Team | Time |
|---|---|---|---|
| 1 | Dylan Groenewegen (NED) | Team Jumbo–Visma | 8hr 25' 58" |
| 2 | Marc Sarreau (FRA) | Groupama–FDJ | +11" |
| 3 | Lasse Norman Hansen (DEN) | Corendon–Circus | +12" |
| 4 | Timothy Dupont (BEL) | Wanty–Gobert | +14" |
| 5 | Elmar Reinders (NED) | Roompot–Charles | +14" |
| 6 | Mike Teunissen (NED) | Team Jumbo–Visma | +16" |
| 7 | Roy Jans (BEL) | Corendon–Circus | +16" |
| 8 | Samuel Leroux (FRA) | Natura4Ever–Roubaix–Lille Métropole | +17" |
| 9 | Rudy Barbier (FRA) | Israel Cycling Academy | +18" |
| 10 | Dries De Bondt (BEL) | Corendon–Circus | +19" |
Source: ProCyclingStats

=== Stage 3 ===
16 May 2019 — Laon to Compiègne, 156.5 km (97.2 mi)

Clément Venturini from AG2R La Mondiale crossed the line fourth, but was again relegated by the jury due to an "irregular sprint" in the finale, therefore taking 16th place.

Result of stage 3
| Rank | Rider | Team | Time |
|---|---|---|---|
| 1 | Dylan Groenewegen (NED) | Team Jumbo–Visma | 4hr 08' 33" |
| 2 | Marc Sarreau (FRA) | Groupama–FDJ | +0" |
| 3 | Christophe Laporte (FRA) | Cofidis | +0" |
| 4 | Roy Jans (BEL) | Corendon–Circus | +0" |
| 5 | Timothy Dupont (BEL) | Wanty–Gobert | +0" |
| 6 | Aksel Nõmmela (EST) | Wallonie Bruxelles | +0" |
| 7 | Kevyn Ista (BEL) | Wallonie Bruxelles | +0" |
| 8 | Tom Van Asbroeck (BEL) | Israel Cycling Academy | +0" |
| 9 | Jens Keukeleire (BEL) | Lotto–Soudal | +0" |
| 10 | Michael Van Staeyen (BEL) | Roompot–Charles | +0" |
Source: ProCyclingStats

General classification after stage 3
| Rank | Rider | Team | Time |
|---|---|---|---|
| 1 | Dylan Groenewegen (NED) | Team Jumbo–Visma | 11hr 59' 42" |
| 2 | Marc Sarreau (FRA) | Groupama–FDJ | +15" |
| 3 | Timothy Dupont (BEL) | Wanty–Gobert | +24" |
| 4 | Mike Teunissen (NED) | Team Jumbo–Visma | +26" |
| 5 | Jens Keukeleire (BEL) | Lotto–Soudal | +26" |
| 6 | Roy Jans (BEL) | Corendon–Circus | +26" |
| 7 | Christophe Laporte (FRA) | Cofidis | +26" |
| 8 | Anthony Turgis (FRA) | Total Direct Énergie | +27" |
| 9 | Lasse Norman Hansen (DEN) | Corendon–Circus | +28" |
| 10 | Elmar Reinders (NED) | Roompot–Charles | +29" |
Source: ProCyclingStats

=== Stage 4 ===
17 May 2019 — Fort-Mahon-Plage to Le Portel, 179.8 km (111.7 mi)

Result of stage 4
| Rank | Rider | Team | Time |
|---|---|---|---|
| 1 | Bryan Coquard (FRA) | Vital Concept–B&B Hotels | 4hr 37' 19" |
| 2 | Clément Venturini (FRA) | AG2R La Mondiale | +0" |
| 3 | Mike Teunissen (NED) | Team Jumbo–Visma | +0" |
| 4 | Tom Van Asbroeck (BEL) | Israel Cycling Academy | +0" |
| 5 | Jens Keukeleire (BEL) | Lotto–Soudal | +0" |
| 6 | Dimitri Claeys (BEL) | Cofidis | +0" |
| 7 | Aimé De Gendt (BEL) | Wanty–Gobert | +0" |
| 8 | Julien Antomarchi (FRA) | Natura4Ever–Roubaix–Lille Métropole | +0" |
| 9 | Piet Allegaert (BEL) | Sport Vlaanderen–Baloise | +0" |
| 10 | Anthony Delaplace (FRA) | Arkéa–Samsic | +0" |
Source: ProCyclingStats

General classification after stage 4
| Rank | Rider | Team | Time |
|---|---|---|---|
| 1 | Mike Teunissen (NED) | Team Jumbo–Visma | 16hr 37' 23" |
| 2 | Jens Keukeleire (BEL) | Lotto–Soudal | +4" |
| 3 | Anthony Turgis (FRA) | Total Direct Énergie | +5" |
| 4 | Tom Van Asbroeck (BEL) | Israel Cycling Academy | +8" |
| 5 | Amund Grøndahl Jansen (NOR) | Team Jumbo–Visma | +8" |
| 6 | Marc Sarreau (FRA) | Groupama–FDJ | +12" |
| 7 | Piet Allegaert (BEL) | Sport Vlaanderen–Baloise | +14" |
| 8 | Anthony Delaplace (FRA) | Arkéa–Samsic | +14" |
| 9 | Aimé De Gendt (BEL) | Wanty–Gobert | +14" |
| 10 | Héctor Sáez (SPA) | Euskadi–Murias | +14" |
Source: ProCyclingStats

=== Stage 5 ===
18 May 2019 — Gravelines to Cassel, Nord, 181.5 km (112.8 mi)

Result of stage 5
| Rank | Rider | Team | Time |
|---|---|---|---|
| 1 | Mike Teunissen (NED) | Team Jumbo–Visma | 4hr 38' 56" |
| 2 | Clément Venturini (FRA) | AG2R La Mondiale | +0" |
| 3 | Amund Grøndahl Jansen (NOR) | Team Jumbo–Visma | +0" |
| 4 | Jens Keukeleire (BEL) | Lotto–Soudal | +8" |
| 5 | Aimé De Gendt (BEL) | Wanty–Gobert | +8" |
| 6 | Anthony Turgis (FRA) | Total Direct Énergie | +11" |
| 7 | Dimitri Claeys (BEL) | Cofidis | +11" |
| 8 | Anthony Delaplace (FRA) | Arkéa–Samsic | +11" |
| 9 | Tom Van Asbroeck (BEL) | Israel Cycling Academy | +11" |
| 10 | Julien Antomarchi (FRA) | Natura4Ever–Roubaix–Lille Métropole | +11" |
Source: ProCyclingStats

General classification after stage 5
| Rank | Rider | Team | Time |
|---|---|---|---|
| 1 | Mike Teunissen (NED) | Team Jumbo–Visma | 21hr 16' 09" |
| 2 | Amund Grøndahl Jansen (NOR) | Team Jumbo–Visma | +14" |
| 3 | Jens Keukeleire (BEL) | Lotto–Soudal | +22" |
| 4 | Anthony Turgis (FRA) | Total Direct Énergie | +26" |
| 5 | Tom Van Asbroeck (BEL) | Israel Cycling Academy | +29" |
| 6 | Aimé De Gendt (BEL) | Wanty–Gobert | +32" |
| 7 | Anthony Delaplace (FRA) | Arkéa–Samsic | +35" |
| 8 | Dimitri Claeys (BEL) | Cofidis | +35" |
| 9 | Julien Antomarchi (FRA) | Natura4Ever–Roubaix–Lille Métropole | +35" |
| 10 | Frederik Backaert (BEL) | Wanty–Gobert | +52" |
Source: ProCyclingStats

=== Stage 6 ===
19 May 2019 — Roubaix to Dunkirk, 187.3 km (116.4 mi)

Result of stage 6
| Rank | Rider | Team | Time |
|---|---|---|---|
| 1 | Mike Teunissen (NED) | Team Jumbo–Visma | 4hr 21' 42" |
| 2 | Dylan Groenewegen (NED) | Team Jumbo–Visma | +0" |
| 3 | Timothy Dupont (BEL) | Wanty–Gobert | +0" |
| 4 | Marc Sarreau (FRA) | Groupama–FDJ | +0" |
| 5 | Bryan Coquard (FRA) | Vital Concept–B&B Hotels | +0" |
| 6 | Enzo Wouters (BEL) | Lotto–Soudal | +0" |
| 7 | Tom Van Asbroeck (BEL) | Israel Cycling Academy | +0" |
| 8 | Kevyn Ista (BEL) | Wallonie Bruxelles | +0" |
| 9 | Emiel Vermeulen (BEL) | Natura4Ever–Roubaix–Lille Métropole | +0" |
| 10 | Jens Keukeleire (BEL) | Lotto–Soudal | +0" |
Source: ProCyclingStats

General classification after stage 6
| Rank | Rider | Team | Time |
|---|---|---|---|
| 1 | Mike Teunissen (NED) | Team Jumbo–Visma | 25hr 37' 41" |
| 2 | Amund Grøndahl Jansen (NOR) | Team Jumbo–Visma | +24" |
| 3 | Jens Keukeleire (BEL) | Lotto–Soudal | +32" |
| 4 | Anthony Turgis (FRA) | Total Direct Énergie | +36" |
| 5 | Tom Van Asbroeck (BEL) | Israel Cycling Academy | +39" |
| 6 | Aimé De Gendt (BEL) | Wanty–Gobert | +42" |
| 7 | Anthony Delaplace (FRA) | Arkéa–Samsic | +45" |
| 8 | Dimitri Claeys (BEL) | Cofidis | +45" |
| 9 | Julien Antomarchi (FRA) | Natura4Ever–Roubaix–Lille Métropole | +45" |
| 10 | Frederik Backaert (BEL) | Wanty–Gobert | +1' 02" |
Source: ProCyclingStats

== Classification leadership table ==
| Stage | Winner | General classification | Mountains classification | Points classification | Young rider classification | Teams classification |
|---|---|---|---|---|---|---|
| 1 | Dylan Groenewegen | Dylan Groenewegen | Tom Devriendt | Dylan Groenewegen | Samuel Leroux | Team Jumbo–Visma |
| 2 | Dylan Groenewegen | Dylan Groenewegen | Tom Devriendt | Dylan Groenewegen | Samuel Leroux | Team Jumbo–Visma |
| 3 | Dylan Groenewegen | Dylan Groenewegen | Tom Devriendt | Dylan Groenewegen | Anthony Turgis | Team Jumbo–Visma |
| 4 | Bryan Coquard | Mike Teunissen | Tom Devriendt | Dylan Groenewegen | Anthony Turgis | Team Jumbo–Visma |
| 5 | Mike Teunissen | Mike Teunissen | Lionel Taminiaux | Mike Teunissen | Anthony Turgis | Arkéa–Samsic |
| 6 | Mike Teunissen | Mike Teunissen | Lionel Taminiaux | Mike Teunissen | Anthony Turgis | Arkéa–Samsic |
| Final | | Mike Teunissen | Lionel Taminiaux | Mike Teunissen | Anthony Turgis | Arkéa–Samsic |
