= 2012 UCI Road World Championships – Men's under-23 road race =

Men's under-23 road race
2012 UCI Road World Championships

Race details
- Dates: 22 September 2012
- Stages: 1

The Men's under-23 road race of the 2012 UCI Road World Championships was a cycling event that took place on 22 September 2012 in Limburg, the Netherlands.

== Final classification ==
	Cyclist	Nation		Time
1	Alexey Lutsenko	Kazakhstan	en	4h 20' 15"
2	Bryan Coquard	France	+	s.t.
3	Tom Van Asbroeck	Belgium		s.t.
4	Hugo Houle	Canada		s.t.
5	Luka Pibernik	Slovenia		s.t.
6	Esteban Chaves	Colombia		s.t.
7	Hernando Bohórquez	Colombia		s.t.
8	Kenneth Vanbilsen	Belgium		s.t.
9	Wouter Wippert	Netherlands		s.t.
10	Sam Bennett	Ireland		s.t.
