= Bryan Coquard =

French cyclist (born 1992)

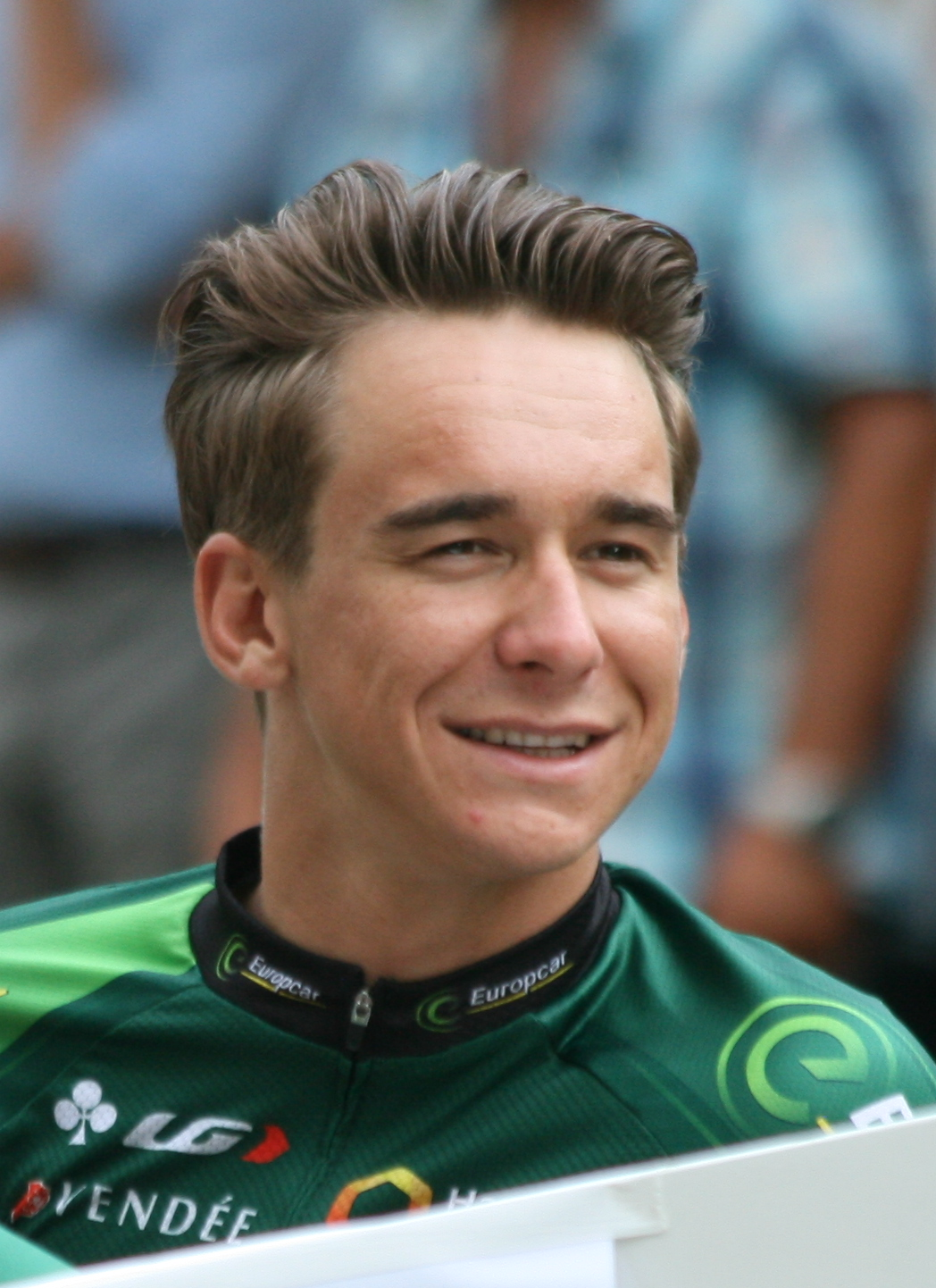
- Coquard at the 2015 Tour de France

Personal information
- Full name: Bryan Coquard
- Nickname: Le Coq (The Rooster)
- Born: 25 April 1992 (age 34) Saint-Nazaire, France
- Height: 1.69 m (5 ft 7 in)
- Weight: 60 kg (132 lb; 9 st 6 lb)

Cycling career
- Sport: Cycling
- Current team: Cofidis
- Disciplines: Road; Track
- Role: Rider
- Rider type: Sprinter (road); Endurance (track)

Amateur teams
- 2008–2010: US Pontchâtelaine
- 2011–2012: Vendée U

Professional teams
- 2013–2017: Team Europcar
- 2018–2021: Vital Concept
- 2022–: Cofidis

Major wins
- Road Grand Tours Vuelta a España 1 individual stage (2026) Stage races Four Days of Dunkirk (2016) Track World Championships Madison (2015)
Medal record
Representing France
Men's track cycling
Olympic Games
Silver medal – second place	2012 London	Omnium
World Championships
Gold medal – first place	2015 Yvelines	Madison
European Championships
Gold medal – first place	2015 Grenchen	Elimination
Gold medal – first place	2019 Apeldoorn	Points race
Silver medal – second place	2011 Apeldoorn	Omnium
Silver medal – second place	2019 Apeldoorn	Elimination
Bronze medal – third place	2015 Grenchen	Madison
Men's road bicycle racing
World Championships
Silver medal – second place	2012 Valkenburg	Under-23 road race
Silver medal – second place	2023 Glasgow	Mixed team relay

Bryan Coquard (born 25 April 1992) is a French cyclist, who rides for UCI WorldTeam Cofidis.

Since turning professional, Coquard has taken more than fifty victories in road racing, primarily in French races – including six stage wins and an overall victory at the Four Days of Dunkirk, nine stage wins at the Étoile de Bessèges, and a joint-record two victories at the Route Adélie de Vitré one-day race. He has also competed professionally in track cycling – having won a silver medal at the 2012 Summer Olympics in the omnium, the world title in the madison at the 2015 UCI Track Cycling World Championships, and five medals (two gold) at the UEC European Track Championships.

== Career ==
=== Youth and amateur career ===
Born in Saint-Nazaire, Coquard began cycling in 1999 at the age of seven, at the US Pontchâteau club. In September 2008, aged sixteen, he joined CREPS Bordeaux, where he was coached by Éric Vermeulen. In 2009, Coquard won the gold medal in the omnium at the UCI Junior World Championships, as well as winning the scratch at the UEC European Junior Championships.

He retained his Junior omnium crown in 2010, winning four of the six events, and he won a second medal with silver in the scratch race. Having also finished second in the junior road race at the 2010 European Road Championships, Coquard signed with amateur team Vendée U – the feeder team for Team Europcar – for the 2011 season. In 2011, Coquard won his first senior titles at the French National Track Championships, in the team pursuit and scratch races, and he won a silver medal in the omnium at the UEC European Track Championships.

The following year at the French National Track Championships, Coquard won the omnium – winning 5 of the 6 races within – and madison titles, winning the latter with Morgan Lamoisson. He was selected to represent France in the omnium at the 2012 Summer Olympics, and won the silver medal behind Lasse Norman Hansen of Denmark. On the road, Coquard won a stage of the Tour de Berlin, and won a silver medal in the under-23 road race at the UCI Road World Championships, missing out to Alexey Lutsenko in a group sprint.

=== Team Europcar (2013–2017) ===
Coquard signed a contract for a professional career on the roads from the 2013 season onwards, signing with Team Europcar.

==== 2013–2015 ====
His 2013 campaign began well, as he took two stages and the points classification in the Étoile de Bessèges in January and February. He then contested the Tour de Langkawi, where he also won two stages – this time consecutively on stages eight and nine. Coquard then recorded second-place finishes at the Val d'Ille Classic in March, the Grand Prix de Denain in April, and the Tour de Picardie in May, also winning a stage. He competed at the UEC European Under-23 Track Championships in Portugal, where he won three medals – silver medals in the scratch and the team pursuit, and a gold medal in the madison with Thomas Boudat. At August's Châteauroux Classic, Coquard won the race in a sprint finish, and the following month, he finished third at the Grand Prix de Fourmies.

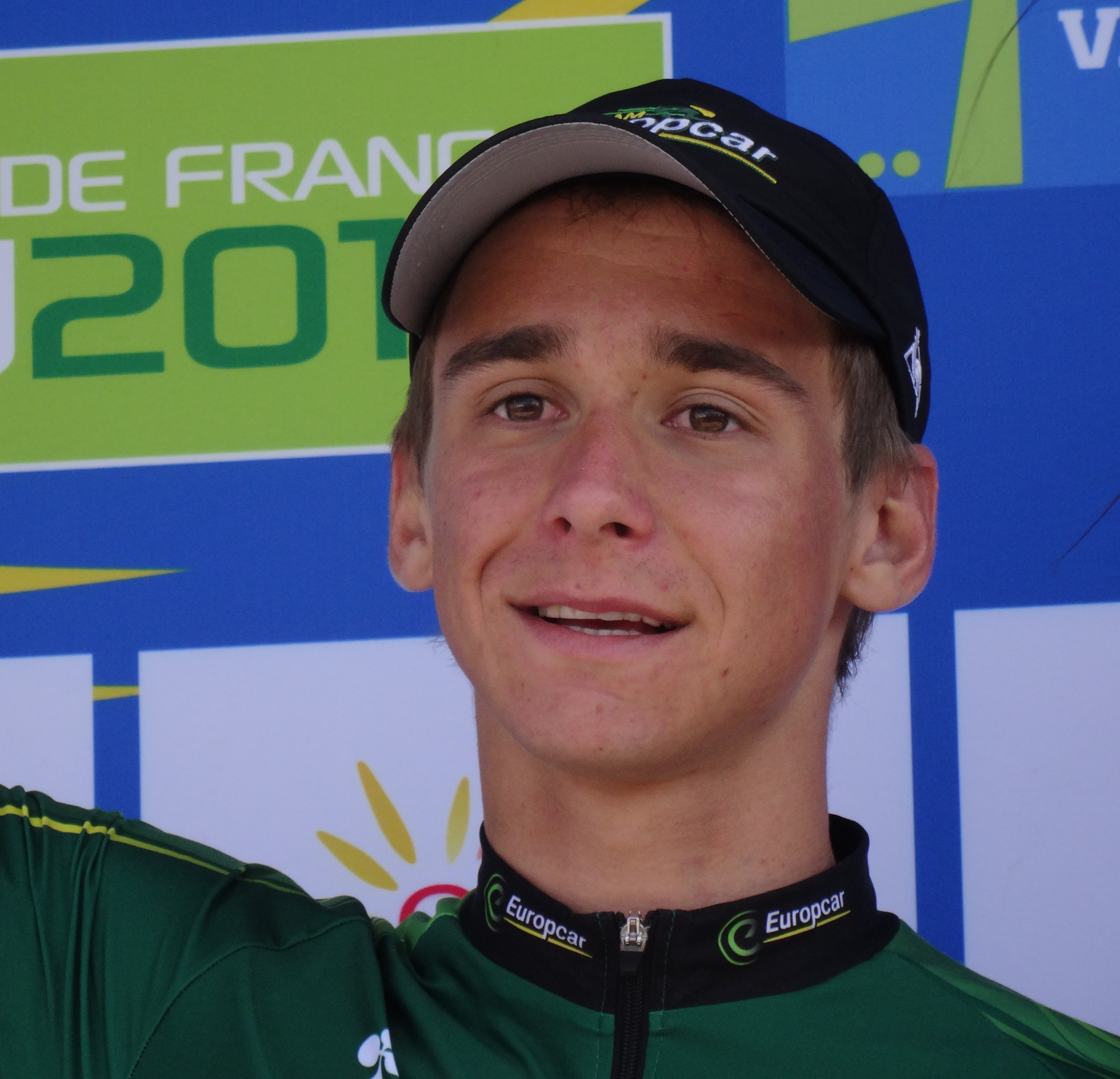
Coquard at the 2014 Grand Prix de Denain

At the start of 2014, Coquard again won two stages at February's Étoile de Bessèges, but did not take another win until the Route Adélie de Vitré in April. He then won the Paris–Camembert in a sprint finish, before taking his fifth victory of the season on the opening day of the Tour de Picardie. Having lost the race lead the following day, Coquard ultimately finished the race in third place overall. He made his Tour de France début, finishing fourth on the first stage into Harrogate, avoiding a crash in the final sprint. He recorded a total of seven top-ten stage finishes as he finished the race in third place in the points classification, losing second to Alexander Kristoff on the final stage.

Coquard took his first victory of the 2015 season at the Étoile de Bessèges in February, where he won stage three. Later in the month, Coquard won his first elite world title, when he won the madison at the UCI Track Cycling World Championships with Morgan Kneisky on home soil at the Vélodrome National. In May, Coquard won the first stage of the Four Days of Dunkirk, which featured cobbled sectors, fracturing the peloton to bits, and Coquard won the sprint of a small group of three. He lost the race lead on the penultimate stage to Ignatas Konovalovas, having lost 38 seconds on the day; Konovalovas ultimately won the race by 14 seconds from Coquard, but Coquard won the points and young rider classifications. The following month, Coquard won two stages and the points classification at the Route du Sud, before he contested the Tour de France – his best stage result was second on the final stage into Paris. Following the conclusion of his road campaign, Coquard won two titles at the French National Track Championships, and two medals at the UEC European Track Championships – gold in the inaugural stand-alone elimination race and bronze in the madison with Kneisky.

==== 2016 ====
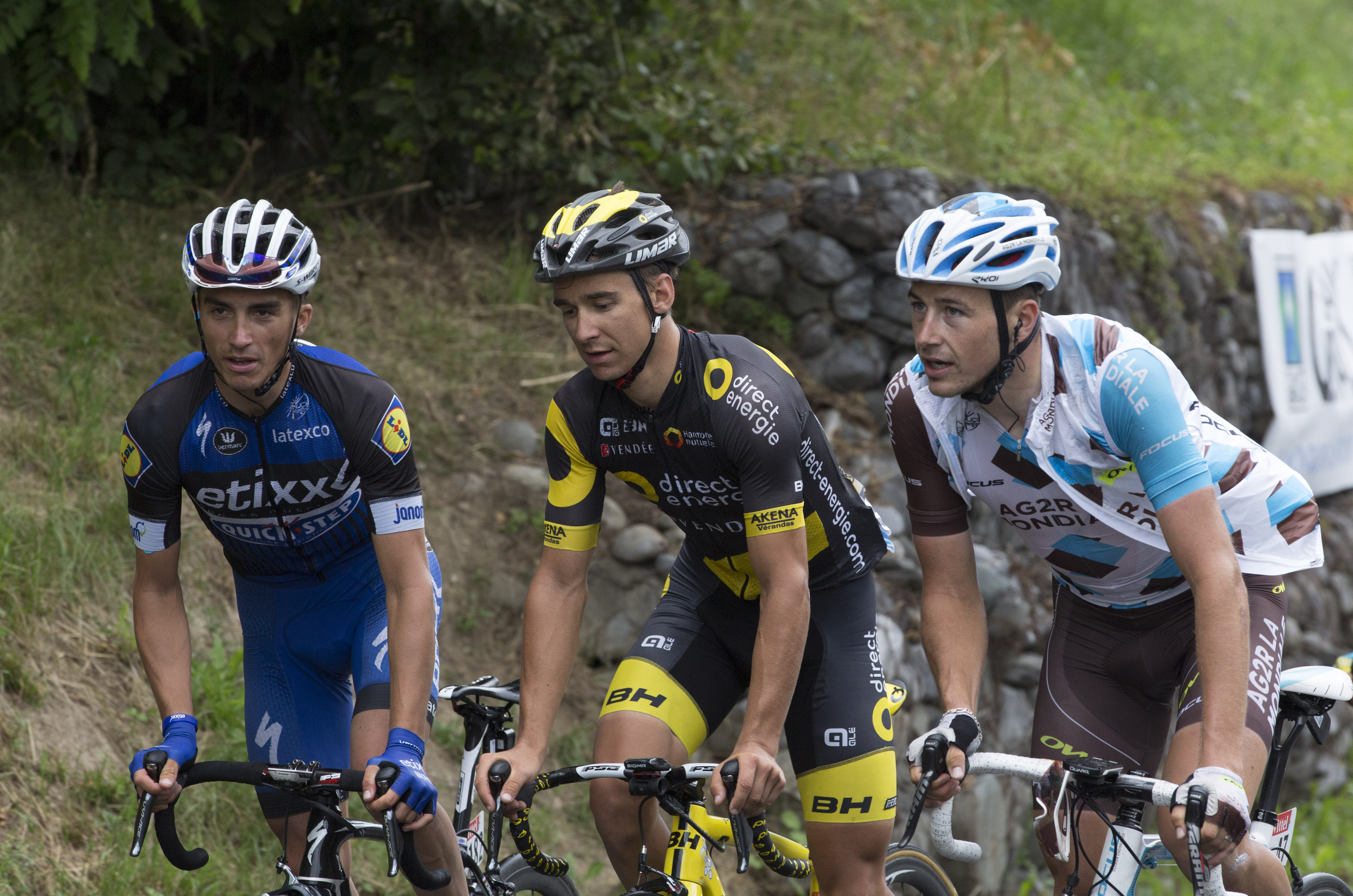
Coquard (centre) at the 2016 Tour de France, along with compatriots Julian Alaphilippe (left) and Alexis Gougeard (right)

Coquard began the 2016 season with consecutive victories in the first two stages of the Étoile de Bessèges, ultimately winning the race's points classification. However in mid-February, while preparing for the Vuelta a Andalucía, he fractured his right shoulder blade in a training accident in Spain. He returned to racing a month later, losing a victory to Jens Debusschere in a small bunch sprint at Dwars door Vlaanderen, having celebrated too early. At the start of April, Coquard won the Route Adélie de Vitré for the second time in three years – as a result, becoming only the second rider after Jaan Kirsipuu to win the race more than once. After a stage win at the Circuit de la Sarthe, his form continued into the hilly classics of Brabantse Pijl and the Amstel Gold Race, finishing fourth in both.

In May, he won his first professional stage race at the Four Days of Dunkirk; he won the first three stages, finished second in the remaining two, and won the points and young rider classifications as well. He won another French stage race the following month, when he won the Boucles de la Mayenne; he won two stages, including a victory in the prologue individual time trial, and the points classification. In his build up to the Tour de France, he won the first two stages of the Route du Sud, but failed to finish the race. At the Tour de France, his best stage result was a second-place finish to Marcel Kittel in Limoges on stage four. He took two further podium finishes over the remainder of the season, with third-place finishes at the Grand Prix de Fourmies and the Tour de Vendée.

==== 2017 ====
In February, Coquard won a stage at both the Volta a la Comunitat Valenciana – a weather-effected stage which was reduced to approximately 50 kilometres (31 miles) in length – and the Vuelta a Andalucía. Two more stage wins followed for Coquard at the Circuit de la Sarthe, where he also won the points classification. The following month, it was announced that Coquard would be leaving Direct Énergie at the end of the 2017 season. When celebrating his victory in the opening stage of the Tour of Belgium, Coquard made a gesture aimed at his general manager Jean-René Bernaudeau in the hopes that he would ride the Tour de France with the team. Ultimately, Bernaudeau did not pick Coquard for the race, a decision that left Coquard "very disappointed". He took no further victories during the season, his best result being a second-place stage finish on the final stage of the Tour de Wallonie, leading home the peloton five seconds behind Dylan Teuns.

=== Vital Concept (2018–2021) ===
In August 2017, it was confirmed that Coquard had signed for the newly formed Vital Concept team as team leader for 2018. Coquard was also offered a place on the Quick-Step Floors team, but turned it down as he felt he would be put as second sprinter behind Fernando Gaviria, who had won the points classification at the Giro d'Italia earlier in the year.

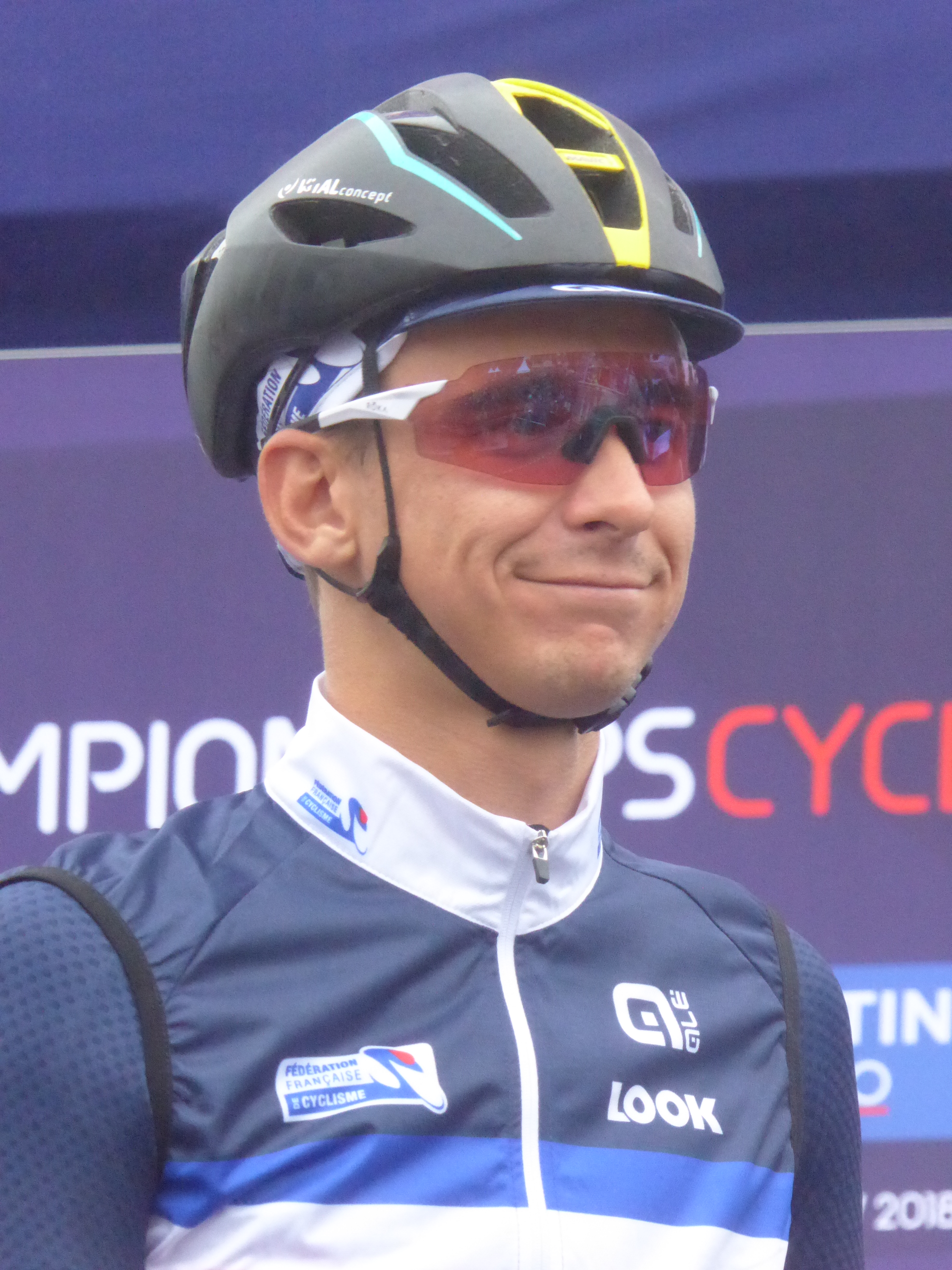
Coquard at the 2018 European Road Cycling Championships

Coquard made his debut for Vital Concept in January at the Sharjah International Cycling Tour. He took his first victory in February during the opening stage of the Tour of Oman where he won a sprint finish ahead of Mark Cavendish. Earlier in the month, Coquard narrowly missed out on victory at the Étoile de Bessèges, when Christophe Laporte passed him at the finish line of the second stage while Coquard celebrated an anticipated win too early. He went winless until May's Four Days of Dunkirk, where he won the fourth stage of the race, before withdrawing ahead of the final stage. He won the final stage of the Tour of Belgium, moving up to seventh place in the final general classification standings. He took no further victories during the year, the best result being a runner-up finish at Paris–Bourges to Valentin Madouas.

Coquard started the 2019 season with a victory on his first day of racing, winning the opening stage of the Étoile de Bessèges. Having placed second to Marc Sarreau at Cholet-Pays de la Loire, Coquard won a stage and the points classification at April's Circuit de la Sarthe. He followed this up with a stage win at the Four Days of Dunkirk, and then victory at the Grote Prijs Marcel Kint, his first one-day victory since 2016. He finished third overall at the Boucles de la Mayenne, moving into a podium position as a result of bonus seconds earned with his victory on the final stage, before winning the final stage of the Tour of Belgium. In the second half of the year, Coquard won the Grand Prix Pino Cerami, the points classification at the Tour de Wallonie, and the second stage of the Arctic Race of Norway. At the end of the road season, Coquard then contested a track campaign, winning two medals at the UEC European Track Championships – a gold in the points race and a silver to Elia Viviani in the elimination race. He also won a silver medal in the opening round of the 2019–20 UCI Track Cycling World Cup in Minsk, in the madison with Benjamin Thomas.

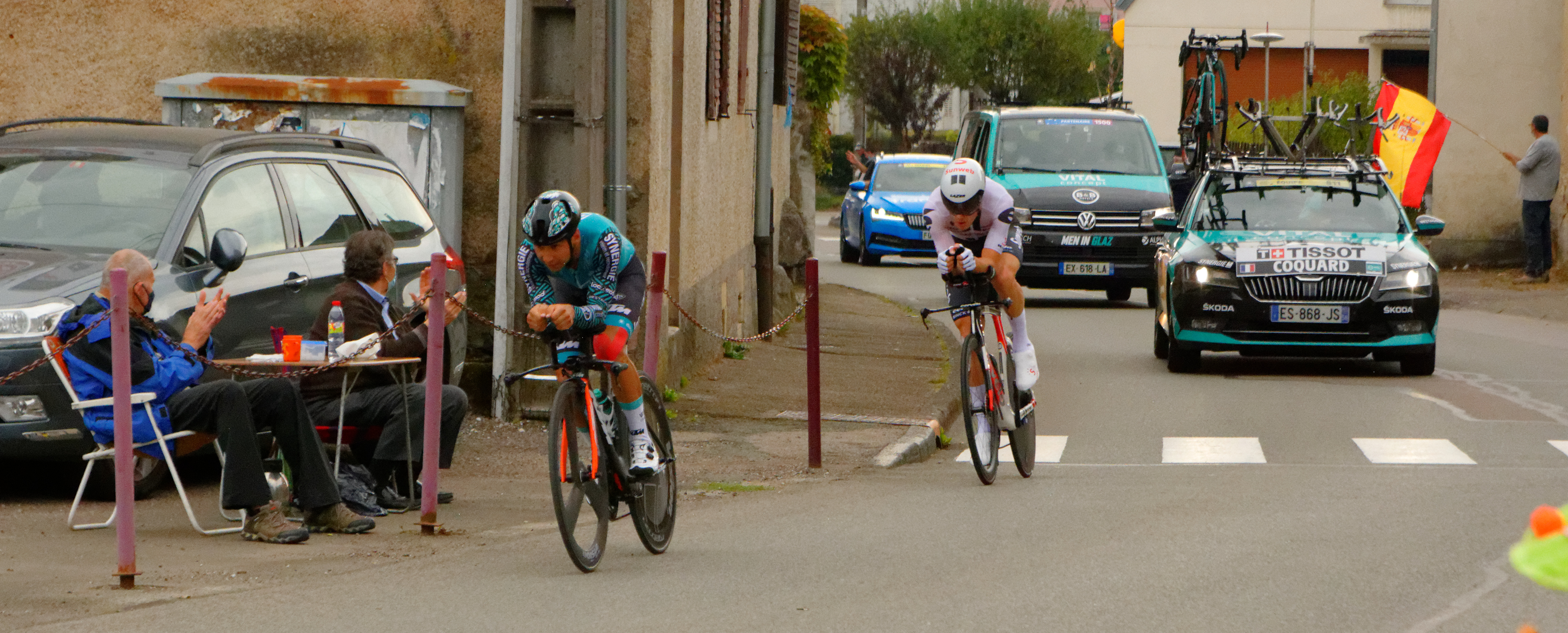
Coquard leading Nikias Arndt during the stage 20 individual time trial at the 2020 Tour de France

In an abbreviated 2020 season largely disrupted by the COVID-19 pandemic, Coquard's only victory came at the Route d'Occitanie, where he won the opening stage; he also finished second to Arnaud Démare at the French National Road Race Championships, and third at the Scheldeprijs. The following year, in what would turn out to be his final season with B&B Hotels p/b KTM, Coquard went winless throughout the year for the first time since turning professional. Having finished third in his season-opening race at the Grand Prix La Marseillaise in January, Coquard did not improve on this individual result until his penultimate race of the season, where he finished second to Arne Marit at the Grand Prix du Morbihan in October.

=== Cofidis (2022–present) ===
In August 2021, Coquard signed an initial two-year contract with Cofidis, from the 2022 season.

Coquard ended his 18-month winless streak when he won the second stage of the Étoile de Bessèges in February, winning an uphill sprint in Rousson ahead of Mads Pedersen. He also won the second stage at his next start, the Tour de la Provence, but he failed to start the following stage. He recorded a second-place finish at La Roue Tourangelle in March, losing out to Nacer Bouhanni in the sprint. Having only previously contested the Tour de France at Grand Tour level, Coquard rode the Vuelta a España for the first time; his best stage result was a second-place finish on stage thirteen, losing out to Pedersen in the sprint. Towards the end of the season, Coquard won the Tour de Vendée and finished third at Paris–Bourges.

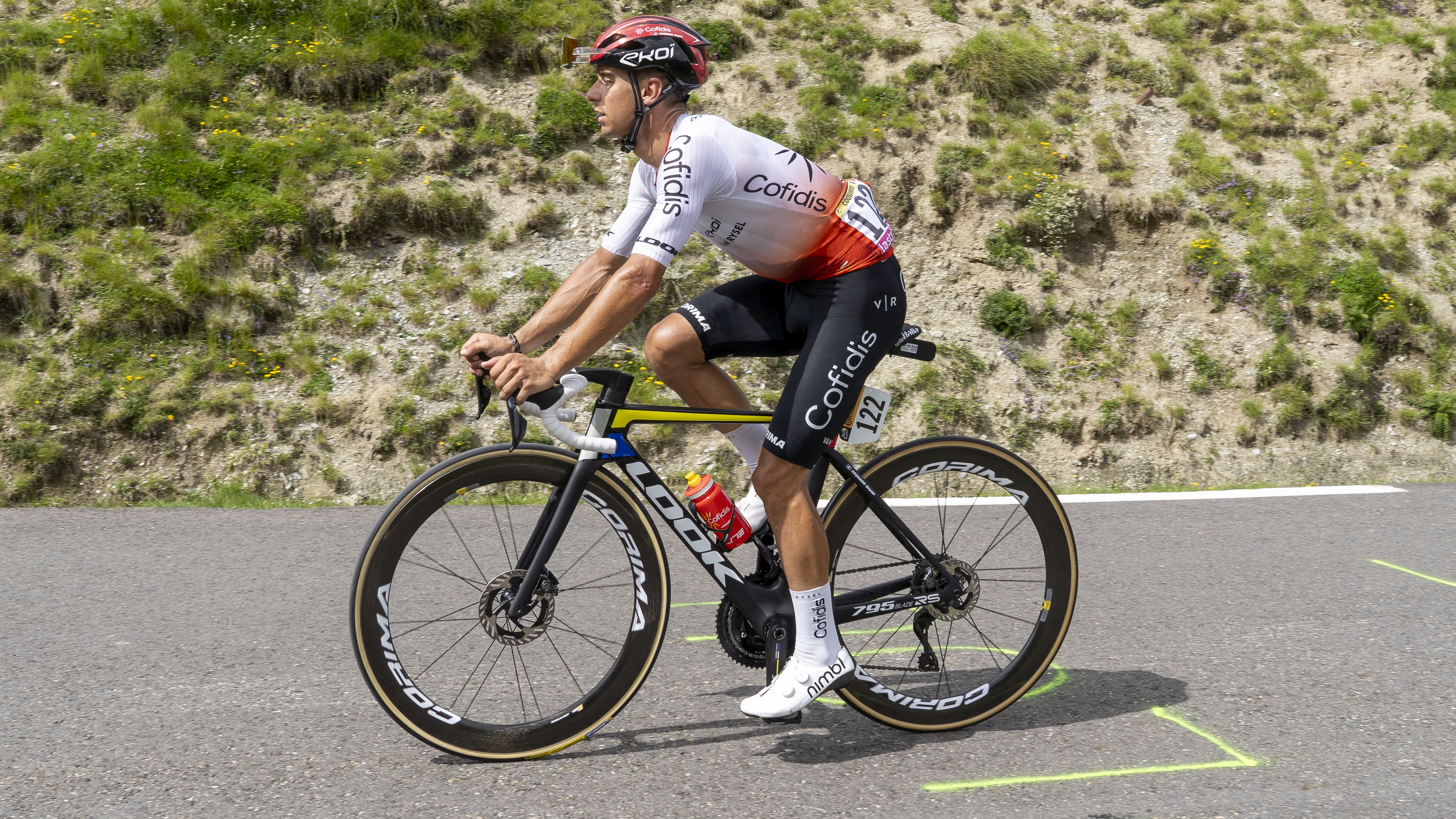
Coquard at the 2023 Tour de France

Coquard's 2023 season commenced in Australia, where he won the fourth stage of the Tour Down Under, which was his first victory on the UCI World Tour. After two second-place stage finishes at the Volta a Catalunya – losing out to Kaden Groves on both occasions – Coquard took two stage victories at the Région Pays de la Loire Tour, the first of which was his 50th professional road victory. He took no further victories during the campaign, but was a part of the French team that won a silver medal in the mixed team relay at the UCI Road World Championships in Glasgow, missing the gold medal by seven seconds. During the season, he extended his contract with Cofidis by a further two years, until the end of the 2025 season.

Coquard began the 2024 season with a second-place finish at the Clàssica Comunitat Valenciana 1969, missing out to Dylan Groenewegen in the final sprint. At the AlUla Tour, Coquard thought that he had won the fourth stage of the race, but was unable to get ahead of Tim Merlier before the finish line, who won by a narrow margin.

== Major results ==
=== Road ===
2010
2nd Road race, UEC European Junior Championships
2nd La Bernaudeau Junior
2012
1st Grand Prix Cristal Energie
1st Stage 5 Tour de Berlin
2nd Road race, UCI World Under-23 Championships
2013 (6 pro wins)
1st Châteauroux Classic
Étoile de Bessèges

1st Points classification
1st Stages 2 & 4

Tour de Langkawi

1st Stages 8 & 9

2nd Overall French Cup

1st Young rider classification

2nd Overall Tour de Picardie

1st Stage 2

2nd Val d'Ille Classic
2nd Grand Prix de Denain
3rd Grand Prix de Fourmies
5th Paris–Camembert
5th Boucles de l'Aulne
6th Tour de Vendée
8th Grand Prix d'Isbergues
2014 (5)
1st Route Adélie de Vitré
1st Paris–Camembert
Étoile de Bessèges

1st Stages 3 & 4

3rd Overall Tour de Picardie

1st Stage 1

2015 (4)
Route du Sud

1st Points classification
1st Stages 2 & 4

1st Stage 3 Étoile de Bessèges
2nd Overall Four Days of Dunkirk

1st Points classification
1st Young rider classification
1st Stage 1

4th Overall Tour de Picardie
4th Grand Prix de Plumelec-Morbihan
4th Brussels Cycling Classic
5th Trofeo Playa de Palma
5th Grand Prix de la Somme
9th Trofeo Santanyi-Ses Salines-Campos
10th Grand Prix de Denain
2016 (13)
1st Overall Four Days of Dunkirk

1st Points classification
1st Young rider classification
1st Stages 1, 2 & 3

1st Overall Boucles de la Mayenne

1st Points classification
1st Prologue & Stage 2

1st Route Adélie de Vitré
Étoile de Bessèges

1st Points classification
1st Stages 1 & 2

Route du Sud

1st Stages 1 & 2

1st Stage 2a Circuit de la Sarthe
2nd Dwars door Vlaanderen
3rd Grand Prix de Fourmies
3rd Tour de Vendée
4th Brabantse Pijl
4th Clásica de Almería
4th Amstel Gold Race
5th Paris–Tours
6th Grand Prix d'Isbergues
2017 (5)
Circuit de la Sarthe

1st Points classification
1st Stages 2a & 4

1st Stage 4 Vuelta a Andalucía
1st Stage 5 Volta a la Comunitat Valenciana
1st Stage 1 Tour of Belgium
2018 (3)
1st Stage 1 Tour of Oman
1st Stage 4 Four Days of Dunkirk
2nd Paris–Bourges
7th Overall Sharjah International Cycling Tour
7th Overall Tour of Belgium

1st Stage 5

2019 (8)
1st Grand Prix Pino Cerami
1st Grote Prijs Marcel Kint
1st Points classification, Tour de Wallonie
Circuit de la Sarthe

1st Points classification
1st Stage 2

1st Stage 1 Étoile de Bessèges
1st Stage 2 Arctic Race of Norway
1st Stage 4 Four Days of Dunkirk
2nd Cholet-Pays de la Loire
3rd Overall Boucles de la Mayenne

1st Stage 3

3rd Tour de Vendée
5th Grand Prix de Plumelec-Morbihan
5th Grand Prix d'Isbergues
6th La Roue Tourangelle
7th Overall Tour of Belgium

1st Stage 5

8th Paris–Chauny
2020 (1)
1st Stage 1 Route d'Occitanie
2nd Road race, National Championships
3rd Scheldeprijs
2021
2nd Grand Prix du Morbihan
3rd Grand Prix La Marseillaise
4th Overall Boucles de la Mayenne
5th Paris–Bourges
6th Paris–Tours
2022 (3)
1st Tour de Vendée
1st Stage 2 Tour de la Provence
1st Stage 2 Étoile de Bessèges
2nd La Roue Tourangelle
3rd Paris–Bourges
6th Grand Prix La Marseillaise
7th Omloop van het Houtland
10th Circuit Franco-Belge
2023 (3)
2nd Team relay, UCI World Championships
4th Kampioenschap van Vlaanderen
4th Tour de Vendée
5th Paris–Chauny
5th Route Adélie de Vitré
7th Overall Région Pays de la Loire Tour

1st Stages 1 & 3

8th Paris–Bourges
9th Down Under Classic
10th Overall Tour Down Under

1st Stage 4

2024 (1)
1st Stage 2 Tour de Suisse
2nd Clàssica Comunitat Valenciana 1969
4th Muscat Classic
7th Overall AlUla Tour
10th Gran Premio Castellón
2025 (1)
1st Stage 4 Tour Down Under
2nd La Roue Tourangelle
5th Classique Dunkerque
6th Surf Coast Classic
10th Route Adélie de Vitré
2026 (3)
1st Grand Prix La Marseillaise
1st Visit South Aegean Islands
1st Stage 8 Vuelta a España
4th La Roue Tourangelle
7th Tour de Vendée
8th Paris–Camembert

==== Grand Tour general classification results timeline ====
Grand Tour	2014	2015	2016	2017	2018	2019	2020	2021	2022	2023	2024	2025	2026
Giro d'Italia	Has not contested during his career												
Tour de France	104	110	113	—	—	—	122	DNF	—	98	104	DNF	—
Vuelta a España	—	—	—	—	—	—	—	—	DNF	DNF	DNF	136	

Legend
—	Did not compete
DNF	Did not finish

=== Track ===
2009
1st Omnium, UCI World Junior Championships
UEC European Junior Championships

1st Scratch
3rd Team pursuit

2010
UCI World Junior Championships

1st Omnium
2nd Scratch

National Junior Championships

1st Individual pursuit
2nd Madison (with Jauffrey Betouigt-Suire)

2nd Omnium, National Championships
UEC European Junior Championships

3rd Madison (with Romain Le Roux)
3rd Scratch
3rd Team pursuit

2011
National Championships

1st Team pursuit
1st Scratch
2nd Madison (with Morgan Lamoisson)

2nd Omnium, UEC European Championships
3rd Omnium, UCI World Cup, Cali
2012
National Championships

1st Omnium
1st Madison (with Morgan Lamoisson)
3rd Scratch

2nd Omnium, Olympic Games
UEC European Under-23 Championships

2nd Omnium
2nd Points race

2nd UCI World Cup, Beijing
2nd Six Days of Grenoble (with Morgan Kneisky)
2013
UEC European Under-23 Championships

1st Madison (with Thomas Boudat)
2nd Scratch
2nd Team pursuit

2015
1st Madison, UCI World Championships (with Morgan Kneisky)
UEC European Championships

1st Elimination
3rd Madison (with Morgan Kneisky)

National Championships

1st Madison (with Thomas Boudat)
1st Team pursuit
2nd Omnium

2019
UEC European Championships

1st Points race
2nd Elimination

2nd Madison, UCI World Cup, Minsk (with Benjamin Thomas)
