= 2015 UEC European Track Championships – Men's elimination race =

Men's elimination race at the 2015 UEC European Track Championships
- UEC European Champion jersey
- Venue: Velodrome Suisse, Grenchen
- Date: 17 October
- Competitors: 18 from 18 nations

Medalists
gold medal	Bryan Coquard	France
silver medal	Simone Consonni	Italy
bronze medal	Christopher Latham	Great Britain

The Men's elimination race was held on 17 October 2015.

== Results ==
Rank	Name	Nation
1st place, gold medalist(s)	Bryan Coquard	France
2nd place, silver medalist(s)	Simone Consonni	Italy
3rd place, bronze medalist(s)	Christopher Latham	Great Britain
4	Jan-Willem van Schip	Netherlands
5	Moreno De Pauw	Belgium
6	Andreas Müller	Austria
7	Vladyslav Kreminskyi	Ukraine
8	Yauheni Akhramenka	Belarus
9	Felix English	Ireland
10	Roger Kluge	Germany
11	Krisztián Lovassy	Hungary
12	Mateusz Nowak	Poland
13	Loïc Perizzolo	Switzerland
14	Andrey Sazanov	Russia
15	Ivo Oliveira	Portugal
16	František Sisr	Czech Republic
17	Recep Ünalan	Turkey
18	Ioannis Spanopoulos	Greece
