= Mosseldag =

Day of the Mussels Mosseldag
- Date: August 19, 2023
- Frequency: Annually
- Locations: Yerseke, Zeeland
- Country: The Netherlands
- Years active: 54
- Inaugurated: August 19, 1972
- Previous event: August 20, 2022
- Next event: August 19, 2023
- Attendance: +/- 50.000
- Website: mosseldagyerseke.nl

Mosseldag or Day of the Mussels is an annual event in the Dutch town of Yerseke. The event takes place on the third Saturday of August.

Annually, around 50,000 people visit the event. They come from the close region, but also from Belgium, Germany and France. Mosseldag is known for eating mussels, a local delicacy, and other seafood. You can go freely on a trip over the Eastern Scheldt with a mussel fishing boat (or watch the fleet go by), walk along the fair and watch the tattoo and fireworks in the evening.
