= Daniel López (cyclist) =

Spanish bicycle racer

Personal information
- Full name: Daniel López Parada
- Born: 21 January 1994 (age 32) A Coruña, Spain

Cycling career
- Sport: Cycling
- Current team: CC Cambre–Caeiro
- Disciplines: Road; Cyclo-cross
- Role: Rider

Amateur teams
- 2013: CC Cambre–Renault Caeiro
- 2014–2015: Caja Rural–Seguros RGA amateur
- 2020–: CC Cambre–Caeiro

Professional team
- 2016–2019: Burgos BH

Daniel López Parada (born 21 January 1994 in A Coruña) is a Spanish cyclist, who currently rides for Spanish amateur team CC Cambre–Caeiro.

== Major results ==
2017
8th Clásica de Almería
9th Vuelta a La Rioja
2018
1st Stage 12 Tour of Qinghai Lake
