= Bas van der Kooij =

Dutch cyclist (born 1995)

Personal information
- Full name: Bas van der Kooij
- Born: 16 November 1995 (age 30) Schiedam, Netherlands
- Height: 1.76 m (5 ft 9 in)
- Weight: 70 kg (154 lb)

Cycling career
- Sport: Cycling
- Discipline: Road
- Role: Rider
- Rider type: Sprinter

Amateur team
- 2017: Destil–Jo Piels

Professional teams
- 2018: Alecto Cycling Team
- 2019: Monkey Town–à Bloc
- 2020: BEAT Cycling Club
- 2021: VolkerWessels Cycling Team

Bas van der Kooij (born 16 November 1995) is a Dutch professional racing cyclist, who most recently rode for UCI Continental team VolkerWessels Cycling Team.

== Major results ==
2016
4th Road race, National Under-23 Road Championships
2018
3rd Fyen Rundt
3rd Antwerpse Havenpijl
4th Arnhem–Veenendaal Classic
6th PWZ Zuidenveld Tour
7th Circuit de Wallonie
8th Road race, National Road Championships
2019
1st De Kustpijl
Tour of Antalya

1st Points classification
1st Stage 2

2nd PWZ Zuidenveld Tour
3rd Road race, National Road Championships
3rd Himmerland Rundt
4th Overall Paris–Arras Tour
4th Arno Wallaard Memorial
5th Skive–Løbet
7th Rutland–Melton CiCLE Classic
2020
5th Dorpenomloop Rucphen
2021
9th Gooikse Pijl
