= Mike Teunissen =

Dutch cyclist (born 1992)

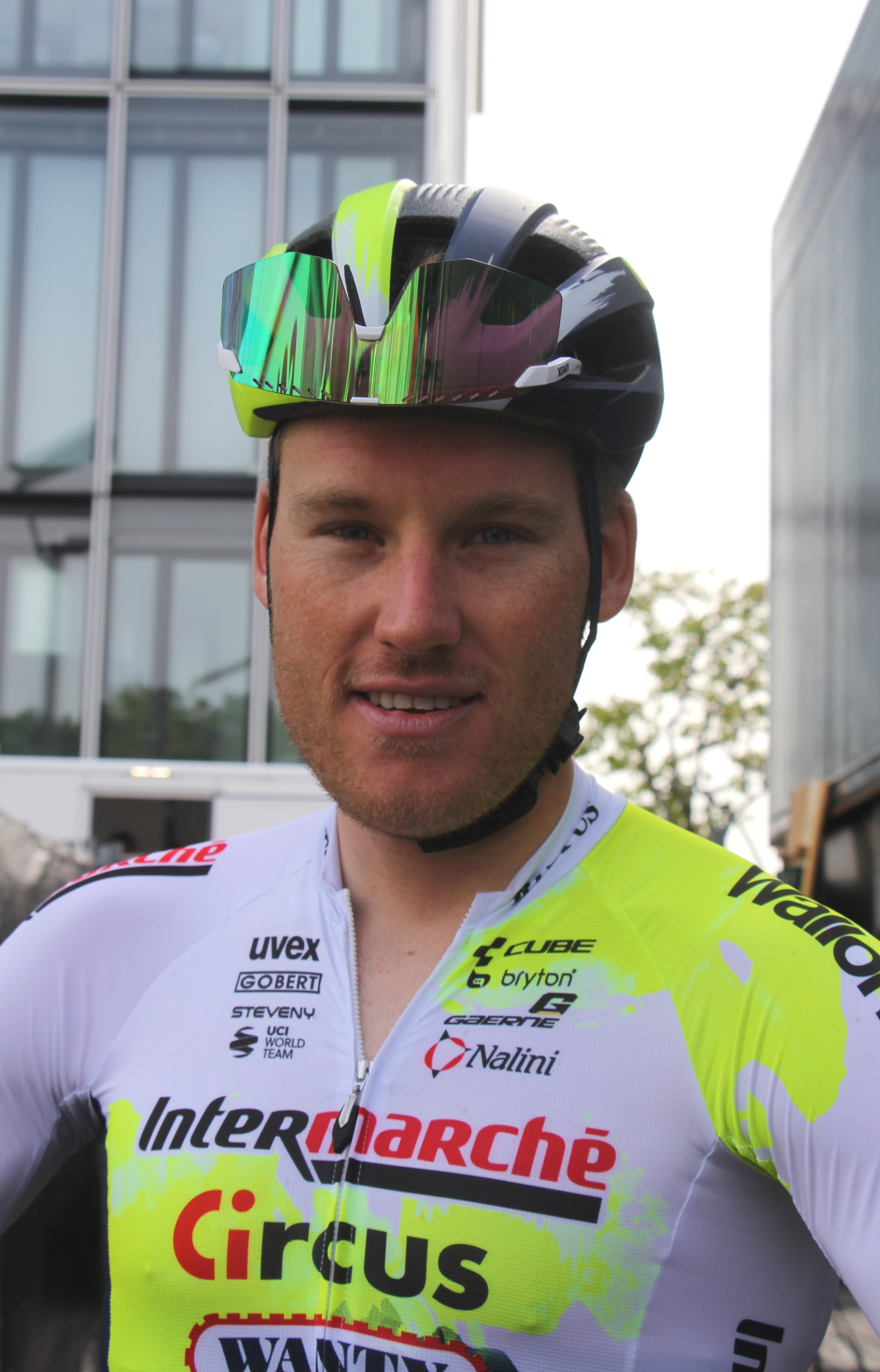
- Teunissen in 2023

Personal information
- Full name: Mike Teunissen
- Born: 25 August 1992 (age 34) Ysselsteyn, Netherlands
- Height: 1.84 m (6 ft 1/2 in)
- Weight: 73 kg (161 lb; 11 st 7 lb)

Cycling career
- Sport: Cycling
- Current team: XDS Astana Team
- Disciplines: Road; Cyclo-cross
- Role: Rider
- Rider type: Classics specialist; Lead-out man

Professional teams
- 2013–2014: Rabobank Development Team
- 2015–2016: LottoNL–Jumbo
- 2017–2018: Team Sunweb
- 2019–2022: Team Jumbo–Visma
- 2023–2024: Intermarché–Circus–Wanty
- 2025–: XDS Astana Team

Major wins
- Grand Tours Tour de France 1 individual stage (2019) 1 TTT stage (2019) Vuelta a España 1 TTT stage (2022) Stage races Four Days of Dunkirk (2019) ZLM Tour (2019)
Medal record
Representing Netherlands
Men's cyclo-cross
World Championships
Gold medal – first place	2013 Louisville	Men's under-23 race
Silver medal – second place	2011 Sankt Wendel	Men's under-23 race

Mike Teunissen (born 25 August 1992) is a Dutch racing cyclist, who currently rides for UCI WorldTeam XDS Astana Team.

== Career ==
He rode at the 2013 UCI Road World Championships, and was the winner of the World Under-23 Cyclo-cross Championships in 2013. He was named in the start list for the 2015 Vuelta a España. In June 2017, he was named in the startlist for the 2017 Tour de France.

In 2019, he had a top 10 finish in Paris-Roubaix. He was named to the start list of the 2019 Tour de France, where he was intended to be a leadout man for Dylan Groenewegen. Late in stage one as the sprint trains were coming together there was a crash, which eliminated Groenewegen's chances and ruined the team's plans of getting the stage win and yellow jersey. Teunissen seized the moment, knowing he was already in a good position, and went for the stage win anyway. He just barely edged all-time great Peter Sagan on the line, winning the Yellow Jersey in the process. The following day he was part of another stage victory in the team time trial, which gave him one more day in the race lead.

== Major results ==
=== Cyclo-cross ===
2008–2009
Junior Superprestige

3rd Gieten

2009–2010
3rd Overall Junior Superprestige

1st Diegem
2nd Ruddervoorde
2nd Hamme
2nd Gieten

Junior Gazet van Antwerpen

2nd Loenhout
3rd Koppenberg

2nd Kalmthout
UCI Junior World Cup

3rd Heusden-Zolder

3rd National Junior Championships
3rd Junior Sint-Michielsgestel
2010–2011
2nd UCI World Under-23 Championships
2nd National Under-23 Championships
2011–2012
Under-23 Superprestige

1st Hamme
3rd Gieten
3rd Diegem
3rd Hoogstraten

2nd UEC European Under-23 Championships
Under-23 Gazet van Antwerpen

2nd Baal

UCI Under-23 World Cup

3rd Tábor

2012–2013
1st UCI World Under-23 Championships
1st UEC European Under-23 Championships
Under-23 Superprestige

1st Ruddervoorde
1st Diegem

UCI Under-23 World Cup

1st Tábor
2nd Rome

3rd National Under-23 Championships
3rd Kalmthout
2013–2014
Under-23 Superprestige

1st Zonhoven

2nd Woerden
3rd Surhuisterveen
UCI Under-23 World Cup

3rd Heusden-Zolder

3rd National Under-23 Championships

=== Road ===
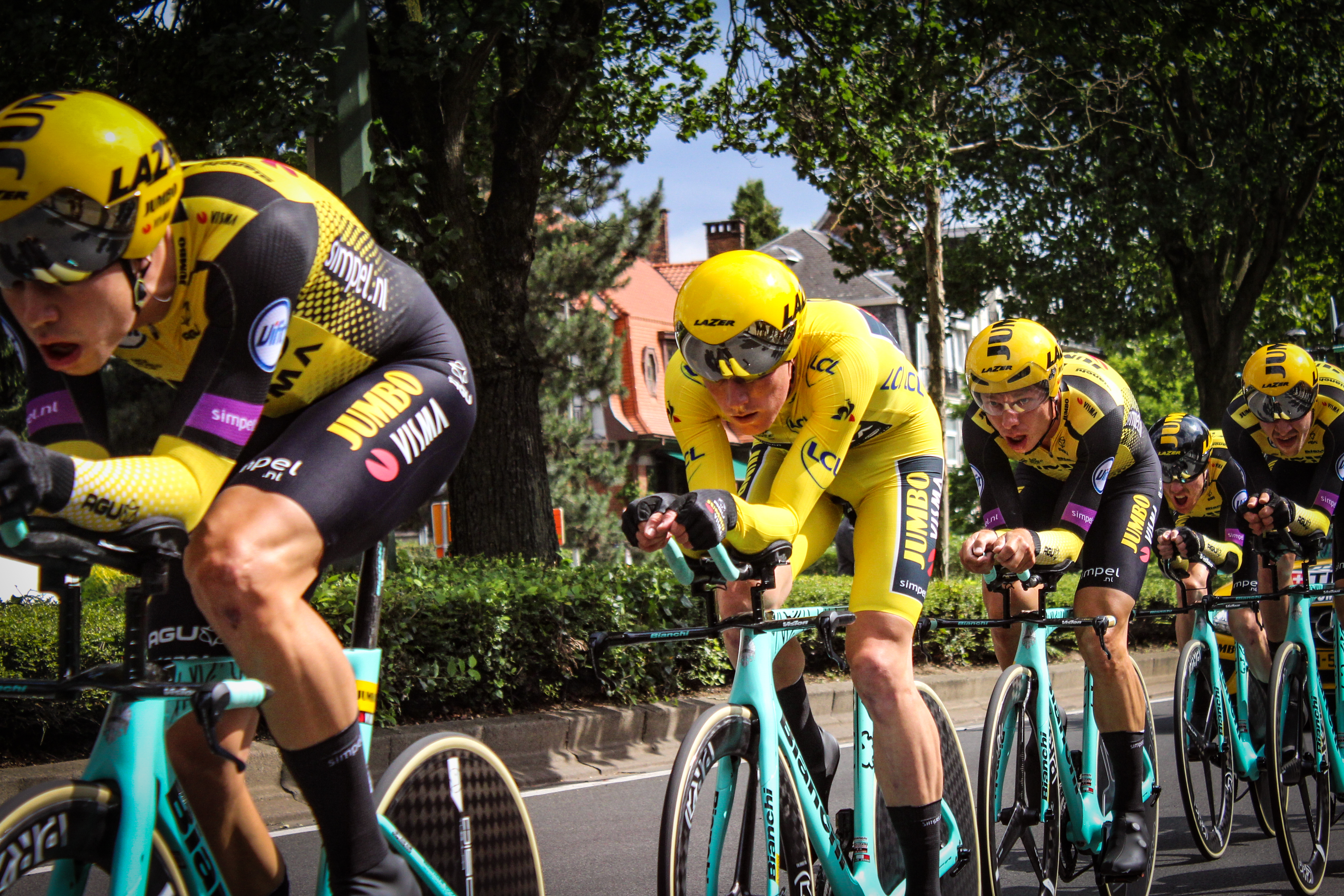
Teunissen (second left) in the yellow jersey, as part of Team Jumbo–Visma, during stage 2 of the 2019 Tour de France. He lost the race lead the following day.

2010
1st Stage 2 (TTT) Liège–La Gleize
4th Omloop Het Nieuwsblad Juniors
5th Remouchamps–Ferrières–Remouchamps
2012
4th Ronde van Limburg
8th Paris–Roubaix Espoirs
2013
1st Rabo Baronie Breda Classic
National Under-23 Championships

2nd Road race
4th Time trial

2nd Arno Wallaard Memorial
5th Internationale Wielertrofee Jong Maar Moedig
8th Overall Tour des Fjords
8th Overall Kreiz Breizh Elites
10th Omloop Het Nieuwsblad U23
2014
1st Paris–Roubaix Espoirs
1st Paris–Tours Espoirs
1st Rabo Baronie Breda Classic
2nd Time trial, National Under-23 Championships
3rd Overall Boucles de la Mayenne

1st Young rider classification

3rd Omloop der Kempen
5th Ronde van Vlaanderen U23
6th Overall Le Triptyque des Monts et Châteaux
10th Grote Prijs Jef Scherens
2015 (1 pro win)
1st Prologue Tour de l'Ain
2nd London–Surrey Classic
7th Grand Prix Impanis-Van Petegem
9th Paris–Tours
2016
9th Dwars door Vlaanderen
2017
9th Paris–Tours
2018
2nd Dwars door Vlaanderen
5th Road race, National Championships
2019 (5)
1st Overall Four Days of Dunkirk

1st Points classification
1st Stages 5 & 6

1st Overall ZLM Tour
Tour de France

1st Stages 1 & 2 (TTT)
Held & after Stages 1–2

4th Tacx Pro Classic
5th EuroEyes Cyclassics
6th Overall BinckBank Tour
6th Münsterland Giro
7th Overall Tour of Britain
7th Paris–Roubaix
7th Famenne Ardenne Classic
9th Primus Classic
10th Three Days of Bruges–De Panne
2020
6th Omloop Het Nieuwsblad
8th Overall BinckBank Tour
2021
3rd Overall Tour of Norway

1st Points classification

3rd Overall Danmark Rundt
4th Road race, National Championships
8th Eschborn–Frankfurt
10th Overall Benelux Tour
2022
Vuelta a España

1st Stage 1 (TTT)
Held after Stage 2

2023 (2)
1st Stage 1 Tour of Norway
4th Rund um Köln
5th Road race, UEC European Road Championships
5th Overall Renewi Tour

1st Stage 3

8th Le Samyn
8th Binche–Chimay–Binche
9th Egmont Cycling Race
9th Trofeo Ses Salines–Alcúdia
2024
2nd Tour of Leuven
4th Road race, National Championships
4th Paris–Tours
8th Hamburg Cyclassics
9th Super 8 Classic
2025
5th Dwars door het Hageland
5th Super 8 Classic
8th Gran Premio Castellón
8th Muur Classic Geraardsbergen
10th E3 Saxo Classic
2026
2nd Hamburg Cyclassics
4th Overall Renewi Tour
5th Kuurne–Brussels–Kuurne
10th Paris–Roubaix

==== Grand Tour general classification results timeline ====
Grand Tour	2015	2016	2017	2018	2019	2020	2021	2022	2023	2024	2025
Giro d'Italia	Has not contested during career										
Tour de France	—	—	129	—	101	—	76	—	103	93	80
Vuelta a España	104	—	—	109	—	—	—	91	—	—	—

==== Classics results timeline ====
Monument	2015	2016	2017	2018	2019	2020	2021	2022	2023	2024	2025	2026
Milan–San Remo	—	—	—	—	18	—	—	—	89	61	11	14
Tour of Flanders	—	56	81	18	31	—	—	19	—	25	12	32
Paris–Roubaix	—	45	49	11	7	NH	85	20	17	22	16	10
Liège–Bastogne–Liège	DNF	—	—	—	—	—	—	—	—	—	—	—
Giro di Lombardia	Has not contested during career											
Classic	2015	2016	2017	2018	2019	2020	2021	2022	2023	2024	2025	2026
Omloop Het Nieuwsblad	—	33	12	—	33	6	—	24	11	13	19	26
Kuurne–Brussels–Kuurne	DNF	—	—	—	—	—	—	14	—	13	29	5
E3 Harelbeke	—	—	DNF	38	51	NH	—	12	67	—	10	102
Gent–Wevelgem	—	68	79	34	25	18	—	51	91	57	16	24
Dwars door Vlaanderen	DNF	9	16	2	18	NH	—	28	—	19	45	—
Eschborn–Frankfurt	—	—	DNF	—	—	NH	8	—	—	40	79	—
Hamburg Cyclassics	—	56	—	—	5	NH	NH	—	—	8	20	2
Paris–Tours	9	16	9	—	—	—	—	56	28	4	36	

Legend
—	Did not compete
DNF	Did not finish
