= Yerseke =

- Village
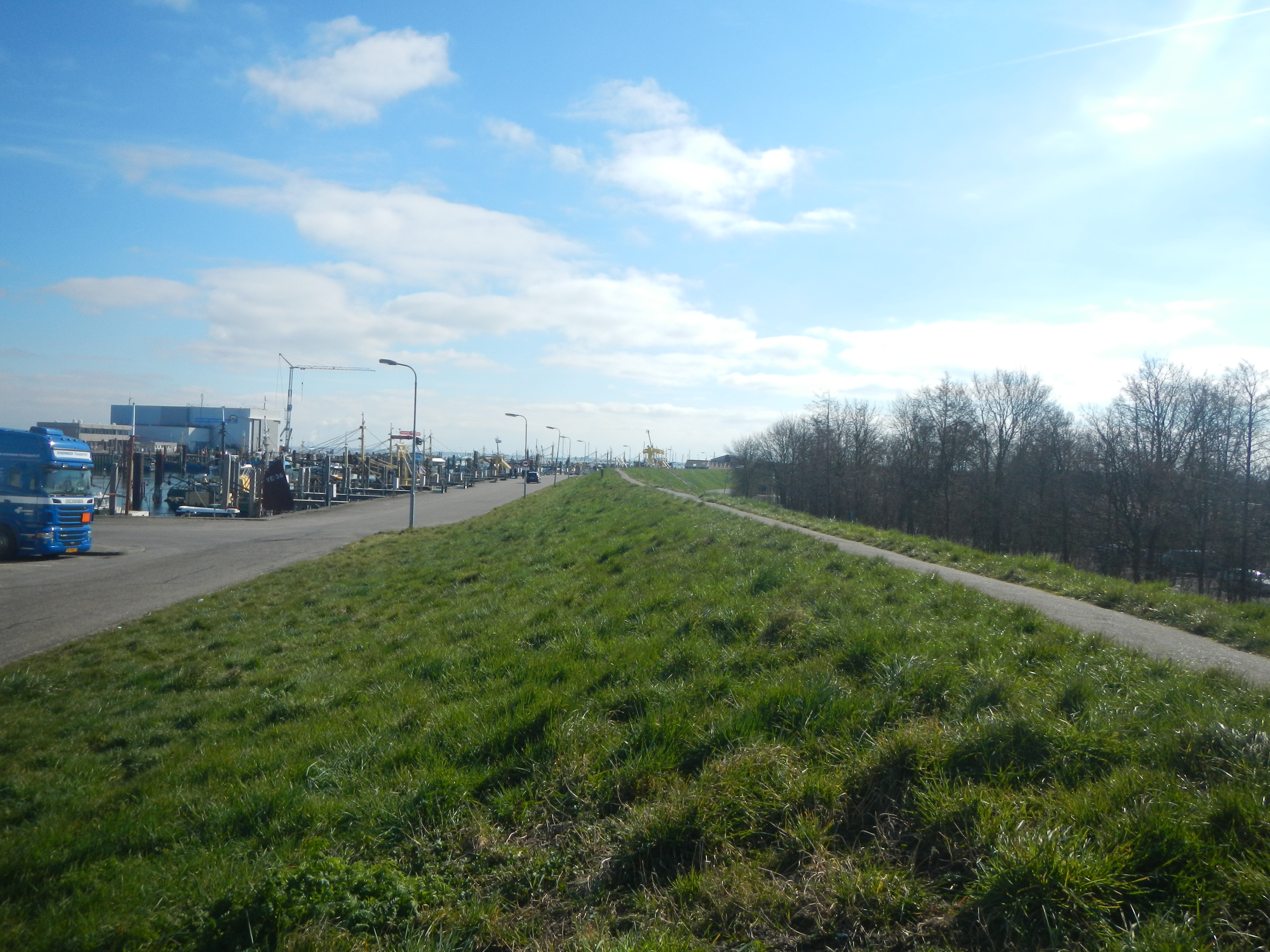
- Welcome to Clinge

- Flag Coat of arms
- Nickname: Yese (Zeeuws)
- Location in the province of Zeeland in the Netherlands Yerseke (Netherlands)
- Coordinates: 51°30′N 4°03′E
- Country: Netherlands
- Province: Zeeland
- Municipality: Reimerswaal

Area
  - Total: 13.73 km^{2} (5.30 sq mi)
- Elevation: 0.7 m (2.3 ft)

Population (2021)
  - Total: 7,015
  - Density: 510.9/km^{2} (1,323/sq mi)
- Time zone: UTC+1 (CET)
  - Summer (DST): UTC+2 (CEST)
- Postal code: 4400-4401
- Dialing code: 0113
- Website: yersekepromotie.nl

Yerseke (Dutch: [ˈirsəkə], Zeeuws: [ˈisə]) is a village situated on the southern shore of the Oosterschelde (Eastern Scheldt) estuary in the Dutch province of Zeeland. A separate municipality until 1970, it today forms part of the municipality of Reimerswaal. As of 2010 Yerseke had a recorded population of 6,695 inhabitants, living in 2,680 households.

The fishing village is well known for its aquaculture. Tourists visit the oyster pits, harbors and museum of the town and fishing industry, as well as the annual celebration of the mussel harvest (Mosseldag) in August. The village furthermore plays host to the Royal Netherlands Institute for Sea Research (NIOZ).

== History ==
The site of Yerseke may have been inhabited for more than a millennium, and possibly since before the early Middle Ages. Skeletal remains found in 1923 during an archaeological dig were dated to the Carolingian period (7th to 9th centuries).

However, the first historical mention of Yerseke most likely dates to a deed, or charter, issued on January 24, 966 CE under the name of 'Gersika' by the Holy Roman Emperor Otto I (the Great). The area was originally property of abbeys in Flanders. The town was founded on a ridge (like many settlements of that era) as dikes were only built in the 13th century by monks. The earliest inhabitants practiced sheep farming and later extracted peat from surrounding moors when dikes were constructed.

Agriculture remained the primary activity of the town until the 16th century, when the Saint Felix flood inundated large parts of land around the now lost trading city of Reimerswaal to the east. As a result, Yerseke turned from a landlocked village into one located along the shore of the Eastern Scheldt, which would shape much of its future.

While initially the economy of Yerseke remained little changed, fishing and aquaculture rapidly acquired greater importance, along with a concurrent population increase, beginning in the 19th century. The industry had its origins in the nearby hamlet Yersekendam that had a small harbour, and is now amalgamated with the town of Yerseke itself.

During World War II the village suffered heavy damage. When Nazi Germany invaded in May 1940, many villagers evacuated due to anticipated fighting along the defensive Zanddijk line, stretching from the village southwards towards Hansweert across Zuid-Beveland. French naval bombardment from the Western Scheldt of German positions along the defensive line and Canal through Zuid-Beveland resulted in severe damage to the town. The main church was, along with much of the town centre, almost entirely ruined. Besides the church, twenty-five structures were completely destroyed while an additional 36 received heavy damage, causing seventy families to become homeless. Although the village was liberated by Canadian forces in 1944, Nazi V-1 rockets struck the village in March 1945. During the occupation, men from the village were taken to Germany as forced labourers for German industry.

The North Sea flood of 1953 did not cause flooding within the town itself. However, many of the town's fishing vessels assisted inundated communities.

== Aquaculture ==
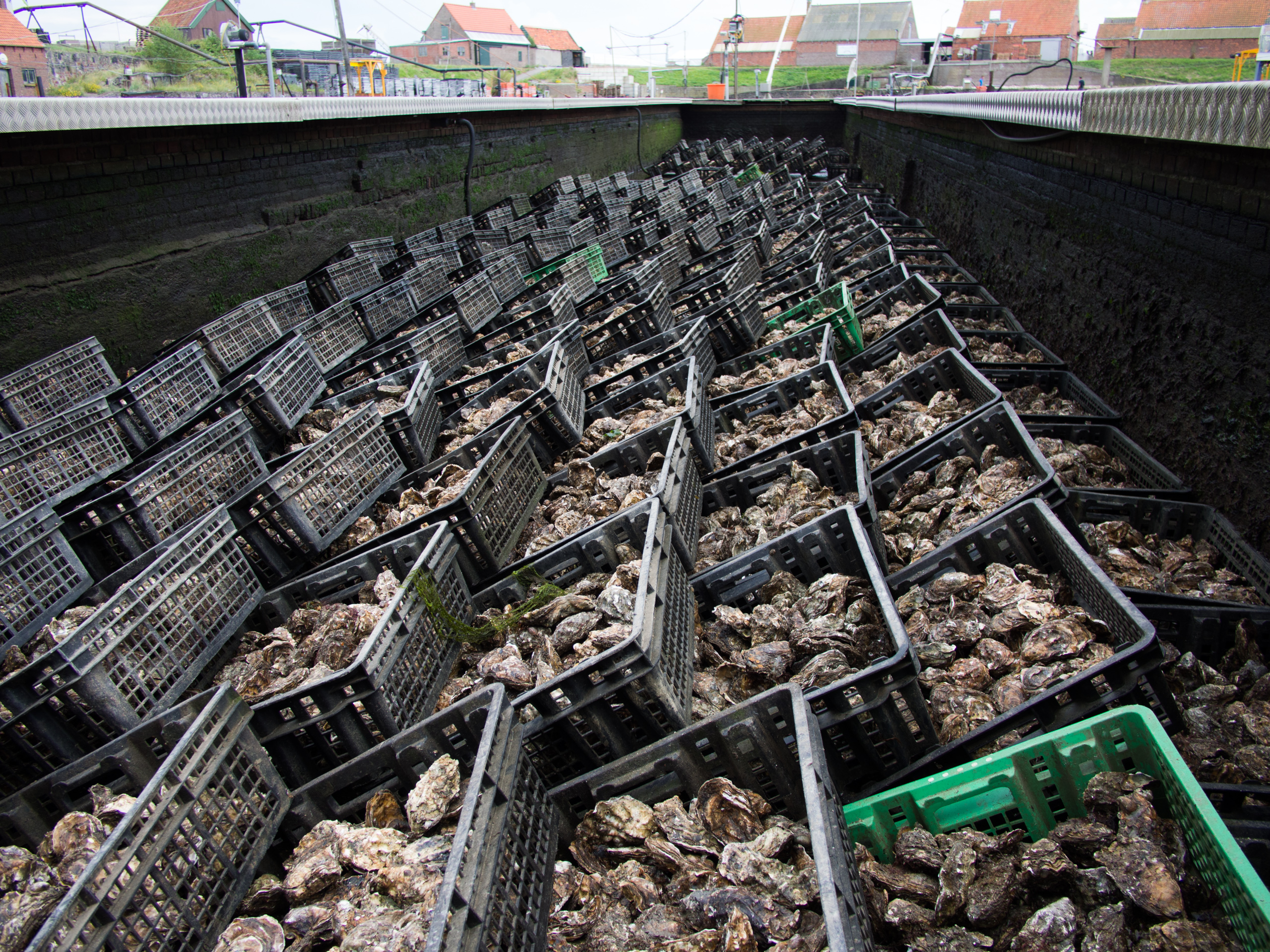
Oysters are kept in large oyster pits after harvesting, until they are sold. Seawater is pumped in and out, simulating the tide.

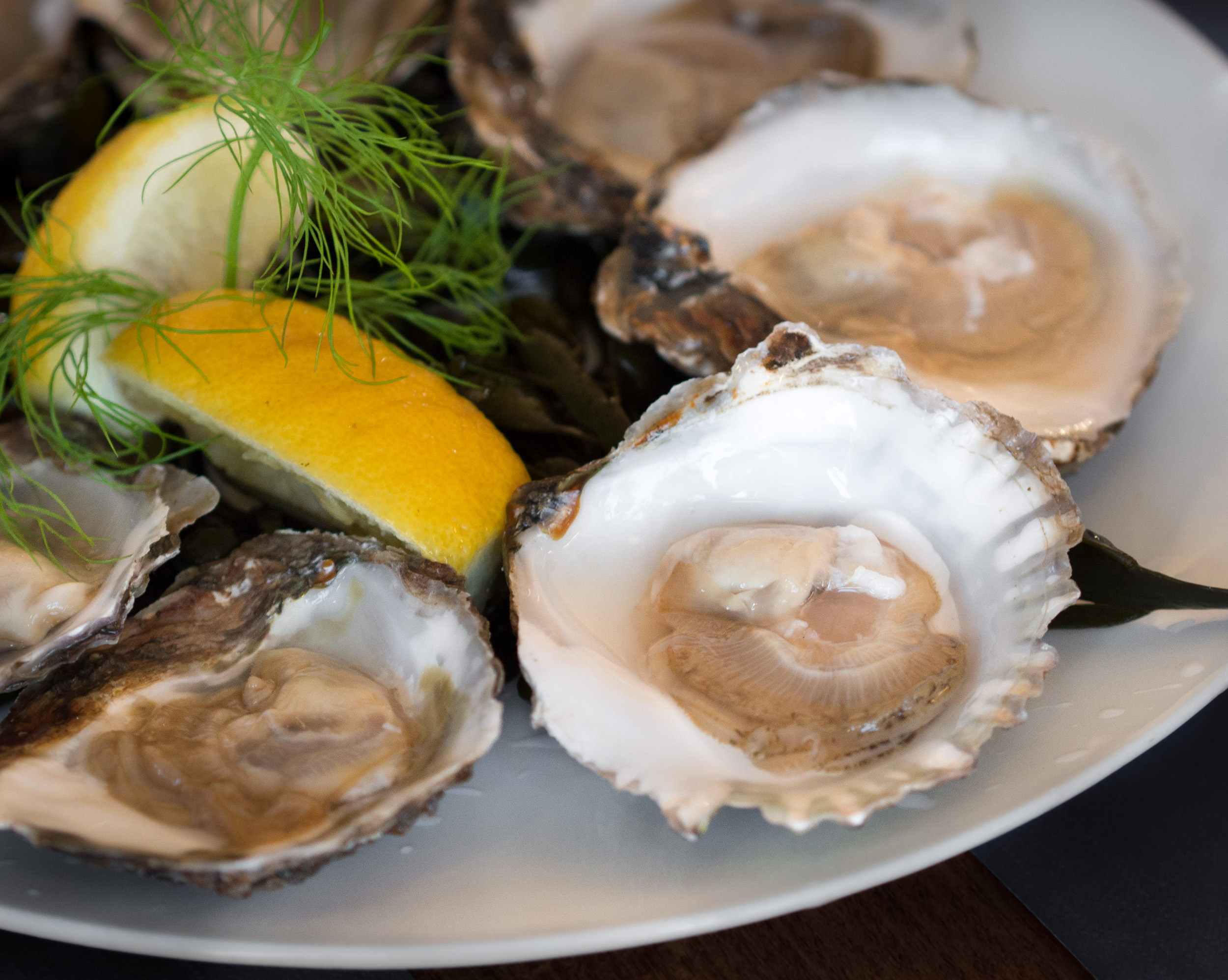
The European flat oyster is known locally as "Zeeuwse platte"

The locality is well known in the region and farther afield, especially in Belgium, for its aquaculture and fishing industry: particularly for the cultivation from the Eastern Scheldt of mussels, oysters, periwinkles, and lobster. Due to the economic success and wealth created by the oyster and mussel industries, Yerseke has received the nickname "Klondike of Zeeland", while mussels are sometimes referred to as "black gold" (zwart goud).

Starting approximately in 1870, the village began large-scale cultivation of oysters, partly in response to high French demand. For this purpose, parcels within the Eastern Scheldt were leased out by the government for farming, while pits outside the dikes employing roof tiles were constructed to cultivate oyster larvae. These pits were eventually abandoned in the 20th century, replaced by pits built within the dikes close to the harbour, where roof tiles have given way to modern racks. The pits also serve to flush oysters harvested from the estuaries, and are surrounded by old, characteristic warehouses.

While the oyster industry created wealth, it also suffered many setbacks and upheavals, as well as creating social inequalities. In 1885, some oyster farmers sought greater opportunities by immigrating to West Sayville, New York on Long Island, where wild oysters were once abundant. During the 20th century, further setbacks in the form of harsh winters, especially in 1963, and the threatened closing of the Eastern Scheldt by a dam almost led to the collapse of the oyster industry. After moderate recovery, the bacterium Bonamia ostreae infected the prevalent flat oysters, again decimating the industry in 1980. This led to the introduction of the Pacific oyster, now the most cultivated oyster species, which some consider an invasive species.

Mussels have always been a staple along the coast, but only at the end of the 19th century were there concerted efforts at standardising production. Beginning approximately after the war, mussels have slowly gained ever greater economic significance and eclipsed the oyster in importance. This is manifest by the village hosting the only mussel auction in the world. In the past, mussels were caught and harvested with small sailing sloops, the so-called hoogaars and hengst. Today, highly advanced and much larger ships are employed, able to not only manage the harvest on the Eastern Scheldt but sail longer distances, including to the Wadden Sea where mussels have been seeded and harvested since about 1950 when a parasite threatened the harvest in the Eastern Scheldt. The mussels are grown and harvested entirely at sea in a mostly natural process.

The harbor of Yerseke has expanded continuously since the 19th century along with the fishing industry. The original harbor of Yersekendam, initially a loading dock for agricultural products bound for the island of Tholen, was expanded to accommodate fishing boats. This was supplemented with a larger harbour in 1965, named after then Crown Princess Beatrix. A much larger harbour, named after then Queen Juliana and opened in 1981, is deep enough to accommodate the largest and most modern vessels, and also boasts a dry dock for maintenance. A statue of an old "mussel man" commemorates the opening by Princess Juliana on 18 June 1981.

As part of the Delta Works to prevent future flooding after the North Sea floods in 1953, the originally proposed closed earthen dam of the Eastern Scheldt was altered into an open storm surge barrier. This engineering work served to (partially) protect the ecology of the estuary and with it the vital fishing industry of the town that depends on regular tidal movements. Resistance from Yerseke and her fisherman, as well as environmentalists, prevented the complete closure of the Eastern Scheldt.

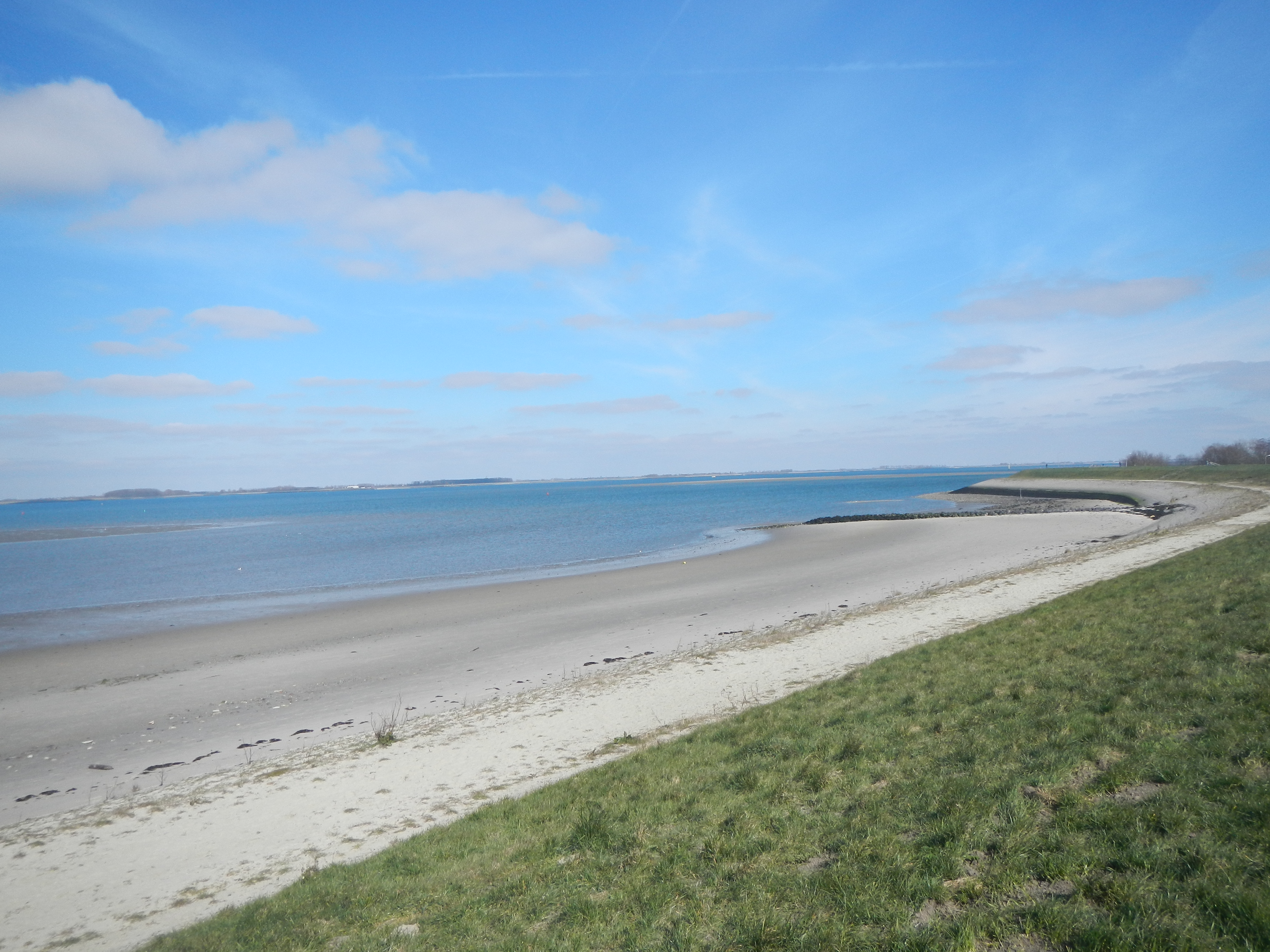
Beach of Yerseke

During the third Saturday of August every year, the village celebrates the official start of the mussel harvest with the annual Mosseldag, although these days the season tends to begin earlier. The event attracts approximately 50,000 visitors who come to eat mussels, take free cruises on mussel ships, and enjoy flee markets, beer tents, parades and marching bands, as well as traditional regional activities including regional dress. The Friday evening before the event, a dance festival is organised. Instead of the yearly fireworks, they will keep after several years, again the well known Mosselrock.

The fishing industry supports many businesses and organisations. Yerseke is host to the internationally top-ranked Centre for Estuarine and Marine Ecology (CEME, Centrum voor Estuariene en Mariene Ecologie), formerly the Delta Institute for Hydrobiological Research and part of the Dutch Institute for Ecology (NIOO, Nederlands Instituut voor Ecologie). CEME conducts research in estuaries and coastal waters in Europe, Africa, Asia, and the Polar Regions, as well as participating in several deep-sea projects.

A museum close to the main church details the town's history, the fishing industry and the natural environment of the Eastern Scheldt. Several seafood restaurants in the village showcase the fishing industry, including the recently closed Nolet het Reymerswale that for years boasted a Michelin star (the adjacent restaurant Nolet's Vistro remains open and shares the same kitchen).

== Yerseke Moer ==
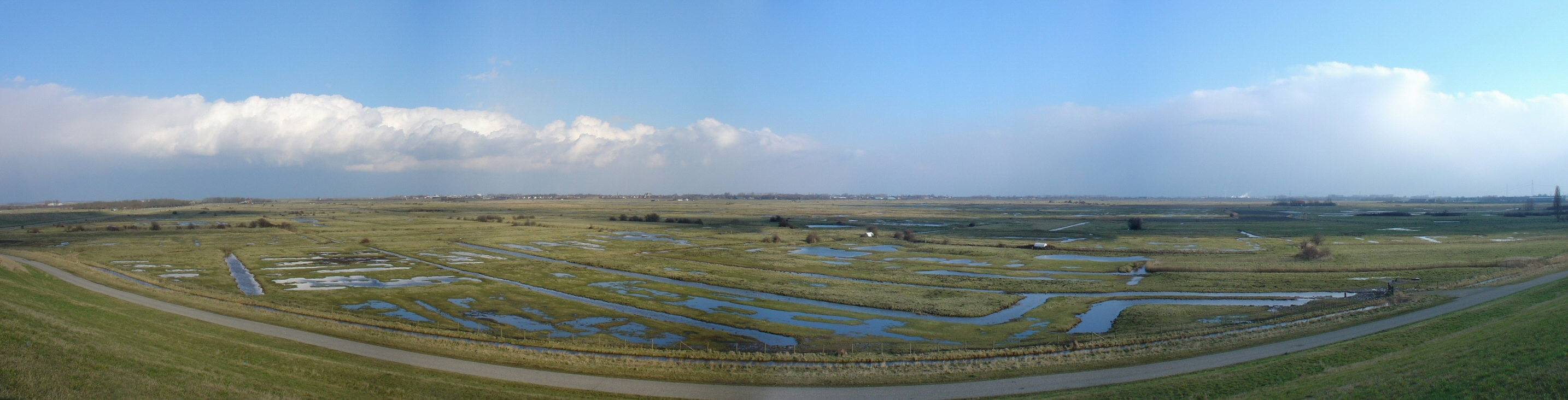
Panorama of the Yerseke Moer

The main natural feature of the town is the Moer (moor) partially surrounding the town, extending westwards along the Eastern Scheldt shoreline, and southeast to the hamlet of Vlake along the canal. This natural area is a former salt-water tidal marsh, separated by dikes from the sea around 1200 CE by monks for the purposes of farming and peat extraction, which boasted a high salt content (a lucrative commodity in the Middle Ages). Extraction has since formed the characteristic landscape today: rich, low-lying meadows atop a thick peat layer are interspersed by sandy creek ridges along which roads and paths have developed over the centuries. Due to large variation in soils and sand, a great variety of fauna has developed and the area has become a protected bird sanctuary. A trail guides walkers through the moor.

== Churches and religion ==
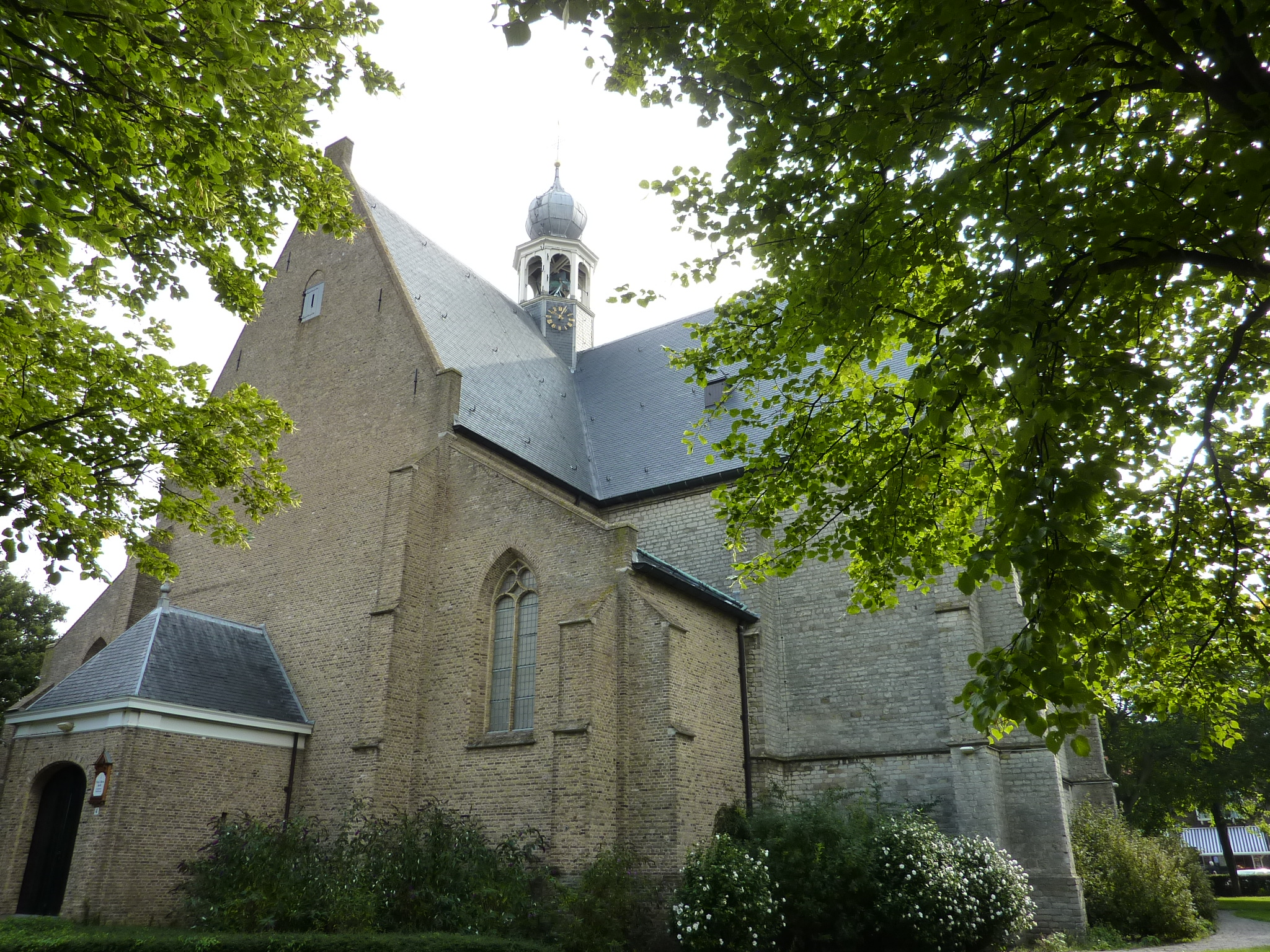
Church of St. Odulphus in the town centre

The main church of the town is the Dutch Reformed Church Protestant congregation located in the centre of the village, also historically the highest point of the surrounding area. This church is part of the Protestant Church in the Netherlands (PKN), formed by a merger in 2004 with the Lutheran churches.

The main medieval church, a grade-listed building built in a simple Gothic style, was constructed in the second half of the 15th century, although a church has stood on the same spot since the 12th century. The nave was lost to fire or flooding in 1532. The original transept, crossing, choir and sacristy remain, and form the functioning church today. The church added a 51-meter neo-Gothic bell tower in 1887 and received its first organ a year later.

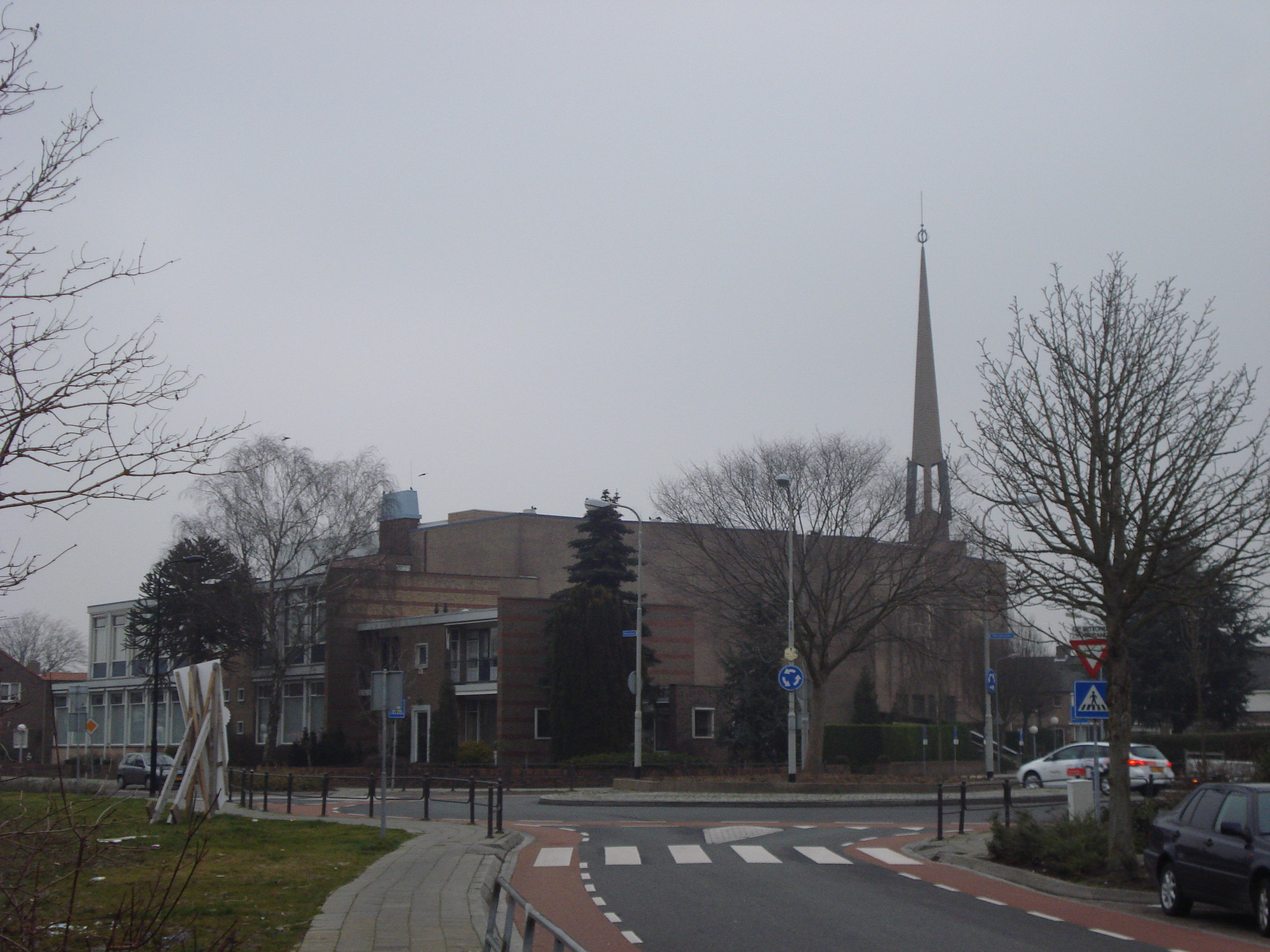
Church of the Netherlands Reformed Congregation in Yerseke

On May 16, 1940, during the Battle of Zeeland, naval bombardment severely damaged the church: the bell tower and roof both collapsed, while fire gutted the interior, destroying the stained-glass windows and organ in the process. The church was restored in 1948, while the tower was never rebuilt, eventually replaced with a much smaller belfry atop the crossing's roof. A bay was added to the west side of the crossing, where a new organ was installed in 1974, partially with funds from a villager who emigrated to the United States. The difference between the new and old bricks is clearly visible.

Additional churches and congregations in the town include:

- Hervormde Gemeente Rehoboth (PKN)
- Netherlands Reformed Congregation, a conservative denomination with the largest congregation in town,
- Free Evangelical Church
- Reformed Church (PKN)

Due to lack of congregants, a small Catholic church built in 1893 was remodeled as a residence from 2003 onwards.

== Events ==
- Mosseldag, third Saturday of August: annual celebration of the mussel harvest. Every year, around 50,000 people visit the event. Visitors mainly come from Belgium, Germany and France.

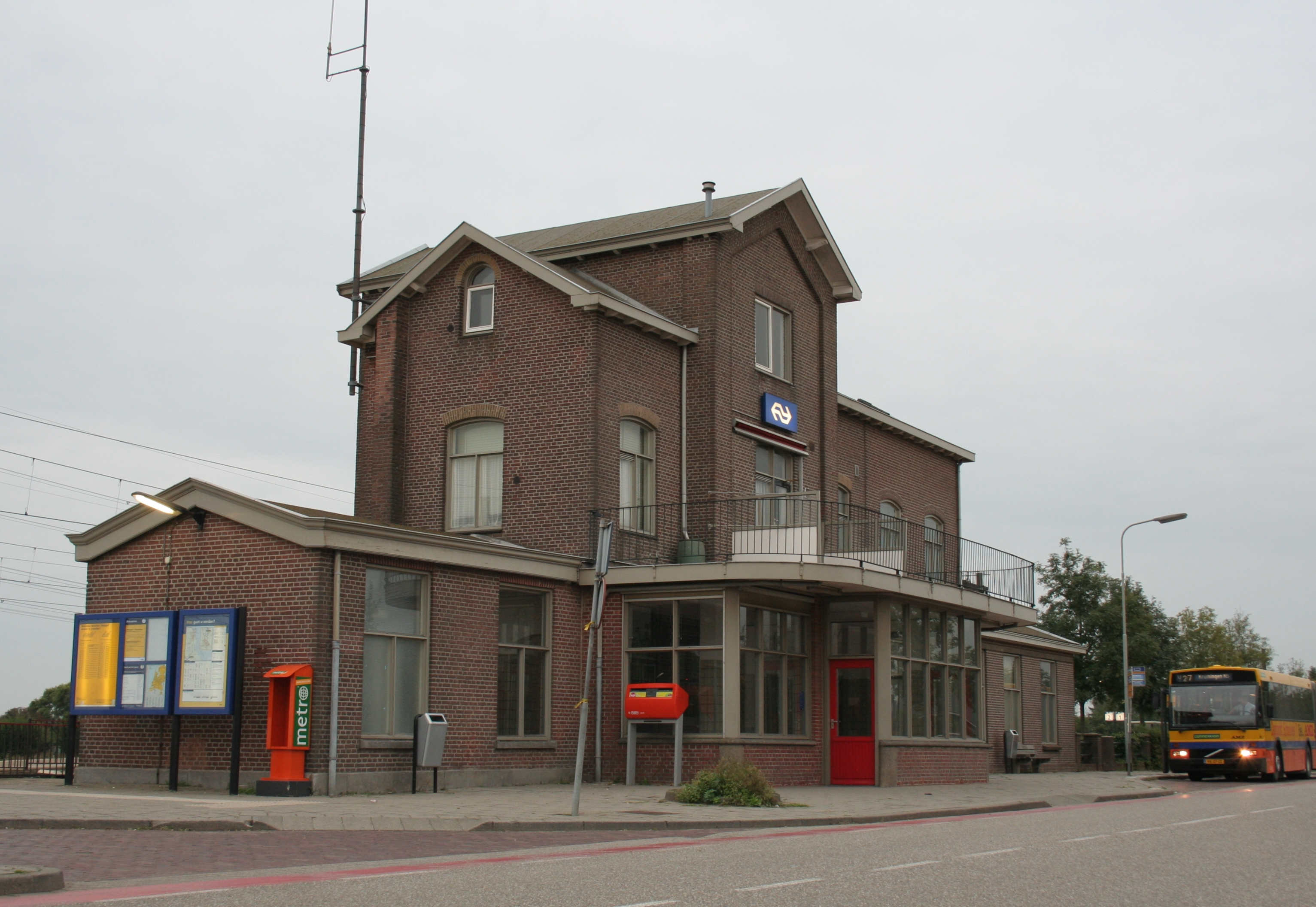
Railway station Kruiningen-Yerseke

== Transport ==
The village is served by Dutch Railways with half-hourly services to both Amsterdam and Vlissingen. The station is located 4 km to the south, close to the neighbouring town of Kruiningen, accessible by regular bus services. The A58 motorway, with access points close to the railway station, connects to the national motorway network. The small size of the village makes it easily walkable and traversable by bike.
