= 2016 UCI Road World Championships – Men's under-23 road race =

Men's under-23 road race
2016 UCI Road World Championships

Race details
- Dates: 13 October 2016
- Stages: 1
- Distance: 166.0 km (103.1 mi)
- Winning time: 3h 40' 53"

Medalists
	Gold	Kristoffer Halvorsen (NOR)
	Silver	Pascal Ackermann (GER)
	Bronze	Jakub Mareczko (ITA)

The Men's under-23 road race of the 2016 UCI Road World Championships took place in Doha, Qatar, on October 13, 2016. The course of the race was 166 km (103 mi).

== Results ==
Rank	Rider	Country	Time
1	Kristoffer Halvorsen	Norway	3h 40' 53"
2	Pascal Ackermann	Germany	m.t.
3	Jakub Mareczko	Italy	m.t.
4	Phil Bauhaus	Germany	m.t.
5	Amund Grøndahl Jansen	Norway	m.t.
6	Jason Lowndes	Australia	m.t.
7	Iván García	Spain	m.t.
8	Aksel Nõmmela	Estonia	m.t.
9	Jonathan Dibben	United Kingdom	m.t.
10	Alan Banaszek	Poland	m.t.
11	Mads Pedersen	Denmark	m.t.
12	Álvaro Hodeg	Colombia	m.t.
13	Erik Baška	Slovakia	m.t.
14	Fabio Jakobsen	Netherlands	m.t.
15	Cees Bol	Netherlands	m.t.
16	Colin Joyce	United States	m.t.
17	Juan Sebastián Molano	Colombia	m.t.
18	Dušan Rajović	Serbia	m.t.
19	Hugo Hofstetter	France	m.t.
20	Merhawi Kudus	Eritrea	m.t.
21	César Martingil	Portugal	m.t.
22	Lukas Spengler	Switzerland	m.t.
23	Mohammad Ganjkhanlou	Iran	m.t.
24	Marco Mathis	Germany	m.t.
25	Yevgeniy Gidich	Kazakhstan	m.t.
26	El Mehdi Chokri	Morocco	m.t.
27	Ivo Oliveira	Portugal	m.t.
28	Hayden McCormick	New Zealand	m.t.
29	Riccardo Minali	Italy	m.t.
30	Daniel Auer	Austria	m.t.
31	Mads Würtz Schmidt	Denmark	m.t.
32	Gašper Katrašnik	Slovenia	m.t.
33	Bram Welten	Netherlands	m.t.
34	Grigoriy Shtein	Kazakhstan	m.t.
35	Christopher Latham	United Kingdom	m.t.
36	Nassim Saidi	Algeria	m.t.
37	Justin Oien	United States	m.t.
38	Samir Jabrayilov	Azerbaijan	m.t.
39	Krists Neilands	Latvia	m.t.
40	Jan-Willem van Schip	Netherlands	m.t.
41	Alexey Voloshin	Kazakhstan	m.t.
42	David Drouin	Canada	m.t.
43	Alexandr Riabushenko	Belarus	m.t.
44	Gonzalo Serrano	Spain	m.t.
45	Tao Geoghegan Hart	United Kingdom	m.t.
46	Sebastian Schönberger	Austria	m.t.
47	Lukas Schlemmer	Austria	m.t.
48	Miles Scotson	Australia	m.t.
49	Eddie Dunbar	Ireland	+ 08 s
50	Maximilian Schachmann	Germany	m.t.
51	Szymon Rekita	Poland	m.t.
52	Pavel Sivakov	Russia	m.t.
53	Daniel Martínez	Colombia	m.t.
54	Neilson Powless	United States	m.t.
55	Patrick Gamper	Austria	+ 11 s
56	Ľuboš Malovec	Slovakia	m.t.
57	Daire Feeley	Ireland	m.t.
58	Andrej Petrovski	Macedonia	m.t.
59	Ben Perry	Canada	m.t.
60	Alexandr Kulikovskiy	Russia	m.t.
61	Michael Carbel	Denmark	m.t.
62	Kevin Geniets	Luxembourg	m.t.
63	Sergey Luchshenko	Kazakhstan	m.t.
64	Anders Skaarseth	Norway	m.t.
65	Silver Mäoma	Estonia	+ 15 s
66	Uladzimir Harakhavik	Belarus	m.t.
67	Sam Dobbs	New Zealand	m.t.
68	Abderrahmane Mansouri	Algeria	+ 20 s
69	Jon Irisarri	Spain	m.t.
70	Piet Allegaert	Belgium	+ 27 s
71	Sergey Rostovtsev	Russia	m.t.
72	Ole Forfang	Norway	m.t.
73	Christofer Jurado	Panama	m.t.
74	Fridtjof Røinås	Norway	m.t.
75	Kasper Asgreen	Denmark	m.t.
76	Simone Consonni	Italy	m.t.
77	Karl Patrick Lauk	Estonia	m.t.
78	Rémi Cavagna	France	m.t.
79	Gabriel Cullaigh	United Kingdom	m.t.
80	Tom Bohli	Switzerland	m.t.
81	Benoît Cosnefroy	France	m.t.
82	Vincenzo Albanese	Italy	+ 33 s
83	Abderrahim Zahiri	Morocco	+ 44 s
84	Jean Claude Uwizeye	Rwanda	m.t.
85	Stefan de Bod	South Africa	m.t.
86	Lennard Kämna	Germany	+ 49 s
87	Emil Vinjebo	Denmark	m.t.
88	Hicham Mokhtari	Algeria	+ 1' 11"
89	Nans Peters	France	m.t.
90	Yonatan Haile	Eritrea	m.t.
91	Josip Rumac	Croatia	m.t.
92	Oskar Nisu	Estonia	+ 1' 29"
93	Stepan Kurianov	Russia	m.t.
94	Ismail Iliasov	Azerbaijan	m.t.
95	Mohcine El Kouraji	Morocco	m.t.
96	Juraj Lajcha	Slovakia	+ 1' 55"
97	Hiu Fung Choi	Hong Kong	m.t.
98	Joseph Areruya	Rwanda	m.t.
99	Victor Langellotti	Monaco	+ 2' 02"
100	Davide Ballerini	Italy	+ 2' 15"
101	David Per	Slovenia	
102	Yacine Hamza	Algeria	+ 2' 30"
103	Patrick Jager	Austria	+ 2' 32"
104	Martin Schäppi	Switzerland	+ 2' 52"
105	Matthew Teggart	Ireland	+ 2' 58"
106	Michael O'Loughlin	Ireland	
107	Guillaume Seye	Belgium	+ 3' 01"
108	Enzo Wouters	Belgium	
109	Stylianós Farantákis	Greece	+ 3' 22"
110	Maxim Piskunov	Russia	
111	Jérémy Lecroq	France	+ 3' 38"
112	James Shaw	United Kingdom	
113	Valens Ndayisenga	Rwanda	+ 3' 45"
114	Christophe Noppe	Belgium	+ 3' 54"
115	Germán Tivani	Argentina	+ 4' 29"
116	Geoffrey Curran	United States	+ 5' 01"
117	Corentin Ermenault	France	
118	Izidor Penko	Slovenia	+ 5' 07"
119	Jon Božič	Slovenia	
120	Stefan Stefanović	Serbia	
121	Michael Storer	Australia	
122	Przemysław Kasperkiewicz	Poland	+ 5' 13"
123	Michal Schlegel	Czech Republic	
124	Samuel Maldonado	Uruguay	+ 5' 59"
125	Nicholas Schultz	Australia	+ 6' 25"
126	Gregory Daniel	United States	
127	Stepan Astafyev	Kazakhstan	
128	Daniel López Parada	Spain	+ 7' 21"
129	Mario Spengler	Switzerland	+ 7' 32"
130	Patrick Müller	Switzerland	
131	Nathan Van Hooydonck	Belgium	
132	Pascal Eenkhoorn	Netherlands	
133	Nuno Bico	Portugal	
134	Wan Yau Lau	Hong Kong	
135	Sean MacKinnon	Canada	
136	Aviv Yechezkel	Israel	
137	Jaime Castrillo	Spain	+ 8' 05"
138	Dusan Kalaba	Serbia	
139	David Jabuka	Croatia	+ 8' 39"
140	Tom Wirtgen	Luxembourg	+ 10' 11"
141	Pit Leyder	Luxembourg	
142	Ēriks Toms Gavars	Latvia	+ 10' 29"
143	Dzmitry Zhyhunou	Belarus	
144	Jai Hindley	Australia	+ 13' 23"
145	Michael Kukrle	Czech Republic	+ 15' 16"
146	Dilmurodjon Siddikov	Uzbekistan	+ 15' 36"
147	Fung Ka Hoo	Hong Kong	
148	Meron Arham Brhane	Eritrea	
149	Getachow Yohannes Atsbha	Ethiopia	
DNF	Mehdi Rajabi	Iran	
DNF	Mateo Frankovic	Croatia	
DNF	Martin Otoničar	Slovenia	
DNF	Henrik Evensen	Norway	
DNF	Bryan Gómez	Colombia	
DNF	Lucas Hamilton	Australia	
DNF	Nicolas Masbourian	Canada	
DNF	Roman Lehky	Czech Republic	
DNF	Alec Cowan	Canada	
DNF	Timur Maleev	Ukraine	
DNF	Omer Goldshtein	Israel	
DNF	Maral-Erdene Batmunkh	Mongolia	
DNF	Amanuel Gebrezgabihier	Eritrea	
DNF	Jenthe Biermans	Belgium	
DNF	Filippo Ganna	Italy	
DNF	Chiu Ho San	Hong Kong	
DNF	Bilguunjargal Erdenebat	Mongolia	
DNF	Enver Asanov	Azerbaijan	
DNF	Enkhtaivan Bolor-Erdene	Mongolia	
DNF	Islam Shawky	Egypt	
DNF	Abdulhadi Alajmi	Kuwait	
DNF	Alexei Shnyrko	Belarus	
DNF	Jose Alexis Rodriguez	Costa Rica	
DNF	Daniel Jara	Costa Rica	
DNF	Akramjon Sunnatov	Uzbekistan	
DNF	Zemenfes Solmon	Eritrea	
DNF	Ali Nouisri	Tunisia	
DNF	Gabriel Marin	Costa Rica	
DNF	Guy Sagiv	Israel	
DNF	Ali Moslim	Kuwait	
DNF	Vasili Strokau	Belarus	
DNF	Elias Abou Rachid	Lebanon	
DNF	Pavol Kvietok	Slovakia	
DNF	Rinat Udod	Ukraine	
DNF	Nazar Lahodych	Ukraine	
DNF	Kanan Gahramanli	Azerbaijan	
DNF	Khaled Alkhalaifah	Kuwait	
DNS	Scott Davies	United Kingdom	
DNS	Marcus Fåglum	Sweden	
