= 2021 Okolo Slovenska =

2021 UCI Europe Tour

Race details
- Dates: 15–19 September 2021
- Stages: 4 + Prologue
- Distance: 692.1 km (430.1 mi)
- Winning time: 15h 51' 00"

Results
Jersey awarded to the overall winner	Winner	Peter Sagan (SVK)	(Bora–Hansgrohe)
	Second	Jannik Steimle (GER)	(Deceuninck–Quick-Step)
	Third	Cees Bol (NED)	(Team DSM)
Jersey awarded to the points classification winner	Points	Peter Sagan (SVK)	(Bora–Hansgrohe)
Jersey awarded to the mountains classification winner	Mountains	Andrea Garosio (ITA)	(Bardiani–CSF–Faizanè)
Jersey awarded to the young rider classification winner	Young rider	Idar Andersen (NOR)	(Uno-X Pro Cycling Team)
Jersey awarded to the combativity classification winner	Combativity	Andrea Garosio (ITA)	(Bardiani–CSF–Faizanè)
	Team	Team DSM	

The 2021 Okolo Slovenska (transl. Tour of Slovakia) was the 65th edition of the Okolo Slovenska road cycling stage race. It was held from 15 and 19 September 2021, as a category 2.1 event on the 2021 UCI Europe Tour.

== Teams ==
Seven of the nineteen UCI WorldTeams, five UCI ProTeams, eight UCI Continental teams, and the Slovak national team made up the twenty-one teams that participated in the race. All but two teams entered a full squad of seven riders: Adria Mobil entered six, while Cycling Team Friuli ASD entered five. In total, 144 riders started the race, of which 105 finished.

UCI WorldTeams

- Astana–Premier Tech
- Bora–Hansgrohe
- Deceuninck–Quick-Step
- Israel Start-Up Nation
- Team BikeExchange
- Team DSM
- Team Qhubeka NextHash

UCI ProTeams

- Bardiani–CSF–Faizanè
- Equipo Kern Pharma
- Gazprom–RusVelo
- Team Novo Nordisk
- Uno-X Pro Cycling Team

UCI Continental Teams

- Adria Mobil
- Cycling Academy Trenčín
- Cycling Team Friuli ASD
- Dukla Banská Bystrica
- Elkov–Kasper
- HRE Mazowsze Serce Polski
- Maloja Pushbikers
- Topforex–ATT Investments

National Teams

- Slovakia

== Route ==
Stage characteristics and winners
Stage	Date	Route	Distance	Type	Winner
P	15 September	Košice	1.6 km (0.99 mi)	Individual time trial	Kaden Groves (AUS)
1	16 September	Košice to Košice	158.4 km (98.4 mi)	Hilly stage	Álvaro Hodeg (COL)
2	17 September	Spišské Podhradie to Dolný Kubín	179.7 km (111.7 mi)	Mountain stage	Jannik Steimle (GER)
3	18 September	Dolný Kubín to Považská Bystrica	193.2 km (120.0 mi)	Hilly stage	Kristoffer Halvorsen (NOR)
4	19 September	Trenčianske Teplice to Trnava	159.2 km (98.9 mi)	Flat stage	Itamar Einhorn (ISR)
Total			692.1 km (430.1 mi)		

== Stages ==
=== Prologue ===
15 September 2021 — Košice, 1.6 km (0.99 mi) (ITT)

Prologue Result
Rank	Rider	Team	Time
1	Kaden Groves (AUS)	Team BikeExchange	1' 50"
2	Jannik Steimle (GER)	Deceuninck–Quick-Step	+ 0"
3	Marceli Bogusławski (POL)	HRE Mazowsze Serce Polski	+ 1"
4	Cees Bol (NED)	Team DSM	+ 1"
5	Álvaro Hodeg (COL)	Deceuninck–Quick-Step	+ 1"
6	Casper Pedersen (DEN)	Team DSM	+ 1"
7	Maciej Bodnar (POL)	Bora–Hansgrohe	+ 2"
8	Frederik Rodenberg (DEN)	Uno-X Pro Cycling Team	+ 2"
9	Jason Osborne (GER)	Deceuninck–Quick-Step	+ 2"
10	Peter Sagan (SVK)	Bora–Hansgrohe	+ 3"

General classification after Prologue
Rank	Rider	Team	Time
1	Kaden Groves (AUS)	Team BikeExchange	1' 50"
2	Jannik Steimle (GER)	Deceuninck–Quick-Step	+ 0"
3	Marceli Bogusławski (POL)	HRE Mazowsze Serce Polski	+ 1"
4	Cees Bol (NED)	Team DSM	+ 1"
5	Álvaro Hodeg (COL)	Deceuninck–Quick-Step	+ 1"
6	Casper Pedersen (DEN)	Team DSM	+ 1"
7	Maciej Bodnar (POL)	Bora–Hansgrohe	+ 2"
8	Frederik Rodenberg (DEN)	Uno-X Pro Cycling Team	+ 2"
9	Jason Osborne (GER)	Deceuninck–Quick-Step	+ 2"
10	Peter Sagan (SVK)	Bora–Hansgrohe	+ 3"

=== Stage 1 ===
16 September 2021 — Košice to Košice, 158.4 km (98.4 mi)

Stage 1 Result
Rank	Rider	Team	Time
1	Álvaro Hodeg (COL)	Deceuninck–Quick-Step	3h 34' 38"
2	Peter Sagan (SVK)	Bora–Hansgrohe	+ 0"
3	Reinardt Janse van Rensburg (RSA)	Team Qhubeka NextHash	+ 0"
4	Cees Bol (NED)	Team DSM	+ 0"
5	Michael Mørkøv (DEN)	Deceuninck–Quick-Step	+ 0"
6	Itamar Einhorn (ISR)	Israel Start-Up Nation	+ 0"
7	Luca Coati (ITA)	Team Qhubeka NextHash	+ 0"
8	Dominik Neuman (CZE)	Elkov–Kasper	+ 0"
9	Norman Vahtra (EST)	Israel Start-Up Nation	+ 0"
10	Kiko Galván (ESP)	Equipo Kern Pharma	+ 0"

General classification after Stage 1
Rank	Rider	Team	Time
1	Álvaro Hodeg (COL)	Deceuninck–Quick-Step	3h 36' 19"
2	Peter Sagan (SVK)	Bora–Hansgrohe	+ 6"
3	Eirik Lunder (NOR)	Gazprom–RusVelo	+ 8"
4	Kaden Groves (AUS)	Team BikeExchange	+ 9"
5	Roger Adrià (ESP)	Equipo Kern Pharma	+ 9"
6	Jannik Steimle (GER)	Deceuninck–Quick-Step	+ 9"
7	Reinardt Janse van Rensburg (RSA)	Team Qhubeka NextHash	+ 10"
8	Cees Bol (NED)	Team DSM	+ 10"
9	Casper Pedersen (DEN)	Team DSM	+ 10"
10	Maciej Bodnar (POL)	Bora–Hansgrohe	+ 11"

=== Stage 2 ===
17 September 2021 — Spišské Podhradie to Dolný Kubín, 179.7 km (111.7 mi)

Stage 2 Result
Rank	Rider	Team	Time
1	Jannik Steimle (GER)	Deceuninck–Quick-Step	4h 18' 30"
2	Peter Sagan (SVK)	Bora–Hansgrohe	+ 0"
3	Álvaro Hodeg (COL)	Deceuninck–Quick-Step	+ 0"
4	Lukáš Kubiš (SVK)	Dukla Banská Bystrica	+ 0"
5	Kiko Galván (ESP)	Equipo Kern Pharma	+ 0"
6	Gal Glivar (SLO)	Adria Mobil	+ 0"
7	Fabio Felline (ITA)	Astana–Premier Tech	+ 0"
8	Alexey Lutsenko (KAZ)	Astana–Premier Tech	+ 0"
9	Matúš Štoček (SVK)	Topforex–ATT Investments	+ 0"
10	Idar Andersen (NOR)	Uno-X Pro Cycling Team	+ 0"

General classification after Stage 2
Rank	Rider	Team	Time
1	Álvaro Hodeg (COL)	Deceuninck–Quick-Step	7h 54' 45"
2	Jannik Steimle (GER)	Deceuninck–Quick-Step	+ 3"
3	Peter Sagan (SVK)	Bora–Hansgrohe	+ 4"
4	Eirik Lunder (NOR)	Gazprom–RusVelo	+ 12"
5	Jakub Otruba (CZE)	Elkov–Kasper	+ 13"
6	Roger Adrià (ESP)	Equipo Kern Pharma	+ 13"
7	Cees Bol (NED)	Team DSM	+ 14"
8	Casper Pedersen (DEN)	Team DSM	+ 14"
9	Maciej Bodnar (POL)	Bora–Hansgrohe	+ 15"
10	Idar Andersen (NOR)	Uno-X Pro Cycling Team	+ 15"

=== Stage 3 ===
18 September 2021 — Dolný Kubín to Považská Bystrica, 193.2 km (120.0 mi)

Stage 3 Result
Rank	Rider	Team	Time
1	Kristoffer Halvorsen (NOR)	Uno-X Pro Cycling Team	4h 28' 47"
2	Kaden Groves (AUS)	Team BikeExchange	+ 0"
3	Peter Sagan (SVK)	Bora–Hansgrohe	+ 0"
4	Álvaro Hodeg (COL)	Deceuninck–Quick-Step	+ 0"
5	Antonio Puppio (ITA)	Team Qhubeka NextHash	+ 0"
6	Giovanni Lonardi (ITA)	Bardiani–CSF–Faizanè	+ 0"
7	Itamar Einhorn (ISR)	Israel Start-Up Nation	+ 0"
8	Michael Mørkøv (DEN)	Deceuninck–Quick-Step	+ 0"
9	Adam Ťoupalík (CZE)	Elkov–Kasper	+ 0"
10	Dominik Neuman (CZE)	Elkov–Kasper	+ 0"

General classification after Stage 3
Rank	Rider	Team	Time
1	Peter Sagan (SVK)	Bora–Hansgrohe	12h 23' 30"
2	Álvaro Hodeg (COL)	Deceuninck–Quick-Step	+ 2"
3	Jannik Steimle (GER)	Deceuninck–Quick-Step	+ 5"
4	Roger Adrià (ESP)	Equipo Kern Pharma	+ 12"
5	Eirik Lunder (NOR)	Gazprom–RusVelo	+ 14"
6	Jakub Otruba (CZE)	Elkov–Kasper	+ 15"
7	Matěj Zahálka (CZE)	Elkov–Kasper	+ 16"
8	Cees Bol (NED)	Team DSM	+ 16"
9	Casper Pedersen (DEN)	Team DSM	+ 16"
10	Maciej Bodnar (POL)	Bora–Hansgrohe	+ 17"

=== Stage 4 ===
19 September 2021 — Trenčianske Teplice to Trnava, 159.2 km (98.9 mi)

Stage 4 Result
Rank	Rider	Team	Time
1	Itamar Einhorn (ISR)	Israel Start-Up Nation	3h 27' 40"
2	Peter Sagan (SVK)	Bora–Hansgrohe	+ 0"
3	Cees Bol (NED)	Team DSM	+ 0"
4	Jannik Steimle (GER)	Deceuninck–Quick-Step	+ 0"
5	Kaden Groves (AUS)	Team BikeExchange	+ 0"
6	Fabio Felline (ITA)	Astana–Premier Tech	+ 0"
7	Alexander Konychev (ITA)	Team BikeExchange	+ 0"
8	Andreas Stokbro (DEN)	Team Qhubeka NextHash	+ 0"
9	Alexey Lutsenko (KAZ)	Astana–Premier Tech	+ 0"
10	Jakub Kaczmarek (POL)	HRE Mazowsze Serce Polski	+ 0"

General classification after Stage 4
Rank	Rider	Team	Time
1	Peter Sagan (SVK)	Bora–Hansgrohe	15h 51' 00"
2	Jannik Steimle (GER)	Deceuninck–Quick-Step	+ 11"
3	Cees Bol (NED)	Team DSM	+ 17"
4	Roger Adrià (ESP)	Equipo Kern Pharma	+ 22"
5	Idar Andersen (NOR)	Uno-X Pro Cycling Team	+ 24"
6	Casper Pedersen (DEN)	Team DSM	+ 26"
7	Maciej Bodnar (POL)	Bora–Hansgrohe	+ 27"
8	Alexey Lutsenko (KAZ)	Astana–Premier Tech	+ 27"
9	Fabio Felline (ITA)	Astana–Premier Tech	+ 30"
10	Niklas Märkl (GER)	Team DSM	+ 30"

== Classification leadership table ==
Classification leadership by stage
Stage	Winner	General classification	Points classification	Mountains classification	Young rider classification	Slovak rider classification (Note: The jersey for the Slovak rider classification will not be worn during the race; it will only be presented at the podium ceremony after every stage to the best placed Slovak rider in the general classification.)	Team classification	Combativity award
P	Kaden Groves	Kaden Groves	Not awarded	Not awarded	Julius Johansen	Peter Sagan	Deceuninck–Quick-Step	Not awarded
1	Álvaro Hodeg	Álvaro Hodeg	Eirik Lunder	Andrea Garosio	Eirik Lunder	Peter Sagan	Deceuninck–Quick-Step	Jaime Castrillo
2	Jannik Steimle	Álvaro Hodeg	Álvaro Hodeg	Andrea Garosio	Eirik Lunder	Peter Sagan	Team DSM	Jakub Otruba
3	Kristoffer Halvorsen	Peter Sagan	Peter Sagan	Andrea Garosio	Eirik Lunder	Peter Sagan	Team DSM	Matěj Zahálka
4	Itamar Einhorn	Peter Sagan	Peter Sagan	Andrea Garosio	Idar Andersen	Peter Sagan	Team DSM	Daniel Oss
Final		Peter Sagan	Peter Sagan	Andrea Garosio	Idar Andersen	Peter Sagan	Team DSM	Andrea Garosio

- For stage 1, per the race regulations, Jannik Steimle, the second-placed rider after the prologue, was assigned the green jersey of the leader of the points classification, and Marceli Bogusławski, the third-placed rider after the prologue, was assigned the polka-dot jersey of the leader of the mountains classification. However, neither rider was deemed to be officially leading those respective classifications, as no points were awarded in the prologue for either classification.
- On stage 2, Leon Heinschke, who was second in the young rider classification, wore the white jersey, because first-placed Eirik Lunder wore the green jersey as the leader of the points classification.
- On stage 3, Peter Sagan, who was second in the points classification, wore the green jersey, because first-placed Álvaro Hodeg wore the yellow jersey as the leader of the general classification. On stage 4, Hodeg wore the green jersey, having switched positions with Sagan in both the general and the points classifications; Sagan wore the yellow jersey.

== Final classification standings ==
Legend
Denotes the winner of the general classification	Denotes the winner of the young rider classification
Denotes the winner of the points classification	Denotes the winner of the Slovak rider classification
Denotes the winner of the mountains classification	Denotes the winner of the combativity award

=== General classification ===
Final general classification (1–10)
Rank	Rider	Team	Time
1	Peter Sagan (SVK)	Bora–Hansgrohe	15h 51' 00"
2	Jannik Steimle (GER)	Deceuninck–Quick-Step	+ 11"
3	Cees Bol (NED)	Team DSM	+ 17"
4	Roger Adrià (ESP)	Equipo Kern Pharma	+ 22"
5	Idar Andersen (NOR)	Uno-X Pro Cycling Team	+ 24"
6	Casper Pedersen (DEN)	Team DSM	+ 26"
7	Maciej Bodnar (POL)	Bora–Hansgrohe	+ 27"
8	Alexey Lutsenko (KAZ)	Astana–Premier Tech	+ 27"
9	Fabio Felline (ITA)	Astana–Premier Tech	+ 30"
10	Niklas Märkl (GER)	Team DSM	+ 30"

=== Points classification ===
Final points classification (1–10)
Rank	Rider	Team	Points
1	Peter Sagan (SVK)	Bora–Hansgrohe	58
2	Álvaro Hodeg (COL)	Deceuninck–Quick-Step	34
3	Jannik Steimle (GER)	Deceuninck–Quick-Step	32
4	Cees Bol (NED)	Team DSM	28
5	Itamar Einhorn (ISR)	Israel Start-Up Nation	24
6	Roger Adrià (ESP)	Equipo Kern Pharma	18
7	Kaden Groves (AUS)	Team BikeExchange	18
8	Eirik Lunder (NOR)	Gazprom–RusVelo	16
9	Matěj Zahálka (CZE)	Elkov–Kasper	16
10	Fredrik Dversnes (NOR)	Gazprom–RusVelo	16

=== Mountains classification ===
Final mountains classification (1–10)
Rank	Rider	Team	Points
1	Andrea Garosio (ITA)	Bardiani–CSF–Faizanè	37
2	Roger Adrià (ESP)	Equipo Kern Pharma	16
3	Tomasz Budziński (POL)	HRE Mazowsze Serce Polski	13
4	Jan Bárta (CZE)	Elkov–Kasper	12
5	Domenico Pozzovivo (ITA)	Team Qhubeka NextHash	12
6	Matěj Zahálka (CZE)	Elkov–Kasper	11
7	Fredrik Dversnes (NOR)	Gazprom–RusVelo	10
8	Peter Sagan (SVK)	Bora–Hansgrohe	9
9	Idar Andersen (NOR)	Uno-X Pro Cycling Team	8
10	Gabriele Petrelli (ITA)	Cycling Team Friuli ASD	6

=== Young rider classification ===
Final young rider classification (1–10)
Rank	Rider	Team	Time
1	Idar Andersen (NOR)	Uno-X Pro Cycling Team	15h 51' 24"
2	Niklas Märkl (GER)	Team DSM	+ 6"
3	Gabriele Petrelli (ITA)	Cycling Team Friuli ASD	+ 1' 09"
4	Eirik Lunder (NOR)	Gazprom–RusVelo	+ 9' 03"
5	Leon Heinschke (GER)	Team DSM	+ 9' 07"
6	Lukáš Kubiš (SVK)	Dukla Banská Bystrica	+ 9' 09"
7	Matúš Štoček (SVK)	Topforex–ATT Investments	+ 9' 10"
8	Gleb Brussenskiy (KAZ)	Astana–Premier Tech	+ 9' 10"
9	Antonio Puppio (ITA)	Team Qhubeka NextHash	+ 9' 11"
10	Aljaž Jarc (SLO)	Adria Mobil	+ 9' 12"

=== Slovak rider classification ===
Final Slovak rider classification (1–10)
Rank	Rider	Team	Time
1	Peter Sagan (SVK)	Bora–Hansgrohe	15h 51' 00"
2	Lukáš Kubiš (SVK)	Dukla Banská Bystrica	+ 9' 33"
3	Matúš Štoček (SVK)	Topforex–ATT Investments	+ 9' 34"
4	Marek Čanecký (SVK)	Dukla Banská Bystrica	+ 9' 38"
5	Juraj Sagan (SVK)	Bora–Hansgrohe	+ 14' 26"
6	Erik Baška (SVK)	Bora–Hansgrohe	+ 19' 22"
7	Filip Lohinský (SVK)	Slovakia	+ 19' 29"
8	Samuel Oros (SVK)	Cycling Academy Trenčín	+ 19' 57"
9	Patrik Tybor (SVK)	Dukla Banská Bystrica	+ 20' 05"
10	Tobias Vančo (SVK)	Dukla Banská Bystrica	+ 25' 56"

=== Team classification ===
Final team classification (1–10)
Rank	Team	Time
1	Team DSM	47h 34' 20"
2	Team BikeExchange	+ 6"
3	Team Qhubeka NextHash	+ 12"
4	Bora–Hansgrohe	+ 22"
5	Israel Start-Up Nation	+ 3' 39"
6	Astana–Premier Tech	+ 9' 13"
7	Elkov–Kasper	+ 9' 16"
8	HRE Mazowsze Serce Polski	+ 18' 11"
9	Gazprom–RusVelo	+ 18' 19"
10	Deceuninck–Quick-Step	+ 19' 02"
