= 2019 BinckBank Tour =

2019 UCI World Tour, race 31 of 38

Race details
- Dates: 12–18 August 2019
- Stages: 7
- Distance: 970.55 km (603.1 mi)
- Winning time: 21h 29' 55"

Results
| Jersey awarded to the overall winner | Winner | Laurens De Plus (BEL) | (Team Jumbo–Visma) |
| | Second | Oliver Naesen (BEL) | (AG2R La Mondiale) |
| | Third | Tim Wellens (BEL) | (Lotto–Soudal) |
| Jersey awarded to the points classification winner | Points | Sam Bennett (IRL) | (Bora–Hansgrohe) |
| Jersey awarded to the combativity classification winner | Combativity | Baptiste Planckaert (BEL) | (Wallonie Bruxelles) |
| | Team | Team Sunweb | |

The 2019 BinckBank Tour was a road cycling stage race that took place between 12 and 18 August 2019 in Belgium and the Netherlands. It was the 15th edition of the BinckBank Tour and the thirty-first event of the 2019 UCI World Tour. It was won by Laurens De Plus.

== Teams ==
All UCI WorldTeams were invited as the race is part of the UCI World Tour. The race organisation also gave out wildcards to five UCI Professional Continental teams.

UCI WorldTeams

- AG2R La Mondiale
- Astana
- Bahrain–Merida
- Bora–Hansgrohe
- CCC Team
- Deceuninck–Quick-Step
- EF Education First
- Groupama–FDJ
- Lotto–Soudal
- Mitchelton–Scott
- Movistar Team
- Team Dimension Data
- Team Ineos
- Team Jumbo–Visma
- Team Katusha–Alpecin
- Team Sunweb
- Trek–Segafredo
- UAE Team Emirates

UCI Professional Continental Teams

- Roompot–Charles
- Sport Vlaanderen–Baloise
- Total Direct Énergie
- Wallonie Bruxelles
- Wanty–Gobert

== Schedule ==
The race organisation announced the full schedule in June 2019.

| Stage | Date | Route | Distance | Type | Winner |
|---|---|---|---|---|---|
| 1 | 12 August | Beveren (Belgium) to Hulst (Netherlands) | 167.7 km (104 mi) | Flat stage | Sam Bennett (IRL) |
| 2 | 13 August | Blankenberge (Belgium) to Ardooie (Belgium) | 167.9 km (104 mi) | Flat stage | Sam Bennett (IRL) |
| 3 | 14 August | Aalter (Belgium) to Aalter (Belgium) | 166.9 km (104 mi) | Flat stage | Sam Bennett (IRL) |
| 4 | 15 August | Houffalize (Belgium) to Houffalize (Belgium) | 96.2 km (60 mi) | Hilly stage | Tim Wellens (BEL) |
| 5 | 16 August | Riemst (Belgium) to Venray (Netherlands) | 184.9 km (115 mi) | Flat stage | Álvaro Hodeg (COL) |
| 6 | 17 August | The Hague (Netherlands) to The Hague (Netherlands) | 8.35 km (5 mi) | Individual time trial | Filippo Ganna (ITA) |
| 7 | 18 August | Sint-Pieters-Leeuw (Belgium) to Geraardsbergen (Belgium) | 178.6 km (111 mi) | Hilly stage | Oliver Naesen (BEL) |
| Total | | 970.55 km (603.1 mi) | | | |

== Stages ==
=== Stage 1 ===
12 August 2019 – Beveren to Hulst, 167.7 km (104 mi)

Stage 1 result
| Rank | Rider | Team | Time |
|---|---|---|---|
| 1 | Sam Bennett (IRL) | Bora–Hansgrohe | 3h 42' 57" |
| 2 | Edward Theuns (BEL) | Trek–Segafredo | + 0" |
| 3 | Mike Teunissen (NED) | Team Jumbo–Visma | + 0" |
| 4 | Jasper Philipsen (BEL) | UAE Team Emirates | + 0" |
| 5 | Phil Bauhaus (GER) | Bahrain–Merida | + 0" |
| 6 | Timothy Dupont (BEL) | Wanty–Gobert | + 0" |
| 7 | Dylan Groenewegen (NED) | Team Jumbo–Visma | + 0" |
| 8 | Kristoffer Halvorsen (NOR) | Team Ineos | + 0" |
| 9 | Álvaro Hodeg (COL) | Deceuninck–Quick-Step | + 0" |
| 10 | Amaury Capiot (BEL) | Sport Vlaanderen–Baloise | + 0" |

General classification after Stage 1
| Rank | Rider | Team | Time |
|---|---|---|---|
| 1 | Sam Bennett (IRL) | Bora–Hansgrohe | 3h 42' 47" |
| 2 | Łukasz Wiśniowski (POL) | CCC Team | + 2" |
| 3 | Lars Ytting Bak (DEN) | Lotto–Soudal | + 3" |
| 4 | Edward Theuns (BEL) | Trek–Segafredo | + 4" |
| 5 | Mike Teunissen (NED) | Team Jumbo–Visma | + 6" |
| 6 | Jasper Philipsen (BEL) | UAE Team Emirates | + 10" |
| 7 | Phil Bauhaus (GER) | Bahrain–Merida | + 10" |
| 8 | Timothy Dupont (BEL) | Wanty–Gobert | + 10" |
| 9 | Dylan Groenewegen (NED) | Team Jumbo–Visma | + 10" |
| 10 | Kristoffer Halvorsen (NOR) | Team Ineos | + 10" |

=== Stage 2 ===
13 August 2019 – Blankenberge to Ardooie, 167.9 km (104 mi)

Stage 2 result
| Rank | Rider | Team | Time |
|---|---|---|---|
| 1 | Sam Bennett (IRL) | Bora–Hansgrohe | 3h 45' 20" |
| 2 | Jasper Philipsen (BEL) | UAE Team Emirates | + 0" |
| 3 | Dylan Groenewegen (NED) | Team Jumbo–Visma | + 0" |
| 4 | Kristoffer Halvorsen (NOR) | Team Ineos | + 0" |
| 5 | Álvaro Hodeg (COL) | Deceuninck–Quick-Step | + 0" |
| 6 | Amaury Capiot (BEL) | Sport Vlaanderen–Baloise | + 0" |
| 7 | Phil Bauhaus (GER) | Bahrain–Merida | + 0" |
| 8 | Nikolas Maes (BEL) | Lotto–Soudal | + 0" |
| 9 | Arnaud Démare (FRA) | Groupama–FDJ | + 0" |
| 10 | Timothy Dupont (BEL) | Wanty–Gobert | + 0" |

General classification after Stage 2
| Rank | Rider | Team | Time |
|---|---|---|---|
| 1 | Sam Bennett (IRL) | Bora–Hansgrohe | 7h 27' 57" |
| 2 | Łukasz Wiśniowski (POL) | CCC Team | + 12" |
| 3 | Lars Ytting Bak (DEN) | Lotto–Soudal | + 13" |
| 4 | Josef Černý (CZE) | CCC Team | + 13" |
| 5 | Jasper Philipsen (BEL) | UAE Team Emirates | + 14" |
| 6 | Edward Theuns (BEL) | Trek–Segafredo | + 14" |
| 7 | Robert Stannard (AUS) | Mitchelton–Scott | + 14" |
| 8 | Dylan Groenewegen (NED) | Team Jumbo–Visma | + 16" |
| 9 | Mike Teunissen (NED) | Team Jumbo–Visma | + 16" |
| 10 | Thomas Sprengers (BEL) | Sport Vlaanderen–Baloise | + 17" |

=== Stage 3 ===
14 August 2019 – Aalter to Aalter, 166.9 km (104 mi)

Stage 3 result
| Rank | Rider | Team | Time |
|---|---|---|---|
| 1 | Sam Bennett (IRL) | Bora–Hansgrohe | 3h 48' 36" |
| 2 | Dylan Groenewegen (NED) | Team Jumbo–Visma | + 0" |
| 3 | Jasper Philipsen (BEL) | UAE Team Emirates | + 0" |
| 4 | Jürgen Roelandts (BEL) | Movistar Team | + 0" |
| 5 | Florian Sénéchal (FRA) | Deceuninck–Quick-Step | + 0" |
| 6 | Edward Theuns (BEL) | Trek–Segafredo | + 0" |
| 7 | Timothy Dupont (BEL) | Wanty–Gobert | + 0" |
| 8 | Jakub Mareczko (ITA) | CCC Team | + 0" |
| 9 | Arnaud Démare (FRA) | Groupama–FDJ | + 0" |
| 10 | Amaury Capiot (BEL) | Sport Vlaanderen–Baloise | + 0" |

General classification after Stage 3
| Rank | Rider | Team | Time |
|---|---|---|---|
| 1 | Sam Bennett (IRL) | Bora–Hansgrohe | 11h 16' 23" |
| 2 | Jasper Philipsen (BEL) | UAE Team Emirates | + 20" |
| 3 | Dylan Groenewegen (NED) | Team Jumbo–Visma | + 20" |
| 4 | Łukasz Wiśniowski (POL) | CCC Team | + 22" |
| 5 | Guillaume Van Keirsbulck (BEL) | CCC Team | + 22" |
| 6 | Lars Ytting Bak (DEN) | Lotto–Soudal | + 23" |
| 7 | Josef Černý (CZE) | CCC Team | + 23" |
| 8 | Harry Tanfield (GBR) | Team Katusha–Alpecin | + 23" |
| 9 | Edward Theuns (BEL) | Trek–Segafredo | + 24" |
| 10 | Robert Stannard (AUS) | Mitchelton–Scott | + 24" |

=== Stage 4 ===
15 August 2019 – Houffalize to Houffalize, 96.2 km (60 mi)

Stage 4 result
| Rank | Rider | Team | Time |
|---|---|---|---|
| 1 | Tim Wellens (BEL) | Lotto–Soudal | 2h 20' 41" |
| 2 | Marc Hirschi (SUI) | Team Sunweb | + 0" |
| 3 | Laurens De Plus (BEL) | Team Jumbo–Visma | + 5" |
| 4 | Iván García (ESP) | Bahrain–Merida | + 23" |
| 5 | Oliver Naesen (BEL) | AG2R La Mondiale | + 23" |
| 6 | Michael Valgren (DEN) | Team Dimension Data | + 26" |
| 7 | Mike Teunissen (NED) | Team Jumbo–Visma | + 33" |
| 8 | Søren Kragh Andersen (DEN) | Team Sunweb | + 33" |
| 9 | Dion Smith (NZL) | Mitchelton–Scott | + 33" |
| 10 | Greg Van Avermaet (BEL) | CCC Team | + 33" |

General classification after Stage 4
| Rank | Rider | Team | Time |
|---|---|---|---|
| 1 | Tim Wellens (BEL) | Lotto–Soudal | 13h 32' 46" |
| 2 | Marc Hirschi (SUI) | Team Sunweb | + 4" |
| 3 | Laurens De Plus (BEL) | Team Jumbo–Visma | + 14" |
| 4 | Iván García (ESP) | Bahrain–Merida | + 36" |
| 5 | Oliver Naesen (BEL) | AG2R La Mondiale | + 39" |
| 6 | Michael Valgren (DEN) | Team Dimension Data | + 42" |
| 7 | Mike Teunissen (NED) | Team Jumbo–Visma | + 45" |
| 8 | Greg Van Avermaet (BEL) | CCC Team | + 49" |
| 9 | Simon Clarke (AUS) | EF Education First | + 49" |
| 10 | Søren Kragh Andersen (DEN) | Team Sunweb | + 49" |

=== Stage 5 ===
16 August 2019 – Riemst to Venray, 184.9 km (115 mi)

Stage 5 result
| Rank | Rider | Team | Time |
|---|---|---|---|
| 1 | Álvaro Hodeg (COL) | Deceuninck–Quick-Step | 3h 54' 48" |
| 2 | Sam Bennett (IRL) | Bora–Hansgrohe | + 0" |
| 3 | Edward Theuns (BEL) | Trek–Segafredo | + 0" |
| 4 | Timothy Dupont (BEL) | Wanty–Gobert | + 0" |
| 5 | Arnaud Démare (FRA) | Groupama–FDJ | + 0" |
| 6 | Kristoffer Halvorsen (NOR) | Team Ineos | + 0" |
| 7 | Dylan Groenewegen (NED) | Team Jumbo–Visma | + 0" |
| 8 | Stan Dewulf (BEL) | Lotto–Soudal | + 0" |
| 9 | Boris Vallée (BEL) | Wanty–Gobert | + 0" |
| 10 | Boy van Poppel (NED) | Roompot–Charles | + 0" |

General classification after Stage 5
| Rank | Rider | Team | Time |
|---|---|---|---|
| 1 | Tim Wellens (BEL) | Lotto–Soudal | 17h 27' 34" |
| 2 | Marc Hirschi (SUI) | Team Sunweb | + 4" |
| 3 | Laurens De Plus (BEL) | Team Jumbo–Visma | + 14" |
| 4 | Iván García (ESP) | Bahrain–Merida | + 36" |
| 5 | Oliver Naesen (BEL) | AG2R La Mondiale | + 39" |
| 6 | Michael Valgren (DEN) | Team Dimension Data | + 42" |
| 7 | Mike Teunissen (NED) | Team Jumbo–Visma | + 45" |
| 8 | Greg Van Avermaet (BEL) | CCC Team | + 49" |
| 9 | Simon Clarke (AUS) | EF Education First | + 49" |
| 10 | Søren Kragh Andersen (DEN) | Team Sunweb | + 49" |

=== Stage 6 ===
17 August 2019 – The Hague, 8.35 km (5 mi), individual time trial (ITT)

Stage 6 result
| Rank | Rider | Team | Time |
|---|---|---|---|
| 1 | Filippo Ganna (ITA) | Team Ineos | 9' 16" |
| 2 | Edoardo Affini (ITA) | Mitchelton–Scott | + 5" |
| 3 | Jos van Emden (NED) | Team Jumbo–Visma | + 8" |
| 4 | Stefan Küng (SUI) | Groupama–FDJ | + 11" |
| 5 | Harry Tanfield (GBR) | Team Katusha–Alpecin | + 15" |
| 6 | Bob Jungels (LUX) | Deceuninck–Quick-Step | + 16" |
| 7 | Mads Pedersen (DEN) | Trek–Segafredo | + 16" |
| 8 | Søren Kragh Andersen (DEN) | Team Sunweb | + 16" |
| 9 | Laurens De Plus (BEL) | Team Jumbo–Visma | + 18" |
| 10 | Tim Wellens (BEL) | Lotto–Soudal | + 20" |

General classification after Stage 6
| Rank | Rider | Team | Time |
|---|---|---|---|
| 1 | Tim Wellens (BEL) | Lotto–Soudal | 17h 37' 10" |
| 2 | Marc Hirschi (SUI) | Team Sunweb | + 8" |
| 3 | Laurens De Plus (BEL) | Team Jumbo–Visma | + 12" |
| 4 | Stefan Küng (SUI) | Groupama–FDJ | + 40" |
| 5 | Iván García (ESP) | Bahrain–Merida | + 43" |
| 6 | Mike Teunissen (NED) | Team Jumbo–Visma | + 45" |
| 7 | Søren Kragh Andersen (DEN) | Team Sunweb | + 45" |
| 8 | Fabio Felline (ITA) | Trek–Segafredo | + 49" |
| 9 | Michael Valgren (DEN) | Team Dimension Data | + 53" |
| 10 | Greg Van Avermaet (BEL) | CCC Team | + 54" |

=== Stage 7 ===
18 August 2019 – Sint-Pieters-Leeuw to Geraardsbergen, 178.6 km (111 mi)

Stage 7 result
| Rank | Rider | Team | Time |
|---|---|---|---|
| 1 | Oliver Naesen (BEL) | AG2R La Mondiale | 3h 52' 40" |
| 2 | Greg van Avermaet (BEL) | CCC Team | + 0" |
| 3 | Laurens De Plus (BEL) | Team Jumbo–Visma | + 4" |
| 4 | Simon Clarke (AUS) | EF Education First | + 25" |
| 5 | Philippe Gilbert (BEL) | Deceuninck–Quick-Step | + 26" |
| 6 | Mike Teunissen (NED) | Team Jumbo–Visma | + 26" |
| 7 | Michael Valgren (DEN) | Team Dimension Data | + 35" |
| 8 | Iván García (ESP) | Bahrain–Merida | + 35" |
| 9 | Amaury Capiot (BEL) | Sport Vlaanderen–Baloise | + 38" |
| 10 | Dylan van Baarle (NED) | Team Ineos | + 38" |

General classification after Stage 7
| Rank | Rider | Team | Time |
|---|---|---|---|
| 1 | Laurens De Plus (BEL) | Team Jumbo–Visma | 21h 29' 55" |
| 2 | Oliver Naesen (BEL) | AG2R La Mondiale | + 35" |
| 3 | Tim Wellens (BEL) | Lotto–Soudal | + 36" |
| 4 | Greg Van Avermaet (BEL) | CCC Team | + 37" |
| 5 | Marc Hirschi (SUI) | Team Sunweb | + 44" |
| 6 | Mike Teunissen (NED) | Team Jumbo–Visma | + 1' 06" |
| 7 | Iván García (ESP) | Bahrain–Merida | + 1' 13" |
| 8 | Stefan Küng (SUI) | Groupama–FDJ | + 1' 16" |
| 9 | Simon Clarke (AUS) | EF Education First | + 1' 19" |
| 10 | Michael Valgren (DEN) | Team Dimension Data | + 1' 21" |

== Classification leadership table ==
There are four principal classifications in the race. The first of these is the general classification, calculated by adding up the time each rider took to ride each stage. Time bonuses are applied for winning stages (10, 6 and 4 seconds to the first three riders) and for the three "golden kilometre" sprints on each stage. At each of these sprints, the first three riders are given 3-, 2- and 1-second bonuses respectively. The rider with the lowest cumulative time is the winner of the general classification. The rider leading the classification wins a green jersey.

There is also a points classification. On each road stage the riders are awarded points for finishing in the top 10 places, with other points awarded for intermediate sprints. The rider with the most accumulated points is the leader of the classification and wins the red jersey. The combativity classification is based solely on points won at the intermediate sprints; the leading rider wins the white jersey. The final classification is a team classification: on each stage the times of the best three riders on each team are added up. The team with the lowest cumulative time over the seven stages wins the team classification.

| Stage | Winner | General classification | Points classification | Combativity classification | Teams classification |
|---|---|---|---|---|---|
| 1 | Sam Bennett | Sam Bennett | Sam Bennett | Baptiste Planckaert | Sport Vlaanderen–Baloise |
| 2 | Sam Bennett | Sam Bennett | Sam Bennett | Baptiste Planckaert | Deceuninck–Quick-Step |
| 3 | Sam Bennett | Sam Bennett | Sam Bennett | Baptiste Planckaert | Sport Vlaanderen–Baloise |
| 4 | Tim Wellens | Tim Wellens | Sam Bennett | Baptiste Planckaert | Team Sunweb |
| 5 | Álvaro Hodeg | Tim Wellens | Sam Bennett | Baptiste Planckaert | Team Sunweb |
| 6 | Filippo Ganna | Tim Wellens | Sam Bennett | Baptiste Planckaert | Team Sunweb |
| 7 | Oliver Naesen | Laurens De Plus | Sam Bennett | Baptiste Planckaert | Team Sunweb |
| Final | | Laurens De Plus | Sam Bennett | Baptiste Planckaert | Team Sunweb |

== Classification standings ==
Legend
| Denotes the winner of the general classification |
| Denotes the winner of the points classification |
| Denotes the winner of the combativity classification |

=== General classification ===
Final general classification (1-10)
| Rank | Rider | Team | Time |
|---|---|---|---|
| 1 | Laurens De Plus (BEL) | Team Jumbo–Visma | 21h 29' 55" |
| 2 | Oliver Naesen (BEL) | AG2R La Mondiale | + 35" |
| 3 | Tim Wellens (BEL) | Lotto–Soudal | + 36" |
| 4 | Greg Van Avermaet (BEL) | CCC Team | + 37" |
| 5 | Marc Hirschi (SUI) | Team Sunweb | + 44" |
| 6 | Mike Teunissen (NED) | Team Jumbo–Visma | + 1' 06" |
| 7 | Iván García (ESP) | Bahrain–Merida | + 1' 13" |
| 8 | Stefan Küng (SUI) | Groupama–FDJ | + 1' 16" |
| 9 | Simon Clarke (AUS) | EF Education First | + 1' 19" |
| 10 | Michael Valgren (DEN) | Team Dimension Data | + 1' 21" |

=== Points classification ===
Final points classification (1-10)
| Rank | Rider | Team | Points |
|---|---|---|---|
| 1 | Sam Bennett (IRL) | Bora–Hansgrohe | 115 |
| 2 | Jasper Philipsen (BEL) | UAE Team Emirates | 66 |
| 3 | Edward Theuns (BEL) | Trek–Segafredo | 62 |
| 4 | Timothy Dupont (BEL) | Wanty–Gobert | 57 |
| 5 | Laurens De Plus (BEL) | Team Jumbo–Visma | 55 |
| 6 | Mike Teunissen (NED) | Team Jumbo–Visma | 50 |
| 7 | Oliver Naesen (BEL) | AG2R La Mondiale | 47 |
| 8 | Amaury Capiot (BEL) | Sport Vlaanderen–Baloise | 46 |
| 9 | Kristoffer Halvorsen (NOR) | Team Ineos | 46 |
| 10 | Tim Wellens (BEL) | Lotto–Soudal | 40 |

=== Combativity classification ===
Final combativity classification (1-10)
| Rank | Rider | Team | Points |
|---|---|---|---|
| 1 | Baptiste Planckaert (BEL) | Wallonie Bruxelles | 71 |
| 2 | Robert Stannard (AUS) | Mitchelton–Scott | 26 |
| 3 | Thomas Sprengers (BEL) | Sport Vlaanderen–Baloise | 24 |
| 4 | Aaron Verwilst (BEL) | Sport Vlaanderen–Baloise | 23 |
| 5 | Łukasz Wiśniowski (POL) | CCC Team | 19 |
| 6 | Oscar Riesebeek (NED) | Roompot–Charles | 16 |
| 7 | Laurens De Plus (BEL) | Team Jumbo–Visma | 14 |
| 8 | Stan Dewulf (BEL) | Lotto–Soudal | 12 |
| 9 | Willie Smit (RSA) | Team Katusha–Alpecin | 12 |
| 10 | Jesper Asselman (NED) | Roompot–Charles | 12 |

=== Teams classification ===
Final teams classification (1-10)
| Rank | Team | Time |
|---|---|---|
| 1 | Team Sunweb | 64h 36' 42" |
| 2 | Team Jumbo–Visma | + 1' 15" |
| 3 | Deceuninck–Quick-Step | + 1' 22" |
| 4 | Lotto–Soudal | + 5' 38" |
| 5 | AG2R La Mondiale | + 10' 52" |
| 6 | Mitchelton–Scott | + 11' 13" |
| 7 | Groupama–FDJ | + 11' 47" |
| 8 | EF Education First | + 12' 12" |
| 9 | Astana | + 13' 14" |
| 10 | Team Katusha–Alpecin | + 14' 16" |
