= Idar Andersen =

Norwegian cyclist

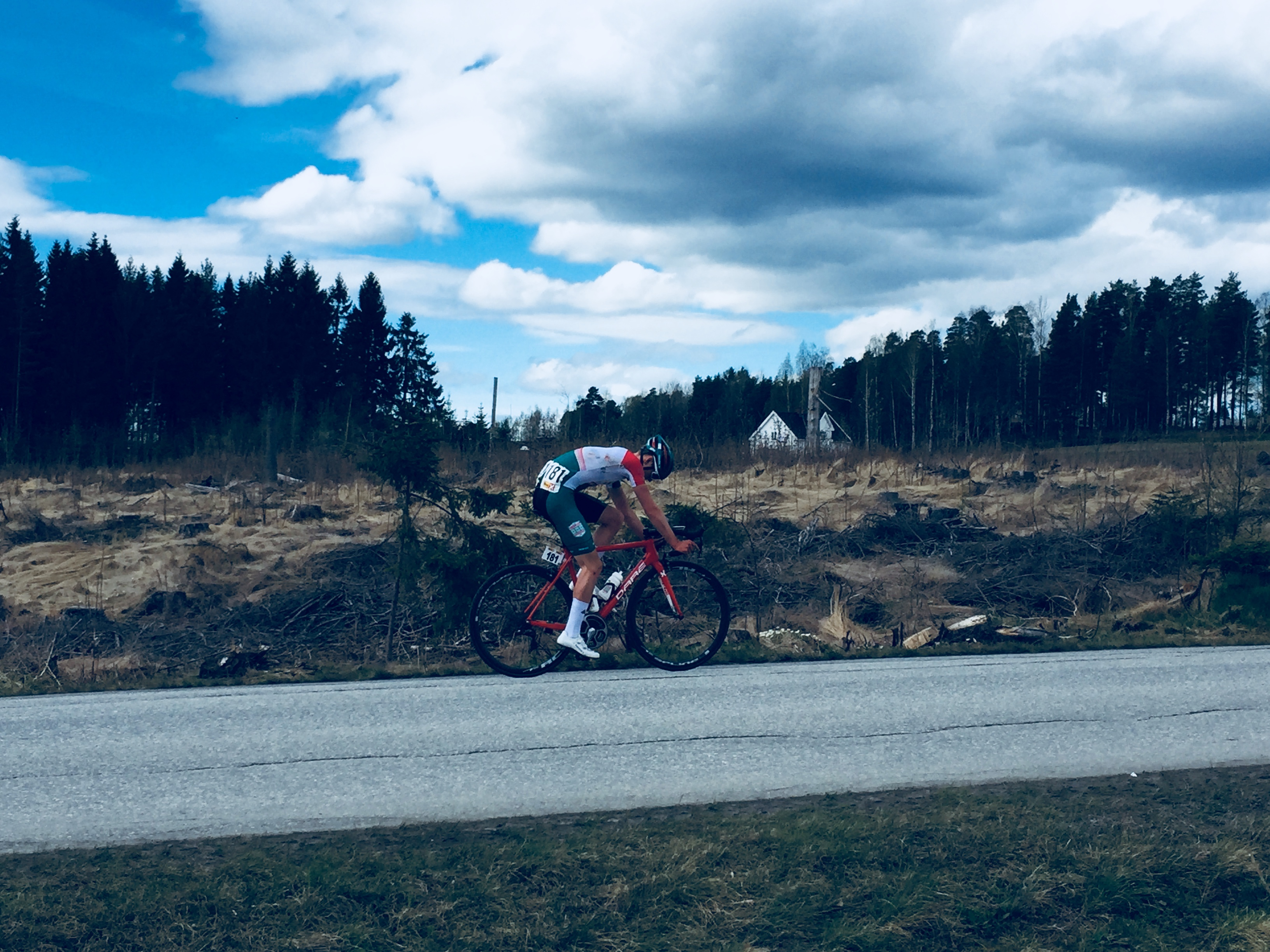
- Andersen at the 2018 Ringerike GP

Personal information
- Born: 30 April 1999 (age 27) Melhus, Norway

Cycling career
- Sport: Cycling
- Current team: Retired
- Discipline: Road
- Role: Rider

Professional team
- 2018–2024: Uno-X Norwegian Development Team

Idar Andersen (born 30 April 1999) is a Norwegian former road racing cyclist, who competed as a professional for UCI ProTeam Uno-X Mobility from 2018 to 2024.

He married the long-distance runner Hanne Mjøen Maridal in November 2024. They separated in October 2025.

== Major results ==
2017
1st Road race, National Junior Road Championships
1st Overall Course de la Paix Juniors

1st Stage 1

8th Gent-Wevelgem/Grote Prijs A. Noyelle-Ieper
2019
1st Road race, National Under-23 Road Championships
2020
1st Stage 1 (TTT) Giro della Friuli Venezia Giulia
6th Hafjell GP
2021
1st Overall Tour de la Mirabelle

1st Young rider classification
1st Prologue

1st Lillehammer GP
5th Overall Okolo Slovenska

1st Young rider classification

9th Mercan'Tour Classic Alpes-Maritimes
2022 (1 pro win)
1st Boucles de l'Aulne
8th Overall Boucles de la Mayenne
2024
1st Sundvolden GP
1st Ringerike GP
