= 2018 Handzame Classic =

2018 UCI Europe Tour

Race details
- Dates: 16 March 2018
- Stages: 1
- Distance: 200 km (124.3 mi)
- Winning time: 4h 34' 35"

Results
	Winner	Álvaro Hodeg (COL)
	Second	Kristoffer Halvorsen (NOR)
	Third	Pascal Ackermann (GER)

The 2018 Handzame Classic was the 8th edition of the Handzame Classic road cycling one day race. It was held on 16 March 2018 as part of the UCI Europe Tour in category 1.HC.

The race was won by Álvaro Hodeg of Quick-Step Floors.

== Teams ==
Twenty-two teams of up to seven riders started the race:

UCI WorldTeams

- Quick-Step Floors
- Bora–Hansgrohe
- Team Katusha–Alpecin
- Team Sky
- Lotto–Soudal
- BMC Racing Team

UCI Professional Continental teams

- Aqua Blue Sport
- Hagens Berman Axeon
- CCC–Sprandi–Polkowice
- Sport Vlaanderen–Baloise
- Roompot–Nederlandse Loterij
- Delko–Marseille Provence KTM
- WB Aqua Protect Veranclassic
- Vital Concept
- Wanty–Groupe Gobert
- Direct Énergie
- UnitedHealthcare
- Israel Cycling Academy

UCI Continental teams

- Cibel–Cebon
- Development Team Sunweb
- Tarteletto–Isorex
- Joker Icopal

== Result ==
Final general classification

Rank	Rider	Team	Time
1	Álvaro Hodeg (COL)	Quick-Step Floors	4h 34' 35"
2	Kristoffer Halvorsen (NOR)	Team Sky	s.t.
3	Pascal Ackermann (GER)	Bora–Hansgrohe	s.t.
4	Matteo Pelucchi (ITA)	Bora–Hansgrohe	s.t.
5	Adam Blythe (GBR)	Aqua Blue Sport	s.t.
6	Kenny Dehaes (BEL)	WB Aqua Protect Veranclassic	s.t.
7	Rui Oliveira (POR)	Hagens Berman Axeon	s.t.
8	Tanguy Turgis (FRA)	Vital Concept	s.t.
9	Moreno Hofland (NED)	Lotto–Soudal	s.t.
10	Jonas Koch (GER)	CCC–Sprandi–Polkowice	s.t.
