= Iván García Cortina =

Spanish bicycle racer

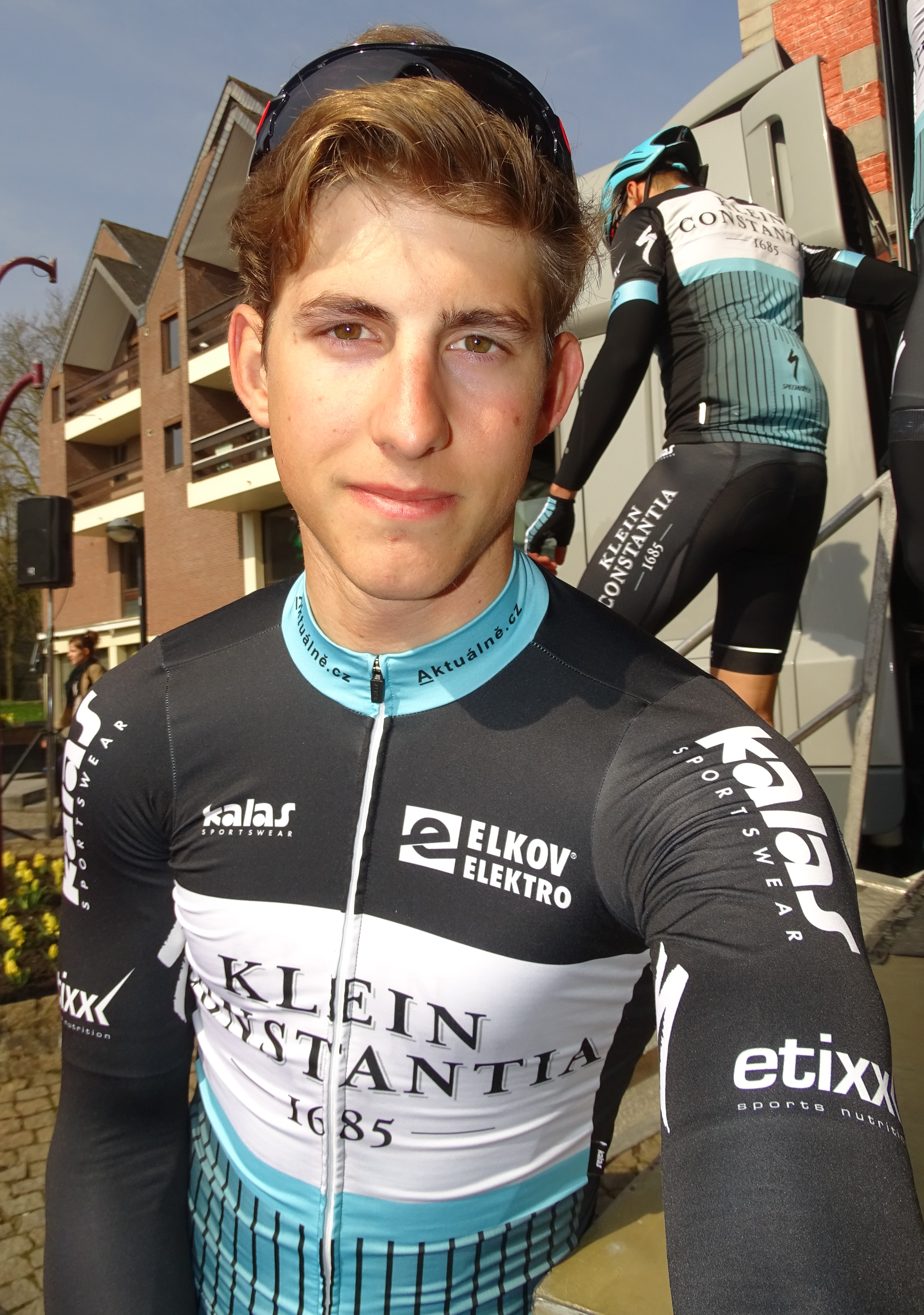
- García Cortina in 2016.

Personal information
- Full name: Iván García Cortina
- Born: 20 November 1995 (age 30) Gijón, Spain
- Height: 1.83 m (6 ft 0 in)
- Weight: 80 kg (176 lb)

Cycling career
- Sport: Cycling
- Current team: Movistar Team
- Discipline: Road
- Role: Rider
- Rider type: Sprinter; Classics specialist

Professional teams
- 2015–2016: AWT–GreenWay
- 2016: Etixx–Quick-Step (stagiaire)
- 2017–2020: Bahrain–Merida
- 2021–: Movistar Team

Major wins
- One day races and Classics Gran Piemonte (2022)

Iván García Cortina (born 20 November 1995) is a Spanish cyclist, who currently rides for UCI WorldTeam Movistar Team.

== Career ==
García Cortina signed with Bahrain–Merida for the 2017 season. He was named in the startlist for the 2017 Vuelta a España. García Cortina won the 2017 Red Hook Criterium Milan fixed gear criterium race. In July 2019, he was named in the startlist for the 2019 Tour de France.

In August 2020, it was announced that García Cortina was to join the Movistar Team on a three-year contract, from 2021.

== Major results ==
=== Gravel ===
2023

UCI World Series

2nd Hutchinson Ranxo

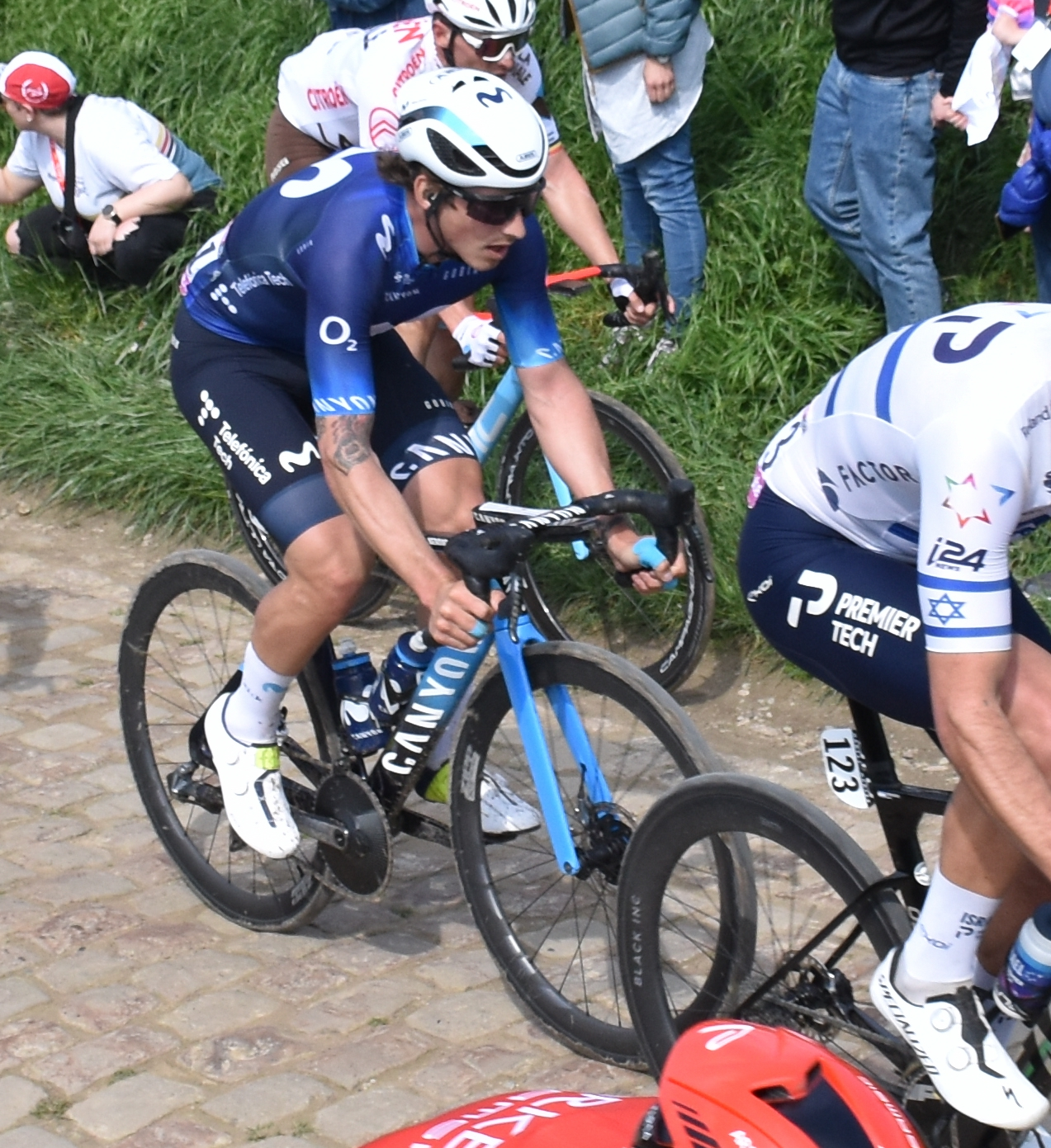
Paris-Roubaix 2023 - Secteur pavé de Quiévy à Saint-Python - N° 181 Ivan Garcia Cortina.

=== Road ===
2012
1st Road race, National Junior Championships
2015
5th Memoriał Henryka Łasaka
10th Overall Tour de Bretagne
2016
1st Stage 4 Course de la Solidarité Olympique
4th Overall Istrian Spring Trophy

1st Young rider classification

6th GP Izola
7th Road race, UCI World Under-23 Championships
8th Ronde van Vlaanderen U23
8th Poreč Trophy
10th Overall Le Triptyque des Monts et Châteaux
10th Paris–Roubaix Espoirs
2017
8th Road race, UEC European Championships
2018
4th London–Surrey Classic
2019 (1 pro win)
1st Stage 5 Tour of California
3rd Grand Prix Cycliste de Montréal
7th Overall BinckBank Tour
7th Gran Premio Bruno Beghelli
2020 (1)
1st Stage 3 Paris–Nice
4th Road race, National Championships
8th Road race, UEC European Championships
10th Bretagne Classic
2021
6th Eschborn–Frankfurt
2022 (1)
1st Gran Piemonte
4th Trofeo Alcúdia–Port d'Alcúdia
5th Grand Prix Cycliste de Québec
5th Coppa Bernocchi
8th Gent–Wevelgem
2023
4th Trofeo Palma
5th E3 Saxo Classic
7th Coppa Agostoni
2025 (1)
1st Stage 2 Vuelta a Asturias
8th Muscat Classic
9th Tour of Flanders
2026
7th Tour of Bruges

==== Grand Tour general classification results timeline ====
Grand Tour	2017	2018	2019	2020	2021	2022	2023	2024	2025
Giro d'Italia	—	—	—	—	—	—	—	—	—
Tour de France	—	—	114	—	94	—	—	—	117
Vuelta a España	100	99	—	—	—	—	72	—	107

==== Classics results timeline ====
Monument	2017	2018	2019	2020	2021	2022	2023	2024	2025
Milan–San Remo	—	—	—	93	30	23	33	—	21
Tour of Flanders	68	37	24	—	23	22	21	26	9
Paris–Roubaix	DNF	DNF	41	NH	27	25	32	63	DNF
Liège–Bastogne–Liège	—	—	—	—	—	—	—	—	—
Giro di Lombardia	—	—	—	—	—	DNF	—	—	
Classic	2017	2018	2019	2020	2021	2022	2023	2024	2025
Omloop Het Nieuwsblad	91	84	35	—	11	30	DNF	15	82
E3 Saxo Bank Classic	57	64	23	NH	27	16	5	—	25
Gent–Wevelgem	104	122	DNF	51	18	8	DNF	—	24
Eschborn–Frankfurt	—	DNF	—	NH	6	—	—	43	
Bretagne Classic	—	—	72	10	—	57	—	73	
Grand Prix Cycliste de Quebec	—	—	73	Not held		5	—	32	
Grand Prix Cycliste de Montréal	—	—	3	Not held		DNF	—	DNF	
Gran Piemonte	—	—	—	—	—	1	72	48	

Legend
—	Did not compete
DNF	Did not finish
