= 2019 Grand Prix Cycliste de Montréal =

Cycling race

2019 UCI World Tour, race 36 of 38
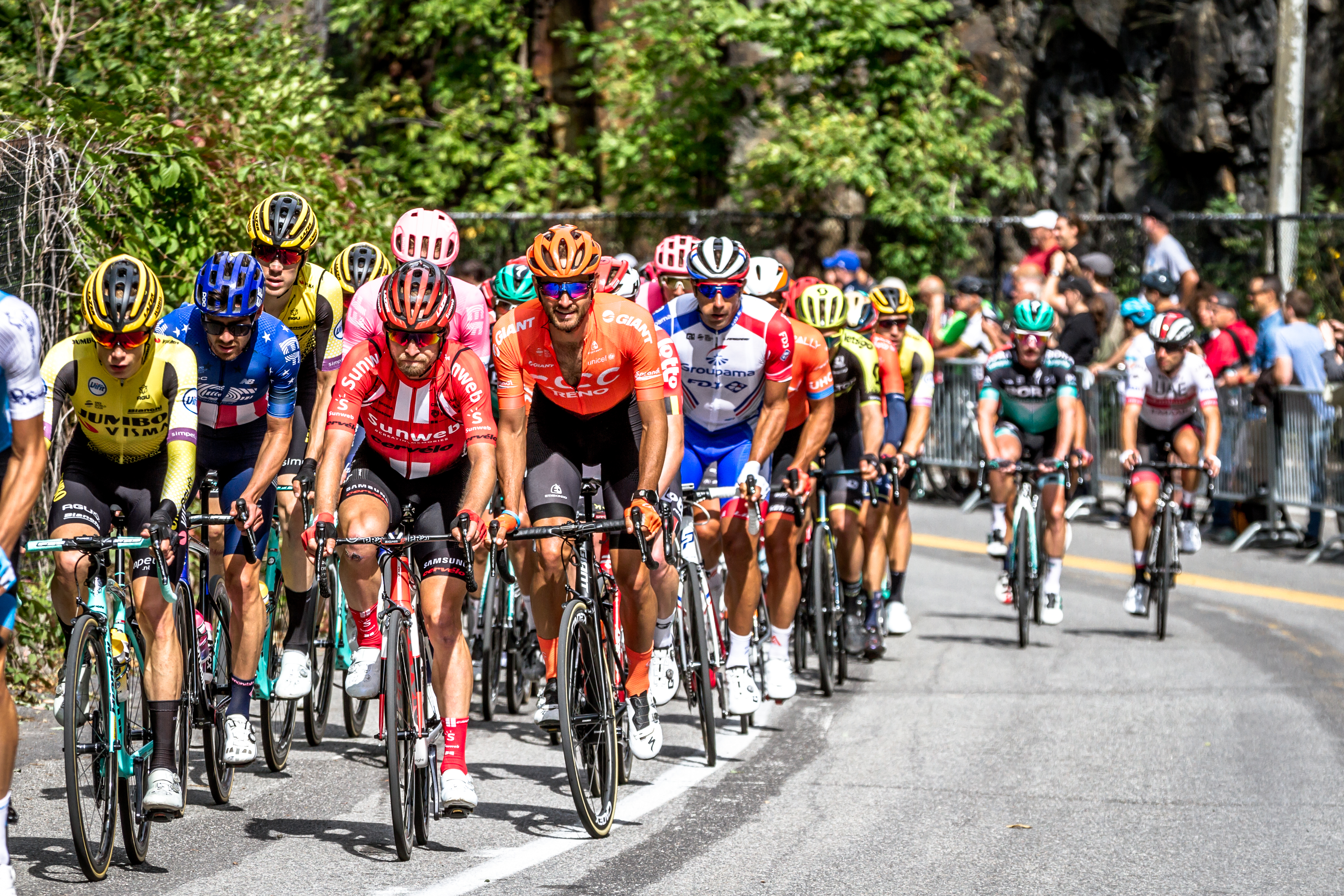
- Peloton on the Camillien Houde climb

Race details
- Dates: 15 September 2019
- Stages: 1
- Distance: 219.6 km (136.5 mi)
- Winning time: 6h 09' 38"

Results
	Winner	Greg Van Avermaet (BEL)	(CCC Team)
	Second	Diego Ulissi (ITA)	(UAE Team Emirates)
	Third	Iván García (ESP)	(Bahrain–Merida)

The 2019 Grand Prix Cycliste de Montréal was a road cycling one-day race that took place on 15 September 2019 in Canada. It was the 10th edition of Grand Prix Cycliste de Montréal and the 36th event of the 2019 UCI World Tour. 2016 winner Greg van Avermaet won the race for the second time in a reduced bunch sprint.

== Teams ==
Twenty-one teams, which consisted of all eighteen UCI WorldTour teams, two UCI Professional Continental teams, and one national team, participated in the race. Each team entered seven riders except for Lotto–Soudal, who entered six, meaning that 146 riders started the race. Of these riders, only 97 finished.

UCI WorldTeams

- AG2R La Mondiale
- Astana
- Bahrain–Merida
- Bora–Hansgrohe
- CCC Team
- Deceuninck–Quick-Step
- EF Education First
- Groupama–FDJ
- Lotto–Soudal
- Mitchelton–Scott
- Movistar Team
- Team Dimension Data
- Team Ineos
- Team Jumbo–Visma
- Team Katusha–Alpecin
- Team Sunweb
- Trek–Segafredo
- UAE Team Emirates

UCI Professional Continental teams

- Israel Cycling Academy
- Rally UHC Cycling

National teams

- Canada

== Results ==
Result
Rank	Rider	Team	Time
1	Greg van Avermaet (BEL)	CCC Team	6h 09' 38"
2	Diego Ulissi (ITA)	UAE Team Emirates	+ 0"
3	Iván García (ESP)	Bahrain–Merida	+ 0"
4	Tim Wellens (BEL)	Lotto–Soudal	+ 0"
5	Michael Valgren (DEN)	Team Dimension Data	+ 0"
6	Kristian Sbaragli (ITA)	Israel Cycling Academy	+ 0"
7	Rui Costa (POR)	UAE Team Emirates	+ 0"
8	Michael Woods (CAN)	EF Education First	+ 0"
9	Nans Peters (FRA)	AG2R La Mondiale	+ 0"
10	Bauke Mollema (NED)	Trek–Segafredo	+ 0"
