= Álvaro Hodeg =

Colombian cyclist

Álvaro Hodeg Chagüi
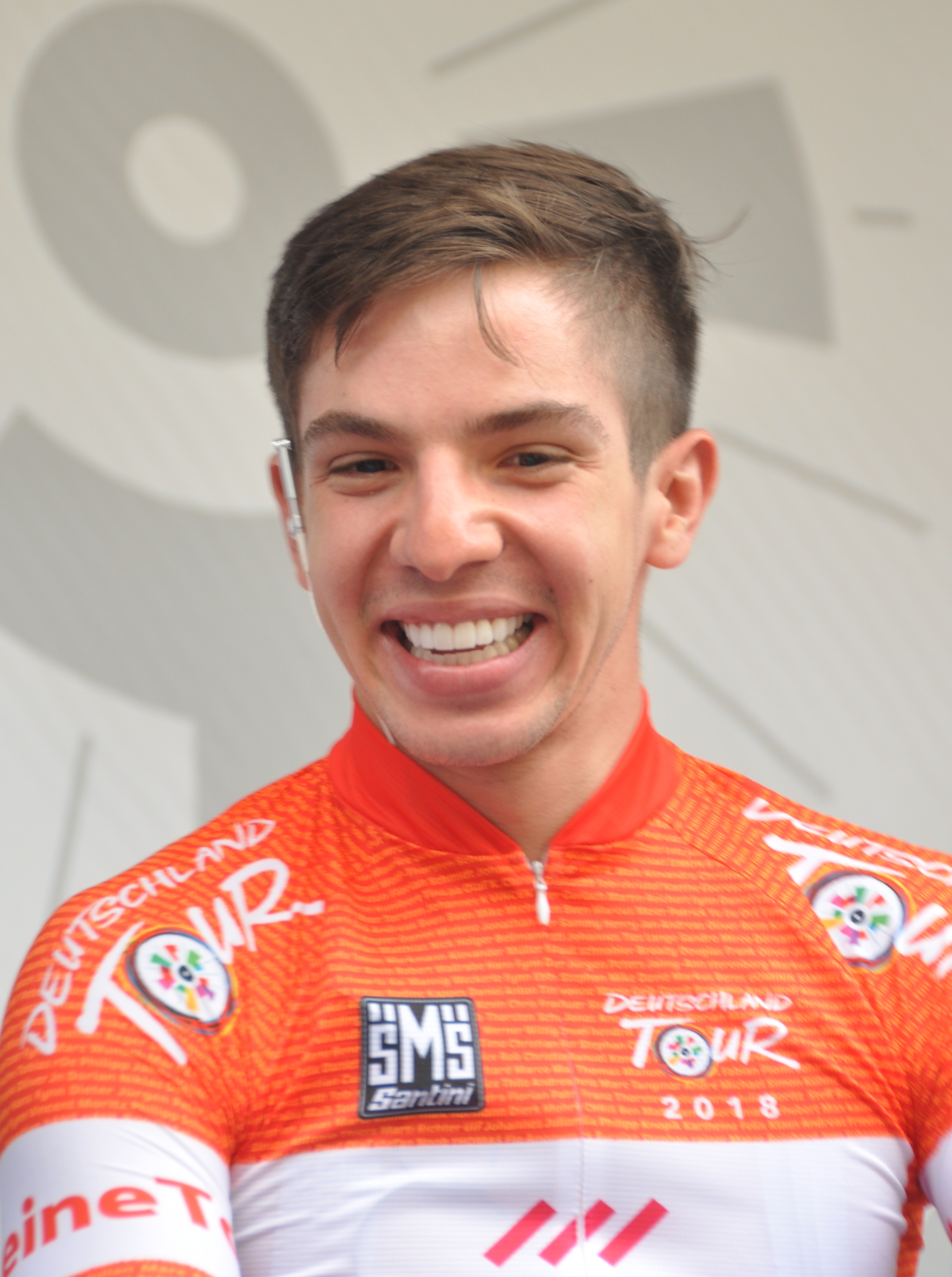
- Hodeg in 2018.

Personal information
- Full name: Álvaro José Hodeg Chagüi
- Born: 16 September 1996 (age 30) Montería, Colombia
- Height: 1.86 m (6 ft 1 in)
- Weight: 76 kg (168 lb)

Cycling career
- Sport: Cycling
- Current team: Team Medellín–EPM
- Discipline: Road
- Role: Rider
- Rider type: Sprinter

Amateur teams
- 2014–2016: Coldeportes–Claro
- 2017: Home Solution–Anmapa–Soenens Cycling Team

Professional teams
- 2017: Coldeportes–Zenú
- 2017: Quick-Step Floors (stagiaire)
- 2018–2021: Quick-Step Floors
- 2022-2024: UAE Team Emirates
- 2025: Team Medellín–EPM

Major wins
- One-day races and Classics Handzame Classic (2018) Münsterland Giro (2019)
Medal record
Representing Colombia
Men's road cycling
Pan American Championships
Gold medal – first place	2025 Punta del Este	Road race

Álvaro José Hodeg Chagüi (born 16 September 1996 in Montería) is a Colombian cyclist of Scottish and Lebanese descent, who currently rides for UCI Continental team Team Medellín–EPM. A sprinter, Hodeg has notably won the 2018 Handzame Classic and 2019 Münsterland Giro one-day races. He has also won stages at four UCI WorldTour races: the Volta a Catalunya, Tour de Pologne, Tour of Turkey, all in 2018, and the 2019 BinckBank Tour. His most recent UCI WorldTour victory was stage one of the 2021 Okolo Slovenska. He also competed in the 2020 Giro d'Italia, finishing third on stage 11.

== Major results ==
2017
1st Intermediate sprints classification, Girobio
1st Stage 6 Tour de l'Avenir
2nd Grote Prijs Stad Sint-Niklaas
2018 (5 pro wins)
1st Handzame Classic
1st Stage 1 Volta a Catalunya
1st Stage 1 Deutschland Tour
1st Stage 3 Tour de Pologne
1st Stage 5 Tour of Turkey
1st Stage 1 (TTT) Adriatica Ionica Race
3rd Grand Prix de Fourmies
4th Elfstedenronde
2019 (7)
1st Münsterland Giro
1st Heistse Pijl
Adriatica Ionica Race

1st Points classification
1st Stages 1 & 4

1st Stage 2 Tour Colombia
1st Stage 2 Tour of Norway
1st Stage 5 BinckBank Tour
3rd Bredene Koksijde Classic
2021 (3)
1st Grote Prijs Marcel Kint
1st Stage 1 Tour de l'Ain
1st Stage 1 Okolo Slovenska
7th Grand Prix de Fourmies
8th Münsterland Giro
2023
8th Grand Prix de Fourmies
2025 (1)
1st Road race, Pan American Road Championships
1st Stage 5 Tour de Panamá

=== Grand Tour general classification results timeline ===
Grand Tour	2020
Giro d'Italia	131
Tour de France	—
Vuelta a España	—

Legend
—	Did not compete
DNF	Did not finish
