= Eirik Lunder =

Norwegian bicycle racer

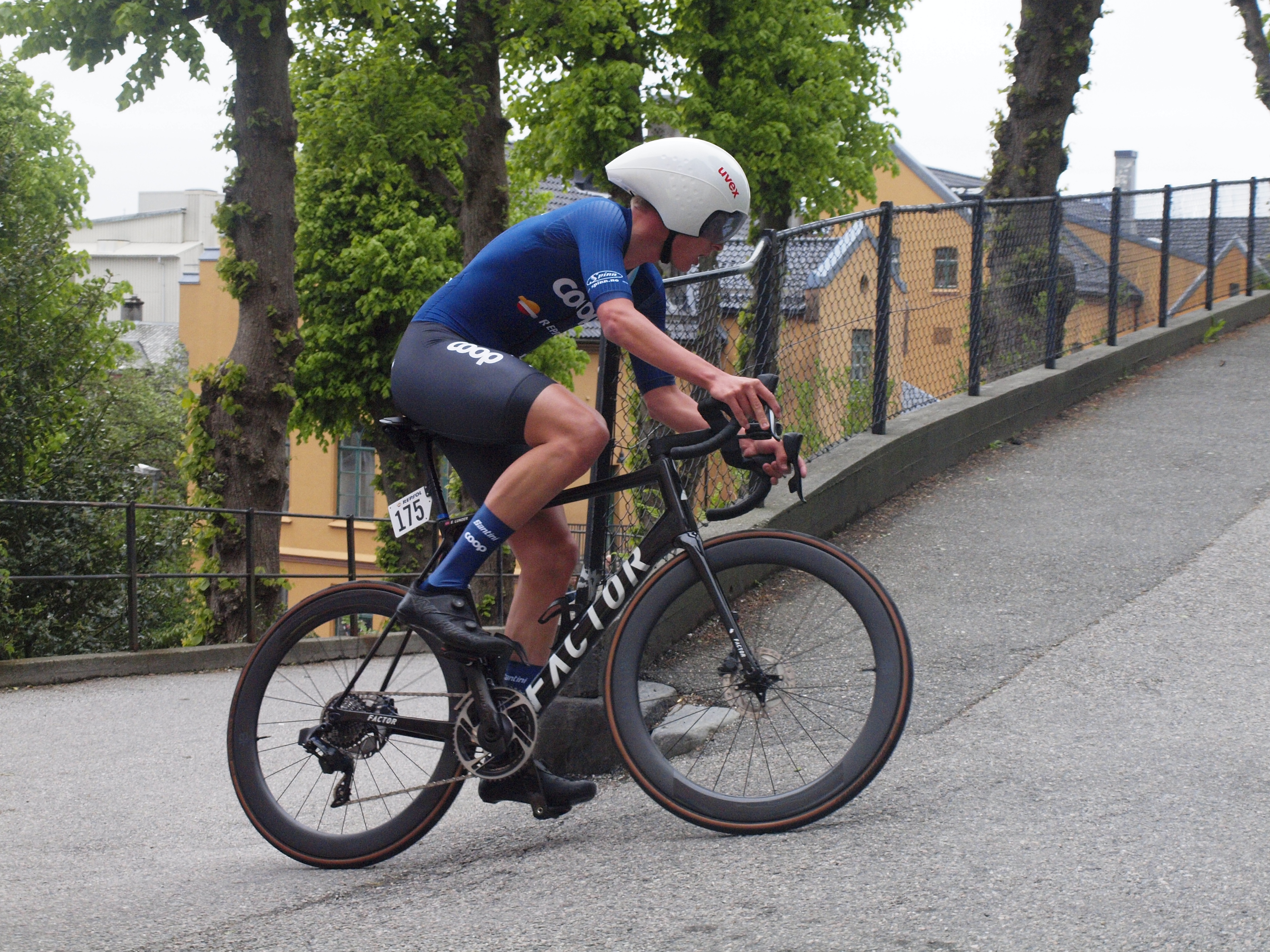
- Lunder at the 2023 Tour of Norway.

Personal information
- Born: 9 June 1999 (age 27) Stavanger, Norway
- Height: 1.94 m (6 ft 4 in)
- Weight: 78 kg (172 lb)

Cycling career
- Sport: Cycling
- Current team: Retired
- Discipline: Road
- Role: Rider

Amateur team
- 2015–2019: Stavanger Sykleklubb

Professional teams
- 2019–2021: Team Coop
- 2021: Gazprom–RusVelo (stagiaire)
- 2022: Gazprom–RusVelo
- 2022–2023: Team Coop

Eirik Lunder (born 9 June 1999) is a Norwegian former cyclist, who competed as a professional from 2019 to 2023.

== Major results ==
2021
1st Overall Dookoła Mazowsza

1st Young rider classification
1st Stage 1

2023
1st International Rhodes Grand Prix
