= Yonatan Haile =

Eritrean cyclist

Personal information
- Born: 15 September 1994 (age 32) Asmara, Eritrea

Cycling career
- Sport: Cycling
- Current team: Start Cycling Team
- Discipline: Road
- Role: Rider

Professional team
- 2017–2018: Start–Vaxes Cycling Team

Yonatan Haile (born 15 September 1994) is an Eritrean cyclist riding for Start Cycling Team.

== Major results ==
2015
4th National Road Race Championships
2016
1st Stage 1 Tour of Eritrea
2nd Massawa Circuit
5th Overall Tour du Faso
2017
5th Road race, African Road Championships
8th Massawa Circuit
10th Fenkil Northern Red Sea Challenge
2018
6th National Road Race Championships
