= Kristoffer Halvorsen =

Norwegian road cyclist (born 1996)

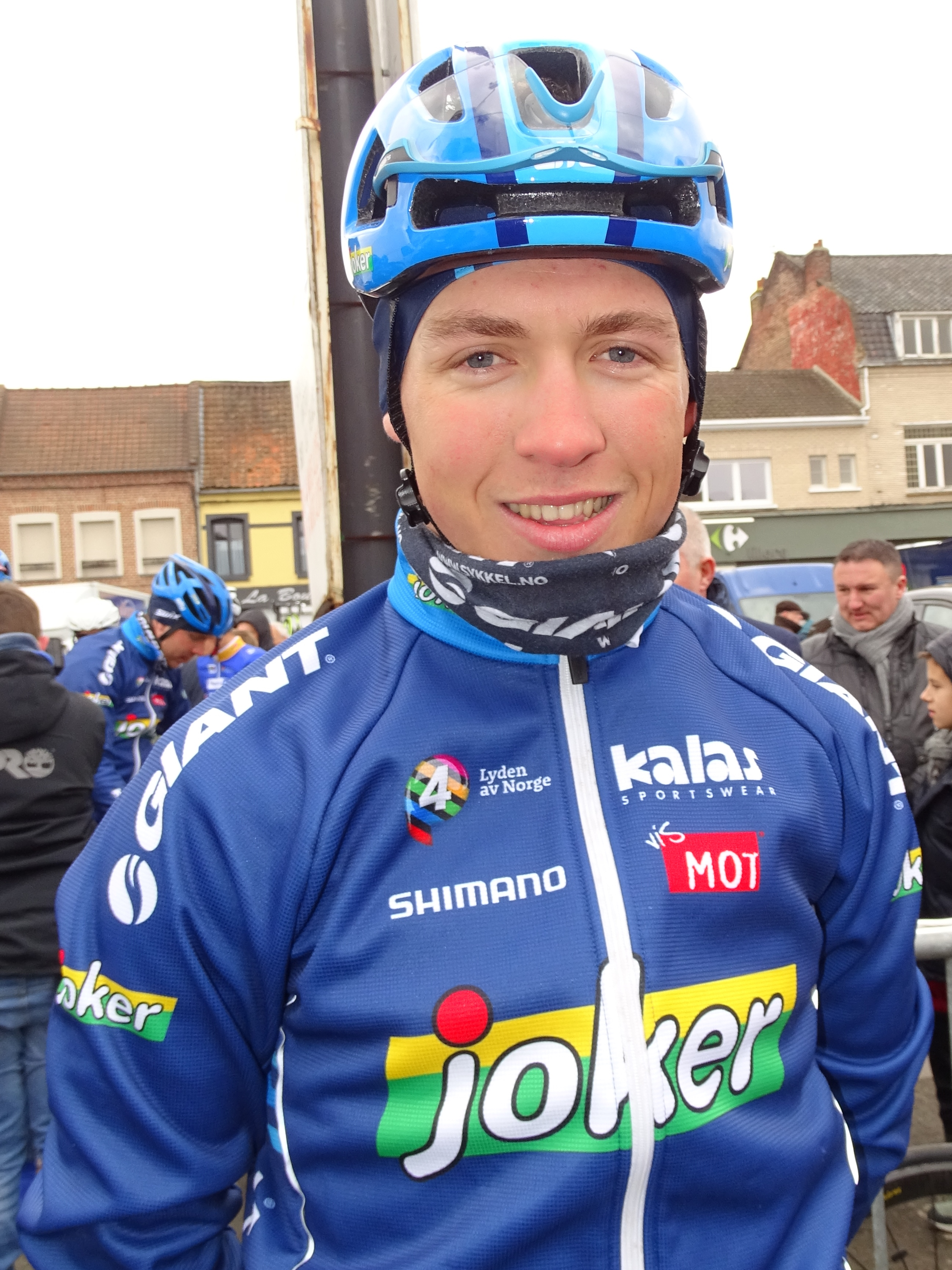
- Halvorsen in 2016.

Personal information
- Full name: Kristoffer Halvorsen
- Nickname: Doffen
- Born: 13 April 1996 (age 30) Kristiansand, Norway
- Height: 1.79 m (5 ft 10 in)
- Weight: 69 kg (152 lb)

Cycling career
- Sport: Cycling
- Current team: Retired
- Discipline: Road
- Role: Rider
- Rider type: Sprinter

Professional teams
- 2015: Team Joker (stagiaire)
- 2016–2017: Team Joker
- 2018–2019: Team Sky
- 2020: EF Pro Cycling
- 2021–2023: Uno-X Pro Cycling Team
Medal record
Representing Norway
Men's road bicycle racing
World Championships
Gold medal – first place	2016 Doha	Under-23 road race

Kristoffer Halvorsen (born 13 April 1996) is a Norwegian former racing cyclist, who competed as a professional from 2016 to 2023.

== Career ==
On 13 October 2016, Halvorsen won the Men's under-23 road race in the 2016 UCI Road World Championships.

=== 2018 ===
Halvorsen signed for Team Sky after two seasons with the Norwegian continental team Joker Icopal. Halvorsen was due to make his Team Sky debut, in the Tour Down Under, leading his new team in the sprints. However, on 14 January, Halvorsen crashed at the People's Choice Classic, fracturing his hand and thereby ruling him out of the Tour Down Under. On 16 March, he came in second at the Handzame Classic.

== Major results ==
2013
1st Stage 1 Trofeo Karlsberg
1st Stage 3 Tour of Istria
10th Overall Trophée Centre Morbihan
2016
1st Road race, UCI Under-23 Road World Championships
1st Grand Prix d'Isbergues
Olympia's Tour

1st Stages 3b & 4

1st Stage 3 Tour de l'Avenir
2nd Nokere Koerse
2nd Road race, National Under-23 Road Championships
3rd Road race, National Road Championships
4th Overall ZLM Tour

1st Stage 1 (TTT)

9th Kattekoers
2017
1st Handzame Classic
Tour de l'Avenir

1st Points classification
1st Stage 3

5th Road race, UEC European Under-23 Road Championships
5th Omloop Eurometropool
2018
2nd Handzame Classic
2019
1st Stage 5 Herald Sun Tour
2nd Overall Tour of Norway

1st Young rider classification
1st Stage 6

2nd Bredene Koksijde Classic
6th Three Days of Bruges–De Panne
2021
1st Stage 3 Okolo Slovenska
3rd Overall Boucles de la Mayenne
8th Nokere Koerse
10th Dwars door het Hageland
2023
3rd Grand Prix Criquielion
9th Bredene Koksijde Classic
